= 1995–96 Crystal Palace F.C. season =

English football club season

Crystal Palace
1995–96 season
- Chairman: Ron Noades
- Manager: Steve Coppell (until February); Dave Bassett (from February)
- Stadium: Selhurst Park
- First Division: 3rd
- FA Cup: Third round
- League Cup: Third round
- Top goalscorer: Dougie Freedman (20)
- Highest home attendance: 19,354 (vs. Norwich City, 5 May 1996)
- Lowest home attendance: 11,548 vs. Grimsby Town, 5 March 1996)
- Average home league attendance: 15,248
Home colours

During the 1995–96 English football season, Crystal Palace F.C. competed in the Football League First Division.

== Season summary ==
Alan Smith was sacked within days of relegation from the Premiership, and Steve Coppell returned to the manager's seat. Relegation also resulted in an exodus of players. The likes of Chris Coleman, Eric Young, Richard Shaw, Gareth Southgate, Iain Dowie, John Salako and Chris Armstrong were all sold to other clubs and Palace's line-up in the first game of the 1995–96 Division One campaign was barely recognisable. The campaign went poorly, and Coppell's second spell was brought to an end after only seven months, with relegation looking increasingly possible. Dave Bassett then joined the club for a second spell, which proved to be far more productive than his first as the club embarked on a stunning run of form which took them to the play-offs. The Eagles beat Charlton Athletic in the semi-finals to take them to the final against Leicester City at Wembley Stadium, in which they narrowly lost to the Foxes by a long range Steve Claridge goal in the final minute of extra time.

== Final league table ==
Pos	Team	Pld	W	D	L	GF	GA	GD	Pts	Qualification or relegation
1	Sunderland (C, P)	46	22	17	7	59	33	+26	83	Promotion to the Premier League
2	Derby County (P)	46	21	16	9	71	51	+20	79	Promotion to the Premier League
3	Crystal Palace	46	20	15	11	67	48	+19	75	Qualification for the First Division play-offs
4	Stoke City	46	20	13	13	60	49	+11	73	Qualification for the First Division play-offs
5	Leicester City (O, P)	46	19	14	13	66	60	+6	71	Qualification for the First Division play-offs

Rules for classification: 1) Points; 2) Goals scored; 3) Goal difference
(C) Champions; (O) Play-off winners; (P) Promoted

== Results ==
Crystal Palace's score comes first

=== Legend ===
Win	Draw	Loss

=== Football League First Division ===
Date	Opponent	Venue	Result	Attendance	Scorers
12 August 1995	Barnsley	H	4–3	12,067	Houghton, Dowie (2), Gordon (pen)
19 August 1995	Ipswich Town	A	0–1	12,681	
26 August 1995	Charlton Athletic	H	1–1	14,124	Dyer
29 August 1995	Sheffield United	A	3–2	15,170	Dyer (2), Gordon
9 September 1995	Birmingham City	A	0–0	19,403	
12 September 1995	Watford	A	0–0	8,780	
16 September 1995	Huddersfield Town	H	0–0	15,645	
23 September 1995	Oldham Athletic	A	1–3	14,434	Hopkin
30 September 1995	Stoke City	H	1–1	14,613	Freedman
7 October 1995	Sunderland	H	0–1	13,754	
15 October 1995	Port Vale	A	2–1	6,935	Freedman, Gordon
22 October 1995	Millwall	H	1–2	14,338	Gordon
28 October 1995	Leicester City	A	3–2	18,376	Dyer (2), Hopkin
4 November 1995	Reading	H	0–2	16,058	
11 November 1995	Norwich City	A	0–1	14,156	
19 November 1995	Southend United	A	1–1	5,089	Lapper (own goal)
22 November 1995	Wolverhampton Wanderers	H	3–2	12,571	Freedman (3)
25 November 1995	Derby County	H	0–0	13,506	
3 December 1995	Sunderland	A	0–1	12,777	
9 December 1995	Oldham Athletic	H	2–2	12,709	Davies, Freedman
16 December 1995	Stoke City	A	2–1	12,090	Freedman, Taylor
23 December 1995	West Bromwich Albion	A	3–2	7,694	Gordon (3, 2 pens)
1 January 1996	Portsmouth	A	3–2	12,296	Hopkin (2), Freedman
13 January 1996	Ipswich Town	H	1–1	14,097	Davies
20 January 1996	Barnsley	A	1–1	6,620	Gordon
4 February 1996	Charlton Athletic	A	0–0	13,560	
10 February 1996	Sheffield United	H	0–0	15,883	
17 February 1996	Watford	H	4–0	13,325	Freedman (2), Dyer (2)
20 February 1996	Tranmere Rovers	A	3–2	5,253	Freedman, Boere, Houghton
24 February 1996	Huddersfield Town	A	0–3	13,041	
27 February 1996	Birmingham City	H	3–2	12,965	Dyer (3)
2 March 1996	Luton Town	A	0–0	9,478	
5 March 1996	Grimsby Town	H	5–0	11,548	Freedman (3), Hopkin, Houghton
9 March 1996	West Bromwich Albion	H	1–0	18,336	Freedman
12 March 1996	Tranmere Rovers	H	2–1	13,183	Ndah, Hopkin
16 March 1996	Grimsby Town	A	2–0	5,059	Ndah, Gordon
19 March 1996	Luton Town	H	2–0	13,609	Dyer (2)
23 March 1996	Portsmouth	H	0–0	17,039	
30 March 1996	Millwall	A	4–1	13,214	Hopkin, Brown, Ndah (2)
2 April 1996	Port Vale	H	2–2	14,180	Freedman (2)
6 April 1996	Leicester City	H	0–1	17,331	
8 April 1996	Reading	A	2–0	12,579	Freedman, Houghton
14 April 1996	Southend United	H	2–0	15,672	Freedman (2)
20 April 1996	Wolverhampton Wanderers	A	2–0	24,350	Hopkin, Dyer
28 April 1996	Derby County	A	1–2	17,041	Brown
5 May 1996	Norwich City	H	0–1	19,354	

=== First Division play-offs ===
Round	Date	Opponent	Venue	Result	Attendance	Goalscorers
SF 1st Leg	12 May 1996	Charlton Athletic	A	2–1	14,618	Brown, Veart
SF 2nd Leg	15 May 1996	Charlton Athletic	H	1–0	22,880	Houghton
F	27 May 1996	Leicester City	N	1–2	73,573	Roberts

=== FA Cup ===
Round	Date	Opponent	Venue	Result	Attendance	Goalscorers
R3	6 January 1996	Port Vale	H	0–0	10,456	
R3R	16 January 1996	Port Vale	A	3–4	6,754	Taylor, Cox, Dyer

=== League Cup ===
Round	Date	Opponent	Venue	Result	Attendance	Goalscorers
R2 First Leg	19 September 1995	Southend United	A	2–2	4,031	Hopkin (2)
R2 Second Leg	3 October 1995	Southend United	H	2–0	6,588	Vincent, McKenzie
R3	25 October 1995	Middlesbrough	H	2–2	11,873	Hopkin (2)
R3R	8 November 1995	Middlesbrough	A	0–2	16,150	

== Players ==
=== First-team squad ===
Note: Flags indicate national team as defined under FIFA eligibility rules; some limited exceptions apply. Players may hold more than one non-FIFA nationality.

No.	Pos.	Nation	Player
—	GK	(England) ENG	Nigel Martyn
—	GK	(Wales) WAL	Rhys Wilmot
—	DF	(England) ENG	Danny Boxall (Note: Boxall was born in Croydon, England, but also qualified to represent the Republic of Ireland internationally and would later represent them at U-21 level.)
—	DF	(England) ENG	Kenny Brown (on loan from West Ham United)
—	DF	(England) ENG	Sagi Burton (Note: Burton was born in Birmingham, England, but also qualified to represent Saint Kitts and Nevis internationally and would make his international debut for Saint Kitts and Nevis in June 2004.)
—	DF	(England) ENG	Ian Cox (Note: Cox was born in Croydon, England, but also qualified to represent Trinidad and Tobago internationally and would make his international debut for Trinidad and Tobago in 2000.)
—	DF	(England) ENG	Jason Cundy (on loan from Tottenham Hotspur)
—	DF	(England) ENG	Andy Cyrus
—	DF	(England) ENG	Marc Edworthy
—	DF	(England) ENG	Tony Gale
—	DF	(England) ENG	Dean Gordon
—	DF	(England) ENG	Paul Sparrow
—	DF	(England) ENG	Dave Tuttle
—	DF	(England) ENG	Jamie Vincent
—	DF	(Wales) WAL	Gareth Davies (Note: Davies was born in Hereford, England, but was raised in Wales and has represented them at U-21 level.)
—	MF	(England) ENG	Tony Folan (Note: Folan was born in Croydon, England, but was raised in the Republic of Ireland and represented them at U-19 and U-21 level.)
—	MF	(England) ENG	Damian Matthew
—	MF	(England) ENG	Darren Pitcher

No.	Pos.	Nation	Player
—	MF	(England) ENG	Rob Quinn (Note: Quinn was born in Bexley, England, but also qualified to represent the Republic of Ireland internationally and would represent them at U-21 and B level.)
—	MF	(England) ENG	Andy Roberts
—	MF	(England) ENG	Simon Rodger
—	MF	(Scotland) SCO	David Hopkin
—	MF	(Scotland) SCO	Steven Thomson
—	MF	(Republic of Ireland) IRL	Rory Ginty
—	MF	(Republic of Ireland) IRL	Ray Houghton (Note: Houghton was born in Glasgow, Scotland, but also qualified to represent the Republic of Ireland internationally through his father and made his international debut for the Republic of Ireland in March 1986.)
—	MF	(Republic of Ireland) IRL	Brian Launders
—	MF	(Republic of Ireland) IRL	Tony Scully
—	MF	(Australia) AUS	Carl Veart
—	FW	(England) ENG	Bruce Dyer (Note: Dyer was born in Redbridge, England, and represented them at U-21 level, but played a friendly game for Montserrat against Ashford Town in September 2007.)
—	FW	(England) ENG	Jason Harris
—	FW	(England) ENG	Leon McKenzie
—	FW	(England) ENG	George Ndah (Note: Ndah was born in Southwark, England, but also qualified to represent Nigeria internationally and was called up by Nigeria in 1999, but was prevented from playing due to injury.)
—	FW	(Wales) WAL	Gareth Taylor (Note: Taylor was born in Weston-super-Mare, England, but also qualified to represent Wales internationally through his father and made his international debut for Wales in 1995.)
—	FW	(Scotland) SCO	Dougie Freedman
—	FW	(Northern Ireland) NIR	Iain Dowie (Note: Dowie was born in Hatfield, England, but also qualified to represent Northern Ireland internationally through his father and made his international debut for Northern Ireland in 1990.)
—	FW	(Netherlands) NED	Jeroen Boere
