= 1997–98 Crystal Palace F.C. season =

English football club season

Crystal Palace
1997–98 season
- Chairman: Ron Noades
- Manager: Steve Coppell (until 13 March); Attilio Lombardo (from 13 March to 29 April); Ray Lewington (from 29 April)
- Stadium: Selhurst Park
- FA Premier League: 20th (relegated)
- FA Cup: Fifth round
- League Cup: Second round
- Top goalscorer: League: Neil Shipperley (7); All: Bruce Dyer (8)
- Highest home attendance: 26,186 (vs. Chelsea, 13 September)
- Lowest home attendance: 14,410 (vs. Wimbledon, 9 February)
- Average home league attendance: 21,983
Home colours	Away colours	Third colours

During the 1997–98 English football season, Crystal Palace competed in the FA Premier League.

== Season summary ==
Experienced Italian midfielder Attilio Lombardo joined Crystal Palace early in the season, and the team stood 10th in the table by November. Within the first 14 games of the season, Palace recorded five wins, five losses, and four draws, with all of their victories occurring away from home. Following a 1–0 win at Tottenham Hotspur, the team's form declined. Although the club also signed Italian forward Michele Padovano and Swedish forward Tomas Brolin, both players struggled to make an impact, and Palace subsequently fell into relegation trouble.

With a takeover by computer tycoon Mark Goldberg on the horizon, Steve Coppell relinquished his managerial duties to become Director of Football. Lombardo and Brolin became joint player-managers on a short-term contract, but were unable to stave off relegation, which was confirmed on 27 April after a 3–0 defeat to Manchester United and they were soon on their way out of the club and Ray Lewington was appointed for the final three league games of the season. It was a season to forget for the club which saw them win just two home league games all season and it took them eight months to record their first home league win: against Derby County in April.

When the Goldberg takeover was completed, Terry Venables returned to the manager's seat after 18 years away, with the new chairman stating that Palace would be a European force by 2003.

== Kit ==
Palace retained the previous season's home kit, manufactured by German company Adidas and sponsored by TDK.

== Final league table ==
Pos	Team	Pld	W	D	L	GF	GA	GD	Pts	Qualification or relegation
16	Sheffield Wednesday	38	12	8	18	52	67	−15	44	
17	Everton	38	9	13	16	41	56	−15	40	
18	Bolton Wanderers (R)	38	9	13	16	41	61	−20	40	Relegation to the Football League First Division
19	Barnsley (R)	38	10	5	23	37	82	−45	35	Relegation to the Football League First Division
20	Crystal Palace (Note: Crystal Palace qualified for the 1998 Intertoto Cup as they were the only English team who applied.) (R)	38	8	9	21	37	71	−34	33	Intertoto Cup third round and relegation to the First Division

Source: Premier League
Rules for classification: 1) points; 2) goal difference; 3) number of goals scored.
(R) Relegated
Notes:

Results summary

Overall								Home						Away					
Pld	W	D	L	GF	GA	GD	Pts	W	D	L	GF	GA	GD	W	D	L	GF	GA	GD
38	8	9	21	37	71	−34	33	2	5	12	15	39	−24	6	4	9	22	32	−10

Source: 1997-98 FA Premier League table

Results by round

Round	1	2	3	4	5	6	7	8	9	10	11	12	13	14	15	16	17	18	19	20	21	22	23	24	25	26	27	28	29	30	31	32	33	34	35	36	37	38
Ground	A	H	A	A	H	H	A	A	H	A	H	A	H	A	H	A	A	H	A	H	A	H	A	H	H	A	H	A	A	A	H	H	A	H	H	A	H	H
Result	W	L	W	L	L	L	W	D	D	L	D	W	D	W	L	L	D	L	D	D	D	L	L	L	L	L	L	L	L	W	L	L	L	W	L	L	D	W
Position	2	9	5	8	9	13	10	9	11	13	14	12	12	10	10	12	12	15	13	13	14	17	17	17	18	19	20	20	20	20	20	20	20	20	20	20	20	20

Source: 11v11.com: 1997-98 Crystal Palace results
A = Away; H = Home; W = Win; D = Draw; L = Loss

== Results ==
Crystal Palace's score comes first

=== Legend ===
Win	Draw	Loss

=== FA Premier League ===
Date	Opponent	Venue	Result	Attendance	Scorers
9 August 1997	Everton	A	2–1	35,716	Lombardo, Dyer (pen)
12 August 1997	Barnsley	H	0–1	21,547	
23 August 1997	Leeds United	A	2–0	29,076	Warhurst, Lombardo
27 August 1997	Southampton	A	0–1	15,032	
30 August 1997	Blackburn Rovers	H	1–2	20,849	Dyer
13 September 1997	Chelsea	H	0–3	26,186	
20 September 1997	Wimbledon	A	1–0	16,747	Lombardo
24 September 1997	Coventry City	A	1–1	15,900	Fullarton
27 September 1997	Bolton Wanderers	H	2–2	17,134	Warhurst, Gordon
4 October 1997	Manchester United	A	0–2	55,143	
18 October 1997	Arsenal	H	0–0	26,180	
25 October 1997	Sheffield Wednesday	A	3–1	22,072	Hreidarsson, Rodger, Shipperley
8 November 1997	Aston Villa	H	1–1	21,097	Shipperley
24 November 1997	Tottenham Hotspur	A	1–0	25,634	Shipperley
29 November 1997	Newcastle United	H	1–2	26,085	Shipperley
3 December 1997	West Ham United	A	1–4	23,335	Shipperley
6 December 1997	Leicester City	A	1–1	19,191	Padovano
13 December 1997	Liverpool	H	0–3	25,790	
20 December 1997	Derby County	A	0–0	26,590	
26 December 1997	Southampton	H	1–1	22,853	Shipperley
28 December 1997	Blackburn Rovers	A	2–2	23,872	Dyer, Warhurst
10 January 1998	Everton	H	1–3	23,311	Dyer (pen)
17 January 1998	Barnsley	A	0–1	17,819	
31 January 1998	Leeds United	H	0–2	25,248	
9 February 1998	Wimbledon	H	0–3	14,410	
21 February 1998	Arsenal	A	0–1	38,094	
28 February 1998	Coventry City	H	0–3	21,810	
11 March 1998	Chelsea	A	2–6	31,917	Hreidarsson, Bent
14 March 1998	Aston Villa	A	1–3	33,781	Jansen
18 March 1998	Newcastle United	A	2–1	36,565	Lombardo, Jansen
28 March 1998	Tottenham Hotspur	H	1–3	26,116	Shipperley
11 April 1998	Leicester City	H	0–3	18,771	
13 April 1998	Liverpool	A	1–2	43,007	Bent
18 April 1998	Derby County	H	3–1	18,101	Jansen, Ćurčić, Bent
27 April 1998	Manchester United	H	0–3	26,180	
2 May 1998	Bolton Wanderers	A	2–5	24,449	Gordon, Bent
5 May 1998	West Ham United	H	3–3	19,129	Bent, Rodger, Lombardo
10 May 1998	Sheffield Wednesday	H	1–0	16,876	Morrison

=== FA Cup ===
Round	Date	Opponent	Venue	Result	Attendance	Goalscorers
R3	3 January 1998	Scunthorpe United	H	2–0	11,624	Emblen (2)
R4	24 January 1998	Leicester City	H	3–0	15,489	Dyer (3)
R5	15 February 1998	Arsenal	A	0–0	37,164	
R5R	25 February 1998	Arsenal	H	1–2	15,674	Dyer

=== League Cup ===
Round	Date	Opponent	Venue	Result	Attendance	Goalscorers
R2 1st Leg	16 September 1997	Hull City	A	0–1	9,323	
R2 2nd Leg	30 September 1997	Hull City	H	2–1 (lost on away goals)	6,407	Veart, Ndah

== First-team squad ==
Squad at end of season

Note: Flags indicate national team as defined under FIFA eligibility rules; some limited exceptions apply. Players may hold more than one non-FIFA nationality.

No.	Pos.	Nation	Player
1	GK	ENG	Kevin Miller
2	DF	ENG	Marc Edworthy
3	DF	ENG	Dean Gordon
4	MF	YUG	Saša Ćurčić
5	DF	ENG	Dave Tuttle
6	DF	ENG	Andy Linighan (captain)
7	MF	ITA	Attilio Lombardo
8	DF	ENG	Paul Warhurst
9	FW	ENG	Neil Shipperley
10	FW	ENG	Bruce Dyer (Note: Dyer was born in Redbridge, England, and represented them at U-21 level, but played a friendly game for Montserrat against Ashford Town in September 2007.)
11	FW	ITA	Michele Padovano
12	FW	SWE	Tomas Brolin
13	GK	ENG	Carlo Nash
14	MF	ENG	Simon Rodger

No.	Pos.	Nation	Player
15	FW	ENG	Marcus Bent
16	MF	IRL	Rob Quinn (Note: Quinn was born in London, England, but also qualified to represent the Republic of Ireland internationally and has represented them at U-21 and B level.)
17	DF	ENG	Jamie Smith
18	DF	FRA	Valérien Ismaël
20	FW	ENG	Leon McKenzie
21	DF	ENG	Sagi Burton (Note: Burton was born in Birmingham, England, but also qualified to represent Saint Kitts and Nevis internationally and would make his international debut for Saint Kitts and Nevis in June 2004.)
22	DF	ISL	Hermann Hreiðarsson
26	MF	SCO	Jamie Fullarton
27	FW	ENG	Matt Jansen
32	DF	IRL	Danny Boxall (Note: Boxall was born in Croydon, England, but also qualified to represent the Republic of Ireland internationally and has represented them at U-21 level.)
34	MF	IRL	Rory Ginty
35	FW	ENG	Clinton Morrison (Note: Morrison was born in Wandsworth, England, but also qualified to represent the Republic of Ireland internationally through his grandmother and would make his international debut for the Republic of Ireland in August 2001.)
40	MF	IRL	Tony Folan (Note: Folan was born in Lewisham, England, but also qualified to represent the Republic of Ireland internationally and has represented them at U-17, U-19 and U-21 level.)

=== Left club during season ===
Note: Flags indicate national team as defined under FIFA eligibility rules; some limited exceptions apply. Players may hold more than one non-FIFA nationality.

No.	Pos.	Nation	Player
4	MF	ENG	Andy Roberts (to Wimbledon)
11	FW	SCO	Dougie Freedman (to Wolves)
12	FW	AUS	Carl Veart (to Millwall)
15	DF	WAL	Gareth Davies (Note: Davies was born in Hereford, England, but was raised in Wales and has represented them at U-21 level.) (to Reading)
17	DF	AUS	Kevin Muscat (Note: Muscat was born in Crawley, England, but also qualified to represent Australia internationally and represented them at U-20 and U-23 level before making his international debut for Australia in September 1994.) (to Wolves)
18	FW	ENG	George Ndah (Note: Ndah was born in Southwark, England, but also qualified to represent Nigeria internationally and was called up by Nigeria in 1999, but was prevented from playing due to injury.) (to Swindon Town)
24	MF	ENG	Neil Emblen (to Wolves)

No.	Pos.	Nation	Player
27	MF	ISR	Itzik Zohar (to Maccabi Haifa)
33	DF	ENG	Dean Wordsworth (to Stevenage Borough)
33	MF	ITA	Ivano Bonetti (to Genoa)
33	MF	ITA	Patrizio Billio (on loan from AC Milan)
34	MF	IRL	Tony Scully (to Manchester City)
—	FW	ENG	Jason Harris (to Leyton Orient)

== Transfers ==
=== In ===
Date	Pos	Name	From	Fee
12 June 1997	GK	Kevin Miller	Watford	£1,550,000
1 August 1997	MF	Attilio Lombardo	Juventus	£1,600,000
1 August 1997	GK	Gareth Ormshaw	Ramblers	Free transfer
1 August 1997	DF	Paul Warhurst	Blackburn Rovers	Signed
1 August 1997	DF	Hermann Hreiðarsson	ÍBV	Unknown
1 August 1997	MF	Jamie Fullarton	SC Bastia	Free transfer
12 August 1997	MF	Neil Emblen	Wolverhampton Wanderers	£2,000,000
19 August 1997	MF	Itzik Zohar	Beitar Jerusalem	£1,200,000
21 October 1997	DF	Jamie Smith	Wolverhampton Wanderers	£1,000,000
12 November 1997	FW	Michele Padovano	Juventus	£1,700,000
8 January 1998	FW	Marcus Bent	Brentford	£300,000
15 January 1998	DF	Valérien Ismaël	Strasbourg	£2,750,000
10 February 1998	FW	Matt Jansen	Carlisle United	£1,000,000
26 March 1998	MF	Saša Ćurčić	Aston Villa	£1,000,000

=== Out ===
Date	Pos	Name	To	Fee
15 July 1997	MF	Ray Houghton	Reading	Free transfer
21 July 1997	MF	David Hopkin	Leeds United	£3,250,000
1 August 1997	DF	Andy Cyrus	Exeter City	Free transfer
1 August 1997	GK	Chris Day	Watford	Swap
10 August 1997	MF	Tony Scully	Manchester City	£200,000
26 September 1997	FW	Jason Harris	Leyton Orient	£25,000
2 October 1997	DF	Dean Wordsworth	Bromley	Free transfer
21 October 1997	DF	Kevin Muscat	Wolverhampton Wanderers	£200,000
21 October 1997	FW	Dougie Freedman	Wolverhampton Wanderers	£800,000
30 October 1997	MF	Ivano Bonetti	Genoa	Free transfer
21 November 1997	FW	George Ndah	Swindon Town	£500,000
11 December 1997	FW	Carl Veart	Millwall	£100,000
9 March 1998	MF	Andy Roberts	Wimbledon	£2,000,000
26 March 1998	MF	Neil Emblen	Wolverhampton Wanderers	Signed

Transfers in: ▼£14,100,000
Transfers out: ▲£7,075,000
Total spending: ▼£7,025,000

== Statistics ==
=== Appearances and goals ===
No.	Pos	Nat	Player	Total		FA Premier League		FA Cup		League Cup	
No.	Pos	Nat	Player	Apps	Goals	Apps	Goals	Apps	Goals	Apps	Goals
Goalkeepers
1	GK	(England) ENG	Kevin Miller	44	0	38	0	4	0	2	0
Defenders
2	DF	(England) ENG	Marc Edworthy	39	0	33+1	0	4	0	1	0
3	DF	(England) ENG	Dean Gordon	43	2	36+1	2	4	0	2	0
5	DF	(England) ENG	Dave Tuttle	10	0	8+1	0	0	0	1	0
6	DF	(England) ENG	Andy Linighan	31	0	26	0	2+1	0	2	0
8	DF	(England) ENG	Paul Warhurst	24	3	22	3	1	0	1	0
17	DF	(England) ENG	Jamie Smith	22	0	16+2	0	4	0	0	0
18	DF	(France) FRA	Valérien Ismaël	16	0	13	0	3	0	0	0
21	DF	(England) ENG	Sagi Burton	3	0	1+1	0	0+1	0	0	0
22	DF	(Iceland) ISL	Hermann Hreiðarsson	36	2	26+4	2	4	0	2	0
32	DF	(Republic of Ireland) IRL	Danny Boxall	2	0	0+1	0	0	0	1	0
Midfielders
4	MF	(Federal Republic of Yugoslavia) YUG	Saša Ćurčić	8	1	6+2	1	0	0	0	0
7	MF	(Italy) ITA	Attilio Lombardo	24	5	21+3	5	0	0	0	0
12	MF	(Sweden) SWE	Tomas Brolin	16	0	13	0	3	0	0	0
14	MF	(England) ENG	Simon Rodger	33	2	27+2	2	3	0	0+1	0
16	MF	(Republic of Ireland) IRL	Rob Quinn	1	0	0+1	0	0	0	0	0
26	MF	(Scotland) SCO	Jamie Fullarton	30	1	19+6	1	3	0	2	0
34	MF	(Republic of Ireland) IRL	Rory Ginty	6	0	2+3	0	0+1	0	0	0
40	MF	(Republic of Ireland) IRL	Tony Folan	2	0	0+1	0	0	0	0+1	0
Forwards
9	FW	(England) ENG	Neil Shipperley	28	7	17+9	7	0	0	2	0
10	FW	(England) ENG	Bruce Dyer	29	8	21+3	4	4	4	0+1	0
11	FW	(Italy) ITA	Michele Padovano	10	1	8+2	1	0	0	0	0
15	FW	(England) ENG	Marcus Bent	16	5	10+6	5	0	0	0	0
20	FW	(England) ENG	Leon McKenzie	4	0	0+3	0	0+1	0	0	0
27	FW	(England) ENG	Matt Jansen	8	3	5+3	3	0	0	0	0
35	FW	(England) ENG	Clinton Morrison	1	1	0+1	1	0	0	0	0
Players transferred out during the season
4	MF	(England) ENG	Andy Roberts	30	0	25	0	4	0	1	0
11	FW	(Scotland) SCO	Dougie Freedman	9	0	2+5	0	0	0	1+1	0
12	FW	(Australia) AUS	Carl Veart	8	1	1+5	0	0	0	1+1	1
15	DF	(Wales) WAL	Gareth Davies	1	0	0+1	0	0	0	0	0
17	DF	(Australia) AUS	Kevin Muscat	10	0	9	0	0	0	1	0
18	FW	(England) ENG	George Ndah	4	1	2+1	0	0	0	0+1	1
24	MF	(England) ENG	Neil Emblen	15	2	8+5	0	1+1	2	0	0
27	MF	(Israel) ISR	Itzik Zohar	8	0	2+4	0	0	0	2	0
33	MF	(Italy) ITA	Patricio Billio	3	0	1+2	0	0	0	0	0
33	MF	(Italy) ITA	Ivano Bonetti	2	0	0+2	0	0	0	0	0

Last updated: 11 May 1998
Source: Competitions
