= 1996–97 Crystal Palace F.C. season =

English football club season

Crystal Palace
1996–97 season
- Chairman: Ron Noades
- Manager: Dave Bassett (until 27 February); Steve Coppell
- Stadium: Selhurst Park
- First Division: 6th
- Play-offs: Winners
- FA Cup: Third round
- League Cup: Third round
Home colours

During the 1996–97 English football season, Crystal Palace competed in the Football League First Division.

== Season summary ==
Crystal Palace finished 6th place in the First Division and gained promotion to the Premier League after a 1–0 win in the play-off finals over Sheffield United at Wembley, David Hopkin scoring the winner in the 89th minute.

== Final league table ==
Pos	Team	Pld	W	D	L	GF	GA	GD	Pts	Qualification or relegation
4	Ipswich Town	46	20	14	12	68	50	+18	74	Qualification for the First Division play-offs
5	Sheffield United	46	20	13	13	75	52	+23	73	Qualification for the First Division play-offs
6	Crystal Palace (O, P)	46	19	14	13	78	48	+30	71	Qualification for the First Division play-offs
7	Portsmouth	46	20	8	18	59	53	+6	68	
8	Port Vale	46	17	16	13	58	55	+3	67	

Rules for classification: 1) Points; 2) Goals scored; 3) Goal difference
(O) Play-off winners; (P) Promoted

== Results ==
Crystal Palace's score comes first

=== Legend ===
Win	Draw	Loss

=== First Division ===
First Division match results
Date	Opponent	Venue	Result F–A	Scorers	Attendance
18 August 1996	Birmingham City	A	0–1		18,765
24 August 1996	Oldham Athletic	H	3–1	Hopkin 11', 23', Dyer 44'	12,822
27 August 1996	West Bromwich Albion	H	0–0		13,849
31 August 1996	Huddersfield Town	A	1–1	Freedman 69'	11,166
7 September 1996	Stoke City	A	2–2	Hopkin 13', Freedman 22'	13,540
10 September 1996	Ipswich Town	H	0–0		12,520
14 September 1996	Manchester City	H	3–1	Hopkin 12', 49' Andersen 31'	17,638
21 September 1996	Reading	A	6–1	Tuttle 27', Freedman 37', Muscat 50', Dyer 56' (pen.), Veart 58', Ndah 77'	9,675
28 September 1996	Southend United	H	6–1	Muscat 2, Houghton 38', Hopkin 49', Veart 53', Dyer 72', Freedman 79'	14,858
1 October 1996	Portsmouth	A	2–2	Veart 28', Freedman 63'	7,212
12 October 1996	Barnsley	A	0–0		9,183
16 October 1996	Port Vale	A	2–0	Dyer 2', Roberts 15'	4,522
19 October 1996	Swindon Town	H	1–2	Dyer 23' (pen.)	15,088
26 October 1996	Grimsby Town	H	3–0	Dyer 44', Veart 56', Freedman 29'	13,665
29 October 1996	Bradford City	A	4–0	Shipperley 36', 38', Freedman 58', Hopkin 83'	10,091
2 November 1996	Tranmere Rovers	A	3–1	Dyer 15', Freedman 48', Hopkin 85	8,613
10 November 1996	Queens Park Rangers	H	3–0	Dyer 40', Shipperley 71', Hopkin 90	15,324
16 November 1996	Bolton Wanderers	A	2–2	Hopkin 39', Freedman 41'	16,892
23 November 1996	Wolverhampton Wanderers	H	2–3	Veart 51', Dyer 55'	20,655
30 November 1996	Grimsby Town	A	1–2	Shipperley 5'	5,115
7 December 1996	Oxford United	H	2–2	Dyer 16', 80'	17,879
14 December 1996	Norwich City	A	1–1	Shipperley 3'	16,395
17 December 1996	Sheffield United	H	0–1		12,801
21 December 1996	Charlton Athletic	H	1–0	Shipperley 87'	16,279
26 December 1996	Ipswich Town	A	1–3	Gordon 65' (pen.)	16,020
11 January 1997	Manchester City	A	1–1	Ndah 83'	27,395
18 January 1997	Portsmouth	H	1–2	Quinn 30'	15,498
28 January 1997	Southend United	A	1–2	Freedman 68'	5,061
1 February 1997	Queens Park Rangers	A	1–0	Hopkin 22'	16,467
8 February 1997	Bradford City	H	3–1	Shipperley 61', Ndah 65', Freedman 74'	14,844
15 February 1997	Wolverhampton Wanderers	A	3–0	Tuttle 17', Veart 72', Dyer 73'	25,919
22 February 1997	Tranmere Rovers	H	0–1		15,396
1 March 1997	Oxford United	A	4–1	Gordon 37', Dyer 50', 82', Hopkin 63'	8,572
4 March 1997	Bolton Wanderers	H	1–1	Linighan 50'	16,035
8 March 1997	Charlton Athletic	A	1–2	Dyer 60'	15,000
15 March 1997	Norwich City	H	2–0	Gordon 30' (pen), McKenzie 35'	17,378
23 March 1997	Oldham Athletic	A	1–0	McKenzie 3'	5,282
29 March 1997	Birmingham City	H	0–1		16,331
5 April 1997	Huddersfield Town	H	1–1	Shipperley 52'	13,541
9 April 1997	West Bromwich Albion	A	0–1		12,866
12 April 1997	Sheffield United	A	0–3		20,051
15 April 1997	Stoke City	H	2–0	Dyer 6', 21'	11,382
19 April 1997	Barnsley	H	1–1	Shipperley 30'	20,006
23 April 1997	Reading	H	3–2	Linighan 13', Hopkin 49', Shipperley 69'	12,552
26 April 1997	Swindon Town	A	2–0	Shipperley 44', 89'	10,447
4 May 1997	Port Vale	H	1–1	Roberts 12'	16,401

=== First Division play-offs ===
Round	Date	Opponent	Venue	Result	Attendance	Goalscorers
SF 1st leg	10 May 1997	Wolverhampton Wanderers	H	3–1	21,053	Shipperly 68', Freedman 89', 90'
SF 2nd leg	14 May 1996	Wolverhampton Wanderers	A	1–2	26,403	Hopkin 66'
Final	26 May 1996	Sheffield United	N	1–0	64,383	Hopkin 90'

== Players ==
=== First-team squad ===
Squad at end of season

Note: Flags indicate national team as defined under FIFA eligibility rules; some limited exceptions apply. Players may hold more than one non-FIFA nationality.

No.	Pos.	Nation	Player
—	GK	ENG	Tom Evans (Note: Evans was born in Doncaster, England, but also qualified to represent Northern Ireland internationally and would represent them at B level.)
—	GK	ENG	Carlo Nash
—	GK	ENG	Chris Day
—	DF	ENG	Danny Boxall (Note: Boxall was born in Croydon, England, but also qualified to represent the Republic of Ireland internationally and would later represent them at U-21 level.)
—	DF	ENG	Sagi Burton (Note: Burton was born in Birmingham, England, but also qualified to represent Saint Kitts and Nevis internationally and would make his international debut for Saint Kitts and Nevis in June 2004.)
—	DF	ENG	Andy Cyrus
—	DF	ENG	Marc Edworthy
—	DF	ENG	Dean Gordon
—	DF	ENG	Andy Linighan
—	DF	AUS	Kevin Muscat (Note: Muscat was born in Crawley, England, but also qualified to represent Australia internationally and represented them at U-20 and U-23 level before making his international debut for Australia in September 1994.)
—	DF	ENG	Dave Tuttle
—	DF	WAL	Gareth Davies (Note: Davies was born in Hereford, England, but was raised in Wales and has represented them at U-21 level.)
—	DF	IRL	Rob Quinn (Note: Quinn was born in Bexley, England, but also qualified to represent the Republic of Ireland internationally and would represent them at U-21 and B level.)
—	DF	NOR	Leif Andersen
—	MF	ENG	Hayden Mullins
—	MF	ENG	Darren Pitcher
—	MF	ENG	Andy Roberts
—	MF	ENG	Simon Rodger

No.	Pos.	Nation	Player
—	MF	SCO	David Hopkin
—	MF	SCO	Steven Thomson
—	MF	NIR	Wayne Carlisle
—	MF	NIR	Gareth Graham
—	MF	IRL	Tony Folan (Note: Folan was born in Croydon, England, but was raised in the Republic of Ireland and represented them at U-19 and U-21 level.)
—	MF	IRL	Ray Houghton (Note: Houghton was born in Glasgow, Scotland, but also qualified to represent the Republic of Ireland internationally through his father and made his international debut for the Republic of Ireland in March 1986.)
—	MF	IRL	Richard Kennedy
—	MF	IRL	Tony Scully
—	MF	AUS	Carl Veart
—	FW	ENG	Bruce Dyer (Note: Dyer was born in Redbridge, England, and represented them at U-21 level, but played a friendly game for Montserrat against Ashford Town in September 2007.)
—	FW	ENG	Jason Harris
—	FW	ENG	Leon McKenzie
—	FW	ENG	Clinton Morrison (Note: Morrison was born in Wandsworth, England, but also qualified to represent the Republic of Ireland internationally through his grandmother and would make his international debut for the Republic of Ireland in August 2001.)
—	FW	ENG	George Ndah (Note: Ndah was born in Southwark, England, but also qualified to represent Nigeria internationally and was called up by Nigeria in 1999, but was prevented from playing due to injury.)
—	FW	ENG	Neil Shipperley
—	FW	WAL	Andy Martin
—	FW	SCO	Dougie Freedman

=== Left club during season ===
Note: Flags indicate national team as defined under FIFA eligibility rules; some limited exceptions apply. Players may hold more than one non-FIFA nationality.

No.	Pos.	Nation	Player
—	GK	ENG	Bobby Mimms (to Preston North End)
—	DF	ENG	Jamie Vincent (to AFC Bournemouth)

No.	Pos.	Nation	Player
—	MF	WAL	Paul Trollope (Note: Trollope was born in Swindon, England, but qualified to represent Wales internationally and made his international debut for Wales in May 1997.) (on loan from Derby County)
