= 1998–99 Brentford F.C. season =

English football team season

Brentford
1998–99 season
- Chairman-manager: Ron Noades
- Stadium: Griffin Park
- Third Division: 1st (promoted)
- FA Cup: Second round
- League Cup: Second round
- Football League Trophy: Quarter-final
- Top goalscorer: League: Owusu (22); All: Owusu (25)
- Highest home attendance: 9,535
- Lowest home attendance: 3,674
- Average home league attendance: 5,445
Home colours	Away colours

During the 1998–99 English football season, Brentford competed in the Football League Third Division. The club finished the season as champions after victory over runners-up Cambridge United on the final day.

== Season summary ==
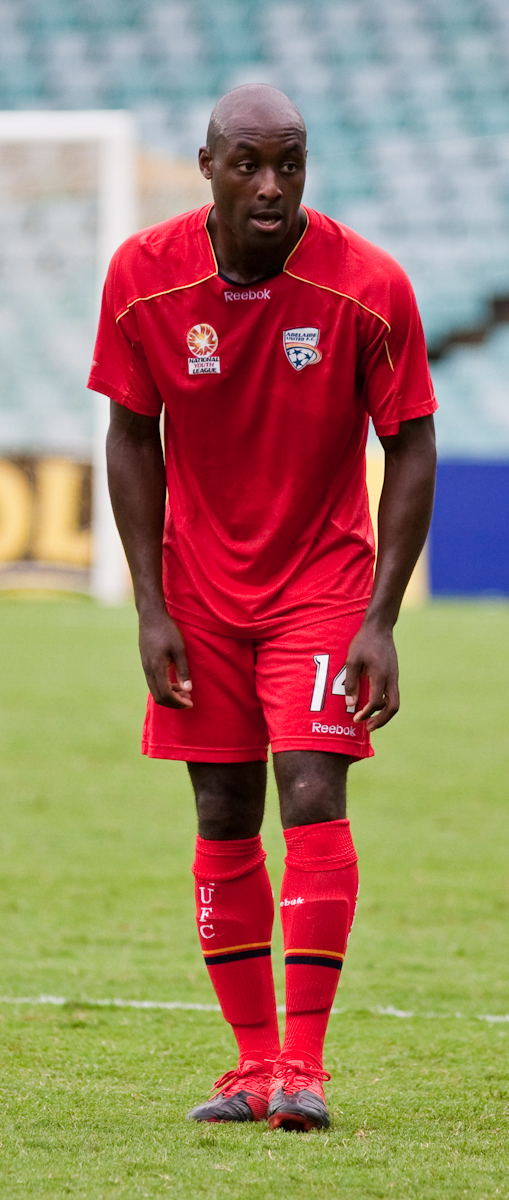
Lloyd Owusu, a £25,000 buy from non-League football, finished the season as top scorer with 25 goals.

After relegation to the Third Division at the end of the previous season, the ownership of Brentford changed hands for the second year in succession, when Ron Noades took over the club as owner and chairman during the 1998 off-season. Noades installed himself as manager and appointed a three-man coaching team of Ray Lewington, Terry Bullivant and Brian Sparrow. Nearly £1.5 million was spent on assembling almost an entirely new starting lineup, with goalkeeper Jason Pearcey, defenders Danny Boxall, Darren Powell, Rob Quinn and Hermann Hreiðarsson (the club's then-record £750,000 signing), midfielders Martin Rowlands and Tony Folan and forwards Lloyd Owusu and Darren Freeman added to the ranks.

9 wins in the opening 13 league matches put the Bees firmly in control at the top of the table, though three successive defeats in the midst of the run temporarily dropped the club back to 7th place. There was some early-season excitement in the League Cup, with a 4–2 aggregate victory over First Division club West Bromwich Albion in the first round setting up a two-legged tie with Premier League club Tottenham Hotspur. 3–2 defeats in each of the two legs (with Brentford taking the lead in both matches) ended the run, with memorable goals being scored by Andy Scott, Darren Freeman and Lloyd Owusu.

Three league defeats in a four-match spell in November and injuries and suspensions to Andy Scott, Darren Powell, Danny Boxall, Jamie Bates and Martin Rowlands led Noades to further strengthen the squad with forward Leo Fortune-West and midfielder Gavin Mahon. Though Fortune-West would be sold on a matter of months later, Mahon replaced Warren Aspinall in midfield and remained an ever-present until the end of the season. Five wins in the following six league matches saw the club begin 1999 firmly placed in the automatic promotion places. A spell of just one win from a spell of seven league matches in January and February saw Noades reach for the chequebook again and sign forward Scott Partridge from Torquay United for £100,000.

With the purchase of new captain Paul Evans and buoyed by the goalscoring of Partridge and Owusu, the Bees went undefeated from late February through to early May. The club secured automatic promotion back to the Second Division with two matches to spare after a 3–0 victory over Exeter City on 1 May. A 4–1 win over Swansea City in the following match returned Brentford to the top of the table for the first time since 20 October 1998. The victory set up a "winner takes all" match for the title on the final day at the Abbey Stadium versus nearest challengers Cambridge United. Lloyd Owusu's 25th goal of the season was enough for victory and for Brentford to win the Third Division championship.

== League table ==
Pos	Team	Pld	W	D	L	GF	GA	GD	Pts	Promotion or relegation
1	Brentford (C, P)	46	26	7	13	79	56	+23	85	Promotion to the Second Division
2	Cambridge United (P)	46	23	12	11	78	48	+30	81	Promotion to the Second Division
3	Cardiff City (P)	46	22	14	10	60	39	+21	80	Promotion to the Second Division
4	Scunthorpe United (O, P)	46	22	8	16	69	58	+11	74	Qualification for the Third Division play-offs
5	Rotherham United	46	20	13	13	79	61	+18	73	Qualification for the Third Division play-offs

Rules for classification: 1) Points; 2) Goals scored; 3) Goal difference
(C) Champions; (O) Play-off winners; (P) Promoted

== Results ==
Brentford's goal tally listed first.

=== Legend ===
Win	Draw	Loss

=== Pre-season ===
Date	Opponent	Venue	Result	Attendance	Scorer(s)	Notes
10 July 1998	Hampton	A	4–0	n/a	Taylor, Scott, Freeman	
13 July 1998	Bashley	A	2–2	n/a	Rapley, McGhee	
15 July 1998	Chesham United	A	6–0	n/a	McGhee (3), Thompson, Taylor, Anderson	
18 July 1998	Millwall	H	2–0	0	Rapley, McGhee	(Note: Match played behind closed doors.)
28 July 1998	Queens Park Rangers	H	0–0	4,706		
1 August 1998	Crawley Town	A	0–0	n/a		

=== Football League Third Division ===
No.	Date	Opponent	Venue	Result	Attendance	Scorer(s)
1	8 August 1998	Mansfield Town	H	3–0	4,846	Rapley (2), Freeman
2	15 August 1998	Halifax Town	A	0–1	3,876	
3	22 August 1998	Brighton & Hove Albion	H	2–0	6,355	Thomas (og), Scott
4	29 August 1998	Barnet	A	3–0	2,710	Quinn, Rowlands, Owusu
5	31 August 1998	Rochdale	H	2–1	4,873	Powell, Rapley
6	5 September 1999	Hull City	A	3–2	4,058	Owusu, Aspinall, Scott
7	8 September 1998	Torquay United	A	1–3	2,340	Bates
8	12 September 1998	Rotherham United	H	0–3	4,803	
9	19 September 1998	Scarborough	A	1–3	2,028	Owusu
10	26 September 1998	Darlington	H	3–0	4,486	Powell, Rowlands, Owusu
11	3 October 1998	Peterborough United	A	4–2	6,056	Freeman, Scott (2), Folan
12	17 October 1998	Hartlepool United	H	3–1	4,883	Freeman, Aspinall (pen), Rowlands
13	20 October 1998	Scunthorpe United	H	2–1	4,700	Scott, Owusu
14	3 November 1998	Plymouth Argyle	A	0–3	4,650	
15	7 November 1998	Shrewsbury Town	A	0–2	2,799	
16	10 November 1998	Southend United	H	4–1	4,285	Owusu (3), Freeman
17	21 November 1998	Leyton Orient	A	1–2	6,340	Folan
18	28 November 1998	Chester City	H	2–1	5,173	Owusu, Rowlands
19	12 December 1998	Exeter City	A	1–0	2,793	Owusu
20	18 December 1998	Cambridge United	H	1–0	5,069	Folan
21	26 December 1998	Brighton & Hove Albion	A	1–3	4,838	Freeman
22	28 December 1998	Cardiff City	H	1–0	9,535	Hreiðarsson
23	2 January 1999	Barnet	H	3–1	6,011	Freeman, Bryan, Mahon
24	9 January 1999	Mansfield Town	A	1–3	4,095	Owusu
25	23 January 1999	Rochdale	A	0–2	2,113	
26	30 January 1999	Cardiff City	A	1–4	11,509	Boxall
27	2 February 1999	Carlisle United	H	1–1	3,674	Barr (og)
28	6 February 1999	Hull City	H	0–2	5,086	
29	13 February 1999	Torquay United	H	3–2	4,299	Owusu, Bryan, Hreiðarsson
30	16 February 1999	Swansea City	A	1–2	5,109	Hreiðarsson
31	20 February 1999	Rotherham United	A	4–2	3,899	Mahon, Owusu (3)
32	27 February 1999	Scarborough	H	1–1	4,783	Bryan
33	9 March 1999	Peterborough United	H	3–0	4,195	Partridge, Mahon, Owusu
34	13 March 1999	Shrewsbury Town	H	0–0	5,082	
35	16 March 1999	Halifax Town	H	1–1	3,713	Partridge
36	20 March 1999	Carlisle United	A	1–0	2,564	Partridge
37	3 April 1999	Hartlepool United	A	1–0	2,719	Owusu
38	5 April 1999	Plymouth Argyle	H	3–1	6,979	Evans, Mahon, Folan
39	10 April 1999	Scunthorpe United	A	0–0	5,604	
40	13 April 1999	Chester City	A	3–1	1,766	Anderson, Evans, Bryan
41	17 April 1999	Leyton Orient	H	0–0	8,245	
42	24 April 1999	Southend United	A	4–1	5,248	Owusu (3), Partridge
43	27 April 1999	Darlington	A	2–2	2,514	Scott, Partridge
44	1 May 1999	Exeter City	H	3–0	6,977	Quinn, Scott, Partridge
45	4 May 1999	Swansea City	H	4–1	7,156	Owusu, Evans, Hreiðarsson, Partridge
46	8 May 1999	Cambridge United	A	1–0	8,936	Owusu

=== FA Cup ===
Round	Date	Opponent	Venue	Result	Attendance	Scorer(s)	Notes
R1	14 November 1998	Camberley Town	H	5–0	4,783	Bates, Quinn, Folan (2), Hreiðarsson	(Note: Despite the match taking place at Griffin Park, Brentford wore their away strip, due to competition rules stating "where the colours (shirts, shorts or stockings) of the two competing clubs are similar, both clubs must change, unless arrangements are mutually agreed by the competing clubs".)
R2	5 December 1998	Oldham Athletic	A	1–1	4,217	Freeman (pen)	
R2 (replay)	15 December 1998	Oldham Athletic	H	2–2 (a.e.t.), lost 4–2 on pens)	4,375	Owusu, Freeman	

=== Football League Cup ===
Round	Date	Opponent	Venue	Result	Attendance	Scorer(s)
R1 (1st leg)	11 August 1998	West Bromwich Albion	A	1–2	8,460	Rapley
R1 (2nd leg)	18 August 1998	West Bromwich Albion	H	3–0 (won 4–2 on aggregate)	4,664	Bates, Oatway, Owusu
R2 (1st leg)	15 September 1998	Tottenham Hotspur	H	2–3	11,831	Scott, Freeman
R2 (2nd leg)	23 September 1998	Tottenham Hotspur	A	2–3 (lost 6–4 on aggregate)	22,980	Scott, Owusu

=== Football League Trophy ===
Round	Date	Opponent	Venue	Result	Attendance	Scorer(s)
SR1	8 December 1998	Plymouth Argyle	H	2–0	1,580	Hreiðarsson, Rowlands
SR2	5 January 1999	Wycombe Wanderers	A	4–1	2,010	Fortune-West, Scott (2), Quinn
SR3	19 January 1999	Walsall	H	0–0 (a.e.t.), lost 4–3 on pens)	2,048	

- Sources: Soccerbase, 11v11, Brentford Official Matchday Magazine

== Playing squad ==
Players' ages are as of the opening day of the 1998–99 season.

Position	Name	Nationality	Date of birth (age)	Signed from	Signed in	Notes
Goalkeepers
GK	Kevin Dearden	(England)	8 March 1970 (aged 28)	Tottenham Hotspur	1993	Loaned to Barnet and Huddersfield Town
GK	Jason Pearcey	(England)	23 July 1971 (aged 27)	Grimsby Town	1998	
GK	Andy Woodman	(England)	11 August 1971 (aged 26)	Northampton Town	1999	Loaned from Northampton Town before transferring permanently
Defenders
DF	Ijah Anderson	(England)	30 December 1975 (aged 22)	Southend United	1995	
DF	Danny Boxall	(Republic of Ireland)	24 August 1977 (aged 20)	Crystal Palace	1998	
DF	Danny Cullip	(England)	17 September 1976 (aged 21)	Fulham	1998	
DF	Michael Dobson	(England)	9 April 1981 (aged 17)	Youth	1999	
DF	Hermann Hreiðarsson	(Iceland)	11 July 1974 (aged 24)	Crystal Palace	1998	
DF	Darren Powell	(England)	10 March 1976 (aged 22)	Hampton	1998	
DF	Rob Quinn	(Republic of Ireland)	8 November 1976 (aged 21)	Crystal Palace	1998	
DF	Paul Watson	(England)	4 January 1975 (aged 23)	Fulham	1997	
Midfielders
MF	Dean Clark	(England)	31 March 1980 (aged 18)	Youth	1997	
MF	Kevin Dennis	(England)	14 December 1976 (aged 21)	Arsenal	1996	Loaned to Chesham United and Welling United
MF	Paul Evans (c)	(Wales)	1 September 1974 (aged 23)	Shrewsbury Town	1999	
MF	Tony Folan	(Republic of Ireland)	18 September 1978 (aged 19)	Crystal Palace	1998	
MF	Dirk Hebel	(Germany)	24 November 1974 (aged 23)	Tranmere Rovers	1998	
MF	Gavin Mahon	(England)	2 January 1977 (aged 21)	Hereford United	1998	
MF	Charlie Oatway	(England)	28 November 1973 (aged 24)	Torquay United	1997	Loaned to Lincoln City
MF	Martin Rowlands	(Republic of Ireland)	8 February 1979 (aged 19)	Farnborough Town	1998	
Forwards
FW	Derek Bryan	(England)	11 November 1974 (aged 23)	Hampton	1997	
FW	Darren Freeman	(England)	22 August 1973 (aged 24)	Fulham	1998	
FW	Lloyd Owusu	(Ghana)	12 November 1976 (aged 21)	Slough Town	1998	
FW	Scott Partridge	(England)	13 October 1974 (aged 23)	Torquay United	1999	
FW	Andy Scott	(England)	2 August 1972 (aged 26)	Sheffield United	1997	
Players who left the club mid-season
DF	Jamie Bates	(England)	24 February 1968 (aged 30)	Youth	1986	Transferred to Wycombe Wanderers
DF	Mohamed Berthé	(France)	12 September 1972 (aged 25)	Bournemouth	1999	Returned to Bournemouth after loan
DF	Chris Coyne	(Australia)	28 December 1978 (aged 19)	West Ham United	1998	Returned to West Ham United after loan
DF	Stephen Jenkins	(England)	2 January 1980 (aged 18)	Southampton	1999	Returned to Southampton after loan
MF	Warren Aspinall	(England)	13 September 1967 (aged 30)	Carlisle United	1997	Loaned to Colchester United, transferred to Colchester United
FW	Drewe Broughton	(England)	25 October 1978 (aged 19)	Norwich City	1998	Transferred to Peterborough United
FW	Leo Fortune-West	(England)	9 April 1971 (aged 27)	Lincoln City	1998	Transferred to Rotherham United
FW	Kevin Rapley	(England)	21 September 1977 (aged 20)	Youth	1997	Loaned to Southend United and Notts County; Transferred to Notts County

- Source: Soccerbase

== Coaching staff ==
Name	Role
(England) Ron Noades	Manager
(England) Ray Lewington	First-team coach
(England) Terry Bullivant	Assistant coach
(England) Brian Sparrow	Assistant coach
(England) John Griffin	Chief scout
(England) Gerry Delahunt	Physiotherapist
(England) Colin Martin	Medical Officer
(England) Laurence Nathan	Medical Officer

== Statistics ==
=== Appearances and goals ===
Substitute appearances in brackets.

Pos	Nat	Name	League		FA Cup		League Cup		FL Trophy		Total	
Pos	Nat	Name	Apps	Goals	Apps	Goals	Apps	Goals	Apps	Goals	Apps	Goals
GK	(England)	Kevin Dearden	7	0	1	0	1	0	2	0	11	0
GK	(England)	Jason Pearcey	17	0	2	0	3	0	1	0	23	0
GK	(England)	Andy Woodman	22	0	—		—		—		22	0
DF	(England)	Ijah Anderson	35 (3)	1	1 (1)	0	3	0	2	0	41 (4)	1
DF	(England)	Jamie Bates	27	1	3	1	4	1	2	0	36	3
DF	(Republic of Ireland)	Danny Boxall	37 (1)	1	2	0	4	0	2	0	45 (1)	1
DF	(England)	Danny Cullip	2	0	0	0	2	0	0	0	4	0
DF	(Iceland)	Hermann Hreiðarsson	33	4	2	1	—		3	1	38	6
DF	(England)	Darren Powell	33	2	0	0	3	0	0 (1)	0	36 (1)	2
DF	(Republic of Ireland)	Rob Quinn	34 (9)	2	3	1	4	0	3	1	44 (9)	4
DF	(England)	Paul Watson	12	0	2	0	2	0	0 (1)	0	16 (1)	0
MF	(England)	Warren Aspinall	17 (2)	2	1 (1)	0	4	0	1	0	23 (3)	2
MF	(Wales)	Paul Evans	14	3	—		—		—		14	3
MF	(Republic of Ireland)	Tony Folan	19 (1)	4	3	2	0 (1)	0	2	0	24 (11)	6
MF	(Germany)	Dirk Hebel	6 (9)	0	2 (1)	0	0	0	1	0	9 (10)	0
MF	(England)	Gavin Mahon	29	4	—		—		3	0	32	4
MF	(England)	Charlie Oatway	7 (17)	0	2	0	1 (2)	1	0 (1)	0	10 (20)	1
MF	(Republic of Ireland)	Martin Rowlands	32 (4)	4	3	0	4	0	3 (1)	1	42 (4)	5
FW	(England)	Drewe Broughton	1	0	—		—		—		1	0
FW	(England)	Derek Bryan	9 (11)	4	0 (2)	0	0	0	1 (1)	0	10 (14)	4
FW	(England)	Leo Fortune-West	2 (9)	0	0 (1)	0	—		2 (1)	1	4 (11)	1
FW	(England)	Darren Freeman	16 (6)	6	3	2	4	1	1	0	24 (6)	9
FW	(Ghana)	Lloyd Owusu	42 (4)	22	3	1	0 (4)	2	2 (1)	0	47 (9)	25
FW	(England)	Scott Partridge	12 (2)	7	—		—		—		12 (2)	7
FW	(England)	Kevin Rapley	3 (9)	3	0 (1)	0	0 (4)	1	—		3 (14)	4
FW	(England)	Andy Scott	31 (3)	7	0	0	4	2	2	2	37 (3)	11
Players loaned in during the season
DF	(Australia)	Chris Coyne	7	0	—		1	0	—		8	0
DF	(England)	Stephen Jenkins	0 (1)	0	—		—		—		0 (1)	0

- Players listed in italics left the club mid-season.
- Source: Soccerbase

=== Goalscorers ===
Pos	Nat	Player	FL3	FAC	FLC	FLT	Total
FW	(Ghana)	Lloyd Owusu	22	1	2	0	25
FW	(England)	Andy Scott	7	0	2	2	11
FW	(England)	Darren Freeman	6	2	1	0	9
FW	(England)	Scott Partridge	7	—	—	—	7
DF	(Iceland)	Hermann Hreiðarsson	4	1	—	1	6
MF	(Republic of Ireland)	Tony Folan	4	2	0	0	6
DF	(Republic of Ireland)	Martin Rowlands	4	0	0	1	5
MF	(England)	Gavin Mahon	4	0	—	0	4
FW	(England)	Derek Bryan	4	0	0	0	4
FW	(England)	Kevin Rapley	3	0	1	—	4
DF	(Republic of Ireland)	Rob Quinn	2	1	0	1	4
MF	(Wales)	Paul Evans	3	—	—	—	3
DF	(England)	Jamie Bates	1	1	1	0	3
MF	(England)	Warren Aspinall	2	0	0	0	2
DF	(England)	Darren Powell	2	0	0	0	2
DF	(England)	Ijah Anderson	1	0	0	0	1
DF	(Republic of Ireland)	Danny Boxall	1	0	0	0	1
MF	(England)	Charlie Oatway	0	0	1	0	1
FW	(England)	Leo Fortune-West	0	0	—	1	1
Opponents			2	0	0	0	2
Total			79	8	8	6	101

- Players listed in italics left the club mid-season.
- Source: Soccerbase

=== Discipline ===
Pos	Nat	Player	FL3		FAC		FLC		FLT		Total		Pts
Pos	Nat	Player	Yellow card	Red card	Yellow card	Red card	Yellow card	Red card	Yellow card	Red card	Yellow card	Red card	Pts
DF	(England)	Jamie Bates	6	1	0	1	0	0	0	0	6	2	12
DF	(Republic of Ireland)	Danny Boxall	7	0	0	0	1	0	0	0	8	0	8
FW	(England)	Darren Freeman	2	1	2	0	1	0	0	0	5	1	8
DF	(Republic of Ireland)	Martin Rowlands	6	0	0	0	1	0	0	0	7	0	7
DF	(Iceland)	Hermann Hreiðarsson	5	0	0	0	—		1	0	6	0	6
DF	(England)	Ijah Anderson	5	0	0	0	1	0	0	0	6	0	6
DF	(Republic of Ireland)	Rob Quinn	5	0	0	0	1	0	0	0	6	0	6
DF	(England)	Darren Powell	5	0	0	0	0	0	0	0	5	0	5
FW	(Ghana)	Lloyd Owusu	4	0	0	0	0	0	0	0	4	0	4
MF	(England)	Warren Aspinall	3	0	0	0	0	0	0	0	3	0	3
FW	(England)	Derek Bryan	3	0	0	0	0	0	0	0	3	0	3
DF	(England)	Paul Watson	3	0	0	0	0	0	0	0	3	0	3
FW	(England)	Leo Fortune-West	2	0	0	0	—		1	0	3	0	3
MF	(Wales)	Paul Evans	2	0	—		—		—		2	0	2
MF	(England)	Gavin Mahon	2	0	0	0	—		0	0	2	0	2
DF	(England)	Danny Cullip	1	0	0	0	1	0	0	0	2	0	2
FW	(England)	Scott Partridge	1	0	—		—		—		1	0	1
GK	(England)	Kevin Dearden	1	0	0	0	0	0	0	0	1	0	1
MF	(Republic of Ireland)	Tony Folan	1	0	0	0	0	0	0	0	1	0	1
MF	(Germany)	Dirk Hebel	1	0	0	0	0	0	0	0	1	0	1
FW	(England)	Andy Scott	1	0	0	0	0	0	0	0	1	0	1
MF	(England)	Charlie Oatway	0	0	0	0	0	0	1	0	1	0	1
Total			66	2	2	1	6	0	2	0	76	3	85

- Players listed in italics left the club mid-season.
- Source: Soccerbase

=== International caps ===
Pos	Nat	Player	Caps	Goals	Ref
DF	(Iceland)	Hermann Hreiðarsson	8	1	

=== Management ===
Name	Nat	From	To	Record All Comps					Record League				
Name	Nat	From	To	P	W	D	L	W %	P	W	D	L	W %
Ron Noades	(England)	8 August 1998	8 May 1999	56	30	10	16	53.57|	46	26	7	13	56.52

=== Summary ===
Games played	56 (46 Third Division, 3 FA Cup, 4 League Cup, 3 Football League Trophy)
Games won	30 (26 Third Division, 1 FA Cup, 1 League Cup, 2 Football League Trophy)
Games drawn	10 (7 Third Division, 2 FA Cup, 0 League Cup, 1 Football League Trophy)
Games lost	16 (13 Third Division, 0 FA Cup, 3 League Cup, 0 Football League Trophy)
Goals scored	101 (79 Third Division, 8 FA Cup, 8 League Cup, 6 Football League Trophy)
Goals conceded	68 (56 Third Division, 3 FA Cup, 8 League Cup, 1 Football League Trophy)
Clean sheets	18 (14 Third Division, 1 FA Cup, 1 League Cup, 2 Football League Trophy)
Biggest league win	3–0 on five occasions, 4–1 on three occasions
Worst league defeat	3–0 on two occasions, 4–1 versus Cardiff City, 30 January 1999
Most appearances	56, Lloyd Owusu (46 Third Division, 3 FA Cup, 4 League Cup, 3 Football League Trophy)
Top scorer (league)	22, Lloyd Owusu
Top scorer (all competitions)	25, Lloyd Owusu

== Transfers & loans ==
Players transferred in
Date	Pos.	Name	Previous club	Fee	Ref.
7 July 1998	FW	(England) Darren Freeman	(England) Fulham	Free	
9 July 1998	DF	(Republic of Ireland) Danny Boxall	(England) Crystal Palace	Free	
9 July 1998	GK	(England) Jason Pearcey	(England) Grimsby Town	Free	
9 July 1998	DF	(Republic of Ireland) Rob Quinn	(England) Crystal Palace	£40,000	
25 July 1998	DF	(England) Darren Powell	(England) Hampton	£15,000	
29 July 1998	FW	(Ghana) Lloyd Owusu	(England) Slough Town	£25,000	
6 August 1998	MF	(Republic of Ireland) Martin Rowlands	(England) Farnborough Town	£45,000	
25 August 1998	MF	(Germany) Dirk Hebel	(England) Tranmere Rovers	Free	
22 September 1998	MF	(Republic of Ireland) Tony Folan	(England) Crystal Palace	£100,000	
24 September 1998	DF	(Iceland) Hermann Hreiðarsson	(England) Crystal Palace	£750,000	
30 October 1998	FW	(England) Drewe Broughton	(England) Norwich City	£15,000	
17 November 1998	FW	(England) Leo Fortune-West	(England) Lincoln City	£60,000	
18 November 1998	MF	(England) Gavin Mahon	(England) Hereford United	£50,000	
28 January 1999	GK	(England) Andy Woodman	(England) Northampton Town	£75,000	
19 February 1998	FW	(England) Scott Partridge	(England) Torquay United	£100,000	
3 March 1999	MF	(Wales) Paul Evans	(England) Shrewsbury Town	£110,000	
Players loaned in
Date from	Pos.	Name	From	Date to	Ref.
21 August 1998	DF	(Australia) Chris Coyne	(England) West Ham United	21 September 1998	
22 January 1999	GK	(England) Andy Woodman	(England) Northampton Town	27 January 1999	
3 March 1999	DF	(France) Mohamed Berthé	(England) Bournemouth	10 March 1999	
25 March 1999	DF	(England) Stephen Jenkins	(England) Southampton	4 April 1999	
Players transferred out
Date	Pos.	Name	Subsequent club	Fee	Ref.
6 July 1998	GK	(England) Carl Hutchings	(England) Bristol City	£135,000	
6 August 1998	MF	(England) Robert Taylor	(England) Gillingham	£400,000	
10 August 1998	MF	(England) Scott Canham	(England) Leyton Orient	Free	
17 November 1998	FW	(England) Drewe Broughton	(England) Peterborough United	£15,000	
9 February 1999	MF	(England) Warren Aspinall	(England) Colchester United	Free	
23 February 1999	FW	(England) Kevin Rapley	(England) Notts County	£50,000	
26 February 1999	FW	(England) Leo Fortune-West	(England) Rotherham United	£35,000	
25 March 1999	DF	(England) Jamie Bates	(England) Wycombe Wanderers	Free	
Players loaned out
Date from	Pos.	Name	To	Date to	Ref.
21 October 1998	MF	(England) Charlie Oatway	(England) Lincoln City	16 November 1998	
20 November 1998	FW	(England) Kevin Rapley	(England) Southend United	20 February 1999	
November 1998	MF	(England) Kevin Dennis	(England) Chesham United	December 1998	
5 February 1999	GK	(England) Kevin Dearden	(England) Barnet	10 March 1999	
8 February 1999	MF	(England) Warren Aspinall	(England) Colchester United	24 March 1999	
8 February 1999	MF	(England) Kevin Dennis	(England) Welling United	8 March 1999	
26 February 1999	MF	(England) Ryan Denys	(England) Carshalton Athletic	End of season	
11 March 1999	GK	(England) Kevin Dearden	(England) Huddersfield Town	End of season	
Players released
Date	Pos.	Name	Subsequent club	Join date	Ref.
1 October 1998	FW	(Canada) Niall Thompson	(Canada) Vancouver 86ers	1998	
January 1999	MF	(England) David McGhee	(England) Stevenage Borough	1 August 1999	
30 June 1999	GK	(England) Kevin Dearden	(Wales) Wrexham	1 July 1999	
30 June 1999	MF	(England) Kevin Dennis	(England) Hampton & Richmond Borough	1 July 1999	
30 June 1999	MF	(England) Ryan Denys	(England) Hampton & Richmond Borough	1 July 1999	
30 June 1999	MF	(Germany) Dirk Hebel	(Germany) Bonner SC	1999	
30 June 1999	DF	Andy Walker	n/a	n/a	

== Kit ==
Supplier: Super League
Sponsor(s): GMB

Home	Away

Source: Brentford F.C.

== Awards ==
- Supporters' Player of the Year: Darren Powell
- Football League Third Division PFA Team of the Year: Paul Evans, Hermann Hreiðarsson
- Football League Third Division Manager of the Month: Ron Noades (August 1998)
- League Managers Association Performance of the Week: Ron Noades (Brentford 3–0 West Bromwich Albion, League Cup first round, second leg, 18 August 1998)
