= Dirk Hebel =

German footballer (born 1972)

Personal information
- Full name: Dirk Josef Hebel
- Date of birth: 24 November 1972 (age 53)
- Place of birth: Cologne, Germany
- Position: Midfielder

Senior career*
Years	Team	Apps	(Gls)
–1997	1. FC Köln	0	(0)
1995	1. FC Köln II	0	(0)
1997	Bursaspor	14	(1)
1997–1998	Tranmere Rovers	0	(0)
1998–1999	Brentford	15	(0)
1999–2000	Bonner SC	19	(1)
2000–2001	SCB Preußen Köln	26	(5)
2001–2002	VfL Köln 99		
2002–2003	FC Junkersdorf		
2003–2005	SF Troisdorf		
- * Club domestic league appearances and goals

Dirk Josef Hebel (born 24 November 1972) is a German former professional footballer who played as a midfielder. As a player, he played professionally in Germany, Turkey and England. He notably won the 1998–99 Third Division championship with Brentford. After retiring as a player, Hebel became an agent and a youth coach

== Playing career ==
=== Germany and Turkey ===
Hebel began his career at hometown club 1. FC Köln. He moved to Turkey to join 1. Lig club Bursaspor in January 1997. Hebel made 14 appearances and scored one goal during the 1996–97 season and helped the Green Crocodiles to a fifth-place finish in the league. One Turkish newspaper voted him the 1996–97 1. Lig Player Of The Season. Hebel left the club after the season.

=== Tranmere Rovers ===
After interest from Grasshopper Club Zürich, Southampton and a failed trial at Norwich City, Hebel transferred to English First Division club Tranmere Rovers on 3 September 1997. He failed to make an appearance for the first team during the 1997–98 season, but was a regular for the reserves and departed the club in May 1998. Looking back in 2005 on his lack of appearances for Tranmere, Hebel said "I think it was a problem of the way I play football, which didn't compare to the way our coach Aldo wanted me to play. It is difficult to change a style you played for 20 years of your life".

=== Brentford ===
Hebel signed for Third Division club Brentford on a free transfer on 25 August 1998. He made regular appearances until Boxing Day 1998 and made his final appearance for the club in a 3–1 victory over Brighton & Hove Albion before injury ended his season. Hebel made 19 appearances during the Bees' Third Division championship-winning 1998–99 season. A family situation saw Hebel turn down a new contract in 1999, in order to return to Germany.

=== Return to Germany ===
Hebel signed for Oberliga Nordrhein club Bonner SC during the 1999 off-season. He made 19 appearances during the 1999–00 season and scored one goal. Hebel joined Oberliga Nordrhein club SCB Preußen Köln during the 2000 off-season. He made 26 appearances and scored five goals during the 2000–01 season, helping the club to a second-place finish behind Bayer Leverkusen II. Hebel wound down his career with spells at VfL Köln 99, FC Junkersdorf and SF Troisdorf, before retiring in 2005. During the 2003–04 season, he helped SF Troisdorf win promotion to the Verbandsliga Mittelrhein.

== Post-playing career ==
In 2002, Hebel became a FIFA-registered agent and set up the Fussballmarkt agency. He has represented players such as Marco Reus, Jeremie Frimpong, Salih Özcan, Thilo Kehrer, Lars Stindl, Ismail Jakobs, Joel Pohjanpalo, Jacob Bruun Larsen, Marcel Hartel or Coach Edin Terzić.

== Personal life ==
Hebel is married to Nicole and has two sons named Darren (named after former Brentford teammate Darren Freeman) and Liam.

== Career statistics ==
Appearances and goals by club, season and competition
Club	Season	League			National cup		League cup		Other		Total	
Club	Season	Division	Apps	Goals	Apps	Goals	Apps	Goals	Apps	Goals	Apps	Goals
Bursaspor	1996–97	1. Lig	14	1	—		—		—		14	1
Tranmere Rovers	1997–98	First Division	0	0	0	0	0	0	—		0	0
Brentford	1998–99	Third Division	15	0	3	0	0	0	1 (Note: Appearance in Football League Trophy)	0	19	0
Bonner SC	1999–2000	Oberliga Nordrhein	19	1	—		—		—		19	1
SCB Preußen Köln	2000–01	Oberliga Nordrhein	26	5	—		—		—		26	5
Career total			74	7	3	0	0	0	1	0	78	7

== Honours ==
Brentford

- Football League Third Division: 1998–99
