= Hermann Hreiðarsson =

Icelandic footballer and coach (born 1974)

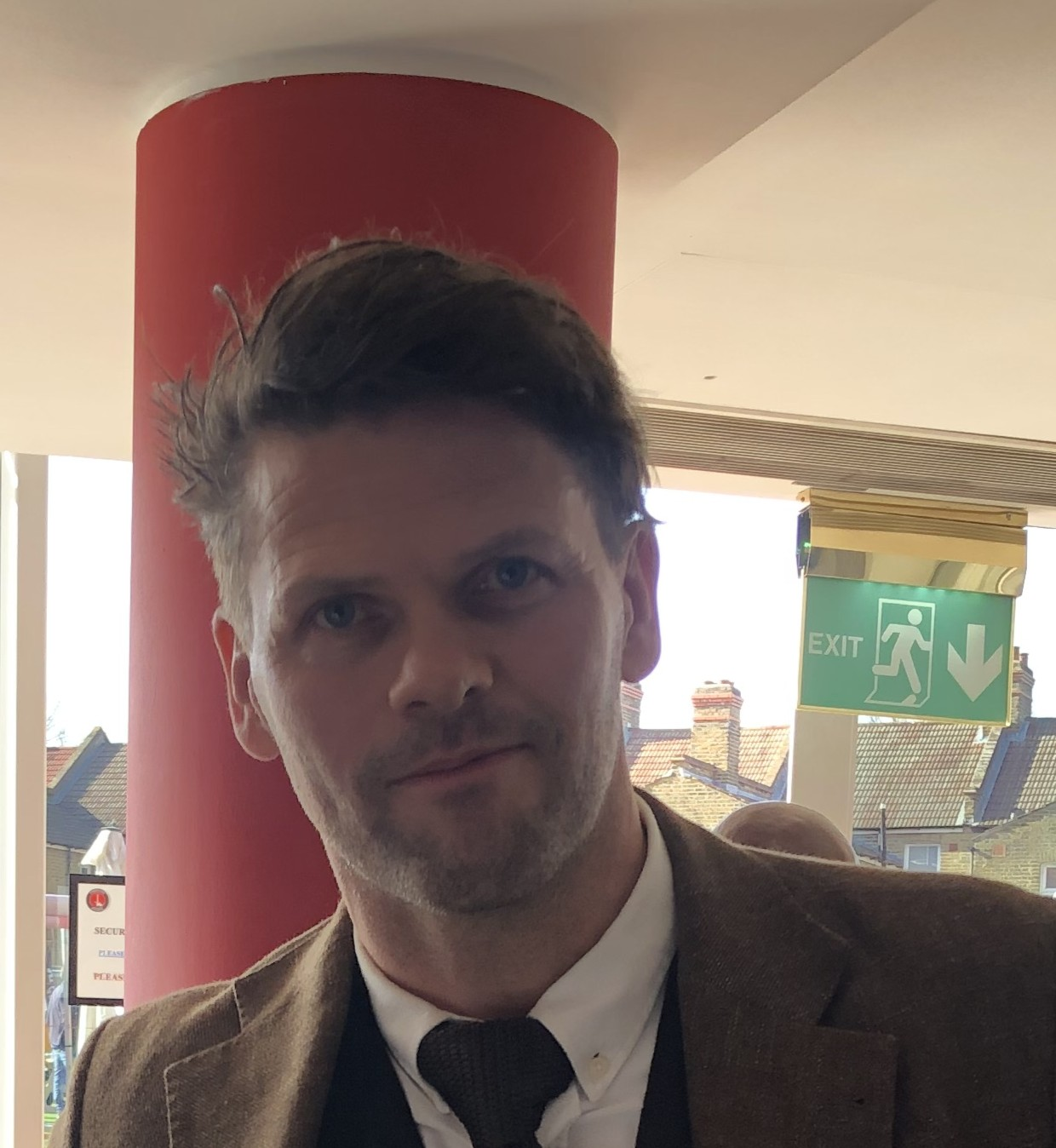
- Hermann in 2025

Personal information
- Date of birth: 11 July 1974 (age 52)
- Place of birth: Reykjavík, Iceland
- Height: 1.91 m (6 ft 3 in)
- Positions: Left-back; centre-back

Team information
- Current team: Valur (manager)

Senior career*
Years	Team	Apps	(Gls)
1993–1997	ÍBV	66	(5)
1997–1998	Crystal Palace	37	(2)
1998–1999	Brentford	41	(6)
1999–2000	Wimbledon	25	(1)
2000–2003	Ipswich Town	102	(2)
2003–2007	Charlton Athletic	132	(3)
2007–2012	Portsmouth	102	(7)
2012	Coventry City	2	(0)
2013	ÍBV	4	(0)
2014	Fylkir	0	(0)
Total		511	(26)

International career
1995	Iceland U-21	6	(1)
1996–2011	Iceland	89	(5)

Managerial career
- 2013: ÍBV
- 2015–2016: Fylkir
- 2017–2018: Fylkir (women)
- 2020–2021: Þróttur Vogum
- 2021–2024: ÍBV
- 2024-2025: HK
- 2025–: Valur
- * Club domestic league appearances and goals

Hermann Hreiðarsson (born 11 July 1974) is an Icelandic professional football manager and former player who is the manager of Besta deild karla club Valur. A former defender, he spent 15 seasons in England, gaining a total of 332 appearances in the Premier League.

Hermann was relegated from the Premier League five times, a record he holds jointly with Nathan Blake. He was relegated with every Premier League club he has played for: Crystal Palace (1997–98 season), Wimbledon (1999–2000), Ipswich Town (2001–02), Charlton Athletic (2006–07), and Portsmouth (2009–10).

== Club career ==
=== Early career ===
In 1993, Hermann started playing for his local club ÍBV, where he took part in five seasons with the team. He only played three matches out of 18 in his first season as the club finished 8th out of 10, but played all the matches in the next two seasons with the club finishing 8th and then 3rd. He then played every match but one in his fourth season as the club finished 4th. He left before the completion of his last season, but the club ended up as champions of Iceland for the second time and for the first time in 18 years, with Hermann playing a big role in the turnaround of the club's fortunes.

In 1997, Hermann was scouted by Premier League newcomers Crystal Palace. He came into English football in August that year when Palace signed him up. He was one of the team's few stand-out players in a season where Palace were relegated. At Palace, Hermann scored league goals against Sheffield Wednesday and Chelsea, with the latter goal briefly giving Palace the lead at Stamford Bridge. He also scored once in the League Cup against Torquay United.

=== Brentford ===
In September 1998, Hermann opted to move further down The Football League and followed recently departed Crystal Palace chairman Ron Noades to Brentford, where Noades was now chairman as well as the manager. He joined the London-based Third Division side for a then-club record incoming fee of £750,000.

Brentford were champions of the Third Division and Hermann scored six goals, but in October 1999, he signed for Premier League side Wimbledon in a deal worth £2.5 million, which remained Brentford's record transfer fee received until September 2014. They were later relegated from the top flight that season. During his time at Wimbledon, he scored once against West Ham United.

=== Ipswich Town ===
A £4.5 million move before the 2000–01 season saw him become newly promoted Ipswich Town's record signing. Ipswich finished fifth in the club's first season back in the Premier League, thus securing a UEFA Cup place. The following season, there was a complete reversal of fortunes, and they were relegated. Ipswich trimmed their squad to save on finances, but Hermann turned down a move to newly promoted West Bromwich Albion at the start of the 2002–03 season – reportedly due to West Bromwich offering him vastly reduced wages compared to what he was currently receiving, and also Hermann not wanting to face another relegation battle. At Ipswich he scored league goals against Manchester City and West Ham United and scored once in the UEFA Cup against Helsingborg.

=== Charlton Athletic ===
In March 2003, Hermann moved on from Ipswich, joining Premier League side Charlton Athletic. He signed a three-and-a-half-year contract, with the club paying £800,000, plus a further £100,000 if they were not relegated in the 2003–04 season to Hermann. He was able to move to Charlton outside the Premier League's transfer window as Ipswich were in administration, although he would not be eligible to play for the club for the remainder of that season.

Hermann proved his worth for Charlton after making his debut in a 3–0 home defeat at the hands of Manchester City. He would miss only five matches in his debut season, and would be a regular starter in subsequent years.

=== Portsmouth ===
On 25 May 2007, Hermann exercised a clause in his contract with Charlton which allowed him to leave on a free transfer if they were relegated and signed a two-year deal with fellow Premier League club Portsmouth. On 29 September, Hermann scored his first goal for Portsmouth in a 7–4 Premier League win at home against Reading. He followed that up with another goal the following weekend against Fulham. On 20 April 2008, Hermann was sent off for a professional foul on Darius Vassell at the City of Manchester Stadium against Manchester City, but his season ended well by lifting the FA Cup after a 1–0 victory over Cardiff City at Wembley Stadium.

Hermann scored two goals in two matches for the second season running in 2009, when he netted with headers against both Liverpool and Manchester City. In December 2009, he scored the first goal in a 2–0 victory against Burnley. On 27 March 2010, Hermann snapped his achilles tendon in an away match against Tottenham Hotspur and was ruled out for the rest of the season. After the match, Spurs and former Portsmouth manager Harry Redknapp commented, "The game was soured by Hermann's injury. The lads said they heard it pop." Due to this injury, Hermann was unable to play in the 2010 FA Cup Final.

After Portsmouth were relegated from the Premier League, it became unknown whether Hermann would stay at the club. However, on 8 October, he signed a new one-year contract. For most of the 2010–11 season, Hermann remained on the bench, as manager Steve Cotterill preferred loan signing Carl Dickinson, but in the latter part of the season, he became first-choice ahead of Dickinson and made his 500th league appearance against Barnsley on 19 February 2011. He signed a new one-year contract with Portsmouth on 8 July.

=== Coventry City ===
On 14 January 2012, after a long injury spell and limited playing time, it was announced that Hermann would sign for fellow Championship side Coventry City on a six-month contract. He was injured after only two appearances and could not play for the rest of the season.

Hermann was released by Coventry when his contract ran out at the end of the 2011–12 season. Coincidentally, both Coventry City and Portsmouth were relegated from the Championship that season.

=== Portsmouth trial ===
On 4 September 2012, a rumour circulated that Hermann was to offer his services to Portsmouth and play for nothing. The following day, the rumour was confirmed by local newspaper The News. In an online article, manager Michael Appleton stated "Hermann will come in and train with us towards the end of the week and we will see where he is from a fitness point of view. He tells me he wants to play for nothing but we will assess him. I am certainly not ruling it out. We will see how his fitness is, like we would do with any triallist". Hermann intended to play in an upcoming League One match against Crawley Town, but due to his appointment as manager of his hometown club ÍBV, he did not play.

== International career ==
Hermann made his debut for Iceland in a June 1996 friendly match against Cyprus, coming on as a substitute for Alexander Högnason. He since become a strongly established member of the team, collecting 89 caps and captaining the side in his later years.

== Managerial career ==
Hermann reached an agreement with his hometown club ÍBV on 19 September 2012 to become their manager for the 2013 Úrvalsdeild season. He would later sign former English international goalkeeper and Portsmouth teammate David James for the 2013 season. He then spent three years at Fylkir, managing the men's team during the 2015 and 2016 seasons, and the women's team during the 2017 season. In January 2018, he teamed up once again with David James at Kerala Blasters in the Indian Super League as assistant manager, after James' appointment as manager.

On 22 October 2019, he was appointed assistant to Sol Campbell at Southend United of English League One. Following the club's relegation, on 30 June 2020, manager Campbell and his three assistants left the club by mutual consent.

== Personal life ==
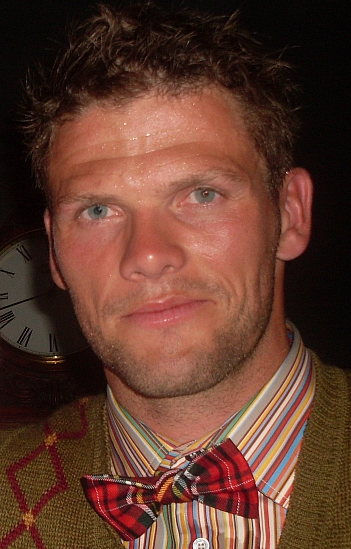
Hermann in 2009

Hermann has four children, two boys with his current fiancée Alexandra Fanney Jóhannsdóttir, and two girls, footballers Ída Marín and Thelma Lóa, from his previous marriage to Ragna Lóa Stefánsdóttir.

== Career statistics ==
=== Club ===
Appearances and goals by club, season and competition
Club	Season	League			National cup		League cup		Other		Europe		Total	
Club	Season	Division	Apps	Goals	Apps	Goals	Apps	Goals	Apps	Goals	Apps	Goals	Apps	Goals
ÍBV	1993	Úrvalsdeild	2	0	0	0	—		—		—		2	0
ÍBV	1994	Úrvalsdeild	18	2	3	1	—		—		—		21	3
ÍBV	1995	Úrvalsdeild	18	1	1	0	—		—		—		19	1
ÍBV	1996	Úrvalsdeild	17	2	5	0	?	?	1 (Note: Appearance in Icelandic Super Cup)	0	2	0	25	2
ÍBV	1997	Úrvalsdeild	11	0	3	1	?	?	—		0	0	14	1
ÍBV	Total		66	5	12	2	0	0	1	0	2	0	81	7
Crystal Palace	1997–98	Premier League	30	2	4	0	2	0	0	0	0	0	36	2
Crystal Palace	1998–99	First Division	7	0	0	0	3	1	0	0	0	0	10	1
Crystal Palace	Total		37	2	4	0	5	1	0	0	0	0	46	3
Brentford	1998–99	Third Division	33	4	2	1	0	0	3	1	0	0	38	6
Brentford	1999–2000	Second Division	8	2	0	0	2	0	0	0	0	0	10	2
Brentford	Total		41	6	2	1	2	0	3	1	0	0	48	8
Wimbledon	1999–2000	Premier League	24	1	2	0	0	0	0	0	0	0	26	1
Wimbledon	2000–01	First Division	1	0	0	0	0	0	0	0	0	0	1	0
Wimbledon	Total		25	1	2	0	0	0	0	0	0	0	27	1
Ipswich Town	2000–01	Premier League	36	1	2	0	7	0	0	0	0	0	45	1
Ipswich Town	2001–02	Premier League	38	1	2	0	1	0	0	0	6	1	47	2
Ipswich Town	2002–03	First Division	28	0	2	0	3	0	0	0	3	0	36	0
Ipswich Town	Total		102	2	6	0	11	0	0	0	9	1	128	3
Charlton Athletic	2003–04	Premier League	33	2	1	0	1	0	0	0	0	0	35	2
Charlton Athletic	2004–05	Premier League	34	1	3	0	2	1	0	0	0	0	39	2
Charlton Athletic	2005–06	Premier League	34	0	5	0	3	0	0	0	0	0	42	0
Charlton Athletic	2006–07	Premier League	31	0	0	0	2	0	0	0	0	0	33	0
Charlton Athletic	Total		132	3	9	0	8	1	0	0	0	0	149	4
Portsmouth	2007–08	Premier League	32	3	6	0	1	0	0	0	0	0	39	3
Portsmouth	2008–09	Premier League	23	2	2	0	1	0	1 (Note: Appearance in FA Community Shield)	0	3	1	30	3
Portsmouth	2009–10	Premier League	17	1	5	0	1	0	0	0	0	0	23	1
Portsmouth	2010–11	Championship	28	1	1	0	0	0	0	0	0	0	29	1
Portsmouth	2011–12	Championship	2	0	0	0	0	0	0	0	0	0	2	0
Portsmouth	Total		102	7	14	0	3	0	1	0	3	1	122	8
Coventry City	2011–12	Championship	2	0	0	0	0	0	0	0	0	0	2	0
ÍBV	2013	Úrvalsdeild	4	0	0	0	0	0	—		3	0	7	0
Fylkir	2014	Úrvalsdeild	0	0	0	0	0	0	—		0	0	0	0
Career total			513	26	49	3	29	2	5	1	17	2	610	34

=== International ===
Appearances and goals by national team and year
National team	Year	Apps	Goals
Iceland	1996	3	0
Iceland	1997	6	0
Iceland	1998	8	0
Iceland	1999	10	1
Iceland	2000	7	0
Iceland	2001	7	1
Iceland	2002	5	0
Iceland	2003	6	1
Iceland	2004	8	0
Iceland	2005	4	1
Iceland	2006	6	1
Iceland	2007	5	0
Iceland	2008	7	0
Iceland	2009	3	0
Iceland	2010	1	0
Iceland	2011	3	0
Total		89	5

Scores and results list Iceland's goal tally first, score column indicates score after each Hermann goal.

List of international goals scored by Hermann Hreiðarsson
No.	Date	Venue	Opponent	Score	Result	Competition
1	4 September 1999	Laugardalsvöllur, Iceland	Andorra	2–0	3–0	UEFA Euro 2000 qualifying
2	24 March 2001	Sofia, Bulgaria	Bulgaria	1–0	1–2	FIFA World Cup 2002 Qualifying
3	11 June 2003	Kaunas, Lithuania	Lithuania	2–0	3–0	UEFA Euro 2004 qualifying
4	7 September 2005	Sofia, Bulgaria	Bulgaria	2–0	3–2	FIFA World Cup 2006 Qualifying
5	2 September 2006	Belfast, Northern Ireland	Northern Ireland	2–0	3–0	UEFA Euro 2008 qualifying

== Honours ==
ÍBV

- Úrvalsdeild: 1997

Brentford

- Football League Third Division: 1998–99

Portsmouth

- FA Cup: 2007–08

Individual

- Icelandic Footballer of the Year: 1997, 2000, 2007
- PFA Team of the Year: 1998–99 Third Division
- Ipswich Town Hall of Fame: Inducted 2019
