= Darren Freeman =

English footballer and football manager

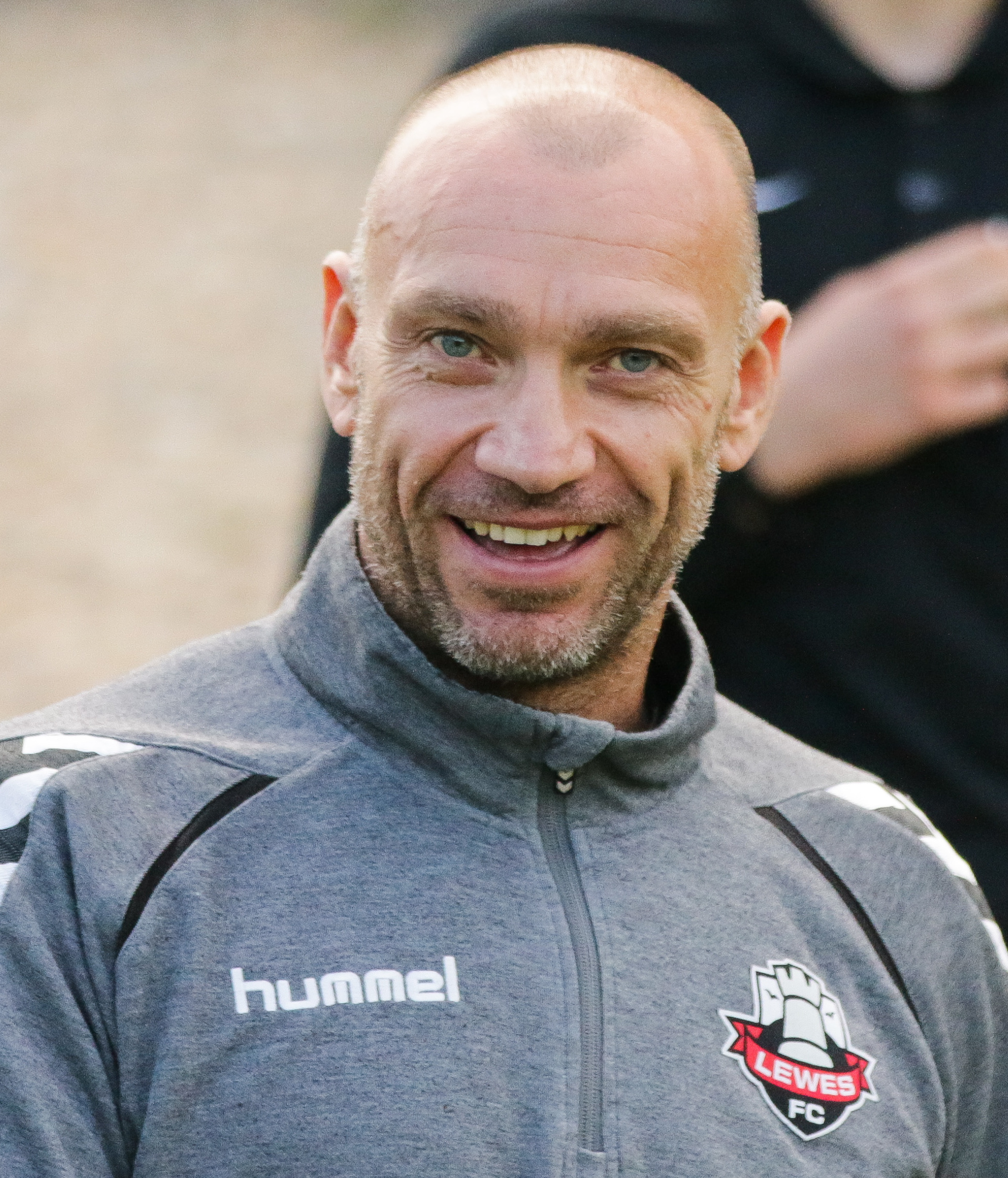
- Freeman in 2017

Personal information
- Full name: Darren Barry Andduet Freeman
- Date of birth: 22 August 1973 (age 53)
- Place of birth: Brighton, England
- Positions: Winger; striker

Youth career
- 1988–1990: Whitehawk

Senior career*
Years	Team	Apps	(Gls)
1990–1992	Whitehawk		
1992–1993	Worthing		
1993	Littlehampton Town		
1994–1995	Horsham		
1995–1996	Gillingham	12	(0)
1995–1996	→ Glenavon (loan)		
1996–1998	Fulham	46	(9)
1998–1999	Brentford	22	(6)
1999–2001	Brighton & Hove Albion	54	(12)
2002–2003	Margate		
2003–2004	Worthing		
2004	Three Bridges		
2005–2013	Whitehawk		
Total		134	(27)

Managerial career
- 2009–2014: Whitehawk
- 2015: Peacehaven & Telscombe
- 2015–2019: Lewes
- * Club domestic league appearances and goals

Darren Barry Andduet Freeman (born 22 August 1973) is an English football manager and former professional player who played as a winger and striker, making over 130 appearances in the Football League between 1995 and 2001.

== Playing career ==
Born in Brighton, Freeman played youth football for Whitehawk and Sussex County Youth, making his first team debut at the age of 16. He scored the winner as a 17 year old in the RUR Cup Final against Peacehaven & Telscombe in March 1991 while also appearing in the County Youth Cup Final later in the season, earning trials at Portsmouth, Southend United and Maidstone United. After playing for Isthmian League Worthing and Horsham he was signed by Gillingham. Following a successful loan spell at Glenavon, he went on to play in the Football League with Fulham, Brentford and Brighton & Hove Albion, making a total of 134 appearances. He retired from professional football in August 2001 due to an ongoing hernia problem.

He will always be remembered for two feats with the Seagulls – scoring a hat-trick in Albion's first ever competitive match at Withdean Stadium, when they beat Mansfield Town 6–0, and scoring the first English football league goal of the new millennium when he netted in an early kick-off against Exeter City on January 3, 2000.

He returned to non-league football in June 2002 with Margate, Worthing and Three Bridges, the latter as player-coach, before ending his playing career back at his first club Whitehawk, joining in 2005–06, before taking on a player-coaching role in 2008. Freeman made 16 league and cup appearances in the 2007–08 season and a further 12 league and cup appearances in the 2009–10 season. His final ever appearance was from the bench in a Sussex Senior Challenge Cup tie at Horsham on 26 November 2013.

== Coaching career ==
Freeman was appointed sole manager of Whitehawk in May 2010, having previously been joint-manager of the club alongside George Parris since May 2009. Despite taking the club from the Sussex County League to the Conference South League with three promotions in four years, he was sacked by Whitehawk in January 2014.

Freeman was appointed manager of Isthmian League Division One South side Peacehaven & Telscombe in August 2015 but left after just two months to take up the manager's position at nearby Lewes. On 2 April 2016, Lewes were relegated from the Isthmian Premier League to the Isthmian Division One South with three games of the season remaining. On 13 April 2018, the Rooks won promotion back to the Isthmian Premier League, eventually finishing the 2017-18 Isthmian Division One South season in 2nd place, behind Carshalton Athletic, on 99 points. Freeman left Lewes in October 2019 to take up a full-time role with the SportsTotal agency with his former teammate at Brentford, Dirk Hebel. Hebel named his son Darren after Freeman.

== Personal life ==
Freeman was educated at Varndean School in Brighton and has two sons, Leighton and Stacey with his partner Lorraine. Stacey Freeman played in his father's team at Lewes. His father Reg died in August 2009 and was cited as an inspiration to Freeman's career. As a player, Freeman was notable for his long hair, modelled on Braveheart's Mel Gibson.

== Honours ==
Brentford

- Football League Third Division: 1998–99

Brighton & Hove Albion

- Football League Third Division: 2000–01
