= Tony Folan =

Footballer (born 1978)

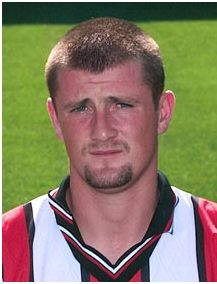
- Folan with Brentford

Personal information
- Full name: Anthony Stephen Folan
- Date of birth: 18 September 1978 (age 48)
- Place of birth: Lewisham, England
- Height: 1.78 m (5 ft 10 in)
- Position: Midfielder

Youth career
- Galway Hibernians
- 1994–1997: Crystal Palace

Senior career*
| Years | Team | Apps | (Gls) |
| 1997–1998 | Crystal Palace | 1 | (0) |
| 1998–2001 | Brentford | 68 | (9) |
| 2001–2002 | Bohemians | | |
| 2002–2004 | Galway United | | |
- Galway Hibernians

International career
| 1996–1997 | Republic of Ireland U18 | 3 | (0) |
| 1997–1999 | Republic of Ireland U21 | 6 | (0) |
- * Club domestic league appearances and goals

Anthony Stephen Folan (born 18 September 1978) is a former professional footballer who played as a midfielder for Brentford and Crystal Palace. Born in England, he represented Republic of Ireland at age-group level.

== Club career ==
=== Crystal Palace ===
Folan was born in Lewisham, England. Growing up in Galway, he was a classmate of Colin Hawkins at St. Joseph's Patrician College and played youth football at Galway Hibernians. At the age of 14, he signed schoolboy terms at Crystal Palace. He made steady progress through the ranks at the club, signing a professional contract in 1995 and appearing in the 1997 FA Youth Cup final against Leeds United. With Palace's relegation from the Premiership already confirmed, Folan made his first team debut in the final match of the 1997–98 season against Sheffield Wednesday, when he replaced Saša Ćurčić after 75 minutes. Early in the 1998–99 season, he started in the first leg of Palace's Intertoto Cup third round match against Samsunspor, but was replaced by Simon Rodger after 63 minutes. Folan subsequently injured his groin and was out for six weeks after undergoing surgery. He turned down the offer of a contract extension from new manager Terry Venables and departed Selhurst Park in September 1998.

=== Brentford ===
Folan dropped down two divisions to sign for Third Division club Brentford for a £110,000 fee on 22 September 1998. He enjoyed a solid first season, making 35 appearances, scoring six goals and being awarded a Third Division winner's medal as Brentford dramatically beat Cambridge United on the last day of the 1998–99 season. A broken foot kept Folan out for six months of the 1999–00 season and he only made 12 appearances. He managed 23 appearances and two goals during the 2000–01 season, but missed four months of the season after being forced to undergo a cartilage operation in December 2000. On 23 October 2001, Folan was made available for transfer and was released on 4 November, after failing to make an appearance during the early months of the 2001–02 season. He scored 9 goals in 70 appearances in just over three years at Griffin Park.

=== Bohemians ===
In November 2001, Folan returned to Ireland and signed for League of Ireland Premier Division club Bohemians. He made his debut for Bohemian in a televised Dublin derby against Shamrock Rovers on 9 November, but he ended up on the losing side as Rovers won 1–0. Within weeks, manager Pete Mahon was sacked and Folan found appearances limited. He scored in a 4–1 rout of Longford Town in the second round of the League of Ireland Cup, as Bohemian progressed to the semi-finals before being knocked out by Derry City.

=== Return to Galway ===
Folan joined hometown club Galway United during the 2002 off-season and helped the club into the League of Ireland First Division play-off final in the 2002–03 season, which ended in defeat to Premier Division side Drogheda United. In August 2004, Folan departed the club to join Galway & District League club Galway Hibernians, where he began his career. He won the title with he club during the 2005–06 season.

== International career ==
Folan appeared for the Republic Of Ireland at the 1997 UEFA European U18 Championship in Iceland, eventually losing the third place playoff to Spain. He won six U21 caps as Republic Of Ireland failed to qualify for the 2000 UEFA European U21 Championship.

== Personal life ==
Folan is the older brother of footballer Stephen Folan.

== Career statistics ==
Appearances and goals by club, season and competition
| Club | Season | League | | | FA Cup | | League Cup | | Europe | | Other | | Total | |
| Club | Season | Division | Apps | Goals | Apps | Goals | Apps | Goals | Apps | Goals | Apps | Goals | Apps | Goals |
|---|---|---|---|---|---|---|---|---|---|---|---|---|---|---|
| Crystal Palace | 1997–98 | Premier League | 1 | 0 | 0 | 0 | 0 | 0 | — | | — | | 1 | 0 |
| Crystal Palace | 1998–99 | First Division | 0 | 0 | — | | 0 | 0 | 1 (Note: Appearance in Intertoto Cup) | 0 | — | | 1 | 0 |
| Crystal Palace | Total | | 1 | 0 | 0 | 0 | 0 | 0 | 1 | 0 | — | | 2 | 0 |
| Brentford | 1998–99 | Third Division | 30 | 4 | 3 | 2 | 1 | 0 | — | | 1 (Note: Appearance in Football League Trophy) | 0 | 35 | 6 |
| Brentford | 1999–00 | Second Division | 9 | 1 | 1 | 0 | 2 | 0 | — | | 0 | 0 | 12 | 1 |
| Brentford | 2000–01 | Second Division | 21 | 2 | 0 | 0 | 2 | 0 | — | | 0 | 0 | 23 | 2 |
| Brentford | Total | | 60 | 7 | 4 | 2 | 5 | 0 | — | | 1 | 0 | 70 | 9 |
| Career total | | | 61 | 7 | 4 | 2 | 5 | 0 | 1 | 0 | 2 | 0 | 72 | 9 |

== Honours ==
Brentford

- Football League Third Division: 1998–99
- Football League Trophy runner-up: 2000–01

Galway Hibernians

- Galway & District League: 2005–06
