= Danny Boxall =

English footballer

Personal information
- Full name: Daniel James Boxall
- Date of birth: 24 August 1977 (age 49)
- Place of birth: Croydon, England
- Height: 5 ft 11 in (1.80 m)
- Position: Right back

Youth career
- –1987: Selsdon Junior
- 1987–1991: Tottenham Hotspur
- 1991–1995: Crystal Palace

Senior career*
Years	Team	Apps	(Gls)
1995–1998	Crystal Palace	8	(0)
1997	→ Oldham Athletic (loan)	5	(0)
1998	→ Oldham Athletic (loan)	12	(0)
1998–2002	Brentford	68	(1)
2002–2004	Bristol Rovers	63	(0)
2004–2005	Dublin City		
2006	Carshalton Athletic	6	(0)
2006–2008	Whyteleafe	48	(0)
2008	Hampton & Richmond Borough	1	(0)
2008	Croydon Athletic	16	(0)

International career
1998–1999	Republic of Ireland U21	8	(0)
- * Club domestic league appearances and goals

Daniel James Boxall (born 24 August 1977) is an English former professional footballer who played as a right back for Brentford, Bristol Rovers, Oldham Athletic and Crystal Palace. After two seasons in Ireland with Dublin City, he returned to England in 2006 to play non-League football and retired in 2008.

== Club career ==
A right back, Boxall began his senior career at First Division club Crystal Palace and made 8 appearances during the 1995–96 and 1996–97 seasons. He made two appearances during Palace's single-season stay in the Premier League and spent most of 1997–98 on loan at Second Division club Oldham Athletic. Having been hampered by an anterior cruciate ligament injury suffered during his time at Selhurst Park, Boxall was released by Crystal Palace in June 1998 and joined newly-relegated Third Division club Brentford on a free transfer. He made 46 appearances and scored one goal during the Bees' Third Division-title winning 1998–99 season.

A second anterior cruciate ligament injury suffered in February 2000 kept Boxall out of match play until March 2002 and he made a number of late-2001–02 season appearances. He was released after Brentford's Second Division play-off final defeat and played the 2002–03 and 2003–04 seasons with Third Division club Bristol Rovers. After putting off a decision to retire, Boxall played his subsequent career in the League of Ireland and English non-League football, before retiring due to injury in 2008.

== International career ==
Owing to an Irish grandmother from Wexford, Boxall qualified to represent the Republic of Ireland at international level and he won eight U21 caps in 1998 and 1999.

== Personal life ==
Boxall was born at Mayday Hospital and attended Holy Trinity Church of England Junior School and Stanley Park High School in Wallington. He has four older brothers and an older sister. Boxall has worked as a male model and has run cleaning, construction and physiotherapy businesses. As of 2020, he was director of cleaning and property business Adept London.

== Trivia ==
Boxall was hired as a body double for Kuno Becker's legs in close-up dribbling sequences in the 2005 film Goal!.

== Career statistics ==
Appearances and goals by club, season and competition
Club	Season	League			National cup		League cup		Other		Total	
Club	Season	Division	Apps	Goals	Apps	Goals	Apps	Goals	Apps	Goals	Apps	Goals
Crystal Palace	1995–96	First Division	1	0	0	0	0	0	0	0	1	0
Crystal Palace	1996–97	First Division	6	0	0	0	1	0	0	0	7	0
Crystal Palace	1997–98	Premier League	1	0	—		1	0	—		2	0
Crystal Palace	Total		8	0	0	0	2	0	0	0	10	0
Oldham Athletic (loan)	1997–98	Second Division	17	0	0	0	—		1 (Note: Appearances in Football League Trophy)	0	18	0
Brentford	1998–99	Third Division	38	1	2	0	4	0	2	0	46	1
Brentford	1999–00	Second Division	25	0	2	0	2	0	3	0	32	0
Brentford	2001–02	Second Division	5	0	0	0	0	0	1 (Note: Appearance in Second Division play-offs)	0	6	0
Brentford	Total		68	1	4	0	6	0	6	0	84	1
Bristol Rovers	2002–03	Third Division	39	0	4	0	1	0	1	0	45	0
Bristol Rovers	2003–04	Third Division	24	0	0	0	1	0	1	0	26	0
Bristol Rovers	Total		63	0	4	0	2	0	2	0	71	0
Carshalton Athletic	2005–06	Conference South	5	0	—		—		—		5	0
Carshalton Athletic	2006–07	Isthmian League Premier Division	6	0	0	0	—		0	0	6	0
Carshalton Athletic	Total		11	0	0	0	—		0	0	11	0
Whyteleafe	2006–07	Isthmian League First Division South	18	0	—		—		0	0	18	0
Whyteleafe	2007–08	Isthmian League First Division South	30	0	0	0	—		2 (Note: Appearances in Isthmian League Cup)	0	32	0
Whyteleafe	Total		48	0	0	0	—		2	0	50	0
Hampton & Richmond Borough	2008–09	Conference South	1	0	—		—		—		1	0
Croydon Athletic	2008–09	Isthmian League First Division South	16	0	0	0	—		0	0	16	0
Career total			232	1	8	0	8	0	10	0	258	1

== Honours ==
Brentford

- Football League Third Division: 1998–99
