= Simon Rodger =

English footballer

Personal information
- Full name: Simon Lee Rodger
- Date of birth: 3 October 1971 (age 55)
- Place of birth: Shoreham-by-Sea, England
- Position: Midfielder

Youth career
- Bognor Regis Town

Senior career*
Years	Team	Apps	(Gls)
1989–1990	Bognor Regis Town		
1990–2002	Crystal Palace	276	(11)
1996	→ Manchester City (loan)	8	(1)
1997	→ Stoke City (loan)	5	(0)
2002	Woking	1	(0)
2002–2004	Brighton & Hove Albion	36	(2)
Total		326	(14)
- * Club domestic league appearances and goals

Simon Lee Rodger (born 3 October 1971) is an English former professional footballer who played as a defensive midfielder from 1989 until 2004.

He played the majority of his career with Crystal Palace, including a number of seasons in the Premier League. He also played in the Football League for Manchester City, Stoke City and Brighton & Hove Albion, and in non-League football for Bognor Regis Town and Woking.

== Club career ==
Rodger was born in Shoreham-by-Sea and played non-league football with Bognor Regis Town before he was signed by Palace in 1990 for £1,000. He made his debut for the club, away at Sheffield Wednesday, at the age of 20 and soon established himself as a vital member of the first team at Selhurst Park. He spent 11 seasons with Palace in what was a decade of instability at the club. They were founding members of the Premier League but were relegated back to Division One in 1992–93. They gained an instant return in 1993–94 which was followed again by relegation in 1994–95.

Promotion was again achieved in 1996–97 through the play-offs, but Rodger spent time out on loan that season at Manchester City (making eight appearances) and Stoke City (making five appearances). Palace then suffered a third relegation from the top-tier in 1997–98. Palace remained in Division One and with Rodger having spent ten years at the club he was given a testimonial against Tottenham Hotspur. In 2002, after his testimonial, Rodger was released by the club and after a short time with Woking, was signed by Brighton and Hove Albion, where he was reunited with former Palace manager Steve Coppell. He finished his League career with Brighton.

== Personal life ==
Rodger is currently not married, but has been married twice

== Career statistics ==
Appearances and goals by club, season and competition
Club	Season	League			FA Cup		League Cup		Other^{[A]}		Total	
Club	Season	Division	Apps	Goals	Apps	Goals	Apps	Goals	Apps	Goals	Apps	Goals
Crystal Palace	1991–92	First Division	22	0	1	0	6	0	1	0	30	0
Crystal Palace	1992–93	Premier League	23	2	1	0	4	0	0	0	28	2
Crystal Palace	1993–94	First Division	42	3	1	0	4	0	2	0	49	3
Crystal Palace	1994–95	Premier League	4	0	0	0	0	0	0	0	4	0
Crystal Palace	1995–96	First Division	24	0	2	0	1	0	1	0	28	0
Crystal Palace	1996–97	First Division	11	0	0	0	0	0	3	0	14	0
Crystal Palace	1997–98	Premier League	29	2	3	0	1	0	0	0	33	2
Crystal Palace	1998–99	First Division	18	1	1	0	2	0	1	0	22	1
Crystal Palace	1999–2000	First Division	34	2	1	0	4	1	0	0	39	3
Crystal Palace	2000–01	First Division	33	0	2	0	6	0	0	0	41	0
Crystal Palace	2001–02	First Division	36	1	1	0	3	1	0	0	40	2
Crystal Palace	Total		276	11	13	0	31	2	8	0	328	13
Manchester City (loan)	1996–97	First Division	8	1	0	0	0	0	0	0	8	1
Stoke City (loan)	1996–97	First Division	5	0	0	0	0	0	0	0	5	0
Woking	2002–03	Football Conference	1	0	0	0	0	0	0	0	1	0
Brighton & Hove Albion	2002–03	First Division	29	2	0	0	0	0	0	0	29	2
Brighton & Hove Albion	2003–04	Second Division	7	0	0	0	2	0	0	0	9	0
Brighton & Hove Albion	total		36	2	0	0	2	0	0	0	38	2
Career Total			326	14	13	0	33	2	8	0	379	16

A. The "Other" column constitutes appearances and goals in the Anglo-Italian Cup, Football League play-offs, Full Members' Cup, Football League Trophy and UEFA Intertoto Cup.

== Honours ==
Crystal Palace

- Football League First Division: 1993–94; play-offs: 1997
