= Mohamed Berthé =

Guinean footballer (born 1972)

Personal information
- Full name: Mohamed Berthé
- Date of birth: September 12, 1972 (age 54)
- Place of birth: Balato, Guinea
- Height: 1.88 m (6 ft 2 in)
- Position: Defender

Senior career*
Years	Team	Apps	(Gls)
1990–1992	Paris Saint-Germain II		
1994–1996	Olympique Noisy-le-Sec	44	(1)
1996–1997	Gazélec Ajaccio	28	(2)
1998	West Ham United	0	(0)
1998–1999	Bournemouth	15	(2)
1999	→ Heart of Midlothian (loan)	1	(0)
1999–2000	Raith Rovers	1	(0)
2000	Stade Tamponnaise		
2001–2002	K.F.C. Strombeek	25	(11)
2002–2003	Cercle Brugge	35	(9)
2004	Zulte Waregem	5	(2)
2005–2006	Tienen	8	(2)
2006–2007	Dilbeek Sport	15	(2)
- * Club domestic league appearances and goals

Mohamed Berthé (born September 12, 1972) is a retired Guinean professional football player.
