= Rory Ginty =

Irish footballer

Personal information
- Full name: Rory Vincent Ginty
- Date of birth: 23 January 1977 (age 49)
- Place of birth: Galway, Ireland
- Position: Winger

Youth career
- Salthill Devon
- 1994–1995: Crystal Palace

Senior career*
Years	Team	Apps	(Gls)
1994–1998	Crystal Palace	5	(0)
1998	Shelbourne	2	(0)
1998	Coleraine	?	(?)
1999	Ards	12	(1)
1999–2000	Kilkenny City	?	(?)
- * Club domestic league appearances and goals

Rory Ginty (born 23 January 1977) is an Irish former footballer who played as a winger.

== Career ==
Born in Galway, Ginty started out playing for local side Salthill Devon, where he was noticed by Crystal Palace scouts playing at a tournament in Wales in 1991. He linked up with Crystal Palace during school holidays thereafter before eventually signing as a 17 year old in 1994. He signed professional terms in 1997 and made his Premier League debut as a substitute against Liverpool on 13 December 1997. After four more League appearances for Palace he returned home to sign a one-month contract with Shelbourne in August 1998.

He made his League of Ireland debut on 6 September.

In September 1998, he again initially signed a one-month deal with Coleraine making his Irish Football League debut at Omagh Town on 19 September. This deal was extended until the end of 1998.

He joined Ards in January 1999 until the end of the season where he scored three goals in a total of 17 appearances.

He moved back to the League of Ireland for the 1999–2000 League of Ireland season with Kilkenny City who he helped get promoted through the playoffs.

Ginty now works for Aviva Group Ireland.
