= Tony Scully =

Irish footballer and coach (born 1976)

Personal information
- Full name: Anthony Derek Thomas Scully
- Date of birth: 12 June 1976 (age 50)
- Place of birth: Dublin, Ireland
- Position: Winger

Youth career
- 1984–1993: Cherry Orchard

Senior career*
Years	Team	Apps	(Gls)
1993–1997	Crystal Palace	3	(0)
1994	→ AFC Bournemouth (loan)	10	(0)
1996	→ Cardiff City (loan)	14	(0)
1997–1998	Manchester City	9	(0)
1998	→ Stoke City (loan)	7	(0)
1998–2001	Queens Park Rangers	40	(2)
2001–2003	Cambridge United	31	(2)
2002–2003	→ Southend United (loan)	8	(0)
2003	→ Peterborough United (loan)	3	(0)
2003	Peterborough United	0	(0)
2003	Dagenham & Redbridge	13	(0)
2003–2004	Barnet	1	(0)
2004	→ Tamworth (loan)	1	(1)
2004–2006	Notts County	41	(5)
2005	→ Exeter City (loan)	13	(3)
2005–2006	→ Crawley Town (loan)	6	(0)
2006–2007	Crawley Town	57	(9)
Total		257	(22)

International career
- Ireland U21
- Ireland B
- * Club domestic league appearances and goals as of 22:34, 14 December 2007 (UTC)

Anthony Derek Thomas Scully (born 12 June 1976 in Dublin) is an Irish former professional footballer and coach who started his career with Crystal Palace.

== Career ==
While at Palace Scully went on loan to AFC Bournemouth and Cardiff City before joining Manchester City in 1997. He was loaned out to league rivals Stoke City in 1998 where he played seven games for The Potters before he returned to Manchester City. He left for Queens Park Rangers in March 1998 for a fee of £155,000. He spent three years at Loftus Road, and joined Cambridge United after. Scully then went on to spend short periods of time at Dagenham & Redbridge (where he scored twice in the Football League Trophy against Leyton Orient and former club QPR), Barnet, Tamworth (where he scored on his only appearance for the club against Leigh RMI), Notts County and Exeter before finishing his career at Crawley Town due to a persistent knee injury.

== Career statistics ==
Appearances and goals by club, season and competition
Club	Season	League			FA Cup		League Cup		Other		Total	
Club	Season	Division	Apps	Goals	Apps	Goals	Apps	Goals	Apps	Goals	Apps	Goals
Crystal Palace	1995–96	First Division	2	0	0	0	0	0	0	0	2	0
Crystal Palace	1996–97	First Division	1	0	0	0	0	0	0	0	1	0
AFC Bournemouth (loan)	1994–95	Second Division	10	0	0	0	0	0	2	0	12	0
Cardiff City (loan)	1995–96	Third Division	14	0	0	0	0	0	0	0	14	0
Manchester City	1997–98	First Division	9	0	0	0	0	0	0	0	9	0
Stoke City (loan)	1997–98	First Division	7	0	0	0	0	0	0	0	7	0
Queens Park Rangers	1997–98	First Division	7	0	0	0	0	0	0	0	7	0
Queens Park Rangers	1998–99	First Division	23	2	0	0	4	0	0	0	27	2
Queens Park Rangers	1999–2000	First Division	8	0	1	0	1	0	0	0	10	0
Queens Park Rangers	2000–01	First Division	2	0	0	0	0	0	0	0	2	0
Cambridge United	2001–02	Second Division	25	2	2	0	0	0	2	0	29	2
Cambridge United	2002–03	Third Division	6	0	0	0	1	0	1	0	8	0
Southend United (loan)	2002–03	Third Division	8	0	4	0	0	0	0	0	12	0
Peterborough United (loan)	2002–03	Second Division	2	0	0	0	0	0	0	0	2	0
Dagenham & Redbridge	2003–04	Conference National	13	0	0	0	0	0	2	2	15	2
Barnet	2003–04	Conference National	1	0	0	0	0	0	0	0	1	0
Tamworth	2003–04	Conference National	1	1	0	0	0	0	0	0	1	1
Notts County	2003–04	Second Division	10	3	0	0	0	0	0	0	10	3
Notts County	2004–05	League Two	21	2	4	1	2	0	1	0	28	3
Exeter City (loan)	2004–05	Conference National	13	3	0	0	0	0	0	0	13	3
Crawley Town	2004–05	Conference National	20	2	0	0	0	0	0	0	20	2
Crawley Town	2005–06	Conference National	40	7	0	0	0	0	0	0	40	7
Crawley Town	2006–07	Conference National	0	0	0	0	0	0	0	0	0	0
Crawley Town	2007–08	Conference National	3	0	0	0	0	0	0	0	3	0
Career Total			246	22	11	1	8	0	8	2	273	25
