= Rob Quinn =

English footballer

Personal information
- Full name: Robert John Quinn
- Date of birth: 8 November 1976 (age 49)
- Place of birth: Sidcup, England
- Position: Midfielder

Youth career
- 1991–1995: Crystal Palace

Senior career*
Years	Team	Apps	(Gls)
1995–1998	Crystal Palace	28	(2)
1998–2001	Brentford	125	(4)
2001–2002	Oxford United	29	(2)
2002–2004	Bristol Rovers	86	(3)
2004–2006	Stevenage Borough	62	(1)
2006–2007	Gravesend & Northfleet	28	(0)
2007–2008	AFC Wimbledon	47	(3)
2008–2009	Welling United	42	(1)
2009–2010	Cray Wanderers	37	(1)
2010–2011	Sevenoaks		
Total		484	(17)

International career
1997	Republic of Ireland U21	5	(0)
1997	Republic of Ireland B	1	(0)
- * Club domestic league appearances and goals

Robert John Quinn (born 8 November 1976) is a former professional footballer, and current youth team coach. He played as midfielder, predominantly in the centre, but also played at centre back. He represented the Republic of Ireland under-21s and Republic of Ireland B team.

== Career ==
=== Crystal Palace ===
Quinn began his career at Crystal Palace, where he came through their youth ranks. Whilst he was learning his trade in the Palace youth team, he was made captain and led the team every week to win the Southeast Counties League. His hard work at youth level was recognised by Crystal Palace's manager Dave Bassett, who promoted Quinn to the first team squad. He made his debut, along with youth teammate Danny Boxall, in the last league game of the season in 1996, at home against Norwich City.

Palace made the playoffs and, due to injuries in the first team, Quinn was in the starting lineup to face Charlton Athletic in the semi-final, which Crystal Palace won.

Palace were through to the playoff final at Wembley, and due to players still being injured list Quinn was picked to start against Leicester City. Palace lost and were forced to carry on in the First Division for the 1996–97 season, where Quinn was a regular in the team, making 24 appearances and scoring two goals. Later on that season, Bassett left and Steve Coppell was brought in, with Quinn falling down the pecking order. Quinn made his first and only appearance in the Premier League on 27 September 1997 in a home match against Bolton, coming on as a substitute after 72 minutes for Kevin Muscat.

=== Later career ===
After spells with Brentford, Oxford United, Bristol Rovers and several non-league clubs (most recently AFC Wimbledon and Welling United) he signed with Cray Wanderers for their inaugural season in the Isthmian Premier League for 2009–10. Quinn joined Kent League side Sevenoaks as a player-coach for the 2010–11 season.

== Coaching career ==
As of October 2025, Quinn is a PDP Coach at Wycombe Wanderers

== Honours ==
Brentford

- Football League Third Division: 1998–99
