= Andy Cyrus =

English footballer

Personal information
- Date of birth: 30 September 1976 (age 50)
- Place of birth: Lambeth, England
- Position: Left back

Senior career*
Years	Team	Apps	(Gls)
1994–1997	Crystal Palace	1	(0)
1997–1998	Exeter City	21	(0)
1998–1999	Dulwich Hamlet	?	(?)
2002–2003	Hampton & Richmond Borough	10	(1)
2003–2004	St. Leonards Stamcroft	?	(?)
2004–2005	Carshalton Athletic	4	(0)
- * Club domestic league appearances and goals

Andrew Daryl Cyrus (born 30 September 1976, in Lambeth) is an English former professional footballer who played in the Football League as a left back.
