= Leon McKenzie =

English footballer (born 1978)

Personal information
- Full name: Leon Mark McKenzie
- Date of birth: 17 May 1978 (age 48)
- Place of birth: Croydon, London, England
- Position: Forward

Youth career
- Crystal Palace

Senior career*
Years	Team	Apps	(Gls)
1995–2000	Crystal Palace	85	(7)
1997	→ Fulham (loan)	3	(0)
1998	→ Peterborough United (loan)	14	(8)
2000–2003	Peterborough United	90	(46)
2003–2006	Norwich City	79	(20)
2006–2009	Coventry City	62	(12)
2009–2010	Charlton Athletic	12	(0)
2010–2011	Northampton Town	27	(10)
2011	Kettering Town	9	(2)
2012–2013	Corby Town	12	(3)
Total		393	(115)
- * Club domestic league appearances and goals

Leon McKenzie
Personal information
- Nicknames: Big McK, Legacy, The Secret
- Weight: Super-middleweight

Boxing career
- Stance: Southpaw

Boxing record
- Total fights: 11
- Wins: 8
- Win by KO: 4
- Losses: 2
- Draws: 1
- No contests: 0

Leon Mark McKenzie (born 17 May 1978) is an English former professional footballer who played as a forward from 1995 to 2013. He scored in all four English professional leagues during his career. He was also a professional boxer, competing in the super middleweight class.

McKenzie started his professional career with Crystal Palace in 1995. He also appeared for Fulham and Peterborough United on loan whilst with The Eagles before securing a permanent move to Peterborough in 2000. Three years later he joined Norwich City and was a part of the side which won promotion to the Premier League. He went on to play for Coventry City, Charlton Athletic and Northampton Town before dropping into non-league football with Kettering Town and Corby Town. He retired from competitive football on 1 January 2013. Following his football career, he went on to become a professional boxer. He is a former International masters champion. English and Southern area challenger. He retired in 2017.

== Football career ==
McKenzie began his career with his local club Crystal Palace, making his debut during the 1995–96 season. In 1997, he was loaned to Fulham and in 1998 to Peterborough United, where he scored 9 goals in 15 games.

In 2000 McKenzie joined Peterborough on a permanent basis for a fee of £25,000. In three years at London Road he scored 49 goals in 103 games.

He joined Norwich from Peterborough in December 2003 for a fee of £325,000, and instantly won over the Canaries supporters by scoring twice on his debut to help beat local rivals Ipswich Town at Portman Road and go top of the First Division. His goals made a significant contribution to Norwich's promotion to the Premier League as First Division champions at the end of the 2003–04 season. Within a year, he had turned from a Second Division to a Premiership player. McKenzie took time to find his feet in the Premiership but he established a strike partnership with Dean Ashton which would become one of the most potent in the division during the closing stages of the 2004–05 season. His goals helped Norwich to haul themselves into contention to avoid the drop, although they were relegated on the last day of the season.

He came third in the Norwich City Supporters Player of The Season vote for the 2004–05, beaten by Darren Huckerby and Damien Francis. The 2005–06 season for McKenzie was interrupted by injuries and personal difficulties surrounding the break-up of his marriage. At the start of the 2006–07 campaign, he handed in a transfer request to manager Nigel Worthington. Although Worthington rejected McKenzie's request, he subsequently confirmed that McKenzie would be sold if they received an offer that matched the club's valuation of the player.

McKenzie was signed by Coventry City on transfer deadline day in August 2006 for an initial £600,000 that, depending on appearances and promotion, could rise to £1m. Coventry's first match after signing McKenzie was against Norwich – however, McKenzie was unable to play due to a condition of the transfer that prevented him from playing in either of the two fixtures between Coventry and Norwich in the 2006–07 season. He made his debut for Coventry on 12 September 2006 as a substitute against Ipswich Town at Portman Road. He started the 2007–08 season well, scoring against Barnsley on the opening day of the season and against Hull, before a knee injury put him out of action for several weeks. He scored in Coventry's opening game of the 2008–09 season against his old club, Norwich City. This marked McKenzie's 100th professional career goal and he celebrated by revealing a vest with "100" on it. He was subsequently booked for his celebration.

On 1 September 2009 it was confirmed that he had signed for Charlton Athletic. He scored his first and only goal for Charlton against Southampton in the Football League Trophy on 11 November 2009. He was one of six players to be released by Charlton Athletic following the end of the 2009–10 league season. On 8 September 2010 it was confirmed he had signed a contract with Northampton Town until the end of 2010–11 season.

McKenzie featured in a friendly for Conference club Luton Town against Bedford Town prior to the 2011–12 season. On 15 December 2011 Mckenzie announced his retirement from professional football. He played his final game on 17 December 2011, after which he made a music single teaming up. ambitions. In July 2012, however, McKenzie came out of retirement to sign for Conference North side Corby Town.

On 1 January 2013 Leon played his last football game for Conference North side Corby Town and is now officially retired from football.

== Personal life ==
He is the son of former British and European boxing champion Clinton McKenzie and nephew of three time world boxing champion Duke McKenzie. Leon has written an autobiography which was published by MacAnthony Media, and was released on 29 November 2012. Leon is a head coach at 12x3 gym in Aldgate East and speaks internationally about mental health. Leon is divorced and has five children – Kasey McKenzie, Mariya McKenzie, Naima McKenzie, Talia McKenzie and Teagan-Faith Courtney Mckenzie.

McKenzie has said that he has had depression. He was jailed for six months on 21 February 2012 for trying to avoid speeding convictions. In December 2011 McKenzie admitted that he had tried to take his own life whilst a player with Charlton. McKenzie has gone onto be a speaker and ambassador for mental health.

== Boxing career ==
McKenzie made his boxing debut on 29 June 2013 when he fought John Mason at York Hall, Bethnal Green in London. The fight was stopped in the second round with McKenzie picking up a victory in his first professional bout.

On 14 March 2015 McKenzie won his first title by beating Ivan Stupalo at York Hall to win the International masters belt, which made him the mandatory challenger for the Southern area title. On 17 October 2015 McKenzie beat the previously undefeated John McCallum at York Hall. The contest was brought to a halt at the end of the sixth round after McCallum was pulled out by his corner after suffering a badly damaged left eye. This edged McKenzie closer to a shot at the British super-middleweight title.

On 12 November 2016 McKenzie fought Jahmaine Smyle at York Hall for the English super-middleweight title, but lost for the first time in his career.

On 10 September 2017 McKenzie retired from boxing, after a four-year career. He said he hopes to change mental health issues and inspire in other ways to help people.

== Professional boxing record ==
8 Wins (3 knockouts, 4 decisions, 1 retired), 2 Losses, 1 Draw
Res.	Record	Opponent	Type	Round	Date	Location	Notes
Loss	8-2-1	(United Kingdom) Cello Renda	TKO	9 (10)	2017-09-09	(England) York Hall, Bethnal Green, London	For vacant BBBofC Southern Area Super Middleweight Title
Loss	8-1-1	(United Kingdom) Jahmaine Smyle	SD	10	2016-11-12	(England) York Hall, Bethnal Green, London	For BBBofC English Super Middleweight Title
Win	8-0-1	(United Kingdom) Kelvin Young	TKO	1	2016–01–30	(England) Copper Box Arena, Hackney Wick, London	English super-middleweight final eliminator
Win	7-0-1	(United Kingdom) John McCallum	RTD	6 (10)	2015–10–17	(England) York Hall, Bethnal Green, London	British super-middleweight title eliminator
Win	6-0-1	(Croatia) Ivan Stupalo	PTS	10	2015–03–14	(England) York Hall, Bethnal Green, London	International Masters super middleweight title
Win	5-0-1	(United Kingdom) Scott Douglas	PTS	6	2014–12–13	(England) York Hall, Bethnal Green, London	
Win	4-0-1	(United Kingdom) Danny Brown	PTS	6	2014–05–17	(England) York Hall, Bethnal Green, London	
Win	3-0-1	(Bulgaria) Nikola Varbanov	KO	2 (4)	2014–03–08	(England) York Hall, Bethnal Green, London	
Draw	2-0-1	(United Kingdom) Darren McKenna	PTS	4	2013–12–07	(England) York Hall, Bethnal Green, London	
Win	2–0	(Poland) Robert Studzinski	PTS	4	2013–09–14	(England) Epic Centre, Norwich, Norfolk	
Win	1–0	(United Kingdom) John Mason	TKO	2 (4)	2013–06–29	(England) York Hall, Bethnal Green, London	Professional debut.

== Honours ==
=== Football ===
Crystal Palace

- Football League First Division play-offs: 1997

Norwich City

- Football League First Division: 2003–04

=== Boxing Titles ===
- International Masters Belt beut
