= 1998–99 Football League =

100th season of the Football League

The Football League
- Season: 1998–99
- Champions: Sunderland
- Promoted: Bradford City; Watford
- Relegated: Scarborough
- New Club in League: Halifax Town

The 1998–99 Football League (known as the Nationwide Football League for sponsorship reasons) was the 100th completed season of The Football League.

Sunderland were crowned First Division champions with 105 points, then a record, having lost just three games all season, to prove right the many pundits who tipped them for promotion. The two other promotion places were secured by two of the division's least fancied sides—runners-up Bradford City (back in the top division for the first time in 77 years) and playoff winners Watford (who had won their second successive promotion during Graham Taylor's second spell as manager).

Bury, Oxford United and Bristol City occupied the three relegation places in the First Division. Oxford's dismal season was mainly down to £10 million debts which were putting the club in real danger of closure, and had also resulted in the suspension of construction of their new stadium near the Blackbird Leys estate.

Kevin Keegan completed his spell as Fulham manager before taking the England job by guiding the Cottagers to the Second Division championship with a staggering 101 points. Following them up were runners-up Walsall and playoff winners Manchester City.

Going down were York City, Northampton Town, Lincoln City and Macclesfield Town. Narrowly avoiding the drop to the Third Division were Oldham Athletic, who just five years earlier had been a Premiership side who came within a whisker of reaching the FA Cup final.

Brentford, Cambridge United, Cardiff City and Scunthorpe United occupied the four promotion places in the Third Division.

Carlisle United kept their league status in remarkable fashion. They entered the final game of the season in bottom place, and with 90 minutes on the clock in their home game against Plymouth Argyle they were drawing 1–1 and needed a win to stay up. The referee then allowed 4 minutes of stoppage time and with just seconds to go, goalkeeper Jimmy Glass came upfield and scored from a rebounded corner to preserve his club's place in the league which had been held since 1928. Scarborough, who had only joined the league in 1987, were relegated instead. Glass, 25, had been signed on loan from Swindon Town after the transfer line because an injury crisis had left Carlisle without a goalkeeper for the final few games of the season.

== First Division ==
First Division
- Season: 1998–99
- Champions: Sunderland
- Promoted: Sunderland; Bradford City; Watford
- Relegated: Bury; Oxford United; Bristol City
- Matches: 552
- Goals: 1,455 (2.64 per match)
- Top goalscorer: Lee Hughes (31 goals)

One season after missing out on promotion in a dramatic playoff final defeat, Sunderland clinched a place in the Premier League after a brilliant season which saw them achieve an English league record of 105 points and clinch the Division One title for the second time in four seasons. Bradford City, in their first full season under the management of Paul Jewell, were the surprise package in Division One this season, finishing runners-up to reach the Premier League and return to the top flight of English football for the first time since 1922.

In the playoffs, Watford won at Wembley for the first time in their history, beating Bolton Wanderers 2-0 to secure a second successive promotion and end their 11-year absence from the top flight. Birmingham City and Ipswich Town were the beaten semi-finalists in the playoffs.

Wolves manager Mark McGhee was sacked in early November after a disappointing first three months of the season, with his assistant Colin Lee being appointed manager after a successful interim spell in charge, but Wolves were beaten to a playoff place on the last day of the season. Their local rivals West Bromwich Albion finished 12th but their striker Lee Hughes, in only his second season in league football, finished as the highest scorer in all four divisions with 31 Division One strikes.

New Crystal Palace owner Mark Goldberg's dream to turn the Selhurst Park club into a major force quickly turned into a nightmare as he found himself unable to prevent the club from being crippled by debt, and the team failed to deliver the goods on the pitch. Terry Venables stood down as manager in January, handing over the reins to director of football Steve Coppell, who took charge as manager for the fourth time in 15 years. Coppell guided the Eagles to a 14th place finish in the final table.

Bristol City's return to Division One ended in relegation after just one season as they finished bottom of the table, joined on the final day by Oxford United and Bury.

Pos	Team	Pld	W	D	L	GF	GA	GD	Pts	Qualification or relegation
1	Sunderland (C, P)	46	31	12	3	91	28	+63	105	Promotion to the Premier League
2	Bradford City (P)	46	26	9	11	82	47	+35	87	Promotion to the Premier League
3	Ipswich Town	46	26	8	12	69	32	+37	86	Qualification for the First Division play-offs
4	Birmingham City	46	23	12	11	66	37	+29	81	Qualification for the First Division play-offs
5	Watford (O, P)	46	21	14	11	65	56	+9	77	Qualification for the First Division play-offs
6	Bolton Wanderers	46	20	16	10	78	59	+19	76	Qualification for the First Division play-offs
7	Wolverhampton Wanderers	46	19	16	11	64	43	+21	73	
8	Sheffield United	46	18	13	15	71	66	+5	67	
9	Norwich City	46	15	17	14	62	61	+1	62	
10	Huddersfield Town	46	15	16	15	62	71	−9	61	
11	Grimsby Town	46	17	10	19	40	52	−12	61	
12	West Bromwich Albion	46	16	11	19	69	76	−7	59	
13	Barnsley	46	14	17	15	59	56	+3	59	
14	Crystal Palace	46	14	16	16	58	71	−13	58	
15	Tranmere Rovers	46	12	20	14	63	61	+2	56	
16	Stockport County	46	12	17	17	49	60	−11	53	
17	Swindon Town	46	13	11	22	59	81	−22	50	
18	Crewe Alexandra	46	12	12	22	54	78	−24	48	
19	Portsmouth	46	11	14	21	57	73	−16	47	
20	Queens Park Rangers	46	12	11	23	52	61	−9	47	
21	Port Vale	46	13	8	25	45	75	−30	47	
22	Bury (R)	46	10	17	19	35	60	−25	47	Relegation to the Second Division
23	Oxford United (R)	46	10	14	22	48	71	−23	44	Relegation to the Second Division
24	Bristol City (R)	46	9	15	22	57	80	−23	42	Relegation to the Second Division

Rules for classification: 1) Points; 2) Goals scored; 3) Goal difference
(C) Champions; (O) Play-off winners; (P) Promoted; (R) Relegated

=== Play-offs ===
Semifinals; 1st leg – May 16; 2nd leg – May 19/20, 1999
3rd	Ipswich Town	0	4	4
6th	Bolton Wanderers (Note: Bolton Wanderers the first round of the play-offs against Ipswich Town on away goals after extra time.)	1	3	4
4th	Birmingham City	0	1	1 (6)
5th	Watford (pen.)	1	0	1 (7)

Final at Wembley; May 31, 1999
5th	Watford	2
6th	Bolton Wanderers	0

=== First Division results ===
Home \ Away	BAR	BIR	BOL	BRA	BRI	BRY	CRE	CRY	GRI	HUD	IPS	NWC	OXF	PTV	POR	QPR	SHU	STP	SUN	SWI	TRA	WAT	WBA	WOL
Barnsley		0–0	2–2	0–1	2–0	1–1	2–2	4–0	0–0	7–1	0–1	1–3	1–0	0–2	2–1	1–0	2–1	1–1	1–3	1–3	1–1	2–2	2–2	2–3
Birmingham City	0–0		0–0	2–1	4–2	1–0	3–1	3–1	0–1	1–1	1–0	0–0	0–1	1–0	4–1	1–0	1–0	2–0	0–0	1–1	2–2	1–2	4–0	0–1
Bolton Wanderers	3–3	3–1		0–0	1–0	4–0	1–3	3–0	2–0	3–0	2–0	2–0	1–1	3–1	3–1	2–1	2–2	1–2	0–3	2–1	2–2	1–2	2–1	1–1
Bradford City	2–1	2–1	2–2		5–0	3–0	4–1	2–1	3–0	2–3	0–0	4–1	0–0	4–0	2–1	0–3	2–2	1–2	0–1	3–0	2–0	2–0	1–0	2–1
Bristol City	1–1	1–2	2–1	2–3		1–1	5–2	1–1	4–1	1–2	0–1	1–0	2–2	2–0	2–2	0–0	2–0	1–1	0–1	3–1	1–1	1–4	1–3	1–6
Bury	0–0	2–4	2–1	0–2	0–1		1–0	0–0	1–0	1–0	0–3	0–2	1–0	1–0	2–1	1–1	3–3	1–1	2–5	3–0	0–0	1–3	2–0	0–0
Crewe Alexandra	3–1	0–0	4–4	2–1	1–0	3–1		0–1	0–0	1–2	0–3	3–2	3–1	0–0	3–1	0–2	1–2	0–2	1–4	0–2	1–4	0–1	1–1	0–0
Crystal Palace	1–0	1–1	2–2	1–0	2–1	4–2	1–1		3–1	2–2	3–2	5–1	2–0	0–1	4–1	1–1	1–0	2–2	1–1	0–1	1–1	2–2	1–1	3–2
Grimsby Town	1–2	0–3	0–1	2–0	2–1	0–0	1–1	2–0		1–0	0–0	0–1	1–0	2–2	1–1	1–0	1–2	1–0	0–2	1–0	1–0	2–1	5–1	0–0
Huddersfield Town	0–1	1–1	3–2	2–1	2–2	2–2	0–0	4–0	2–0		2–2	1–1	2–0	2–1	3–3	2–0	1–0	3–0	1–1	1–2	0–0	2–0	0–3	2–1
Ipswich Town	0–2	1–0	0–1	3–0	3–1	0–0	1–2	3–0	0–1	3–0		0–1	2–1	1–0	3–0	3–1	4–1	1–0	0–2	1–0	1–0	3–2	2–0	2–0
Norwich City	0–0	2–0	2–2	2–2	2–1	0–0	2–1	0–1	3–1	4–1	0–0		1–3	3–4	0–0	4–2	1–1	0–2	2–2	2–1	2–2	1–1	1–1	0–0
Oxford United	1–0	1–7	0–0	0–1	0–0	0–1	1–1	1–3	0–0	2–2	3–3	2–4		2–1	3–0	4–1	0–2	5–0	0–0	2–0	1–2	0–0	3–0	0–2
Port Vale	1–0	0–2	0–2	1–1	3–2	1–0	1–0	1–0	0–1	2–0	0–3	1–0	1–0		0–2	2–0	2–3	1–1	0–2	0–1	2–2	1–2	0–3	2–1
Portsmouth	1–3	0–1	0–2	2–4	0–1	2–1	2–0	1–1	0–1	1–0	0–0	1–2	2–2	4–0		3–0	1–0	3–1	1–1	5–2	1–1	1–2	2–1	1–0
Queens Park Rangers	2–1	0–1	2–0	1–3	1–1	0–0	0–1	6–0	1–2	1–1	1–1	2–0	1–0	3–2	1–1		1–2	2–0	2–2	4–0	0–0	1–2	2–1	0–1
Sheffield United	1–1	0–2	1–2	2–2	3–1	3–1	3–1	1–1	3–2	2–1	1–2	2–1	1–2	3–0	2–1	2–0		1–1	0–4	2–1	2–2	3–0	3–0	1–1
Stockport County	0–1	1–0	0–1	1–2	2–2	0–0	1–1	1–1	2–0	1–1	0–1	0–2	2–0	4–2	2–0	0–0	1–0		0–1	2–1	0–0	1–1	2–2	1–2
Sunderland	2–3	2–1	3–1	0–0	1–1	1–0	2–0	2–0	3–1	2–0	2–1	1–0	7–0	2–0	2–0	1–0	0–0	1–0		2–0	5–0	4–1	3–0	2–1
Swindon Town	1–3	0–1	3–3	1–4	3–2	1–1	1–2	2–0	2–0	3–0	0–6	1–1	4–1	1–1	3–3	3–1	2–2	2–3	1–1		2–3	1–4	2–2	1–0
Tranmere Rovers	3–0	0–1	1–1	0–1	1–1	4–0	3–0	3–1	1–2	2–3	0–2	1–3	2–2	1–1	1–1	3–2	2–3	1–1	1–0	0–0		3–2	3–1	1–2
Watford	0–0	1–1	2–0	1–0	1–0	0–0	4–2	2–1	1–0	1–1	1–0	1–1	2–0	2–2	0–0	2–1	1–1	4–2	2–1	0–1	2–1		0–2	0–2
West Bromwich Albion	2–0	1–3	2–3	0–2	2–2	1–0	1–5	3–2	1–1	3–1	0–1	2–0	2–0	3–2	2–2	2–0	4–1	3–1	2–3	1–1	0–2	4–1		2–0
Wolverhampton Wanderers	1–1	3–1	1–1	2–3	3–0	1–0	3–0	0–0	2–0	2–2	1–0	2–2	1–1	3–1	2–0	1–2	2–1	2–2	1–1	1–0	2–0	0–0	1–1	

Legend: Blue = home team win; Yellow = draw; Red = away team win.

=== First Division maps ===
Locations of the Football League First Division London teams 1998–99
Locations of the Football League First Division 1998–1999 teams

=== Attendances ===
#	Club	Average
1	Sunderland	38,745
2	Wolverhampton Wanderers	22,620
3	Birmingham City	20,794
4	Bolton Wanderers	18,196
5	Crystal Palace	17,123
6	Ipswich Town	16,963
7	Barnsley	16,269
8	Sheffield United	16,258
9	Norwich City	15,761
10	West Bromwich Albion	14,582
11	Bradford City	14,299
12	Huddersfield Town	12,980
13	Bristol City	12,840
14	Portsmouth	11,956
15	Watford	11,822
16	Queens Park Rangers	11,793
17	Swindon Town	8,651
18	Stockport County	7,898
19	Oxford United	7,040
20	Port Vale	6,991
21	Tranmere Rovers	6,930
22	Grimsby Town	6,698
23	Bury	5,475
24	Crewe Alexandra	5,269

== Second Division ==
Second Division
- Season: 1998–99
- Champions: Fulham
- Promoted: Fulham; Walsall; Manchester City
- Relegated: York City; Northampton Town; Lincoln City; Macclesfield Town
- Matches: 552
- Goals: 1,358 (2.46 per match)
- Top goalscorer: Jamie Cureton (25 goals)

One season after falling in the Division Two playoffs, Fulham established themselves as the pace-setters in the division this season and finished as runaway champions with 101 points. Manager Kevin Keegan accepted the FA's offer to take charge of the England team in February, but remained in charge at Craven Cottage until the end of the season before handing over the reins to Paul Bracewell, leaving Fulham with just one more promotion to win before achieving their goal of a place in the Premier League.

The final promotion place was secured by Manchester City, playing in the third tier for the first time in their history. A frustrating first few months of the season mounted the pressure on manager Joe Royle, but the Maine Road board kept faith in him and were rewarded by an upturn in form which saw them finish third in the final table. After overcoming another Greater Manchester club, Wigan Athletic, in the playoff semi-finals, City took on Gillingham in the Wembley final but looked to have surrendered promotion to the Kent side who were still 2–0 up with 90 minutes on the clock. Then came two goals in added time which forced extra time, with City winning on penalties and sealing an instant return to Division One.

In their final season at Springfield Park, the one time home of the long-defunct Wigan Borough and their own home since formation in 1932, Wigan Athletic clinched the Football League Trophy, some compensation for their subsequent failure in the Division Two playoffs. The other losing semi-finalists in the playoffs were Preston North End, who managed to retain the services of their highly-rated new manager David Moyes despite interest from Manchester United, who were looking to appoint a new assistant manager halfway through the season.

Stoke City, who had frequently led Division Two in the first half of the season, looked all set to return to Division One at the first time of asking, before a slump in the second half of the season dragged them down to seventh in the final table - not even enough for a playoff place. Manager Brian Little left after just one season in charge and was succeeded by Gary Megson. There was similar disappointment for Reading, also newly relegated from Division One, who could only manage a 10th place finish in their first season at the new Madejski Stadium.

Newly promoted Macclesfield Town and Lincoln City went straight back down to Division Three, and were joined by Northampton Town (playoff finalists the previous season) and a York City side who had rarely been out of the relegation battle during the previous three seasons and finally ran out of luck following the sale of top scorer Richard Cresswell to Sheffield Wednesday in March. Relegation also brought about the end of Alan Little's reign at Bootham Crescent after more than six years at the helm. Oldham Athletic had a lucky escape from relegation in their first season under player-manager Andy Ritchie, with the man whose goals had helped them reach the top flight eight years earlier was faced with the challenge of keeping them out of the league's fourth tier.

Pos	Team	Pld	W	D	L	GF	GA	GD	Pts	Qualification or relegation
1	Fulham (C, P)	46	31	8	7	79	32	+47	101	Promotion to the First Division
2	Walsall (P)	46	26	9	11	63	47	+16	87	Promotion to the First Division
3	Manchester City (O, P)	46	22	16	8	69	33	+36	82	Qualification for the Second Division play-offs
4	Gillingham	46	22	14	10	75	44	+31	80	Qualification for the Second Division play-offs
5	Preston North End	46	22	13	11	78	50	+28	79	Qualification for the Second Division play-offs
6	Wigan Athletic	46	22	10	14	75	48	+27	76	Qualification for the Second Division play-offs
7	Bournemouth	46	21	13	12	63	41	+22	76	
8	Stoke City	46	21	6	19	59	63	−4	69	
9	Chesterfield	46	17	13	16	46	44	+2	64	
10	Millwall	46	17	11	18	52	59	−7	62	
11	Reading	46	16	13	17	54	63	−9	61	
12	Luton Town	46	16	10	20	51	60	−9	58	
13	Bristol Rovers	46	13	17	16	65	56	+9	56	
14	Blackpool	46	14	14	18	44	54	−10	56	
15	Burnley	46	13	16	17	54	73	−19	55	
16	Notts County	46	14	12	20	52	61	−9	54	
17	Wrexham	46	13	14	19	43	62	−19	53	
18	Colchester United	46	12	16	18	52	70	−18	52	
19	Wycombe Wanderers	46	13	12	21	52	58	−6	51	
20	Oldham Athletic	46	14	9	23	48	66	−18	51	
21	York City (R)	46	13	11	22	56	80	−24	50	Relegation to the Third Division
22	Northampton Town (R)	46	10	18	18	43	57	−14	48	Relegation to the Third Division
23	Lincoln City (R)	46	13	7	26	42	74	−32	46	Relegation to the Third Division
24	Macclesfield Town (R)	46	11	10	25	43	63	−20	43	Relegation to the Third Division

Rules for classification: 1) Points; 2) Goals scored; 3) Goal difference
(C) Champions; (O) Play-off winners; (P) Promoted; (R) Relegated

=== Play-offs ===
Semifinals; 1st leg – May 15th/16th; 2nd leg – May 19th, 1999
3rd	Manchester City	1	1	2
6th	Wigan Athletic	1	0	1
4th	Gillingham	1	1	2
5th	Preston North End	1	0	1

Final at Wembley Stadium; May 30th, 1999
3rd	Manchester City (pen.)	2 (3)
4th	Gillingham	2 (1)

=== Second Division maps ===
Locations of the Football League Second Division London teams 1998–1999
Locations of the Football League Second Division 1998–1999 teams

== Third Division ==
Brentford achieved an instant return to Division Two under new chairman-manager Ron Noades, who took them to the Division Three title with 85 points. Cambridge United finally won promotion from Division Three at the fourth time of asking, clinching promotion as runners-up after three successive mid table finishes. The final automatic promotion place was sealed by Cardiff City, who enjoyed a big improvement in form to finish third just 12 months after finishing 21st. Scunthorpe United triumphed over Leyton Orient 1-0 in the playoff final to clinch the fourth and final promotion place, and ending their lengthy spell in the league's fourth tier.

A dramatic final day brought one of the most memorable moments of the season in the battle to stay in the Football League. An injury crisis had forced Carlisle United to bring in Swindon Town goalkeeper Jimmy Glass on loan after the transfer deadline. They went into their final game of the season needing to beat Plymouth Argyle at Brunton Park to stay in the Football League, but the score was still 1–1 with 90 minutes showing on the clock. With only seconds of extra time remaining, Glass ran the full length of the pitch when Carlisle won a corner to fire in a late winner to keep Carlisle in the league and relegate Scarborough.

Football League, Third Division
- Season: 1998–99
- Champions: Brentford (2nd fourth tier title)
- Direct promotion: Brentford, Cambridge United, Cardiff City
- Promoted through play-offs: Scunthorpe United
- Relegated to Conference: Scarborough
- New club in the league: None
- Matches: 552
- Goals: 1,395 (2.53 per match)
- Top goalscorer: Marco Gabbiadini (Darlington), 23

Pos	Team	Pld	W	D	L	GF	GA	GD	Pts	Promotion or relegation
1	Brentford (C, P)	46	26	7	13	79	56	+23	85	Promotion to the Second Division
2	Cambridge United (P)	46	23	12	11	78	48	+30	81	Promotion to the Second Division
3	Cardiff City (P)	46	22	14	10	60	39	+21	80	Promotion to the Second Division
4	Scunthorpe United (O, P)	46	22	8	16	69	58	+11	74	Qualification for the Third Division play-offs
5	Rotherham United	46	20	13	13	79	61	+18	73	Qualification for the Third Division play-offs
6	Leyton Orient	46	19	15	12	68	59	+9	72	Qualification for the Third Division play-offs
7	Swansea City	46	19	14	13	56	48	+8	71	Qualification for the Third Division play-offs
8	Mansfield Town	46	19	10	17	60	58	+2	67	
9	Peterborough United	46	18	12	16	72	56	+16	66	
10	Halifax Town	46	17	15	14	58	56	+2	66	
11	Darlington	46	18	11	17	69	58	+11	65	
12	Exeter City	46	17	12	17	47	50	−3	63	
13	Plymouth Argyle	46	17	10	19	58	54	+4	61	
14	Chester City	46	13	18	15	57	66	−9	57	
15	Shrewsbury Town	46	14	14	18	52	63	−11	56	
16	Barnet	46	14	13	19	54	71	−17	55	
17	Brighton & Hove Albion	46	16	7	23	49	66	−17	55	
18	Southend United	46	14	12	20	52	58	−6	54	
19	Rochdale	46	13	15	18	42	55	−13	54	
20	Torquay United	46	12	17	17	47	58	−11	53	
21	Hull City	46	14	11	21	44	62	−18	53	
22	Hartlepool United	46	13	12	21	52	65	−13	51	
23	Carlisle United	46	11	16	19	43	53	−10	49	
24	Scarborough (R)	46	14	6	26	50	77	−27	48	Relegation to Football Conference

Rules for classification: 1) Points; 2) Goals scored; 3) Goal difference
(C) Champions; (O) Play-off winners; (P) Promoted; (R) Relegated

=== Play-offs ===
Semifinals; 1st leg – May 16; 2nd leg – May 19, 1999
4th	Scunthorpe United	0	3	3
7th	Swansea City	1	1	2
5th	Rotherham United	0	0	0 (2)
6th	Leyton Orient (pen.)	0	0	0 (4)

Final at Wembley Stadium; May 29th, 1999
4th	Scunthorpe United	1
6th	Leyton Orient	0

=== Third Division maps ===
Locations of the Football League Third Division London teams 1998–1999
Locations of the Football League Third Division teams 1998–1999

== See also ==
- 1998-99 in English football
- 1998 in association football
- 1999 in association football
