= 1990–91 Crystal Palace F.C. season =

English football club season

Crystal Palace
1990–91 season
- Chairman: Ron Noades
- Manager: Steve Coppell
- Stadium: Selhurst Park
- First Division: 3rd
- FA Cup: Third round
- League Cup: Fourth round
- Full Members' Cup: Winners
- Player of the Year: Geoff Thomas
- Top goalscorer: League: Wright (15); All: Wright (25)
- Highest home attendance: 28,880 vs Southampton (9 Mar 1991, First Division)
- Lowest home attendance: 5,209 vs Bristol Rovers (18 Dec 1990, Full Members' Cup)
- Average home league attendance: 19,660
Home colours

During the 1990–91 English football season, Crystal Palace F.C. competed in the Football League First Division.

== Season summary ==
In their second consecutive season in the First Division, Crystal Palace finished an astonishing third, their highest ever league placing, although, due to Liverpool's ban from European competition being lifted early, Palace did not qualify for the UEFA Cup. Palace also won their first ever cup during the season, albeit the less significant Full Members' Cup.

In the League Cup, Palace broke their record for a cup victory with an 8–0 over Southend United, in the second round first leg, with strikers Mark Bright and Ian Wright both scoring hat-tricks. The two claimed the match ball; it was given away at a charity auction.

At the end of the season, captain Geoff Thomas was named the Supporters' Player of the Year. Thomas was rewarded for his good form with a call-up to the England squad for a European Championship qualifying game against Turkey in May.

Bukta remained Palace's kit manufacturers, and introduced a new home kit for the season. English airline Virgin Atlantic remained the kit sponsors.

== Final league table ==
Pos	Team	Pld	W	D	L	GF	GA	GD	Pts	Qualification or relegation
1	Arsenal (C)	38	24	13	1	74	18	+56	83 (Note: Arsenal deducted two points; Manchester United deducted one point due to a brawl in a game between both teams.)	Qualification for the European Cup first round
2	Liverpool	38	23	7	8	77	40	+37	76	Qualification for the UEFA Cup first round
3	Crystal Palace	38	20	9	9	50	41	+9	69	
4	Leeds United	38	19	7	12	65	47	+18	64	
5	Manchester City	38	17	11	10	64	53	+11	62	

Source: World Football
Rules for classification: 1) Points; 2) Goal difference; 3) Goals scored
(C) Champions
Notes:

Results summary

Overall								Home						Away					
Pld	W	D	L	GF	GA	GD	Pts	W	D	L	GF	GA	GD	W	D	L	GF	GA	GD
38	20	9	9	50	41	+9	69	11	6	2	26	17	+9	9	3	7	24	24	0

Source: Statto

Results by round

Round	1	2	3	4	5	6	7	8	9	10	11	12	13	14	15	16	17	18	19	20	21	22	23	24	25	26	27	28	29	30	31	32	33	34	35	36	37	38
Ground	A	H	H	A	H	A	A	H	A	H	A	H	A	A	H	A	H	A	H	H	A	A	H	A	H	A	A	H	H	A	A	H	H	H	H	A	A	H
Result	D	W	W	W	D	D	W	D	D	W	L	D	W	W	W	L	W	W	W	W	L	W	L	W	D	L	L	W	W	W	L	L	D	W	D	L	W	W
Position	8	4	4	2	4	5	4	4	4	4	4	4	4	4	3	4	3	3	3	3	3	3	3	3	3	3	3	3	3	3	3	3	3	3	3	3	3	3

Source: Statto.com
A = Away; H = Home; W = Win; D = Draw; L = Loss

== Results ==
Crystal Palace's score comes first

=== Legend ===
Win	Draw	Loss

=== Football League First Division ===
Date	Opponent	Venue	Result	Attendance	Scorers
25 August 1990	Luton Town	A	1–1	9,583	Young
28 August 1990	Chelsea	H	2–1	27,101	Gray, Wright
1 September 1990	Sheffield United	H	1–0	16,831	Thompson
8 September 1990	Norwich City	A	3–0	15,306	Barber, Wright, Salako
15 September 1990	Nottingham Forest	H	2–2	20,545	Shaw, Thomas
22 September 1990	Tottenham Hotspur	A	1–1	34,859	Thomas
29 September 1990	Derby County	A	2–0	15,202	Wright, Bright
6 October 1990	Leeds United	H	1–1	21,676	Thomas
20 October 1990	Everton	A	0–0	24,504	
27 October 1990	Wimbledon	H	4–3	17,220	Bright, Gray, Humphrey, Thomas
3 November 1990	Manchester United	A	0–2	45,724	
10 November 1990	Arsenal	H	0–0	28,181	
17 November 1990	Queens Park Rangers	A	2–1	14,360	Wright (2)
24 November 1990	Southampton	A	3–2	15,851	Wright (2), Bright
1 December 1990	Coventry City	H	2–1	17,052	Bright, Gray
8 December 1990	Chelsea	A	1–2	21,558	Thorn
16 December 1990	Luton Town	H	1–0	15,579	Bright
22 December 1990	Manchester City	A	2–0	25,321	Pointon (own goal), Wright
16 December 1990	Sunderland	H	2–1	15,560	Salako, Bright
30 December 1990	Liverpool	H	1–0	26,280	Bright
1 January 1991	Aston Villa	A	0–2	25,523	
12 January 1991	Sheffield United	A	1–0	17,139	Bright
19 January 1991	Norwich City	H	1–3	17,201	Bright
2 February 1991	Nottingham Forest	A	1–0	17,045	Young
16 February 1991	Queens Park Rangers	H	0–0	16,006	
23 February 1991	Arsenal	A	0–4	42,512	
2 March 1991	Coventry City	A	1–3	10,891	Wright
9 March 1991	Southampton	H	2–1	14,439	Thomas (2)
16 March 1991	Derby County	H	2–1	14,752	Gray, Wright
23 March 1991	Leeds United	A	2–1	28,556	Wright, Salako
30 March 1991	Sunderland	A	1–2	19,704	Pardew
1 April 1991	Manchester City	H	1–3	18,001	Salako
13 April 1991	Aston Villa	H	0–0	18,331	
17 April 1991	Tottenham Hotspur	H	1–0	26,285	Young
20 April 1991	Everton	H	0–0	16,439	
23 April 1991	Liverpool	A	0–3	36,767	
4 May 1991	Wimbledon	A	3–0	10,002	Wright (3)
11 May 1991	Manchester United	H	3–0	25,301	Wright, Salako (2)

=== FA Cup ===
Round	Date	Opponent	Venue	Result	Attendance	Goalscorers
R3	6 January 1991	Nottingham Forest	H	0–0	15,396	
R3R	21 January 1991	Nottingham Forest	A	2–2 (a.e.t.)	23,301	Wright, Salako
R3R2	28 January 1991	Nottingham Forest	A	0–3	22,164	

=== League Cup ===
Round	Date	Opponent	Venue	Result	Attendance	Goalscorers
R2 1st Leg	25 September 1990	Southend United	H	8–0	5,666	Bright (3), Wright (3), Thompson, Hodges
R2 2nd Leg	9 October 1990	Southend United	A	2–1 (won 10–1 on agg)	5,199	Young, Salako
R3	30 October 1990	Leyton Orient	H	0–0	12,958	
R3R	7 November 1990	Leyton Orient	A	1–0	10,158	Bright
R4	27 November 1990	Southampton	A	0–2	13,765	

=== Full Members' Cup ===
Round	Date	Opponent	Venue	Result	Attendance	Goalscorers
SR2	18 December 1990	Bristol Rovers	H	2–1	5,209	Salako, Gray
SQF	18 February 1991	Brighton & Hove Albion	A	2–0 (a.e.t.)	9,633	Bright, Wright
SSF	26 February 1991	Luton Town	H	3–1	7,170	McGoldrick, Wright (2)
SF 1st Leg	5 March 1991	Norwich City	A	1–1	7,554	Thomas
SF 2nd Leg	19 March 1991	Norwich City	H	2–0 (won 3–1 on agg)	13,857	Bright, Wright
F	7 April 1991	Everton	N	4–1 (a.e.t.)	52,460	Thomas 67', Wright 101', 115', Salako 113'

== Squad ==
Note: Flags indicate national team as defined under FIFA eligibility rules; some limited exceptions apply. Players may hold more than one non-FIFA nationality.

Pos.	Nation	Player
GK	ENG	Nigel Martyn
GK	ENG	Perry Suckling
GK	ENG	Andy Woodman
DF	ENG	Alex Dyer
DF	ENG	Rudi Hedman
DF	ENG	John Humphrey
DF	ENG	Gary O'Reilly
DF	ENG	Richard Shaw
DF	ENG	Gareth Southgate
DF	ENG	Andy Thorn
DF	ENG	Tony Witter
DF	WAL	Paul Bodin
DF	WAL	Jeff Hopkins
DF	WAL	Eric Young
MF	ENG	Phil Barber

Pos.	Nation	Player
MF	ENG	Andy Gray
MF	ENG	Ricky Newman
MF	ENG	Simon Osborn
MF	ENG	Alan Pardew
MF	ENG	Simon Rodger
MF	ENG	John Salako
MF	ENG	Geoff Thomas (captain)
MF	WAL	Glyn Hodges
MF	IRL	Eddie McGoldrick
FW	ENG	Mark Bright
FW	ENG	Stan Collymore
FW	ENG	Jamie Moralee
FW	ENG	Garry Thompson
FW	ENG	Ian Wright
FW	ENG	David Whyte

=== Left club during season ===
Note: Flags indicate national team as defined under FIFA eligibility rules; some limited exceptions apply. Players may hold more than one non-FIFA nationality.

Pos.	Nation	Player
DF	ENG	Mark Dennis (retired)

== Transfers ==
=== In ===
Date	Pos	Name	From	Fee
2 July 1990	MF	Simon Rodger	Bognor Regis Town	£1,000
16 July 1990	MF	Glyn Hodges	Watford	£410,000
15 August 1990	DF	Eric Young	Wimbledon	£850,000
16 August 1990	DF	John Humphrey	Charlton Athletic	£400,000
24 October 1990	DF	Tony Witter	Grays Athletic	£10,000
4 January 1991	FW	Stan Collymore	Stafford Rangers	£100,000
20 March 1991	DF	Paul Bodin	Swindon Town	£550,000

=== Out ===
Date	Pos	Name	To	Fee
27 July 1990	DF	John Pemberton	Sheffield United	£300,000
6 August 1990	DF	Adam Locke	Southend United	Free transfer
30 August 1990	DF	Chris Powell	Southend United	Free transfer
30 November 1990	DF	Alex Dyer	Charlton Athletic	£100,000
17 January 1991	MF	Glyn Hodges	Sheffield United	£450,000

Transfers in: ▼£2,321,000
Transfers out: ▲£850,000
Total spending: ▼£1,471,000
