= 1992–93 Sheffield Wednesday F.C. season =

English football club season

Sheffield Wednesday
1992–93 season
- Chairman: Dave Richards
- Manager: Trevor Francis (player-manager)
- Stadium: Hillsborough Stadium
- Premier League: 7th
- FA Cup: Runners-up (finalist)
- League Cup: Runners-up (finalist)
- UEFA Cup: Second round
- Top goalscorer: League: Bright/Hirst (11); All: Bright (18)
- Average home league attendance: 27,263
Home colours	Away colours

During the 1992–93 English football season, Sheffield Wednesday competed in the inaugural season of the FA Premier League.

== Season summary ==
Sheffield Wednesday enjoyed a great season, finishing seventh in the inaugural Premier League season having a joint highest winning run of 7 alongside Manchester United and reaching the finals of both domestic cups, only to be defeated in both by Arsenal. The only negative from an otherwise good season occurred in Europe, with the club being knocked out of the UEFA Cup in the second round.

== Final league table ==
Pos	Team	Pld	W	D	L	GF	GA	GD	Pts
5	Queens Park Rangers	42	17	12	13	63	55	+8	63
6	Liverpool	42	16	11	15	62	55	+7	59
7	Sheffield Wednesday	42	15	14	13	55	51	+4	59
8	Tottenham Hotspur	42	16	11	15	60	66	−6	59
9	Manchester City	42	15	12	15	56	51	+5	57

Source: Premier League
Rules for classification: 1) points; 2) goal difference; 3) number of goals scored.

== Results ==
Sheffield Wednesday's score comes first

=== Legend ===
Win	Draw	Loss

=== FA Premier League ===
Date	Opponent	Venue	Result	Attendance	Scorers
15 August 1992	Everton	A	1–1	27,687	Pearson
19 August 1992	Nottingham Forest	H	2–0	29,623	Hirst (2)
22 August 1992	Chelsea	H	3–3	26,338	Hirst (2, 1 pen), Wilson
25 August 1992	Crystal Palace	A	1–1	14,005	P Williams
29 August 1992	Arsenal	A	1–2	23,389	Hirst
2 September 1992	Coventry City	H	1–2	22,874	Bart-Williams
5 September 1992	Manchester City	H	0–3	27,169	
12 September 1992	Nottingham Forest	A	2–1	19,420	Warhurst, Hyde
19 September 1992	Norwich City	A	0–1	13,367	
27 September 1992	Tottenham Hotspur	H	2–0	24,895	Bright, Anderson
3 October 1992	Liverpool	A	0–1	35,785	
17 October 1992	Oldham Athletic	H	2–1	24,485	Palmer, Bright
24 October 1992	Middlesbrough	A	1–1	18,414	Bright
31 October 1992	Blackburn Rovers	H	0–0	31,044	
8 November 1992	Sheffield United	A	1–1	30,039	Hirst
21 November 1992	Ipswich Town	H	1–1	24,270	Thompson (own goal)
28 November 1992	Wimbledon	A	1–1	5,740	Bart-Williams
5 December 1992	Aston Villa	H	1–2	29,964	Bright
12 December 1992	Leeds United	A	1–3	29,770	Nilsson
19 December 1992	Queens Park Rangers	H	1–0	23,164	Bright
26 December 1992	Manchester United	H	3–3	37,708	Hirst, Bright, Sheridan
28 December 1992	Southampton	A	2–1	17,426	Sheridan (pen), Hirst
10 January 1993	Norwich City	H	1–0	23,360	Worthington
16 January 1993	Tottenham Hotspur	A	2–0	25,702	Bright, Hirst
30 January 1993	Chelsea	A	2–0	16,261	Warhurst, Harkes
6 February 1993	Everton	H	3–1	24,979	Warhurst, Harkes, Waddle
20 February 1993	Crystal Palace	H	2–1	26,459	Warhurst, Wilson
23 February 1993	Manchester City	A	2–1	23,619	Anderson, Warhurst
27 February 1993	Liverpool	H	1–1	33,964	Anderson
3 March 1993	Coventry City	A	0–1	13,806	
10 March 1993	Ipswich Town	A	1–0	16,538	Hirst
20 March 1993	Aston Villa	A	0–2	38,024	
24 March 1993	Wimbledon	H	1–1	20,918	Bright
7 April 1993	Oldham Athletic	A	1–1	12,312	Watson
10 April 1993	Manchester United	A	1–2	40,102	Sheridan (pen)
12 April 1993	Southampton	H	5–2	26,183	Bright, Bart-Williams (3), King
21 April 1993	Sheffield United	H	1–1	38,688	Warhurst
1 May 1993	Middlesbrough	H	2–3	25,949	Bart-Williams, Morris (own goal)
4 May 1993	Leeds United	H	1–1	26,855	Hirst
6 May 1993	Arsenal	H	1–0	23,645	Bright
8 May 1993	Blackburn Rovers	A	0–1	14,956	
11 May 1993	Queens Park Rangers	A	1–3	12,177	Bright

=== FA Cup ===
Round	Date	Opponent	Venue	Result	Attendance	Goalscorers
R3	13 January 1993	Cambridge United	A	2–1	7,754	Harkes, Bright
R4	24 January 1993	Sunderland	H	1–0	33,422	Bright
R5	13 February 1993	Southend United	H	2–0	26,446	Warhurst (2)
QF	8 March 1993	Derby County	A	3–3	22,511	Warhurst (2), Sheridan (pen)
QFR	17 March 1993	Derby County	H	1–0	32,033	Warhurst
SF	3 April 1993	Sheffield United	N	2–1	75,364	Waddle, Bright
F	15 May 1993	Arsenal	N	1–1 (a.e.t.)	79,347	Hirst
FR	20 May 1993	Arsenal	N	1–2 (a.e.t.)	62,267	Waddle

=== League Cup ===
Round	Date	Opponent	Venue	Result	Attendance	Goalscorers
R2 First Leg	23 September 1992	Hartlepool United	H	3–0	10,112	Watson 61', Bright 66', Wilson 89'
R2 Second Leg	6 October 1992	Hartlepool United	A	2–2 (won 5–2 on agg)	4,667	Bright 1', Warhurst 60'
R3	27 October 1992	Leicester City	H	7–1	17,326	Hirst 18', Worthington 33', Bright (2) 46', 54', Watson (2) 70', 75', Bart Williams 71'
R4	2 December 1992	Queens Park Rangers	H	4–0	17,161	Bright 31', Hirst 33', Palmer 88', Roland Nilsson 88'
QF	19 January 1993	Ipswich Town	A	1–1	19,374	Sheridan 49'
QFR	3 February 1993	Ipswich Town	H	1–0	26,328	Warhurst 52'
SF First Leg	10 February 1993	Blackburn Rovers	A	4–2	17,283	Harkes 14', Sheridan 20', Warhurst (2) 26', 30'
SF Second Leg	14 March 1993	Blackburn Rovers	H	2–1 (won 6–3 on agg)	30,048	Hirst 68', Bright 73'
F	18 April 1993	Arsenal	N	1–2	74,007	Harkes 8'

=== UEFA Cup ===
Round	Date	Opponent	Venue	Result	Attendance	Goalscorers
R1 First Leg	16 September 1992	Spora Luxembourg	H	8–1	19,792	Waddle, Anderson (2), Warhurst (2), Bart-Williams (2), Worthington
R1 Second Leg	1 October 1992	Spora Luxembourg	A	2–1 (won 10–2 on agg)	3,500	Watson, Warhurst
R2 First Leg	20 October 1992	Kaiserslautern	A	1–3	20,802	Hirst
R2 Second Leg	4 November 1992	Kaiserslautern	H	2–2 (lost 3–5 on agg)	27,597	Wilson, Sheridan

== Players ==
=== First-team squad ===
Squad at end of season

Note: Flags indicate national team as defined under FIFA eligibility rules; some limited exceptions apply. Players may hold more than one non-FIFA nationality.

Pos.	Nation	Player
GK	ENG	Lance Key
GK	ENG	Kevin Pressman
GK	ENG	Chris Woods
DF	ENG	Viv Anderson
DF	ENG	Phil King
DF	SWE	Roland Nilsson
DF	ENG	Nigel Pearson (captain)
DF	ENG	Peter Shirtliff
DF	ENG	Simon Stewart
DF	ENG	Paul Warhurst
DF	ENG	Julian Watts
DF	NIR	Nigel Worthington
MF	ENG	Chris Bart-Williams (Note: Bart-Williams was born in Freetown, Sierra Leone, but was raised in England and represented them at U-21 and B level.)
MF	USA	John Harkes

Pos.	Nation	Player
MF	ENG	Graham Hyde
MF	ENG	Ryan Jones (Note: Jones was born in Sheffield, England, but also qualified to represent Wales internationally and made his international debut for Wales in May 1994.)
MF	ENG	Carlton Palmer
MF	IRL	John Sheridan (Note: Sheridan was born in Stretford, England, but also qualified to represent the Republic of Ireland internationally and represented them at U-21 level before making his international debut for the Republic of Ireland in 1988.)
MF	ENG	Chris Waddle
MF	NIR	Danny Wilson (Note: Wilson was born in Wigan, England, but also qualified to represent Northern Ireland internationally and made his international debut for Northern Ireland in 1987.)
FW	ENG	Mark Bright
FW	ENG	Leroy Chambers
FW	ENG	Trevor Francis
FW	ENG	David Hirst
FW	ENG	Nigel Jemson
FW	ENG	Gordon Watson
FW	ENG	Mike Williams
FW	ENG	Paul Williams

== Statistics ==
=== Starting 11 ===
Not considering starts in UEFA Cup

- GK: (England) Chris Woods, 42
- RB: (Sweden) Roland Nilsson, 35
- CB: (England) Carlton Palmer, 36
- CB: (England) Viv Anderson, 26
- LB: (Northern Ireland) Nigel Worthington, 42
- RM: (United States) John Harkes, 26
- CM: (Republic of Ireland) John Sheridan, 28
- LM: (England) Chris Waddle, 35
- CF: (England) Paul Warhurst, 28
- CF: (England) Mark Bright, 31
- CF: (England) David Hirst, 24
