= 1991–92 Crystal Palace F.C. season =

English football club season

Crystal Palace
1991–92 season
- Chairman: Ron Noades
- Manager: Steve Coppell
- Stadium: Selhurst Park
- First Division: 10th
- FA Cup: Third round
- League Cup: Quarter finals
- Full Members Cup: Semi finals
- Top goalscorer: League: Bright (17); All: Bright (22)
- Highest home attendance: 29,017 (vs. Manchester United 30 November)
- Lowest home attendance: 7,185 (vs. Southend United, 22 October)
- Average home league attendance: 15,979
Home colours

During the 1991–92 English football season, Crystal Palace competed in the Football League First Division.

== Season summary ==
The 1991–92 season for Crystal Palace was somewhat anticlimactic football-wise, but controversial in another way. A statement by Ron Noades, which he claimed was reported out of context, stunned Palace's many black players. Noades had apparently claimed that black players didn't play hard enough in winter, but that they made up for it at the end of the season. Although he later stated that he was describing a general attitude amongst managers in earlier decades, and that this was not his own opinion, many of Palace's black players began planning to leave, the most notable departure being that of Ian Wright to Arsenal for £2.5 million (a record for both clubs) in September.

Palace finished 10th in the First Division, having never looked in danger of relegation, but they never challenged the leading pack and would be among the 22 founder members of the new FA Premier League for the 1992–93 season. However, they would be without the services of another key player - Mark Bright - who was sold to Sheffield Wednesday. The Yorkshire club had just finished third in the league and qualified for the UEFA Cup, and were looking more likely to be chasing honours than a Palace side who were now looking like a thin shadow of what they had been a year or two earlier.

== Final league table ==
Pos	Team	Pld	W	D	L	GF	GA	GD	Pts	Qualification or relegation
8	Nottingham Forest	42	16	11	15	60	58	+2	59	Qualification for the FA Premier League
9	Sheffield United	42	16	9	17	65	63	+2	57	Qualification for the FA Premier League
10	Crystal Palace	42	14	15	13	53	61	−8	57	Qualification for the FA Premier League
11	Queens Park Rangers	42	12	18	12	48	47	+1	54	Qualification for the FA Premier League
12	Everton	42	13	14	15	52	51	+1	53	Qualification for the FA Premier League

Source: World Football
Rules for classification: 1) Points; 2) Goal difference; 3) Goals scored

== Results ==
Crystal Palace's score comes first

=== Legend ===
Win	Draw	Loss

=== Football League First Division ===
Date	Opponent	Venue	Result	Attendance	Scorers
24 August 1991	Manchester City	A	2–3	28,028	Thomas, Bright
27 August 1991	Wimbledon	H	3–2	16,736	Bright, Gray (pen), Wright
31 August 1991	Sheffield United	H	2–1	15,507	Thomas, Wright
4 September 1991	Aston Villa	A	1–0	20,740	Wright
7 September 1991	Everton	A	2–2	21,065	Gray (pen), Bright
14 September 1991	Arsenal	H	1–4	24,228	Bright
17 September 1991	West Ham United	H	2–3	21,363	Salako, Wright
21 September 1991	Oldham Athletic	A	3–2	13,391	Salako, Wright, Bright
28 September 1991	Queens Park Rangers	H	2–2	15,372	Bright, Collymore
1 October 1991	Leeds United	H	1–0	18,298	Bright
5 October 1991	Sheffield Wednesday	A	1–4	26,230	Bright
19 October 1991	Coventry City	A	2–1	10,591	Bright, Gabbiadini
26 October 1991	Chelsea	H	0–0	21,841	
2 November 1991	Liverpool	A	2–1	34,231	Gabbiadini, Thomas
16 November 1991	Southampton	H	1–0	15,861	Thomas
23 November 1991	Nottingham Forest	A	1–5	22,387	Thomas
30 November 1991	Manchester United	H	1–3	29,017	Mortimer
7 December 1991	Norwich City	A	3–3	12,667	Newman (own goal), McGoldrick, Osborn
22 December 1991	Tottenham Hotspur	H	1–2	22,491	
26 December 1991	Wimbledon	A	1–1	15,009	Gabbiadini
28 December 1991	Sheffield United	A	1–1	17,969	Gabbiadini
1 January 1992	Notts County	H	1–0	14,202	Gabbiadini
11 January 1992	Manchester City	H	1–1	14,766	Bright
18 January 1992	Leeds United	A	1–1	27,717	Thomas
1 February 1992	Coventry City	H	0–1	13,818	
8 February 1992	Chelsea	A	1–1	17,810	Whyte
16 February 1992	Tottenham Hotspur	A	1–0	19,834	McGoldrick
22 February 1992	Manchester United	A	0–2	46,347	
25 February 1992	Luton Town	H	1–1	12,109	Bright
29 February 1992	Norwich City	H	3–4	14,201	Bright (2), Osborn
3 March 1992	Nottingham Forest	H	0–0	12,608	
7 March 1992	Luton Town	A	1–1	8,591	McGoldrick
11 March 1992	Southampton	A	0–1	12,926	
14 March 1992	Liverpool	H	1–0	23,680	Young
21 March 1992	Aston Villa	H	0–0	15,368	
28 March 1992	Notts County	A	3–2	7,674	Coleman, Bright, Mortimer
4 April 1992	Everton	H	2–0	14,338	Coleman, Bright (pen)
11 April 1992	Arsenal	A	1–4	36,016	Coleman
18 April 1992	Oldham Athletic	H	0–0	12,267	
20 April 1992	West Ham United	A	2–0	17,710	Bright, Coleman
25 April 1992	Sheffield Wednesday	H	1–1	21,573	Bright
2 May 1992	Queens Park Rangers	A	0–1	14,903	

=== FA Cup ===
Round	Date	Opponent	Venue	Result	Attendance	Goalscorers
R3	4 January 1992	Leicester City	A	0–1	19,613	

=== League Cup ===
Round	Date	Opponent	Venue	Result	Attendance	Goalscorers
R2 1st leg	25 September 1991	Hartlepool United	A	1–1	6,697	Bright
R2 2nd leg	8 October 1991	Hartlepool United	H	6–1 (won 7–2 on agg)	9,153	
R3	29 October 1991	Birmingham City	A	1–1	17,270	Gray
R3R	19 November 1991	Birmingham City	H	1–1	10,698	
R3R2	3 December 1991	Birmingham City	H	2–1	11,384	Gray (pen), Thorn
R4	17 December 1991	Swindon Town	A	1–0	10,044	Gray
QF	8 January 1992	Nottingham Forest	H	1–1	14,941	
QFR	5 February 1992	Nottingham Forest	A	2–4	18,918	

=== Full Members Cup ===
Round	Date	Opponent	Venue	Result	Attendance	Goalscorers
R2	22 October 1991	Southend United	H	4–2 (a.e.t.)	7,185	
R3	26 November 1991	Queens Park Rangers	A	3–2	4,492	
S Area SF	10 December 1991	Chelsea	H	0–1	8,416	

== Squad ==
Note: Flags indicate national team as defined under FIFA eligibility rules; some limited exceptions apply. Players may hold more than one non-FIFA nationality.

Pos.	Nation	Player
GK	ENG	Jimmy Glass
GK	ENG	Nigel Martyn
GK	ENG	Perry Suckling
GK	ENG	Neil Sullivan (on loan from Wimbledon)
GK	ENG	Andy Woodman
DF	WAL	Paul Bodin
DF	WAL	Chris Coleman
DF	ENG	Dean Gordon
DF	ENG	Rudi Hedman
DF	WAL	Jeff Hopkins
DF	ENG	John Humphrey
DF	ENG	Richard Shaw
DF	ENG	Lee Sinnott
DF	ENG	Gareth Southgate (captain)
DF	ENG	Andy Thorn
DF	WAL	Eric Young
MF	SKN	Bobby Bowry

Pos.	Nation	Player
MF	ENG	Andy Gray
MF	ENG	Eddie McGoldrick
MF	ENG	Paul Mortimer
MF	ENG	Ricky Newman
MF	ENG	Simon Osborn
MF	ENG	Alan Pardew
MF	ENG	Simon Rodger
MF	ENG	John Salako
MF	ENG	Geoff Thomas
FW	ENG	Andy Barnes
FW	ENG	Mark Bright
FW	ENG	Stan Collymore
FW	ENG	Marco Gabbiadini
FW	ENG	Jamie Moralee
FW	ENG	David Whyte
FW	ENG	Ian Wright

== Transfers ==
=== In ===
Date	Pos	Name	From	Fee
19 July 1991	DF	Chris Coleman	Swansea City	£275,000
8 August 1991	DF	Lee Sinnott	Bradford City	£300,000
1 October 1991	FW	Marco Gabbiadini	Sunderland	£1,800,000
18 October 1991	MF	Paul Mortimer	Aston Villa	£500,000
18 October 1991	MF	Bobby Bowry	Queens Park Rangers	Free transfer

=== Out ===
Date	Pos	Name	To	Fee
25 July 1991	MF	Phil Barber	Millwall	£100,000
19 August 1991	FW	Garry Thompson	Queens Park Rangers	£125,000
19 August 1991	DF	Tony Witter	Queens Park Rangers	£125,000
24 September 1991	FW	Ian Wright	Arsenal	£2,500,000
21 November 1991	MF	Alan Pardew	Charlton Athletic	Free transfer
10 January 1992	DF	Paul Bodin	Swindon Town	£225,000
31 January 1992	FW	Marco Gabbiadini	Derby County	£1,000,000
5 March 1992	DF	Jeff Hopkins	Bristol Rovers	Free transfer
27 May 1992	MF	Andy Gray	Tottenham Hotspur	£700,000

Transfers in: ▼£2,875,000
Transfers out: ▲£4,775,000
Total spending: ▲£1,900,000
