= 1991 Full Members' Cup final =

Crystal Palace	Everton
4	1
- After extra time
- Date: 7 April 1991
- Venue: Wembley Stadium, London
- Attendance: 52,460

The 1991 Full Members' Cup final, also known by its sponsored name, the Zenith Data Systems Cup, was a football match which took place at Wembley Stadium in London, England on 7 April 1991. It was contested between Crystal Palace and Everton. The winners were Crystal Palace by the margin of 4–1 after extra time.

== Match details ==
=== Summary ===
The contest in front of a crowd where Palace fans outnumbered Everton 2 to 1 was a physical event during which Palace players Andy Thorn and Geoff Thomas were booked for fouls, Andy Gray was substituted after a head collision caused a concussion, and the Everton defender Martin Keown suffered a broken nose. The pitch itself was uneven, having hosted an American football match the evening before. The first half was largely uneventful in terms of footballing action, with Gray's 45 yard freekick for Palace in the 38th minute the only incident to come close, striking the crossbar. The second half was more lively, with Geoff Thomas scoring for Palace in the 66th minute with a diving header from a John Salako corner. Everton equalised quickly, with the Polish midfielder Robert Warzycha netting in the 69th minute. Neither side could finish the job in 90 minutes, and the game went to extra time.

Palace took the lead in the 101st minute when Ian Wright latched onto a long kick from goalkeeper Nigel Martyn to score. John Salako quickly made it three for Palace with a header in the 113th minute before Wright followed up quickly with his second and Palace's fourth in the 115th minute. At full-time Everton's goalkeeper Neville Southall refused to collect his medal, remaining on the pitch as his teammates climbed the Wembley steps to collect their runners-up medals.

=== Details ===
7 April 1991
15:00 BST

Crystal Palace	4–1 (a.e.t.)	Everton
Thomas 66'; Wright 101', 115'; Salako 113'	Report	Warzycha 69'

Wembley Stadium, London
Attendance: 52,460
Referee: George Courtney

Crystal Palace	Everton

GK	1	(England) Nigel Martyn
DF	2	(England) John Humphrey
DF	3	(England) Richard Shaw
DF	5	(Wales) Eric Young	(substituted off) 119'
DF	6	(England) Andy Thorn
MF	4	(England) Andy Gray	(substituted off) 54'
MF	7	(England) John Salako
MF	8	(England) Geoff Thomas (c)
FW	11	(England) Alan Pardew
FW	9	(England) Mark Bright
FW	10	(England) Ian Wright
Used substitutes:
MF	12	(Republic of Ireland) Eddie McGoldrick	(substituted on) 54'
FW	14	(England) Garry Thompson	(substituted on) 119'
Manager:
(England) Steve Coppell

GK	1	(Wales) Neville Southall
DF	2	(England) Neil McDonald
DF	3	(England) Andy Hinchcliffe
DF	4	(England) Martin Keown	(substituted off) 80'
DF	5	(England) Dave Watson
MF	6	(Republic of Ireland) Mike Milligan
MF	7	(Poland) Robert Warzycha
MF	8	(Scotland) Stuart McCall
MF	11	(Republic of Ireland) Kevin Sheedy
FW	9	(England) Mike Newell	(substituted off) 69'
FW	10	(England) Tony Cottee
Used substitutes:
DF	12	(Wales) Kevin Ratcliffe	(substituted on) 80'
MF	14	(Scotland) Pat Nevin	(substituted on) 69'
Manager:
(England) Howard Kendall
