= 1993 FA Charity Shield =

- The match programme cover
Arsenal	Manchester United
1	1
- Manchester United won 5–4 on penalties
- Date: 7 August 1993
- Venue: Wembley Stadium, London
- Man of the Match: Paul Ince (Manchester United)
- Referee: Gerald Ashby (Worcestershire)
- Attendance: 66,519
- Weather: Sunny

The 1993 Football Association Charity Shield was the 71st FA Charity Shield, an annual football match played between the winners of the previous season's Premier League and FA Cup competitions. It was held at Wembley Stadium on 7 August 1993. The match was played between Arsenal, who beat Sheffield Wednesday to win the 1993 FA Cup Final, and Manchester United, champions of the inaugural Premier League competition. Watched by a crowd of 66,519, Manchester United won the Shield 5–4 on penalties, after the match had finished at 1–1 after 90 minutes. This was the second edition to have penalties to decide the winners. The first being 1974 when Liverpool beat Leeds United on penalties.

This was Arsenal's 12th's Charity Shield appearance and Manchester United's 17th. The 1993 staging of the event was the first to feature players wearing permanent squad numbers; this became common practise in time for the 1993–94 season. Roy Keane made his debut for Manchester United in the match; he partnered Paul Ince in midfield. United began the match the brighter of the two teams and scored after eight minutes of play, through Mark Hughes. Striker Eric Cantona spurned two chances to extend United's lead, by which point Arsenal's midfield started to assert themselves. Five minutes before the interval, Ian Wright capitalised on a mistake by Ryan Giggs to score the equaliser. Arsenal started the second half strongly, which prompted Ferguson to tweak his formation and bring on Bryan Robson in place of Giggs. Eddie McGoldrick came on for his Arsenal debut in the 74th minute, and two minutes later, United were denied a penalty after Ince was brought down by John Jensen.

As there were no further goals, the match was decided by a penalty shoot-out. Wright and Denis Irwin missed their penalties; the decisive penalty, taken by Arsenal goalkeeper David Seaman, was saved by his opposite number, Peter Schmeichel. Arsenal manager George Graham admitted his surprise over how the game was decided and thought both clubs would share the trophy; his counterpart Alex Ferguson, though delighted with his team's victory, felt the sudden death aspect was unnecessary.

== Background ==
The FA Charity Shield was founded in 1908 as a contest between the top professional and amateur teams of each season. It was played between the Football League champions and FA Cup winners for the first time in 1921; the formation of a new top-tier division, the Premier League, in 1992 meant it displaced the Football League spot. Wembley Stadium acted as the home venue of the Shield, first hosting the event in 1974. The Arsenal players in the 1993 staging of the Charity Shield were the first in the competition's history to wear permanent squad numbers and names on the back of their shirts, while the Manchester United players used the traditional 1–11 numbering system without the names, which was phased out by the start of the 1993–94 FA Premier League season. The Premier League intended to introduce persistent squad numbers with names at the start of the 1992–93 season, but Manchester United vetoed plans as their laundry room "was too small to handle all the extra shirts".

Arsenal qualified for the 1993 FA Charity Shield by defeating Sheffield Wednesday in a replay match of the 1993 FA Cup Final to win the cup. The club therefore completed a domestic cup double; earlier in the season they beat Sheffield Wednesday 2–1 to win the 1993 Football League Cup Final. The other Charity Shield place went to Manchester United, winners of the inaugural Premier League competition. It was their first league title in 26 years and goalkeeper Peter Schmeichel felt the signing of striker Eric Cantona was a factor in the team's success: "He has added an element of surprise, imagination, inventiveness."

This was Manchester United's first appearance in the Charity Shield in three years; prior to this event they won 10 Shields outright (1908, 1911, 1952, 1956, 1957, 1983), shared four (1965, 1967, 1977, 1990) and lost three (1948, 1963, 1985). By contrast, Arsenal won seven previous Shields (1930, 1931, 1933, 1934, 1938, 1948, 1953), shared one with Tottenham Hotspur in 1991 and lost four (1935, 1936, 1979, 1989). Both clubs had only once met before in the Shield, when Arsenal won by four goals to three in 1948.

== Pre-match ==
Both managers approached the match with a view to win, in spite of the Shield's friendly feel. Arsenal manager George Graham opined "Winning is a good habit, so why not start early?" Graham lambasted those who found his team's playing style tedious: "The criticism that we don't pass the ball and we don't have flair is overdone. We won two championships and in the second lost one game out of 38." However, Manchester United manager Alex Ferguson said "Winning means keeping your job, and it can be a delicate situation. But I tell myself I'm not going to fail in this game." Ferguson spoke in glowing terms of new signing Roy Keane, a midfielder who gave United "unbelievable options, a real edge to the squad".

The match was scheduled for a 12:30pm kick off since Sky Sports televised the match in both Scotland and England; they were unable to pick an afternoon slot because of the television blackout, which aimed to protect Scottish attendances. UEFA warned The Football Association in the lead-up to the Charity Shield that a 3pm kick-off would result in a minimum fine of £5 million. Deryk Brown of The Sunday Times wrote of the decision: "So, at least, the season is beginning as it will go on, at the mercy of television." Tickets for the game were advertised at a cost of between £10 and £30.

== Match ==
=== Team selection ===
Arsenal lined up in a 4–4–2 formation; Eddie McGoldrick was included in the matchday squad, while Kevin Campbell partnered Ian Wright up front. Ferguson deployed a 4–2–4 formation, with Paul Ince partnering debutant Keane in the midfield two. Andrei Kanchelskis was picked in favour of Lee Sharpe on the right wing.

=== Summary ===
Manchester United began the first half the better of the two teams and led from the eighth minute. Denis Irwin's cross into Arsenal's penalty area found Eric Cantona on the right side; he lobbed the ball in Mark Hughes' direction, who was surrounded by the Arsenal defenders. Hughes instinctively made a connection with the ball with an overhead shot that beat goalkeeper David Seaman at the near post. United fashioned another chance to score moments after; Keane fed the ball to Cantona whose shot was blocked by Seaman. Kanchelskis created a further chance for Cantona; the Frenchman's effort once more was denied, this time by an Arsenal defender. "These proved costly misses", opined Patrick Barclay, given United's tempo weakened, and Arsenal's John Jensen and Paul Davis started to impose themselves in midfield. United captain Steve Bruce coped well against Campbell and Wright, but the latter striker equalised for Arsenal in the 40th minute. A loose pass from Ryan Giggs was headed-on by Davis and the ball fell to Wright. He, "some 20 yards out", hit the ball first time, which dipped past the underside of the crossbar.

A tackle by Ince on Lee Dixon left the Arsenal defender with a damaged ankle; he came off at half time and was replaced by Martin Keown. Arsenal's performance improved after Wright's goal; Paul Merson, a quiet figure in the first half, influenced their play in the second. Ferguson responded to Arsenal's newfound impetus by substituting Giggs for Bryan Robson. This tweaked United's formation to 4–3–3; in spite of Ince's well-rounded performance, his partner Keane started to tire as the game went on and United's game therefore suffered. Keane was shifted onto the right to accommodate Robson, who brought control to United's play. In the meantime, Nigel Winterburn prevented Cantona from scoring, following good play by Kanchelskis. Arsenal's service to Wright and Campbell was infrequent throughout the second half, but both players tested Schmeichel in goal. McGoldrick came on for his Arsenal debut in the 74th minute, a versatile player, able to "sweep, score from midfield or play wide". Two minutes later, Seaman denied Keane from scoring with a one-handed save. United continued to attack and a move was broken down after Jensen's tackle brought Ince down in the Arsenal's penalty area. Gerald Ashby refused to award a penalty – "the referee's decision otherwise was not supported by television replays".

No further goals meant the game was decided on a penalty shoot-out. The first four penalties were scored – Ince and Bruce for United and Winterburn and Jensen for Arsenal, before Seaman saved Irwin's effort. Wright missed his penalty, prompting jeers from the United supporters. The shoot-out proceeded to sudden death; Robson scored and Seaman "saw his gentle penalty saved by his opposite number" to give United a 5–4 win and thereby the Shield.

=== Details ===
7 August 1993
12:30 BST

Arsenal	1–1	Manchester United
Wright 40'		Hughes 8'
Penalties
Winterburn (penalty scored); Jensen (penalty scored); Campbell (penalty scored); Merson (penalty scored); Wright (penalty missed); Seaman (penalty missed)	4–5	(penalty scored) Ince; (penalty scored) Bruce; (penalty missed) Irwin; (penalty scored) Keane; (penalty scored) Cantona; (penalty scored) Robson

Wembley Stadium, London
Attendance: 66,519
Referee: Gerald Ashby (Worcestershire)

Arsenal	Manchester United

GK	1	(England) David Seaman
RB	2	(England) Lee Dixon	(substituted off) 46'
CB	5	(England) Andy Linighan
CB	6	(England) Tony Adams (c)
LB	3	(England) Nigel Winterburn
RM	15	(Sweden) Anders Limpar	(substituted off) 74'
CM	4	(England) Paul Davis
CM	17	(Denmark) John Jensen
LM	10	(England) Paul Merson
CF	7	(England) Kevin Campbell
CF	8	(England) Ian Wright
Substitutes:
GK	13	(England) Alan Miller
DF	14	(England) Martin Keown	(substituted on) 46'
MF	11	(Republic of Ireland) Eddie McGoldrick	(substituted on) 74'
MF	22	(England) Ian Selley
MF	25	(England) Neil Heaney
Manager:
(Scotland) George Graham

GK	1	(Denmark) Peter Schmeichel
RB	2	(England) Paul Parker
CB	4	(England) Steve Bruce (c)
CB	6	(England) Gary Pallister
LB	3	(Republic of Ireland) Denis Irwin
RM	5	(Russia) Andrei Kanchelskis
CM	9	(Republic of Ireland) Roy Keane
CM	8	(England) Paul Ince
LM	11	(Wales) Ryan Giggs	(substituted off) 68'
CF	7	(France) Eric Cantona
CF	10	(Wales) Mark Hughes
Substitutes:
GK	13	(England) Les Sealey
MF	12	(England) Bryan Robson	(substituted on) 68'
MF	15	(Scotland) Darren Ferguson
MF	16	(England) Lee Sharpe
FW	14	(Scotland) Brian McClair
Manager:
(Scotland) Alex Ferguson

Man of the match

- Paul Ince (Manchester United)

Match officials

- Assistant referees:
  - Graham Barber (Hertfordshire)
  - John Norbury (Essex)

Match rules

- 90 minutes
- Penalty shoot-out if scores level
- Five named substitutes, of which three may be used

== Post-match ==
The Charity Shield was presented to Bruce by former Arsenal manager Billy Wright. Wright died barely a year later, aged 70. Graham assumed both clubs would share the trophy, so when it came to a penalty shoot-out he entrusted his players to decide their order. He described Wright's goal as "brilliant" and felt it was "unfortunate" that Seaman missed: "For a goalkeeper, he normally takes great penalties. He normally hits them hard but he decided to try and place this one and it didn't work." Wright was unashamed of his penalty miss, "...just as long as I don't do it when it is important".

Ferguson remarked the Shield should not have been settled on penalties; to him it was a "celebration of success", though ultimately he was delighted his team won. He was pleased with the team's start – "I thought in the first 25 minutes we were really good and could have tied the match up then" – and considered lining the team up in a 4–3–3 formation to begin with, though wanted to see "how Keane played with Ince, what the balance was like". Ince believed he should have been awarded a penalty after Jensen fouled him: "I was past their last man and there was no way I would have dived from there."

== See also ==
- Arsenal F.C.–Manchester United F.C. rivalry
