= Ron Noades =

English football club owner (1937–2013)

Personal information
- Full name: Ronald Geoffrey Noades
- Date of birth: 22 June 1937
- Place of birth: London, United Kingdom
- Date of death: 24 December 2013 (aged 76)
- Place of death: Purley, London, United Kingdom

Managerial career
- Years: Team
- 1998: Crystal Palace (caretaker)
- 1998–2000: Brentford

Ronald Geoffrey Noades (22 June 1937 – 24 December 2013) was an English businessman, best known for his investments in football clubs. He was the chairman of Southall, Wimbledon, Crystal Palace and finally Brentford. He was also the manager of Brentford from 1998 to 2000, and led the club to the Third Division championship in 1999.

== Football club ownership ==
=== Southall ===
The first club owned by Noades was non-league Southall.

=== Wimbledon ===
Noades then took over Wimbledon, who were elected to the Football League in 1977. They won promotion from the Fourth Division in only their second season as a Football League club, although they were relegated after just one season. He then entered tentative talks with the Milton Keynes Development Corporation with a view to relocating the club to the new town some 70 miles away in Buckinghamshire, but nothing came of this. Ironically, Wimbledon would ultimately be relocated to Milton Keynes more than 20 years later.

Noades remained chairman of Wimbledon until 1981, when the club won a second promotion to the Third Division. Just before departing, he appointed Dave Bassett as manager – a move which would bring the club great success.

=== Crystal Palace ===
As Crystal Palace chairman, he led them through their brightest period, which included promotion to the old First Division (1989), an FA Cup final (1990), a third-placed finish in the First Division (1991), and winning the Full Members Cup (also in 1991). He took the club over just after their relegation from the First Division in 1981, and after three difficult seasons where they narrowly avoided dropping into the Third Division, the turning point came in May 1984 when he appointed the former Manchester United and England winger Steve Coppell as manager following his retirement from playing through injury.

In 1985–86, Palace fell just short of promotion to the First Division, but they had just added striker Ian Wright from non-league Greenwich Borough to their ranks, and then signed striker Mark Bright from Leicester City to create what was one of the most prolific strikeforces in the club's history. Promotion finally occurred in 1989, and a year later Palace took Manchester United to a replay in the final of the FA Cup before a narrow defeat. They finished third in the league a year later.

In 1991, Noades provoked controversy with his comments on the racial make-up of his team: "The black players at this club lend the side a lot of skill and flair, but you also need white players in there to balance things up and give the team some brains and some common sense." The fall-out led to several black players leaving the club, including key players Ian Wright, Mark Bright and Andy Gray.

Palace were relegated from the Premier League in 1993 at the end of its first season, but were promoted a year later, only to go down again after just one season, during which they were semi-finalists in both domestic cups. Promotion was achieved for the third time in less than a decade in 1997, but again Palace were relegated after just one season.

In 1998, Noades sold his interest in Palace to recruitment tycoon Mark Goldberg for £22,000,000 (although Noades actually lent Goldberg £5,000,000 of this, as he could not afford it). Despite being advised against purchasing the club by Noades' own accountants, Goldberg continued with the negotiations. Noades had offered the club for £9m to a consortium of Kent and Surrey businessmen the previous year. The fee included the club and its players' contracts, but not Selhurst Park, Palace's home ground. As the club prepared for relegation from the Premier League, Noades acted as caretaker manager, after the appointment of Attilio Lombardo and Tomas Brolin failed to save Palace from relegation. Head coach Terry Venables took over management of the team following Noades departure from the club that summer.

With the sale of club completed, Goldberg's financiers withdrew their interest, and he found himself in debt to Noades. The club went through a subsequent administration, which lasted until 2000.

=== Brentford ===
After leaving Palace he became chairman and subsequently also first team manager of recently-relegated Division Three side Brentford from July 1998 and took the side back to Division Two at the first time of asking. He ended both roles in 2000 and sold his majority shareholding in the club to supporters group Bees United in January 2006. Noades' loans to the club were repaid by current owner Matthew Benham in 2007.

== Ownership of Selhurst Park ==
Former Crystal Palace chairman Simon Jordan made public his intentions to either purchase and re-develop Selhurst Park, or move to a new stadium. However, Noades announced in April 2006 that Jordan had not made any offers for the stadium, and that he had no intention of selling the stadium, either. Nonetheless, in October 2006, Jordan announced he had purchased the freehold of the stadium site four days previously for £12m, using an investment mechanism that kept his identity secret. It later turned out that this was incorrect and the freehold was owned by companies under the control of Paul Kemsley. Jordan announced in April 2008 that he had secured the football club a 25-year lease for Selhurst Park Stadium together with the option to purchase the freehold within that period.

Unbeknownst to Jordan, Ron Noades and Paul Kemsley knew each other and Noades was fully aware of what Jordan was doing prior to agreeing to the sale. Noades in fact wrote to Jordan prior to accepting the offer through Kemsley's investment group and offered him the Stadium for the same price. Jordan never replied and so Kemsley was allowed to purchase Selhurst Park.

== Business interests ==
Noades owned several golf courses in south-east England. Known as the Altonwood Group, it includes Surrey National Golf Club (formerly Happy Valley), Westerham Golf Club, The Addington Golf Club, Woldingham Golf Club (formerly Dukes Dene) and Godstone Golf Club (on a site formerly used as Crystal Palace's training ground).

== Death ==
Noades, who was a non-smoker, died from lung cancer on 24 December 2013 in Purley, London. He was 76.

== Honours ==
Brentford

- Football League Third Division: 1998–99

Business positions
Preceded by Raymond Bloye	Crystal Palace chairman 1980–1998	Succeeded by Mark Goldberg
Preceded by Tony Swaisland	Brentford chairman 1998–2000	Succeeded by Eddie Rogers
