= Salako (disambiguation) =

Salako is a hat worn in French Antilles. Salako or Selako may also refer to

- Salako language, a dialect of Kendayan language spoken in Borneo
- Selako people, an ethnic of the Dayak people group from Borneo
- Sàlàkọ́, a list of people with the name Sàlàkọ́ or Salako
- Salako, a defunct band signed with Jeepster Records
