= Sàlàkọ́ =

Nigerian Given Name

Origin
- Language: Yoruba
- Origin: Yoruba
- Meaning: To Hang White Clothe
- Region of origin: South West

Sàlàkọ́ or Salako audio is a Nigerian male given name and surname of Yoruba origin. It means "Hang a white cloth (of Ọbàtálá)." They are usually from devotees of Ọbàtálá, the deity of creation and creativity.

== People ==
- Andy Salako (born 1972), Nigerian football defender
- John Salako (born 1969), English footballer and sports television personality
- Lateef Akinola Salako (1935–2017), Nigerian academic
