= Paul Warhurst =

English footballer

Personal information
- Date of birth: 26 September 1969 (age 57)
- Place of birth: Stockport, England
- Positions: Defender; midfielder; forward

Youth career
- Manchester City

Senior career*
Years	Team	Apps	(Gls)
1987–1988	Manchester City	0	(0)
1988–1991	Oldham Athletic	67	(2)
1991–1993	Sheffield Wednesday	88	(18)
1993–1997	Blackburn Rovers	57	(4)
1997–1998	Crystal Palace	27	(4)
1998–2003	Bolton Wanderers	91	(0)
2003	→ Stoke City (loan)	5	(1)
2003	Chesterfield	4	(0)
2003	Barnsley	4	(0)
2004	Carlisle United	1	(0)
2004	Grimsby Town	7	(0)
2004	Blackpool	4	(0)
2005	Forest Green Rovers	6	(2)
2005	Wrexham	11	(1)
2006–2007	Barnet	28	(0)
2007	Northwich Victoria	2	(0)
Total		380	(32)

International career
1990–1991	England U21	8	(0)

Managerial career
- 2007: Northwich Victoria (caretaker)
- * Club domestic league appearances and goals

Paul Warhurst (born 26 September 1969) is an English former professional footballer who played as a defender, midfielder or striker.

Warhurst notably played in the Premier League for Sheffield Wednesday, Blackburn Rovers, Crystal Palace and Bolton Wanderers. He was part of the Wednesday team who finished as FA Cup and Football League Cup runners-up in 1993, and was a Rovers player when they won the title in 1995. Prior to this he had come through the youth ranks at Manchester City and later went on to play in the Football League for Stoke City, Chesterfield, Barnsley, Carlisle United, Grimsby Town, Blackpool, Wrexham and Barnet. He also played Non-league football for Forest Green Rovers and Northwich Victoria.

In 2007 Warhurst was appointed caretaker manager of Northwich but passed at the job on a full-time basis, he has since worked in the sport as a football consultant and runs his own sports management agency.

== Playing career ==
=== Manchester City ===
Warhurst began his career as a trainee at Manchester City in 1988, he was added to the club's first team squad at the beginning of the 1988–89 season, but never played for the first team

=== Oldham Athletic ===
He joined Oldham Athletic for a fee of £10,000 in the autumn of 1988, just after his 19th birthday. There he became a first team regular, featuring in the team's memorable run to the semi-finals of the 1989-90 FA Cup. After 86 appearances (scoring twice), he began to capture the eye of bigger clubs and the 1990–91 season was his final season for the club.

=== Sheffield Wednesday ===
Sheffield Wednesday came in for Warhurst in the summer of 1991, for £750,000. He began his career at the club as a solid defender, but midway through his second season, injuries to David Hirst and Mark Bright saw Warhurst deployed as an emergency striker. In a phenomenal sequence, he scored 12 goals in as many games, and after four years as a defender, was called up to the injury-hit England national team as a striker. Warhurst was injured, however, and missed an opportunity to win his first cap. His scoring ratio inevitably slowed down, and when Hirst returned to action, Warhurst fell out with manager Trevor Francis, who wanted the player to return to defensive duties but Warhurst only wanted to be a striker now. In the summer of 1993, Warhurst was transfer-listed and left the club after the start of the following season, having scored 18 goals in 88 games for the Owls. Whilst at Wednesday, Warhurst played in both the 1993 League Cup Final as a striker, and the 1993 FA Cup Final as a centre back, due to David Hirst returning from injury and defenders Nigel Pearson and Phil King absent.

=== Blackburn Rovers ===
Following his departure from Sheffield Wednesday, Warhurst signed for Blackburn for £2.7 million. Ironically, he played in a new position for Rovers and was primarily a midfielder. He did, however, play occasionally as a forward. While at Ewood Park, Warhurst was part of the most successful squad in the club's recent history. He played amongst the likes of Alan Shearer, Chris Sutton, Tim Flowers, Colin Hendry, Henning Berg and Graeme Le Saux and won a Premier League winners' medal in the 1994–95 season, as Rovers beat rivals Manchester United to the title. The following season, Rovers struggled to maintain their form and Manchester United regained the title, finishing ahead of Newcastle United. Blackburn could only manage to finish in 7th place. The following season saw the club finish in the bottom half of the league down in 13th, as the club initially seemed to struggle following the loss of Shearer to Newcastle United. In the summer of 1997, after 74 games for Blackburn (yielding four goals), Warhurst left Blackburn.

=== Crystal Palace ===
Warhurst made a switch to Crystal Palace for the 1997–98 season, as the club had recently earned promotion back to the top flight. Palace suffered relegation, though, in their first season back since 1995, but Warhurst remained with the club despite losing their status as a Premier League club. He made 30 appearances, scoring four times, before being loaned to Bolton Wanderers in November 1998.

=== Bolton Wanderers ===
Following a successful spell at Bolton, this led to the Lancashire team signing him permanently for £800,000 in January 1999. Warhurst became an integral part of The Trotters midfield, and In 2000–01 he helped Bolton gain promotion to the Premier League under Sam Allardyce. After promotion Warhurst initially kept his place in the team, despite having regular injuries. Other players such as Youri Djorkaeff were signed and in the end, even if Warhurst was fit, he struggled to break into the first team. Stoke City signed Warhurst on loan from Bolton for two months in the close of the 2002–03 season, where he scored once against Rotherham United. At the end of the season Warhurst was released by Sam Allardyce after 100 club appearances. After failing to find another club, Bolton briefly re-signed Warhurst in September 2003. However, he made no more appearances for the club and was released again in October.

=== Later career ===
In October 2003, Warhurst signed a short-term deal for Second Division side Chesterfield and made his debut in a 3–0 home victory over Swindon Town. However, after only playing 6 times and scoring one goal against Lincoln City in the League Trophy he was released from his monthly rolling contract after only playing for the club for 4 weeks.

His next port of call was to link up with fellow Second Division side Barnsley. He made his club debut in the Yorkshire derby against his former club Sheffield Wednesday. In a 1–1 draw, Warhurst was sent off against the club where he arguably made a name for himself. Following the completion of three other league games, Barnsley also opted to release the veteran player from his contract.

In February 2004 Warhurst joined Division Three relegation strugglers Carlisle United on non-contract terms. He played in the club's 1–1 away draw with Macclesfield Town and after the game he left the club due to the amount of time he would need to travel.

In March 2004, he was signed by new Grimsby Town manager Nicky Law, as well as a wave of new players brought to the club to stave off the threat of relegation. In his debut after playing well all game, he headed into his own net to give AFC Bournemouth a 1–1 draw at Blundell Park. Warhurst was used as a forward, midfielder and a centre back for The Mariners, who eventually released him at the end of the season after playing in 7 games.

Following his release from Grimsby in the summer, Warhurst struggled to find himself a new club, until landing a short-term deal with Blackpool following a successful trial. Warhurst managed to stay with the club for 3 months, playing 6 times in that period until he was released yet again.

In April 2005 he moved to have his first taste of Non League football, having signed a one-month contract with Conference club Forest Green Rovers. He played in the club's final 6 games of the season before leaving the club at the close of the 2004–05 season.

In August 2005 he moved back into The Football League and signed for Welsh side Wrexham, where he added experience to their otherwise young side. He managed to play in 13 games for the club, scoring once against Barnet, before being released in March 2006.

Upon his release from Wrexham, Warhurst signed a short-term deal with fellow League Two side Barnet, adding much needed experience to his new club, who were managed by Paul Fairclough. Warhurst played out the remainder of the 2005–06 season for the club, and was given a one-year deal for the following season. Warhurst managed to chalk up 23 games in all competitions during the 2006–07 season and completed his first full season for one club only since playing for Bolton Wanderers in the 2001–02 season. This had ended a spell of moving from club to club during the season since his release by The Trotters in the summer of 2003.

== Coaching career ==
Warhurst was released by Barnet following the conclusion of the 2006–07 season. In September 2007 he joined Northwich Victoria and on 17 September took over as caretaker manager following Neil Redfearn's resignation. Despite initially being favourite to be permanent manager, he left the club before the appointment was decided. Warhurst has since retired from football.

== Personal life ==
Warhurst now runs his own football consultancy company, named "PW Football Consultants". He is also a director of sports management agency "Stone Mountain Management". Notable players that Warhurst has helped during his time as a football consultant are Callum McManaman, Jon Walters and Ben Mee.

== Career statistics ==
Appearances and goals by club, season and competition
Club	Season	League			FA Cup		League Cup		Other^{[A]}		Total	
Club	Season	Division	Apps	Goals	Apps	Goals	Apps	Goals	Apps	Goals	Apps	Goals
Oldham Athletic	1988–89	Second Division	4	0	1	0	0	0	1	0	6	0
Oldham Athletic	1989–90	Second Division	30	1	6	0	6	0	0	0	42	1
Oldham Athletic	1990–91	Second Division	33	1	2	0	2	0	1	0	38	1
Oldham Athletic	Total		67	2	9	0	8	0	2	0	86	2
Sheffield Wednesday	1991–92	First Division	33	0	1	0	2	0	1	0	37	0
Sheffield Wednesday	1992–93	Premier League	29	6	7	5	7	4	4	3	47	18
Sheffield Wednesday	1993–94	Premier League	4	0	0	0	0	0	0	0	4	0
Sheffield Wednesday	Total		66	6	8	5	9	4	5	3	88	18
Blackburn Rovers	1993–94	Premier League	9	0	0	0	1	0	0	0	10	0
Blackburn Rovers	1994–95	Premier League	27	2	2	0	4	0	0	0	33	2
Blackburn Rovers	1995–96	Premier League	10	0	0	0	3	0	5	0	18	0
Blackburn Rovers	1996–97	Premier League	11	2	1	0	0	0	0	0	12	2
Blackburn Rovers	Total		57	4	3	0	8	0	5	0	73	4
Crystal Palace	1997–98	Premier League	22	3	1	0	1	0	0	0	24	3
Crystal Palace	1998–99	First Division	5	1	0	0	1	0	0	0	6	1
Crystal Palace	Total		27	4	1	0	2	0	0	0	30	4
Bolton Wanderers	1998–99	First Division	20	0	0	0	0	0	2	0	22	0
Bolton Wanderers	1999–2000	First Division	19	0	2	0	4	0	2	0	27	0
Bolton Wanderers	2000–01	First Division	20	0	2	0	1	0	0	0	23	0
Bolton Wanderers	2001–02	Premier League	25	0	0	0	1	0	0	0	26	0
Bolton Wanderers	2002–03	Premier League	7	0	1	0	0	0	0	0	8	0
Bolton Wanderers	Total		91	0	5	0	6	0	4	0	106	0
Stoke City (loan)	2002–03	First Division	5	1	0	0	0	0	0	0	5	1
Chesterfield	2003–04	Second Division	4	0	1	0	0	0	1	1	6	1
Barnsley	2003–04	Second Division	4	0	0	0	0	0	0	0	4	0
Carlisle United	2003–04	Third Division	1	0	0	0	0	0	0	0	1	0
Grimsby Town	2003–04	Second Division	7	0	0	0	0	0	0	0	7	0
Blackpool	2004–05	League One	4	0	1	0	0	0	1	0	6	0
Forest Green Rovers	2004–05	Conference National	6	2	0	0	0	0	0	0	6	2
Wrexham	2005–06	League Two	11	1	0	0	1	0	0	0	12	1
Barnet	2005–06	League Two	9	0	0	0	0	0	0	0	9	0
Barnet	2006–07	League Two	19	0	1	0	2	0	1	0	23	0
Northwich Victoria	2007–08	Conference National	2	0	0	0	0	0	0	0	2	0
Career Total			380	20	29	5	36	4	19	4	464	33

A. The "Other" column constitutes appearances and goals in the Football League Trophy, Football League play-offs, Full Members Cup UEFA Champions League, and UEFA Cup.

== Honours ==
Oldham Athletic

- Football League Second Division: 1990–91
- Football League Cup runner-up: 1989–90

Sheffield Wednesday

- FA Cup runner-up: 1992–93
- Football League Cup runner-up: 1992–93

Blackburn Rovers

- Premier League: 1994–95
