= Hayden Groves =

English chef (born 1974)

- Born: 21 July 1974 (age 51); Hertford, Hertfordshire
- Education: Hertford Regional College
- Culinary career
- Cooking style: European cuisine
- Awards won: National Chef of The year 2013; Foodservice Catey Chef of the Year 2015

Hayden Kain Groves (born 21 July 1974) is an English chef and amateur cyclist. He is the author of the Cure Leukaemia Charity cook book Back in the Saddle and won the title of National Chef of the Year in 2013.

== Career ==
Groves started his kitchen career as a kitchen porter, aged 15. He worked in a number of small local restaurants and hotels, at the same time studying at Hertford Regional College earning two City & Guilds qualifications.

He had stints at Hanbury Manor, under Rory Thompson and Le Manoir aux Quat' Saisons before moving to Tesco head office to cook for the Chairman Ian MacLaurin.

In 2004, he took on a role as executive chef for Lloyd's of London an insurance market located in the City of London. During an eight-year tenure, he was in charge of four kitchens and cooked for several members of the royal family including Queen Elizabeth II in an event for the British Red Cross in 2005.

In 2012, Groves joined Foodservice provider BaxterStorey. He has since cooked for senior executives in the banking world, including Bob Diamond at Barclays and Lloyd Blankfein of Goldman Sachs.

In 2013 Groves was awarded National chef of the Year, whose previous winners included Gordon Ramsay and Mark Sargeant.

In 2015 he was awarded The Caterer foodservice Chef Catey at The Catey Awards.

Since 2012 he is also a consultant and resident demonstration chef at Borough Market and sits as a London board member of the industry benevolent charity Hospitality Action.

In 2020 Hayden set up his own consultancy business Hayden Groves Consultancy.

== Book ==
Back in the Saddle (2017), is the 280-page coffee-table book Groves wrote to accompany the Three Tour Charity Challenge by publisher Anthony Hodgson of Face Publications. 100% of the proceeds from the sale of the book go to CureLeukaemia.

Back in the Saddle by Hayden Groves represented the UK at the prestigious Gourmand World Cookbook Awards. The ceremony which took place in Yantai, China May 25–28, 2018; saw the book crowned 'Best in the World' in both the Sports Nutrition and Charity Fundraising categories.

The Gourmand World Cookbook Awards, aka the Oscars of the cookbook awards, were founded in 1995 by Edouard Cointreau. Every year the Awards honour the best food and wine books. Books from 205 countries participate in these prestigious awards, the largest international cookbook competition in the world.

== Personal life ==
Groves has two daughters: Keira and Elsie. He was an amateur cyclist who raced at a regional and national level in his teens and twenties.

In 2015, he took on the Tour de France route one day before the professionals to help raise money for blood cancer charity Cureleukaemia.

In 2017, Groves rode all three Grand Tour routes as part of a team of five, including Geoff Thomas one day before the professional peloton – the Giro d'Italia, Tour de France and the Vuelta a España; a total distance of 10,403km which helped raise further funds for the expansion of the Birmingham Centre of Clinical Haematology which opened in January 2018.
In recognition of his fundraising Groves was made a Patron of the charity Cure Leukaemia in 2019.

He was a member of the Tour 21 group of 18 amateur cyclists that completed all 21 stages of the 3,400km 2021 Tour de France route, one week ahead of the professionals. The team, led by former England footballer and blood cancer survivor Geoff Thomas, raised over £1m in total for Cure Leukaemia with Groves seeing his personal fundraising exceed £215,000
