= 1993 Football League Cup final =

- Event: 1992–93 Football League Cup
Arsenal	Sheffield Wednesday
2	1
- Date: 18 April 1993
- Venue: Wembley Stadium, London
- Man of the Match: Paul Merson (Arsenal)
- Referee: Allan Gunn
- Attendance: 74,007

The 1993 Football League Cup final took place on 18 April 1993 at Wembley Stadium, and was played between Arsenal and Sheffield Wednesday. Arsenal won 2–1 in normal time, in what was the first of three Wembley finals between the two sides that season; Arsenal and Wednesday also met in the FA Cup final of that year (which went to a replay), the first time ever in English football.

The match was the first match in which any European clubs had used squad numbers and player names on their shirts. On this occasion, as in the FA Cup final and replay that year, players wore individual numbers which were retained for the FA Cup finals. Coincidentally, the first occurrence of players wearing numbered shirts came on 25 August 1928, when Arsenal and Chelsea wore numbered shirts in their matches against The Wednesday (renamed Sheffield Wednesday soon after) and Swansea Town, respectively. Squad numbers became compulsory for Premier League clubs from August 1993.

In the game, Wednesday's John Harkes scored the opener in the eighth minute, before Paul Merson equalised for Arsenal. Merson then set up Steve Morrow for the winner. In the celebrations after the match, Arsenal skipper Tony Adams attempted to pick up Morrow and parade him on his shoulders, but Adams slipped and Morrow awkwardly hit the ground resulting in him breaking his arm and being rushed straight to hospital. Unable to receive his winner's medal on the day, he was eventually presented with it before the start of the FA Cup final the following month.

As of 2026, this is the most recent League Cup final for Wednesday and most recent competition triumph for Arsenal.

== Match details ==
18 April 1993
17:00 BST

Arsenal	2–1	Sheffield Wednesday
Merson 20'; Morrow 68'		Harkes 8'

Wembley Stadium, London
Attendance: 74,007
Referee: Allan Gunn (Sussex)

Arsenal	Sheffield Wednesday

GK	1	(England) David Seaman
DF	22	(Republic of Ireland) David O'Leary
DF	6	(England) Tony Adams (c)
DF	5	(England) Andy Linighan
DF	3	(England) Nigel Winterburn
MF	11	(England) Ray Parlour
MF	15	(Northern Ireland) Steve Morrow
MF	14	(England) Paul Davis
MF	10	(England) Paul Merson
FW	8	(England) Ian Wright
FW	7	(England) Kevin Campbell
Substitutes:
MF	4	(England) Ian Selley
FW	9	(England) Alan Smith
Manager:
(Scotland) George Graham

GK	1	(England) Chris Woods
DF	2	(Sweden) Roland Nilsson
DF	16	(England) Phil King		(substituted off) 83'
DF	4	(England) Carlton Palmer	Yellow card
DF	6	(England) Viv Anderson (c)
MF	15	(United States) John Harkes
MF	7	(Northern Ireland) Danny Wilson		(substituted off) 74'
MF	8	(England) Chris Waddle
FW	9	(England) Paul Warhurst
FW	10	(England) Mark Bright	Yellow card
MF	11	(Republic of Ireland) John Sheridan
Substitutes:
MF	17	(England) Graham Hyde		(substituted on) 83'
FW	5	(England) David Hirst		(substituted on) 74'
Manager:
(England) Trevor Francis

Match rules:
90 minutes
30 minutes extra-time if necessary
Replay if scores still level
Two named substitutes, both of whom may be used

== Route to the final ==
=== Arsenal ===
Round 2, 1st Leg: Millwall 1–1 Campbell at Highbury

Round 2, 2nd Leg: 1–1 Campbell at The Old Den (Arsenal win 3–1 on penalties)

Round 3: Derby County 1–1 Campbell at Baseball Ground

Round 3 Replay: 2–1 Campbell, Wright at Highbury

Round 4: Scarborough 1–0 Winterburn at McCain Stadium

Round 5: Nottingham Forest 2–0 Wright (2) at Highbury

Semi-final, 1st Leg: Crystal Palace 3–1 Smith (2), Wright at Selhurst Park

Semi-final, 2nd Leg: 2–0 Linighan, Wright at Highbury

=== Sheffield Wednesday ===
Round 2, 1st Leg: Hartlepool United 3–0 Bright, Watson, Wilson at Hillsborough Stadium

Round 2, 2nd Leg: 2–2 Bright, Warhurst at Victoria Park

Round 3: Leicester City 7–1 Bart-Williams, Bright (2), Hirst, Watson (2), Worthington at Hillsborough Stadium

Round 4: QPR 4–0 Bright, Hirst, Nilsson, Palmer at Hillsborough Stadium

Round 5: Ipswich Town 1–1 John Sheridan at Portman Road

Round 5 Replay 1–0 Warhurst at Hillsborough Stadium

Semi-final, 1st Leg: Blackburn Rovers 4–2 Harkes, John Sheridan, Warhurst (2) at Ewood Park

Semi-final, 2nd Leg: 2–1 Bright, Hirst at Hillsborough Stadium
