= Eddie McGoldrick =

English football coach (born 1965)

Personal information
- Full name: Edward John Paul McGoldrick
- Date of birth: 30 April 1965 (age 61)
- Place of birth: Islington, England
- Height: 1.78 m (5 ft 10 in)
- Positions: Winger; central midfielder

Team information
- Current team: Crystal Palace (academy head coach)

Senior career*
Years	Team	Apps	(Gls)
1981–1984	Kettering Town	110	(9)
1984–1986	Nuneaton Borough	81	(4)
1986–1988	Northampton Town	107	(9)
1988–1993	Crystal Palace	147	(11)
1993–1996	Arsenal	38	(0)
1996	→ Manchester City (loan)	5	(0)
1996–1999	Manchester City	34	(0)
1998	→ Stockport County (loan)	2	(0)
2000	Corby Town	0	(0)
Total		352	(22)

International career^{‡}
1992–1995	Republic of Ireland	15	(0)
1992	Republic of Ireland B	1	(0)

Managerial career
- 2000: Corby Town (player-manager)
- 2003: Bashley
- 2009–2012: Northampton Town (youth team)
- 2013–2014: Crystal Palace (youth team)
- 2014–: Crystal Palace (academy)
- * Club domestic league appearances and goals as of 29 December 2016 ‡ National team caps and goals as of 29 December 2016

Edward John Paul McGoldrick (born 30 April 1965) is an English football coach and former professional footballer who is the foundation academy manager of Premier League club Crystal Palace.

As a player he was a winger and central midfielder, who played in the Football League for Northampton Town, Crystal Palace, Manchester City and Stockport County, and in the Premier League for Arsenal. He also played non-League football for Kettering Town, Nuneaton Borough and Corby Town. McGoldrick was capped for the Republic of Ireland and played in World Cup 94.

== Club career ==
McGoldrick started out at non-league side Kettering Town, but following a transfer to Nuneaton Borough he established himself as a utility player in the early 1980s. He went on to move into the Football League with Northampton Town, where he collected a Fourth Division title medal in 1987.

McGoldrick then went on to have a spell at Crystal Palace. Whilst with Palace he played in the 1988–89 Second Division playoff final. During the game he supplied the cross which set up Ian Wright's goal which secured promotion to the First Division in Palace's 4–3 aggregate victory over Blackburn Rovers. He also won a Zenith Data Systems Cup winners medal with the club in the 1990–91 season. During that season, Palace also recorded their best-ever finish of third place within the league. He did however, miss out on the club's appearance in the 1990 FA Cup final. All in all with Crystal Palace he played 147 matches, scoring 11 goals.

McGoldrick moved to Arsenal after Crystal Palace's relegation from the Premier League in 1993. At Arsenal, he linked up with Wright once again, making his debut in the Charity Shield against Manchester United on 7 August 1993. He played a total of 38 games in the 1993–94 season, which included a substitute appearance in Arsenal's European Cup Winners' Cup final win over Parma. McGoldrick was thereafter less of a regular due to the arrival of players like Glenn Helder. He was also known for taking Arsenal's corner kicks with an unorthodox 'looping' style, by lofting the ball high into the air before it dropped in the penalty area. In all he played 57 times for Arsenal, scoring one goal; his goal coming in the 1993–94 European Cup Winners' Cup against Standard Liège.

He left Arsenal for Manchester City in the autumn of 1996. The move was initially on loan, becoming permanent on 18 October 1996 following a £300,000 transfer. McGoldrick joined the club amid a whirlwind of managerial changes. Initially signed on loan by caretaker-manager Asa Hartford (who took over from Alan Ball), his permanent move was the only signing of Steve Coppell's 32-day reign, and he played under two more managers before the end of the season. McGoldrick spent two seasons with City, but was consigned to the reserves for much of his final season at the club, a loan spell at Stockport County providing his only first-team action for 1998.

He stayed on the payroll at Manchester City until retiring as a player in 1999.

== International career ==
McGoldrick was capped at international level for the Republic of Ireland. He was a member of Ireland's 1994 World Cup squad though he did not play in the tournament.

== Coaching career ==
After retiring as a player, McGoldrick had short spells as manager of Corby Town in 2000 and Bashley in 2003.

Prior to becoming player-manager at Corby Town he had a brief spell as the club's commercial manager. In 2008, he was confirmed as the under-14s manager at Northampton Town. During the following year he stepped up to become manager of the club's youth team.

However, after a spell at Northampton, McGoldrick's old club Crystal Palace sought to appoint him as one of their youth team managers in 2013. However, in that year he instead established a football academy at Northampton College. Wherein the college students aged 16 – 19 years old have the opportunity of pursuing a full-time footballing scholarship along with a BTEC Sport qualification. At the start of the 2016–17 season, McGoldrick was again offered by Crystal Palace a post with the club's Academy. McGoldrick accepted and took up the position as the manager of the club's academy.

== Novelty song ==
Josh Widdicombe fronted the 1990s football podcast Quickly Kevin, Will He Score? and released a song featuring McGoldrick's name being sung to a jaunty tune, a running joke on the podcast. The aim was to get to Xmas number one in 2019. However, the single failed to break the top 40.

== Honours ==
Northampton Town

- Football League Fourth Division: 1986–87

Crystal Palace

- Football League Second Division play-offs: 1989
- Full Members' Cup: 1990–91

Arsenal

- UEFA Cup Winners' Cup: 1993–94

Individual

- Crystal Palace Player of the Year: 1991–92

== See also ==
- List of Republic of Ireland international footballers born outside the Republic of Ireland
