= Gary O'Reilly =

English footballer (born 1961)

Personal information
- Full name: Gary Mills O'Reilly
- Date of birth: 21 March 1961 (age 65)
- Place of birth: Isleworth, England
- Height: 5 ft 11 in (1.80 m)
- Position: Defender

Youth career
- 19??–1979: Grays Athletic

Senior career*
Years	Team	Apps	(Gls)
1979–1984	Tottenham Hotspur	45	(0)
1984–1987	Brighton & Hove Albion	79	(3)
1987–1991	Crystal Palace	70	(2)
1991	→ Birmingham City (loan)	1	(0)
1991–1992	Brighton & Hove Albion	28	(3)
Total		223	(8)
- * Club domestic league appearances and goals

Gary Mills O'Reilly (born 21 March 1961) is an English former professional footballer who played in the Football League for Tottenham Hotspur, Brighton & Hove Albion, Crystal Palace and Birmingham City as a central defender.

== Life and career ==
O'Reilly was born in Isleworth, now part of Greater London. He played for Grays Athletic before turning professional with Tottenham Hotspur in 1979, and made his debut the following year. After 45 League games for the club, he joined Brighton & Hove Albion for a £45,000 fee. He stayed with Brighton for two and a half seasons before moving on to Crystal Palace. He scored in the 1989–90 FA Cup semi-final as Palace beat Liverpool 4–3 after extra time, and then scored the opening goal in the final, against Manchester United. The match ended in a 3–3 draw, and Palace lost replay 1–0 five days later.

After a brief spell on loan at Birmingham City, O'Reilly rejoined Brighton & Hove Albion in January 1991. Brighton finished that season sixth in the Second Division and reached the playoff final, where they were beaten by Notts County. Any hopes of another promotion challenge the following season – and of a place in the new FA Premier League – were quickly forgotten as Brighton found themselves fighting a battle against relegation which was eventually lost. O'Reilly then retired from playing.

Following his retirement from football, he made a career in sports broadcasting. He has appeared on BBC Radio 5 Live's Fighting Talk, as a pundit on pan-African broadcaster GTV's Saturday morning preview show and Sunday night review show, as a commentator for Trans World International and Sky Sports, and as both pundit and commentator on UEFA Champions League matches for ART Prime Sports, Dubai. Since February 2017, O'Reilly and Chuck Nice have co-hosted the podcast StarTalk with Neil deGrasse Tyson.

== Honours ==
Tottenham Hotspur

- UEFA Cup: 1983–84

Crystal Palace

- Football League Second Division play-offs: 1989
- FA Cup runner-up: 1989–90
