= Andy Salako =

Nigerian footballer

Personal information
- Date of birth: 8 November 1972 (age 53)
- Place of birth: Lagos, Nigeria
- Position: Right back

Senior career*
Years	Team	Apps	(Gls)
1990–1992	Charlton Athletic	1	(0)
1992–1993	Welling United	20	(1)
1994–1995	Bromley	?	(?)
1995–1997	Carshalton Athletic	?	(?)
1997–1999	Sutton United	?	(?)
1999–2000	Carshalton Athletic	?	(?)
2000	Sutton United	6	(0)
2000–2001	Carshalton Athletic	?	(?)
2001	Sutton United	3	(2)
2001–2002	Croydon	?	(?)
2002	Bishop's Stortford	?	(?)
2002–2003	Horsham	?	(?)
- * Club domestic league appearances and goals

Andrew Salako (born 8 November 1972) is a Nigerian former professional footballer who played in the Football League, as a defender. He is the brother of former England international John Salako.
