= 1990 FA Cup final =

Association football championship match

- Event: 1989–90 FA Cup
| Crystal Palace | Manchester United |
- Manchester United won after a replay

Final
| Crystal Palace | Manchester United |
| 3 | 3 |
- After extra time
- Date: 12 May 1990
- Venue: Wembley Stadium, London
- Referee: Allan Gunn (Sussex)
- Attendance: 80,000

Replay
| Crystal Palace | Manchester United |
| 0 | 1 |
- Date: 17 May 1990
- Venue: Wembley Stadium, London
- Referee: Allan Gunn (Sussex)
- Attendance: 80,000

The 1990 FA Cup final was a football match played to determine to winners of the 1989–90 FA Cup. It was contested by Manchester United and Crystal Palace at Wembley Stadium, London, England. The match finished 3–3 after extra time. Bryan Robson and Mark Hughes (2) scored for Manchester United; Gary O'Reilly and Ian Wright (2) for Palace. Wright had only just recently returned from a broken leg that kept him out of the semi-final.

In the replay, Manchester United won 1–0 with a goal from Lee Martin – the second of only two goals he would score for the club. It saw them match Aston Villa and Tottenham Hotspur's record of seven FA Cup triumphs. In contrast, this was the first time Crystal Palace had appeared in an FA Cup final, and they had just completed their first season back in the top flight after nearly a decade away.

== Summary ==
This was the first FA Cup final to be played in front of an all-seater crowd, as Wembley's remaining standing areas had been converted to all-seater in the autumn of 1989.

The month before the final, UEFA had announced that the ban on English clubs in European competitions would be lifted for the 1990–91 season, provided that England fans behaved well at that summer's World Cup. England fans duly behaved well at the tournament, and this gave the green light to Manchester United to compete in the 1990–91 European Cup Winners' Cup, which they ultimately won. It also proved to be the turning point in Manchester United's history after a few lean seasons; over the next 20 years they collected a total of more than 20 major trophies including 13 Premier League titles and 2 UEFA Champions League titles.

If Crystal Palace had won the trophy, it would have gained them the first major trophy of their history and given them European qualification for the first time as well.

The 1990 Crystal Palace team was the last all-English (John Salako was born in Nigeria but played for England in 1991) team to play in an FA Cup final, while the Manchester United team was the last team to be composed solely of players from the United Kingdom to win the FA Cup final.

The 1990 FA Cup win was the third time Bryan Robson had been in the winning side in an FA Cup final; he had also now scored a total of three goals in FA Cup finals. He was the only player left from the 1983 FA Cup winning team, in which he had scored two goals in the final replay. He left the club just after their 1994 FA Cup final win, but was denied a fourth FA Cup winner's medal as he was not included into the squad for the final.

Manchester United's squad had changed so much since the appointment of Alex Ferguson as manager in November 1986 that Mark Hughes (bought back from Bayern Munich in 1988 after one year with Barcelona and another with the German side) was the only player in the team other than Robson still at the club who had featured in the 1985 FA Cup-winning side.

Manchester United did not play a single home game during their successful FA Cup campaign – this is the only time this has happened since 1966 when Everton played every cup game away from home.

== Route to the final ==
In all results below, the score of the finalist is given first.

| Manchester United | | Round | Crystal Palace | |
| Opposition | Score | Round | Opposition | Score |
|---|---|---|---|---|
| Nottingham Forest (A) | 1–0 | 3rd | Portsmouth (H) | 2–1 |
| Hereford United (A) | 1–0 | 4th | Huddersfield Town (H) | 4–0 |
| Newcastle United (A) | 3–2 | 5th | Rochdale (H) | 1–0 |
| Sheffield United (A) | 1–0 | 6th | Cambridge United (A) | 1–0 |
| Oldham Athletic (N) (R) Oldham Athletic (N) | 3–3 (a.e.t.); 2–1 (a.e.t.) | SF | Liverpool (N) | 4–3 (a.e.t.) |
Key: (H) = Home venue; (A) = Away venue; (N) = Neutral venue; (R) = Replay.

== First game ==
The first game on the Saturday was an open attacking affair. Both teams had been involved in dramatic high-scoring semi-finals and the final started the same way. On 17 minutes, Crystal Palace took the lead when Gary O'Reilly headed in from a free-kick, via Gary Pallister's head, despite the attempt of Jim Leighton to save the ball on the line. Manchester United hit back on 35 minutes. Brian McClair made a run down the right wing and floated a cross to the back post, where captain Bryan Robson was waiting to head goalwards. His header flicked off John Pemberton's shin and evaded Palace goalkeeper Nigel Martyn. It was 1–1 at half-time.

In the second half, Manchester United went ahead for the first time in the game, when a cross-shot from Neil Webb found its way to Mark Hughes who fired low into the corner. Palace manager, Steve Coppell made a game-changing substitution when he brought on Ian Wright, who had an immediate impact when he went on a mazy run past two Manchester United defenders and slotted a calm shot past Leighton. 2–2. Extra time loomed but not before Mike Phelan saw his clever chip hit the crossbar.

Extra time was needed for the second final in a row, and it was Palace who scored first, when John Salako floated a cross to the back post. Leighton hesitated for a second, which allowed Wright to volley home for his second goal of the game. 3–2 to Crystal Palace. However, the scoring was not over, and in the second period of extra time, Wallace provided the through ball for Hughes to chase, and he calmly angled the ball past the onrushing Martyn to make it 3–3.

== Replay ==
The main story of the replay was that Alex Ferguson decided to replace Jim Leighton in goal, with Les Sealey. Sealey made three important saves to keep Palace at bay, in a tough-tackling match. Leighton only played one more match for Manchester United, against Halifax Town in the Football League Cup on 26 September 1990.

The match itself was not as eventful as the first game, finishing 1–0. Manchester United won by a single goal scored by defender Lee Martin. He chested down a Neil Webb pass and fired high into the net, past Martyn in goal. Bryan Robson held aloft the Cup for the third time as captain. Manchester United joined Tottenham Hotspur as the only clubs to have won multiple FA Cup Final replays.

It was Manchester United's first major trophy under the management of Alex Ferguson. It is often debated that he would have been sacked if United had lost the third round match, although Ferguson claimed in his 1999 autobiography Managing My Life that the club's directors had assured him that his position as manager was secure; although naturally disappointed with the lack of progress in the league, they understood the reasons for this, namely the long-term absences of several key players due to injury.

== Cup final song ==
Manchester United's squad recorded "We Will Stand Together" for their appearance, whilst the Palace team recorded a version of the club's anthem "Glad All Over".

== Match details ==
=== Original final ===
12 May 1990
15:00 BST

| Crystal Palace | 3–3 (a.e.t.) | Manchester United |
|---|---|---|
| O'Reilly 18'; Wright 72', 92' | Report | Robson 35'; Hughes 62', 113' |

Wembley Stadium, London
Attendance: 78,000
Referee: Allan Gunn (Sussex)

| Crystal Palace | Manchester United |

| GK | 1 | (England) Nigel Martyn |
| RB | 2 | (England) John Pemberton |
| LB | 3 | (England) Richard Shaw |
| CM | 4 | (England) Andy Gray | (substituted off) 117' |
| CB | 5 | (England) Gary O'Reilly |
| CB | 6 | (England) Andy Thorn |
| RM | 7 | (England) Phil Barber | (substituted off) 69' |
| CM | 8 | (England) Geoff Thomas (c) |
| CF | 9 | (England) Mark Bright |
| LM | 10 | (England) John Salako |
| CM | 11 | (England) Alan Pardew |
Substitutes:
| FW | 12 | (England) Ian Wright | (substituted on) 69' |
| DF | 14 | (England) David Madden | (substituted on) 117' |
Manager:
(England) Steve Coppell

| GK | 1 | (Scotland) Jim Leighton |
| CM | 2 | (England) Paul Ince |
| LB | 3 | (England) Lee Martin | (substituted off) 88' |
| CB | 4 | (England) Steve Bruce |
| RB | 5 | (England) Mike Phelan |
| CB | 6 | (England) Gary Pallister | (substituted off) 93' |
| CM | 7 | (England) Bryan Robson (c) |
| RM | 8 | (England) Neil Webb |
| CF | 9 | (Scotland) Brian McClair |
| CF | 10 | (Wales) Mark Hughes |
| LM | 11 | (England) Danny Wallace |
Substitutes:
| FW | 12 | (England) Mark Robins | (substituted on) 93' |
| DF | 14 | (Wales) Clayton Blackmore | (substituted on) 88' |
Manager:
(Scotland) Alex Ferguson

Match rules

- 90 minutes.
- 30 minutes of extra-time if necessary.
- Replay if scores still level.
- Two named substitutes.
- Maximum of two substitutions.

=== Final replay ===
17 May 1990

| Crystal Palace | 0–1 | Manchester United |
|---|---|---|
| | | Martin 59' |

Wembley Stadium, London
Attendance: 80,000
Referee: Allan Gunn (Sussex)

| Crystal Palace | Manchester United |

| GK | 1 | (England) Nigel Martyn |
| RB | 2 | (England) John Pemberton |
| LB | 3 | (England) Richard Shaw |
| CM | 4 | (England) Andy Gray |
| CB | 5 | (England) Gary O'Reilly |
| CB | 6 | (England) Andy Thorn |
| RM | 7 | (England) Phil Barber | (substituted off) 64' |
| CM | 8 | (England) Geoff Thomas (c) |
| CF | 9 | (England) Mark Bright |
| LM | 10 | (England) John Salako | (substituted off) 79' |
| CM | 11 | (England) Alan Pardew |
Substitutes:
| FW | 12 | (England) Ian Wright | (substituted on) 64' |
| DF | 14 | (England) David Madden | (substituted on) 79' |
Manager:
(England) Steve Coppell

| GK | 1 | (England) Les Sealey |
| CM | 2 | (England) Paul Ince |
| LB | 3 | (England) Lee Martin |
| CB | 4 | (England) Steve Bruce |
| RB | 5 | (England) Mike Phelan |
| CB | 6 | (England) Gary Pallister |
| CM | 7 | (England) Bryan Robson (c) |
| RM | 8 | (England) Neil Webb |
| CF | 9 | (Scotland) Brian McClair |
| CF | 10 | (Wales) Mark Hughes |
| LM | 11 | (England) Danny Wallace |
Substitutes:
| DF | 12 | (Wales) Clayton Blackmore |
| FW | 14 | (England) Mark Robins |
Manager:
(Scotland) Alex Ferguson

Match rules

- 90 minutes.
- 30 minutes of extra-time if necessary.
- Penalty shoot-out if scores still level.
- Two named substitutes.
- Maximum of two substitutions.

== Sources ==
- 1990 Finals
