= Mark Bright =

English footballer, coach and sports commentator

Personal information
- Full name: Mark Abraham Bright
- Date of birth: 6 June 1962 (age 64)
- Place of birth: Stoke-on-Trent, England
- Height: 6 ft 0 in (1.83 m)
- Position: Forward

Youth career
- 1977–1978: Port Vale

Senior career*
Years	Team	Apps	(Gls)
1978–1981	Leek Town	34	(10)
1981–1984	Port Vale	29	(10)
1984–1986	Leicester City	42	(6)
1986–1992	Crystal Palace	227	(91)
1992–1997	Sheffield Wednesday	133	(48)
1996	→ Millwall (loan)	3	(1)
1997–1999	Charlton Athletic	27	(10)
Total		495	(176)
- * Club domestic league appearances and goals

Mark Abraham Bright (born 6 June 1962) is an English sports correspondent and former footballer.

Born to a Gambian father and English mother, he was adopted into a foster family in Stoke-on-Trent at an early age. He played non-League football for local side Leek Town before joining nearby Football League side Port Vale in 1981. He turned professional at the club the following year, though he would only enjoy an extended run in the first team during the 1983–84 season. He signed with First Division club Leicester City in June 1984. However, he failed to succeed with Leicester and was sold to Crystal Palace in November 1986. He helped Palace to win promotion out of the Second Division via the play-offs in 1989. He went on to play on the losing side of the 1990 FA Cup final before winning the Full Members' Cup in 1991. Building an effective strike partnership with Ian Wright, he scored 114 goals in 286 league and cup games for Crystal Palace and was also named on the PFA Second Division Team of the Year in 1987–88 and as the club's Player of The Year in 1990.

He was sold to Premier League rivals Sheffield Wednesday for a fee of £1,375,000 in September 1992, where he would stay for the next five years, scoring a further 70 goals in 170 games in all competitions. He featured in the 1993 League Cup final and 1993 FA Cup final, which ended in defeat to Arsenal both times. He lost his first-team place in the 1996–97 season and was loaned out to Millwall, also spending time at Swiss club Sion, who were unable to play him in competitive fixtures after failing to agree with Sheffield Wednesday. He eventually signed with Charlton Athletic in March 1997. He helped the club to win promotion to the Premier League with victory in the 1998 First Division play-off final before announcing his retirement the following year shortly before his 38th birthday. After retiring as a player, he worked as a pundit on various television and radio programmes. He married singer Michelle Gayle in 1996 and divorced in 2007; they have one son.

== Early life ==
Bright was born in Stoke-on-Trent, to Edwin Bright, a forklift truck driver from The Gambia, and Maureen Bright, a white English woman. His mother left home in November 1964, and his father put Bright and his brother, Phillip, up for adoption. His first foster home was with Helena Parton, where he and his brother stayed with while his sisters lived with his mother, who divorced Edwin in 1968. Parton ceased fostering the two boys in 1969 after she developed health problems and the boys went on to live with a new foster family in Kidsgrove, Bob and Irene Davies, who were experienced foster parents. The rest of his childhood was relatively happy and stable under their care until he left home at the age of 18. As the only black children at Dove Bank Primary, the two brothers were a target for bullies and were put in the same class to help the pair feel more comfortable. A clumsy attempt to combat the racism from the headteacher in a school assembly worked and the boys began to be accepted by the other children due to their natural footballing ability. Roy Bright, frontman of rock band Exit State, claims to be a half-brother of Mark Bright.

== Football career ==
=== Port Vale ===
Bright spent a year as a youth team player at Port Vale before being released at the age of 16. He then played part-time football at Cheshire County League club Leek Town and for Sunday league side Mason's Arms, before he rejoined Port Vale as an amateur in October 1981 on the recommendation of Mason's Arms co-manager Russell Bromage. Manager John McGrath handed him his full debut on the last day of the 1981–82 season, in a 2–0 win over Torquay United at Vale Park, two weeks after coming on as a substitute in a goalless home draw with York City on 1 May 1982. In the game against Torquay, he provided as assist for Paul Bowles, although missed an opportunity to score himself, telling a local reporter that, "I was waiting for the ball to bounce instead of having a go straight away". He went on to sign an initial one-year part-time contract on £10-a-week while also working as an apprentice for Staffs Hydraulics in Kidsgrove.

He played just once in the 1982–83 Fourth Division promotion campaign, scoring Vale's second goal in a 2–0 home win over Hereford United on 9 October. At the end of the season, he turned down an initial full-time professional contract offer as it paid less than his factory job, though he did sign a revised offer of £110-a-week with appearances and goal incentives. Bright came to prominence for the "Valiants" under the stewardship of new boss John Rudge towards the end of the 1983–84 season, scoring ten goals in 31 games. However, this was not enough to save the club from relegation out of the Third Division. Graham Barnett advised him to reject John Rudge's offer of a two-year contract, and Bright was consequently sold to Leicester City for £33,333 in June 1984. This fee was later doubled due to a top-up clause. Bright turned down a contract offer from Sheffield Wednesday manager Howard Wilkinson as he had already promised Leicester manager Gordon Milne he would sign for Leicester.

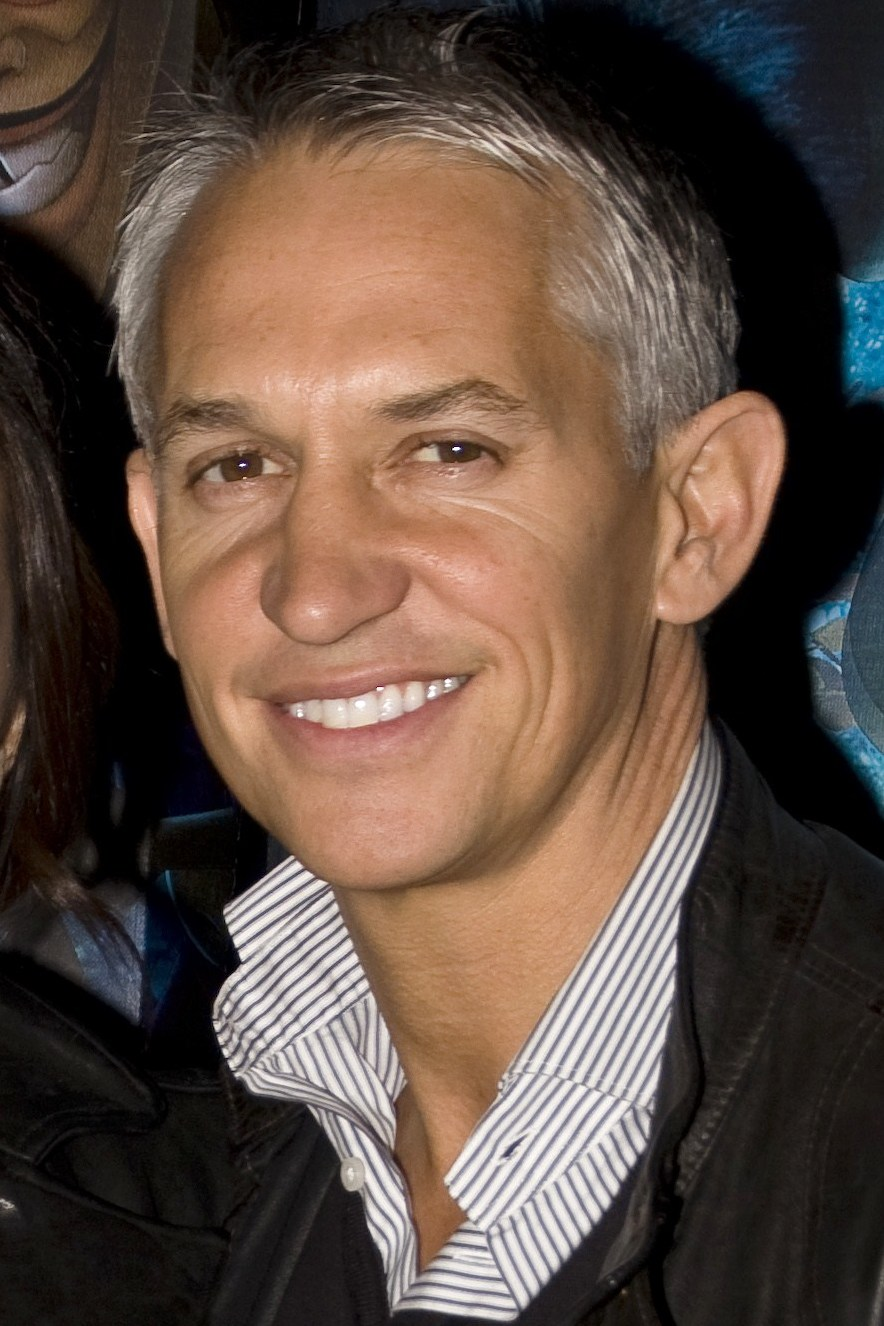
Lineker's departure allowed Bright to establish himself in the starting line-up.

=== Leicester City ===
Bright's contract with Leicester ran for three years and earned him £300-a-week, nearly tripling his Port Vale wages and a £10,000 signing-on bonus. The "Foxes" struggled in the lower half of the First Division table in the 1984–85 season. Bright was limited to 18 appearances and spent most of his time on the bench as Gary Lineker and Alan Smith were the club's established strike partnership. Lineker finished as the First Division's top-scorer but was sold to Everton in the summer of 1985, leaving Bright with an opportunity to establish himself in the starting eleven at Filbert Street. Bright opened the 1985–86 season by scoring two goals in a 3–1 home win over Everton. However, he struggled to match this performance for the rest of the campaign and lost confidence, which was worsened when a section of the Leicester crowd turned on him with racially aggravated abuse.

At a low point in his career, he was diagnosed with depression after seeking treatment for sleeping problems. Milne was moved upstairs at Leicester at the start of the 1986–87 season to become the club's general manager. Bright was not rated by new manager Bryan Hamilton. Bright turned down the offer of a move to Brian Horton's Hull City, as he did not want to move too far north, although took Horton's advice to ask Leicester for a move as the club were not willing to let Bright reach 50 club appearances and so trigger another top-up payment to Port Vale.

=== Crystal Palace ===
Bright was signed to Crystal Palace by manager Steve Coppell for a £75,000 fee on 13 November 1986. The initial contract was only a temporary three-month deal as there were medical concerns with his Osteitis pubis, meaning that if he was unfit at the end of this period he would be returned to Leicester. However, he went on to sign a permanent contract after completing the trial period. Palace already had a successful strike partnership in Ian Wright and Andy Gray, though Coppell moved Gray into central midfield to accommodate Bright up front. The "Eagles" were pressing for promotion out of the Second Division but finished two points outside the play-offs in 1986–87. Bright was named on the PFA Team of the Year and earned the Golden Boot for the highest scorer in the division in 1987–88 with 24 goals, although the club finished one place and two points outside of the play-offs. A third-place finish in 1988–89 secured them a place in the play-offs and Bright scored in the semi-final victory over Swindon Town, which helped Palace to reach the play-off final; Palace then beat Blackburn Rovers 4–3 on aggregate to win promotion to the top-flight.

Palace competed well in the First Division, except for the trip to Anfield where they were beaten by a club-record 9–0 margin by Liverpool, an experience Bright described as "numbing". He ended the 1989–90 season with 12 league goals, including a brace against Manchester United at Old Trafford, helping the team to finish five points above the relegation zone. The club's greatest achievement would come in the FA Cup however, as they gained revenge on Liverpool by beating them 4–3 after extra time in the semi-finals at Villa Park to secure a place in the 1990 FA Cup final, with Bright scoring the first of Palace's four goals. The club's first ever FA Cup final appearance, they held Manchester United to a replay after an initial 3–3 draw at Wembley Stadium but lost the replay 1–0 to a late Lee Martin goal as Alex Ferguson won his first trophy as Manchester United manager. Bright was disappointed as he felt he had not performed in the original game. One consolation for Bright was that he was named Crystal Palace's Player of The Year for the 1989–90 season.

As Palace impressed in the First Division throughout 1990–91, Bright proved his predatory skills at the highest level with a sequence of seven top-flight goals in just ten midwinter games as the "Eagles" secured their highest ever league finish of third. The potency of Bright and Wright's partnership was demonstrated on 25 September, when both players scored hat-tricks in an 8–0 win over Southend United at Selhurst Park in the League Cup. Palace went on to win the Full Members' Cup, beating Bristol Rovers, Brighton & Hove Albion, Luton Town, Norwich City and then Everton in the Wembley final, with Wright scoring a brace in extra-time. After Wright had left the club, Bright continued his great form for Palace and hit a total of 22 goals in the 1991–92 season. However, Coppell failed to replace Wright adequately, and Marco Gabbiadini was bought and sold on within the space of four months for a loss of £600,000. Bright scored Crystal Palace's first-ever Premier League goal on the opening day of the 1992–93 in a 3–3 home draw against Blackburn Rovers before being sold to Sheffield Wednesday.

=== Sheffield Wednesday ===
Bright joined Sheffield Wednesday on 11 September 1992 in a cash plus player exchange deal involving fellow striker Paul Williams that was rated at a total transfer value of £1,375,000. The Wednesday players were experienced and at the peak of their careers; manager Trevor Francis was eager to win trophies at Hillsborough and felt Bright would prove a good partner to club stalwart David Hirst, particularly with the highly talented Chris Waddle in midfield. After scoring six goals in the League Cup, Bright played in the League Cup final, which ended in a 2–1 defeat to Arsenal. Wednesday also reached the final of the FA Cup, where they would again face Arsenal, with Bright scoring an extra-time header against derby rivals Sheffield United to secure victory in the semi-finals. The final proved to be a disappointment, however, as he controversially elbowed Arsenal defender Andy Linighan in the face, causing a broken nose. Later, with the scores level in the last minute of extra time, a heavily bandaged Linighan out-jumped Bright from a corner to score the winning goal. After the game, Bright phoned Linighan to apologise.

Bright finished as the club's top-scorer for three consecutive seasons, eventually became the "Owls" highest goalscorer in the Premier League as of December 2019, scoring 48 goals between 1992 and 1996. With 19 goals, he was the Premier League's seventh-highest scorer in 1993–94. In Francis's last season in charge, he hit 13 goals in the 1994–95. He signed a new two-year contract in the summer of 1995, having rejected an approach from West Ham United manager Harry Redknapp. Wednesday then finished 15th in the league in 1995–96 under the stewardship of David Pleat, with Bright scoring 14 goals in all competitions despite playing a complete league game only 15 times. Pleat paid £2.7 million for Huddersfield Town forward Andy Booth in July 1996, signalling the end of Bright's time at Hillsborough. Having been almost entirely frozen out of the first-team during the 1996–97 season, Bright was loaned to South London derby rivals Millwall in the Second Division and scored on his debut for the "Lions" in a 1–1 draw at AFC Bournemouth.

Bright began training with the Swiss club Sion in January 1997. He left soon after due to unpaid wages and issues with his transfer fee with Sheffield Wednesday. Despite being unwanted at Leicester, the club still demanded a transfer fee of £60,000, which Sion chairman Christian Constantin refused to pay, which meant that Bright trained with the squad at Stade Tourbillon but was unable to feature in any competitive games. Despite this, he enjoyed his time training under manager Alberto Bigon and alongside Roberto Assis, the elder brother and later agent of Ronaldinho.

=== Charlton Athletic ===
Bright eventually signed with Charlton Athletic in March 1997 on a contract to run until the end of the 1996–97 season. After two substitute appearances, he scored a brace in his first start for the "Addicks" in a 2–1 win over Portsmouth at The Valley on 19 April. Manager Alan Curbishley was keen on experienced players to bolster his young squad, therefore signed Bright to a one-year deal in the summer. He scored seven goals in the 1997–98 campaign to help Charlton to a fourth-place finish in the First Division and a place in the play-offs. Charlton overcame Ipswich Town in the semi-finals and then beat Sunderland in the play-off final, which was won 7–6 on penalties after a 4–4 draw; Bright started the final, although did not take a penalty in the shoot-out as he was taken off in extra-time. He then agreed on a new one-year contract, accepting a role mainly as a squad player and experienced pro for the younger players to learn from. Charlton failed to survive in the Premier League, however, and Bright retired from professional football at the end of the 1998–99 season. Bright wrote in his autobiography that he earned a total of £1.2 million from his 18-year career as a professional player.

== Media career ==
After retiring, Bright became a football correspondent on The Big Breakfast and co-presented The Wright Bright Show with former teammate Ian Wright on BBC Radio 5 Live. He also commentates on some international matches, often alongside Jonathan Pearce and Steve Wilson on Match of the Day. He has worked as a sports correspondent for the BBC on BBC London News, Football Focus, Fighting Talk, 5 Live Sport, and on final Score. He has also provided punditry for Match magazine and British Eurosport. In summer 2009, he joined the Crystal Palace academy set-up, along with his former teammate John Salako. He was inducted into the City of Stoke-on-Trent Hall of Fame in 2019. He published his autobiography, My Story - from foster care to footballer, in November 2019.

== Personal life ==
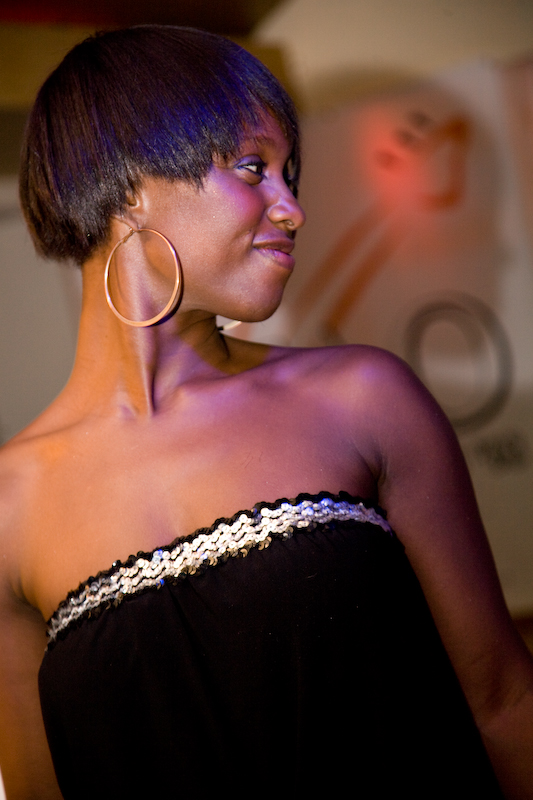
Ex-wife Michelle Gayle.

He met British singer and actress Michelle Gayle in 1995, and the couple married in Las Vegas the following year. They divorced in 2007, although they remain friends. Their son was born in April 2000. Bright married Dionne, the estranged sister of his former teammate Ian Wright, in June 2025. Bright has completed six half marathons since his retirement in 1999, all of them in the Great North Run. He is also a regular competitor in the London Marathon, raising funds for cancer research in 2000, the Willow Foundation in 2005 and The Rhys Daniels Trust in 2006.

== Career statistics ==
Appearances and goals by club, season and competition
Club	Season	League			FA Cup		Other		Total	
Club	Season	Division	Apps	Goals	Apps	Goals	Apps	Goals	Apps	Goals
Leek Town	1980–81	Cheshire County League	29	5	1	0	4	1	34	6
Leek Town	1981–82	Cheshire County League	5	5	0	0	1	0	6	5
Leek Town	Total		34	10	1	0	5	1	40	11
Port Vale	1981–82	Fourth Division	2	0	0	0	0	0	2	0
Port Vale	1982–83	Fourth Division	1	1	0	0	0	0	1	1
Port Vale	1983–84	Third Division	26	9	1	1	4	0	31	10
Port Vale	Total		29	10	1	1	4	0	34	11
Leicester City	1984–85	First Division	16	0	0	0	2	0	18	0
Leicester City	1985–86	First Division	24	6	1	0	2	0	27	6
Leicester City	1986–87	First Division	2	0	0	0	0	0	2	0
Leicester City	Total		42	6	1	0	4	0	47	6
Crystal Palace	1986–87	Second Division	28	7	2	0	0	0	30	7
Crystal Palace	1987–88	Second Division	38	25	1	0	3	1	42	26
Crystal Palace	1988–89	Second Division	46	20	1	0	12	5	59	25
Crystal Palace	1989–90	First Division	36	12	6	3	8	3	50	18
Crystal Palace	1990–91	First Division	32	9	3	0	11	6	46	15
Crystal Palace	1991–92	First Division	42	17	1	0	11	5	54	22
Crystal Palace	1992–93	Premier League	5	1	0	0	0	0	5	1
Crystal Palace	Total		227	91	14	3	45	20	286	114
Sheffield Wednesday	1992–93	Premier League	30	11	7	3	7	6	44	20
Sheffield Wednesday	1993–94	Premier League	40	19	3	2	7	2	50	23
Sheffield Wednesday	1994–95	Premier League	37	11	3	2	3	0	43	13
Sheffield Wednesday	1995–96	Premier League	25	7	0	0	7	7	32	14
Sheffield Wednesday	1996–97	Premier League	1	0	0	0	0	0	1	0
Sheffield Wednesday	Total		133	48	13	7	24	15	170	70
Millwall (loan)	1996–97	Second Division	3	1	0	0	1	0	4	1
Charlton Athletic	1996–97	First Division	6	2	0	0	0	0	6	2
Charlton Athletic	1997–98	First Division	16	7	3	0	5	0	24	7
Charlton Athletic	1998–99	Premier League	5	1	1	0	1	0	7	1
Charlton Athletic	Total		27	10	4	0	6	0	37	10
Career total			495	176	34	11	89	36	618	223

== Honours ==
Port Vale

- Football League Fourth Division third-place promotion: 1982–83

Crystal Palace

- Football League Second Division play-offs: 1989
- Full Members' Cup: 1990–91
- FA Cup runner-up: 1989–90

Sheffield Wednesday

- FA Cup runner-up: 1992–93
- Football League Cup runner-up: 1992–93

Charlton Athletic

- Football League First Division play-offs: 1998

Individual

- PFA Team of the Year: 1987–88 Second Division
- Crystal Palace Player of the Year: 1990
