= Geoff Thomas (footballer, born 1964) =

English footballer

Geoff Thomas MBE
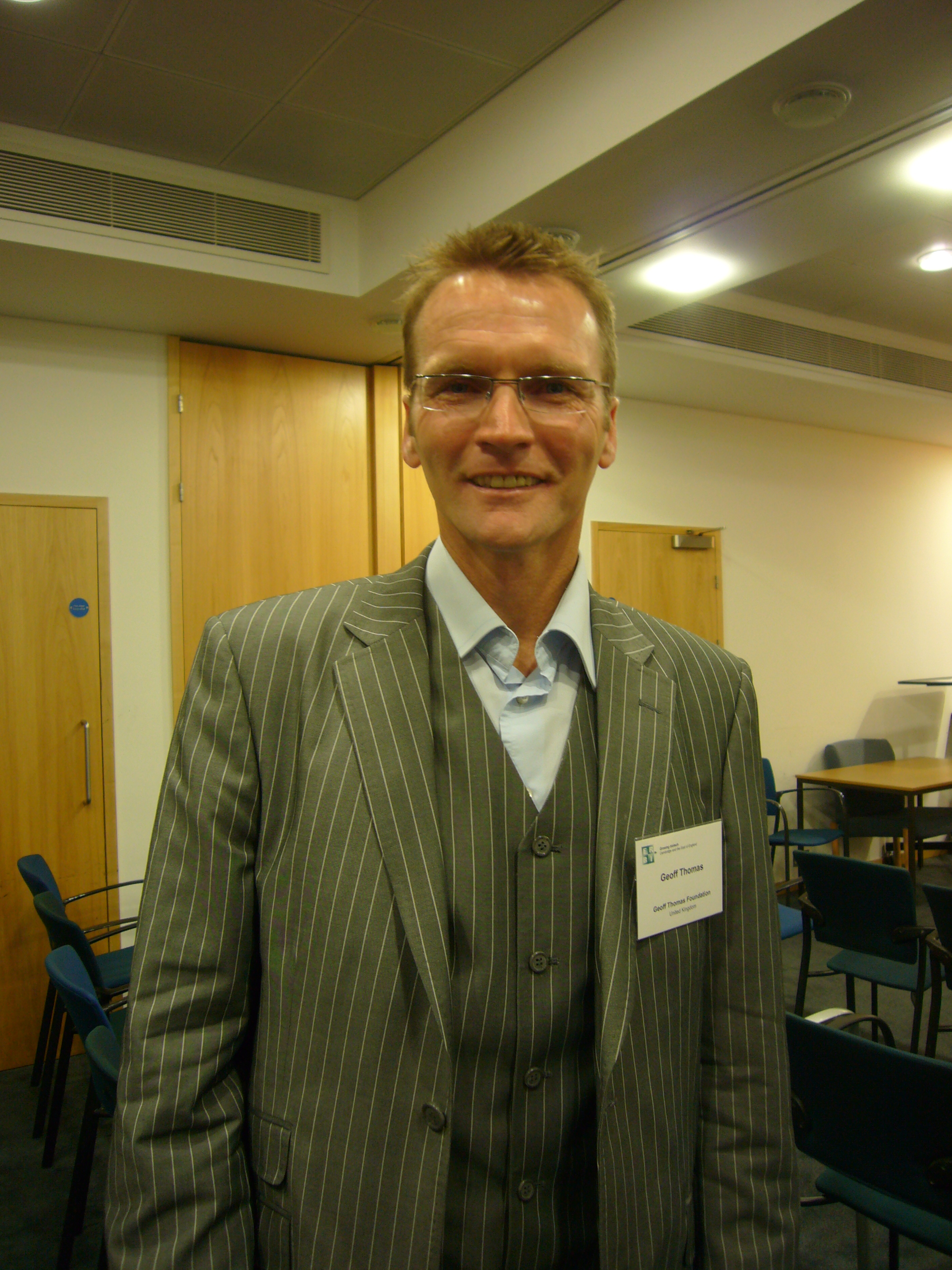
- Thomas in 2007

Personal information
- Full name: Geoffrey Robert Thomas
- Date of birth: 5 August 1964 (age 62)
- Place of birth: Manchester, England
- Height: 5 ft 10 in (1.78 m)
- Position: Midfielder

Senior career*
Years	Team	Apps	(Gls)
1982	Rochdale	11	(1)
1984–1987	Crewe Alexandra	125	(20)
1987–1993	Crystal Palace	195	(26)
1993–1997	Wolverhampton Wanderers	46	(8)
1997–1999	Nottingham Forest	25	(4)
1999–2001	Barnsley	38	(4)
2001	Notts County	8	(1)
2001–2002	Crewe Alexandra	14	(2)
Total		462	(66)

International career
1990–1992	England B	3	(0)
1991–1992	England	9	(0)
- * Club domestic league appearances and goals

Geoffrey Robert Thomas MBE (born 5 August 1964) is an English former footballer, who won nine caps for the full England team and captained Crystal Palace to the FA Cup final in 1990. He is the Founder of the Geoff Thomas Foundation, a charity that raises funds to fight cancer, a disease from which Thomas has suffered.

== Club career ==
After playing non-league football in his teenage years, Thomas gambled on a career in professional football in 1982 by taking a pay cut from his job as an electrician, to sign full-time with Rochdale in 1982. He did not play much whilst at Spotland, in the two seasons he spent at Rochdale he made only 12 appearances scoring just once.

In March 1984, Dario Gradi signed Thomas for Crewe Alexandra, on a free transfer. After three substitute appearances, Thomas made his full debut on 28 April 1984 in a 3–0 home win over Tranmere Rovers, and marked the occasion with his first goal for the club. A tough-tackling player, who could operate in central midfield or out on the right, Thomas was a mainstay of the team as Crewe finishing mid-table in the Fourth Division. He was to spend two and a half seasons at Gresty Road, playing 137 times for the club

Thomas moved to Crystal Palace in June 1987, for a fee of £50,000. Thomas made an immediate impact at Selhurst Park, collecting the Supporters' Player-of-the-Season award in his first season, and helping his side to promotion to the top flight in his second year at the club. His third year at Palace was even better, as Thomas enjoyed top-flight football for the first team, and captained the side in the 1990 FA Cup Final at Wembley Stadium, where they drew 3–3 with Manchester United, before losing in a replay. In the 1990–91 season, he was a crucial member of the Palace squad who finished in third place in the top flight. It was the club's best ever finishing position, and Thomas was rewarded again with the Supporters` Player-of-the-Year trophy.

His Palace career eventually ended in June 1993, six years and 249 appearances after first arriving from Crewe, when Palace were relegated from the Premier League, and he was signed for £800,000 by Wolverhampton Wanderers by Graham Turner. Because of injury, he made just two appearances in his first season at Molineux, and made a total of just 54 appearances in the four seasons he spent in the Black Country, before his release on a free transfer in 1997.

Injuries also hampered his spells at Nottingham Forest (27 appearances in two seasons), and Barnsley (where he was mostly used as a substitute), and he struggled to get a run of games in the side. He also had a brief stint with Notts County at the end of the 2000–01 season, scoring once against Wrexham, before returning to Crewe Alexandra where he made his final seventeen appearances as a professional footballer. His return to Crewe was hampered by injuries and he could not stop them losing their 1st Division status at the end of the season, despite scoring twice, against West Brom and Grimsby Town. His final appearance as a professional came in the FA Cup against Rotherham United on 26 January 2002, a game in which he also scored.

== International career ==
In May 1991, Thomas won his first England cap when he was picked by Graham Taylor in a European Championship qualifier against Turkey in İzmir. He also represented his country against the Soviet Union, Argentina, Australia, New Zealand and Malaysia that year, and went on to win nine caps, his last coming against France at Wembley in 1992.

== Leukaemia ==
In June 2003, after a year in retirement, Thomas revealed he had been diagnosed with chronic myeloid leukaemia, from which he later recovered. He won the BBC Sports Personality of the Year Helen Rollason Award in 2005, after he raised over £150,000 for the Leukaemia Research charity by cycling 2,200 miles (3540km) in 21 days, completing the route of all 21 stages of the 2005 Tour de France a few days ahead of the race itself.

In 2005, he was voted in Palace's Centenary XI, and was then given a Special Achievement Award for his services to the club as captain in 2008.

In 2007, Thomas announced his intention to ride the Tour de France route again.

In 2008, he published a biography, Riding Through The Storm

In 2014 Thomas returned to Birmingham-based blood cancer charity Cure Leukaemia to help them raise £2 million in two years. As patron of the charity he rode in two cycling events in 2015. In June he led 300 riders including Mark Bright, John Salako, George Lineker, Ian Wright, Aidy Boothroyd and Jill Douglas from London to Paris. In July 2015 Thomas completed all 21 stages of the Tour de France route, one day ahead of the race itself. His aim was to raise £1 million from this event, a figure that one leveraged by Cure Leukaemia's model would be worth £10 million in potentially life-saving drugs for blood cancer patients. The 11-strong team completed the route and raised a substantial amount of funds; fellow cancer survivor Lance Armstrong joined the team for two stages.

In 2017 Thomas joined Doug McKinnon, Hayden Groves and James Maltin, and took on all three grand tours by to raise further funds for Cure Leukaemia.

Thomas was awarded an honorary doctorate by Birmingham City University on 8 January 2018 in recognition of his long-standing charity work and sporting achievements.

In March 2021, Thomas announced his intention to ride the Tour de France route again to raise further funds for Cure Leukaemia.

In June 2021, Thomas was awarded the MBE for his efforts in respect of cancer-charity fund raising.

== Honours ==
Crystal Palace

- Full Members' Cup: 1990–91
- FA Cup runner-up: 1989–90

Nottingham Forest

- Football League First Division: 1997–98

Sporting positions
Preceded by Jim Cannon	Crystal Palace captain 1988-1993	Succeeded by Gareth Southgate
