= Tony Witter =

English footballer

Personal information
- Full name: Anthony Junior Witter
- Date of birth: 12 August 1965 (age 61)
- Place of birth: London, England
- Height: 6 ft 1 in (1.85 m)
- Position: Defender

Senior career*
Years	Team	Apps	(Gls)
1989–1990	Grays Athletic		
1990–1991	Crystal Palace		
1991–1994	Queens Park Rangers	1	(0)
1991	→ Millwall (loan)	0	(0)
1992	→ Plymouth Argyle (loan)	3	(1)
1994	→ Reading (loan)	4	(0)
1994	→ Millwall (loan)	10	(0)
1994–1998	Millwall	92	(2)
1998	Northampton	4	(0)
1998	Welling United		
1998	Torquay United	4	(0)
1998–1999	Welling United		
1999	Scunthorpe United	14	(0)
1999	Hayes	2	(0)
1999	Enfield	0	(0)
1999	Bohemians	1	(0)
Total		135	(3)
- * Club domestic league appearances and goals

Anthony Junior Witter (born 12 August 1965) is an English retired footballer who played during the 1980s and 1990s.

Witter was a central defender who played for numerous clubs during his career including Millwall, Scunthorpe United and Bohemians amongst others. He spent nearly five years at Millwall making 104 league appearances, scoring two goals. He made a solitary appearance for Bohemians, against Galway United in December 1999.

He held the record for the quickest goal scored for Plymouth Argyle by a player on his debut until Jamie Mackie broke it on 12 February 2008, against Barnsley.
