= 1993 FA Cup final =

English association football match

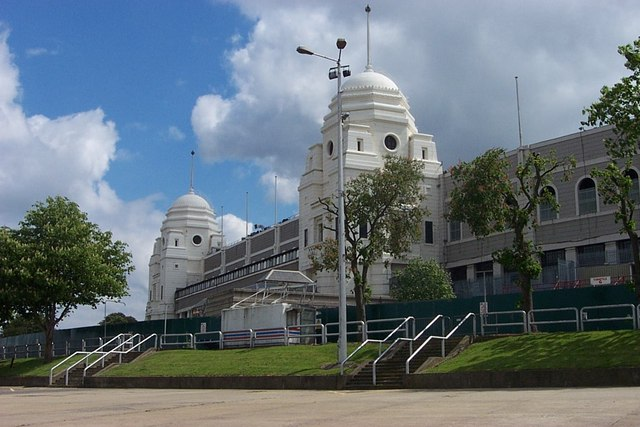
- The final and the replay were held at Wembley Stadium.
- Event: 1992–93 FA Cup
Arsenal	Sheffield Wednesday
- Arsenal won after a replay

Final
Arsenal	Sheffield Wednesday
1	1
- After extra time
- Date: 15 May 1993
- Venue: Wembley Stadium, London
- Referee: Keren Barratt (Warwickshire)
- Attendance: 79,347

Replay
Arsenal	Sheffield Wednesday
2	1
- After extra time
- Date: 20 May 1993
- Venue: Wembley Stadium, London
- Referee: Keren Barratt (Warwickshire)
- Attendance: 62,267

The 1993 FA Cup final was contested by Arsenal and Sheffield Wednesday at Wembley. The original match, played on 15 May 1993, finished 1–1. Arsenal won the replay on 20 May, 2–1 after extra-time.

It was Arsenal's sixth FA Cup final victory, and their first since the 1979 FA Cup final. They became the first English side to achieve a domestic cup double, having also won the 1993 Football League Cup final.

It was Sheffield Wednesday's first appearance in the FA Cup final since 1966. They also reached the League Cup final that season, also losing 2–1 to Arsenal (though without a replay). This appearance of the same two sides in the final of both of England's domestic knock-out tournaments in the same season had never happened before, and would be the only time until 2022. Sheffield Wednesday have not appeared in a domestic cup final since, reaching two League Cup semi-finals since then.

The replay saw the last Arsenal appearance by veteran defender David O'Leary, who left shortly afterwards to join Leeds United, after an 18-year spell with Arsenal which had yielded 722 competitive games and six major trophies.

== Match summary ==
=== Original match ===
Arsenal took the lead in the 20th minute, when Ian Wright headed in a cross. Sheffield Wednesday equalised in the 61st minute, when David Hirst turned in a low drive, past the advancing Arsenal goalkeeper, David Seaman.

=== Replay ===
The kick-off for the replay was delayed by 30 minutes after an accident on the M1 motorway had delayed the arrival of most of Sheffield Wednesday's fans.

Once again, Ian Wright opened the scoring for Arsenal, running onto a through ball to prod the ball past Chris Woods, into the corner of the net. This was his fourth goal in FA Cup finals at Wembley, just one behind the record-holder Ian Rush. Wednesday attacked Arsenal in the second half, and Chris Waddle's shot deflected off Arsenal defender Lee Dixon into the net in the 68th minute.

The game went into extra time, and with two minutes of the second half remaining, central defender Andy Linighan scored with a header from a Paul Merson corner. Goalkeeper Chris Woods fumbled and Graham Hyde could only help the ball into the top of the net. Linighan had played most of the game with a broken nose after Mark Bright had struck him in the face with his elbow.

== Firsts and lasts ==
The two clubs had already contested the season's League Cup final, a match which Arsenal had won 2–1. It was the first time that the same two clubs had reached the final of both domestic club competitions.

It was also dubbed the 'longest' FA Cup final. It had gone to extra-time in the replay – a match which was delayed by thirty minutes – and was just one minute away from the first ever FA Cup final penalty shoot-out. It was also the last FA Cup final to go to a replay; from 1999 onwards, it was decided that all FA Cup finals would be decided on the day.

This was the first FA Cup final in which squad numbers had been used, having been trialled in the League Cup final. Players from both clubs retained the same numbers for the three matches. The system was fully adopted by the Premier League for the following season.

For Arsenal, David O'Leary played his last two official matches after joining the club as an apprentice in 1973. His testimonial took place between the final and the replay, on 17 May 1993. During extra time in the replay, Alan Smith received the only yellow card of his professional career.

== Match details ==
15 May 1993
15:00 BST

Arsenal	1–1 (a.e.t.)	Sheffield Wednesday
Wright 20'	Report	Hirst 61'

Wembley Stadium, London
Attendance: 79,347
Referee: Keren Barratt

Arsenal	Sheffield Wednesday

GK	1	(England) David Seaman
DF	2	(England) Lee Dixon
DF	5	(England) Andy Linighan
DF	6	(England) Tony Adams (c)
DF	3	(England) Nigel Winterburn
MF	10	(England) Paul Merson
MF	14	(England) Paul Davis
MF	17	(Denmark) John Jensen
MF	11	(England) Ray Parlour	(substituted off) 66'
FW	7	(England) Kevin Campbell
FW	8	(England) Ian Wright	(substituted off) 90'
Substitutes:
DF	22	(Republic of Ireland) David O'Leary	(substituted on) 90'
FW	9	(England) Alan Smith	(substituted on) 66'
Manager:
(Scotland) George Graham

GK	1	(England) Chris Woods
RB	2	(Sweden) Roland Nilsson
CB	6	(England) Viv Anderson (c)	(substituted off) 85'
CB	9	(England) Paul Warhurst
LB	3	(Northern Ireland) Nigel Worthington
RM	8	(England) Chris Waddle	(substituted off) 112'
CM	4	(England) Carlton Palmer
CM	11	(Republic of Ireland) John Sheridan
LM	15	(United States) John Harkes
CF	5	(England) David Hirst
CF	10	(England) Mark Bright
Substitutes:
MF	14	(England) Chris Bart-Williams	(substituted on) 112'
MF	17	(England) Graham Hyde	(substituted on) 85'
Manager:
(England) Trevor Francis

Match officials

- Assistant referees:
  - Roy Pearson
  - Brian Wigginton
- Fourth official: Roger Dilkes

Match rules

- 90 minutes
- 30 minutes of extra-time if necessary
- Replay if scores still level
- Two named substitutes
- Maximum of two substitutions

=== Replay ===
20 May 1993
20:30 BST

Arsenal	2–1 (a.e.t.)	Sheffield Wednesday
Wright 34'; Linighan 119'	Report	Waddle 68'

Wembley Stadium, London
Attendance: 62,267
Referee: Keren Barratt

Arsenal	Sheffield Wednesday

GK	1	(England) David Seaman
RB	2	(England) Lee Dixon
CB	5	(England) Andy Linighan
CB	6	(England) Tony Adams (c)
LB	3	(England) Nigel Winterburn
CM	14	(England) Paul Davis
CM	17	(Denmark) John Jensen
CM	10	(England) Paul Merson
RW	7	(England) Kevin Campbell
CF	8	(England) Ian Wright	(substituted off) 81'
LW	9	(England) Alan Smith
Substitutes:
DF	22	(Republic of Ireland) David O'Leary	(substituted on) 81'
MF	4	(England) Ian Selley
Manager:
(Scotland) George Graham

GK	1	(England) Chris Woods
RB	2	(Sweden) Roland Nilsson	(substituted off) 118'
CB	4	(England) Carlton Palmer (c)
CB	9	(England) Paul Warhurst
LB	3	(Northern Ireland) Nigel Worthington
RM	8	(England) Chris Waddle
CM	7	(Northern Ireland) Danny Wilson	(substituted off) 62'
CM	11	(Republic of Ireland) John Sheridan
LM	15	(United States) John Harkes
CF	5	(England) David Hirst
CF	10	(England) Mark Bright
Substitutes:
MF	14	(England) Chris Bart-Williams	(substituted on) 118'
MF	17	(England) Graham Hyde	(substituted on) 62'
Manager:
(England) Trevor Francis

Match officials

- Assistant referees:
  - Roy Pearson
  - Brian Wigginton
- Fourth official: Roger Dilkes

Match rules

- 90 minutes
- 30 minutes of extra-time if necessary
- Penalty shoot-out if scores still level
- Two named substitutes
- Maximum of two substitutions
