= Graham Hyde =

English footballer (born 1970)

Personal information
- Full name: Graham Hyde
- Date of birth: 10 November 1970 (age 55)
- Place of birth: Doncaster, England
- Height: 5 ft 8 in (1.73 m)
- Position: Midfielder

Senior career*
Years	Team	Apps	(Gls)
1988–1999	Sheffield Wednesday	174	(11)
1999–2002	Birmingham City	51	(1)
2001	→ Chesterfield (loan)	9	(1)
2002	→ Peterborough United (loan)	9	(0)
2002–2004	Bristol Rovers	58	(3)
2004–2005	Hereford United	32	(0)
2005–2006	Worcester City	13	(1)
2006	Hednesford Town	3	(0)
2006–2007	Halesowen Town	1	(0)
2007–2008	Fleet Town	1	(0)
Total		351	(17)

Managerial career
- 2011–2012: Redditch United
- 2012: Boston United (caretaker)
- 2013: AFC Telford United
- * Club domestic league appearances and goals

Graham Hyde (born 10 November 1970) is an English football manager and former professional player.

As a player, he was a midfielder from 1988 to 2008. He spent seven top-flight seasons with Sheffield Wednesday (six in the Premier League) and played in the Football League for Birmingham City, Chesterfield, Peterborough United and Bristol Rovers. He then moved into non-league football with Hereford United, Worcester City, Hednesford Town, Halesowen Town and Fleet Town.

In 2011, he became manager of Redditch United but departed at the end of the 2011–12 season. He later became the assistant manager of Boston United where he had a spell as caretaker manager before a period in charge of AFC Telford United in 2013.

== Playing career ==
Hyde played for Sheffield Wednesday, Birmingham City, Chesterfield (on loan), Peterborough United (on loan), Bristol Rovers, Hereford United and Worcester City.

With his peak coming at the beginning of his career at Sheffield Wednesday, he made many Premiership appearances and played in the 1993 FA Cup Final. He signed for Birmingham from Sheffield Wednesday on 4 February 1999 on a free transfer after falling down the pecking order at Hillsborough, and helped the Blues win promotion to the Premier League in 2002. During his time at Birmingham he scored twice with strikes against Tranmere Rovers in the league and West Ham United in the League Cup. After spells on loan at Chesterfield (scoring once against Swindon) and Peterborough United, Hyde joined Division Three side Bristol Rovers in November 2002 having made no Premier League appearances for Birmingham.

He later played at non-league Worcester City, where he remained until March 2006 when he joined Hednesford Town. In November 2006 he returned to football as player/assistant manager at British Gas Business Southern League Premier Division side, Halesowen Town. He worked under manager Martin O'Connor, another former Birmingham player.

In October 2007 Hyde signed for Fleet Town, managed by Hyde's former Sheffield Wednesday teammate Andy Sinton.

== Managerial career ==
Hyde joined Redditch United as joint manager with Mark Fenemore in September 2011, taking sole charge in November 2011. After leading the club to Southern League Premier Division safety he resigned at the beginning of May 2012.

In the summer of 2012 Boston United parted company with joint manager Lee Canoville, deciding to keep Jason Lee on as the sole manager, in turn Lee brought in Hyde as his assistant. Hyde became caretaker manager when Lee was dismissed in December 2012.

In 2013, he joined AFC Telford United as the assistant manager to his former Sheffield Wednesday teammate Andy Sinton. The move came after former Telford assistant manager Mike Davies left his role at the bucks for work commitments. Sinton was dismissed by the Telford board, but Hyde remained as assistant manager working alongside Mark Cooper. On 1 March 2013, Cooper joined Swindon Town as assistant to Kevin MacDonald and Hyde was appointed manager until the end of the season. However, he resigned after only two games in charge.

== Honours ==
Sheffield Wednesday

- FA Cup runner-up: 1992–93
- Football League Cup runner-up: 1992–93
