= 1990–91 Full Members' Cup =

6th staging of a knock-out competition for English football clubs

Tournament details
- Country: England
- Teams: 39

Final positions
- Champions: Crystal Palace (1st title)
- Runners-up: Everton
- Semifinalists: Leeds United; Norwich City

Tournament statistics
- Matches played: 40
- Goals scored: 130 (3.25 per match)

The 1990–91 Full Members' Cup, known as the Zenith Data Systems Cup for sponsorship reasons, was the 6th staging of a knock-out competition for English football clubs in the First and Second Division. The winners were Crystal Palace and the runners-up were Everton.

The competition began on 20 November 1990 and ended with the final on 7 April 1991 at Wembley Stadium.

In the first round, there were two sections: North and South. In the following rounds each section gradually eliminates teams in knock-out fashion until each has a winning finalist. At this point, the two winning finalists face each other in the combined final for the honour of the trophy.

Arsenal, Liverpool, Tottenham, Manchester United and Aston Villa opted out of this competition.

== First round ==
=== Northern Section ===
Date	Home team	Score	Away team
27 November	Leicester City	0–1	Wolverhampton Wanderers
20 November	Middlesbrough	3–1	Hull City
20 November	Notts County	1–0	Port Vale
21 November	West Bromwich Albion	3–5	Barnsley

=== Southern Section ===
Date	Home team	Score	Away team
21 November	Oxford United	3–2	Bristol City
20 November	Plymouth Argyle	0–0	Brighton & Hove Albion
Brighton & Hove Albion won 3–1 on penalties
20 November	Watford	1–2	Bristol Rovers

== Second round ==
=== Northern Section ===
Date	Home team	Score	Away team
18 December	Blackburn Rovers	1–4	Everton
19 December	Derby County	1–0	Coventry City
19 December	Manchester City	2–1	Middlesbrough
21 November	Nottingham Forest	2–1	Newcastle United
11 December	Notts County	2–2	Sunderland
Sunderland won 5–3 on penalties
11 December	Sheffield United	7–2	Oldham Athletic
18 December	Sheffield Wednesday	3–3	Barnsley
Barnsley won 4–3 on penalties
19 December	Wolverhampton Wanderers	1–2	Leeds United

=== Southern Section ===
Date	Home team	Score	Away team
19 December	Brighton & Hove Albion	3–1	Charlton Athletic
12 December	Chelsea	1–0	Swindon Town
18 December	Crystal Palace	2–1	Bristol Rovers
19 December	Luton Town	5–1	West Ham United
19 December	Norwich City	1–1	Millwall
Norwich City won 6–5 on penalties
12 December	Oxford United	1–0	Portsmouth
20 November	Southampton	4–0	Queens Park Rangers
12 December	Wimbledon	0–2	Ipswich Town

== Third round ==
=== Northern Section ===
Date	Home team	Score	Away team
30 January	Barnsley	2–1	Nottingham Forest
22 January	Everton	4–1	Sunderland
22 January	Leeds United	2–1	Derby County
22 January	Sheffield United	0–2	Manchester City

=== Southern Section ===
Date	Home team	Score	Away team
18 February	Brighton & Hove Albion	0–2	Crystal Palace
18 February	Chelsea	1–1	Luton Town
Luton Town won 4–1 on penalties
22 January	Ipswich Town	2–1	Oxford United
20 February	Norwich City	2–1	Southampton

== Area semi-finals ==
=== Northern Section ===
Date	Home team	Score	Away team
13 March	Barnsley	0–1	Everton
20 February	Leeds United	2–0	Manchester City

=== Southern Section ===
Date	Home team	Score	Away team
26 February	Crystal Palace	3–1	Luton Town
27 February	Norwich City	2–0	Ipswich Town

== Area finals ==
=== Northern Area final ===
Date	Home team	Score	Away team
19 March	Leeds United	3–3	Everton
21 March	Everton	3–1	Leeds United

Everton beat Leeds United 6–4 on aggregate.

=== Southern Area final ===
Date	Home team	Score	Away team
5 March	Norwich City	1–1	Crystal Palace
19 March	Crystal Palace	2–0	Norwich City

Crystal Palace beat Norwich City 3–1 on aggregate.

== Final ==
7 April 1991
15:00 BST

Crystal Palace	4–1 (a.e.t.)	Everton
Thomas 67'; Wright 101', 115'; Salako 113'		Warzycha 69'

Wembley Stadium, London
Attendance: 52,460
