= David Hirst (footballer) =

English footballer (born 1967)

Personal information
- Full name: David Eric Hirst
- Date of birth: 7 December 1967 (age 58)
- Place of birth: Barnsley, England
- Height: 5 ft 11 in (1.80 m)
- Position: Striker

Senior career*
Years	Team	Apps	(Gls)
1985–1986	Barnsley	28	(9)
1986–1997	Sheffield Wednesday	294	(106)
1997–2000	Southampton	30	(9)
Total		352	(124)

International career
1985	England U17	3	(0)
1985–1986	England Youth	5	(2)
1988–1989	England U21	7	(1)
1991–1992	England B	3	(2)
1991–1992	England	3	(1)
- * Club domestic league appearances and goals

David Eric Hirst (born 7 December 1967) is an English football coach and former professional player.

As a player, he was a striker who after initially playing with Barnsley he notably spent eleven years with Sheffield Wednesday, during his time at Hillsborough he played Premier League football and played in both the 1993 FA Cup and League Cup finals. He scored 106 league goals in 294 appearances and continuously played in the first seven Premier League seasons, which included three years with Southampton before retiring through injury at the age of 32. He was capped three times by England, scoring one goal and also made appearances at England U21 and England B level.

Since retiring, Hirst has worked at Sheffield Wednesday and Crystal Palace as an academy coach, he has also worked back with Wednesday as a host in their corporate hospitality suites.

== Club career ==
=== Barnsley ===
Born in Cudworth, Barnsley, Hirst turned professional in 1985 with his local side, Barnsley. His debut season saw him score nine goals in 28 Second Division games.

=== Sheffield Wednesday ===
On 11 August 1986, he signed for Sheffield Wednesday. He was brought to Wednesday by then manager Howard Wilkinson, just before the start of the 1986–87 season. The fee was £250,000. Barnsley's financial troubles saw the young striker sold. His Owls debut came against Charlton Athletic which was the first game of the season as Wednesday began the season away in a 1–1 First Division draw on 23 August 1986. However the following week he made his Hillsborough debut as a substitute against Everton in front of over 33,000 and he scored within minutes of entering the field. He would go on to make 21 league appearances that season, scoring six goals. By 1988–89 he was firmly established in the first team.

He became a firm favourite and an idol of the Wednesday supporters, scoring 149 goals in 358 appearances during his eleven years at the club. He was capped three times for England, and scored once. He even managed to score and keep a clean sheet in the same match, (a 2–0 victory over Manchester City in January 1990) after he replaced an injured Kevin Pressman in goal.

In 1991, Hirst scored 32 goals as Wednesday were promoted back to the First Division at the first attempt, including a 4-goal haul against Hull City (a 5–1 win) on 1 September 1990. This form led to him being called up for the England B international against Switzerland, in which he scored both England goals in a 2–1 win. He was subsequently called into the full England squad for the tour of Australasia. He helped the Owls finish third in the league in 1992, and finish seventh in three of the first five seasons of the Premier League, as well as enjoying a few more cup runs.

Manchester United boss Alex Ferguson tried six times to tempt Owls boss Trevor Francis to sell Hirst during the first half of the 1990s, but without success. Two of these occasions were in 1992. First, after a shortage of goals in the second half of the 1991–92 season had cost United the championship, Ferguson attempted to sign Hirst during the close season, but the offer was refused. In November 1992, with United's title challenge flagging once again due to a shortage of goals, Ferguson offered the Owls around £3.5million for Hirst, but the offer was rejected and United signed Eric Cantona instead.

In late 1992 during a game at Highbury, Hirst suffered a broken ankle. It was the start of his injury problems. He still scored in the game and managed 16 goals in 33 games that season. In the same season Hirst played in the Sheffield Wednesday team that reached both domestic Finals – they lost both to Arsenal, but Hirst scored Wednesday's equaliser in the FA Cup Final at Wembley in a 1–1 draw before Arsenal won the replay 2–1.

The injuries mounted up and from August 1993 to May 1995 he played just 25 games and scored five goals. After two more years at Hillsborough and the odd glimpses of form from Hirst, he was sold by manager David Pleat to Southampton after he had emerged fit once again returning to the Owls first team.

=== Southampton ===
His exit from the Owls came on 17 October 1997, when Southampton manager Dave Jones paid a club record £2million for his services. He made his debut the next day in a 1–0 home defeat by Blackburn Rovers in the league, and in his first season at The Dell scored nine times in 28 league games as the Saints finished 11th in the Premier League. Highlights of this season include scoring twice against Tottenham Hotspur in his second appearance, and scoring twice again as Southampton beat Liverpool at Anfield. Hirst also scored the only goal as his side beat Leeds United 1–0 at Elland Road.

However, his injury problems returned in the 1998–99 season and he played just twice – these games were the last of his career. He retired from playing on 26 January 2000, at the age of 32, after being advised to do so by medical experts.

== International career ==
He made his international debut in the 1–0 win over Australia, but was replaced at half-time. He was named as a substitute in the next game against New Zealand. He came on at half-time and within three minutes of the restart he scored his first (and only) England goal. With Gary Lineker rested, he lined up with Alan Shearer against France at Wembley. Graham Taylor said, "It's not a question of who will replace Lineker, but who will partner David Hirst".. England won the game 2-0 with Shearer scoring just before half time. Hirst was replaced by Lineker at the break, who also scored. It became Hirst's third and final England match. Although he was selected for more England squads, injuries kept him out of the team.

== Coaching career ==
In April 2013, Hirst was appointed as a coach in the Sheffield Wednesday academy set up. He also held a similar position with Crystal Palace.

== Personal life ==
Hirst is of Scottish descent through his father. David is the father of professional footballer George Hirst.

He has worked as a corporate hospitality host for Sheffield Wednesday during recent seasons.

== Style of play ==
Hirst was widely regarded by contemporary commentators and peers as a versatile "complete forward," possessing a combination of physical presence, technical ability, and tactical awareness. Standing 5 ft 11 in (1.80 m), he combined aerial ability and strength with notable explosive pace and dribbling skills. Though predominantly left-footed, he was proficient with both feet and gained a reputation for scoring long-range goals.

Hirst previously held the record for the fastest recorded shot, hitting the bar at 114 mph against Arsenal at Highbury in September 1996.

== Career statistics ==
Score and result list England's goal tally first, score column indicates score after Hirst goal.

International goal scored by David Hirst
No.	Date	Venue	Opponent	Score	Result	Competition
1	8 June 1991	Athletic Park, Wellington, New Zealand	New Zealand	2–0	2–0	Friendly

== Honours ==
Sheffield Wednesday

- Football League Cup: 1990–91; runner-up: 1992–93
- FA Cup runner-up: 1992–93

Individual

- PFA Team of the Year: 1990–91 Second Division
