= Andy Gray (footballer, born 1964) =

English footballer and manager (born 1964)

Personal information
- Full name: Andrew Arthur Gray
- Date of birth: 22 February 1964 (age 62)
- Place of birth: Lambeth, England
- Height: 1.78 m (5 ft 10 in)
- Positions: Midfielder; striker

Youth career
- 1980–1981: Crystal Palace

Senior career*
Years	Team	Apps	(Gls)
198?–198?	Corinthian Casuals	34	(1)
198?–1984	Dulwich Hamlet	?	(?)
1984–1987	Crystal Palace	98	(27)
1987–1989	Aston Villa	37	(4)
1989	Queens Park Rangers	11	(2)
1989–1992	Crystal Palace	90	(12)
1992–1994	Tottenham Hotspur	33	(3)
1992	→ Swindon Town (loan)	3	(0)
1994–1995	CA Marbella	33	(2)
1995–1997	Falkirk	34	(1)
1997–1998	Bury	21	(1)
1998	Millwall	12	(1)
Total		305	(50)

International career
1988	England U21	2	(0)
1991	England	1	(0)

Managerial career
- 2023: Corinthian-Casuals
- * Club domestic league appearances and goals

Andrew Arthur Gray (born 22 February 1964) is an English former footballer who played in the centre of midfield or as a striker during his career.

Gray made over 300 appearances in his senior career, with his longest stays being with Crystal Palace and Aston Villa. Gray totalled 50 goals in his career.

== Playing career ==
After playing for Crystal Palace's youth team in 1980–81, Gray moved into non-league football with Corinthian Casuals and Dulwich Hamlet where he was spotted by Crystal Palace manager Steve Coppell.

Gray moved to Palace and quickly became a regular in the team, playing in the forward positions. In the 1985–86 season, Gray top-scored with 11 goals. However, after the signings of Ian Wright and Mark Bright, Gray moved into central-midfield, and his career came alight.

Gray then achieved promotion with Aston Villa and had a spell at Queens Park Rangers, before returning to Selhurst Park for the 1989–90 season. In the league Palace survived comfortably, and they found themselves in an FA Cup semi-final against champions Liverpool, who were gunning for a league and cup double. Having led 2–1 at one point, Palace were 3–2 down, and were on the verge of leaving Villa Park with their heads down, before Gray jumped forward to head an 87th-minute equaliser. Alan Pardew's goal in extra-time ensured that Gray and his Palace teammates would get to play in the FA Cup Final.

The final would be against Manchester United, and in the match Gray played well as Palace secured a 3–3 draw. In the replay, Palace were beaten by a single goal: 1–0.

The following season, Palace achieved far more than even the biggest optimists expected. The Eagles chased Liverpool and Arsenal until the end, but had to settle for third place in the First Division. As well as this, they picked up silverware, in winning the Full Members Cup.

In November 1991, Gray's play was rewarded with a call-up to the England team, and he made his solitary international appearance against Poland in a crucial qualifier for EURO '92. He started the game, but was substituted off at half-time.

Gray left Palace in March of the 1991–92 season, after their form slumped following the sale of Ian Wright, and went to Tottenham Hotspur for £900,000. Whilst at Tottenham he was involved in a dramatic game against Chelsea; he scored a penalty to level the game at 3-3 and moments later Spurs were awarded another penalty but this time Dmitri Kharine saved Gray's effort. Chelsea went on to win 4–3. His spell at Spurs would be less successful and, following a loan move to Swindon Town, he was sold to CA Marbella for an undisclosed fee. He would round out his career with short spells at Falkirk, where he played in the 1997 Scottish Cup Final, Bury, and Millwall.

== Later career ==
In 2006, Gray was appointed as the technical director of the Sierra Leone national football team.

In 2005, Andy was voted in Palace's Centenary XI.

In 2019 and 2020, Gray featured as a guest substitute player in both seasons of ITV show Harry's Heroes, which featured former football manager Harry Redknapp attempting get a squad of former England international footballers back fit and healthy for a game against Germany legends.

In March 2023 Gray was appointed manager of Corinthian Casuals for the 2023–24 season. However, he left the club in December 2023.

== Honours ==
Crystal Palace

- Full Members' Cup: 1990–91
- FA Cup runner-up: 1989–90

Individual

- PFA Team of the Year: 1987–88 Second Division
