= John Salako =

English footballer and pundit

Personal information
- Full name: John Akin Salako
- Date of birth: 11 February 1969 (age 57)
- Place of birth: Ibadan, Nigeria
- Height: 1.75 m (5 ft 9 in)
- Positions: Winger; attacking midfielder

Youth career
- Westerham Reds
- Westerham
- Crystal Palace

Senior career*
Years	Team	Apps	(Gls)
1986–1995	Crystal Palace	215	(22)
1989	→ Swansea City (loan)	13	(3)
1995–1998	Coventry City	72	(4)
1998	→ Bolton Wanderers (loan)	7	(0)
1998–1999	Fulham	10	(1)
1999–2001	Charlton Athletic	47	(2)
2001–2004	Reading	111	(13)
2004–2005	Brentford	35	(4)
Total		510	(49)

International career
1991	England	5	(0)

Managerial career
- 2009–2015: Crystal Palace (U16s)
- 2015–2016: Crystal Palace (first team coach)
- * Club domestic league appearances and goals

John Akin Salako (born 11 February 1969) is an English former professional football player, coach, and sports television pundit.

Born in Nigeria, Salako played as a winger or attacking midfielder between 1986 and 2005. He played in the Premier League for Crystal Palace, Coventry City, Bolton Wanderers and Charlton Athletic, and in the Football League for Swansea City, Fulham, Reading and Brentford. Salako represented England at senior level, earning five caps, all during 1991 while he was a Crystal Palace player.

In 2005, Salako was voted into Palace's Centenary XI.

== Playing career ==
A fast and imaginative player, Salako began his career at Crystal Palace in the mid 1980s, and was their regular left winger by the time they won promotion to the First Division in 1989. He was also in the side for the 1990 FA Cup Final, picking up a runners-up medal after they drew 3–3 with Manchester United before losing the replay 1–0. A year later, Salako helped Palace achieve their highest ever finish of third in the top flight in the 1990–91 season and he memorably scored twice for the Eagles in a 3–0 home win over Manchester United in the league.

However, a serious knee injury suffered in a league match against Leeds United ruled him out until the following season, when Palace were founder members of the FA Premier League. They finished the season relegated, with Salako often being positioned as a centre forward alongside Chris Armstrong after the sale of Ian Wright and Mark Bright. Salako helped them get straight back up, but they went down again the following season despite reaching the semi-finals of both cups.

Salako left Palace in the summer of 1995, signing for Coventry City. He spent three seasons at Coventry, including a brief spell on loan at Bolton Wanderers, before signing for Fulham in Division Two. At Fulham he scored twice, once in the league against Macclesfield, and again in the League Cup against Cardiff City. After Fulham, he played for Charlton Athletic and Reading, before ending his career at Brentford.

== Coaching career ==
He has previously coached the Crystal Palace under 16 team between 2009 and 2015, working with former teammate Mark Bright. On 8 August 2015, he was announced as Crystal Palace first team coach, but left after only one season.

== Media career ==
Salako previously worked as a matchday correspondent on Sky Sports.

== Personal life ==
As a teenager, he lived in Westerham, Kent and was a student at The Wildernesse School in Sevenoaks. His brother Andy Salako was also a professional footballer.

== Honours ==
=== As a player ===
Crystal Palace

- Football League First Division: 1993–94
- Full Members' Cup: 1990–91
- FA Cup runner-up: 1989–90

Fulham

- Football League Second Division: 1998–99

Charlton Athletic

- Football League First Division: 1999–2000

Reading

- Football League Second Division runner-up: 2001–02

Individual

- Crystal Palace Young Player of the Year: 1986–87, 1987–88

== See also ==
- List of England international footballers born outside England
