= 1994–95 Crystal Palace F.C. season =

English football club season

Crystal Palace F.C.
1994–95 season
- Chairman: Ron Noades
- Manager: Alan Smith
- Stadium: Selhurst Park
- FA Premier League: 19th (relegated)
- FA Cup: Semi-finals
- League Cup: Semi-finals
- Top goalscorer: League: Chris Armstrong (8); All: Chris Armstrong (19)
- Highest home attendance: 18,224 vs Manchester United (25 Jan 1995, Premier League) vs Liverpool (8 Mar 1995, League Cup)
- Lowest home attendance: 6,541 vs Lincoln City (8 Jan 1995, FA Cup)
- Average home league attendance: 14,992
Home colours

During the 1994–95 English football season, Crystal Palace competed in the FA Premier League.

== Season summary ==
Crystal Palace returned to the Premier League a year after leaving it, and, over the next few months, they would experience one of the most unusual seasons in their history. They were the division's lowest scoring team with just 34 goals, but reached the semi-finals of both cup competitions. They also finished fourth from bottom in the Premier League, which – due to the streamlining of the division to 20 clubs – cost them their top flight status. Manager Alan Smith was sacked just days afterwards, with Steve Coppell returning to the manager's seat two years after handing the reins over to his former assistant Smith.

The aftermath of Palace's relegation saw the sale of numerous players including Richard Shaw, John Salako, Chris Armstrong and Gareth Southgate. A barely recognisable Palace squad would kick off the Endsleigh League Division One campaign with one of the youngest-ever squads to be faced with a challenge for promotion to the Premier League.

== Final league table ==
Pos	Team	Pld	W	D	L	GF	GA	GD	Pts	Qualification or relegation
17	Manchester City	42	12	13	17	53	64	−11	49	
18	Aston Villa	42	11	15	16	51	56	−5	48	
19	Crystal Palace (R)	42	11	12	19	34	49	−15	45	Relegation to Football League First Division
20	Norwich City (R)	42	10	13	19	37	54	−17	43	Relegation to Football League First Division
21	Leicester City (R)	42	6	11	25	45	80	−35	29	Relegation to Football League First Division

Source: Premier League
Rules for classification: 1) points; 2) goal difference; 3) number of goals scored.
(R) Relegated

Results summary

Overall								Home						Away					
Pld	W	D	L	GF	GA	GD	Pts	W	D	L	GF	GA	GD	W	D	L	GF	GA	GD
42	11	12	19	34	49	−15	45	6	6	9	16	23	−7	5	6	10	18	26	−8

Source: Statto

Results by round

Round	1	2	3	4	5	6	7	8	9	10	11	12	13	14	15	16	17	18	19	20	21	22	23	24	25	26	27	28	29	30	31	32	33	34	35	36	37	38	39	40	41	42
Ground	H	A	A	H	A	H	H	A	A	H	H	A	A	H	A	H	A	A	H	H	A	H	A	H	A	H	A	H	H	A	H	A	H	H	H	A	A	H	A	H	A	A
Result	L	D	D	L	D	D	L	W	L	L	W	W	W	W	L	D	L	D	L	D	D	L	L	W	L	D	W	L	L	D	W	L	W	D	D	W	L	L	L	W	L	L
Position	22	20	18	18	17	21	21	16	19	21	17	16	12	10	12	13	15	13	16	17	16	18	18	16	17	16	16	18	19	20	18	19	18	19	20	19	19	19	19	19	19	19

Source: Statto.com
A = Away; H = Home; W = Win; D = Draw; L = Loss

== Results ==
Crystal Palace's score comes first

=== Legend ===
Win	Draw	Loss

=== FA Premier League ===
Date	Opponent	Venue	Result	Attendance	Scorers
20 August 1994	Liverpool	H	1–6	18,084	Armstrong
24 August 1994	Norwich City	A	0–0	19,015	
27 August 1994	Aston Villa	A	1–1	23,305	Southgate
30 August 1994	Leeds United	H	1–2	13,654	Gordon
10 September 1994	Manchester City	A	1–1	19,971	Dyer
17 September 1994	Wimbledon	H	0–0	12,100	
24 September 1994	Chelsea	H	0–1	16,030	
1 October 1994	Arsenal	A	2–1	34,136	Salako (2)
8 October 1994	West Ham United	A	0–1	16,959	
15 October 1994	Newcastle United	H	0–1	17,760	
22 October 1994	Everton	H	1–0	14,505	Preece
29 October 1994	Leicester City	A	1–0	20,022	Preece
2 November 1994	Coventry City	A	4–1	10,732	Preece (2), Salako, Newman
5 November 1994	Ipswich Town	H	3–0	13,349	Newman, Armstrong, Salako
19 November 1994	Manchester United	A	0–3	43,788	
26 November 1994	Southampton	H	0–0	14,007	
3 December 1994	Sheffield Wednesday	A	0–1	21,930	
11 December 1994	Liverpool	A	0–0	30,972	
17 December 1994	Norwich City	H	0–1	12,252	
26 December 1994	Queens Park Rangers	H	0–0	16,372	
27 December 1994	Tottenham Hotspur	A	0–0	27,730	
31 December 1994	Blackburn Rovers	H	0–1	14,232	
2 January 1995	Nottingham Forest	A	0–1	21,326	
14 January 1995	Leicester City	H	2–0	12,707	Newman, Ndah
21 January 1995	Everton	A	1–3	23,733	Coleman
25 January 1995	Manchester United	H	1–1	18,224	Southgate
4 February 1995	Ipswich Town	A	2–0	15,570	Dowie, Gordon (pen)
11 February 1995	Coventry City	H	0–2	11,871	
25 February 1995	Arsenal	H	0–3	17,092	
5 March 1995	Chelsea	A	0–0	14,130	
14 March 1995	Sheffield Wednesday	H	2–1	10,422	Armstrong, Dowie
18 March 1995	Wimbledon	A	0–2	8,835	
1 April 1995	Manchester City	H	2–1	13,312	Armstrong, Patterson
4 April 1995	Aston Villa	H	0–0	12,606	
14 April 1995	Tottenham Hotspur	H	1–1	18,149	Armstrong
17 April 1995	Queens Park Rangers	A	1–0	14,227	Dowie
20 April 1995	Blackburn Rovers	A	1–2	28,005	Houghton
29 April 1995	Nottingham Forest	H	1–2	15,886	Dowie
3 May 1995	Southampton	A	1–3	15,151	Southgate
6 May 1995	West Ham United	H	1–0	14,227	Armstrong
9 May 1995	Leeds United	A	1–3	30,942	Armstrong
14 May 1995	Newcastle United	A	2–3	35,626	Armstrong, Houghton

=== FA Cup ===
Round	Date	Opponent	Venue	Result	Attendance	Goalscorers
R3	8 January 1995	Lincoln City	H	5–1	6,541	Coleman, Armstrong, Gordon (pen), Salako (2)
R4	28 January 1995	Nottingham Forest	A	2–1	16,790	Armstrong, Dowie
R5	18 February 1995	Watford	A	0–0	13,814	
R5R	1 March 1995	Watford	H	1–0	10,321	Ndah
QF	11 March 1995	Wolverhampton Wanderers	H	1–1	14,604	Dowie
QFR	22 March 1995	Wolverhampton Wanderers	A	4–1	27,548	Armstrong (2), Pitcher, Dowie
SF	9 April 1995	Manchester United	N	2–2	38,256	Dowie, Armstrong
SFR	12 April 1995	Manchester United	N	0–2	17,987	

=== League Cup ===
Round	Date	Opponent	Venue	Result	Attendance	Goalscorers
R2 1st Leg	20 September 1994	Lincoln City	A	0–1	4,310	
R2 2nd Leg	4 October 1994	Lincoln City	H	3–0 (won 3–1 on agg)	6,870	Gordon, Armstrong, Dyer
R3	25 October 1994	Wimbledon	A	1–0	9,394	Armstrong
R4	30 November 1994	Aston Villa	H	4–1	12,653	Armstrong (2), Southgate (2)
R5	11 January 1995	Manchester City	H	4–0	16,668	Pitcher, Salako, Preece, Armstrong
SF 1st Leg	15 February 1995	Liverpool	A	0–1	25,480	
SF 2nd Leg	8 March 1995	Liverpool	H	0–1 (lost 0–2 on agg)	18,224	

== Players ==
=== First-team squad ===
Squad at end of season

Note: Flags indicate national team as defined under FIFA eligibility rules; some limited exceptions apply. Players may hold more than one non-FIFA nationality.

No.	Pos.	Nation	Player
1	GK	ENG	Nigel Martyn
2	DF	ENG	John Humphrey
3	DF	ENG	Dean Gordon
4	MF	ENG	Gareth Southgate (captain)
5	DF	WAL	Eric Young (Note: Young was born in Singapore, but qualified to represent any of the home nations internationally as a British passport holder and made his international debut for Wales in May 1990.)
6	DF	WAL	Chris Coleman
7	MF	ENG	Simon Rodger
8	FW	NIR	Iain Dowie (Note: Dowie was born in Hatfield, England, but also qualified to represent Northern Ireland internationally through his father and made his international debut for Northern Ireland in 1990.)
9	FW	ENG	Chris Armstrong
10	FW	ENG	Bruce Dyer (Note: Dyer was born in Redbridge, England, and represented them at U-21 level, but played a friendly game for Montserrat against Ashford Town in September 2007.)
11	MF	ENG	John Salako (Note: Salako was born in Ibadan, Nigeria, but also qualified to represent England internationally and made his international debut for England in 1991.)
12	MF	ENG	Damian Matthew
14	DF	ENG	Richard Shaw

No.	Pos.	Nation	Player
15	MF	ENG	Bobby Bowry (Note: Bowry was born in Croydon, England, but also qualified to represent Saint Kitts and Nevis internationally and would make his international debut for Saint Kitts and Nevis in 2000.)
16	MF	ENG	Darren Pitcher
17	FW	ENG	Paul Williams
18	FW	ENG	Andy Preece
19	GK	WAL	Rhys Wilmot
20	MF	IRL	Ray Houghton (Note: Houghton was born in Glasgow, Scotland, but also qualified to represent the Republic of Ireland internationally through his father and made his international debut for the Republic of Ireland in March 1986.)
21	DF	ENG	Ian Cox (Note: Cox was born in Croydon, England, but also qualified to represent Trinidad and Tobago internationally and would make his international debut for Trinidad and Tobago in 2000.)
22	DF	NIR	Darren Patterson
23	MF	ENG	Ricky Newman
24	FW	ENG	George Ndah (Note: Ndah was born in Southwark, England, but also qualified to represent Nigeria internationally and was called up by Nigeria in 1999, but was prevented from playing due to injury.)
25	GK	ENG	Jimmy Glass
26	MF	IRL	Brian Launders

=== Left club during season ===
Note: Flags indicate national team as defined under FIFA eligibility rules; some limited exceptions apply. Players may hold more than one non-FIFA nationality.

No.	Pos.	Nation	Player
8	MF	ENG	Ray Wilkins (to Queens Park Rangers)
20	DF	ENG	Andy Thorn (to Wimbledon)

No.	Pos.	Nation	Player
—	MF	ENG	Glen Little (on loan to Derry City)

=== Reserve squad ===
Note: Flags indicate national team as defined under FIFA eligibility rules; some limited exceptions apply. Players may hold more than one non-FIFA nationality.

No.	Pos.	Nation	Player
—	DF	ENG	Jamie Vincent
—	DF	ENG	Danny Boxall (Note: Boxall was born in Croydon, England, but also qualified to represent the Republic of Ireland internationally and would later represent them at U-21 level.)
—	MF	SWE	Björn Enqvist
—	MF	ENG	Glen Little

No.	Pos.	Nation	Player
—	MF	IRL	Rob Quinn (Note: Quinn was born in Bexley, England, but also qualified to represent the Republic of Ireland internationally and would represent them at U-21 and B level.)
—	MF	IRL	Tony Scully
—	FW	SCO	Kevin Hall
—	DF	ENG	Paul Sparrow

== Transfers ==
=== In ===
Date	Pos	Name	From	Fee
26 May 1994	MF	Ray Wilkins	QPR	Free transfer
23 June 1994	FW	Andy Preece	Stockport County	£350,000
5 July 1994	MF	Darren Pitcher	Charlton Athletic	£700,000
9 August 1994	GK	Rhys Wilmot	Grimsby Town	£80,000
13 January 1995	FW	Iain Dowie	Southampton	£400,000
10 February 1995	MF	Björn Enqvist	Malmö FF	Signed
23 March 1995	MF	Ray Houghton	Aston Villa	£300,000

=== Out ===
Date	Pos	Name	To	Fee
4 July 1994	GK	Andy Woodman	Exeter City	Free transfer
5 July 1994	MF	Stuart Massey	Oxford United	Free transfer
5 July 1994	FW	David Whyte	Charlton Athletic	£450,000
5 July 1994	MF	Paul Mortimer	Charlton Athletic	£200,000
16 August 1994	MF	Mark Hawthorne	Sheffield United	Free transfer
17 August 1994	MF	Simon Osborn	Reading	£90,000
5 October 1994	DF	Andy Thorn	Wimbledon	Free transfer
17 November 1994	MF	Ray Wilkins	QPR	Free transfer

Transfers in: ▼£1,830,000
Transfers out: ▲£740,000
Total spending: ▼£1,090,000
