= 1992–93 Crystal Palace F.C. season =

English football club season

Crystal Palace
1992–93 season
- Chairman: Ron Noades
- Manager: Steve Coppell
- Stadium: Selhurst Park
- Premier League: 20th (relegated)
- FA Cup: Third round
- League Cup: Semi-finals
- Top goalscorer: Armstrong (15)
- Average home league attendance: 15,748
Home colours	Away colours

During the 1992–93 English football season, Crystal Palace F.C. competed in the inaugural season of the FA Premier League.

== Season summary ==
A breakaway by the top 22 clubs saw Palace become founder members of the new FA Premier League for the 1992–93 season. However, they would be without the services of another key player – Mark Bright – who was sold to Sheffield Wednesday and the Eagles struggled to score goals without him. They were relegated on goal difference, after Oldham Athletic's 4–3 victory over Southampton. Palace's 49 points from 42 games that season became the joint-highest total of any club ever to have been relegated from the top flight of English football, and remains a Premier League record. Palace's drop prompted the resignation of manager Steve Coppell after nine years at the helm, and he was succeeded by his assistant Alan Smith.

== Final league table ==
Pos	Team	Pld	W	D	L	GF	GA	GD	Pts	Qualification or relegation
18	Southampton	42	13	11	18	54	61	−7	50	
19	Oldham Athletic	42	13	10	19	63	74	−11	49	
20	Crystal Palace (R)	42	11	16	15	48	61	−13	49	Relegation to Football League First Division
21	Middlesbrough (R)	42	11	11	20	54	75	−21	44	Relegation to Football League First Division
22	Nottingham Forest (R)	42	10	10	22	41	62	−21	40	Relegation to Football League First Division

Source: Premier League
Rules for classification: 1) points; 2) goal difference; 3) number of goals scored.
(R) Relegated

== Results ==
Crystal Palace's score comes first

=== Legend ===
Win	Draw	Loss

=== FA Premier League ===
Date	Opponent	Venue	Result	Attendance	Scorers
15 August 1992	Blackburn Rovers	H	3–3	17,086	Bright, Southgate, Osborn
19 August 1992	Oldham Athletic	A	1–1	11,063	McGoldrick
22 August 1992	Tottenham Hotspur	A	2–2	25,237	McGoldrick, Young
25 August 1992	Sheffield Wednesday	H	1–1	14,005	Young
29 August 1992	Norwich City	H	1–2	12,033	McGoldrick
2 September 1992	Manchester United	A	0–1	29,736	
5 September 1992	Aston Villa	A	0–3	17,120	
12 September 1992	Oldham Athletic	H	2–2	11,224	Armstrong (2)
19 September 1992	Everton	A	2–0	18,080	Armstrong (2)
26 September 1992	Southampton	H	1–2	13,829	Young
3 October 1992	Coventry City	A	2–2	11,808	Coleman, McGoldrick
17 October 1992	Manchester City	H	0–0	14,005	
24 October 1992	Ipswich Town	A	2–2	17,861	Armstrong, Coleman
2 November 1992	Arsenal	H	1–2	20,287	McGoldrick
7 November 1992	Chelsea	A	1–3	17,141	Young
21 November 1992	Nottingham Forest	H	1–1	15,330	Armstrong
28 November 1992	Liverpool	A	0–5	36,380	
5 December 1992	Sheffield United	H	2–0	12,361	Armstrong, Southgate
12 December 1992	Queens Park Rangers	A	3–1	14,571	McGoldrick (2), Armstrong
20 December 1992	Leeds United	H	1–0	14,462	Thorn
26 December 1992	Wimbledon	H	2–0	16,825	Coleman, Thomas
28 December 1992	Middlesbrough	A	1–0	21,123	Osborn
9 January 1993	Everton	H	0–2	13,227	
16 January 1993	Southampton	A	0–1	13,397	
27 January 1993	Norwich City	A	2–4	13,543	Armstrong, Thomas
30 January 1993	Tottenham Hotspur	H	1–3	20,937	Ruddock (own goal)
2 February 1993	Blackburn Rovers	A	2–1	14,163	Armstrong, Rodger
10 February 1993	Aston Villa	H	1–0	12,270	Bowry
20 February 1993	Sheffield Wednesday	A	1–2	26,459	Armstrong
27 February 1993	Coventry City	H	0–0	12,248	
3 March 1993	Nottingham Forest	A	1–1	20,603	Southgate
15 March 1993	Chelsea	H	1–1	12,610	Armstrong
20 March 1993	Sheffield United	A	1–0	18,857	Coleman
23 March 1993	Liverpool	H	1–1	18,688	Armstrong
3 April 1993	Queens Park Rangers	H	1–1	14,705	Bardsley (own goal)
9 April 1993	Wimbledon	A	0–4	12,275	
12 April 1993	Middlesbrough	H	4–1	15,123	Rodger, Young, Armstrong, Coleman
17 April 1993	Leeds United	A	0–0	27,545	
21 April 1993	Manchester United	H	0–2	30,115	
1 May 1993	Ipswich Town	H	3–1	18,881	Young, Armstrong, McGoldrick
5 May 1993	Manchester City	A	0–0	21,167	
8 May 1993	Arsenal	A	0–3	25,225	

=== FA Cup ===
Round	Date	Opponent	Venue	Result	Attendance	Goalscorers
R3	2 January 1993	Hartlepool United	A	0–1	6,721	

=== League Cup ===
Round	Date	Opponent	Venue	Result	Attendance	Goalscorers
R2 First Leg	22 September 1992	Lincoln City	H	3–1	6,947	Southgate, Salako, McGoldrick
R2 Second Leg	6 October 1992	Lincoln City	A	1–1 (won 4–2 on agg)	6,255	Southgate
R3	28 October 1992	Southampton	A	2–0	9,060	McGoldrick, Salako
R4	1 December 1992	Liverpool	A	1–1	18,525	Coleman 56'
R4R	16 December 1992	Liverpool	H	2–1 (a.e.t.)	19,662	Watts 14', Thorn 101'
QF	6 January 1993	Chelsea	H	3–1	28,510	Coleman 4', Ndah 34', Watts 47'
SF First Leg	7 February 1993	Arsenal	H	1–3	26,508	Osborn (pen) 54'
SF Second Leg	10 March 1993	Arsenal	A	0–2 (lost 1–5 on agg)	28,584	

== Players ==
=== First-team squad ===
Squad at end of season

Note: Flags indicate national team as defined under FIFA eligibility rules; some limited exceptions apply. Players may hold more than one non-FIFA nationality.

Pos.	Nation	Player
GK	ENG	Nigel Martyn
GK	ENG	Andy Woodman
DF	ENG	Dean Gordon
DF	ENG	John Humphrey
DF	ENG	Richard Shaw
DF	ENG	Lee Sinnott
DF	ENG	Gareth Southgate (captain)
DF	ENG	Andy Thorn
DF	WAL	Chris Coleman
DF	WAL	Eric Young (Note: Young was born in Singapore, but qualified to represent any of the home nations internationally as a British passport holder and made his international debut for Wales in May 1990.)
MF	ENG	Bobby Bowry
MF	SCO	Mark Hawthorne

Pos.	Nation	Player
MF	ENG	Stuart Massey
MF	ENG	Paul Mortimer
MF	ENG	Ricky Newman
MF	ENG	Simon Osborn
MF	ENG	Simon Rodger
MF	ENG	John Salako
MF	ENG	Geoff Thomas (captain)
MF	IRL	Eddie McGoldrick (Note: McGoldrick was born in Islington, England, but also qualified to represent the Republic of Ireland internationally and made his international debut for the Republic of Ireland in 1992.)
FW	ENG	Chris Armstrong
FW	ENG	George Ndah (Note: Ndah was born in Southwark, England, but also qualified to represent Nigeria internationally and was called up by Nigeria in 1999, but was prevented from playing due to injury.)
FW	ENG	Grant Watts
FW	ENG	Paul Williams

=== Left club during season ===
Note: Flags indicate national team as defined under FIFA eligibility rules; some limited exceptions apply. Players may hold more than one non-FIFA nationality.

Pos.	Nation	Player
FW	ENG	Mark Bright (to Sheffield Wednesday)
FW	ENG	Stan Collymore (to Southend United)

Pos.	Nation	Player
FW	ENG	David Whyte (on loan to Charlton Athletic)

=== Reserve squad ===
The following players did not appear for the first team this season.

Note: Flags indicate national team as defined under FIFA eligibility rules; some limited exceptions apply. Players may hold more than one non-FIFA nationality.

Pos.	Nation	Player
GK	ENG	Jimmy Glass
DF	NIR	Darren Patterson
MF	ENG	Martin O'Connor (Note: O'Connor was born in Walsall, England, but made his international debut for the Cayman Islands in 2000, but it was later discovered that he was not eligible to represent them.)

Pos.	Nation	Player
FW	CAN	Niall Thompson (Note: Thompson was born in Birmingham, England, but was raised in Canada from the age of 2 and made his international debut for Canada in March 1993.)
FW	ENG	David Whyte
