= 1993–94 Crystal Palace F.C. season =

English football club season

Crystal Palace
1993–94 season
- Chairman: Ron Noades
- Manager: Alan Smith
- Stadium: Selhurst Park
- First Division: 1st (champions)
- FA Cup: Third round
- League Cup: Third round
- Top goalscorer: League: Armstrong (22); All: Armstrong (24)
- Average home league attendance: 15,656
Home colours

During the 1993–94 English football season, Crystal Palace F.C. competed in the Football League First Division.

== Season summary ==
Smith immediately guided Palace back to the Premier League as runaway champions of the second tier, Chris Armstrong top-scoring with 22 league goals. During this period the badge was changed with the bird being replaced by one which Ron Noades felt more closely resembled an eagle.

== Final league table ==
Pos	Team	Pld	W	D	L	GF	GA	GD	Pts	Qualification or relegation
1	Crystal Palace (C, P)	46	27	9	10	73	46	+27	90	Promotion to the Premier League
2	Nottingham Forest (P)	46	23	14	9	74	49	+25	83	Promotion to the Premier League
3	Millwall	46	19	17	10	58	49	+9	74	Qualification for the First Division play-offs
4	Leicester City (O, P)	46	19	16	11	72	59	+13	73	Qualification for the First Division play-offs
5	Tranmere Rovers	46	21	9	16	69	53	+16	72	Qualification for the First Division play-offs

Source: rsssf.com
Rules for classification: 1) Points; 2) Goals scored; 3) Goal difference
(C) Champions; (O) Play-off winners; (P) Promoted

== Results ==
Crystal Palace's score comes first

=== Legend ===
Win	Draw	Loss

=== Football League First Division ===
Date	Opponent	Venue	Result	Attendance	Scorers
14 August 1993	Tranmere Rovers	H	0–0	14,785	
21 August 1993	Bristol City	A	0–2	12,068	
24 August 1993	Nottingham Forest	H	2–0	15,048	Young, Gordon
28 August 1993	Portsmouth	H	5–1	14,428	Armstrong (3), Gordon, Southgate
31 August 1993	Birmingham City	A	4–2	13,856	Williams, Shaw, Armstrong (2)
12 September 1993	Sunderland	H	1–0	11,318	Armstrong
18 September 1993	West Bromwich Albion	A	4–1	17,873	Coleman, Whyte, Armstrong, Southgate
26 September 1993	Charlton Athletic	A	0–0	7,947	
2 October 1993	Stoke City	H	4–1	12,880	Salako (3), Southgate
17 October 1993	Wolverhampton Wanderers	H	1–1	13,056	Humphrey
23 October 1993	Derby County	A	1–3	16,586	Armstrong
30 October 1993	Grimsby Town	H	1–0	12,202	Southgate
2 November 1993	Luton Town	H	3–2	10,925	Shaw, Young, Whyte
6 November 1993	Notts County	A	2–3	6,904	Armstrong (2)
20 November 1993	Barnsley	A	3–1	5,384	Armstrong, Williams (2)
24 November 1993	Bolton Wanderers	A	0–1	7,845	
28 November 1993	Watford	A	3–1	7,485	Williams, Salako, Southgate
5 December 1993	Notts County	H	1–2	12,642	Osborn
8 December 1993	Leicester City	A	1–1	16,706	Williams
11 December 1993	Birmingham City	H	2–1	11,925	Southgate, Salako
19 December 1993	Tranmere Rovers	A	1–0	7,011	Williams
27 December 1993	Oxford United	A	3–1	10,356	Armstrong (2), Salako
29 December 1993	Southend United	H	1–0	18,255	Rodger
1 January 1994	Millwall	A	0–3	16,779	
15 January 1994	Wolverhampton Wanderers	A	0–2	23,851	
22 January 1994	Leicester City	H	2–1	17,045	Coleman, Armstrong
1 February 1994	Peterborough United	H	3–2	12,426	Rodger, Salako, Armstrong
5 February 1994	Derby County	H	1–1	15,615	Gordon
12 February 1994	Grimsby Town	A	1–1	6,302	Southgate
19 February 1994	Nottingham Forest	A	1–1	24,232	Matthew
22 February 1994	Bristol City	H	4–1	11,508	Salako, Gordon (pen), Armstrong (2)
26 February 1994	Bolton Wanderers	H	1–1	17,245	Southgate
5 March 1994	Portsmouth	A	1–0	13,508	Young
12 March 1994	West Bromwich Albion	H	1–0	16,576	Stewart
16 March 1994	Sunderland	A	0–1	15,892	
20 March 1994	Charlton Athletic	H	2–0	14,408	Armstrong, Stewart
23 March 1994	Middlesbrough	H	0–1	12,811	
26 March 1994	Stoke City	A	2–0	18,071	Gordon (pen), Williams
29 March 1994	Peterborough United	A	1–1	8,412	Rodger
2 April 1994	Oxford United	H	2–1	15,510	Armstrong, Stewart
6 April 1994	Southend United	A	2–1	9,776	Young, Armstrong
9 April 1994	Millwall	H	1–0	23,142	Armstrong
16 April 1994	Luton Town	A	1–0	9,880	Coleman
23 April 1994	Barnsley	H	1–0	20,522	Young
1 May 1994	Middlesbrough	A	3–2	8,638	Southgate, Armstrong, Whyte
8 May 1994	Watford	H	0–2	28,694	

=== FA Cup ===
Round	Date	Opponent	Venue	Result	Attendance	Goalscorers
R3	8 January 1994	Wolverhampton Wanderers	A	0–1	25,047	

=== League Cup ===
Round	Date	Opponent	Venue	Result	Attendance	Goalscorers
R2 First Leg	21 September 1993	Charlton Athletic	H	3–1	9,615	Gordon, Southgate, Whyte
R2 Second Leg	5 October 1993	Charlton Athletic	A	1–0 (won 4–1 on agg)	5,224	Armstrong
R3	26 October 1993	Everton	A	2–2	11,547	Southgate, Thorn
R3R	10 November 1993	Everton	H	1–4	14,662	Southgate

=== Anglo-Italian Cup ===
Round	Date	Opponent	Venue	Result	Attendance	Goalscorers
PR Group 8	7 September 1993	Charlton Athletic	A	1–4	3,868	
PR Group 8	14 September 1993	Millwall	H	3–0	2,712	Williams, Armstrong (pen), Whyte

== Players ==
=== First-team squad ===
Squad at end of season

Note: Flags indicate national team as defined under FIFA eligibility rules; some limited exceptions apply. Players may hold more than one non-FIFA nationality.

No.	Pos.	Nation	Player
—	GK	(England) ENG	Jimmy Glass
—	GK	(England) ENG	Nigel Martyn
—	GK	(England) ENG	Andy Woodman
—	DF	(England) ENG	Ian Cox (Note: Cox was born in Croydon, England, but also qualified to represent Trinidad and Tobago internationally and would make his international debut for Trinidad and Tobago in 2000.)
—	DF	(England) ENG	Dean Gordon
—	DF	(England) ENG	John Humphrey
—	DF	(England) ENG	Richard Shaw
—	DF	(England) ENG	Paul Sparrow
—	DF	(England) ENG	Gareth Southgate
—	DF	(England) ENG	Andy Thorn
—	DF	(England) ENG	Jamie Vincent
—	DF	(Wales) WAL	Chris Coleman
—	DF	(Wales) WAL	Eric Young (Note: Young was born in Singapore, but qualified to represent any of the home nations internationally as a British passport holder and made his international debut for Wales in May 1990.)
—	DF	(Northern Ireland) NIR	Darren Patterson
—	MF	(England) ENG	Bobby Bowry (Note: Bowry was born in Croydon, England, but also qualified to represent Saint Kitts and Nevis internationally and would make his international debut for Saint Kitts and Nevis in 2000.)
—	MF	(England) ENG	Damian Matthew

No.	Pos.	Nation	Player
—	MF	(England) ENG	Stuart Massey
—	MF	(England) ENG	Paul Mortimer
—	MF	(England) ENG	Ricky Newman
—	MF	(England) ENG	Martin O'Connor (Note: O'Connor was born in Walsall, England, but made his international debut for the Cayman Islands in 2000, but it was later discovered that he was not eligible to represent them.)
—	MF	(England) ENG	Simon Osborn
—	MF	(England) ENG	Simon Rodger
—	MF	(England) ENG	John Salako
—	MF	(Republic of Ireland) IRL	Tony Scully
—	FW	(England) ENG	Chris Armstrong
—	FW	(England) ENG	Bruce Dyer (Note: Dyer was born in Redbridge, England, and represented them at U-21 level, but also qualified to represent Montserrat internationally and would make his international debut for Montserrat in September 2007.)
—	FW	(England) ENG	George Ndah (Note: Ndah was born in Southwark, England, but also qualified to represent Nigeria internationally and was called up by Nigeria in 1999, but was prevented from playing due to injury.)
—	FW	(England) ENG	David Whyte
—	FW	(England) ENG	Paul Williams
—	FW	(Canada) CAN	Niall Thompson (Note: Thompson was born in Birmingham, England, but was raised in Canada from the age of 2 and made his international debut for Canada in March 1993.)
—	MF	(England) ENG	Paul Stewart (on loan from Liverpool)
