= 1995–96 Wolverhampton Wanderers F.C. season =

English football club season

Wolverhampton Wanderers
1995–96 season
- Chairman: Jonathan Hayward
- Manager: Graham Taylor (until 13 November); Mark McGhee (from 13 December)
- First Division: 20th
- FA Cup: 4th round
- League Cup: Quarter-finals
- Top goalscorer: League: Don Goodman (16); All: Don Goodman (20)
- Highest home attendance: 28,088 (vs Birmingham, 17 January 1996)
- Lowest home attendance: 20,381 (vs Fulham, 20 September 1995)
- Average home league attendance: 22,658 (league only)

The 1995–96 season was the 97th season of competitive league football in the history of English football club Wolverhampton Wanderers. They played the season in the second tier of the English football system, the Football League First Division.

Although the season began with Graham Taylor as manager, he resigned sixteen games into their league campaign under fan pressure due to the team's poor results. Despite being tipped by many to be one of the promotion favourites - following on from having reached the play-offs in the previous season - the side sat in 18th place at the time of Taylor's exit.

After a period under caretaker manager Bobby Downes, Mark McGhee resigned from Leicester City to become Wolves' new manager in December. Despite a slow upturn in results under McGhee that put the team within three points of a play-off place at the start of April, their form again collapsed and they took just four points from the final 24 available.

The club eventually finished the season in 20th place, only confirming their safety from relegation in their final home game. This represented their lowest finish in the football pyramid since returning to the second level in 1989–90.

== Results ==
=== Football League First Division ===
A total of 24 teams competed in the Football League First Division in the 1995–96 season. Each team played every other team twice: once at their stadium, and once at the opposition's. Three points were awarded to teams for each win, one point per draw, and none for defeats. Teams finishing level on points were firstly divided by the number of goals scored rather than goal difference.

The provisional fixture list was released on 20 June 1995, but was subject to change in the event of matches being selected for television coverage or police concerns.

12 August 1995 1	Tranmere Rovers	2–2	Wolverhampton Wanderers	Birkenhead
15:00 BST	O'Brien 51'; Aldridge 81'		Bull 40'; Goodman 53'	Stadium: Prenton Park; Attendance: 11,880 (2,986 away)

20 August 1995 2	Wolverhampton Wanderers	1–1	West Bromwich Albion	Wolverhampton
14:55 BST	Mardon 66' (o.g.)		Taylor 46'	Stadium: Molineux; Attendance: 26,329 (2,832 away)

26 August 1995 3	Sunderland	2–0	Wolverhampton Wanderers	Sunderland
15:00 BST	Melville 8'; Gray 28'			Stadium: Roker Park; Attendance: 16,816 (1,894 away)

30 August 1995 4	Wolverhampton Wanderers	3–0	Derby County	Wolverhampton
19:45 BST	Daley 12'; Goodman 16' de Wolf 32'			Stadium: Molineux; Attendance: 26,053 (1,500 away)

2 September 1995 5	Leicester City	1–0	Wolverhampton Wanderers	Leicester
15:00 BST	Whitlow 27'			Stadium: Filbert Street; Attendance: 18,441 (1,700 away)

9 September 1995 6	Wolverhampton Wanderers	4–1	Grimsby Town	Wolverhampton
15:00 BST	Bull 42', 69'; Goodman 51', 76'		Groves 39'	Stadium: Molineux; Attendance: 23,656 (603 away)

13 September 1995 7	Wolverhampton Wanderers	0–2	Norwich City	Wolverhampton
19:45 BST			Johnson 60'; Ward 70'	Stadium: Molineux; Attendance: 27,064 (1,236 away)

16 September 1995 8	Southend United	2–1	Wolverhampton Wanderers	Southend-on-Sea
15:00 BST	Gridelet 45'; Jones 73'		Goodman 29'	Stadium: Roots Hall; Attendance: 6,322 (1,986 away)

23 September 1995 9	Wolverhampton Wanderers	0–0	Luton Town	Wolverhampton
15:00 BST				Stadium: Molineux; Attendance: 23,659 (822 away)

30 September 1995 10	Port Vale	2–2	Wolverhampton Wanderers	Burslem
15:00 BST	Richards 37' (o.g.); Porter 61' (pen.)		Goodman 16'; Daley 31'	Stadium: Vale Park; Attendance: 11,550 (3,824 away)

7 October 1995 11	Ipswich Town	1–2	Wolverhampton Wanderers	Ipswich
15:00 BST	Sedgley 28' (pen.)		Goodman 38'; Atkins 42'	Stadium: Portman Road; Attendance: 15,335 (1,465 away)

14 October 1995 12	Wolverhampton Wanderers	1–4	Stoke City	Wolverhampton
15:00 BST	Thompson 71' (pen.)		Gleghorn 39'; Potter 41'; Wallace 85'; Carruthers 89'	Stadium: Molineux; Attendance: 26,483 (2,927 away)

21 October 1995 13	Watford	1–1	Wolverhampton Wanderers	Watford
15:00 BST	Holdsworth 57'		Daley 45'	Stadium: Vicarage Road; Attendance: 11,319 (1,269 away)

28 October 1995 14	Wolverhampton Wanderers	1–0	Sheffield United	Wolverhampton
15:00 GMT	Bull 37'			Stadium: Molineux; Attendance: 23,881 (865 away)

4 November 1995 15	Barnsley	1–0	Wolverhampton Wanderers	Barnsley
15:00 GMT	Redfearn 77'			Stadium: Oakwell; Attendance: 9,668 (478 away)

12 November 1995 16	Wolverhampton Wanderers	0–0	Charlton Athletic	Wolverhampton
14:55 GMT				Stadium: Molineux; Attendance: 20,450 (473 away)

18 November 1995 17	Wolverhampton Wanderers	1–3	Oldham Athletic	Wolverhampton
15:00 GMT	Emblen 27'		Makin 62'; McCarthy 64'; Beresford 78'	Stadium: Molineux; Attendance: 23,128 (513 away)

22 November 1995 18	Crystal Palace	3–2	Wolverhampton Wanderers	London
19:45 GMT	Freedman 10', 29', 49'		Thompson 64' (pen.); Young 83'	Stadium: Selhurst Park; Attendance: 12,571 (663 away)

25 November 1995 19	Huddersfield Town	2–1	Wolverhampton Wanderers	Huddersfield
15:00 GMT	Booth 20'; Dalton 38'		Bull 79'	Stadium: McAlpine Stadium; Attendance: 16,423 (1,127 away)

3 December 1995 20	Wolverhampton Wanderers	2–2	Ipswich Town	Wolverhampton
14:55 GMT	Goodman 60', 70'		Marshall 30'; Mowbray 90'	Stadium: Molineux; Attendance: 20,867 (788 away)

10 December 1995 21	Luton Town	2–3	Wolverhampton Wanderers	Luton
14:55 GMT	Oakes 31'; Marshall 50'		Richards 7'; Goodman 18'; Bull 41'	Stadium: Kenilworth Road; Attendance: 6,997 (1,421 away)

16 December 1995 22	Wolverhampton Wanderers	0–1	Port Vale	Wolverhampton
15:00 GMT			Porter 6'	Stadium: Molineux; Attendance: 23,329 (2,424 away)

26 December 1995 23	Wolverhampton Wanderers	1–1	Millwall	Wolverhampton
15:00 GMT	Bull 10'		Malkin 77'	Stadium: Molineux; Attendance: 25,591 (887 away)

30 December 1995 24	Wolverhampton Wanderers	2–2	Portsmouth	Wolverhampton
15:00 GMT	Bull 5'; Goodman 35'		Carter 58'; Burton 65'	Stadium: Molineux; Attendance: 25,294 (1,412 away)

13 January 1996 25	West Bromwich Albion	0–0	Wolverhampton Wanderers	West Bromwich
15:00 GMT				Stadium: The Hawthorns; Attendance: 21,624 (5,000 away)

20 January 1996 26	Wolverhampton Wanderers	2–1	Tranmere Rovers	Wolverhampton
15:00 GMT	Bull 35'; Goodman 67'		Aldridge 55'	Stadium: Molineux; Attendance: 24,173 (984 away)

3 February 1996 27	Wolverhampton Wanderers	3–0	Sunderland	Wolverhampton
15:00 GMT	Thompson 15' (pen.); Goodman 18'; Atkins 61'			Stadium: Molineux; Attendance: 26,537 (2,777 away)

10 February 1996 28	Derby County	0–0	Wolverhampton Wanderers	Derby
15:00 GMT				Stadium: Baseball Ground; Attendance: 17,460 (1,450 away)

17 February 1996 29	Norwich City	2–3	Wolverhampton Wanderers	Norwich
15:00 GMT	Crook 24'; Eadie 25'		Bull 12', 37'; Goodman 74'	Stadium: Carrow Road; Attendance: 14,691 (1,587 away)

21 February 1996 30	Wolverhampton Wanderers	2–3	Leicester City	Wolverhampton
19:45 GMT	Bull 26'; Law 42'		Roberts 38'; Heskey 60', 80'	Stadium: Molineux; Attendance: 27,381 (3,116 away)

24 February 1996 31	Wolverhampton Wanderers	2–0	Southend United	Wolverhampton
15:00 GMT	Young 28'; Thompson 50'			Stadium: Molineux; Attendance: 24,677 (404 away)

2 March 1996 32	Millwall	0–1	Wolverhampton Wanderers	London
15:00 GMT			Bull 69'	Stadium: The New Den; Attendance: 9,131 (1,045 away)

5 March 1996 33	Birmingham City	2–0	Wolverhampton Wanderers	Birmingham
19:45 GMT	Devlin 28' (pen.), 39'			Stadium: St Andrew's; Attendance: 22,051 (2,124 away)

9 March 1996 34	Wolverhampton Wanderers	1–1	Reading	Wolverhampton
15:00 GMT	Atkins 42'		Gooding 17'	Stadium: Molineux; Attendance: 25,954 (1,498 away)

12 March 1996 35	Grimsby Town	3–0	Wolverhampton Wanderers	Cleethorpes
19:45 GMT	Shakespeare 51'; Livingstone 66'; Forrester 78'			Stadium: Blundell Park; Attendance: 5,013 (578 away)

16 March 1996 36	Portsmouth	0–2	Wolverhampton Wanderers	Portsmouth
15:00 GMT			Emblen 39'; Goodman 41'	Stadium: Fratton Park; Attendance: 11,732 (986 away)

23 March 1996 37	Wolverhampton Wanderers	3–2	Birmingham City	Wolverhampton
15:00 GMT	Goodman 37'; Thompson 88' (pen.); Bull 89'		Devlin 6', 84' (pen.)	Stadium: Molineux; Attendance: 26,256 (2,655 away)

30 March 1996 38	Wolverhampton Wanderers	3–0	Watford	Wolverhampton
15:00 GMT	Froggatt 33'; Osborn 41', 54'			Stadium: Molineux; Attendance: 25,885 (812 away)

3 April 1996 39	Stoke City	2–0	Wolverhampton Wanderers	Stoke-on-Trent
19:45 BST	Sheron 3'; Sturridge 59'			Stadium: Victoria Ground; Attendance: 26,483 (2,175 away)

6 April 1996 40	Sheffield United	2–1	Wolverhampton Wanderers	Sheffield
19:45 BST	Taylor 21'; White 31'		Thompson 45' (pen.)	Stadium: Bramall Lane; Attendance: 16,658 (1,484 away)

8 April 1996 41	Wolverhampton Wanderers	2–2	Barnsley	Wolverhampton
15:00 BST	Bull 16'; Ferguson 51' (pen.)		Moses 13'; Payton 85'	Stadium: Molineux; Attendance: 23,789 (706 away)

13 April 1996 42	Oldham Athletic	0–0	Wolverhampton Wanderers	Oldham
15:00 BST				Stadium: Boundary Park; Attendance: 7,592 (1,390 away)

20 April 1996 43	Wolverhampton Wanderers	0–2	Crystal Palace	Wolverhampton
15:00 BST			Hopkin 31'; Dyer 55'	Stadium: Molineux; Attendance: 24,350 (1,500 away)

27 April 1996 44	Wolverhampton Wanderers	0–0	Huddersfield Town	Wolverhampton
15:00 BST				Stadium: Molineux; Attendance: 25,290 (2,589 away)

30 April 1996 45	Reading	3–0	Wolverhampton Wanderers	Reading
19:45 BST	Williams 22'; Quinn 40', 86'			Stadium: Elm Park; Attendance: 12,828 (2,409 away)

5 May 1996 46	Charlton Athletic	1–1	Wolverhampton Wanderers	London
15:00 BST	Leaburn 38'		Crowe 52'	Stadium: The Valley; Attendance: 10,909 (1,723 away)

Final table

Pos	Team	Pld	W	D	L	GF	GA	GD	Pts
17	Grimsby Town	46	14	14	18	55	69	–14	56
18	Oldham Athletic	46	14	14	18	54	50	+4	56
19	Reading	46	13	17	16	54	63	–11	56
20	Wolverhampton Wanderers	46	13	16	17	56	62	–6	55
21	Portsmouth	46	13	13	20	61	69	–8	52
22	Millwall	46	13	13	20	43	63	–20	52

Source: Statto.com

Results summary

Overall								Home						Away					
Pld	W	D	L	GF	GA	GD	Pts	W	D	L	GF	GA	GD	W	D	L	GF	GA	GD
46	13	16	17	56	62	−6	55	8	9	6	34	28	+6	5	7	11	22	34	−12

Source: Statto.com

Results by round

Round	1	2	3	4	5	6	7	8	9	10	11	12	13	14	15	16	17	18	19	20	21	22	23	24	25	26	27	28	29	30	31	32	33	34	35	36	37	38	39	40	41	42	43	44	45	46
Result	D	D	L	W	L	W	L	L	D	D	W	L	D	W	L	D	L	L	L	D	W	L	D	D	D	W	W	D	W	L	W	W	L	D	L	W	W	W	L	L	D	D	L	D	L	D
Position	9	19	21	12	15	12	16	18	18	19	15	18	16	16	18	18	18	19	20	21	20	22	22	20	20	20	18	18	17	18	16	14	15	15	15	14	12	11	12	13	15	15	18	18	18	20

Source: Statto.com
W = Win; D = Draw; L = Loss

=== FA Cup ===
6 January 1996 R3	Birmingham City	1–1	Wolverhampton Wanderers	Birmingham
15:00 GMT	Poole 72'		Bull 25'	Stadium: St Andrew's; Attendance: 21,349; Referee: Robbie Hart

17 January 1996 R3 rep.	Wolverhampton Wanderers	2–1	Birmingham City	Wolverhampton
19:45 GMT	Ferguson 17'; Bull 62'		Hunt 51'	Stadium: Molineux; Attendance: 28,088; Referee: Robbie Hart

27 January 1996 R4	Tottenham Hotspur	1–1	Wolverhampton Wanderers	London
15:00 GMT	Wilson 13'		Goodman 28'	Stadium: White Hart Lane; Attendance: 32,812; Referee: David Allison

7 February 1996 R4 rep.	Wolverhampton Wanderers	0–2	Tottenham Hotspur	Wolverhampton
19:45 GMT			Rosenthal 7'; Sheringham 9'	Stadium: Molineux; Attendance: 27,846; Referee: David Allison

=== League Cup ===
20 September 1995 R2.1	Wolverhampton Wanderers	2–0	Fulham	Wolverhampton
19:45 BST	Goodman 4'; Wright 50'			Stadium: Molineux; Attendance: 20,381

3 October 1995 R2.2	Fulham	1–5 (1–7 agg.)	Wolverhampton Wanderers	London
19:45 BST	Cusack 82'		Daley 28'; Williams 69'; Atkins 77'; Goodman 86', 88'	Stadium: Craven Cottage; Attendance: 6,625

25 October 1995 R3	Wolverhampton Wanderers	0–0	Charlton Athletic	Wolverhampton
19:45 GMT				Stadium: Molineux; Attendance: 22,481

8 November 1995 R3 rep.	Charlton Athletic	1–2 (a.e.t.)	Wolverhampton Wanderers	London
19:45 GMT	Robinson 54'		Emblen 23'; Atkins 98'	Stadium: The Valley; Attendance: 10,909

29 November 1995 R4	Wolverhampton Wanderers	2–1	Coventry City	Wolverhampton
19:45 GMT	Venus 33'; Ferguson 34'		Williams 67'	Stadium: Molineux; Attendance: 24,628

10 January 1996 QF	Aston Villa	1–0	Wolverhampton Wanderers	Birmingham
19:45 GMT	Johnson 66'			Stadium: Villa Park; Attendance: 39,277

== Players ==
Key:
‡ On loan from another club * First appearance(s) for the club

- # = Squad number
- Pos = Playing position
- P = Number of games played 10
- G = Number of goals scored
- GK = Goalkeeper
- DF = Defender
- MF = Midfielder
- FW = Forward
- = Yellow cards
- = Red cards
- † Permanent player left club during the season
- ¤ Loaned to another club for part or all of season

Correct as of end of season. Starting appearances are listed first, followed by substitute appearances in parentheses where applicable.

Pos	Name	P	G	P	G	P	G	P	G	A yellow card	A red card	Notes
Pos	Name	League		FA Cup		League Cup		Total		Discipline		Notes
GK	(England) Andy De Bont	0	0	0	0	0	0	0	0	0	0	
GK	(Wales) Paul Jones	8	0	0	0	2	0	10	0	0	0	
GK	(England) Mike Stowell	38	0	4	0	4	0	46	0	0	0	
DF	(Netherlands) John de Wolf	14(1)	1	0	0	1	0	15(1)	1	0	0	
DF	(Wales) Brian Law	5(2)	1	1	0	1(1)	0	7(3)	1	0	1	
DF	(Northern Ireland) Neil Masters	3	0	0	0	0	0	3	0	0	0	
DF	(England) Dennis Pearce	3(2)	0	1	0	1	0	5(2)	0	0	0	
DF	(England) Dean Richards	36(1)	1	2	0	5	0	43(1)	1	0	0	
DF	(England) Peter Shirtliff †	2	0	0	0	0	0	2	0	0	0	
DF	(England) Jamie Smith	10(3)	0	0	0	1	0	11(3)	0	0	0	
DF	(England) Andy Thompson	45	6	4	0	6	0	55	6	0	0	
DF	(England) Mark Venus	19(3)	0	2	0	3	1	24(3)	1	0	0	
DF	(Wales) Eric Young	30	2	4	0	5	0	39	2	0	0	
MF	(England) Mark Atkins	26(6)	3	4	0	5	2	35(6)	5	0	0	
MF	(England) Paul Birch ¤	5(2)	0	0	0	2(1)	0	7(3)	0	0	0	
MF	(Australia) Steve Corica	17	0	0	0	0	0	17	0	0	0	
MF	(England) Gordon Cowans †	10(6)	0	0	0	2	0	12(6)	0	0	0	
MF	(England) Tony Daley	16(2)	3	0(1)	0	4	1	20(3)	4	0	0	
MF	(Northern Ireland) Robbie Dennison ¤	0	0	0	0	0(1)	0	0(1)	0	0	0	
MF	(England) Neil Emblen	30(3)	2	3	0	1(1)	1	34(4)	3	0	0	
MF	(Scotland) Darren Ferguson	26(7)	1	3(1)	1	4	1	33(8)	3	0	0	
MF	(England) Richard Flash	0	0	0	0	0	0	0	0	0	0	
MF	(England) Steve Froggatt	13(5)	1	0	0	0	0	13(5)	1	0	0	
MF	(England) Simon Osborn	21	2	4	0	0	0	25	2	0	0	
MF	(England) Mark Rankine	27(5)	0	3(1)	0	6	0	36(6)	0	0	1	
MF	(Wales) Carl Robinson ¤	0	0	0	0	0	0	0	0	0	0	
MF	(England) Vinny Samways ‡	3	0	0	0	0	0	3	0	0	0	
MF	(England) Geoff Thomas	0(2)	0	0	0	0	0	0(2)	0	0	1	
MF	(England) Jermaine Wright	4(3)	0	0	0	1(1)	1	5(4)	1	0	0	
FW	(England) Steve Bull	42(2)	15	4	2	4(1)	0	50(3)	17	0	1	
FW	(Republic of Ireland) Glen Crowe	1(1)	1	0	0	0	0	1(1)	1	0	0	
FW	(Republic of Ireland) Dominic Foley	1(4)	0	0(1)	0	0(1)	0	1(6)	0	0	0	
FW	(England) Don Goodman	43(1)	16	4	1	6	3	53(1)	20	0	0	
FW	(Republic of Ireland) David Kelly †	3(2)	0	0	0	0	0	3(2)	0	0	0	
FW	(South Africa) Mark Williams	5(7)	0	1	0	2(1)	1	8(8)	1	0	0	

Source: Wolverhampton Wanderers: The Complete Record

== Transfers ==
=== In ===
Date	Player	From	Fee
30 May 1995	(England) Dean Richards	Bradford City	£1.85 million
13 September 1995	(Wales) Eric Young	Crystal Palace	Free
20 September 1995	(South Africa) Mark Williams	(Belgium) RWD Molenbeek	£300,000
21 September 1995	(England) Mark Atkins	Blackburn Rovers	£1 million
22 September 1995	(England) Richard Flash	Manchester United	Free
22 December 1995	(England) Simon Osborn	Queens Park Rangers	£1 million
16 February 1996	(Australia) Steve Corica	Leicester City	£1.1 million
16 February 1996	(Australia) Željko Kalac	Leicester City	£650,000

=== Out ===
Date	Player	To	Fee
23 June 1995	(Scotland) Tom Bennett	Stockport County	£75,000
18 July 1995	(England) Paul Blades	Rotherham United	£110,000
25 August 1995	(England) Peter Shirtliff	Barnsley	£125,000
18 September 1995	(Republic of Ireland) David Kelly	Sunderland	£1 million
29 December 1995	(England) Gordon Cowans	Sheffield United	Free

=== Loans in ===
Start date	Player	From	End date
21 December 1995	(England) Vinny Samways	Everton	21 January 1996

=== Loans out ===
Start date	Player	To	End date
5 October 1995	(Northern Ireland) Robbie Dennison	(Wales) Swansea City	End of season
7 March 1996	(England) Paul Birch	Preston North End	End of season
28 March 1996	(Wales) Carl Robinson	Shrewsbury Town	End of season

== Management and coaching staff ==
Position	Name
Manager	Graham Taylor (until 13 November), then Mark McGhee (from 13 December onward)
Assistant manager	Bobby Downes, then Colin Lee (from 13 December onward)
First Team coach	Mike Hickman
Youth Development Officer	Chris Evans
Youth Team coach	Chris Turner
Club doctors	Dr Peter Ackroyd and Dr Peter Bekenn
Club Physio	Barry Holmes

== Kit ==
The season saw a new home shirt introduced featuring an embroidered crest and new collar design. The all-white away kit of the previous season was retained. Both were manufactured by Nutmeg Clothing and featured sponsor name of Goodyear.
