= 1989–90 Crystal Palace F.C. season =

English football club season

Crystal Palace F.C.
1989–90 season
- Chairman: Ron Noades
- Manager: Steve Coppell
- Ground: Selhurst Park
- First Division: 15th
- FA Cup: Runners-up (eliminated by Manchester United)
- League Cup: Third round (eliminated by Nottingham Forest)
- Full Members' Cup: Southern final (eliminated by Chelsea)
- Top goalscorer: League: Mark Bright (12); All: Mark Bright (17)
- Highest home attendance: 29,870 vs Liverpool; First Division, 20 January 1990
- Lowest home attendance: 3,747 vs Luton Town, Full Members' Cup, 27 November 1989
- Average home league attendance: 17,369
- Biggest win: 4–0 vs Huddersfield Town (home), FA Cup, 27 January 1990
- Biggest defeat: 9–0 vs Liverpool (away), First Division, 12 September 1989
Home colours	Away colours	Third colours

The 1989–90 season was the 74th season of competitive association football and 63rd season in the Football League played by Crystal Palace Football Club, a professional football club based in Selhurst, South London, England. Their promotion via the Second Division play-offs in 1988–89 meant they played in the First Division, after an eight-year absence from the top division of the English football league system. The season ran from 1 July 1989 to 30 June 1990.

It was Steve Coppell's sixth start to a season as manager. Palace occupied a position in the bottom half of the table for most of the season, and finished the 1989–90 Football League First Division in 15th place. The club suffered its record league defeat this season when Liverpool beat them 9–0 at Anfield. Palace reached the 1990 FA Cup final at Wembley Stadium, they drew 3–3 with Manchester United and so the tie had to be replayed five days later, United won 1–0 to give Alex Ferguson his first major trophy as their manager. Palace were eliminated from the 1989–90 Football League Cup in the third round, and from the 1989–90 Full Members' Cup in the Southern section final.

23 players made at least one appearance in nationally organised first-team competition, and there were 12 different goalscorers. Midfielders Andy Gray, Alan Pardew and Geoff Thomas played in 51 of the 54 competitive matches played over the season; Gray started all 51 while Pardew and Thomas made 2 and 4 substitute appearances respectively. Mark Bright finished as leading scorer with 17 goals, of which 12 came in league competition, two came in the FA Cup, one came in the League Cup and two came in the Full Members' Cup. Bright was voted as the Crystal Palace F.C. Player of the Year.

== Background and pre-season ==
The 1988–89 season was Palace's eight successive season in the Football League Second Division. They finished the season in third place missing out on the second automatic promotion place by one point, instead they qualified for the play-offs. They beat Swindon Town in the semi-final 2–1 on aggregate. In the 1989 Football League Second Division play-off final they faced Blackburn Rovers, the first leg was won by Rovers 3–1 at Ewood Park. In the second leg at Selhurst Park, Palace were 2–0 up after 90 minutes so the match went into extra time. Another goal from Palace saw them win the tie and take the remaining place in the First Division.

Pre-season match details
Date	Opponents	Venue	Result	Score F–A
23 July 1989	IF Norvalla	A	W	3–1
25 July 1989	Billesholms GIF	A	W	7–2
27 July 1989	Verderslov Danninglanda	A	W	5–1
29 July 1989	Virserums SGF	A	W	7–1
31 July 1989	Skera IF	A	W	7–1
1 August 1989	Sodra Vings IF	A	W	2–0
5 August 1989	Farnborough Town	A	W	2–1
8 August 1989	Aldershot	A	W	2–0
11 August 1989	Swansea City	A	W	4–1
13 August 1989	West Ham United	A	L	1–3
30 August 1989	Derry City	A	W	4–2

== League table ==
Pos	Team	Pld	W	D	L	GF	GA	GD	Pts	Qualification or relegation
13	Manchester United	38	13	9	16	46	47	−1	48	Qualification for the European Cup Winners' Cup first round (Note: Manchester United qualified for the UEFA Cup Winners' Cup as the 1989–90 FA Cup winners.)
14	Manchester City	38	12	12	14	43	52	−9	48	
15	Crystal Palace	38	13	9	16	42	66	−24	48	
16	Derby County	38	13	7	18	43	40	+3	46	
17	Luton Town	38	10	13	15	43	57	−14	43	

Source: World Football
Rules for classification: 1) Points; 2) Goal difference; 3) Goals scored

== Results ==
=== First Division ===
19 August 1989 1	Queens Park Rangers	2–0	Crystal Palace	London
	Wright x2			Stadium: Loftus Road; Attendance: 16,161

22 August 1989 2	Crystal Palace	1–1	Manchester United	London
	Wright		Robson	Stadium: Selhurst Park; Attendance: 22,423

26 August 1989 3	Crystal Palace	0–1	Coventry City	London
			Kilcline	Stadium: Selhurst Park; Attendance: 11,122

9 September 1989 4	Crystal Palace	2–0	Wimbledon	London
	Thomas; Wright			Stadium: Selhurst Park; Attendance: 12,116

12 September 1989 5	Liverpool	9–0	Crystal Palace	Liverpool
	Nicol 7', 90'; McMahon 15'; Rush 45'; Gillespie 56'; Beardsley 61'; Aldridge 67' (pen.); Barnes 79'; Hysén 82'			Stadium: Anfield; Attendance: 35,779

16 September 1989 6	Southampton	1–1	Crystal Palace	Southampton
	Horne		Hopkins	Stadium: The Dell; Attendance: 15,368

23 September 1989 7	Crystal Palace	1–0	Nottingham Forest	London
	Wright			Stadium: Selhurst Park; Attendance: 12,899

30 September 1989 8	Crystal Palace	2–1	Everton	London
	Wright; Pardew		Newell	Stadium: Selhurst Park; Attendance: 15,943

14 October 1989 9	Derby County	3–1	Crystal Palace	Derby
	Goddard x2 Saunders (pen.)		Pardew	Stadium: Baseball Ground; Attendance: 14,535

21 October 1989 10	Crystal Palace	4–3	Millwall	London
	Wright x2 Bright x2		Hopkins (o.g.); Cascarino; Anthrobus	Stadium: Selhurst Park; Attendance: 18,920

28 October 1989 11	Aston Villa	2–1	Crystal Palace	Birmingham
	Platt x2		Pardew	Stadium: Villa Park; Attendance: 15,724

4 November 1989 12	Manchester City	3–0	Crystal Palace	Manchester
	White; Morley; Allen			Stadium: Maine Road; Attendance: 23,768

11 November 1989 13	Crystal Palace	1–1	Luton Town	London
	Bright		Wilson	Stadium: Selhurst Park; Attendance: 11,346

18 November 1989 14	Crystal Palace	2–3	Tottenham Hotspur	London
	Bright x2		Howells; Samways; Lineker (pen.)	Stadium: Selhurst Park; Attendance: 26,266

25 November 1989 15	Sheffield Wednesday	2–2	Crystal Palace	Sheffield
	Whitton; Hirst		Gray; Hopkins	Stadium: Hillsborough; Attendance: 17,227

2 December 1989 16	Crystal Palace	0–3	Queens Park Rangers	London
			Maddix; Sinton x2	Stadium: Selhurst Park; Attendance: 12,784

9 December 1989 17	Manchester United	1–2	Crystal Palace	Manchester
	Beardsmore		Bright x2	Stadium: Old Trafford; Attendance: 33,514

16 December 1989 18	Charlton Athletic	1–2	Crystal Palace	London
	Walsh		Thorn; Bright	Stadium: Selhurst Park; Attendance: 15,763

26 December 1989 19	Crystal Palace	2–2	Chelsea	London
	Wright; Pemberton		Dixon; Le Saux	Stadium: Selhurst Park; Attendance: 24,680

30 December 1989 20	Crystal Palace	1–0	Norwich City	London
	Wright			Stadium: Selhurst Park; Attendance: 14,250

1 January 1990 21	Arsenal	4–1	Crystal Palace	London
	Dixon; Adams; Smith x2		Pardew	Stadium: Highbury; Attendance: 38,711

13 January 1990 22	Coventry City	1–0	Crystal Palace	Coventry
	Speedie			Stadium: Highfield Road; Attendance: 10,858

20 January 1990 23	Crystal Palace	0–2	Liverpool	London
			Rush 9'; Beardsley 62'	Stadium: Selhurst Park; Attendance: 29,807

3 February 1990 24	Nottingham Forest	3–1	Crystal Palace	Nottingham
	Clough; Hodge; Jemson		Salako	Stadium: City Ground; Attendance: 19,739

10 February 1990 25	Crystal Palace	3–1	Southampton	London
	Salako; Gray; Barber		Osman	Stadium: Selhurst Park; Attendance: 13,363

24 February 1990 26	Crystal Palace	1–1	Sheffield Wednesday	London
	Bright		Worthington	Stadium: Selhurst Park; Attendance: 11,857

3 March 1990 27	Tottenham Hotspur	0–1	Crystal Palace	London
			Pardew	Stadium: White Hart Lane; Attendance: 26,181

17 March 1990 28	Everton	4–0	Crystal Palace	Everton
	Cottee x2 Whiteside; Sharp			Stadium: Goodison Park; Attendance: 19,274

20 March 1990 29	Crystal Palace	1–1	Derby County	London
	Gray		Wright	Stadium: Selhurst Park; Attendance: 10,051

24 March 1990 30	Crystal Palace	1–0	Aston Villa	London
	Thompson			Stadium: Selhurst Park; Attendance: 18,586

31 March 1990 31	Millwall	1–2	Crystal Palace	London
	Allen		Bright; Gray	Stadium: The Den; Attendance: 13,332

4 April 1990 32	Norwich City	2–0	Crystal Palace	Norwich
	Sherwood; O'Reilly (o.g.)			Stadium: Carrow Road; Attendance: 12,640

14 April 1990 33	Crystal Palace	1–1	Arsenal	London
	Gray		Hayes	Stadium: Selhurst Park; Attendance: 28,094

16 April 1990 34	Chelsea	3–0	Crystal Palace	London
	Dixon; Stuart; Wilson			Stadium: Stamford Bridge; Attendance: 16,132

21 April 1990 35	Crystal Palace	2–0	Charlton Athletic	London
	Thompson; Bright			Stadium: Selhurst Park; Attendance: 15,276

28 April 1990 36	Luton Town	1–0	Crystal Palace	Luton
	Dowie			Stadium: Kenilworth Road; Attendance: 10,369

2 May 1990 37	Wimbledon	0–1	Crystal Palace	London
			Bright	Stadium: Plough Lane; Attendance: 8,209

5 May 1990 38	Crystal Palace	2–2	Manchester City	London
	Pardew; Gray		Allen (pen.); Quinn	Stadium: Selhurst Park; Attendance: 20,056

=== FA Cup ===
6 January 1990 Round 3	Crystal Palace	2–1	Portsmouth	London
				Stadium: Selhurst Park

27 January 1990 Round 4	Crystal Palace	4–0	Huddersfield Town	London
				Stadium: Selhurst Park

17 February 1990 Round 5	Crystal Palace	1–0	Rochdale	London
				Stadium: Selhurst Park

10 March 1990 Quarter-final	Cambridge United	0–1	Crystal Palace	Cambridge
				Stadium: Abbey Stadium

8 April 1990 Semi-final	Crystal Palace	4–3 (a.e.t.)	Liverpool	Birmingham
	Bright 46'; O'Reilly 70'; Gray 88'; Pardew 109'		Rush 14'; McMahon 81'; Barnes 83' (pen.)	Stadium: Villa Park; Attendance: 38,389

12 May 1990 Final	Manchester United	3–3 (a.e.t.)	Crystal Palace	London
	Robson 35'; Hughes 62', 113'		O'Reilly 18'; Wright 72', 92'	Stadium: Wembley; Attendance: 80,000

17 May 1990 Final replay	Manchester United	1–0	Crystal Palace	London
	Martin 59'			Stadium: Wembley; Attendance: 80,000

=== League Cup ===
19 September 1989 Round 2 leg 1	Crystal Palace	1–2	Leicester City	London
				Stadium: Selhurst Park; Attendance: 7,382

4 October 1989 Round 2 leg 2	Leicester City	2–3 (a.e.t.) (4–4 agg.)	Crystal Palace	Leicester
				Stadium: Filbert Street; Attendance: 10,283
Note: (Crystal Palace won on away goals)

24 October 1989 Round 3	Crystal Palace	0–0	Nottingham Forest	London
				Stadium: Selhurst Park; Attendance: 14,250

1 November 1989 Round 3 replay	Nottingham Forest	5–0	Crystal Palace	Nottingham
				Stadium: City Ground; Attendance: 18,625

=== Full Members' Cup ===
29 November 1989 Southern section round 2	Crystal Palace	4–1	Luton Town	London
				Stadium: Selhurst Park; Attendance: 3,747

19 December 1989 Southern section round 3	Crystal Palace	2–0	Charlton Athletic	London
				Stadium: Selhurst Park; Attendance: 6,621

13 February 1990 Southern section semi-final	Crystal Palace	1–0	Swindon Town	London
				Stadium: Selhurst Park; Attendance: 6,027

21 February 1990 Southern section final leg 1	Crystal Palace	0–2	Chelsea	London
				Stadium: Selhurst Park; Attendance: 14,839

12 March 1990 Southern section final leg 1	Chelsea	2–0 (4–0 agg.)	Crystal Palace	London
				Stadium: Stamford Bridge; Attendance: 15,061

== Squad ==
Note: Flags indicate national team as defined under FIFA eligibility rules; some limited exceptions apply. Players may hold more than one non-FIFA nationality.

Pos.	Nation	Player
GK	ENG	Nigel Martyn
GK	ENG	Perry Suckling
GK	ENG	Brian Parkin
GK	ENG	Andy Woodman
DF	WAL	Jeff Hopkins
DF	ENG	John Pemberton
DF	ENG	Rudi Hedman
DF	ENG	Adam Locke
DF	ENG	Gareth Southgate
DF	ENG	Gary O'Reilly
DF	ENG	Richard Shaw
DF	ENG	Andy Thorn
DF	ENG	Mark Dennis
DF	ENG	Chris Powell
DF	ENG	Ricky Newman

Pos.	Nation	Player
DF	ENG	Alex Dyer
DF	ENG	David Burke
MF	ENG	Phil Barber
MF	ENG	Andy Gray
MF	ENG	David Madden
MF	IRL	Eddie McGoldrick
MF	ENG	Alan Pardew
MF	ENG	John Salako
MF	ENG	Geoff Thomas
MF	ENG	Mark Hone
MF	ENG	Simon Osborn
FW	ENG	Mark Bright
FW	ENG	Ian Wright
FW	ENG	Garry Thompson
FW	ENG	David Whyte
