= 1996–97 Wolverhampton Wanderers F.C. season =

English football club season

Wolverhampton Wanderers
1996–97 season
- Chairman: Jonathan Hayward
- Manager: Mark McGhee
- First Division: 3rd (lost in play-offs)
- FA Cup: 3rd round
- League Cup: 1st round
- Top goalscorer: League: Steve Bull (23); All: Steve Bull (23)
- Highest home attendance: 27,400 (vs Stoke, 1 February 1997)
- Lowest home attendance: 10,760 (vs Swindon, 4 September 1996)
- Average home league attendance: 24,763 (league only)

The 1996–97 season was the 98th season of competitive league football in the history of English football club Wolverhampton Wanderers. They played the season in the second tier of the English football system, the Football League First Division.

The team finished in third position in the league, their highest position in the football pyramid since their relegation from the top flight in 1983–84. Nonetheless, the season ended in disappointment for the club as they lost in the semi-finals of the play-offs to Crystal Palace, thereby failing to reach the Premier League.

Their failure to finish ahead of unfancied Barnsley in the automatic promotion places, and then subsequent play-off exit, caused owner Sir Jack Hayward to make an emotional outburst days after the campaign in which he accused manager Mark McGhee and the chairman, his son Jonathan, of "blackmailing" him into funding their high transfer spending. He promised that there would be an end to Wolves being a "sloppily-run club".

== Results ==
=== Football League First Division ===
A total of 24 teams competed in the Football League First Division in the 1996–97 season. Each team played every other team twice: once at their stadium, and once at the opposition's. Three points were awarded to teams for each win, one point per draw, and none for defeats. Teams finishing level on points were firstly divided by the number of goals scored rather than goal difference.

The provisional fixture list was released on 17 June 1996, but was subject to change in the event of matches being selected for television coverage or police concerns.

17 August 1996 1	Grimsby Town	1–3	Wolverhampton Wanderers	Cleethorpes
15:00 BST	Mendonca 62'	Report	Bull 36', 45', 71'	Stadium: Blundell Park; Attendance: 7,910 (1,800 away)

24 August 1996 2	Wolverhampton Wanderers	1–0	Bradford City	Wolverhampton
15:00 BST	Bull 72'	Report		Stadium: Molineux; Attendance: 24,171 (2,053 away)

28 August 1996 3	Wolverhampton Wanderers	1–1	Queens Park Rangers	Wolverhampton
19:45 BST	Osborn 24'	Report	Dichio 41'	Stadium: Molineux; Attendance: 25,767 (1,587 away)

31 August 1996 4	Norwich City	1–0	Wolverhampton Wanderers	Norwich
15:00 BST	Adams 21' (pen.)	Report		Stadium: Carrow Road; Attendance: 14,456 (991 away)

6 September 1996 5	Wolverhampton Wanderers	1–0	Charlton Athletic	Wolverhampton
19:45 BST	Thompson 39' (pen.)	Report		Stadium: Molineux; Attendance: 21,072 (643 away)

10 September 1996 6	Oxford United	1–1	Wolverhampton Wanderers	Oxford
19:45 BST	Ford 39'	Report	Roberts 54'	Stadium: Manor Ground; Attendance: 7,468 (1,900 away)

15 September 1996 7	West Bromwich Albion	2–4	Wolverhampton Wanderers	West Bromwich
13:00 BST	Hamilton 42'; Taylor 66'	Report	Roberts 4', 27', 53'; Bull 14'	Stadium: The Hawthorns; Attendance: 20,711 (5,000 away)

21 September 1996 8	Wolverhampton Wanderers	1–2	Sheffield United	Wolverhampton
15:00 BST	Thompson 89' (pen.)	Report	White 76'; Kachura 90'	Stadium: Molineux; Attendance: 25,170 (1,498 away)

27 September 1996 9	Swindon Town	1–2	Wolverhampton Wanderers	Swindon
19:45 BST	Horlock 67'	Report	Ferguson 44'; Foley 85'	Stadium: County Ground; Attendance: 8,572 (2,006 away)

2 October 1996 10	Wolverhampton Wanderers	1–2	Bolton Wanderers	Wolverhampton
19:45 BST	Ferguson 12'	Report	McGinlay 39', 86'	Stadium: Molineux; Attendance: 26,540 (2,373 away)

5 October 1996 11	Wolverhampton Wanderers	0–1	Reading	Wolverhampton
15:00 BST		Report	Lambert 69'	Stadium: Molineux; Attendance: 23,193 (1,022 away)

13 October 1996 12	Southend United	1–1	Wolverhampton Wanderers	Southend-on-Sea
13:00 BST	Marsh 38'	Report	Bull 73'	Stadium: Roots Hall; Attendance: 5,550 (846 away)

15 October 1996 13	Portsmouth	0–2	Wolverhampton Wanderers	Portsmouth
19:45 BST		Report	Bull 12', 68'	Stadium: Fratton Park; Attendance: 7,411 (1,359 away)

19 October 1996 14	Wolverhampton Wanderers	0–1	Port Vale	Wolverhampton
15:00 BST		Report	Naylor 65'	Stadium: Molineux; Attendance: 22,755 (813 away)

27 October 1996 15	Manchester City	0–1	Wolverhampton Wanderers	Manchester
13:00 GMT		Report	Bull 77'	Stadium: Maine Road; Attendance: 27,296 (1,589 away)

30 October 1996 16	Wolverhampton Wanderers	0–0	Huddersfield Town	Wolverhampton
19:45 GMT		Report		Stadium: Molineux; Attendance: 22,376 (1,169 away)

2 November 1996 17	Wolverhampton Wanderers	3–3	Barnsley	Wolverhampton
15:00 GMT	Goodman 28'; Bull 61'; Roberts 86'	Report	de Zeeuw 31'; Redfearn 35' (pen.); Eaden 44'	Stadium: Molineux; Attendance: 22,840 (1,288 away)

17 November 1996 18	Wolverhampton Wanderers	1–2	Birmingham City	Wolverhampton
14:10 GMT	Bull 10'	Report	Breen 8'; Legg 58'	Stadium: Molineux; Attendance: 22,627 (2,544 away)

23 November 1996 19	Crystal Palace	2–3	Wolverhampton Wanderers	London
15:00 GMT	Veart 51'; Dyer 55'	Report	Corica 9', 14'; Thomas 61'	Stadium: Selhurst Park; Attendance: 20,655 (1,610 away)

1 December 1996 20	Wolverhampton Wanderers	3–0	Manchester City	Wolverhampton
14:10 GMT	Roberts 46', 54'; Dennison 80'	Report		Stadium: Molineux; Attendance: 23,911 (2,999 away)

7 December 1996 21	Ipswich Town	0–0	Wolverhampton Wanderers	Ipswich
15:00 GMT		Report		Stadium: Portman Road; Attendance: 12,048 (855 away)

14 December 1996 22	Wolverhampton Wanderers	0–1	Oldham Athletic	Wolverhampton
15:00 GMT		Report	Ormondroyd 15'	Stadium: Molineux; Attendance: 22,528 (883 away)

21 December 1996 23	Tranmere Rovers	0–2	Wolverhampton Wanderers	Birkenhead
15:00 GMT		Report	Osborn 5' (pen.); Bull 76'	Stadium: Prenton Park; Attendance: 9,674 (2,013 away)

26 December 1996 24	Wolverhampton Wanderers	3–1	Oxford United	Wolverhampton
15:00 GMT	Osborn 13', 67'; Goodman 63'	Report	Gray 33'	Stadium: Molineux; Attendance: 26,511 (1,365 away)

28 December 1996 25	Charlton Athletic	0–0	Wolverhampton Wanderers	London
15:00 GMT		Report		Stadium: The Valley; Attendance: 12,259 (1,977 away)

12 January 1997 26	Wolverhampton Wanderers	2–0	West Bromwich Albion	Wolverhampton
14:10 GMT	Richards 3'; Roberts 37'	Report		Stadium: Molineux; Attendance: 27,336 (3,153 away)

18 January 1997 27	Bolton Wanderers	3–0	Wolverhampton Wanderers	Bolton
15:00 GMT	McGinlay 21'; Curle 58' (o.g.); Blake 62'	Report		Stadium: Burnden Park; Attendance: 18,980 (2,500 away)

24 January 1997 28	Sheffield United	2–3	Wolverhampton Wanderers	Sheffield
19:45 GMT	White 24', 82'	Report	Atkins 19'; Osborn 25'; Bull 88'	Stadium: Bramall Lane; Attendance: 17,490 (1,655 away)

29 January 1997 29	Wolverhampton Wanderers	1–0	Swindon Town	Wolverhampton
19:45 GMT	Bull 35'	Report		Stadium: Molineux; Attendance: 23,003 (693 away)

1 February 1997 30	Wolverhampton Wanderers	2–0	Stoke City	Wolverhampton
15:00 GMT	Bull 16', 55'	Report		Stadium: Molineux; Attendance: 27,400 (2,777 away)

8 February 1997 31	Huddersfield Town	0–2	Wolverhampton Wanderers	Huddersfield
15:00 GMT		Report	Froggatt 37'; Bull 84'	Stadium: McAlpine Stadium; Attendance: 15,267 (1,704 away)

15 February 1997 32	Wolverhampton Wanderers	0–3	Crystal Palace	Wolverhampton
15:00 GMT		Report	Tuttle 17'; Veart 72'; Dyer 73'	Stadium: Molineux; Attendance: 25,919 (1,617 away)

22 February 1997 33	Barnsley	1–3	Wolverhampton Wanderers	Barnsley
15:00 GMT	Sheridan 53'	Report	Bull 2'; Roberts 23'; Froggatt 59'	Stadium: Oakwell; Attendance: 18,024 (5,800 away)

1 March 1997 34	Wolverhampton Wanderers	0–0	Ipswich Town	Wolverhampton
15:00 GMT		Report		Stadium: Molineux; Attendance: 26,700 (1,284 away)

4 March 1997 35	Birmingham City	1–2	Wolverhampton Wanderers	Birmingham
19:45 GMT	Forster 70'	Report	Bull 1'; Roberts 23'	Stadium: St Andrew's; Attendance: 19,838 (2,800 away)

8 March 1997 36	Wolverhampton Wanderers	3–2	Tranmere Rovers	Wolverhampton
15:00 GMT	Bull 34', 41'; Roberts 79'	Report	Irons 55'; Aldridge 57'	Stadium: Molineux; Attendance: 26,192 (1,073 away)

15 March 1997 37	Oldham Athletic	3–2	Wolverhampton Wanderers	Oldham
15:00 GMT	Rickers 3', 87'; Barlow 55'	Report	Bull 24'; Roberts 76'	Stadium: Boundary Park; Attendance: 9,661 (3,706 away)

18 March 1997 38	Stoke City	1–0	Wolverhampton Wanderers	Stoke-on-Trent
19:45 GMT	Forsyth 47'	Report		Stadium: Victoria Ground; Attendance: 15,683 (2,163 away)

22 March 1997 39	Bradford City	2–1	Wolverhampton Wanderers	Bradford
15:00 GMT	Edinho 45'; Pepper 51'	Report	Goodman 55'	Stadium: Valley Parade; Attendance: 15,351 (2,565 away)

31 March 1997 40	Queens Park Rangers	2–2	Wolverhampton Wanderers	London
15:00 BST	Spencer 13'; Peacock 27'	Report	Goodman 39'; Curle 70' (pen.)	Stadium: Loftus Road; Attendance: 17,376 (3,200 away)

5 April 1997 41	Wolverhampton Wanderers	3–2	Norwich City	Wolverhampton
15:00 BST	Thomas 19'; Curle 35' (pen.); Roberts 78'	Report	Broughton 43'; Adams 45' (pen.)	Stadium: Molineux; Attendance: 26,938 (1,324 away)

12 April 1997 42	Reading	2–1	Wolverhampton Wanderers	Reading
15:00 BST	Lovell 89', 90'	Report	Atkins 75'	Stadium: Elm Park; Attendance: 14,852 (2,450 away)

19 April 1997 43	Wolverhampton Wanderers	4–1	Southend United	Wolverhampton
15:00 BST	Ferguson 7'; Bull 9'; Atkins 35'; Goodman 40'	Report	Rammell 30'	Stadium: Molineux; Attendance: 25,095 (585 away)

23 April 1997 44	Wolverhampton Wanderers	1–1	Grimsby Town	Wolverhampton
19:45 BST	Gilkes 10'	Report	Oster 45'	Stadium: Molineux; Attendance: 25,474 (462 away)

27 April 1997 45	Port Vale	1–2	Wolverhampton Wanderers	Burslem
13:00 BST	Naylor 40'	Report	Thomas 34'; Atkins 42'	Stadium: Vale Park; Attendance: 13,615 (3,587 away)

4 May 1997 46	Wolverhampton Wanderers	0–1	Portsmouth	Wolverhampton
13:30 BST		Report	Hall 80'	Stadium: Molineux; Attendance: 26,031 (1,487 away)

Final table

Pos	Team	Pld	W	D	L	GF	GA	GD	Pts
1	Bolton Wanderers	46	28	14	4	100	53	+47	98
2	Barnsley	46	22	14	10	76	55	+21	80
3	Wolverhampton Wanderers	46	22	10	14	68	51	+17	76
4	Ipswich Town	46	20	14	12	68	50	+18	74
5	Sheffield United	46	20	13	13	75	52	+23	73
6	Crystal Palace	46	19	14	13	78	48	+30	71

Source: Statto.com

Results summary

Overall								Home						Away					
Pld	W	D	L	GF	GA	GD	Pts	W	D	L	GF	GA	GD	W	D	L	GF	GA	GD
46	22	10	14	68	51	+17	76	10	5	8	31	24	+7	12	5	6	37	27	+10

Source: Statto.com

Results by round

Round	1	2	3	4	5	6	7	8	9	10	11	12	13	14	15	16	17	18	19	20	21	22	23	24	25	26	27	28	29	30	31	32	33	34	35	36	37	38	39	40	41	42	43	44	45	46
Result	W	W	D	L	W	D	W	L	W	L	L	D	W	L	W	D	D	L	W	W	D	L	W	W	D	W	L	W	W	W	W	L	W	D	W	W	L	L	L	D	W	L	W	D	W	L
Position	1	2	4	6	3	6	3	4	3	5	6	6	3	5	4	6	5	9	7	6	5	6	5	5	4	4	4	4	4	2	2	3	2	2	2	2	2	2	2	3	3	3	3	3	3	3

Source: Statto.com
W = Win; D = Draw; L = Loss

=== Play-offs ===
10 May 1997 SF 1st leg	Crystal Palace	3–1	Wolverhampton Wanderers	London
15:00 BST	Shipperley 68'; Freedman 89', 90'	Report	Smith 90'	Stadium: Selhurst Park; Attendance: 21,053 (3,200 away); Referee: Neale Barry

14 May 1997 SF 2nd leg	Wolverhampton Wanderers	2–1 (3–4 agg.)	Crystal Palace	Wolverhampton
19:45 BST	Atkins 30'; Williams 85'	Report	Hopkin 66'	Stadium: Molineux; Attendance: 26,403 (2,838 away); Referee: Clive Wilkes

=== FA Cup ===
4 January 1997 R3	Wolverhampton Wanderers	1–2	Portsmouth	Wolverhampton
15:00 GMT	Ferguson 68'	Report	McLoughlin 68'; Hall 80'	Stadium: Molineux; Attendance: 23,626; Referee: Alan Wilkie

=== League Cup ===
20 August 1996 R1.1	Swindon Town	2–0	Wolverhampton Wanderers	Swindon
19:45 BST	Allison 42'; Leitch 66'	Report		Stadium: County Ground; Attendance: 7,451; Referee: Clive Wilkes

4 September 1996 R1.2	Wolverhampton Wanderers	1–0 (1–2 agg.)	Swindon Town	Wolverhampton
19:45 BST	Osborn 5'			Stadium: Molineux; Attendance: 10,760; Referee: Scott Mathieson

== Players ==
Key:
‡ On loan from another club * First appearance(s) for the club

- # = Squad number
- Pos = Playing position
- P = Number of games played
- G = Number of goals scored
- GK = Goalkeeper
- DF = Defender
- MF = Midfielder
- FW = Forward
- = Yellow cards
- = Red cards
- † Permanent player left club during the season
- ¤ Loaned to another club for part or all of season

Correct as of end of season. Starting appearances are listed first, followed by substitute appearances in parentheses where applicable.

Pos	Name	P	G	P	G	P	G	P	G	A yellow card	A red card	Notes
Pos	Name	League		FA Cup		League Cup		Total		Discipline		Notes
GK	(England) Vince Bartram ‡	0	0	0	0	0	0	0	0	0	0	
GK	(England) Matt Murray	0	0	0	0	0	0	0	0	0	0	
GK	(Netherlands) Hans Segers	0	0	0	0	0	0	0	0	0	0	
GK	(England) Mike Stowell	48	0	1	0	2	0	51	0	0	0	
DF	(England) Keith Curle (c)	22(1)	2	0	0	0	0	22(1)	2	0	0	
DF	(Wales) Brian Law	4(3)	0	0	0	0	0	4(3)	0	0	0	
DF	(Northern Ireland) Neil Masters †	0	0	0	0	0	0	0	0	0	0	
DF	(England) Lee Naylor	0	0	0	0	0	0	0	0	0	0	
DF	(England) Dennis Pearce	4	0	0	0	0	0	4	0	0	0	
DF	(England) Dean Richards	19(2)	1	0	0	2	0	21(2)	1	0	0	
DF	(France) Serge Romano	1(3)	0	0	0	1	0	2(3)	0	0	0	
DF	(England) Jamie Smith	38(2)	1	1	0	1(1)	0	40(3)	1	0	0	
DF	(England) Andy Thompson	27(6)	2	0	0	2	0	29(6)	2	0	0	
DF	(England) Mark Venus	36(4)	0	1	0	2	0	39(4)	0	0	0	
DF	(England) Chris Westwood	0	0	0	0	0	0	0	0	0	0	
DF	(Wales) Ady Williams	8	1	0	0	0	0	8	1	0	0	
DF	(Wales) Eric Young	1	0	0	0	0	0	1	0	0	0	
MF	(England) Mark Atkins	46(1)	5	1	0	2	0	49(1)	5	0	0	
MF	(Australia) Steve Corica	33(3)	2	1	0	2	0	36(3)	2	0	0	
MF	(England) Tony Daley	0	0	0	0	0	0	0	0	0	0	
MF	(Northern Ireland) Robbie Dennison	9(5)	1	1	0	0	0	10(5)	1	0	0	
MF	(Germany) Jens Dowe ‡	5(3)	0	0	0	0	0	5(3)	0	0	0	
MF	(England) Neil Emblen	27(1)	0	1	0	0	0	28(1)	0	0	0	
MF	(Scotland) Darren Ferguson	12(6)	3	0(1)	1	1	0	13(7)	4	0	1	
MF	(England) Steve Froggatt	27	2	0	0	2	0	29	2	0	0	
MF	(Barbados) Michael Gilkes	5	1	0	0	0	0	5	1	0	0	
MF	(England) Simon Osborn	35(2)	5	1	0	1	1	37(2)	6	0	0	
MF	(England) Mark Rankine †	0	0	0	0	0	0	0	0	0	0	
MF	(Wales) Carl Robinson	1(1)	0	0	0	0	0	1(1)	0	0	0	
MF	(England) Geoff Thomas	17(7)	3	1	0	0	0	18(7)	3	0	0	
MF	(Netherlands) Robin van der Laan ‡	7	0	0	0	0	0	7	0	0	0	
MF	(England) Jermaine Wright	0(3)	0	0	0	0(2)	0	0(5)	0	0	0	
FW	(England) Steve Bull	45	23	1	0	2	0	48	23	0	1	
FW	(Republic of Ireland) Glen Crowe ¤	5(1)	0	0	0	0	0	5(1)	0	0	0	
FW	(Republic of Ireland) Dominic Foley	0(7)	1	0	0	0	0	0(7)	1	0	0	
FW	(England) Don Goodman	20(8)	6	1	0	0	0	21(8)	6	0	0	
FW	(England) Richard Leadbeater	0(1)	0	0	0	0	0	0(1)	0	0	0	
FW	(Wales) Iwan Roberts	26(9)	12	0(1)	0	2	0	28(10)	12	0	0	

== Transfers ==
=== In ===
Date	Player	From	Fee
1 July 1996	(Wales) Ady Williams	Reading	£750,000
5 July 1996	(Wales) Iwan Roberts	Leicester City	£1.3 million
31 July 1996	(England) Keith Curle	Manchester City	£650,000
12 August 1996	(France) Serge Romano	(France) Martigues	Free
30 August 1996	(Netherlands) Hans Segers	Unattached	Free
27 March 1997	(Barbados) Michael Gilkes	Reading	£150,000

=== Out ===
Date	Player	To	Fee
June 1996	(Netherlands) John de Wolf	Released	Free
June 1996	(England) Andy De Bont	Hereford United	Free
June 1996	(England) Gavin Mahon	Hereford United	Free
June 1996	(England) Steve Piearce	Doncaster Rovers	Free
June 1996	(England) Quentin Townsend	Hereford United	Free
June 1996	(South Africa) Mark Williams	Released	Free
16 July 1996	(Wales) Paul Jones	Stockport County	£60,000
20 July 1996	(England) Paul Birch	Doncaster Rovers	Free
17 September 1996	(England) Mark Rankine	Preston North End	£100,000
28 March 1997	(Northern Ireland) Neil Masters	Gillingham	£150,000

=== Loans in ===
Start date	Player	From	End date
9 October 1996	(Germany) Jens Dowe	(Germany) Hamburg	End of season
11 October 1996	(Netherlands) Robin van der Laan	Derby County	1 January 1997
26 February 1997	(England) Vince Bartram	Arsenal	14 March 1997

=== Loans out ===
Start date	Player	To	End date
21 February 1997	(Republic of Ireland) Glen Crowe	Exeter City	12 April 1997

== Management and coaching staff ==
Position	Name
Manager	Mark McGhee
Assistant manager	Colin Lee
First Team coach	Mike Hickman
Youth Development Officer	Chris Evans
Youth Team coach	Chris Turner
Club doctors	Dr Peter Ackroyd and Dr Peter Bekenn
Club Physio	Barry Holmes

== Kit ==
The season saw Puma take over as the club's kit manufacturer, and two new kits were therefore introduced. Both used a "wolf head" design to the shirts as a central feature, the home shirt using their traditional gold and black colours, while the away kit used shades of teal. In a further emphasis of the "wolf head", a new club emblen was introduced replacing the usage of the Wolverhampton city crest on the shirts that had been adopted for the previous three seasons. Both shirts featured the sponsor name of Goodyear.
