= Richard Shaw (footballer) =

English footballer and manager

Personal information
- Full name: Richard Edward Shaw
- Date of birth: 11 September 1968 (age 58)
- Place of birth: Park Royal, London, England
- Height: 1.75 m (5 ft 9 in)
- Position: Defender

Team information
- Current team: Cardiff City (assistant manager)

Youth career
- –1987: Crystal Palace

Senior career*
Years	Team	Apps	(Gls)
1987–1995	Crystal Palace	207	(3)
1989	→ Hull City (loan)	4	(0)
1995–2006	Coventry City	317	(1)
2006–2008	Millwall	59	(0)
Total		587	(4)

Managerial career
- 2007: Millwall (caretaker)
- 2012: Coventry City (caretaker)
- * Club domestic league appearances and goals as of 14:18, 25 June 2012 (UTC)

Richard Edward Shaw (born 11 September 1968) is an English football coach and former professional footballer, who is currently assistant coach of EFL Championship side Cardiff City

As a player from 1986 until 2008, he was a mainly a defender, notably in the Premier League for Crystal Palace and Coventry City as well as in the Football League for both Hull City and Millwall.

He later became a coach and joined the coaching staff at Millwall where he saw time as caretaker manager in 2007. He later returned to Coventry in 2012 as assistant manager where he also took over temporarily. The following season he re-joined Palace as their under-16 head coach, then became the under-23 head coach from 2013 in a role he held until 2019. In 2020 Shaw became assistant coach for Watford's under-23s and also was assistant coach for Canada in the Gold Cup & Nations League tournaments. He later joined Cardiff City as assistant manager in 2024.

== Playing career ==
=== Club ===
Shaw started his career at Crystal Palace, coming up through their youth system. He enjoyed a brief loan spell to Hull City before becoming a major part of the first team, playing in the 1990 FA Cup final. Crystal Palace were a yo-yo-club at the time after a promising start to the 1990s, where they also finished third in the league a year after reaching the FA Cup final. They were relegated in 1993, promoted in 1994 and relegated again in 1995, with Shaw being established as a regular player by the time they were in this period of instability. They also reached a further two League Cup semi-finals and an FA Cup semi-final in the five seasons which followed their FA Cup final appearance.

One of his more infamous moments in a Palace shirt came in January 1995, during the Eagles' home fixture against Manchester United. United midfielder Eric Cantona attempted to get on the end of a long clearance by Peter Schmeichel and was obstructed by Shaw, who had very effectively marked him out of the game. The Frenchman retaliated by kicking Shaw and was sent off. On his way from the pitch Cantona launched a 'kung-fu' style kick against a Crystal Palace fan, Matthew Simmons, followed by a series of punches. The event has become a famous part of English football's history for the wrong reasons.

Despite Shaw's best efforts throughout the season (for which he was named "Player of the Year"), Palace were relegated back to Division One. They had reached the semi-finals of both cups that season.

Shaw began the 1995–96 season still with Palace in Division One, but he signed for Coventry City in November 1995 for £1m. He performed consistently well for Coventry over 10 years, making over 350 appearances and scored his first and only goal for Coventry after over 250 games against Gillingham in May 2004. He won the "Player of the Year" award at the club in 1998/99 and the "Players' Player of the Year" award in 2002/03. Having spent a decade at Coventry where he had gained much respect from the fans, his testimonial match against Celtic in April 2006 was a big success, with the Sky Blues ending as 3–1 winners over the Scottish champions, before he was released at the end of that season.

He then moved back to south London, signing for League One side Millwall. He made himself an ever-present in the side over the next season, winning the club's "Player of the Year" award in the process, the third club at which he had won this accolade.

=== International ===
Whilst at Crystal Palace Shaw was called up to the England squad by Terry Venables as cover for the Umbro Cup in 1995. However, he was ultimately never capped by the senior side.

== Coaching career ==
In October 2007, while still a player, Shaw was appointed caretaker manager of Millwall after the sacking of Willie Donachie. The club appointed Kenny Jackett as manager on 6 November 2007, after which Shaw played very little. Approaching his 40th birthday, he retired at the end of the 2007–08 season and took up a coaching role with the South London club.

Prior to the start of the 2012–13 season, Shaw left Millwall to take up the assistant manager's position at his previous club Coventry City, working under his former Crystal Palace teammate Andy Thorn. The Midlands side had removed their previous assistant manager Steve Harrison following the club's relegation from the Championship. After the club drew their opening three games of the League One season, Thorn was sacked and Shaw was appointed caretaker manager, working alongside first-team coach Lee Carsley. His first game in charge saw Coventry defeat local rivals Birmingham City 3–2 in the League Cup. At this time Shaw succeeded in reaching the final shortlist for the permanent manager's post alongside Mark Robins and Paul Ince. Shaw managed five further Coventry matches, winning a Football League Trophy tie against Burton Albion on penalties, but losing four consecutive league games. On 19 September, the day after the last of those matches, a 4–1 defeat at recently promoted Shrewsbury Town, Robins was appointed permanent manager of Coventry. Shaw returned to his position of assistant manager, but Steve Taylor, Robins's colleague at Barnsley and Rotherham, was appointed first-team coach and Shaw's contract was ultimately terminated 27 days after the appointment of the new manager.

By January 2013, Shaw was an under 16 head coach and then became under-23 head coach at Crystal Palace. In October 2019, the club issued a statement announcing that Shaw was to leave "to pursue other opportunities". Shaw joined Watford in January 2021, working as under-23 assistant coach under Omer Riza.In 2023 Shaw joined the Canada staff for the Nations League & Gold Cup tournaments held in Canada & USA. In December 2024, Shaw was appointed as an assistant manager to Riza at Cardiff City.

== Career statistics ==
Source: Richard Shaw at the English National Football Archive (subscription required)

Appearances and goals by club, season and competition
Club	Season	League			FA Cup		League Cup		Other		Total	
Club	Season	Division	Apps	Goals	Apps	Goals	Apps	Goals	Apps	Goals	Apps	Goals
Crystal Palace	1987–88	Second Division	3	0	0	0	1	0	0	0	4	0
Crystal Palace	1988–89	Second Division	14	0	0	0	1	0	2 (Note: Appearances in Full Members' Cup)	0	17	0
Crystal Palace	1989–90	First Division	21	0	5	0	4	0	3	0	33	0
Crystal Palace	1990–91	First Division	36	1	3	0	5	0	6	0	50	1
Crystal Palace	1991–92	First Division	10	0	0	0	0	0	0	0	10	0
Crystal Palace	1992–93	Premier League	33	0	1	0	4	0	—		38	0
Crystal Palace	1993–94	First Division	34	2	1	0	4	0	2 (Note: Appearances in Anglo-Italian Cup)	0	41	2
Crystal Palace	1994–95	Premier League	41	0	8	0	7	0	—		56	0
Crystal Palace	1995–96	First Division	15	0	—		4	0	—		19	0
Crystal Palace	Total		207	3	18	0	30	0	13	0	268	3
Hull City (loan)	1989–90	Second Division	4	0	—		—		—		4	0
Coventry City	1995–96	Premier League	21	0	3	0	—		—		24	0
Coventry City	1996–97	Premier League	35	0	4	0	3	0	—		42	0
Coventry City	1997–98	Premier League	33	0	3	0	4	0	—		40	0
Coventry City	1998–99	Premier League	37	0	3	0	3	0	—		43	0
Coventry City	1999–2000	Premier League	29	0	1	0	2	0	—		32	0
Coventry City	2000–01	Premier League	24	0	1	0	3	0	—		28	0
Coventry City	2001–02	First Division	32	0	1	0	2	0	—		35	0
Coventry City	2002–03	First Division	29	0	2	0	2	0	—		33	0
Coventry City	2003–04	First Division	19	1	1	0	1	0	—		21	1
Coventry City	2004–05	Championship	33	0	1	0	3	0	—		37	0
Coventry City	2005–06	Championship	25	0	2	0	0	0	—		27	0
Coventry City	Total		317	1	22	0	23	0	—		362	1
Millwall	2006–07	League One	41	0	4	0	1	0	1 (Note: Appearances in Football League Trophy)	0	47	0
Millwall	2007–08	League One	18	0	0	0	0	0	0	0	18	0
Millwall	Total		59	0	4	0	1	0	1	0	65	0
Career total			587	4	44	0	54	0	14	0	699	4

== Honours ==
Crystal Palace

- Football League First Division: 1993–94
- Full Members' Cup: 1990–91
- FA Cup runner-up: 1989–90

Individual

- Crystal Palace Young Player of the Year: 1986
- Crystal Palace Player of the Year: 1994–95
- Coventry City Player of the Year: 1998–99, 2001–02
- Coventry City Hall of Fame
- Millwall Player of the Year 2006–07

== Other endeavours ==
Richard Shaw Football Development
