= Nigel Martyn =

English footballer (born 1966)

Personal information
- Full name: Antony Nigel Martyn
- Date of birth: 11 August 1966 (age 60)
- Place of birth: St Austell, Cornwall, England
- Height: 6 ft 2 in (1.88 m)
- Position: Goalkeeper

Senior career*
Years	Team	Apps	(Gls)
1986–1987	St Blazey		
1987–1989	Bristol Rovers	101	(0)
1989–1996	Crystal Palace	272	(0)
1996–2003	Leeds United	207	(0)
2003–2006	Everton	86	(0)
Total		666	(0)

International career
1988–1989	England U21	11	(0)
1989–1994	England B	6	(0)
1992–2002	England	23	(0)
- * Club domestic league appearances and goals

Antony Nigel Martyn (born 11 August 1966) is an English former professional footballer player who played as a goalkeeper.

He notably played in the Premier League for Crystal Palace, Leeds United and Everton, having initially played in the Football League with Bristol Rovers. His move to Palace saw him become the first £1 million goalkeeper in British football and was a member of the Palace side that lost the 1990 Cup Final and won the Full Members Cup in 1991. An ankle injury forced him to retire in 2006. He won 23 England caps between 1992 and 2002 and was a member of the national squad at four major tournaments.

Following retirement, Martyn briefly held a role as goalkeeping coach for Bradford City but has not returned to the sport since 2009.

== Club career ==
=== Early career ===
Martyn started his career as a midfielder until invited to play as a goalkeeper for his brother's works team when he was 17. He started by playing amateur football for Cornish sides Heavy Transport FC, Bugle and St Blazey while working in a plastics factory and for a coal merchant, before beginning his professional career with Bristol Rovers in 1987 after apparently having been "spotted" by Rovers' tea lady Vi Harris, whilst she was on holiday.

=== Crystal Palace ===
Martyn was transferred to Crystal Palace for a fee of £1 million in 1989, becoming the first goalkeeper to attract a million-pound transfer fee in English football. He remained at Palace for seven seasons, appearing 349 times for his club, including the 1990 FA Cup Final, where Palace were beaten by Manchester United in a replay, and the 1991 Full Members' Cup final, where Palace beat Everton. In 1996, he signed with Leeds United, setting another record fee for a goalkeeper of £2.25 million.

In 2005, Palace supporters voted Martyn into their Centenary XI.

=== Leeds United ===
Martyn was signed by boss Howard Wilkinson in the summer of 1996–97, along with another high-profile capture in the form of Lee Bowyer. Martyn's form for United, both at home and on the continent in European competition was skillful – most notably in a man-of-the-match display at the Stadio Olimpico against Roma in the 1999-2000 UEFA Cup campaign, when Leeds reached the semi-finals. Martyn was also a large part of the squad that eliminated illustrious clubs such as Barcelona, Lazio and Deportivo La Coruna in the following season's UEFA Champions League campaign, leading them to the last four.

In total, Martyn played as Leeds' first-choice goalkeeper for six seasons and his consistency was such that years later at a supporters' dinner, the Cornishman was named officially as United's greatest ever goalkeeper, beating off competition from the likes of Gary Sprake, David Harvey, and John Lukic – all three being men who won championship medals at Elland Road.

However, it was a disagreement with new Leeds manager Terry Venables, combined with the increasingly good form of youngster Paul Robinson, that kept him from playing any games in Leeds' 2002–03 season and after a string of unused substitute appearances, Martyn was told he could find new employers.

On 10 April 2006, he was voted as part of Leeds United's greatest team; he was the only player from after the Revie era to be selected. He is still well regarded by the Leeds United fans and was involved in the "Back the Bid Leeds" campaign for Leeds to be one of the host cities in England's 2018 FIFA World Cup bid.

=== Everton ===
In the middle of 2003, Leeds were approached by Chelsea and Everton with offers to sign Martyn. Both clubs were offering the out-of-favour goalkeeper a backup post: at Chelsea, he would understudy Carlo Cudicini; at Everton, the first-choice was Richard Wright. Martyn chose to move to Everton, and six games into the season, an injury to Wright gave him his Everton debut. His performances for the first team during Wright's recovery were such that Martyn remained Everton's first-choice goalkeeper even after Wright returned from injury.

Martyn was one of Everton's best performers in the 2004–05 season when they achieved their best Premier League finish of fourth. Many fans believed that Martyn almost single-handedly stopped them from slipping down the table after Thomas Gravesen's departure. He produced some of the best form of his career, despite being 38 years of age, to the delight of the Everton fans, with whom he remains a favourite. In his final season at Everton he was picking up many injuries and missed the remainder of the season. His final appearance for Everton was his 100th game for the club against Chelsea in an FA Cup tie at Goodison Park which ended 1–1, making numerous excellent saves. He was nicknamed "Big Nige" by Everton fans, a play on Neville Southall's "Big Nev" nickname.

On 8 June 2006, Martyn announced his retirement from football due to a stress fracture in his ankle that had sidelined him since January and failed to heal properly. David Moyes said that he would miss Martyn and described him as his "greatest ever signing".

== International career ==
Martyn made his debut for the England national side against the Commonwealth of Independent States in Moscow in 1992, becoming one of the few Cornishmen to play for England. He earned 23 caps for his national side, spending the peak of his career as second-choice goalkeeper behind David Seaman.

Martyn replaced the injured Seaman for England's final UEFA Euro 2000 group match against Romania, a 3–2 defeat. In Sven-Göran Eriksson's first game in charge of England against Spain in February 2001, Martyn came on as a substitute for David James and saved a Javi Moreno penalty in a 3–0 win. He also started in goal for a 2–2 draw with Greece at Old Trafford that qualified England for the 2002 FIFA World Cup.

Martyn was selected for the England squad at both the 1998 and 2002 FIFA World Cups, remaining second choice behind Arsenal's David Seaman at both tournaments.

== Coaching career ==
Martyn spent time as goalkeeping coach at Bradford City, a role he started in March 2007 as a favour for former Leeds United teammate David Wetherall, who was then caretaker manager at Bradford.

== Personal life ==
Martyn grew up supporting Plymouth Argyle.

While still in Cornwall he was also a cricketer, and played with Cornwall Schoolboys as a wicket-keeper, as well as Fowey Cricket Club. Since his retirement from professional football, he has returned to cricket, playing regularly for a Leeds team called Leeds Modernians in the Airedale & Wharfedale Senior Cricket League. As a player for Knaresborough C.C., alongside another former England goalkeeper, Paul Robinson, he won promotion to the Yorkshire Premier League North, in 2024. In 2026 he was selected for England’s over-60s cricket team. His son Thomas is an opera singer.

== Career statistics ==
=== Club ===
Appearances and goals by club, season and competition
Club	Season	League			FA Cup		League Cup		Europe		Other		Total	
Club	Season	Division	Apps	Goals	Apps	Goals	Apps	Goals	Apps	Goals	Apps	Goals	Apps	Goals
Bristol Rovers	1987–88	Third Division	39	0	4	0	2	0	—		2 (Note: Appearance(s) in Associate Members' Cup)	0	47	0
Bristol Rovers	1988–89	Third Division	46	0	2	0	2	0	—		8 (Note: Four appearances in Associate Members' Cup, four in Third Division play-offs)	0	58	0
Bristol Rovers	1989–90	Third Division	16	0	—		2	0	—		1	0	19	0
Bristol Rovers	Total		101	0	6	0	6	0	—		11	0	124	0
Crystal Palace	1989–90	First Division	25	0	7	0	—		—		5 (Note: Appearance(s) in Full Members' Cup)	0	37	0
Crystal Palace	1990–91	First Division	38	0	3	0	5	0	—		6	0	52	0
Crystal Palace	1991–92	First Division	38	0	1	0	8	0	—		3	0	50	0
Crystal Palace	1992–93	Premier League	42	0	1	0	8	0	—		—		51	0
Crystal Palace	1993–94	First Division	46	0	1	0	4	0	—		2 (Note: Appearances in Anglo-Italian Cup)	0	53	0
Crystal Palace	1994–95	Premier League	37	0	7	0	7	0	—		—		51	0
Crystal Palace	1995–96	First Division	46	0	2	0	4	0	—		3 (Note: Appearances in First Division play-offs)	0	55	0
Crystal Palace	Total		272	0	22	0	36	0	—		19	0	349	0
Leeds United	1996–97	Premier League	37	0	4	0	3	0	—		—		44	0
Leeds United	1997–98	Premier League	37	0	4	0	4	0	—		—		45	0
Leeds United	1998–99	Premier League	34	0	5	0	1	0	4 (Note: Appearances in UEFA Cup)	0	—		44	0
Leeds United	1999–2000	Premier League	38	0	3	0	2	0	12	0	—		55	0
Leeds United	2000–01	Premier League	23	0	1	0	0	0	12 (Note: Appearances in UEFA Champions League)	0	—		36	0
Leeds United	2001–02	Premier League	38	0	1	0	2	0	8	0	—		49	0
Leeds United	2002–03	Premier League	0	0	0	0	0	0	—		—		0	0
Leeds United	Total		207	0	18	0	12	0	36	0	—		273	0
Everton	2003–04	Premier League	34	0	3	0	3	0	—		—		40	0
Everton	2004–05	Premier League	32	0	1	0	0	0	—		—		33	0
Everton	2005–06	Premier League	20	0	2	0	1	0	4 (Note: Two appearances in UEFA Champions League, two in UEFA Cup)	0	—		27	0
Everton	Total		86	0	6	0	4	0	4	0	—		100	0
Career total			666	0	52	0	58	0	40	0	30	0	846	0

=== International ===
Appearances and goals by national team and year
National team	Year	Apps	Goals
England	1992	2	0
England	1993	1	0
England	1997	2	0
England	1998	3	0
England	1999	4	0
England	2000	2	0
England	2001	5	0
England	2002	4	0
Total		23	0

== Honours ==
Crystal Palace

- Football League First Division: 1993–94
- Full Members' Cup: 1990–91
- FA Cup runner-up: 1989–90

England

- Tournoi de France: 1997

Individual

- Toulon Tournament Best Goalkeeper: 1988
- PFA Team of the Year: 1988–89 Third Division, 1993–94 First Division, 1997–98 Premier League, 1998–99 Premier League, 1999–2000 Premier League
- Bristol Rovers Player of the Year: 1989
- Leeds United Player of the Year: 1997
- Most clean sheets in the Premier League: 1996–97, 2001–02
