= Simon Osborn =

English footballer (born 1972)

Personal information
- Full name: Simon Edward Osborn
- Date of birth: 19 January 1972 (age 54)
- Place of birth: New Addington, England
- Height: 5 ft 8 in (1.73 m)
- Position: Midfielder

Youth career
- 1988–1990: Crystal Palace

Senior career*
Years	Team	Apps	(Gls)
1990–1994	Crystal Palace	55	(5)
1994–1995	Reading	32	(5)
1995	Queens Park Rangers	9	(1)
1995–2001	Wolverhampton Wanderers	162	(11)
2001	→ Tranmere Rovers (loan)	9	(1)
2001	Port Vale	7	(0)
2001–2003	Gillingham	46	(5)
2003–2006	Walsall	113	(5)
2006	Hereford United	1	(0)
2006–2008	Bromley	54	(2)
2008–2009	Croydon Athletic		
2009	Cray Wanderers		
2010	Cray Wanderers		
2010–201?	Erith & Belvedere		
2013	Margate	1	(0)
Total		489	(35)

Managerial career
- 2008: Bromley
- 2013: Margate
- * Club domestic league appearances and goals

Simon Edward Osborn (born 19 January 1972) is an English former football player and football manager. A midfielder, he played 395 league and cup games in a 17-year career in the English Football League.

He began his career with Crystal Palace, helping the club to the First Division title in 1993–94 before he made a £90,000 move to Reading. He helped the "Royals" to a second-place finish in the First Division in 1994–95, though they were then beaten in the play-off final. He made a £1.1 million move to Queens Park Rangers in July 1995, before being sold to Wolverhampton Wanderers for £1 million in December 1995. After six years and 185 appearances at Molineux, he was loaned out to Tranmere Rovers before switching to Port Vale in September 2001. He moved on to Gillingham the following month before he joined Walsall in July 2003.

He joined Hereford United in the summer of 2006 before moving into non-League football with Bromley. He helped the club to win promotion out of the Isthmian League in 2007 and briefly served the club as manager in 2008. He then joined Croydon Athletic before scoring the winning goal for Cray Wanderers in the Isthmian League Division One South play-off final. In 2010, he became a player-coach at Erith & Belvedere. He joined the coaching staff at Margate in 2013 and was appointed joint manager with Craig Holloway in April 2013 before losing his job eight months later.

== Playing career ==
=== Crystal Palace ===
Osborn was educated at Ashburton High School, now known as Oasis Academy Shirley Park, Croydon, from 1983 to 1989. A central midfielder, Osborn started his career as a trainee at Crystal Palace in January 1990 under the stewardship of Steve Coppell. He turned professional for the 1989–90 season which saw him voted Young Player of the Year by the club's fans. They went on to finish third in 1990–91, one of the best finishes in the club's history. They then dropped to tenth in 1991–92, enough to secure them a place as founder members of the Premier League. They were relegated in 20th-place in 1992–93, though had they won their final game of the season then Oldham Athletic would have taken their place in the relegation zone. Osborn scored in the League Cup semi-finals in 1993, Palace's consolation in a 5–1 aggregate defeat to Arsenal. New boss Alan Smith led the "Eagles" to the First Division title in 1993–94, Osborn's last season at Selhurst Park.

=== Reading ===
Reading manager Mark McGhee handed over £90,000 for his services at the start of the 1994–95 season on 17 August. The "Royals" narrowly missed out on a second-successive promotion as Osborn formed a vital part of the team that finished second in the First Division. They went on to lose 4–3 to Bolton Wanderers in the play-off final at Wembley; the game was necessary due to the Premier League's reduction in size only allowing one automatic promotion place.

=== Queens Park Rangers ===
As a result of Reading's failure to secure promotion, Osborn decided to move away from Elm Park to gain Premier League experience. He got his wish when Queens Park Rangers manager Ray Wilkins splashed out £1.1 million for the midfielder in July 1995. Osborn lasted just six months at QPR, scoring once (against Bolton Wanderers) in nine Premier League games for a side who ended the season in the relegation places, before moving back down a division and signing for Mark McGhee's Wolverhampton Wanderers for a £1 million transfer fee.

=== Wolverhampton Wanderers ===
McGhee steered the club to a 20th-place finish in 1995–96, just three points above relegated Millwall. Osborn scored six goals in 39 games in 1996–97, as Wolves finished third, four points behind Barnsley in the automatic promotion places; they went on to lose to his former club Crystal Palace at the play-off semi-finals. They missed out on the play-offs by three places and nine points in 1997–98, Osborn scoring twice in 26 games, including one against former club QPR. That season, Wolves also got to the FA Cup semi-final, but Osborn missed the game against Arsenal due to suspension. Early in the 1998–99 season McGhee was sacked, and replaced by his assistant Colin Lee. Wolves finished seventh, one place and three points behind Bolton Wanderers in the play-offs; Osborn scored three goals in 42 appearances. The 1999–2000 season saw Bolton again finish sixth, one place and just two points ahead of Wolves; Osborn was limited to 26 appearances. Following a poor start to 2000–01, Colin Lee was replaced by Dave Jones in January 2001. Two months later Osborn was loaned out to league rivals Tranmere Rovers for three months, where he scored once against Fulham. At the end of the season his six-year stay at Molineux was brought to an end, after 185 appearances for the club.

=== Port Vale to Gillingham ===
In September 2001, he moved on a free transfer to Brian Horton's Port Vale in the Second Division. He played eight games in four weeks at Vale Park, before moving back up to the First Division with Gillingham. He scored three goals in 30 games for Andy Hessenthaler's "Gills" in 2001–02. He missed September to March of the 2002–03 campaign and left the Priestfield Stadium after 49 league and cup appearances for the club.

=== Walsall ===
Osborn signed for Walsall in July 2003, who were then managed by his former boss Colin Lee. However, Lee left the club in April 2004. Osborn briefly served as assistant to new manager Paul Merson. The "Saddlers" suffered relegation out of the First Division in 2003–04, with Osborn scoring three goals in 46 appearances. Ironically, they finished behind his former club, Gillingham, who avoided the drop on goal difference. Osborn then played 41 games as Walsall finished 11th in League One in 2004–05. He picked up ten yellow cards and two goals in his 36 appearances in 2005–06, as Walsall finished last and suffered relegation into League Two; this was to prove to be his last season at the Bescot Stadium.

=== Later career ===
Osborn started the 2006–07 campaign with Hereford United, a club Graham Turner had led to promotion back to the Football League after nine years in the Conference. However, he played just once for the "Bulls" and moved on to Bromley in September 2006. The "Ravens" finished the 2006–07 season as runners-up of the Isthmian League and beat Billericay Town in the play-off final to win promotion into the Conference South. He was appointed player-manager of Bromley in January 2008, assisted by Bobby Bowry, but resigned three months later following a change in ownership, having led them to an eleventh-place finish in 2007–08. He both succeeded and was preceded by Mark Goldberg. Osborn then moved on to Croydon Athletic of the Isthmian League Division One South.

He signed for league rivals Cray Wanderers in February 2009, appearing on the bench against Ashford Town and making his debut for the club in March against Walton & Hersham. He scored the only goal for the Wanderers in their 1–0 victory in the play-off final against Metropolitan Police. He left the club at the end of the season and retired from playing football, opting to look for a coaching role elsewhere. However, he returned from retirement in March 2010 to re-sign for Cray Wanderers. Osborn scored in the final game against Horsham for the second successive season. He was then appointed as player-coach at Erith & Belvedere of the Kent League.

== Managerial career ==
Osborn joined the coaching staff at Margate in January 2013 as assistant to caretaker manager Craig Holloway. He was appointed joint-manager with Craig Holloway in April 2013. He became sole manager in November 2013, but was sacked a month later.

== Career statistics ==
Appearances and goals by club, season and competition
Club	Season	League			FA Cup		Other		Total	
Club	Season	Division	Apps	Goals	Apps	Goals	Apps	Goals	Apps	Goals
Crystal Palace	1990–91	First Division	4	0	0	0	1	0	5	0
Crystal Palace	1991–92	First Division	14	2	0	0	7	0	21	2
Crystal Palace	1992–93	Premier League	31	2	1	0	7	1	39	3
Crystal Palace	1993–94	First Division	6	1	1	0	0	0	7	1
Crystal Palace	Total		55	5	2	0	15	1	72	6
Reading	1994–95	First Division	32	5	0	0	7	0	39	5
Queens Park Rangers	1995–96	Premier League	9	1	0	0	2	0	11	1
Wolverhampton Wanderers	1995–96	First Division	21	2	4	0	0	0	25	2
Wolverhampton Wanderers	1996–97	First Division	35	5	1	0	3	1	39	6
Wolverhampton Wanderers	1997–98	First Division	24	2	3	0	0	0	27	2
Wolverhampton Wanderers	1998–99	First Division	37	2	1	0	4	1	42	3
Wolverhampton Wanderers	1999–2000	First Division	25	0	1	0	0	0	26	0
Wolverhampton Wanderers	2000–01	First Division	20	0	2	0	2	1	24	1
Wolverhampton Wanderers	Total		162	11	12	0	9	3	183	14
Tranmere Rovers (loan)	2000–01	First Division	9	1	0	0	0	0	9	1
Port Vale	2001–02	Second Division	7	0	0	0	1	0	8	0
Gillingham	2001–02	First Division	28	4	3	0	0	0	31	4
Gillingham	2002–03	First Division	18	1	0	0	0	0	18	1
Gillingham	Total		46	5	3	0	0	0	49	5
Walsall	2003–04	First Division	43	3	1	0	2	0	46	3
Walsall	2004–05	League One	38	0	1	0	2	0	41	0
Walsall	2005–06	League One	32	2	3	0	1	0	36	2
Walsall	Total		113	5	5	0	5	0	123	5
Hereford United	2006–07	League Two	1	0	0	0	0	0	1	0
Bromley	2006–07	Isthmian League; Premier Division	29	2	0	0	0	0	29	2
Bromley	2007–08	Conference South	25	0	0	0	0	0	25	0
Bromley	Total		54	2	0	0	0	0	54	2
Margate	2012–13	Isthmian League; Premier Division	1	0	0	0	0	0	1	0
Career total			489	35	22	0	39	4	550	39

== Honours ==
Crystal Palace

- Football League First Division: 1993–94

Bromley

- Isthmian League play-offs: 2006–07

Cray Wanderers

- Isthmian League Division One South play-offs: 2009
