= Ricky Newman =

English footballer

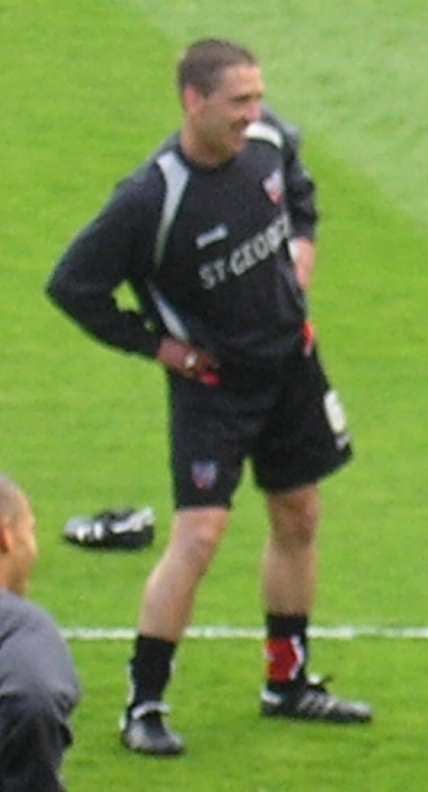
- Newman warming up for Brentford in 2006.

Personal information
- Full name: Richard Adrian Newman
- Date of birth: 5 August 1970 (age 56)
- Place of birth: Guildford, England
- Height: 5 ft 10 in (1.78 m)
- Position: Utility player

Youth career
- –1988: Crystal Palace

Senior career*
Years	Team	Apps	(Gls)
1988–1995	Crystal Palace	48	(3)
1992	→ Maidstone United (loan)	10	(1)
1995–2000	Millwall	150	(5)
2000	→ Reading (loan)	7	(1)
2000–2005	Reading	114	(0)
2005–2006	Brentford	30	(3)
2006–2009	Aldershot Town	69	(2)
2010–2014	Cranleigh	82	(18)
Total		522	(34)

Managerial career
- 2008–2009: Aldershot Town (reserves)
- * Club domestic league appearances and goals

Richard Adrian Newman (born 5 August 1970) is an English football coach and former professional footballer who played as a utility player.

He notably played in the Premier League for Crystal Palace for several seasons and in the Football League for Millwall, Reading, Brentford and Aldershot Town. Described as a "tough tackler", he also played non-League football for Maidstone United and Cranleigh.

Following retirement he briefly moved into coaching and managed Aldershot Town's reserve team during the 2008–09 season.

== Career ==
=== Crystal Palace ===
Newman began his career in the youth system at Crystal Palace and signed his first professional contract in January 1988. Palace's promotions through the divisions meant that Newman had a slow start to life at Selhurst Park and he time on loan at Fourth Division club Maidstone United late in the 1991–92 season. After winning a First Division championship medal at the end of the 1993–94 season, he went on to become a regular in the Premier League during 1994–95, making 46 appearances and scoring three goals. Newman left Crystal Palace in July 1995, having made 62 appearances and scored three goals during seven and a half years as a professional at Selhurst Park.

=== Millwall ===
Newman joined First Division club Millwall for a £500,000 fee on 19 July 1995. He made 41 appearances and scored one goal during a 1995–96 season in which the Lions occupied either of the two automatic promotion places between August and December 1995 and collapsed in the second half of the season to suffer relegation to the Second Division. Newman remained with Millwall for four further seasons in the Second Division and departed The Den in July 2000, having made 168 appearances and scored five goals.

=== Reading ===
On 18 March 2000, Newman joined Second Division club Reading on loan until the end of the 1999–00 season. He made seven appearances and scored one goal during his spell and joined the Royals on a permanent basis on 25 July 2000. He featured as virtual ever-present during the 2000–01 season, before suffering a cruciate ligament injury after 49 minutes of a 2–2 draw with Walsall on 21 April 2001.

After two operations on his right knee, Newman returned fit for the 2002–03 pre-season. With the Royals now playing in the First Division, a back injury delayed Newman's comeback until 7 September 2002 and he went on to make 32 appearances during the season. He signed a new one-year contract during the 2003 off-season and turned down a move to Leyton Orient to secure another extension one year later. Newman was released by the Premier League-bound club at the end of the 2004–05 season and in just over five years at the Madejski Stadium, he made 137 appearances and scored two goals.

=== Brentford ===
Newman joined League One club Brentford on a one-year contract on 10 June 2005. The move reunited him with manager Martin Allen, previously assistant manager at Reading. Newman was named captain, but was sidelined by an injury to his right knee in July, which required three operations to correct. Newman finally made his debut in a Football League Trophy first round shootout defeat to Oxford United on 18 October 2005 and played the full 120 minutes. He was a presence in the midfield, amassing 10 yellow cards and one red during the course of the 2005–06 season. Promotion-chasing Brentford's season came to an end after a 3–1 aggregate defeat to Swansea City in the playoff semi-finals. Newman was released in May 2006 and made 39 appearances and three goals during the 2005–06 season.

=== Aldershot Town ===
Newman dropped down to the Conference Premier to join Aldershot Town on a free transfer on 1 August 2006. He made 41 appearances during the 2006–07 season and signed a new one-year contract at the end of the campaign, but was forced to undergo surgery on a cartilage problem in July 2007. Newman returned to the team on 1 September 2007 and had a successful season, winning the Conference Premier title (which secured promotion to the Football League) and the Conference League Cup. In May 2008, Newman signed a new one-year contract and was named as reserve team coach by manager Gary Waddock. He made 19 appearances during his final season of professional football and was released in May 2009, due to budget constraints. During his three seasons at the Recreation Ground, Newman made 92 appearances and scored two goals.

=== Cranleigh ===
Newman returned to football when he joined Surrey County Intermediate League (Western) First Division club Cranleigh early in the 2010–11 season. He had a successful first season with the club, scoring 11 goals in 24 appearances and winning promotion to the Premier Division. He played on with the club in the Premier Division for three further seasons and made his final appearance, at age 43, on 25 January 2014.

== Career statistics ==
Appearances and goals by club, season and competition
Club	Season	League			FA Cup		League Cup		Other		Total	
Club	Season	Division	Apps	Goals	Apps	Goals	Apps	Goals	Apps	Goals	Apps	Goals
Crystal Palace	1992–93	Premier League	2	0	0	0	0	0	—		2	0
Crystal Palace	1993–94	First Division	11	0	0	0	0	0	0	0	11	0
Crystal Palace	1994–95	Premier League	35	3	6	0	5	0	—		46	3
Crystal Palace	Total		48	3	7	0	5	0	2	0	62	3
Maidstone United (loan)	1991–92	Fourth Division	10	1	—		—		—		10	1
Millwall	1995–96	First Division	36	1	2	0	3	0	—		41	1
Millwall	1996–97	Second Division	41	3	0	0	2	0	0	0	43	3
Millwall	1997–98	Second Division	35	1	1	0	4	0	1 (Note: Appearances in Football League Trophy)	0	41	1
Millwall	1998–99	Second Division	24	0	0	0	2	0	3	0	29	0
Millwall	1999–00	Second Division	14	0	0	0	0	0	0	0	14	0
Millwall	Total		150	5	3	0	11	0	4	0	168	5
Reading (loan)	1999–2000	Second Division	7	1	—		—		—		7	1
Reading	2000–01	Second Division	39	0	3	1	1	0	1	0	44	1
Reading	2002–03	First Division	28	0	2	0	1	0	1 (Note: Appearance in First Division play-offs)	0	32	0
Reading	2003–04	First Division	30	0	2	0	3	0	—		35	0
Reading	2004–05	Championship	17	0	1	0	1	0	—		19	0
Reading	Total		121	1	8	1	6	0	2	0	137	2
Brentford	2005–06	League One	30	3	6	0	0	0	3 (Note: 2 appearances in League One play-offs, 1 appearance in Football League Trophy)	0	39	3
Aldershot Town	2006–07	Conference Premier	37	0	4	0	—		1 (Note: Appearance in FA Trophy)	0	41	0
Aldershot Town	2007–08	Conference Premier	27	3	1	0	—		2 (Note: Appearances in Conference League Cup)	0	30	2
Aldershot Town	2008–09	League Two	17	0	1	0	0	0	1	0	19	0
Aldershot Town	Total		81	3	6	0	0	0	4	0	91	2
Cranleigh	2010–11	Surrey County Intermediate League (Western) First Division	21	8	—		—		2 (Note: 1 appearance and 1 goal in Surrey Intermediate League Premier Challenge Cup, 1 appearance in Surrey Intermediate Cup)	1	23	9
Cranleigh	2011–12	Surrey County Intermediate League (Western) Premier Division	24	5	—		—		4 (Note: 3 appearances in Surrey Intermediate Cup, 1 appearance in Surrey Intermediate League Premier Challenge Cup)	0	28	5
Cranleigh	2012–13	Surrey County Intermediate League (Western) Premier Division	26	4	—		—		3 (Note: 2 appearances in Surrey Intermediate Cup, 1 appearance in Surrey Intermediate League Premier Challenge Cup)	0	29	4
Cranleigh	2013–14	Surrey County Intermediate League (Western) Premier Division	11	1	—		—		3 (Note: 2 appearances in Surrey Intermediate League Premier Challenge Cup, 1 appearance in Surrey Intermediate Cup)	0	14	1
Cranleigh	Total		82	18	—		—		12	1	94	19
Career total			522	34	16	1	22	0	27	1	587	36

== Honours ==
Crystal Palace

- Football League First Division: 1993–94

Millwall

- Football League Trophy runner-up: 1998–99

Reading

- Football League Championship: 2004–05

Aldershot Town

- Conference Premier: 2007–08
- Conference League Cup: 2007–08
- Hampshire Senior Cup: 2006–07

Cranleigh

- Surrey County Intermediate League (Western) First Division: 2010–11
