= Richard Flash =

English footballer

Personal information
- Full name: Richard Garfield Flash
- Date of birth: 8 April 1976 (age 50)
- Place of birth: Birmingham, England
- Position: Midfielder

Youth career
- ?–1992: Aston Villa
- 1992–1995: Manchester United

Senior career*
Years	Team	Apps	(Gls)
1995	Manchester United	0	(0)
1995–1996	Wolverhampton Wanderers	0	(0)
1996–1998	Watford	1	(0)
1997–1998	→ Lincoln City (loan)	5	(0)
1998–1999	Plymouth Argyle	5	(0)
Total		11	(0)
- * Club domestic league appearances and goals

Richard Garfield Flash (born 8 April 1976) is an English former footballer. He made eleven appearances in the Football League for Watford, Lincoln City and Plymouth Argyle, before retiring due to injury in 1999.

== Early life ==
Flash was born in Birmingham. As a schoolboy he was scouted by Liverpool, Arsenal, Aston Villa and Manchester United; Manchester United scout Geoff Watson persuaded him to sign schoolboy forms, and he went on to captain United's West Midland youth team, the Manchester Eagles, for three years, winning the Keele Classic at under-14 level. In 1990, he turned down the opportunity to move to the F.A's National School of Excellence at Lilleshall to train locally with Aston Villa and Birmingham City, in addition to Manchester United. However, an injury to his right knee at age 14 hampered his development.

== Youth career ==
In 1992, he joined the ranks at Manchester United with Michael Appleton, Terry Cooke, David Johnson and Jovan Kirovski. During his seven-year club career, he played at youth team and reserve level. However, another knee injury sustained early in his Manchester United career, this time a dislocated right patella, forced him onto the sidelines for two years.

== Senior career ==
In 1995 Flash was signed by Graham Taylor and moved to reserve team level at Wolverhampton Wanderers. Graham Taylor re-signed him at Watford, where he made his senior debut as a substitute on 3 May 1997, but this was his only appearance for the club. After a brief spell on loan at Lincoln City he was injured again and sidelined for 6 months. Graham Taylor released him in 1998 but recommended him to Kevin Hodges at Plymouth Argyle, where he suffered a career-ending dislocation of his left patella in the 1998–99 season.

== Personal life ==
Flash has a master's degree and has been manager of a branch of Goals Soccer Centres, a five-a-side football company; as of October 2014 he is head of the academic department at UCFB.
