= Andy De Bont =

English footballer

Personal information
- Date of birth: 7 February 1974 (age 52)
- Place of birth: Wolverhampton, England
- Height: 6 ft 2 in (1.88 m)
- Position: Goalkeeper

Youth career
- Wolverhampton Wanderers

Senior career*
Years	Team	Apps	(Gls)
1994–1997	Wolverhampton Wanderers	0	(0)
1995	→ Hartlepool United (loan)	1	(0)
1996	→ Hereford United (loan)	6	(0)
1996–1998	Hereford United	27	(0)
1998–2000	Stourbridge		
2000–2003	Moor Green		
2003–2004	Willenhall Town		
- * Club domestic league appearances and goals

Andy De Bont (born 7 February 1974) is an English former footballer who played as a goalkeeper. He played in the Football League for both Hartlepool and Hereford United. After retirement Andy has since become a Vicar and regularly conducts ceremonies at All Saints Church in Sedgley

== Career ==
De Bont began his career as a trainee with Wolverhampton Wanderers, but despite signing professional terms with the club was never to play a first team match for them.

He made his senior debut in 1995 during a loan spell at Hartlepool United. De Bont then made a second loan move in February 1996 when he reunited with his former Wolves manager Graham Turner now at Third Division Hereford United, a move during which he made eight appearances.

Unable to break into the Wolves team he made a permanent move to Hereford in Summer 1996 on a free transfer. He was a regular starter in the team during the first half of the 1996–97 season, that ultimately ended in relegation from the Football League.

He remained with the Bulls for a further season in the non-league before spells at Stourbridge, Moor Green and Willenhall Town.
