= Mark Hawthorne (footballer) =

Scottish footballer

Personal information
- Full name: Mark David Hawthorne
- Date of birth: 31 October 1973 (age 53)
- Place of birth: Glasgow, Scotland
- Position: Midfielder

Youth career
- –1992: Crystal Palace

Senior career*
Years	Team	Apps	(Gls)
1992–1994	Crystal Palace	0	(0)
1994–1995	Sheffield United	0	(0)
1995	Walsall	0	(0)
1995–1997	Torquay United	58	(2)
1997	Hayes		
1997–2000	Crawley Town	113	(13)
2000	Slough Town		
2000–2001	Crawley Town		
2001–2002	Slough Town		
2002–2004	Carshalton Athletic		
2004–2004	Worthing		
2004–2006	Horsham	49	(1)
2007–2010	Horsham	9	(0)
- * Club domestic league appearances and goals

Mark David Hawthorne (born 31 October 1973) is a Scottish former professional footballer. He was born in Glasgow. He was most recently first team coach at Broadbridge Heath.

Hawthorne began his career as a junior with Crystal Palace, turning professional in June 1992. He moved to Sheffield United on a free transfer in August 1994 after failing break into the first team at Selhurst Park. He played three times in the club's Anglo-Italian cup side, but was released later that season again having failed to make his league debut.

He joined Walsall on non-contract terms before moving to Torquay United in March 1995, making his league debut later that season. He was released in the summer of 1997 by Torquay head coach Kevin Hodges after making 58 league appearances. He joined Hayes, but by the end of September had moved to Crawley Town where he made 113 appearances and scored 13 goals. He moved to Slough Town, but returned to Crawley on 3 November 2000 when the travelling to Slough became too much for him. He was released by Crawley at the end of the 2000–2001 season, and after proving his fitness in a trial period, rejoined Slough Town in August 2001.

Hawthorne left Slough to join Carshalton Athletic in November 2002, but left in June 2004, after playing 34 games, to try to find a club closer to his Horsham home. He joined Worthing for pre-season training and again on trial in September 2004.

In January 2005, Hawthorne signed for Burgess Hill Town, but signed for Horsham later that year and was part of the Horsham side during the 2005–06 season.
