= John Humphrey (footballer) =

English footballer

Personal information
- Date of birth: 31 January 1961 (age 65)
- Place of birth: Paddington, England
- Height: 5 ft 10 in (1.78 m)
- Position: Full back

Senior career*
Years	Team	Apps	(Gls)
1979–1985	Wolverhampton Wanderers	149	(3)
1985–1990	Charlton Athletic	194	(3)
1990–1995	Crystal Palace	160	(2)
1993	→ Reading (loan)	8	(0)
1995–1996	Charlton Athletic	28	(0)
1996–1997	Gillingham	9	(0)
1997	Brighton & Hove Albion	20	(0)
- Chesham United
- Dulwich Hamlet
- * Club domestic league appearances and goals

John Humphrey (born 31 January 1961) is an English former professional footballer who played as a defender from 1979 until 1997.

He notably played for Crystal Palace after he was controversially made part of the deal for Charlton being allowed to continue playing at their ground, where he featured in the Premier League. He also played in the Football League for Wolverhampton Wanderers, Charlton Athletic, Reading, Gillingham and Brighton & Hove Albion, before finishing his career in Non-league for Chesham United and Dulwich Hamlet.

== Personal life ==
Humphrey was a pupil at Aylestone High School, Willesden as another product of the Brent pipeline along with others such as Bobby Fisher, Cyril Regis, John Barnes, Ricky Hill, Stuart Pearce, and Raheem Sterling. He is also a magician.

== Honours ==
Charlton Athletic

- Full Members' Cup runner-up: 1986–87

Crystal Palace

- Football League First Division: 1993–94
- Full Members' Cup: 1990–91
