= Stuart Massey =

English footballer and manager

Personal information
- Full name: Stuart Anthony Massey
- Date of birth: 17 November 1964 (age 61)
- Place of birth: Crawley, England
- Position: Midfielder

Senior career*
Years	Team	Apps	(Gls)
1991–1992	Sutton United		
1992–1994	Crystal Palace	2	(0)
1994–1998	Oxford United	104	(8)
- Whyteleafe
- Carshalton Athletic
- Walton & Hersham
- Sutton United
- Chipstead
- * Club domestic league appearances and goals

Stuart Massey (born 17 November 1964) is an English former footballer who played as a midfielder.

He has worked as a manager, for the clubs Chipstead (player-manager), Sutton United (caretaker), and Whyteleafe.

He began his career at non-league level in the early 1980s before signing for FA Premier League founder members Crystal Palace at the start of the 1992–93 season, but played only in one game that season in which the club was relegated.

He played twice for Crystal Palace during their 1993–94 promotion campaign in Football League Division One before signing for Oxford United. He was more active at the Manor Ground, making more than 100 league appearances and scoring eight goals before being given a free transfer, in May 1998, following a knee injury. He never played professional football again. However, during his time with Oxford he did help them win promotion from Division Two as runners-up in 1996.
