= Dean Gordon =

English footballer (born 1973)

Personal information
- Full name: Dean Dwight Gordon
- Date of birth: 10 February 1973 (age 53)
- Place of birth: Croydon, London, England
- Position: Left-back

Youth career
- Crystal Palace

Senior career*
Years	Team	Apps	(Gls)
1991–1998	Crystal Palace	201	(20)
1998–2002	Middlesbrough	63	(5)
2001	→ Cardiff City (loan)	7	(1)
2002–2004	Coventry City	35	(1)
2004	→ Reading (loan)	3	(0)
2004–2005	Grimsby Town	20	(2)
2005	APOEL Nicosia	8	(0)
2005–2006	Crook Town		
2006	Blackpool	1	(0)
2006	Lewes	2	(0)
2006	Crook Town		
2006	Worksop Town	12	(0)
2006	Albany United		
2006	Auckland City	5	(2)
2006–2007	New Zealand Knights	6	(0)
2007	Lewes	1	(0)
2007	Torquay United	8	(0)
2007	Whitby Town	7	(0)
2008–2009	Ilkeston Town	7	(0)
2008–2009	→ Glapwell (loan)		
2009	Workington		
2009	Thornaby		
Total		386	(31)

International career
1994–1995	England U21	13	(0)
- * Club domestic league appearances and goals

Dean Dwight Gordon (born 10 February 1973) is an English former professional footballer who played as a left-back between 1991 and 2009 in his native England as well as Cyprus and New Zealand.

He notably played Premier League football for Crystal Palace and Middlesbrough, having also had spells as a professional with Cardiff City, Coventry City, Reading, Grimsby Town, APOEL Nicosia, Blackpool, Albany United, New Zealand Knights, Auckland City and Torquay United. Gordon also spent time playing in the English Non-League system with Worksop Town, Crook Town, Lewes, Whitby Town, Ilkeston Town, Glapwell, Workington and Thornaby.

Gordon, who was born in Croydon, South London, is an example of a journeyman footballer having represented 20 different clubs during an 18-year career, but despite this he had only played for two clubs in his first ten years in the game but spent his latter years playing for numerous clubs.

== Club career ==
=== Crystal Palace ===
Gordon began his career as a trainee with Crystal Palace, turning professional in July 1991. He went on to make over 200 appearances for the Eagles and was known to be a strong in the tackle and impressive going forward down the left flank. His speedy forays often resulted in spectacular goals as he let fly from the edge of the box.

=== Middlesbrough ===
Gordon joined fellow Premier League club Middlesbrough for a fee of £900,000 on 6 July 1998. In his first season at the Riverside he played in every league game. In November 2001 Gordon went on loan to Cardiff City, scoring once against Blackpool, and was released by Middlesbrough at the end of that season.

=== Coventry City ===
Gordon joined Coventry City in July 2002 and was a regular in his first season at Highfield Road, scoring once against Ipswich Town. However, he lost his place and joined Reading on loan in March 2004, and eventually went on trial with Hibernian in July 2004.

=== Grimsby Town ===
Gordon signed with Football League Two side Grimsby Town on a free transfer in August 2004, his first club outside of the top two tiers of English football, but despite holding down a regular place in the team he was released in March 2005 by Russell Slade.

=== APOEL Nicosia ===
On 2005 Gordon moved to Cyprus to play for APOEL Nicosia, but he was released from the club a few months later.

=== Later career ===
In November 2005, Gordon joined non-league Crook Town, where he could rebuild his English football career, which had been delayed due problems with gaining international clearance, while being near to his business in Darlington. He subsequently had an unsuccessful trial with Barnsley before joining Blackpool in January 2006, but was released after playing just once. A proposed move to Chester City was blocked as Gordon was not allowed to sign for two clubs inside the transfer window. As a result, he moved to Lewes in February 2006, before the following month rejoining Crook Town. Later that month he joined Worksop Town, where he played until the end of the season.

Gordon then moved to New Zealand and signed for Auckland North Shore team Albany United in June 2006. He subsequently moved to Auckland City in September the same year, scoring twice in five games.

In December 2006, Gordon left City to join A-League team New Zealand Knights in a surprise move, forgoing the chance to play for City against Barcelona in the FIFA Club World Cup in Japan.

He played six times for the Knights in the A-League, before returning to England where he rejoined Lewes in February 2007.

He began training with English club Torquay United and signed for the Gulls on non-contract terms on 16 February 2007. He made his debut the following day in a 1–0 defeat at home to Hartlepool United. He played eight times as Torquay were relegated to the Conference National and was released at the end of the season.

After playing seven games in late 2007 for Whitby Town on a match-to-match basis, he then signed for another Northern Premier League side, Ilkeston Town in August 2008. Gordon also had a short but successful spell at local teesside based club Thornaby.

In March 2009, Gordon signed for Conference North side Workington.

== International career ==
Gordon appeared 13 times for the England Under-21s in the mid-1990s.

== Personal life ==
Following his retirement, Gordon lived in Sunderland and began coaching and teaching for the 'Show Racism The Red Card' group and now goes around schools in the North East to teach them about racism. Dean runs Futsal Sunderland in the city, providing competitions and other Futsal events for all ages.

He is the father of Southampton FC player Nathan Wood-Gordon.

== Honours ==
Crystal Palace

- Football League First Division: 1993–94; play-offs: 1997

Individual

- PFA Team of the Year: 1995–96 First Division
