= Eric Young (footballer, born 1960) =

Wales international footballer

Personal information
- Full name: Eric Young
- Date of birth: 25 March 1960 (age 66)
- Place of birth: Singapore
- Height: 6 ft 2 in (1.88 m)
- Position: Defender

Senior career*
Years	Team	Apps	(Gls)
1978–1979	Southall		
1979–1982	Slough Town	104	(23)
1982–1987	Brighton & Hove Albion	126	(10)
1987–1990	Wimbledon	99	(9)
1990–1995	Crystal Palace	161	(15)
1995–1997	Wolverhampton Wanderers	31	(2)
1997	Crystal Palace	0	(0)
1997–1998	Enfield	4	(0)
1998–2001	Egham Town		
Total		525	(48)

International career
1990–1995	Wales	21	(1)
- * Club domestic league appearances and goals

Eric Young (born 25 March 1960) is a Welsh former professional footballer who played as a defender.

As a player he notably played for Wimbledon and was part of the clubs victorious FA Cup winning team in 1988, he later went on to play in the Premier League with Crystal Palace and has also featured in the Football League for Brighton & Hove Albion and Wolverhampton Wanderers. He began and finished his career in Non-league football with Southall, Slough Town, Enfield and Egham Town.

Born in Singapore, he gained 21 international caps for Wales. He was a strong, commanding centre-half, nicknamed "Ninja" due to his ever-present brown headband, which he wore during matches to protect scar tissue on his forehead.

== Club career ==
Young started his career at non-league Southall and then moved to Slough Town where his commanding style was noticed by a number of league clubs; he played for Slough for three seasons. Young was eventually signed by Brighton & Hove Albion in 1982. During the period in non-league football Young continued with his accountancy training. He made his Football League debut in the first match of the 1982–83 season and went on to make 126 league appearances for the club, scoring 10 goals before transferring to Wimbledon for £70,000 on the eve of the 1987–88 season.

He became a fan favourite at Wimbledon and formed a formidable central defensive partnership with Andy Thorn, playing in the club's famous victory over Liverpool in the 1988 FA Cup final. After 99 league appearances and 9 goals for Wimbledon, in 1990 he was sold to Crystal Palace for £850,000 (at the time a huge transfer fee for a 30-year-old). At Palace he continued his consistently reliable form, and the club had already signed Thorn in 1989 which meant the resumption of their defensive partnership that had proved so successful at Wimbledon. Young was a mainstay in the team that finished third in the old first division (now the Premier League) and kept his place in the side until a falling out with manager Alan Smith at the beginning of the 1994–95 season saw him dropped until the final five matches of that campaign.

After 161 league appearances and 15 goals for Palace, he then joined Wolverhampton Wanderers on a free transfer. He spent two seasons at Wolves before completing his professional career, briefly returning to Palace in 1997 without playing a senior game, but then continued to play non-league football for another four seasons whilst also qualifying as a chartered accountant, before finally hanging up his boots at the age of 41 at Egham Town.

== International career ==
As a British citizen who was born abroad – in Singapore – FIFA eligibility rules at the time of Young's first international selection entitled him to represent any of the constituent countries of the United Kingdom at international level. He opted for Wales, despite having no specific family connection to that country.

He made his international début for Wales, aged 30, versus Costa Rica in a friendly game at Ninian Park in 1990, alongside fellow débutantes Gary Speed and Paul Bodin. Despite his comparatively late start, Young won a total of 21 caps for Wales.

== Personal life ==
He is the uncle of footballer Rohan Ince, who is himself a cousin of former England captain Paul Ince.

== Honours ==
Wimbledon

- FA Cup: 1987–88

Crystal Palace

- Football League First Division: 1993–94
- Full Members' Cup: 1990–91

Individual

- PFA Team of the Year: 1993–94 First Division
