= Andy Thorn (footballer) =

English footballer and manager

Personal information
- Full name: Andrew Charles Thorn
- Date of birth: 12 November 1966 (age 59)
- Place of birth: Carshalton, London, England
- Height: 6 ft 0 in (1.83 m)
- Position: Defender

Senior career*
Years	Team	Apps	(Gls)
1984–1988	Wimbledon	107	(2)
1988–1989	Newcastle United	36	(2)
1989–1994	Crystal Palace	128	(3)
1994–1996	Wimbledon	37	(1)
1996	Hearts	2	(0)
1996–1998	Tranmere Rovers	35	(1)
Total		345	(9)

International career
1987–1988	England U21	5	(0)

Managerial career
- 2011: Coventry City (caretaker)
- 2011–2012: Coventry City
- 2014: Kidderminster Harriers
- * Club domestic league appearances and goals

Andrew Charles Thorn (born 12 November 1966) is an English former football manager and professional footballer, most recently working in the game as a scout.

As a player, he was a defender from 1984 until 1998. Whilst with Wimbledon, he was part of the side that achieved a famous victory over Liverpool in the 1988 FA Cup final. He also played in the 1990 FA Cup final for Crystal Palace, although this time ended up on the losing side. He also played for Newcastle United, Hearts and Tranmere Rovers.

== Club career ==
Thorn began a playing career with Wimbledon in 1984, playing as a traditional English centre half in the Crazy Gang, alongside Dennis Wise, Lawrie Sanchez and Vinnie Jones. During his initial period at the club he played 107 league games, scoring twice, and also winning five England U21 caps. One of his league goals for the Dons was their first in the First Division after promotion in 1986, a consolation goal in a 3–1 opening day defeat to Manchester City at Maine Road.

Thorn left Wimbledon in 1988 to play for Newcastle United. Although he stayed at St James' Park for only one year, he was nevertheless a mainstay in the starting line-up during the 1988–89 season, before moving on to Crystal Palace in November 1989, where he is now remembered as a legend.

He was credited with improving a poor defence, helping to secure Palace's status in English football's top division for four successive seasons. He appeared in Palace's first Cup final; the 1990 FA Cup final.

He returned to Wimbledon in 1994, playing 37 league games in two seasons before moving to Scottish Premier League side Heart of Midlothian, where he played a handful of games, and then finally to Tranmere Rovers, before retiring prematurely in 1998 due to a knee injury, aged 31.

== Managerial career ==
Thorn joined Coventry City as chief scout before becoming caretaker-manager alongside Steve Harrison after Aidy Boothroyd's departure. Coventry enjoyed a successful close to the season under his leadership, losing only one game against Middlesbrough. His first game as the official manager of the club was the final home game of the 2010–11 season against Reading.

However, the 2011–12 season saw Coventry relegated to League One following a home defeat by Doncaster Rovers on 21 April 2012. Thorn claimed an inability to buy new players and conflict at boardroom level had been major contributors towards Coventry's relegation. The club agreed to keep Thorn to oversee their promotion campaign back to the Championship for the forthcoming 2012–13 season. However, Thorn was sacked as manager on 26 August 2012 after a 2–2 home draw against Bury in which Coventry lost a two-goal advantage in the second half and were booed off at the end of the game.

On 8 January 2014, Thorn was appointed manager of Kidderminster Harriers. On 5 March, after less than two months in the role, Thorn was sacked.

He later returned to AFC Wimbledon, as a scout.

== Honours ==
Wimbledon

- FA Cup: 1987–88

Crystal Palace

- Full Members' Cup: 1990–91
- FA Cup runner-up: 1989–90
