= List of Crystal Palace F.C. players =

This is a list of notable footballers who have played for Crystal Palace F.C. Generally, this means players that have played 100 or more first-class matches for the club. A number of other players who have played an important role have also been included for their contributions; for example, Attilio Lombardo and Don Rogers.

This page also lists recipients of the Player of the Year and Young Player of the Year, and players who have been named in the PFA Team of the Year, while playing for the club.

Martin Hinselwood 1972 -1977 England and Crystal Palace

== Players ==
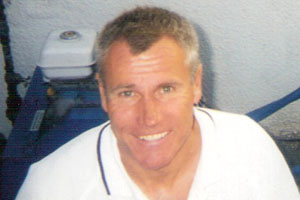
Peter Taylor was the first Palace player to score for England, and the second player to represent England whilst in Division Three.

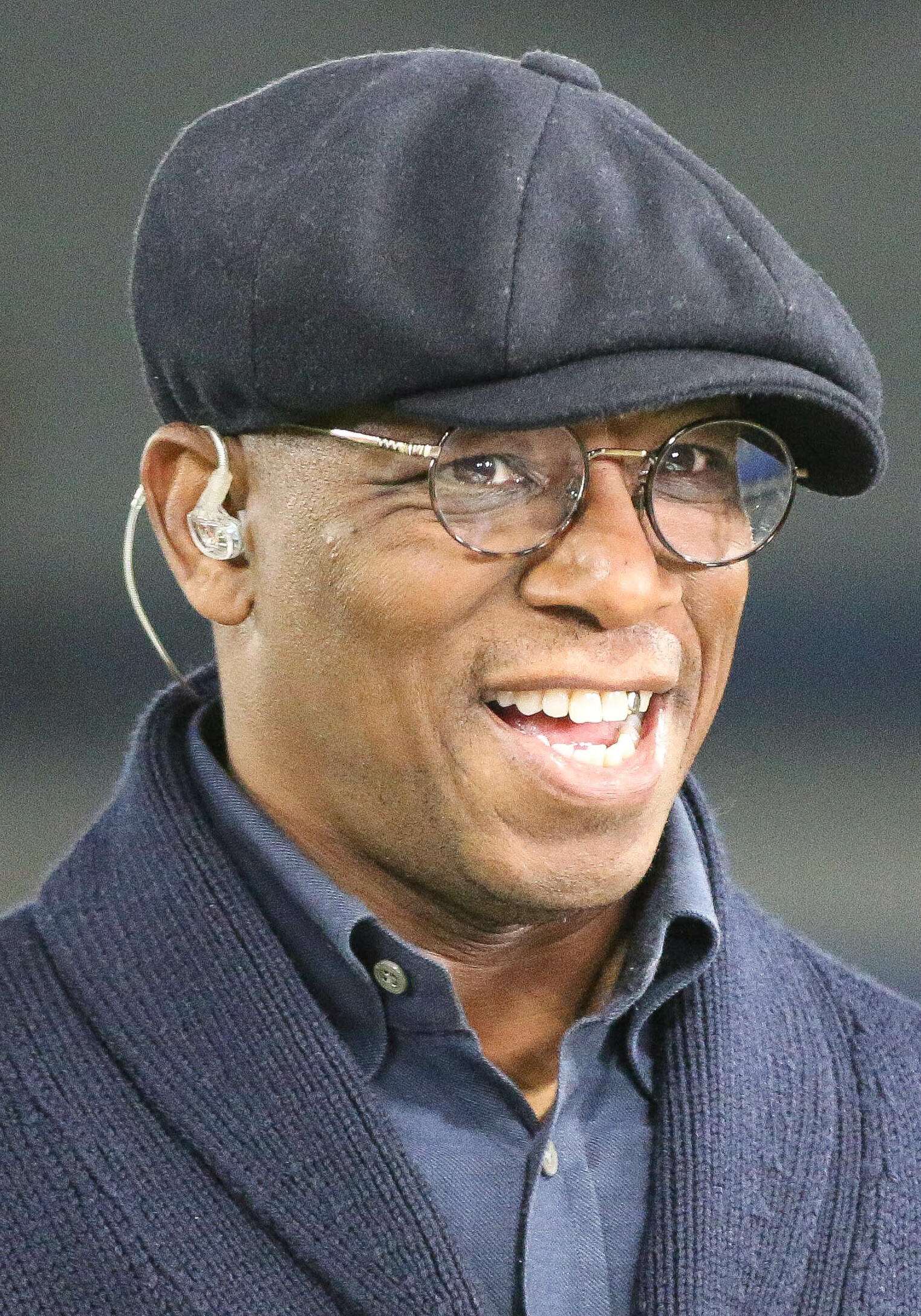
Ian Wright scored 117 goals in 277 appearances, the club's record post-war goalscorer.

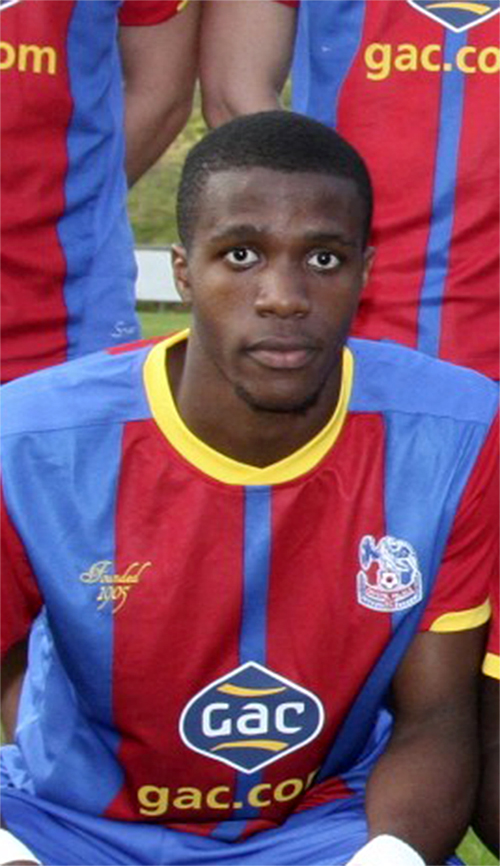
Wilfried Zaha scored 72 goals in 315 appearances, and is the club's record goalscorer in the top flight.

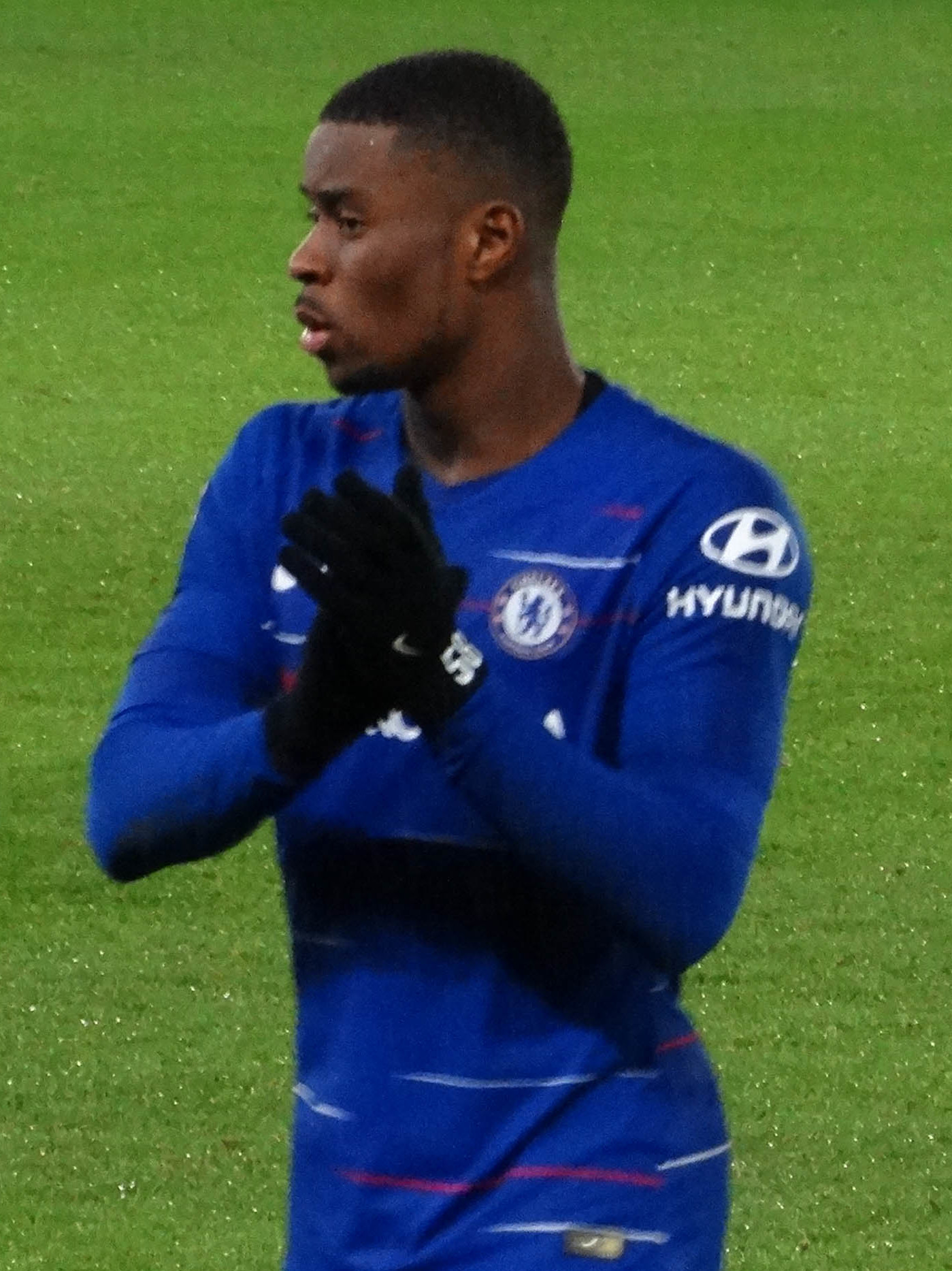
Marc Guéhi won 23 caps for England while at Palace and captained the club to win the FA Cup in 2025.

Players are listed according to the date of their first-team debut. Appearances and goals are for first-team competitive matches only; wartime matches are excluded. Substitute appearances are included. Names in bold are currently active at the club

Positions key
GK	Goalkeeper	RB	Right back	RM	Right midfielder	OR	Outside right
CB	Central back	LB	Left back	LM	Left midfielder	OL	Outside left
DF	Defender	FB	Full back	MF	Midfielder	W	Winger
FW	Forward	HB	Half back	CM	Central midfielder		

Statistics correct as of match played 27 May 2026

Palace captain Spent time as player-manager

Name	Nationality	Position	Palace career	Apps	Goals	Captaincy	Notes
Archie Needham	England	Various	1905–1909	112	26		(Note: Top goal scorer in Crystal Palace's first season 1905/06)
Wilf Innerd	England	CB	1905–1909	133	7	1906–1909	(Note: First player to reach 100 appearances for the club)
George Woodger	England	OL	1905–1910	166	39	1909–1910	
Harry Collyer	England	RB	1906–1915	281	1		(Note: First player to be granted a testimonial match)
Jimmy Bauchop	Scotland	FW	1907–1909	46	25		(Note: First player to join Crystal Palace with international honours)
Billy Davies	Wales	OR	1907–1908, 1910–1915	206	24		(Note: First player to gain international honours while playing for Crystal Palace)
Joshua Johnson	England	GK	1907–1919	293	0		
George Garratt	England	DF	1908–1913	185	8		
Jimmy Williams	Wales	FW	1909–1914	148	56		
Joe Bulcock	England	RB	1909–1914	146	2		
Harry Hanger	England	DF	1909–1915	178	8	1910–1915	
Bob Spottiswood	England	MF	1909–1915	188	2		
James Hughes	England	DF	1909–1920	209	15		
Charles Hewitt	England	FW	1910–1919	155	42		
Edwin Smith	England	FW	1911–1922	192	124		
John Whibley	England	OL	1911–1923	150	27		
Horace Colclough	England	LB	1912–1915	88	0		(Note: First player to play for England while on the books of Crystal Palace)
Ben Bateman	England	OR	1913–1924	180	11		
John Conner	Scotland	FW	1919–1923	104	57		(Note: Top goal scorer in Division Three in the 1920–21 season.)
Jack Alderson	England	GK	1919–1924	205	0		
Jack Little	England	DF	1919–1926	261	0		
Bill Hand	England	FW	1920–1925	109	16		
Robert McCracken	Ireland	DF	1920–1926	190	2		
Albert Harry	England	MF	1921–1934	440	55		
Bob Greener	England	DF	1921–1932	317	6		
George Whitworth	England	FW	1922–1925	118	50		
Cecil Blakemore	England	FW	1922–1927	141	56		
Charles Cross	England	DF	1922–1928	237	0		
Jimmy Hamilton	England	MF	1922–1931	196	5		
Billy Callender	England	GK	1923–1932	224	0		
George Clarke	England	OL	1925–1933	299	105		
Percy Cherrett	England	FW	1925–1927	75	65		
Bill Turner	England	MF	1925–1936	302	37		
Stan Charlton	England	RB	1928–1932	136	7	1928–1930	
Hubert Butler	England	FW	1928–1932	124	39		
Tom Crilly	England	LB	1928–1933	126	1		
Jimmy Wilde	England	DF	1928–1938	293	6	1930–1936	
Peter Simpson	Scotland	FW	1929–1935	195	165		(Note: Top all time goalscorer for Crystal Palace)
Frank Manders	England	FW	1931–1935	103	33		
Ossie Parry	Wales	DF	1931–1936	150	0		
Ronnie Dunn	England	GK	1931–1937	175	0		
Albert Dawes	England	FW	1933–1939	156	92		
Bob Bigg	England	OL	1934–1939	114	41		
Ted Owens	England	DF	1934–1945	172	0		
Nick Collins	England	DF	1934–1946	151	7		
Jack Blackman	England	FW	1935–1946	107	55		(Note: Not including wartime appearances)
Fred Dawes	England	DF	1935–1950	237	2	1936–1937	(Note: Not including wartime appearances)
George Walker	Scotland	CB	1936–1939	111	1	1938–1939	
Jack Lewis	England	MF	1938–1949	126	6		
Geoff Chilvers	England	DF	1942–1954	123	1		
Dick Graham	England	GK	1945–1951	161	0		
Fred Kurz	England	FW	1946–1951	151	48		
Ron George	England	DF	1947–1954	125	2		
Harry Briggs	England	DF	1947–1955	153	4		
Ted Broughton	England	FW	1948–1954	100	6		
Wally Hanlon	Scotland	MF	1949–1955	129	9		
Roy Bailey	England	GK	1949–1956	119	0		
Jack Edwards	Wales	RB	1949–1959	239	0	1956–1959	
Harry McDonald	England	LB	1950–1955	146	1		
Peter Berry	England	OR	1951–1958	161	27		
Albert "Cam" Burgess	England	FW	1951–1953	50	40		
Bob Thomas	England	FW	1952–1955	102	33		
Cecil Andrews	England	MF	1952–1956	105	11		
Len Choules	England	DF	1952–1962	280	4		
Jimmy Belcher	England	MF	1954–1958	138	22		
Roy Greenwood	England	DF	1954–1959	116	0		
Mike Deakin	England	FW	1954–1960	151	63		
Bernard Harrison	England	MF	1955–1959	100	12		
Alf Noakes	England	LB	1955–1962	209	14		
Terry Long	England	DF	1955–1969	480	16		
Johnny Byrne	England	FW	1956–1962	220	95		
Vic Rouse	Wales	GK	1956–1963	257	0		
Roy Summersby	England	FW	1958–1963	190	60		
Johnny McNichol	Scotland	Various	1958–1963	205	15	1958–1963	
Bert Howe	England	DF	1958–1967	212	1		
George Petchey	England	MF/DF	1960–1965	153	12		
Bill Glazier	England	GK	1961–1964	113	0		
Ronnie Allen	England	FW/MF	1961–1965	109	37	1963–1964	
Brian Wood	England	DF	1961–1966	152	4		
Alan Stephenson	England	CB	1961–1968	185	13	1966	
Cliff Holton	England	FW	1962–1965	112	49		
Peter Burridge	England	FW	1962–1965	124	50		
John Sewell	England	RB	1963–1971	258	9	1967–1971	
Bobby Kellard	England	MF	1963–1966, 1971–1973	137	10	1971–1973	
David Payne	England	MF/DF	1964–1973	318	12		
John Jackson	England	GK	1964–1974	388	0		
Jack Bannister	England	DF	1965–1969	129	7		
John McCormick	Scotland	CB	1965–1973	194	6		
Steve Kember	England	MF	1965–1971, 1978–1980	295	38	1971	
Cliff Jackson	England	FW	1966–1970	120	30		
Bobby Woodruff	England	MF	1966–1970	139	48		
Tony Taylor	Scotland	LB	1968–1974	195	8		
Mel Blyth	England	CB	1968–1978	254	12		
Gerry Queen	Scotland	FW	1969–1972	127	30		
Peter Wall	England	DF	1970–1977	208	3		
Paul Hammond	England	GK	1971–1977	142	0		
Jim Cannon	Scotland	DF	1972–1988	663	34	1977–1988	(Note: Most all time appearances for Crystal Palace)
Don Rogers	England	MF	1972–1975	78	30		
Alan Whittle	England	FW/MF	1972–1976	122	24		
Peter Taylor	England	MF	1973–1976	142	39		
Derek Jeffries	England	DF/MF	1973–1977	122	1		
Dave Swindlehurst	England	FW	1973–1980	276	81		
Roy Barry	Scotland	DF	1973–1975	45	1	1973–1975	
Nick Chatterton	England	MF	1973–1979	181	36		
Paul Hinshelwood	England	RB	1974–1983	319	29		
Ian Evans	Wales	CB	1974–1979	163	16	1975–1977	
Phil Holder	England	MF	1975–1979	112	6		
Kenny Sansom	England	LB	1975–1980	197	4		
Ian Walsh	Wales	FW	1975–1982	133	27		
Jerry Murphy	Republic of Ireland	MF	1976–1985	268	25		
Vince Hilaire	England	MF	1976–1984	293	36		
Peter Nicholas	Wales	DF/MF	1976–1981, 1983–1985	174	14		
Billy Gilbert	England	DF	1977–1984	273	4		
John Burridge	England	GK	1978–1980	102	0		
Paul Barron	England	GK	1980–1983	108	0		
Gavin Nebbeling	South Africa	CB	1981–1989	165	8		
David Giles	Wales	MF	1982–1984	100	6		
Henry Hughton	Republic of Ireland	MF/DF	1982–1986	130	6		
Gary Locke	England	DF	1982–1986	100	1		
George Wood	Scotland	GK	1983–1988	218	0		
Gary Stebbing	England	MF	1983–1988	116	3		
Phil Barber	England	MF	1983–1991	288	41		
Alan Irvine	Scotland	MF	1984–1987	125	14		
Andy Gray	England	MF	1984–1987, 1989–1992	242	51		
Tony Finnigan	England	MF	1985–1988	116	10		
Ian Wright	England	FW	1985–1991	277	117		(Note: Top post-wartime Crystal Palace goalscorer)
John Salako	England	MF	1986–1995	273	33		
Richard Shaw	England	DF	1986–1995	207	3		
Mark Bright	England	FW	1986–1992	286	114		
Alan Pardew	England	MF	1987–1991	170	12		
Geoff Thomas	England	MF	1987–1993	249	35	1989–1993	(Note: Captained Crystal Palace's first FA Cup Final side)
John Pemberton	England	RB	1988–1990	105	2		
Eddie McGoldrick	Republic of Ireland	RW	1988–1993	189	16		
Gareth Southgate	England	CB/CM	1989–1995	152	15	1993–1995	
Nigel Martyn	England	GK	1989–1996	349	0		(Note: First goalkeeper to attract a million-pound transfer fee in English football)
Andy Thorn	England	DF	1989–1994	128	3		
Simon Rodger	England	MF	1990–2002	328	11		
Eric Young	England	DF	1990–1995	161	15		
Chris Coleman	Wales	DF	1991–1995	154	13		
Chris Armstrong	England	FW	1992–1995	136	58		
George Ndah	England	FW	1992–1997	101	11		
Bruce Dyer	England	FW	1994–1998	165	44		
Dougie Freedman	Scotland	FW	1995–1997, 2000–2008	368	108		
David Hopkin	Scotland	MF	1995–1997, 2001–2002	112	25		
Marc Edworthy	England	RB	1995–1998	151	1		
Andy Roberts	England	MF	1995–1998	131	4	1995–1997	
Steven Thomson	Scotland	MF	1995–2000	122	4		
Neil Shipperley	England	FW	1996–1998, 2003–2005	117	31	2003–2004	
Andy Linighan	England	DF	1997–2000	128	6	1997–2000	
Attilio Lombardo	Italy	RM	1997–1999	48	10		(Note: Palace player–manager)
Clinton Morrison	Republic of Ireland	FW	1997–2002, 2005–2008	312	112		
Fan Zhiyi	China	CB	1998–2001	102	6		
Hayden Mullins	England	CM	1998–2003	257	20	2002–2003	
Dean Austin	England	DF	1998–2002	167	6	2001–2002	
Neil Ruddock	England	CB	2000–2001	26	3	2000–2001	
Tommy Black	England	LM	2000–2007	153	17		
Aki Riihilahti	Finland	CM	2001–2006	160	14		
Tony Popovic	Australia	CB	2001–2006	144	8	2004–2006	
Wayne Routledge	England	RM	2001–2005	123	10		
Danny Granville	England	LB	2001–2007	138	10		
Andy Johnson	England	FW	2002–2006, 2014–2015	161	85		
Gary Borrowdale	England	LB	2002–2007	114	0		
Danny Butterfield	England	RB	2002–2010	269	7		
Shaun Derry	England	CM	2002–2005, 2007–2010	226	6	2008–2010	
Michael Hughes	Northern Ireland	CM	2003–2007	141	10	2004–2005	
Ben Watson	England	CM	2003–2009	189	20		
Tom Soares	England	CM	2003–2008	162	12		
Mark Hudson	England	CB	2003–2008	136	7	2007–2008	
Gábor Király	Hungary	GK	2004–2007	111	0		
Julián Speroni	Argentina	GK	2004–2019	405	0		
Fitz Hall	England	CB	2004–2006	75	3	2005–2006	
Emmerson Boyce	Barbados	RB	2004–2006	77	2		
Leon Cort	Guyana	CB	2006–2008	50	7		
Carl Fletcher	Wales	CM	2006–2009	74	4	2006–2007	
Matthew Lawrence	England	DF	2006–2010	135	1		
Clint Hill	England	DF	2007–2010	127	6		
Sean Scannell	Republic of Ireland	W/FW	2007–2012	141	13		
Neil Danns	England	CM	2008–2011	114	20		
Paddy McCarthy	Republic of Ireland	CB	2008–2016	144	6	2010–2012	
Darren Ambrose	England	MF	2009–2012	124	37		
**Nathaniel Clyne**	England	RB	2008–2012, 2020–	252	1		
Wilfried Zaha	Ivory Coast	FW	2010–2013, 2014–2023	458	90		
Jonathan Parr	Norway	LB	2011–2014	101	2		
Kagisho Dikgacoi	South Africa	CM	2011–2014	114	8		
Dean Moxey	England	LB	2011–2014	103	1		
Glenn Murray	England	FW	2011–2015	125	47		
Mile Jedinak	Australia	CM	2011–2016	178	10	2012–2016	
Jonny Williams	Wales	MF	2011–2019	70	1		
Yannick Bolasie	DR Congo	FW	2012–2016	144	13		
Joel Ward	England	FB	2012–2025	363	6	2023–2024	
Damien Delaney	Republic of Ireland	CB	2012–2018	193	7		
Jason Puncheon	England	MF	2013–2019	168	16	2017–2018	
Scott Dann	England	CB	2014–2021	181	16	2016–2017	
James McArthur	Scotland	MF	2014–2023	253	19		
Martin Kelly	England	DF	2014–2022	148	1		
Wayne Hennessey	Wales	GK	2014–2021	132	0		
Yohan Cabaye	France	CM	2015–2018	106	11		(Note: First player to cost Crystal Palace £10 million or more)
Christian Benteke	Belgium	FW	2016–2022	177	37		(Note: First player to cost Crystal Palace £20 million or more)
Andros Townsend	England	RM	2016–2021	185	16		
James Tomkins	England	CB	2016–2024	136	10		
Luka Milivojević	Serbia	CM	2017–2023	198	29	2018–2023	
Patrick van Aanholt	Netherlands	LB	2017–2021	134	14		
Jeffrey Schlupp	Ghana	DF/MF	2017–2025	247	19		
Aaron Wan-Bissaka	England	RB	2018–2019	46	0		
Jordan Ayew	Ghana	FW	2018–2024	212	23		
Cheikhou Kouyate	Senegal	MF/CB	2018–2022	142	3		
Vicente Guaita	Spain	GK	2018–2023	154	0		
Eberechi Eze	England	MF	2020–2025	169	40		(Note: Played in 2025 FA Cup final winning squad)
**Tyrick Mitchell**	England	LB	2020–	244	6		(Note: Played in 2026 Conference League final winning squad)
**Jean-Philippe Mateta**	France	FW	2021–	202	62		
Michael Olise	France	FW	2021–2024	90	16		
Marc Guéhi	England	DF	2021–2026	186	11	2024–2026	
Joachim Andersen	Denmark	DF	2021–2024	112	3		
Conor Gallagher	England	CM	2021–2022	39	8		
**Will Hughes**	England	CM	2021–	172	2		
Odsonne Édouard	France	FW	2021–2025	103	21		
**Cheick Doucouré**	Mali	CM	2022–	60	0		
**Chris Richards**	United States	CB	2022–	122	4		
**Jefferson Lerma**	Colombia	CB	2023–	121	1		
**Dean Henderson**	England	GK	2023–	116	0	2026–	
**Daniel Muñoz**	Colombia	CB	2024–	108	11		
**Adam Wharton**	England	CM	2024–	96	1		
**Chadi Riad**	Morocco	CB	2024–	15	0		
**Daichi Kamada**	Japan	MF	2024–	89	3		
**Ismaïla Sarr**	Senegal	FW	2024–	92	33		
**Maxence Lacroix**	France	CB	2024–	98	4		
**Eddie Nketiah**	England	FW	2024–	56	11		
**Yeremy Pino**	Spain	FW	2025–	51	5		
**Jaydee Canvot**	France	CB	2025–	36	0		
**Evann Guessand**	Ivory Coast	ST	2026–	14	2		
**Jorgen Strand Larsen**	Norway	ST	2026–	22	4		

== Player of the Year ==
Year	Winner
1972	(Scotland) John McCormick
1973	(Scotland) Tony Taylor
1974	(England) Peter Taylor
1975	(England) Derek Jeffries
1976	(England) Peter Taylor
1977	(England) Kenny Sansom
1978	(Scotland) Jim Cannon
1979	(England) Kenny Sansom
1980	(England) Paul Hinshelwood
1981	(England) Paul Hinshelwood
1982	(England) Paul Barron

Year	Winner
1983	(Republic of Ireland) Jerry Murphy
1984	(England) Billy Gilbert
1985	(Scotland) Jim Cannon
1986	(Scotland) George Wood
1987	(Scotland) Jim Cannon
1988	(England) Geoff Thomas
1989	(England) Ian Wright
1990	(England) Mark Bright
1991	(England) Geoff Thomas
1992	(Republic of Ireland) Eddie McGoldrick
1993	(England) Andy Thorn

Year	Winner
1994	(Wales) Chris Coleman
1995	(England) Richard Shaw
1996	(England) Andy Roberts
1997	(Scotland) David Hopkin
1998	(England) Marc Edworthy
1999	(England) Hayden Mullins
2000	(England) Andy Linighan
2001	(China) Fan Zhiyi
2002	(Scotland) Dougie Freedman
2003	(England) Hayden Mullins
2004	(England) Andrew Johnson

Year	Winner
2005	(England) Andrew Johnson
2006	(Barbados) Emmerson Boyce
2007	(Guyana) Leon Cort
2008	(Argentina) Julián Speroni
2009	(Argentina) Julián Speroni
2010	(Argentina) Julián Speroni
2011	(England) Nathaniel Clyne
2012	(Norway) Jonathan Parr
2013	(Australia) Mile Jedinak
2014	(Argentina) Julián Speroni
2015	(England) Scott Dann

Year	Winner
2016	(Ivory Coast) Wilfried Zaha
2017	(Ivory Coast) Wilfried Zaha
2018	(Ivory Coast) Wilfried Zaha
2019	(England) Aaron Wan-Bissaka
2020	(Ghana) Jordan Ayew
2021	(Spain) Vicente Guaita
2022	(England) Conor Gallagher
2023	(Mali) Cheick Doucouré
2024	(France) Jean-Philippe Mateta
2025	(Colombia) Daniel Muñoz

== Young Player of the Year ==
- (England) Gary Stebbing – 1983
- (England) Gary Stebbing – 1984
- (England) Dave Lindsay – 1985
- (England) Richard Shaw – 1986
- (England) John Salako – 1987
- (England) John Salako – 1988
- (England) David Stevens – 1989
- (England) Simon Osborn – 1990
- (England) Dean Gordon – 1991
- (Scotland) Mark Hawthorne – 1992
- (Nigeria) George Ndah – 1993
- (Republic of Ireland) Brian Launders – 1994
- No award from 1995–2001
- (England) Julian Gray – 2002
- (England) Wayne Routledge – 2003
- (England) Wayne Routledge – 2004
- (England) Tom Soares – 2005
- (England) Ben Watson – 2006
- (England) Gary Borrowdale – 2007
- (Republic of Ireland) Sean Scannell – 2008
- (England) Nathaniel Clyne – 2009
- (England) Nathaniel Clyne – 2010
- (Ivory Coast) Wilfried Zaha – 2011
- (Ivory Coast) Wilfried Zaha – 2012
- (Wales) Jon Williams – 2013
- (England) Joel Ward – 2014
- No award from 2015-2021
- (England) Tyrick Mitchell - 2022
- (France) Michael Olise - 2023
- No award in 2024

== PFA Team of the Year ==
The following have been included in the PFA Team of the Year while playing for Crystal Palace:

- (England) Derek Jeffries – Third Division 1975 (Third Tier)
- (England) Peter Taylor – Third Division 1975 (Third Tier)
- (Wales) Ian Evans – Third Division 1976 (Third Tier)
- (England) Derek Jeffries – Third Division 1976 (Third Tier)
- (England) Peter Taylor – Third Division 1976 (Third Tier)
- (Wales) Ian Evans – Third Division 1977 (Third Tier)
- (England) Kenny Sansom – Third Division 1977 (Third Tier)
- (England) Kenny Sansom – Second Division 1978 (Second Tier)
- (England) Kenny Sansom – Second Division 1979 (Second Tier)
- (England) Kenny Sansom – First Division 1980 (First Tier)
- (England) Mark Bright – Second Division 1988 (Second Tier)
- (England) Ian Wright – Second Division 1989 (Second Tier)
- (England) Nigel Martyn – First Division 1994 (Second Tier)
- (England) Dean Gordon – First Division 1996 (Second Tier)
- (Scotland) Dougie Freedman – First Division 2002 (Second Tier)
- (England) Andrew Johnson – First Division 2004 (Second Tier)
- (England) Andrew Johnson – Premier League 2005 (First Tier)
- (England) Nathaniel Clyne – Championship 2012 (Second Tier)
- (England) Glenn Murray – Championship 2013 (Second Tier)
- (England) Wilfried Zaha – Championship 2013 (Second Tier)
- (Democratic Republic of the Congo) Yannick Bolasie – Championship 2013 (Second Tier)
