= Jimmy Wilde (disambiguation) =

Jimmy Wilde (1892–1969) was a Welsh professional boxer and world boxing champion.

Jimmy Wilde may also refer to:

- Jimmy Wilde (footballer, fl. 1914–23), English footballer for Burnley, Reading and Accrington Stanley
- Jimmy Wilde (footballer, born 1904) (1904–1976), English footballer for Crystal Palace
- Jimmy Wilde, one of the many pen names of John Creasey (1908–1973), English crime and science fiction writer

== See also ==
- James Wilde (disambiguation)
