= Friar Lane & Epworth F.C. =

Association football club in England

Coordinates: 52°36′26.53″N 1°07′51.75″W

Friar Lane & Epworth
- Full name: Friar Lane & Epworth Football Club
- Nickname: The Lane
- Founded: 2004
- Ground: Knighton Lane East, Aylestone
- Chairman: Clive Gibbons
- League: Leicestershire Senior League Premier Division
- 2024–25: Leicestershire Senior League Premier Division, 14th of 15
Home colours	Away colours

Friar Lane & Epworth F.C. is a football club based in Aylestone, which is a suburb of Leicester, Leicestershire, England. They currently play in the Leicestershire Senior League Premier Division.

In 2004, Friar Lane Old Boys and Epworth merged to form the present club. They have reached the second round of the FA Vase twice in their short history. They reached the first qualifying round of the FA Cup in season 2008–09.

== History ==
Friar Lane Old Boys joined the Leicestershire Senior League in 1969 and were champions of Division Two in their first season. During the 1970s they dominated the top division, winning the title seven times, including five titles in a row between 1973–74 and 1977–78, but never stepping up to a higher level. They also reached the semi-finals of the FA Vase in 1974–75 and again in 1975–76. After 1978 their fortunes took a dip but they still finished second in the league three times during the 1990s, missing out on the title on goal difference each time.

Epworth joined the Leicestershire Senior League in 2002 and were Division One champions in their first season. In 2004 the two clubs merged, and the new club was immediately successful, winning the league in 2006 and finally stepping up to the Midland Football Alliance.

At the start of the 2011–12 season, Friar Lane & Epworth resigned from the Midland Alliance. Chairman Clive Gibbons told the Midland Alliance that the club would "struggle to have enough playing personnel to complete the season".

The club took the place of their reserve team in Division One of the Leicestershire Senior League for the 2011–12 season.

== Ground ==
The merged club inherited Friar Lane's Knighton Lane East ground, which was opened on the site of former council allotments in 1971. The ground has just over 100 covered seats, as well as a tea and snack bar and clubhouse.

== Honours ==
- Leicestershire Senior League
  - Division One champions: 2005–06
  - Division One runners-up (promoted): 2012–13.

== Records ==
=== Friar Lane Old Boys FC ===
- Best FA Cup performance: First qualifying round, 1976–77, 1977–78, 1978–79, 1979–80, 1982–83, 1984–85 (replay), 1987–88 (replay)
- Best FA Vase performance: Semi-finals, 1974–75, 1975–76
- Best FA Amateur Cup performance: Third round, 1973–74

=== Friar Lane & Epworth FC ===
- Best FA Cup performance: First qualifying round, 2008–09 (replay)
- Best FA Vase performance: Third round, 2007–08
