= Whibley =

Whibley is a surname. Notable people with the surname include:

- Charles Whibley (1859–1930), English literary journalist and author
- Dale Whibley (born 1997), Canadian actor
- Deryck Whibley (born 1980), Canadian musician and producer
- Ethel Whibley (1861–1920), secretary and model to the artist Whistler
- Fred Whibley (1855–1919), English island trader
- John Whibley (1891–1972), English footballer
- Leonard Whibley (1864–1941), English classical scholar

== See also ==
- John Whibley Gallery, art gallery in London, England
- Webbley
- Webley (disambiguation)
- Weebly
- Wibele
