= James Wild =

James Wild may refer to:

- James Wild (politician) (born 1977), British Conservative Party politician
- James Wild (rugby league), rugby league player for Wakefield Trinity
- James William Wild (1814–1892), British architect

== See also ==
- James Wilde (disambiguation)
