= 1973–74 FA Amateur Cup =

The 1973–74 FA Amateur Cup was the 71st and last staging of England's principal cup tournament for amateur teams, the FA Amateur Cup. Bishop's Stortford won the competition for the first time, beating Ilford 4–1 in the final at Wembley.

Matches were scheduled to be played at the stadium of the team named first on the date specified for each round, which was always a Saturday. Some matches, however, might be rescheduled for other days if there were clashes with games for other competitions or the weather was inclement. If scores were level after 90 minutes had been played, a replay would take place at the stadium of the second-named team later the same week. If the replayed match was drawn further replays would be held until a winner was determined. If scores were level after 90 minutes had been played in a replay, a 30-minute period of extra time would be played.

== Calendar ==
Round	Date
First round proper	Saturday 5 January 1974
Second round	Saturday 26 January 1974
Third round	Saturday 9 February 1974
Fourth round	Saturday 2 March 1974
Semi-finals	Saturday 23 March 1974
Final	Saturday 20 April 1974

== First round proper ==
The matches were scheduled to be played on Saturday, 5 January 1974, with four ties postponed to the next Saturday. For the first time in the competition's history, matches could be played on Sunday, and three clubs applied for a permission. There were seven replayed ties, of which one needed a second replay and another a third.

Tie no	Home team	Score	Away team	Date
1	Aveley	5–0	Alton Town	5 January 1974
2	Bishop Auckland	0–3	Shildon	5 January 1974
3	Blyth Spartans	3–0	Sutton Coldfield	5 January 1974
4	Boreham Wood	1–1	Hitchin Town	5 January 1974
replay	Hitchin Town	4–2	Boreham Wood	12 January 1974
5	Cadbury Heath	1–3	Tilbury	5 January 1974
6	Croydon Amateurs	0–1	Leyton	5 January 1974
7	Dagenham	1–3	Walton & Hersham	5 January 1974
8	Dulwich Hamlet	3–0	Newquay	5 January 1974
9	Fareham Town	1–1	Cheshunt	5 January 1974
replay	Cheshunt	1–1	Fareham Town	12 January 1974
replay	Fareham Town	0–2	Cheshunt	19 January 1974
10	Faversham	1–6	Barking	5 January 1974
11	Hampton	2–4	Leytonstone	5 January 1974
12	Hertford Town	2–0	Finchley	5 January 1974
13	Kingstonian	0–0	Ilford	5 January 1974
replay	Ilford	2–1	Kingstonian	5 January 1974
14	Leatherhead	4–0	Enfield	5 January 1974
15	Leeds & Carnegie College	4–0	Prestwich Heys	5 January 1974
16	Loughborough Colleges	2–2	Friar Lane Old Boys	5 January 1974
replay	Friar Lane Old Boys	1–0	Loughborough Colleges	12 January 1974
17	Marine	1–2	Ashington	5 January 1974
18	Middlewich Athletic	4–0	Oldbury United	5 January 1974
19	Ormskirk	1–2	Evenwood Town	5 January 1974
20	Oxford City	1–1	Slough Town	5 January 1974
replay	Slough Town	1–0	Oxford City	12 January 1974
21	St. Albans City	1–1	Brockenhurst	5 January 1974
replay	Brockenhurst	1–0	St. Albans City	12 January 1974
22	Southall	2–2	Carshalton Athletic	5 January 1974
replay	Carshalton Athletic	1–2	Southall	12 January 1974
23	Sutton United	3–1	Tooting & Mitcham	5 January 1974
24	Tow Law Town	1–2	Highgate United	5 January 1974
25	Wycombe Wanderers	5–0	Hornchurch	5 January 1974
26	Horsham	2–1	Clacton	12 January 1974
27	Walthamstow Avenue	1–2	Woking	12 January 1974
28	Hendon	0–0	Harwich & Parkeston	12 January 1974
replay	Harwich & Parkeston	1–1	Hendon	19 January 1974
replay	Hendon	2–2	Harwich & Parkeston	26 January 1974
replay	Harwich & Parkeston	2–0	Hendon	30 January 1974
29	North Shields	2–0	Alvechurch	12 January 1974
30	Bishop's Stortford	2–0	Hayes	6 January 1974
31	Spennymoor United	4–0	Emley	6 January 1974
32	Chesham United	3–2	Maidenhead United	6 January 1974

== Second round proper ==
The matches were scheduled to be played on Saturday, 26 January 1974, but one tie was postponed to the next Saturday, and one was played on Sunday. Five replays were necessary (one of which was played on Sunday).

Tie no	Home team	Score	Away team	Date
1	Aveley	0–0	Leyton	26 January 1974
replay	Leyton	0–1	Aveley	2 February 1974
2	Barking	1–3	Sutton United	26 January 1974
3	Bishop's Stortford	2–1	Hitchin Town	26 January 1974
4	Evenwood Town	0–3	Wycombe Wanderers	26 January 1974
5	Friar Lane Old Boys	4–1	Chesham United	26 January 1974
6	Highgate United	1–0	Hertford Town	26 January 1974
7	Horsham	2–2	Woking	26 January 1974
replay	Woking	3–2	Horsham	2 February 1974
8	Ilford	3–0	Brockenhurst	26 January 1974
9	Leeds & Carnegie Colleges	0–2	Dulwich Hamlet	26 January 1974
10	Leytonstone	0–1	Walton & Hersham	26 January 1974
11	Middlewich Athletic	0–9	Leatherhead	26 January 1974
12	Slough Town	1–1	Ashington	26 January 1974
replay	Ashington	1–0	Slough Town	2 February 1974
13	North Shields	2–0	Shildon	26 January 1974
14	Blyth Spartans	2–0	Fareham Town	26 January 1974
15	Southall	1–1	Spennymoor United	26 January 1974
replay	Spennymoor United	4–1	Southall	3 February 1974
16	Tilbury	0–0	Hendon	2 February 1974
replay	Hendon	2–0	Tilbury	9 February 1974

== Third round proper ==
The matches were scheduled to be played on Saturday, 9 February 1974, but four ties were postponed to the next Saturday (including one due to delay in settling a second round tie. Four replays were necessary, as well as one second replay.

Tie no	Home team	Score	Away team	Date
1	Blyth Spartans	2–1	Wycombe Wanderers	9 February 1974
2	Dulwich Hamlet	4–1	Friar Lane Old Boys	9 February 1974
3	Ashington	1–1	North Shields	9 February 1974
replay	North Shields	0–2	Ashington	16 February 1974
4	Spennymoor United	0–2	Sutton United	9 February 1974
5	Hendon	1–1	Leatherhead	16 February 1974
replay	Leatherhead	1–1	Hendon	23 February 1974
replay	Hendon	0–2	Leatherhead	2 March 1974
6	Aveley	1–1	Woking	16 February 1974
replay	Woking	2–0	Aveley	23 February 1974
7	Ilford	2–1	Highgate United	16 February 1974
8	Walton & Hersham	0–0	Bishop's Stortford	16 February 1974
replay	Bishop's Stortford	1–0	Walton & Hersham	23 February 1974

== Fourth round proper ==
The matches were scheduled to be played on Saturday, 2 March 1974, with one tie postponed to the following Saturday, and one replay necessary.

Tie no	Home team	Score	Away team	Date
1	Ashington	2–0	Woking	2 March 1974
2	Bishop's Stortford	3–1	Blyth Spartans	2 March 1974
3	Ilford	1–1	Dulwich Hamlet	2 March 1974
replay	Dulwich Hamlet	0–1	Ilford	2 March 1974
4	Sutton United	0–1	Leatherhead	9 March 1974

== Semi-finals ==
The matches were scheduled to be played on Saturday, 23 March 1974, on neutral venues. There was one replay.

Tie no	Home team	Score	Away team	Date
1	Ashington	0–0	Bishop's Stortford	23 March 1974
replay	Bishop's Stortford	3–0	Ashington	30 March 1974
2	Ilford	1–0	Leatherhead	23 March 1974

== Final ==
20 April 1974
15:00 BST

Bishop's Stortford	4 – 1	Ilford
D. Lawrence; P. Leakey; D. Murphy; M. Smith (pen.)		P. Drabwell

Wembley, London
Attendance: 30,500
Referee: D. Turner (Cannock)
