= Billy Callender =

English footballer

Personal information
- Date of birth: 5 January 1903
- Place of birth: Prudhoe, England
- Date of death: 26 July 1932 (aged 29)
- Place of death: London, England
- Position: Goalkeeper

Youth career
- –1923: Prudhoe Town

Senior career*
Years	Team	Apps	(Gls)
1923–1932	Crystal Palace	202	(0)

International career
1926	The Football League XI		
- * Club domestic league appearances and goals

Billy Callender (5 January 1903 – 26 July 1932) was an English professional footballer who played as a goalkeeper. He made 202 Football League appearances for Crystal Palace between 1923 and 1932.

Callender was born in Prudhoe, Northumberland and was playing in local football with Prudhoe Town when he was signed by Crystal Palace in 1923. Initially, he was understudy to Jack Alderson and made only two appearances in his first two seasons at the club. He became a regular in the 1925–26 season and was ever-present in 1926–27, when he also played for the Football League representative team. Callender continued to be a regular in the Crystal Palace team until the end of the 1931–32 season.

On 26 July 1932, Callender committed suicide at the club ground, following the death of his fiancée from polio. He was found hanged in the team dressing room after training.
