= Webley =

Webley may refer to:

- Webley & Scott or Webley, a British arms manufacturer
  - Webley Revolver
  - Webley Stinger, an air pistol
  - .442 Webley revolver cartridge
  - .455 Webley handgun cartridge
  - .45 Webley, an 11 mm caliber revolver cartridge

== People ==
- Donald Martin Webley (1916–1990), British microbiologist
- Emily Webley-Smith (born 1984), English professional tennis player
- Big George (1957–2011), or George Webley, British musician, composer, bandleader, and broadcaster
- Glenmore Webley (1952-1987), Jamaican politician
- Jason Webley (born 1974), American musician
- Joan Gordon-Webley, Jamaican politician
- Paul Webley (1953–2016), British scholar of economic psychology
- Peter Webley (1942-2023), English cricketer
- Tom Webley (born 1983), English cricketer
- Webley Edwards (1902–1977), World War II news correspondent and Hawaiian radio personality
- Webley John Hauxhurst (1809–1874), pioneer in Oregon Country

=== Fictional ===
- Webley Webster, a character created by Ray Goulding of the Bob and Ray comedy team

== See also ==
- Mars Automatic Pistol, or Webley-Mars
- Webley–Fosbery Automatic Revolver
- Webbley, a historic home in North Carolina, US
- Weebly, a web-hosting service
