= 1975–76 in English football =

Football in England
- Season: 1975–76

Men's football
- First Division: Liverpool
- Second Division: Sunderland
- Third Division: Hereford United
- Fourth Division: Lincoln City
- FA Cup: Southampton
- Anglo-Scottish Cup: Middlesbrough
- League Cup: Manchester City
- Charity Shield: Derby County

The 1975–76 season was the 96th season of competitive football in England.

== Diary of the season ==
16 August 1975: The First Division season begins with reigning champions Derby County held to a 1–1 draw by Sheffield United. Last season's Second Division champions Manchester United win 2–0 away to Wolverhampton Wanderers, while Queens Park Rangers beat Liverpool 2–0.

23 August 1975: Derby County are beaten 5–1 by Queens Park Rangers at the Baseball Ground in their first home League match of the season.

31 August 1975: Manchester United lead the First Division by one point from West Ham United at the end of August.

30 September 1975: Two London clubs, Queens Park Rangers and West Ham United, lead the First Division table at the end of September, a point ahead of Manchester United. Sheffield United are bottom with just three points from ten matches.

30 October 1975: England lose 2–1 to Czechoslovakia in Bratislava in a European Championship qualifier.

31 October 1975: Seven clubs all lie within two points at the top of the First Division, with the table led by Queens Park Rangers, Manchester United and West Ham United. Sheffield United are already five points adrift of Wolverhampton Wanderers at the bottom, while Leicester City are still looking for their first win, having drawn nine of their fourteen games so far.

8 November 1975: Manchester United fall from first place to third after the Red Devils were beaten by Liverpool. The new league leaders are West Ham United, with second-placed Derby level on points with the London club. Elsewhere, braces from Leeds United's Duncan McKenzie and Colin Bell of Manchester City help their clubs beat Newcastle United and Birmingham City respectively.

12 November 1975: Manchester City thrash neighbours United 4–0 in the fourth round of the Football League Cup.

19 November 1975: England draw 1–1 away to Portugal in their last European Championship qualifier, and must now hope that Czechoslovakia fail to beat Cyprus in order to qualify for the quarter-finals.

23 November 1975: Czechoslovakia beat Cyprus 3–0 to confirm England's elimination from the European Championships.

30 November 1975: The month ends with Derby County having recovered from their poor start to top the First Division table. They lead Queens Park Rangers and West Ham United by one point. Sheffield United have been joined by Birmingham City and Burnley in the relegation zone.

20 December 1975: Liverpool avenge their opening day defeat to Queens Park Rangers by beating them 2–0 at Anfield in a top-of-the-table clash.

31 December 1975: The year ends with Liverpool and Manchester United level on points at the top of the table, one point ahead of Leeds United and Derby County. Sheffield United are now eleven points from safety, and Wolverhampton Wanderers and Burnley complete the bottom three. Arsenal are struggling in seventeenth place.

3 January 1976: FA Cup third round day throws up a set of interesting results: table toppers Liverpool eliminate reigning FA Cup winners West Ham, Manchester City hit Hartlepool United for six and two late goals for Isthmian League outfit Tooting & Mitcham United help them force a replay against Swindon Town.

17 January 1976: Stoke City play a league game at Port Vale's Vale Park ground during repair work to the roof of the Butler Street Stand at the Victoria Ground, after it had been blown off during severe winds a fortnight earlier.

24 January 1976: Substitute Roger Davies' goal sees Derby County beat Liverpool in the FA Cup fourth round; the Rams' reward is a tie against Southend United, victors over Cardiff City. Other qualifiers to round five include Division Three club Crystal Palace, who overcame Leeds–currently second in the First Division table–at Elland Road, and Fourth Divisioners Bradford City, responsible for ending the FA Cup campaign of Tooting & Mitcham, the last remaining non-Leaguers. The sole First Division match was a London derby between QPR and West Ham: Alan Taylor scoring the only goal for the Hammers.

31 January 1976: Liverpool thrash West Ham United 4–0 at Upton Park but trail Manchester United by a point at the top of the table. Derby County, Leeds United and Queens Park Rangers also remain in contention.

28 February 1976: Manchester City beat Newcastle United 2–1 in the League Cup final.

29 February 1976: The race for the title remains extremely close, with Liverpool, Queens Park Rangers and Manchester United tied on points at the top, and Derby County just one point behind. Leeds United trail by five points, but have at least two games in hand on each of their rivals. At the bottom, Sheffield United are ten points from safety, and Wolverhampton Wanderers, Burnley and Birmingham City appear to be fighting to avoid the other two relegation places.

6 March 1976: Third Division Crystal Palace reach the FA Cup semi-finals by beating Sunderland 1–0 at Roker Park. Fourth Division giant-killers Bradford City lose 1–0 at home to Southampton, and Derby County beat Newcastle United 4–2.

27 March 1976: Sheffield United are beaten 5–0 by Tottenham Hotspur and are relegated to the Second Division.

31 March 1976: Unbeaten in the League since January, Queens Park Rangers lead the First Division by a point from Manchester United and Derby County with five games remaining. Liverpool are two points behind the leaders, but they and United have a game in hand.

3 April 1976: Manchester United and Southampton reach the FA Cup final after 2–0 victories over Derby County and Crystal Palace respectively.

8 April 1976: Malcolm Macdonald's brace helps Newcastle United beat beleaguered Birmingham City 4–0.

10 April 1976: Derby County's bid to retain their League title is effectively ended when they lose 4–3 to Manchester City. Queens Park Rangers beat Middlesbrough 4–2 and have now taken 23 points from the last 24 available. They are now in control of the championship race, as Manchester United lose 3–0 at Ipswich Town and Liverpool draw 0–0 against Aston Villa.

17 April 1976: Liverpool move back to the top of the First Division after they beat Stoke City 5–3 and Queens Park Rangers suffer a 3–2 defeat to Norwich City.

19 April 1976: Burnley are relegated to the Second Division with one match of the season remaining.

21 April 1976: Manchester United's bid for the double is virtually ended by a 1–0 loss to Stoke City, their first home League defeat of the season.

24 April 1976: Queens Park Rangers end the best League season in the club's history by beating Leeds United 2–0. They are a point ahead of Liverpool, and need the Reds to lose their last match of the season to win the championship.

28 April 1976: Liverpool recover from 2–0 down to beat Club Bruges 3–2 in the first leg of the UEFA Cup final at Anfield.

1 May 1976: Southampton cause a major shock by beating Manchester United 1–0 in the FA Cup final thanks to a second-half goal from Bobby Stokes. They emulate Sunderland's 1973 feat of winning the Cup from the Second Division.

4 May 1976: Liverpool come from a goal down to beat Wolverhampton Wanderers 3–1 and win the League title. They finish a point ahead of Queens Park Rangers and four ahead of Manchester United. The defeat condemns Wolves to relegation alongside Sheffield United and Burnley.

5 May 1976: West Ham United lose 4–2 to Anderlecht in the European Cup Winners' Cup final at the Heysel Stadium in Brussels.

15 May 1976: England lose 2–1 to Scotland at Hampden Park in their last Home Championship match. Kenny Dalglish scores the winning goal when his shot goes between the legs of England goalkeeper Ray Clemence.

19 May 1976: Liverpool claim their second European trophy by drawing 1–1 with Club Bruges to complete a 4–3 aggregate victory in the UEFA Cup final.

28 May 1976: England come from two goals down at half-time to beat Italy 3–2 in New York City in a tournament organised to commemorate the bicentenary of the independence of the USA.

13 June 1976: England beat Finland 4–1 in their first qualifying match for the 1978 World Cup.

== UEFA competitions ==
Liverpool won the UEFA Cup for the second time after a 4–3 aggregate victory over Club Bruges in the final. The 1975 FA Cup winners West Ham United reached the final of the European Cup Winners' Cup, where they lost 4–2 to another Belgian side, Anderlecht. League champions Derby County lost 6–5 on aggregate to Real Madrid in the second round of the European Cup.

Liverpool's route to the UEFA Cup final included victories over Hibernian, Real Sociedad, Slask Wroclaw, Dynamo Dresden and Barcelona. Liverpool won 3-2 on aggregate against Hibernian, 9-1 against real Sociedad, 5-1 against Slask Wroclaw and 2-1 against Dynamo Dresden. In the semi-final, Liverpool defeated Barcelona 2-1 on aggregate, winning the first leg 1-0 at Camp Nou before a 1-1 draw at Anfield.

== FA Cup ==
Southampton pulled off one of the greatest upsets in the history of FA Cup finals when a Bobby Stokes goal gave them victory over Manchester United at Wembley. It was the first major trophy in the club's history. Crystal Palace of the Third Division had an inspired run from the first round through to the semi-finals, beating Leeds United, Chelsea and Sunderland along the way, all of whom were in higher divisions.

== League Cup ==
Manchester City beat Newcastle to claim the League Cup, their first major trophy for six years. Dennis Tueart scored a brilliant overhead kick to win the game.

== Football League ==
=== First Division ===
Liverpool won the First Division title and the UEFA Cup in their second season under the management of Bob Paisley. They finished just one point ahead of Queens Park Rangers, who had emerged as serious title contenders under the management Dave Sexton, who had won silverware with Chelsea a few seasons earlier. Manchester United enjoyed a strong First Division comeback by finishing third. Derby County's defence of the league title finished with a fourth-place finish. Leeds United continued to recover from the departure of Don Revie by moving up to fifth place a year after finishing ninth.

FA Cup holders West Ham United could only manage an 18th-place finish in the league, and were runners-up in the European Cup Winners' Cup.

Sheffield United's terrible season saw them relegated in bottom place after five years back in the First Division. They went down with Burnley and Wolves.

Bertie Mee, 57, retired after ten years as manager of Arsenal. The highlights of his career had been the Inter-Cities Fairs Cup triumph of 1970 and the Double win of 1971, but Arsenal had fallen behind the best in recent seasons and Mee handed over the reins to Terry Neill.

Pos	Team	Pld	W	D	L	GF	GA	GAv	Pts	Qualification or relegation
1	Liverpool (C)	42	23	14	5	66	31	2.129	60	Qualification for the European Cup first round
2	Queens Park Rangers	42	24	11	7	67	33	2.030	59	Qualification for the UEFA Cup first round
3	Manchester United	42	23	10	9	68	42	1.619	56	Qualification for the UEFA Cup first round
4	Derby County	42	21	11	10	75	58	1.293	53	Qualification for the UEFA Cup first round
5	Leeds United	42	21	9	12	65	46	1.413	51	
6	Ipswich Town	42	16	14	12	54	48	1.125	46	
7	Leicester City	42	13	19	10	48	51	0.941	45	
8	Manchester City	42	16	11	15	64	46	1.391	43	Qualification for the UEFA Cup first round
9	Tottenham Hotspur	42	14	15	13	63	63	1.000	43	
10	Norwich City	42	16	10	16	58	58	1.000	42	
11	Everton	42	15	12	15	60	66	0.909	42	
12	Stoke City	42	15	11	16	48	50	0.960	41	
13	Middlesbrough	42	15	10	17	46	45	1.022	40	
14	Coventry City	42	13	14	15	47	57	0.825	40	
15	Newcastle United	42	15	9	18	71	62	1.145	39	
16	Aston Villa	42	11	17	14	51	59	0.864	39	
17	Arsenal	42	13	10	19	47	53	0.887	36	
18	West Ham United	42	13	10	19	48	71	0.676	36	
19	Birmingham City	42	13	7	22	57	75	0.760	33	
20	Wolverhampton Wanderers (R)	42	10	10	22	51	68	0.750	30	Relegation to the Second Division
21	Burnley (R)	42	9	10	23	43	66	0.652	28	Relegation to the Second Division
22	Sheffield United (R)	42	6	10	26	33	82	0.402	22	Relegation to the Second Division

Source: World Football
Rules for classification: 1) Points; 2) Goal average; 3) Goals scored
(C) Champions; (R) Relegated

=== Second Division ===
Three years after their famous FA Cup win, Sunderland finally made it out of the Second Division as champions. Bristol City finished runners-up to end their 65-year exile from the First Division. Johnny Giles enjoyed a dream start to his managerial career by ending West Bromwich Albion's three-year stay in the Second Division. Bolton Wanderers missed out on promotion by a single point under Ian Greaves. Sixth placed Southampton won the first silverware of their history by winning the FA Cup at the expense of Manchester United.

Nottingham Forest finished eighth in Brian Clough's first full season as manager. Chelsea finished a disappointing 11th in their first season outside the top flight for over a decade.

Portsmouth, York City and Oxford United finished the season relegated to the Third Division.

Pos	Team	Pld	W	D	L	GF	GA	GAv	Pts	Qualification or relegation
1	Sunderland (C, P)	42	24	8	10	67	36	1.861	56	Promotion to the First Division
2	Bristol City (P)	42	19	15	8	59	35	1.686	53	Promotion to the First Division
3	West Bromwich Albion (P)	42	20	13	9	50	33	1.515	53	Promotion to the First Division
4	Bolton Wanderers	42	20	12	10	64	38	1.684	52	
5	Notts County	42	19	11	12	60	41	1.463	49	
6	Southampton	42	21	7	14	66	50	1.320	49	Qualification for the Cup Winners' Cup first round (Note: Southampton qualified for the Cup Winners' Cup first round as the 1975–76 FA Cup winners.)
7	Luton Town	42	19	10	13	61	51	1.196	48	
8	Nottingham Forest	42	17	12	13	55	40	1.375	46	
9	Charlton Athletic	42	15	12	15	61	72	0.847	42	
10	Blackpool	42	14	14	14	40	49	0.816	42	
11	Chelsea	42	12	16	14	53	54	0.981	40	
12	Fulham	42	13	14	15	45	47	0.957	40	
13	Orient	42	13	14	15	37	39	0.949	40	
14	Hull City	42	14	11	17	45	49	0.918	39	
15	Blackburn Rovers	42	12	14	16	45	50	0.900	38	
16	Plymouth Argyle	42	13	12	17	48	54	0.889	38	
17	Oldham Athletic	42	13	12	17	57	68	0.838	38	
18	Bristol Rovers	42	11	16	15	38	50	0.760	38	
19	Carlisle United	42	12	13	17	45	59	0.763	37	
20	Oxford United (R)	42	11	11	20	39	59	0.661	33	Relegation to the Third Division
21	York City (R)	42	10	8	24	39	71	0.549	28	Relegation to the Third Division
22	Portsmouth (R)	42	9	7	26	32	61	0.525	25	Relegation to the Third Division

Rules for classification: 1) Points; 2) Goal average; 3) Goals scored
(C) Champions; (P) Promoted; (R) Relegated

=== Third Division ===
Hereford United won the Third Division title and with it promotion to the Second Division in only their fourth season in the Football League. Cardiff City and Millwall went up with them to seal an instant return to the Second Division. Brighton, managed by Brian Clough's former assistant Peter Taylor, missed out on promotion by one place. Crystal Palace, semi-finalists in the FA Cup, missed out on promotion after a late season collapse in form, which was followed by the replacement of Malcolm Allison as manager with Terry Venables.

Halifax, Southend, Colchester and Aldershot were relegated. Narrowly avoiding the drop were Sheffield Wednesday, who during the interwar years had won the League championship and the FA Cup, and which resulted in their lowest League finish ever.

Pos	Team	Pld	W	D	L	GF	GA	GAv	Pts	Qualification or relegation
1	Hereford United (C, P)	46	26	11	9	86	55	1.564	63	Promotion to the Second Division
2	Cardiff City (P)	46	22	13	11	69	48	1.438	57	Cup Winners' Cup preliminary round and promotion to the Second Division
3	Millwall (P)	46	20	16	10	54	43	1.256	56	Promotion to the Second Division
4	Brighton & Hove Albion	46	22	9	15	78	53	1.472	53	
5	Crystal Palace	46	18	17	11	61	46	1.326	53	
6	Wrexham	46	20	12	14	66	55	1.200	52	
7	Walsall	46	18	14	14	74	61	1.213	50	
8	Preston North End	46	19	10	17	62	57	1.088	48	
9	Shrewsbury Town	46	19	10	17	61	59	1.034	48	
10	Peterborough United	46	15	18	13	63	63	1.000	48	
11	Mansfield Town	46	16	15	15	58	52	1.115	47	
12	Port Vale	46	15	16	15	55	54	1.019	46	
13	Bury	46	14	16	16	51	46	1.109	44	
14	Chesterfield	46	17	9	20	69	69	1.000	43	
15	Gillingham	46	12	19	15	58	68	0.853	43	
16	Rotherham United	46	15	12	19	54	65	0.831	42	
17	Chester	46	15	12	19	43	62	0.694	42	
18	Grimsby Town	46	15	10	21	62	74	0.838	40	
19	Swindon Town	46	16	8	22	62	75	0.827	40	
20	Sheffield Wednesday	46	12	16	18	48	59	0.814	40	
21	Aldershot (R)	46	13	13	20	59	75	0.787	39	Relegation to the Fourth Division
22	Colchester United (R)	46	12	14	20	41	65	0.631	38	Relegation to the Fourth Division
23	Southend United (R)	46	12	13	21	65	75	0.867	37	Relegation to the Fourth Division
24	Halifax Town (R)	46	11	13	22	41	61	0.672	35	Relegation to the Fourth Division

Rules for classification: 1) Points; 2) Goal average; 3) Goals scored
(C) Champions; (P) Promoted; (R) Relegated

=== Fourth Division ===
32-year-old Graham Taylor achieved the first success of his managerial career by winning the Fourth Division title for Lincoln City. Their points total of 74 was and remains the record for the Football League during the period when 2 points were awarded for a win. He was linked with several job vacancies in the First and Second Divisions but surprised everyone by taking over at Elton John's Watford, who were still standing in the Fourth Division. Joining Lincoln in the Third Division were Northampton Town, Reading and Tranmere Rovers.

The Football League voted in favour of the bottom four clubs remaining in the Fourth Division, and so there were no departures or arrivals in the league for 1976–77.

Pos	Team	Pld	W	D	L	GF	GA	GAv	Pts	Promotion
1	Lincoln City (C, P)	46	32	10	4	111	39	2.846	74	Promotion to the Third Division
2	Northampton Town (P)	46	29	10	7	87	40	2.175	68	Promotion to the Third Division
3	Reading (P)	46	24	12	10	70	51	1.373	60	Promotion to the Third Division
4	Tranmere Rovers (P)	46	24	10	12	89	55	1.618	58	Promotion to the Third Division
5	Huddersfield Town	46	21	14	11	56	41	1.366	56	
6	Bournemouth	46	20	12	14	57	48	1.188	52	
7	Exeter City	46	18	14	14	56	47	1.191	50	
8	Watford	46	22	6	18	62	62	1.000	50	
9	Torquay United	46	18	14	14	55	63	0.873	50	
10	Doncaster Rovers	46	19	11	16	75	69	1.087	49	
11	Swansea City	46	16	15	15	66	57	1.158	47	
12	Barnsley	46	14	16	16	52	48	1.083	44	
13	Cambridge United	46	14	15	17	58	62	0.935	43	
14	Hartlepool	46	16	10	20	62	78	0.795	42	
15	Rochdale	46	12	18	16	40	54	0.741	42	
16	Crewe Alexandra	46	13	15	18	58	57	1.018	41	
17	Bradford City	46	12	17	17	63	65	0.969	41	
18	Brentford	46	14	13	19	56	60	0.933	41	
19	Scunthorpe United	46	14	10	22	50	59	0.847	38	
20	Darlington	46	14	10	22	48	57	0.842	38	
21	Stockport County	46	13	12	21	43	76	0.566	38	Re-elected
22	Newport County	46	13	9	24	57	90	0.633	35	Re-elected
23	Southport	46	8	10	28	41	77	0.532	26	Re-elected
24	Workington	46	7	7	32	30	87	0.345	21	Re-elected

(C) Champions; (P) Promoted

=== Top goalscorers ===
First Division

- Ted MacDougall (Norwich City) – 23 goals

Second Division

- Derek Hales (Charlton Athletic) – 28 goals

Third Division

- Dixie McNeil (Hereford United) – 35 goals

Fourth Division

- Ronnie Moore (Tranmere Rovers) – 34 goals

== Non-league football ==
Competition	Winners
Isthmian League	Enfield
Northern Premier League	Runcorn
Southern League	Wimbledon
FA Trophy	Scarborough
FA Vase	Billericay Town

== Star players ==
- Tottenham Hotpsur goalkeeper Pat Jennings was credited with the PFA Players' Player of the Year award.
- Liverpool striker Kevin Keegan was voted FWA Footballer of the Year.
- Manchester City winger Peter Barnes added the PFA Young Player of the Year award to his League Cup winners medal.
- Southampton striker Bobby Stokes inspired his side to their first ever major trophy by scoring the winning goal in the FA Cup final against Manchester United.
- Manchester United's young winger Steve Coppell showed immense promise after helping his newly promoted employers reach third place in the league and reach the FA Cup final.
- Arsenal gave a debut to 17-year-old defender David O'Leary who went on to make 30 appearances that season on the way to a club record of 722 in a 17-year career with the club.

== Star managers ==
- Bob Paisley won his first two trophies as Liverpool manager – the League championship and UEFA Cup – and he would pile up many more prizes over the next seven seasons.
- Lawrie McMenemy guided Southampton to their first major trophy, beating favourites Manchester United in the FA Cup final.
- Dave Sexton guided Queens Park Rangers to the club's best finish of second in the league.
- Tommy Docherty built an exciting young side at Manchester United and a year after promotion back to the First Division they finished third in the league and reached the FA Cup final.
- Bob Stokoe led Sunderland into the First Division, three years after they won the FA Cup.
