= 1974–75 FA Vase =

Football Association Vase

Tournament details
- Country: England; Wales

Final positions
- Champions: Hoddesdon Town
- Runners-up: Epsom & Ewell

The 1974–75 FA Vase was the first season of the FA Vase, an annual football competition for teams in the lower reaches of the English football league system.

Hoddesdon Town won the competition, beating Epsom & Ewell in the final.

== Quarter-finals ==
Home team	Score	Away team
Epsom & Ewell	2–0	Addlestone
Hoddesdon Town	2–0	Farnborough Town

Home team	Score	Away team
Lincoln United	0–1	Friar Lane Old Boys
Wingate	1–3	Stamford

== Semi-finals ==
Leg no	Home team (tier)	Score	Away team (tier)	Attendance
1st	Hoddesdon Town	2–0	Friar Lane Old Boys	
2nd	Friar Lane Old Boys	1–1	Hoddesdon Town	

Hoddesdon Town won 3–1 on aggregate.

Leg no	Home team (tier)	Score	Away team (tier)	Attendance
1st	Epsom & Ewell	2–1	Stamford	
2nd	Stamford	0–0	Epsom & Ewell	

Epsom & Ewell won 2–1 on aggregate.

== Final ==
19 April 1975

Hoddesdon Town	2 – 1	Epsom & Ewell
Sedgewick	Report	Wales

Wembley Stadium, London
Attendance: 9,500
