= James Wilde =

James Wilde may refer to:

- James Wilde, 1st Baron Penzance (1816–1899), British judge and gardener
- Jimmy Wilde (1862–1969), Welsh boxer

== See also ==
- Jimmy Wilde (disambiguation)
- James Wild (disambiguation)
- James William Wild
- James Wyld
- James Hart Wyld
