= 1982–83 FA Cup qualifying rounds =

Tournament details
- Country: England; Wales

The FA Cup 1982–83 is the 102nd season of the world's oldest football knockout competition; The Football Association Challenge Cup, or FA Cup for short. The large number of clubs entering the tournament from lower down the English football league system meant that the competition started with a number of preliminary and qualifying rounds. The 28 victorious teams from the fourth round qualifying progressed to the first round proper.

== Preliminary round ==
=== Ties ===
Tie	Home team	Score	Away team
1	A F C Totton	1–0	Marlow
2	Abingdon Town	3–2	Aylesbury United
3	Arnold	0–1	Hinckley Athletic
4	Ashford Town (Kent)	0–2	Sheppey United
5	Ashington	2–2	Chester-Le-Street
6	Barrow	2–0	Crook Town
7	Barry Town	2–0	Haverfordwest County
8	Barton Rovers	2–0	Cheshunt
9	Berkhamsted Town	3–3	Dulwich Hamlet
10	Bootle	3–0	Droylsden
11	Boston	1–3	Bourne Town
12	Bridlington Trinity	3–1	Whitley Bay
13	Bridport	2–3	Wimborne Town
14	Buckingham Town	1–0	Desborough Town
15	Cambridge City	0–0	March Town United
16	Chalfont St Peter	2–1	Rainham Town
17	Chelmsford City	3–1	Finchley
18	Chertsey Town	1–12	Bromley
19	Chorley	5–0	Formby
20	Cinderford Town	3–0	Melksham Town
21	Clitheroe	0–1	Leyland Motors
22	Consett	0–3	Lancaster City
23	Dartford	5–2	Whitehawk
24	Denaby United	1–3	Shepshed Charterhouse
25	Dorking	2–1	Arundel
26	Epsom & Ewell	1–2	Walton & Hersham
27	Faversham Town	2–0	Peacehaven & Telscombe Cliffs
28	Friar Lane Old Boys	1–1	Milton Keynes City
29	Frickley Athletic	5–3	Shildon
30	Gateshead	1–1	Durham City
31	Goole Town	1–0	North Ferriby United
32	Great Yarmouth Town	2–0	Ampthill Town
33	Gresley Rovers	2–4	Worksop Town
34	Harefield United	0–4	Croydon
35	Harrogate Town	3–0	West Auckland Town
36	Haverhill Rovers	3–0	Epping Town
37	Hemel Hempstead	0–0	Hillingdon Borough
38	Herne Bay	0–1	Bognor Regis Town
39	Heybridge Swifts	1–0	Thetford Town
40	Highgate United	3–0	Chipping Norton Town
41	Hounslow	2–5	Cray Wanderers
42	Kidderminster Harriers	0–0	Redditch United
43	Liskeard Athletic	1–0	Ottery St Mary
44	Littlehampton Town	0–3	Newport I O W
45	Long Eaton United	1–0	Wednesfield Social
46	Lye Town	0–2	Bridgnorth Town
47	Lytham	1–2	Southport
48	Malvern Town	0–0	Racing Club Warwick
49	Mangotsfield United	3–2	Newbury Town
50	Matlock Town	0–2	Dudley Town
51	Metropolitan Police	1–2	Sittingbourne
52	Morecambe	2–0	Whitby Town
53	Moreton Town	2–2	Ton Pentre
54	Paulton Rovers	0–2	Bristol Manor Farm
55	Penzance	2–1	Wellington (Somerset)
56	Poole Town	0–0	Basingstoke Town
57	Saffron Walden Town	5–2	Ruislip Manor
58	Salisbury	3–2	Calne Town
59	Skelmersdale United	0–4	Prestwich Heys
60	South Liverpool	1–4	Horwich R M I
61	Spalding United	0–1	Irthlingborough Diamonds
62	St Blazey	3–1	Clandown
63	Stalybridge Celtic	1–1	Burscough
64	Sutton Coldfield Town	4–2	Walsall Borough
65	Sutton Town	2–1	Heanor Town
66	Tooting & Mitcham United	3–1	Molesey
67	Tunbridge Wells	0–3	Canterbury City
68	Waterlooville	1–2	Bracknell Town
69	Wellingborough Town	5–2	Basildon United
70	Winsford United	1–2	Blakenall
71	Witton Albion	2–0	Ilkeston Town
72	Woking	0–0	Chatham Town
73	Wokingham Town	6–1	Andover
74	Wootton Blue Cross	2–0	Kempston Rovers
75	Worthing	7–1	Fleet Town

=== Replays ===
Tie	Home team	Score	Away team
5	Chester-Le-Street	2–1	Ashington
9	Dulwich Hamlet	6–0	Berkhamsted Town
15	March Town United	3–2	Cambridge City
28	Milton Keynes City	1–4	Friar Lane Old Boys
30	Durham City	2–2	Gateshead
37	Hillingdon Borough	0–1	Hemel Hempstead
42	Redditch United	2–3	Kidderminster Harriers
48	Racing Club Warwick	4–3	Malvern Town
53	Ton Pentre	4–1	Moreton Town
56	Basingstoke Town	2–0	Poole Town
63	Burscough	4–1	Stalybridge Celtic
72	Chatham Town	2–1	Woking

=== 2nd replay ===
Tie	Home team	Score	Away team
30	Durham City	1–2	Gateshead

== 1st qualifying round ==
=== Ties ===
Tie	Home team	Score	Away team
1	Accrington Stanley	1–1	Harrogate Town
2	Alfreton Town	0–4	Shepshed Charterhouse
3	Alvechurch	2–4	Worcester City
4	Armitage	3–2	Willenhall Town
5	Ashton United	6–2	Leyland Motors
6	Aveley	5–0	Haverhill Rovers
7	Banbury United	0–2	Kidderminster Harriers
8	Bath City	2–2	Taunton Town
9	Belper Town	1–1	Mexborough Town Athletic
10	Billericay Town	3–1	Wisbech Town
11	Billingham Synthonia	0–1	Seaham Colliery Welfare Red Star
12	Bilston	2–2	Blakenall
13	Blue Star	1–2	Lancaster City
14	Bridgend Town	2–1	Cinderford Town
15	Bridgwater Town	1–1	Mangotsfield United
16	Brigg Town	1–1	Goole Town
17	Brockenhurst	1–2	A F C Totton
18	Burgess Hill Town	2–2	Canterbury City
19	Chard Town	2–1	Penzance
20	Chatteris Town	1–6	Great Yarmouth Town
21	Chesham United	3–2	Cray Wanderers
22	Chippenham Town	1–1	Basingstoke Town
23	Clapton	3–1	Chalfont St Peter
24	Clevedon Town	0–2	St Blazey
25	Colwyn Bay	0–3	Caernarfon Town
26	Coventry Sporting	0–4	A P Leamington
27	Crawley Town	1–2	Worthing
28	Curzon Ashton	4–1	Rhyl
29	Darwen	2–0	Southport
30	Deal Town	3–1	Redhill
31	Devizes Town	1–0	Camberley Town
32	Eastbourne Town	1–3	Bognor Regis Town
33	Eastleigh	2–2	Newport I O W
34	Eastwood Town	4–2	Prestwich Heys
35	Edgware w/o-scr Bedford Town		
36	Egham Town	0–0	Faversham Town
37	Ely City	1–3	Lowestoft Town
38	Emley	3–6	South Bank
39	Enderby Town	1–4	Sutton Coldfield Town
40	Erith & Belvedere	1–2	Wembley
41	Evenwood Town	1–3	Horden Colliery Welfare
42	Falmouth Town	1–2	Wimborne Town
43	Fareham Town	2–3	Farnborough Town
44	Farsley Celtic	3–0	Bridlington Trinity
45	Felixstowe Town	1–1	Irthlingborough Diamonds
46	Feltham	3–0	Tiptree United
47	Ferryhill Athletic	0–1	Barrow
48	Flackwell Heath	0–1	Bedworth United
49	Fleetwood Town	1–2	Spennymoor United
50	Folkestone	2–0	Burnham
51	Forest Green Rovers	2–3	Barry Town
52	Frome Town	1–1	Witney Town
53	Gainsborough Trinity	2–2	Appleby Frodingham{1}
54	Glastonbury	1–1	Barnstaple Town
55	Glossop	2–5	Worksop Town
56	Gloucester City	1–0	Llanelli
57	Gorleston	2–3	King's Lynn
58	Gosport Borough	1–0	Bracknell Town
59	Grantham	2–0	Hinckley Athletic
60	Grays Athletic	1–0	Barton Rovers
61	Guisborough Town	0–0	Chester-Le-Street
62	Hailsham Town	0–3	Margate
63	Halesowen Town	1–2	Corby Town
64	Hampton	2–0	Croydon
65	Haringey Borough	0–3	Hemel Hempstead
66	Hastings Town	2–7	Chatham Town
67	Hayes	2–1	Saffron Walden Town
68	Haywards Heath	1–6	Dartford
69	Hednesford Town	1–2	Congleton Town
70	Hitchin Town	0–4	Wellingborough Town
71	Hoddesdon Town	0–2	Windsor & Eton
72	Holbeach United	3–1	Long Eaton United
73	Horley Town	1–2	Carshalton Athletic
74	Hornchurch	1–0	Harwich & Parkeston
75	Horndean	1–1	Eastbourne United
76	Horsham	0–3	Kingstonian
77	Horsham Y M C A	1–1	Ramsgate
78	Hungerford Town	0–3	Merthyr Tydfil
79	Letchworth Garden City	0–6	Harrow Borough
80	Lewes	2–3	Tooting & Mitcham United
81	Leyton Wingate	2–2	Dulwich Hamlet
82	Macclesfield Town	3–1	Bangor City
83	Maidenhead United	4–2	Chichester City
84	Merstham	0–2	Hendon
85	Mile Oak Rovers	2–0	Buckingham Town
86	Moor Green	4–0	Sutton Town
87	Nantwich Town	0–3	Witton Albion
88	Netherfield	0–2	Frickley Athletic
89	New Mills{1}	0–3	Horwich R M I
90	Newmarket Town	0–3	Boreham Wood
91	North Shields	6–0	Eppleton Colliery Welfare
92	Oldbury United	0–0	Burton Albion
93	Ossett Albion	1–2	Hyde United
94	Oswestry Town	2–1	Burscough
95	Oxford City	2–2	Dorchester Town
96	Pagham	1–3	Hastings United
97	Peterlee Newtown	1–2	Gateshead
98	Prescot Cables	2–1	Marine
99	Ringmer	2–1	Addlestone & Weybridge Town
100	Rossendale United	0–3	Chorley
101	Rothwell Town	3–0	Darlaston
102	Royston Town	0–5	Leytonstone Ilford
103	Rushall Olympic	1–1	Dudley Town
104	Rushden Town	0–2	Bridgnorth Town
105	Shepton Mallet Town	3–0	Torrington
106	Shifnal Town	1–0	Leek Town
107	Skegness Town	3–0	March Town United
108	Slough Town	2–0	Salisbury
109	Southall	1–1	Sittingbourne
110	Southwick	2–2	Banstead Athletic
111	St Albans City	4–1	Abingdon Town
112	St Helens Town	0–4	Bootle
113	Staines Town	5–0	Dorking
114	Stamford	1–1	Nuneaton Borough
115	Steyning Town	3–4	Dover
116	Stourbridge	3–0	Friar Lane Old Boys
117	Sudbury Town	1–1	Chelmsford City
118	Tamworth	2–1	Racing Club Warwick
119	Telford United	3–0	Buxton
120	Thackley	0–0	Runcorn
121	Thame United	2–3	Cheltenham Town
122	Three Bridges	0–0	Uxbridge
123	Tilbury	3–2	Stowmarket
124	Tiverton Town	2–2	Liskeard Athletic
125	Tividale	0–1	Bromsgrove Rovers
126	Tonbridge	2–0	Walton & Hersham
127	Tow Law Town	3–5	Morecambe
128	Tring Town	1–0	Dunstable
129	Trowbridge Town	2–0	Ton Pentre
130	V S Rugby	3–1	Highgate United
131	Walthamstow Avenue	2–0	Wootton Blue Cross
132	Ware	1–1	Soham Town Rangers
133	Wealdstone	5–0	Hertford Town
134	Welling United	2–0	Sheppey United
135	Welton Rovers	0–0	Bristol Manor Farm
136	Weston Super Mare	1–4	Bideford
137	Whitstable Town	1–0	Bromley
138	Whyteleafe	0–0	Wokingham Town
139	Wick	1–2	Corinthian-Casuals
140	Willington	0–5	Brandon United
141	Wingate (Durham)	1–3	Annfield Plain
142	Winterton Rangers	4–3	Bourne Town
143	Woodford Town	3–1	Heybridge Swifts
144	Yorkshire Amateur	0–1	Bishop Auckland

=== Replays ===
Tie	Home team	Score	Away team
1	Harrogate Town	3–1	Accrington Stanley
8	Taunton Town	2–4	Bath City
9	Mexborough Town Athletic	0–3	Belper Town
12	Blakenall	1–2	Bilston
15	Mangotsfield United	1–2	Bridgwater Town
16	Goole Town	7–2	Brigg Town
18	Canterbury City	2–1	Burgess Hill Town
22	Basingstoke Town	3–2	Chippenham Town
33	Newport I O W	1–3	Eastleigh
36	Faversham Town	1–3	Egham Town
45	Irthlingborough Diamonds	3–1	Felixstowe Town
52	Witney Town	2–2	Frome Town
53	Appleby Frodingham{1}	0–0	Gainsborough Trinity
54	Barnstaple Town	4–1	Glastonbury
61	Chester-Le-Street	3–0	Guisborough Town
75	Eastbourne United	3–2	Horndean
77	Ramsgate	2–1	Horsham Y M C A
81	Dulwich Hamlet	2–0	Leyton Wingate
92	Burton Albion	1–0	Oldbury United
95	Dorchester Town	1–0	Oxford City
103	Dudley Town	0–1	Rushall Olympic
109	Sittingbourne	1–3	Southall
110	Banstead Athletic	0–1	Southwick
114	Nuneaton Borough	5–0	Stamford
117	Chelmsford City	3–1	Sudbury Town
120	Runcorn	2–1	Thackley
122	Uxbridge	1–2	Three Bridges
124	Liskeard Athletic	2–1	Tiverton Town
132	Soham Town Rangers	4–2	Ware
135	Bristol Manor Farm	1–0	Welton Rovers
138	Wokingham Town	1–0	Whyteleafe

=== 2nd replays ===
Tie	Home team	Score	Away team
52	Frome Town	2–1	Witney Town
53	Gainsborough Trinity	2–1	Appleby Frodingham{1}

== 2nd qualifying round ==
=== Ties ===
Tie	Home team	Score	Away team
1	A P Leamington	6–1	Bridgnorth Town
2	Armitage	1–1	Belper Town
3	Ashton United	0–0	Bootle
4	Aveley	1–3	Walthamstow Avenue
5	Basingstoke Town	2–2	Slough Town
6	Bath City	4–2	Barnstaple Town
7	Bideford	3–1	Shepton Mallet Town
8	Billericay Town	5–3	Soham Town Rangers
9	Bishop Auckland	2–3	Annfield Plain
10	Boreham Wood	3–0	Hayes
11	Bridgend Town	1–0	Bridgwater Town
12	Bromsgrove Rovers	2–2	Moor Green
13	Burton Albion	2–4	Shifnal Town
14	Caernarfon Town	4–1	Prescot Cables
15	Carshalton Athletic	3–1	Southwick
16	Chelmsford City	3–2	Grays Athletic
17	Cheltenham Town	5–1	Gloucester City
18	Chesham United	3–1	Clapton
19	Chester-Le-Street	1–5	Morecambe
20	Chorley	0–0	Darwen
21	Corby Town	1–0	Bedworth United
22	Corinthian-Casuals	1–0	Ramsgate
23	Dorchester Town	1–1	Maidenhead United
24	Dover	0–3	Deal Town
25	Edgware	0–1	Woodford Town
26	Egham Town	2–0	Welling United
27	Farnborough Town	2–1	Eastbourne United
28	Frickley Athletic	3–1	Harrogate Town
29	Frome Town	4–2	Devizes Town
30	Gateshead	5–1	Farsley Celtic
31	Goole Town	0–2	Shepshed Charterhouse
32	Gosport Borough	2–2	A F C Totton
33	Great Yarmouth Town	1–1	Wellingborough Town
34	Harrow Borough	2–3	Feltham
35	Hastings United	1–2	Margate
36	Hemel Hempstead	1–2	Dulwich Hamlet
37	Hendon	1–1	Wealdstone
38	Holbeach United	1–0	Rushall Olympic
39	Horden Colliery Welfare	0–1	North Shields
40	Horwich R M I	5–1	Oswestry Town
41	Hyde United	2–5	Macclesfield Town
42	King's Lynn	2–1	Lowestoft Town
43	Kingstonian	4–3	Three Bridges
44	Lancaster City	0–0	Barrow
45	Leytonstone Ilford	1–1	Tilbury
46	Liskeard Athletic	3–0	Chard Town
47	Merthyr Tydfil	3–1	Barry Town
48	Mile Oak Rovers	2–7	Kidderminster Harriers
49	Nuneaton Borough	3–3	Gainsborough Trinity
50	Ringmer	0–2	Folkestone
51	Runcorn	3–0	Curzon Ashton
52	Skegness Town	0–0	Irthlingborough Diamonds
53	South Bank	2–1	Brandon United
54	Southall	2–2	Chatham Town
55	Spennymoor United	2–1	Seaham Colliery Welfare Red Star
56	St Albans City	1–3	Hampton
57	Staines Town	0–2	Wokingham Town
58	Stourbridge	3–2	Tamworth
59	Sutton Coldfield Town	2–1	V S Rugby
60	Telford United	3–2	Congleton Town
61	Tonbridge	2–3	Dartford
62	Tooting & Mitcham United	2–0	Canterbury City
63	Tring Town	2–2	Hornchurch
64	Trowbridge Town	3–0	Bristol Manor Farm
65	Wembley	1–3	Windsor & Eton
66	Whitstable Town	0–3	Bognor Regis Town
67	Wimborne Town	3–2	St Blazey
68	Winterton Rangers	0–0	Grantham
69	Witton Albion	4–2	Bilston
70	Worcester City	3–1	Rothwell Town
71	Worksop Town	1–1	Eastwood Town
72	Worthing	3–1	Eastleigh

=== Replays ===
Tie	Home team	Score	Away team
2	Belper Town	0–1	Armitage
3	Bootle	0–1	Ashton United
5	Slough Town	2–0	Basingstoke Town
12	Moor Green	1–0	Bromsgrove Rovers
20	Darwen	0–3	Chorley
23	Maidenhead United	0–2	Dorchester Town
32	A F C Totton	2–1	Gosport Borough
33	Wellingborough Town	2–0	Great Yarmouth Town
37	Wealdstone	3–2	Hendon
44	Barrow	1–0	Lancaster City
45	Tilbury	2–2	Leytonstone Ilford
49	Gainsborough Trinity	2–0	Nuneaton Borough
52	Irthlingborough Diamonds	1–0	Skegness Town
54	Chatham Town	4–2	Southall
63	Hornchurch	0–0	Tring Town
68	Grantham	4–0	Winterton Rangers
71	Eastwood Town	3–1	Worksop Town

=== 2nd replays ===
Tie	Home team	Score	Away team
45	Leytonstone Ilford	2–1	Tilbury
63	Hornchurch	0–3	Tring Town

== 3rd qualifying round ==
=== Ties ===
Tie	Home team	Score	Away team
1	A F C Totton	1–0	Dorchester Town
2	Ashton United	0–2	Macclesfield Town
3	Barrow	8–0	Annfield Plain
4	Bognor Regis Town	3–0	Margate
5	Boreham Wood	3–0	Tring Town
6	Bridgend Town	1–3	Merthyr Tydfil
7	Chatham Town	1–1	Folkestone
8	Chelmsford City	0–0	Leytonstone Ilford
9	Chesham United	1–0	Feltham
10	Chorley	2–2	Runcorn
11	Dartford	2–1	Corinthian-Casuals
12	Dulwich Hamlet	0–0	Wealdstone
13	Eastwood Town	2–2	Telford United
14	Egham Town	0–2	Carshalton Athletic
15	Frickley Athletic	1–1	Spennymoor United
16	Gateshead	2–4	North Shields
17	Grantham	3–1	Armitage
18	Hampton	1–2	Windsor & Eton
19	Holbeach United	2–1	Moor Green
20	Horwich R M I	2–2	Caernarfon Town
21	Irthlingborough Diamonds	1–2	King's Lynn
22	Kidderminster Harriers	1–3	Corby Town
23	Liskeard Athletic	1–2	Bideford
24	Morecambe	1–1	South Bank
25	Shepshed Charterhouse	3–2	Gainsborough Trinity
26	Slough Town	3–0	Frome Town
27	Stourbridge	1–1	A P Leamington
28	Sutton Coldfield Town	2–4	Worcester City
29	Tooting & Mitcham United	8–1	Deal Town
30	Trowbridge Town	1–1	Cheltenham Town
31	Walthamstow Avenue	2–0	Woodford Town
32	Wellingborough Town	1–1	Billericay Town
33	Wimborne Town	1–0	Bath City
34	Witton Albion	0–2	Shifnal Town
35	Wokingham Town	2–2	Kingstonian
36	Worthing	1–0	Farnborough Town

=== Replays ===
Tie	Home team	Score	Away team
7	Folkestone	5–0	Chatham Town
8	Leytonstone Ilford	0–0	Chelmsford City
10	Runcorn	4–0	Chorley
12	Wealdstone	2–1	Dulwich Hamlet
13	Telford United	4–0	Eastwood Town
15	Spennymoor United	1–1	Frickley Athletic
20	Caernarfon Town	0–2	Horwich R M I
24	South Bank	1–0	Morecambe
27	A P Leamington	2–0	Stourbridge
30	Cheltenham Town	1–0	Trowbridge Town
32	Billericay Town	1–2	Wellingborough Town
35	Kingstonian	1–1	Wokingham Town

=== 2nd replays ===
Tie	Home team	Score	Away team
8	Chelmsford City	2–1	Leytonstone Ilford
15	Frickley Athletic	2–3	Spennymoor United
35	Wokingham Town	2–0	Kingstonian

== 4th qualifying round ==
The teams that given byes to this round are Dagenham, Northwich Victoria, Scarborough, Weymouth, Boston United, Yeovil Town, Stafford Rangers, Maidstone United, Kettering Town, Gravesend & Northfleet, Bishop's Stortford, Sutton United, Mossley, Leatherhead, Workington, Minehead, Blyth Spartans, Barking, Harlow Town and Penrith.

=== Ties ===
Tie	Home team	Score	Away team
1	A F C Totton	0–0	Windsor & Eton
2	Barking	0–2	Folkestone
3	Boreham Wood	1–1	Dartford
4	Boston United	4–1	Shifnal Town
5	Chelmsford City	1–3	Chesham United
6	Cheltenham Town	0–0	Weymouth
7	Corby Town	0–1	Holbeach United
8	Dagenham	2–0	Tooting & Mitcham United
9	Gravesend & Northfleet	1–2	Maidstone United
10	Harlow Town	1–1	Bishop's Stortford
11	Horwich R M I	2–2	Runcorn
12	Kettering Town	3–1	A P Leamington
13	Macclesfield Town	3–1	Stafford Rangers
14	North Shields	2–1	Barrow
15	Northwich Victoria	3–0	Blyth Spartans
16	Scarborough	4–2	Spennymoor United
17	Shepshed Charterhouse	2–1	King's Lynn
18	Slough Town	7–1	Bideford
19	South Bank	0–1	Mossley
20	Telford United	3–0	Grantham
21	Walthamstow Avenue	1–1	Carshalton Athletic
22	Wealdstone	3–1	Sutton United
23	Wimborne Town	1–0	Merthyr Tydfil
24	Wokingham Town	1–0	Leatherhead
25	Worcester City	2–1	Wellingborough Town
26	Workington	2–2	Penrith
27	Worthing	2–2	Minehead
28	Yeovil Town	4–2	Bognor Regis Town

=== Replays ===
Tie	Home team	Score	Away team
1	Windsor & Eton	1–0	A F C Totton
3	Dartford	2–1	Boreham Wood
6	Weymouth	4–0	Cheltenham Town
10	Bishop's Stortford	4–0	Harlow Town
11	Runcorn	0–1	Horwich R M I
21	Carshalton Athletic	2–1	Walthamstow Avenue
26	Penrith	0–2	Workington
27	Minehead	0–3	Worthing

== 1982–83 FA Cup ==
See 1982-83 FA Cup for details of the rounds from the first round proper onwards.
