= Jack Alderson =

English footballer

Personal information
- Full name: John Thomas Alderson
- Date of birth: 28 November 1891
- Place of birth: Crook, County Durham, England
- Date of death: 17 February 1972 (aged 80)
- Place of death: Sunderland, Tyne and Wear, England
- Position: Goalkeeper

Youth career
- Crook Juniors

Senior career*
Years	Team	Apps	(Gls)
- Crook Town
- Shildon Athletic
1912	Middlesbrough	0	(0)
1913	Barcelona	0	(0)
1913–1918	Newcastle United	1	(0)
1918–1924	Crystal Palace	192	(0)
1924–1925	Pontypridd		
1925–1929	Sheffield United	122	(0)
1929–1930	Exeter City	36	(0)
1930–1931	Torquay United	0	(0)
- Worcester City
- Crook Town

International career
1923	England	1	(0)

Managerial career
- 1913: Barcelona (player-coach)
- * Club domestic league appearances and goals

John Thomas Alderson (28 November 1891 – 17 February 1972) was an English professional footballer who played as a goalkeeper, making one appearance for the full England national team.

Born in Crook, County Durham, Alderson played from a number of amateur sides, before moving to Middlesbrough. After failing to establish himself on Teesside, he was briefly the player-coach of Barcelona. He then joined Newcastle United, where his career was interrupted by the outbreak of World War I. Following the war, he had a successful spell at Crystal Palace and another at Sheffield United, making over 100 appearances for each club.

== Playing career ==
=== Early career ===
Jack Alderson began his footballing career as a junior with his local side Crook Juniors, beginning his senior career with Crook Town. He moved to Shildon Athletic, before joining Football League side Middlesbrough.

While making guest appearances for West Auckland Wanderers during a set of friendlies against Barcelona in December 1912, club president Joan Gamper was impressed with his performances and signed him as player-coach. However, he never made his debut for Barcelona, as he was transferred to Newcastle United for £30. Despite not coaching the club, he remains Barcelona's youngest ever manager at the age of 21. On 25 January 1913, he made only appearance for Newcastle in a 3–1 win against Arsenal.

=== Crystal Palace ===
With the outbreak of World War I and with league football abandoned, Alderson served as a gunner in the Royal Garrison Artillery, whilst remaining on the books at Newcastle. Based at Woolwich, he played a number of wartime games for Crystal Palace as a guest player and at the end of the war, signed for Palace from Newcastle for a fee of £50. He was an ever-present in the first post-war season, 1919–20, as Palace finished third in the Southern League. At the end of the season, Palace, along with all the other Southern League clubs formed the new Football League Third Division, Alderson playing in their first ever Football League game, a 2–1 win away to Merthyr Town on 28 August 1920. He remained a constant in the Palace side as they were promoted as champions in their debut season.

Although Palace struggled in the Second Division, Alderson was a success and won his only England cap on 10 May 1923, playing in a 4–1 win against France in Paris. In 2005, Palace's centenary year, Alderson was voted their third best goalkeeper of all time, being beaten only by the more recent players Nigel Martyn (winner) and John Jackson (runner-up). Following a dispute with Crystal Palace over a benefit match Alderson moved to Pontypridd in 1924, having played 205 first team games for Palace.

=== Sheffield United ===
With FA Cup holders Sheffield United looking for a replacement keeper, they turned to Alderson who had a reputation as a spectacular shot stopper and penalty saver. The football committee (who ran the club at the time) were not completely convinced however, and sanctioned the £500 move only if the player was under thirty. Club secretary John Nicholson was tasked with verifying the matter and the fee was duly paid to Crystal Palace who still retained his registration. Alderson arrived at Bramall Lane with the local press citing him as 29 – this being far from the truth as he was in fact 34.

Despite his confusing transfer, Alderson was a success at United, playing 137 games in four years, although he was often considered eccentric and unreliable by his teammates, particularly his liking for entertaining the fans during a game by touching the ground without bending his knees.

=== Later career ===
Moving to the South coast, Alderson joined Exeter City in 1929, before moving to local rivals Torquay United, but with Joe Wright as first choice keeper and Laurie Millsom as an able understudy, Alderson left without making a first team appearance.

He subsequently played for Worcester City, before rejoining Crook Town, where he ended his playing career.
