= Geoff Chilvers =

English footballer (1925–1971)

Personal information
- Date of birth: 31 January 1925
- Place of birth: Sutton, UK
- Date of death: 1971 (aged 45–46)
- Position: Wing-half

Senior career*
Years	Team	Apps	(Gls)
?–1942	Sutton United	?	(?)
1942–1954	Crystal Palace	118	(1)
1954–?	Gravesend & Northfleet	?	(?)
- * Club domestic league appearances and goals

Geoff T. Chilvers (31 January 1925 – 1971) was a professional footballer who made 118 appearances in the Football League for Crystal Palace as a wing-half. He also played non-league football for Sutton United and for Gravesend & Northfleet.

== Playing career ==
Chilvers began his career at Sutton United and signed for Crystal Palace in 1942. He made his senior debut in a wartime, London League, 10–1 home win against Brighton on 3 January 1942. However, that was his only appearance that season and he did not make a further appearance until March 1946, with a single game in the wartime Division Three South (South Region).

Chilvers did not make his Football League debut until 2 October 1948 in a 1–3 home defeat to Walsall and went on to make 17 league appearances that season, scoring once.

Over the subsequent five seasons, Chilvers made 15, 30, 22, 28 and 6 appearances respectively, without scoring before moving on to Gravesend & Northfleet in 1954. He made a total of 123 senior appearances for Palace including five in the FA Cup but excluding his wartime appearances.

== Personal life ==
Geoff Chilvers died in 1971 aged 45 or 46.
