= Frank Manders =

English footballer

Personal information
- Date of birth: 13 June 1914
- Place of birth: Camberley, England
- Date of death: 17 March 1942 (aged 27)
- Place of death: Boldmere, England
- Height: 5 ft 9 in (1.75 m)
- Position: Forward

Youth career
- ?: Aldershot

Senior career*
Years	Team	Apps	(Gls)
1931–1935	Crystal Palace	98	(31)
1935–?	Norwich City	?	(?)
- * Club domestic league appearances and goals

Frank Manders (13 June 1914 – 17 March 1942) was an English professional footballer who played as a forward. He made over 100 senior appearances for Crystal Palace and also played for Norwich City.

== Playing career ==
Manders began his youth career at Aldershot and signed for Crystal Palace, then playing in Division Three South of the Football League, in July 1931. He made only one appearance in the 1931–32 season, becoming one of Palace's youngest ever players on 26 September, at age 17 years and 105 days, in a home 2–2 draw against Coventry City.

In the 1932–33 season, Manders played more regularly, making 25 league appearances and scoring 10 goals. In 1933–34 and 1934–35, Manders made 23 league appearances (10 goals) and 36 appearances (14 goals) respectively. In 1935–6, Manders began the season as a first-choice forward but after 12 appearances (two goals) moved on to Norwich City in October.

At Norwich, Manders was a regular in the side and scored 40 goals between 1935 and 1939 when regular league football was suspended after the outbreak of World War II.

== Personal life ==
Manders died in 1942 aged 27. While serving as a leading aircraftman in the Royal Air Force, he drowned himself in a pool at Sutton Coldfield municipal golf course due to depression at suffering from scabies.
