= James Wild (rugby league) =

Rugby league player

Personal information
- Full name: James Wild
- Born: unknown
- Died: unknown

Playing information
- Position: Loose forward
Club
Years	Team	Pld	T	G	FG	P
Sep 1911–Jan 25	Wakefield Trinity	154	15	1		46

James "Jim" Wild (birth unknown – death unknown) was a professional rugby league footballer who played in the 1910s and 1920s. He played at club level Wakefield Trinity, as a loose forward.

== Notable tour matches ==
Jim Wild played loose forward in Wakefield Trinity's 3–29 defeat by Australia in the 1921–22 Kangaroo tour of Great Britain match at Belle Vue, Wakefield on Saturday 22 October 1921.
