= Bob Bigg =

English footballer (1911-1991)

Personal information
- Date of birth: 11 March 1911
- Place of birth: Cairo, Egypt
- Date of death: 1991 (aged 79–80)
- Height: 5 ft 9 in (1.75 m)
- Position: Midfielder

Senior career*
Years	Team	Apps	(Gls)
- Redhill
1934–1939	Crystal Palace	109	(41)
- Aldershot
- * Club domestic league appearances and goals

Bob Bigg (11 March 1911 – 1991) was an English professional footballer who played as a midfielder.

== Playing career ==
Bigg began his career in non-league football with Redhill F.C. and in 1934, signed for Crystal Palace then playing in the Football League Third Division South. He made a scoring debut in the first game of the 1934–35 season, in an away 2–2 draw against Aldershot F.C. He scored in the next two games also and went on to make 33 League appearances that season, scoring 16 times. in 1935–36, he made 41 appearances, scoring 12 times and 28 appearances (11 goals) in 1936–37. However, Bigg missed the latter part of the 1936–37 season (from February onwards) together with the whole of the 1937–8 season, returning in December 1938, to make a further seven appearances scoring twice. At the end of the 1938–39 season Bigg moved on to Aldershot but made one appearance for Palace in Wartime League football in February 1940. He had made a total of 114 appearances for Palace in all competitions scoring 41 times.

== Personal life ==
Bigg died in 1991 aged 69 or 70.
