= Jimmy Wilde (footballer, fl. 1914–1923) =

English footballer

Personal information
- Place of birth: Tinsley, England
- Position: Defender

Senior career*
Years	Team	Apps	(Gls)
1914–1915	Burnley	1	(0)
1920–1921	Reading	24	(0)
1921–1923	Accrington Stanley	34	(0)
Total		59	(0)
- * Club domestic league appearances and goals

James T. Wilde was an English professional footballer who played as a defender.
