= Gary Stebbing =

English footballer

Personal information
- Date of birth: 11 August 1965 (age 61)
- Place of birth: Croydon, England
- Height: 5 ft 9 in (1.75 m)
- Position: Midfielder

Youth career
- –1983: Crystal Palace

Senior career*
Years	Team	Apps	(Gls)
1983–1988	Crystal Palace	102	(3)
1985–1986	→ Southend United (loan)	5	(0)
1986–1989	K.V. Oostende		
1989–1992	Maidstone United	76	(4)
1992–1993	Kettering Town		
- Dagenham & Redbridge

International career
1983	England U17	1	(0)
1983–1984	England Youth	10	(1)
1985	England U19	4	(0)
1985	England U20	3	(0)
- * Club domestic league appearances and goals

Gary S. Stebbing (born 11 August 1965) is a former professional footballer who played in The Football League for Crystal Palace, Southend United and Maidstone United. He was signed from the Crystal Palace junior ranks in 1983 and went on to play 102 times in the Football League Second Division for the club. In 1989 he signed for Football League newcomers Maidstone United. He was with the club for three years and played 76 times in the Football League Fourth Division, and was one of the club's final two registered players when they went bankrupt and resigned from the league in August 1992. He subsequently moved into non-league football with Kettering Town.
