= Webley Stinger =

- Type: Air pistol
- Place of origin: United Kingdom

Production history
- Manufacturer: Webley & Scott

Specifications
- Cartridge: .177 ball bearing
- Barrels: 1
- Feed system: 45 round internal hopper
- Sights: Iron; Can be fitted with various scopes

The Webley Stinger is an air pistol of British origin. The pistol is chambered to fire 45 .177 calibre ball bearings fed from an internal overhead gravity fed hopper. The Webley Stinger uses a slide action to fire each round.
