= 1975–76 FA Vase =

Football Association Vase

Tournament details
- Country: England; Wales

Final positions
- Champions: Billericay Town
- Runners-up: Stamford

The 1975–76 FA Vase was the second season of the FA Vase, an annual football competition for teams in the lower reaches of the English football league system.

Billericay Town won the competition, beating Stamford in the final.

== Quarter-finals ==
Home team	Score	Away team
Friar Lane Old Boys	2–0	South Shields
Stamford	3–0	Addlestone Town

Home team	Score	Away team
Farnborough Town	2–0	Barton Rovers
Cadbury Heath	0–3	Billericay Town

== Semi-finals ==
Leg no	Home team (tier)	Score	Away team (tier)	Attendance
1st	Billericay Town	2–1	Farnborough Town	
2nd	Farnborough Town	0–0	Billericay Town	

Billericay Town won 2–1 on aggregate.

Leg no	Home team (tier)	Score	Away team (tier)	Attendance
1st	Friar Lane Old Boys	1–2	Stamford	
2nd	Stamford	3–1	Friar Lane Old Boys	

Stamford won 5–2 on aggregate.

== Final ==
10 April 1976

Billericay Town	1–0	Stamford
Aslett

Wembley Stadium, London
Attendance: 11,848
