= 1984–85 FA Cup qualifying rounds =

Tournament details
- Country: England; Wales

The FA Cup 1984–85 is the 104th season of the world's oldest football knockout competition; The Football Association Challenge Cup, or FA Cup for short. The large number of clubs entering the tournament from lower down the English football league system meant that the competition started with a number of preliminary and qualifying rounds. The 28 victorious teams from the fourth round qualifying progressed to the first round proper.

== Preliminary round ==
=== Ties ===
Tie	Home team	Score	Away team
1	Abingdon Town	1–3	Baldock Town
2	Addlestone & Weybridge Town	7–0	Letchworth Garden City
3	Alfreton Town	4–2	Eastwood Hanley
4	Ampthill Town	1–0	Barton Rovers
5	Andover	6–0	Calne Town
6	Appleby Frodingham{1}	2–0	Glossop
7	Arlesey Town	2–2	Cheshunt
8	Arnold	1–4	Ilkeston Town
9	Banstead Athletic	2–3	Lewes
10	Barnstaple Town	4–1	St Blazey
11	Basingstoke Town	2–0	Dorking
12	Bideford	2–1	Bristol Manor Farm
13	Billingham Town	2–0	Coundon T T
14	Blakenall	2–0	Mile Oak Rovers
15	Boldmere St Michaels	2–2	Halesowen Town
16	Boreham Wood	2–1	Haverhill Rovers
17	Braintree Town	0–0	Hillingdon
18	Brandon United	3–0	Harrogate Town
19	Bridgwater Town	w/o	Dorchester Town
20	Bridlington Trinity	0–2	Easington Colliery
21	Brigg Town	0–2	Tamworth
22	Brockenhurst	1–3	Chippenham Town
23	Bromley	4–0	Cray Wanderers
24	Burscough	2–1	Emley
25	Bury Town	3–0	Great Yarmouth Town
26	Caernarfon Town	4–1	Garforth Miners
27	Camberley Town	0–0	Eastbourne Town
28	Cambridge City	3–1	Hoddesdon Town
29	Chard Town	0–2	Shepton Mallet Town
30	Chatham Town	2–3	Metropolitan Police
31	Chatteris Town	1–4	Oldswinford
32	Chertsey Town	0–0	Lancing
33	Chester-Le-Street	3–0	Lancaster City
34	Chichester City	0–1	Kingstonian
35	Cinderford Town	1–2	Forest Green Rovers
36	Clandown	0–1	Haverfordwest County
37	Clapton	0–2	Dunstable
38	Colwyn Bay	1–0	Lytham
39	Coventry Sporting	0–0	Spalding United
40	Crockenhill	0–3	Grays Athletic
41	Deal Town	2–2	Hastings Town
42	Desborough Town	3–0	Racing Club Warwick
43	Dover Athletic	0–0	Horsham
44	Dudley Town	4–0	Heanor Town
45	Erith & Belvedere	2–2	Rainham Town
46	Esh Winning	0–1	Guisborough Town
47	Felixstowe Town	3–0	Harwich & Parkeston
48	Ferryhill Athletic	1–2	Guiseley
49	Finchley	1–2	Hornchurch
50	Fleet Town	1–1	Petersfield United
51	Haywards Heath	2–0	Merstham
52	Horley Town	0–3	Ruislip Manor
53	Leyton Wingate	1–0	Burnham
54	Littlehampton Town	1–1	Canterbury City
55	Long Eaton United	3–0	Curzon Ashton
56	Milton Keynes City	0–3	Rothwell Town
57	Nantwich Town	0–0	Droylsden
58	Ossett Albion	1–4	Formby
59	Paulton Rovers	2–1	Taunton Town
60	Peterlee Newtown	5–1	Eppleton Colliery Welfare
61	Prescot Cables	0–0	Ashton United
62	Radcliffe Borough	1–0	Clitheroe
63	Rossendale United	1–2	Denaby United
64	Salisbury	3–1	Marlow
65	Shifnal Town	2–2	Chadderton
66	Shildon	0–1	Crook Town
67	Southall	1–2	Maidenhead United
68	Southwick	1–1	Egham Town
69	St Helens Town	6–1	Coleshill Town
70	Stamford	0–2	Irthlingborough Diamonds
71	Stevenage Borough	8–0	Holbeach United
72	Steyning Town	1–2	Redhill
73	Stowmarket	1–1	Gorleston
74	Sudbury Town	8–1	Edgware
75	Thackley	0–2	Darwen
76	Thame United	2–11	Hungerford Town
77	Tilbury	0–1	Epping Town
78	Tonbridge	4–1	Molesey
79	Tring Town	3–1	Kingsbury Town
80	Walsall Borough	1–4	Gresley Rovers
81	Walton & Hersham	1–0	Eastbourne United
82	Wednesfield Social	0–0	Friar Lane Old Boys
83	Wellington (Somerset)	5–1	Devizes Town
84	Welton Rovers	0–0	Clevedon Town
85	Wembley	2–1	Bourne Town
86	Whitstable Town	1–0	Burgess Hill Town
87	Wisbech Town	3–0	Evesham United
88	Wootton Blue Cross	3–2	Histon
89	Yorkshire Amateur	0–1	Consett

=== Replays ===
Tie	Home team	Score	Away team
7	Cheshunt	0–1	Arlesey Town
15	Halesowen Town	1–1	Boldmere St Michaels
17	Hillingdon	0–0	Braintree Town
27	Eastbourne Town	2–1	Camberley Town
32	Lancing	1–0	Chertsey Town
39	Spalding United	2–3	Coventry Sporting
41	Hastings Town	3–1	Deal Town
43	Horsham	0–1	Dover Athletic
45	Rainham Town	3–1	Erith & Belvedere
50	Petersfield United	1–3	Fleet Town
54	Canterbury City	6–0	Littlehampton Town
57	Droylsden	2–0	Nantwich Town
61	Ashton United	3–1	Prescot Cables
65	Chadderton	2–1	Shifnal Town
68	Egham Town	2–1	Southwick
73	Gorleston	3–0	Stowmarket
82	Friar Lane Old Boys	0–0	Wednesfield Social
84	Clevedon Town	1–0	Welton Rovers

=== 2nd replays ===
Tie	Home team	Score	Away team
15	Halesowen Town	1–0	Boldmere St Michaels
17	Hillingdon	0–2	Braintree Town
82	Friar Lane Old Boys	2–1	Wednesfield Social

== 1st qualifying round ==
=== Ties ===
Tie	Home team	Score	Away team
1	Accrington Stanley	2–1	Ilkeston Town
2	Alvechurch	4–1	Boreham Wood
3	Ampthill Town	1–4	Oxford City
4	Armitage	0–4	Witton Albion
5	Arundel	2–2	Worthing
6	Ashford Town (Kent)	1–2	Lewes
7	Ashington	3–1	Whitley Bay
8	Ashton United	0–0	Hyde United
9	Aveley	5–0	March Town United
10	Aylesbury United	3–2	Hayes
11	Banbury United	1–4	Willenhall Town
12	Barrow	4–0	Colwyn Bay
13	Barry Town	3–2	Forest Green Rovers
14	Basildon United	4–0	Felixstowe Town
15	Bath City	4–1	Barnstaple Town
16	Beckenham Town	0–2	Hitchin Town
17	Bedworth United	0–0	Coventry Sporting
18	Belper Town	1–1	Rhyl
19	Berkhamsted Town	0–0	V S Rugby
20	Billericay Town	1–1	Cambridge City
21	Billingham Synthonia	2–1	Brandon United
22	Bilston Town	3–2	South Liverpool
23	Bishop Auckland	4–3	Chester-Le-Street
24	Blue Star	3–0	Horden Colliery Welfare
25	Blyth Spartans	1–1	Guisborough Town
26	Bognor Regis Town	2–2	Basingstoke Town
27	Bootle	0–2	Marine
28	Boston	1–4	Matlock Town
29	Bracknell Town	0–3	Tooting & Mitcham United
30	Bridgend Town	0–2	Witney Town
31	Bridgnorth Town	3–2	Redditch United
32	Bromley	1–1	Heybridge Swifts
33	Bromsgrove Rovers	2–5	Shepshed Charterhouse
34	Buckingham Town	2–2	Braintree Town
35	Burscough	3–0	Skelmersdale United
36	Bury Town	0–2	Saffron Walden Town
37	Canterbury City	3–0	Faversham Town
38	Carshalton Athletic	4–0	Lancing
39	Chadderton	0–0	Oswestry Town
40	Chalfont St Peter	0–0	Oldbury United
41	Cheltenham Town	0–0	Bideford
42	Chippenham Town	3–0	Sholing Sports
43	Chorley	5–1	Blakenall
44	Clevedon Town	3–2	Waterlooville
45	Consett	0–2	Gateshead
46	Corby Town	2–1	Arlesey Town
47	Corinthian Casuals	0–3	Addlestone & Weybridge Town
48	Crawley Town	2–1	Ruislip Manor
49	Crook Town	3–1	Durham City
50	Darwen	1–2	Gretna
51	Denaby United	3–3	Buxton
52	Desborough Town	0–0	Wigston Fields
53	Dorchester Town	4–2	Weston Super Mare
54	Dover Athletic	1–0	Three Bridges
55	Droylsden	4–0	Fleetwood Town
56	Dudley Town	1–1	Paget Rangers
57	Dulwich Hamlet	0–2	Kingstonian
58	Easington Colliery	2–2	Wren Rovers
59	Eastbourne Town	9–2	Wick
60	Eastleigh	0–2	A F C Totton
61	Eastwood Town	1–0	Tamworth
62	Egham Town	3–0	Hailsham Town
63	Epping Town	3–4	Lowestoft Town
64	Fareham Town	2–1	Andover
65	Farnborough Town	5–1	Fleet Town
66	Fisher Athletic	6–1	Rainham Town
67	Formby	5–2	Lye Town
68	Friar Lane Old Boys	1–1	Goole Town
69	Frickley Athletic	3–0	Caernarfon Town
70	Gainsborough Trinity	3–0	Oldswinford
71	Gorleston	1–1	Haringey Borough
72	Grantham	0–2	Halesowen Town
73	Grays Athletic	3–0	St Albans City
74	Gresley Rovers	6–1	Lincoln United
75	Guiseley	1–1	West Auckland Town
76	Harefield United	0–2	Sutton United
77	Hastings United	2–1	Hastings Town
78	Haverfordwest County	2–2	Moreton Town
79	Haywards Heath	2–0	Woking
80	Hemel Hempstead	0–2	King's Lynn
81	Hendon	1–3	Dunstable
82	Herne Bay	0–3	Walthamstow Avenue
83	Hertford Town	2–2	Sutton Coldfield Town
84	Hinckley Athletic	1–3	Stalybridge Celtic
85	Hornchurch	2–1	Woodford Town
86	Horndean	1–3	Epsom & Ewell
87	Horsham Y M C A	1–8	Wokingham Town
88	Horwich R M I	3–0	Appleby Frodingham{1}
89	Hounslow	2–5	Wealdstone
90	Hungerford Town	2–1	Gosport Borough
91	Irthlingborough Diamonds	3–0	Leicester United
92	Leek Town	2–1	Runcorn
93	Leyland Motors	0–4	Southport
94	Leyton Wingate	2–2	Chesham United
95	Llanelli	2–5	Gloucester City
96	Long Eaton United	1–3	Hednesford Town
97	Maidenhead United	0–2	Potton United
98	Mangotsfield United	0–0	Highgate United
99	Melksham Town	0–3	R S Southampton
100	Metropolitan Police	5–0	Ware
101	Moor Green	2–1	Baldock Town
102	Morecambe	0–1	Alfreton Town
103	Netherfield	0–4	South Bank
104	Newbury Town	1–5	Slough Town
105	Newmarket Town	1–2	Wellingborough Town
106	North Ferriby United	2–2	Winsford United
107	North Shields	7–2	Billingham Town
108	Pagham	0–5	Leatherhead
109	Paulton Rovers	0–4	Wimborne Town
110	Peterlee Newtown	4–0	Evenwood Town
111	Poole Town	2–1	Shepton Mallet Town
112	Radcliffe Borough	5–2	Farsley Celtic
113	Redhill	3–2	Ringmer
114	Rothwell Town	2–1	Wolverton Town
115	Royston Town	0–3	Chelmsford City
116	Rushall Olympic	1–2	Kidderminster Harriers
117	Rushden Town	3–3	Stafford Rangers
118	Ryhope Community Association	4–2	Spennymoor United
119	Salisbury	4–1	Newport I O W
120	Saltash United	0–0	Merthyr Tydfil
121	Seaham Colliery Welfare Red Star	3–3	Tow Law Town
122	Sheppey United	2–0	Whitehawk
123	St Helens Town	2–0	Congleton Town
124	Stevenage Borough	2–1	Soham Town Rangers
125	Stourbridge	2–0	Sutton Town
126	Sudbury Town	2–0	Flackwell Heath
127	Thanet United	2–3	Sittingbourne
128	Tiptree United	0–4	Harlow Town
129	Tividale	1–2	Worksop Town
130	Ton Pentre	1–1	Trowbridge Town
131	Tonbridge	0–1	Folkestone
132	Torrington	0–1	Frome Town
133	Tring Town	1–0	Hampton
134	Tunbridge Wells	0–2	Leytonstone Ilford
135	Uxbridge	0–1	Welling United
136	Wadebridge Town	0–2	Minehead
137	Walton & Hersham	0–1	Gravesend & Northfleet
138	Wellington (Somerset)	2–3	Glastonbury
139	Wembley	3–1	A P Leamington
140	Whitstable Town	0–0	Croydon
141	Whyteleafe	0–1	Staines Town
142	Willington	2–5	Whitby Town
143	Wisbech Town	2–6	Nuneaton Borough
144	Wootton Blue Cross	0–4	Burton Albion

=== Replays ===
Tie	Home team	Score	Away team
5	Worthing	4–1	Arundel
8	Hyde United	2–4	Ashton United
17	Coventry Sporting	2–3	Bedworth United
18	Rhyl	1–0	Belper Town
19	V S Rugby	3–1	Berkhamsted Town
20	Cambridge City	3–1	Billericay Town
25	Guisborough Town	3–1	Blyth Spartans
26	Basingstoke Town	0–1	Bognor Regis Town
32	Heybridge Swifts	2–1	Bromley
34	Braintree Town	1–2	Buckingham Town
39	Oswestry Town	4–0	Chadderton
40	Oldbury United	1–1	Chalfont St Peter
41	Bideford	0–2	Cheltenham Town
51	Buxton	0–1	Denaby United
52	Wigston Fields	1–1	Desborough Town
56	Paget Rangers	2–3	Dudley Town
58	Wren Rovers	4–2	Easington Colliery
68	Goole Town	4–1	Friar Lane Old Boys
71	Haringey Borough	0–2	Gorleston
75	West Auckland Town	2–1	Guiseley
78	Moreton Town	1–1	Haverfordwest County
83	Sutton Coldfield Town	2–1	Hertford Town
94	Chesham United	1–0	Leyton Wingate
98	Highgate United	1–3	Mangotsfield United
106	Winsford United	3–1	North Ferriby United
117	Stafford Rangers	1–3	Rushden Town
120	Merthyr Tydfil	1–0	Saltash United
121	Tow Law Town	3–1	Seaham Colliery Welfare Red Star
130	Trowbridge Town	0–3	Ton Pentre
140	Croydon	5–0	Whitstable Town

=== 2nd replays ===
Tie	Home team	Score	Away team
40	Chalfont St Peter	1–3	Oldbury United
52	Desborough Town	1–2	Wigston Fields
78	Moreton Town	3–5	Haverfordwest County

== 2nd qualifying round ==
=== Ties ===
Tie	Home team	Score	Away team
1	A F C Totton	1–1	Farnborough Town
2	Ashington	0–5	Bishop Auckland
3	Aveley	2–1	Cambridge City
4	Aylesbury United	0–0	Buckingham Town
5	Bilston Town	0–1	Chorley
6	Blue Star	1–0	Billingham Synthonia
7	Burscough	2–0	Leek Town
8	Canterbury City	2–1	Croydon
9	Chippenham Town	2–2	R S Southampton
10	Crook Town	1–2	Gateshead
11	Dorchester Town	0–0	Merthyr Tydfil
12	Dover Athletic	1–4	Leatherhead
13	Droylsden	0–0	Denaby United
14	Dudley Town	1–1	Stalybridge Celtic
15	Eastbourne Town	2–4	Epsom & Ewell
16	Egham Town	1–0	Gravesend & Northfleet
17	Formby	1–0	St Helens Town
18	Glastonbury	1–2	Clevedon Town
19	Gorleston	1–0	Lowestoft Town
20	Grays Athletic	3–1	Sutton United
21	Gresley Rovers	0–2	Goole Town
22	Harlow Town	1–1	Basildon United
23	Haverfordwest County scr-w/o Gloucester City		
24	Haywards Heath	0–3	Sittingbourne
25	Hednesford Town	3–0	Ashton United
26	Heybridge Swifts	0–0	Chesham United
27	Hitchin Town	1–1	Fisher Athletic
28	Hornchurch	1–1	Chelmsford City
29	Irthlingborough Diamonds	0–5	Nuneaton Borough
30	Mangotsfield United	1–1	Barry Town
31	Marine	3–0	Barrow
32	Matlock Town	2–0	Eastwood Town
33	Metropolitan Police	3–1	Leytonstone Ilford
34	Minehead	0–0	Bath City
35	Oxford City	3–0	Oldbury United
36	Peterlee Newtown	0–0	Gretna
37	Potton United	0–2	Tring Town
38	Radcliffe Borough	0–1	Oswestry Town
39	Redhill	0–3	Folkestone
40	Rhyl	0–2	Frickley Athletic
41	Rothwell Town	1–4	Kidderminster Harriers
42	Rushden Town	0–1	Bridgnorth Town
43	Saffron Walden Town	0–0	King's Lynn
44	Salisbury	0–0	Hungerford Town
45	Sheppey United	0–1	Hastings United
46	Shepshed Charterhouse	2–5	Gainsborough Trinity
47	Slough Town	2–0	Fareham Town
48	Southport	1–1	Alfreton Town
49	Staines Town	4–2	Carshalton Athletic
50	Stevenage Borough	0–2	Burton Albion
51	Sudbury Town	0–0	Wembley
52	Sutton Coldfield Town	0–3	Moor Green
53	Ton Pentre	2–3	Cheltenham Town
54	Tooting & Mitcham United	2–2	Kingstonian
55	Tow Law Town	4–3	Guisborough Town
56	V S Rugby	5–0	Alvechurch
57	Walthamstow Avenue	1–0	Crawley Town
58	Wealdstone	6–0	Dunstable
59	Welling United	2–1	Addlestone & Weybridge Town
60	Wellingborough Town	1–4	Corby Town
61	West Auckland Town	0–6	South Bank
62	Whitby Town	1–1	North Shields
63	Wigston Fields	1–6	Stourbridge
64	Willenhall Town	3–0	Bedworth United
65	Wimborne Town	1–3	Frome Town
66	Winsford United	2–1	Horwich R M I
67	Witney Town	1–1	Poole Town
68	Witton Albion	4–0	Accrington Stanley
69	Wokingham Town	1–2	Bognor Regis Town
70	Worksop Town	0–3	Halesowen Town
71	Worthing	3–0	Lewes
72	Wren Rovers	2–3	Ryhope Community Association

=== Replays ===
Tie	Home team	Score	Away team
1	Farnborough Town	5–1	A F C Totton
4	Buckingham Town	4–0	Aylesbury United
9	R S Southampton	1–2	Chippenham Town
11	Merthyr Tydfil	3–0	Dorchester Town
13	Denaby United	2–0	Droylsden
14	Stalybridge Celtic	3–1	Dudley Town
22	Basildon United	2–3	Harlow Town
26	Chesham United	1–2	Heybridge Swifts
27	Fisher Athletic	3–1	Hitchin Town
28	Chelmsford City	6–1	Hornchurch
30	Barry Town	3–1	Mangotsfield United
34	Bath City	3–0	Minehead
36	Gretna	2–0	Peterlee Newtown
43	King's Lynn	2–1	Saffron Walden Town
44	Hungerford Town	3–0	Salisbury
48	Alfreton Town	3–0	Southport
51	Wembley	2–2	Sudbury Town
54	Kingstonian	0–4	Tooting & Mitcham United
62	North Shields	2–2	Whitby Town
67	Poole Town	0–0	Witney Town

=== 2nd replays ===
Tie	Home team	Score	Away team
51	Sudbury Town	0–3	Wembley
62	North Shields	1–1	Whitby Town
67	Witney Town	3–1	Poole Town

=== 3rd replay ===
Tie	Home team	Score	Away team
62	Whitby Town	2–0	North Shields

== 3rd qualifying round ==
=== Ties ===
Tie	Home team	Score	Away team
1	Burscough	2–2	Alfreton Town
2	Burton Albion	2–1	Willenhall Town
3	Canterbury City	2–1	Worthing
4	Chelmsford City	1–2	Harlow Town
5	Chippenham Town	1–0	Slough Town
6	Clevedon Town	2–3	Witney Town
7	Denaby United	0–1	Marine
8	Egham Town	0–0	Tooting & Mitcham United
9	Epsom & Ewell	4–5	Bognor Regis Town
10	Folkestone	1–0	Walthamstow Avenue
11	Formby	3–2	Chorley
12	Frome Town	3–1	Bath City
13	Gateshead	1–1	Blue Star
14	Gloucester City	1–3	Barry Town
15	Goole Town	4–2	Matlock Town
16	Gorleston	0–4	Aveley
17	Grays Athletic	2–1	Wealdstone
18	Gretna	0–2	Bishop Auckland
19	Hednesford Town	2–2	Witton Albion
20	Heybridge Swifts	0–0	Buckingham Town
21	Hungerford Town	3–3	Farnborough Town
22	Kidderminster Harriers	3–2	Bridgnorth Town
23	King's Lynn	0–0	Corby Town
24	Leatherhead	1–2	Hastings United
25	Merthyr Tydfil	4–1	Cheltenham Town
26	Metropolitan Police	3–1	Welling United
27	Nuneaton Borough	2–0	Gainsborough Trinity
28	Oswestry Town	1–1	Frickley Athletic
29	Oxford City	1–2	Moor Green
30	Ryhope Community Association	1–1	Whitby Town
31	Sittingbourne	1–1	Staines Town
32	South Bank	1–2	Tow Law Town
33	Stalybridge Celtic	5–0	Winsford United
34	Stourbridge	1–1	Halesowen Town
35	Tring Town	1–1	Fisher Athletic
36	Wembley	1–5	V S Rugby

=== Replays ===
Tie	Home team	Score	Away team
1	Alfreton Town	2–3	Burscough
8	Tooting & Mitcham United	1–0	Egham Town
13	Blue Star	3–1	Gateshead
19	Witton Albion	2–2	Hednesford Town
20	Buckingham Town	1–0	Heybridge Swifts
21	Farnborough Town	4–1	Hungerford Town
23	Corby Town	0–3	King's Lynn
28	Frickley Athletic	2–0	Oswestry Town
30	Whitby Town	5–1	Ryhope Community Association
31	Staines Town	3–0	Sittingbourne
34	Halesowen Town	3–4	Stourbridge
35	Fisher Athletic	5–0	Tring Town

=== 2nd replays ===
Tie	Home team	Score	Away team
19	Witton Albion	2–3	Hednesford Town

== 4th qualifying round ==
The teams given byes to this round were Maidstone United, Worcester City, Barnet, Scarborough, Enfield, Weymouth, Boston United, Dagenham, Kettering Town, Yeovil Town, Dartford, Wycombe Wanderers, Bishop's Stortford, Mossley, Workington, Barking, Penrith, Macclesfield Town, Harrow Borough and Windsor & Eton.

=== Ties ===
Tie	Home team	Score	Away team
1	Aveley	0–1	Dagenham
2	Barnet	3–1	Boston United
3	Bishop Auckland	1–2	Macclesfield Town
4	Bishop's Stortford	1–0	Maidstone United
5	Blue Star	0–0	Burscough
6	Bognor Regis Town	2–0	Frome Town
7	Buckingham Town	3–1	Barking
8	Canterbury City	0–1	Enfield
9	Farnborough Town	2–1	Chippenham Town
10	Folkestone	2–2	Fisher Athletic
11	Frickley Athletic	5–0	Moor Green
12	Grays Athletic	1–3	Dartford
13	Harlow Town	1–3	Metropolitan Police
14	Hastings United	1–1	Staines Town
15	Hednesford Town	0–4	Nuneaton Borough
16	Kettering Town	1–1	Harrow Borough
17	Kidderminster Harriers	1–1	King's Lynn
18	Marine	0–1	Whitby Town
19	Merthyr Tydfil	1–1	Barry Town
20	Mossley	0–1	Goole Town
21	Penrith	3–2	Formby
22	Stalybridge Celtic	1–0	Workington
23	Stourbridge	1–1	V S Rugby
24	Tow Law Town	1–0	Scarborough
25	Weymouth	3–1	Worcester City
26	Windsor & Eton	5–0	Tooting & Mitcham United
27	Wycombe Wanderers	1–1	Burton Albion
28	Yeovil Town	3–1	Witney Town

=== Replays ===
Tie	Home team	Score	Away team
5	Burscough	0–4	Blue Star
10	Fisher Athletic	2–0	Folkestone
14	Staines Town	2–1	Hastings United
16	Harrow Borough	0–2	Kettering Town
17	King's Lynn	1-0	Kidderminster Harriers
19	Barry Town	1–1	Merthyr Tydfil
23	V S Rugby	2–0	Stourbridge
27	Burton Albion	2–1	Wycombe Wanderers

=== 2nd replays ===
Tie	Home team	Score	Away team
19	Barry Town	3–2	Merthyr Tydfil

== 1984–85 FA Cup ==
See 1984-85 FA Cup for details of the rounds from the first round proper onwards.
