= John Jackson (footballer, born 1942) =

English footballer (1942–2022)

Personal information
- Full name: John Keith Jackson
- Date of birth: 5 September 1942
- Place of birth: Hammersmith, England
- Date of death: 29 December 2022 (aged 80)
- Position: Goalkeeper

Youth career
- Brentford
- Crystal Palace

Senior career*
Years	Team	Apps	(Gls)
1964–1973	Crystal Palace	346	(0)
1973–1979	Leyton Orient	226	(0)
1977	→ St. Louis Stars (loan)	17	(0)
1978	→ California Surf (loan)	13	(0)
1979–1981	Millwall	79	(0)
1981–1982	Ipswich Town	1	(0)
1982–1983	Hereford United	4	(0)
Total		686	(0)

International career
- England youth team
1971	The Football League XI	1	(0)
- * Club domestic league appearances and goals

John Keith Jackson (5 September 1942 – 29 December 2022) was an English footballer who made 656 appearances in the Football League playing as a goalkeeper for Crystal Palace, Leyton Orient, Millwall, Ipswich Town and Hereford United. He also played for St. Louis Stars and California Surf of the North American Soccer League.

== Career ==
Jackson was born in Hammersmith and began his career as a junior with Crystal Palace, signing from St Clement Danes School in March 1962. He also spent time with Brentford as a junior. He was initially understudy to Bill Glazier but when Glazier left in 1964, vied successfully for the goalkeeping position with Tony Millington. He then went on to make 222 consecutive appearances and was ever present in the 1968–69 season which saw Palace reach the top flight for the first time. In the club's subsequent four seasons in the top division Jackson missed only four games. After Palace were relegated in 1973, he moved to Leyton Orient, where he stayed for six years. After that, two years at Millwall was followed by a year with Ipswich, and Jackson finished his career with Hereford United, after 19 years as a goalkeeper. In 1983 he was signed by Brighton & Hove Albion as cover when they reached the FA Cup Final.

His one league appearance for Ipswich was in a high-pressure match against Manchester United, with Ipswich needing to win to stay in with a chance of winning the League Championship. Jackson received a standing ovation at the end of his first top flight match for seven years, having made three important saves in Town's 2–1 win. Ipswich manager Bobby Robson said: "We have paid him a year's salary to make those saves, but it was worth it!"

His nickname, reflecting the Palace supporters' respect for his safe hands, was "Stonewall", inspired by the Confederate general from the American Civil War.

== International career ==
Prior to signing for Crystal Palace Jackson had already won England youth team honours and in March 1971, represented the Football League against the Scottish League.

== Later life and death ==
After retiring from football Jackson had many jobs including working for a golf magazine, then selling golf equipment after which for a time he was goalkeeping coach for Brighton & Hove Albion F.C.; and most recently reported as working as a courier for Lewes (district) council.

Jackson died on 29 December 2022, at the age of 80.
