= Jimmy Wilde (footballer, born 1904) =

English footballer

Personal information
- Full name: Willam Charles Wilde
- Date of birth: 24 September 1904
- Place of birth: Lyndhurst, England
- Date of death: 18 June 1976 (aged 71)
- Height: 6 ft 0 in (1.83 m)
- Position: Defender

Senior career*
Years	Team	Apps	(Gls)
1928–1938	Crystal Palace	270	(5)
- * Club domestic league appearances and goals

William Charles Wilde (24 September 1904 – 18 June 1976), known as Jimmy Wilde, was an English professional footballer who played in the Football League, for Crystal Palace, as a defender.

== Early life ==
Wilde was born on 24 September 1904 in Lyndhurst, Hampshire and signed for Crystal Palace on 17 November 1928, after leaving the Army.

== Career ==
Wilde made his debut on 24 November 1928 in a home FA Cup tie 2–0 win against Kettering Town and his performance against Peter Simpson (later a Palace colleague), went a long way to ensuring his first team place in the future. Wilde remained at Palace for ten years and was a first team regular for eight seasons, six of them as captain, after which he continued to play regularly for the reserves, helping with the development of younger players, in particular Arthur Hudgell. Wilde made a total of 293 appearances for Crystal Palace. As of August 2014 this was still within the 20 highest player appearances for the club. He retired from playing in 1938, having made only three first team appearances over the previous two seasons.

== Personal life ==
Jimmy Wilde died on 18 June 1976, aged 71.
