= John Whibley =

English footballer

Personal information
- Full name: John Whibley
- Date of birth: 7 July 1891
- Place of birth: Sittingbourne, England
- Date of death: 1972 (aged 80–81)
- Position: Outside left

Youth career
- ?–1911: Sittingbourne

Senior career*
Years	Team	Apps	(Gls)
1911–1923	Crystal Palace	146	(27)
1923–?	Sittingbourne	?	(?)
- * Club domestic league appearances and goals

John Whibley (7 July 1891 – 1972) was an English professional footballer who played in both the Southern League and Football League for Crystal Palace, as an outside left. He also played non-league football for Sittingbourne.

== Playing career ==
Whibley was born in Sittingbourne, Kent and began his youth career with local club Sittingbourne F.C. He signed for Crystal Palace, then playing in the Southern League, in 1911, and over the following seasons, up until the outbreak of World War I, was a reserve player making only 20 appearances, scoring three times.

Whibley's career was then interrupted by military service, but he returned to play for Crystal Palace in the 1919–1920 season (35 appearances, nine goals). He made a total of 55 appearances in the Southern League scoring 12 goals.

In 1920, Crystal Palace became a founder member of the Third Division and Whibley made the transition to professional football. He became a regular in the side that won the inaugural Third Division title in 1920–21, making 32 appearances and scoring five times. Over the next two seasons Whibley made a further 59 appearances scoring 10 goals but towards the end of the 1922–23 season was no longer first choice outside-left and in May 1923, returned to Sittingbourne. He had made a total of 146 League appearances for Crystal Palace, scoring 27 goals.
