= 1993–94 Tottenham Hotspur F.C. season =

English football club season

Tottenham Hotspur F.C.
1993–94 season
- Chairman: Alan Sugar
- Manager: Osvaldo Ardiles
- Stadium: White Hart Lane
- FA Premier League: 15th
- FA Cup: Fourth round
- League Cup: Fifth round
- Top goalscorer: League: Teddy Sheringham (13); All: Teddy Sheringham (15)
- Average home league attendance: 27,160

The 1993–94 season was the 112th season in the history of Tottenham Hotspur Football Club, their 16th consecutive season in the top flight of English football and their second season in the FA Premier League. The club also participated in the FA Cup and the Football League Cup.

== Season summary ==
Tottenham Hotspur were full of excitement in the close season when, after the controversial dismissal of chief executive and former manager Terry Venables, former player Ossie Ardiles returned to the club as manager. He quickly set about bringing the glory days back to White Hart Lane by creating a new style of attacking football which regularly featured up to five players in the forward positions. Striker Teddy Sheringham was prolific once again, scoring 13 goals despite being restricted to just 19 league games due to injuries.

But the new regime failed to deliver, and Tottenham finished 15th in the final table. This dismal showing was hardly helped by Sheringham's injury problems, but the rest of the side failed to come close to Sheringham when it came to scoring goals. Defeats were all too frequent, with a seven-match losing run in mid-season being the longest succession of defeats endured by any Premier League team during the season.

This was soon to be the least of Tottenham's worries, as the Football Association announced that they were investigating financial irregularities which had occurred at the club during the 1980s under the chairmanship of Irving Scholar. The hammer blow was delivered when Tottenham were found guilty on all the charges and received the heaviest punishment ever imposed on an English club; they were fined £600,000 as well as having 12 league points deducted for the 1994–95 season and being banned from that season's FA Cup. Chairman Alan Sugar quickly appealed against the ruling, backing up his argument with the fact that the people responsible were no longer at the club.

A defiant Ardiles, fearful that the 12-point deduction might end up costing them their Premiership status, made a momentous transfer swoop for German striker Jürgen Klinsmann and Romanian midfielders Ilie Dumitrescu and Gheorghe Popescu.

== Season squad ==
Note: Flags indicate national team as defined under FIFA eligibility rules; some limited exceptions apply. Players may hold more than one non-FIFA nationality.

No.	Pos.	Nation	Player
1	GK	NOR	Erik Thorstvedt
2	DF	ENG	Dean Austin
3	DF	ENG	Justin Edinburgh
4	MF	ENG	Vinny Samways
5	DF	SCO	Colin Calderwood
6	DF	ENG	Gary Mabbutt (captain)
7	MF	ENG	Nick Barmby
8	DF	ENG	Kevin Scott
9	MF	ENG	Darren Anderton
10	FW	ENG	Teddy Sheringham
11	FW	ISR	Ronny Rosenthal
12	MF	ENG	Jason Dozzell
13	GK	ENG	Ian Walker
14	MF	ENG	Steve Sedgley
15	MF	ENG	David Howells
16	MF	ENG	Micky Hazard
17	MF	IRL	Andy Turner

No.	Pos.	Nation	Player
18	DF	ENG	Jason Cundy
19	MF	ENG	Kevin Watson
20	MF	ENG	Darren Caskey
21	MF	ENG	Danny Hill
22	DF	ENG	David Kerslake
23	DF	ENG	Sol Campbell
24	FW	ENG	Paul Moran
25	FW	SCO	John Hendry
26	DF	ENG	Stuart Nethercott
27	DF	IRL	Stephen Carr
28	MF	ENG	Lee Hodges
29	MF	NIR	Steve Robinson
30	GK	ENG	Chris Day
31	FW	ENG	Robert Simpson
32	FW	ENG	Paul Mahorn
33	MF	ENG	Andy Gray

Source: FootballSquads.co.uk

== Transfers and contracts ==
=== Released ===
Date from	Pos.	Nationality	Player	Subsequent club	Notes	Ref.
5 September 1993	DF	(England)	Terry Fenwick	(England) Swindon Town		
31 May 1994	FW	(England)	Paul Moran	(England) Peterborough United		

=== Loans out ===
Date from	Pos.	Nationality	Player	To	Date until	Ref.
1 May 1994	DF	(Iceland)	Guðni Bergsson	(Iceland) Valur	December 1994	

=== Transfers in ===
Date from	Pos.	Nationality	Player	From	Fee	Ref.
22 July 1993	DF	(Scotland)	Colin Calderwood	(England) Swindon Town	£1,250,000	
1 August 1993	MF	(England)	Jason Dozzell	(England) Ipswich Town	£1,900,000	
24 September 1993	DF	(England)	David Kerslake	(England) Leeds United	£450,000	
November 1993	MF	(England)	Micky Hazard	(England) Swindon Town	£50,000	
26 January 1994	FW	(Israel)	Ronny Rosenthal	(England) Liverpool	£250,000	
1 February 1994	DF	(England)	Kevin Scott	(England) Newcastle United	£850,000	

=== Transfers out ===
Date from	Pos.	Nationality	Player	To	Fee	Ref.
31 May 1993	MF	(Spain)	Nayim	(Spain) Real Zaragoza	£500,000	
22 July 1993	DF	(England)	Neil Ruddock	(England) Liverpool	£2,500,000	
1 August 1993	DF	(England)	David Tuttle	(England) Sheffield United	£350,000	
10 August 1993	MF	(England)	Scott Houghton	(England) Luton Town	Free	
9 September 1993	DF	(Wales)	Pat Van Den Hauwe	(England) Millwall	Free	
16 September 1993	MF	(England)	Paul Allen	(England) Southampton	£550,000	
24 November 1993	FW	(Scotland)	Gordon Durie	(Scotland) Rangers	£1,200,000	

== Pre-season and friendlies ==
During the pre-season Tottenham hosted The Makita International Soccer Tournament.

Win Draw Loss Fixtures

31 July 1993 Semi-final	Tottenham Hotspur	3–2	Lazio	Tottenham, London
				Stadium: White Hart Lane

31 July 1993 Final	Chelsea	4–0	Tottenham Hotspur	Tottenham, London
	Cascarino 13', 32', 51'; Peacock 38'			Stadium: White Hart Lane

== Competitions ==
=== Premier League ===
==== League Table ====
Pos	Team	Pld	W	D	L	GF	GA	GD	Pts	Qualification or relegation
13	West Ham United	42	13	13	16	47	58	−11	52	
14	Chelsea	42	13	12	17	49	53	−4	51	Qualification for the Cup Winners' Cup first round (Note: Chelsea qualified for the Cup Winners' Cup as FA Cup runners-up, as winners Manchester United qualified for the Champions League.)
15	Tottenham Hotspur	42	11	12	19	54	59	−5	45	
16	Manchester City	42	9	18	15	38	49	−11	45	
17	Everton	42	12	8	22	42	63	−21	44	

Source: Premier League
Rules for classification: 1) points; 2) goal difference; 3) number of goals scored.

==== Results Summary ====
Overall								Home						Away					
Pld	W	D	L	GF	GA	GD	Pts	W	D	L	GF	GA	GD	W	D	L	GF	GA	GD
42	11	12	19	54	59	−5	45	4	8	9	29	33	−4	7	4	10	25	26	−1

==== Matches ====
14 August 1993 1	Newcastle United	0–1	Tottenham Hotspur	Newcastle upon Tyne
15:00 BST	Venison (yellow card)	Report	Sheringham 36'	Stadium: St James' Park; Attendance: 35,216; Referee: David Allison

16 August 1993 2	Tottenham Hotspur	0–1	Arsenal	Tottenham
20:00 BST	Austin (yellow card); Mabbutt (yellow card); Samways (yellow card)	Report	Wright 87', (yellow card); Keown (yellow card); Parlour (yellow card)	Stadium: White Hart Lane; Attendance: 28,355; Referee: David Elleray

21 August 1993 3	Tottenham Hotspur	1–0	Manchester City	Tottenham
15:00 BST	Sedgley 68'	Report		Stadium: White Hart Lane; Attendance: 24,535; Referee: Keith Hackett

25 August 1993 4	Liverpool	1–2	Tottenham Hotspur	Liverpool
19:45 BST	Clough 18'	Report	Sheringham 30' (pen.), 42'	Stadium: Anfield; Attendance: 42,456; Referee: Keren Barratt

28 August 1993 5	Aston Villa	1–0	Tottenham Hotspur	Birmingham
15:00 BST	Staunton 71' (pen.), (yellow card)	Report	Sheringham (yellow card)	Stadium: Villa Park; Attendance: 32,498; Referee: Keith Cooper

1 September 1993 6	Tottenham Hotspur	1–1	Chelsea	Tottenham
19:45 BST	Sheringham 85' (pen.)	Report	Cascarino 23'	Stadium: White Hart Lane; Attendance: 27,567; Referee: Vic Callow

11 September 1993 7	Sheffield United	2–2	Tottenham Hotspur	Sheffield
15:00 BST	Littlejohn 47', 62'	Report	Sheringham 15', 51'; Dozzell (yellow card)	Stadium: Bramall Lane; Attendance: 21,325; Referee: Kelvin Morton

18 September 1993 8	Tottenham Hotspur	5–0	Oldham Athletic	Tottenham
15:00 BST	Sedgley 5', 7'; Sheringham 6'; Durie 62'; Dozzell 86'	Report		Stadium: White Hart Lane; Attendance: 24,613; Referee: Allan Gunn

26 September 1993 9	Ipswich Town	2–2	Tottenham Hotspur	Ipswich
16:00 BST	Milton 58'; Marshall 80'	Report	Sheringham 28'; Calderwood (red card) 63'; Dozzell 87'	Stadium: Portman Road; Attendance: 19,411; Referee: Gerald Ashby

3 October 1993 10	Tottenham Hotspur	3–2	Everton	Tottenham
16:00 BST	Sheringham 58'; Anderton 88'; Caskey 90', (yellow card)	Report	Rideout 16'; Cottee 67' (pen.); Jackson (yellow card); Ward (yellow card)	Stadium: White Hart Lane; Attendance: 27,487; Referee: Roger Milford

16 October 1993 11	Manchester United	2–1	Tottenham Hotspur	Trafford
15:00 BST	Keane 65'; Sharpe 70'	Report	Caskey 73', (yellow card)	Stadium: Old Trafford; Attendance: 44,655; Referee: Keith Burge

23 October 1993 12	Tottenham Hotspur	1–1	Swindon Town	Tottenham
15:00 BST	Dozzell 51'; Samways (yellow card)	Report	Ling (yellow card) 62'; Bodin 64' (pen.); Åge Fjørtoft (yellow card); Mutch (yellow card)	Stadium: White Hart Lane; Attendance: 31,304; Referee: Keren Barratt

30 October 1993 13	Blackburn Rovers	1–0	Tottenham Hotspur	Blackburn
15:00 GMT	Shearer 15'	Report		Stadium: Ewood Park; Attendance: 16,849; Referee: Alan Wilkie

6 November 1993 14	Southampton	1–0	Tottenham Hotspur	Southampton
15:00 GMT	Maddison 60'; Allen (yellow card)	Report	Edinburgh (yellow card)	Stadium: The Dell; Attendance: 16,017; Referee: David Allison

20 November 1993 15	Tottenham Hotspur	1–1	Leeds United	Tottenham
15:00 GMT	Anderton 81'	Report	Deane 53'; Pemberton (yellow card)	Stadium: White Hart Lane; Attendance: 31,275; Referee: Joe Worrall

24 November 1993 16	Tottenham Hotspur	1–1	Wimbledon	Tottenham
	Barmby 6'	Report	Holdsworth 72'; Barton (yellow card); Jones (yellow card)	Stadium: White Hart Lane; Attendance: 17,744; Referee: Keith Hackett

27 November 1993 17	Queens Park Rangers	1–1	Tottenham Hotspur	Shepherd's Bush
15:00 GMT	Ferdinand 2'; Holloway (yellow card)	Report	Anderton 87'; Campbell (yellow card)	Stadium: Loftus Road; Attendance: 17,694; Referee: David Elleray

4 December 1993 18	Tottenham Hotspur	1–2	Newcastle United	Tottenham
15:00 GMT	Barmby 61' (pen.)	Report	Beardsley 55', 90'; Jeffrey (yellow card) 89'	Stadium: Tottenham Hotspur Stadium; Attendance: 30,780; Referee: Mike Reed

6 December 1993 19	Arsenal	1–1	Tottenham Hotspur	Holloway
20:00 GMT	Wright 66'; Selley (yellow card)	Report	Anderton 25'; Hazard (yellow card); Samways (yellow card)	Stadium: Highbury; Attendance: 35,669; Referee: Philip Don

11 December 1993 20	Manchester City	0–2	Tottenham Hotspur	Manchester
15:00 GMT	Quigley (yellow card) 67'; Flitcroft (yellow card)	Report	Dozzell 64', 88'; Samways (yellow card)	Stadium: Maine Road; Attendance: 21,566; Referee: Graham Poll

18 December 1993 21	Tottenham Hotspur	3–3	Liverpool	Tottenham
15:00 GMT	Samways 37'; Hazard 69' (pen.); Caskey 77'; Edinburgh (yellow card)	Report	Fowler 49', 54' (pen.); Redknapp 52'; Harkness (yellow card)	Stadium: White Hart Lane; Attendance: 31,394; Referee: Robbie Hart

27 December 1993 22	Tottenham Hotspur	1–3	Norwich City	Tottenham
15:00 GMT	Barmby 74'; Sedgley (yellow card)	Report	Sutton 27', 90'; Ekoku 36', (yellow card)	Stadium: White Hart Lane; Attendance: 33,130; Referee: Allan Gunn

28 December 1993 23	West Ham United	1–3	Tottenham Hotspur	Upton Park
15:00 GMT	Holmes 11'; Butler (yellow card)	Report	Dozzell 34'; Hazard 42'; Anderton 77'; Calderwood (yellow card); Edinburgh (yellow card)	Stadium: Boleyn Ground; Attendance: 20,787; Referee: Gerald Ashby

1 January 1994 24	Tottenham Hotspur	1–2	Coventry City	Tottenham
15:00 GMT	Caskey 43'	Report	Babb 25'; Wegerle 77'	Stadium: White Hart Lane; Attendance: 26,015; Referee: Terry Holbrook

3 January 1994 25	Sheffield Wednesday	1–0	Tottenham Hotspur	Sheffield
15:00 GMT	Bright 5'	Report		Stadium: Hillsborough Stadium; Attendance: 32,514; Referee: Keith Burge

15 January 1994 26	Tottenham Hotspur	0–1	Manchester United	Tottenham
15:00 GMT	Calderwood (yellow card)	Report	Hughes 49'	Stadium: White Hart Lane; Attendance: 31,343; Referee: Roger Milford

22 January 1994 27	Swindon Town	2–1	Tottenham Hotspur	Swindon
15:00 GMT	Åge Fjørtoft 38'; Ling (yellow card) 61'; Whitbread 80'; Kilcline (yellow card)	Report	Barmby 30'; Austin (yellow card); Edinburgh (yellow card)	Stadium: County Ground; Attendance: 16,563; Referee: Paul Durkin

5 February 1994 28	Tottenham Hotspur	1–3	Sheffield Wednesday	Tottenham
15:00 GMT	Rosenthal 66'; Samways (yellow card)	Report	Coleman 17'; Bright 54', 62'; Hyde (yellow card); Nilsson (yellow card)	Stadium: White Hart Lane; Attendance: 23,078; Referee: David Frampton

12 February 1994 29	Tottenham Hotspur	0–2	Blackburn Rovers	Tottenham
15:00 GMT	Samways (yellow card)	Report	Shearer 61', (yellow card); Gallacher 72', (yellow card); Ripley (yellow card)	Stadium: White Hart Lane; Attendance: 30,236; Referee: Jim Borrett

27 February 1994 30	Chelsea	4–3	Tottenham Hotspur	Fulham
15:00 GMT	Donaghy 29'; Stein 33', 90' (pen.); Spencer 40', (yellow card)	Report	Sedgley 17'; Dozzell 18'; Gray 73' (pen.)	Stadium: Stamford Bridge; Attendance: 16,807; Referee: John Lloyd

2 March 1994 31	Tottenham Hotspur	1–1	Aston Villa	Tottenham
19:45 GMT	Rosenthal 74'	Report	Parker 9'	Stadium: White Hart Lane; Attendance: 17,452; Referee: Kelvin Morton

5 March 1994 32	Tottenham Hotspur	2–2	Sheffield United	Tottenham
15:00 GMT	Scott 64'; Dozzell 90'	Report	Gaye 57'; Blake 86'	Stadium: White Hart Lane; Attendance: 25,741; Referee: David Allison

19 March 1994 33	Tottenham Hotspur	1–1	Ipswich Town	Tottenham
15:00 GMT	Barmby 56'; Scott (yellow card)	Report	Kiwomya 12', (yellow card)	Stadium: White Hart Lane; Attendance: 26,653; Referee: Gerald Ashby

26 March 1994 34	Everton	0–1	Tottenham Hotspur	Liverpool
15:00 GMT		Report	Sedgley 70'	Stadium: Goodison Park; Attendance: 23,580; Referee: Gary Willard

2 April 1994 35	Norwich City	1–2	Tottenham Hotspur	Norwich
15:00 BST	Sutton 71'	Report	Sheringham 56'; Woodthorpe 76' (o.g.); Samways (yellow card)	Stadium: Carrow Road; Attendance: 21,181; Referee: Alan Wilkie

4 April 1994 36	Tottenham Hotspur	1–4	West Ham United	Tottenham
15:00 BST	Sheringham 66' (pen.)	Report	Jones 38'; Morley 60' (pen.), 73'; Marsh 80'; Gale (yellow card); Rush (yellow card)	Stadium: White Hart Lane; Attendance: 31,502; Referee: Philip Don

9 April 1994 37	Coventry City	1–0	Tottenham Hotspur	Coventry
15:00 BST	Ndlovu 62' (pen.); Flynn (yellow card)	Report		Stadium: Highfield Road; Attendance: 13,391; Referee: Mike Reed

17 April 1994 38	Leeds United	2–0	Tottenham Hotspur	Leeds
16:00 BST	Wallace 61', 89'	Report		Stadium: Elland Road; Attendance: 33,658; Referee: Roger Milford

23 April 1994 39	Tottenham Hotspur	3–0	Southampton	Tottenham
15:00 BST	Sedgley 5'; Samways 67'; Anderton 89'; Edinburgh (yellow card)	Report		Stadium: White Hart Lane; Attendance: 25,959; Referee: Paul Durkin

30 April 1994 40	Wimbledon	2–1	Tottenham Hotspur	Selhurst
15:00 BST	Holdsworth 58'; Clarke 63'	Report	Sheringham 72' (pen.)	Stadium: Selhurst Park; Attendance: 20,875; Referee: David Allison

5 May 1994 41	Oldham Athletic	0–2	Tottenham Hotspur	Oldham
19:45 BST	Henry (yellow card)	Report	Samways 37'; David Howells 78'; Sheringham (yellow card)	Stadium: Boundary Park; Attendance: 14,283; Referee: Rodger Gifford

7 May 1994 42	Tottenham Hotspur	1–2	Queens Park Rangers	Tottenham
15:00 BST	Sheringham 39'	Report	Sinclair 36', 77'	Stadium: White Hart Lane; Attendance: 26,105; Referee: Allan Gunn

=== FA Cup ===
8 January 1994 Third round	Peterborough United	1–1	Tottenham Hotspur	Peterborough
15:00 GMT	Brissett 62'		Dozzell 85'	Stadium: London Road; Attendance: 19,169; Referee: Ray Bigger

19 January 1994 Third round replay	Tottenham Hotspur	1–1 (a.e.t.) (5–4 p)	Peterborough United	Tottenham
19:45 GMT	Barmby 12'		Charlery 24'	Stadium: White Hart Lane; Attendance: 24,893; Referee: Graham Poll
	Penalties
	Caskey (penalty scored); Kerslake (penalty scored); Anderton (penalty scored); Barmby (penalty scored); Sedgley (penalty scored)		Adcock (penalty scored); Charlery (penalty scored); Kruszyński (penalty scored); Furnell (penalty missed); Greenman (penalty scored)

29 January 1994 Fourth round	Ipswich Town	3–0	Tottenham Hotspur	Ipswich
15:00 GMT	Marshall 53'; Johnson 64'; Thompson 85'			Stadium: Portman Road; Attendance: 22,539; Referee: Dermot Gallagher

=== League Cup ===
22 September 1993 Second round First leg	Burnley	0–0	Tottenham Hotspur	Burnley
19:30 BST				Stadium: Turf Moor; Attendance: 16,844; Referee: Brian Coddington

11 October 1988 Second round Second leg	Tottenham Hotspur	3–1 (3–1 agg.)	Burnley	Tottenham
	Sheringham 3', 90'; Caskey (red card) 63'; Howells 75'		Eyres 7'	Stadium: White Hart Lane; Attendance: 20,614; Referee: Ray Bigger

27 October 1993 Third round	Derby County	0–1	Tottenham Hotspur	Derby
19:45 GMT			Barmby 71'	Stadium: Baseball Ground; Attendance: 17,593; Referee: Brian Hill

1 December 1993 Fourth round	Tottenham Hotspur	1–0	Blackburn Rovers	Tottenham
19:45 GMT	Campbell 64'			Stadium: White Hart Lane; Attendance: 22,295; Referee: Roger Milford

12 January 1994 Fifth round	Tottenham Hotspur	1–2	Aston Villa	Tottenham
19:45 GMT	Caskey 63'		Houghton 56'; Barrett 68'	Stadium: White Hart Lane; Attendance: 31,408; Referee: Terry Holbrook

== Statistics ==
=== Appearances and goals ===
No.	Pos	Nat	Player	Total		Premier League		FA Cup		League Cup	
No.	Pos	Nat	Player	Apps	Goals	Apps	Goals	Apps	Goals	Apps	Goals
Goalkeepers
1	GK	(Norway) NOR	Erik Thorstvedt	37	0	32	0	1	0	4	0
13	GK	(England) ENG	Ian Walker	14	0	10+1	0	2	0	1	0
Defenders
2	DF	(England) ENG	Dean Austin	26	0	20+3	0	2	0	0+1	0
3	DF	(England) ENG	Justin Edinburgh	31	0	24+1	0	3	0	3	0
5	DF	(Scotland) SCO	Colin Calderwood	34	0	26	0	3	0	5	0
6	DF	(England) ENG	Gary Mabbutt	32	0	29	0	0	0	3	0
8	DF	(England) ENG	Kevin Scott	12	1	12	1	0	0	0	0
22	DF	(England) ENG	David Kerslake	23	0	16+1	0	1+1	0	4	0
23	DF	(England) ENG	Sol Campbell	41	1	27+7	0	1+2	0	4	1
26	DF	(England) ENG	Stuart Nethercott	12	0	9+1	0	1	0	1	0
27	DF	(Republic of Ireland) IRL	Stephen Carr	1	0	1	0	0	0	0	0
Midfielders
4	MF	(England) ENG	Vinny Samways	47	3	39	3	3	0	5	0
7	MF	(England) ENG	Nick Barmby	33	7	27	5	3	1	3	1
9	MF	(England) ENG	Darren Anderton	45	6	35+2	6	3	0	5	0
12	MF	(England) ENG	Jason Dozzell	38	10	28+4	9	2	1	4	0
14	MF	(England) ENG	Steve Sedgley	49	5	42	5	3	0	4	0
15	MF	(England) ENG	David Howells	20	2	15+3	1	0	0	1+1	1
16	MF	(England) ENG	Micky Hazard	19	2	13+4	2	2	0	0	0
17	MF	(Republic of Ireland) IRL	Andy Turner	1	0	0+1	0	0	0	0	0
20	MF	(England) ENG	Darren Caskey	32	5	16+9	4	3	0	3+1	1
21	MF	(England) ENG	Danny Hill	3	0	1+2	0	0	0	0	0
29	MF	(Northern Ireland) NIR	Steve Robinson	2	0	1+1	0	0	0	0	0
33	MF	(England) ENG	Andy Gray	2	1	0+2	1	0	0	0	0
Forwards
10	FW	(England) ENG	Teddy Sheringham	21	15	17+2	13	0	0	2	2
11	FW	(Israel) ISR	Ronny Rosenthal	16	2	11+4	2	0	0	1	0
24	FW	(England) ENG	Paul Moran	6	0	0+5	0	0	0	0+1	0
25	FW	(Scotland) SCO	John Hendry	5	0	0+3	0	0+1	0	0+1	0
32	FW	(England) ENG	Paul Mahorn	1	0	1	0	0	0	0	0
Players transferred out during the season
8	MF	(Scotland) SCO	Gordon Durie	12	1	10	1	0	0	2	0
11	MF	(England) ENG	Paul Allen	1	0	0+1	0	0	0	0	0

Last updated: 15 May 1999
Source: [[]]

=== Goal scorers ===
Last updated: 26 July 2020.
Source: premierleague.com

The list is sorted by shirt number when total goals are equal.

Rnk	Pos	No.	Player	Premier League	FA Cup	EFL Cup	Total
1	FW	10	(England) Teddy Sheringham	13	0	2	15
2	MF	12	(England) Jason Dozzell	9	1	0	10
3	MF	7	(England) Nick Barmby	5	1	1	7
4	MF	9	(England) Darren Anderton	6	0	0	6
5	MF	14	(England) Steve Sedgley	5	0	0	5
5	MF	20	(England) Darren Caskey	4	0	1	5
7	MF	4	(England) Vinny Samways	3	0	0	3
8	FW	11	(Israel) Ronny Rosenthal	2	0	0	2
8	MF	15	(England) David Howells	1	0	1	2
8	MF	16	(England) Micky Hazard	2	0	0	2
11	FW	8	(Scotland) Gordon Durie	1	0	0	1
11	DF	8	(England) Kevin Scott	1	0	0	1
11	DF	23	(England) Sol Campbell	0	0	1	1
11	MF	33	(England) Andy Gray	1	0	0	1
TOTALS				53	2	6	61

=== Clean sheets ===
Last updated: 26 July 2020.
Source: premierleague.com

Rnk	No.	Player	Premier League	FA Cup	EFL Cup	Total
1	1	(Norway) Erik Thorstvedt	7	0	2	9
2	13	(England) Ian Walker	1	0	1	2
TOTALS			8	0	3	11
