= 1990–91 Tottenham Hotspur F.C. season =

English football club season

Tottenham Hotspur
1990–91 season
- Chairman: Irving Scholar
- Manager: Terry Venables
- Stadium: White Hart Lane
- First Division: 10th
- FA Cup: Winners
- League Cup: Quarter-final
- Top goalscorer: League: Gary Lineker (13); All: Gary Lineker; Paul Gascoigne (19 each)
Home colours	Away colours

The 1990–91 season is the 109th season in existence of Tottenham Hotspur Football Club, and their 13th consecutive season in the top flight of English football. In addition to the domestic league, the club participated in the FA Cup and the Football League Cup. Entering the 1990–91 season, Terry Venables stayed on as manager for his fourth season in charge of Tottenham with the team ending in tenth position. They won a record eighth FA Cup, beating Nottingham Forest in the final and they got knocked out in the quarter-finals of the Football League Cup by Chelsea.

== Season summary ==
Tottenham's league form was average at best: having stood in third place after 17 games, the club won only three of their next 21 league matches, slumping to tenth place in the final table. The club had better luck in the FA Cup: after defeating London arch-rivals (and that season's eventual champions) Arsenal in the semi-final, they defeated Nottingham Forest 2–1 in the final. As well as giving Tottenham their first post-Heysel European campaign (in the Cup Winners' Cup) and ending the club's seven-year trophy drought, the FA Cup win made Tottenham the first club to win the trophy eight times, although this record has since been surpassed by Arsenal and Manchester United.

The only downside of the FA Cup triumph was an injury to star midfielder Paul Gascoigne, who ruptured his cruciate ligaments in a tackle on Forest fullback Gary Charles early in the first half. The injury would put his transfer to Italian side Lazio on hold until the 1992–93 season. Gascoigne had earlier scored a tremendous free-kick in the 3–1 win against Arsenal in the semi-final (Gary Lineker scored Tottenham's other goals, with Arsenal's Alan Smith scoring Arsenal's goal).

Off the pitch the club were in danger of going into administration. With £20 million of debt (around £45 million equivalent in 2020) and shares in Tottenham Hotspur being suspended in the autumn of 1990, Irving Scholar resigned as chairman of the club. In June 1991, manager Terry Venables and businessman, Alan Sugar, took over the club with equal shares and Alan Sugar being made chairman.

== Squad ==
Squad at end of season

=== First-team squad ===
Note: Flags indicate national team as defined under FIFA eligibility rules; some limited exceptions apply. Players may hold more than one non-FIFA nationality.

Pos.	Nation	Player
GK	ENG	Kevin Dearden
GK	ENG	Ian Walker
GK	NOR	Erik Thorstvedt
DF	ENG	Justin Edinburgh
DF	ENG	Ian Hendon
DF	ENG	Terry Fenwick
DF	ENG	Gary Mabbutt (captain)
DF	ENG	Mitchell Thomas
DF	ENG	Dave Tuttle
DF	WAL	Pat Van Den Hauwe
DF	IRL	David McDonald
DF	ISL	Guðni Bergsson
MF	ENG	Paul Allen
MF	ENG	Peter Garland
MF	ENG	Paul Gascoigne

Pos.	Nation	Player
MF	ENG	Danny Hill
MF	ENG	Scott Houghton
MF	ENG	David Howells
MF	ENG	John Moncur
MF	ENG	Vinny Samways
MF	ENG	Mark Robson
MF	ENG	Steve Sedgley
MF	ENG	Paul Stewart
MF	ESP	Nayim
FW	ENG	Gary Lineker
FW	ENG	Paul Moran
FW	ENG	Paul Walsh
FW	SCO	John Hendry
FW	NIR	Phil Gray

=== Reserve squad ===
Note: Flags indicate national team as defined under FIFA eligibility rules; some limited exceptions apply. Players may hold more than one non-FIFA nationality.

Pos.	Nation	Player
DF	ENG	Neil Smith
MF	ENG	Nick Barmby

Pos.	Nation	Player
FW	ENG	Ollie Morah

== Transfers ==
=== Loans out ===
Date from	Position	Nationality	Player	To	Date until	Ref.
24 August 1990	GK	(England)	Kevin Dearden	(England) Peterborough United	24 October 1990	
31 August 1990	GK	(England)	Ian Walker	(England) Oxford United	15 November 1990	
27 September 1990	DF	(Republic of Ireland)	David McDonald	(England) Gillingham	31 May 1991	
25 October 1990	DF	(England)	Terry Fenwick	(England) Leicester City	24 December 1990	
16 November 1990	GK	(England)	Ian Walker	(England) Ipswich Town	May 1991	
November 1990	FW	(Northern Ireland)	Phil Gray	(England) Fulham	December 1990	
November 1990	DF	(Republic of Ireland)	Chris Hughton	(England) West Ham United	December 1990	
10 January 1991	GK	(England)	Kevin Dearden	(England) Hull City	10 February 1991	
28 March 1991	DF	(England)	Brian Statham	(England) Reading	1 July 1991	

=== Transfers in ===
Date from	Position	Nationality	Name	From	Fee	Ref.
1 July 1990	DF	(England)	Justin Edinburgh	(England) Southend United	£150,000	
31 July 1990	FW	(Scotland)	John Hendry	(Scotland) Dundee	£50,000	

=== Transfers out ===
Date from	Position	Nationality	Name	To	Fee	Ref.
24 July 1990	DF	(England)	John Polston	(England) Norwich City	£300,000	
28 September 1990	DF	(England)	Guy Butters	(England) Portsmouth	£375,000	
22 December 1990	GK	(England)	Bobby Mimms	(England) Blackburn Rovers	£250,000	
31 December 1990	DF	(Republic of Ireland)	Chris Hughton	(England) West Ham United	Free transfer	

=== Overall transfer activity ===
==== Expenditure ====
Total: ▼£200,000

==== Income ====
Total: ▲£925,000

==== Net totals ====
Total: ▲£725,000

== Kit ==
The FA Cup final saw Tottenham debut a longer style of shorts as part of their kit. Although the long shorts were ridiculed at first, within the decade all clubs in English football would have adopted the style.

== Pre-season and friendlies ==
=== Pre-season ===
27 July 1990 Friendly	Tottenham Hotspur (England)	3–0	(England) Ipswich Town	Barnet
	Nayim; Allen; Stewart			Stadium: Chase Lodge

30 July 1990 Friendly	Tottenham Hotspur (England)	0–1	(England) Maidstone United	Barnet
			Goal	Stadium: Chase Lodge

1 August 1990 Tour	Shelbourne (Republic of Ireland)	0–3	(England) Tottenham Hotspur	Dublin, Ireland
			Gascoigne; Lineker	Stadium: Tolka Park

3 August 1990 Tour	Derry City (Northern Ireland)	0–3	(England) Tottenham Hotspur	Derry, Northern Ireland
19:30 BST			Stewart (penalty missed); Lineker	Stadium: Brandywell Stadium

7 August 1990 Tour	SK Brann (Norway)	0–1	(England) Tottenham Hotspur	Bergen, Norway
			Howells	Stadium: Brann Stadion; Attendance: 3,791

9 August 1990 Tour	Viking FK (Norway)	1–1	(England) Tottenham Hotspur	Stavanger, Norway
	Goal		Walsh	Stadium: Stavanger Stadion; Attendance: 7,151

11 August 1990 Tour	Sogndal (Norway)	0–1	(England) Tottenham Hotspur	Sogndalsfjøra, Norway
			Moran	Stadium: Fosshaugane Stadion; Attendance: 2,804

13 August 1990 Tour	Heart of Midlothian (Scotland)	1–1	(England) Tottenham Hotspur	Edinburgh, Scotland
19:30 BST	Foster		Howells	Stadium: Tynecastle Park; Attendance: 18,433

17 August 1990 Friendly	Tottenham Hotspur (England)	4–1	(England) West Ham United	Tottenham
19:45 BST	Lineker (pen.); Gascoigne; Nayim		Goal	Stadium: White Hart Lane; Attendance: 17,456; Referee: Tony Ward
Note: Ray Clemence benefit match

20 August 1990 Friendly	Southend United (England)	1–4	(England) Tottenham Hotspur	Southend-on-Sea
	Goal		Walsh; Stewart; Samways; (o.g.)	Stadium: Roots Hall

=== Mid-season ===
13 October 1990 Friendly	Arsenal (England)	2–5	(England) Tottenham Hotspur	Holloway
15:00 BST	Goal		Stewart; Samways; (o.g.)	Stadium: Highbury; Attendance: 14,806
Note: Graham Rix Testimonial match

12 November 1990 Friendly	West Ham United (England)	4–3	(England) Tottenham Hotspur	London
	Goal		Stewart; Houghton	Stadium: Boleyn Ground; Attendance: 10,443

=== Post-season ===
==== Kirin Cup Soccer tournament ====
2 June 1991 Friendly	Tottenham Hotspur (England)	0–0	(Brazil) Vasco	Japan
				Attendance: 15,000

5 June 1991 Friendly	Thailand XI	1–2	(England) Tottenham Hotspur	Nagoya, Japan
	Viton		Hendry; Edwards	Stadium: Mizuho Athletic Stadium; Attendance: 25,000

9 June 1991 Friendly	Japan XI	4–0	(England) Tottenham Hotspur	Tokyo, Japan
	Kitazawa 2'; Miura 8', 41'; Sakakura 66'			Stadium: National Stadium; Attendance: 45,000

== Competitions ==
=== Overview ===
Competition	First match	Last match	Starting round	Final position	Record							
Competition	First match	Last match	Starting round	Final position	Pld	W	D	L	GF	GA	GD	Win %
First Division	25 August 1990	20 May 1991	Matchday 1	10th	38	11	16	11	51	50	+1	28.95
FA Cup	5 January 1991	18 May 1991	Third round	Winners	6	6	0	0	14	6	+8	100.00
League Cup	26 September 1990	23 January 1991	Second round	Quarter-finals	6	4	1	1	11	5	+6	66.67
Total					50	21	17	12	76	61	+15	42.00

Source: Competitions

=== First Division ===
==== League table ====
Pos	Team	Pld	W	D	L	GF	GA	GD	Pts	Qualification or relegation
8	Nottingham Forest	38	14	12	12	65	50	+15	54	
9	Everton	38	13	12	13	50	46	+4	51	
10	Tottenham Hotspur	38	11	16	11	51	50	+1	49	Qualification for the Cup Winners' Cup qualifying round
11	Chelsea	38	13	10	15	58	69	−11	49	
12	Queens Park Rangers	38	12	10	16	44	53	−9	46	

Source: World Football
Rules for classification: 1) Points; 2) Goal difference; 3) Goals scored

==== Results summary ====
Overall								Home						Away					
Pld	W	D	L	GF	GA	GD	Pts	W	D	L	GF	GA	GD	W	D	L	GF	GA	GD
38	11	16	11	51	50	+1	49	8	9	2	35	22	+13	3	7	9	16	28	−12

==== Results by matchday ====
Matchday	1	2	3	4	5	6	7	8	9	10	11	12	13	14	15	16	17	18	19	20	21	22	23	24	25	26	27	28	29	30	31	32	33	34	35	36	37	38
Ground	H	A	A	H	A	H	H	A	H	A	H	H	A	H	A	H	A	H	A	A	H	H	A	H	A	H	A	H	H	A	H	A	A	A	H	H	A	A
Result	W	D	D	W	W	D	W	D	W	W	L	W	D	W	L	D	L	W	L	L	L	D	W	D	L	D	L	D	D	D	W	L	L	D	D	D	L	D
Position	3	3	6	3	3	3	3	3	3	3	3	3	3	3	4	3	4	4	5	5	6	6	6	6	7	7	8	8	9	10	10	9	9	8	9	9	10	10
Points	3	4	5	8	11	12	15	16	19	22	22	25	26	29	29	30	30	33	33	33	33	34	37	38	38	39	39	40	41	42	45	45	45	46	47	48	48	49

A = Away; H = Home; W = Win; D = Draw; L = Loss

==== Matches ====
25 August 1990 1	Tottenham Hotspur	3–1	Manchester City	Tottenham
15:00 BST	Lineker 2', 55'; Gascoigne 65'	Report	Quinn 6'	Stadium: White Hart Lane; Attendance: 33,501; Referee: John Martin

28 August 1990 2	Sunderland	0–0	Tottenham Hotspur	Sunderland
		Report		Stadium: Roker Park; Attendance: 30,214; Referee: Trevor Simpson

1 September 1990 3	Arsenal	0–0	Tottenham Hotspur	Holloway
15:00 BST		Report		Stadium: Highbury; Attendance: 40,009; Referee: Joseph Worrall

8 September 1990 4	Tottenham Hotspur	3–0	Derby County	Tottenham
15:00 BST	Gascoigne 13', 70', 88'	Report		Stadium: White Hart Lane; Attendance: 29,614; Referee: Paul Durkin

15 September 1990 5	Leeds United	0–2	Tottenham Hotspur	Leeds
		Report	Howells 56'; Lineker 58'	Stadium: Elland Road; Attendance: 31,342; Referee: Robert Hart

22 September 1990 6	Tottenham Hotspur	1–1	Crystal Palace	Tottenham
15:00 BST	Gascoigne 42'	Report	Thomas 80'	Stadium: White Hart Lane; Attendance: 34,859; Referee: David Axcell

29 September 1990 7	Tottenham Hotspur	2–1	Aston Villa	Tottenham
15:00 BST	Lineker 44'; Allen 81'	Report	Platt 33'	Stadium: White Hart Lane; Attendance: 34,939; Referee: Bob Hamer

6 October 1990 8	Queens Park Rangers	0–0	Tottenham Hotspur	Shepherd's Bush
15:00 BST		Report		Stadium: Loftus Road; Attendance: 21,405; Referee: Mick Pierce

20 October 1990 9	Tottenham Hotspur	4–0	Sheffield United	Tottenham
15:00 BST	Walsh 50', 78', 89'; Nayim 65'	Report		Stadium: White Hart Lane; Attendance: 34,612; Referee: Martin Bodenham

27 October 1990 10	Nottingham Forest	1–2	Tottenham Hotspur	Nottingham
15:00 BST	Clough 16'	Report	Howells 68', 90'	Stadium: City Ground; Attendance: 27,347; Referee: Neil Midgley

4 November 1990 11	Tottenham Hotspur	1–3	Liverpool	Tottenham
15:00 GMT	Lineker 50'	Report	Rush 38', 48'; Beardsley 67'	Stadium: White Hart Lane; Attendance: 35,033; Referee: George Courtney

10 November 1990 12	Tottenham Hotspur	4–2	Wimbledon	Tottenham
15:00 GMT	Stewart 9'; Mabbutt 45'; Walsh 85'; Lineker 89' (pen.)	Report	Cork 26'; McGee 42'	Stadium: White Hart Lane; Attendance: 28,769; Referee: Allan Gunn

18 November 1990 13	Everton	1–1	Tottenham Hotspur	Liverpool
	McCall 15'	Report	Howells 39'	Stadium: Goodison Park; Attendance: 28,716; Referee: Keith Hackett

24 November 1990 14	Tottenham Hotspur	2–1	Norwich City	Tottenham
15:00 GMT	Lineker 29', 51'	Report	Crook 32'	Stadium: White Hart Lane; Attendance: 33,942; Referee: Roger Milford

1 December 1990 15	Chelsea	3–2	Tottenham Hotspur	Fulham
15:00 GMT	Dixon 5'; Bumstead 44'; Durie 56'	Report	Gascoigne 55'; Lineker (penalty missed) 58', 82'	Stadium: Stamford Bridge; Attendance: 33,478; Referee: Ken Redfern

8 December 1990 16	Tottenham Hotspur	3–3	Sunderland	Tottenham
	Walsh 64', 69'; Lineker 90'	Report	Pascoe 10', 75'; Davenport 22'	Stadium: White Hart Lane; Attendance: 30,431; Referee: Ian Hemley

15 December 1990 17	Manchester City	2–1	Tottenham Hotspur	Manchester
15:00 GMT	Redmond 76'; Ward 82' (pen.)	Report	Gascoigne 26'	Stadium: Maine Road; Attendance: 31,263; Referee: John Key

22 December 1990 18	Tottenham Hotspur	2–1	Luton Town	Tottenham
15:00 GMT	Stewart 34', 57'	Report	Dowie 12'	Stadium: White Hart Lane; Attendance: 27,007; Referee: David Elleray

26 December 1990 19	Coventry City	2–0	Tottenham Hotspur	Coventry
12:00 GMT	Gallacher 46'; Gynn 51'	Report		Stadium: Highfield Road; Attendance: 22;731; Referee: Terry Holbrook

29 December 1990 20	Southampton	3–0	Tottenham Hotspur	Southampton
15:00 GMT	Le Tissier 17', 73'; Wallace 67'	Report		Stadium: The Dell; Attendance: 21,405; Referee: John Deakin

1 January 1991 21	Tottenham Hotspur	1–2	Manchester United	Tottenham
15:00 GMT	Lineker 13' (pen.)	Report	Bruce 37' (pen.); McClair 89'	Stadium: White Hart Lane; Attendance: 29,399; Referee: Vic Callow

12 January 1991 22	Tottenham Hotspur	0–0	Arsenal	Tottenham
15:00 GMT		Report		Stadium: White Hart Lane; Attendance: 34,753; Referee: Alf Buksh

20 January 1991 23	Derby County	0–1	Tottenham Hotspur	Derby
15:00 GMT		Report	Lineker 28'	Stadium: Baseball Ground; Attendance: 17,747; Referee: Mike Reed

2 February 1991 24	Tottenham Hotspur	0–0	Leeds United	Tottenham
15:00 GMT		Report		Stadium: White Hart Lane; Attendance: 32,253; Referee: Keren Barratt

23 February 1991 25	Wimbledon	5–1	Tottenham Hotspur	Wimbledon
15:00 GMT	McGee 9'; Curle 60'; Gibson 79'; Fashanu 82'; Cork 87'	Report	Bergsson 71'	Stadium: Plough Lane; Attendance: 10,303; Referee: Kevin Breen

2 March 1991 26	Tottenham Hotspur	1–1	Chelsea	Tottenham
15:00 GMT	Lineker 41' (pen.)	Report	Durie 20'	Stadium: White Hart Lane; Attendance: 26,168; Referee: Ray Lewis

16 March 1991 27	Aston Villa	3–2	Tottenham Hotspur	Birmingham
	Platt 12', 35', 46'	Report	Samways 62'; Allen 83'	Stadium: Villa Park; Attendance: 32,638; Referee: John Martin

23 March 1991 28	Tottenham Hotspur	0–0	Queens Park Rangers	Tottenham
15:00 GMT		Report		Stadium: White Hart Lane; Attendance: 30,860; Referee: George Courtney

30 March 1991 29	Tottenham Hotspur	2–2	Coventry City	Tottenham
15:00 GMT	Nayim 42', 77'	Report	Smith 9'; Gallacher 20'	Stadium: White Hart Lane; Attendance: 29,033; Referee: Brian Stevens

1 April 1991 30	Luton Town	0–0	Tottenham Hotspur	Luton
15:00 BST		Report		Stadium: Kenilworth Road; Attendance: 11,322; Referee: Roger Wiseman

6 April 1991 31	Tottenham Hotspur	2–0	Southampton	Tottenham
	Lineker 37', 41'	Report		Stadium: White Hart Lane; Attendance: 24,291; Referee: Peter Foakes

10 April 1991 32	Norwich City	2–1	Tottenham Hotspur	Norwich
	Power 13'; Crook 19'	Report	Hendry 44'	Stadium: Carrow Road; Attendance: 19,014; Referee: Stephen Lodge

17 April 1991 33	Crystal Palace	1–0	Tottenham Hotspur	Selhurst
	Young 5'	Report		Stadium: Selhurst Park; Attendance: 26,285; Referee: Philip Don

20 April 1991 34	Sheffield United	2–2	Tottenham Hotspur	Sheffield
15:00 BST	Beesly 78'; Deane 90'	Report	Edinburgh 67'; Walsh 72'	Stadium: Bramall Lane; Attendance: 25,706; Referee: Ron Groves

6 April 1991 35	Tottenham Hotspur	3–3	Everton	Tottenham
19:45 BST	Allen 9'; Mabbutt 64'; Nayim 78'	Report	Nevin 5'; Stewart 48' (o.g.); Cottee 72'	Stadium: White Hart Lane; Attendance: 21,675; Referee: Jim Borrett

4 May 1991 36	Tottenham Hotspur	1–1	Nottingham Forest	Tottenham
15:00 BST	Nayim 68'	Report	Clough 23'	Stadium: White Hart Lane; Attendance: 30,891; Referee: Joseph Worrall

11 May 1991 37	Liverpool	2–0	Tottenham Hotspur	Liverpool
15:00 BST	Rush 41'; Speedie 48'	Report		Stadium: Anfield; Attendance: 36,192; Referee: Roger Milford

20 May 1991 38	Manchester United	1–1	Tottenham Hotspur	Manchester
	Ince 7'	Report	Hendry 51'	Stadium: Old Trafford; Attendance: 46,791; Referee: John Watson

=== FA Cup ===
5 January 1991 Third round	Blackpool	0–1	Tottenham Hotspur	Blackpool
15:00 GMT			Stewart 68'	Stadium: Bloomfield Road

26 January 1991 Fourth round	Tottenham Hotspur	4–2	Oxford United	Tottenham
15:00 GMT	Mabbutt 8'; Lineker 20'; Gascoigne 68', 87'	Report	Foyle 31', 80'	Stadium: White Hart Lane; Attendance: 31,665

16 February 1991 Fifth round	Portsmouth	1–2	Tottenham Hotspur	Portsmouth
	Chamberlain 44'	Report	Gascoigne 60', 84'	Stadium: Fratton Park; Attendance: 26,686

10 March 1991 Quarter-finals	Tottenham Hotspur	2–1	Notts County	Tottenham
15:05 GMT	Short 52' (o.g.); Gascoigne 83'		O'Riordan 41'	Stadium: White Hart Lane

14 April 1991 Semi-finals	Tottenham Hotspur	3–1	Arsenal	Wembley
12:00 BST	Gascoigne 5'; Lineker 10', 78'	Report	Smith 45'	Stadium: Wembley Stadium; Attendance: 77,893; Referee: Ray Lewis

18 May 1991 Final	Tottenham Hotspur	2–1 (a.e.t.)	Nottingham Forest	Wembley
15:00 BST	Stewart 53'; Walker 94' (o.g.)	Report	Pearce 15'	Stadium: Wembley Stadium; Attendance: 80,000; Referee: Roger Milford

=== Football League Cup ===
26 September 1990 Second round First leg	Tottenham Hotspur	5–0	Hartlepool United	Tottenham
19:45 BST	Lineker 2'; Gascoigne 26', 75', 81' (pen.), 86'	Report		Stadium: White Hart Lane; Attendance: 19,760

9 October 1990 Second round Second leg	Hartlepool United	1–2 (1–7 agg.)	Tottenham Hotspur	Hartlepool
19:30 BST	Dalton 60'		Stewart 10', 47'	Stadium: Victoria Park; Attendance: 9,700

30 October 1990 Third round	Tottenham Hotspur	2–1	Bradford City	Tottenham
19:45 GMT	Gascoigne; Stewart	Report	Oliver	Stadium: White Hart Lane; Attendance: 25,451

27 November 1990 Fourth round	Sheffield United	0–2	Tottenham Hotspur	Sheffield
		Report	Stewart 79'; Gascoigne 89'	Stadium: Bramall Lane; Attendance: 25,824

16 January 1991 Quarter-finals	Chelsea	0–0	Tottenham Hotspur	Fulham
19:45 GMT		Report		Stadium: Stamford Bridge; Attendance: 34,178

23 January 1991 Quarter-final replay	Tottenham Hotspur	0–3	Chelsea	Tottenham
19:45 GMT		Report	Townsend 16'; Dixon 70'; Wise 83' (pen.)	Stadium: White Hart Lane; Attendance: 33,861

== Statistics ==
=== Appearances ===
Last updated: 26 July 2020.

Pos.	Name	First Division		FA Cup		League Cup		Total	
Pos.	Name	Apps	Goals	Apps	Goals	Apps	Goals	Apps	Goals
Goalkeepers
GK	(Norway) Erik Thorstvedt	37	0	6	0	5	0	48	0
GK	(England) Ian Walker	1	0	0	0	0	0	1	0
GK	(England) Kevin Dearden	0	0	0	0	1	0	1	0
Defenders
DF	(Iceland) Guðni Bergsson	9+3	1	0	0	0	0	9+3	1
DF	(England) Justin Edinburgh	14+2	1	5	0	5	0	24+2	1
DF	(England) Terry Fenwick	4	0	2	0	2	0	8	0
DF	(England) Ian Hendon	0+2	0	0	0	0	0	0+2	0
DF	(England) Gary Mabbutt	35	2	6	1	6	0	47	3
DF	(England) Mitchell Thomas	23+8	0	2	0	4+1	0	29+9	0
DF	(England) Dave Tuttle	4+2	0	0	0	0+1	0	4+3	0
DF	(Wales) Pat Van Den Hauwe	31+1	0	5	0	2	0	38+1	0
Midfielders
MF	(England) Peter Garland	0+1	0	0	0	0	0	0+1	0
MF	(England) Paul Allen	34+2	3	6	0	6	0	46+2	3
MF	(England) Paul Gascoigne	26	7	6	6	4+1	6	36+1	19
MF	(England) David Howells	29	4	4	0	6	0	39	4
MF	(England) John Moncur	4+5	0	0	0	1+1	0	5+6	0
MF	(Spain) Nayim	32+1	5	3+2	1	2+3	0	37+6	6
MF	(England) Vinny Samways	14+9	1	4+1	0	4	0	22+10	1
MF	(England) Steve Sedgley	33+1	0	4+1	0	4+2	0	41+4	0
MF	(England) Paul Stewart	35	3	5	2	6	4	46	9
Forwards
FW	(Northern Ireland) Phil Gray	3+3	0	0+1	0	0	0	3+4	0
FW	(Scotland) John Hendry	2+2	2	0	0	0	0	2+2	2
FW	(England) Gary Lineker	32	15	6	3	5	1	43	19
FW	(England) Paul Moran	0+1	0	1	0	0	0	1+1	0
FW	(England) Paul Walsh	16+13	7	1+3	0	3+3	0	20+19	7

Last updated: 15 May 1999

=== Goal scorers ===
Last updated: 26 July 2020.

Rnk	Pos	Player	First Division	FA Cup	League Cup	Total
1	MF	(England) Paul Gascoigne	7	6	6	19
1	FW	(England) Gary Lineker	15	3	1	19
3	MF	(England) Paul Stewart	3	2	4	9
4	FW	(England) Paul Walsh	7	0	0	7
5	MF	(Spain) Nayim	5	1	0	6
6	MF	(England) David Howells	4	0	0	4
7	MF	(England) Paul Allen	3	0	0	3
7	DF	(England) Gary Mabbutt	2	1	0	3
9	FW	(Scotland) John Hendry	2	0	0	2
10	DF	(Iceland) Guðni Bergsson	1	0	0	1
10	DF	(England) Justin Edinburgh	1	0	0	1
10	MF	(England) Vinny Samways	1	0	0	1
Total			51	13	11	75

=== Clean sheets ===
Last updated: 26 July 2020.

Rnk	Player	First Division	FA Cup	League Cup	Total
1	(Norway) Erik Thorstvedt	12	1	3	16
Total		12	1	3	16

== See also ==
- 1990-91 in English football
- List of Tottenham Hotspur F.C. seasons
