= 1989–90 Tottenham Hotspur F.C. season =

English football club season

Tottenham Hotspur
1989–90 season
- Chairman: Irving Scholar
- Manager: Terry Venables
- Stadium: White Hart Lane
- First Division: 3rd
- FA Cup: Third-round
- League Cup: Quarter-final
- Top goalscorer: League: Gary Lineker (24); All: Gary Lineker (26)
- Highest home attendance: 33,944 (18 October vs. Arsenal, First Division)
- Lowest home attendance: 15,734 (20 September vs. Southend United, League Cup)
- Average home league attendance: 26,465
Home colours	Away colours

The 1989–90 season was the 108th season in the history of Tottenham Hotspur Football Club, and their 12th consecutive season in the top flight of English football. In addition to the domestic league, the club participated in the FA Cup and the Football League Cup. Entering the 1989–90 season, Terry Venables stayed on as manager for his third season in charge of Tottenham with the team ending in third position, sixteen points behind eventual champions Liverpool. In the FA Cup, they got knocked out by fellow first division team, Southampton and they got knocked out in the quarter-finals of the Football League Cup by Nottingham Forest.

== Pre-season and friendlies ==
=== Pre-season ===
19 July 1989 Friendly	Tottenham Hotspur (England)	3–1	(England) Fulham	Barnet
	Howells; Moran		Goal	Stadium: Chase Lodge

23 July 1989 Tour	Bohemian (Republic of Ireland)	0–2	(England) Tottenham Hotspur	Dublin, Ireland
15:00 BST			Stewart; Walsh	Stadium: Dalymount Park

25 July 1989 Tour	Cork City (Republic of Ireland)	0–3	(England) Tottenham Hotspur	Cork, Ireland
			Mabbutt; Gascoigne; Linerker	Stadium: Musgrave Park

28 July 1989 Friendly	Tottenham Hotspur (England)	6–0	(England) Bournemouth	Barnet
	Walsh; Stewart; Gascoigne; Howells			Stadium: Chase Lodge

1 August 1989 Friendly	Tottenham Hotspur (England)	0–1	(England) Swindon Town	Barnet
			Goal	Stadium: Chase Lodge

6 August 1989 Tour	Rangers (Scotland)	1–0	(England) Tottenham Hotspur	Glasgow, Scotland
	Steven			Stadium: Ibrox Stadium; Attendance: 41,214

8 August 1989 Tour	Viking FK (Norway)	1–5	(England) Tottenham Hotspur	Stavanger, Norway
	Goal		Stewart; Fenwick (pen.); Gascoigne; Lineker	Stadium: Stavanger Stadion

10 August 1989 Tour	SK Brann (Norway)	0–2	(England) Tottenham Hotspur	Bergen, Norway
			Lineker	Stadium: Brann Stadion

==== Trofeo Villa de Madrid tournament ====
11 August 1989 Friendly	Dinamo București (Romania)	3–1	(England) Tottenham Hotspur	Madrid, Spain
	Sabău 12'; Vaișcovici; Răducioiu (pen.)		Howells 24' (pen.)	Stadium: Vicente Calderón; Attendance: 2,500

13 August 1989 Friendly	Atlético Madrid (Spain)	1–0	(England) Tottenham Hotspur	Madrid, Spain
	Marina			Stadium: Vicente Calderón

=== Mid-season ===
31 October 1989 Friendly	SM Caen (France)	1–2	(England) Tottenham Hotspur
	Goal		Stewart; Howells

6 November 1989 Friendly	Leicester City (England)	2–5	(England) Tottenham Hotspur	Leicester
	Goal		Stewart; Gascoigne; Sedgley	Stadium: Filbert Street
Note: Paul Ramsey testimonial

26 January 1990 Friendly	Plymouth Argyle (England)	0–3	(England) Tottenham Hotspur
			Mabbutt; Gascoigne; (o.g.)

3 April 1990 Friendly	Brighton & Hove Albion (England)	0–3	(England) Tottenham Hotspur
			Gascoigne; Stewart

23 April 1990 Friendly	Vålerenga (Norway)	1–1	(England) Tottenham Hotspur
	Goal		Howells

1 May 1990 Friendly	Tottenham Hotspur (England)	2–1	Northern Ireland XI	Tottenham
	Howells 13'; Gascoigne 42' (pen.)		Wilson 20'	Stadium: White Hart Lane; Attendance: 6,769
Note: Danny Blanchflower benefit match

== Competitions ==
=== Overview ===
Competition	First match	Last match	Starting round	Final position	Record							
Competition	First match	Last match	Starting round	Final position	Pld	W	D	L	GF	GA	GD	Win %
First Division	19 August 1989	5 May 1990	Matchday 1	3rd	38	19	6	13	59	47	+12	50.00
FA Cup	6 January 1990	6 January 1990	Third round	Third round	1	0	0	1	1	3	−2	0.00
League Cup	20 September 1989	24 January 1990	Second round	Fifth round	7	3	2	2	16	10	+6	42.86
Total					46	22	8	16	76	60	+16	47.83

Source: Competitions

=== First Division ===
==== League Table ====
Pos	Team	Pld	W	D	L	GF	GA	GD	Pts	Qualification or relegation
1	Liverpool (C)	38	23	10	5	78	37	+41	79	Disqualified from the European Cup (Note: Liverpool were banned by UEFA from its competitions from the season 1985–86 on for 10 years, because of the Heysel Stadium disaster in 1985, involving Liverpool fans. The ban was eventually lifted for the 1991–92 season.)
2	Aston Villa	38	21	7	10	57	38	+19	70	Qualification for the UEFA Cup first round
3	Tottenham Hotspur	38	19	6	13	59	47	+12	63	
4	Arsenal	38	18	8	12	54	38	+16	62	
5	Chelsea	38	16	12	10	58	50	+8	60	

Source: World Football
Rules for classification: 1) Points; 2) Goal difference; 3) Goals scored
(C) Champions

==== Matches ====
Win Draw Loss

19 August 1989 1	Tottenham Hotspur	2–1	Luton Town	Tottenham
15:00 BST	Stewart 29'; Allen 80'		Wegerle 46'	Stadium: White Hart Lane; Attendance: 17,668; Referee: Terry Holbrook

22 August 1989 2	Everton	2–1	Tottenham Hotspur	Walton
	Newell 2'; Sheedy 70'		Allen 19'	Stadium: Goodison Park; Attendance: 34,402; Referee: Gerald Ashby

26 August 1989 3	Manchester City	1–1	Tottenham Hotspur	Manchester
15:00 BST	White 29'		Gascoigne 37'	Stadium: Maine Road; Attendance: 32,004

9 September 1989 4	Aston Villa	2–0	Tottenham Hotspur	Birmingham
	Olney 9', 25'			Stadium: Villa Park; Attendance: 24,769; Referee: Kelvin Morton

16 September 1989 5	Tottenham Hotspur	1–4	Chelsea	Tottenham
15:00 BST	Gascoigne 61'		Dixon 36'; Wilson 44', 76'; Clarke 69'	Stadium: White Hart Lane; Attendance: 16,260

23 September 1989 6	Norwich City	2–2	Tottenham Hotspur	Norwich
15:00 BST	Phillips 48'; Bowen 57'		Gascoigne 20'; Lineker 34'	Stadium: Carrow Road; Attendance: 20,095

30 September 1989 7	Tottenham Hotspur	3–2	Queens Park Rangers	Tottenham
15:00 BST	Lineker 32', 38', 87'		Bardsley 51'; Francis 70'	Stadium: White Hart Lane; Attendance: 23,781

14 October 1989 8	Charlton Athletic	1–3	Tottenham Hotspur	Selhurst
15:00 BST	Williams 55'		Thomas 73'; Lineker 83'; Gascoigne 87'	Stadium: Selhurst Park; Attendance: 17,692; Referee: David Axcell

18 October 1989 9	Tottenham Hotspur	2–1	Arsenal	Tottenham
19:45 BST	Samways 34'; Walsh 37'		Thomas 53'	Stadium: White Hart Lane; Attendance: 33,944; Referee: Roger Milford

21 October 1989 10	Tottenham Hotspur	3–0	Sheffield Wednesday	Tottenham
15:00 BST	Lineker 21', 42'; Moran 64'			Stadium: White Hart Lane; Attendance: 26,909; Referee: Martin Bodenham

29 October 1989 11	Liverpool	1–0	Tottenham Hotspur	Liverpool
15:30 GMT	Barnes 25'			Stadium: Anfield; Attendance: 36,550

4 November 1989 12	Southampton	1–1	Tottenham Hotspur	Southampton
15:00 GMT	Cockerill 61'		Gascoigne 43'; Sedgley (red card) 78'	Stadium: The Dell; Attendance: 19,601; Referee: Rodger Gifford

11 November 1989 13	Tottenham Hotspur	0–1	Wimbledon	Tottenham
15:00 GMT			Sanchez 62'	Stadium: White Hart Lane; Attendance: 26,876; Referee: John Key

18 November 1989 14	Crystal Palace	2–3	Tottenham Hotspur	Selhurst
15:00 GMT	Bright 21', 62'		Howells 23'; Lineker 25' (pen.); Samways 76'	Stadium: Selhurst Park; Attendance: 26,266

25 November 1989 15	Tottenham Hotspur	1–2	Derby County	Tottenham
15:00 GMT	Stewart 4'		Saunders 52'; Goddard 76'	Stadium: White Hart Lane; Attendance: 28,075; Referee: Ken Redfern

2 December 1989 16	Luton Town	0–0	Tottenham Hotspur	Luton
15:00 GMT				Stadium: Kenilworth Road; Attendance: 12,620

9 December 1989 17	Tottenham Hotspur	2–1	Everton	Tottenham
15:00 GMT	Lineker 24'; Stewart 60'		Cottee 12'	Stadium: White Hart Lane; Attendance: 29,374

16 December 1989 18	Manchester United	0–1	Tottenham Hotspur	Trafford
15:00 GMT			Lineker 69'	Stadium: Old Trafford; Attendance: 36,230

26 December 1989 19	Tottenham Hotspur	3–1	Millwall	Tottenham
11:30 GMT	Samways 8'; McLeary 18' (o.g.); Lineker 35'		Cascarino 71'	Stadium: White Hart Lane; Attendance: 26,874; Referee: Roger Wiseman

30 December 1989 20	Tottenham Hotspur	2–3	Nottingham Forest	Tottenham
15:00 GMT	Lineker 11', 89'		Clough 27'; Crosby 29'; Parker 70'	Stadium: White Hart Lane; Attendance: 33,401

1 January 1990 21	Coventry City	0–0	Tottenham Hotspur	Coventry
15:00 GMT				Stadium: Highfield Road; Attendance: 19,559

13 January 1990 22	Tottenham Hotspur	1–1	Manchester City	Tottenham
15:00 GMT	Howells 44'		Hendry 85'	Stadium: White Hart Lane; Attendance: 26,384

20 January 1990 23	Arsenal	1–0	Tottenham Hotspur	Holloway
15:00 GMT	Adams 63'			Stadium: Highbury; Attendance: 46,132

4 February 1990 24	Tottenham Hotspur	4–0	Norwich City	Tottenham
15:30 GMT	Lineker 24', 47', 63' (pen.); Howells 44'			Stadium: White Hart Lane; Attendance: 19,599

10 February 1990 25	Chelsea	1–2	Tottenham Hotspur	Fulham
15:00 GMT	Bumstead 59' (yellow card) 65'		Howells 44'; Lineker 88'; Gascoigne (yellow card)	Stadium: Stamford Bridge; Attendance: 28,130

21 February 1990 26	Tottenham Hotspur	0–2	Aston Villa	Tottenham
19:45 GMT			Ormondroyd 51'; Platt 66'	Stadium: White Hart Lane; Attendance: 32,472

24 February 1990 27	Derby County	2–1	Tottenham Hotspur	Derby
	Saunders 37'; Harford 52'		Moncur 84'	Stadium: Baseball Ground; Attendance: 19,676

3 March 1990 28	Tottenham Hotspur	0–1	Crystal Palace	Tottenham
15:00 GMT			Pardew 60'	Stadium: White Hart Lane; Attendance: 26,181; Referee: Bob Nixon

10 March 1990 29	Tottenham Hotspur	3–0	Charlton Athletic	Tottenham
15:00 GMT	Polston 21'; Lineker 56'; Howells 77'			Stadium: White Hart Lane; Attendance: 21,204; Referee: Philip Don

17 March 1990 30	Queens Park Rangers	3–1	Tottenham Hotspur	Shepherd's Bush
15:00 GMT	Clarke 4'; Sinton 46'; Barker 53'		Walsh 54'	Stadium: Loftus Road; Attendance: 17,434; Referee: David Allison

21 March 1990 31	Tottenham Hotspur	1–0	Liverpool	Tottenham
20:05 GMT	Stewart 83'			Stadium: White Hart Lane; Attendance: 25,656

31 March 1990 32	Sheffield Wednesday	2–4	Tottenham Hotspur	Sheffield
15:00 BST	Hirst 21'; Atkinson 53'		Allen 3'; Lineker 60', 62'; Stewart 70'	Stadium: Hillsborough; Attendance: 26,582

7 April 1990 33	Nottingham Forest	1–3	Tottenham Hotspur	Nottingham
	Hodge 59'		Stewart 9'; Allen 44', 71'	Stadium: City Ground; Attendance: 21,668

14 April 1990 34	Tottenham Hotspur	3–2	Coventry City	Tottenham
15:00 BST	Lineker 33', 69'; Stewart 45'		Smith 18'; Speedie 32'	Stadium: White Hart Lane; Attendance: 23,917

16 April 1990 35	Millwall	0–1	Tottenham Hotspur	New Cross
15:00 BST			Lineker 50'	Stadium: The Den; Attendance: 10,574; Referee: Paul Durkin

21 April 1990 36	Tottenham Hotspur	2–1	Manchester United	Tottenham
15:00 BST	Gascoigne 21'; Lineker 25'		Bruce 68' (pen.)	Stadium: White Hart Lane; Attendance: 33,317; Referee: Trevor Simpson

28 April 1990 37	Wimbledon	1–0	Tottenham Hotspur	Wimbledon
15:00 BST	Fashanu 7'			Stadium: Plough Lane; Attendance: 12,800

5 May 1990 38	Tottenham Hotspur	2–1	Southampton	Tottenham
15:00 BST	Stewart 21'; Allen 34'		Cook 88'	Stadium: White Hart Lane; Attendance: 31,038; Referee: Trelford Mills

=== FA Cup ===
As part of the first division, Tottenham automatically qualified through to the third round of the FA Cup where they was drawn to meet fellow first division side Southampton in their first match. In the match, Tottenham was dominated by the Southampton midfield in Jimmy Case, Glenn Cockerill and Barry Horne with Southampton getting a 3–1 victory despite a goal from David Howells giving Tottenham hope with twelve minutes to go.

6 January 1990 Third round	Tottenham Hotspur	1–3	Southampton	Tottenham
15:00 GMT	Howells		Le Tissier; Wallace; Horne	Stadium: White Hart Lane; Attendance: 33,134; Referee: Joe Worrall

=== Football League Cup ===
As part of the first division, Tottenham started the League Cup in the second round where they were drawn to meet fourth division side, Southend United. Over two legs, Tottenham would only scrape through on away goals with David Lacey from The Guardian describing their defence as secure as a sandcastle on high tide after the first leg. Two weeks later, they played fellow first division club Manchester United in the third round. After losing Terry Fenwick early in the match, Tottenham won 3–0 with goals on either side of the break securing the victory.

Tottenham had another away game in the fourth round, this time to Prenton Park to take on third division side Tranmere Rovers. A goal from Paul Gascoigne an own goal from Dave Higgins sent the match into a replay at White Hart which Tottenham winning 4–0. The following round saw them visit City Ground, the home stadium of Nottingham Forest and saw them go two goals down before the half but goals from Gary Lineker and Steve Sedgley force the match into a replay at White Hart. Nayim scored the opening goal within the first minute before Nottingham scored the equalizer in the 36th minute before gaining the lead five minutes later. In the 64th minute, Tottenham equalized with Paul Walsh after coming of a David Howells kick. But two minutes later, Steve Hodge scored the match winner for Nottingham and knocking out Tottenham in the process.

20 September 1989 Second round First leg	Tottenham Hotspur	1–0	Southend United	Tottenham
	Fenwick			Stadium: White Hart Lane; Attendance: 15,734

4 October 1989 Second round Second leg	Southend United	3–2 (a.e.t.) (3–3 (a.) agg.)	Tottenham Hotspur	Southend
19:45 BST	Goal		Allen; Nayim	Stadium: Roots Hall; Attendance: 10,400; Referee: Paul Danson

25 October 1989 Third round	Manchester United	0–3	Tottenham Hotspur	Trafford
19:45 BST			Samways; Lineker; Nayim	Stadium: Old Trafford; Attendance: 45,759

22 November 1989 Fourth round	Tranmere Rovers	2–2	Tottenham Hotspur	Birkenhead
	Vickers; Steele		Gascoigne; Higgins (o.g.)	Stadium: Prenton Park; Attendance: 13,789; Referee: Lester Shapter

29 November 1989 Fourth round replay	Tottenham Hotspur	4–0	Tranmere Rovers	Tottenham
19:45 GMT	Howells; Mabbutt; Stewart; Allen			Stadium: White Hart Lane; Attendance: 23,724

17 January 1990 Fifth round	Nottingham Forest	2–2	Tottenham Hotspur	Nottingham
	Crosby; Parker		Lineker; Sedgley	Stadium: City Ground; Attendance: 30,044

24 January 1990 Fifth round replay	Tottenham Hotspur	2–3	Nottingham Forest	Tottenham
19:45 GMT	Nayim; Walsh		Hodge; Jemson	Stadium: White Hart Lane; Attendance: 32,357; Referee: Brian Hill

== Statistics ==
=== Appearances ===
Last updated: 26 July 2020.

Pos.	Name	First Division		FA Cup		EFL Cup		Total	
Pos.	Name	Apps	Goals	Apps	Goals	Apps	Goals	Apps	Goals
Goalkeepers
GK	(Norway) Erik Thorstvedt	34	0	0	0	7	0	41	0
GK	(England) Bobby Mimms	4	0	1	0	0	0	5	0
Defenders
DF	(Iceland) Guðni Bergsson	17+1	0	1	0	1	0	19+1	0
DF	(England) Guy Butters	7	0	0	0	1	0	8	0
DF	(England) Terry Fenwick	10	0	0	0	3	1	13	1
DF	(Republic of Ireland) Chris Hughton	8	0	1	0	0+1	0	9+1	0
DF	(England) Gary Mabbutt	36	0	1	0	7	1	44	1
DF	(England) Andy Polston	1	0	0	0	0	0	1	0
DF	(England) John Polston	10+3	1	0	0	3	0	13+3	1
DF	(England) Gary Stevens	4+3	0	0	0	0+1	0	4+4	0
DF	(England) Mitchell Thomas	18+8	1	1	0	7	0	26+8	1
DF	(Wales) Pat Van Den Hauwe	31	0	0	0	6	0	37	0
Midfielders
MF	(England) Paul Gascoigne	34	6	0	0	4	1	38	7
MF	(England) David Howells	33+1	5	1	1	5+1	1	39+2	7
MF	(England) Paul Allen	29+3	6	1	0	6	2	36+3	8
MF	(England) John Moncur	2+3	1	0	0	0	0	2+3	1
MF	(Spain) Nayim	18+1	0	0	0	3+1	3	21+2	3
MF	(England) Mark Robson	0+3	0	0	0	1	0	1+3	0
MF	(England) Vinny Samways	18+5	3	1	0	4+1	1	23+6	4
MF	(England) Paul Stewart	25+3	8	1	0	6	1	32+3	9
MF	(England) Steve Sedgley	31+1	0	1	0	6	1	38+1	1
Forwards
FW	(England) Gary Lineker	38	24	1	0	6	2	45	26
FW	(England) Paul Moran	0+5	1	0	0	0+1	0	0+6	1
FW	(England) Paul Walsh	12+14	2	0+1	0	1+3	1	13+18	3

Last updated: 15 May 1999

=== Goal scorers ===
Last updated: 26 July 2020.

Rnk	Pos	Player	First Division	FA Cup	EFL Cup	Total
1	FW	(England) Gary Lineker	24	0	2	26
2	MF	(England) Paul Stewart	8	0	1	9
3	MF	(England) Paul Allen	6	0	2	8
4	MF	(England) Paul Gascoigne	6	0	1	7
4	MF	(England) David Howells	5	1	1	7
6	MF	(England) Vinny Samways	3	0	1	4
7	MF	(Spain) Nayim	0	0	3	3
7	FW	(England) Paul Walsh	2	0	1	3
9	DF	(England) Terry Fenwick	0	0	1	1
9	DF	(England) Gary Mabbutt	0	0	1	1
9	MF	(England) John Moncur	1	0	0	1
9	FW	(England) Paul Moran	1	0	0	1
9	DF	(England) John Polston	1	0	0	1
9	MF	(England) Steve Sedgley	0	0	1	1
9	DF	(England) Mitchell Thomas	1	0	0	1
Total			58	1	15	74

=== Clean sheets ===
Last updated: 26 July 2020.

Rnk	Player	First Division	FA Cup	EFL Cup	Total
1	(Norway) Erik Thorstvedt	6	0	3	9
2	(England) Bobby Mimms	2	0	0	2
Total		8	0	3	11

== See also ==
- 1989–90 in English football
- List of Tottenham Hotspur F.C. seasons
