= 1988–89 Tottenham Hotspur F.C. season =

English football club season

Tottenham Hotspur
1988–89 season
- Chairman: Irving Scholar
- Manager: Terry Venables
- Stadium: White Hart Lane
- First Division: 6th
- FA Cup: Third round
- League Cup: Fourth round
- Top goalscorer: League: Chris Waddle; (14); All: Chris Waddle; (14)
- Highest home attendance: 32,621 (9 September vs. Arsenal, First Division)
- Lowest home attendance: 14,953 (11 October vs. Notts County, League Cup)
- Average home league attendance: 24,467
- Biggest win: 5–0 (29 April 1989 vs Millwall, First Division)
| Home colours | Away colours |

The 1988–89 season was the 107th season in the history of Tottenham Hotspur Football Club, and their 11th consecutive season in the top flight of English football. In addition to the domestic league, the club participated in the FA Cup and the Football League Cup. Entering the 1988–89 season, Terry Venables stayed on as manager for his second season in charge of Tottenham with the team ending in sixth position, nineteen points behind eventual champions Arsenal. In the FA Cup, they got knocked out by second division team, Bradford City and they got knocked out in the fourth round of the Football League Cup by Southampton.

== Pre-season and friendlies ==
=== Pre-season ===
==== Sweden Summer Tour ====
| 26 July 1988 Friendly | Vederslöv/Dänningelanda IF XI (Sweden) | 1–4 | (England) Tottenham Hotspur | Sweden |
| | Goal | | Walsh; Stewart (pen.) | Attendance: 1,850 |

| 28 July 1988 Friendly | Trelleborgs FF (Sweden) | 0–3 | (England) Tottenham Hotspur | Sweden |
| | | | Fenwick (pen.); Moran | Attendance: 3,226 |

| 31 July 1988 Friendly | GAIS (Sweden) | 1–1 | (England) Tottenham Hotspur | Sweden |
| | Goal | | Walsh | Attendance: 2,350 |

| 2 August 1988 Friendly | Jönköpings Södra IF (Sweden) | 1–1 | (England) Tottenham Hotspur | Sweden |
| | Goal | | Waddle |

==== Friendlies ====
| 7 August 1988 Friendly | Dundee United (Scotland) | 1–1 | (England) Tottenham Hotspur | Dundee, Scotland |
| | Goal | | Walsh | Stadium: Tannadice Park; Attendance: 9,685; Referee: D. Yeats |
Note: David Narey's Testimonial

| 10 August 1988 Friendly | Reading (England) | 2–1 | (England) Tottenham Hotspur |
| | Goal | | Gascoigne |

| 16 August 1988 Friendly | Chelsea (England) | 0–0 | (England) Tottenham Hotspur |
Note: Colin Pates Testimonial

| 21 August 1988 Friendly | West Ham United (England) | 2–0 | (England) Tottenham Hotspur |
| | Goal |
Note: Alvin Martin's Testimonial

| 6 September 1988 Friendly | Swansea City (Wales) | 0–3 | (England) Tottenham Hotspur |
| | | | Gascoigne; Howells; Gray |

| 18 October 1988 Friendly | Home Farm (Republic of Ireland) | 0–4 | (England) Tottenham Hotspur |
| | | | (o.g.); Howells; Fenwick; Stewart |

==== Wembley International Tournament ====
| 13 August 1988 Friendly | Tottenham Hotspur (England) | 0–4 | (England) Arsenal | Wembley |
| | | | Goal | Stadium: Wembley Stadium; Attendance: 30,104 |

| 14 August 1988 Friendly | Tottenham Hotspur (England) | 1–2 | (Italy) AC Milan | Wembley |
| | Fenwick | | Goal | Stadium: Wembley Stadium; Attendance: 27,369 |

=== Mid-season ===
==== Friendlies ====
| 17 January 1989 Friendly | Tottenham Hotspur (England) | 1–3 | (France) AS Monaco |
| | Moncur (pen.) | | Fofana; Hateley; Ferratge |

| 18 February 1989 Friendly | Tottenham Hotspur (England) | 3–0 | (Sweden) IFK Göteborg |
| | Nayim; Walsh; Robson |

| 4 March 1989 Friendly | Tottenham Hotspur (England) | 1–2 | (France) Bordeaux | Tottenham |
| | Mabbutt 82' | | Ferreri 44'; Allen 65' | Stadium: White Hart Lane; Referee: Tony Ward |

| 4 April 1989 Friendly | Charlton Athletic (England) | 4–3 | (England) Tottenham Hotspur | Charlton |
| 19:45 BST | Williams; MacKenzie; Flanagan | | Walsh; Stewart | Stadium: The Valley; Attendance: 1,762; Referee: John Moules |
Note: Steve Gritt's Testimonial

== Competitions ==
=== Overview ===
| Competition | First match | Last match | Starting round | Final position | Record | | | | | | | |
| Competition | First match | Last match | Starting round | Final position | Pld | W | D | L | GF | GA | GD | Win % |
|---|---|---|---|---|---|---|---|---|---|---|---|---|
| First Division | 3 September 1988 | 13 May 1989 | Matchday 1 | 6th | 38 | 15 | 12 | 11 | 60 | 46 | +14 | 39.47 |
| FA Cup | 9 January 1989 | 9 January 1989 | Third round | Third round | 1 | 0 | 0 | 1 | 0 | 1 | −1 | 0.00 |
| League Cup | 27 September 1988 | 29 November 1988 | Second round | Fourth round | 5 | 2 | 2 | 1 | 6 | 5 | +1 | 40.00 |
| Total | | | | | 44 | 17 | 14 | 13 | 66 | 52 | +14 | 38.64 |

Source: Competitions

=== First Division ===
==== League Table ====
| Pos | Team | Pld | W | D | L | GF | GA | GD | Pts | Qualification or relegation |
|---|---|---|---|---|---|---|---|---|---|---|
| 4 | Norwich City | 38 | 17 | 11 | 10 | 48 | 45 | +3 | 62 | Disqualified from the UEFA Cup |
| 5 | Derby County | 38 | 17 | 7 | 14 | 40 | 38 | +2 | 58 | |
| 6 | Tottenham Hotspur | 38 | 15 | 12 | 11 | 60 | 46 | +14 | 57 | |
| 7 | Coventry City | 38 | 14 | 13 | 11 | 47 | 42 | +5 | 55 | |
| 8 | Everton | 38 | 14 | 12 | 12 | 50 | 45 | +5 | 54 | |

Source: World Football
Rules for classification: 1) Points; 2) Goal difference; 3) Goals scored

==== Matches ====
Win Draw Loss

| 3 September 1988 1 | Newcastle United | 2–2 | Tottenham Hotspur | Newcastle upon Tyne |
| | Thorn 4'; Jackson 19' | | Waddle 46'; Fenwick 58' | Stadium: St James' Park; Attendance: 33,508 |

| 10 September 1988 2 | Tottenham Hotspur | 2–3 | Arsenal | Tottenham |
| | Waddle 25'; Gascoigne 40' | | Winterburn 20'; Marwood 29'; Smith 30' | Stadium: White Hart Lane; Attendance: 32,621 |

| 17 September 1988 3 | Liverpool | 1–1 | Tottenham Hotspur | Liverpool |
| | Beardsley 78' | | Gascoigne (yellow card) 9'; Fenwick 79'; Fairclough (red card) 81' | Stadium: Anfield; Attendance: 40,929 |

| 24 September 1988 4 | Tottenham Hotspur | 3–2 | Middlesbrough | Tottenham |
| | Waddle 40'; Howells 85'; Fenwick 90' (pen.) | | Slaven 27'; Mowbray 50' | Stadium: White Hart Lane; Attendance: 23,427 |

| 1 October 1988 5 | Tottenham Hotspur | 2–2 | Manchester United | Tottenham |
| 15:00 BST | Walsh 37'; Waddle 86' | | McClair 42'; Hughes 71' | Stadium: White Hart Lane; Attendance: 29,318; Referee: Keith Cooper |

| 8 October 1988 6 | Charlton Athletic | 2–2 | Tottenham Hotspur | Selhurst |
| 15:00 BST | Peake 14'; Jones 65' | | Fenwick 55' (pen.); Allen 77' | Stadium: Selhurst Park; Attendance: 14,384; Referee: Joe Worrall |

| 22 October 1988 7 | Norwich City | 3–1 | Tottenham Hotspur | Norwich |
| | Rosario 35'; Fleck 43'; Linighan 69' | | Fairclough 57' | Stadium: Carrow Road; Attendance: 20,330 |

| 25 October 1988 8 | Tottenham Hotspur | 1–2 | Southampton | Tottenham |
| | Wallace 16' (o.g.) | | Cockerill 67', 80' | Stadium: White Hart Lane; Attendance: 19,517 |

| 29 October 1988 9 | Aston Villa | 2–1 | Tottenham Hotspur | Birmingham |
| | Fenwick 60' (o.g.); Daley 79' | | Fenwick 73' | Stadium: Villa Park; Attendance: 26,238 |

| 5 November 1988 10 | Tottenham Hotspur | 1–3 | Derby County | Tottenham |
| | Stewart 6' | | McMinn 24', 62'; Saunders 70' | Stadium: White Hart Lane; Attendance: 22,868 |

| 12 November 1988 11 | Tottenham Hotspur | 3–2 | Wimbledon | Tottenham |
| 15:00 GMT | Fenwick 18'; Butters 61'; Samways 62' | | Gibson 21', 82' | Stadium: White Hart Lane; Attendance: 23,589 |

| 20 November 1988 12 | Sheffield Wednesday | 0–2 | Tottenham Hotspur | Sheffield |
| | | | Stewart 80', 83' | Stadium: Hillsborough; Attendance: 15,386 |

| 23 November 1988 13 | Tottenham Hotspur | 1–1 | Coventry City | Tottenham |
| 19:45 GMT | Stewart 10' | | Houchen 73' | Stadium: White Hart Lane; Attendance: 21,961; Referee: Allan Gunn |

| 26 November 1988 14 | Tottenham Hotspur | 2–2 | Queens Park Rangers | Tottenham |
| | Gascoigne 54'; Waddle 75' | | Falco 21'; Francis 32' | Stadium: White Hart Lane; Attendance: 26,698 |

| 3 December 1988 15 | Everton | 1–0 | Tottenham Hotspur | Walton |
| | Cottee 35' | | | Stadium: Goodison Park; Attendance: 29,657 |

| 10 December 1988 16 | Tottenham Hotspur | 2–0 | Millwall | Tottenham |
| | Waddle 18'; Gascoigne 62' | | | Stadium: White Hart Lane; Attendance: 27,660 |

| 17 December 1988 17 | West Ham United | 0–2 | Tottenham Hotspur | Upton Park |
| 15:00 GMT | | | Mabbutt 23'; Thomas 70' | Stadium: Boleyn Ground; Attendance: 28,379 |

| 26 December 1988 18 | Tottenham Hotspur | 0–0 | Luton Town | Tottenham |
| | | | | Stadium: White Hart Lane; Attendance: 27,337 |

| 31 December 1988 19 | Tottenham Hotspur | 2–0 | Newcastle United | Tottenham |
| | Walsh 21'; Waddle 30' | | | Stadium: White Hart Lane; Attendance: 27,739 |

| 2 January 1989 20 | Arsenal | 2–0 | Tottenham Hotspur | Holloway |
| | Merson 24'; Thomas 90' | | | Stadium: Highbury; Attendance: 45,129 |

| 15 January 1989 21 | Tottenham Hotspur | 1–2 | Nottingham Forest | Tottenham |
| | Waddle 45' | | Clough 32'; Parker 33' | Stadium: White Hart Lane; Attendance: 16,903 |

| 21 January 1989 22 | Middlesbrough | 2–2 | Tottenham Hotspur | Middlesbrough |
| | Cooper 41'; Ripley 63' | | Stewart 45', 49' | Stadium: Ayresome Park; Attendance: 23,692 |

| 5 February 1989 23 | Manchester United | 1–0 | Tottenham Hotspur | Trafford |
| 15:09 GMT | McClair 57' | | | Stadium: Old Trafford; Attendance: 41,423 |

| 11 February 1989 24 | Tottenham Hotspur | 1–1 | Charlton Athletic | Tottenham |
| 15:00 GMT | Stewart 76' | | Williams 36' | Stadium: White Hart Lane; Attendance: 22,803; Referee: Ron Groves |

| 21 February 1989 25 | Tottenham Hotspur | 2–1 | Norwich City | Tottenham |
| 19:45 GMT | Gascoigne 13'; Waddle 65' | | Putney 52' | Stadium: White Hart Lane; Attendance: 19,120; Referee: John Holbrook |

| 25 February 1989 26 | Southampton | 0–2 | Tottenham Hotspur | Southampton |
| | | | Waddle 34'; Nayim 86' | Stadium: The Dell; Attendance: 16,702 |

| 1 March 1989 27 | Tottenham Hotspur | 2–0 | Aston Villa | Tottenham |
| | Waddle 23', 66' | | | Stadium: White Hart Lane; Attendance: 19,090 |

| 11 March 1989 28 | Derby County | 1–1 | Tottenham Hotspur | Derby |
| | Saunders 33' | | Gascoigne 57' | Stadium: Baseball Ground; Attendance: 18,206 |

| 18 March 1989 29 | Coventry City | 1–1 | Tottenham Hotspur | Coventry |
| | Bannister 18' | | Waddle 67' | Stadium: Highfield Road; Attendance: 17,156 |

| 22 March 1989 30 | Nottingham Forest | 1–2 | Tottenham Hotspur | Nottingham |
| | Parker 49' | | Howells 79'; Samways 88' | Stadium: City Ground; Attendance: 23,098 |

| 26 March 1989 31 | Tottenham Hotspur | 1–2 | Liverpool | Tottenham |
| | Fenwick 48' | | Aldridge 50'; Beardsley 64' | Stadium: White Hart Lane; Attendance: 30,012; Referee: Roger Milford |

| 28 March 1989 32 | Luton Town | 1–3 | Tottenham Hotspur | Luton |
| | Foster 42' | | Howells 55'; Walsh 82'; Gascoigne 90' | Stadium: Kenilworth Road; Attendance: 11,146 |

| 1 April 1989 33 | Tottenham Hotspur | 3–0 | West Ham United | Tottenham |
| | Nayim 41'; Fenwick 82'; Stewart 88' | | | Stadium: White Hart Lane; Attendance: 28,375 |

| 12 April 1989 34 | Tottenham Hotspur | 0–0 | Sheffield Wednesday | Tottenham |
| | | | | Stadium: White Hart Lane; Attendance: 17,270 |

| 15 April 1989 35 | Wimbledon | 1–2 | Tottenham Hotspur | Wimbledon |
| | Young 71' | | Stewart 33'; Waddle 61' | Stadium: Plough Lane; Attendance: 12,366 |

| 22 April 1989 36 | Tottenham Hotspur | 2–1 | Everton | Tottenham |
| | Walsh 69', 89' | | McDonald 83' | Stadium: White Hart Lane; Attendance: 28,568 |

| 29 April 1989 37 | Millwall | 0–5 | Tottenham Hotspur | New Cross |
| | | | Walsh 18'; Stewart 31', 75', 90'; Samways 82' | Stadium: The Den; Attendance: 16,551 |

| 13 May 1989 38 | Queens Park Rangers | 1–0 | Tottenham Hotspur | Shepherd's Bush |
| | Falco 85' | | | Stadium: Loftus Road; Attendance: 21,873 |

=== FA Cup ===
As part of the first division, Tottenham automatically qualified through to the third round of the FA Cup where they was drawn to meet Division Two side Bradford City.

| 7 January 1989 Third round | Bradford City | 1–0 | Tottenham Hotspur | Bradford |
| | Mitchell | | | Stadium: Valley Parade; Attendance: 15,917 |

=== Football League Cup ===
As part of the first division, Tottenham started the League Cup in the second round where they were drawn to meet third division side, Notts County.

| 27 September 1988 Second round First leg | Notts County | 1–1 | Tottenham Hotspur | Nottingham |
| | Birtles | | Samways | Stadium: Meadow Lane; Attendance: 9,279 |

| 11 October 1988 Second round Second leg | Tottenham Hotspur | 2–1 (3–2 agg.) | Tottenham Hotspur | Tottenham |
| | Gascoigne; Fenwick | | Thorpe | Stadium: White Hart Lane; Attendance: 14,953 |

| 1 November 1988 Third round | Tottenham Hotspur | 0–0 | Blackburn Rovers | Tottenham |
| 19:45 GMT | | | | Stadium: White Hart Lane; Attendance: 18,814; Referee: Terry Holbrook |

| 9 November 1988 Third round replay | Blackburn Rovers | 1–2 (a.e.t.) | Tottenham Hotspur | Blackburn |
| | Butters 109' (o.g.) | | Thomas 106'; Stewart 110' | Stadium: Ewood Park; Attendance: 12,965 |

| 29 November 1988 Fourth round | Southampton | 2–1 | Tottenham Hotspur | Southampton |
| 19:30 GMT | Cockerill; Moore | | Osman (o.g.) | Stadium: The Dell; Attendance: 17,375; Referee: Keren Barratt |

== Statistics ==
=== Appearances ===
Last updated: 1 April 2024.

| Pos. | Name | First Division | | FA Cup | | League Cup | | Total | |
| Pos. | Name | Apps | Goals | Apps | Goals | Apps | Goals | Apps | Goals |
Goalkeepers
| GK | (England) Bobby Mimms | 20 | 0 | 1 | 0 | 5 | 0 | 26 | 0 |
| GK | (Norway) Erik Thorstvedt | 18 | 0 | 0 | 0 | 0 | 0 | 18 | 0 |
Defenders
| DF | (Iceland) Guðni Bergsson | 8 | 0 | 1 | 0 | 0 | 0 | 9 | 0 |
| DF | (England) Guy Butters | 27+1 | 1 | 1 | 0 | 1+1 | 0 | 29+2 | 1 |
| DF | (England) Chris Fairclough | 20 | 1 | 1 | 0 | 4 | 0 | 25 | 1 |
| DF | (England) Terry Fenwick | 34 | 8 | 1 | 0 | 5 | 1 | 40 | 9 |
| DF | (Republic of Ireland) Chris Hughton | 20+1 | 0 | 0+1 | 0 | 0 | 0 | 20+2 | 0 |
| DF | (England) Gary Mabbutt | 38 | 1 | 1 | 0 | 5 | 0 | 44 | 1 |
| DF | (England) John Polston | 0+3 | 0 | 0 | 0 | 0 | 0 | 0+3 | 0 |
| DF | (England) Brian Statham | 6 | 0 | 0 | 0 | 2 | 0 | 8 | 0 |
| DF | (England) Gary Stevens | 5 | 0 | 0 | 0 | 2 | 0 | 7 | 0 |
| DF | (England) Mark Stimson | 0+1 | 0 | 0 | 0 | 0 | 0 | 0+1 | 0 |
| DF | (England) Mitchell Thomas | 22+3 | 1 | 1 | 0 | 5 | 1 | 28+3 | 2 |
Midfielders
| MF | (England) Paul Allen | 35+2 | 1 | 0 | 0 | 5 | 0 | 41+2 | 1 |
| MF | (England) Paul Gascoigne | 31+1 | 6 | 0 | 0 | 5 | 1 | 36+1 | 7 |
| MF | (England) David Howells | 12+15 | 3 | 0 | 0 | 0+1 | 0 | 12+16 | 3 |
| MF | (England) John Moncur | 0+1 | 0 | 0 | 0 | 0 | 0 | 0+1 | 0 |
| MF | (Spain) Nayim | 8+3 | 2 | 0 | 0 | 0 | 0 | 8+3 | 2 |
| MF | (England) Mark Robson | 3+2 | 0 | 0 | 0 | 0 | 0 | 3+2 | 0 |
| MF | (England) Vinny Samways | 12+7 | 3 | 0 | 0 | 3+2 | 1 | 15+9 | 4 |
| MF | (England) Paul Stewart | 29+1 | 12 | 1 | 0 | 4 | 1 | 34+1 | 13 |
| MF | (England) Chris Waddle | 38 | 14 | 1 | 0 | 5 | 0 | 44 | 14 |
Forwards
| FW | (Northern Ireland) Phil Gray | 0+1 | 0 | 0 | 0 | 0 | 0 | 0+1 | 0 |
| FW | (England) Paul Moran | 4+4 | 0 | 0+1 | 0 | 1+1 | 0 | 5+6 | 0 |
| FW | (England) Paul Walsh | 28+5 | 6 | 1 | 0 | 3 | 0 | 32+5 | 6 |

=== Goal scorers ===
Last updated: 1 April 2024.

| Rnk | Pos | Player | First Division | FA Cup | League Cup | Total |
|---|---|---|---|---|---|---|
| 1 | MF | (England) Chris Waddle | 14 | 0 | 0 | 14 |
| 2 | MF | (England) Paul Stewart | 12 | 0 | 1 | 13 |
| 3 | DF | (England) Terry Fenwick | 8 | 0 | 1 | 9 |
| 4 | MF | (England) Paul Gascoigne | 6 | 0 | 1 | 7 |
| 5 | FW | (England) Paul Walsh | 6 | 0 | 0 | 6 |
| 6 | MF | (England) Vinny Samways | 3 | 0 | 1 | 4 |
| 7 | MF | (England) David Howells | 3 | 0 | 0 | 3 |
| 8 | MF | (Spain) Nayim | 2 | 0 | 0 | 2 |
| 8 | DF | (England) Mitchell Thomas | 1 | 0 | 1 | 2 |
| 9 | MF | (England) Paul Allen | 1 | 0 | 0 | 1 |
| 9 | MF | (England) Guy Butters | 1 | 0 | 0 | 1 |
| 9 | FW | (England) Chris Fairclough | 1 | 0 | 0 | 1 |
| 9 | DF | (England) Gary Mabbutt | 1 | 0 | 0 | 1 |
| Total | | | 59 | 1 | 5 | 74 |

=== Clean sheets ===
Last updated: 1 April 2024.

| Rnk | Player | First Division | FA Cup | League Cup | Total |
|---|---|---|---|---|---|
| 1 | (England) Bobby Mimms | 5 | 0 | 1 | 6 |
| 2 | (Norway) Erik Thorstvedt | 5 | 0 | 0 | 5 |
| Total | | 10 | 0 | 1 | 11 |

== See also ==
- 1988–89 in English football
- List of Tottenham Hotspur F.C. seasons
