= 1991 FA Charity Shield =

- The match programme cover.
Arsenal	Tottenham Hotspur
0	0
- Date: 10 August 1991
- Venue: Wembley Stadium, London
- Referee: Terry Holbrook (Staffordshire)
- Attendance: 65,483

The 1991 FA Charity Shield (also known as the Tennent's FA Charity Shield for sponsorship reasons) was the 69th FA Charity Shield, the annual football match contested by the reigning champions of the Football League First Division and the holders of the FA Cup. It was held at Wembley Stadium, on 10 August 1991. The game was played between Arsenal, champions of the 1990–91 Football League and Tottenham Hotspur, who won the 1990–91 FA Cup. This was Arsenal's twelfth Charity Shield appearance and Tottenham Hotspur's ninth.

Arsenal began the match the brighter of the two teams, dominating in possession and the number of chances created. Tottenham created their best chance to score in the first half, but struggled to find a breakthrough in the second half, hardly troubling the Arsenal defence. With neither team able to score after 90 minutes, the match ended in a draw, meaning each team would hold the trophy for six months. This was the last Shield edition to have shared winners.

== Background ==
Arsenal qualified for the 1991 FA Charity Shield, by virtue of winning the 1990–91 Football League First Division, having lost one match – away to Chelsea – in the entire campaign. The club's previous Charity Shield appearances, eleven in total, resulted in seven wins (1930, 1931, 1933, 1934, 1938, 1948, 1953) and four losses (1935, 1936, 1979, 1989). Tottenham Hotspur qualified as holders of the FA Cup, beating Nottingham Forest 2–1 in the 1991 FA Cup Final. They appeared in eight previous shields, winning four outright (1921, 1951, 1961, 1962), sharing two (1967, 1981) and losing two (1920, 1982).

The last meeting between both teams was in the FA Cup; Tottenham Hotspur won 3–1 in the semi-final at Wembley Stadium. Tottenham were the only league opponents to avoid defeat against Arsenal, with neither side scoring in the two matches played. Manager Peter Shreeves noted the importance of the match, given this was a North London derby, but stressed there "will be more important objectives this season." This was the first all-London encounter in the 83-year history of the Shield. This would be the last time either team was to share the trophy, as new regulations were brought in a year later that allowed for extra time and subsequently a penalty shootout if a draw occurred in normal time.

== Match ==
Anders Limpar was the main absentee for Arsenal, having sustained a knee injury, on duty for the Sweden national team. David O'Leary started in place of the injured Steve Bould; midfielder David Hillier was selected ahead of Michael Thomas in Limpar's place on the left wing. Tottenham defender Terry Fenwick, recovered from a double leg break, replaced Justin Edinburgh in the first eleven. Without Paul Gascoigne, injured in the FA Cup final, Tottenham employed a five-man midfield with Gary Lineker as the sole striker.

=== Summary ===
Arsenal began brightly in front of a crowd of 65,483, creating the first chance of the match in the 17th minute. Paul Davis set up striker Kevin Campbell, who hooked the ball high over goal. Four minutes later, Alan Smith headed the ball into the goal net, meeting a cross from Paul Merson; it was ruled out by referee Terry Holbrook for offside. Tottenham improved shortly after, with Gary Mabbutt heading the ball directly at Arsenal goalkeeper David Seaman to create their first chance of the match. Their best opportunity to score was in the 36th minute. Vinny Samways set up Gary Lineker to break past the Arsenal defence. Having nudged the ball past Tony Adams, Lineker looked up, before making a cross for Nayim to head; the shot was acrobatically saved by Seaman's right foot.

Early in the second half, Tottenham's Pat van den Hauwe was cautioned by Holbrook for getting tangled with Arsenal's David Rocastle, in spite Rocastle indicating that the player used an elbow – a bookable offence. Moments after, Rocastle was shown a yellow card for attempting to get his own back on Van Den Hauwe, by tackling the player without intent. Van Den Hauwe was later booked for a wild challenge on Lee Dixon. Arsenal dominated possession during the second half, with Tottenham infrequently troubling their opponent's defence and relying on counterattacks to fashion goal-scoring chances. Smith had a chance saved in the 75th minute by goalkeeper Erik Thorstvedt, when the ball was back-passed across the penalty area by Steve Sedgley. In the final seconds of the match substitute Andy Cole, who had replaced Campbell, shot from 20 yards and into the side-netting.

=== Details ===
10 August 1991
15:00 BST

Arsenal	0–0	Tottenham Hotspur

Wembley Stadium, London
Attendance: 65,483
Referee: Terry Holbrook (Staffordshire)

Arsenal	Tottenham Hotspur

GK	1	(England) David Seaman
RB	2	(England) Lee Dixon
LB	3	(England) Nigel Winterburn
CM	4	(England) David Hillier
CB	5	(Republic of Ireland) David O'Leary
CB	6	(England) Tony Adams (c)
RM	7	(England) David Rocastle	Booked	(substituted off) 79'
CM	8	(England) Paul Davis
CF	9	(England) Alan Smith
LM	10	(England) Paul Merson
CF	11	(England) Kevin Campbell		(substituted off) 79'
Substitutes:
GK		(England) Alan Miller
DF		(England) Andy Linighan
MF	14	(England) Michael Thomas		(substituted on) 79'
MF		(Iceland) Sigurður Jónsson
CF	15	(England) Andy Cole		(substituted on) 79'
Manager:
(Scotland) George Graham

GK	1	(Norway) Erik Thorstvedt
RB	2	(England) Terry Fenwick
LB	3	(Wales) Pat Van Den Hauwe (yellow card)
CB	4	(England) Steve Sedgley
CM	5	(England) David Howells
CB	6	(England) Gary Mabbutt (c)
SS	7	(England) Paul Stewart
RM	8	(Spain) Nayim
CM	9	(England) Vinny Samways
CF	10	(England) Gary Lineker
LM	11	(England) Paul Allen
Substitutes:
GK		(England) Ian Walker
CF		(England) Paul Walsh
DF		(England) Ian Hendon
DF		(Iceland) Guðni Bergsson
DF		(England) Justin Edinburgh
Manager:
(Wales) Peter Shreeves

=== Statistics ===
Statistic	Arsenal	Tottenham
Goals scored	0	0
Total shots	11	4
Shots on target	3	2
Corner kicks	9	2
Fouls committed	5	12
Offsides	4	8
Yellow cards	1	1
Red cards	0	0

== Post-match ==
Despite the draw, Shreeves was content with his team's performance. He believed the new 4–5–1 formation deployed in the match was "the system which suits us best", but admitted the midfield needed to do more to support Lineker upfront. Arsenal manager George Graham agreed that his team played below their usual standard in the first half, accepting that his team needed "to work on ... finishing" to make use of their territorial advantage.

== See also ==
- 1990–91 Football League
- 1990–91 FA Cup
