= Steve Sedgley =

English footballer (born 1968)

Personal information
- Full name: Stephen Philip Sedgley
- Date of birth: 26 May 1968 (age 58)
- Place of birth: Enfield, England
- Positions: Midfielder; defender

Senior career*
Years	Team	Apps	(Gls)
1986–1989	Coventry City	84	(3)
1989–1994	Tottenham Hotspur	164	(8)
1994–1997	Ipswich Town	105	(15)
1997–2000	Wolverhampton Wanderers	106	(9)
Total		459	(35)

International career
1987–1989	England U21	11	(2)

Managerial career
- 2001–2002: Kingstonian
- * Club domestic league appearances and goals

Stephen Philip Sedgley (born 26 May 1968) is an English former professional footballer, and football manager.

As a player, he was a midfielder and a defender. He was capped 11 times for England at under-21 level. who made more than 450 appearances in the Football League and Premier League for Coventry City, Tottenham Hotspur, Ipswich Town and Wolverhampton Wanderers. He became manager of Kingstonian in 2001, and later joined the coaching staff of Luton Town.

== Playing career ==
Sedgley was born in Enfield. He made more than 180 first-team appearances for Tottenham Hotspur as a player after a £750,000 move from Coventry City in July 1989 before switching to Ipswich Town for £1 million in June 1994. More than 100 appearances followed for Ipswich before the final move of his playing career, a £500,000 transfer to Wolverhampton Wanderers in July 1997, where he again made more than 100 league appearances before retiring from the game in December 2000. He has two FA Cup-winners' medals. The first came with Coventry, as an unused substitute in the 3–2 defeat of Spurs in the 1987 final. He received his second in 1991 when he was in the starting XI for Spurs, as they beat Nottingham Forest 2–1 after extra time.

== Coaching career ==
Sedgley was appointed manager of Kingstonian in October 2001, stepping up from the position of coach, but resigned 14 months later, citing "a clash of opinions off the pitch with the club's owners". A UEFA-qualified coach, Sedgley was appointed as a youth team coach at Luton Town in mid-October 2005 where he worked alongside Marvin Johnson until new manager Kevin Blackwell brought in his own backroom staff in 2007.

== Honours ==
Coventry City

- FA Cup: 1986–87

Tottenham Hotspur

- FA Cup: 1990–91
- FA Charity Shield: 1991 (Shared)
