= John Hendry (footballer) =

Scottish footballer

Personal information
- Full name: John Michael Hendry
- Date of birth: 6 January 1970 (age 56)
- Place of birth: Glasgow, Scotland
- Position: Forward

Youth career
- 1987–1988: Hillington Youth Club

Senior career*
Years	Team	Apps	(Gls)
1988–1990	Dundee	2	(0)
1990	→ Forfar Athletic (loan)	10	(6)
1990–1995	Tottenham Hotspur	17	(5)
1992	→ Charlton Athletic (loan)	5	(1)
1994	→ Swansea City (loan)	8	(2)
1995–1998	Motherwell	36	(3)
1998	Stirling Albion	6	(2)
- Pollok
- * Club domestic league appearances and goals

John Michael Hendry (born 6 January 1970) is a Scottish football forward.

Hendry began his career at Dundee before joining English side Tottenham Hotspur in 1990. In April 1991 he scored on his debut in an away defeat at Carrow Road versus Norwich City. A few weeks later he scored a memorable goal, equalising against Manchester United at Old Trafford on the last day of the 1990–91 season, two days after Tottenham had won the 1991 FA Cup Final. Two years later he had a similar impact as Tottenham played rivals Arsenal at Highbury on the last day of the 1992–93 season; Hendry scored twice as Tottenham won 3–1, though Arsenal had rested players ahead of their participation in the 1993 FA Cup Final.
