= David Allison (referee) =

English football referee (born 1948)

- Full name: David B Allison
- Born: 27 September 1948 (age 78); Lancashire, England
- Other occupation: Teacher

Domestic
Years	League	Role
1977-1980	Football League	Linesman
1980-1992	Football League	Referee
1992-1997	Premier League	Referee

David B. Allison (born 27 September 1948) is an English former football referee, who operated in the English Football League and Premier League. During his time on the List he was based in Lancaster and was by profession a teacher.

== Career ==
Allison became a Football League linesman in 1977 and three years later achieved promotion to the referees' list at the age of thirty-one. He made steady progress in his early years but by the late 1980s was becoming a regular top division referee, often handling Lancashire derby games including those involving the big Manchester and Liverpool clubs.

In 1992, he became one of the first Premier League referees,^{†} shortly after taking charge of his most senior cup appointment - a League Cup semi-final first leg between Nottingham Forest and Tottenham Hotspur. His first match in that competition was the 4–1 home win by Middlesbrough against Leeds United at Ayresome Park on 28 August.

Over the next two years he handled a large number of matches in the new League. However, in 1994 the Premier League moved to a rather smaller list of officials who would handle its matches and he was not selected.

Allison reverted to exclusive duty in the Football League, where his appointments included the 1996 Division One play-off final between Leicester City and Crystal Palace, which he rated his most memorable match. He retired at the end of the following season (1996–97). In his seventeen years as a referee he controlled 463 matches in the Football and Premier Leagues.

Allison later became a Football League regional co-ordinator and referees' coach, before being appointed National Group Manager in charge of the 57 top referees for Professional Game Match Officials Limited on 10 August 2007.

Allison is also the Training Officer for the Lancaster & Morecambe Referees' Society.

== Personal life ==
David Allison has two daughters, Penelope Anne and Lucy. He currently lives with his partner, Sheila, and has two step-grandchildren named Heather and Emma.

Allison was also a teacher of languages but has since retired due to family reasons.
