= Vinny Samways =

English footballer (born 1968)

Personal information
- Full name: Vincent Samways
- Date of birth: 27 October 1968 (age 58)
- Place of birth: Bethnal Green, London, England
- Height: 5 ft 8 in (1.73 m)
- Position: Central midfielder

Senior career*
Years	Team	Apps	(Gls)
1986–1994	Tottenham Hotspur	193	(11)
1994–1996	Everton	23	(2)
1995–1996	→ Wolverhampton Wanderers (loan)	3	(0)
1996	→ Birmingham City (loan)	12	(0)
1996–2002	Las Palmas	160	(6)
2002–2003	Sevilla	10	(0)
2003–2004	Walsall	42	(2)
2004–2005	Algeciras	18	(1)
Total		461	(22)

International career
1985–1986	England Youth	5	(0)
1988	England U21	5	(1)

Managerial career
- 2006–2008: UD San Pedro
- * Club domestic league appearances and goals

Vincent Samways (born 27 October 1968) is an English former professional footballer and manager who played as a central midfielder from 1986 until 2006.

He notably played in the Premier League for Tottenham Hotspur and Everton. He also played in the Football League for Wolverhampton Wanderers, Birmingham City and Walsall, and in Spain for Sevilla, Las Palmas and Algeciras. After retiring he went on to manage Spanish lower league side UD San Pedro.

== Club career ==
Samways began his football career in Tottenham Hotspur's youth system. He won the FA Cup with Tottenham in 1991, and helped them reach the semi-finals of the competition in 1993. He was a regular player in the side which reached the quarter-finals of the European Cup Winners' Cup during the 1991–92 season.

Samways was put on the transfer list in the 1992 close season, but was taken off it at his own request and spent a further two seasons at White Hart Lane.

He joined Everton in 1994, and was part of the Everton squad that reached the 1995 FA Cup Final, but Samways was left out of the team for the final itself. He did however score the only goal of the 1995 Charity Shield to defeat league champions Blackburn Rovers. In the 1995–96 season, he spent time on loan at Division One sides Wolverhampton Wanderers and Birmingham City.

Unable to settle at Everton, Samways enjoyed a degree of success in Spain with UD Las Palmas during the late 1990s and early 2000s, where he was team captain and played a key role in the Canary Islands side. In 2002–03, he played ten league games with Sevilla FC, becoming the first Englishman to play in the Sevilla derby against Real Betis. He then returned to England, where he spent the 2003–04 season with Walsall in Division One.

He then went back to Spain, joining lower league side Algeciras CF, and retired in 2005, aged 36.

== Coaching career ==
After retiring Samways went on to manage Spanish lower league side San Pedro.

== Personal life ==
Samways was born in Bethnal Green, London.

== Honours ==
Tottenham Hotspur

- FA Cup: 1990–91
- FA Charity Shield: 1991 (shared)

Everton

- FA Cup: 1994–95
- FA Charity Shield: 1995
