= Gary Mabbutt =

English footballer (born 1961)

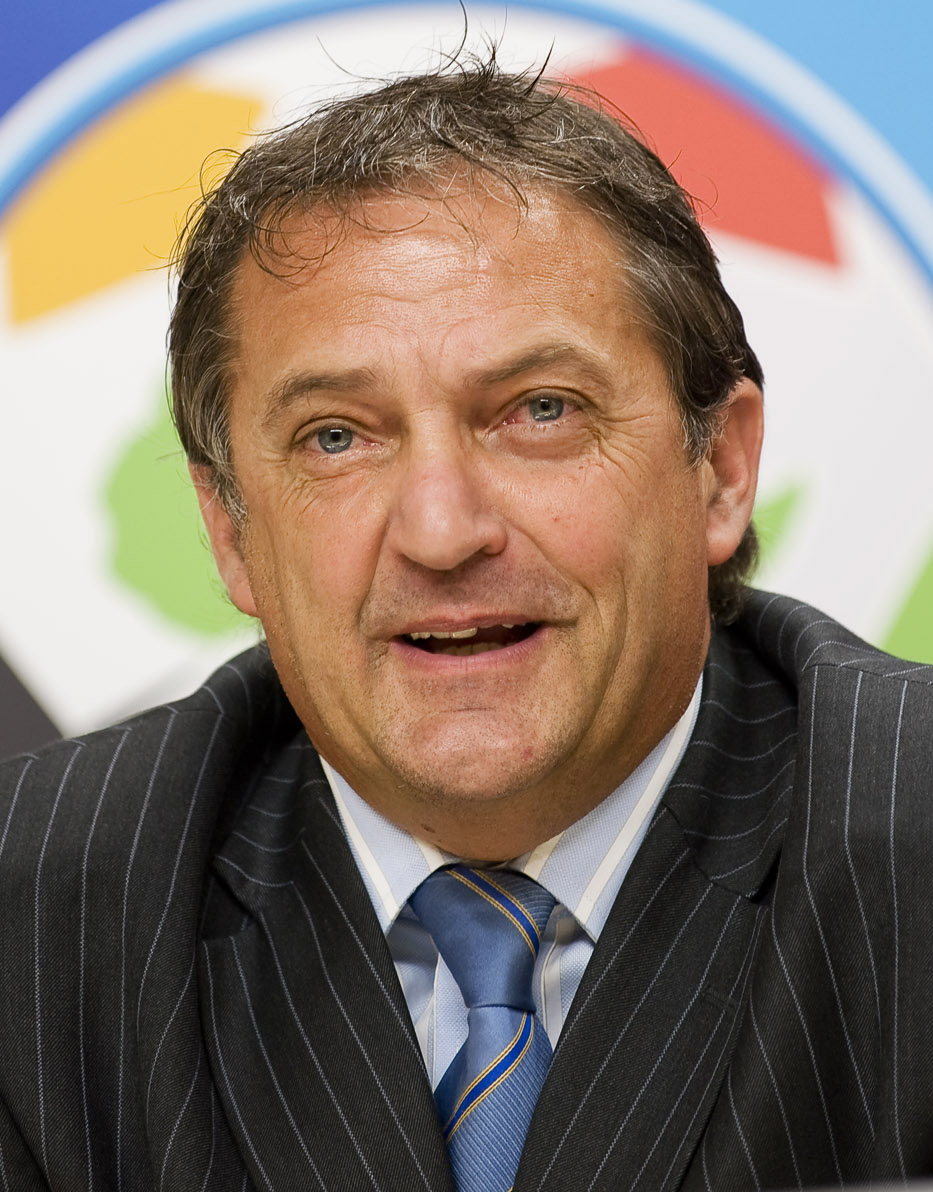
- Mabbutt in 2009

Personal information
- Full name: Gary Vincent Mabbutt
- Date of birth: 23 August 1961 (age 65)
- Place of birth: Bristol, England
- Height: 5 ft 10 in (1.78 m)
- Position: Defender

Senior career*
Years	Team	Apps	(Gls)
1978–1982	Bristol Rovers	131	(10)
1982–1998	Tottenham Hotspur	477	(27)
Total		608	(37)

International career
1979–1980	England Youth	11	(2)
1982–1986	England U21	7	(2)
1982–1992	England	16	(1)
1984–1992	England B	9	(1)
- * Club domestic league appearances and goals

Gary Vincent Mabbutt MBE (born 23 August 1961) is an English former footballer who made more than 750 professional appearances, first playing for Bristol Rovers and going on to play 619 games for Tottenham Hotspur, despite being diagnosed with type 1 diabetes at 17. During his career he also won 16 caps for the England national team. He mostly played in central defence but was a versatile player who excelled also in midfield, winning both the 1984 UEFA Cup and 1991 FA Cup.

== Career ==
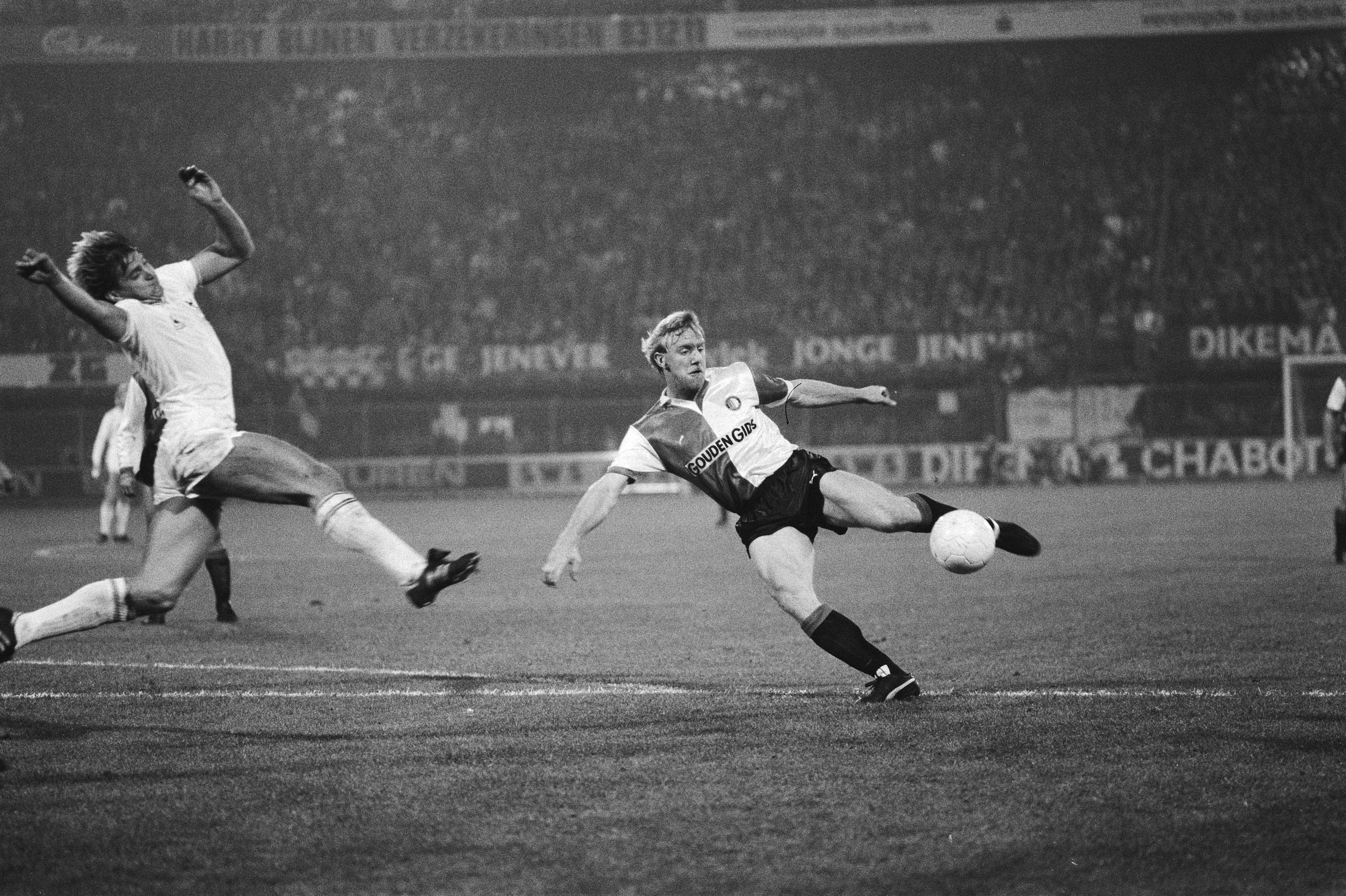
Gary Mabbutt (left) playing for Tottenham Hotspur in 1983

Mabbutt is best remembered for his 16-year spell at Tottenham Hotspur, where he played from 1982 until 1998, and was the club captain for 11 years from 1987 to 1998.

He became one of the best known defenders in English football in the 1980s, playing initially for Bristol Rovers before joining the first division club Tottenham Hotspur, where he became captain and won 16 caps for England, scoring against Yugoslavia in 1986.

He scored on his Tottenham debut in a 2–2 draw with Luton Town at White Hart Lane. With Spurs, he won the UEFA Cup in 1984, and captained them to victory in the 1991 FA Cup Final. In the 1987 FA Cup Final against Coventry City, Mabbutt had an eventful game where he scored Spurs' second goal to put them 2–1 up but, after Coventry had equalised to force extra time, he scored an own goal to give Coventry a 3–2 win. This incident led to him being held as something of a folk hero at Coventry City, with a fanzine being named Gary Mabbutt's Knee.

Having sustained a fractured skull and eye socket in November 1993 from Wimbledon striker John Fashanu's elbow in an aerial challenge, an injury after which he became the first player to wear a protective mask on the pitch even after a three-month absence, he suffered a broken leg on the opening day of the 1996–97 season and did not return until the following campaign, at the end of which he retired from playing after 16 years at White Hart Lane. By this stage, he was the club's second longest-serving player. His final appearance for the club came against Southampton on the last day of the 1997–98 season.

== Personal life ==
Mabbutt was born in Bristol. His father is Ray Mabbutt and his brother is Kevin Mabbutt. He is married to Kathy, and has two daughters. Mabbutt has type 1 diabetes, and became an icon for many children with the condition. He famously appeared on the BBC's children's television programme Blue Peter where he demonstrated injecting insulin into an orange to show how he dealt with his condition on a daily basis. In 2013, Mabbutt had surgery to save his left leg, following a bout of peripheral arterial disease, brought on by his diabetes. Following the surgery, he can no longer run or kick a ball.

Mabbutt was appointed a Member of the Order of the British Empire (MBE) in the 1994 New Year Honours for services to football. Mabbutt was awarded an Hon. Master of Science degree from the University of Hertfordshire in 1998, an Hon. Doctor of Health degree from the University of Bath in 2018 and an Hon. Doctor of Law degree from the University of Bristol in 2019. He served as an ambassador for the 2010 World Cup Finals in South Africa. He is also working with the Deloitte Street Child World Cup, training and encouraging street children and ex-street children in football and for street children's rights in Durban, South Africa. This is run by the Amos Trust. He is a Global Club Ambassador for Tottenham Hotspur and the English Football Association, an Ambassador for the Prince's Trust and Hon. Vice-President of Diabetes UK.

In 2018, Mabbutt had part of his foot eaten by a rat. While on holiday with his daughter in the Kruger National Park, in South Africa, Mabbutt, who has little feeling in his feet due to diabetic neuropathy, awoke to find a rat had eaten part of his foot and had bitten one toe to the bone. He was forced to fly back to the UK for surgery and spent a week in hospital.

== Honours ==
Tottenham Hotspur

- FA Cup: 1990–91; runner-up: 1986–87
- FA Charity Shield: 1991 (shared)
- UEFA Cup: 1983–84

England U21

- UEFA European Under-21 Championship: 1984

Orders

- Member of the Order of the British Empire: 1994
