= Paul Moran (English footballer) =

English footballer

Personal information
- Date of birth: 23 May 1968 (age 58)
- Place of birth: Enfield, England
- Height: 5 ft 10 in (1.78 m)
- Position: Forward

Senior career*
Years	Team	Apps	(Gls)
1985–1994	Tottenham Hotspur	36	(2)
1989	→ Portsmouth (loan)	3	(0)
1989	→ Leicester City (loan)	10	(1)
1991	→ Newcastle United (loan)	1	(0)
1991	→ Southend United (loan)	1	(0)
1994–?	Peterborough United	7	(0)
- Enfield
- Boreham Wood
- Enfield
- Hertford Town
- * Club domestic league appearances and goals

Paul Moran (born 23 May 1968) is an English retired football forward.
