= David Howells =

English footballer (born 1967)

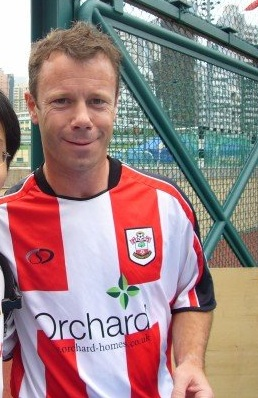
- Howells in 2007

Personal information
- Date of birth: 15 December 1967 (age 58)
- Place of birth: Guildford, England
- Height: 5 ft 11 in (1.80 m)
- Position: Midfielder

Youth career
- 1980–1985: Tottenham Hotspur

Senior career*
Years	Team	Apps	(Gls)
1985–1998	Tottenham Hotspur	277	(22)
1998–2000	Southampton	9	(1)
1999	→ Bristol City (loan)	8	(1)
2001–2003	Hartley Wintney		
2003–2004	Havant & Waterlooville		
2004–2006	Guildford City	17	(3)
Total		294	(24)

International career
1985	England U17	4	(1)
1986	England Youth	4	(0)
- * Club domestic league appearances and goals

David Howells (born 15 December 1967) is an English football coach and former professional footballer.

As a player, he was a midfielder who notably played in the Premier League for Tottenham Hotspur and Southampton. He played 277 times for Spurs in the league and scored 22 goals, winning the FA Cup in 1991. He also played in the Football League with Bristol City, before finishing his career in non-league football with Hartley Wintney, Havant & Waterlooville and Guildford City.

Following retirement, he was director of football at Guildford City, has worked as an agent and is now a secondary school teacher at Farnham Heath End School.

== Football career ==
Born in Guildford, Surrey, Howells made his debut for Tottenham Hotspur as an 18-year-old in 1986, scoring in a 2–1 win against Sheffield Wednesday. He spent 12 more seasons at White Hart Lane, made 335 first-team appearances, and was on the winning side in the 1991 FA Cup final. Howells also represented Southampton, scoring once against Arsenal, and Bristol City before retiring from the game in 2000 due to a persistent knee problem.

== Later career ==
He went on to run holiday resort-based soccer schools, was involved with Guildford City as director of football and occasional player, appeared for Havant & Waterlooville, coached at Westfield (Surrey), and became a director of a sports agency.

Howells used to teach at Queen Eleanor's junior school in Guildford. He was subsequently appointed head coach of the first XI at Charterhouse. He now teaches at Farnham Heath End School.

== Personal life ==
Howells has a younger brother, Gareth, who is also a professional footballer, playing in goal. As of 2010–11 season, Gareth was a player/coach at Eastleigh FC. Like his brother, Gareth was originally signed on youth terms at Tottenham, but never made the step up to play professionally for the club, and has spent almost his entire career at clubs outside of the Football League structure. Howells also had 2 wives, one called Debbie (who he was married to until 2005) and Sally, who is still his wife to this day. Howells managed 3 children, Stuart (being the oldest), Eden (being the middle child) and Hudson (who is the youngest of the bunch). All three children were inspired by football but only Hudson decided he wanted to play for a team (see Churt page for more info).

== Honours ==
Tottenham Hotspur

- FA Cup: 1990–91
