= Irving Scholar =

British businessman and former owner of Tottenham Hotspur

Irving Alan Scholar (born November 1947) is a British property developer and former investor in football clubs, most noted for his time as chairman of Tottenham Hotspur and as a director of Nottingham Forest.

As chairman of Tottenham, Scholar became known for a number of innovations in the commercialisation of the club, such as floating it on the stock market in October 1983, innovations that were copied by other football clubs. He was also instrumental in pushing for higher fees paid by television companies for rights to broadcast football matches. The financial imperative would eventually led to the formation of the Premier League with Tottenham one of the five prime movers who pushed for its formation. Tottenham won a UEFA Cup and a FA Cup with him at the helm, but his chairmanship at the club ended with heavy financial losses and the club was sold to Alan Sugar and Terry Venables.

== Early career ==
Scholar was a surveyor and became a property developer and business executive. He made his money through a company associated with European Ferries called Townsend Thoresen Properties. He then moved to Monte Carlo for tax reasons.

== Tottenham Hotspur ==
In 1981, Scholar, a lifelong supporter of Tottenham, turned up at a meeting at Tottenham with the intention of leasing a box in the West Stand of White Hart Lane that was to be rebuilt by 1982. However, Scholar became convinced that the club would get into financial trouble over the rebuilding of the stand, and as a fan with a keen interest in the club's fortune, he started buying up shares in the club from various shareholders in order to get into the boardroom. At that time there was a rift in the boardroom between former chairmen Arthur Richardson and Sidney Wale, and Scholar persuaded Wale to sell his shares, buying up 25% of the club for £600,000. Together with the help of Paul Bobroff who had bought 15% of shares from the family of a previous chairman Fred Bearman, he took control in December 1982 from the Richardson and Wale families who had been major shareholders for many years. After he took over, Douglas Alexiou, the only remaining member of the previous board, was made chairman, but later in 1984 Scholar took over the position of chairman.

Scholar inherited a club in debt to the tune of nearly £5 million, what was then the largest debt in English football, but a rights issue after he took over brought in a million pounds. As chairman of Spurs, Scholar worked closely with fellow property developer Paul Bobroff and they diversified the club into other areas such as computing and the clothing firms Hummel UK and Martex, merchandising as well as floating on the London Stock Exchange, with Spurs becoming the first sports club in the world to float on any stock exchange. Scholar played a significant role in the commercialisation of English football clubs, and his activities in these areas would later see him branded a visionary in a 2001 BBC documentary The Men Who Changed Football, as merchandising and stock market flotation would later become popular for football clubs. Manchester United in particular hired a former Spurs executive involved and became the most successful English club in merchandising their brand. The commercial imperative would also lead to the formation of the Premier League with Scholar one of the prime movers who pushed for its formation.

At that time, the television companies operated a cartel to keep the broadcast fees for football on television low, but Scholar persuaded the major clubs that the television companies should be made to pay considerably more for their coverage of football matches. In the ensuing dispute over broadcast fees with the television companies, no matches were broadcast for a few months in the 1985–86 season. According to Scholar who was involved in the negotiations of television deals, each of the First Division clubs received only around £25,000 per year from television rights before 1986, this increased to around £50,000 in the 1986 negotiation (worth £6.3 million to the Football League in a two-year deal), then to £600,000 in 1988 (£44 million in total over four years). Broadcast rights would later become a significant part of the income of English football clubs in the Premier League era with deals reaching several billions.

By the autumn of 1990, however, Scholar's Tottenham faced financial troubles due to investment in new players, the refurbishment of the East Stand in 1989 at the club's White Hart Lane ground, and losses in the companies he had created with Tottenham. Scholar looked to Robert Maxwell to help bail the club out. Maxwell agreed to support a rights issue, but he soon backed out and instead loaned £1.1 million to the club with the proviso that the deal be kept secret. When news of the deal came out, Tottenham were left in turmoil and a struggle for power broke out between Scholar and Bobroff. Scholar eventually prevailed and Bobroff was forced to resign. Terry Venables then sought a number of backers in his attempts to buy the club, eventually teaming up with Alan Sugar. Scholar finally sold his shares in the club for £2 million and left in the summer of 1991, a couple of months after the club won the FA Cup for the eighth time. Scholar spoke a couple of weeks later to writer Alex Fynn and predicted that the Sugar-Venables marriage would last a short time, stating "The first year will be the honeymoon, the second will be the divorce". Venables was thrown out of Spurs exactly two years later, in the summer of 1993, contributing to a highly public slanging match and bringing a court case against Sugar, which he lost. Scholar published a memoir about his time at White Hart Lane, Behind Closed Doors, in 1992 with Mihir Bose as his co-author.

== Nottingham Forest ==
Scholar became a director of Nottingham Forest in 1997, as part of a consortium that took over the club. The group also included author Phil Soar, businessman Julian Markham and Saracens F.C. chairman Nigel Wray. Irving would go on to sell some of Nottingham Forest's players behind the back of manager Dave Bassett, which led to Dutch forward Pierre van Hooijdonk going on strike. In May 1999 Nigel Doughty gained control of Forest after the club's flotation on the Alternative Investment Market, following which Scholar resigned from his directorship in June 1999, accusing other board members of a "farcical lack of professionalism". Scholar, along with Markham, subsequently lost a High Court case challenging the sale of shares in the club to Doughty.
