= Roger Milford =

British football referee (born 1940)

Roger Milford (born 1940) is an English former football referee.

He took charge of the 1991 FA Cup Final between Tottenham Hotspur and Nottingham Forest. His final match as a referee was the 1994 First Division Playoff Final, in which Leicester City defeated Derby County.

As of 2002, he was working for The FA as an assessor.

As of October 2014 he was listed as being the Senior Referee Coach at the Gloucestershire FA.
