= 1990–91 FA Cup =

Tournament details
- Country: England; Wales

Final positions
- Champions: Tottenham Hotspur (8th title)
- Runners-up: Nottingham Forest

Tournament statistics
- Top goal scorer: Paul Gascoigne (6)

The 1990–91 FA Cup was the 110th season of the world's oldest knockout football competition, the Football Association Challenge Cup, or FA Cup for short. Tottenham Hotspur won the competition after coming from 1–0 behind in the final against Nottingham Forest to win 2–1 and take the trophy. It gave Tottenham their eighth victory in nine FA Cup Finals and their first since their wins in 1981 and 1982.

== Qualifying rounds ==
Most participating clubs that were not members of the Football League competed in the qualifying rounds to secure one of 28 places available in the first round.

The winners from the fourth qualifying round were Fleetwood Town, Stafford Rangers, Witton Albion, Altrincham, Chorley, Spennymoor United, Bishop Auckland, Whitley Bay, Runcorn, Aylesbury United, Tamworth, Halesowen Town, Telford United, Barnet, Atherstone United, Chelmsford City, Boston United, Kidderminster Harriers, Yeovil Town, Farnborough Town, Littlehampton Town, Tiverton Town, Woking, Hayes, Wycombe Wanderers, Merthyr Tydfil, Welling United and Cheltenham Town.

Appearing in the competition proper for the first time were Littlehampton Town and Tiverton Town, while Fleetwood Town had not featured in the first round since 1980–81 and Witton Albion had not done so since 1966-67. All other successful qualifiers had participated in the main draw of the Cup on at least one occasion in the previous five seasons.

Curiously, this would be the last time (as of 2025) that Wycombe Wanderers featured in the FA Cup qualifying rounds. Awarded byes to the first round in the next two seasons, the club would be promoted into the Football League in 1993. Again as of 2025, they are the only club to have joined the League via promotion in the 20th century and enjoyed continuous membership since.

== First round proper ==
The 48 teams from the Football League Third and Fourth Divisions entered in this round along with the 28 non-league clubs from the qualifying rounds and Barrow, Leek Town, Colchester United and Sutton United who were given byes. The first round of games were played over the weekend 17–18 November 1990, with replays being played on 20–21 November. The round included three clubs from the various competitions at Step 8 of the English football system: Spennymoor United from the Northern Counties East League, Tiverton Town from the Western League, and Littlehampton Town from the Sussex County League. Spennymoor's transfer to the Northern Counties East League during the previous summer meant that this was the first Cup competition since 1970-71 in which no clubs from the Northern League qualified for the first round.

Tie no	Home team	Score	Away team	Date
1	Blackpool	2–0	Grimsby Town	17/11/1990
2	Chester City	2–2	Doncaster Rovers	17/11/1990
Replay	Doncaster Rovers	1–2	Chester City	20/11/1990
3	Chesterfield	3–2	Spennymoor United (8)	17/11/1990
4	Darlington	1–1	York City	17/11/1990
Replay	York City	1–0	Darlington	19/11/1990
5	AFC Bournemouth	2–1	Gillingham	17/11/1990
6	Barnet (5)	2–2	Chelmsford City (6)	17/11/1990
Replay	Chelmsford City	0–2	Barnet	21/11/1990
7	Preston North End	0–1	Mansfield Town	17/11/1990
8	Rochdale	1–1	Scunthorpe United	17/11/1990
Replay	Scunthorpe United	2–1	Rochdale	20/11/1990
9	Woking (6)	0–0	Kidderminster Harriers (5)	17/11/1990
Replay	Kidderminster Harriers	1–1	Woking	21/11/1990
Replay	Kidderminster Harriers	1–2	Woking	26/11/1990
10	Lincoln City	1–4	Crewe Alexandra	17/11/1990
11	Stafford Rangers (5)	1–3	Burnley	17/11/1990
12	Scarborough	0–2	Leek Town (6)	17/11/1990
13	Bishop Auckland (6)	0–1	Barrow (5)	17/11/1990
14	Chorley (6)	2–1	Bury	17/11/1990
15	Fulham	2–1	Farnborough Town (6)	17/11/1990
16	Aylesbury United (6)	0–1	Walsall	17/11/1990
17	Brentford	5–0	Yeovil Town (5)	17/11/1990
18	Maidstone United	4–1	Torquay United	17/11/1990
19	Bradford City	0–0	Shrewsbury Town	17/11/1990
Replay	Shrewsbury Town	2–1	Bradford City	21/11/1990
20	Altrincham (5)	1–2	Huddersfield Town	18/11/1990
21	Witton Albion (6)	1–2	Bolton Wanderers	17/11/1990
22	Exeter City	1–2	Cambridge United	17/11/1990
23	Cardiff City	0–0	Hayes (6)	17/11/1990
Replay	Hayes	1–0	Cardiff City	21/11/1990
24	Halifax Town	3–2	Wrexham	17/11/1990
25	Halesowen Town (6)	1–2	Tranmere Rovers	17/11/1990
26	Runcorn (5)	0–3	Hartlepool United	17/11/1990
27	Hereford United	1–1	Peterborough United	17/11/1990
Replay	Peterborough United	2–1	Hereford United	20/11/1990
28	Rotherham United	1–0	Stockport County	17/11/1990
29	Aldershot	6–2	Tiverton Town (8)	17/11/1990
30	Wigan Athletic	5–0	Carlisle United	17/11/1990
31	Tamworth (7)	4–6	Whitley Bay (7)	17/11/1990
32	Boston United (5)	1–1	Wycombe Wanderers (5)	17/11/1990
Replay	Wycombe Wanderers	4–0	Boston United	21/11/1990
33	Colchester United (5)	2–1	Reading	17/11/1990
34	Birmingham City	1–0	Cheltenham Town (5)	17/11/1990
35	Leyton Orient	3–2	Southend United	17/11/1990
36	Merthyr Tydfil (5)	1–1	Sutton United (5)	17/11/1990
Replay	Sutton United	0–1	Merthyr Tydfil	21/11/1990
37	Littlehampton Town (8)	0–4	Northampton Town	17/11/1990
38	Telford United (5)	0–0	Stoke City	17/11/1990
Replay	Stoke City	1–0	Telford United	21/11/1990
39	Swansea City	5–2	Welling United (5)	17/11/1990
40	Atherstone United (6)	3–1	Fleetwood Town (6)	17/11/1990

== Second round proper ==
The second round of games were played either over the weekend 7–8 December 1990, with replays being played on 11–12 December; or they were played in the midweek, from 10 to 12 December, with replays being played on 17 December. Whitley Bay, from the Northern Premier League First Division at Step 7 of English football, was the lowest-ranked team in the round.

Tie no	Home team	Score	Away team	Date
1	Chesterfield	3–4	Bolton Wanderers	11/12/1990
2	AFC Bournemouth	1–0	Hayes (6)	08/12/1990
3	Barnet (5)	0–0	Northampton Town	08/12/1990
Replay	Northampton Town	0–1	Barnet	12/12/1990
4	Burnley	2–0	Stoke City	12/12/1990
5	Woking (6)	5–1	Merthyr Tydfil (5)	08/12/1990
6	Crewe Alexandra	1–0	Atherstone United (6)	12/12/1990
7	Shrewsbury Town	1–0	Chorley (6)	11/12/1990
8	Wycombe Wanderers (5)	1–1	Peterborough United	12/12/1990
Replay	Peterborough United	2–0	Wycombe Wanderers	17/12/1990
9	Fulham	0–0	Cambridge United	07/12/1990
Replay	Cambridge United	2–1	Fulham	11/12/1990
10	Whitley Bay (7)	0–1	Barrow (5)	12/12/1990
11	Scunthorpe United	3–2	Tranmere Rovers	08/12/1990
12	Huddersfield Town	0–2	Blackpool	10/12/1990
13	Mansfield Town	2–1	York City	17/12/1990
14	Rotherham United	1–1	Halifax Town	11/12/1990
Replay	Halifax Town	1–2	Rotherham United	17/12/1990
15	Aldershot	2–1	Maidstone United	08/12/1990
16	Wigan Athletic	2–0	Hartlepool United	08/12/1990
17	Colchester United (5)	0–0	Leyton Orient	12/12/1990
Replay	Leyton Orient	4–1	Colchester United	17/12/1990
18	Birmingham City	1–3	Brentford	12/12/1990
19	Leek Town (6)	1–1	Chester City	12/12/1990
Replay	Chester City	4–0	Leek Town	17/12/1990
20	Swansea City	2–1	Walsall	08/12/1990

== Third round proper ==
Teams from the Football League First and Second Division entered in this round. The third round of games in the FA Cup were played over the weekend 5–7 January 1991, with replays being played on 8, 9, 16, 21 and 28 January. The lowest-ranked team in the draw, Woking from the Isthmian League Premier Division at Step 6, defeated Second Division opponents West Bromwich Albion 4–2 at The Hawthorns.

Tie no	Home team	Score	Away team	Date
1	Blackpool (4)	0–1	Tottenham Hotspur (1)	05/01/1991
2	Chester City (3)	2–3	AFC Bournemouth (3)	05/01/1991
3	Barnet (5)	0–5	Portsmouth (2)	05/01/1991
4	Burnley (4)	0–1	Manchester City (1)	06/01/1991
5	Southampton (1)	3–2	Ipswich Town (2)	05/01/1991
6	Blackburn Rovers (2)	1–1	Liverpool (1)	05/01/1991
Replay	Liverpool	3–0	Blackburn Rovers	08/01/1991
7	Aston Villa (1)	1–1	Wimbledon (1)	05/01/1991
Replay	Wimbledon	1–0	Aston Villa	09/01/1991
8	Bolton Wanderers (3)	1–0	Barrow (5)	05/01/1991
9	Wolverhampton Wanderers (2)	0–1	Cambridge United (3)	05/01/1991
10	Middlesbrough (2)	0–0	Plymouth Argyle (2)	05/01/1991
Replay	Plymouth Argyle	1–2	Middlesbrough	14/01/1991
11	West Bromwich Albion (2)	2–4	Woking (6)	05/01/1991
12	Shrewsbury Town (3)	4–1	Watford (2)	05/01/1991
13	Sheffield United (1)	1–3	Luton Town (1)	05/01/1991
14	Newcastle United (2)	2–0	Derby County (1)	05/01/1991
15	Barnsley (2)	1–1	Leeds United (1)	06/01/1991
Replay	Leeds United	4–0	Barnsley	09/01/1991
16	Bristol Rovers (2)	0–2	Crewe Alexandra (3)	05/01/1991
17	Coventry City (1)	1–1	Wigan Athletic (3)	05/01/1991
Replay	Wigan Athletic	0–1	Coventry City	09/01/1991
18	West Ham United (2)	0–0	Aldershot (4)	05/01/1991
Replay	West Ham United	6–1	Aldershot	16/01/1991
19	Brighton & Hove Albion (2)	3–2	Scunthorpe United (4)	05/01/1991
20	Manchester United (1)	2–1	Queens Park Rangers (1)	07/01/1991
21	Norwich City (1)	2–1	Bristol City (2)	05/01/1991
22	Millwall (2)	2–1	Leicester City (2)	05/01/1991
23	Hull City (2)	2–5	Notts County (2)	05/01/1991
24	Oldham Athletic (2)	3–1	Brentford (3)	05/01/1991
25	Crystal Palace (1)	0–0	Nottingham Forest (1)	06/01/1991
Replay	Nottingham Forest	2–2	Crystal Palace	21/01/1991
Replay	Nottingham Forest	3–0	Crystal Palace	28/01/1991
26	Chelsea (1)	1–3	Oxford United (2)	05/01/1991
27	Mansfield Town (3)	0–2	Sheffield Wednesday (2)	05/01/1991
28	Port Vale (2)	2–1	Peterborough United (4)	05/01/1991
29	Charlton Athletic (2)	1–2	Everton (1)	05/01/1991
30	Arsenal (1)	2–1	Sunderland (1)	05/01/1991
31	Leyton Orient (3)	1–1	Swindon Town (2)	05/01/1991
Replay	Swindon Town	1–0	Leyton Orient	21/01/1991
32	Swansea City (3)	0–0	Rotherham United (3)	05/01/1991
Replay	Rotherham United	4–0	Swansea City	21/01/1991

== Fourth round proper ==
The fourth round of games were mainly played over the weekend 26–27 January 1991, with replays being played on 29–30 January. The Arsenal-Leeds United game ended in a draw three times, with the two extra replays being played on 13 and 16 February. Because Nottingham Forest did not finish their third-round tie until 28 January, their fourth round match was not played until 13 February with a replay on 18 February. Woking was again the lowest-ranked team in the draw and, by this stage, was the last non-league club left in the competition.

Tie no	Home team	Score	Away team	Date
1	Liverpool	2–2	Brighton & Hove Albion	26/01/1991
Replay	Brighton & Hove Albion	2–3	Liverpool	30/01/1991
2	Notts County	2–0	Oldham Athletic	26/01/1991
3	Crewe Alexandra	1–0	Rotherham United	26/01/1991
4	Luton Town	1–1	West Ham United	26/01/1991
Replay	West Ham United	5–0	Luton Town	30/01/1991
5	Woking (6)	0–1	Everton	27/01/1991
6	Shrewsbury Town	1–0	Wimbledon	26/01/1991
7	Newcastle United	2–2	Nottingham Forest	13/02/1991
Replay	Nottingham Forest	3–0	Newcastle United	18/02/1991
8	Tottenham Hotspur	4–2	Oxford United	26/01/1991
9	Coventry City	1–1	Southampton	26/01/1991
Replay	Southampton	2–0	Coventry City	29/01/1991
10	Portsmouth	5–1	AFC Bournemouth	26/01/1991
11	Manchester United	1–0	Bolton Wanderers	26/01/1991
12	Norwich City	3–1	Swindon Town	26/01/1991
13	Millwall	4–4	Sheffield Wednesday	26/01/1991
Replay	Sheffield Wednesday	2–0	Millwall	30/01/1991
14	Port Vale	1–2	Manchester City	26/01/1991
15	Arsenal	0–0	Leeds United	27/01/1991
Replay	Leeds United	1–1	Arsenal	30/01/1991
Replay	Arsenal	0–0	Leeds United	13/02/1991
Replay	Leeds United	1–2	Arsenal	16/02/1991
16	Cambridge United	2–0	Middlesbrough	26/01/1991

== Fifth round proper ==
The fifth set of games were mainly played over the weekend 16–18 February 1991, with replays being played on 20 February. The Merseyside derby went to an extra replay played on 27 February, the last FA Cup tie to go to multiple replays before a rule change the following season limited ties to one replay. Kenny Dalglish resigned as Liverpool's manager between the two replays. Because Nottingham Forest did not win their fourth round tie until 18 February, their fifth round match was not played until 25 February with a replay on 4 March. Similarly, Arsenal were late beating Leeds United in the previous round and so played Shrewsbury Town on 27 February. Shrewsbury, Crewe Alexandra and Cambridge United, from the Third Division, were the lowest-ranked teams in the draw, with Cambridge defeating Second Division Sheffield Wednesday to progress to the Sixth Round for the second consecutive season.

Tie no	Home team	Score	Away team	Date
1	Liverpool	0–0	Everton	17/02/1991
Replay	Everton	4–4	Liverpool	20/02/1991
Replay	Everton	1–0	Liverpool	27/02/1991
2	Southampton	1–1	Nottingham Forest	25/02/1991
Replay	Nottingham Forest	3–1	Southampton	04/03/1991
3	Notts County	1–0	Manchester City	16/02/1991
4	Shrewsbury Town	0–1	Arsenal	27/02/1991
5	Portsmouth	1–2	Tottenham Hotspur	16/02/1991
6	West Ham United	1–0	Crewe Alexandra	16/02/1991
7	Norwich City	2–1	Manchester United	18/02/1991
8	Cambridge United	4–0	Sheffield Wednesday	16/02/1991

== Sixth round proper ==
9 March 1991

Arsenal	2 – 1	Cambridge United
Campbell 19'; Adams 61'		Dublin 52'

Highbury, London
Referee: Ron Groves (Weston-Super-Mare)

9 March 1991

Norwich City	0 – 1	Nottingham Forest
		Keane 61'

Carrow Road, Norwich
Referee: Allan Gunn (Burgess Hill)

10 March 1991

Tottenham Hotspur	2 – 1	Notts County
Craig Short 52' (o.g.); Gascoigne 83'		O'Riordan 41'

White Hart Lane, London
Referee: Peter Foakes (Clacton-on-Sea)

11 March 1991

West Ham United	2 – 1	Everton
Foster 33'; Slater 60'		Watson 86'

Upton Park, London
Attendance: 28,162
Referee: Mike Reed (Birmingham)

== Semi-finals ==
Tottenham's 3–1 triumph over Arsenal, marked by a Paul Gascoigne goal from 35 yards, ended their opposition's chances of the double.

Nottingham Forest beat Second Division West Ham United 4–0 to reach their first FA Cup final for 32 years and give Brian Clough the chance of winning his first FA Cup to add to the two European Cups, one league title and four League Cups that he had already won with them.

14 April 1991

Tottenham Hotspur	3 – 1	Arsenal
Gascoigne 5'; Lineker 10', 78'	Report	Smith 45'

Wembley, London
Attendance: 77,893
Referee: Ray Lewis (Great Bookham)

14 April 1991

Nottingham Forest	4 – 0	West Ham United
Crosby 50'; Keane 60'; Pearce 72'; Charles 83'	Report	(red card) 26' Gale

Villa Park, Birmingham
Referee: Keith Hackett (South Yorkshire)

== Final ==
An own goal by Des Walker in extra time gave Tottenham Hotspur their eighth FA Cup triumph, a record at the time. Paul Gascoigne went off with a knee injury in the opening 15 minutes, and Gary Lineker had a first-half penalty saved by Nottingham Forest goalkeeper Mark Crossley.

18 May 1991
15:00 BST

Tottenham Hotspur	2–1 (a.e.t.)	Nottingham Forest
Stewart 55'; Walker 94' (o.g.)		Pearce 16'

Wembley, London
Attendance: 80,000
Referee: Roger Milford (Bristol)

== Media coverage ==
For the third consecutive season in the United Kingdom, the BBC were the free to air broadcasters while Sky Sports (formerly The Sports Channel on BSB), were the subscription broadcasters.

The live matches on the BBC were: Crystal Palace vs Nottingham Forest (R3); Arsenal vs Leeds United (R4); Liverpool vs Everton (R5); Tottenham Hotspur vs Notts County (QF); both Tottenham Hotspur vs Arsenal and Nottingham Forest vs West Ham United (SF); and Tottenham Hotspur vs Nottingham Forest (Final).
