= Terry Holbrook =

English football referee

- Full name: Terence Holbrook
- Born: 6 December 1945 (age 80); Walsall, Staffordshire, England

Domestic
Years	League	Role
1980–1982	Football League	Linesman
1982–1993	Football League	Referee
1993–1995	Premier League	Referee

Terence Holbrook (born 6 December 1945) is an English football referee formerly in the Football League and Premier League. During his refereeing career he was based in Walsall, and subsequently Wolverhampton, both in the West Midlands.

== Career ==
He became a Football League linesman in 1980 and two years later graduated to the referees' List. He was senior linesman to Peter Willis in the 1985 FA Cup Final between Manchester United and Everton.

By the late 1980s, Holbrook was taking charge of a number of key matches. In 1989, he handled a League Cup semi-final first leg between Nottingham Forest and Bristol City. One year later, he refereed a semi-final second leg in the same competition at Upton Park as West Ham played Oldham.

In August 1991, he was in charge at Wembley for the Charity Shield – a goalless draw between North London rivals Arsenal and Tottenham. He continued to referee frequently in the old Division One during the following season, as well as controlling his most senior FA Cup tie in the middle – a quarter-final replay between Chelsea and Sunderland.

It was therefore perhaps surprising that he did not feature at all in the Premier League in its first season (1992–93), remaining in the Football League, although he did control a League Cup quarter-final between Ipswich and Sheffield Wednesday in January 1993. However, he eventually made his Premiership debut with a match between Blackburn and Sheffield United in October 1993, and thereafter had regular games at that level. He reached the retirement age of forty-eight at the end of the 1993–94 season but was granted an extension, and all his League games for 1994–95 were in the Premiership. He retired in May 1995, his final match a scoreless draw between Everton and Southampton.

Since his retirement, he has been involved with Footballcv, an organisation which attempts to ensure that all youngsters who write in asking for a trial to assess their talent, get one in front of selected ex-professionals. He still referees games in the Shropshire Premier League and also the West midlands (regional)league.
