= Crystal Palace F.C. Player of the Year =

English professional football club award

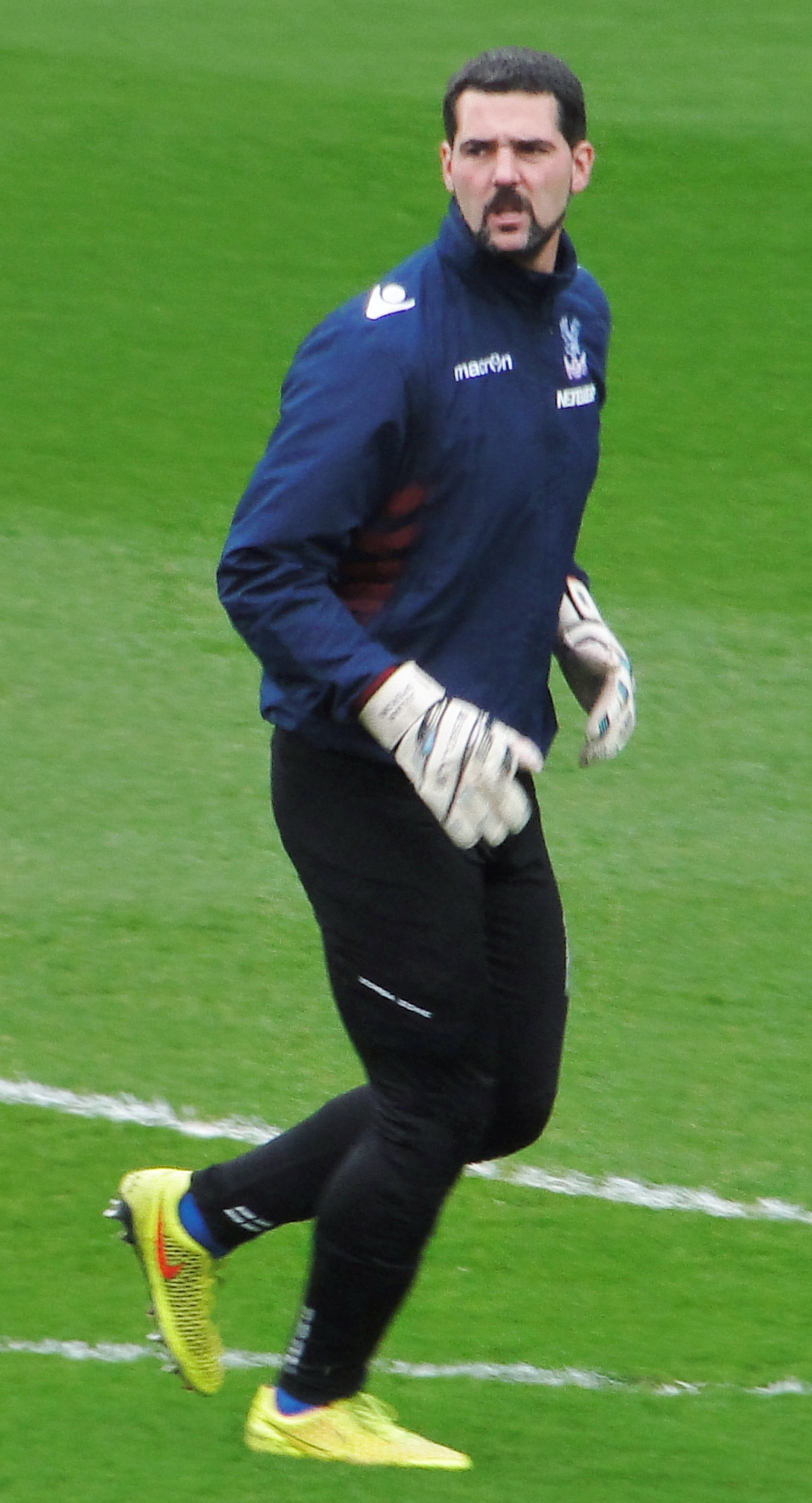
Julián Speroni won the award a record four times, in 2008, 2009, 2010 and 2014.

The Crystal Palace Football Club Player of the Year is awarded at the end of each season. Since the inaugural award was made to John McCormick in 1972, 38 players have won the award. Nine of these players have won the award for a second time, the most recent being Wilfried Zaha. Three players have received the award on more than two occasions: Zaha and Jim Cannon have won it three times and Julián Speroni four times. Paul Hinshelwood was the first to win the trophy in consecutive seasons, a feat since emulated by Andrew Johnson, Julián Speroni and Wilfried Zaha, with the latter two going on to win in a third consecutive season. The current incumbent of the award is Ismaïla Sarr, who was the 2025–26 recipient.

== Winners ==
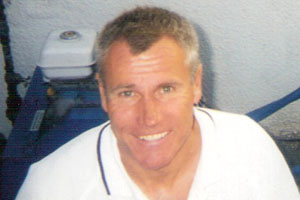
Peter Taylor was the first player to win the award twice and was the first English recipient.

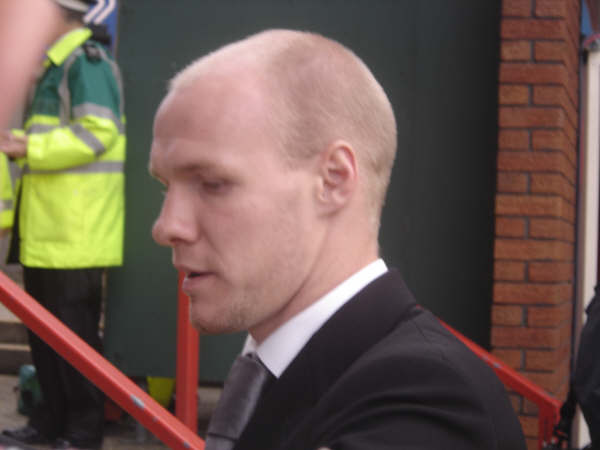
Andrew Johnson won the award in the 2003–04 and 2004–05 seasons, making him the only consecutive recipient in two levels of English football.

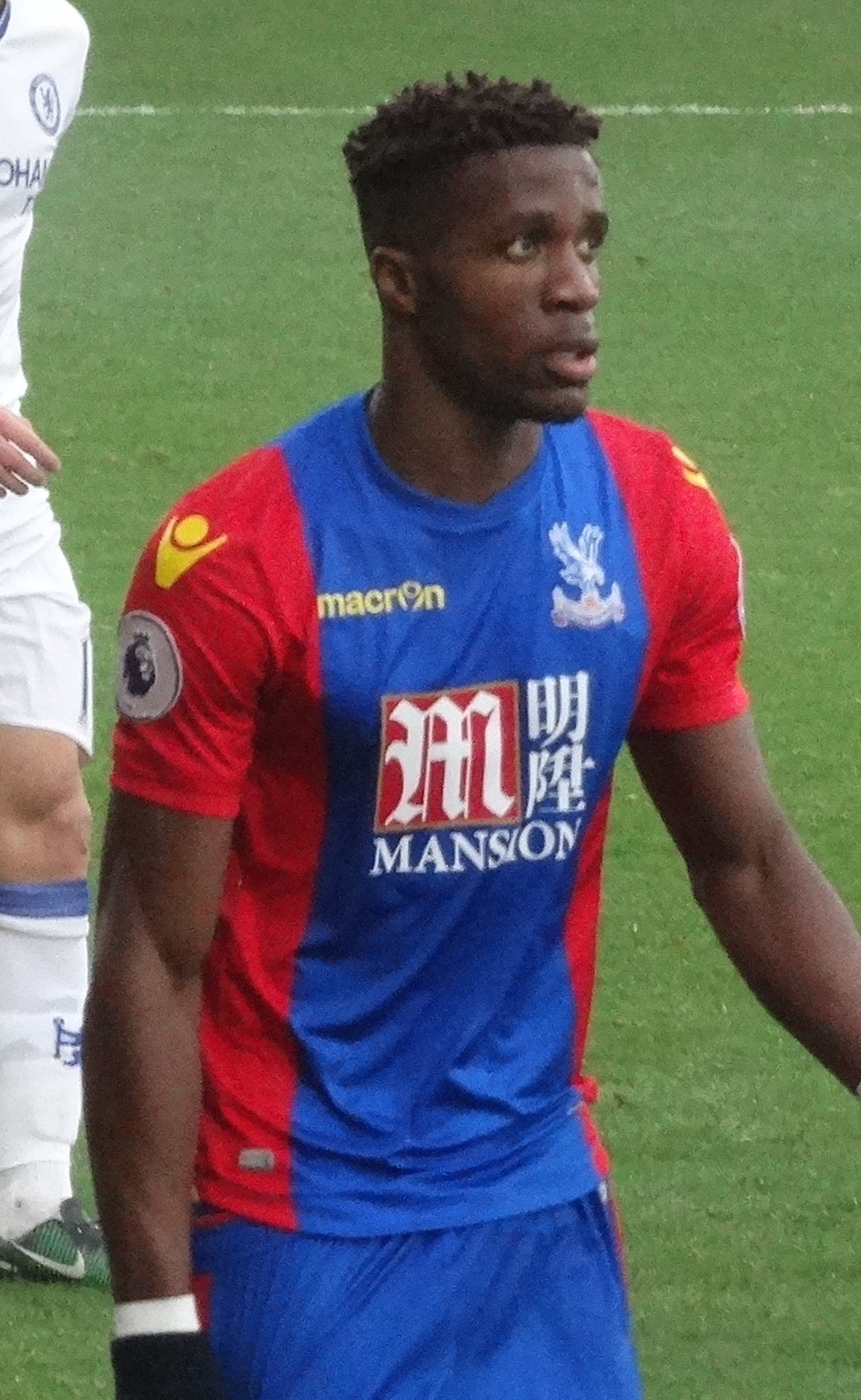
Wilfried Zaha won the award three times.

- Player (X) denotes the number of times a player has won the award.
- **Bold** indicates a player that is currently with the club.

Season	Level (Note: The official level of competition in the structure of the English football league system.)	Player	Position (Note: For a detailed description of playing positions, see Association football positions.)	Nationality	Apps (Note: Appearances and goals from the season the player won the award. Includes appearances and goals in the Premier League, Football League (including play-offs), FA Cup, EFL Cup, FA Community Shield, EFL Trophy and UEFA competitions.)	Goals	Notes
1971–72	1	John McCormick	Defender	Scotland	40	1	(Note: The first winner of the award in 1972.)
1972–73	1	Tony Taylor	Defender	Scotland	45	1	
1973–74	2	Peter Taylor	Midfielder	England	33	6	
1974–75	3	Derek Jeffries	Defender	England	46	0	
1975–76	3	Peter Taylor (2)	Midfielder	England	52	16	(Note: Won the award on two occasions.)
1976–77	3	Kenny Sansom	Defender	England	55	0	
1977–78	2	Jim Cannon	Defender	Scotland	44	3	(Note: Won the award on three occasions.)
1978–79	2	Kenny Sansom (2)	Defender	England	50	1	
1979–80	1	Paul Hinshelwood	Defender	England	48	3	
1980–81	1	Paul Hinshelwood (2)	Defender	England	41	1	
1981–82	2	Paul Barron	Goalkeeper	England	49	0	
1982–83	2	Jerry Murphy	Midfielder	Republic of Ireland	36	2	
1983–84	2	Billy Gilbert	Defender	England	39	2	
1984–85	2	Jim Cannon (2)	Defender	Scotland	44	2	
1985–86	2	George Wood	Goalkeeper	Scotland	45	0	
1986–87	2	Jim Cannon (3)	Defender	Scotland	49	1	
1987–88	2	Geoff Thomas	Midfielder	England	45	6	
1988–89	2	Ian Wright	Forward	England	54	33	
1989–90	1	Mark Bright	Forward	England	50	18	
1990–91	1	Geoff Thomas (2)	Midfielder	England	56	8	
1991–92	1	Eddie McGoldrick	Midfielder	Republic of Ireland	51	10	
1992–93	1	Andy Thorn	Defender	England	39	2	
1993–94	2	Chris Coleman	Defender	Wales	51	3	
1994–95	1	Richard Shaw	Defender	England	56	0	
1995–96	2	Andy Roberts	Midfielder	England	47	1	
1996–97	2	David Hopkin	Midfielder	Scotland	49	17	
1997–98	1	Marc Edworthy	Defender	England	39	0	
1998–99	2	Hayden Mullins	Midfielder	England	47	5	
1999–2000	2	Andy Linighan	Defender	England	48	3	
2000–01	2	Fan Zhiyi	Defender	China	36	1	
2001–02	2	Dougie Freedman	Forward	Scotland	42	21	
2002–03	2	Hayden Mullins (2)	Midfielder	England	52	3	
2003–04	2	Andrew Johnson	Forward	England	49	32	
2004–05	1	Andrew Johnson (2)	Forward	England	38	22	
2005–06	2	Emmerson Boyce	Defender	Barbados	49	1	
2006–07	2	Leon Cort	Defender	Guyana	38	7	
2007–08	2	Julián Speroni	Goalkeeper	Argentina	48	0	(Note: Won the award on four occasions.)
2008–09	2	Julián Speroni (2)	Goalkeeper	Argentina	48	0	
2009–10	2	Julián Speroni (3)	Goalkeeper	Argentina	52	0	
2010–11	2	**Nathaniel Clyne**	Defender	England	49	0	
2011–12	2	Jonathan Parr	Defender	Norway	45	2	
2012–13	2	Mile Jedinak	Midfielder	Australia	46	3	
2013–14	1	Julián Speroni (4)	Goalkeeper	Argentina	39	0	
2014–15	1	Scott Dann	Defender	England	37	4	
2015–16	1	Wilfried Zaha	Midfielder	Ivory Coast	43	5	
2016–17	1	Wilfried Zaha (2)	Midfielder	Ivory Coast	37	7	
2017–18	1	Wilfried Zaha (3)	Midfielder	Ivory Coast	29	9	
2018–19	1	Aaron Wan-Bissaka	Defender	England	39	0	
2019–20	1	Jordan Ayew	Forward	Ghana	39	9	
2020–21	1	Vicente Guaita	Goalkeeper	Spain	37	0	
2021–22	1	Conor Gallagher	Midfielder	England	39	8	
2022–23	1	**Cheick Doucouré**	Midfielder	Mali	35	0	
2023–24	1	**Jean-Philippe Mateta**	Forward	France	39	19	
2024–25	1	**Daniel Muñoz**	Defender	Colombia	46	6	
2025–26	1	**Ismaïla Sarr**	Forward	Senegal	45	21	

== Statistics ==
=== Wins by playing position ===
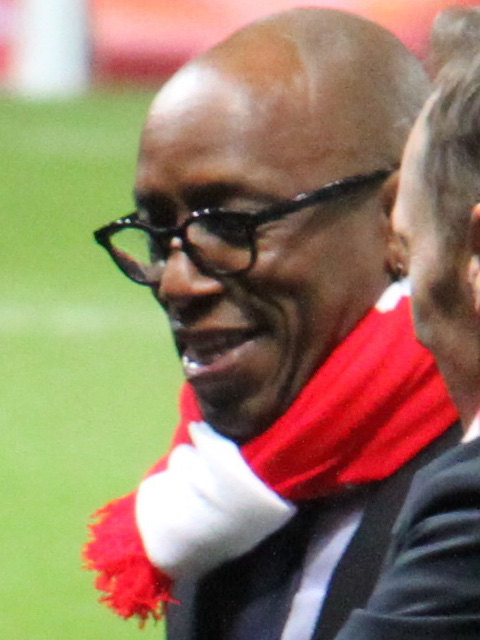
Ian Wright was the first forward to win the award, seventeen years after its inception.

Position	Players	Total
Goalkeeper	4	7
Defender	20	24
Midfielder	10	15
Forward	7	8

=== Wins by nationality ===
Nationality	Players	Total
England	20	26
Scotland	6	8
Republic of Ireland	2	2
Argentina	1	4
Ivory Coast	1	3
Australia	1	1
Barbados	1	1
China	1	1
Colombia	1	1
France	1	1
Ghana	1	1
Guyana	1	1
Mali	1	1
Norway	1	1
Senegal	1	1
Spain	1	1
Wales	1	1
