= Julián Speroni =

Argentine footballer

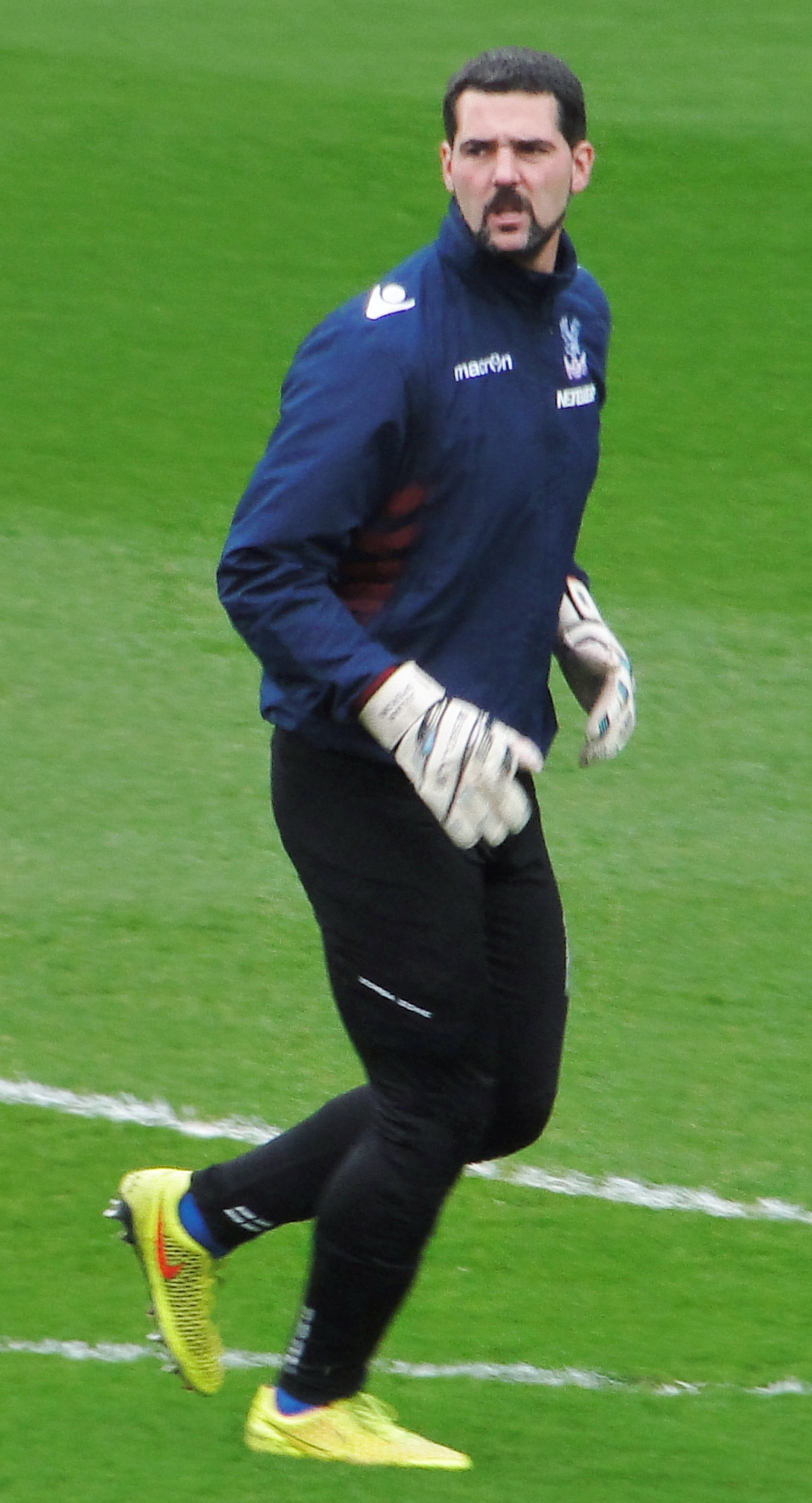
- Speroni warming up for Crystal Palace in 2015

Personal information
- Full name: Julián Maria Speroni
- Date of birth: 18 May 1979 (age 47)
- Place of birth: Buenos Aires, Argentina
- Height: 1.86 m (6 ft 1 in)
- Position: Goalkeeper

Youth career
- 1997–1999: Platense

Senior career*
Years	Team	Apps	(Gls)
1999–2001	Platense	2	(0)
2001–2004	Dundee	92	(0)
2004–2019	Crystal Palace	371	(0)
Total		465	(0)

International career
1998	Argentina U20	1	(0)
- * Club domestic league appearances and goals

Julián Maria Speroni (Spanish pronunciation: [xuˈljan espeˈɾoni]; born 18 May 1979) is an Argentine former professional footballer who played as a goalkeeper.

Having started his career at Platense, he played three seasons in the Scottish Premier League with Dundee before joining Crystal Palace for £750,000 in 2004. His first three seasons at Selhurst Park saw him largely play understudy to Gábor Király who made the goalkeeping spot his own. This was until the Hungarian departed Selhurst Park at the end of the 2006–07 season. Back in the line-up Speroni flourished and won his reputation back. He went on to play 405 matches across all competitions for the club. On 9 May 2019, it was announced that Speroni would leave Crystal Palace at the end of the 2018–19 season.

== Club career ==
=== Dundee ===
Speroni was born in Buenos Aires. He started his career with Club Atlético Platense, in his homeland, but moved after just one year as a professional and two matches, to Scottish side Dundee. Dundee manager Ivano Bonetti received advice from an Italian contact to Speroni's potential. The move to Dundee was delayed for two months, due to administration delays in Argentina, holding up Speroni's application for an Italian passport.

Normally what happens with footballers is you tend to play first in your country and then after a while, say a year or two, and then you have a chance to move on to Europe, which is what most South American players want to do. But in my case it was completely different – I only played two games. He [Bonetti] and the goalkeeper coach Claudio Bozzini decided that they liked what they saw, and offered me a contract. They were pretty special circumstances. I had a big decision to make as well - it was a big experience leaving home. I had to make a decision, should I play more games there before moving on or take a gamble and come to Europe, and I decided to take a gamble. Sometimes I thought I would not be able to play for Dundee because of bureaucratic problems in Argentina. I first came to Dundee in July but I did not sign for them until two and a half months later. I had to return to Argentina because it had been left in the hands of agents to sort out, so I had to go and sort it out myself. I qualified for an Italian passport but there were a lot of people in Argentina applying for the same thing and it got held up. But Ivano was very patient with me. He told me to go to Argentina and sort it out. He has been very important in my career because he gave me first-team football – Julian Speroni reflecting on his time at Dundee.

Speroni made his debut for the club, starting the whole game, in a 1–1 draw against Falkirk in the third round of Scottish Cup on 6 January 2002. In a follow–up, he kept his first Dundee's clean sheet, in a 1–0 win against Hibernian. Since joining the club, he quickly became Dundee's first choice goalkeeper for the rest of the 2001–02 season, having successfully dispatch the role from Jamie Langfield. During a 2–2 draw against Dunfermline Athletic on 13 February 2002, Speroni was punched in the face by Stevie Crawford after Crawford tried to wrestle the ball from Speroni, resulting him being sent–off in the 74th minute. The club's owner Peter Marr said about the player: "He has done very well and we will do what we can to come up with a deal that keeps him here." It came after when Serie A club Inter Milan was interested in signing him earlier this year. Despite Dundee's poor performance for the rest of the 2001–02 season that saw them finish in ninth place, he proved to be one of the positive highlights for the club and went on to make twenty–one appearances in all competitions.

Ahead of the 2002–03 season, Speroni signed a three–year contract with Dundee, keeping him until 2005. He later spoke out about the departure of manager Ivano Bonetti, who signed him, saying: "Ivano had a huge impact on my career and was very patient with me when I first came to Dundee. Before he brought me here, I was playing in youth teams in Argentina. When Ivano left the club I did wait a while to sign a new contract as I wanted to see what was happening. Teams in Italy were interested in me but I decided to stay at Dundee, and now, even though I am still only 24 years old, I am playing the biggest game of my career." Speroni continued to be the club's first choice goalkeeper. He continued to display impressive performances in a number of matches despite Dundee's average results. Speroni later helped reach the Scottish Cup final after helping the club beat Inverness CT 1–0. In the event leading up to the final, Speroni helped Dundee finish sixth place in the league. He started in the final against Rangers, as the club lost 1–0. At the end of the 2002–03 season, Speroni went on to make forty–six appearances in all competitions.

At the start of the 2003–04 season, Speroni continued to be the club's first choice goalkeeper despite facing competition from Langfield and Derek Soutar. He played in his first UEFA Cup match against Vllaznia Shkodër and kept a clean sheet, as Dundee won 2–0. In the return leg, Speroni kept a clean sheet, as the club won 4–0 (6–0 on aggregate) and advance to the next round. However, Dundee went on to lose 3–1 against Perugia in the next round, eliminating the club from the tournament. Halfway through the season, Dundee went into administration in November, leading the club expecting to sell him in the January transfer window, but he stayed in the end. His performance led Herald Scotland commented that Dundee "were fortunate to have him", calling him an "inspirational". Despite the club were on administration, Speroni helped Dundee finish seventh place in the league. At the end of the 2003–04 season, he went on to make forty–six appearances in all competitions. Following this, Speroni was expected to leave the club, with clubs, such as, Rangers, Portsmouth and Crystal Palace interested in signing him. Initially, Dundee turned down £500,000 bid from Crystal Palace, but they accepted a bid after they increased the offer for him.

Eleven years after leaving Dundee, Speroni was rewarded for his years of service to Crystal Palace with a testimonial match against Dundee on 26 May 2015. Two months later, prior to the testimonial match, he was inducted into the Dundee Hall of Fame picking up the International Award which was previously won by fellow countryman Claudio Caniggia. Speroni played in his testimonial match against his former club, as the club won 4–3, where it attracted more than 11,000 supporters. After the match, many past and present players of both Dundee and Crystal Palace paid tribute to him.

=== Crystal Palace ===
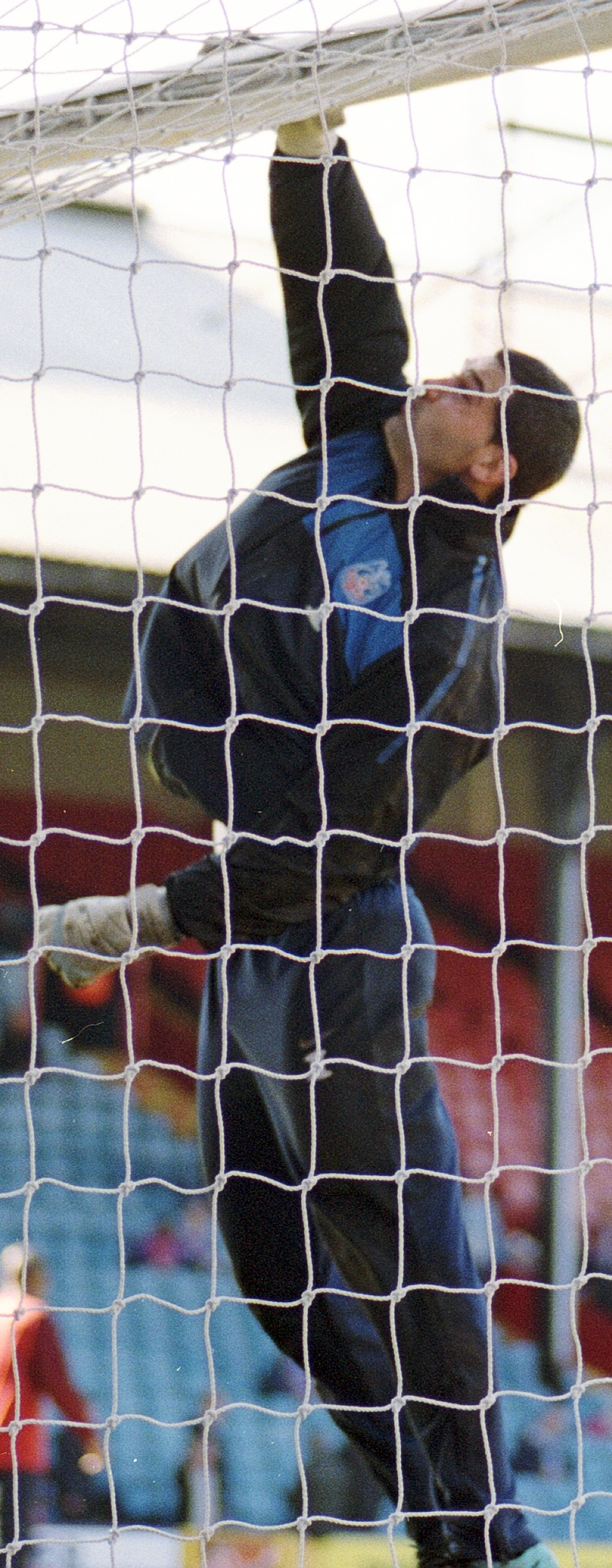
Speroni training with Crystal Palace in 2011.

Speroni signed for Crystal Palace, newly promoted to the Premier League, on 13 July 2004, for a fee of around £750,000. Upon joining the club, he was given a number one shirt. Speroni was featured in Crystal Palace's friendly matches throughout the pre–season tour.

He made his debut for the club, starting the whole game, and made an impressive display throughout the match, in a 1–1 draw against Norwich City in the opening game of the season. In a follow–up match against Everton, Speroni was at fault for giving away a penalty to give the opposition team an equaliser, in a 3–1 loss; after the match, manager Iain Dowie said he needs to "get used to pressure situations and clear his lines". The next four matches saw Crystal Palace lose matches, with Speroni conceding a total of twelve goals. As a result of his poor performance, he was replaced by Hungarian international Gábor Király and was placed on the substitute bench for the rest of the 2004–05 season. Speroni appeared twice for the club, playing in the League Cup matches. Speroni watched from the substitute bench, as the club were relegated from the Premier League. At the end of the 2004–05 season, he went on to make eight appearances in all competitions.

Ahead of the 2005–06 season, Speroni was linked a move back to Scotland, with Dundee United, but he ended up staying at Crystal Palace. Speroni switched number shirt from one to twenty–seven, with Király taking over his original number. He made his first appearance of the 2005–06 season against Walsall in the first round of the League Cup and earned his first clean sheet, in a 3–0 win to advance to the next round. Speroni made three more appearances for the club in the League Cup, including a 2–1 win against Liverpool. Four days after beating Liverpool, he made his first league appearance against Crewe Alexandra, coming on in the 59th minute for the injured Király, in a 2–2 draw. Speroni then started three more matches for Crystal Palace between 3 December 2005 to 17 December 2005. Speroni continued to play understudy to Király for the second time this season, as the club unsuccessfully bounce back to the Premier League. At the end of the 2005–06 season, he went on to make eight appearances in all competitions.

Ahead of the 2006–07 season, Speroni switched number shirts for the third time when he took over the twelve shirt from Mikele Leigertwood, who departed Crystal Palace. As Speroni continued to play understudy to Király, he found himself competing with new signing Scott Flinders over a spot in the substitute bench, as well as facing his own injury concern. It was not until on 16 December 2006 when Speroni made his first appearance of the season, in a 1–0 loss against Derby County. This was followed up by keeping his first clean sheet for the club, in a 1–0 win against Sunderland. After the match, newspaper Your Local Guardian praised his performance, saying: "he instilled confidence in his defence, made some crucial saves and kept a clean sheet". After Király was dropped from the first team, manager Peter Taylor announced that Speroni would be stepping in as his replacement. He made his first appearance for Crystal Palace in four months, as the club lost 2–0 against Barnsley on 21 April 2007. Speroni started the remaining two matches of the 2006–07 season, helping Crystal Palace keep two clean sheets. Manager Taylor revealed that he is planning to use him as the club's first choice goalkeeper next season and have no intention of signing a new goalkeeper. At the end of the 2006–07 season, he went on to make five appearances in all competitions.

In the opening game of the 2007–08 season, Speroni contributed the match well against Southampton when he set up a goal for James Scowcroft, who went on to score a hat–trick, in a 4–1 win. Back in the line-up as Crystal Palace's first choice goalkeeper, Speroni flourished and won his reputation back. During a 1–0 loss against Ipswich Town on 26 August 2007, he was given a yellow card in the 43rd minute after "handling on the edge of his box"; after the match, the opposition team felt that Speroni should have been sent–off, which manager Taylor disagreed. In a follow–up match against rivals, Charlton Athletic, Speroni was at fault when he "rushed out to deal with a hopeful long-ball in the 74th minute - only for substitute Svetoslav Todorov to nip in and score the only goal of the game", in a 1–0 loss. After the match, Taylor said he maintain his backing for Speroni, saying he will bounce back. In a match against Sheffield United on 22 September 2007, Speroni was at fault once again when he conceded two goals, in a 3–2 win; leading to suggestions that Taylor could re–sign Iain Turner, which he denied, though the possibly was not ruled out. Following this, Speroni managed to bounce back with impressive displays and helped the club go on a fifteen matches unbeaten run between 3 November 2007 and 28 January 2008. Manager Neil Warnock also praised his performance, describing him as looking sharp and bright, which teammate Mark Hudson agreed. Towards the end of the 2007–08 season, he helped Crystal Palace qualify for the Championship play–offs. Speroni played in both legs of the Championship play–offs against Bristol City, as the club lost 4–2 on aggregate. At the end of the 2007–08 season, he was an ever present goalkeeper, playing all forty–eight league matches. With his contract expiring at the end of the 2007–08 season, Crystal Palace began talks with Speroni over a new contract. He signed a contract extension with the club on a three-year contract, keeping him until 2011. For his performance, Speroni won the club's "Player of the Year" award. Reflecting on his performance in the 2007–08 season, Your Local Guardian said: "Julian Speroni had a tremendous campaign, increasing his authority and presence alongside his already technically excellent game. Time after time, Speroni has kept us in matches with some fine saves and it was a relief when he sorted out his contract."

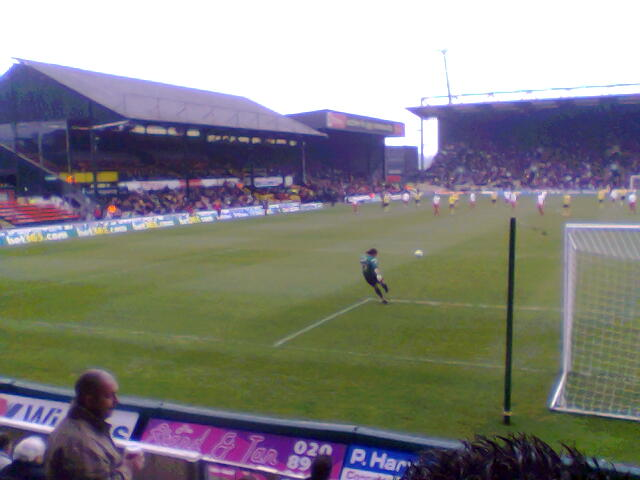
Speroni taking a goal kick during a match against Watford on 19 April 2008.

Ahead of the 2008–09 season, Speroni reverted to wearing his number one shirt, which he kept throughout his Crystal Palace's career. Speroni continued to be the club's first choice goalkeeper despite facing competition from Darryl Flahavan. At the start of the 2008–09 season, he continued to stand out as Crystal Palace's key players despite the club's poor start. He helped Crystal Palace keep three consecutive clean sheets between 30 September 2008 and 18 October 2008. Speroni started in every match until he missed one match, due to a leg injury sustained during a 2–0 win against Coventry City on 8 November 2008. Despite missing one match and facing risk over his return from a leg injury, Speroni returned to the starting line–up from injury against Bristol City on 22 November 2008 and helped the club win 4–2. Since his return from injury, he helped Crystal Palace go on an eight match unbeaten run between 22 November 2008 and 26 December 2008. Speroni continued to regain his first team place as the club's first choice goalkeeper for the rest of the 2008–09 season. During a 1–0 loss against Southampton on 13 April 2009, he suffered a gash on his face in the 80th minute of the match that required him stitches and had Clint Hill stand by in goal for the rest of the match, with all three substitutes were used. But Speroni quickly recovered from injury, returning to the starting line–up against Derby County on 18 April 2009 and helped Crystal Palace keep a clean sheet, in a 1–0 win. At the end of the 2008–09 season, he went on to make forty–eight appearances in all competitions. For the second time in a row, Speroni was named the club's "Player of the Year" award.

Ahead of the 2009–10 season, Speroni was linked a move away from Crystal Palace, but manager Warnock said he would not sell him. He started in the first four matches of the season. However, Speroni missed one match, due to a throat injury. He made his return to the starting line–up against Manchester City in the second round of the League Cup, losing 2–0. Despite the loss, Speroni's performance was praised by Your Local Guardian, saying: "His kicking was a bit off but the defence looked a lot more secure with him behind them" and named him Man of the Match. He then helped the club keep three consecutive clean sheets between 19 September 2009 and 29 September 2009. Following this, he continued to establish himself as the club's first choice goalkeeper and, once again, his performance drew praise. This includes an impressive performance against Queens Parks Rangers, which manager Warnock praised Speroni's performance, saying: "He's the best keeper in this division by a mile, and I don't see anyone better in the Premier League. It's good that nobody rates him. But he's not leaving this club while I'm manager - unless I take him somewhere with me." Speroni's performance, once again, was praised against Middlesbrough in the follow–up match when he "world class and claimed everything in his box in a commanding display" and kept a clean sheet. Halfway through the 2009–10 season, Crystal Palace entered administration during the January 2010 transfer window, and the consequent ten-point deduction left the team in danger of relegation, just Speroni experienced this situation once again like his time at Dundee. He continued to maintain his impressive display in a number of matches towards the end of the 2009–10 season despite the club's poor results that saw them in relegation zone. His performance was praised by manager Paul Hart, who replaced Warnock halfway through the season, in a match against Blackpool on 20 March 2010. In a match against Sheffield Wednesday in the last game of the season, which Crystal Palace needed a point to survive at their hosts' expense, Speroni started the whole game and despite conceding two goals, he helped the club draw 2–2, resulting in the opposition team relegated and the team staying up. At the end of the 2009–10 season, Speroni went on to make thirty–two appearances in all competitions. For his performance, he was given a new record, becoming the first man to win Crystal Palace's "Player of the Year" award for three consecutive years, equalling Jim Cannon's record, as well as, vice-president's player of the year. Upon receiving his award, Speroni said he would like to stay at the club for the rest of his career.

Ahead of the 2010–11 season, Speroni was linked a move away from Crystal Palace, with Premier League clubs were monitoring his situation throughout the summer transfer window, but he ended up staying at the club. At the start of the 2010–11 season, he continued to be Crystal Palace's first choice goalkeeper. Speroni continued to maintain his impressive display in a number of matches despite the club's poor results. This includes a performance against Burnley, which he kept a clean sheet in a 0–0 draw on 18 September 2010. After the match, manager George Burley praised his performance, calling him "a top class keeper" and "an important player" for Crystal Palace. Speroni, himself, said he was happy to earn himself his first clean sheet of the season. Speroni found himself booked on two occasions throughout the 2010–11 season that saw the opposition team scoring at the last minutes of the game; the first one came against Queens Park Rangers on 2 October 2010 and the second one came against Bristol City on 28 December 2010. After months of speculation, he finally agreed a 3 1/2-year extension to his current contract. Speroni made his 200th appearance for the club against Norwich City on 29 January 2011, as he helped Crystal Palace keep a clean sheet, in a 0–0 draw. Since the start of the 2010–11 season, Speroni started in every match for the club until he suffered a groin injury during a 3–3 draw against Reading on 26 February 2011 that caused him to miss one match by being placed on the substitute bench. Speroni made his return to the starting line–up against Cardiff City on 8 March 2011, as he helped Crystal Palace keep a clean sheet, in a 1–0 win, once again keeping a second clean sheet against them. As the club soon found themselves placed in the relegation zone once again, Speroni later helped Crystal Palace avoid relegation after drawing 1–1 against Hull City on 30 April 2011. At the end of the 2010–11 season, he went on to make forty–eight appearances in all competitions.

At the start of the 2011–12 season, Speroni continued to established himself as the club's first choice goalkeeper. He then helped Crystal Palace keep five consecutive clean sheets between 15 October 2011 and 1 November 2011. This resulted in the club setting a new record for themselves by going 619 minutes without conceding. Since the start of the 2011–12 season, Speroni started in every match until he missed three matches, due to illness. Speroni made his return to the starting line–up against Cardiff City in the first leg of the League Cup on 10 January 2012 and kept a clean sheet, in a 1–0 win. However, in the return leg, he was unable to help Crystal Palace reach the final after the club lost 3–1 after Cardiff City was able to overcome deficit and played throughout extra time. After making his return from injury, Speroni then helped Crystal Palace keep three consecutive clean sheets between 18 February 2012 and 3 March 2012. This was followed up by making his 250th appearance for the club, in a 1–1 draw against Coventry City. He helped Crystal Palace go unbeaten in the next three matches, bringing the club's unbeaten run to ten. However, during a 2–2 draw against Reading on 21 April 2012, Speroni suffered an injury in the 25th minute and was substituted, in what turned out to be his last appearance of the season. At the end of the 2011–12 season, he went on to make forty–four appearances in all competitions.

At the start of the 2012–13 season, Speroni continued to regain his first team place, as Crystal Palace's first choice goalkeeper role. Once again, he helped the club go on a fourteen matches unbeaten run between 1 September 2012 and 17 November 2012, resulting in them being placed at the top of the table at one point. In a match against Huddersfield Town on 22 December 2012, Speroni performed well throughout the match and saved a penalty from Adam Clayton but he conceded the equaliser goal, in a 1–1 draw. After the match, manager Ian Holloway defended Speroni's performance and said if it were not for him, Crystal Palace would have lost the match. He then made his 300th appearance for the club, in a 4–1 loss against Birmingham City on 29 March 2013. Speroni helped Crystal Palace qualify for the Championship play–offs after beating Peterborough United in the last game of the season. He played in both legs of the play–offs semi–final against Brighton & Hove Albion and kept a clean sheet, as the club won 2–0 on aggregate. In the Football League Championship play-off final, Speroni started in goal throughout the match and played 120 minutes, as Crystal Palace beat Watford 1–0 to seal their promotion return to the English top tier after an eight-year absence. At the end of the 2012–13 season, he went on to make forty–nine appearances in all competitions.

In opening game of the 2013–14 season, Speroni made his first Premier League appearance in nine years, in a 1–0 loss against Tottenham Hotspur. Despite the club's poor start with just three points from the first eight games, he continued to regain his first team place, as Crystal Palace's first choice goalkeeper role. Under the new management of Tony Pulis, the club's results soon improved in the league as the 2013–14 season progressed. His performance was praised by manager Pulis, saying: "Speroni made some good saves and in particular one outstanding one but that is what you are hoping you are paying him to do, overall it was a great team performance with everyone working hard." He then helped Crystal Palace keep three consecutive clean sheets between 29 March 2014 and 12 April 2014. A week later on 19 April 2014, Speroni kept another clean sheet against West Ham United, in a 1–0 win to ensure the club's relegation safety. At the end of the 2013–14 season, he went on to make thirty–nine appearances in all competitions. Following this, Speroni was named Crystal Palace's Player of the Year for the fourth time. His contract expired early into 2014 and he subsequently negotiated contract offers with the club, Sunderland and West Bromwich Albion. On 13 June 2014, Crystal Palace announced that Speroni had signed a new contract with the club for 12 months with a further 12 month option.

Despite being told by manager Pulis that he would not be Crystal Palace's first choice goalkeeper, Speroni, nevertheless, continued to remain the first choice following the departure of Pulis at the start of the 2014–15 season. In a match against Burnley on 13 September 2014, he saved a penalty from Scott Arfield, as the club drew 0–0. After the match, his performance was praised by the returning manager Neil Warnock, saying: "I think they broke the mould with him. Speroni is just a one-off but he does that every week and that's why he's been here so long with us. Speroni is a gem of a person." During a 2–2 draw against West Bromwich Albion on 25 October 2014. Speroni was substituted in the 55th minute after he took a blow to the face from Craig Dawson's arm. After the match, manager Warnock questioned the official's failure to take action against Dawson, calling it "an assault almost" and that Speroni could have been injured. But he made his recovery and returned to the starting line–up against Sunderland, as Crystal Palace lost 3–1 on 3 November 2014. Speroni then made his 347th league appearance for Crystal Palace, breaking John Jackson's record as the team's goalkeeper with the most league appearances, against Arsenal on 21 February 2015, losing 2–1. During a 2–1 win against Stoke City on 21 March 2015, he made an impressive display by making impressive saves and was praised by his teammate, James McArthur. However, Speroni uncharacteristically had an inconsistent season could be due to a lack of rotation and even a sense of being too comfortable in the number one spot. Despite being dropped to the substitute bench for the last two remaining matches of the 2014–15 season, he went on to make thirty–seven appearances in all competitions. On 22 May 2015, Speroni signed a one-year contract extension at Crystal Palace to keep him at the club until at least the end of the 2015–16 season.

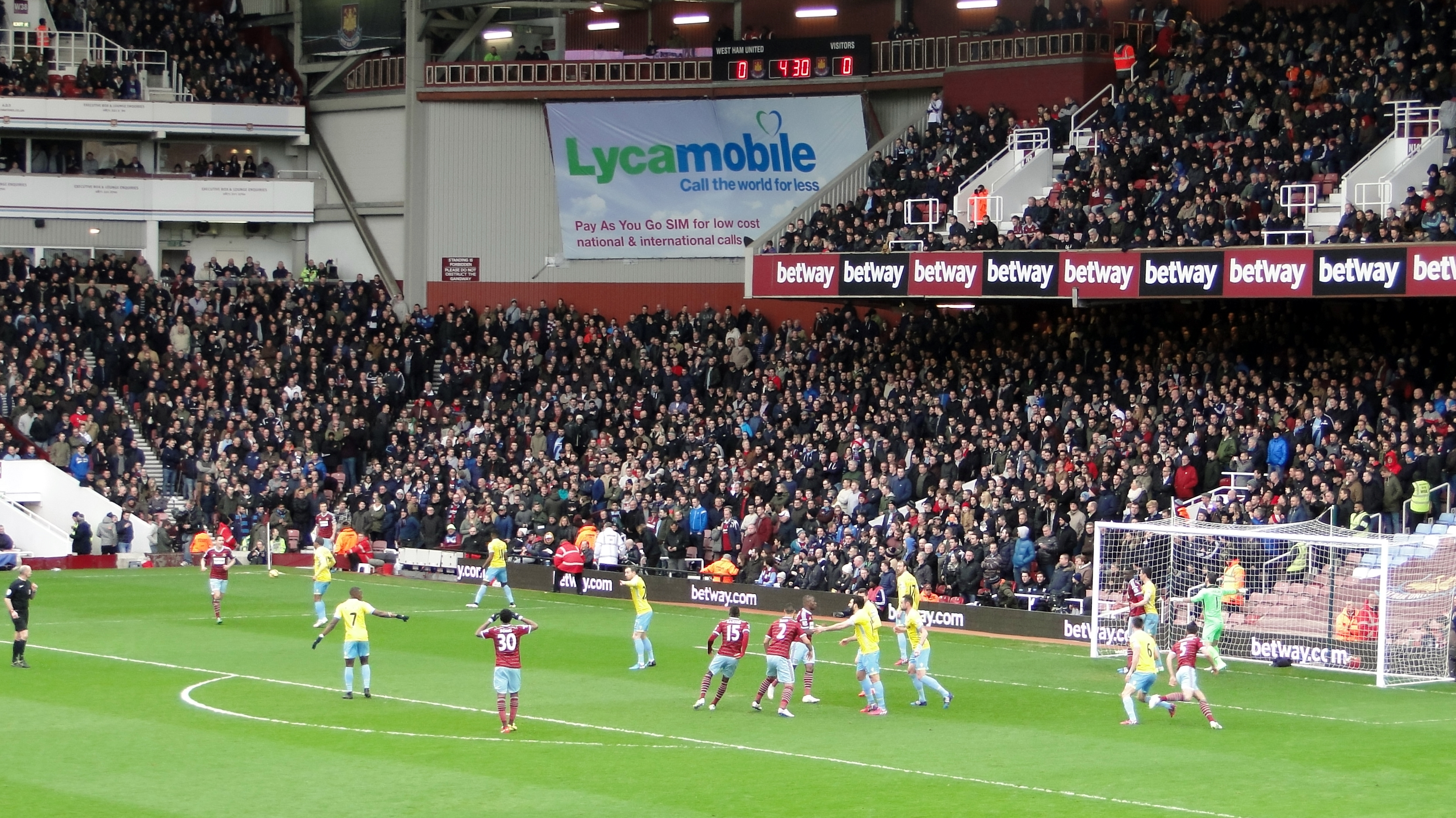
Speroni (number one in a green shirt) prepare to defend, as West Ham United prepare to take a corner kick on 28 February 2015.

At the start of the 2015–16 season, Speroni lost his first choice goalkeeper role and was dropped to third-choice goalkeeper in that season, behind Wayne Hennessey (whom he competed since 2014) and Alex McCarthy, as well as, his own injury concern. Speroni also faced a finger injury that saw him miss the club's pre–season tour and upon returning from injury, he continued to spend most of the season on the substitute bench. Speroni made his first appearance of the season against Manchester United on 20 April 2016, losing 2–0. He then made his second appearance in the league match against Southampton in the final day of the season, losing 4–1 and his appearance in the match equalled John Jackson's club appearance record as a goalkeeper in all competitions. Speroni appeared as an unused substitute in the FA Cup final against Manchester United, as Crystal Palace lost 2–1. At the end of the 2015–16 season, he went on to make two appearances in all competitions. Following this, Speroni signed another one-year contract extension on 13 June 2016 to remain with the club until the end of 2016–17 season.

The 2016–17 season continued to see Speroni remain placed as Crystal Palace's third-choice goalkeeper behind Hennessey and Steve Mandanda. He made his first appearance of the 2016–17 season, starting the whole game, in a 0–0 draw against Bolton Wanderers in the third round of FA Cup. After the match, Speroni said he was honoured to break another club's record with 389th appearance, as well as, keeping a clean sheet for the 108 time. Speroni was featured in the FA Cup replay against Bolton Wanderers and helped Crystal Palace win 2–1 to advance to the next round. At one point, Speroni was linked with a move to Cardiff City, but he ended up staying at Crystal Palace throughout the January transfer window. Despite suffering an injury later in the 2016–17 season, Speroni went on to make two appearances in all competitions. Manager Sam Allardyce revealed that he signed a contract extension with Crystal Palace.

In the 2017–18 season, Speroni continued to remain as Crystal Palace's second choice goalkeeper behind Hennessey. He made his first appearance of the season against Ipswich Town in the second round of the League Cup and helped the club win 2–1 to advance to the next round. Speroni captained Crystal Palace for the first time in his career against Huddersfield Town in the third round of the League Cup and helped the club keep a clean sheet, in a 1–0 win to advance to the next round. Following the injury of Hennessey, Speroni was named a starter in Crystal Palace's match day squad again, helping the club win 2–1 over the defending champions Chelsea on 14 October 2017. After the match, Speroni said he was happy to make his return to the pitch. Following this, Speroni received a handful of first team football despite competing with Hennessey, who returned from injury. He made his 400th appearance for Crystal Palace, in a 2–1 win against Watford on 12 December 2017. Following this, Speroni said: "I am only 38 and for a goalkeeper that is not too bad and I must say that at this time I feel better than ever so I want to play as much as I can. I want to be enjoying it as long as I can compete at this level but you can never put a time limit on it because you never know what is around the corner but if I keep feeling like I am at the moment then I will be looking to play for a few more years yet." By late–December, he was dropped from the substitute bench, with Hennessey preferred as the club's first choice goalkeeper for the rest of the 2017–18 season. Speroni also faced his own injury concern after he suffering a knee injury that saw him out for two months. At the end of the 2017–18 season, he went on to make thirteen appearances in all competitions.

After months of speculation over his future at Crystal Palace, Speroni signed a one–year contract extension with the club on 4 July 2018. At the start of the 2018–19 season, he continued to remain the pecking order behind Hennessey and Vicente Guaita and was Crystal Palace's third choice goalkeeper. Following the injuries of Hennessey and Guaita, Speroni made his first appearance of the season against Liverpool on 19 January 2019 and was at fault when he conceded the fifth goal of the game, in a 4–3 loss. After the match, both manager Roy Hodgson and chairman Steve Parish defended Speroni's performance, while the player acknowledged his mistake on the third goal. Despite this, he continued to keep his place in goal against Tottenham Hotspur in the fourth round of the FA Cup and kept a clean sheet, in a 2–0 win, which eventually turned out to be his last appearance in his career. After the match, his performance was praised and was even Man of the match on the club's website. Upon the return of Guaita and Hennessey, Speroni returned to Crystal Palace's third choice goalkeeper status, as well as, his own concern. On 30 April 2019, he was awarded the club's Chairman's Award for Outstanding Contribution at the award ceremony. It was announced on 9 May 2019 that Speroni would leave Crystal Palace at the end of the 2018–19 season, after 15 years with the club. By the time he departed Crystal Palace, Speroni remains the last player born in the 1970s to play in the Premier League. In the wake of his departure, past and present players and supporters from Crystal Palace paid tribute to the player, acknowledging his contributions he has done for the club. Manager Hodgson said he offered Speroni a starting place in the last game of the season against Bournemouth as a wonderful gesture but he rejected a chance at his own request. On the day of the match, Speroni received a guard of honour from his team-mates and made a farewell speech, thanking the club and will never forget his time there. At the end of the 2018–19 season, he made two appearances in all competitions.

During his time at Crystal Palace, Speroni quickly became a fan favourite among the club's supporters and soon earn himself a cult hero. Your Local Guardian once described Speroni as "one of the nicest guy in football", a sentiment that was agreed upon by Crystal Palace's supporters Because of his contributions made at Crystal Palace, he considered himself to be a fan of the club.

== Post-playing career ==
After leaving Crystal Palace, Speroni said that he ruled out hanging up his boots and was willing to play in his forties. However, after not finding another club he announced his retirement from professional football after playing for 20 years. Speroni previously hinted that he would be moving to coaching once in his playing time is over. In October 2022 he returned to Crystal Palace as a coach within the club's academy system.

== International career ==
In November 1998, Speroni was named in the squad for a friendly against Japan U20 in Tokyo. In December 1998, he was called into the Argentina U20 pre-selection squad for the 1999 South American U-20 Championship, Argentina's under 20 team played friendlies against Hungary and Denmark. On 30 December José Pékerman did not name him in the final squad.

Speroni made one appearance for the Argentina U20 team, and said on two separate interviews that he would like to get a call–up from the senior team, but was not considered throughout his professional career. Both managers Warnock and Paul Hart called on Maradona to give him a place for the FIFA World Cup in South Africa.

== Personal life ==
Born in Buenos Aires, Argentina to working-class parents, Speroni said he spoke about positivity on his childhood. Growing up, he began playing football when he was eight years old and joined a school football club. He at one point almost quit playing football but his coach convinced him otherwise, as he enjoyed playing football. Speroni also revealed that he grew up watching Serie A football because of its popularity in the country and was a boyhood Boca Juniors supporter. Speroni also holds an Italian passport, for which he qualified through his grandfather. He is a Christian and also on the board of reference for Christian Solidarity Worldwide (CSW), an organisation working for religious freedom through advocacy and human rights. In addition to speaking Spanish, he speaks English. Speroni is married to his childhood sweetheart, Marina, an artist. Together, they have three children and all of them were born in England.

Speroni owned a restaurant in Purley, south London that was named "Speroni's". He describes the restaurant as "mixture of Italian and Spanish", due to his background. The restaurant closed in October 2016 following "structural issues". Speroni also took part in charity work during his playing career at Crystal Palace.

== Career statistics ==
Appearances and goals by club, season and competition
Club	Season	League			Cup		League Cup		Europe		Other		Total	
Club	Season	Division	Apps	Goals	Apps	Goals	Apps	Goals	Apps	Goals	Apps	Goals	Apps	Goals
Platense	2000–01	Primera B Nacional	2	0	0	0	0	0	—		—		2	0
Dundee	2001–02	Scottish Premier League	17	0	4	0	0	0	—		—		21	0
Dundee	2002–03	Scottish Premier League	38	0	6	0	2	0	—		—		46	0
Dundee	2003–04	Scottish Premier League	37	0	2	0	3	0	4 (Note: UEFA Cup (Europa League))	0	—		46	0
Dundee	Total		92	0	12	0	5	0	4	0	—		113	0
Crystal Palace	2004–05	Premier League	6	0	0	0	2	0	—		—		8	0
Crystal Palace	2005–06	Championship	4	0	0	0	4	0	—		—		8	0
Crystal Palace	2006–07	Championship	5	0	0	0	0	0	—		—		5	0
Crystal Palace	2007–08	Championship	46	0	0	0	0	0	—		2 (Note: Appearance in Championship play-offs)	0	48	0
Crystal Palace	2008–09	Championship	45	0	3	0	0	0	—		—		48	0
Crystal Palace	2009–10	Championship	45	0	5	0	2	0	—		—		52	0
Crystal Palace	2010–11	Championship	45	0	1	0	2	0	—		—		48	0
Crystal Palace	2011–12	Championship	42	0	0	0	2	0	—		—		44	0
Crystal Palace	2012–13	Championship	46	0	0	0	0	0	—		3	0	49	0
Crystal Palace	2013–14	Premier League	37	0	2	0	0	0	—		—		39	0
Crystal Palace	2014–15	Premier League	36	0	1	0	0	0	—		—		37	0
Crystal Palace	2015–16	Premier League	2	0	0	0	0	0	—		—		2	0
Crystal Palace	2016–17	Premier League	0	0	2	0	0	0	—		—		2	0
Crystal Palace	2017–18	Premier League	11	0	0	0	2	0	—		—		13	0
Crystal Palace	2018–19	Premier League	1	0	1	0	0	0	—		—		2	0
Crystal Palace	Total		371	0	15	0	14	0	—		5	0	405	0
Career total			465	0	27	0	19	0	4	0	5	0	520	0

== Honours ==
Crystal Palace

- Football League Championship play-offs: 2013
- FA Cup runner-up: 2015–16

Individual

- Crystal Palace Player of the Year: 2007–08, 2008–09, 2009–10, 2013–14
