= Aaron Wan-Bissaka =

DR Congolese footballer (born 1997)

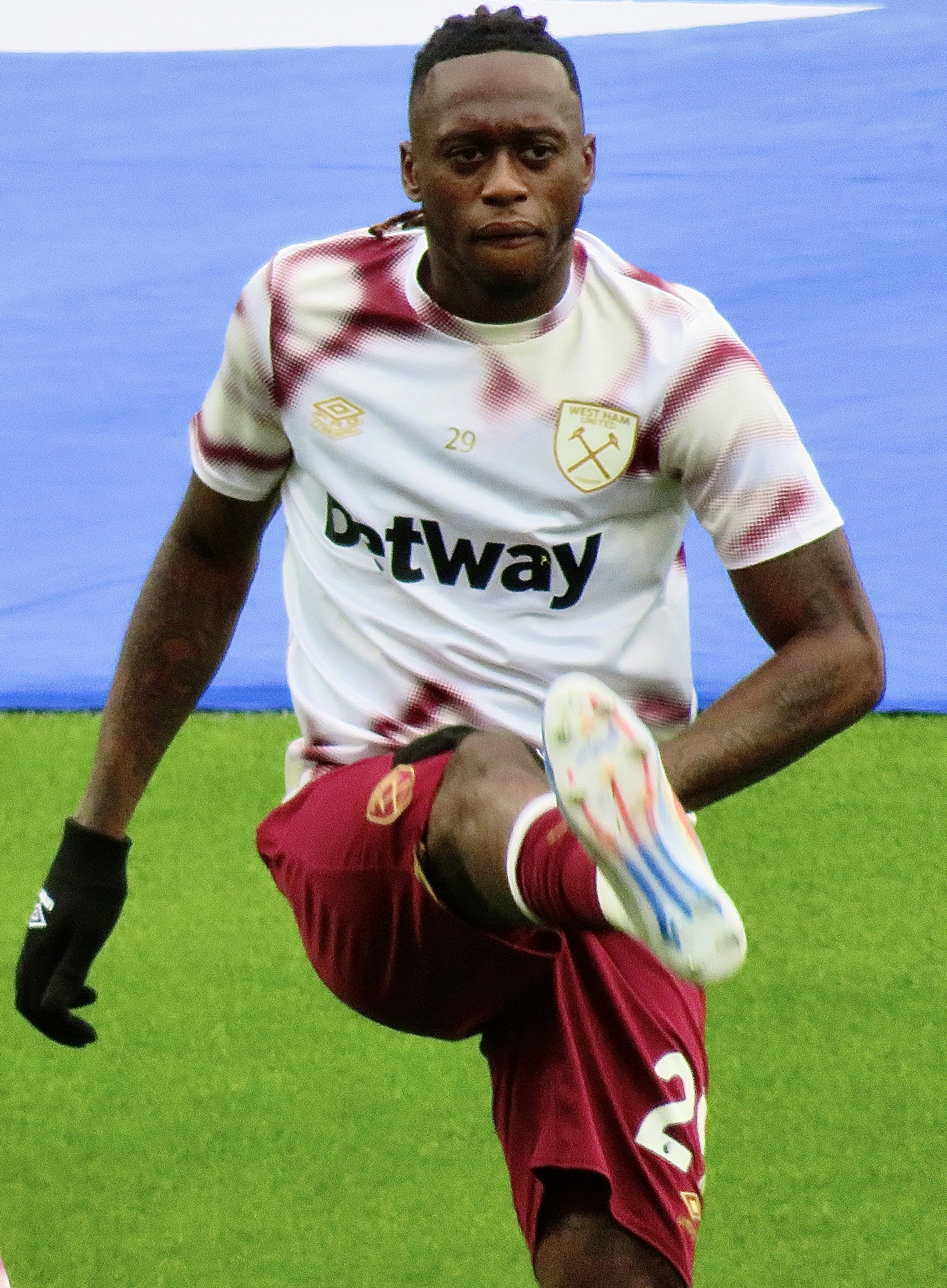
- Wan-Bissaka warming up for West Ham United in 2024

Personal information
- Full name: Aaron Wan-Bissaka
- Date of birth: 26 November 1997 (age 28)
- Place of birth: Croydon, England
- Height: 1.83 m (6 ft 0 in)
- Position: Right-back

Team information
- Current team: Aston Villa (on loan from West Ham United)
- Number: 29

Youth career
- Junior Elite Academy
- 2009–2017: Crystal Palace

Senior career*
Years	Team	Apps	(Gls)
2017–2019	Crystal Palace	42	(0)
2019–2024	Manchester United	130	(2)
2024–	West Ham United	61	(2)
2026–	→ Aston Villa (loan)	7	(0)

International career^{‡}
2015	DR Congo U20	1	(0)
2018	England U20	2	(0)
2018–2019	England U21	3	(0)
2025–	DR Congo	18	(0)
- * Club domestic league appearances and goals as of 21:18, 21 November 2026 (UTC) ‡ National team caps and goals as of 21:03, 28 September 2026 (UTC)

Aaron Wan-Bissaka (born 26 November 1997) is a professional footballer who plays as a right-back for Premier League club Aston Villa, on loan from EFL Championship club West Ham United. Born in England, he plays for the DR Congo national team.

An academy graduate of hometown club Crystal Palace, Wan-Bissaka made his senior debut in 2018, and quickly rose to prominence, being named the club's Player of the Year in his only full season. In 2019, he moved to Manchester United for £50 million, winning an EFL Cup and FA Cup with the club before joining West Ham in 2024.

== Early life ==
Wan-Bissaka was born in Croydon, Greater London and grew up in New Addington, Croydon, where he attended Good Shepherd Catholic Primary School.

== Club career ==
=== Crystal Palace ===
Wan-Bissaka was a member of the Crystal Palace academy from the age of 11, where he started out as a winger. He signed a professional contract with the club in December 2016.

On the 2017 pre-season tour, Wan-Bissaka began to feature with the Palace first team under new manager Frank de Boer, playing in a number of friendlies. The Dutchman played a formation with wing-backs, and this new role emphasised Wan-Bissaka's defensive capabilities, eventually leading to him moving from a winger to a full-back. However, he saw chances limited in the first half of the season as De Boer showed a preference to play Timothy Fosu-Mensah or Martin Kelly at right-back, then new manager Roy Hodgson favoured Joel Ward. He was an unused substitute a few times under the new manager, while also starring for the Eagles U23 side.

On 25 February 2018, Wan-Bissaka made his first-team debut for Crystal Palace, in the midst of an injury crisis, in a Premier League match against Tottenham Hotspur at Selhurst Park which resulted in a 1–0 defeat. He played all but two minutes of the four Palace matches in March, and won the club's Player of the Month award with 65% of the supporters' votes.

On 20 August 2018, Wan-Bissaka was sent off in a 2–0 loss to Liverpool for denying Mohamed Salah a clear goalscoring opportunity. He was named the club's Player of the Month for August, September, October and March. On 7 April 2019, he extended his contract with the club until 2022. Later that month, he was named Crystal Palace Player of the Year for his displays throughout the season.

=== Manchester United ===
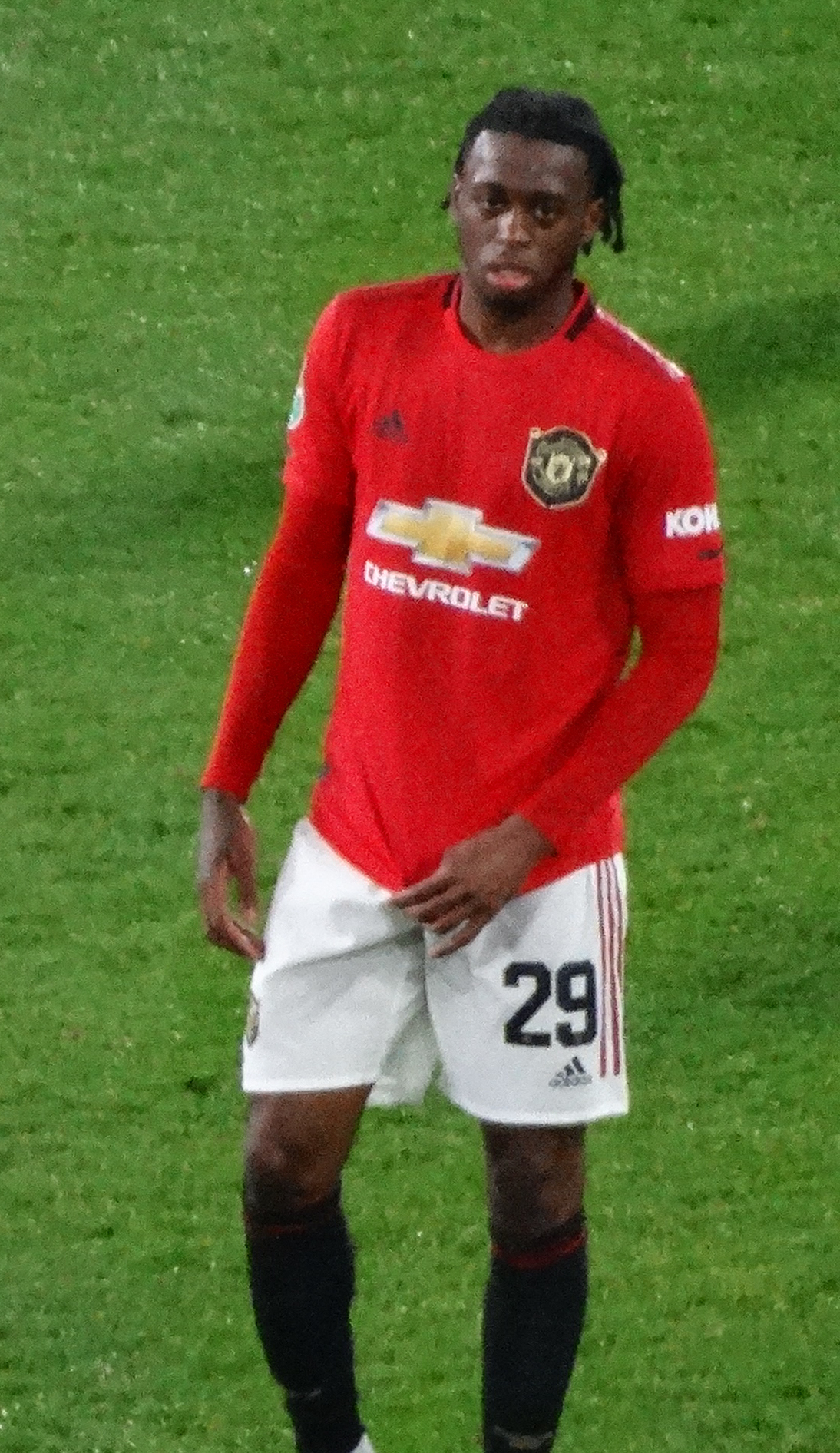
Wan-Bissaka playing for Manchester United in 2019

On 29 June 2019, Wan-Bissaka signed a five-year contract with fellow Premier League club Manchester United. Crystal Palace would receive an initial fee of £45 million, with another £5 million due in potential bonuses. Upon signing for Manchester United, Wan-Bissaka became the sixth-most expensive defender of all time and the most expensive English player who was uncapped by the national side at the time of transfer.

He made his debut for the club on 11 August, playing the full 90 minutes in a 4–0 league victory over Chelsea. At the end of his first season at Manchester United, he made the highest number of tackles in the 2019–20 Premier League season. On 17 October 2020, as United won 4–1 at Newcastle United, he scored the first goal of his professional career. On 2 February 2021, he scored the opening goal in United's Premier League record-equalling 9–0 win over Southampton.

Wan-Bissaka missed a significant part of the first half of the 2022–23 season due to illnesses or injuries, with Diogo Dalot starting at right-back in the majority of United's games. He returned to the pitch after the World Cup break in impressive form, with manager Erik ten Hag praising his improvements.

=== West Ham United ===
On 13 August 2024, West Ham United announced the signing of Wan-Bissaka on a seven-year contract for a reported fee of £15 million. On 25 November, he scored his first goal for the club in a 2–0 victory over Newcastle United at St James' Park. He scored his second consecutive goal in the next game, a 2–5 loss to Arsenal at home in the London Stadium on 30 November. In the 2024–25 season, he led all defenders with 66 interceptions and 64 successful dribbles. In May 2025, he became the 45th different recipient of the club's Hammer of the Year award. He started 36 games of 40 played during the season by the club scoring two goals and providing four assists. He also led the team in tackles and interceptions.

==== Loan to Aston Villa ====
On 21 August 2026, Wan-Bissaka joined Aston Villa on a season-long loan with a conditional obligation to buy.

== International career ==
Wan-Bissaka was born in England and is of Congolese descent. Wan-Bissaka made a single appearance for DR Congo U20s in an 8–0 friendly loss to the England U17s on 7 October 2015. However, he remained eligible to represent the country of his birth and, after impressing for Crystal Palace, Wan-Bissaka was called up to the England under-20 squad in March 2018. He was sent off during his debut against Poland, although England still won 1–0.

Wan-Bissaka was called up to the England U21 squad for the first time in September 2018 and made his debut for them on 6 September, playing 90 minutes in a 0–0 draw with the Netherlands at Carrow Road. On 27 May 2019, Wan-Bissaka was included in England's 23-man squad for the 2019 UEFA European Under-21 Championship. He made one appearance in the tournament, a 2–1 loss against France, in which he scored an own goal.

In August 2019, Wan-Bissaka received his first call-up to the senior England team, ahead of UEFA Euro 2020 qualifiers against Kosovo and Bulgaria, but was forced to withdraw from the squad due to a back injury. Since the withdrawal, competition with the likes of Kyle Walker, Trent Alexander-Arnold, Kieran Trippier and Reece James at right-back meant that Wan-Bissaka had yet to feature for the senior team.

In May 2019, he asserted his intention to pursue an international career with England, stating "the aim is England. I am happy playing with England and representing England, so that is what I am going to continue doing". Wan-Bissaka later expressed an interest in representing his ancestral DR Congo at senior level. Media speculation also supported the claim of his potential nationality switch, even though he had not done so by the end of 2024.

Wan-Bissaka received a call-up to the DR Congo national team for the friendlies against Mali and Madagascar in June 2025.

On 22 August 2025, Wan-Bissaka's request to switch international allegiance to the DR Congo was approved by FIFA. On 5 September 2025, he made his international debut for DR Congo playing in a 4–1 2026 World Cup qualification win against South Sudan at the Juba Stadium in Juba.

In December 2025, Wan-Bissaka was included in the DR Congo squad for the 2025 Africa Cup of Nations in Morocco. It marked his first appearance in the tournament after switching his international allegiance to DR Congo. He was selected as part of Sébastien Desabre's 26-man squad for the competition.

On May 19, 2026, he was included in the 26-man squad selected by head coach Sébastien Desabre to represent the DR Congo at the 2026 FIFA World Cup.

Wan-Bissaka represented DR Congo at the 2026 FIFA World Cup after switching international allegiance in 2025. He started at right-back throughout the tournament, helping the team reach the knockout stage. DR Congo were eliminated in the Round of 32 after a 2–1 defeat to England, with Wan-Bissaka starting against his country of birth.

== Style of play ==
Wan-Bissaka is primarily a defensively minded right-back, known for his pace, slide tackling and ability in one-on-one defensive duels. He was described as the "best one-on-one defender for a full-back in the world" by Jamie Carragher in 2020. In the 2019–20 Premier League season Wan-Bissaka made the joint-highest number of tackles, level with Wilfred Ndidi on 129.

== Personal life ==
In December 2021, Wan-Bissaka was given a six-month driving ban and a £31,500 fine by Leeds Magistrates Court for driving while disqualified and uninsured, and for not giving driver details about two speeding offences. His lawyers said that he was unaware of his offending, as he had not registered his new address with the DVLA.

== Career statistics ==
=== Club ===
As of match played 21 November 2026

Appearances and goals by club, season and competition
Club	Season	League			FA Cup		EFL Cup		Europe		Total	
Club	Season	Division	Apps	Goals	Apps	Goals	Apps	Goals	Apps	Goals	Apps	Goals
Crystal Palace	2016–17	Premier League	0	0	0	0	0	0	—		0	0
Crystal Palace	2017–18	Premier League	7	0	0	0	0	0	—		7	0
Crystal Palace	2018–19	Premier League	35	0	1	0	3	0	—		39	0
Crystal Palace	Total		42	0	1	0	3	0	—		46	0
Manchester United	2019–20	Premier League	35	0	2	0	4	0	5 (Note: Appearances in UEFA Europa League)	0	46	0
Manchester United	2020–21	Premier League	34	2	3	0	2	0	15 (Note: Six appearances in UEFA Champions League, nine appearances in UEFA Europa League)	0	54	2
Manchester United	2021–22	Premier League	20	0	0	0	0	0	6 (Note: Appearances in UEFA Champions League)	0	26	0
Manchester United	2022–23	Premier League	19	0	4	0	5	0	6	0	34	0
Manchester United	2023–24	Premier League	22	0	4	0	1	0	3	0	30	0
Manchester United	Total		130	2	13	0	12	0	35	0	190	2
West Ham United	2024–25	Premier League	36	2	1	0	1	0	—		38	2
West Ham United	2025–26	Premier League	25	0	2	0	0	0	—		27	0
West Ham United	2026–27	Championship	0	0	0	0	0	0	—		0	0
West Ham United	Total		61	2	3	0	1	0	—		65	2
Aston Villa (loan)	2026–27	Premier League	7	0	0	0	1	0	2	0	10	0
Career total			240	4	17	0	17	0	37	0	311	4

=== International ===
As of match played 28 September 2026

Appearances and goals by national team and year
National team	Year	Apps	Goals
DR Congo	2025	8	0
DR Congo	2026	10	0
Total		18	0

== Honours ==
Manchester United

- FA Cup: 2023–24; runner-up: 2022–23
- EFL Cup: 2022–23
- UEFA Europa League runner-up: 2020–21

Individual

- Crystal Palace Young Player of the Year: 2017–18
- Crystal Palace Player of the Year: 2018–19
- UEFA Europa League Squad of the Season: 2020–21
- West Ham United Hammer of the Year: 2024–25
