= John McCormick (footballer, born 1936) =

Scottish footballer

Personal information
- Full name: John McCormick
- Date of birth: 18 July 1936
- Place of birth: Glasgow, Scotland
- Date of death: 2 July 2017 (aged 80)
- Position: Centre back

Youth career
- St Roch's
- Third Lanark

Senior career*
Years	Team	Apps	(Gls)
1959–1964	Third Lanark	112	(0)
1964–1965	Aberdeen	28	(0)
1965–1973	Crystal Palace	194	(6)
1973–19??	Wealdstone	?	(?)

International career
1962	SFL trial v SFA	1	(0)
- * Club domestic league appearances and goals

John McCormick (18 July 1936 – 2 July 2017) was a Scottish professional footballer. Playing as a centre back he made a total of 334 appearances in the Football League and Scottish League, for Third Lanark, Aberdeen and Crystal Palace before moving into non-league football with Wealdstone.

== Playing career ==
=== Third Lanark ===
He began his senior career at Third Lanark, in 1959 to 1965 and helped his hometown club to a third-placed finish in the Scottish First Division in 1961. In the close season of 1964 he moved to Aberdeen after 190 appearances for Lanark, but without scoring.

=== Aberdeen ===
McCormick spent two seasons at Aberdeen making 28 appearances without scoring, before moving to England with teammate Tom White to play for Crystal Palace.

=== Crystal Palace ===
Palace manager Bert Head paid just £1,500 for McCormick's services, on 30 May 1966. White had been Head's main target but it was McCormick, after initially understudying Alan Stephenson, who helped the club to its promotion to the First Division for the first time in 1968–69. In that season, McCormick was ever present making 42 appearances and scoring 3 times. In the top flight he formed a solid defensive partnership with fellow centre-half Mel Blyth and won Palace's first ever "Player of the Year" award at the end of the 1971-72 season. He was awarded a testimonial during the next season.

=== Wealdstone ===
During the early part of the 1972–73 season McCormick lost his place, which was taken by Bobby Bell, and was subsequently allowed to leave on a free transfer. He joined Wealdstone, then managed by former Palace colleague Eddie Presland, and helped the club to win the Southern League division one south in 1973–74.

McCormick owned a hotel near Glasgow for 25 years. He lived in East Kilbride.

He died on 2 July 2017 at the age of 80.
