= 2004–05 Crystal Palace F.C. season =

English football club season

Crystal Palace
2004–05 season
- Chairman: Simon Jordan
- Manager: Iain Dowie
- Stadium: Selhurst Park
- FA Premier League: 18th (relegated)
- FA Cup: Third round
- League Cup: Fourth round
- Top goalscorer: League: Andy Johnson (21); All: Andy Johnson (21)
- Highest home attendance: 26,193 (vs. Arsenal, 6 November)
- Lowest home attendance: 20,705 (vs. Charlton Athletic, 5 December)
- Average home league attendance: 24,108
Home colours	Away colours

During the 2004–05 English football season, Crystal Palace competed in the FA Premier League, following promotion from the First Division (renamed the Championship) the previous season.

== Season summary ==
Despite the 21 league goals of striker Andy Johnson, and being just ahead of the relegation zone for most of the season, Palace were unable to remain in the top flight and were relegated on the last day of the season, following a 2–2 draw with fellow south-east London rivals Charlton Athletic at The Valley, combined with West Bromwich Albion's 2–0 win over Portsmouth. With relegation, speculation reigned over Johnson's future; Johnson even handed in a transfer request, but ultimately the striker would sign a five-year contract with the club with an improved wage, pledging to help the club regain top-flight status.

Young winger Wayne Routledge also impressed with 10 assists in the Premier League, making him more productive than the likes of Arjen Robben and Steven Gerrard in terms of creativity, but he was snapped up by Tottenham Hotspur following Palace's relegation.

== Final league table ==
Pos	Team	Pld	W	D	L	GF	GA	GD	Pts	Qualification or relegation
16	Portsmouth	38	10	9	19	43	59	−16	39	
17	West Bromwich Albion	38	6	16	16	36	61	−25	34	
18	Crystal Palace (R)	38	7	12	19	41	62	−21	33	Relegation to the Football League Championship
19	Norwich City (R)	38	7	12	19	42	77	−35	33	Relegation to the Football League Championship
20	Southampton (R)	38	6	14	18	45	66	−21	32	Relegation to the Football League Championship

Rules for classification: 1) points; 2) goal difference; 3) number of goals scored.
(R) Relegated

== Kit ==
Italian company Diadora became Palace's new kit manufacturers, and introduced a new home kit for the season. The home kit featured red shorts and socks (dispensing with the navy attire of the previous two seasons) and predominantly red shirts with blue stripes. The away kit featured white shirts with blue arms.

Churchill Insurance remained kit sponsors for the fifth consecutive season.

== Staff ==
- Manager: Iain Dowie
- Player-coach: Kit Symons

== Players ==
=== First-team squad ===
Squad at end of season

Note: Flags indicate national team as defined under FIFA eligibility rules; some limited exceptions apply. Players may hold more than one non-FIFA nationality.

No.	Pos.	Nation	Player
1	GK	ARG	Julián Speroni
2	DF	ENG	Danny Butterfield
3	DF	ENG	Danny Granville
5	DF	ENG	Mark Hudson
6	DF	AUS	Tony Popovic
7	MF	ENG	Wayne Routledge
8	FW	ENG	Andy Johnson
9	FW	SCO	Dougie Freedman
10	FW	HUN	Sándor Torghelle
11	FW	ENG	Neil Shipperley
12	MF	ENG	Mikele Leigertwood (Note: Leigertwood was born in Enfield, England, but also qualified to represent Antigua and Barbuda internationally and would make his international debut for Antigua and Barbuda in November 2008.)
14	MF	ENG	Ben Watson
15	MF	FIN	Aki Riihilahti

No.	Pos.	Nation	Player
17	MF	NIR	Michael Hughes
18	DF	ENG	Gary Borrowdale
19	MF	ENG	Tom Soares
20	DF	ENG	Darren Powell
21	DF	ENG	Emmerson Boyce (Note: Boyce was born in Aylesbury, England, but also qualified to represent Barbados internationally through his parents and would make his international debut for Barbados in March 2008.)
22	MF	FIN	Joonas Kolkka
23	FW	ENG	Wayne Andrews
25	DF	ENG	Fitz Hall
26	DF	URU	Gonzalo Sorondo (on loan from Inter Milan)
27	FW	ITA	Nicola Ventola (on loan from Inter Milan)
28	GK	HUN	Gábor Király
32	MF	GRE	Vasilios Lakis
34	MF	AUS	Anthony Danze

=== Left club during season ===
Note: Flags indicate national team as defined under FIFA eligibility rules; some limited exceptions apply. Players may hold more than one non-FIFA nationality.

No.	Pos.	Nation	Player
4	MF	ENG	Shaun Derry (to Leeds United)
13	GK	FRA	Cédric Berthelin (to RAEC Mons)
16	MF	ENG	Tommy Black (on loan to Sheffield United)
20	DF	ENG	Darren Powell (on loan to West Ham United)

No.	Pos.	Nation	Player
23	FW	WAL	Gareth Williams (Note: Williams was born in Johannesburg, South Africa, but also qualified to represent Wales internationally and represented them at U-21 level.) (to Colchester United)
24	FW	ECU	Iván Kaviedes (on loan from Barcelona)
29	DF	ENG	Sam Togwell (on loan to Oxford United)
34	MF	AUS	Anthony Danze (on loan to MK Dons)

=== Reserve squad ===
Squad at end of season

Note: Flags indicate national team as defined under FIFA eligibility rules; some limited exceptions apply. Players may hold more than one non-FIFA nationality.

No.	Pos.	Nation	Player
16	MF	ENG	Tommy Black
29	DF	ENG	Sam Togwell
30	GK	ENG	Lance Cronin
31	FW	ENG	Tyrone Berry

No.	Pos.	Nation	Player
33	DF	WAL	Kit Symons (Note: Symons was born in Basingstoke, England, but also qualified to represent Wales internationally through his father and made his international debut for Wales in February 1992.) (player-coach)
—	DF	ENG	Arron Fray
—	DF	ENG	Glenn Wilson (reserve-team captain)
—	MF	ENG	Lewwis Spence

== Statistics ==
=== Player statistics ===
as 16 May 2005

No.	Pos.	Name	Premier League		FA Cup		League Cup		Total		Discipline	
No.	Pos.	Name	Apps	Goals	Apps	Goals	Apps	Goals	Apps	Goals	Yellow card	Red card
1	GK	(Argentina) Julián Speroni	6	0	0	0	2	0	8	0	0	0
2	DF	(England) Danny Butterfield	7	0	1	0	2	0	10	0	2	0
3	DF	(England) Danny Granville	35	3	1	0	1	0	37	3	7	0
4	MF	(England) Shaun Derry	1 (6)	0	0	0	3	0	4 (6)	0	1	0
5	DF	(England) Mark Hudson	7	1	0	0	2	0	9	1	2	0
6	DF	(Australia) Tony Popovic	21 (2)	0	0	0	0	0	21 (2)	0	4	0
7	MF	(England) Wayne Routledge	38	0	1	0	1	0	40	0	1	0
8	FW	(England) Andy Johnson	37	21	1	1	0	0	38	22	5	0
9	FW	(Scotland) Dougie Freedman	10 (10)	1	0	0	3	2	13 (10)	3	0	0
10	FW	(Hungary) Sandor Torghelle	3 (9)	0	0	0	3	1	6 (9)	1	1	1
11	FW	(England) Neil Shipperley	0 (1)	0	0 (1)	0	0 (1)	0	0 (3)	0	0	0
12	MF	(Antigua and Barbuda) Mikele Leigertwood	16 (4)	1	1	0	2	0	19 (4)	1	4	0
13	GK	(France) Cedric Berthelin	0	0	0	0	0	0	0	0	0	0
14	MF	(England) Ben Watson	16 (5)	0	1	0	2	0	19 (5)	0	3	0
15	MF	(Finland) Aki Riihilahti	28 (4)	4	0	0	0	0	28 (4)	4	3	0
16	MF	(England) Tommy Black	0	0	0	0	0	0	0	0	0	0
17	MF	(Northern Ireland) Michael Hughes	34 (2)	2	1	0	0	0	35 (2)	2	10	0
18	DF	(England) Gary Borrowdale	2 (5)	0	0	0	2 (1)	0	4 (6)	0	0	0
19	MF	(England) Tom Soares	16 (6)	0	0 (1)	0	2 (1)	1	18 (8)	1	4	0
20	DF	(England) Darren Powell	4 (2)	1	1	0	2 (1)	0	7 (3)	1	0	0
21	DF	(Barbados) Emmerson Boyce	26 (1)	0	0	0	1	0	27 (1)	0	2	0
22	MF	(Finland) Joonas Kolkka	20 (3)	3	0	0	1	0	21 (3)	3	2	0
23	FW	(England) Wayne Andrews	0 (9)	0	0	0	0	0	0 (9)	0	1	0
24	FW	(Ecuador) Ivan Kaviedes	1 (3)	0	0	0	0 (2)	0	1 (5)	0	0	0
25	DF	(England) Fitz Hall	36	2	1	0	0	0	37	2	3	0
26	DF	(Uruguay) Gonzalo Sorondo	16 (4)	0	0	0	2	0	18 (4)	0	5	2
27	FW	(Italy) Nicola Ventola	0 (3)	1	0	0	0	0	0 (3)	1	1	0
28	GK	(Hungary) Gabor Kiraly	32	0	1	0	1	0	34	0	3	0
29	MF	(England) Sam Togwell	0	0	0	0	0	0	0	0	0	0
30	GK	(England) Lance Cronin	0	0	0	0	0	0	0	0	0	0
31	FW	(England) Tyrone Berry	0	0	0	0	0	0	0	0	0	0
32	MF	(Greece) Vasilios Lakis	6 (12)	0	1	0	0 (1)	0	7 (13)	0	0	1*
33	DF	(Wales) Kit Symons	0	0	0	0	0	0	0	0	0	0
34	MF	(Australia) Anthony Danze	0	0	0	0	1	0	1	0	0	0

- *= Second yellow card.

== Transfers ==
=== In ===
- (England) Mark Hudson - (England) Fulham, 11 July, £550,000
- (Barbados) Emmerson Boyce - (England) Luton Town, 12 July, free transfer
- (Argentina) Julián Speroni - (Scotland) Dundee, 13 July, £750,000
- (Finland) Joonas Kolkka - (Germany) Borussia Mönchengladbach, 22 July, undisclosed
- (Hungary) Sándor Torghelle - (Hungary) MTK Hungaria, 3 August, undisclosed
- (England) Fitz Hall - (England) Southampton, 12 August, £1,500,000
- (England) Wayne Andrews - (England) Colchester United, 1 September, six-figure fee
- (Uruguay) Gonzalo Sorondo - (Italy) Inter Milan, 31 August, season loan
- (Italy) Nicola Ventola - (Italy) Inter Milan, 31 August, season loan
- (Greece) Vasilios Lakis - (Greece) AEK Athens, unknown date, unknown fee
- (Australia) Anthony Danze - (Australia) Inglewood United, unknown date, unknown fee

=== Out ===
- (England) Julian Gray - (England) Birmingham City, 23 June, free
- (Republic of Ireland) Curtis Fleming - (England) Darlington, 31 July, undisclosed
- (England) Shaun Derry - (England) Leeds United, 23 November, £250,000
- (England) Jamie Smith - (England) Bristol City, August, free
- (England) Ben Surey - Ebbsfleet United
- (Mauritius) Gavin Heeroo - (England) Billericay Town
- (England) Tariq Nabil
- (France) Cédric Berthelin - (Belgium) RAEC Mons
- (Wales) Gareth Williams - (England) Colchester United
- (Ecuador) Iván Kaviedes - (Ecuador) Barcelona Sporting Club, loan ended

== Results ==
=== Premiership ===
==== Results per matchday ====
Matchday	1	2	3	4	5	6	7	8	9	10	11	12	13	14	15	16	17	18	19	20	21	22	23	24	25	26	27	28	29	30	31	32	33	34	35	36	37	38
Ground	A	H	H	A	A	H	A	H	A	H	A	H	A	H	A	H	H	A	H	A	A	H	A	H	A	H	A	H	H	A	H	A	H	A	H	A	H	A
Result	D	L	L	L	L	L	D	W	L	W	W	D	L	L	D	L	D	L	L	D	L	W	L	W	D	L	L	W	D	L	L	L	D	L	W	D	D	D
Position	7	20	20	20	20	20	20	19	20	15	14	15	16	16	16	16	17	18	18	17	18	17	17	17	17	17	17	17	17	17	18	19	19	19	17	18	19	18

A = Away; H = Home; W = Win; D = Draw; L = Loss

14 August 2004 1	Norwich City	1–1	Crystal Palace	Norwich, Norfolk
15:00 BST (UTC+01:00)	Huckerby 16'	Report	Johnson 73'	Stadium: Carrow Road; Attendance: 23,717; Referee: Peter Walton

21 August 2004 2	Crystal Palace	1–3	Everton	Croydon, London
BST (UTC+01:00)	Hudson 9'	Report	Gravesen 19' (pen.), 62'; Naysmith (red card) 71'; Bent 82'	Stadium: Selhurst Park; Attendance: 23,666; Referee: Mark Clattenburg

24 August 2004 3	Crystal Palace	0–2	Chelsea	Croydon, London
BST (UTC+01:00)		Report	Drogba 28'; Mendes 72'	Stadium: Selhurst Park; Attendance: 24,953; Referee: Chris Foy

28 August 2004 4	Middlesbrough	2–1	Crystal Palace	Middlesbrough, North Yorkshire
BST (UTC+01:00)	Popovic 61' (o.g.); Hasselbaink 78'	Report	Johnson 52' (pen.)	Stadium: Riverside Stadium; Attendance: 31,560; Referee: Mike Dean

11 September 2004 5	Portsmouth	3–1	Crystal Palace	Portsmouth, Hampshire
BST (UTC+01:00)	Fuller 3'; Berger 47'; Popovic 84' (o.g.)	Report	Granville 43'	Stadium: Fratton Park; Attendance: 20,019; Referee: Phil Dowd

18 September 2004 6	Crystal Palace	1–2	Manchester City	Croydon, London
BST (UTC+01:00)	Johnson 77' (pen.)	Report	Anelka 55', 64' (pen.)	Stadium: Selhurst Park; Attendance: 25,052; Referee: Martin Atkinson

25 September 2004 7	Aston Villa	1–1	Crystal Palace	Birmingham, West Midlands
BST (UTC+01:00)	Hendrie 36'	Report	Johnson 6'	Stadium: Villa Park; Attendance: 31,560; Referee: Mark Clattenburg

4 October 2004 8	Crystal Palace	2–0	Fulham	Croydon, London
BST (UTC+01:00)	Johnson 53'; Riihilahti 69'	Report	Pearce (red card) 6'	Stadium: Selhurst Park; Attendance: 21,825; Referee: Mike Riley

16 October 2004 9	Bolton Wanderers	1–0	Crystal Palace	Bolton, Greater Manchester
BST (UTC+01:00)	Davies 45'	Report		Stadium: Reebok Stadium; Attendance: 25,501; Referee: Neale Barry

23 October 2004 10	Crystal Palace	3–0	West Bromwich Albion	Croydon, London
BST (UTC+01:00)	Hall 5'; Johnson 12' (pen.), 50'	Report		Stadium: Selhurst Park; Attendance: 22,922; Referee: Matt Messias

30 October 2004 11	Birmingham City	0–1	Crystal Palace	Birmingham, West Midlands
BST (UTC+01:00)		Report	Johnson 41'	Stadium: St Andrew's; Attendance: Dermot Gallagher; Referee: 28,916

6 November 2004 12	Crystal Palace	1–1	Arsenal	Croydon, London
GMT (UTC)	Riihilahti 65'	Report	Henry 63'	Stadium: Selhurst Park; Attendance: 26,193; Referee: Mike Dean

13 November 2004 13	Liverpool	3–2	Crystal Palace	Liverpool, Merseyside
GMT (UTC)	Baroš 23' (pen.), 45', 90' (pen.)	Report	Kolkka 44'; Hughes 52'	Stadium: Anfield; Attendance: 42,862; Referee: Phil Dowd

20 November 2004 14	Crystal Palace	0–2	Newcastle United	Croydon, London
GMT (UTC)		Report	Kluivert 79'; Bellamy 88'	Stadium: Selhurst Park; Attendance: 22,937; Referee: Mark Halsey

27 November 2004 15	Southampton	2–2	Crystal Palace	Southampton, Hampshire
GMT (UTC)	Phillips 50'; Jakobsson 76'	Report	Johnson 48'; Jakobsson 54' (o.g.)	Stadium: St. Mary's Stadium; Attendance: 31,833; Referee: Peter Walton

5 December 2004 16	Crystal Palace	0–1	Charlton Athletic	Croydon, London
GMT (UTC)		Report	Rommedahl 90'	Stadium: Selhurst Park; Attendance: 20,705; Referee: Matt Messias

11 December 2004 17	Crystal Palace	0–0	Blackburn Rovers	Croydon, London
GMT (UTC)		Report	Thompson (red card) 88'	Stadium: Selhurst Park; Attendance: 22,010; Referee: Alan Wiley

18 December 2004 18	Manchester United	5–2	Crystal Palace	Trafford, Greater Manchester
GMT (UTC)	Scholes 22', 49'; Smith 35'; Boyce 48' (o.g.); O'Shea 90'	Report	Granville 27'; Kolkka 46'	Stadium: Old Trafford; Attendance: 67,814; Referee: Steve Dunn

26 December 2004 19	Crystal Palace	0–1	Portsmouth	Croydon, London
GMT (UTC)		Report	Primus 69'	Stadium: Selhurst Park; Attendance: 25,238; Referee: Neale Barry

28 December 2004 20	Tottenham Hotspur	1–1	Crystal Palace	Haringey, London
GMT (UTC)	Defoe 54'	Report	Johnson 79'	Stadium: White Hart Lane; Attendance: 36,100; Referee: Uriah Rennie

1 January 2005 21	Fulham	3–1	Crystal Palace	Fulham, London
GMT (UTC)	Cole 4', 60'; Radzinski 73'	Report	Johnson 35' (pen.)	Stadium: Craven Cottage; Attendance: 18,680; Referee: Dermot Gallagher

3 January 2005 22	Crystal Palace	2–0	Aston Villa	Croydon, London
GMT (UTC)	Johnson 33', 66' (pen.)	Report		Stadium: Selhurst Park; Attendance: 24,140; Referee: Andy D'Urso

15 January 2005 23	Manchester City	3–1	Crystal Palace	Manchester
GMT (UTC)	S. Wright-Phillips 12', 90'; Fowler 15'	Report	Powell 32'	Stadium: City of Manchester Stadium; Attendance: 44,010; Referee: Andre Marriner

22 January 2005 24	Crystal Palace	3–0	Tottenham Hotspur	Croydon, London
GMT (UTC)	Leigertwood 64'; Granville 70'; Johnson 77'	Report		Stadium: Selhurst Park; Attendance: 23,723; Referee: Chris Foy

1 February 2005 25	West Bromwich Albion	2–2	Crystal Palace	West Bromwich, West Midlands
GMT (UTC)	Campbell 82'; Earnshaw 90'	Report	Sorondo (red card) 12'; Johnson 47'; Riihilahti 90'	Stadium: The Hawthorns; Attendance: 25,092; Referee: Dermot Gallagher

11 February 2005 26	Crystal Palace	0–1	Bolton Wanderers	Croydon, London
GMT (UTC)		Report	Nolan 31'	Stadium: Selhurst Park; Attendance: 23,163; Referee: Graham Poll

14 February 2005 27	Arsenal	5–1	Crystal Palace	Islington, London
GMT (UTC)	Bergkamp 32'; Reyes 35'; Henry 39', 77'; Vieira 54'	Report	Johnson 63' (pen.)	Stadium: Highbury; Attendance: 38,056; Referee: Rob Styles

26 February 2005 28	Crystal Palace	2–0	Birmingham City	Croydon, London
15:00 GMT (UTC)	Johnson 41' (pen.), 68' (pen.)	Report		Stadium: Selhurst Park; Attendance: 23,376; Referee: Phil Dowd

5 March 2005 29	Crystal Palace	0–0	Manchester United	Croydon, London
GMT (UTC)	Lakis (red card) 64'	Report		Stadium: Selhurst Park; Attendance: 26,021; Referee: Mark Clattenburg

19 March 2005 30	Chelsea	4–1	Crystal Palace	Fulham, London
GMT (UTC)	Lampard 29'; J. Cole 54'; Kežman 78', 90'	Report	Riihilahti 42'	Stadium: Stamford Bridge; Attendance: 41,667; Referee: Phil Dowd

2 April 2005 31	Crystal Palace	0–1	Middlesbrough	Croydon, London
BST (UTC+01:00)		Report	Queudrue 35'	Stadium: Selhurst Park; Attendance: 24,274; Referee: Steve Dunn

10 April 2005 32	Everton	4–0	Crystal Palace	Liverpool, Merseyside
BST (UTC+01:00)	Arteta 7'; Cahill 47', 54'; Vaughan 87'	Report		Stadium: Goodison Park; Attendance: 36,519; Referee: Uriah Rennie

16 April 2005 33	Crystal Palace	3–3	Norwich City	Croydon, London
15:00 BST (UTC+01:00)	Kolkka 5'; Hughes 73'; Johnson 83' (pen.)	Report	Ashton 22', 46'; McKenzie 53'	Stadium: Selhurst Park; Attendance: 25,754; Referee: Rob Styles

20 April 2005 34	Blackburn Rovers	1–0	Crystal Palace	Blackburn, Lancashire
BST (UTC+01:00)	Pedersen 45'	Report		Stadium: Ewood Park; Attendance: 18,006; Referee: Peter Walton

23 April 2005 35	Crystal Palace	1–0	Liverpool	Croydon, London
BST (UTC+01:00)	Johnson 35'	Report		Stadium: Selhurst Park; Attendance: 26,043; Referee: Dermot Gallagher

30 April 2005 36	Newcastle United	0–0	Crystal Palace	Newcastle upon Tyne, Tyne and Wear
BST (UTC+01:00)		Report		Stadium: St James' Park; Attendance: 52,123; Referee: Alan Wiley

7 May 2005 37	Crystal Palace	2–2	Southampton	Croydon, London
BST (UTC+01:00)	Hall 34'; Sorondo (red card) 59'; Ventola 72'	Report	Crouch 37' (pen.) (red card) 58'; Higginbotham 90'	Stadium: Selhurst Park; Attendance: 26,066; Referee: Howard Webb

15 May 2005 38	Charlton Athletic	2–2	Crystal Palace	Greenwich, London
BST (UTC+01:00)	Hughes 30'; Fortune 82'	Report	Freedman 58'; Johnson 71' (pen.)	Stadium: The Valley; Attendance: 26,870; Referee: Mark Clattenburg

=== League Cup ===
21 September 2004	Crystal Palace	2–1 (a.e.t.)	Hartlepool United	Croydon, London
BST (UTC+01:00)	Freedman 80'; Soares 110'	Report	Williams 70'	Stadium: Selhurst Park; Attendance: 4,233; Referee: Kevin Wright

27 October 2004	Charlton Athletic	1–2	Crystal Palace	Charlton, London
BST (UTC+01:00)	Hreidarsson 5'	Report	Freedman 41'; Torghelle 54', (red card) 70'	Stadium: The Valley; Attendance: 19,030; Referee: Rob Styles

10 November 2004	Manchester United	2–0	Crystal Palace	Trafford, Greater Manchester
GMT (UTC)	Saha 22'; Richardson 39'	Report		Stadium: Old Trafford; Attendance: 48,891; Referee: Steve Dunn

=== FA Cup ===
6 January 2005 Third round	Sunderland	2–1	Crystal Palace	Sunderland, Wearside
GMT (UTC)	Welsh 44'; Stewart 60' (pen.)	Report	Collins 40' (o.g.)	Stadium: Stadium of Light; Attendance: 17,536; Referee: Rob Styles

== Awards ==
- Andy Johnson: Premier League Player of the Month, October
- Club Goal of the Season: Joonas Kolkka (vs. Liverpool, at Anfield, Premiership)
