= 2005–06 Crystal Palace F.C. season =

English football club season

Crystal Palace
2005–06 season
- Chairman: (England) Simon Jordan
- Manager: (Northern Ireland) Iain Dowie
- Stadium: Selhurst Park
- Championship: 6th (qualified for play-offs)
- Play-offs: Semi-finals
- FA Cup: Fourth round
- League Cup: Fourth round
- Top goalscorer: League: Andrew Johnson (15); All: Andrew Johnson (17)
- Highest home attendance: 23,843 (vs. Leeds United, 4 March 2006)
- Lowest home attendance: 17,291 (vs. Preston North End, 24 September 2005)
- Average home league attendance: 19,457
Home colours	Away colours

During the 2005–06 English football season, Crystal Palace F.C. competed in the Football League Championship, following relegation from the FA Premier League the previous season.

== Season summary ==
Crystal Palace had been boosted by the decision by the Premiership's top English goalscorer of the previous season, Andrew Johnson, to remain with the Londoners to fire their bid for a return to the top flight. Although Johnson was less prolific this season, scoring only 15 goals, Palace reached the play-offs in sixth place – the position they had finished in the promotion season of 2004. Palace faced third-placed Watford in the semi-finals – they were comprehensively beaten 3–0 in the first leg, and were only able to draw the second leg 0–0, consigning Palace to another season in the Championship. Manager Iain Dowie was soon on his way out, leaving by mutual consent on 22 May. Dowie claimed he wanted to be closer to his family in the north; he would take up the vacancy at London rivals Charlton Athletic a mere eight days later. He was followed out of Selhurst Park by Johnson, who snubbed Wigan Athletic and Bolton Wanderers to join Everton for £8.6 million.

In June, Palace appointed Hull City manager (and former Palace winger) Peter Taylor as Dowie's successor.

== Kit ==
Italian company Diadora remained Palace's kit manufacturers, and introduced a new home kit for the season. Unlike the previous season's kit, which was mainly red, the new kit was predominantly blue, complemented by a single thick red stripe down the centre of the shirt. For the club's centenary the club wore a commemorative kit on 27 July, 27 September and 22 October: the kit recalled one worn by the club in the 1970s, which featured white shorts and socks and a white shirt with two stripes of sky blue and claret (the club's original colours) in the centre.

Churchill Insurance remained kit sponsors for the sixth consecutive season.

== Final league table ==
Pos	Team	Pld	W	D	L	GF	GA	GD	Pts	Promotion, qualification or relegation
4	Preston North End	46	20	20	6	59	30	+29	80	Qualification for Championship play-offs
5	Leeds United	46	21	15	10	57	38	+19	78	Qualification for Championship play-offs
6	Crystal Palace	46	21	12	13	67	48	+19	75	Qualification for Championship play-offs
7	Wolverhampton Wanderers	46	16	19	11	50	42	+8	67	
8	Coventry City	46	16	15	15	62	65	−3	63	

Updated to match(es) played on 2 December 2011. Source: RSSSF
Rules for classification: 1) points; 2) goal difference; 3) number of goals scored.

== Squad statistics ==
=== Appearances and goals ===
As of 9 May 2006
Players with no appearances not included in the list

No.	Pos	Nat	Player	Total		Championship		FA Cup		League Cup		Championship play-offs	
No.	Pos	Nat	Player	Apps	Goals	Apps	Goals	Apps	Goals	Apps	Goals	Apps	Goals
1	GK	(Hungary) HUN	Gábor Király	48	0	43+0	0	3+0	0	0+0	0	2+0	0
3	DF	(England) ENG	Danny Granville	1	1	0+0	0	0+0	0	1+0	1	0+0	0
4	DF	(England) ENG	Darren Ward	46	6	42+1	5	2+0	1	0+0	0	1+0	0
5	DF	(England) ENG	Mark Hudson	22	0	8+7	0	3+0	0	4+0	0	0+0	0
6	DF	(Australia) AUS	Tony Popovic	15	1	10+0	0	1+0	0	2+0	1	2+0	0
7	MF	(Jamaica) JAM	Jobi McAnuff	47	8	35+6	7	2+0	1	2+0	0	2+0	0
8	FW	(England) ENG	Andy Johnson	39	17	30+3	15	3+0	2	1+0	0	2+0	0
9	FW	(Scotland) SCO	Dougie Freedman	41	8	19+15	6	3+0	1	1+1	1	1+1	0
10	FW	(Republic of Ireland) IRL	Jon Macken	28	2	13+11	2	0+2	0	1+0	0	0+1	0
11	FW	(Republic of Ireland) IRL	Clinton Morrison	44	13	32+8	13	1+0	0	1+1	0	1+0	0
12	DF	(Antigua and Barbuda) ATG	Mikele Leigertwood	30	0	18+9	0	1+0	0	1+0	0	1+0	0
14	MF	(England) ENG	Ben Watson	48	4	40+2	4	2+0	0	2+0	0	1+1	0
15	MF	(Finland) FIN	Aki Riihilahti	20	2	9+6	2	1+2	0	2+0	0	0+0	0
16	FW	(England) ENG	Tommy Black	6	0	0+1	0	0+1	0	2+2	0	0+0	0
17	MF	(Northern Ireland) NIR	Michael Hughes	45	4	30+10	2	1+0	1	2+0	1	2+0	0
18	DF	(England) ENG	Gary Borrowdale	35	0	26+4	0	2+0	0	2+0	0	1+0	0
19	MF	(England) ENG	Tom Soares	49	1	38+6	1	1+1	0	1+0	0	2+0	0
20	DF	(England) ENG	Danny Butterfield	16	0	9+4	0	0+0	0	2+0	0	0+1	0
21	DF	(Barbados) BRB	Emmerson Boyce	49	1	42+0	1	3+0	0	2+0	0	2+0	0
22	MF	(Germany) GER	Marco Reich	26	4	14+7	2	1+1	0	1+1	2	0+1	0
23	FW	(England) ENG	Wayne Andrews	31	1	5+19	1	2+1	0	3+1	0	0+0	0
25	DF	(England) ENG	Fitz Hall	44	1	39+0	1	1+0	0	2+0	0	2+0	0
28	GK	(Argentina) ARG	Julián Speroni	8	0	3+1	0	0+0	0	4+0	0	0+0	0
29	DF	(England) ENG	Sam Togwell	3	0	0+0	0	0+0	0	1+2	0	0+0	0
37	DF	(England) ENG	Arron Fray	2	0	0+0	0	0+0	0	2+0	0	0+0	0
39	FW	(England) ENG	Lewis Grabban	2	0	0+0	0	0+0	0	0+2	0	0+0	0
Players left the club during the season:
22	MF	(Finland) FIN	Joonas Kolkka	4	0	1+2	0	0+0	0	1+0	0	0+0	0
27	MF	(Australia) AUS	Anthony Danze	1	0	0+0	0	0+0	0	1+0	0	0+0	0
31	FW	(England) ENG	Tyrone Berry	3	0	0+0	0	0+1	0	0+2	0	0+0	0

== Results ==
Crystal Palace's score comes first

=== Legend ===
Win	Draw	Loss

=== Football League Championship ===
Date	Opponent	Venue	Result	Attendance	Scorers
6 August 2005	Luton Town	H	1–2	21,166	Johnson
9 August 2005	Wolverhampton Wanderers	A	1–2	24,745	McAnuff
13 August 2005	Norwich City	A	1–1	25,102	Johnson
20 August 2005	Plymouth Argyle	H	1–0	18,781	Ward
27 August 2005	Stoke City	H	2–0	17,637	Johnson (2)
10 September 2005	Hull City	H	2–0	18,630	Morrison, Johnson
13 September 2005	Reading	A	2–3	17,562	Johnson, Morrison
17 September 2005	Cardiff City	A	0–1	11,647	
24 September 2005	Preston North End	H	1–1	17,291	Morrison
27 September 2005	Sheffield Wednesday	H	2–0	17,413	Morrison, Whelan (own goal)
3 October 2005	Queens Park Rangers	A	3–1	13,433	Reich (2), Soares
15 October 2005	Coventry City	A	4–1	24,438	Ward, Morrison, Watson, Macken
18 October 2005	Brighton & Hove Albion	H	0–1	22,400	
22 October 2005	Burnley	H	2–0	20,127	Morrison, Freedman
29 October 2005	Crewe Alexandra	A	2–2	6,766	Freedman, Morrison
5 November 2005	Sheffield United	H	2–3	20,344	Hughes, Freedman (pen)
20 November 2005	Brighton & Hove Albion	A	3–2	7,067	Freedman (2), McAnuff
22 November 2005	Coventry City	H	2–0	17,343	Andrews, Boyce
26 November 2005	Luton Town	A	0–2	10,248	
3 December 2005	Millwall	H	1–1	19,571	Watson
10 December 2005	Wolverhampton Wanderers	H	1–1	19,385	Johnson
17 December 2005	Plymouth Argyle	A	0–2	14,582	
26 December 2005	Ipswich Town	A	2–0	27,392	Macken, Hughes
28 December 2005	Derby County	H	2–0	18,978	Morrison, Ward
31 December 2005	Watford	A	2–1	15,856	Ward, Johnson (pen)
2 January 2006	Leicester City	H	2–0	20,089	McAnuff, Johnson
14 January 2006	Hull City	A	2–1	18,886	Ward, Cort (own goal)
20 January 2006	Reading	H	1–1	19,888	Johnson (pen)
25 January 2006	Southampton	A	0–0	24,651	
31 January 2006	Preston North End	A	0–2	13,867	
4 February 2006	Cardiff City	H	1–0	17,962	Riihilahti
11 February 2006	Sheffield Wednesday	A	0–0	24,784	
14 February 2006	Queens Park Rangers	H	2–1	17,550	Morrison, McAnuff
18 February 2006	Millwall	A	1–1	12,296	Watson
25 February 2006	Norwich City	H	4–1	19,066	Johnson, Watson, Morrison, Hall
4 March 2006	Leeds United	H	1–2	23,843	McAnuff
13 March 2006	Stoke City	A	3–1	10,121	Sidibe (own goal), McAnuff, Johnson
18 March 2006	Ipswich Town	H	2–2	22,076	Riihilahti, Morrison
21 March 2006	Leeds United	A	1–0	24,507	McAnuff
25 March 2006	Derby County	A	1–2	24,857	Morrison
31 March 2006	Watford	H	3–1	18,619	Freedman, Stewart (own goal), DeMerit (own goal)
7 April 2006	Leicester City	A	0–2	23,211	
15 April 2006	Crewe Alexandra	H	2–2	18,358	Johnson (2)
17 April 2006	Burnley	A	0–0	11,449	
22 April 2006	Southampton	H	2–1	20,995	Johnson, Morrison
30 April 2006	Sheffield United	A	0–1	27,120	

=== Championship play-offs ===
Round	Date	Opponent	Venue	Result	Attendance	Goalscorers
SF 1st Leg	6 May 2006	Watford	H	0–3	22,880	
SF 2nd Leg	9 May 2006	Watford	A	0–0 (lost 0–3 on agg)	19,041	

=== FA Cup ===
Round	Date	Opponent	Venue	Result	Attendance	Goalscorers
R3	7 January 2006	Northampton Town	H	4–1	10,391	Hughes, McAnuff, Johnson (pen), Freedman (pen)
R4	28 January 2006	Preston North End	A	1–1	9,489	Johnson
R4R	7 February 2006	Preston North End	H	1–2	7,356	Ward

=== League Cup ===
Round	Date	Opponent	Venue	Result	Attendance	Goalscorers
R1	23 August 2005	Walsall	H	3–0	5,508	Popovic (pen), Granville, Hughes
R2	20 September 2005	Coventry City	H	1–0	5,341	Reich
R3	25 October 2005	Liverpool	H	2–1	19,673	Freedman, Reich
R4	30 November 2005	Middlesbrough	A	1–2	10,791	Queudrue (own goal)

== First-team squad ==
Note: Flags indicate national team as defined under FIFA eligibility rules; some limited exceptions apply. Players may hold more than one non-FIFA nationality.

No.	Pos.	Nation	Player
1	GK	HUN	Gábor Király
3	DF	ENG	Danny Granville
4	DF	ENG	Darren Ward
5	DF	ENG	Mark Hudson
6	DF	AUS	Tony Popovic (captain)
7	MF	JAM	Jobi McAnuff (Note: McAnuff was born in Enfield, England, but also qualified to represent Jamaica internationally through his father and made his international debut for Jamaica in May 2002.)
8	FW	ENG	Andy Johnson
9	FW	SCO	Dougie Freedman
10	FW	IRL	Jon Macken (Note: Macken was born in Blackley, England, and represented them at U-20 level, but also qualified to represent the Republic of Ireland internationally and made his international debut for the Republic of Ireland in August 2004.)
11	FW	IRL	Clinton Morrison (Note: Morrison was born in Wandsworth, England, but also qualified to represent the Republic of Ireland internationally through his grandmother and made his international debut for the Republic of Ireland in August 2001.)
12	MF	ENG	Mikele Leigertwood (Note: Leigertwood was born in Enfield, England, but also qualified to represent Antigua and Barbuda internationally and would make his international debut for Antigua and Barbuda in November 2008.)
14	MF	ENG	Ben Watson
15	MF	FIN	Aki Riihilahti
16	MF	ENG	Tommy Black

No.	Pos.	Nation	Player
17	MF	NIR	Michael Hughes
18	DF	ENG	Gary Borrowdale
19	MF	ENG	Tom Soares
20	DF	ENG	Danny Butterfield
21	DF	ENG	Emmerson Boyce (Note: Boyce was born in Aylesbury, England, but also qualified to represent Barbados internationally through his parents and would make his international debut for Barbados in March 2008.)
22	MF	GER	Marco Reich
23	FW	ENG	Wayne Andrews
25	DF	ENG	Fitz Hall
28	GK	ARG	Julián Speroni
29	DF	ENG	Sam Togwell
32	MF	ENG	Ryan Hall
36	DF	ENG	Glenn Wilson
37	DF	ENG	Arron Fray
39	FW	ENG	Lewis Grabban

=== Left club during season ===
Note: Flags indicate national team as defined under FIFA eligibility rules; some limited exceptions apply. Players may hold more than one non-FIFA nationality.

No.	Pos.	Nation	Player
22	MF	FIN	Joonas Kolkka (to ADO Den Haag)
27	MF	AUS	Anthony Danze (released)

No.	Pos.	Nation	Player
30	FW	HUN	Sándor Torghelle (on loan to Panathinaikos)
31	FW	ENG	Tyrone Berry (to Rushden & Diamonds)

== Transfers ==
=== In ===
- (Jamaica) Jobi McAnuff – (Wales) Cardiff City, £600,000, 31 May 2005
- (England) Darren Ward – (England) Millwall, £1,100,000,
- (Republic of Ireland) Jonathan Macken – (England) Manchester City
- (Germany) Marco Reich – (England) Derby County

=== Out ===
- (England) Wayne Routledge – (England) Tottenham Hotspur
- (England) Darren Powell - (England) Southampton, free, 1 July 2005
- (Hungary) Sándor Torghelle – (Greece) Panathinaikos, season loan
