= 2016–17 Crystal Palace F.C. season =

English football club season

Crystal Palace
2016–17 season
- Owner: Steve Parish; David Blitzer; Josh Harris
- Chairman: Steve Parish
- Manager: Alan Pardew (until 22 December 2016); Sam Allardyce (from 23 December 2016)
- Stadium: Selhurst Park
- Premier League: 14th
- FA Cup: Fourth round (eliminated by Manchester City)
- League Cup: Third round (eliminated by Southampton)
- Top goalscorer: League: Christian Benteke (15); All: Christian Benteke (17)
- Average home league attendance: 25,161
Home colours	Away colours	Third colours

The 2016–17 season was Crystal Palace's fourth consecutive season in the Premier League and their 111th year in existence. This season, Crystal Palace participated in the Premier League, FA Cup and League Cup. The season covers the period from 1 July 2016 to 30 June 2017.

== Competitions ==
=== Overview ===
Competition	Record							
Competition	G	W	D	L	GF	GA	GD	Win %
Premier League	38	12	5	21	50	63	−13	31.58
FA Cup	3	1	1	1	2	4	−2	33.33
League Cup	2	1	0	1	2	2	+0	50.00
Total	43	14	6	23	54	69	−15	32.56

Updated to match played 21 May 2017
Source: Competitions

=== Premier League ===
==== League table ====
Pos	Team	Pld	W	D	L	GF	GA	GD	Pts
12	Leicester City	38	12	8	18	48	63	−15	44
13	Stoke City	38	11	11	16	41	56	−15	44
14	Crystal Palace	38	12	5	21	50	63	−13	41
15	Swansea City	38	12	5	21	45	70	−25	41
16	Burnley	38	11	7	20	39	55	−16	40

Source: Premier League
Rules for classification: 1) Points; 2) Goal difference; 3) Goals scored; 4) Play-offs (only if needed to decide champion, teams for relegation or teams for UEFA competitions).

==== Results summary ====
Overall								Home						Away					
Pld	W	D	L	GF	GA	GD	Pts	W	D	L	GF	GA	GD	W	D	L	GF	GA	GD
38	12	5	21	50	63	−13	41	6	2	11	24	25	−1	6	3	10	26	38	−12

Last updated: 21 May 2017.
Source: Premier League

==== Results by matchday ====
Matchday	1	2	3	4	5	6	7	8	9	10	11	12	13	14	15	16	17	18	19	20	21	22	23	24	25	26	27	28	29	30	31	32	33	34	35	36	37	38
Ground	H	A	H	A	H	A	A	H	A	H	A	H	A	H	A	H	H	A	A	H	A	H	A	H	A	H	A	H	A	A	H	H	A	H	H	A	H	A
Result	L	L	D	W	W	W	D	L	L	L	L	L	L	W	D	L	L	D	L	L	L	L	W	L	L	W	W	W	W	L	W	D	W	L	L	L	W	L
Position	19	19	17	11	8	7	8	9	11	13	16	16	17	14	15	16	17	17	17	17	17	18	18	19	19	18	17	16	16	16	16	15	12	12	16	16	13	14

Updated to match(es) played on 21 May 2017. Source:
A = Away; H = Home; W = Win; D = Draw; L = Loss

==== Matches ====
Win Draw Loss

13 August 2016 1	Crystal Palace	0–1	West Bromwich Albion	Selhurst
15:00 BST	Zaha (yellow card) 84'; Bolasie (yellow card) 87'	Report	Dawson (yellow card) 35'; Rondón 74'; Evans (yellow card) 84'	Stadium: Selhurst Park; Attendance: 24490; Referee: Craig Pawson

20 August 2016 2	Tottenham Hotspur	1–0	Crystal Palace	Tottenham
15:00 BST	Walker (yellow card) 60'; Vertonghen (yellow card) 68'; Dier (yellow card) 77'; Wanyama 83'	Report	Zaha (yellow card) 26'; Dann (yellow card) 66'; Townsend (yellow card) 88'	Stadium: White Hart Lane; Attendance: 31,447; Referee: Michael Oliver

27 August 2016 3	Crystal Palace	1–1	AFC Bournemouth	Selhurst
15:00 BST	Cabaye (penalty missed) 16' (yellow card) 16'; Delaney (yellow card) 45'; Dann 90+3'	Report	King 11'; Boruc (yellow card) 56'	Stadium: Selhurst Park; Attendance: 23,503; Referee: Mike Dean

10 September 2016 4	Middlesbrough	1–2	Crystal Palace	Middlesbrough
15:00 BST	Ayala 38'; Ramírez (yellow card) 60'	Report	C. Benteke 15'; Zaha 47', (yellow card) 90+5'; Ward (yellow card) 82'	Stadium: Riverside Stadium; Attendance: 30,551; Referee: Neil Swarbrick

18 September 2016 5	Crystal Palace	4–1	Stoke City	Selhurst
14:15 BST	Tomkins 9'; Dann 11'; McArthur (yellow card) 60', (goal) 71'; Townsend 75'; Puncheon (yellow card) 77'	Report	Arnautović (yellow card) 71', (goal) 90+4'	Stadium: Selhurst Park; Attendance: 23,781; Referee: Craig Pawson

24 September 2016 6	Sunderland	2–3	Crystal Palace	Sunderland
15:00 BST	Defoe 39', 60'	Report	Cabaye (yellow card) 45+4'; Ledley 61'; Puncheon (yellow card) 72'; McArthur 76'; C. Benteke 90+4'	Stadium: Stadium of Light; Attendance: 38,941; Referee: Anthony Taylor

30 September 2016 7	Everton	1–1	Crystal Palace	Liverpool
20:00 BST	Oviedo (yellow card) 16'; Lukaku 35'; Barry (yellow card) 68'; Gueye (yellow card) 78'; Bolasie (yellow card) 89'; Cleverley (yellow card) 90+4'	Report	Puncheon (yellow card) 26'; Tomkins (yellow card) 45+1'; C. Benteke 50', (yellow card) 52'; Townsend (yellow card) 67'	Stadium: Goodison Park; Attendance: 38,758; Referee: Jon Moss

15 October 2016 8	Crystal Palace	0–1	West Ham United	Selhurst
17:30 BST	C. Benteke (penalty missed) 45+1' (yellow card) 48'	Report	Lanzini 19'; Noble (yellow card) 21'; Ogbonna (yellow card) 62'; Cresswell (yellow card) 74' (yellow-red card) 75'; Kouyaté (yellow card) 90+4'	Stadium: Selhurst Park; Attendance: 25,643; Referee: Martin Atkinson

22 October 2016 9	Leicester City	3–1	Crystal Palace	Leicester
15:00 BST	Musa 42'; Okazaki 63'; Fuchs 80'	Report	Cabaye 85'	Stadium: King Power Stadium; Attendance: 31,969; Referee: Michael Oliver

29 October 2016 10	Crystal Palace	2–4	Liverpool	Selhurst
17:30 BST	McArthur 18', 33'; Cabaye (yellow card) 62'	Report	Can 16', (yellow card) 49'; Lovren 21'; Matip 44'; Firmino 71', (yellow card) 72'	Stadium: Selhurst Park; Attendance: 25,628; Referee: Andre Marriner

5 November 2016 11	Burnley	3–2	Crystal Palace	Burnley
15:00 GMT	Vokes 2'; Marney (yellow card) 10'; Guðmundsson 14'; Barnes 90+4'	Report	McArthur (yellow card) 59'; Wickham 60'; Delaney (yellow card) 78'; C. Benteke 81' (pen.)	Stadium: Turf Moor; Attendance: 19,196; Referee: Anthony Taylor

19 November 2016 12	Crystal Palace	1–2	Manchester City	Selhurst
15:00 GMT	Wickham 66', (yellow card) 78'	Report	Touré 39', 83'; Otamendi (yellow card) 56'; Nolito (yellow card) 62'	Stadium: Selhurst Park; Attendance: 25,529; Referee: Robert Madley

26 November 2016 13	Swansea City	5–4	Crystal Palace	Swansea
15:00 GMT	Routledge (yellow card) 22'; Cork (yellow card) 27'; Sigurðsson 36'; Fer 66', 68'; Naughton (yellow card) 72'; Fulton (yellow card) 86'; Llorente 90+1', 90+3'	Report	Zaha 19'; Hennessey (yellow card) 42'; Townsend (yellow card) 54'; Puncheon (yellow card) 67'; Kelly (yellow card) 68'; Tomkins 75'; Cork 82' (o.g.); C. Benteke 84'	Stadium: Liberty Stadium; Attendance: 20,276; Referee: Kevin Friend

3 December 2016 14	Crystal Palace	3–0	Southampton	Selhurst
15:00 GMT	C. Benteke 33', 85', (yellow card) 70'; Tomkins 36', (yellow card) 37'; McArthur (yellow card) 55'	Report	Austin (yellow card) 51'	Stadium: Selhurst Park; Attendance: 25,393; Referee: Neil Swarbrick

10 December 2016 15	Hull City	3–3	Crystal Palace	Kingston upon Hull
15:00 GMT	Snodgrass (yellow card) 20', (goal) 27' (pen.); Elmohamady (yellow card) 43'; Diomande 72'; Livermore 78'	Report	Dann (yellow card) 26'; McArthur (yellow card) 45+1'; Puncheon (yellow card) 46'; C. Benteke 52' (pen.); Zaha 70'; Cabaye (yellow card) 79'; Campbell 89'	Stadium: KCOM Stadium; Attendance: 17,403; Referee: Mike Jones

14 December 2016 16	Crystal Palace	1–2	Manchester United	Selhurst
20:00 GMT	Kelly (yellow card) 45+1'; McArthur 66'; Delaney (yellow card) 72'	Report	Rojo (yellow card) 38'; Pogba 45+2', (yellow card) 70'; Rashford (yellow card) 84'; Ibrahimović 88'	Stadium: Selhurst Park; Attendance: 25,547; Referee: Craig Pawson

17 December 2016 17	Crystal Palace	0–1	Chelsea	Selhurst
12:30 GMT	Ward (yellow card) 17'; Delaney (yellow card) 82'	Report	Costa (yellow card) 22', (goal) 43'; Kanté (yellow card) 60'; Fàbregas (yellow card) 90+2'	Stadium: Selhurst Park; Attendance: 25,259; Referee: Jonathan Moss

26 December 2016 18	Watford	1–1	Crystal Palace	Watford
12:30 GMT	Holebas (yellow card) 53'; Deeney 71' (pen.); Britos (yellow card) 90+1'	Report	Cabaye 26'; C. Benteke (penalty missed) 36' (yellow card) 45'; Puncheon (yellow card) 45+2'; Delaney (yellow card) 70'; Zaha (yellow card) 87'	Stadium: Vicarage Road; Attendance: 20,304; Referee: Mark Clattenburg

1 January 2017 19	Arsenal	2–0	Crystal Palace	Holloway
16:00 GMT	Giroud 17'; Iwobi 56'; Monreal (yellow card) 83'	Report	Tomkins (yellow card) 90'	Stadium: Emirates Stadium; Attendance: 59,975; Referee: Andre Marriner

3 January 2017 20	Crystal Palace	1–2	Swansea City	Selhurst
20:00 GMT	Kelly (yellow card) 77'; Zaha 83'; Tomkins (yellow card) 90+2'	Report	Llorente (yellow card) 15'; Mawson 42'; Rangel 88'	Stadium: Selhurst Park; Attendance: 24,913; Referee: Paul Tierney

14 January 2017 21	West Ham United	3–0	Crystal Palace	Stratford
15:00 GMT	Noble (yellow card) 34'; Carroll (yellow card) 42', (goal) 79'; Feghouli 68'; Byram (yellow card) 70'; Lanzini 86', (yellow card) 87'	Report	Ledley (yellow card) 38'; Ward (yellow card) 90+1'	Stadium: London Stadium; Attendance: 56,984; Referee: Neil Swarbrick

21 January 2017 22	Crystal Palace	0–1	Everton	Selhurst
15:00 GMT		Report	Holgate (yellow card) 26'; Coleman 87'	Stadium: Selhurst Park; Attendance: 25,594; Referee: Anthony Taylor

31 January 2017 23	AFC Bournemouth	0–2	Crystal Palace	Bournemouth
19:45 GMT		Report	Dann 46'; Ward (yellow card) 53'; Townsend (yellow card) 85'; Delaney (yellow card) 90'; C. Benteke 90+2', (yellow card) 90+3'	Stadium: Dean Court; Attendance: 11,286; Referee: Jonathan Moss

4 February 2017 24	Crystal Palace	0–4	Sunderland	Selhurst
15:00 GMT	Zaha (yellow card) 32'; Ward (yellow card) 66'; Puncheon (yellow card) 84'	Report	Larsson (yellow card) 6'; Koné 9'; Januzaj (yellow card) 31'; Ndong 43'; Defoe 45+1', 45+3'; Koné (yellow card) 71'	Stadium: Selhurst Park; Attendance: 25,310; Referee: Andre Marriner

11 February 2017 25	Stoke City	1–0	Crystal Palace	Stoke-on-Trent
15:00 GMT	Shawcross (yellow card) 53'; Allen 67'	Report	Delaney (yellow card) 16'; Zaha (yellow card) 40'; Puncheon (yellow card) 42'	Stadium: Bet365 Stadium; Attendance: 27,007; Referee: Martin Atkinson

25 February 2017 26	Crystal Palace	1–0	Middlesbrough	Selhurst
15:00 GMT	Cabaye (yellow card) 30'; Van Aanholt 34'; McArthur (yellow card) 76'; Ward (yellow card) 83'	Report	Fábio (yellow card) 75'	Stadium: Selhurst Park; Attendance: 24,300; Referee: Bobby Madley

4 March 2017 27	West Bromwich Albion	0–2	Crystal Palace	West Bromwich
15:00 GMT		Report	C. Benteke (yellow card) 45+1'; Zaha 55'; Townsend 84'	Stadium: The Hawthorns; Attendance: 24,051; Referee: Mike Jones

18 March 2017 28	Crystal Palace	1–0	Watford	Selhurst
15:00 GMT	Deeney 68' (o.g.)	Report	Cleverly (yellow card) 38'; Prödl (yellow card) 66'	Stadium: Selhurst Park; Attendance: 25,109; Referee: Martin Atkinson

1 April 2017 29	Chelsea	1–2	Crystal Palace	Fulham
15:00 BST	Fàbregas 5'; Costa (yellow card) 50'; Cahill (yellow card) 78'; David Luiz (yellow card) 83'	Report	Zaha 9'; C. Benteke 11' (yellow card) 69'; Milivojević (yellow card) 73'	Stadium: Stamford Bridge; Attendance: 41,489; Referee: Craig Pawson

5 April 2017 30	Southampton	3–1	Crystal Palace	Southampton
19:45 BST	Redmond 45'; Romeu (yellow card) 71'; Cédric (yellow card) 79'; Yoshida 84'; Ward-Prowse 85'	Report	C. Benteke 31' (yellow card) 88'	Stadium: St Mary's Stadium; Attendance: 29,968; Referee: Roger East

10 April 2017 31	Crystal Palace	3–0	Arsenal	Selhurst
20:00 BST	Townsend 17'; Cabaye 63'; Milivojević 68' (pen.)	Report	Mustafi (yellow card) 23'	Stadium: Selhurst Park; Attendance: 25,648; Referee: Michael Oliver

15 April 2017 32	Crystal Palace	2–2	Leicester City	Selhurst
15:00 BST	Cabaye 54'; C. Benteke 70'	Report	Huth 6'; Simpson (yellow card) 34'; Vardy 52'; King (yellow card) 63'	Stadium: Selhurst Park; Attendance: 25,504; Referee: Mike Dean

23 April 2017 33	Liverpool	1–2	Crystal Palace	Liverpool
16:30 BST	Coutinho 24'; Grujić (yellow card) 89'	Report	Benteke (yellow card) 40' (goal) 42', 74'; Milivojević (yellow card) 60'	Stadium: Anfield; Attendance: 53,086; Referee: Andre Marriner

26 April 2017 34	Crystal Palace	0–1	Tottenham Hotspur	Selhurst
20:00 BST	Ward (yellow card) 66'; Milivojević (yellow card) 79'; Zaha (yellow card) 90+6'	Report	Wanyama (yellow card) 26'; Walker (yellow card) 47'; Kane (yellow card) 60'; Eriksen 78'	Stadium: Selhurst Park; Attendance: 25,596; Referee: Jonathan Moss

29 April 2017 35	Crystal Palace	0–2	Burnley	Selhurst
17:30 BST	Benteke (yellow card) 43'; Zaha (yellow card) 50'	Report	Barnes 8'; Gray 85'	Stadium: Selhurst Park; Attendance: 25,013; Referee: Bobby Madley

6 May 2017 36	Manchester City	5–0	Crystal Palace	Manchester
12:30 BST	Silva 2'; Kompany (yellow card) 33' (goal) 49'; De Bruyne 60'; Sterling 82'; Otamendi 90+2'	Report	Kelly (yellow card) 4'; Milivojević (yellow card) 52'; Delaney (yellow card) 90+1'	Stadium: City of Manchester Stadium; Referee: Michael Oliver

14 May 2017 37	Crystal Palace	4–0	Hull City	Selhurst
12:00 BST	Zaha 3'; Benteke 34'; Cabaye (yellow card) 37'; Puncheon (yellow card) 41'; Milivojević 85' (pen.) van Aanholt 90' (yellow card) 90+1'	Report	Robertson (yellow card) 40'; N'Diaye (yellow card) 80'; Dawson (yellow card) 84'; Davies (yellow card) 87'; Clucas (yellow card) 90+3'	Stadium: Selhurst Park; Attendance: 25,176; Referee: Martin Atkinson

21 May 2017 38	Manchester United	2–0	Crystal Palace	Manchester
15:00 BST	Harrop 15'; Pogba 19'; McTominay (yellow card) 48'; Carrick (yellow card) 74'	Report		Stadium: Old Trafford; Referee: Anthony Taylor

=== FA Cup ===
Win Draw Loss

In the draw for the third round of the FA Cup on 5 December 2016, Palace were drawn away at League One team Bolton Wanderers.

7 January 2017 Third round	Bolton Wanderers	0–0	Crystal Palace	Bolton
15:00 GMT	Beevers (yellow card) 52'; Spearing (yellow card) 60'	Report		Stadium: Macron Stadium; Attendance: 11,683; Referee: Roger East

17 January 2017 Replay	Crystal Palace	2–1	Bolton Wanderers	Selhurst
20:00 GMT	Ledley (yellow card) 31'; C. Benteke 68', 77'	Report	Thorpe (yellow card) 37'; Henry 48'; Wilson (yellow card) 54'	Stadium: Selhurst Park; Attendance: 7,149; Referee: Stuart Attwell

28 January 2017 Fourth round	Crystal Palace	0–3	Manchester City	Selhurst
15:00 GMT	Mutch (yellow card) 30'; Kelly (yellow card) 54'; Ledley (yellow card) 90'	Report	Touré (yellow card) 28', (goal) 90+2'; Sterling (yellow card) 36', (goal) 43'; Sagna (yellow card) 56'; Sané 71'	Stadium: Selhurst Park; Attendance: 13,979; Referee: Mike Jones

=== EFL Cup ===
Win Draw Loss

23 August 2016 Second round	Crystal Palace	2–0	Blackpool	Selhurst
19:30 BST	Dann 25'; Wickham 47'	Report		Stadium: Selhurst Park; Attendance: 7533; Referee: Andrew Madley

20 September 2016 Third round	Southampton	2–0	Crystal Palace	Southampton
19:45 BST	Austin 33' (pen.); Hesketh 63'; Targett (yellow card) 80'	Report	Cabaye (yellow card) 85'	Stadium: St Mary's Stadium; Attendance: 14,080; Referee: James Adcock

=== Pre-season friendlies ===
On 19 May 2016, Crystal Palace announced that pre-season 2016 would include a tour of North America, with matches against Philadelphia Union, Cincinnati and Vancouver Whitecaps.

Win Draw Loss

14 July 2016 North America Tour	Philadelphia Union	0–0	Crystal Palace	Chester, Pennsylvania, United States
00:00 BST				Stadium: Talen Energy Stadium

17 July 2016 North America Tour	FC Cincinnati	0–2	Crystal Palace	Cincinnati, United States
01:00 BST		Report	Mutch 8'; Zaha 63'	Stadium: Nippert Stadium; Attendance: 35,061

20 July 2016 North America Tour	Vancouver Whitecaps	2–2	Crystal Palace	Vancouver, Canada
03:00 BST	Edgar 50'; Waston 78'	Report	Campbell 62', 66'	Stadium: BC Place

25 July 2016 Friendly	Colchester United	0–1	Crystal Palace	Colchester
19:00 BST		Report	Mutch 9'	Stadium: Colchester Community Stadium

27 July 2016 Friendly	AFC Wimbledon	2–3	Crystal Palace	Kingsmeadow
19:00 BST	Taylor 38'; Speroni 77' (o.g.)	Report	Wickham 28'; Bolasie 67'; Wynter 76'

30 July 2016 Friendly	Fulham	3–1	Crystal Palace	Fulham
15:00 BST	Cairney 35'; Smith 55'; Ayité 90+1'	Report	Anderson 78'	Stadium: Craven Cottage

2 August 2016 Friendly	Bromley	1–2	Crystal Palace	Bromley
19:00 BST	Ajakaiye 85'	Report	Kaikai 22', 30'	Stadium: Courage Stadium; Attendance: 3,646

6 August 2016 Friendly	Crystal Palace	3–1	Valencia	London
15:00 BST	Wickham 10', 35'; Jedinak (pen.)	Report	Domènech 82'	Stadium: Selhurst Park; Referee: Andre Marriner

== Transfers ==
=== Transfers in ===
Date	Position	Nationality	Name	From	Fee	Ref.
1 July 2016	GK	FRA	Steve Mandanda	Marseille	~£1,500,000	
1 July 2016	MF	ENG	Andros Townsend	Newcastle United	£13,000,000	
5 July 2016	DF	ENG	James Tomkins	West Ham United	£10,000,000	
20 August 2016	FW	BEL	Christian Benteke	Liverpool	~£27,000,000	
31 August 2016	FW	BEL	Jonathan Benteke	Zulte Waregem	Free transfer	
31 August 2016	MF	AFG	Noor Husin	Free agent	Free transfer	
31 August 2016	MF	ENG	Giovanni McGregor	Free agent	Free transfer	
8 September 2016	MF	FRA	Mathieu Flamini	Arsenal	Free transfer	
13 January 2017	DF	GHA	Jeffrey Schlupp	Leicester City	~£9,000,000	
30 January 2017	DF	NED	Patrick van Aanholt	Sunderland	~£10,000,000	
31 January 2017	MF	SRB	Luka Milivojević	Olympiacos	~£11,000,000	

=== Loans in ===
Date from	Position	Nationality	Name	From	Date until	Ref.
30 August 2016	FW	FRA	Loïc Rémy	Chelsea	End of season	
31 January 2017	DF	FRA	Mamadou Sakho	Liverpool	End of season	

=== Transfers out ===
Date from	Position	Nationality	Name	To	Fee	Ref.
30 June 2016	CF	TOG	Emmanuel Adebayor	Free agent	Released	
30 June 2016	FW	ENG	Reise Allassani	Free agent	Released	
30 June 2016	MF	NOR	Andreas Breimyr	Viking (Note: Following Breimyr's release he joined Viking.)	Released	
30 June 2016	FW	MAR	Marouane Chamakh	Cardiff City (Note: Following Chamakh's release he joined Cardiff City.)	Released	
30 June 2016	MF	ENG	Connor Dymond	Bromley (Note: Following Dymond's release he joined Bromley.)	Released	
30 June 2016	DF	NOR	Brede Hangeland	Retired	Released	
30 June 2016	MF	SCO	William Hoare	Free agent	Released	
30 June 2016	GK	SCO	Chris Kettings	Oldham Athletic (Note: Following Kettings' release he joined Oldham Athletic.)	Released	
30 June 2016	DF	JAM	Adrian Mariappa	Watford (Note: Following Mariappa's release he joined Watford.)	Released	
30 June 2016	DF	IRL	Paddy McCarthy	Free agent	Released	
30 June 2016	GK	ENG	Oliver Pain	Free agent	Released	
30 June 2016	DF	ENG	Christian Scales	Free agent	Released	
1 July 2016	FW	ENG	Dwight Gayle	Newcastle United	£10,000,000	
1 July 2016	GK	ENG	David Gregory	Cambridge United	Free transfer	
1 August 2016	CM	ENG	Jake Gray	Luton Town	Free transfer	
1 August 2016	GK	ENG	Alex McCarthy	Southampton	~£4,000,000	
2 August 2016	LB	ENG	Jerome Binnom-Williams	Peterborough United	Free transfer	
6 August 2016	DF	ENG	Matthew George	Lewes	Free transfer	
15 August 2016	LW	COD	Yannick Bolasie	Everton	~£25,000,000	
17 August 2016	DM	AUS	Mile Jedinak	Aston Villa	~£4,000,000	

=== Loans out ===
Date from	Position	Nationality	Name	To	Date until	Ref.
30 August 2016	FW	ENG	Freddie Ladapo	Oldham Athletic	2 January 2017	
31 August 2016	DF	ENG	Luke Croll	Exeter City	End of Season (Note: On 16 January 2017, Luke Croll's loan spell was extended until the end of the season.)	
31 August 2016	MF	WAL	Jonny Williams	Ipswich Town	End of Season	
31 August 2016	MF	ENG	Hiram Boateng	Bristol Rovers	29 December 2016	
31 August 2016	MF	ENG	Sullay Kaikai	Brentford	2 January 2017 (Note: On 2 January 2017, Sullay Kaikai was recalled from his loan spell at Brentford.)	
31 August 2016	DF	ENG	Ryan Inniss	Southend United	End of Season	
31 August 2016	FW	ENG	Keshi Anderson	Bolton Wanderers	16 January 2017 (Note: On 16 January 2017, Keshi Anderson's loan spell at Bolton Wanderers was terminated by mutual consent.)	
1 January 2017	MF	ENG	Hiram Boateng	Northampton Town	End of Season	
5 January 2017	FW	NGA	Freddie Ladapo	Shrewsbury Town	End of Season	
17 January 2017	FW	ENG	Keshi Anderson	Northampton Town	End of Season	
31 January 2017	MF	AFG	Noor Husin	Accrington Stanley	End of Season	
31 January 2017	MF	ENG	Jordon Mutch	Reading	End of Season	
8 March 2017	FW	GHA	Kwesi Appiah	Viking	End of Season	

=== Overall activity ===
Total spending:▼~£81,500,000

Total income:▲~£43,000,000

Net expenditure:▼~£38,500,000

== Player statistics ==
=== Appearances and goals ===
As of 21 May 2017

No.	Pos	Nat	Player	Total		Premier League		FA Cup		League Cup	
No.	Pos	Nat	Player	Apps	Goals	Apps	Goals	Apps	Goals	Apps	Goals
1	GK	(Argentina) ARG	Julián Speroni	2	0	0	0	2	0	0	0
2	DF	(England) ENG	Joel Ward	42	0	38	0	3	0	1	0
3	DF	(Netherlands) NED	Patrick van Aanholt	11	2	8+3	2	0	0	0	0
4	MF	(France) FRA	Mathieu Flamini	13	0	3+7	0	3	0	0	0
5	DF	(England) ENG	James Tomkins	27	3	23+1	3	1+1	0	1	0
6	DF	(England) ENG	Scott Dann	25	4	19+4	3	0	0	2	1
7	MF	(France) FRA	Yohan Cabaye	35	4	25+7	4	0+1	0	2	0
8	FW	(France) FRA	Loïc Rémy	10	0	1+4	0	2+1	0	2	0
9	FW	(England) ENG	Fraizer Campbell	13	1	0+12	1	1	0	0	0
10	MF	(England) ENG	Andros Townsend	40	3	30+6	3	2+1	0	1	0
11	MF	(Ivory Coast) CIV	Wilfried Zaha	37	7	34+1	7	0	0	1+1	0
12	DF	(France) FRA	Mamadou Sakho	8	0	8	0	0	0	0	0
13	GK	(Wales) WAL	Wayne Hennessey	31	0	29	0	1	0	1	0
14	MF	(South Korea) KOR	Lee Chung-yong	20	0	4+11	0	3	0	1+1	0
15	FW	(Belgium) BEL	Jonathan Benteke	1	0	0+1	0	0	0	0	0
16	MF	(Wales) WAL	Joe Ledley	21	1	13+5	1	3	0	0	0
17	FW	(Belgium) BEL	Christian Benteke	40	17	36	15	1+1	2	1+1	0
18	MF	(Scotland) SCO	James McArthur	31	5	24+5	5	0+1	0	1	0
19	DF	(England) ENG	Zeki Fryers	12	0	0+8	0	2+1	0	1	0
21	FW	(England) ENG	Connor Wickham	10	3	4+4	2	0	0	1+1	1
22	MF	(England) ENG	Jordon Mutch	8	0	0+4	0	2	0	2	0
23	DF	(Senegal) SEN	Pape Souaré	4	0	3	0	0	0	1	0
25	MF	(England) ENG	Sullay Kaikai	3	0	0+1	0	1+1	0	0	0
26	MF	(Mali) MLI	Bakary Sako	8	0	0+7	0	0	0	1	0
27	DF	(Republic of Ireland) IRL	Damien Delaney	33	0	21+9	0	2	0	1	0
28	MF	(Serbia) SRB	Luka Milivojević	14	2	14	2	0	0	0	0
30	GK	(France) FRA	Steve Mandanda	10	0	9	0	0	0	1	0
31	DF	(Ghana) GHA	Jeffrey Schlupp	16	0	11+4	0	1	0	0	0
34	DF	(England) ENG	Martin Kelly	34	0	25+4	0	3	0	1+1	0
42	MF	(England) ENG	Jason Puncheon	39	0	35+1	0	0+1	0	1+1	0
Players who left the club during the season:
10	MF	(Democratic Republic of the Congo) COD	Yannick Bolasie	1	0	0+1	0	0	0	0	0
15	MF	(Australia) AUS	Mile Jedinak	1	0	1	0	0	0	0	0

=== Goalscorers ===
As of 21 May 2017

No.	Pos.	Name	Premier League	FA Cup	League Cup	Total
17	FW	Christian Benteke	15	2	0	17
11	MF	Wilfried Zaha	7	0	0	7
18	MF	James McArthur	5	0	0	5
7	MF	Yohan Cabaye	4	0	0	4
6	DF	Scott Dann	3	0	1	4
5	DF	James Tomkins	3	0	0	3
10	MF	Andros Townsend	3	0	0	3
21	FW	Connor Wickham	2	0	1	3
3	DF	Patrick van Aanholt	2	0	0	2
28	MF	Luka Milivojević	2	0	0	2
16	MF	Joe Ledley	1	0	0	1
9	FW	Fraizer Campbell	1	0	0	1
		Own goal	2	0	0	2
Total			50	2	2	54

=== Disciplinary record ===
As of 21 May 2017

No.	Pos.	Name	Premier League		FA Cup		League Cup		Total	
No.	Pos.	Name	Yellow card	Red card	Yellow card	Red card	Yellow card	Red card	Yellow card	Red card
17	FW	Christian Benteke	10	0	0	0	0	0	10	0
42	MF	Jason Puncheon	9	0	0	0	0	0	9	0
11	MF	Wilfried Zaha	8	0	0	0	0	0	8	0
27	DF	Damien Delaney	8	0	0	0	0	0	8	0
7	MF	Yohan Cabaye	7	0	0	0	1	0	8	0
2	DF	Joel Ward	7	0	0	0	0	0	7	0
18	MF	James McArthur	5	0	0	0	0	0	5	0
34	DF	Martin Kelly	4	0	1	0	0	0	5	0
5	DF	James Tomkins	4	0	0	0	0	0	4	0
10	MF	Andros Townsend	4	0	0	0	0	0	4	0
28	MF	Luka Milivojević	4	0	0	0	0	0	4	0
16	MF	Joe Ledley	1	0	2	0	0	0	3	0
6	DF	Scott Dann	2	0	0	0	0	0	2	0
21	FW	Connor Wickham	1	0	0	0	0	0	1	0
13	GK	Wayne Hennessey	1	0	0	0	0	0	1	0
3	DF	Patrick van Aanholt	1	0	0	0	0	0	1	0
22	MF	Jordon Mutch	0	0	1	0	0	0	1	0
Players who left the club during the season:
10	MF	Yannick Bolasie	1	0	0	0	0	0	1	0
Total			77	0	4	0	1	0	82	0
