= Arron Fray =

English footballer

Personal information
- Full name: Arron Fray
- Date of birth: 1 May 1987 (age 39)
- Place of birth: Bromley, England
- Position: Defender

Team information
- Current team: Erith and Belvedere

Youth career
- 2003–2005: Crystal Palace

Senior career*
| Years | Team | Apps | (Gls) |
| 2005–2008 | Crystal Palace | 0 | (0) |
| 2008–2009 | Dagenham & Redbridge | 0 | (0) |
| 2009–2011 | Bromley | 5 | (0) |
| 2011–? | Thurrock | | |
- Erith and Belvedere
- Glebe
- * Club domestic league appearances and goals as of 18:47, 3 July 2020 (UTC)

Arron Fray (born 1 May 1987) is a footballer who plays as a defender for Glebe.

Fray was born in Bromley and came through the Crystal Palace academy, making a surprise debut for the club against Italian club Internazionale in July 2005, playing on the opposite side of defence to his natural position of right-back. During the 2005–06 season, he played two matches in the Football League Cup for Crystal Palace, against Walsall and Coventry City. Fray was released by Palace in 2008 without making a league appearance and he subsequently signed for Dagenham & Redbridge. Fray did not make a league appearance for them either, and was released in 2009. Fray then signed for non-league club Bromley. In 2011, Fray signed for Thurrock. He subsequently signed for Erith and Belvedere of the Southern Counties East Football League. As of June 2020 Fray was playing for Glebe in the Southern Counties East Football League.
