= Jim Cannon (footballer, born 1953) =

Scottish footballer

Personal information
- Full name: James Cannon
- Date of birth: 2 October 1953 (age 73)
- Place of birth: Glasgow, Scotland
- Height: 6 ft 0 in (1.83 m)
- Position: Centre back

Youth career
- 1970–1973: Crystal Palace

Senior career*
Years	Team	Apps	(Gls)
1973–1988	Crystal Palace	571	(30)

Managerial career
- 2003–2004: Chipstead
- * Club domestic league appearances and goals

James Cannon (born 2 October 1953) is a Scottish retired footballer.

== Career ==
Along with several other promising young Scottish players he was signed as an apprentice for Crystal Palace in October 1970, by then manager Bert Head, having previously had a trial with Manchester City. He made a goalscoring debut on 31 March 1973 against Chelsea and went on to make 660 appearances for the club, beating Terry Long's record in the 1984–85 season.

A centre half who could also play at left back or in midfield, he eventually left the club at the end of the 1987–88 season (15 seasons after his debut), having been captain for the previous ten seasons, and initially joined Croydon and then in November 1988, Dartford. He also had a short spell with Bristol Rovers before finishing his football career in 1994 after three seasons at Dulwich Hamlet. In retirement he owned a building company ICS Builders in the Croydon area, and managed Chipstead during the 2003–04 season.

In 2005, Cannon was voted into Palace's Centenary XI, and was only just pipped to "The Player of The Century" award by Ian Wright. At the start of 2005–06 season onwards, returned to Palace, in the hospitality department, hosting the executive boxes at Selhurst Park on matchdays.

== Controversy ==
Former teammate Ian Wright later said that Cannon was oppressive to teammates and had bullied him for two years (once Kung fu kicking him in the back), claims that Cannon has strenuously denied over a number of years. In 2017, Cannon would admit to giving Wright "a little slap", with Wright alleging was one of the reasons then-manager Steve Coppell got rid of the former at season end. Cannon would again comment on the claims of bullying in 2023, describing the allegations as "a load of crap" and the product of a "woke" society that has more restrictive perceptions of appropriate language. Wright has maintained that he was bullied by Cannon.
