= Jamie Smith (footballer, born 1974) =

English footballer and manager

Personal information
- Full name: James Jade Anthony Smith
- Date of birth: 17 September 1974 (age 52)
- Place of birth: Birmingham, England
- Height: 5 ft 6 in (1.68 m)
- Position: Right-back

Youth career
- 1990–1994: Wolverhampton Wanderers

Senior career*
Years	Team	Apps	(Gls)
1994–1997	Wolverhampton Wanderers	87	(0)
1997–2004	Crystal Palace	149	(4)
1999	→ Fulham (loan)	9	(1)
2004–2006	Bristol City	45	(2)
2006	→ Brentford (loan)	7	(0)
2006–2007	Milton Keynes Dons	17	(0)
2009–2010	Halesowen Town	21	(0)
2010–2011	Airbus UK	8	(2)
Total		343	(9)

International career
1996	England U21		

Managerial career
- 2025–2026: Port Vale (caretaker)
- * Club domestic league appearances and goals

James Jade Anthony Smith (born 17 September 1974) is an English football coach and former player who is the lead first-team coach at EFL League Two club Port Vale. A right-back in his 17-year playing career, he scored 13 goals in 398 league and cup appearances.

Smith began his career at Wolverhampton Wanderers, where he would play 104 games from his debut in August 1994 until he was traded to Crystal Palace in October 1997. He made 18 Premier League appearances for Palace, playing 174 games overall in seven years. He also spent the latter part of the 1998–99 season on loan at Fulham, helping the club to a Second Division title. He left Crystal Palace after struggling with injuries and signed with Bristol City in August 2004. He was loaned out to Brentford in March 2006 and joined Milton Keynes Dons on a free transfer in July 2006. He ended his playing career in the Football League in July 2007, though later had a spell in non-League football with Halesowen Town and Airbus UK.

He turned to coaching after ending his playing career, working as part of the backroom staff at West Bromwich Albion, Doncaster Rovers, Sheffield Wednesday and Huddersfield Town. He joined Port Vale in 2024 and became caretaker-manager in December 2025.

== Playing career ==
=== Wolverhampton Wanderers ===
Smith joined Wolverhampton Wanderers as a youth trainee at the age of 16, having turned down a YTS offer from Blackburn Rovers. He had been scouted by Ron Jukes playing Sunday league football for Feckenham in the Central Warwickshire League. He progressed through the academy ranks to make his first-team debut under the stewardship of Graham Taylor on 13 August 1994 in a 1–0 win over Reading at Molineux. He went on to make 25 First Division appearances in the 1994–95 season, earning the nickname "Jinky" from supporters. He made ten league starts in the 1995–96 campaign before he established himself as a key first-team member with 40 starts and three substitute appearances under manager Mark McGhee in the 1996–97 season. He also scored his first goal in senior football in the play-off semi-final first-leg defeat to Crystal Palace at Selhurst Park. Wolves won the return leg but were beaten 4–3 on aggregate. He signed a new two-year contract in June 1997, though was traded away after 16 appearances in the 1997–98 campaign.

=== Crystal Palace ===
On 21 October 1997, Smith was traded to Crystal Palace in a player-exchange deal for Dougie Freedman and Kevin Muscat (valued at a combined £1 million). Smith made his Palace debut as they won away 3–1 at Sheffield Wednesday, but got sent off in his second match against Aston Villa. He made 18 Premier League appearances by the end of the 1997–98 season, which saw Palace relegated in last place. He was a first-team regular under both Terry Venables and Steve Coppell in the 1998–99 season until the club entered administration. On 25 March 1999, he joined Fulham on loan until the end of the 1998–99 campaign, where manager Kevin Keegan was already familiar with him after coaching him in the England under-21 set-up three years previously. Keegan moved Steve Finnan out of the right-back spot to accommodate Smith at Craven Cottage. Having been coached by Graham Taylor at Wolves and Terry Venables earlier in the season at Palace, Keegan became the third England manager to coach Smith. Smith scored one goal in nine games, helping Fulham to win promotion as champions of the Second Division.

Smith was transfer-listed during the 2000–01 season by manager and namesake Alan Smith, alongside Clinton Morrison and Hayden Mullins. He underwent a knee operation in March 2001. He rejected an approach from Bolton Wanderers to instead sign a new three-year contract with Palace in June 2001, following extensive negotiations with chairman Simon Jordan. He struggled with a niggling ankle injury for much of the 2001–02 season. However, he remained in the first XI under both Steve Bruce and Trevor Francis. He returned to fitness in March 2003 after a year out injured. He featured twice for caretaker manager Steve Kember at the end of the 2002–03 season. He remained in the starting eleven for the following campaign. However, he was released by Crystal Palace at the end of the 2003–04 season after having featured only twice in the second half of the campaign under new manager Iain Dowie.

=== Bristol City ===
Smith signed with League One club Bristol City on 6 August 2004 following a trial spell. He made 43 appearances under Brian Tinnion in the 2004–05 campaign. On 15 March 2016, he joined league rivals Brentford on loan after being judged as surplus to requirements at Ashton Gate by manager Gary Johnson. He played nine games at Griffin Park, featuring in both legs of the play-off semi-final defeat to Swansea City.

=== Milton Keynes Dons ===
On 18 July 2006, Smith was signed by his former Brentford manager Martin Allen for League Two club Milton Keynes Dons. He was sidelined by a persistent knee injury during his spell at the National Hockey Stadium, however, and he was released by the club at the end of the 2006–07 season after 20 appearances. This led to him announcing his playing retirement in July 2007.

=== Later career ===
Smith came out of retirement to sign for Southern League Premier Division club Halesowen Town in 2009 and at the same time was working with Airbus UK – managed by former Crystal Palace teammate Craig Harrison – towards his coaching badges. He then moved to the Welsh Premier League side in January 2010 and registered as a player at The Airfield.

== Style of play ==
Smith was a hard-tackling full back who liked to get forward and attack, though was injury-prone.

== Coaching career ==
Smith joined West Bromwich Albion as a youth development officer and was promoted to under-18s coach in 2016. He was elevated to under-23s manager in 2018. Darren Moore named Smith as his assistant manager at Doncaster Rovers in July 2019. He would follow Moore to Sheffield Wednesday in March 2021, taking on the same role as assistant manager. Following Moore contracting COVID-19, Smith took charge of match days for the Championship games against Watford, Cardiff City and Queens Park Rangers. He would again lead the dugout after Moore suffered a setback in his recovery. The pair led Wednesday to promotion out of the League One play-offs in 2023. He left Sheffield Wednesday in June 2023, with manager Darren Moore and the rest of his backroom staff. In September 2023, he re-united with Moore once again as part of the new coaching staff at Championship side Huddersfield Town. Moore was sacked the following January, along with Smith and the rest of the coaching staff. Smith joined Moore at Port Vale as the Lead First Team Coach in February 2024. He became caretaker manager on 28 December 2025 after Moore departed with the club bottom of League One. His second game in charge was a 5–1 win over Blackpool on New Year's Day, where the team came from a goal down at half-time after Smith changed formation from 3–5–2 to 4–4–2 and made two substitutions. Jon Brady was appointed as head coach on 6 January 2026.

== Career statistics ==
=== Playing ===
Appearances and goals by club, season and competition
Club	Season	League			National cup (Note: Includes FA Cup, Welsh Cup)		League cup (Note: Includes Football League Cup, Welsh League Cup)		Other		Total	
Club	Season	Division	Apps	Goals	Apps	Goals	Apps	Goals	Apps	Goals	Apps	Goals
Wolverhampton Wanderers	1994–95	First Division	25	0	1	0	3	0	2 (Note: Appearance(s) in Anglo-Italian Cup)	0	31	0
Wolverhampton Wanderers	1995–96	First Division	13	0	0	0	1	0	—		14	0
Wolverhampton Wanderers	1996–97	First Division	38	0	1	0	2	0	2 (Note: Appearance(s) in play-offs)	1	43	1
Wolverhampton Wanderers	1997–98	First Division	11	0	0	0	5	0	—		16	0
Wolverhampton Wanderers	Total		87	0	2	0	11	0	4	1	104	1
Crystal Palace	1997–98	Premier League	18	0	4	0	0	0	—		22	0
Crystal Palace	1998–99	First Division	26	0	1	0	3	0	—		30	0
Crystal Palace	1999–2000	First Division	27	0	1	0	4	2	—		32	2
Crystal Palace	2000–01	First Division	29	0	1	0	6	0	—		36	0
Crystal Palace	2001–02	First Division	32	4	0	0	2	0	—		34	4
Crystal Palace	2002–03	First Division	2	0	0	0	0	0	—		2	0
Crystal Palace	2003–04	First Division	15	0	1	0	2	0	—		18	0
Crystal Palace	Total		149	4	8	0	17	2	0	0	174	6
Fulham (loan)	1998–99	Second Division	9	1	—		—		—		9	1
Bristol City	2004–05	League One	39	2	2	0	2	0	0	0	43	2
Bristol City	2005–06	League One	6	0	0	0	0	0	0	0	6	0
Bristol City	Total		45	2	2	0	2	0	0	0	49	2
Brentford (loan)	2005–06	League One	7	0	—		—		2	0	9	0
Milton Keynes Dons	2006–07	League Two	17	0	2	0	1	0	—		20	0
Halesowen Town	2009–10	Southern League; Premier Division	18	0	0	0	0	0	2 (Note: 1 appearance in Southern League Cup and 1 appearance in Worcestershire Senior Cup)	0	20	0
Halesowen Town	2010–11	Southern League; Premier Division	3	0	0	0	0	0	1 (Note: Appearance(s) in Worcestershire Senior Cup)	0	4	0
Halesowen Town	Total		21	0	0	0	0	0	3	0	24	0
Airbus UK	2009–10	Welsh Premier League	6	2	0	0	0	0	—		6	2
Airbus UK	2010–11	Welsh Premier League	2	0	0	0	1	0	—		3	0
Airbus UK	Total		8	2	0	0	1	0	0	0	9	2
Career total			343	9	14	0	32	2	9	1	398	12

=== Managerial ===
As of match played 1 January 2026

Managerial record by team and tenure
Team	From	To	Record					Ref.
Team	From	To	P	W	D	L	Win %	Ref.
Port Vale (caretaker)	28 December 2025	6 January 2026	2	1	0	1	50.00	
Total			2	1	0	1	50.00	

== Honours ==
Fulham

- Football League Second Division: 1998–99
