= 2002–03 Crystal Palace F.C. season =

English football club season

Crystal Palace
2002–03 season
- Chairman: Simon Jordan
- Manager: Trevor Francis (until 18 April); Steve Kember (caretaker from 18 April)
- Stadium: Selhurst Park
- First Division: 14th
- FA Cup: Fifth round
- League Cup: Fifth round
- Top goalscorer: League: Johnson (11); All: Johnson (14)
- Average home league attendance: 16,867
Home colours	Away colours

During the 2002–03 English football season, Crystal Palace competed in the Football League First Division.

== Season summary ==
Under Francis, Palace were unable to mount a serious promotion challenge and they finished mid-table in Division One. The main highlight of the season was in February 2003 when Palace knocked Liverpool out of the FA Cup in a fourth round replay at Anfield. Having drawn the first match 0–0 at Selhurst Park, Palace went to Anfield as the clear underdogs. A goal from Julian Gray and an own goal from Liverpool's Stephen Henchoz meant that Palace progressed to a 5th round where they played at home against Leeds United. They lost 2–1 in controversial circumstances, as Palace were denied a first half goal despite the ball clearly crossing the line. Francis resigned on 18 April after another difficult season, and was replaced by long-serving coach Steve Kember.

The end of Francis' tenure, however, saw the beginning of a remarkable, two-year-long transfer saga. Clinton Morrison, a youth team product who had been one of the team's most reliable goalscorers, headed to Birmingham for a £4 million fee in a part-exchange deal which saw Andrew Johnson come to Selhurst Park for £750,000, having been deemed surplus to requirements by Blues boss Steve Bruce. Johnson went on to become an even bigger success at Palace than Morrison, and helped take the club into the Premier League before eventually moving on to Everton for a fee of £8.6million in 2006; Morrison's return to Selhurst Park a year earlier cost Palace £2 million, meaning the club were left with the same player and a total profit of £9,850,000.

== Final league table ==
Pos	Team	Pld	W	D	L	GF	GA	GD	Pts
12	Preston North End	46	16	13	17	68	70	−2	61
13	Watford	46	17	9	20	54	70	−16	60
14	Crystal Palace	46	14	17	15	59	52	+7	59
15	Rotherham United	46	15	14	17	62	62	0	59
16	Burnley	46	15	10	21	65	89	−24	55

Updated to match(es) played on 11 May 2003. Source: Soccerway
Rules for classification: 1) points; 2) goal difference; 3) number of goals scored.

== Players ==
=== First-team squad ===
Squad at end of season

Note: Flags indicate national team as defined under FIFA eligibility rules; some limited exceptions apply. Players may hold more than one non-FIFA nationality.

No.	Pos.	Nation	Player
1	GK	ENG	Matt Clarke
2	DF	IRL	Curtis Fleming (Note: Fleming was born in Manchester, England, but also qualified to represent the Republic of Ireland internationally and made his international debut for the Republic of Ireland in April 1996.)
3	DF	ENG	Danny Granville
4	DF	ENG	Danny Butterfield
5	DF	WAL	Kit Symons (Note: Symons was born in Basingstoke, England, but also qualified to represent Wales internationally through his father and made his international debut for Wales in February 1992.)
6	DF	AUS	Tony Popovic
7	MF	ENG	Hayden Mullins
8	FW	ENG	Andy Johnson
9	FW	SCO	Dougie Freedman
10	MF	ENG	Shaun Derry
11	MF	ENG	Julian Gray
12	DF	ENG	Jamie Smith
13	GK	LVA	Aleksandrs Koliņko
14	MF	SCO	Steven Thomson
15	MF	FIN	Aki Riihilahti

No.	Pos.	Nation	Player
16	MF	ENG	Tommy Black
22	MF	ENG	Wayne Routledge
23	FW	WAL	Gareth Williams (Note: Williams was born in Johannesburg, South Africa, but also qualified to represent Wales internationally and represented them at U-21 level.)
24	DF	GHA	Will Antwi (Note: Antwi was born in Epsom, England, but also qualified to represent Ghana internationally and made his international debut for Ghana in 2003.)
26	MF	ENG	Ben Surey
27	DF	ENG	David Hunt
31	FW	NGA	Dele Adebola
32	DF	ENG	Darren Powell
33	GK	FRA	Cédric Berthelin
35	FW	ENG	Noel Whelan (on loan from Middlesbrough)
38	DF	ENG	Gary Borrowdale
42	MF	ENG	Ben Watson
43	DF	ENG	Sam Togwell
55	FW	NGA	Ade Akinbiyi (Note: Akinbiyi was born in Hackney, England, but also qualified to represent Nigeria internationally through his parents and made his international debut for Nigeria in 1999.)

=== Left club during season ===
Note: Flags indicate national team as defined under FIFA eligibility rules; some limited exceptions apply. Players may hold more than one non-FIFA nationality.

No.	Pos.	Nation	Player
17	FW	LVA	Andrejs Rubins (released)
18	DF	ENG	Dean Austin (to Woking)
20	FW	ENG	Steve Kabba (to Sheffield United)
21	DF	ENG	Andy Frampton (to Brentford)

No.	Pos.	Nation	Player
25	DF	USA	Gregg Berhalter (to Energie Cottbus)
25	GK	GER	Sven Scheuer (to Grazer AK)
33	GK	GRE	Nikolaos Michopoulos (on loan from Burnley)

== Reserve squad ==
Note: Flags indicate national team as defined under FIFA eligibility rules; some limited exceptions apply. Players may hold more than one non-FIFA nationality.

No.	Pos.	Nation	Player
19	DF	ENG	Craig Harrison
28	MF	ENG	Robert Smith

No.	Pos.	Nation	Player
29	MF	MRI	Gavin Heeroo (Note: Heeroo was born in Haringey, England, but also qualified to represent Mauritius internationally and made his international debut for Mauritius in 2002.)
30	GK	ENG	Lance Cronin
