= 2001–02 Crystal Palace F.C. season =

English football club season

Crystal Palace
2001–02 season
- Chairman: Simon Jordan
- Manager: Steve Bruce (until 2 November); Trevor Francis (from 30 November)
- Stadium: Selhurst Park
- First Division: 10th
- FA Cup: Third round
- Worthington Cup: Third round
- Top goalscorer: League: Morrison (22); All: Morrison (24)
- Average home league attendance: 17,177
Home colours	Away colours

During the 2001–02 English football season, Crystal Palace F.C. competed in the Football League First Division.

== Season summary ==
Palace turned to Steve Bruce for the 2001–02 season. A good start to the season gave Palace hope for a promotion challenge, but Bruce attempted to walk out on the club after just four months at the helm to take charge of Birmingham City. After a short spell on 'gardening leave', Bruce was eventually allowed to join Birmingham City, succeeded by Trevor Francis, who had ironically been his predecessor at Birmingham.

== Final league table ==
Pos	Team	Pld	W	D	L	GF	GA	GD	Pts
8	Preston North End	46	20	12	14	71	59	+12	72
9	Wimbledon	46	18	13	15	63	57	+6	67
10	Crystal Palace	46	20	6	20	70	62	+8	66
11	Coventry City	46	20	6	20	59	53	+6	66
12	Gillingham	46	18	10	18	64	67	−3	64

Rules for classification: 1) Points; 2) Goal difference; 3) Goals scored

== Results ==
Crystal Palace's score comes first

=== Legend ===
Win	Draw	Loss

=== Football League First Division ===
Date	Opponent	Venue	Result	Attendance	Scorers
11 August 2001	Rotherham United	A	3–2	6,994	Freedman (pen), Riihilahti, Smith
18 August 2001	Stockport County	H	4–1	15,760	Riihilahti, Morrison 2 (pen), Freedman
25 August 2001	Nottingham Forest	A	2–4	18,239	Freedman (2)
8 September 2001	Millwall	H	1–3	21,641	Morrison
15 September 2001	Portsmouth	A	2–4	18,149	Rodger, Freedman
18 September 2001	Grimsby Town	H	5–0	13,970	Kirovski, Popovic (2), Freedman, Morrison
22 September 2001	Barnsley	H	1–0	15,433	Riihilahti
25 September 2001	Sheffield United	A	3–1	14,180	Smith, Freedman (pen), Hopkin
29 September 2001	Sheffield Wednesday	H	4–1	17,066	Freedman (2), Morrison (2)
13 October 2001	Wimbledon	H	4–0	20,009	Morrison, Kirovski, Riihilahti, Brown (own goal)
16 October 2001	Bradford City	H	2–0	15,721	Morrison (2)
20 October 2001	Wolverhampton Wanderers	A	1–0	26,471	Kirovski
23 October 2001	Burnley	A	0–1	14,713	
28 October 2001	Norwich City	H	3–2	19,553	Morrison (2), Freedman
31 October 2001	West Bromwich Albion	H	0–1	17,273	
3 November 2001	Walsall	A	2–2	6,795	Hopkin, Freedman
17 November 2001	Crewe Alexandra	H	4–1	21,802	Walton (own goal), Morrison, Kirovski, Freedman
21 November 2001	Gillingham	A	0–3	9,396	
24 November 2001	Preston North End	A	1–2	15,264	Freedman
28 November 2001	Coventry City	A	0–2	13,695	
1 December 2001	Burnley	H	1–2	18,457	Morrison
8 December 2001	Manchester City	H	2–1	22,080	Freedman, Kirovski
11 December 2001	Birmingham City	A	0–1	20,119	
15 December 2001	Watford	A	0–1	16,499	
20 December 2001	Nottingham Forest	H	1–1	15,645	Morrison
26 December 2001	Millwall	A	0–3	16,630	
29 December 2001	Bradford City	A	2–1	14,233	Berhalter, Benjamin
13 January 2002	Stockport County	A	1–0	5,541	Freedman
16 January 2002	Gillingham	H	3–1	17,646	Morrison (2), Freedman
19 January 2002	Rotherham United	H	2–0	17,311	Morrison, Smith
29 January 2002	Coventry City	H	1–3	16,197	Freedman
2 February 2002	Sheffield Wednesday	A	3–1	20,099	Morrison, Freedman, Smith
7 February 2002	Wolverhampton Wanderers	H	0–2	18,475	
16 February 2002	Wimbledon	A	1–1	13,564	Morrison
23 February 2002	Sheffield United	H	0–1	18,009	
26 February 2002	Barnsley	A	4–1	11,207	Freedman, Riihilahti, Akinbiyi, Gray
2 March 2002	Grimsby Town	A	2–5	5,924	Gray, Morrison
5 March 2002	Portsmouth	H	0–0	15,915	
9 March 2002	Watford	H	0–2	16,817	
16 March 2002	Manchester City	A	0–1	33,637	
23 March 2002	Walsall	H	2–0	21,038	Morrison, Freedman (pen)
30 March 2002	Norwich City	A	1–2	21,251	Morrison
1 April 2002	Birmingham City	H	0–0	19,598	
7 April 2002	Crewe Alexandra	A	0–0	6,724	
13 April 2002	Preston North End	H	2–0	21,361	Hopkin, Akinbiyi
21 April 2002	West Bromwich Albion	A	0–2	26,712	

=== FA Cup ===
Round	Date	Opponent	Venue	Result	Attendance	Goalscorers
R3	5 January 2002	Newcastle United	A	0–2	38,089	

=== League Cup ===
Round	Date	Opponent	Venue	Result	Attendance	Goalscorers
R1	21 August 2001	Leyton Orient	A	4–2	4,290	Morrison (2), Black (2)
R2	12 September 2001	Everton	A	1–1 (won 5–4 on pens)	21,128	Freedman (pen)
R3	10 October 2001	Sheffield Wednesday	A	2–2 (lost 1–3 on pens)	8,796	Rodger, Riihilahti

== Players ==
=== First-team squad ===
Squad at end of season

Note: Flags indicate national team as defined under FIFA eligibility rules; some limited exceptions apply. Players may hold more than one non-FIFA nationality.

No.	Pos.	Nation	Player
1	GK	LVA	Aleksandrs Koliņko
2	DF	ENG	Jamie Smith
3	DF	ENG	Craig Harrison
4	DF	ENG	Dean Austin
6	MF	SCO	David Hopkin
7	MF	ENG	Hayden Mullins
8	MF	ENG	Simon Rodger
9	FW	SCO	Dougie Freedman
10	FW	IRL	Clinton Morrison (Note: Morrison was born in Wandsworth, England, but also qualified to represent the Republic of Ireland internationally through his grandmother and made his international debut for the Republic of Ireland in August 2001.)
11	MF	ENG	Tommy Black
12	DF	USA	Gregg Berhalter
13	GK	ENG	Lance Cronin
14	MF	SCO	Steven Thomson
15	MF	FIN	Aki Riihilahti
16	DF	ENG	Andy Frampton
17	FW	LVA	Andrejs Rubins
20	FW	ENG	Richard Harris

No.	Pos.	Nation	Player
21	GK	FRA	Cédric Carrasso
24	MF	ENG	Julian Gray
25	MF	USA	Jovan Kirovski
27	FW	ENG	Steve Kabba
28	DF	AUS	Tony Popovic
30	DF	ENG	Danny Granville
31	GK	ENG	Matt Clarke
32	MF	ENG	Jamie Pollock
33	DF	ENG	Scott Gooding
34	MF	ENG	Robert Kember
35	DF	ENG	Ryan Williams
36	DF	WAL	Kit Symons (Note: Fleming was born in Basingstoke, England, but also qualified to represent Wales internationally through his father and made his international debut for Wales in February 1992.)
38	DF	IRL	Curtis Fleming (Note: Fleming was born in Manchester, England, but also qualified to represent the Republic of Ireland internationally and made his international debut for the Republic of Ireland in April 1996.)
39	FW	WAL	Gareth Williams
40	MF	ENG	Wayne Routledge
55	FW	NGA	Ade Akinbiyi (Note: Akinbiyi was born in Hackney, England, but also qualified to represent Nigeria internationally through his parents and made his international debut for Nigeria in 1999.)

=== Left club during season ===
Note: Flags indicate national team as defined under FIFA eligibility rules; some limited exceptions apply. Players may hold more than one non-FIFA nationality.

No.	Pos.	Nation	Player
5	MF	CHN	Fan Zhiyi (to Dundee)
5	DF	WAL	Christian Edwards (on loan from Nottingham Forest)
18	MF	NIR	Wayne Carlisle (to Bristol Rovers)
19	DF	ENG	David Woozley (to Torquay United)
21	GK	ENG	Matthew Gregg (released)
22	FW	WAL	Andy Martin (to Torquay United)
23	MF	WAL	Stephen Evans (to Brentford)
26	MF	ENG	Sean Hankin (to Torquay United)

No.	Pos.	Nation	Player
26	FW	ENG	Trevor Benjamin (Note: Benjamin was born in Kettering, England, and represented them at U-21 level, but also qualified to represent Jamaica internationally and would make his international debut for Jamaica in November 2002.) (on loan from Leicester City)
26	DF	AUS	Shaun Murphy (on loan from Sheffield United)
29	MF	ENG	Jon Boardman (to Woking)
30	FW	ENG	Chris Sharpling (to Woking)
36	DF	ENG	Steve Vickers (on loan from Middlesbrough)
37	DF	ENG	Richard Howell (to Stevenage Borough)
41	GK	ENG	Gary Hateley (to Weston-Super-Mare)

=== Reserve squad ===
Note: Flags indicate national team as defined under FIFA eligibility rules; some limited exceptions apply. Players may hold more than one non-FIFA nationality.

No.	Pos.	Nation	Player
—	GK	ENG	Fraser Digby
—	DF	ENG	Gareth Gwillim

No.	Pos.	Nation	Player
—	MF	ENG	Steve Warren
