= 1999–2000 Crystal Palace F.C. season =

English football club season

Crystal Palace
1999–2000 season
- Chairman: Peter Morley
- Manager: Steve Coppell
- Stadium: Selhurst Park
- First Division: 15th
- FA Cup: Third round
- League Cup: Second round
- Top goalscorer: League: Morrison (12); All: Morrison (14)
- Highest home attendance: 22,577 vs. Charlton Athletic (25 March 2000)
- Lowest home attendance: 12,110 vs. Norwich City (23 November 1999)
- Average home league attendance: 15,662
Home colours	Away colours	Third colours

During the 1999–2000 English football season, Crystal Palace F.C. competed in the Football League First Division.

== Season summary ==
Crystal Palace finished in a secure 15th final place. At the end of the season, veteran defender Andy Linighan was voted the club's player of the season.

== Final league table ==
Pos	Team	Pld	W	D	L	GF	GA	GD	Pts
13	Tranmere Rovers	46	15	12	19	57	68	−11	57
14	Nottingham Forest	46	14	14	18	53	55	−2	56
15	Crystal Palace	46	13	15	18	57	67	−10	54
16	Sheffield United	46	13	15	18	59	71	−12	54
17	Stockport County	46	13	15	18	55	67	−12	54

Rules for classification: 1) Points; 2) Goal difference; 3) Goals scored

== Results ==
Crystal Palace's score comes first

=== Legend ===
Win	Draw	Loss

=== Football League First Division ===
Date	Opponent	Venue	Result	Attendance	Scorers
7 August 1999	Crewe Alexandra	H	1–1	13,664	Rodger
14 August 1999	Barnsley	A	3–2	14,461	Rodger, Austin, Bradbury
21 August 1999	Swindon Town	H	1–2	12,726	Morrison
28 August 1999	Huddersfield Town	A	1–7	10,656	Linighan
4 September 1999	Sheffield United	A	1–3	11,886	Morrison
11 September 1999	Manchester City	A	1–2	31,541	Morrison
18 September 1999	Grimsby Town	H	3–0	13,294	Morrison, Mullins, Svensson
25 September 1999	West Bromwich Albion	A	0–0	13,219	
28 September 1999	Wolverhampton Wanderers	H	1–1	12,720	Bradbury
2 October 1999	Portsmouth	H	4–0	15,221	Svensson, Carlisle, Fan, Mullins
16 October 1999	Birmingham City	A	0–2	21,582	
20 October 1999	Blackburn Rovers	A	1–1	15,819	Mullins
23 October 1999	Tranmere Rovers	H	2–2	18,645	Svensson, Austin
26 October 1999	West Bromwich Albion	H	0–2	12,203	
30 October 1999	Portsmouth	A	1–3	13,018	Linighan
6 November 1999	Bolton Wanderers	A	0–2	12,744	
14 November 1999	Queens Park Rangers	H	3–0	15,861	McKenzie, Svensson, Mullins (pen)
20 November 1999	Port Vale	A	2–2	5,170	McKenzie, Svensson
23 November 1999	Norwich City	H	1–0	12,110	Svensson
27 November 1999	Nottingham Forest	H	2–0	15,920	McKenzie, Svensson
4 December 1999	Crewe Alexandra	A	0–2	4,923	
7 December 1999	Ipswich Town	H	2–2	13,176	Svensson, Mowbray (own goal)
18 December 1999	Fulham	H	0–0	17,480	
26 December 1999	Charlton Athletic	A	1–2	20,043	Martin
28 December 1999	Walsall	H	3–2	13,943	Svensson (pen), Carlisle, Mullins
3 January 2000	Stockport County	A	2–1	8,570	Mullins, Carlisle
15 January 2000	Barnsley	H	0–2	14,225	
21 January 2000	Swindon Town	A	4–2	5,214	Morrison (2), Foster, Mullins (pen)
29 January 2000	Huddersfield Town	H	2–2	14,290	Mullins, Linighan
5 February 2000	Wolverhampton Wanderers	A	1–2	20,756	Martin
12 February 2000	Sheffield United	H	1–1	14,877	Morrison
19 February 2000	Nottingham Forest	A	0–2	16,421	
26 February 2000	Grimsby Town	A	0–1	5,421	
4 March 2000	Manchester City	H	1–1	21,052	Morrison
7 March 2000	Bolton Wanderers	H	0–0	15,236	
11 March 2000	Norwich City	A	1–0	15,064	Morrison
18 March 2000	Port Vale	H	1–1	18,954	Rougier (own goal)
22 March 2000	Queens Park Rangers	A	1–0	12,842	Morrison
25 March 2000	Charlton Athletic	H	0–1	22,577	
1 April 2000	Fulham	A	0–1	16,356	
8 April 2000	Stockport County	H	3–3	16,646	McKenzie, Forssell (2)
15 April 2000	Walsall	A	2–2	6,323	Forssell, Mullins
22 April 2000	Birmingham City	H	0–2	17,144	
25 April 2000	Ipswich Town	A	0–1	18,798	
29 April 2000	Blackburn Rovers	H	2–1	18,272	Cole, Morrison
7 May 2000	Tranmere Rovers	A	2–1	8,891	Mullins, Morrison

=== FA Cup ===
Round	Date	Opponent	Venue	Result	Attendance	Goalscorers
R3	10 December 1999	Cambridge United	A	0–2	5,631	

=== League Cup ===
Round	Date	Opponent	Venue	Result	Attendance	Goalscorers
R1 1st Leg	10 August 1999	Colchester United	A	2–2	4,242	Smith, Rizzo
R1 2nd Leg	24 August 1999	Colchester United	H	3–1 (won 5–3 on agg)	5,471	Smith, Morrison, Rizzo
R2 1st Leg	14 September 1999	Leicester City	H	3–3	5,006	Morrison, Fan, Mullins
R2 2nd Leg	22 September 1999	Leicester City	A	2–4 (lost 5–7 on agg)	12,762	Thomson, Bradbury

== Players ==
=== First-team squad ===
Squad at end of season

Note: Flags indicate national team as defined under FIFA eligibility rules; some limited exceptions apply. Players may hold more than one non-FIFA nationality.

No.	Pos.	Nation	Player
2	DF	ENG	Jamie Smith
3	DF	ENG	Andy Frampton
4	DF	ENG	Dean Austin
6	DF	ENG	David Woozley
7	DF	ENG	Hayden Mullins
8	MF	CHN	Fan Zhiyi
9	FW	FIN	Mikael Forssell (on loan from Chelsea)
10	FW	IRL	Clinton Morrison (Note: Morrison was born in Wandsworth, England, but also qualified to represent the Republic of Ireland internationally through his grandmother and would make his international debut for the Republic of Ireland in August 2001.)
11	MF	AUS	Nicky Rizzo
12	MF	SCO	Jamie Fullarton
13	GK	ENG	Fraser Digby
14	MF	SCO	Steven Thomson
15	MF	AUS	Craig Foster
16	DF	ENG	Ashley Cole (on loan from Arsenal)
17	DF	ENG	Andy Linighan

No.	Pos.	Nation	Player
18	DF	NIR	Wayne Carlisle
19	FW	ENG	Leon McKenzie
20	FW	ENG	Richard Harris
21	GK	ENG	Matt Gregg
22	FW	WAL	Andy Martin
23	MF	WAL	Stephen Evans
24	DF	ENG	Jimmy Hibburt
26	MF	IRL	Stephen Hunt
27	MF	ENG	Sean Hankin
28	FW	ENG	Steve Kabba
29	FW	ENG	Roscoe Dsane
30	MF	ENG	Jon Boardman
31	MF	ENG	Simon Rodger
32	GK	WAL	Lee Kendall
33	FW	ENG	Chris Sharpling

=== Left club during season ===
Note: Flags indicate national team as defined under FIFA eligibility rules; some limited exceptions apply. Players may hold more than one non-FIFA nationality.

No.	Pos.	Nation	Player
1	GK	ENG	Kevin Miller (to Barnsley)
5	DF	ENG	Dave Tuttle (to Barnsley)
9	FW	ENG	Lee Bradbury (to Portsmouth)
16	FW	SWE	Mathias Svensson (to Charlton Athletic)
25	MF	NIR	Gareth Graham (to Brentford)
25	GK	AUS	Steve Mautone (to Gillingham)

No.	Pos.	Nation	Player
34	DF	BRA	Fumaça (on loan from Catuense Futebol)
34	MF	VEN	Fernando de Ornelas (to Real Zaragoza)
35	DF	IRL	Terry Phelan (Note: Phelan was born in Manchester, England, but also qualified to represent the Republic of Ireland internationally and made his international debut for the Republic of Ireland in 1991.) (on loan from Everton)
36	DF	ENG	David Lee (to Exeter City)
37	MF	IRL	Brian Launders (to Sheffield United)
