= Football League First Division Player of the Month =

English football award

The Football League First Division Player of the Month award was a monthly prize of recognition given to association football players in the Football League First Division, the second tier of English football from 1992 to 2004. The award was announced in the first week of the following month. From the 2004–05 season onwards, following a rebranding exercise by The Football League, the second tier was known as the Football League Championship, thus the award became the Football League Championship Player of the Month award.

== List of winners ==
Month	Year (Note: Each year in the table is linked to the corresponding football season.)	Nationality	Player	Team	Ref
December	2000	Ireland	Clinton Morrison	Crystal Palace	
August	2003	Scotland	Dougie Freedman	Crystal Palace	
September	2003	England	Darren Huckerby	Norwich City	
October	2003	Ireland	Andy Reid	Nottingham Forest	
November	2003	Wales	Jason Koumas	West Bromwich Albion	
December	2003	Jamaica	Ricardo Fuller	Preston North End	
January	2004	England	Andrew Johnson	Crystal Palace	
February	2004	England	Nathan Ellington	Wigan Athletic	
April	2004	England	Andrew Johnson	Crystal Palace	

For results from 2004–05 onwards, see EFL Championship Player of the Month.
