= Hayden Mullins =

English footballer and manager (born 1979)

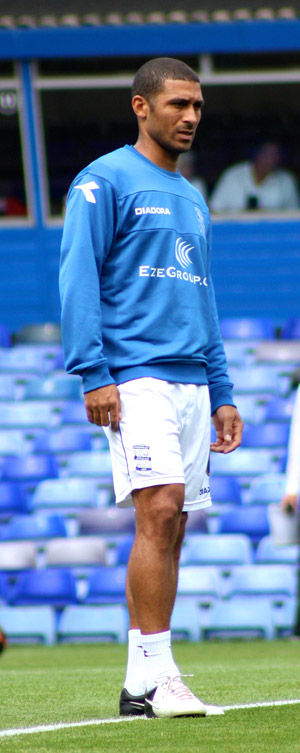
- Mullins with Birmingham City during pre-season in 2012

Personal information
- Full name: Hayden Ian Mullins
- Date of birth: 27 March 1979 (age 47)
- Place of birth: Reading, England
- Height: 6 ft 0 in (1.83 m)
- Position: Defensive midfielder

Team information
- Current team: Newport County (manager)

Youth career
- 1996–1998: Crystal Palace

Senior career*
Years	Team	Apps	(Gls)
1998–2003	Crystal Palace	222	(18)
2003	→ West Ham United (loan)	1	(0)
2003–2009	West Ham United	179	(4)
2009–2012	Portsmouth	114	(3)
2012	→ Reading (loan)	7	(0)
2012–2014	Birmingham City	36	(2)
2014	→ Notts County (loan)	16	(1)
2014–2015	Notts County	32	(0)
Total		607	(28)

International career
1999	England U21	3	(0)

Managerial career
- 2019: Watford (caretaker)
- 2020: Watford (caretaker)
- 2021–2022: Colchester United
- 2023: Turks and Caicos Islands
- 2026–: Newport County
- * Club domestic league appearances and goals

Hayden Ian Mullins (born 27 March 1979) is an English football manager footballer and former player. He is currently manager of EFL League Two club Newport County. He played primarily as a defensive midfielder, but he also played as a sweeper and at right-back.

Mullins began his career with First Division side Crystal Palace in 1996, and signed his first professional contract with the club in 1998. He quickly established himself in the first team, and made 257 senior appearances for Palace in five seasons. In October 2003, he switched to First Division side West Ham United, initially on a short-term loan, which quickly turned into a permanent transfer. He remained at the club for five and a half years, making 213 appearances, before joining Premier League side Portsmouth in January 2009. He made 129 appearances for Portsmouth, but the club's financial difficulties meant that he joined Championship side Reading on loan in March 2012. At the end of the 2011–12 season, Mullins left Portsmouth, and joined Birmingham City on a free transfer. After two years, during which he also spent time on loan at Notts County, Birmingham confirmed he would be released when his contract expired at the end of the 2013–14 season.

Mullins made three appearances for the England under-21 squad in 1999. After retiring, he became under-23 manager of Watford in 2016, and was twice their interim manager.

== Playing career ==
=== Crystal Palace ===
Mullins was born in Reading, Berkshire. He joined Crystal Palace as a trainee in August 1996, and made his first-team debut in July 1998, at the age of 19, in the 1998 UEFA Intertoto Cup matches against Turkish club Samsunspor. Head coach Terry Venables gave him his domestic debut in a 3–3 draw against Bolton Wanderers in August 1998, and he scored his first senior goal in a 3–1 away defeat to Birmingham City a week later. He immediately established himself in the first team, made 45 league and cup appearances in the 1998–99 season, was named Player of The Year, and was capped for the England under-18 team. Mullins later acknowledged his debt to Venables, saying, "I learnt a lot from him. He took a lot of time with us on the training pitch. He taught us a lot about shape and formation, he's very detailed in that respect. He's very good man on man, he made me feel totally comfortable he didn't pressure me into it at all."

Financial difficulties meant that Crystal Palace were unable to make new signings for the 1999–2000 season and relied on youngsters such as Mullins and Clinton Morrison and veterans such as Andy Linighan as they successfully battled against relegation from the First Division. Mullins made 49 league and cup appearances in that season and a further 51 appearances in the 2000–01 season as Palace reached the semi-final of the League Cup, but narrowly escaped relegation. He was transfer listed in October 2000, due to what manager Alan Smith described as a "bad attitude", but was taken off the list and was offered and signed a new four-year contract two months later as his relationship with Smith improved. Smith said of him in January 2001, "He's a really good footballer which means I can play him in any position. I like my young players to play in different positions. This season he's played full-back, midfield and sweeper. [We've] got to work on his defending, but he's got pace, he has good vision and he wants to play football."

Mullins made a total of 47 appearances in league and cup in the 2001–02 season as Palace made an ultimately unsuccessful push for the First Division play-off places. He was made captain in the 2002–03 season by manager Trevor Francis, who saw him as an integral part of the squad. He made 52 league and cup appearances as Palace advanced to the quarter-final of the League Cup, as well as recording a memorable 2–0 win over Liverpool in an FA Cup fourth round replay at Anfield. He was named Player of The Year for a second time in 2003.

An offer of £600,000 from Birmingham City in January 2003 was rejected as "derisory". With one year remaining on his existing contract, Mullins turned down the offer of a new contract in May. His agent said, "It is no secret that Hayden believes he will not be able to fulfil his true potential at Palace. If the club wishes to get some financial reward for their role in his up bringing, then they need to sell him this summer." The following October, he joined West Ham United. Mullins made over 250 league and cup appearances for Palace, scoring 20 goals.

=== West Ham United ===
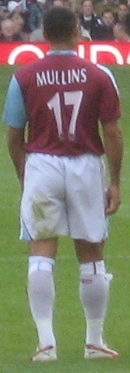
Mullins playing for West Ham United in November 2006

Mullins was the first signing for West Ham's newly appointed manager, Alan Pardew, and initially joined on a short-term loan to enable him to play against Nottingham Forest on the same day. The deal was made permanent a day later for a fee of £600,000, rising to £800,000 should West Ham be promoted. Pardew said of him, "...I have captured a player that I feel is going to add significantly to us. [He] can play in various positions and give us cover in a number of those [...] I think ultimately he is a central midfield player for us and I think his energy will be important; he will have to battle in the midfield. He is someone we are going to look to when we are up against it, to win the battle and give the room to [other players] to play. He is very much a destroyer and I think we are desperate for one of those."

Mullins made 34 league and cup appearances in his first season for West Ham, helping them to the First Division play-off final in May 2004, where they were beaten by a single goal to nil by Mullins' former club Crystal Palace. The following season, Mullins made 45 league and cup appearances as West Ham again reached the play-off final, this time beating Preston North End 1–0 to win promotion to the Premier League.

West Ham exceeded expectations in the 2005–06 season, finishing in a mid-table position and reaching the FA Cup final, which was won by Liverpool 3–1 on penalties. Mullins, having made 42 appearances in that season, was suspended for the final along with Liverpool's Luis García, after the pair had been sent off in a league fixture a few weeks earlier and an appeal against his dismissal was rejected by the Football Association. Pardew said, "I feel very aggrieved and very upset because Hayden has had a fantastic season. He has been one of our best players. He was my first signing here, I'm very proud of him, of what he has done and achieved."

At the beginning of the 2006–07 season, West Ham completed the signing of Argentine international Javier Mascherano who, like Mullins, was a defensive midfielder. However, after a brief period on the bench, Mullins re-established himself in the first team and scored the winning goal, in a 2–1 home win over Blackburn Rovers in October 2006, which put an end to the worst run of results for West Ham in 74 years.

Mullins made 32 league and cup appearances in the 2006–07 season as West Ham narrowly escaped relegation. On 1 November 2008, he scored his first league goal of the season in a 1–1 draw against Middlesbrough at the Riverside Stadium. It was his first league goal for two years.

Mullins made a total of 213 appearances for West Ham United, netting seven goals.

=== Portsmouth ===
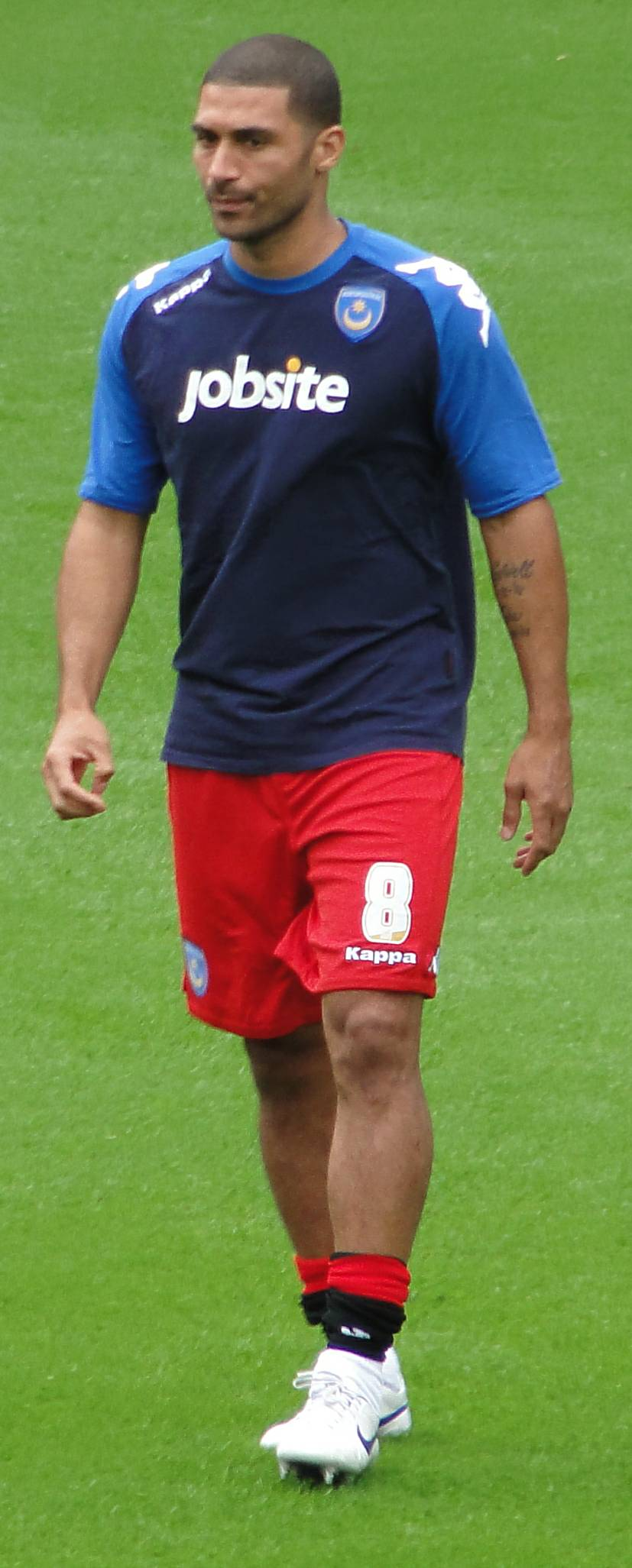
Mullins in Portsmouth colours in 2011

On 25 January 2009, Mullins joined Portsmouth on a three-and-a-half-year contract. He started the 2010 FA Cup final in an unfamiliar left-back role as Portsmouth were narrowly beaten 1–0 by Chelsea.

Portsmouth were relegated at the end of the season, but Mullins stayed at the Fratton Park side and took number 8 for the 2010–11 season after captain Marc Wilson was given number 6. He scored his first goal for the club in a 3–1 win over Bristol City on 28 September 2010. He was voted Portsmouth Player of the Season for the 2010–11 season.

==== Loan to Reading ====
On 15 March 2012, Mullins signed for Reading on loan for the 2011–12 season. He made seven appearances for Reading as they were promoted to the Premier League.

=== Birmingham City and loan to Notts County ===
On 12 July 2012, Mullins signed for Birmingham City on a two-year contract on a free transfer. He made his debut in the League Cup first round against Barnet, and kept his place for the opening match of the 2012–13 season, a 1–1 draw at home to Charlton Athletic. He scored his first goal for Birmingham in a 2–2 draw with Nottingham Forest on 15 September.

On 31 January 2014, Mullins joined Notts County on loan until the end of the 2013–14 season. He made his debut the next day as a second-half substitute as County lost 2–0 away to Preston North End. With one match of County's season remaining, Mullins was recalled by Birmingham to cover for the injured Tom Thorpe. Playing at centre back, he made a crucial clearance in the final game, away at Bolton Wanderers, that contributed to Birmingham City retaining their Championship status via Paul Caddis' stoppage-time equaliser. Birmingham confirmed he would be released when his contract expired at the end of the 2013–14 season. He finished his Birmingham career having scored twice in 39 appearances in all competitions.

=== Notts County ===
On 5 June 2014, Mullins rejoined Notts County on a one-year contract.

== International career ==
Mullins made three appearances for the England under-21 team in 1999, against Poland in March, Hungary in April and Bulgaria in June.

== Coaching career ==
After retiring as a player, Mullins joined Reading in a role that saw him oversee the development of the club's players who were out on loan. In July 2016, he joined Watford as assistant to under-21 coach Harry Kewell, later progressing to management of the under-23 team. In December 2019, Mullins was named as temporary manager of Watford after Quique Sánchez Flores was sacked. He managed two games as interim manager; a 2–0 away defeat by Leicester City and a goalless draw at home to Crystal Palace. Mullins took charge against Crystal Palace while newly appointed manager, Nigel Pearson watched from the stands.

In July 2020, he was again placed in temporary charge following the dismissal of manager Pearson. His first game in charge following Pearson's dismissal resulted in a 0–4 defeat to Manchester City. This result, coupled with Aston Villa's win later the same day, dropped Watford into 18th place in the league and a relegation position. Watford were relegated to the Championship on the last day of the season following a 3–2 defeat by Arsenal. On 1 September 2020 he left the club.

On 3 September 2020, Mullins was announced as assistant head coach to Steve Ball at Colchester United. In February 2021, Ball was replaced by Wayne Brown as first team coach. After a run of poor results, Brown was in-turn replaced by Mullins on 31 March 2021. On 13 May 2021, Mullins was appointed head coach of Colchester on a permanent basis. On 19 January 2022, Mullins was sacked as head coach after a run of poor results.

He coached the Turks and Caicos Islands national football team in March 2023.

On 26 July 2023, Mullins was unveiled as the new U21 Head Coach at Fulham. On 16 May 2024, he led Fulham U21s to the Premier League Cup, defeating Tottenham Hotspur U21s 4–0 in the final.

On 31 July 2026, Mullins was appointed manager of EFL League Two club Newport County.

== Career statistics ==
Appearances and goals by club, season and competition
Club	Season	League			FA Cup		League Cup		Other		Total	
Club	Season	Division	Apps	Goals	Apps	Goals	Apps	Goals	Apps	Goals	Apps	Goals
Crystal Palace	1998–99	First Division	40	5	1	0	4	0	2 (Note: Appearances in UEFA Intertoto Cup)	0	47	5
Crystal Palace	1999–2000	First Division	45	10	1	0	3	1	—		49	11
Crystal Palace	2000–01	First Division	41	1	2	0	8	0	—		51	1
Crystal Palace	2001–02	First Division	43	0	1	0	3	0	—		47	0
Crystal Palace	2002–03	First Division	43	2	4	0	5	1	—		52	3
Crystal Palace	2003–04	First Division	10	0	—		1	0	—		11	0
Crystal Palace	Total		222	18	9	0	24	2	2	0	257	20
West Ham United	2003–04	First Division	27	0	4	1	—		3 (Note: Appearances in Football League First Division play-offs)	0	34	1
West Ham United	2004–05	Championship	37	1	3	0	2	0	3 (Note: Appearances in Football League Championship play-offs)	0	45	1
West Ham United	2005–06	Premier League	35	0	6	1	1	0	—		42	1
West Ham United	2006–07	Premier League	30	2	1	1	1	0	0	0	32	3
West Ham United	2007–08	Premier League	34	0	1	0	4	0	—		39	0
West Ham United	2008–09	Premier League	17	1	2	0	2	0	—		21	1
West Ham United	Total		180	4	17	3	10	0	6	0	213	7
Portsmouth	2008–09	Premier League	17	0	—		—		—		17	0
Portsmouth	2009–10	Premier League	18	0	6	0	3	0	—		27	0
Portsmouth	2010–11	Championship	45	2	1	0	3	0	—		49	2
Portsmouth	2011–12	Championship	34	1	1	0	1	0	—		36	1
Portsmouth	Total		114	3	8	0	7	0	0	0	129	3
Reading (loan)	2011–12	Championship	7	0	—		—		—		7	0
Birmingham City	2012–13	Championship	28	2	0	0	2	0	—		30	2
Birmingham City	2013–14	Championship	8	0	1	0	0	0	—		9	0
Birmingham City	Total		36	2	1	0	2	0	—		39	2
Notts County (loan)	2013–14	League One	16	1	—		—		—		16	1
Notts County	2014–15	League One	32	0	1	0	1	0	1 (Note: Appearances in the Football League Trophy)	0	35	0
Notts County	Total		48	1	1	0	1	0	1	0	51	1
Career total			607	28	36	3	44	2	9	0	696	33

== Managerial statistics ==
As of match played 21 November 2026

Managerial record by team and tenure
Team	From	To	Record					Ref.
Team	From	To	P	W	D	L	Win %	Ref.
Watford (caretaker)	2 December 2019	7 December 2019	2	0	1	1	0.0	
Watford (caretaker)	19 July 2020	26 July 2020	2	0	0	2	0.0	
Colchester United	31 March 2021	19 January 2022	40	11	11	18	27.5	
Newport County	31 July 2026	present	21	7	9	5	33.3	
Total			65	18	21	26	27.7	—

== Honours ==
=== As a player ===
West Ham United

- Football League Championship play-offs: 2005

Portsmouth

- FA Cup runner-up: 2009–10

=== As a coach ===
Fulham U21

- Premier League Cup: 2023–24
