= 1998–99 Fulham F.C. season =

Fulham F.C.
1998–99 season
- Chairman: Mohammed Al Fayed
- Manager: Kevin Keegan (until 9 May); Paul Bracewell (from 18 May)
- Second Division: 1st
- FA Cup: Fifth round
- Worthington Cup: Third round
- Auto Windscreens Shield Trophy: Second round
- Top goalscorer: League: Geoff Horsfield (15); All: Geoff Horsfield (17)

The 1998–99 season was Fulham's 101st season in professional football. They played in the Second Division (previously known as the Third Division), achieving promotion to the First Division as champions, with a massive 14-point gap on Second place. The club also reached the fifth round of the FA Cup, where they were beaten by eventual winners Manchester United.

On 17 February 1999, Kevin Keegan was appointed England coach on a part-time basis following the departure of Glenn Hoddle. Keegan then left Craven Cottage at the end of the season to concentrate on his duties as England manager. Fulham replaced Keegan with Paul Bracewell as player-manager.

== Players ==
=== First-team squad ===
Note: Flags indicate national team as defined under FIFA eligibility rules; some limited exceptions apply. Players may hold more than one non-FIFA nationality.

No.	Pos.	Nation	Player
—	GK	GER	Maik Taylor (Note: Taylor was born in Hildesheim, West Germany, but qualified to represent any of the home nations internationally as he holds a British passport, and made his international debut for Northern Ireland in 1999.)
—	GK	ENG	Simon Brown (on loan from Tottenham Hotspur)
—	GK	RSA	Andre Arendse
—	DF	BEL	Philippe Albert (on loan from Newcastle United)
—	DF	ENG	Rufus Brevett
—	DF	WAL	Chris Coleman
—	DF	IRL	Steve Finnan
—	DF	FRA	François Keller
—	DF	ENG	Matt Lawrence
—	DF	SCO	Steve McAnespie
—	DF	ENG	Simon Morgan
—	DF	WAL	Alan Neilson (Note: Neilson was born in Wegberg, West Germany, but also qualified to represent Wales internationally and made his international debut for Wales in February 1992.)
—	DF	ENG	Rob Scott
—	DF	ENG	Jamie Smith (on loan from Crystal Palace)
—	DF	WAL	Kit Symons (Note: Symons was born in Basingstoke, England, but also qualified to represent Wales internationally through his father and made his international debut for Wales in February 1992.)
—	DF	SUR	Gus Uhlenbeek
—	MF	ENG	Kevin Betsy (Note: Betsy was born in Woking, England, but also qualified to represent Seychelles internationally and would make his international debut for Seychelles in June 2011.)

No.	Pos.	Nation	Player
—	MF	ENG	Paul Bracewell
—	MF	ENG	Matt Brazier
—	MF	ENG	Paul Brooker
—	MF	ENG	Wayne Collins
—	MF	ENG	Sean Davis
—	MF	ENG	Steve Hayward
—	MF	ENG	John Salako (Note: Salako was born in Ibadan, Nigeria, but also qualified to represent England internationally and made his international debut for England in 1991.)
—	MF	ENG	Neil Smith
—	MF	WAL	Paul Trollope (Note: Trollope was born in Swindon, England, but also qualified to represent Wales internationally and made his international debut for Wales in May 1997.)
—	FW	ENG	Peter Beardsley
—	FW	ENG	Luke Cornwall
—	FW	ENG	Barry Hayles (Note: Hayles was born in Lambeth, England, but also qualified to represent Jamaica internationally and made his international debut for Jamaica in June 2001, having previously represented the Cayman Islands internationally despite being ineligible to do so.)
—	FW	ENG	Geoff Horsfield
—	FW	GER	Dirk Lehmann
—	FW	ENG	Paul Moody
—	FW	CAN	Paul Peschisolido

== Final league table ==
Pos	Team	Pld	W	D	L	GF	GA	GD	Pts	Qualification or relegation
1	Fulham (C, P)	46	31	8	7	79	32	+47	101	Promotion to the First Division
2	Walsall (P)	46	26	9	11	63	47	+16	87	Promotion to the First Division
3	Manchester City (O, P)	46	22	16	8	69	33	+36	82	Qualification for the Second Division play-offs
4	Gillingham	46	22	14	10	75	44	+31	80	Qualification for the Second Division play-offs
5	Preston North End	46	22	13	11	78	50	+28	79	Qualification for the Second Division play-offs

Rules for classification: 1) Points; 2) Goals scored; 3) Goal difference
(C) Champions; (O) Play-off winners; (P) Promoted

== Results ==
=== Division 2 ===
8 August 1998 1	Macclesfield Town	0–1	Fulham	Macclesfield
			Salako 19'	Stadium: Moss Rose; Attendance: 3933

14 August 1998 2	Fulham	3–0	Manchester City	London
	Beardsley 21'; Lehmann 33' 39'			Stadium: Craven Cottage; Attendance: 14,284

22 August 1998 3	Colchester United	0–1	Fulham	Colchester
			Collins 82'	Stadium: Layer Road; Attendance: 6377

29 August 1998 4	Fulham	0–0	Bournemouth	London
				Stadium: Craven Cottage; Attendance: 12,107

31 August 1998 5	Oldham Athletic	1–1	Fulham	Oldham
	Allott 61'		Moody 50'	Stadium: Boundary Park; Attendance: 4744

8 September 1998 6	Fulham	1–0	Stoke City	London
	Brevett 60'			Stadium: Craven Cottage; Attendance: 12,055

12 September 1998 7	Notts County	1–0	Fulham	Nottingham
	Hendon 56'			Stadium: Meadow Lane; Attendance: 5805

19 September 1998 8	Fulham	3–3	York City	London
	Cornwall 19'; Coleman 32'; Symons 56'		Agnew 29' 85'; Tolson 49'	Stadium: Craven Cottage; Attendance: 9071

26 September 1998 9	Lincoln City	1–2	Fulham	Lincoln
	Whitney 56'		Beardsley 47' 64'	Stadium: Sincil Bank; Attendance: 4731

29 August 1998 10	Fulham	2–0	Wycombe Wanderers	London
	Coleman 13'; Bracewell 65'			Stadium: Craven Cottage; Attendance: 7447

3 October 1998 11	Fulham	1–3	Luton Town	London
	Neilson 87'		Gray 5'; Douglas 48'; S. Davis 65'	Stadium: Craven Cottage; Attendance: 11,856

17 October 1998 12	Millwall	0–1	Fulham	London
			Symons 89'	Stadium: The New Den; Attendance: 11,876

24 October 1998 13	Fulham	4–1	Walsall	London
	Peschisolido 30'; Symons 63'; Hayward 75'; Horsfield 83'		Marsh 71'	Stadium: Craven Cottage; Attendance: 8452

31 October 1998 14	Blackpool	2–3	Fulham	Blackpool
	Hills 30'; Aldridge 62'		Morgan 24'; Hayward 26' (pen.); Horsfield 35'	Stadium: Bloomfield Road; Attendance: 5904

7 November 1998 15	Fulham	1–0	Bristol Rovers	London
	Collins 38'			Stadium: Craven Cottage; Attendance: 11,575

10 November 1998 16	Wrexham	0–2	Fulham	Wrexham
			Uhlenbeek 14'; Peschisolido 30'	Stadium: Racecourse Ground; Attendance: 3485

21 November 1998 17	Fulham	2–1	Chesterfield	London
	Peschisolido 16' 54' (pen.)		Howard 62'	Stadium: Craven Cottage; Attendance: 10,005

28 November 1998 18	Gillingham	1–0	Fulham	Gillingham
	Taylor 90'			Stadium: Priestfield; Attendance: 7614

1 December 1998 19	Wigan Athletic	2–0	Fulham	Wigan
	McGibbon 51'; Lowe 62'			Stadium: Springfield Park; Attendance: 3951

12 December 1998 20	Fulham	4–0	Burnley	London
	Morgan 27' 38'; Hayles 57'; Peschisolido 73'			Stadium: Craven Cottage; Attendance: 9983

19 December 1998 21	Preston North End	0–1	Fulham	Preston
			Coleman 86'	Stadium: Deepdale; Attendance: 12,321

26 December 1998 22	Fulham	2–0	Colchester United	London
	N. Smith 26'; Hayles 73' (pen.)			Stadium: Craven Cottage; Attendance: 11,939

28 December 1998 23	Northampton Town	1–1	Fulham	Northampton
	Freestone 68'		Horsfield 49'	Stadium: Sixfields Stadium; Attendance: 7315

9 January 1999 24	Fulham	1–0	Macclesfield Town	London
	Horsfield 55'			Stadium: Craven Cottage; Attendance: 10,153

16 January 1999 25	Manchester City	3–0	Fulham	Manchester
	Goater 24'; Taylor 32'; Horlock 54'			Stadium: Maine Road; Attendance: 30,251

26 January 1999 26	Fulham	1–0	Oldham Athletic	London
	Morgan 22'			Stadium: Craven Cottage; Attendance: 8160

30 January 1999 27	Fulham	2–0	Northampton Town	London
	Hayles 18'; Albert 70'			Stadium: Craven Cottage; Attendance: 11,641

6 February 1999 28	Wycombe Wanderers	1–1	Fulham	High Wycombe
	Baird 25'		Symons 33'	Stadium: Adams Park; Attendance: 7538

20 February 1999 29	Fulham	2–1	Notts County	London
	Horsfield 36' 67'		Owers 83'	Stadium: Craven Cottage; Attendance: 11,909

23 February 1999 30	Fulham	3–1	Reading	London
	Horsfield 49' 51'; Symons 67'		Brebner 3'	Stadium: Craven Cottage; Attendance: 11,247

27 February 1999 31	York City	0–3	Fulham	York
			Horsfield 40'; Hayles 45'; Peschisolido 52'	Stadium: Bootham Crescent; Attendance: 6169

2 March 1999 32	Bournemouth	1–1	Fulham	Bournemouth
	Vincent 72'		Symons 61'	Stadium: Dean Court; Attendance: 9928

6 March 1999 33	Fulham	1–0	Lincoln City	London
	Horsfield 44'			Stadium: Craven Cottage; Attendance: 11,702

9 March 1999 34	Luton Town	0–4	Fulham	Luton
			Horsfield 34' 73'; Trollope 64'; Hayles 85'	Stadium: Kenilworth Road; Attendance: 7424

12 March 1999 35	Bristol Rovers	2–3	Fulham	Bristol
	Thomson 45'; Roberts 47'		Symons 9'; Horsfield 38'; Trollope 56'	Stadium: Memorial Stadium; Attendance: 8011

16 March 1999 36	Stoke City	0–1	Fulham	Stoke-on-Trent
			Symons 10'	Stadium: Britannia Stadium; Attendance: 12,298

20 March 1999 37	Fulham	4–0	Blackpool	London
	Hayles 20'; Horsfield 63'; Finnan 74'; Symons 87'			Stadium: Craven Cottage; Attendance: 12,869

5 April 1999 38	Reading	0–1	Fulham	Reading
			Morgan 77'	Stadium: Madejski Stadium; Attendance: 18,741

10 April 1999 39	Fulham	2–0	Wigan Athletic	London
	Albert 56'; Symons 64'			Stadium: Craven Cottage; Attendance: 12,140

13 April 1999 40	Fulham	3–0	Gillingham	London
	Hayles 22'; Coleman 81'; Horsfield 88'			Stadium: Craven Cottage; Attendance: 13,119

17 April 1999 41	Chesterfield	1–0	Fulham	Chesterfield
	Hewitt 77'			Stadium: Saltergate; Attendance: 5800

21 April 1999 42	Fulham	4–1	Millwall	London
	Betsy 19'; Hayles 44'; Symons 48'; Finnan 89'		Shaw 75'	Stadium: Craven Cottage; Attendance: 11,266

24 April 1999 43	Fulham	1–1	Wrexham	London
	Peschisolido 43'		Connolly 18' (pen.)	Stadium: Craven Cottage; Attendance: 11,754

1 May 1999 44	Burnley	1–0	Fulham	Burnley
	Jepson 82'			Stadium: Turf Moor; Attendance: 13,086

4 May 1999 45	Walsall	2–2	Fulham	Walsall
	Steiner 40'; Roper 70'		J. Smith 45'; Hayward 88'	Stadium: Bescot Stadium; Attendance: 8326

8 May 1999	Fulham	3–0	Preston North End	London
	Moody 64' 74' (pen.) 77'			Stadium: Craven Cottage; Attendance: 17,176

=== Worthington Cup ===
11 August 1998 R1, 1st leg	Fulham	2–1	Cardiff City	London
	Beardsley 43'; Lehmann 58'		Williams 8'	Stadium: Craven Cottage; Attendance: 4305

18 August 1998 R1, 2nd leg	Cardiff City	1–2	Fulham	Cardiff
	Eckhardt 86'		Salako 22'; Morgan 37'	Stadium: Ninian Park; Attendance: 4768

15 September 1998 R2, 1st leg	Fulham	1–1	Southampton	London
	Coleman 54'		Beattie 62'	Stadium: Craven Cottage; Attendance: 10,222

23 September 1998 R2, 2nd leg	Southampton	0–1	Fulham	Southampton
			Lehmann 10'	Stadium: The Dell; Attendance: 11,645

27 October 1998 R3	Liverpool	3–1	Fulham	Liverpool
	Morgan 53' (o.g.); Fowler 66' (pen.); Ince 76'		Peschisolido 60'	Stadium: Anfield; Attendance: 22,296

=== FA Cup ===
15 November 1998 R1	Fulham	1–1	Leigh RMI	London
	Lehmann 36'		Whealing 20'	Stadium: Craven Cottage; Attendance: 7965

24 November 1998 R1, replay	Leigh RMI	0–2	Fulham	Leigh
			Peschisolido 32' (pen.) 41'	Stadium: Hilton Park; Attendance: 7125

5 December 1998 R2	Fulham	4–2	Hartlepool United	London
	Horsfield 6' 84'; Di Lella 47' (o.g.); Morgan 81'		Midgley 41'; Howard 58'	Stadium: Craven Cottage; Attendance: 6358

2 January 1999 R3	Southampton	1–1	Fulham	Southampton
	Ostenstad 89'		Hayward 9'	Stadium: The Dell; Attendance: 12,549

13 January 1999 R3, replay	Fulham	1–0	Southampton	London
	Hayles 85'			Stadium: Craven Cottage; Attendance: 17,448

23 January 1999 R4	Aston Villa	0–2	Fulham	Birmingham
			Morgan 8'; Hayward 43'	Stadium: Villa Park; Attendance: 35,260

14 February 1999 R5	Manchester United	1–0	Fulham	Manchester
	Cole 26'			Stadium: Old Trafford; Attendance: 54,798

=== Auto Windscreens Shield Trophy ===
5 January 1999 R1	Torquay United	2–1 (a.e.t.)	Fulham	Torquay
	Partridge 88'; Lee 107'		Trollope 47'	Stadium: Plainmoor; Attendance: 2596
