= 2004–05 Bristol City F.C. season =

Bristol City
2004–05 season
- Chairman: Steve Lansdown
- Manager: Brian Tinnion
- Stadium: Ashton Gate
- League One: 7th
- FA Cup: First round
- League Cup: Second round
- Football League Trophy: Southern Area Quarter-Final
- Top goalscorer: League: Leroy Lita (24); All: Leroy Lita (29)

The 2004–05 season was Bristol City Football Club's 107th season in English football, and their sixth consecutive season in the third tier, now known as League One. It was Brian Tinnion's first season in charge of the club, and final season as a player. The club were pre-season favourites for promotion, but the side were inconsistent throughout the season and ended up in 7th place

The club's leading goalscorer was Leroy Lita, with 29 goals in all competitions.

== League table ==
Pos	Team	Pld	W	D	L	GF	GA	GD	Pts	Promotion or relegation
5	Sheffield Wednesday (O, P)	46	19	15	12	77	59	+18	72	Qualification for League One play-offs
6	Hartlepool United	46	21	8	17	76	66	+10	71	Qualification for League One play-offs
7	Bristol City	46	18	16	12	74	57	+17	70	
8	Bournemouth	46	20	10	16	77	64	+13	70	
9	Huddersfield Town	46	20	10	16	74	65	+9	70	

Updated to match(es) played on May 2005. Source: Soccerbase
Rules for classification: 1) points; 2) goal difference; 3) number of goals scored.
(O) Play-off winners; (P) Promoted

== Results ==
Bristol City's score comes first

=== Legend ===
Win	Draw	Loss

=== Football League Second Division ===
Date	Opponent	Venue	Result	Attendance	Scorers
7 August 2004	Torquay United	H	1–1	14,275	Lita
10 August 2004	Barnsley	A	1–2	10,435	Lita
14 August 2004	AFC Bournemouth	A	2–2	6,918	Lita, Smith
21 August 2004	Swindon Town	H	1–2	13,389	Doherty
28 August 2004	Port Vale	A	0–3	5,377	
30 August 2004	Brentford	H	4–1	10,296	Wilkshire (2), Murray (2)
4 September 2004	Peterborough United	A	1–0	4,227	Lita
11 September 2004	Stockport County	H	5–0	10,811	Lita (2), Tinnion, Roberts, Heffernan
18 September 2004	Bradford City	A	1–4	7,235	Murray
25 September 2004	Huddersfield Town	H	3–3	10,783	Murray, Lita (pen), Wilkshire
2 October 2004	Chesterfield	H	2–2	4,854	Murray, Coles
16 October 2004	Hull City	H	3–1	12,011	Brooker, Wilkshire, Butler
19 October 2004	Oldham Athletic	A	0–0	5,090	
23 October 2004	Walsall	A	2–1	7,105	Lita (2)
30 October 2004	Colchester United	H	0–0	11,678	
6 November 2004	Milton Keynes Dons	H	4–1	10,717	Lita (2), Brooker, Wilkshire
9 November 2004	Tranmere Rovers	H	4–0	11,098	Brooker (2), Wilkshire (2)
20 November 2004	Wrexham	A	3–1	7,833	Bell, Murray, Brooker
27 November 2004	Sheffield Wednesday	H	1–4	14,852	Murray
7 December 2004	Doncaster Rovers	A	1–1	5,608	Brooker
11 December 2004	Blackpool	A	1–1	5,220	Wilkshire
18 December 2004	Luton Town	H	1–2	13,414	Lita
26 December 2004	Stockport County	A	2–1	5,071	Butler, Heffernan
28 December 2004	Hartlepool United	H	0–0	13,034	
1 January 2005	Peterborough United	H	2–0	10,873	Brooker, Heffernan
3 January 2005	Huddersfield Town	A	2–2	11,151	Lita, Own goal
10 January 2005	Tranmere Rovers	A	1–0	8,183	Lita
15 January 2005	Bradford City	H	0–0	11,605	
22 January 2005	Hartlepool United	A	1–2	5,399	Brooker
28 January 2005	Chesterfield	H	2–3	10,103	Brooker, Smith
5 February 2005	Hull City	A	1–1	17,637	Lita
11 February 2005	Walsall	H	0–1	10,820	
19 February 2005	Colchester United	A	2–0	3,412	Brooker, Lita
22 February 2005	Oldham Athletic	H	5–1	9,007	Lita (2), Wilkshire, Brooker, Own goal
26 February 2005	Blackpool	H	1–1	10,977	Brooker
5 March 2005	Luton Town	A	0–5	8,330	
12 March 2005	Barnsley	H	0–0	9,321	
19 March 2005	Torquay United	A	4–0	4,299	Lita (3), Heffernan
2 April 2005	Port Vale	H	2–0	10,284	Lita, Heffernan
5 April 2005	AFC Bournemouth	H	0–2	12,008	
9 April 2005	Brentford	A	0–1	6,780	
13 April 2005	Swindon Town	A	0–0	6,977	
16 April 2005	Wrexham	H	1–0	8,267	Murray
23 April 2005	Milton Keynes Dons	A	2–1	5,656	Lita (2)
30 April 2005	Doncaster Rovers	H	2–2	12,375	Brooker (2)
7 May 2005	Sheffield Wednesday	A	3–2	28,798	Brooker (2), Wilkshire (pen)

=== FA Cup ===
Round	Date	Opponent	Venue	Result	Attendance	Goalscorers
R1	12 November 2004	Brentford	H	1–1	7,547	Lita
R1 Replay	25 November 2004	Brentford	A	1–1 (Lost 4–3 on Penalties)	3,706	Heffernan

=== League Cup ===
Round	Date	Opponent	Venue	Result	Attendance	Goalscorers
R1	24 August 2004	Wycombe Wanderers	A	1–0	1,778	Lita
R2	22 September 2004	Everton	H	2–2 (Lost 4–3 on Penalties)	15,264	Own goal, Lita

=== Football League Trophy ===
Round	Date	Opponent	Venue	Result	Attendance	Goalscorers
Southern Section R1	29 September 2004	Peterborough United	H	1–0	3,092	Heffernan
Southern Section R2	2 November 2004	Milton Keynes Dons	H	2–1	3,367	Lita (2)
Southern Section Quarter-Final	30 November 2004	Swindon Town	A	0–1	7,571	
