= 1998–99 Crystal Palace F.C. season =

English football club season

Crystal Palace
1998–99 season
- Chairman: Mark Goldberg
- Manager: Terry Venables (until 15 January); Steve Coppell (from 15 January)
- Stadium: Selhurst Park
- Football League First Division: 14th
- FA Cup: Third round
- Worthington Cup: Second round
- Top goalscorer: League: Morrison (12); All: Morrison (13)
- Average home league attendance: 17,123
Home colours	Away colours	Third colours

During the 1998–99 English football season, Crystal Palace F.C. competed in the Football League First Division.

== Season summary ==
Terry Venables was appointed head coach, but the dream of success for the 1998–99 season quickly turned into a nightmare. Goldberg was unable to sustain his financial backing of the club and they went into administration in March 1999. Simon Paterson took charge of the club throughout a spell in which it's very future seemed in serious doubt.

Venables stood down as manager and after some negotiation over his outstanding contract, left the club. In January 1999, Steve Coppell returned to the job once again, and was able to guide Palace to a mid-table finish. With the approval of the administrators, Peter Morley was installed as chairman, in time for the start of the next season.

== Final league table ==
Pos	Team	Pld	W	D	L	GF	GA	GD	Pts
12	West Bromwich Albion	46	16	11	19	69	76	−7	59
13	Barnsley	46	14	17	15	59	56	+3	59
14	Crystal Palace	46	14	16	16	58	71	−13	58
15	Tranmere Rovers	46	12	20	14	63	61	+2	56
16	Stockport County	46	12	17	17	49	60	−11	53

Rules for classification: 1) Points; 2) Goals scored; 3) Goal difference

== Results ==
Crystal Palace's score comes first

=== Legend ===
Win	Draw	Loss

=== Football League First Division ===
Date	Opponent	Venue	Result	Attendance	Scorers
8 August 1998	Bolton Wanderers	H	2–2	19,029	Jansen, Ćurčić
16 August 1998	Birmingham City	A	1–3	16,699	Mullins
22 August 1998	Oxford United	H	2–0	14,827	Dyer, Lombardo
29 August 1998	Stockport County	A	1–1	7,739	Shipperley
8 September 1998	Crewe Alexandra	A	1–0	4,977	Jansen
12 September 1998	Port Vale	H	0–1	15,983	
19 September 1998	Barnsley	A	0–4	15,597	
27 September 1998	Sheffield United	H	1–0	20,370	Ćurčić
30 September 1998	Bury	H	4–2	13,219	Warhurst, Dyer, Morrison, Lombardo (pen)
3 October 1998	Ipswich Town	A	0–3	16,837	
17 October 1998	Norwich City	H	5–1	18,100	Rizzo, Jansen (2), Svensson, Lombardo
20 October 1998	Wolverhampton Wanderers	H	3–2	16,417	Moore, Burton, Ćurčić
31 October 1998	Grimsby Town	A	0–2	6,948	
3 November 1998	West Bromwich Albion	A	2–3	11,606	Jansen, Moore
7 November 1998	Portsmouth	H	4–1	20,188	Moore, Thomson (own goal), Mullins, Foster
14 November 1998	Bristol City	H	2–1	17,821	Bradbury, Jansen
21 November 1998	Swindon Town	A	0–2	11,718	
28 November 1998	Watford	H	2–2	19,521	Tuttle, Ćurčić
5 December 1998	Huddersfield Town	A	0–4	10,453	
8 December 1998	Tranmere Rovers	H	1–1	12,919	Jansen
12 December 1998	Bristol City	A	1–1	13,014	Bell (own goal)
15 December 1998	Sunderland	A	0–2	33,870	
19 December 1998	Queens Park Rangers	H	1–1	17,684	Rodger
26 December 1998	Oxford United	A	3–1	8,375	Foster, Morrison, Bradbury (pen)
28 December 1998	West Bromwich Albion	H	1–1	19,137	Morrison
10 January 1999	Bolton Wanderers	A	0–3	15,410	
16 January 1999	Stockport County	H	2–2	15,517	Morrison, Fan
19 January 1999	Bradford City	A	1–2	14,368	Tuttle
30 January 1999	Tranmere Rovers	A	1–3	6,017	Bradbury
6 February 1999	Birmingham City	H	1–1	15,996	Rowett (own goal)
13 February 1999	Crewe Alexandra	H	1–1	14,823	Morrison
20 February 1999	Port Vale	A	0–1	6,051	
28 February 1999	Barnsley	H	1–0	17,021	Mullins
2 March 1999	Sheffield United	A	1–1	12,896	Petrić
6 March 1999	Bury	A	0–0	4,334	
9 March 1999	Ipswich Town	H	3–2	16,360	Mullins, Morrison (2)
13 March 1999	Portsmouth	A	1–1	15,120	Bradbury
20 March 1999	Grimsby Town	H	3–1	15,228	Morrison (2), Mullins
28 March 1999	Bradford City	H	1–0	15,626	Fan
3 April 1999	Norwich City	A	1–0	16,754	Austin
5 April 1999	Sunderland	H	1–1	22,096	Morrison
10 April 1999	Wolverhampton Wanderers	A	0–0	23,643	
17 April 1999	Swindon Town	H	0–1	18,660	
24 April 1999	Watford	A	1–2	15,590	McKenzie
1 May 1999	Huddersfield Town	H	2–2	17,282	Morrison (2)
9 May 1999	Queens Park Rangers	A	0–6	18,498	

=== FA Cup ===
Round	Date	Opponent	Venue	Result	Attendance	Goalscorers
R3	2 January 1999	Newcastle United	A	1–2	36,536	Bradbury

=== League Cup ===
Round	Date	Opponent	Venue	Result	Attendance	Goalscorers
R1 1st Leg	11 August 1998	Torquay United	A	1–1	3,042	Lombardo
R1 2nd Leg	25 August 1998	Torquay United	H	2–1 (won 3–2 on agg)	6,872	Lombardo, Hreiðarsson
R2 1st Leg	15 September 1998	Bury	A	0–3	2,780	
R2 2nd Leg	23 September 1998	Bury	H	2–1 (lost 2–4 on agg)	3,546	Morrison, Fan

=== Intertoto Cup ===
Round	Date	Opponent	Venue	Result	Attendance	Goalscorers
R3 1st Leg	19 July 1998	Samsunspor	H	0–2	11,758	
R3 2nd Leg	25 July 1998	Samsunspor	A	0–2 (lost 0–4 on agg)	6,000	

== Players ==
=== First-team squad ===
Squad at end of season

Note: Flags indicate national team as defined under FIFA eligibility rules; some limited exceptions apply. Players may hold more than one non-FIFA nationality.

No.	Pos.	Nation	Player
—	GK	ENG	Fraser Digby
—	GK	ENG	Kevin Miller
—	GK	RSA	Gareth Ormshaw
—	DF	ENG	Dean Austin
—	DF	ENG	Sagi Burton (Note: Burton was born in Birmingham, England, but also qualified to represent Saint Kitts and Nevis internationally and would make his international debut for Saint Kitts and Nevis in June 2004.)
—	DF	ENG	Jason Crowe (on loan from Arsenal)
—	DF	ENG	Marc Edworthy
—	DF	ENG	Andy Frampton
—	DF	ENG	Jimmy Hibburt
—	DF	ENG	Andy Linighan
—	DF	ENG	Jamie Smith
—	DF	ENG	Dave Tuttle
—	DF	ENG	Paul Warhurst
—	DF	ENG	David Woozley
—	DF	YUG	Gordan Petrić
—	DF	ISL	Hermann Hreiðarsson
—	DF	ISR	David Amsalem
—	DF	CHN	Sun Jihai
—	DF	CHN	Fan Zhiyi
—	DF	AUS	Craig Moore
—	MF	ENG	Hayden Mullins
—	MF	ENG	Simon Rodger (captain)

No.	Pos.	Nation	Player
—	MF	SCO	Jamie Fullarton
—	MF	WAL	Stephen Evans
—	MF	SCO	Steven Thomson
—	MF	NIR	Wayne Carlisle
—	MF	NIR	Gareth Graham
—	MF	IRL	Andy Turner (Note: Turner was born in Greenwich, England, but also qualified to represent the Republic of Ireland internationally and represented them at U-21 level.)
—	MF	ITA	Attilio Lombardo
—	MF	YUG	Saša Ćurčić
—	MF	ARG	Walter del Río
—	MF	AUS	Craig Foster
—	FW	ENG	Marcus Bent
—	FW	ENG	Lee Bradbury
—	FW	ENG	Bruce Dyer (Note: Dyer was born in Redbridge, England, and represented them at U-21 level, but also qualified to represent Montserrat internationally and would make his international debut for Montserrat in September 2007.)
—	FW	ENG	Richard Harris
—	FW	ENG	Matt Jansen
—	FW	ENG	Leon McKenzie
—	FW	ENG	Clinton Morrison (Note: Morrison was born in Wandsworth, England, but also qualified to represent the Republic of Ireland internationally through his grandmother and would make his international debut for the Republic of Ireland in August 2001.)
—	FW	ENG	Neil Shipperley
—	FW	WAL	Andy Martin
—	FW	ITA	Michele Padovano
—	FW	SWE	Mathias Svensson
—	FW	AUS	Nick Rizzo

== Other events ==
- The home game against Birmingham in February was used for some scenes in the cult British film Wonderland.
