= Ian Herring =

English footballer (born 1984)

Personal information
- Date of birth: 14 February 1984 (age 42)
- Place of birth: Swindon, England
- Position: Midfielder

Senior career*
Years	Team	Apps	(Gls)
2001–2004	Swindon Town	6	(0)
2002–2003	→ Salisbury City (loan)		
2003	→ Chippenham Town (loan)		
2003–2007	Chippenham Town		
2006–2009	Salisbury City	44	(0)
2009–2010	Northwich Victoria	29	(3)
2010–2011	Forest Green Rovers	13	(1)
2011	→ Eastleigh (loan)	5	(0)
2011–2012	Eastleigh	14	(0)
2012	→ Chippenham Town (loan)	4	(0)
2012–2020	Hungerford Town		

Managerial career
- 2017–2020: Hungerford Town
- * Club domestic league appearances and goals

Ian Herring (born 14 February 1984) is an English football player and manager, who plays as a midfielder. He was most recently player-manager of Hungerford Town.

== Career ==
Herring made his debut for Swindon Town on 20 April 2002, at home to Wycombe Wanderers in the 1–1 draw coming on as a substitute in the 89th minute replacing Paul McAreavey in the last game of the 2001–02 season.

He joined Salisbury City from Chippenham Town in August 2007 to pursue full-time football. In 2009, he was released by Salisbury City who he spent three-years as a player at the club. In July, Herring joined Conference North team Northwich Victoria. Herring left Northwich at the end of the season.

Herring signed for Conference National side Forest Green Rovers in June 2010.

In February 2011 Swindon Town manager Danny Wilson expressed an interest in taking Herring back to his home club after some impressive performances at the heart of midfield for Forest Green Rovers.

Herring joined Conference South side Eastleigh on loan for a month in February 2011, playing in 5 league matches. The move was then made permanent in March 2011. Herring finished the season with 13 league appearances in total.

On 27 January 2012, following several new signings at Eastleigh, Herring joined previous club Chippenham Town on a month's loan.

Herring left Eastleigh at the end of the season and in July 2012 it was announced he had signed for Southern League South & West Division side Hungerford Town. In September 2017 he was appointed joint player/manager alongside Jon Boardman. Herring left Hungerford Town in April 2020.
