= Gavin Heeroo =

British footballer (born 1984)

Personal information
- Full name: Gavin Harry Heeroo
- Date of birth: 2 September 1984 (age 42)
- Place of birth: Haringey, England
- Height: 6 ft 0 in (1.83 m)
- Position: Midfielder

Youth career
- ?–2002: Crystal Palace

Senior career*
Years	Team	Apps	(Gls)
2002–2004	Crystal Palace	1	(0)
2004	Billericay Town	?	(?)
2004–2005	Grays Athletic	0	(0)
2005–2006	Farnborough Town	6	(0)
2005–2006	Cambridge United	9	(0)
2006–2007	Chelmsford City	?	(?)
2007–2008	Fisher Athletic	?	(?)
2008–2009	Sutton United	?	(?)
2009	Eastleigh	?	(?)
2009–2010	Ebbsfleet United	32	(0)

International career^{‡}
2002	Mauritius	1	(0)
- * Club domestic league appearances and goals as of 00:13, 8 August 2011 (UTC) ‡ National team caps and goals as of 00:13, 8 August 2011 (UTC)

Gavin Harry Heeroo (born 2 September 1984) is an English former footballer.

== Career ==
Born in Haringey, London, Heeroo started his career with Crystal Palace as a trainee, making his first team debut as a substitute in a 1–1 draw with Preston North End in the First Division. He later joined Billericay Town, who he played for between July and October 2004, before moving to Grays Athletic, who he joined in October. He joined Farnborough Town in March 2005. He had an unsuccessful trial for Histon in September. He joined Cambridge United on a month's loan in November 2005. He then played for Chelmsford City, Fisher Athletic, Sutton United and Eastleigh. Heeroo joined Eastleigh in March 2009 from Isthmian League team Sutton United. He signed for Ebbsfleet United in August. Heroo was released by Ebbsfleet in the summer of 2010. He has played for the Mauritius national football team, earning one cap in 2002.

Outside of his football career, Heroo founded a fitness training business, Focus Fitness, alongside friend and former Crystal Palace teammate Dougie Freedman.
