= Tommy Black (footballer, born 1979) =

English footballer

Personal information
- Full name: Thomas Robert Black
- Date of birth: 26 November 1979 (age 46)
- Place of birth: Chigwell, England
- Height: 5 ft 7 in (1.70 m)
- Position: Midfielder

Youth career
- Arsenal

Senior career*
Years	Team	Apps	(Gls)
1998–2000	Arsenal	1	(0)
1999	→ Carlisle United (loan)	5	(1)
1999–2000	→ Bristol City (loan)	4	(0)
2000–2007	Crystal Palace	127	(10)
2004	→ Sheffield United (loan)	4	(1)
2006	→ Gillingham (loan)	17	(5)
2006	→ Bradford City (loan)	4	(0)
2007–2008	Southend United	38	(2)
2008–2009	Stevenage Borough	6	(0)
2009	Barnet	5	(0)
2009	Grays Athletic	9	(1)
2009	Grays Athletic	2	(0)
2009–2010	Hemel Hempstead Town	?	(?)
2010–2012	AFC Hornchurch	47	(11)
2013–2014	Debden Sports Club	9	(3)

Managerial career
- 2009–2010: Hemel Hempstead Town (player-assistant manager)
- * Club domestic league appearances and goals

Thomas Robert Black (born 26 November 1979) is an English former footballer. He played for multiple clubs in the Football League, making over 100 appearances for Crystal Palace at Championship level.

== Club career ==
Black began his career with Arsenal as a trainee, where he played alongside his older brother Michael. He was a regular in Arsenal's 1998 FA Premier Youth League-winning side, and was later sent out on loan twice for one month with Carlisle United and for a month with Bristol City. He made just two first team appearances for Arsenal, one in the League Cup against Middlesbrough on 30 November 1999 which Arsenal lost on penalties, and the other in the Premier League in a 1–0 win against Everton on 29 April 2000.

Unable to break into the Arsenal first team, Black signed for Crystal Palace in July 2000 for £500,000. Black played regularly and was well liked at Palace, receiving the Division One Player of the Month award in December 2002. After Palace were promoted a loan bid came in from Leeds United for both Black and Dougie Freedman – both were rejected. However, he did join Sheffield United on loan for a month in December 2004, scoring once against Coventry City, and in January 2006, still unable to break into the first team, he went out on loan again, this time to Gillingham, where he scored five goals and was an instant hit with the fans.

Nevertheless, Gillingham did not purchase him, and Black later had the choice of another loan move, to either Bradford City or Brentford. Black chose Bradford, after Brentford withdrew their bid through lack of funds, but his spell at Bradford was cut short after just six games, when he broke a rib. Black was released by Palace in May 2007 and on 3 July signed for Southend United on a Bosman transfer, rejecting the chance to join Watford. He was released by Southend United at the end of the 2007–08 season. This was followed by a short spell at Stevenage Borough before joining Barnet in January 2009, where he played in all five of the club's games during January before he was again released. He signed for Grays Athletic in March 2009. He made his debut in a 2–1 victory over Mansfield Town. Grays' squad was disbanded at the end of the season, however he rejoined the club at the start of the 2009–10 season. He was released on 31 August, after two substitute appearances.

Black linked up with his former Grays manager, Gary Phillips at Hemel Hempstead Town as a player-assistant manager in September 2009. On 1 April 2010, he joined AFC Hornchurch.

He signed for Debden Sports who play in the Essex Olympian Football League for the remainder of the 2012–13 season.

== Honours ==
Crystal Palace

- Football League First Division play-offs: 2004
