= Jon Boardman =

English footballer

Personal information
- Full name: Jonathan George Boardman
- Date of birth: 27 January 1981 (age 45)
- Place of birth: Reading, England
- Height: 6 ft 2 in (1.88 m)
- Position: Defender

Youth career
- ?–1998: Crystal Palace

Senior career*
| Years | Team | Apps | (Gls) |
| 1998–2002 | Crystal Palace | 0 | (0) |
| 2001 | → Woking (loan) | 9 | (0) |
| 2001 | → Margate (loan) | 3 | (1) |
| 2002–2005 | Woking | 129 | (4) |
| 2005–2007 | Rochdale | 25 | (1) |
| 2007–2009 | Dagenham & Redbridge | 36 | (3) |
| 2009–2010 | Woking | 20 | (0) |
| 2010 | Kingstonian | | |
| 2010–2018 | Hungerford Town | | |
- Mortimer FC

International career
| 2002–2004 | England C | 5 | (1) |

Managerial career
- 2017–2018: Hungerford Town
- * Club domestic league appearances and goals

Jonathan George Boardman (born 27 January 1981) is an English former professional footballer who was a joint player-manager at Hungerford Town. He is a first team coach at Basingstoke Town.

== Career ==
Boardman was born in Mortimer Common, Berkshire and joined Crystal Palace as a trainee in June 1999, turning professional on 7 July 2000. On 22 March 2001, he joined Woking on loan to gain some first-team experience in the Conference, returning to Palace at the end of the season.

On 23 August 2001, Boardman accompanied his Palace teammate David Woozley to Torquay United and began a week's trial (whilst Woozley was signed on a month's loan). However, he returned to Selhurst Park without being registered to play for the Gulls. It later transpired that Palace had thought he was joining Torquay on loan, whereas Torquay manager Roy McFarland had simply wanted to see him in training. In October 2001, he joined Conference side Margate on loan.

Later that season he joined Woking on loan, moving to the club on a permanent basis after three months on loan, on a free transfer in March 2002 after his release by Crystal Palace. He had not played a single first team game for Palace. He remained with Woking until May 2005 when he joined Rochdale.

He was a regular in his first season with Rochdale, but became a fringe player and had his contract cancelled by mutual consent on 22 January 2007. A week later he signed for Conference National side Dagenham & Redbridge.

In June 2009, Boardman rejoined Woking.

In June 2010, Boardman joined Isthmian League side Kingstonian to help with their 2010–11 campaign to get into the Conference South. However, after relocating back to Reading, Boardman decided to cancel his contract with Kingstonian and signed for Hungerford Town in the Southern League Division one South & West. He was "Supporters Player" of the season in his first two seasons and in 2011–12 completed the hattrick after receiving "Players' Player" and "Manager's Player". In September 2017, he was appointed joint player-manager alongside Ian Herring.

Boardman used to write a monthly column for UK football magazine Shoot Monthly.
