= Clinton Morrison =

Footballer (born 1979)

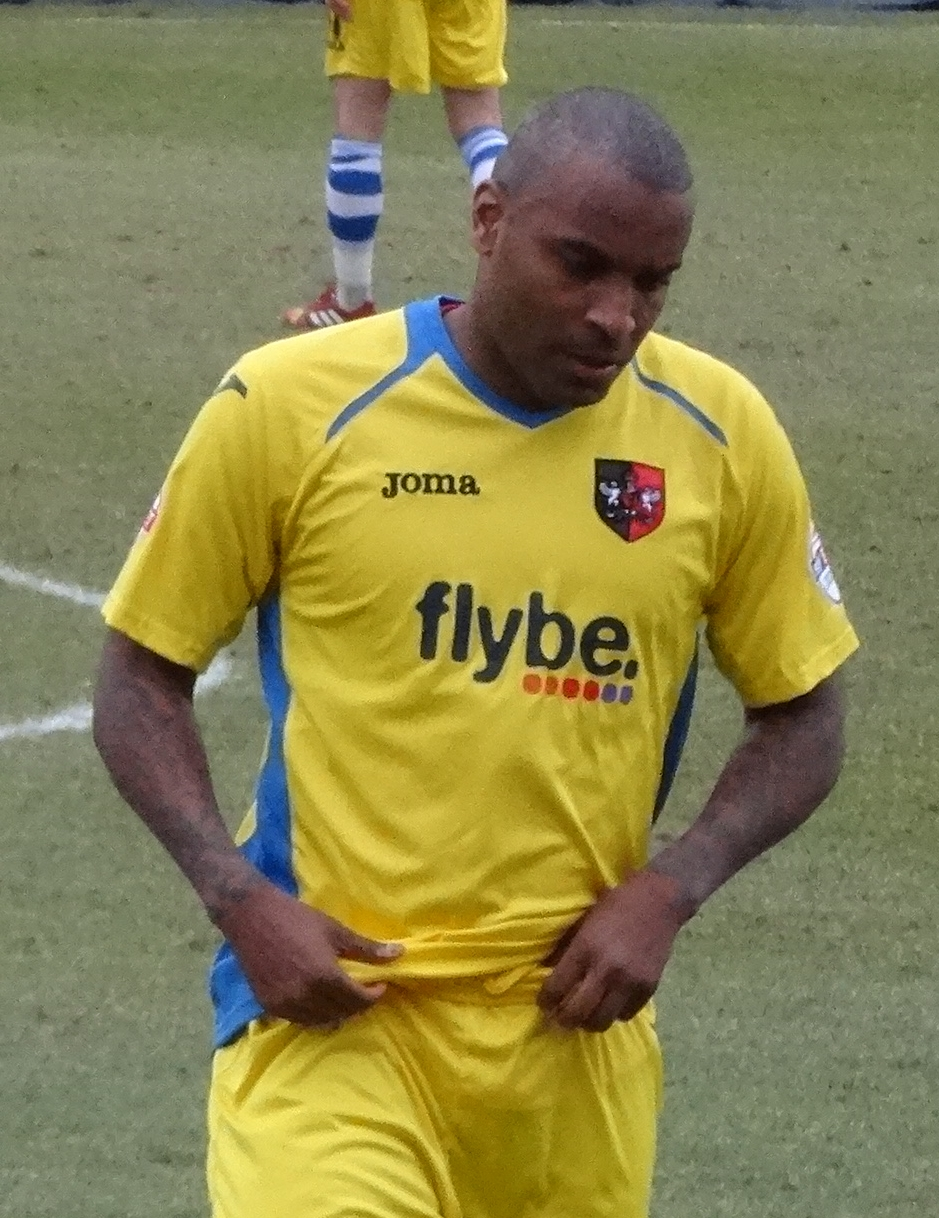
- Morrison playing for Exeter City in 2015

Personal information
- Full name: Clinton Hubert Morrison
- Birth name: Clinton Hubert Chambers
- Date of birth: 14 May 1979 (age 47)
- Place of birth: Tooting, England
- Height: 5 ft 10 in (1.78 m)
- Position: Forward

Youth career
- –1996: Tottenham Hotspur
- 1996–1998: Crystal Palace

Senior career*
Years	Team	Apps	(Gls)
1998–2002	Crystal Palace	157	(61)
2002–2005	Birmingham City	87	(14)
2005–2008	Crystal Palace	124	(41)
2008–2010	Coventry City	91	(21)
2010–2012	Sheffield Wednesday	54	(7)
2011	→ Milton Keynes Dons (loan)	6	(3)
2012	→ Brentford (loan)	8	(0)
2012–2014	Colchester United	65	(4)
2014	Long Eaton United	3	(1)
2014–2016	Exeter City	45	(1)
2016	Redditch United	3	(1)
2016–2017	Mickleover Sports	28	(2)
Total		671	(156)

International career
2000	Republic of Ireland U21	2	(0)
2001–2006	Republic of Ireland	36	(9)
- * Club domestic league appearances and goals

Clinton Hubert Morrison (né Chambers; born 14 May 1979) is a former professional footballer and sports pundit.

As a player, he was a forward. He played in the Premier League for both Crystal Palace and Birmingham City. He also played in the Football League for Coventry City, Sheffield Wednesday, Milton Keynes Dons, Brentford, Colchester United and Exeter City. He also played non-league football for Long Eaton United, Redditch United and Mickleover Sports.

Born in England, he represented the Republic of Ireland 36 times at full international level, scoring nine goals, and made their squad for the 2002 FIFA World Cup. He is a regular reporter and occasional pundit on Sky Sports Soccer Saturday.

== Club career ==
=== First spell at Crystal Palace ===
Born in Tooting, London, Morrison began his career as a trainee at Crystal Palace on 1 August 1997. Morrison was previously at Tottenham Hotspur before they let him go at sixteen. Before his time at Spurs, he had played junior football for Raynes Park Vale FC (which was formerly known as Malden Vale FC).

He began his career at Crystal Palace of the Premier League, making his debut on 10 May 1998 as an 82nd-minute substitute for Neil Shipperley, and scoring the injury-time winner over opponents Sheffield Wednesday.

At the start of the 1998–99 season, Morrison appeared in the second leg of the UEFA Intertoto Cup third round against Samsunspor, eventually losing 4–0 on aggregate. He then scored two goals against Bury in two separate matches on 23 September 1998 and 30 September 1998. Morrison quickly became a first team regular for the club, becoming Crystal Palace's first choice striker. He later scored three braces on three separate occasions as the 1998–99 season progressed. In his first full year-long tenure at the club he scored 13 goals, while Palace were struggling both on and off the pitch. Whilst they were in administration, Morrison agreed to play for the club for free.

In the 1999–2000 season, Morrison scored six goals in the first two months to the season before. suffering an injury that kept him for the rest of the year. His return included his only brace of the season at Swindon Town. Financial difficulties meant that Crystal Palace were unable to make new signings for the 1999–2000 season and relied on youngsters such as Morrison and Hayden Mullins and veterans such as Andy Linighan as they successfully battled against relegation from the First Division. At the end of the 1999–00 season, Morrison had scored 14 goals, making him the club's top scorer.

At the start of the 2000–01 season, Morrison was placed on a transfer list by new manager Alan Smith despite signing a four–year contract with Crystal Palace. Nevertheless, he formed a partnership with either Dougie Freedman and Mikael Forssell. Having only scored three goals by mid–October, Morrison scored in five appearances between 28 October 2000 and 18 November 2000, including two against Wolverhampton Wanderers. His scored six goals in December. His performance at the club attracted interests from Premiership clubs. Morrison scored in the first leg of the semi-final of the League Cup, winning 2–1 against Liverpool, but the club lost 5–0 in the return leg. Morrison scored only three more goals that season. as the club narrowly escaped relegation. At the end of the 2000–01, he had scored 19 goals, making him the club's top scorer for the third season in a row.

At the start of the 2001–02 season, Morrison scored eight goals in the first two months. His performance in a number of matches was praised by Manager Steve Bruce. Morrison remained Palace's first choice striker throughout the 2001–02 season. He then scored five goals, including a brace against Bradford City and Norwich City throughout October. Morrison later added three goals by the end of the year. In the first three months of 2002, he scored five times, including a brace against Gillingham on 16 January 2002. His performance was praised by new Manager Trevor Francis. The following month, Morrison scored a total of three goals in five appearances. Despite being sidelined with injuries during the 2001–02 season, Morrison finished the season, making forty–nine appearances and scoring twenty–four times, making him Crystal Palace's top scorer for the fourth time in a row. For his performance, he finished second place behind Freedman for the club's Player of the Year.

=== Birmingham City ===
Over the summer transfer of 2002, Morrison was linked a move away from Crystal Palace, with Premier League clubs, including Birmingham City, were interested in signing him. But Manager Trevor Francis was willing to sell the player if the club signed a replacement, although Simon Jordan objected to this. With a tricky relationship becoming clear between Morrison and Trevor Francis, then Palace manager, it was Birmingham City who fought and won his signature, for £4.25 million, in exchange for Andrew Johnson.

However, his start to his Birmingham City's career suffered a setback when he sustained a groin injury during the club's pre–season that saw him miss two matches. Morrison made his debut for Birmingham City, coming on as an 81st-minute substitute, in a 1–1 draw against Everton on 28 August 2002. On 11 September 2002, he scored his first goals, in a 2–2 draw against Liverpool. This was followed up by scoring his third goal for the club against Aston Villa, their first win in 16 years following their return to the top flight, during a 3–0 victory at St. Andrews. His fourth goal for Birmingham City came on 23 November 2002, in a 1–0 win against Sunderland. During a 1–0 win against Fulham on 15 December 2002, in which Morrison set up the only goal of the game, he was involved in an argument with Rufus Brevett that his mother got involved following the match, though both clubs said the incident never happened. After missing one match due to injury, he scored on two weeks after his return from injury, in a 4–2 loss against Bolton Wanderers on 1 February 2003. Three weeks later, Morrison scored for the second time this season against Liverpool on 23 February 2003, in a 2–1 win. However, he dislocated his shoulder during a 1–0 win against West Bromwich Albion on 22 March 2003 and was sidelined for the rest of the 2002–03 season. In his first season at Birmingham City, Morrison became a first team regular, becoming the club's first choice striker but struggled somewhat in the top league, scoring only six goals in twenty–nine appearances.

Morrison made his first appearance of the 2003–04 season, coming on as an 81st-minute substitute, in a 0–0 draw against Southampton on 23 August 2003. Since returning to the first team, he found himself behind the pecking order and played as Birmingham City's second striker. On 13 December 2003, Morrison scored his first goal of the season, in a 2–0 win against Leicester City. He later scored four more goals, including scoring two goals in two consecutive matches against Charlton Athletic and Wolverhampton Wanderers. Despite not able to produce goals as done before, Morrison's commitment and hard work were praised by his teammates. At the end of the 2003–04 season, he made thirty–seven appearances and scoring five times in all competitions.

At the start of the 2004–05 season, Morrison was sidelined with a knee injury while on international duty and was sidelined for a month. On 28 August 2004, he returned to the first team, coming on as a 72nd-minute substitute, in a 1–0 loss against Tottenham Hotspur. Since returning from injury, Morrison rotated in and out of the starting line–up, but around the same time, he began to form a decent strike partnership with Emile Heskey. On 21 September 2004, Morrison scored his first goal of the season, in a 3–1 win against Lincoln City in the third round of the League Cup. However, he suffered a knee injury while on international duty and was sidelined for a month. On 21 November 2004, Morrison returned to the starting line–up against Blackburn Rovers and played 65 minutes before being substituted, as Birmingham City drew 3–3. In a follow–up match against Norwich City, he scored his second goal of the season, in a 1–1 draw. He then scored three goals in three consecutive matches between 12 December 2004 and 26 December 2004. Following a 2–1 loss against Bolton Wanderers on 4 January 2005, Morrison was charged by the FA for his improper conduct and was expected to serve a one match suspension; instead, he was fined and warned of the conduct. On 14 January 2005, Morrison began talks with Birmingham City over a new contract. Following this, he continued to rotate in and out of the starting line–up as the 2004–05 season progressed. At the end of the 2004–05 season, Morrison made twenty–nine appearances and scoring five times in all competitions.

Due to pressure for first team places, Morrison wanted to leave Birmingham City to get first team football. As a result, he was linked with a move away from the club, as Norwich City and Southampton were interested in signing him. Amid the transfer speculation, Morrison made his only appearance of the 2005–06 season, in a 0–0 draw against Fulham in the opening game of the season.

=== Return to Crystal Palace ===
Morrison left Birmingham on 24 August 2005 to return to Crystal Palace after they agreed a £2 million fee for the 26-year-old. He claimed that a large part of his decision to return (besides his love for the club) was, ironically, due to being able to play alongside Andrew Johnson, the man Birmingham had originally swapped to get Morrison.

Morrison made his second Crystal Palace debut, coming on as a 75th-minute substitute, in a 2–0 win against Stoke City on 27 August 2005. He then scored in the next two matches against Hull City and Reading. Morrison went on to score six goals by the end of the year, including two braces on two separate occasions. Since returning to the club, Morrison had a successful first season back at Crystal Palace, alternating with former strike-partner Dougie Freedman in playing alongside Johnson. He then made his 200th appearance for the club, starting the match and played 82 minutes before being substituted, in a 1–1 draw against Wolverhampton Wanderers on 10 December 2005. Morrison later scored five more goals later in the 2005–06 season. Having aimed at personal target to get back to the Premier League, he later helped Crystal Palace qualify for the Championship Play–Offs despite missing one match, due to a broken jaw. However, Morrison only played in the first leg of the play–offs, as the club lost 3–0 on aggregate against Watford. In his first season back at Crystal Palace, he made forty–four appearances and scoring twelve times in all competitions. Throughout the 2005–06 season, there were reports over claims that Morrison was involved in a bust up with Manager Iain Dowie. Your Local Guardian said that "We haven't seen the best from Morrison due to the lack of games he has been given, but Clinton is Mr Crystal Palace. He love this club and when AJ leaves us it'll be the partnership of Morrison and Freedman who will be firing us back into the Premiership."

At the start of the 2006–07 season, Morrison scored his first goal of the season, in a 1–0 win against Leeds United on 13 August 2006. After the match, Manager Peter Taylor praised his performance despite lacking fitness that saw him placed on the substitute bench. His second goal of the season came a month later on 23 September 2006, in a 1–0 win against Coventry City. However, he found himself in a rift with Manager Peter Taylor that saw him placed on the substitute bench. But Crystal Palace's chairman Simon Jordan responded to the claims that the pair had not fallen out, with Taylor having dealt with Morrison over their differences. He then managed to regain his first team place, making a number of starts as the club's first choice striker for the rest of the 2006. Morrison then added four more goals by the end of the year. This lasted until January when he found himself placed on the substitute bench, appearing in the club's four out of the club's six matches during the month. By February, Morrison regained his first team place as Crystal Palace's first choice striker once again. Towards the end of the 2006–07 season, Morrison scored six more goals, including three goals in two consecutive matches against Luton Town and Burnley. Despite failing to help the club reach the play–offs, he expressed his desire to stay at Crystal Palace. At the end of the 2006–07 season, Morrison went on to make forty–four appearances and scoring twelve times in all competitions, making him as the club's top scorer for the fifth time in his Crystal Palace's career.

Ahead of the 2007–08 season, Morrison was given a number ten shirt at the club once again, having wore the number shirt in his first career at the club. He started the season brightly scoring twice in the first three games, taking himself to 99 goals in his Palace career. However, Morrison's target to score his 100th goal in his Crystal Palace's career became an albatross round his neck, and manager Peter Taylor dropped him from the starting line-up for several games. It was under new manager Neil Warnock that Morrison eventually scored his 100th Crystal Palace goal in the London derby against Queens Park Rangers (a club he has a knack for scoring against) on 10 November 2007, with an 88th-minute equaliser, making him the eighth player in the club's history to reach this milestone. Two years ago, Morrison said his aim was to score 100 goals for Crystal Palace. He was given a Special Achievement Award to mark this feat at the end of the season's "Player of the Year" ceremony. Despite suffering a knee injury, Morrison quickly recovered and scored a brace, in a 2–1 win against Colchester United on 24 November 2007. After breaking the 100th goal deadlock for the club, Morrison hit a purple patch of scoring, including five goals by the end of 2007. He then scored three goals in three consecutive matches between 1 January 2008 and 19 January 2008 against Norwich City, Wolverhampton Wanderers and Bristol City. His performance was praised by Warnock. He later finished his Crystal Palace's career with 113 goals in all competitions for the club, the fifth-highest of any player in the Crystal Palace's history. He scored on the final day of the 2007–08 season in a 5–0 win over Burnley that confirmed the club's play-off place, meaning that he had scored in his first and last league games for Crystal Palace. Morrison played in both legs of the Championship play–offs against Bristol City, as the club lost 4–2 on aggregate. At the end of the 2007–08 season, he went on to make forty–seven appearances and scoring sixteen times in all competitions, making, making him as Crystal Palace's top scorer for the sixth time in his club career.

This was Morrison's last season at Crystal Palace, with his contract expiring at the end of the season. Morrison wanted to stay at Palace but manager Neil Warnock said that he would have to fight for his place in the starting line-up. Morrison then took a higher wage offer to move to Coventry City after the club withdrew the contract offer for him.

=== Coventry City ===
In July 2008, Morrison trained with Coventry City and accompanied them on their pre-season tour of Switzerland. He signed a two-year deal with the club on 7 August 2008. Upon joining Coventry City, Morrison wore the number 19 shirt during the 2008–09 season with a plus sign between the 1 and 9 (appearing on the back of his shirt as 1+9). The reason for this being that 1+9 equals 10, which was the number Morrison played with whilst at Palace.

Initially, Morrison suffered an injury while training but quickly recovered. He made his debut for the club in the opening game of the season against Norwich City and set up the second goal of the game, in a 2–0 win. Morrison followed up by scoring two goals in the League Cup matches against Aldershot Town and Newcastle United. Since joining Coventry City, Morrison quickly became a first team regular for the side, forming a partnership with Freddy Eastwood.

Having failed to score for the club for the next two months, he scored three goals in three consecutive matches between 25 October 2008 and 3 November 2008 against Derby County, Southampton and Birmingham City. Having expressed confidence of scoring more goals, Morrison scored five more goals by the end of the year. As the 2008–09 season progressed, he also captained the club in a number of matches in the absence of Scott Dann and given full time by April. Despite only scoring two more goals, Morrison remained Coventry City's top scorer at the end of the 2008–09 season with thirteen times. Although he missed one match during the season, Morrison made fifty–two appearances in all competitions.

Initially, Morrison wanted the number ten shirt ahead of the 2009–10 season. Instead, he changed to wearing number eleven shirt. Morrison started the season well when he scored twice against Ipswich Town and once against Barnsley. A month later, Morrison scored three consecutive goals between 15 September 2009 and 26 September 2009 against Sheffield United, Preston North End and Middlesbrough. Since the start of the 2009–10 season, he continued to regain his first team place as Coventry City's first choice striker. By December, Morrison found his playing time, mostly coming from the substitute bench and proved to have worked, as he scored three goals between 26 December 2009 and 16 January 2010 to end his goal drought. However, Morrison expressed his concerns over his reputation as a super sub. He later scored two more goals in the 2009–10 season.

Despite suffering from an injury along the way, he appeared in every league match, making forty–nine appearances and scoring eleven times in all competitions, making him the top scorer once again. At the end of the 2009–10 season, Morrison said he was keen to sign a new contract with the club, but Coventry City told him he was surplus to requirements and he was subsequently released.

=== Sheffield Wednesday ===
On 12 July 2010, Morrison signed a two-year contract with Sheffield Wednesday, newly relegated to League One.

Morrison scored on his league debut for the Owls in a 2–0 win over Dagenham & Redbridge in the opening game of the season. His second goal for the club came on 28 August 2010, in a 5–0 win against Hartlepool United. Since joining the Owls, he has been involved in the first team, becoming the club's first choice striker despite facing new competitions along the way. Morrison went on to score five more goals by the end of the year, including a brace against Southport on 7 November 2010. By the second half of the season, he added four more goals, including another brace against Hereford United on 29 January 2011. However, Morrison struggled to keep his place in the team towards the end of the season after new manager Gary Megson arrived, as Gary Madine and loan signing Neil Mellor kept him out of the side. At the end of the 2010–11 season, he went on to make forty–three appearances and scoring eleven times in all competitions.

At the start of the 2011–12 season, Morrison continued to remain involved in the first team, starting in eight out of the eleven matches for Sheffield Wednesday. He then scored two goals for the club, coming against Blackburn Rovers and Charlton Athletic. Morrison also contributed two assists, coming against Notts County and Milton Keynes Dons (which he ironically joined). Despite his involvement, Manager Megson placed him on a transfer list and expected the player to leave. But following his return from a loan spell at Milton Keynes Dons, Morrison made his first appearance for Sheffield Wednesday for the first time in a month, against Wycombe Wanderers on 29 October 2011, coming on as a 76th-minute substitute, as the club won 2–1. He then set up goal for Chris O'Grady to score the only goal of the game against West Ham United to send Sheffield Wednesday through to the next round. Three weeks later on 28 January 2012, Morrison scored his third goal for the club, in a 1–1 draw against Blackpool in the fourth round of the FA Cup. However, he continued to have his playing time from the substitute bench. At the end of the 2011–12 season, Morrison made twenty–six appearances and scoring three times for Sheffield Wednesday in all competitions.

It was announced on 16 May 2012 that Sheffield Wednesday released Morrison at the end of the 2011–12 season. He previously waive his right to a new contract in order to help the club win promotion.

==== Loan Spells from Milton Keynes Dons ====
On 24 September 2011, Morrison signed for Milton Keynes Dons on a one-month emergency loan. On the same day, he made his debut for the club, coming on as 58th-minute substitute, in a 0–0 draw against Bury. On his third appearance for the Dons, Morrison scored his first goal for the club, against Notts County on 1 October 2011, as well as making one assist. This was followed up by scoring in the next two matches against Oldham Athletic and Bournemouth. Despite keen on staying at Milton Keynes Dons, Morrison returned to his parent club after they demanded more money from Dons in order to allow him to stay further. By the time he left the club, he made six appearances and scoring three times for the side.

Morrison joined League One club Brentford on 24 March 2012 on loan until the end of the season. He made his debut for the club two days later, coming on as an 82nd-minute substitute, in a 2–0 win against Rochdale. Morrison later made eight appearances for Brentford.

=== Colchester United ===
On 16 July 2012, Morrison signed a two-year deal with League One side Colchester United following his release from Sheffield Wednesday. Upon joining the club, he was given a number nine shirt for the new season.

Morrison went on to make his debut for the U's in a 3–0 League Cup defeat away at Yeovil Town, before leading the line to begin the new Football League season four days later in a 0–0 draw at Deepdale against Preston North End. His first goal for Colchester arrived towards the end of August in the third game of the season, as his late equaliser salvaged a 1–1 draw for the U's; their third successive draw to start the season. He celebrated the goal by running the length of the pitch with his hands cupped behind his ears to taunt the Sheffield United fans who, throughout the game, had been doing likewise to the striker for his connections with their city rivals, Wednesday. Joe Dunne took over as the U's boss at the end of September and immediately brought in Jabo Ibehre on loan from Milton Keynes Dons, with the loanee displacing Morrison from the starting eleven and consigning him to the bench. Dunne's fourth game in charge was a Football League Trophy defeat to Northampton Town where Morrison was handed a start, but he was dismissed for violent conduct in the closing stages of the game which would suspend the striker for three matches after the club decided against appealing his ban. The impressive form of Ibehre ensured that Morrison only started four more games for the U's until March, when injury to Freddie Sears created a hole in attack. This was coupled with Ibehre receiving a three-match suspension and Morrison went on to spearhead the U's attack once more, providing crucial experience in Colchester's bid for League One survival. In his fourth successive start, he notched his second U's goal in a 2–1 win away at Bury; a vital match-winning goal in a crunch relegation fixture. The club went on secure safety on the final day of the season with a 2–0 win at Carlisle United finishing in 20th place. At the end of the 2012–13 season, Morrison went on to make thirty–five appearances and scoring two times in all competitions.

However at the start of the 2013–14 season, injuries and competitions limited Morrison's first team opportunities. Following the absence of Ibehre, he began to appear in the starting eleven in a number of matches for Colchester United, while also trying to score goals on a regular basis. Despite not able to score as expected, his performance was praised nevertheless by Manager Dunne. Morrison registered his first goal of the 2013–14 campaign on 30 November, scoring an injury-time consolation goal against Tranmere Rovers at Prenton Park to bring his U's tally to three goals in 50 appearances in all competitions. He scored his second of the season late-on during a 3–0 win against Gillingham on 11 January 2014. As the 2013–14 season progressed, Morrison continued to remain involved in the first team despite being placed on the substitute bench. He played his final game for the U's in their 1–0 away victory over Walsall on 3 May 2014. At the end of the 2013–14 season, Morrison made thirty–six appearances and scoring two times in all competitions.

Morrison announced in the latter stages of the season that he would leave Colchester once his contract expired in the summer.

=== Later career ===
Morrison played three matches for Long Eaton United in the Midland League, scoring once himself and also dummying Lye Town's goalkeeper into letting a backpass into the net, before signing for League Two club Exeter City in November 2014 on non-contract terms.

Morrison made his Exeter City debut, coming on as a 67th-minute substitute, in a 1–1 draw against Burton Albion on 6 December 2014. On 15 January 2015, it was announced that he would stay at the club for the rest of the 2014–15 season. Since joining Exeter City, he found his playing time, mostly from the substitute bench. Despite this, his starts in attacks at the starting eleven saw him assisted five times, including two consecutive separate assists. Morrison played 25 league matches in what remained of the season, and was then released, but rejoined the club on a short-term deal ahead of the 2015–16 campaign.

Following his three appearances at the start of the season, Morrison's with stay at Exeter City was extended beyond its initial one-month period. He then contributed four assists, including a brace against Accrington Stanley on 19 September 2015. A month later on 11 October 2015, Morrison scored his first goal for the club, in a 3–3 draw against Stevenage. A month later on 8 November 2015, he scored his second goal for Exeter City, as well as, setting up one of the club's goals, in a 3–0 win against Didcot Town in the FA Cup match. It was announced on 31 December 2015 that Morrison signed a contract extension with Exeter City until the end of the season. However, his first team appearances was later restricted to the substitute bench, resulting in making twenty–five appearances and scoring two times in all competitions. Morrison was released by Exeter City at the end of the 2015–16 season and duly signed for Southern Premier Division side Redditch United in June 2016.

In September 2016, Morrison joined Mickleover Sports. He made his debut for the club, starting a match and played 79 minutes before being substituted, in a match against Stourbridge. A year later, Morrison joined the club as their first team coach, having earned himself a UEFA B licence coaching badge. In doing so, he quietly announced his retirement from professional football.

== International career ==
Apart from England, the country of his birth, Morrison was also eligible to represent Jamaica and the Republic of Ireland. Initially interested to play for England, he chose to play for Ireland, qualifying for that country because his grandmother was from Dublin.

In May 2001, Morrison was called up to the Republic of Ireland U21 squad for the first time. He went on to make two appearances for the U21 side.

=== Republic of Ireland ===
In August 2001, Morrison was called up to the senior team squad for the first time. Morrison made his debut for Ireland in a 2–2 draw on 15 August 2001 against Croatia; he entered the game as a 52nd-minute substitute and scored the national side's second goal of the game. Morrison then played in the second leg of World Cup Play–Off against Iran, coming on as a 75th-minute substitute, as Ireland went on to win 2–1 on aggregate to qualify for the World Cup. He later describe playing in Iran as "one of the craziest atmospheres he ever played in".

Morrison then scored his second national goal, in a 3–0 win against Denmark on 27 March 2002 when "his pace and directness continued to cause the Danish defence problems and, in injury time Colin Healy and David Connolly combined to leave him a chance which he side-footed in". He was selected by Mick McCarthy as part of the Republic of Ireland squad for the 2002 World Cup in South Korea and Japan. However, he did not play. Morrison's international career began to gain momentum during his time at Birmingham City. He scored his first competitive international goal in a 4–2 European Championship qualifying defeat to Russia in Moscow in September 2002. The next two years saw Morrison scored two more goals for Republic of Ireland in a friendly match against Scotland and Australia.

Morrison later became a key part of the side as the Republic of Ireland competed for a place at World Cup 2006. He scored three goals in the qualifying campaign, but Brian Kerr's side finished fourth in a tight group that included Switzerland, France and Israel. At one point during the qualifying campaign, Morrison accused Alexander Frei of making a racist comment to him during the Switzerland and Republic of Ireland match on 9 September 2004. Frei refuted Morrison's claim, and no sanctions were levied against Frei.

Despite scoring in 11 out of 14 games for Palace, Morrison was not called into the Ireland squad to face Brazil in a friendly in February 2008. However, his continued good form with Palace led to him being recognised by Ireland coach Giovanni Trapattoni in his first provisional 40-man squad, though he did not make it to the 28-man squad. Following this, Morrison was never featured in the national team squad and ended his international career, making thirty–six appearances and scoring nine times.

== Media career ==
Morrison did some media work as a pundit on Sky Sports and Football League Tonight on Channel 5.

In September 2020, Sky Sports announced Morrison as their new pundit for Soccer Saturday.

He is a regular match pundit for live commentary on BBC Radio 5 Live.

== Personal life ==
Growing up, Morrison supported Tottenham Hotspur, but idolised Ian Wright. He revealed in an interview with The Guardian that he "grew up in a broken home in south London" with his mother and sister. Morrison was known as Clinton Chambers before changing his surname when he was 15. The impetus for the change was his father walking out on the family when Morrison was seven years old, leaving his mother to raise two children alone.

Morrison later credited his mother for being a big influence in his life, saying: "She did everything for me, my Mum. Everything. She kept me in school when I didn't want no lessons, she brought me to games, she kept my chin up. I don't think I would have turned bad, doing crimes and that. It's not me, not the way I am, but in the same way I don't know what would have happened. There was a lot of crime going on." Clinton is a father to two boys; one of whom is following in his footsteps and is signed to Nottingham Forest Academy. He since resided in Long Eaton, while also working in broadcasting.

Morrison has been involved in campaigning against racism in English football, having experienced racism himself. During his professional football career he was a mentor to some footballers, including Patrick van Aanholt.

In August 2003, Morrison was questioned by police on suspicion of illegal drug possession but did not face charges after questioning.

== Career statistics ==
=== Club ===
Appearances and goals by club, season and competition
Club	Season	League			FA Cup		League Cup		Other		Total	
Club	Season	Division	Apps	Goals	Apps	Goals	Apps	Goals	Apps	Goals	Apps	Goals
Crystal Palace	1997–98	Premier League	1	1	0	0	0	0	–		1	1
Crystal Palace	1998–99	First Division	37	12	1	0	3	1	–		41	13
Crystal Palace	1999–2000	First Division	29	12	0	0	4	2	–		33	14
Crystal Palace	2000–01	First Division	45	14	2	1	9	4	–		56	19
Crystal Palace	2001–02	First Division	45	22	1	0	3	2	–		49	24
Crystal Palace	Total		157	61	4	1	19	9	–		180	71
Birmingham City	2002–03	Premier League	28	6	1	0	1	0	–		30	6
Birmingham City	2003–04	Premier League	32	4	4	1	1	0	–		37	5
Birmingham City	2004–05	Premier League	26	4	2	0	1	1	–		29	5
Birmingham City	2005–06	Premier League	1	0	0	0	0	0	–		1	0
Birmingham City	Total		87	14	7	1	3	1	–		97	16
Crystal Palace	2005–06	Championship	40	13	1	0	2	0	1 (Note: Appearance in Football League play-offs)	0	44	13
Crystal Palace	2006–07	Championship	41	12	2	0	1	0	–		44	12
Crystal Palace	2007–08	Championship	43	16	1	0	1	0	2	0	47	16
Crystal Palace	Total		124	41	4	0	4	0	3	0	135	41
Coventry City	2008–09	Championship	45	10	5	0	2	2	–		52	12
Coventry City	2009–10	Championship	46	11	2	0	1	0	–		49	11
Coventry City	Total		91	21	7	0	3	2	–		101	23
Sheffield Wednesday	2010–11	League One	35	6	5	5	2	0	4 (Note: Appearance in Football League Trophy)	0	46	11
Sheffield Wednesday	2011–12	League One	19	1	4	1	2	1	1	0	26	3
Sheffield Wednesday	Total		54	7	9	6	4	1	5	0	72	14
MK Dons (loan)	2011–12	League One	6	3	0	0	0	0	0	0	6	3
Brentford (loan)	2011–12	League One	8	0	0	0	0	0	0	0	8	0
Colchester United	2012–13	League One	32	2	1	0	1	0	1	0	35	2
Colchester United	2013–14	League One	33	2	1	0	1	0	1	0	36	2
Colchester United	Total		65	4	2	0	2	0	2	0	71	4
Long Eaton United	2014–15	Midland League Premier	3	1	—		—				3	1
Exeter City	2014–15	League Two	25	0	—		—		—		25	0
Exeter City	2015–16	League Two	20	1	1	1	1	0	2	0	24	2
Exeter City	Total		45	1	1	1	1	0	2	0	49	2
Career total			640	153	34	9	36	13	12	0	722	175

=== International ===
Appearances and goals by national team and year
National team	Year	Apps	Goals
Ireland	2001	3	1
Ireland	2002	6	2
Ireland	2003	6	2
Ireland	2004	10	2
Ireland	2005	8	2
Ireland	2006	3	0
Ireland	Total	36	9

Scores and results list Ireland's goal tally first, score column indicates score after each Morrison goal.

List of international goals scored by Clinton Morrison
No.	Date	Venue	Opponent	Score	Result	Competition	Ref.
1	15 August 2001	Lansdowne Road, Dublin	Croatia	2–0	2–2	Friendly match	
2	27 March 2002	Lansdowne Road, Dublin	Denmark	3–0	3–0	Friendly match	
3	7 September 2002	Dinamo Stadium, Moscow	Russia	2–3	2–4	UEFA Euro 2004 qualifier	
4	12 February 2003	Hampden Park, Glasgow	Scotland	2–0	2–0	Friendly match	
5	19 August 2003	Lansdowne Road, Dublin	Australia	2–1	2–1	Friendly match	
6	4 September 2004	Lansdowne Road, Dublin	Cyprus	1–0	3–0	2006 FIFA World Cup qualifier	
7	8 September 2004	St. Jakob Park, Basel	Switzerland	1–0	1–1	2006 FIFA World Cup qualifier	
8	26 March 2005	Ramat Gan Stadium, Ramat Gan	Israel	1–0	1–1	2006 FIFA World Cup qualifier	
9	29 March 2005	Lansdowne Road, Dublin	China	1–0	1–0	Friendly match	

== See also ==
- List of Republic of Ireland international footballers born outside the Republic of Ireland
