= Dougie Freedman =

Scottish footballer (born 1974)

Personal information
- Full name: Douglas Alan Freedman
- Date of birth: 25 May 1974 (age 52)
- Place of birth: Glasgow, Scotland
- Height: 5 ft 9 in (1.75 m)
- Position: Striker

Team information
- Current team: Diriyah (sporting director)

Youth career
- 1992–1994: Queens Park Rangers

Senior career*
Years	Team	Apps	(Gls)
1994–1995	Barnet	47	(27)
1995–1997	Crystal Palace	90	(31)
1997–1998	Wolverhampton Wanderers	29	(10)
1998–2000	Nottingham Forest	70	(18)
2000–2008	Crystal Palace	237	(64)
2008	→ Leeds United (loan)	11	(5)
2008–2010	Southend United	36	(6)
Total		520	(161)

International career
1994–1995	Scotland U21	8	(2)
2001–2002	Scotland	2	(1)

Managerial career
- 2011–2012: Crystal Palace
- 2012–2014: Bolton Wanderers
- 2015–2016: Nottingham Forest
- * Club domestic league appearances and goals

Douglas Alan Freedman (born 25 May 1974) is a Scottish professional football manager and former player. He has been the sporting director of Diriyah since 2025.

Freedman played as a striker, primarily for Crystal Palace, and also had spells as a player at Queens Park Rangers, Barnet, Wolverhampton Wanderers, Nottingham Forest, Leeds United and Southend United. Freedman had two caps for the Scotland national team where he scored one goal in a 2002 World Cup qualifier against Latvia.

Freedman started his managerial career with Crystal Palace in 2011. He moved to fellow Championship club Bolton Wanderers in 2012, but left this position in October 2014. He became manager of Nottingham Forest in February 2015, with whom he parted company in March 2016.

== Club career ==
=== Barnet ===
Freedman began his career with top flight Queens Park Rangers in 1992, but never made their first team. He moved to Third Division Barnet on a free transfer in July 1994, aged 20. He made his league debut in August 1994 and quickly became the club's leading player as he struck 24 goals in his debut season. A bright start to the following season attracted the interest of Crystal Palace. Despite only spending a short spell at Barnet at the beginning of his playing career, Freedman was voted as the fans' favourite player in the club's all-time history in late 2007.

=== Crystal Palace ===
Freedman was signed by Crystal Palace for a fee of £800,000 in September 1995. He instantly showed he could continue his goalscoring form at the higher level when he netted 20 times in the 1995–96 season. This haul included an 11-minute hat-trick against Grimsby Town on 5 March 1996.

The following, 1996–97 season saw a less prolific 11 league goals but helped the club to the promotion play-offs. He then scored crucial goals in the 89th and 90th minutes of their Play Off semi-final tie with Wolves after coming off the bench with 17 minutes left. Palace went on to win promotion in the Wembley Play Off final, beating Sheffield United 1–0. Freedman's experience of Premier League football in the 1997–98 season proved short-lived though as he only managed seven top flight games before being sold to Wolves.

=== Wolverhampton Wanderers ===
Freedman joined Wolves, initially on loan, in October 1997. After impressing with two goals in as many games, Wolves quickly made his contract permanent in a £800,000 combined deal with Palace defender Kevin Muscat. However, Freedman's time at Wolves only lasted until the end of the 1997–98 season. He was the team's top goalscorer with 13 in total in a season that saw Wolves fail to mount a serious promotion challenge. The emergence of striker Robbie Keane during the season helped convince Wolves to sell Freedman.

=== Nottingham Forest ===
In August 1998 Freedman signed for newly promoted Premier League side Nottingham Forest for a fee of £900,000. He made his first appearance for Forest on 17 August 1998 as a substitute in a 2–1 defeat at Arsenal. In his first full campaign in the top flight in 1998–99 he scored 9 league goals for Forest who were relegated that season to Division One. In his second season at Forest in 1999–2000, the club languished in mid-table under manager David Platt. Freedman made a total of 81 appearances, and scoring 23 goals, before being sold to Crystal Palace in October 2000.

=== Return to Crystal Palace ===
Freedman rejoined Palace in October 2000 for a transfer fee of £600,000. He rejoined the club during a relegation threatened campaign, but one which ended with perhaps his most famous goal for the club. Relegation to the third tier loomed in their final game of the season at Stockport County, with three minutes left and no score. Freedman then scored the vital goal that kept Palace in the division and relegated Huddersfield Town.

The following season saw Freedman bag 21 goals in all competitions, his best seasonal tally for Palace. This also earned him a call-up to the Scotland national team, to add to his earlier Under 21 caps. However, the next season was less of a personal success as he was dropped from the Scotland side, and began to find his appearances limited at Palace, as manager Trevor Francis largely preferred Ade Akinbiyi, Dele Adebola, and Andy Johnson to him.

His fortunes were revived in 2003–04 though, as he re-established himself as a first choice regular under new manager Iain Dowie. A strong surge in the second half of the season saw the club go from relegation contenders to the promotion play-offs. Freedman scored during the penalty shootout victory at Sunderland in the semi-finals to help the club to the final. He was an unused substitute in the final though, which saw the club beat West Ham, the second time he had been promoted with the club.

However, life in the Premier League in 2004–05 saw Freedman often overlooked as the team employed only one striker in most games, with Johnson being the preferred choice in this role. Despite attracting interest from Leeds United midway through the season, he remained committed to the Palace cause of consolidating Premier League status by rejecting a loan bid from the Championship contenders. He stayed to score his only top flight goal for the club in their vital final fixture at Charlton Athletic, drawing them level at 1–1. However, the eventual 2–2 result saw the club endure a record fourth Premier League relegation.

Back in the Championship, he remained down the pecking order behind England international Johnson and Republic of Ireland international Clinton Morrison. However, injuries to Johnson and Jon Macken, and lack of form from Morrison brought him back into the team and he scored his 100th and 101st goals for Crystal Palace in a 3–2 win at rivals Brighton & Hove Albion on 20 November 2005. This made him only the seventh player in Palace history to have reached the century mark.

He managed to stay in the line-up after Johnson's return, having made a great impression on Palace boss Iain Dowie, who, later, made a public call to Scotland boss Walter Smith for the striker to be given another chance in the national side. He ended the season with six league goals, as the club comfortably reached the play-offs. However, they were beaten by Watford in their semi final tie to deny him a chance of a third promotion.

The appointment of Peter Taylor as manager in Summer 2006 limited Freedman's chances, and he could only manage three league goals. However, he extended his contract by a further two years at the conclusion of the season. Taylor was replaced by Neil Warnock early in the 2007–08 season, but strong goalscoring form of Clinton Morrison limited Freedman to rare substitute appearances.

With Morrison keeping him out of the Palace side, Freedman, after initially rejecting the move (as he had done during the 2004–05 season), decided to move to League One club Leeds United on loan until the end of the season.

=== Leeds United ===
He was in excellent form for the Elland Road club, scoring five goals to ensure a play-off place including a brace against Carlisle United in a 3–2 win at Elland Road and also receiving praise from Leeds manager Gary McAllister. This form earned him League One's "Player of the Month" award for April, while another vital late play-off goal in the first leg of Leeds' semi-final tie with Carlisle United and an assist for a last minute Jonny Howson goal in the second leg helped the Whites to Wembley, where he featured in the play-off final on the day of his 34th birthday, as Leeds were downed 1–0 by Doncaster Rovers. After the season ended, Freedman revealed that he wanted to join Leeds permanently, however Leeds signed Luciano Becchio and Freedman had to look elsewhere.

Freedman is held in high regard by the Leeds United's supporters despite a short spell at the club; his impact in helping the team to the playoff final and his impressive interviews during his time at Leeds are remembered.

=== Southend United ===
After returning to Palace at the end of the season, Freedman was granted a testimonial match to reward him for 10 years' service at the club over two spells, with the match to be a first-team pre-season friendly fixture against Fulham at Selhurst Park which ended in a 0–0 draw. Following this match, Warnock allowed Freedman to depart Selhurst. He was heavily linked with a permanent move to Leeds, however this never materialised.

Instead Freedman moved to Southend United on a free transfer, scoring four goals in his first four outings for the Shrimpers. However his first season was plagued by injury. The following season saw the form of Lee Barnard keep Freedman out of the side.

In March 2010, Freedman had his contract at Southend terminated by mutual consent to rejoin Palace as part of the coaching staff, signalling the end of his playing career.

== International career ==
Freedman played for the Scotland under-21 team in the mid-1990s. Scotland manager Craig Brown considered selecting Freedman for the full national side in 1996, when main striker Kevin Gallacher was injured. Freedman made his Scotland debut on 6 October 2001, in a 2002 World Cup qualifying match against Latvia at Hampden Park. The Scots won the match 2–1, with Freedman scoring the equalising goal. It was scored by a header past then Crystal Palace teammate, goalkeeper Aleksandrs Koliņko, and came after another Palace teammate, Andrejs Rubins, had given Latvia a 1–0 lead. Despite this victory, Scotland failed to gain a place in the World Cup. Craig Brown resigned after the match and was replaced as Scotland manager by Berti Vogts. Freedman only earned one more Scotland cap following Vogts' appointment, playing the first 45 minutes of a 5–0 defeat by France in a March 2002 friendly.

== Managerial career and Sporting Directorship ==
=== Crystal Palace ===
Freedman's coaching career began when he was appointed as the reserve team manager of Crystal Palace in November 2005. He was in this role alongside his playing duties for the club's first team. This role ended when he joined Leeds United on loan the following March. Following his move to Southend United, he began coaching alongside playing for the Shrimpers' first team.

After his retirement from his playing duties, in March 2010, Freedman returned to Crystal Palace, now as the assistant manager to Paul Hart, with John Pemberton as first team coach. At this time, Palace were in administration, with the new coaching staff's task being to avoid relegation from the Championship, which was achieved on the final day of the season. When George Burley was appointed as Palace's new manager to succeed Hart, Freedman was retained to act as his assistant manager.

Burley was dismissed on 1 January 2011, resulting in Freedman being appointed caretaker manager. Palace's first-choice to replace Burley was AFC Bournemouth manager Eddie Howe, though he was appointed as manager at Burnley, with Freedman being made permanent manager of Palace, signing a two-and-a-half-year deal. He quickly moved to bring in Lennie Lawrence as his assistant and former Palace teammate Tony Popovic as first team coach.

He was ultimately successful in guiding Crystal Palace out of the relegation zone, with the club achieving safety with a game to spare. Palace began the 2011–12 season well under their new manager, occupying the playoff places at the end of October and also enjoying a good run in the Football League Cup, where they knocked out Manchester United 2–1 at Old Trafford with goals from Darren Ambrose and Glenn Murray. Crystal Palace ended the season in 17th place. They made a strong start to the 2012–13 season.

=== Bolton Wanderers ===
On 23 October 2012, Crystal Palace released a statement announcing "that first team manager Dougie Freedman has joined Bolton Wanderers." At the time Bolton, in 16th place in the Championship, were 12 places below Crystal Palace in 4th. Bolton confirmed the appointment on 25 October. His first match in charge of Bolton finished in a 2–1 win over Cardiff City. His first signing as Bolton manager was that of Norwich City midfielder Jacob Butterfield on a month-long loan.

Throughout November, Freedman's first full month in charge, his new team remained undefeated, the first time they had achieved this for two years. He continued to lead Bolton Wanderers to five consecutive wins (last done in 2006) in the late push for promotion, taking the club from 20th to 7th position in the Championship. Bolton narrowly missed out on qualifying for the play-offs on the final day of the season, whereas Crystal Palace made it into the play-offs and ultimately ended up winning the play offs and being promoted. After guiding Bolton to a late push for the play-offs, Freedman won the Football League Championship Manager of the Month award for April 2013. The 2013–14 season was less successful as Bolton were inconsistent and finished in 14th, their first win not coming until October.

The 2014–15 season started similarly, Bolton failed to win any of their first 6 games and only one of the first ten. Freedman left the club on 3 October 2014 by mutual consent.

=== Nottingham Forest ===
On 1 February 2015, Freedman was appointed as manager of Nottingham Forest, following the dismissal of Stuart Pearce. After a positive start to his tenure, on 16 April 2015 it was confirmed that Freedman had signed a new contract to keep him at the City Ground for a further two years. Forest finished 14th for the 2014–15 season. Following only three wins in 22 games, Freedman's position at Forest came under threat, with former Forest player Nigel Clough being linked to replacing Freedman as manager. However, following wins against Reading, Fulham and MK Dons, plus away draws against Wolves and Blackburn in November and December 2015, Freedman's position stabilised, even more so when Clough was appointed manager of Burton Albion in December. Freedman went on to lead Forest to a 13-game unbeaten run. This ended on 30 January 2016 with a 1–0 defeat to Watford in the fourth round of the FA Cup. Forest subsequently lost form, managing only one win in six games. Following a 3–0 defeat to Sheffield Wednesday at the City Ground on 12 March 2016, in which eight Forest players were unable to play because of injury, Freedman was dismissed the following day.

=== Return to Crystal Palace ===
On 21 August 2017, Freedman returned to Crystal Palace as the club's sporting director. In the summer of 2021, Freedman played a significant role in helping bring former Arsenal captain Patrick Vieira to Crystal Palace as their manager. He also secured the loan signing of Conor Gallagher from Chelsea as well as permanent deals for centre-back Marc Guehi and winger Michael Olise. In 2024, Freedman oversaw the hiring of Oliver Glasner as manager, and in 2025, Crystal Palace won the FA Cup as the first major trophy in the club's history, qualifying them for the Europa League for the first time. Freedman ultimately departed the club in 2025.

=== Al-Diriyah Club ===
In March 2025, Freedman accepted a role to become the sporting director of second-tier side Al–Diriyah in Saudi Arabia. In addition to his directorship role, Freedman will also take on a multi-sports purpose role which includes overseeing recruitment of Al–Diriyah.

== Career statistics ==
=== Club ===
Appearances and goals by club, season and competition
Club	Season	League			FA Cup		League Cup		Other		Total	
Club	Season	Division	Apps	Goals	Apps	Goals	Apps	Goals	Apps	Goals	Apps	Goals
Barnet	1994–95	Third Division	42	24	2	0	4	5	2	0	50	29
Barnet	1995–96	Third Division	5	3	―		2	0	0	0	7	3
Barnet	Total		47	27	0	0	2	0	0	0	49	27
Crystal Palace	1995–96	First Division	39	20	2	0	―		3 (Note: Appearances in First Division/Championship play-offs)	0	44	20
Crystal Palace	1996–97	First Division	44	11	1	0	3	1	2	2	50	14
Crystal Palace	1997–98	Premier League	7	0	―		2	0	―		9	0
Crystal Palace	Total		90	31	3	0	5	1	5	2	103	34
Wolverhampton Wanderers	1997–98	First Division	29	10	6	2	―		―		35	12
Nottingham Forest	1998–99	Premier League	31	9	1	0	4	3	―		36	12
Nottingham Forest	1999–2000	First Division	34	9	3	1	4	1	―		41	11
Nottingham Forest	2000–01	First Division	5	0	―		1	0	―		6	0
Nottingham Forest	Total		70	18	4	1	9	4	―		83	23
Crystal Palace	2000–01	First Division	26	11	2	0	―		―		28	11
Crystal Palace	2001–02	First Division	40	20	0	0	2	1	―		42	21
Crystal Palace	2002–03	First Division	29	9	2	0	3	2	―		34	11
Crystal Palace	2003–04	First Division	35	13	1	0	3	2	1	0	40	15
Crystal Palace	2004–05	Premier League	20	1	0	0	3	2	―		23	3
Crystal Palace	2005–06	Championship	34	6	3	1	2	1	2	0	41	8
Crystal Palace	2006–07	Championship	34	3	2	0	1	0	―		37	3
Crystal Palace	2007–08	Championship	19	1	0	0	1	1	―		20	2
Crystal Palace	Total		237	64	10	1	15	9	3	0	265	74
Leeds United (loan)	2007–08	League One	11	5	―		―		3 (Note: Appearances in League One play-offs)	1	14	6
Southend United	2008–09	League One	16	5	2	0	0	0	0	0	18	5
Southend United	2009–10	League One	20	1	1	0	1	0	1 (Note: Appearance in Football League Trophy)	0	23	1
Southend United	Total		36	6	3	0	1	0	1	0	41	6
Career total			520	161	26	4	32	14	12	3	590	182

=== International ===
Scores and results list Scotland's goal tally first, score column indicates score after each Freedman goal.

List of international goals scored by Dougie Freedman
No.	Date	Venue	Opponent	Score	Result	Competition
1	6 October 2001	Hampden Park, Glasgow, Scotland	Latvia	1–1	2–1	2002 FIFA World Cup qualification

== Managerial statistics ==
As of match played 12 March 2016

Managerial record by team and tenure
Team	Nat	From	To	Record							
Team	Nat	From	To	G	W	D	L	GF	GA	GD	Win %
Crystal Palace	(England)	2 January 2011	23 October 2012	90	32	27	31	100	107	−7	35.56
Bolton Wanderers	(England)	25 October 2012	3 October 2014	99	34	32	33	134	132	+2	34.34
Nottingham Forest	(England)	2 February 2015	13 March 2016	57	19	16	22	71	68	+3	33.33
Total				246	85	75	86	305	307	−2	34.55

== Honours ==
=== As a player ===
Crystal Palace

- Football League First Division play-offs: 1997, 2004

Individual

- Barnet Player of the Year: 1994–95
- PFA Team of the Year: 1994–95 Third Division, 2001–02 First Division
- Crystal Palace Player of the Year: 2001–02
- Football League First Division Player of the Month: August 2003
- Football League One Player of the Month: April 2008

=== As a manager ===
Individual

- Football League Championship Manager of the Month: September 2012, April 2013
