= Alan Smith (football manager) =

English football manager (born 1946)

Personal information
- Date of birth: 28 December 1946 (age 79)

Managerial career
- Years: Team
- 1977–1981: Dulwich Hamlet
- 1993–1995: Crystal Palace
- 1995–1996: Wycombe Wanderers
- 2000–2001: Crystal Palace

Alan Smith (born 28 December 1946) is an English former football manager, who has managed Dulwich Hamlet, Crystal Palace and Wycombe Wanderers.

== Management career ==
=== Wimbledon ===
Smith began his coaching career in non-league football with Wimbledon He was appointed Reserve Team Coach to Allen Batsford in the 1975–76 season before they entered the Football League.

=== Dulwich Hamlet ===
In 1977 Smith moved to take the role as Manager of Dulwich Hamlet, who had just been relegated from the Isthmian League. In his first season they were promoted back to the Premier Division as Champions finishing 4th in the 1978–79 season and 3rd in the 1979–80 season. At the end of the 1980–1981 season having finished 15th Smith resigned due to business commitments, but during this period had also been appointed Joint Manager of the Isthmian League Representative Team.

=== Crystal Palace ===
Smith was then appointed by Alan Mullery, the then Crystal Palace Manager, in 1983–84 as Youth/Reserve Team Coach and continued in this role throughout Steve Coppell’s era from 1984 until he was made Assistant Manager in 1989.

When Coppell resigned following relegation from the Premier League in 1993 Smith was appointed Manager and achieved instant success at Selhurst Park as his team won the Division One Championship and he was awarded the League Manager's Association ‘Championship Manager of the Year’.

In Smith's first year in the Premier League Palace reached both Semi Finals of the Domestic Cup competitions losing to Liverpool and Manchester United after a replay. Unfortunately for Palace and Smith they were relegated on the final day of the season as the Premier League reduced the size of the Division and four teams were relegated with Palace going down on a record 48 points, the highest number ever recorded by a team being relegated. Smith was sacked a few days later.

=== Wycombe Wanderers ===
Smith was not out of work for long. He accepted an offer from Wycombe Wanderers to succeed Martin O'Neill as manager, but was sacked in September 1996 after a terrible start to the 1996–97 Division Two campaign, alienating himself from the Chairboys' fanbase in the process with what were perceived to be negative long-ball tactics.

=== Fulham and Crystal Palace (second spell) ===
One of Kevin Keegan’s first appointments on joining Fulham was to employ Smith as the club's new Academy Director, a role he held from 1997 to 2000. Smith resigned this position in the summer of 2000 to again replace Steve Coppell as Manager of Crystal Palace under new Chairman Simon Jordan.

Palace reached the 2000–01 Worthington Cup semi-finals, but Smith was sacked in April with relegation looking imminent. Survival was achieved against all odds by caretaker manager Steve Kember.

Smith was not employed in football for eight years after his dismissal from Palace in April 2001.

=== Middlesbrough ===
Smith joined Middlesbrough as a Football Consultant in July 2009. He joined the club to help Middlesbrough manager Gareth Southgate, who played under Smith during his time at Crystal Palace, with their bid to return to the Premier League following relegation. Southgate and Chairman Steve Gibson discussed the matter in detail before the appointment, which saw Smith take a behind-the-scenes role, rather than being involved on the training pitch or in the dressing room.

On 20 October 2009, Gareth Southgate was sacked by Middlesbrough; it is noted that Smith also left the club, but it is unclear whether he was sacked or just decided to leave.

== Qualifications ==
Smith was in the first batch of coaches in England to be awarded the FA Advanced Coaching Licence (UEFA ‘A’ Award). He also has the unique qualification for a Football Manager of having been appointed a Fellow of the Royal Institute of Chartered Surveyors having qualified in the 1970s.

== Other Sporting Activities ==
Smith continued passing on his coaching and business advice forming a company in 2004 with Alec Stewart, the England and Surrey Cricketer, which dealt with sponsorship and advertising for sporting clients and companies.

== Managerial Statistics (excluding Non-League Football) ==
As of 28 December 2011

| Team | From | To | Record | | | | |
| Team | From | To | Games | Won | Drawn | Lost | Win % |
|---|---|---|---|---|---|---|---|
| Crystal Palace | 3 June 1993 | 15 May 1995 | 108 | 48 | 25 | 35 | 44.44 |
| Wycombe Wanderers | 29 June 1995 | 31 July 1996 | 52 | 16 | 17 | 19 | 30.77 |
| Crystal Palace | 1 August 2000 | 29 April 2001 | 55 | 14 | 18 | 23 | 25.45 |
| Total | | | 215 | 78 | 60 | 77 | 36.28 |

== Honours ==
Crystal Palace

- Football League First Division: 1993–94

Individual

- Football League First Division Manager of the Month: April 1994
- League Manager's Association ‘Championship Manager of the Year’: 1994
