= 1992–93 Tottenham Hotspur F.C. season =

English football club season

Tottenham Hotspur
1992–93 season
- Chairman: Alan Sugar
- Joint managers: Doug Livermore and Ray Clemence
- Stadium: White Hart Lane
- Premier League: 8th
- FA Cup: Semi-finals
- League Cup: Fourth round
- Top goalscorer: League: Sheringham (21); All: Sheringham (28)
- Average home league attendance: 27,740
| Home colours | Away colours | Third colours |

The 1992–93 season was the 111th season in the history of Tottenham Hotspur Football Club, and their 15th consecutive season in the top flight of English football in the inaugural season of the FA Premier League. The club also participated in the FA Cup and the Football League Cup.

== Season summary ==
The 1992–93 season saw Peter Shreeves sacked as head coach and replaced by joint head coaches Doug Livermore and Ray Clemence. Spurs became founder members of the new Premier League, created by the Football Association as a replacement for the Football League First Division as the highest division of English football. To coincide with the massive changes in English Football, Tottenham made a number of major signings. They paid a club record £2.1million for Nottingham Forest striker Teddy Sheringham, £750,000 for Southampton defender Neil Ruddock and £1.75million for Portsmouth's highly rated 19-year-old winger Darren Anderton. In the first ever Premier League season, Spurs finished eighth, with Teddy Sheringham being the division's top scorer with 22 goals, 21 for Tottenham Hotspur and 1 for Nottingham Forest, and also reached the FA Cup semi-final, losing 1–0 to Arsenal.

== Squad ==
=== First-team squad ===
Note: Flags indicate national team as defined under FIFA eligibility rules; some limited exceptions apply. Players may hold more than one non-FIFA nationality.

| Pos. | Nation | Player |
|---|---|---|
| GK | ENG | Chris Day |
| GK | ENG | Kevin Dearden |
| GK | NOR | Erik Thorstvedt |
| GK | ENG | Ian Walker |
| DF | ENG | Dean Austin |
| DF | ISL | Guðni Bergsson |
| DF | ENG | Sol Campbell |
| DF | ENG | Jason Cundy |
| DF | ENG | Justin Edinburgh |
| DF | ENG | Terry Fenwick |
| DF | ENG | Ian Hendon |
| DF | ENG | Lee Hodges |
| DF | ENG | Gary Mabbutt (captain) |
| DF | IRL | David McDonald |
| DF | ENG | Stuart Nethercott |
| DF | ENG | Neil Ruddock |
| DF | ENG | Dave Tuttle |
| DF | WAL | Pat Van Den Hauwe |
| DF | ENG | Neil Young |
| MF | ENG | Paul Allen |

| Pos. | Nation | Player |
|---|---|---|
| MF | ENG | Darren Anderton |
| MF | ENG | Nick Barmby |
| MF | ENG | Darren Caskey |
| MF | ENG | Andy Gray |
| MF | ENG | Danny Hill |
| MF | ENG | Scott Houghton |
| MF | ENG | David Howells |
| MF | NIR | Gerry McMahon |
| MF | ENG | Jeff Minton |
| MF | ESP | Nayim |
| MF | NIR | Steve Robinson |
| MF | ENG | Vinny Samways |
| MF | ENG | Steve Sedgley |
| MF | IRL | Andy Turner |
| MF | ENG | Kevin Watson |
| FW | ENG | Peter Beadle |
| FW | SCO | Gordon Durie |
| FW | SCO | John Hendry |
| FW | ENG | Paul Moran |
| FW | ENG | Teddy Sheringham |

== Transfers ==
=== Loans out ===
| Date from | Position | Nationality | Player | To | Date until |
|---|---|---|---|---|---|
| 6 August 1992 | GK | (England) | Kevin Dearden | (England) Portsmouth | 31 May 1993 |
| 23 December 1992 | MF | (England) | Andy Gray | (England) Swindon Town | 31 May 1993 |
| 21 January 1993 | DF | (England) | David Tuttle | (England) Peterborough United | 31 May 1993 |
| 1 February 1993 | DF | (England) | Ian Hendon | (England) Barnsley | 1 May 1993 |
| 26 February 1993 | MF | (England) | Lee Hodges | (England) Plymouth Argyle | 31 May 1993 |
| 1 March 1993 | FW | (Scotland) | John Hendry | (England) Charlton Athletic | 30 June 1993 |
| 25 March 1993 | FW | (England) | Peter Beadle | (England) AFC Bournemouth | 31 May 1993 |

=== Transfers in ===
| Date from | Position | Nationality | Player | From | Fee | Ref. |
|---|---|---|---|---|---|---|
| July 1992 | MF | (Northern Ireland) | Gerry McMahon | (Northern Ireland) Glenavon | £100,000 | |
| 1 July 1992 | MF | (England) | Darren Anderton | (England) Portsmouth | £1,750,000 | |
| 1 July 1992 | DF | (England) | Dean Austin | (England) Southend | £375,000 | |
| 2 July 1992 | DF | (England) | Jason Cundy | (England) Chelsea | £850,000 | |
| 29 July 1992 | DF | (England) | Neil Ruddock | (England) Southampton | £750,000 | |
| 28 August 1992 | FW | (England) | Teddy Sheringham | (England) Nottingham Forest | £2,100,000 | |

=== Transfers out ===
| Date from | Position | Nationality | Player | To | Fee | Ref. |
|---|---|---|---|---|---|---|
| 1 July 1992 | MF | (England) | Paul Gascoigne | (Italy) Lazio | £5,500,000 | |
| 1 July 1992 | FW | (England) | Gary Lineker | (Japan) Nagoya Grampus 8 | £2,000,000 | |
| 1 July 1992 | FW | (England) | Paul Walsh | (England) Portsmouth | £400,000 | |
| 29 July 1992 | FW | (England) | Paul Stewart | (England) Liverpool | £2,300,000 | |

== Pre-season and friendlies ==
=== Pre-season ===
| 20 July 1992 Friendly | Tottenham Hotspur (England) | 3–1 | (England) Reading | Barnet |
| | Anderton; Hendry (pen.); Stewart | | Goal | Stadium: Chase Lodge |

| 21 July 1992 Friendly | Tottenham Hotspur (England) | 2–0 | (England) Gillingham | Barnet |
| | Turner; Allen | | | Stadium: Chase Lodge |

| 25 July 1992 Friendly | Heart of Midlothian (Scotland) | 1–2 | (England) Tottenham Hotspur | Edinburgh, Scotland |
| | Levein | | Durie (pen.) | Stadium: Tynecastle Stadium; Attendance: 7,018 |

| 29 July 1992 Friendly | Brighton & Hove Albion (England) | 1–1 | (England) Tottenham Hotspur | Hove |
| | Goal | | Samways | Stadium: Goldstone Ground; Attendance: 4,877 |

| 1 August 1992 Friendly | Glenavon (Northern Ireland) | 0–1 | (England) Tottenham Hotspur | Lurgan, Northern Ireland |
| | | | Samways | Stadium: Mourneview Park; Attendance: 4,500 |

| 3 August 1992 Friendly | West Bromwich Albion (England) | 0–2 | (England) Tottenham Hotspur | West Bromwich |
| | | | Hendry; Nayim | Stadium: The Hawthorns; Attendance: 8,078 |

| 5 August 1992 Friendly | Sunderland (England) | 0–3 | (England) Tottenham Hotspur | Sunderland |
| | | | Anderton (pen.) | Stadium: Roker Park; Attendance: 22,672 |

| 8 August 1992 Friendly | Watford (England) | 0–1 | (England) Tottenham Hotspur | Watford |
| | | | Ruddock | Stadium: Vicarage Road; Attendance: 5,567 |
Note: Nigel Gibbs Testimonial

| 10 August 1992 Friendly | Portsmouth (England) | 4–2 | (England) Tottenham Hotspur | Portsmouth |
| | Goal | | Samways | Stadium: Fratton Park; Attendance: 10,929 |

=== Mid-season ===
==== Capital Cup ====
| 23 September 1992 First leg | Lazio (Italy) | 3–0 | (England) Tottenham Hotspur | Rome, Italy |
| | Gascoigne 11'; Stroppa 58'; Neri 88' | | | Stadium: Stadio Olimpico; Attendance: 23,650 |

| 20 October 1992 Second leg | Tottenham Hotspur (England) | 0–2 | (Italy) Lazio | Tottenham |
| 19:45 BST | | Report | Stroppa; Signori | Stadium: White Hart Lane; Attendance: 11,112; Referee: Tony Ward |

| 10 November 1992 Friendly | Swansea City (Wales) | 3–3 | (England) Tottenham Hotspur | Swansea, Wales |
| | Goal | | (o.g.); Nayim; Cundy | Stadium: Vetch Field; Attendance: 3,527 |

| 28 March 1993 Friendly | Crystal Palace (England) | 3–3 | (England) Tottenham Hotspur | Selhurst |
| 12:00 BST | Goal | | Nayim; Ruddock; Barmby | Stadium: Selhurst Park; Attendance: 1,607; Referee: Ray Lewis |
Note: Malcolm Allison's Testimonial match

| 23 April 1993 Friendly | Real Zaragoza (Spain) | 2–0 | (England) Tottenham Hotspur | Zaragoza, Spain |
| | Goal | | | Stadium: La Romareda; Attendance: 30,000 |

==== Fiorucci Trophy ====
| 27 April 1993 First round | Tottenham Hotspur (England) | 0–1 | (Spain) Real Madrid | Tottenham |
| | | | Esnáider 25' | Stadium: White Hart Lane; Attendance: 7,651 |

| 27 April 1993 Second round | Tottenham Hotspur (England) | 0–0 (5–6 p) | (Italy) Inter Milan | Tottenham |
| | | | | Stadium: White Hart Lane; Attendance: 7,651 |

=== Postseason ===
| 14 May 1993 Friendly | Enfield (England) | 1–5 | (England) Tottenham Hotspur | Enfield |
| | Goal | | Sheringham; (o.g.); Anderton; Gray | Stadium: Southbury Road |
Note: Eddie Baily's Testimonial match

== Competitions ==
=== Overview ===
| Competition | First match | Last match | Starting round | Final position | Record | | | | | | | |
| Competition | First match | Last match | Starting round | Final position | Pld | W | D | L | GF | GA | GD | Win % |
|---|---|---|---|---|---|---|---|---|---|---|---|---|
| FA Premier League | 15 August 1992 | 11 May 1993 | Matchday 1 | 8th | 42 | 16 | 11 | 15 | 60 | 66 | −6 | 38.10 |
| FA Cup | 2 January 1993 | 4 April 1993 | Third round | Semi-finals | 5 | 4 | 0 | 1 | 14 | 6 | +8 | 80.00 |
| League Cup | 21 September 1992 | 2 December 1992 | Second round | Fourth round | 4 | 3 | 0 | 1 | 8 | 5 | +3 | 75.00 |
| Total | | | | | 51 | 23 | 11 | 17 | 82 | 77 | +5 | 45.10 |

Source: Competitions

=== FA Premier League ===
==== League table ====
| Pos | Team | Pld | W | D | L | GF | GA | GD | Pts | Qualification or relegation |
|---|---|---|---|---|---|---|---|---|---|---|
| 6 | Liverpool | 42 | 16 | 11 | 15 | 62 | 55 | +7 | 59 | |
| 7 | Sheffield Wednesday | 42 | 15 | 14 | 13 | 55 | 51 | +4 | 59 | |
| 8 | Tottenham Hotspur | 42 | 16 | 11 | 15 | 60 | 66 | −6 | 59 | |
| 9 | Manchester City | 42 | 15 | 12 | 15 | 56 | 51 | +5 | 57 | |
| 10 | Arsenal | 42 | 15 | 11 | 16 | 40 | 38 | +2 | 56 | Qualification for the Cup Winners' Cup first round (Note: Arsenal qualified by winning the FA Cup and therefore did not take up their UEFA Cup spot for winning the League Cup, which reverted to the league.) |

Source: Premier League
Rules for classification: 1) points; 2) goal difference; 3) number of goals scored.

==== Results summary ====
| Overall | | | | | | | | Home | | | | | | Away | | | | | |
| Pld | W | D | L | GF | GA | GD | Pts | W | D | L | GF | GA | GD | W | D | L | GF | GA | GD |
|---|---|---|---|---|---|---|---|---|---|---|---|---|---|---|---|---|---|---|---|
| 42 | 16 | 11 | 15 | 60 | 66 | −6 | 59 | 11 | 5 | 5 | 40 | 25 | +15 | 5 | 6 | 10 | 20 | 41 | −21 |

==== Results by round ====
| Round | 1 | 2 | 3 | 4 | 5 | 6 | 7 | 8 | 9 | 10 | 11 | 12 | 13 | 14 | 15 | 16 | 17 | 18 | 19 | 20 | 21 | 22 | 23 | 24 | 25 | 26 | 27 | 28 | 29 | 30 | 31 | 32 | 33 | 34 | 35 | 36 | 37 | 38 | 39 | 40 | 41 | 42 |
|---|---|---|---|---|---|---|---|---|---|---|---|---|---|---|---|---|---|---|---|---|---|---|---|---|---|---|---|---|---|---|---|---|---|---|---|---|---|---|---|---|---|---|
| Ground | A | H | H | A | A | H | H | A | H | A | A | H | A | H | A | H | A | H | H | A | A | H | A | H | H | A | H | A | H | H | A | A | A | H | H | A | H | A | H | H | A | A |
| Result | D | L | D | L | D | W | W | L | D | L | L | D | D | W | W | D | W | L | W | L | D | W | L | L | L | W | W | W | W | W | L | D | D | W | W | L | W | L | D | L | L | W |
| Position | 16 | 19 | 18 | 21 | 21 | 18 | 15 | 16 | 15 | 17 | 19 | 19 | 18 | 17 | 15 | 15 | 12 | 14 | 13 | 13 | 13 | 12 | 13 | 14 | 15 | 14 | 13 | 10 | 10 | 10 | 10 | 9 | 10 | 14 | 15 | 10 | 7 | 6 | 7 | 7 | 7 | 8 |
| Points | 1 | 1 | 2 | 2 | 3 | 6 | 9 | 9 | 10 | 10 | 10 | 11 | 12 | 15 | 18 | 19 | 22 | 22 | 25 | 25 | 26 | 29 | 29 | 29 | 29 | 32 | 35 | 38 | 41 | 44 | 44 | 45 | 46 | 49 | 52 | 52 | 55 | 55 | 56 | 56 | 56 | 59 |

A = Away; H = Home; W = Win; D = Draw; L = Loss

==== Matches ====
| 15 August 1992 1 | Southampton | 0–0 | Tottenham Hotspur | Southampton |
| | | | Ruddock (yellow card); Samways (yellow card) | Stadium: The Dell; Attendance: 19,654; Referee: Vic Callow |

| 19 August 1992 2 | Tottenham Hotspur | 0–2 | Coventry City | Tottenham |
| | Durie (yellow card) | | Williams 4', 29' | Stadium: White Hart Lane; Attendance: 24,388; Referee: Dermot Gallagher |

| 22 August 1992 3 | Tottenham Hotspur | 2–2 | Crystal Palace | Tottenham |
| | Durie 16'; Sedgley 88'; Allen (yellow card); Samways (yellow card); Ruddock (yellow card) (yellow-red card) 50' | | McGoldrick 21'; Young 80'; Thorn (yellow card) (yellow-red card) 50'; Thomas (yellow card) | Stadium: White Hart Lane; Attendance: 25,237; Referee: Philip Don |

| 25 August 1992 4 | Leeds United | 5–0 | Tottenham Hotspur | Leeds |
| | Wallace 19'; Cantona 26', 31', 46'; Chapman 66' | | | Stadium: Elland Road; Attendance: 28,218; Referee: Mike Reed |

| 30 August 1992 5 | Ipswich Town | 1–1 | Tottenham Hotspur | Ipswich |
| | Wark 45'; Whelan (yellow card); Linighan (yellow card) | | Cundy 29' | Stadium: Portman Road; Attendance: 20,100; Referee: Keith Hackett |

| 2 September 1992 6 | Tottenham Hotspur | 2–0 | Sheffield United | Tottenham |
| | Sheringham 43'; Durie 46'; Ruddock (yellow card) | | Tracey (yellow card); Hodges (yellow card) (yellow-red card) 84' | Stadium: White Hart Lane; Attendance: 21,322; Referee: Ian Mitchell |

| 5 September 1992 7 | Tottenham Hotspur | 2–1 | Everton | Tottenham |
| | Gray (yellow card) 17'; Allen 79'; Turner 90' | | Beardsley 42'; Horne (yellow card) 84' | Stadium: White Hart Lane; Attendance: 26,503; Referee: Robert Hart |

| 14 September 1992 8 | Coventry City | 1–0 | Tottenham Hotspur | Coventry |
| | Williams 61', (yellow card); Atherton (yellow card) | | | Stadium: Highfield Road; Attendance: 15,348; Referee: Martin Bodenham |

| 19 September 1992 9 | Tottenham Hotspur | 1–1 | Manchester United | Tottenham |
| | Durie 52', (yellow card) | | Giggs 45'; Bruce (yellow card) | Stadium: White Hart Lane; Attendance: 33,296; Referee: Ron Groves |

| 27 September 1992 10 | Sheffield Wednesday | 2–0 | Tottenham Hotspur | Sheffield |
| | Bright 6'; Anderson 32'; Shirtliff (yellow card) | | Sedgley (yellow card) | Stadium: Hillsborough Stadium; Attendance: 24,895; Referee: Mike Peck |

| 3 October 1992 11 | Queens Park Rangers | 4–1 | Tottenham Hotspur | Shepherd's Bush |
| 15:00 BST | Holloway 52'; Wilkins 59'; Penrice 67', 79' | | Sheringham 28'; Samways (yellow card); Cundy (yellow card) | Stadium: Loftus Road; Attendance: 19,845; Referee: Joe Worrall |

| 17 October 1992 12 | Tottenham Hotspur | 2–2 | Middlesbrough | Tottenham |
| | Sheringham 70' (pen.); Barmby 73' | | Mustoe 1'; Ruddock 32' (o.g.) | Stadium: White Hart Lane; Attendance: 24,735; Referee: Paul Durkin |

| 25 October 1992 13 | Wimbledon | 1–1 | Tottenham Hotspur | Selhurst |
| | Gibson 38'; Jones (yellow card) | | Barmby 48'; Ruddock (yellow card) | Stadium: Selhurst Park; Attendance: 8,628; Referee: Allan Gunn |

| 31 October 1992 14 | Tottenham Hotspur | 2–0 | Liverpool | Tottenham |
| | Nayim 63'; Ruddock 72'; Austin (yellow card) | | Walters (yellow card); Piechnik (yellow card); Hutchison (yellow card) | Stadium: White Hart Lane; Attendance: 32,917; Referee: Gerald Ashby |

| 7 November 1992 15 | Blackburn Rovers | 0–2 | Tottenham Hotspur | Blackburn |
| | Sherwood (yellow card) | | Howells 67'; Sheringham 81' (pen.) | Stadium: Ewood Park; Attendance: 17,305; Referee: Keren Barratt |

| 21 November 1992 16 | Tottenham Hotspur | 0–0 | Aston Villa | Tottenham |
| | Ruddock (yellow card) | | Teale (yellow card) | Stadium: White Hart Lane; Attendance: 32,852; Referee: Jim Borrett |

| 28 November 1992 17 | Manchester City | 0–1 | Tottenham Hotspur | Manchester |
| | | | Phelan 77' (o.g.); Samways (yellow card) | Stadium: Maine Road; Attendance: 25,496; Referee: David Allison |

| 5 December 1992 18 | Tottenham Hotspur | 1–2 | Chelsea | Tottenham |
| 15:00 GMT | Campbell 88' | | Newton 76', 85' | Stadium: White Hart Lane; Attendance: 31,540; Referee: Roger Dilkes |

| 12 December 1992 19 | Tottenham Hotspur | 1–0 | Arsenal | Tottenham |
| | Allen 20'; Ruddock (yellow card); Durie (yellow card) | | Adams (yellow card); Jensen (yellow card); Bould (yellow card) | Stadium: White Hart Lane; Attendance: 33,707; Referee: Alf Buksh |

| 19 December 1992 20 | Oldham Athletic | 2–1 | Tottenham Hotspur | Oldham |
| | Sharp 29'; Olney 90' | | Sheringham 61'; Edinburgh (yellow card) | Stadium: Boundary Park; Attendance: 11,735; Referee: Roger Milford |

| 26 December 1992 21 | Norwich City | 0–0 | Tottenham Hotspur | Norwich |
| | | | Austin (yellow card); Samways (yellow card) | Stadium: Carrow Road; Attendance: 19,413; Referee: John Martin |

| 28 December 1992 22 | Tottenham Hotspur | 2–1 | Nottingham Forest | Tottenham |
| | Barmby 35'; Mabbutt 85' | | Gemmill 73' | Stadium: White Hart Lane; Attendance: 32,118; Referee: Mike Reed |

| 9 January 1993 23 | Manchester United | 4–1 | Tottenham Hotspur | Manchester |
| | Cantona 40'; Irwin 52'; McClair 38'; Parker 58' | | Barmby 88' | Stadium: Old Trafford; Attendance: 35,648; Referee: Mike Peck |

| 16 January 1993 24 | Tottenham Hotspur | 0–2 | Sheffield Wednesday | Tottenham |
| | | | Bright 54'; Hirst 88' | Stadium: White Hart Lane; Attendance: 25,702; Referee: Kelvin Morton |

| 27 January 1993 25 | Tottenham Hotspur | 0–2 | Ipswich Town | Tottenham |
| 19:45 GMT | Austin (yellow card); Edinburgh (yellow card); Howells (yellow card) | | Yalop 47'; Genchev 79'; Bozinoski (yellow card); Dozzell (yellow card) | Stadium: White Hart Lane; Attendance: 23,738; Referee: Stephen Lodge |

| 30 January 1993 26 | Crystal Palace | 1–3 | Tottenham Hotspur | Selhurst |
| | Ruddock 54' (o.g.); Thorn (yellow card) | | Sheringham 15', 30'; Gray 25', (yellow card) | Stadium: Selhurst Park; Attendance: 20,937; Referee: David Elleray |

| 7 February 1993 27 | Tottenham Hotspur | 4–2 | Southampton | Tottenham |
| | Sheringham 55', 60'; Barmby 57'; Anderton 58' | | Dowie 22'; Benali (red card) 63'; Hall 66'; Hurlock (yellow card) 72' | Stadium: White Hart Lane; Attendance: 20,089; Referee: Ken Redfern |

| 10 February 1993 28 | Everton | 1–2 | Tottenham Hotspur | Liverpool |
| | Sansom 29' | | Mabbutt 26'; Allen 69'; Ruddock (yellow card) | Stadium: Goodison Park; Attendance: 16,164; Referee: Keren Barratt |

| 20 February 1993 29 | Tottenham Hotspur | 4–0 | Leeds United | Tottenham |
| | Sheringham 8', 37', 67'; Ruddock 48' | | Rocastle (yellow card) | Stadium: White Hart Lane; Attendance: 32,040; Referee: Gerald Ashby |

| 27 February 1993 30 | Tottenham Hotspur | 3–2 | Queens Park Rangers | Tottenham |
| | Sheringham 8', 34'; Anderton 61'; Austin (yellow card) | | Peacock 87'; White 88'; McDonald (yellow card) | Stadium: White Hart Lane; Attendance: 32,341; Referee: David Elleray |

| 2 March 1993 31 | Sheffield United | 6–0 | Tottenham Hotspur | Sheffield |
| | Carr 13'; Gray 21' (o.g.); Bryson 28', 29'; Deane 73', (yellow card); Rogers 87' | | Van Den Hauwe (yellow card) | Stadium: Bramall Lane; Attendance: 16,654; Referee: Joe Worrall |

| 10 March 1993 32 | Aston Villa | 0–0 | Tottenham Hotspur | Birmingham |
| | | | Sedgley (yellow card) | Stadium: Villa Park; Attendance: 37,727; Referee: Keith Hackett |

| 20 March 1993 33 | Chelsea | 1–1 | Tottenham Hotspur | Fulham |
| 15:00 GMT | Wise (yellow card) 35'; Cascarino 52' | | Sheringham 31' (pen.); Gray (yellow card) 32'; Nethercott (yellow card) 68' | Stadium: Stamford Bridge; Attendance: 25,157; Referee: Roger Dilkes |

| 24 March 1993 34 | Tottenham Hotspur | 3–1 | Manchester City | Tottenham |
| | Anderton 23'; Nayim 43'; Turner 87'; Van Den Hauwe (yellow card) | | Sheron 60'; Curle (yellow card); Phelan (yellow card) | Stadium: White Hart Lane; Attendance: 27,247; Referee: John Martin |

| 9 April 1993 35 | Tottenham Hotspur | 5–1 | Norwich City | Tottenham |
| | Ruddock 27'; Sheringham 30', 77'; Barmby 55'; Nayim 83'; Allen (yellow card) | | Ekoku 86'; Goss (yellow card); Sutton (yellow card) | Stadium: White Hart Lane; Attendance: 31,425; Referee: Keren Barratt |

| 12 April 1993 36 | Nottingham Forest | 2–1 | Tottenham Hotspur | Nottingham |
| | Black 25'; Rosario 35'; Stone (yellow card); Keane (yellow card) | | Sedgley 44'; Ruddock (yellow card); Sheringham (yellow card) | Stadium: City Ground; Attendance: 25,682; Referee: Alan Wilkie |

| 17 April 1993 37 | Tottenham Hotspur | 4–1 | Oldham Athletic | Tottenham |
| | Sheringham 58' (pen.), 82' (pen.); Anderton 70'; Turner 84' | | Beckford 25'; Halle (yellow card); Milligan (yellow card) | Stadium: White Hart Lane; Attendance: 26,663; Referee: Keith Hackett |

| 20 April 1993 38 | Middlesbrough | 3–0 | Tottenham Hotspur | Middlesbrough |
| | Wright 2', 26'; Wilkinson 76' | | Austin (yellow card) | Stadium: Ayresome Park; Attendance: 14,472; Referee: David Allison |

| 1 May 1993 39 | Tottenham Hotspur | 1–1 | Wimbledon | Tottenham |
| | Anderton 39' | | Earle 64'; McAllister (red card) 74'; Holdsworth (yellow card) | Stadium: White Hart Lane; Attendance: 24,473; Referee: Ray Lewis |

| 5 May 1993 40 | Tottenham Hotspur | 1–2 | Blackburn Rovers | Tottenham |
| | Anderton 86' | | Newell 22', 54'; Wilcox (yellow card); Dobson (yellow card) | Stadium: White Hart Lane; Attendance: 23,097; Referee: Kelvin Morton |

| 8 May 1993 41 | Liverpool | 6–2 | Tottenham Hotspur | Liverpool |
| | Rush 21', 88'; Barnes 44', 88'; Harkness 48'; Walters 82'; Jones (yellow card) | | Sheringham 46'; Sedgley 78'; Van Den Hauwe (yellow card) | Stadium: Anfield; Attendance: 43,385; Referee: Stephen Lodge |

| 11 May 1993 42 | Arsenal | 1–3 | Tottenham Hotspur | Holloway |
| 19:45 BST | Dickov 52' | | Sheringham 39'; Hendry 46', 78', (yellow card); Ruddock (yellow card); McDonald (yellow card) | Stadium: Highbury; Attendance: 26,393; Referee: Keith Burge |

=== FA Cup ===
| 2 January 1993 Third round | Tottenham Hotspur | 5–1 | Marlow | Tottenham |
| | Sheringham 20'; Barmby 41', 90'; Samways 50', 71' | | Lay | Stadium: White Hart Lane; Attendance: 26,636; Referee: Keith Burge |

| 24 January 1993 Fourth round | Norwich City | 0–2 | Tottenham Hotspur | Norwich |
| | | | Sheringham 48', 51' | Stadium: Carrow Road; Attendance: 15,003; Referee: Roger Dilkes |

| 14 February 1993 Fifth round | Tottenham Hotspur | 3–2 | Wimbledon | Tottenham |
| | Anderton 26'; Sheringham 44'; Barmby 45+2' | | Dobbs 64'; Cotterill 90+2' | Stadium: White Hart Lane; Attendance: 26,594; Referee: Martin Bodenham |

| 7 March 1993 Quarter-finals | Manchester City | 2–4 | Tottenham Hotspur | Manchester |
| | Sheron 10'; Phelan 87' | | Nayim 25', 48', 85'; Sedgley 44' | Stadium: Maine Road; Attendance: 34,050; Referee: Ray Lewis |

| 4 April 1993 Semi-finals | Arsenal | 1–0 | Tottenham Hotspur | Wembley |
| 12:00 BST | Adams 80'; Linighan (yellow card) 41'; Dixon (yellow card) 45+1' (yellow-red card) 86' | | Allen (yellow card) 31'; Nayim (yellow card) 45+1'; Sheringham (yellow card) 82' | Stadium: Wembley Stadium; Attendance: 76,263; Referee: Philip Don |

=== League Cup ===
| 21 September 1992 Second round First leg | Tottenham Hotspur | 3–1 | Brentford | Tottenham |
| 19:45 BST | Sheringham 41'; Watson 61'; Durie 73' | | Blissett 56' | Stadium: White Hart Lane; Attendance: 19,365; Referee: John Martin |

| 7 October 1992 Second round Second leg | Brentford | 2–4 (3–7 agg.) | Tottenham Hotspur | Brentford |
| 19:45 BST | Blissett 21'; Millen 85' | | Anderton 3'; Turner 51'; Sheringham (pen.) | Stadium: Griffin Park; Attendance: 11,445 |

| 28 October 1992 Third round | Manchester City | 0–1 | Tottenham Hotspur | Manchester |
| | | | Samways 40' | Stadium: Maine Road; Attendance: 18,399; Referee: John Key |

| 2 December 1992 Fourth round | Nottingham Forest | 2–0 | Tottenham Hotspur | Nottingham |
| | Woan 29'; Keane 65'; Keane (yellow card); Chettle (yellow card); Pearce (yellow card) | | Sheringham (yellow card); Durie (yellow card); Nayim (yellow card); Edinburgh (yellow card) | Stadium: City Ground; Attendance: 22,312 |

== Statistics ==
=== Appearances ===
Last updated: 26 July 2020.

| Pos. | Name | FA Premier League | | FA Cup | | League Cup | | Total | |
| Pos. | Name | Apps | Goals | Apps | Goals | Apps | Goals | Apps | Goals |
Goalkeepers
| GK | (England) Kevin Dearden | 0+1 | 0 | 0 | 0 | 0 | 0 | 0+1 | 0 |
| GK | (Norway) Erik Thorstvedt | 25+2 | 0 | 5 | 0 | 2 | 0 | 32+2 | 0 |
| GK | (England) Ian Walker | 17 | 0 | 0 | 0 | 2 | 0 | 19 | 0 |
Defenders
| DF | (England) Dean Austin | 33+1 | 0 | 5 | 0 | 2+1 | 0 | 40+2 | 0 |
| DF | (Iceland) Guðni Bergsson | 0+5 | 0 | 0+1 | 0 | 0 | 0 | 0+6 | 0 |
| DF | (England) Sol Campbell | 0+1 | 1 | 0 | 0 | 0 | 0 | 0+1 | 1 |
| DF | (England) Jason Cundy | 13+2 | 1 | 0 | 0 | 2 | 0 | 15+2 | 1 |
| DF | (England) Justin Edinburgh | 31+1 | 0 | 5 | 0 | 3+1 | 0 | 39+2 | 0 |
| DF | (England) Terry Fenwick | 3+2 | 0 | 0 | 0 | 0 | 0 | 3+2 | 0 |
| DF | (England) Lee Hodges | 0+4 | 0 | 0 | 0 | 0 | 0 | 0+4 | 0 |
| DF | (England) Gary Mabbutt | 29 | 2 | 5 | 0 | 2 | 0 | 36 | 2 |
| DF | (Republic of Ireland) David McDonald | 2 | 0 | 0 | 0 | 0 | 0 | 2 | 0 |
| DF | (England) Stuart Nethercott | 3+2 | 0 | 0 | 0 | 0 | 0 | 3+2 | 0 |
| DF | (England) Neil Ruddock | 38 | 3 | 5 | 0 | 4 | 0 | 47 | 3 |
| DF | (England) Dave Tuttle | 4+1 | 0 | 0 | 0 | 2 | 0 | 6+1 | 0 |
| DF | (Wales) Pat Van Den Hauwe | 13+5 | 0 | 0 | 0 | 2 | 0 | 15+5 | 0 |
Midfielders
| MF | (England) Paul Allen | 38 | 3 | 5 | 0 | 4 | 0 | 47 | 3 |
| MF | (England) Darren Anderton | 32+2 | 6 | 4+1 | 1 | 2 | 1 | 38+3 | 8 |
| MF | (England) Nick Barmby | 17+5 | 6 | 3+1 | 3 | 2+1 | 0 | 22+7 | 9 |
| MF | (England) Andy Gray | 9+8 | 1 | 0 | 0 | 0 | 0 | 9+8 | 1 |
| MF | (England) Danny Hill | 2+2 | 0 | 0 | 0 | 0 | 0 | 2+2 | 0 |
| MF | (England) David Howells | 16+2 | 1 | 2+1 | 0 | 0+1 | 0 | 18+4 | 1 |
| MF | (England) Jeff Minton | 0 | 0 | 0 | 0 | 0+1 | 0 | 0+1 | 0 |
| MF | (Spain) Nayim | 15+3 | 3 | 3 | 3 | 2 | 0 | 20+3 | 6 |
| MF | (England) Vinny Samways | 34 | 0 | 5 | 2 | 3 | 1 | 42 | 3 |
| MF | (England) Steve Sedgley | 20+2 | 3 | 2 | 1 | 3 | 0 | 25+2 | 4 |
| MF | (Republic of Ireland) Andy Turner | 7+11 | 3 | 0+1 | 0 | 0+2 | 1 | 7+14 | 4 |
| MF | (England) Kevin Watson | 4+1 | 0 | 0+1 | 0 | 1+1 | 1 | 5+3 | 1 |
Forwards
| FW | (Scotland) Gordon Durie | 17 | 3 | 1 | 0 | 2 | 1 | 20 | 4 |
| FW | (Scotland) John Hendry | 2+3 | 2 | 0 | 0 | 0 | 0 | 2+3 | 2 |
| FW | (England) Paul Moran | 0+3 | 0 | 0 | 0 | 0 | 0 | 0+3 | 0 |
| FW | (England) Teddy Sheringham | 38 | 21 | 5 | 4 | 4 | 3 | 47 | 28 |

Last updated: 15 May 1999

=== Goal scorers ===
Last updated: 26 July 2020.

| Rnk | Pos | Player | FA Premier League | FA Cup | EFL Cup | Total |
|---|---|---|---|---|---|---|
| 1 | FW | (England) Teddy Sheringham | 21 | 4 | 3 | 28 |
| 2 | MF | (England) Nick Barmby | 6 | 3 | 0 | 9 |
| 3 | MF | (England) Darren Anderton | 6 | 1 | 1 | 8 |
| 4 | MF | (Spain) Nayim | 3 | 3 | 0 | 6 |
| 5 | FW | (Scotland) Gordon Durie | 3 | 0 | 1 | 4 |
| 5 | MF | (England) Steve Sedgley | 3 | 1 | 0 | 4 |
| 5 | MF | (Republic of Ireland) Andy Turner | 3 | 0 | 1 | 4 |
| 8 | MF | (England) Paul Allen | 3 | 0 | 0 | 3 |
| 8 | DF | (England) Neil Ruddock | 3 | 0 | 0 | 3 |
| 8 | MF | (England) Vinny Samways | 0 | 2 | 1 | 3 |
| 11 | FW | (Scotland) John Hendry | 2 | 0 | 0 | 2 |
| 11 | DF | (England) Gary Mabbutt | 2 | 0 | 0 | 2 |
| 13 | DF | (England) Sol Campbell | 1 | 0 | 0 | 1 |
| 13 | DF | (England) Jason Cundy | 1 | 0 | 0 | 1 |
| 13 | MF | (England) Andy Gray | 1 | 0 | 0 | 1 |
| 13 | MF | (England) David Howells | 1 | 0 | 0 | 1 |
| 13 | MF | (England) Kevin Watson | 0 | 0 | 1 | 1 |
| TOTALS | | | 59 | 14 | 8 | 81 |

=== Clean sheets ===
Last updated: 26 July 2020.

| Rnk | Player | FA Premier League | FA Cup | EFL Cup | Total |
|---|---|---|---|---|---|
| 1 | (Norway) Erik Thorstvedt | 10 | 1 | 1 | 12 |
| 2 | (England) Ian Walker | 2 | 0 | 0 | 2 |
| 3 | (England) Kevin Dearden | 1 | 0 | 0 | 1 |
| Total | | 13 | 1 | 1 | 15 |

== See also ==
- 1992–93 in English football
- List of Tottenham Hotspur F.C. seasons
