= 2000–01 Crystal Palace F.C. season =

English football club season

Crystal Palace
2000–01 season
- Chairman: Simon Jordan
- Manager: Alan Smith (until 29 April); Steve Kember (caretaker from 29 April)
- Stadium: Selhurst Park
- First Division: 21st
- FA Cup: Third round
- Worthington Cup: Semi-finals
- Top goalscorer: League: Morrison (14); All: Morrison (19)
- Average home league attendance: 17,061
Home colours	Away colours

During the 2000–01 English football season, Crystal Palace F.C. competed in the Football League First Division.

== Season summary ==
Singapore financer Jerry Lim purchased an almost bankrupt Crystal Palace in July 2000, and immediately sold the club to mobile phone tycoon and lifelong fan Simon Jordan who, following defeats to non-league sides in pre-season, replaced Coppell with Alan Smith – who had previously been manager from 1993 to 1995. The takeover solved Palace's financial problems, but their on-the-field form slumped and despite reaching the League Cup semi-finals, Smith was sacked in April 2001 with relegation to Division Two looking imminent. With two away games remaining, at Portsmouth and Stockport County, Palace were in 22nd place, three points behind Portsmouth (with an inferior goal difference and had played the same number of games), and five points behind Huddersfield (who had a superior goal difference but played a game more). Long serving coach Steve Kember was put in temporary charge of the first team alongside Terry Bullivant, and after making changes to the playing side, Palace travelled to Portsmouth and came away with a much needed 4–2 victory. When the last day of the season arrived, Palace were in 21st place, one goal better off than Portsmouth. With 87 minutes of the game at Stockport gone, the score was 0–0, a result that would have resulted in Palace's relegation, but Dougie Freedman burst into the Stockport County penalty area and lashed a shot past Stockport 'keeper Lee Jones into the back of the net, triggering the relegation of Huddersfield Town and saving Palace. The goal was controversial, as there had been a clear handball by Palace midfielder David Hopkin just moments before, which the referee had not awarded a free-kick for. Still, the Palace fans didn't care, and many of the 3,000 who had travelled poured onto Stockport's Edgeley Park pitch, celebrating with the players.

== Final league table ==
Pos	Team	Pld	W	D	L	GF	GA	GD	Pts	Qualification or relegation
19	Stockport County	46	11	18	17	58	65	−7	51	
20	Portsmouth	46	10	19	17	47	59	−12	49	
21	Crystal Palace	46	12	13	21	57	70	−13	49	
22	Huddersfield Town (R)	46	11	15	20	48	57	−9	48	Relegation to the Second Division
23	Queens Park Rangers (R)	46	7	19	20	45	75	−30	40	Relegation to the Second Division

Rules for classification: 1) Points; 2) Goal difference; 3) Goals scored
(R) Relegated

== Results ==
Crystal Palace's score comes first

=== Legend ===
Win	Draw	Loss

=== Football League First Division ===
Date	Opponent	Venue	Result	Attendance	Scorers
12 August 2000	Blackburn Rovers	A	0–2	18,733	
20 August 2000	Queens Park Rangers	H	1–1	19,020	Forssell
26 August 2000	Huddersfield Town	A	2–1	10,670	Gray, Ruddock
28 August 2000	Nottingham Forest	H	2–3	18,865	Black, Fan
3 September 2000	West Bromwich Albion	A	0–1	13,980	
9 September 2000	Burnley	H	0–1	18,531	
12 September 2000	Barnsley	H	1–0	16,297	Morrison
16 September 2000	Norwich City	A	0–0	16,828	
23 September 2000	Sheffield United	H	0–1	17,521	
30 September 2000	Preston North End	A	0–2	13,028	
14 October 2000	Birmingham City	A	1–2	17,191	Morrison
18 October 2000	Fulham	A	1–3	16,040	Ruddock
21 October 2000	Portsmouth	H	2–3	15,693	Black (2)
24 October 2000	Grimsby Town	H	0–1	16,685	
28 October 2000	Bolton Wanderers	A	3–3	12,879	Freedman (2), Morrison
4 November 2000	Sheffield Wednesday	H	4–1	15,333	Freedman, Morrison, Pollock (2)
11 November 2000	Wolverhampton Wanderers	A	3–1	17,658	Freedman, Morrison (2)
18 November 2000	Tranmere Rovers	H	3–2	14,221	Staunton, Pollock, Morrison
25 November 2000	Stockport County	H	2–2	18,819	Forssell (2)
2 December 2000	Grimsby Town	A	2–2	5,802	Forssell, Morrison
5 December 2000	Wimbledon	H	3–1	16,699	Forssell, Morrison (2)
9 December 2000	Watford	H	1–0	16,049	Morrison
16 December 2000	Crewe Alexandra	A	1–1	5,752	Freedman
22 December 2000	Blackburn Rovers	H	2–3	15,010	Forssell, Mullins
26 December 2000	Gillingham	A	1–4	10,518	Freedman (pen)
30 December 2000	Queens Park Rangers	H	1–1	14,439	Morrison
14 January 2001	Nottingham Forest	A	3–0	21,198	Forssell (2), Freedman
20 January 2001	Gillingham	H	2–2	18,823	Freedman, Forssell
3 February 2001	West Bromwich Albion	H	2–2	16,692	Forssell, Pollock
10 February 2001	Burnley	A	2–1	14,973	Forssell, Morrison
17 February 2001	Norwich City	H	1–1	16,417	Forssell
20 February 2001	Barnsley	A	0–1	12,909	
24 February 2001	Sheffield United	A	0–1	18,924	
3 March 2001	Preston North End	H	0–2	15,160	
6 March 2001	Birmingham City	H	1–2	13,987	Austin
10 March 2001	Wimbledon	A	0–1	13,167	
17 March 2001	Fulham	H	0–2	21,133	
31 March 2001	Crewe Alexandra	H	1–0	20,872	Austin
3 April 2001	Huddersfield Town	H	0–0	15,324	
7 April 2001	Watford	A	2–2	15,598	Austin (pen), Black
14 April 2001	Sheffield Wednesday	A	1–4	19,877	Morrison
16 April 2001	Bolton Wanderers	H	0–2	16,842	
21 April 2001	Tranmere Rovers	A	1–1	8,119	Hopkin
28 April 2001	Wolverhampton Wanderers	H	0–2	18,993	
2 May 2001	Portsmouth	A	4–2	19,013	Forssell, Riihilahti, Freedman (2)
6 May 2001	Stockport County	A	1–0	9,782	Freedman

=== FA Cup ===
Round	Date	Opponent	Venue	Result	Attendance	Goalscorers
R3	6 January 2001	Sunderland	A	0–0	30,908	
R3R	17 January 2001	Sunderland	H	2–4 (a.e.t.)	15,454	Morrison, Thomson

=== League Cup ===
Round	Date	Opponent	Venue	Result	Attendance	Goalscorers
R1 1st Leg	23 August 2000	Cardiff City	H	2–1	5,983	Morrison, Ruddock
R1 2nd Leg	5 September 2000	Cardiff City	A	0–0	4,904	
R2 1st Leg	19 September 2000	Burnley	A	2–2	5,889	Forssell, Black
R2 2nd Leg	26 September 2000	Burnley	H	1–1 (won on away goals)	5,720	Linighan
R3	1 November 2000	Leicester City	A	3–0	12,965	Morrison, Thomson, Rubins
R4	28 November 2000	Tranmere Rovers	H	0–0 (6–5 p)	10,271	
R5	19 December 2000	Sunderland	H	2–1	15,945	Forssell, Morrison
SF 1st Leg	10 January 2001	Liverpool	H	2–1	25,933	Rubins, Morrison
SF 2nd Leg	24 January 2001	Liverpool	A	0–5	41,854	

== Players ==
=== First-team squad ===
Squad at end of season

Note: Flags indicate national team as defined under FIFA eligibility rules; some limited exceptions apply. Players may hold more than one non-FIFA nationality.

No.	Pos.	Nation	Player
2	DF	ENG	Jamie Smith
3	DF	ENG	Matthew Upson (on loan from Arsenal)
4	DF	ENG	Dean Austin
5	MF	CHN	Fan Zhiyi
6	DF	ENG	Neil Ruddock
7	MF	ENG	Hayden Mullins
8	MF	ENG	Simon Rodger
9	FW	SCO	Dougie Freedman
10	FW	IRL	Clinton Morrison (Note: Morrison was born in Wandsworth, England, but also qualified to represent the Republic of Ireland internationally through his grandmother and would make his international debut for the Republic of Ireland in August 2001.)
11	MF	ENG	Tommy Black
12	MF	ENG	Julian Gray
13	GK	CAN	Hubert Busby
14	MF	SCO	Steven Thomson
15	FW	FIN	Mikael Forssell (on loan from Chelsea)
16	DF	ENG	Andy Frampton
17	FW	LVA	Andrejs Rubins
18	MF	NIR	Wayne Carlisle
19	DF	ENG	David Woozley
20	DF	ENG	Richard Harris

No.	Pos.	Nation	Player
21	GK	ENG	Matt Gregg
22	FW	WAL	Andy Martin
23	DF	WAL	Stephen Evans
24	DF	ENG	Jimmy Hibburt
25	MF	IRL	Stephen Hunt
26	DF	ENG	Sean Hankin
27	FW	ENG	Steve Kabba
28	FW	ENG	Roscoe Dsane
29	DF	ENG	Jonathan Boardman
30	FW	ENG	Chris Sharpling
31	DF	USA	Gregg Berhalter
32	MF	ENG	Jamie Pollock
33	DF	ENG	Craig Harrison
34	FW	JAM	Ricardo Fuller
35	GK	LVA	Aleksandrs Koliņko
37	DF	ENG	Richard Howell
38	MF	SCO	David Hopkin
39	DF	BEL	Kenny Verhoene
40	MF	FIN	Aki Riihilahti

=== Left club during season ===
Note: Flags indicate national team as defined under FIFA eligibility rules; some limited exceptions apply. Players may hold more than one non-FIFA nationality.

No.	Pos.	Nation	Player
1	GK	ENG	Stuart Taylor (on loan from Arsenal)
17	DF	ENG	Andy Linighan (to Oxford United)
34	FW	ENG	Paul Kitson (on loan from West Ham United)
9	FW	ENG	Leon McKenzie (to Peterborough United)
3	MF	SCO	Jamie Fullarton (to Dundee United)

No.	Pos.	Nation	Player
31	GK	WAL	Lee Kendall (to Cardiff City)
34	DF	IRL	Steve Staunton (on loan from Liverpool)
36	DF	SCO	Andy Morrison (on loan from Manchester City)
13	GK	ENG	Fraser Digby (Released)
36	DF	SVN	Amir Karić (on loan from Ipswich Town)
