= Andy Martin (disambiguation) =

Andy Martin (born 1945) is an American perennial candidate for political office.

Andy Martin may also refer to:

- Andy Martin (author), British author and academic
- Andy Martin (footballer, born 1896) (1896–1978), Scottish footballer for Blackpool, Halifax Town, Rochdale and Torquay United
- Andy Martin (footballer, born 1980), retired Welsh footballer
- Andy Martin (English musician), singer and lyricist
- Andy Martin (American musician) (born 1960), jazz trombonist
- Andy Martin (architect) (born 1945), Australian architect and designer
- Andy Martin (pentathlete) (1927–2003), British modern pentathlete

== See also ==
- Andrew Martin (disambiguation)
