= Andrew Martin =

Andrew Martin may refer to:

== Sports ==
- Andy Martin (footballer, born 1896) (1896–1978), Scottish footballer for Blackpool, Halifax Town, Rochdale and Torquay United
- Andy Martin (pentathlete) (1927–2003), British modern pentathlete
- Andrew Martin (cyclist) (born 1961), cyclist from Guam
- Test (wrestler) (Andrew James Robert Patrick Martin, 1975–2009), Canadian professional wrestler
- Andy Martin (footballer, born 1980), retired Welsh footballer
- Andrew Martin (javelin thrower) (born 1980), Australian Olympic athlete

== Politics ==
- Andrew Martin (Nevada politician) (born 1964), member of the Nevada Assembly
- Andrew Martin (Wisconsin politician), Wisconsin state assemblyman
- Andrew P. Martin, Arizona politician

== Other ==
- Andrew Martin (computer scientist), English computer scientist
- Andy Martin (American musician) (born 1960), jazz trombonist
- Andrew Martin (novelist) (born 1962), English novelist and journalist
- Andrew Martin (British Army officer) (1914–1993)
- Andrew Martin ("The Bicentennial Man"), the protagonist of Isaac Asimov's "The Bicentennial Man"
- Andrew D. Martin (born 1972), political scientist, chancellor of Washington University in St. Louis
- A. Frank Martin (1894–1982), American founder of Kappa Kappa Psi fraternity

== See also ==
- Andy Martin (disambiguation)
- Andrew Marton (1904–1992), Hungarian-American film director
- Andrew H. Martyn (1785–1847), Irish Roman Catholic priest and activist
