= Brian Linighan (footballer, born 1936) =

English footballer (1936–2004)

Personal information
- Full name: William Brian Linighan
- Date of birth: 17 May 1936
- Place of birth: Hartlepool, England
- Date of death: 24 May 2004 (aged 68)
- Place of death: Hartlepool, England
- Height: 5 ft 10 in (1.78 m)
- Position: Central defender

Senior career*
Years	Team	Apps	(Gls)
–1953	West Hartlepool St Joseph's		
1953–1959	Lincoln City	0	(0)
1956–1957	→ Oswestry Town (loan)		
1958	→ Darlington (loan)	1	(1)
1959–1961	Ashington		
1961–196?	Wingate Colliery Welfare		
196?–	Blackhall Colliery Welfare		
- * Club domestic league appearances and goals

William Brian Linighan (17 May 1936 – 24 May 2004) was an English professional footballer who played as a central defender. He started his senior career at Lincoln City, but never completed a senior appearance. He spent time on loan at Birmingham & District League club Oswestry Town in 1957–58 and at Football League Fourth Division club Darlington in 1958, for whom he scored on his only appearance in the Football League. The following year he signed for Ashington of the Midland League, where he spent two seasons before moving on to teams including Wingate Colliery Welfare and Blackhall Colliery Welfare.

== Personal life ==
William Brian Linighan was born on 17 May 1936 in Hartlepool, County Durham. He was married to Olwyn, and the couple had six children, five sons and a daughter. Three sons became professional footballers, all defenders: Andy and David each made nearly 600 appearances at Football League level, and Brian junior played briefly for Sheffield Wednesday and Bury before moving into non-League football. Linighan died in Hartlepool on 24 May 2004.

== Football career ==
Linighan played as a centre half for the St Joseph's club in West Hartlepool and represented Durham County at youth level. Together with fellow 17-year-old and Durham youth team-mate Tom Burlison, he joined Football League Second Division club Lincoln City on amateur forms in October 1953. Both turned professional in early December, moved up from the "A" team to the reserves, who played in the Midland League, and were retained at the end of the season.

Linighan began his National Service in the 64th Training Regiment Royal Artillery early in the 1955–56 season, which limited his availability for Lincoln, although he did play football for Services' teams. He returned to his club in November 1956 out of form, and a couple of weeks later he joined a Birmingham League club, Oswestry Town, on loan.

Linighan was a regular in Lincoln's Midland League team in 1957–58, chosen at right back as well as his usual centre half, and at the beginning of March 1958, when the club's shortage of forwards became acute, he was tried at centre forward for the reserves. He scored in each of his first two appearances in that position, and after the club were unable to complete the signings of two forwards from Leicester City in time for the Second Division match against Cardiff City on 8 March, he was selected at centre forward for the first team, set "the unenviable task of leading a line which has not been notable for its success in scoring goals." Lincoln were 3–0 down at half-time, but heavy snowfall forced the referee to abandon the match without resuming for the second half, so what would have been Linighan's Football League debut does not appear in the records.

In October 1958, Linighan signed for Football League Fourth Division club Darlington In October 1958, Linighan's home-town club, Hartlepools United of the Football League Fourth Division, were hoping to take the player on a free transfer, but the local newspaper expected "that Darlington would be prepared to top any offer Pools might make for the player". He duly signed for Darlington for what was described as a small fee, and made his Football League debut on 8 November away to Workington. With his new team 3–1 down, Linighan was switched from centre half to the forward line and scored a late equaliser in a 3–3 draw. He did not appear again, and returned to Lincoln "by agreement between the clubs" a few days later.

Linighan finally left Lincoln in February 1959 when he signed for Midland League club Ashington. He was still there in September 1961, and went on to play for Wingate Colliery Welfare and Blackhall Colliery Welfare.

== Sources ==
- Tweddle, Frank (2000). The Definitive Darlington F.C. Nottingham: SoccerData. ISBN 978-1-899468-15-7.
