= Brian Linighan =

English footballer

Personal information
- Date of birth: 2 November 1973 (age 52)
- Place of birth: Hartlepool, England
- Height: 1.86 m (6 ft 1 in)
- Position: Defender

Senior career*
Years	Team	Apps	(Gls)
1993–1998	Sheffield Wednesday	1	(0)
1998–2000	Bury	3	(0)
2000	Hallam	?	(?)
2000–2001	Gainsborough Trinity	?	(?)
2001–2003	Worksop Town	52	(7)
2003–2005	Whitby Town	61	(2)
2005–2006	Sunderland Nissan	?	(?)
- * Club domestic league appearances and goals

Brian Linighan (born 2 November 1973) is an English former professional footballer who played as a defender. He started his career at Sheffield Wednesday, making just one appearance on 11 January 1994 and was sold to Bury in 1998. After that, he played for non-league sides Gainsborough Trinity, Worksop Town and Whitby Town. He is the younger brother of former Arsenal defender Andy Linighan and former Ipswich Town defender David Linighan, and has a twin brother John. Their father, also named Brian Linighan, was himself a professional footballer.
