= 1992–93 FA Cup =

Tournament details
- Country: England; Wales

Final positions
- Champions: Arsenal (6th title)
- Runners-up: Sheffield Wednesday

Tournament statistics
- Top goal scorer(s): Ian Wright (10 goals)

The 1992–93 FA Cup was the 112th season of the FA Cup, also known as the Football Association Challenge Cup. It was won by Arsenal, who beat Sheffield Wednesday 2–1 in the replay after a 1–1 draw in the final at the old Wembley Stadium. The goals were scored by Ian Wright and Andy Linighan, who scored in the 119th minute. This was the last FA Cup final to be decided by a replay before final replays were abolished in 1999.

== Qualifying rounds ==
Most participating clubs that were not members of the Premier League or Football League competed in the qualifying rounds to secure one of 28 places available in the first round.

The winners from the fourth qualifying round were Southport, Gateshead, Blyth Spartans, Macclesfield Town, Altrincham, Marine, Accrington Stanley, Stafford Rangers, Nuneaton Borough, Kettering Town, Dagenham & Redbridge, Aylesbury United, VS Rugby, Sutton Coldfield Town, Kidderminster Harriers, St Albans City, Hayes, Solihull Borough, Kingstonian, Yeovil Town, Slough Town, Bath City, Cheltenham Town, Marlow, Dorking, Salisbury, Merthyr Tydfil and Sutton United.

Appearing in the competition proper for the first time were Solihull Borough, Dorking and the recently amalgamated Dagenham & Redbridge. Additionally, the reconstituted Accrington Stanley qualified for the first round for the first time since the former club of that name's mid-season resignation from the Football League in 1962. Of the others, Blyth Spartans had not featured at this stage since 1981-82; Gateshead, Sutton Coldfield Town and St Albans City had not done so since 1980-81, Salisbury had not done so since 1979-80 and Kingstonian had not done so since 1933-34.

Marine enjoyed a successful run through seven rounds of the competition. They defeated Emley, Heanor Town, Nantwich Town and Runcorn to secure their place in the main draw, and then accounted for Halifax Town and Stafford Rangers before going out to Crewe Alexandra at Gresty Road in the third round.

== First round proper ==
Birmingham City and Peterborough United from the Football League First Division entered in this round along with the 47 Second and Third Division teams, the 28 non-league clubs from the qualifying rounds and Witton Albion, Wycombe Wanderers and Woking who were given byes. Maidstone United was included in the draw despite the club withdrawing from the Third Division just after the start of the season without having played a match; their eventual Cup opponents Swansea City were awarded a walkover to the second round. Blyth Spartans, from the Northern League at Step 8 of English football, was the lowest-ranked team in the draw.

The first round matches were played on the weekend beginning 14 November 1992.

Tie no	Home team	Score	Away team
1	Blackpool	1–1	Rochdale
replay	Rochdale	1–0	Blackpool
2	Chester City	1–1	Altrincham (5)
replay	Altrincham	2–0	Chester City
3	Darlington	1–2	Hull City
4	AFC Bournemouth	0–0	Barnet
replay	Barnet	1–2	AFC Bournemouth
5	Burnley	2–1	Scarborough
6	Bury	2–0	Witton Albion (5)
7	Sutton United (6)	1–2	Hereford United
8	Marine (6)	4–1	Halifax Town
9	Reading	1–0	Birmingham City
10	Woking (5)	3–2	Nuneaton Borough (7)
11	Gillingham	3–2	Kettering Town (5)
12	Marlow (6)	3–3	Salisbury (7)
replay	Salisbury	2–2	Marlow
Marlow won 4–3 on penalties
13	Bolton Wanderers	2–1	Sutton Coldfield Town (7)
14	Macclesfield Town (5)	0–0	Chesterfield
replay	Chesterfield	2–2	Macclesfield Town
Macclesfield Town won 3–2 on penalties
15	Crewe Alexandra	6–1	Wrexham
16	West Bromwich Albion	8–0	Aylesbury United (6)
17	Lincoln City	0–0	Stafford Rangers (5)
replay	Stafford Rangers	2–1	Lincoln City
18	Shrewsbury Town	3–1	Mansfield Town
19	Doncaster Rovers	1–2	Hartlepool United
20	Wycombe Wanderers (5)	3–1	Merthyr Tydfil (5)
21	Northampton Town	3–1	Fulham
22	Brighton & Hove Albion	2–0	Hayes (6)
23	Bradford City	1–1	Preston North End
replay	Preston North End	4–5	Bradford City
24	Exeter City	1–0	Kidderminster Harriers (5)
25	St Albans City (6)	1–2	Cheltenham Town (6)
26	Scunthorpe United	0–0	Huddersfield Town
replay	Huddersfield Town	2–1	Scunthorpe United
27	Blyth Spartans (8)	1–2	Southport (6)
28	Cardiff City	2–3	Bath City (5)
29	Kingstonian (6)	1–1	Peterborough United
replay	Peterborough United	9v1	Kingstonian
replay	Peterborough United	1–0	Kingstonian
30	Torquay United	2–5	Yeovil Town (5)
31	York City	1–3	Stockport County
32	Stoke City	0–0	Port Vale
replay	Port Vale	3–1	Stoke City
33	Rotherham United	4–0	Walsall
34	Wigan Athletic	3–1	Carlisle United
35	Colchester United	4–0	Slough Town (5)
36	Swansea City	w/o	Maidstone United
37	Accrington Stanley (6)	3–2	Gateshead (5)
38	Dorking (7)	2–3	Plymouth Argyle
39	Solihull Borough (6)	2–2	VS Rugby (6)
replay	VS Rugby	2–1	Solihull Borough
40	Dagenham & Redbridge (5)	4–5	Leyton Orient

== Second round proper ==
The second round matches were played on the weekend beginning 5 December 1992. The round included six teams from the various competitions at Step 6 of the football pyramid: Marine, Cheltenham Town, Accrington Stanley, VS Rugby, Marlow and Southport.

Tie no	Home team	Score	Away team
1	Bath City (5)	2–2	Northampton Town
replay	Northampton Town	3–0	Bath City
2	Burnley	1–1	Shrewsbury Town
replay	Shrewsbury Town	1–2	Burnley
3	Yeovil Town (5)	0–0	Hereford United
replay	Hereford United	1–2	Yeovil Town
4	Marine (6)	3–2	Stafford Rangers (5)
5	Reading	3–0	Leyton Orient
6	Gillingham	1–1	Colchester United
replay	Colchester United	2–3	Gillingham
7	Bolton Wanderers	4–0	Rochdale
8	Macclesfield Town (5)	0–2	Stockport County
9	Wycombe Wanderers (5)	2–2	West Bromwich Albion
replay	West Bromwich Albion	1–0	Wycombe Wanderers
10	Brighton & Hove Albion	1–1	Woking (5)
replay	Woking	1–2	Brighton & Hove Albion
11	Plymouth Argyle	3–2	Peterborough United
12	Bradford City	0–2	Huddersfield Town
13	Altrincham (5)	1–4	Port Vale
14	Exeter City	2–5	Swansea City
15	Cheltenham Town (6)	1–1	AFC Bournemouth
replay	AFC Bournemouth	3–0	Cheltenham Town
16	Rotherham United	1–0	Hull City
17	Wigan Athletic	1–1	Bury
replay	Bury	1–0	Wigan Athletic
18	Accrington Stanley (6)	1–6	Crewe Alexandra
19	VS Rugby (6)	0–0	Marlow (6)
replay	Marlow	2–0	VS Rugby
20	Hartlepool United	4–0	Southport (6)

== Third round proper ==
Teams from the Premier League and First Division (except Birmingham City and Peterborough United) entered in this round. The third round matches were played on the weekend beginning 2 January 1993.

Marine, from the Northern Premier League Premier Division, and Marlow, from the Isthmian League Premier Division, were again the lowest-ranked teams in the round. Along with Yeovil Town from the Football Conference, they were also the last non-league clubs in the competition.

Tie no	Home team	Score	Away team
1	Watford (2)	1–4	Wolverhampton Wanderers (2)
2	Yeovil Town (5)	1–3	Arsenal (1)
3	Gillingham (4)	0–0	Huddersfield Town (3)
replay	Huddersfield Town	2–1	Gillingham
4	Leicester City (2)	2–2	Barnsley (2)
replay	Barnsley	1–1	Leicester City
Barnsley won 5–4 on penalties
5	Notts County (2)	0–2	Sunderland (2)
6	Nottingham Forest (1)	2–1	Southampton (1)
7	Blackburn Rovers (1)	3–1	AFC Bournemouth (3)
8	Aston Villa (1)	1–1	Bristol Rovers (2)
replay	Bristol Rovers	0–3	Aston Villa
9	Bolton Wanderers (3)	2–2	Liverpool (1)
replay	Liverpool	0–2	Bolton Wanderers
10	Crewe Alexandra (4)	3–1	Marine (6)
11	Middlesbrough (1)	2–1	Chelsea (1)
12	West Bromwich Albion (3)	0–2	West Ham United (2)
13	Derby County (2)	2–1	Stockport County (3)
14	Luton Town (2)	2–0	Bristol City (2)
15	Sheffield United (1)	2–2	Burnley (3)
replay	Burnley	2–4	Sheffield United
16	Ipswich Town (1)	3–1	Plymouth Argyle (3)
17	Newcastle United (2)	4–0	Port Vale (3)
18	Marlow (6)	1–5	Tottenham Hotspur (1)
19	Manchester City (1)	1–1	Reading (3)
replay	Reading	0–4	Manchester City
20	Queens Park Rangers (1)	3–0	Swindon Town (2)
21	Brentford (2)	0–2	Grimsby Town (2)
22	Northampton Town (4)	0–1	Rotherham United (3)
23	Brighton & Hove Albion (3)	1–0	Portsmouth (2)
24	Manchester United (1)	2–0	Bury (4)
25	Norwich City (1)	1–0	Coventry City (1)
26	Oldham Athletic (1)	2–2	Tranmere Rovers (2)
replay	Tranmere Rovers	3–0	Oldham Athletic
27	Wimbledon (1)	0–0	Everton (1)
replay	Everton	1–2	Wimbledon
28	Southend United (2)	1–0	Millwall (2)
29	Leeds United (1)	1–1	Charlton Athletic (2)
replay	Charlton Athletic	1–3	Leeds United
30	Cambridge United (2)	1–2	Sheffield Wednesday (1)
31	Swansea City (3)	1–1	Oxford United (2)
replay	Oxford United	2–2	Swansea City
Swansea City won 5–4 on penalties
32	Hartlepool United (3)	1–0	Crystal Palace (1)

== Fourth round proper ==
The fourth round matches were played on the weekend beginning 23 January 1993. Third Division Crewe Alexandra was the lowest-ranked club in the draw.

Tie no	Home team	Score	Away team
1	Nottingham Forest	1–1	Middlesbrough
replay	Middlesbrough	0–3	Nottingham Forest
2	Aston Villa	1–1	Wimbledon
replay	Wimbledon	0–0	Aston Villa
Wimbledon won 6–5 on penalties
3	Sheffield Wednesday	1–0	Sunderland
4	Wolverhampton Wanderers	0–2	Bolton Wanderers
5	Crewe Alexandra	0–3	Blackburn Rovers
6	Luton Town	1–5	Derby County
7	Sheffield United	1–0	Hartlepool United
8	Tranmere Rovers	1–2	Ipswich Town
9	Queens Park Rangers	1–2	Manchester City
10	Barnsley	4–1	West Ham United
11	Manchester United	1–0	Brighton & Hove Albion
12	Norwich City	0–2	Tottenham Hotspur
13	Huddersfield Town	1–2	Southend United
14	Arsenal	2–2	Leeds United
replay	Leeds United	2–3	Arsenal
15	Rotherham United	1–1	Newcastle United
replay	Newcastle United	2–0	Rotherham United
16	Swansea City	0–0	Grimsby Town
replay	Grimsby Town	2–0	Swansea City

== Fifth round proper ==
The fifth round matches were played on the weekend beginning 13 February 1993. Bolton Wanderers, from the Second Division, was the lowest-ranked team in the round and the last club from the First Round left in the competition.

Tie no	Home team	Score	Away team
1	Blackburn Rovers	1–0	Newcastle United
2	Sheffield Wednesday	2–0	Southend United
3	Derby County	3–1	Bolton Wanderers
4	Sheffield United	2–1	Manchester United
5	Ipswich Town	4–0	Grimsby Town
6	Tottenham Hotspur	3–2	Wimbledon
7	Manchester City	2–0	Barnsley
8	Arsenal	2–0	Nottingham Forest

== Sixth round proper ==
The sixth round matches were played on the weekend beginning 6 March 1993.

Blackburn Rovers, Premier League title contenders, lost on penalties to Premier League relegation battlers Sheffield United to end their double hopes, while Sheffield Wednesday moved closer to a second domestic cup final in the same season by triumphing at Derby County.

Arsenal defeated Ipswich Town 4–2 at Portman Road to move closer to a second domestic cup final and their first FA Cup triumph since 1979.

Tottenham Hotspur beat Manchester City 4–2 at Maine Road to book a North London derby with Arsenal in the semi-final. The match was suspended during the second half when a pitch invasion took place.

Tie no	Home team	Score	Away team
1	Blackburn Rovers	0–0	Sheffield United
replay	Sheffield United	2–2	Blackburn Rovers
Sheffield United won 5–3 on penalties
2	Derby County	3–3	Sheffield Wednesday
replay	Sheffield Wednesday	1–0	Derby County
3	Ipswich Town	2–4	Arsenal
4	Manchester City	2–4	Tottenham Hotspur

== Semi-finals ==
The semi-final matches were played on the weekend beginning 3 April 1993.

Both semi-finals were derby matches, with Sheffield Wednesday and Sheffield United contesting the Steel City derby – which Wednesday won 2–1 – and Arsenal defeating Tottenham 1–0 in the North London derby.

3 April 1993

Sheffield Wednesday	2–1 (a.e.t.)	Sheffield United
Waddle 2'; Bright 108'		Cork 44'

Wembley Stadium, London
Attendance: 75,364
Referee: Kelvin Morton (Bury St. Edmunds)

Sheffield Wednesday advance to the FA Cup Final

4 April 1993

Arsenal	1–0	Tottenham Hotspur
Adams 80'

Wembley Stadium, London
Attendance: 76,263
Referee: Philip Don (Hanworth Park, Middlesex)

Arsenal advance to the FA Cup Final

== Final ==
The first final was held on 15 May at Wembley Stadium and finished 1–1, after extra time, with Arsenal winning the replay on 20 May, 2–1 also after extra-time. This made Arsenal the first side to win the FA Cup and League Cup in the same season, just weeks after they had beaten Sheffield Wednesday 2–1 in the League Cup final.

15 May 1993
15:00 BST

Arsenal	1–1 (a.e.t.)	Sheffield Wednesday
Wright 20'		Hirst 61'

Wembley, London
Attendance: 79,347
Referee: Keren Barratt

Arsenal	Sheffield Wednesday

=== Replay ===
20 May 1993
20:15 BST

Arsenal	2–1 (a.e.t.)	Sheffield Wednesday
Wright 34'; Linighan 119'		Waddle 68'

Wembley, London
Attendance: 62,267
Referee: Keren Barratt

Arsenal	Sheffield Wednesday

== Media coverage ==
For the fifth consecutive season in the United Kingdom, the BBC were the free to air broadcasters while Sky Sports were the subscription broadcasters.

The matches shown live on the BBC were:

• Nottingham Forest 2–1 Southampton (R3)

• Norwich City 0–2 Tottenham Hotspur (R4)

• Sheffield United 2–1 Manchester United (R5)

• Manchester City 1–2 Tottenham Hotspur (QF)

• Arsenal 1–0 Tottenham Hotspur (SF)

• Arsenal 1–1 Sheffield Wednesday (Final)

• Arsenal 2–1 Sheffield Wednesday (Final Replay)

The matches shown live on Sky Sports were:

• Reading 1–0 Birmingham City (R1)

• Stoke City 0–0 Port Vale (R1)

• Port Vale 3–1 Stoke City (R1 Replay)

• Reading 2–1 Leyton Orient (R2)

• Wycombe Wanderers 2–2 West Bromwich Albion (R2)

• West Bromwich Albion 1–0 Wycombe Wanderers (R2 Replay)

• Queens Park Rangers 3–0 Swindon Town (R3)

• Bristol Rovers 0–3 Aston Villa (R3 Replay)

• Arsenal 2–2 Leeds United (R4)

• Leeds United 2–3 Arsenal (R4 Replay)

• Tottenham Hotspur 3–2 Wimbledon (R5)

• Derby County 3–3 Sheffield Wednesday (QF)

• Sheffield Wednesday 1–0 Derby County (QF Replay)

• Sheffield Wednesday 2–1 Sheffield United (SF)
