= David Linighan =

English footballer (born 1965)

Personal information
- Full name: David Linighan
- Date of birth: 9 January 1965 (age 61)
- Place of birth: Hartlepool, England
- Height: 6 ft 2 in (1.88 m)
- Position: Centre-back

Senior career*
Years	Team	Apps	(Gls)
1982–1986	Hartlepool United	91	(5)
1985	→ Leeds United (loan)	0	(0)
1986	Derby County	0	(0)
1986–1988	Shrewsbury Town	65	(1)
1988–1995	Ipswich Town	277	(12)
1995–1998	Blackpool	100	(5)
1998–1999	Dunfermline Athletic	1	(0)
1999	→ Mansfield Town (loan)	10	(0)
1999–2000	Mansfield Town	38	(0)
2000–2001	Southport	18	(2)
2001	Chester City	3	(0)
2002	Hyde United	8	(0)
Total		611	(25)
- * Club domestic league appearances and goals

David Linighan (born 9 January 1965) is an English former professional footballer who played as a defender from 1982 until 2002.

He notably spent time in the Premier League with Ipswich Town and in the Scottish Premier League with Dunfermline Athletic. He also played in the Football League for Hartlepool United, Derby County, Shrewsbury Town, Blackpool, Mansfield Town and Chester City. He also had spells in Non-league with Southport and Hyde United.

== Career ==
Linighan was born in Hartlepool, County Durham, and attended English Martyrs School. He began his career at Hartlepool United in 1982 as a 17-year-old. He remained at Victoria Park for four years, making close to 100 league appearances for the club.

After a brief spell at Derby County in 1986, he joined Shrewsbury Town for a £30,000 fee. In two years with the Shrews, Linighan made 65 league appearances, scoring one goal.

Linighan joined Ipswich Town in 1988 for £300,000. In eight years, he made a career-high 277 league appearances, scoring twelve goals, and played in the Premier League for three seasons (1992 to 1995).

In 1995, Linighan was signed by Sam Allardyce to join up with his Blackpool team. He played under three managers during his three years at Bloomfield Road, the others being Gary Megson and Nigel Worthington, scoring five goals in a century of league appearances.

Scottish club Dunfermline Athletic came in for the defender's services in 1998, and he moved north of the border for what proved to be just one game. During his time with the Pars, he was loaned to Mansfield Town, whom he would join on a permanent basis in 1999.

In 2000, Linighan moved into non-league football with Southport and Chester City, before a short spell with Hyde United in 2002 where he made eleven appearances, before retiring.

== Personal life ==
Linighan's father, Brian Linighan, and two of his brothers, Andy and Brian, also played football professionally. He now works as a carpenter.

== Honours ==
Ipswich Town

- Football League Second Division: 1991–92

Individual

- Ipswich Town Player of the Year: 1990–91
- PFA Team of the Year: 1991–92 Second Division
