= Philip Don =

Football referee

- Born: 10 March 1952 (age 74); Sheffield, England
- Other occupation: School headteacher

Domestic
Years	League	Role
1986–1992	First Division	Referee
1992–1995	Premier League	Referee

International
Years	League	Role
1992–1995	FIFA	Referee

Philip Don (born 10 March 1952) is a former football referee and school headteacher from England. Don was originally from Sheffield but his teaching career took him south to Middlesex. He is counted amongst the top 100 referees of all time in a list maintained by the International Federation of Football History and Statistics (IFFHS).

== Career ==
He became a Football League linesman in 1980 at the age of 28. In 1985, he missed out at the interview stage for a place on the referees list but was successful the following year.

Very soon he showed his potential to be a leading referee and picked up a fair number of top division games. His progress was accelerated by FIFA's decision to reduce its retirement age for referees to forty five. This provided new opportunities for a number of younger officials and Don was one of five promoted to the FIFA List in 1992. His appointment to that year's FA Cup Final between Liverpool and Sunderland marked him out as a leader amongst the new crop of English international referees and he was to hold that status over the next few years.

In a short time he made his mark on the international stage. When the original choice for the 1993-94 UEFA Champions League Final, Dutchman John Blankenstein, had to withdraw, Don took charge of the game in Athens, even though he had little over two years experience at that level. In the match, Milan thrashed Barcelona 4–0. He officiated in two matches in the 1994 World Cup: the quarter-final between Sweden and Romania in Palo Alto, and the first-round game between Saudi Arabia and Morocco in New Jersey.

Don took charge of the 1995 League Cup Final but his career came to a premature end at the end of that season. He had to retire, five years early, as work commitments as a headteacher took priority.

== In retirement ==
He moved into a referee assessing role and later became head of refereeing at the Football Association towards the end of the 1990s. He favoured a hardline, "by the book" style of refereeing in the Premier League and ushered in the new Select List of professional referees in 2001. This though led to tensions, particularly with David Elleray who preferred to maintain his teaching career at Harrow School rather than turn professional. Other tensions appeared and he was later replaced by Keith Hackett.

== Life outside football ==
He is the father of world champion triathlete Tim Don.

== Sources ==
=== Print ===
- Elleray, David (2004) The Man in the Middle, Time Warner.
- Football League Handbooks 1980–1985.
- Rothmans / Sky Sports Football Yearbooks, 1986 onwards.

=== External links ===
- Philip Don Referee Statistics at soccerbase.com

Preceded by Roger Milford	FA Cup Final Referee; 1992	Succeeded by Keren Barratt
