= Andy Linighan =

English footballer

Personal information
- Full name: Andrew Linighan
- Date of birth: 18 June 1962 (age 64)
- Place of birth: Hartlepool, England
- Height: 1.88 m (6 ft 2 in)
- Position: Defender

Youth career
- 1979–1980: Smith's Dock

Senior career*
Years	Team	Apps	(Gls)
1980–1984	Hartlepool United	110	(4)
1984–1986	Leeds United	66	(3)
1986–1988	Oldham Athletic	87	(6)
1988–1990	Norwich City	74	(6)
1990–1997	Arsenal	119	(5)
1997–2000	Crystal Palace	111	(5)
1998–1999	→ Queen's Park Rangers (loan)	7	(0)
2000–2001	Oxford United	13	(0)
2001	St Albans City	4	(0)
Total		591	(42)

International career
1989–90	England B	4	(0)
- * Club domestic league appearances and goals

Andrew Linighan (born 18 June 1962) is an English former professional footballer who played as a defender from 1980 until 2000, notably in the Premier League for Arsenal and Crystal Palace.

He also played in the Football League for Hartlepool United, Leeds United, Oldham Athletic, Norwich City, Queens Park Rangers and Oxford United before finishing his career with Non-league St Albans City.

== Career ==
Linighan was born in Hartlepool into a footballing family: his father, Brian Linighan, and his brothers David and Brian were also professional footballers. He first played for his local side, Hartlepool United, before he signed for Leeds United in 1984. He spent two season at Elland Road, being part of the team which narrowly missed out on promotion to the First Division in his first season there and then signed for Oldham Athletic.

In March 1988, a 25-year-old Linighan finally arrived on the First Division scene when Oldham sold him to Norwich City for £350,000. A tall, imposing centre back, Linighan became notable for his calm performances in defence for Norwich, who finished fourth in the league and reached the FA Cup semi-finals in his first full season with them.

He was then signed by George Graham for Arsenal in a £1.2 million deal in July 1990. Linighan had been very reluctant to leave Norwich, but was told by then-chairman Robert Chase that he was being sold.

Linighan mainly played as backup to England international defenders Tony Adams and Steve Bould in his first season, in which Arsenal won the First Division. Linighan managed to put in 10 league appearances, which were enough for him to earn a winners medal. His biggest moment for the club came at the end of the 1992–93 season. Linighan was victorious as he lifted the League Cup as Arsenal beat Sheffield Wednesday 2–1 in the final at Wembley. Arsenal again met Wednesday of whom they faced in the final of the FA Cup. The final finished 1–1, forcing a replay, which finished a goal apiece after 90 minutes and thus went to extra time. With 119 minutes gone, Linighan, who was suffering from a broken nose after Mark Bright had struck him in the face with his elbow, came up for a corner and headed in the winner. Coincidentally it was Bright who Linighan outjumped to score. Thanks to his goal, Arsenal became the first club in English football to win the Cup Double. His former club, Norwich City, qualified for the UEFA Cup as a result of his FA Cup final winning goal, as it meant the European place for the League Cup winner went to the team who had finished third in the Premier League instead.

By then, Linighan's place in the Arsenal side was further in doubt, as Martin Keown was no longer cup-tied after signing for the club earlier that year. Despite this, he stayed on at the club as fourth-choice centre-back. A highlight in his later years at Arsenal was scoring a late equaliser in a 2–2 draw away at Aston Villa in September 1996.

After more than six years at Highbury, he was sold to Division One promotion chasers Crystal Palace for £110,000 in January 1997. He helped Palace as they won promotion to the Premiership that year as playoff winners. Linighan also in that year became the captain of the Eagles, but was unable to prevent them from being relegated straight back to Division One. He stuck with Palace during the club's financial problems, even after they were forced to loan him to Queens Park Rangers for the final stages of the 1998–99 season to reduce their wage bill. Linighan returned to the club after his loan spell as captain, and in his 38th year was voted as Crystal Palace's Player of the Year in 1999–2000. After a falling out with new owner Simon Jordan, he was given a free transfer in the autumn of 2000.

Linighan saw out the rest of the season with Oxford United, which ended in disappointment as United were relegated to the Division Three. Afterwards he briefly played for non-league St Albans, before retiring completely from the game.

== Personal life ==
After his playing days came to an end, Linighan became the owner of a plumbing company.

== Career statistics ==
Appearances and goals by club, season and competition
Club	Season	League			FA Cup		League Cup		Europe		Other		Total	
Club	Season	Division	Apps	Goals	Apps	Goals	Apps	Goals	Apps	Goals	Apps	Goals	Apps	Goals
Hartlepool United	1980–81	Fourth Division	6	0	0	0	0	0	―		―		6	0
Hartlepool United	1981–82	Fourth Division	17	0	3	0	2	0	―		3 (Note: Appearance(s) in Football League Trophy)	0	25	0
Hartlepool United	1982–83	Fourth Division	45	3	3	0	4	1	―		1	0	53	4
Hartlepool United	1983–84	Fourth Division	42	1	2	0	2	0	―		1	1	47	2
Hartlepool United	Total		110	4	8	0	8	1	―		5	1	131	6
Leeds United	1984–85	Second Division	42	2	1	0	3	0	―		―		46	2
Leeds United	1985–86	Second Division	24	1	1	0	3	1	―		2 (Note: Appearances in Full Members' Cup)	0	30	2
Leeds United	Total		66	3	2	0	6	1	―		2	0	76	4
Norwich	?	?	?											
Arsenal	1990–91	First Division	10	0	4	0	0	0	―		―		14	0
Arsenal	1991–92	First Division	17	0	0	0	2	0	2 (Note: Appearances in UEFA European Cup/UEFA Champions League)	1	―		22	1
Arsenal	1992–93	Premier League	21	2	7	1	4	1	―		―		32	4
Arsenal	1993–94	Premier League	21	0	0	0	4	0	2 (Note: Appearances in UEFA Cup Winners' Cup)	0	1 (Note: Appearance in FA Charity Shield)	0	28	0
Arsenal	1994–95	Premier League	20	2	2	0	2	0	3	0	―		27	2
Arsenal	1995–96	Premier League	18	0	1	0	2	0	―		―		21	0
Arsenal	1996–97	Premier League	11	1	0	0	0	0	2 (Note: Appearances in UEFA Cup)	0	―		13	1
Arsenal	Total		119	5	14	1	14	1	9	1	1	0	157	8
Crystal Palace	1996–97	First Division	19	2	0	0	―		―		3 (Note: Appearances in Football League First Division play-offs)	0	22	2
Crystal Palace	1997–98	Premier League	26	0	3	0	2	0	―		―		31	0
Crystal Palace	1998–99	First Division	20	0	1	0	3	0	―		―		24	0
Crystal Palace	1999–2000	First Division	45	3	1	0	2	0	―		―		48	3
Crystal Palace	2000–01	First Division	1	0	―		2	1	―		―		3	1
Crystal Palace	Total		111	5	5	0	9	1	―		3	0	128	5
Queens Park Rangers (loan)	1998–99	First Division	7	0	―		―		―		―		7	0
Oxford United	2000–01	Second Division	13	0	2	0	―		―		0	0	15	0
St Albans City	2001–02	Isthmian League Premier Division	4	0	―		―		―		―		4	0
Career total			430	17	31	1	37	4	9	1	11	1	518	24

== Honours ==
Arsenal

- Football League First Division: 1990–91
- FA Cup: 1992–93
- Football League Cup: 1992–93
- FA Charity Shield: 1991 (shared)
- European Cup Winners' Cup: 1993–94; runner-up: 1994–95

Crystal Palace

- Football League First Division play-offs: 1997

Individual

- Crystal Palace Player of the Year: 1999–2000

Sporting positions
Preceded by Andy Roberts	Crystal Palace captain 1997–2000	Succeeded by Neil Ruddock
