= Sean Hankin =

English footballer

Personal information
- Full name: Sean Anthony Hankin
- Date of birth: 28 February 1981 (age 45)
- Place of birth: Camberley, England
- Height: 5 ft 11 in (1.80 m)
- Position: Defender

Youth career
- 19??–1999: Crystal Palace

Senior career*
Years	Team	Apps	(Gls)
1999–2001	Crystal Palace	1	(0)
2001	→ Torquay United (loan)	5	(0)
2001–2003	Torquay United	42	(1)
2003	Hornchurch		
2003	Margate	3	(0)
2003	Northwich Victoria	1	(0)
2003–2005	Crawley Town	49	(1)
2005	Lewes	0	(0)
2005	St Albans City	5	(0)
2005	Llanelli	0	(0)
2005–2007	Farnborough Town		
2007–2011	Basingstoke Town	84	(3)
2010–2011	→ Fleet Town (dual reg.)		
2011	A.F.C. Totton		
2011–201?	Badshot Lea		
- * Club domestic league appearances and goals

Sean Hankin (born 28 February 1981) is an English former professional footballer who played as a defender in the Football League for Crystal Palace and Torquay United.

== Life and career ==
Hankin was born in 1981 in Camberley, Surrey. He began his career as an apprentice at Crystal Palace, turning professional in June 1999. He made his league debut on 7 March 2000, coming on as a substitute for the injured Simon Rodger in the goalless draw with Bolton Wanderers at Selhurst Park, and agreed a new contract with Crystal Palace in June 2001.

Having made no more first-team appearances, Hankin joined Torquay United on loan in October 2001, as a replacement for fellow Palace player David Woozley who was returning to Selhurst Park at the end of his loan spell. He made his Torquay debut in the Football League Trophy against Bristol City and was sent off on his league debut in the 2–0 defeat away to Mansfield Town on 23 October. In December, he joined Torquay on a permanent deal for a £20,000 fee. Initially a regular in the Torquay side, Hankin lost his place in the team due to injury, was given only a short-term contract, and left in September 2003.

After brief spells with Hornchurch of the Isthmian League and Conference clubs Margate and Northwich Victoria, as well as training with Woking, Hankin settled at Crawley Town, helping them win the 2003–04 Southern League title and playing regularly in their first season in the Conference. He was released at the end of that season, and spent short spells with Lewes, for which he never played a Conference South match, and St Albans City, for which he played five times before being released at the end of November.

Hankin then signed for Llanelli, but moved on almost immediately to Farnborough Town. He was a regular in their side for the remainder of the season and the whole of 2006–07, making 50 appearances in all competitions. The club then went into liquidation, reformed two divisions lower, and Hankin left to join rivals Basingstoke Town. During the last of his four seasons with Basingstoke, he spent time with Fleet Town on a dual registration, before playing for clubs including A.F.C. Totton and Badshot Lea.
