= Allan McDonald (footballer) =

Australian rules footballer

Personal information
- Full name: Allan McDonald
- Born: 3 June 1946 (age 80)
- Original team: East Brighton
- Height: 173 cm (5 ft 8 in)
- Weight: 70 kg (154 lb)
- Position: Wing

Playing career^{1}
Years	Club	Games (Goals)
1965	St Kilda	2 (0)
- ^{1} Playing statistics correct to the end of 1965.

Allan McDonald (born 3 June 1946) is a former Australian rules footballer who played for the St Kilda Football Club in the Victorian Football League (VFL).
