= Andrew Martin (computer scientist) =

British computer scientist

Andrew Martin is a British computer scientist at the University of Oxford, England, where he is Professor of Systems Security, Director of the Centre for Doctoral Training in Cyber Security (2013–2023) and deputy director and lecturer in Software Engineering Programme. He is a member of the Oxford University Department of Computer Science.

== Education ==
He obtained BA in Mathematics and Computation (1986–1989) and DPhil in Machine-Assisted Theorem Proving for Software Engineering (1991–1994) from the University of Oxford.

== Career ==
After his first degree, he joined Praxis High Integrity Systems, Bath as Industrial Software Engineer. After his DPhil, he became Research Fellow at the Software Verification Research Centre in the University of Queensland in Australia. Before taking up his current post in 1999, he was briefly a lecturer in the University of Southampton.

== Book ==
In 2025, Andrew Martin has written a book with the title Securing the Digital Frontier Cyber Security for Responsible Citizens and Strategic Thinkers. You can order this book from.

== Publications ==
Martin's publications cover software engineering, security, trusted computing in general and formal methods in particular
