= David Woozley =

English footballer (born 1979)

Personal information
- Full name: David James Woozley
- Date of birth: 6 December 1979 (age 46)
- Place of birth: Ascot, England
- Height: 6 ft 0 in (1.83 m)
- Position: Defender

Youth career
- ?–1997: Crystal Palace

Senior career*
Years	Team	Apps	(Gls)
1997–2002	Crystal Palace	29	(0)
2000	→ AFC Bournemouth (loan)	6	(0)
2001	→ Torquay United (loan)	12	(0)
2002–2004	Torquay United	60	(3)
2004–2005	Oxford United	13	(1)
2005	→ Yeovil Town (loan)	1	(0)
2005–2007	Crawley Town	75	(5)
2007–2009	Farnborough	93	(10)
2009–2011	Windsor & Eton		
2011–2014	Slough Town	155	(6)
2014–	Binfield	0	(0)

Managerial career
- 2006–2007: Crawley Town
- * Club domestic league appearances and goals

David James Woozley (born 6 December 1979) is an English former professional footballer who last played for Binfield after leaving Slough Town in the summer of 2014. As of August 2007, Woozley worked in the Fire Service.

== Career ==
Woozley was born near Bracknell in Berkshire and began his career as a trainee with Crystal Palace, turning professional in August 1997. He made his Palace debut on 28 March 1999 in a 1–0 win at home to Bradford City and kept his place in the side for the remainder of the season. He played 22 times in the league and six times in cup games the following season, but at the start of the 2000–2001 season found himself out of favour and was allowed to join AFC Bournemouth on loan.

He returned to Palace, but could not find a way back into the first team. At the start of the following season he had a successful loan spell with Torquay United, but returned to Palace. He finally joined Torquay in March 2002 on a free transfer and quickly re-established himself in Torquay's defence, playing alongside either Steve Woods or his former Palace teammate Sean Hankin.

He was again a regular the following season, but lost his place after the signing of Craig Taylor and played just ten league games as Torquay won promotion, However, he did play in the crucial 2–1 win at Southend United on the last day of the season, coming on as a last minute substitute for David Graham as Torquay held on to clinch promotion.

He was released shortly after the Southend game and in July 2004 signed for Oxford United, but struggled to establish himself and joined Yeovil Town on loan in March 2005. He was released by Oxford at the end the season and joined Crawley Town in August 2005.

In October 2006 Woozley became joint manager of Crawley Town with Ben Judge after manager John Hollins and his assistant Alan Lewer were sacked from the club. In January 2007 it was announced that Woozley and Judge would remain in charge until the end of the season.

On 28 August 2007, Woozley announced that he was to leave Crawley Town and retire from professional football, aged 27, to take up a job with the Fire Service. He continued his football career, signing for semi-professional team Farnborough. He was released by Farnborough in May 2009 due to work commitments restricting the time he could commit to attending team training sessions. He initially joined Staines Town, before transferring to Carshalton Athletic later in the same season.

Woozley signed for Windsor & Eton midway through the 2009–10 season and helped them to win the league promoting them to the Southern League Premier Division. For the 2010–11 season he was promoted to club captain. After the club folded in 2011, he joined local rivals Slough Town in the Southern League Division One Central, where he captained the side to promotion in 2013-14 through the play-offs to reach the Southern League Premier Division. Whilst at Slough Town he won a number of awards, including: Players' Player of the Season (2011–12) and (2012–13), Manager's Player of the Season (2012–13), Supporters' Player of the Season (2012–13) and the Supporters' Player of the Season runner-up (2013–14).
