= Andy Martin (architect) =

Australian architect

Andy Martin is an American architect and designer based in London. He is the director of Andy Martin Architecture and known for his use of natural light, dark space, and playful materials. His work ranges from furniture and product design to restaurant, bar, and residential interior design. He also lectures on architecture and design, serves as a university studio critic, and is a board member for civic institutions and jury awards programs.

== Early life and education ==
Andy Martin was born in Middletown, Connecticut, USA. He studied architecture at the University of Technology and completed his initial training at the Architectural Association School of Architecture in London.

== Career ==
Martin moved to Paris in 1992 where he began working with Marc Newson on several interior projects. It was through collaborations on Coast restaurant (London) and Mash & Air (Manchester) that Martin developed his interest in restaurant design. Martin's client on these projects was the restaurateur Oliver Peyton. Martin was appointed as Concept Architect for the flagship Mash 02 restaurant in London.

After winning an architectural competition in 1999, he competed against Zaha Hadid. Martin was asked to design the Isola restaurant in London. After the success of this restaurant, Martin formed a new practice, Andy Martin Architecture. He designed the Olga Polizzi and William Shawcross residence in West London. Andy Martin Architecture designs restaurants and bars around London and has worked on projects in Hong Kong, Saudi Arabia, California and Greece.

== Works ==
Restaurant Design

- Mash 02, 1998
- Mash 03, 2000
- Isola, 2000
- The Admiralty at Somerset House, 2001
- L'etranger, 2003
- Barrafina, 2006
- Hereford Road, 2007
- Quo Vadis, 2008
- Chan Restaurant 2011
- L'etranger, 2012
- Villa Zevaco, 2012

Andy Martin Workshop

- Crescent Pearl, 1989
- Pancreas, 1989
- Grubb Lounge, 1991
- Plug Bucket, 1997
- Weinerchaise, 2009
- Gridspace, 2012
- The Undergraduate Shelving, 2012
- Villa Zevaco Lamp, 2012

== Books ==
- Modernism and Modernization in Architecture, Academy Editions, 1999, p 49, 52, 53
- Sci-Fi Architecture, AD Magazine, Vol69 No3/4, March–April 1999, p 54, 55
- Interior Spaces of Europe Vol. 2, The Images Publishing Group, 1999, p112, 113
- Caffe e Ristoranti, Frederico Motta Editore, September 2000, p118-132
- Cool Shops London, teNeues Publishing 2005, p10, 11
- New Bar and Club Design, Laurence King 2005, p32, 33 and p84, 85

== Awards ==
- Winner of Best Interior Design, Time Out Eating & Drinking Awards 2000
- Winner of Best New Restaurant, Evening Standard Restaurant Awards 2001
- Winner of New Bar Design, Theme Magazine Bar Awards 2003
- Winner of Restaurant & Bar Design Awards, Best lighting, Chan restaurant, 2011
