= Dean Austin =

English footballer (born 1970)

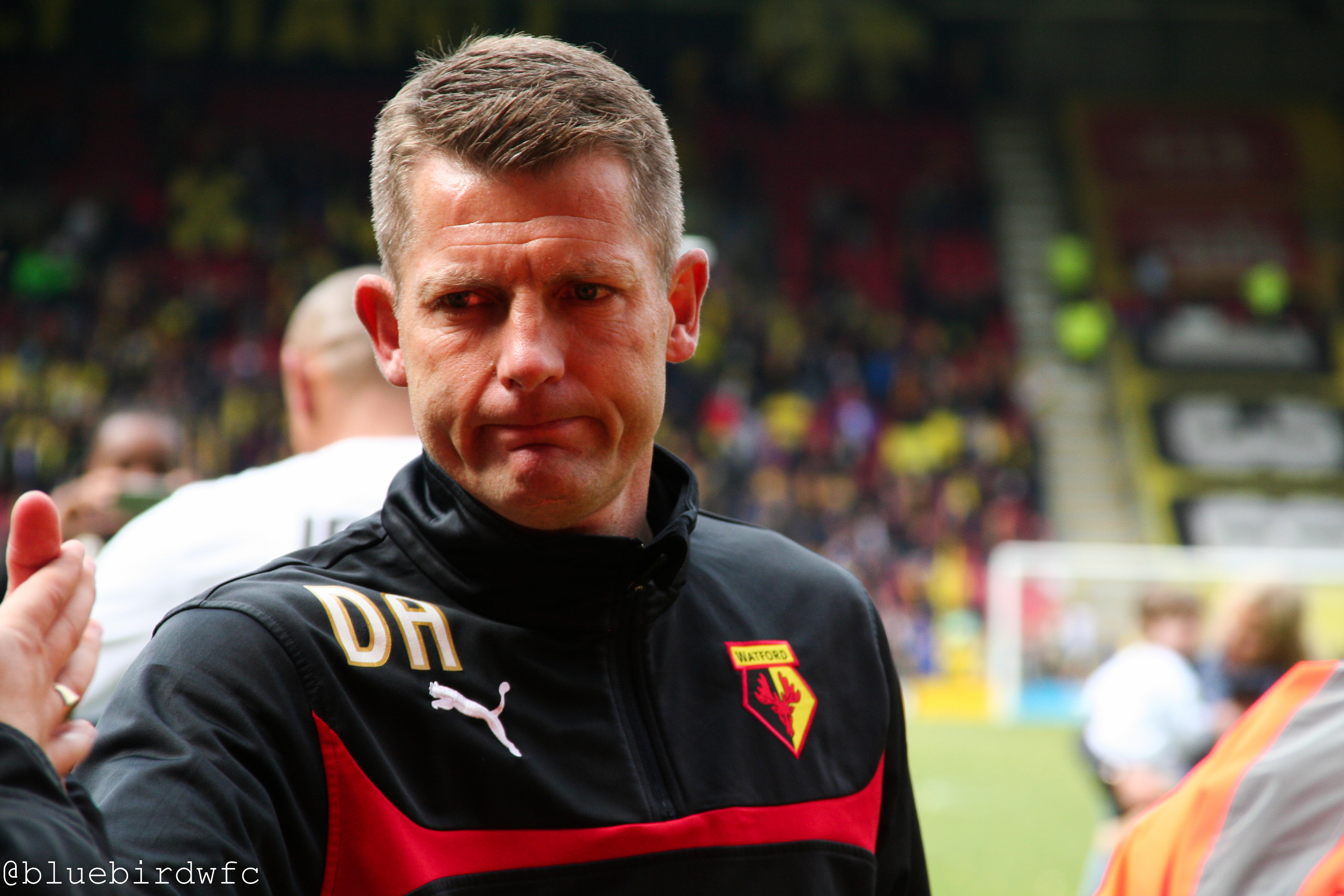
- Austin with Watford in 2015

Personal information
- Full name: Dean Barry Austin
- Date of birth: 26 April 1970 (age 56)
- Place of birth: Hemel Hempstead, England
- Height: 5 ft 11 in (1.80 m)
- Position: Defender

Youth career
- 1987–1989: Watford
- St Albans City

Senior career*
Years	Team	Apps	(Gls)
1989–1990	St Albans City	75	(9)
1990–1992	Southend United	96	(2)
1992–1998	Tottenham Hotspur	124	(0)
1998–2002	Crystal Palace	142	(6)
2002–2003	Woking	17	(2)
Total		454	(19)

Managerial career
- 2004–2005: Farnborough Town
- 2018: Northampton Town (caretaker)
- 2018: Northampton Town
- * Club domestic league appearances and goals

Dean Barry Austin (born 26 April 1970) is an English football manager and former professional player who is the sporting director at Coventry City.

As a player, he was a defender who notably played in the Premier League for Tottenham Hotspur, making 124 appearances for the club over a six-year spell. He also notably played in the Football League for Crystal Palace where he made the most appearances of his career. He would also play professionally for Southend United and at non-league level for St Albans City and Woking.

Following retirement, he became manager of Farnborough Town, and then went on to hold coaching roles at Southend United, Watford, Reading, Crystal Palace, Bolton Wanderers and Notts County. In April 2018, Austin was appointed manager of Northampton Town, initially in a caretaker capacity, but was dismissed in September of the same year.

== Playing career ==
=== Early career ===
At the age of 12, Austin managed to get on the Watford books and also played for Sunday League side Forest United. At the age of 17, he came back to Watford and played for the under-18s. He then joined non-league side St Albans City.

=== Southend United ===
Austin was signed by Southend manager David Webb from St Albans for £14,000 in 1990 and made his debut on 10 April, as the "Shrimpers" held Burnley to a 0–0 draw. He went on to play the last seven games of the 1989–90 season as Southend were automatically promoted to the Third Division after defeating Peterborough 2–0 on the final day of the season. He scored his first goal for the club on 4 September 1990 in the Rumblelows Cup against Aldershot. In the 1990–91 season he received an injury and was forced to miss out on the beginning of the season, but after recovering he became an integral part of the team as Southend just missed out on the Division 3 title. He scored two more goals for Southend in the 1991–92 season, both in the league. Southend had briefly topped the Second Division after the early Boxing Day games but eventually fell away to mid table in their first season at this level, ending hopes of a unique third successive promotion and a place in the new FA Premier League.

His form attracted interest from bigger clubs and midway through the season Derby County approached Austin, but he felt he could hold out for bigger clubs. He ended up being signed by Tottenham Hotspur, the club he supported as a child by manager Terry Venables for £375,000. In all competitions, he had made 109 appearances for Southend, scoring three goals.

=== Tottenham Hotspur ===
Austin made his debut on 22 August 1992 coming on as a sub for Terry Fenwick in a Premier League match against Crystal Palace. His first season at Spurs was rather successful, Tottenham finished in 8th place. The following Season he suffered a broken leg against Oldham, on a day when Tottenham went top of the League. By the time Austin returned to fitness Spurs were in a relegation battle under Ossie Ardilles. However, next season he was back in the team and enjoying his best form ever under Gerry Francis Tottenham reached the semi-final of the FA Cup, only to lose to eventual winners Everton 4–1. Towards the end of this season Austin suffered a knee injury which resulted in three operations. Austin struggled for fitness over the next two years before suffering another injury to his other knee resulting in him being out for six months and not returning until February 98. He saw out his contract and was reunited with Terry Venables at Crystal Palace under the Bosman ruling. In all competitions, he made 154 appearances for Tottenham but without scoring.

=== Crystal Palace ===
Austin linked up with former manager Terry Venables at Crystal Palace, although Venables only stayed for six months. The first six months were particularly difficult but after 18 months Austin became a firm fans favourite when he alone decided to stay at the club when Palace entered administration. He accepted a massive pay cut, and he marked his return to the team by scoring the winner against Norwich City. The club, however went into administration in 1999 and defied the odds, staying in Division 1 despite being tipped to go down. Austin was named club captain in the summer of 1999. But having made 142 appearances for Palace and scoring six times, while not playing under Trevor Francis and suffering with both knee and foot injuries he decided to call time on his professional career.

=== Woking ===
After Austin had left Crystal Palace he was asked by Woking manager Glenn Cockerill to come and help them out of trouble. He was appointed club captain by Cockerill as the club narrowly avoided relegation from the Football Conference on his 33rd birthday and Austin decided then and there to call time on his playing career and retired from playing.

== Coaching career ==
After a brief spell coaching in Watford's academy in 2003–04, Austin was employed as director of football of Farnborough Town in June 2004, where within a few weeks and only two weeks before the season started, he was asked to take over as manager. Caught in the middle of an ownership battle which resulted in the chairman Tony Theo leaving the club, Austin dealt with numerous financial issues before leaving in February 2005 with the club just outside the relegation zone. Farnborough lost the next 14 games and were relegated before entering administration.

In the summer of 2005, Austin returned to Southend with Steve Tilson as head of recruitment and coach. He was an integral part of Southend winning two successive promotions from League Two into the Championship and was responsible for developing young players such as Michael Kightly, Stuart O'Keefe and Gary Hooper.

After three successful years, Austin left Southend to become assistant manager to Brendan Rodgers at Watford. A strong end to the season saw Reading approach Rodgers and his team to take over from the departing Steve Coppell. The whole team were relieved of their duties in December 2009 and in 2010 Austin returned to Crystal Palace first-team coach and U21 manager. He left in the summer of 2011 having not been able to agree a role with the then manager Dougie Freedman. Austin decided to take a break from football at this time.

From January 2012 until February 2013, Austin was a regional scout for Bolton Wanderers but left his position to join Chris Kiwomya at Notts County as assistant manager. Austin decided to leave Notts County's backroom team in May 2013 for personal reasons.

Austin returned to Watford as an assistant coach in January 2015. He was the sole English coach in Slaviša Jokanović's backroom team, which led Watford to promotion from the Championship to the Premier League at the end of the 2014–15 season. Austin was retained when Quique Sánchez Flores replaced Jokanović for the 2015–16 season.

In September 2017, Austin was appointed assistant coach of Northampton Town working alongside the newly appointed Jimmy Floyd Hasselbaink. In April 2018, after nine games without a win, Northampton sacked Hasselbaink and Austin took charge in a caretaker role. At the end of the 2017–18 season, although Northampton were relegated to League Two, the club took the decision to appoint Austin as permanent manager for the 2018–19 season. He was sacked on 30 September 2018 following a poor start to the season in which the team only won one game.

In September 2019, Austin returned to Watford, joining the coaching staff as an assistant to new manager Quique Sánchez Flores. He departed the club for the second time when Flores was sacked in December.

On 25 August 2021, Austin was confirmed as Director of Football at St Albans. As of April 2022, Austin was studying on the FA's technical director course.

On 13 December 2022, Austin left St Albans for the position of head of recruitment at Coventry City. On 3 July 2026, Austin became Coventry City’s first ever sporting director.

== Managerial statistics ==
As of match played 29 September 2018

Managerial record by team and tenure
Team	From	To	Record								Ref	
Team	From	To	G	W	D	L	GF	GA	GD	Win %	Ref	
Farnborough Town	31 July 2004	25 February 2005	34	5	10	19	27	58	−31	14.71		
Northampton Town (caretaker)	2 April 2018	12 May 2018	5	2	1	2	7	8	−1	40.00		
Northampton Town	12 May 2018	30 September 2018	12	1	5	6	9	19	−10	8.33		
Total				51	8	16	27	43	85	−42	15.69	—
