= Keren Barratt =

English football referee

- Full name: Keren P J Barratt
- Born: February 1946 (age 80); Coventry, Warwickshire, England

Domestic
Years	League	Role
1979–1981	Football League	Assistant referee
1981–1992	Football League	Referee
1992–1994	Premier League	Referee

Keren P. J. Barratt (born February 1946) is an English former football referee, who operated in the Football League and Premier League. He was based in Coventry, West Midlands, during his time on the List.

== Career ==
He became a Football League linesman in 1978, and just two years later was promoted to the Referees List.

By the late 1980s he was frequently taking charge of top division games. He became a member of the new Premier League list for the 1992-93 season, taking charge of the game between Manchester United and Everton at Old Trafford on 19 August 1992, with the away side winning 3–0.

His career climaxed with the 1993 FA Cup Final between Arsenal and Sheffield Wednesday at Wembley on 15 May 1993. This tie went to a replay and he took charge of that match, also at Wembley, on 20 May of that year. He is one of only a few referees (alongside Roger Milford, Jeff Winter and Alan Wiley) in recent times to be awarded control of an FA Cup Final without ever reaching international status. He had one more season on the list before retiring in 1994.

He has since been a referees' assessor during matches for the Football Association, mainly premier league games.

For the last few years, Keren has been working full-time for the Premier League as the PGMOL referees Select Group Manager alongside Keith Hackett and now Mike Riley.

He is married to Christine and has two daughters Kara and Claire.

Preceded by Philip Don	FA Cup Final Referee; 1993	Succeeded by David Elleray
