= Andy Martin (pentathlete) =

British modern pentathlete

Personal information
- Full name: Andrew Charles Martin
- Born: 18 May 1927 Hampshire, England
- Died: 3 May 2003 (aged 75) Mackay, Queensland, Australia

Sport
- Sport: Modern pentathlon

Andrew Charles Martin (18 May 1927 – 3 May 2003) was a British modern pentathlete. He competed at the 1948 Summer Olympics.
