= Andy Martin (footballer, born 1980) =

Welsh footballer

Personal information
- Full name: Andrew Peter Martin
- Date of birth: 28 February 1980 (age 46)
- Place of birth: Cardiff, Wales
- Position: Striker

Youth career
- Crystal Palace

Senior career*
Years	Team	Apps	(Gls)
1997–2002	Crystal Palace	22	(2)
2002	→ Torquay United (loan)	5	(0)
2002	Hereford United	1	(0)
2002	Tooting & Mitcham United	3	(2)
2002–2004	Hornchurch	31	(5)
2004	Sutton United	13	(2)
2005	Dulwich Hamlet	3	(1)
2005	AFC Wimbledon	6	(1)
2005–2006	Whyteleafe	24	(6)
2006	Croydon Athletic	15	(4)
2006–2007	Tonbridge Angels	9	(3)
2007	Cray Wanderers		
2007	Maidstone United		
2007–2008	Leatherhead		
2008	Fisher Athletic		
2008	Maidstone United		
2008–2009	Whyteleafe		

International career
- Wales U21

Managerial career
- 2011–2012: Merstham
- * Club domestic league appearances and goals

Andrew Peter Martin (born 28 February 1980) is a Welsh retired footballer. He is a former under-21 international and played in the Football League for Crystal Palace, Torquay United and Hereford United before dropping into non-league football. He was manager of Isthmian League side Merstham between 2011 and 2012.

== Career ==
Martin was educated at Corpus Christi High School in Cardiff. In 1996, he was selected for the Wales Under-19s, and was spotted by a scout from Crystal Palace.

A year later, Martin began his career as a trainee at Crystal Palace, turning professional in the 1997 close season, making his debut on 3 April 1999, playing in Palace's 1–0 win away to Norwich City. He made two further appearances at the end of that season. He was a regular squad member the following season, although played only 18 times. He did however score two goals for Palace that season, the first coming on 26 December 1999 as Palace lost 2–1 away to Charlton Athletic and the second on 5 February 2000 as Palace lost 2–1 away to Wolverhampton Wanderers.

Martin found himself out of favour in the 2000–01 season, playing just once for Palace, in a 0–0 draw at home to Tranmere Rovers in the League Cup when he came on as substitute for Fan Zhiyi with just four minutes of extra-time remaining. This was to be his final first team appearance for Palace.

In March 2002 he joined Torquay United on loan, having trained at Plainmoor for several weeks before and scored in a friendly win away to Plymouth Argyle. He made his Torquay debut on 30 March 2002, playing in the 1–0 win away to Shrewsbury Town. he made four further appearances for Torquay before leaving at the end of his one-month loan spell.

He was released by Crystal Palace at the end of the season and in August 2002 joined Hereford United. He played just once in the Conference for Hereford, as a substitute in their 2–1 win at home to Farnborough Town on 17 August, but was released the following month. He had a trial with Brentford and joined Tooting & Mitcham United in September 2002.

A month later he moved to Hornchurch and joined Sutton United in July 2004. He was last in Sutton's match squad on 26 December 2004. He then played for Dulwich Hamlet before being released as part of their cost-cutting measures in February 2005. He joined AFC Wimbledon a few days later.

After leaving Wimbledon, he played for Whyteleafe and Croydon Athletic, who he left to join Tonbridge Angels late in the 2006 close-season. He joined Cray Wanderers in January 2007. He played a pre-season game for Welling United before joining Maidstone United in July 2007, but left in December 2007 to join Leatherhead. He then moved to Fisher Athletic in July 2008.

He rejoined Maidstone United in August 2008 before returning to Whyteleafe later that year. He retired as a player in the summer of 2009 to focus on his coaching activities.

In February 2011 Martin was made temporary manager of Isthmian League Division One South outfit Merstham, a role that was made permanent in the summer of 2011. However, he only lasted 20 games before being replaced by Antony Williams and Rob Smith.
