= 2013 Football League Championship play-off final =

Association football match in London

- The match was played at Wembley Stadium.
- Event: 2012–13 Football League Championship
Crystal Palace	Watford
1	0
- After extra time
- Date: 27 May 2013
- Venue: Wembley Stadium, London
- Man of the Match: Wilfried Zaha
- Referee: Martin Atkinson
- Attendance: 82,025

The 2013 Football League Championship play-off final was an association football match which was played on 27 May 2013 at Wembley Stadium, London, between Crystal Palace and Watford. The match was to determine the third and final team to gain promotion from the Football League Championship, the second tier of English football, to the Premier League. The top two teams of the 2012–13 Football League Championship season gained automatic promotion to the Premier League, while the teams placed from third to sixth place in the table partook in play-off semi-finals; Watford ended the season in third position while Crystal Palace finished fifth. The winners of these semi-finals competed for the final place for the 2013–14 season in the Premier League. Winning the game was estimated to be worth up to £120 million to the successful team.

The 2013 final, refereed by Martin Atkinson, was watched by a crowd of more than 82,000 people. The game ended goalless in regular time, and proceeded into extra time. Crystal Palace won 1–0, with the only goal of the game coming from Kevin Phillips in the last minute of the first half of extra time from the penalty spot. It was Palace's fourth win in five play-off finals. Wilfried Zaha was named man of the match.

Both teams finished mid-table in their respective leagues the following season. Crystal Palace ended the next season in 11th place in the Premier League, while Watford finished their following campaign in the Championship 13th place.

== Route to the final ==
Football League Championship final table, leading positions
Pos	Team	Pld	W	D	L	GF	GA	GD	Pts
1	Cardiff City	46	25	12	9	72	45	+27	87
2	Hull City	46	24	7	15	61	52	+9	79
3	Watford	46	23	8	15	85	58	+27	77
4	Brighton & Hove Albion	46	19	18	9	69	43	+26	75
5	Crystal Palace	46	19	15	12	73	62	+11	72
6	Leicester City	46	19	11	16	71	48	+23	68

Watford finished the regular 2012–13 season in third place in the Football League Championship, the second tier of the English football league system, two places ahead of Crystal Palace. Both therefore missed out on the two automatic places for promotion to the Premier League and instead took part in the play-offs to determine the third promoted team. Watford finished two points behind Hull City (who were promoted in second place) and ten behind league winners Cardiff City. Crystal Palace ended the season five points behind Watford.

Crystal Palace faced Brighton & Hove Albion in their play-off semi-final, the first leg being played at Selhurst Park. The game ended goalless but Palace's top scorer Glenn Murray was injured and had to be carried off on a stretcher midway through the second half after suffering what was suspected to be a cruciate ligament injury. The second leg was held three days later at Falmer Stadium, a venue at which Brighton had not lost since January. Palace went into the match having won once in their past eleven games and, as expected, without Murray. He was replaced by Aaron Wilbraham who had scored once in his 25 appearances that season. Wilfried Zaha put Palace ahead midway through the second half with a header from Yannick Bolasie and double their advantage late in the game, striking the ball into the roof of the net. The 2–0 aggregate win ensured the London club's qualification for the final.

In the other play-off semi-final, Watford's opponents were Leicester City, and the first leg was played at the King Power Stadium. The hosts won the match 1–0 with a David Nugent header from an Anthony Knockaert free kick late on. In the second leg, Matěj Vydra, recently named the Championship Player of the Year at the Football League Awards, put Watford into the lead with a left-foot volley from a Marco Cassetti pass into the far corner of Kasper Schmeichel's goal. Nugent restored parity in the leg with another header from a Knockaert corner, before Vydra played a one-two with Troy Deeney to score his second and equalise the semi-final 2–2 on aggregate. Leicester were awarded an injury time penalty: Knockaert stepped up to take it only to see it saved, and in the immediate counter-attack, Jonathan Hogg's knock-down was finished by Deeney to give Watford a 3–2 aggregate victory and passage to the final.

Crystal Palace			Round	Watford
Opponent	Result	Legs	Semi-finals	Opponent	Result	Legs
Brighton & Hove Albion	2–0	0–0 home; 2–0 away		Leicester City	3–2	0–1 away; 3–1 home

== Match ==
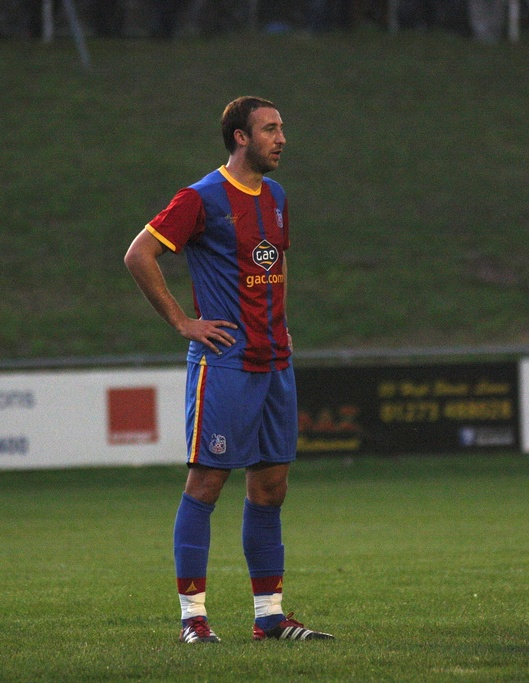
Crystal Palace were without their top scorer Glenn Murray who had scored 30 goals during the regular season.

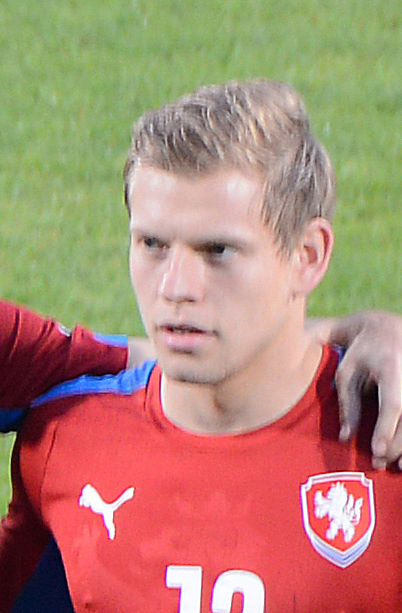
Watford's top scorer Matěj Vydra went off injured at half time in the final.

=== Background ===
This was Crystal Palace's fifth appearance in the second tier play-off final, with their most recent being in the 2004 final at the Millennium Stadium which they won 1–0 against West Ham United. Palace had also won the 1989 final (over two legs) and the 1997 final, and had lost the 1996 final. Watford also had play-off final experience, winning both their previous appearances, in the 1999 and 2006 finals. During the regular season, Crystal Palace lost their home game against 3–2 in August 2012 in what was Gianfranco Zola's first league match as manager of Watford. The return game played at Vicarage Road the following February ended in a 2–2 draw. Murray was Palace's top scorer with 30 while Vydra had scored the most for Watford with 22.

Both clubs sold out their allocation of tickets at Wembley Stadium, with Palace selling 33,000 tickets and Watford more than 34,000. The final was refereed by Martin Atkinson of the West Riding County Football Association, with assistant referees Stuart Burt and Peter Kirkup, while Neil Swarbrick acted as the fourth official. It was reported in the press and media that the match was worth more than £120 million over four years to the winning club through sponsorship and television appearances.

Seven of Watford's starting line-up were on loan at the club, four from Italian club Udinese, two from Spanish team Granada and one from Chelsea. Palace's soul loanee was Zaha who had been sold to Manchester United in the January transfer window and loaned back to the south London club. He was declared fit to play despite picking up an ankle injury in the semi-final, so Palace's team was unchanged. Daniel Pudil and Hogg were recalled to the Watford side, having been absent from the team that defeated Leicester City in the semi-final. Wilbraham retained his place in the Palace team as Murray's first semi-final injury kept him sidelined.

=== First half ===
Watford kicked the match off shortly after 3 p.m. in front of a Wembley crowd of 82,025. After a brief interlude to remove some balloons which had descended from the spectators into the Crystal Palace penalty area, Watford won a free kick for a foul on Deeney. The resulting set piece was cleared, and on 8 minutes, Palace's Jonny Williams was brought down by Hogg for another free kick, which came to nothing. Three minutes later, Joel Ekstrand received the first yellow card of the game after a late tackle on Wilbraham. Palace's South African international defender Kagisho Dikgacoi went down with a calf injury in the 15th minute and was replaced two minutes later by Stuart O'Keefe in the first substitution of the afternoon. A counter attack from Palace midway through the first half saw Zaha holding off two Watford defenders, enabling him to pass to Owen Garvan who delayed his shot too long and allowed Lloyd Doyley to block. The second yellow card of the afternoon was shown to Jedinak in the 28th minute after a poor challenge on Almen Abdi. Five minutes later, Vydra's first shot on goal was blocked by Palace defender Damien Delaney, but by the end of the half the Watford striker was visibly struggling after picking up an injury. Despite the clubs being the two top-scoring teams in the division, the half ended goalless.

=== Second half ===
Over the half-time break, Watford's Vydra was replaced by the Spanish striker Alexandre Geijo. Palace kicked off the second half and after two minutes the first chance fell to Watford's loanee Nathaniel Chalobah whose long-range strike went wide. Abdi's shot was then blocked by Delaney; meanwhile Jedinak began to struggle. In the 58th minute, a Geijo shot was easily saved by Julián Speroni in the Palace goal. Two minutes later a Wilbraham shot was blocked by Watford's goalkeeper Manuel Almunia. Abdi then brought down O'Keefe, who reacted to the challenge: both players were booked. Geijo then forced a save from Speroni in the 63rd minute before O'Keefe's effort from a Zaha square pass was saved by Almunia. In the 66th minute, Kevin Phillips came on to replace Williams for Palace. Twice in quick succession the Watford defence failed to deal with Palace attacks, but still the deadlock remained. With 18 minutes remaining, a cross from Zaha was headed back across goal by Phillips but Garvan failed to find the target, curling his shot past the outside of the post. Chalobah was then substituted off, with another loanee, Cristian Battocchio, coming on to replace him. With seven minutes remaining, Almunia saved a Wilbraham shot before Garvan was replaced by André Moritz in Palace's final substitution of the match. Fernando Forestieri was then brought on for Ikechi Anya. Both teams had chances to break the deadlock but after three minutes of added-on time, the referee Martin Atkinson brought the second half to a close, still goalless, for extra time to be played.

=== Extra time ===
Watford kicked off the first period of extra time, and three minutes in, Deeney brought another save from Speroni. Forestieri then shot wide from a tight angle. Nine minutes in, Danny Gabbidon conceded a corner which, taken by Abdi, was struck by Battocchio through a group of defenders and saved by Speroni. Dean Moxey was then booked for a foul on Forestieri, becoming the sixth player of the afternoon to receive a yellow card. On the brink of half time, Cassetti fouled Zaha in the Watford box and Palace were awarded a penalty. The spot kick was struck into the top-left corner by Phillips, putting Palace 1–0 ahead. Four minutes into the second half, a corner from Abdi was gathered by Speroni before Deeney could capitalise on the loose ball. In the 23rd minute, a free kick from Abdi from 25 yards (23 m) was easily caught by Speroni. With two minutes remaining, Joel Ward blocked an Ekstrand shot with his stomach; appeals for a penalty were dismissed by Atkinson. Forestieri then went close as Ward was forced to clear his shot off the Palace goal line. Two corners for Watford came to nothing and the referee blew his whistle to signify the end of extra time and the match, with Palace winning 1–0.

=== Details ===
27 May 2013
15:00 BST

Crystal Palace	1–0 (a.e.t.)	Watford
Phillips 105+1' (pen.)	Report

Wembley Stadium, London
Attendance: 82,025
Referee: Martin Atkinson (West Yorkshire)

Crystal Palace	Watford

GK	1	(Argentina) Julián Speroni
RB	2	(England) Joel Ward	(yellow card) 80'
CB	33	(Wales) Danny Gabbidon
CB	27	(Republic of Ireland) Damien Delaney
LB	21	(England) Dean Moxey	(yellow card) 104'
DM	15	(Australia) Mile Jedinak (c)	(yellow card) 28'
CM	8	(South Africa) Kagisho Dikgacoi		(substituted off) 18'
CM	10	(Republic of Ireland) Owen Garvan		(substituted off) 84'
RF	20	(Wales) Jonny Williams		(substituted off) 66'
CF	18	(England) Aaron Wilbraham
LF	16	(Ivory Coast) Wilfried Zaha
Substitutes:
GK	34	(England) Lewis Price
DF	3	(Wales) Jazz Richards
DF	28	(England) Peter Ramage
MF	7	(France) Yannick Bolasie
MF	22	(England) Stuart O'Keefe	(yellow card) 60'	(substituted on) 18'
MF	30	(Brazil) André Moritz		(substituted on) 84'
FW	9	(England) Kevin Phillips		(substituted on) 66'
Manager:
(England) Ian Holloway

GK	1	(Spain) Manuel Almunia (c)
RB	27	(Italy) Marco Cassetti	(yellow card) 105'
CB	12	(England) Lloyd Doyley
CB	40	(Sweden) Joel Ekstrand	(yellow card) 10'
LB	18	(Czech Republic) Daniel Pudil
DM	39	(England) Nathaniel Chalobah		(substituted off) 74'
DM	8	(England) Jonathan Hogg
CM	22	(Switzerland) Almen Abdi	(yellow card) 60'
RF	20	(Czech Republic) Matěj Vydra		(substituted off) 46'
CF	9	(England) Troy Deeney
LF	21	(Scotland) Ikechi Anya		(substituted off) 86'
Substitutes:
GK	30	(England) Jonathan Bond
DF	6	(England) Fitz Hall
DF	17	(England) Matthew Briggs
MF	7	(Republic of Ireland) Mark Yeates
MF	38	(Argentina) Cristian Battocchio		(substituted on) 74'
FW	36	(Switzerland) Alexandre Geijo		(substituted on) 46'
FW	41	(Argentina) Fernando Forestieri		(substituted on) 86'
Manager:
(Italy) Gianfranco Zola

Man of the Match:
Wilfried Zaha (Crystal Palace)

Assistant referees:
Stuart Burt
Peter Kirkup
Fourth official:
Neil Swarbrick

Match rules:

- 90 minutes.
- 30 minutes of extra time if necessary.
- Penalty shoot-out if scores still level.
- Seven named substitutes.
- Maximum of three substitutions.

=== Statistics ===
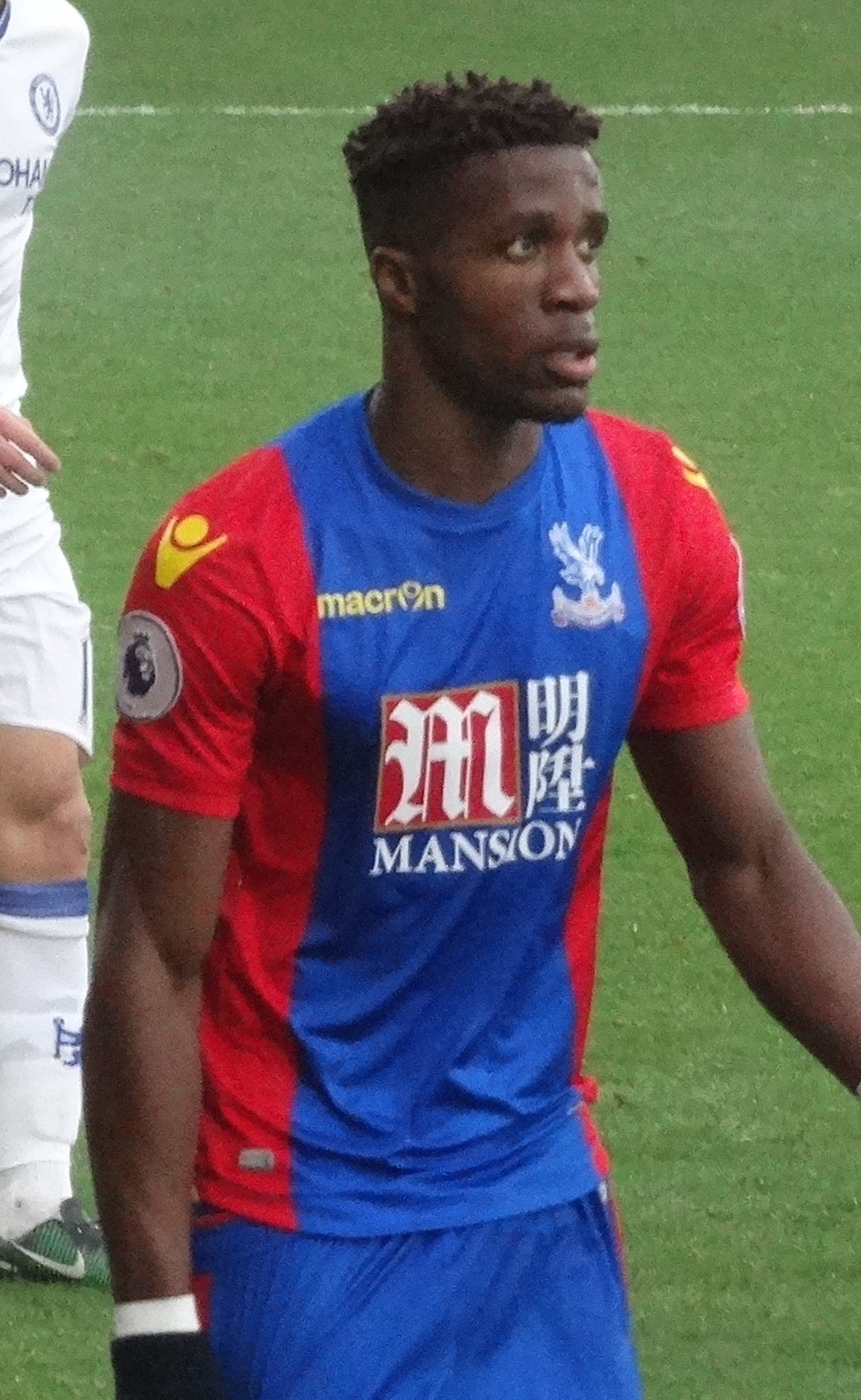
Wilfried Zaha (pictured in 2016) was named man of the match.

Statistics
	Crystal Palace	Watford
Total shots	12	15
Shots on target	10	9
Ball possession	52%	48%
Corner kicks	6	8
Fouls committed	12	13
Yellow cards	4	3
Red cards	0	0

== Post-match ==
Crystal Palace manager Ian Holloway said: "I've been very fortunate to have worked with some great players and I'm very grateful to this bunch. We're in the Premier League now and ... god help us. We battled hard." He went on to say "It all starts now for me because the minute we kick off next season we're on a hiding to nothing ... We've got to make sure we can compete and I want to stay there." Zola was gracious in defeat and conceded that Palace "played well and probably deserved it more than us, so congratulations to them ... I had no complaints about their penalty ... Wilfried Zaha made a huge difference." Phillips spoke of his winning penalty strike and his future: "I had in my mind where I wanted to take it, I was happy to take it. I picked my spot and stuck to it. I don't know if that's going to be my last match, but if it is, what a way to sign off." Zaha was named man of the match.

Crystal Palace ended the next season in 11th place in the Premier League, 12 points above the relegation zone. Watford finished the following season in 13th place, 16 points above the relegation zone but 12 points outside the play-offs.
