= Owen Garvan =

Irish footballer

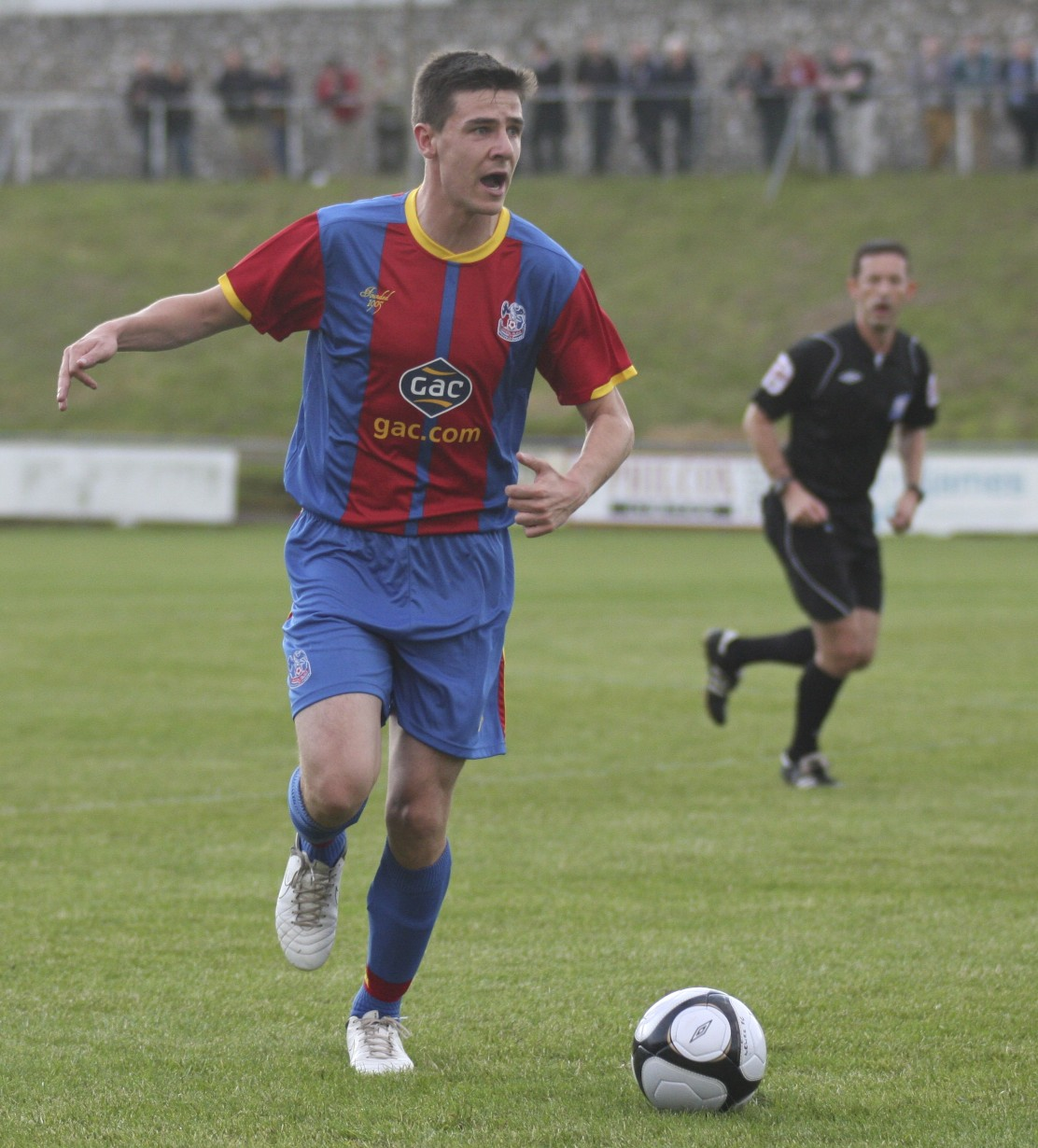
- Garvan playing for Crystal Palace in July 2012

Personal information
- Full name: Owen William Garvan
- Date of birth: 29 January 1988 (age 38)
- Place of birth: Dublin, Ireland
- Height: 1.83 m (6 ft 0 in)
- Position: Midfielder

Youth career
- –2004: Home Farm
- 2004–2005: Ipswich Town

Senior career*
Years	Team	Apps	(Gls)
2005–2010	Ipswich Town	163	(13)
2010–2015	Crystal Palace	77	(10)
2014	→ Millwall (loan)	13	(0)
2014	→ Bolton Wanderers (loan)	3	(0)
2015–2017	Colchester United	50	(2)
2017–2018	St Patrick's Athletic	19	(0)
Total		325	(25)

International career
- Republic of Ireland U15
–2004	Republic of Ireland U16		
2004–2005	Republic of Ireland U17		
2005–2006	Republic of Ireland U19		
2007–2010	Republic of Ireland U21	15	(4)
- * Club domestic league appearances and goals

Owen William Garvan (born 29 January 1988) is an Irish former professional footballer who played as a midfielder.

Garvan began his career in his native Ireland where he played for Home Farm as a schoolboy. He earned a move to England with Ipswich Town in 2004, where he helped his side to the FA Youth Cup Final in 2005. He made his professional debut in the 2005–06 season and went on to make 174 appearances for the club, scoring 15 goals. After falling out of favour under Ipswich manager Roy Keane, Garvan moved to Crystal Palace in 2010.

Garvan was a member of the Crystal Palace side that earned promotion to the Premier League in 2013 following a 1–0 win over Watford in the play-off final. He made a handful of Premier League appearances, but was eventually loaned out to Millwall during the same season, and then Bolton Wanderers the following season. When his contract expired after five years with Palace where he had amassed 87 appearances and 11 goals, he joined League One club Colchester United in August 2015. He played 53 times and scored twice for Colchester before leaving in April 2017. Garvan returned to his native country and joined Dublin-based side St Patrick's Athletic in July 2017. He spent one season there before leaving the club by mutual consent. Garvan announced his retirement from football in 2020 which was effectively backdated to 2018 meaning he had played his final match at the age of 30.

Garvan represented the Republic of Ireland at under-15, under-17, under-19 and under-21 levels. He scored four goals in 15 under-21 appearances between 2007 and 2010.

== Club career ==
=== Home Farm ===
Born in Dublin, Garvan grew up playing for Home Farm in a team coached by his father, Gerry Garvan. His side went undefeated for three years, and were notable for beating a Celtic youth side in Glasgow, a match in which four members of the side ended up joining Celtic. Darren O'Dea, Diarmuid O'Carroll, Gareth Christie and Gareth Walsh were all offered contracts by Celtic, while Chris McCann moved to England to join Burnley. Garvan also made a move, joining Ipswich Town along with teammates Shane Supple and Michael Synnott.

=== Ipswich Town ===
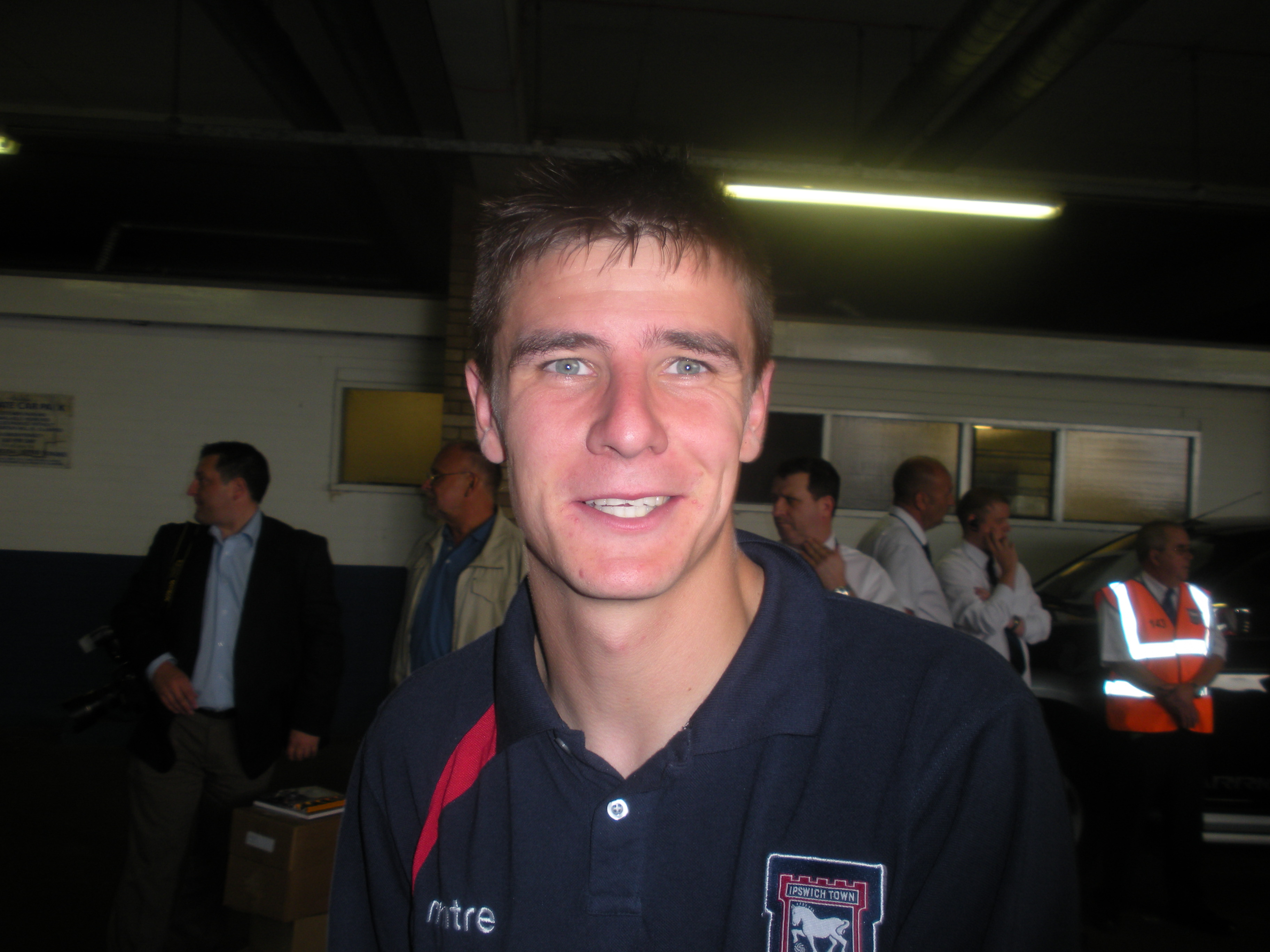
Garvan with Ipswich Town in August 2009.

Garvan moved to Ipswich Town in November 2004, where he immediately became a regular in the Ipswich youth teams, helping his side to the final of the FA Youth Cup in 2005. He missed the second leg of the final against Southampton after spending the match day in hospital with a viral infection.

Following his success with the youth team, Garvan was handed his professional debut on 6 August 2005, starting in Ipswich's season opening 1–0 win over Cardiff City at Portman Road. He established himself as a first-team regular in Joe Royle's side, scoring his first goal for the club in a 2–2 draw with Southampton on 13 September. He ended his first season with three goals in 33 games.

In the 2006–07 season, Garvan received the first professional red card of his career after being sent off for a second bookable offence during a 2–0 home defeat by Leicester City on 10 February 2007. He scored once in his 29 games for the club during the season, scoring the opening goal in a 3–0 win over Plymouth Argyle on 31 March 2007. He then made 45 appearances during the 2007–08 season, where he scored three goals.

Garvan continued to hold down a regular starting berth in the 2008–09 season by making 39 appearances and scoring seven times. However, under new Ipswich manager Roy Keane, Garvan found first-team appearances scarce, as he went on to make just 28 appearances in 2009–10 following two seasons of regular first-team football under his previous manager and fellow countryman Jim Magilton. He scored one goal during the campaign with the winner in Ipswich's 2–1 FA Cup third round win at Blackpool on 2 January 2010.

At the end of the 2009–10 season, Keane deemed Garvan surplus to requirements and placed him on the transfer list. He had made 174 appearances for Ipswich in all competitions.

=== Crystal Palace ===
After being subject to a £150,000 bid from Ipswich's Championship rivals Crystal Palace in July 2010, Garvan signed for the club for an undisclosed fee on 3 August 2010. He made his debut four days later in Palace's 3–2 home win against Leicester City. He scored his first goal for his new side on 23 October in a 4–3 defeat at Preston North End. He was sent off against Sheffield United on 20 November for a second bookable offence. He ended the season with 28 appearances for Palace.

Garvan made just 23 appearances during the 2011–12 season, but the 2012–13 campaign proved to be much more successful for him. In addition to making 32 outings, he scored four times to help his side to the play-offs and reach the Wembley final. He played for 84 minutes in the play-off final against Watford on 27 May 2013. His side won 1–0 in extra time courtesy of a Kevin Phillips penalty. Immediately following Palace's play-off success, he and teammate Peter Ramage signed new two-year deals to remain with the club until 2015.

On 18 August 2013, Garvan made his first Premier League appearance when he started in Palace's 1–0 home defeat by Tottenham Hotspur, playing 66 minutes before being replaced. He made just one further league appearance that season as a substitute for José Campaña in his side's 2–1 defeat at Stoke City on 24 August, before scoring a late consolation goal in what would be his final game of the season for the club three days later in a 2–1 defeat to Bristol City in the League Cup.

==== Loan to Millwall ====
After falling of favour with manager Ian Holloway at Crystal Palace, Garvan failed to make an appearance for the first team for the remainder of the 2013–14 season. With Holloway leaving Palace by mutual consent in October 2013 and joining Millwall in January 2014, Garvan remained out of contention under Tony Pulis, before being allowed to leave to join Millwall on an emergency loan deal on 28 February 2014.

Garvan made his Millwall debut at The Den on 1 March in their 1–0 defeat by Brighton & Hove Albion. He made 13 league appearances for the club as they battled against relegation to League One, surviving by four points.

==== Loan to Bolton Wanderers ====
Having made what would be his final appearance for his parent club in the League Cup on 26 August 2014, Garvan was once again loaned out to a Championship club, joining Bolton Wanderers for three months on 10 September. He made his debut on 13 September in a 0–0 home draw with Sheffield Wednesday, and went on to make three appearances.

=== Colchester United ===
After being released at the end of his Crystal Palace contract, Garvan spent the summer of 2015 training with a number of teams, including his former employer Ipswich Town, Southend United and Motherwell in search of a new club. On 27 August 2015, Garvan signed a short-term deal with League One side Colchester United until January. He made his debut two days later as a half-time substitute for Joe Edwards as Colchester drew 2–2 with Scunthorpe United at the Colchester Community Stadium.

Just one month after signing his short-term deal with the Essex side, on 25 September, Garvan agreed a contract extension that would keep him with the U's until the summer of 2017. He scored his first goal for Colchester on 24 October during their 4–4 home draw with Walsall, his first league goal since the 2012–13 season. Garvan was handed the club captaincy by manager Kevin Keen on 19 February 2016 from Chris Porter "for the foreseeable future" and to "take a little of the responsibility off him [Porter]". He ended the season with one goal in 35 appearances for the U's.

Garvan was replaced by Luke Prosser as captain by new manager John McGreal in August 2016 ahead of the 2016–17 season. Injury impeded his start to the new season. After initially recovering from injury in late August, he suffered a recurrence during training that continued to keep him out of action. He made his first appearance of the season on 22 November, providing an assist for Tom Eastman's goal in Colchester's 3–0 win at Cheltenham Town. He scored in his second game of the season on 26 November during Colchester's 4–0 home win over Crewe Alexandra.

After amassing 53 appearances, Garvan left Colchester by mutual consent on 11 April 2017 as his contract was cancelled citing personal reasons.

=== St Patrick's Athletic ===
On 2 July 2017, it was announced that Garvan had returned home to his native Dublin, signing for Premier Division club St Patrick's Athletic, alongside Killian Brennan. He made his debut in a friendly three days later in a 1–0 win over Scottish Premiership side Heart of Midlothian at Richmond Park. Four days later, Garvan made his league debut for St Pats in a 1–0 defeat to Cork City, but was sent off after an incident in the tunnel at half time. On 5 June 2018, Garvan left St Pats by mutual consent. On 6 April 2020, Garvan announced that he had retired in 2018 after leaving St Pats because he was disheartened by the industry.

== International career ==
Garvan has represented the Republic of Ireland at under-15, under-16, under-17, under-19 and under-21 levels. He won the FAI Under-21 International Player of the Year award in 2008. He was included in Giovanni Trapattoni's first Republic of Ireland squad in 2008.

== Personal life ==
Garvan comes from a notable Irish footballing family. His father Gerry was a player in the League of Ireland and coached Owen during his days with Home Farm in Dublin. Garvan's uncle Mick Martin made 51 appearances for Ireland between 1971 and 1983 and played for Manchester United.

Garvan's grandfather Con Martin was also an Irish international footballer who had the notable distinction of having been capped in every position for the team, including as goalkeeper. However, he turned down a move to Manchester United because Matt Busby wanted Martin to play in goal. Martin made over 190 league appearances for Aston Villa between 1948 and 1956. Another uncle, Con Martin Jr, was also a League of Ireland player.

== Career statistics ==
Appearances and goals by club, season and competition
Club	Season	League			National Cup		League Cup		Other		Total	
Club	Season	Division	Apps	Goals	Apps	Goals	Apps	Goals	Apps	Goals	Apps	Goals
Ipswich Town	2005–06	Championship	31	3	1	0	1	0	—		33	3
Ipswich Town	2006–07	Championship	27	1	2	0	0	0	—		29	1
Ipswich Town	2007–08	Championship	43	2	1	0	1	1	—		45	3
Ipswich Town	2008–09	Championship	37	7	1	0	1	0	—		39	7
Ipswich Town	2009–10	Championship	25	0	2	1	1	0	—		28	1
Ipswich Town	Total		163	13	7	1	4	1	0	0	174	15
Crystal Palace	2010–11	Championship	26	3	1	0	1	0	—		28	3
Crystal Palace	2011–12	Championship	22	3	1	0	0	0	—		23	3
Crystal Palace	2012–13	Championship	27	4	0	0	2	0	3 (Note: Appearances in Football League Championship play-offs)	0	32	4
Crystal Palace	2013–14	Premier League	2	0	0	0	1	1	—		3	1
Crystal Palace	2014–15	Premier League	0	0	0	0	1	0	—		1	0
Crystal Palace	Total		77	10	2	0	5	1	3	0	87	11
Millwall (loan)	2013–14	Championship	13	0	—		—		—		13	0
Bolton Wanderers (loan)	2014–15	Championship	3	0	—		—		—		3	0
Colchester United	2015–16	League One	32	1	2	0	0	0	1 (Note: Appearance in Football League Trophy)	0	35	1
Colchester United	2016–17	League Two	18	1	0	0	0	0	0	0	18	1
Colchester United	Total		50	2	2	0	0	0	1	0	53	2
St Patrick's Athletic	2017	LOI Premier Division	9	0	1	0	—		0	0	10	0
St Patrick's Athletic	2018	LOI Premier Division	10	0	0	0	0	0	1 (Note: Appearance in Leinster Senior Cup)	0	11	0
St Patrick's Athletic	Total		19	0	1	0	0	0	1	0	21	0
Career total			325	25	12	1	9	2	5	0	351	28

== Honours ==
Ipswich Town U18

- FA Youth Cup: 2004–05

Crystal Palace

- Football League Championship play-offs: 2013

Individual

- FAI Under-21 International Player of the Year: 2008

Sporting positions
Preceded by Chris Porter	Colchester United captain 2016	Succeeded by Luke Prosser
