= Yannick Bolasie =

French footballer (born 1989)

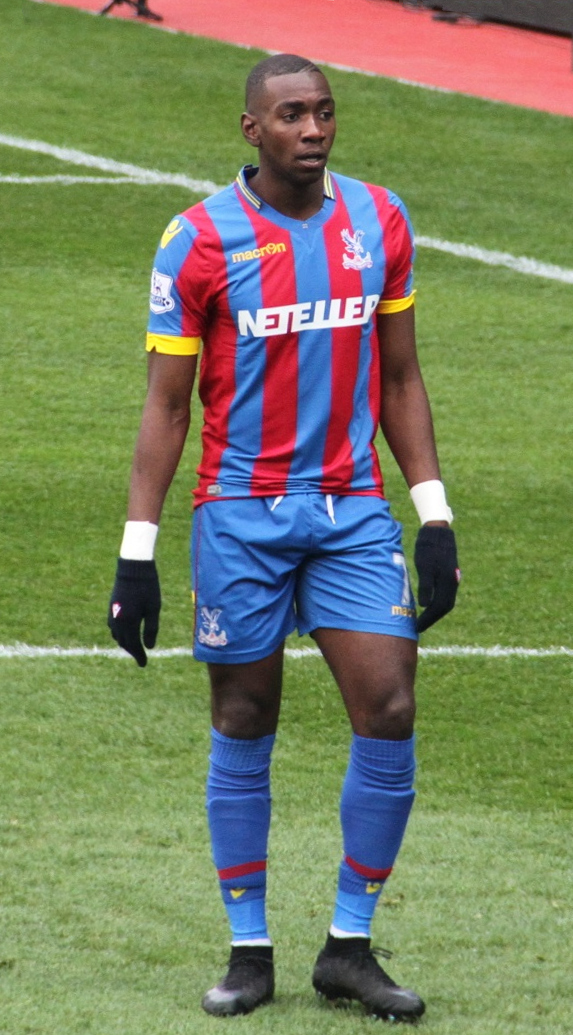
- Bolasie playing for Crystal Palace in 2015

Personal information
- Full name: Yannick Bolasie
- Date of birth: 24 May 1989 (age 37)
- Place of birth: Lyon, France
- Height: 1.88 m (6 ft 2 in)
- Position: Winger

Team information
- Current team: Chapecoense
- Number: 11

Youth career
- Rushden & Diamonds

Senior career*
| Years | Team | Apps | (Gls) |
| 2006–2007 | Hillingdon Borough | 5 | (0) |
| 2007–2008 | Floriana | 24 | (4) |
| 2008–2011 | Plymouth Argyle | 51 | (8) |
| 2008–2009 | → Rushden & Diamonds (loan) | 7 | (0) |
| 2009–2010 | → Barnet (loan) | 42 | (5) |
| 2011–2012 | Bristol City | 23 | (1) |
| 2012–2016 | Crystal Palace | 133 | (12) |
| 2016–2021 | Everton | 29 | (2) |
| 2018–2019 | → Aston Villa (loan) | 21 | (2) |
| 2019 | → Anderlecht (loan) | 17 | (6) |
| 2019–2020 | → Sporting CP (loan) | 14 | (1) |
| 2021 | → Middlesbrough (loan) | 15 | (3) |
| 2021–2023 | Çaykur Rizespor | 53 | (19) |
| 2023–2024 | Swansea City | 10 | (0) |
| 2024 | Criciúma | 34 | (8) |
| 2025 | Cruzeiro | 28 | (3) |
| 2026– | Chapecoense | 23 | (1) |

International career^{‡}
| 2013–2022 | DR Congo | 50 | (9) |
- * Club domestic league appearances and goals as of 23:51, 19 September 2026 (UTC) ‡ National team caps and goals as of 23:59, 25 March 2022 (UTC)

Yannick Bolasie (born 24 May 1989) is a professional footballer who plays as a winger for Campeonato Brasileiro Série A club Chapecoense.

He has played in the English football pyramid for Plymouth Argyle, Barnet, Bristol City, Crystal Palace, Everton, Aston Villa, Middlesbrough and Swansea City.

Born in France and raised in England, he earned 50 caps for the DR Congo national team between 2013 and 2022.

== Club career ==
=== Early career ===
Bolasie began his career with Rushden & Diamonds at age 16. He spent four months as a member of their youth team and then had a spell with Hillingdon Borough in the Southern Football League before moving across Europe to play for Floriana in the Maltese Premier League. He returned to England in 2008 after being offered a trial with Plymouth Argyle and impressed enough to be offered a two-year contract. He joined Dagenham & Redbridge on trial with a view to a loan move before returning to Rushden & Diamonds on loan near the end of the year. He made his debut against Eastbourne Borough on 29 November, and made seven appearances in the Conference before returning to Argyle in January 2009. Bolasie then joined Barnet on loan, making his Football League debut against Accrington Stanley on 24 January 2009. He scored his first goal two weeks later, opening the scoring in a 3–3 draw against Grimsby Town.

Bolasie returned to Argyle at the end of the 2008–09 season having made 20 league appearances for Barnet, scoring three goals. The club's manager, Ian Hendon, was keen to bring Bolasie back, but dismissed the chances of signing him permanently. Hendon said, "Yannick is still under contract at Plymouth, so it is likely that he will return there at the end of the season." He rejoined the Barnet squad in July 2009 ahead of the new season on a six-month loan, and hoped it would act as a springboard to winning a place in the Argyle first team. Bolasie scored against Grimsby again in October 2009, capping a fine display with a fierce shot from 30 yards Bolasie scored his second goal of the season three weeks later against Darlington, as Hendon's side maintained a place in the top half of the League Two table.

=== Plymouth Argyle ===
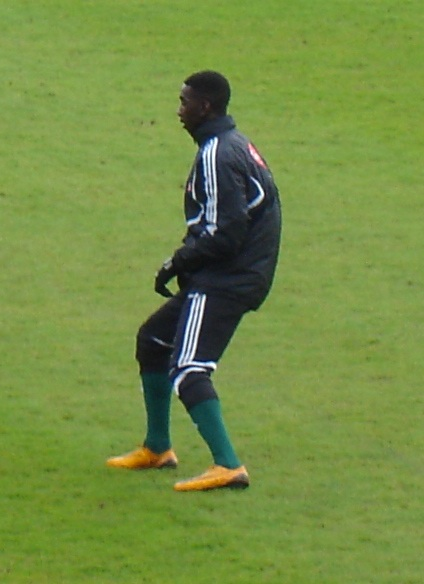
Bolasie training with Plymouth Argyle in 2010

Bolasie returned to Plymouth Argyle in January 2010, having made a further 22 league appearances for Barnet, scoring twice. He was given a chance to impress by Paul Mariner, who had succeeded Sturrock a month earlier, and included him in the squad to take on Barnsley on 13 February 2010. He made his debut for the club in that game, coming off the substitute bench to provide the momentum to turn a one nil deficit into a 3–1 win for the visitors. He scored his first goal for the club two weeks later at Sheffield United. The pacy winger, ended the season with 16 Championship appearances to his name, but could not prevent the club from being relegated to League One. Bolasie was offered a new contract by the club in April 2010, and Bolasie signed it in July after the arrival of Peter Reid as the club's new manager.

=== Bristol City ===
Bolasie was transferred to Bristol City on 6 June 2011 for an undisclosed fee and signed a two-year contract. He scored his first goal for the club in a 3–1 win against Coventry City on 9 April 2012. Prior to the match against Barnsley later that month, Bolasie was named Young Player of the Year by the Supporters Club and Trust after a fans vote. He submitted a written transfer request in August 2012 because he wanted to move back to London.

=== Crystal Palace ===
In August 2012, Bolasie signed a three-year contract with Crystal Palace for an undisclosed fee. He made his debut in a 2–1 defeat at Middlesbrough, and scored his first goal for Palace in a 5–0 home win against Ipswich Town. He was an unused substitute for Palace in the 2013 Football League Championship play-off final as the Eagles defeated Watford 1–0 to gain promotion to the Premier League for the 2013–14 season.

Bolasie made his Premier League debut as a substitute against Liverpool at Anfield on 5 October 2013. He was sent-off in the 78th minute of a 1–0 win at Hull City on 23 November 2013, and scored his first Premier League goal in a 3–2 win over Everton at Goodison Park on 21 September 2014. On 11 April 2015, Bolasie scored an 11-minute hat-trick against Sunderland in a 4–1 win at the Stadium of Light, becoming the first Crystal Palace player to score a hat-trick in the Premier League. He signed a new three-and-a-half-year deal for Crystal Palace early in the 2015–16 season. While at Crystal Palace, Bolasie was represented by John Sorzano.

=== Everton ===
On 15 August 2016, Bolasie joined Everton for a reported £25 million transfer fee. He made his debut as a substitute in a 2–1 win away against West Bromwich Albion five days later, and three days after that made his first start for Everton, in a 4–0 EFL Cup win at home to Yeovil Town. Bolasie sustained an injury to his right anterior cruciate ligament in a 1–1 draw with Manchester United on 4 December 2016, and was out injured until 26 December 2017. On 2 October 2020, manager Carlo Ancelotti said that although Bolasie was training well, he was not in his plans and was free to leave the club. He left the club in June 2021.

==== Loans ====
Bolasie signed for Aston Villa on a season-long loan in August 2018, but returned, early, the following January, before being loaned to Belgian side Anderlecht for the remainder of the 2018–19 season. In September 2019 he joined Portuguese club Sporting CP on loan for the 2019–20 season. On 28 January 2021, Bolasie moved to EFL Championship club Middlesbrough, on a loan deal until the end of the season. He scored his first goal for Middlesbrough on 5 April 2021 in a 1–1 draw with Watford.

=== Caykur Rizespor ===
In August 2021, Bolasie moved to Turkey to join Süper Lig club Çaykur Rizespor. In his 53 games for the club, Bolasie scored 19 goals, with him finishing third in the top scorer race in the 2022–23 TFF First League, which helped Rizespor back into the Süper Lig immediately after their relegation.

=== Swansea City ===
On 27 November 2023, Bolasie signed a short-term contract with EFL Championship club Swansea City. Though head coach Luke Williams appeared keen to retain Bolasie, they were unable to agree on a contract extension. He departed the club on 29 January 2024, having not scored any goals for the club.

=== Brazil ===
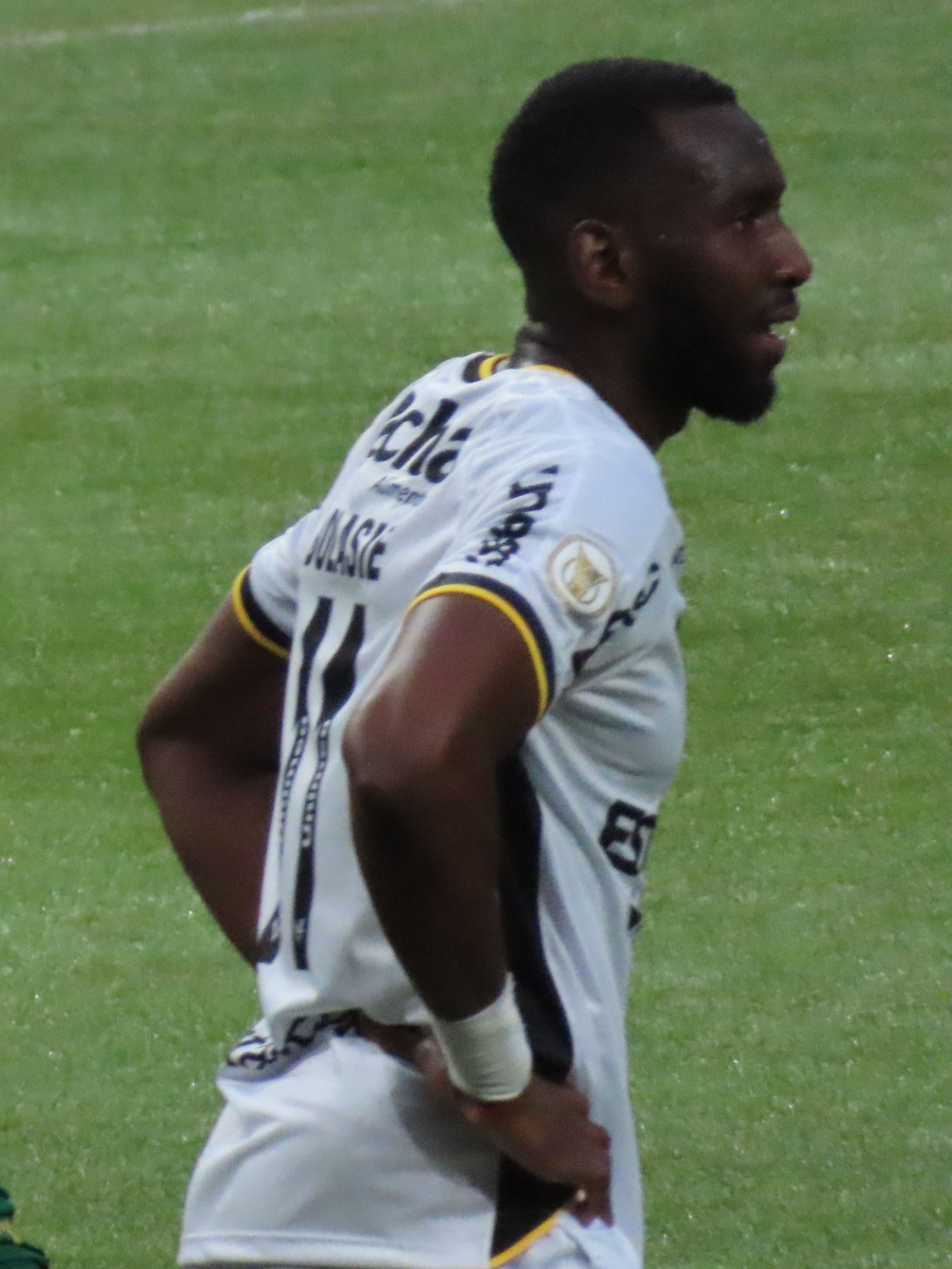
Bolasie with Criciúma in September 2024

In March 2024, Bolasie joined Brazilian club Criciúma. Through July, he scored two goals and provided two assists in thirteen matches. On 27 December 2024, after a successful stint at Criciúma, it was announced that Bolasie would play for Cruzeiro in the 2025 season. On 11 January 2026, he signed a one-year contract with recently promoted Série A side Chapecoense.

== International career ==
Bolasie was eligible to represent France, England and DR Congo internationally through birth, upbringing and heritage respectively. In January 2013 while playing in the Championship for Crystal Palace, Bolasie rejected the chance to represent the DR Congo in the 2013 Africa Cup of Nations claiming that he did not want to disrupt making progress in his club career. In March 2013, Bolasie was again called up to the Democratic Republic of Congo squad, and made his international debut in a 2014 World Cup qualification 0–0 draw with Libya.

Bolasie was selected in the Congolese squad for the 2015 Africa Cup of Nations in Equatorial Guinea. He scored the equaliser in their first group game, a 1–1 draw against Zambia at the Estadio de Ebibeyin on 18 January. The team finished in third place.

== Personal life ==
His parents were born in Zaire, now the Democratic Republic of the Congo. Bolasie was born in the French city of Lyon, but moved to England when he was seven months old and grew up in the London borough of Brent. Lomana LuaLua, Kazenga LuaLua and Trésor Kandol are his cousins. His younger brother Ruddock Yala is a footballer, who played for Harrow Borough, Grays Athletic, Boreham Wood and Maldon & Tiptree.

Bolasie holds an active interest in grime music. In 2014, he filmed a rap battle with fellow professional footballer Bradley Wright-Phillips for the long running grime DVD series Lord of the Mics.

== Career statistics ==
=== Club ===
As of match played 19 September 2026

Appearances and goals by club, season and competition
| Club | Season | League | | | National cup (Note: Includes FA Cup, Taça de Portugal, Turkish Cup, Copa do Brasil) | | League cup (Note: Includes Taça da Liga, Football League Cup) | | Other | | Total | |
| Club | Season | Division | Apps | Goals | Apps | Goals | Apps | Goals | Apps | Goals | Apps | Goals |
|---|---|---|---|---|---|---|---|---|---|---|---|---|
| Hillingdon Borough | 2006–07 | Southern League | 5 | 0 | 0 | 0 | — | | — | | 5 | 0 |
| Floriana | 2007–08 | Maltese Premier League | 24 | 4 | 0 | 0 | — | | — | | 24 | 4 |
| Plymouth Argyle | 2008–09 | Championship | 0 | 0 | 0 | 0 | 0 | 0 | — | | 0 | 0 |
| Plymouth Argyle | 2009–10 | Championship | 16 | 1 | 0 | 0 | 0 | 0 | — | | 16 | 1 |
| Plymouth Argyle | 2010–11 | League One | 35 | 7 | 1 | 0 | 0 | 0 | 2 (Note: Appearances in Football League Trophy) | 0 | 38 | 7 |
| Plymouth Argyle | Total | | 51 | 8 | 1 | 0 | 0 | 0 | 2 | 0 | 54 | 8 |
| Rushden & Diamonds (loan) | 2008–09 | Conference Premier | 7 | 0 | 0 | 0 | — | | 3 (Note: Appearances in FA Trophy) | 0 | 10 | 0 |
| Barnet (loan) | 2008–09 | League Two | 20 | 3 | 0 | 0 | 0 | 0 | 0 | 0 | 20 | 3 |
| Barnet (loan) | 2009–10 | League Two | 22 | 2 | 3 | 0 | 1 | 0 | 2 | 0 | 28 | 2 |
| Barnet (loan) | Total | | 42 | 5 | 3 | 0 | 1 | 0 | 2 | 0 | 48 | 5 |
| Bristol City | 2011–12 | Championship | 23 | 1 | 1 | 0 | 0 | 0 | — | | 24 | 1 |
| Bristol City | 2012–13 | Championship | 0 | 0 | 0 | 0 | 1 | 0 | — | | 1 | 0 |
| Bristol City | Total | | 23 | 1 | 1 | 0 | 1 | 0 | — | | 25 | 1 |
| Crystal Palace | 2012–13 | Championship | 43 | 3 | 2 | 0 | 0 | 0 | 2 (Note: Appearances in Championship play-offs) | 0 | 47 | 3 |
| Crystal Palace | 2013–14 | Premier League | 29 | 0 | 1 | 0 | 0 | 0 | — | | 30 | 0 |
| Crystal Palace | 2014–15 | Premier League | 34 | 4 | 1 | 0 | 0 | 0 | — | | 35 | 4 |
| Crystal Palace | 2015–16 | Premier League | 26 | 5 | 4 | 1 | 1 | 0 | — | | 31 | 6 |
| Crystal Palace | 2016–17 | Premier League | 1 | 0 | 0 | 0 | 0 | 0 | — | | 1 | 0 |
| Crystal Palace | Total | | 133 | 12 | 8 | 1 | 1 | 0 | 2 | 0 | 144 | 13 |
| Everton | 2016–17 | Premier League | 13 | 1 | 0 | 0 | 2 | 0 | — | | 15 | 1 |
| Everton | 2017–18 | Premier League | 16 | 1 | 1 | 0 | 0 | 0 | — | | 17 | 1 |
| Everton | Total | | 29 | 2 | 1 | 0 | 2 | 0 | — | | 32 | 2 |
| Aston Villa (loan) | 2018–19 | Championship | 21 | 2 | 0 | 0 | 0 | 0 | — | | 21 | 2 |
| Anderlecht (loan) | 2018–19 | Belgian Pro League | 17 | 6 | 0 | 0 | — | | 0 | 0 | 17 | 6 |
| Sporting CP (loan) | 2019–20 | Primeira Liga | 14 | 1 | 1 | 0 | 3 | 0 | 7 (Note: Appearances in UEFA Europa League) | 1 | 25 | 2 |
| Middlesbrough (loan) | 2020–21 | Championship | 15 | 3 | — | | — | | — | | 15 | 3 |
| Çaykur Rizespor | 2021–22 | Süper Lig | 27 | 2 | 0 | 0 | — | | — | | 27 | 2 |
| Çaykur Rizespor | 2022–23 | TFF First League | 26 | 17 | 2 | 1 | — | | — | | 28 | 18 |
| Çaykur Rizespor | Total | | 53 | 19 | 2 | 1 | — | | — | | 55 | 20 |
| Swansea City | 2023–24 | Championship | 10 | 0 | 2 | 0 | 0 | 0 | — | | 12 | 0 |
| Criciúma | 2024 | Série A | 34 | 8 | 2 | 0 | — | | — | | 36 | 8 |
| Cruzeiro | 2025 | Série A | 18 | 0 | 2 | 0 | — | | 13 (Note: Ten appearances and three goals in Campeonato Mineiro, three appearances and one goal in Copa Sudamericana) | 4 | 33 | 4 |
| Chapecoense | 2026 | Série A | 20 | 1 | 2 | 1 | — | | 6 (Note: Three appearances in Campeonato Catarinense, three appearances in Copa Sul-Sudeste) | 0 | 28 | 2 |
| Career total | | | 516 | 72 | 25 | 3 | 8 | 0 | 35 | 5 | 584 | 80 |

=== International ===
As of match played 25 March 2022

International statistics
| National team | Year | Apps | Goals |
|---|---|---|---|
| DR Congo | 2013 | 3 | 0 |
| DR Congo | 2014 | 6 | 2 |
| DR Congo | 2015 | 15 | 4 |
| DR Congo | 2016 | 7 | 2 |
| DR Congo | 2017 | 0 | 0 |
| DR Congo | 2018 | 4 | 1 |
| DR Congo | 2019 | 7 | 0 |
| DR Congo | 2020 | 2 | 0 |
| DR Congo | 2021 | 4 | 0 |
| DR Congo | 2022 | 2 | 0 |
| Total | | 50 | 9 |

As of match played 25 March 2022
DR Congo score listed first, score column indicates score after each Bolasie goal

List of international goals scored by Yannick Bolasie
| No. | Date | Venue | Opponent | Score | Result | Competition |
|---|---|---|---|---|---|---|
| 1 | 19 November 2014 | Stade Tata Raphaël, Kinshasa, DR Congo | Sierra Leone | 1–1 | 3–1 | 2015 Africa Cup of Nations qualification |
| 2 | 19 November 2014 | Stade Tata Raphaël, Kinshasa, DR Congo | Sierra Leone | 3–1 | 3–1 | 2015 Africa Cup of Nations qualification |
| 3 | 7 January 2015 | Stade Ahmadou Ahidjo, Yaoundé, Cameroon | Cameroon | 1–1 | 1–1 | Friendly |
| 4 | 18 January 2015 | Estadio de Ebibeyin, Ebibeyin, Equatorial Guinea | Zambia | 1–1 | 1–1 | 2015 Africa Cup of Nations |
| 5 | 12 November 2015 | Prince Louis Rwagasore Stadium, Bujumbura, Burundi | Burundi | 1–0 | 3–2 | 2018 FIFA World Cup qualification |
| 6 | 15 November 2015 | Stade des Martyrs, Kinshasa, DR Congo | Burundi | 2–0 | 3–0 | 2018 FIFA World Cup qualification |
| 7 | 5 June 2016 | Rabemananjara Stadium, Mahajanga, Madagascar | Madagascar | 3–0 | 6–1 | 2017 Africa Cup of Nations qualification |
| 8 | 13 November 2016 | Stade du 28 Septembre, Conakry, Guinea | Guinea | 2–1 | 2–1 | 2018 FIFA World Cup qualification |
| 9 | 13 October 2018 | Stade des Martyrs, Kinshasa, DR Congo | Zimbabwe | 1–2 | 1–2 | 2019 Africa Cup of Nations qualification |

== Honours ==
Crystal Palace

- Football League Championship play-offs: 2013
- FA Cup runner-up: 2015–16

Individual

- PFA Team of the Year: 2012–13 Championship
