= 2012–13 Football League Championship =

Football League Championship
- Season: 2012–13
- Champions: Cardiff City; 1st Championship title 1st 2nd tier title
- Promoted: Cardiff City; Hull City; Crystal Palace
- Relegated: Peterborough United; Wolverhampton Wanderers; Bristol City
- Matches: 552
- Goals: 1,494 (2.71 per match)
- Top goalscorer: Glenn Murray ~ 30 goals
- Biggest home win: Blackpool 6–0 Ipswich Town; Leicester City 6–0 Ipswich Town
- Biggest away win: Barnsley 0–6 Charlton Athletic
- Highest scoring: (9 goals); Charlton Athletic 5–4 Cardiff City; Peterborough United 5–4 Bolton Wanderers
- Longest winning run: 6 games Nottingham Forest
- Longest unbeaten run: 14 games Crystal Palace
- Longest winless run: 12 games Huddersfield Town; Wolverhampton Wanderers
- Longest losing run: 7 games Bristol City; Peterborough United; Sheffield Wednesday
- Highest attendance: 33,010; Derby County v Nottingham Forest
- Lowest attendance: 5,435; Peterborough United v Bristol City
- Average attendance: 17,331

The 2012–13 Football League Championship (known as the npower Championship for sponsorship reasons) was the ninth season of the league under its current title and twentieth season under its current league division format. The season began on 17 August 2012 with promotion candidates Cardiff City hosting newly promoted Huddersfield Town at Cardiff City Stadium and finished on 27 May 2013 with the play-off final.

Of the 24 teams which participate, eighteen of these remain following the 2011–12 Football League Championship. They were joined by Charlton Athletic, Sheffield Wednesday and Huddersfield Town from 2011–12 Football League One, and Blackburn Rovers, Bolton Wanderers and Wolverhampton Wanderers from the 2011–12 Premier League. The final place was decided on 26 May 2012, as Huddersfield Town defeated Sheffield United 8–7 on penalties, in the 2012 Football League One play-off final.

Cardiff City won the league in their first season since a controversial rebrand; they achieved promotion to the top flight for the first time since 1960 and became the second Welsh club to play in the Premier League. The second automatic promotion spot was won by Hull City with a 2–2 draw against Cardiff on the final day after a dramatic finale to the season. Watford, just two points behind, had to settle for a place in the playoffs, joining Brighton & Hove Albion, Crystal Palace, and Leicester City, who secured their place with a last-minute goal over rivals Nottingham Forest. In the playoffs, Watford defeated Leicester City 3–2, Crystal Palace defeated Brighton 2–0, and in the final Watford was upset by Crystal Palace to gain the promotion. Bristol City, Wolverhampton Wanderers, and Peterborough United were relegated. Peterborough gained 54 points, the highest ever for a relegated team in Championship history. Wolves' relegation was the first time a team had been relegated from the top tier to the third tier in consecutive seasons since Swindon Town in 1994 and 1995. They also became the first team to suffer this fate twice.

== Changes from last season ==
=== Team changes ===
==== To Championship ====
Promoted from League One

- Charlton Athletic
- Sheffield Wednesday
- Huddersfield Town

Relegated from Premier League

- Wolverhampton Wanderers
- Blackburn Rovers
- Bolton Wanderers

==== From Championship ====
Promoted to Premier League

- Reading
- Southampton
- West Ham United

Relegated to League One

- Doncaster Rovers
- Coventry City
- Portsmouth

=== Rules changes ===
On 25 April 2012, it was announced that financial fair play rules would be introduced for teams within The Championship. This means that clubs have agreed to new rules on sustainable financing which includes:

- Acceptable losses of £4 million in the 2011–12 and 2012–13 seasons, reducing to £2 million in 2015–16 season
- Acceptable amounts of shareholder investment of £8 million in the 2011–12 season, £6 million in the 2012–13 season, reducing to £3 million in 2015–16 season
- New rules on providing accounts
- New penalties for teams that fail to abide by the rules

Also the 2011–12 season saw Football League clubs vote for five substitutes instead of seven. However, on 1 June 2012, Football League clubs re-voted with the outcome of seven substitutes instead of five, ahead of the 2012–13 Football League season.

== Team overview ==
=== Stadia and locations ===
Locations of teams in the 2012–13 Football League Championship

Team	Location	Stadium	Capacity
Barnsley	Barnsley	Oakwell	23,009
Birmingham City	Birmingham	St Andrew's	30,079
Blackburn Rovers	Blackburn	Ewood Park	31,154
Blackpool	Blackpool	Bloomfield Road	17,338
Bolton Wanderers	Bolton	Reebok Stadium	28,100
Brighton & Hove Albion	Brighton	Falmer Stadium	30,750
Bristol City	Bristol	Ashton Gate	21,497
Burnley	Burnley	Turf Moor	22,546
Cardiff City	Cardiff	Cardiff City Stadium	26,828
Charlton Athletic	Charlton, London	The Valley	27,111
Crystal Palace	South Norwood, London	Selhurst Park	26,309
Derby County	Derby	Pride Park Stadium	33,597
Huddersfield Town	Huddersfield	John Smith's Stadium	24,500
Hull City	Kingston upon Hull	KC Stadium	25,586
Ipswich Town	Ipswich	Portman Road	30,311
Leeds United	Leeds	Elland Road	39,460
Leicester City	Leicester	King Power Stadium	32,500
Middlesbrough	Middlesbrough	Riverside Stadium	34,988
Millwall	South Bermondsey, London	The Den	20,146
Nottingham Forest	Nottingham	City Ground	30,576
Peterborough United	Peterborough	London Road Stadium	15,460
Sheffield Wednesday	Sheffield	Hillsborough	39,812
Watford	Watford	Vicarage Road	17,477
Wolverhampton Wanderers	Wolverhampton	Molineux	31,700

=== Personnel and sponsoring ===
Team	Manager	Chairman	Team captain	Kit maker	Sponsor
Barnsley	David Flitcroft	Patrick Cryne	Bobby Hassell	Nike	C.K. Beckett
Birmingham City	Lee Clark	Peter Pannu	Stephen Carr	Diadora	EZE Group
Blackburn Rovers	Gary Bowyer (caretaker)	Paul Agnew	Scott Dann	Umbro	PROBIZ
Blackpool	Paul Ince	Karl Oyston	Alex Baptiste	Fila	Wonga
Bolton Wanderers	Dougie Freedman	Phil Gartside	Kevin Davies	adidas	188BET
Brighton & Hove Albion	Gus Poyet (suspended)	Tony Bloom	Gordon Greer	Erreà	BrightonandHoveJobs.com
Bristol City	Sean O'Driscoll	Keith Dawe	Liam Fontaine	adidas	Blackthorn
Burnley	Sean Dyche	Mike Garlick; John Banaszkiewicz	Jason Shackell	Puma	Premier Range
Cardiff City	Malky Mackay	Mehmet Dalman	Mark Hudson	Puma	Malaysia
Charlton Athletic	Chris Powell	Michael Slater	Johnnie Jackson	Nike	Andrews Air-conditioning
Crystal Palace	Ian Holloway	Steve Parish; Martin Long	Paddy McCarthy	Avec	GAC Logistics (front), Jelly Communications (back)
Derby County	Nigel Clough	Andrew Appleby	Richard Keogh	Kappa	buymobiles.net
Huddersfield Town	Mark Robins	Dean Hoyle	Peter Clarke	Umbro	Rekorderlig Cider (H); RadianB (A)
Hull City	Steve Bruce	Assem Allam	Jack Hobbs	adidas	Cash Converters
Ipswich Town	Mick McCarthy	Marcus Evans	Carlos Edwards	Mitre	Marcus Evans
Leeds United	Brian McDermott	Ken Bates	Lee Peltier	Macron	Enterprise Insurance
Leicester City	Nigel Pearson	Vichai Srivaddhanaprabha	Wes Morgan	Puma	King Power (Front), Amazing Thailand (Back)
Middlesbrough	Tony Mowbray	Steve Gibson	Rhys Williams	adidas	Ramsdens
Millwall	Steve Lomas	John Berylson	Paul Robinson	Macron	racing+
Nottingham Forest	Billy Davies	Fawaz Al-Hasawi	Danny Collins	Umbro	John Pye Auctions
Peterborough United	Darren Ferguson	Darragh MacAnthony	Gabriel Zakuani	Nike	Energy Park Peterborough
Sheffield Wednesday	Dave Jones	Milan Mandarić	Martin Taylor	Puma	Front: Gilder Group Honda (H), Westfield Health (A); Back: GCI Com
Watford	Gianfranco Zola	Gino Pozzo	John Eustace	Puma	Football Manager/Football Manager Handheld
Wolverhampton Wanderers	Kenny Jackett	Steve Morgan	Karl Henry	BURRDA	Sportingbet (front), What House? (back)

==== Managerial changes ====
Team	Outgoing manager	Manner of departure	Date of vacancy	Position in table	Incoming manager	Date of appointment
Hull City	(England) Nick Barmby	Sacked	8 May 2012	Pre-season	(England) Steve Bruce	8 June 2012
Birmingham City	(Republic of Ireland) Chris Hughton	Signed by Norwich City	7 June 2012	Pre-season	(England) Lee Clark	26 June 2012
Wolverhampton Wanderers	(England) Terry Connor	End of contract	30 June 2012	Pre-season	(Norway) Ståle Solbakken	1 July 2012^{1}
Watford	(England) Sean Dyche	Sacked	2 July 2012	Pre-season	(Italy) Gianfranco Zola	7 July 2012
Nottingham Forest	(England) Steve Cotterill	Sacked	12 July 2012	Pre-season	(Republic of Ireland) Sean O'Driscoll	19 July 2012
Blackburn Rovers	(Scotland) Steve Kean	Resigned	28 September 2012	3rd	(Norway) Henning Berg	31 October 2012
Bolton Wanderers	(Republic of Ireland) Owen Coyle	Sacked	9 October 2012	18th	(Scotland) Dougie Freedman	23 October 2012
Burnley	(England) Eddie Howe	Signed by Bournemouth	12 October 2012	16th	(England) Sean Dyche	30 October 2012
Crystal Palace	(Scotland) Dougie Freedman	Signed by Bolton Wanderers	23 October 2012	4th	(England) Ian Holloway	3 November 2012
Ipswich Town	(England) Paul Jewell	Mutual consent	24 October 2012	24th	(Republic of Ireland) Mick McCarthy	1 November 2012
Blackpool	(England) Ian Holloway	Signed by Crystal Palace	2 November 2012	12th	(England) Michael Appleton	7 November 2012
Nottingham Forest	(England) Sean O'Driscoll	Sacked	26 December 2012	8th	(Scotland) Alex McLeish	27 December 2012
Blackburn Rovers	(Norway) Henning Berg	Sacked	27 December 2012	17th	(England) Michael Appleton	11 January 2013
Barnsley	(England) Keith Hill	Sacked	29 December 2012	24th	(England) David Flitcroft	13 January 2013
Wolverhampton Wanderers	(Norway) Ståle Solbakken	Sacked	5 January 2013	18th	(Wales) Dean Saunders	7 January 2013
Blackpool	(England) Michael Appleton	Signed by Blackburn Rovers	11 January 2013	14th	(England) Paul Ince	18 February 2013
Bristol City	(Scotland) Derek McInnes	Sacked	12 January 2013	24th	(England) Sean O'Driscoll	14 January 2013
Huddersfield Town	(England) Simon Grayson	Sacked	24 January 2013	18th	(England) Mark Robins	14 February 2013
Nottingham Forest	(Scotland) Alex McLeish	Mutual consent	5 February 2013	11th	(Scotland) Billy Davies	7 February 2013
Blackburn Rovers	(England) Michael Appleton	Sacked	19 March 2013	18th	(England) Gary Bowyer	24 May 2013
Leeds United	(England) Neil Warnock	Resigned	1 April 2013	12th	(England) Brian McDermott	12 April 2013
Wolverhampton Wanderers	(Wales) Dean Saunders	Sacked	7 May 2013	23rd	(Wales) Kenny Jackett	1 June 2013

- 23 Managerial changes ~ 12 sacked + 5 changed club + 3 resigned + 2 mutual consent + 1 contract finished

== League table ==
A total of 24 teams contest the division: 18 sides remaining in the division from last season, three relegated from the Premier League, and three promoted from the League One.

Pos	Team	Pld	W	D	L	GF	GA	GD	Pts	Promotion or relegation
1	Cardiff City (C, P)	46	25	12	9	72	45	+27	87	Promotion to the Premier League
2	Hull City (P)	46	24	7	15	61	52	+9	79	Promotion to the Premier League
3	Watford	46	23	8	15	85	58	+27	77	Qualification for Championship play-offs
4	Brighton & Hove Albion	46	19	18	9	69	43	+26	75	Qualification for Championship play-offs
5	Crystal Palace (O, P)	46	19	15	12	73	62	+11	72	Qualification for Championship play-offs
6	Leicester City	46	19	11	16	71	48	+23	68	Qualification for Championship play-offs
7	Bolton Wanderers	46	18	14	14	69	61	+8	68	
8	Nottingham Forest	46	17	16	13	63	59	+4	67	
9	Charlton Athletic	46	17	14	15	65	59	+6	65	
10	Derby County	46	16	13	17	65	62	+3	61	
11	Burnley	46	16	13	17	62	60	+2	61	
12	Birmingham City	46	15	16	15	63	69	−6	61	
13	Leeds United	46	17	10	19	57	66	−9	61	
14	Ipswich Town	46	16	12	18	48	61	−13	60	
15	Blackpool	46	14	17	15	62	63	−1	59	
16	Middlesbrough	46	18	5	23	61	70	−9	59	
17	Blackburn Rovers	46	14	16	16	55	62	−7	58	
18	Sheffield Wednesday	46	16	10	20	53	61	−8	58	
19	Huddersfield Town	46	15	13	18	53	73	−20	58	
20	Millwall	46	15	11	20	51	62	−11	56	
21	Barnsley	46	14	13	19	56	70	−14	55	
22	Peterborough United (R)	46	15	9	22	66	75	−9	54	Relegation to Football League One
23	Wolverhampton Wanderers (R)	46	14	9	23	55	69	−14	51	Relegation to Football League One
24	Bristol City (R)	46	11	8	27	59	84	−25	41	Relegation to Football League One

Updated to match(es) played on 4 May 2013. Source: BBC Sport
Rules for classification: 1) points; 2) goal difference; 3) number of goals scored.
(C) Champions; (O) Play-off winners; (P) Promoted; (R) Relegated

== Play-offs ==
Semifinals
3	Watford	0	3	3
6	Leicester City	1	1	2
4	Brighton & Hove Albion	0	0	0
5	Crystal Palace	0	2	2

Final
3	Watford	0
5	Crystal Palace (a.e.t.)	1

== Results ==
Home \ Away	BAR	BIR	BLB	BLP	BOL	B&HA	BRI	BUR	CAR	CHA	CRY	DER	HUD	HUL	IPS	LEE	LEI	MID	MIL	NOT	PET	SHW	WAT	WOL
Barnsley		1–2	1–3	1–1	2–3	2–1	1–0	1–1	1–2	0–6	1–1	1–1	0–1	2–0	1–1	2–0	2–0	1–0	2–0	1–4	0–2	0–1	1–0	2–1
Birmingham City	0–5		1–1	1–1	2–1	2–2	2–0	2–2	0–1	1–1	2–2	3–1	0–1	2–3	0–1	1–0	1–1	3–2	1–1	2–1	1–0	0–0	0–4	2–3
Blackburn Rovers	2–1	1–1		1–1	1–2	1–1	2–0	1–1	1–4	1–2	1–1	2–0	1–0	1–0	1–0	0–0	2–1	1–2	0–2	3–0	2–3	1–0	1–0	0–1
Blackpool	1–2	1–1	2–0		2–2	1–1	0–0	1–0	1–2	0–2	1–0	2–1	1–3	0–0	6–0	2–1	0–0	4–1	2–1	2–2	0–1	0–0	2–2	1–2
Bolton Wanderers	1–1	3–1	1–0	2–2		1–0	3–2	2–1	2–1	2–0	0–1	2–0	1–0	4–1	1–2	2–2	0–0	2–1	1–1	2–2	1–0	0–1	2–1	2–0
Brighton & Hove Albion	5–1	0–1	1–1	6–1	1–1		2–0	1–0	0–0	0–0	3–0	2–1	4–1	1–0	1–1	2–2	1–1	0–1	2–2	0–0	1–0	3–0	1–3	2–0
Bristol City	5–3	0–1	3–5	1–1	1–2	0–0		3–4	4–2	0–2	4–1	0–2	1–3	1–2	2–1	2–3	0–4	2–0	1–1	2–0	4–2	1–1	2–0	1–4
Burnley	1–1	1–2	1–1	1–0	2–0	1–3	3–1		1–1	0–1	1–0	2–0	0–1	0–1	2–0	1–0	0–1	0–0	2–2	1–1	5–2	3–3	1–1	2–0
Cardiff City	1–1	2–1	3–0	3–0	1–1	0–2	2–1	4–0		0–0	2–1	1–1	1–0	2–1	0–0	2–1	1–1	1–0	1–0	3–0	1–2	1–0	2–1	3–1
Charlton Athletic	0–1	1–1	1–1	2–1	3–2	2–2	4–1	0–1	5–4		0–1	1–1	1–1	0–0	1–2	2–1	2–1	1–4	0–2	0–2	2–0	1–2	1–2	2–1
Crystal Palace	0–0	0–4	2–0	2–2	0–0	3–0	2–1	4–3	3–2	2–1		3–0	1–1	4–2	5–0	2–2	2–2	4–1	2–2	1–1	3–2	2–1	2–3	3–1
Derby County	2–0	3–2	1–1	4–1	1–1	0–0	3–0	1–2	1–1	3–2	0–1		3–0	1–2	0–1	3–1	2–1	3–1	1–0	1–1	3–1	2–2	5–1	0–0
Huddersfield Town	2–2	1–1	2–2	1–1	2–2	1–2	1–0	2–0	0–0	0–1	1–0	1–0		0–1	0–0	2–4	0–2	2–1	3–0	1–1	2–2	0–0	2–3	2–1
Hull City	1–0	5–2	2–0	2–3	3–1	1–0	0–0	0–1	2–2	1–0	0–0	2–1	2–0		2–1	2–0	0–0	1–0	4–1	1–2	1–3	1–3	0–1	2–1
Ipswich Town	1–1	3–1	1–1	1–0	1–0	0–3	1–1	2–1	1–2	1–2	3–0	1–2	2–2	1–2		3–0	1–0	4–0	3–0	3–1	1–1	0–3	0–2	0–2
Leeds United	1–0	0–1	3–3	2–0	1–0	1–2	1–0	1–0	0–1	1–1	2–1	1–2	1–2	2–3	2–0		1–0	2–1	1–0	2–1	1–1	2–1	1–6	1–0
Leicester City	2–2	2–2	3–0	1–0	3–2	1–0	2–0	2–1	0–1	1–2	1–2	4–1	6–1	3–1	6–0	1–1		1–0	0–1	2–2	2–0	0–1	1–2	2–1
Middlesbrough	2–3	0–1	1–0	4–2	2–1	0–2	1–3	3–2	2–1	2–2	2–1	2–2	3–0	2–0	2–0	1–0	1–2		1–2	1–0	0–0	3–1	1–2	2–0
Millwall	1–2	3–3	1–2	0–2	2–1	1–2	2–1	0–2	0–2	0–0	0–0	2–1	4–0	0–1	0–0	1–0	1–0	3–1		0–1	1–5	1–2	1–0	0–2
Nottingham Forest	0–0	2–2	0–0	1–1	1–1	2–2	1–0	2–0	3–1	2–1	2–2	0–1	6–1	1–2	1–0	4–2	2–3	0–0	1–4		2–1	1–0	0–3	3–1
Peterborough United	2–1	0–2	1–4	1–4	5–4	0–0	1–2	2–2	2–1	2–2	1–2	3–0	3–1	1–1	0–0	1–2	2–1	2–3	1–2	0–1		1–0	3–2	0–2
Sheffield Wednesday	2–1	3–2	3–2	0–2	1–2	3–1	2–3	0–2	0–2	2–0	1–0	2–2	1–3	0–1	1–1	1–1	0–2	2–0	3–2	0–1	2–1		1–4	0–0
Watford	4–1	2–0	4–0	1–2	2–1	0–1	2–2	3–3	0–0	3–4	2–2	2–1	4–0	1–2	0–1	1–2	2–1	1–2	0–0	2–0	1–0	2–1		2–1
Wolverhampton Wanderers	3–1	1–0	1–1	1–2	2–2	3–3	2–1	1–2	1–2	1–1	1–2	1–1	1–3	1–0	0–2	2–2	2–1	3–2	0–1	1–2	0–3	1–0	1–1	

Updated to match(es) played on 4 May 2013. Source: The Football League
Legend: Blue = home team win; Yellow = draw; Red = away team win.

== Season statistics ==
=== Top scorers ===
As of 13 May 2013.

Rank	Player	Club	Goals
1	(England) Glenn Murray	Crystal Palace	30
2	(Scotland) Jordan Rhodes	Blackburn Rovers^{1}	29
3	(England) Charlie Austin	Burnley	24
4	(Czech Republic) Matěj Vydra	Watford^{3}	22
4	(New Zealand) Chris Wood	Leicester City^{2}	22
6	(England) Troy Deeney	Watford^{4}	20
7	(England) Tom Ince	Blackpool	18
8	(England) David Nugent	Leicester City^{3}	16
9	(Argentina) Luciano Becchio	Leeds United	15
10	(England) Sylvan Ebanks-Blake	Wolverhampton Wanderers	14

1. – includes two goals for Huddersfield Town
2. – includes eleven goals for Millwall
3. – includes two goals in the play-offs
4. – includes one goal in the play-offs

=== Assists ===
As of 4 May 2013.

Rank	Player	Club	Assists
1	(England) Tom Ince	Blackpool	14
2	(Republic of Ireland) Robbie Brady	Hull City	13
3	(England) Chris Eagles	Bolton Wanderers	12
4	(Republic of Ireland) Andy Reid	Nottingham Forest	11
4	(Scotland) Ross McCormack	Leeds United	11
4	(Mali) Bakary Sako	Wolverhampton Wanderers	11
4	(Spain) Andrea Orlandi	Brighton	11
4	(Zimbabwe) Bradley Pritchard	Charlton Athletic	11
4	(England) Kieran Trippier	Burnley	11
10	(Republic of Ireland) Simon Cox	Nottingham Forest	10
10	(England) Troy Deeney	Watford^{1}	10

1. – includes one assist in the play-offs

=== Penalties ===
As of 4 May 2013.

Rank	Player	Club	Scored (Miss)
1	(England) Glenn Murray	Crystal Palace	8 (3)
2	(Scotland) Jordan Rhodes	Blackburn Rovers^{1}	6
3	(Argentina) Luciano Becchio	Leeds United	5
3	(Northern Ireland) Grant McCann	Peterborough United	5
5	(Jamaica) Marlon King	Birmingham City	4
5	(England) Sam Baldock	Bristol City	4
5	(Republic of Ireland) Keith Andrews	Bolton Wanderers	4
5	(Northern Ireland) Jamie Ward	Derby County	4
5	(England) Peter Whittingham	Cardiff City	4
5	(England) Charlie Austin	Burnley	4
5	(Spain) David López	Brighton	4

1. – includes one penalty for Huddersfield Town

=== Hat-tricks ===
Player	For	Against	Result	Date
(England) Peter Whittingham	Cardiff City	Wolverhampton Wanderers	3–1	2 September 2012
(England) Charlie Austin (#1)	Burnley	Peterborough United	5–2	15 September 2012
(Wales) Craig Davies^{4}	Barnsley	Birmingham City	0–5	22 September 2012
(England) Glenn Murray (#1)	Crystal Palace	Cardiff City	3–2	22 September 2012
(England) David Nugent	Leicester City	Hull City	3–1	23 September 2012
(England) Emile Sinclair	Peterborough	Hull City	1–3	29 September 2012
(England) Charlie Austin (#2)	Burnley	Sheffield Wednesday	3–3	2 October 2012
(Jamaica) Marlon King	Birmingham City	Millwall	3–3	23 October 2012
(England) Glenn Murray (#2)	Crystal Palace	Ipswich Town	5–0	6 November 2012
(Scotland) Jordan Rhodes	Blackburn Rovers	Peterborough United	1–4	17 November 2012
(New Zealand) Chris Wood	Leicester City	Bristol City	0–4	12 January 2013
(Poland) Radosław Majewski	Nottingham Forest	Huddersfield Town	6–1	19 February 2013
(England) Dwight Gayle	Peterborough	Blackburn Rovers	2–3	2 March 2013
(Argentina) Leonardo Ulloa	Brighton	Huddersfield Town	4–1	2 March 2013
(England) Kevin Phillips	Crystal Palace	Hull City	4–2	5 March 2013
(England) James Vaughan	Huddersfield Town	Bristol City	1–3	27 April 2013

- ^{4} Player scored 4 goals

=== Scoring ===
- First goal of the season: Mark Hudson for Cardiff City against Huddersfield Town (17 August 2012)
- Fastest goal of the season: 30 seconds, Glenn Murray for Crystal Palace against Sheffield Wednesday (1 September 2012)
- Latest goal of the season: 98 minutes and 23 seconds, Troy Deeney for Watford against Leeds United (10 November 2012)
- Largest winning margin: 6 goals
  - Blackpool 6–0 Ipswich Town (25 August 2012)
  - Leicester City 6–0 Ipswich Town (17 November 2012)
  - Barnsley 0–6 Charlton Athletic (13 April 2013)
- Highest scoring game: 9 goals
  - Charlton Athletic 5–4 Cardiff City (6 November 2012)
  - Peterborough United 5–4 Bolton Wanderers (22 December 2012)
- Most goals scored in a match by a single team: 6 goals
  - Blackpool 6–0 Ipswich Town (25 August 2012)
  - Leeds United 1–6 Watford (10 November 2012)
  - Leicester City 6–0 Ipswich Town (17 November 2012)
  - Leicester City 6–1 Huddersfield Town (1 January 2013)
  - Nottingham Forest 6–1 Huddersfield Town (19 February 2013)
  - Barnsley 0–6 Charlton Athletic (13 April 2013)
  - Brighton & Hove Albion 6–1 Blackpool (20 April 2013)
- Most goals scored in a match by a losing team: 4 goals
  - Charlton Athletic 5–4 Cardiff City (6 November 2012)
  - Peterborough United 5–4 Bolton Wanderers (22 December 2012)

=== Clean sheets ===
- Most clean sheets: 18
  - Cardiff City
- Fewest clean sheets: 5
  - Bristol City

=== Discipline ===
- Most yellow cards (club): 93
  - Sheffield Wednesday
- Most yellow cards (player): 13
  - Shane Lowry (Millwall)
- Most red cards (club): 5
  - Nottingham Forest
  - Watford
  - Wolverhampton Wanderers
- Most red cards (player): 2
  - Adlène Guedioura (Nottingham Forest)
  - Nikola Žigić (Birmingham City)

== Monthly awards ==
Month	Manager of the Month		Player of the Month		Reference
Month	Manager	Club	Player	Club	Reference
August	(England) Ian Holloway	Blackpool	(England) Tom Ince	Blackpool	
September	(Scotland) Dougie Freedman	Crystal Palace	(England) Glenn Murray	Crystal Palace	
October	(England) Tony Mowbray	Middlesbrough	(England) Charlie Austin	Burnley	
November	(England) Kenny Jackett	Millwall	(Nigeria) Sone Aluko	Hull City	
December	(England) Steve Bruce	Hull City	(England) Dwight Gayle	Peterborough United	
January	(England) Nigel Pearson	Leicester City	(Czech Republic) Matěj Vydra	Watford	
February	(Italy) Gianfranco Zola	Watford	(England) Fraizer Campbell	Cardiff City	
March	(Scotland) Billy Davies	Nottingham Forest	(Scotland) George Boyd	Hull City	
April	(Scotland) Dougie Freedman	Bolton Wanderers	(England) James Vaughan	Huddersfield Town	

== Final day of the season ==
The final day of the season fell on 4 May 2013. Watford and Hull City were both fighting for 2nd place and automatic promotion to the 2013–14 Premier League. Crystal Palace, Leicester City, Bolton Wanderers and Nottingham Forest were all fighting for 5th and 6th place, and for a play-off spot. However, on the final day, it was mathematically possible for any 2 of 7 teams to get relegated alongside already relegated Bristol City. These teams were Wolverhampton Wanderers, Peterborough United, Huddersfield Town, Blackburn Rovers, Millwall, Barnsley and Sheffield Wednesday.

Late drama occupied all three battles, with the headlines inevitably going to Hull, who won promotion to the Premier League after a 2–2 draw with newly crowned champions Cardiff City and Watford being beaten 2–1 by Leeds United. Hull were 2–1 up and in the 91st minute when they were awarded a penalty which could have sealed their 2nd place spot. Hull missed their penalty and in the 93rd minute, Cardiff were awarded a penalty, which was converted by Nicky Maynard, bringing the score to 2–2. After a serious injury delayed the match, the Watford game was fifteen minutes behind the other games, so with the score at 1–1, Watford knew that a win would secure their promotion to the Premier League. In the 89th minute Leeds scored to make it 2–1. The scores stayed that way and promotion for Hull was assured.

In the play-off battle between Leicester City, Crystal Palace, Nottingham Forest and Bolton, there was a late goal for Leicester (vs Nottingham Forest) that secured a 3–2 victory, meaning that the 2–2 draw between Bolton Wanderers and Blackpool left them in 6th place. As the other results turned out, Crystal Palace would have remained in 5th place with a loss, but also scored late on to beat Peterborough 3–2. This left Bolton in 7th place, missing out on play-offs via goal difference.

The relegation battle ended in disappointment for Wolves and Peterborough. The late goal for Crystal Palace against Peterborough meant that a 1–1 draw was enough for Blackburn, a 2–0 win for Sheffield Wednesday over Middlesbrough was enough to secure their safety, a 1–0 defeat for Millwall against Derby County was enough for them and a 2–2 draw between Huddersfield and Barnsley was enough for both teams. Wolves lost 2–0 to Brighton, having started the day in the most difficult situation of the threatened teams.

== Attendances ==
No.	Club	Average	Change	Highest	Lowest
1	Brighton & Hove Albion	26,236	31.0%	30,003	23,703
2	Sheffield Wednesday	24,078	12.9%	31,375	18,922
3	Derby County	23,228	-10.7%	33,010	20,063
4	Nottingham Forest	23,082	5.1%	28,707	18,748
5	Cardiff City	22,999	4.1%	26,588	20,058
6	Leicester City	22,054	-4.3%	25,913	8,585
7	Wolverhampton Wanderers	21,773	-15.2%	28,595	18,174
8	Leeds United	21,572	-7.4%	25,532	16,788
9	Charlton Athletic	18,499	6.3%	26,185	15,585
10	Bolton Wanderers	18,034	-23.8%	24,844	15,675
11	Ipswich Town	17,526	-4.1%	21,988	15,417
12	Hull City	17,369	-7.6%	23,812	14,756
13	Crystal Palace	17,280	13.5%	22,154	12,757
14	Middlesbrough	16,794	-4.3%	28,229	13,377
15	Birmingham City	16,703	-12.7%	19,630	13,532
16	Blackburn Rovers	14,997	-33.5%	20,735	12,230
17	Huddersfield Town	14,978	5.9%	21,614	11,840
18	Blackpool	13,917	9.0%	15,907	12,653
19	Watford	13,454	5.9%	16,968	11,022
20	Bristol City	13,348	-3.6%	19,148	11,836
21	Burnley	12,928	-8.0%	21,341	10,450
22	Millwall	10,559	-8.1%	18,013	8,607
23	Barnsley	10,207	-1.2%	15,744	7,844
24	Peterborough United	8,215	-9.8%	13,938	5,435
