= Gerry Garvan =

Irish footballer and coach

Personal information
- Full name: Gerard Garvan
- Place of birth: Dublin, Ireland
- Position: Midfielder

Senior career*
Years	Team	Apps	(Gls)
- Drumcondra
- Shelbourne
- Athlone Town
- * Club domestic league appearances and goals

Gerard Garvan is an Irish former footballer and coach who played as a midfielder for several clubs, during the 1960s and 1970s, in the League of Ireland, including Drumcondra, Shelbourne and Athlone Town.

== Club career ==
On 19 November 1967, while playing for Shelbourne against Bohemians at Dalymount Park, Garvan helped Jimmy O'Connor score the fastest hat-trick in top division domestic football history. Garvan provided the cross which allowed O'Connor to head home his third goal in the space of 2 minutes and 13 seconds. He also had a hand in both other goals that created world history to this day.

== Family ==
When Garvan married his wife Mary Martin, he married into a notable Irish footballing family. His father-in-law, Con Martin, was an international during the 1940s and 1950s and captained both Ireland teams – the FAI XI and the IFA XI. Garvan subsequently worked as an insurance broker and formed a company, Martin & Garvan Insurances Ltd. His brother-in-law Mick Martin played for both the Republic of Ireland and Manchester United while his son, Owen Garvan, played for Ipswich Town and Crystal Palace.

== Coaching career ==
As a coach Garvan found success with the junior teams of Home Farm in the Dublin and District Schoolboy League. Under Garvan, the U-14 team, which featured his own son, Owen, went unbeaten for three years between 1999 and 2002. Along the way they won the Schoolboys FAI Cup twice. In 2002, Garvan took his Home Farm U-14 team to play a Celtic youth team in Glasgow and Darren O'Dea scored twice as Home Farm won 2–0. O'Dea, Diarmuid O'Carroll, Gary Walsh and Gareth Christie were already being tracked by Celtic youth development officer, Tommy Burns, and all four were subsequently offered contracts. Three further members of Garvan's team – goalkeeper Shane Supple, defender Michael Synnott and midfielder Owen Garvan – were recruited by Ipswich Town. Another member of the team Chris McCann signed for Burnley.
