= 2013–14 Crystal Palace F.C. season =

English football club season

Crystal Palace
2013–14 season
- Co-chairmen: Stephen Browett; Steve Parish
- Manager: Ian Holloway (until 23 October); Keith Millen (caretaker, until 23 November); Tony Pulis (from 23 November)
- Stadium: Selhurst Park
- Premier League: 11th
- FA Cup: Fourth round (eliminated by Wigan Athletic)
- League Cup: Second round (eliminated by Bristol City)
- Top goalscorer: League: Jason Puncheon, Dwight Gayle (7); All: Dwight Gayle (8)
- Highest home attendance: 25,564 (12 April 2014 vs Aston Villa, Premier League)
- Lowest home attendance: 22,466 (22 September 2013 vs Swansea City, Premier League)
Home colours	Away colours	Third colours

The 2013–14 season was Crystal Palace's first season back in the Premier League after eight years. After a poor start to the season which saw Ian Holloway resign and Tony Pulis take over as manager, Palace recovered and finished in 11th position. The club also competed in the League Cup and the FA Cup.

== Background ==
In May 2013 the club unveiled a new badge for the coming season. The club had previously announced designs to update the badge, but after none of the original designs met with fan approval the club utilised a design suggested by a fan and reworked it, launching it at the end of year awards on 7 May 2013. Palace also launched their new kit at the awards ceremony. The home kit is reminiscent of Barcelona, with red and blue halves on the shirt and yellow trim. Co-Chairman Steve Parish said the club would be looking to redevelop the ground at Selhurst Park. He said the club would be "working on re-developing the ground a stand at a time." In July Parish announced the main stand would be getting new seats. To celebrate promotion the club's cheerleaders, The Crystals, released a video of themselves and US cheerleaders the Jacksonville Jaguars ROAR performing "Glad All Over". The club also held their annual beer festival during the close season, and Kevin Day and Jo Brand hosted the second annual comedy night for Comic Relief and the Palace Academy.

The club bought their training ground in Beckenham for £2.3 million at auction after the current owners put the land up for sale. The decision to purchase it was taken after a discussion between Co-chairman Steve Parish and the coaching staff at Palace. It was felt that the training ground's proximity to the club's natural catchment area was an asset too vital to lose. The club also announced that they would be looking for a sponsor for Selhurst Park. Co-chairman Steve Parish told the Croydon Advertiser the club were looking to do a deal that was "not really (about) naming rights but a sponsor so that every advert in the stadium can be one thing."

== Pre-season ==
Crystal Palace held talks with both Bordeaux and Inter Milan regarding a pre-season friendly to be held at Selhurst Park on 10 or 11 August. Bordeaux were unavailable, having a competitive match against Paris St Germain in the French league. Inter Milan were initially agreeable to the game, but after Real Madrid approached them with an offer of a friendly on the same date they decided to pursue that option rather than the Palace game. Palace then approached Italian Cup winners Lazio, and a date of 10 August was agreed for the final pre-season friendly. The club began their pre-season training in Portugal on 8 July 2013, Holloway described the trip as "very pleasing. Very nice surroundings, the lads have worked really hard".

The fixtures list saw Palace drawn against Premiership giants Tottenham at home for the first game of the season. Five matches involving Palace were initially chosen for broadcast, Sky opting to show the Palace vs Tottenham match on Sunday 18 August 2013, the home game against Sunderland on 31 August 2013 and the 21 October home game against Fulham. BT Sport selected the away game against Manchester United on 14 September 2013 and the home game against Arsenal on 26 October.

=== Transfers ===
Crystal Palace announced the release of six players from their academy on 4 June 2013. Bayan Fenwick, Jack Holland, Kadell Daniel, Aaron Akuruka, William Johnson-Cole and Kieran Woodley all left the club having not been offered professional contracts following promotion to the Premier League. André Moritz also left the club by mutual agreement after a new deal could not be agreed. Owen Garvan, Peter Ramage and Danny Gabbidon all signed new contracts while Stephen Dobbie's loan move from Brighton & Hove Albion was made permanent. On 3 July 2013, Palace smashed their transfer record after signing Dwight Gayle from Peterborough United for a reported £4.5 million. Jerome Thomas signed a two-year contract with the club in early July. Alex Marrow left the club to return to Blackburn Rovers for an undisclosed fee. Marrow represented the club four times in the previous season.

=== Kit ===
Supplier: Avec
Sponsor(s): GAC Logistics

Home	Away	Away alt.	Third

Last updated: 4 July 2013.
Source: Crystal Palace Direct

== Players ==
=== Squad information ===
N	Pos.	Nat.	Name	Age	EU	Since	App	Goals	Ends	Transfer fee	Notes
1	GK	(Argentina)	Julián Speroni	34	EU	2004	348	0	2014	£0.5M	
2	DF	(England)	Joel Ward	24	EU	2012	67	0	2016	£0.4M	
3	DF	(Jamaica)	Adrian Mariappa (Note: Mariappa was born in Harrow, England, but also qualifies to represent Fiji internationally through his father and Jamaica through his maternal grandparents and made his international debut for Jamaica in June 2012.)	27	EU	2013	26	1	undisclosed	undisclosed (~ £2,000,000)	
4	DF	(Norway)	Jonathan Parr	25	EU	2011	101	2	2014	undisclosed	
5	DF	(Republic of Ireland)	Paddy McCarthy (captain)	30	EU	2008	149	6	2015	undisclosed	
6	DF	(England)	Scott Dann	27	EU	2014 (Winter)	14	1	2017	undisclosed	
7	MF	(Democratic Republic of the Congo)	Yannick Bolasie (Note: Bolasie was born in Lyon, France, but also qualifies to represent England and DR Congo internationally and made his international debut for DR Congo in March 2013.)	24	EU	2012	77	3	2015	undisclosed	
8	MF	(South Africa)	Kagisho Dikgacoi	29	Non-EU	2011	115	8	undisclosed	£0.6M	
10	MF	(Republic of Ireland)	Owen Garvan	26	EU	2010	86	11	2015	£0.25M	Went on loan to Millwall
11	MF	(England)	Tom Ince	22	EU	2014 (Winter)	8	1	2014	Free	On loan from Blackpool
12	MF	(England)	Stuart O'Keefe	23	EU	2010	48	1	undisclosed	undisclosed	
13	MF	(England)	Jason Puncheon	27	EU	2013	36	7	2018	undisclosed	Originally on loan from Southampton
14	MF	(England)	Jerome Thomas	31	EU	2013	9	0	2015	Free	
15	MF	(Australia)	Mile Jedinak	29	Non-EU	2011	116	5	2014	Free	
16	FW	(England)	Dwight Gayle	24	EU	2013	25	7	undisclosed (~2017)	undisclosed (~ £4,500,000)	
17	FW	(England)	Glenn Murray	30	EU	2011	102	39	2016	Free	
18	FW	(England)	Aaron Wilbraham	34	EU	2012	33	2	2014	Free	
19	DF	(Wales)	Danny Gabbidon	34	EU	2012	34	2	2014	Free	
20	MF	(Wales)	Jonny Williams (Note: Williams was born in Pembury, England, but also qualifies to represent Wales internationally through his father and represented them at U-17, U-19, and U-21 level before making his international debut for Wales in March 2013.)	20	EU	2011	62	1	2017	Youth system	Went on loan to Ipswich Town
21	DF	(England)	Dean Moxey	28	EU	2011 (Winter)	103	1	2015	undisclosed	
22	DF	(England)	Jack Hunt	23	EU	2013	0	0	undisclosed	undisclosed (~ £2,000,000)	Went on loan to Barnsley
25	GK	(Scotland)	Neil Alexander	36	EU	2013	1	0	2014	Free Transfer	
26	GK	(Wales)	Wayne Hennessey	27	EU	2014 (Winter)	1	0	2017	£3m	
27	DF	(Republic of Ireland)	Damien Delaney	32	EU	2012	83	4	2014	Free	
28	MF	(Wales)	Joe Ledley	27	EU	2014 (Winter)	14	2	2017	£2.5m	
29	FW	(Morocco)	Marouane Chamakh (Note: Chamakh was born in Tonneins, France, and represented them at U-19 level, but also qualified to represent Morocco internationally through his parents and made his international debut for Morocco in June 2003.)	30	EU	2013	34	6	2014	undisclosed	
30	FW	(England)	Cameron Jerome	27	EU	2013	29	2	2014	Free	On loan from Stoke City
31	MF	(Algeria)	Adlène Guedioura (Note: Guedioura was born in La Roche-sur-Yon, France, but also qualifies to represent Algeria internationally through his parents and made his international debut for Algeria in May 2010.)	28	EU	2013	9	0	2016	undisclosed (~ £2,500,000)	
32	FW	(England)	Kwesi Appiah (Note: Appiah was born in Thamesmead, England, but also qualifies to represent Ghana internationally and would make his international debut for Ghana in January 2015.)	23	EU	2012 (Winter)	12	0	2015	undisclosed	Went on loan to AFC Wimbledon
33	FW	(England)	Ibra Sekajja (Note: Sekajja was born in Mulago, Uganda, but was raised in England and has represented them at U-16 level.)	21	EU	2011	2	1	undisclosed	Youth system	
34	GK	(Wales)	Lewis Price (Note: Price was born in Bournemouth, England, but also qualified to represent Wales internationally and made his international debut for Wales in November 2005.)	29	EU	2010	14	0	undisclosed	Free	Went on loan to Mansfield Town
35	MF	(England)	Kyle De Silva	20	EU	2011	10	0	2015	Youth system	
36	DF	(England)	Alex Wynter	20	EU	2010	2	0	undisclosed	Youth system	Went on loan to Colchester United
38	MF	(England)	Hiram Boateng	18	EU	2013	2	0	undisclosed	Youth system	Went on loan to Crawley Town
39	FW	(England)	Reise Allassani	18	EU	2013	0	0	undisclosed	Youth system	
40	GK	(England)	Ross Fitzsimons	19	EU	2011	0	0	undisclosed	Youth system	Went on loan to Farnborough
45	DF	(England)	Ryan Inniss	18	EU	2010	0	0	undisclosed	Youth system	Went on loan to Gillingham
46	MF	(Scotland)	Barry Bannan	24	EU	2013	17	1	2016	undisclosed (~ £500,000)	
48	MF	(England)	Sullay Kaikai	18	EU	2013	0	0	undisclosed	Youth system	Went on loan to Crawley Town
49	DF	(England)	Jerome Williams	19	EU	2013	1	0	undisclosed	Youth system	
	DF	(England)	Peter Ramage	30	EU	2012	66	4	2015	Free	Went on loan to Barnsley
	FW	(Scotland)	Stephen Dobbie	31	EU	2013	17	3	2015	undisclosed (~ £500,000)	Went on loan to Blackpool
	MF	(Spain)	José Campaña	20	EU	2013	6	0	2017	£1.7M	Went on loan to Nürnberg
	MF	(Mali)	Jimmy Kébé (Note: Kébé was born in Vitry-sur-Seine, France, but also qualified to represent Mali internationally and made his international debut for Mali in 2005.)	30	EU	2013	6	0	2016	undisclosed (~ £1,000,000)	Went on loan to Leeds United
Players that left the club during the season.
9	FW	(England)	Kevin Phillips	40	EU	2013	19	6	2014	Free	
23	DF	(France)	Florian Marange	28	EU	2013	1	0	2014	Free	
24	MF	(France)	Elliot Grandin	26	EU	2013	1	0	2014	Free Transfer	
26	DF	(England)	Matthew Parsons	22	EU	2010	10	0	2014	Youth system	
37	MF	(England)	Jason Banton	21	EU	2012	1	0	2014	Free	
	DF	(Wales)	Darcy Blake	25	EU	2012	11	0	2015	undisclosed	

- Last updated: 11 May 2014
- Source: Crystal Palace F.C.
- Ordered by squad number.

== Transfers and loans ==
=== Transfer in ===
Pos:	Player	Transferred from	Fee	Date	Source
MF	(Scotland) Stephen Dobbie	(England) Brighton & Hove Albion	Undisclosed (~ £500,000)	1 July 2013	
FW	(England) Dwight Gayle	(England) Peterborough United	£4,500,000	3 July 2013	
MF	(England) Jerome Thomas	Free agent	Free transfer	9 July 2013	
MF	(Spain) José Campaña	(Spain) Sevilla	Undisclosed (~ £1,700,000)	18 July 2013	
FW	(England) Kevin Phillips	(England) Blackpool	Free transfer	18 July 2013	
MF	(France) Elliot Grandin	(England) Blackpool	Free transfer	1 August 2013	
FW	(Morocco) Marouane Chamakh	(England) Arsenal	Undisclosed	10 August 2013	
GK	(Scotland) Neil Alexander	(Scotland) Rangers	Free transfer	15 August 2013	
DF	(France) Florian Marange	(France) Bordeaux	Free transfer	16 August 2013	
MF	(Mali) Jimmy Kébé	(England) Reading	Undisclosed (~ £1,000,000)	1 September 2013	
DF	(England) Jack Hunt	(England) Huddersfield Town	Undisclosed (~ £2,000,000)	1 September 2013	
DF	(Jamaica) Adrian Mariappa	(England) Reading	Undisclosed (~ £2,000,000)	2 September 2013	
MF	(Scotland) Barry Bannan	(England) Aston Villa	£500,000	2 September 2013	
MF	(Algeria) Adlène Guedioura	(England) Nottingham Forest	£2,500,000	2 September 2013	
DF	(England) Scott Dann	(England) Blackburn Rovers	Undisclosed (~ £1,500,000)	31 January 2014	
GK	(Wales) Wayne Hennessey	(England) Wolverhampton Wanderers	£3,000,000	31 January 2014	
MF	(Wales) Joe Ledley	(Scotland) Celtic	£700,000	31 January 2014	
MF	(England) Jason Puncheon	(England) Southampton	Undisclosed	31 January 2014	

Total spending: ▼£13,000,000 (~ £25,200,000)

=== Loan in ===
Pos:	Player	Loaned from	Date	Loan expires	Source
MF	(England) Jason Puncheon	(England) Southampton	21 August 2013	31 January 2014	
FW	(England) Cameron Jerome	(England) Stoke City	31 August 2013	30 July 2014	
MF	(England) Tom Ince	(England) Blackpool	31 January 2014	30 June 2014	

=== Transfer out ===
Pos:	Player	Transferred to	Fee	Date	Source
DF	(England) Aaron Akuruka	Free agent	Free transfer (Released)	4 June 2013	
MF	(England) Bayan Fenwick	Free Agent	Free transfer (Released)	4 June 2013	
DF	(England) Jack Holland	Free Agent	Free transfer (Released)	4 June 2013	
DF	(England) Kadell Daniel	Free Agent	Free transfer (Released)	4 June 2013	
FW	(England) Kieran Woodley	Free Agent	Free transfer (Released)	4 June 2013	
FW	(England) William Johnson-Cole	Free Agent	Free transfer (Released)	4 June 2013	
FW	(Wales) Jermaine Easter	(England) Millwall	Undisclosed	1 July 2013	
MF	(Brazil) André Moritz	(England) Bolton Wanderers	Free transfer	3 July 2013	
MF	(England) Alex Marrow	(England) Blackburn Rovers	Undisclosed	9 July 2013	
FW	(England) Kevin Phillips	(England) Leicester City	Free transfer (Released)	1 January 2014	
DF	(France) Florian Marange	Free Agent (later join (France) Sochaux)	Free transfer (Released)	1 January 2014	
MF	(England) Jason Banton	(England) Plymouth Argyle	Undisclosed	8 January 2014	
DF	(England) Matthew Parsons	(England) Plymouth Argyle	Undisclosed	17 January 2014	
MF	(France) Elliot Grandin	Free Agent (later join (England) Blackpool)	Free transfer (Released)	29 January 2014	
DF	(Wales) Darcy Blake	Free Agent (later join (Wales) Newport County)	Free transfer (Released)	31 January 2014	

Total income: Undisclosed

=== Loan out ===
Pos:	Player	Loaned to	Date	Loan expires	Source
MF	(England) Jason Banton	(England) M.K. Dons	17 July 2013	5 January 2014	
DF	(England) Ryan Inniss	(England) Cheltenham Town	1 August 2013	1 October 2013 (terminated on 13 September 2013)	
DF	(England) Peter Ramage	(England) Barnsley	31 August 2013	30 July 2014	
FW	(Scotland) Stephen Dobbie	(England) Blackpool	17 September 2013	17 December 2013 (later extended)	
FW	(England) Kwesi Appiah	(England) Cambridge United	13 September 2013	13 November 2013	
DF	(England) Jerome Williams	(England) Forest Green Rovers	2 January 2014	2 February 2014	
MF	(Mali) Jimmy Kébé	(England) Leeds United	10 January 2014	30 June 2014	
DF	(England) Ryan Inniss	(England) Luton Town	10 January 2014	10 February 2014	
FW	(England) Kwesi Appiah	(England) Notts County	21 January 2014	21 February 2014	
DF	(England) Jack Hunt	(England) Barnsley	29 January 2014	30 June 2014	
MF	(Spain) José Campaña	(Germany) 1. FC Nürnberg	31 January 2014	30 June 2014	
MF	(England) Hiram Boateng	(England) Crawley Town	8 February 2014	5 April 2014	
MF	(England) Sullay Kaikai	(England) Crawley Town	8 February 2014	5 April 2014	
DF	(England) Ryan Inniss	(England) Gillingham	14 February 2014	31 May 2014	
MF	(Wales) Jonathan Williams	(England) Ipswich Town	27 February 2014	27 March 2014 (later extended)	
MF	(Republic of Ireland) Owen Garvan	(England) Millwall	28 February 2014	31 May 2014	
FW	(England) Kwesi Appiah	(England) AFC Wimbledon	27 March 2014	31 May 2014	
DF	(England) Alex Wynter	(England) Colchester United	27 March 2014	31 May 2014	
GK	(Wales) Lewis Price	(England) Mansfield Town	11 April 2014	31 May 2014	

== Statistics ==
=== Player statistics ===
Numbers in parentheses denote appearances as substitute.
Players with no appearances not included in the list.
As of 11 May 2014

No.	Pos.	Nat.	Name	Premier League		FA Cup		League Cup		Total		Discipline	
No.	Pos.	Nat.	Name	Apps	Goals	Apps	Goals	Apps	Goals	Apps	Goals	Yellow card	Red card
1	GK	ARG	Julián Speroni	37	0	2	0	0	0	39	0	0	0
2	DF	ENG	Joel Ward	36	0	0	0	0	0	36	0	3	0
3	DF	JAM	Adrian Mariappa	23 (1)	1	2	0	0	0	25 (1)	1	7+	0
4	DF	NOR	Jonathan Parr	7 (8)	0	2	0	0	0	9 (8)	0	1+	0
5	DF	IRL	Paddy McCarthy	0 (1)	0	1	0	0	0	1 (1)	0	0	0
6	DF	ENG	Scott Dann	14	1	0	0	0	0	14	1	4	0
7	MF	DRC	Yannick Bolasie	23 (6)	0	1	0	0	0	24 (6)	0	1	1
8	MF	RSA	Kagisho Dikgacoi	25 (1)	0	1	0	0	0	26 (1)	0	3	1
11	MF	ENG	Tom Ince	5 (3)	1	0	0	0	0	5 (3)	1	0	0
12	MF	ENG	Stuart O'Keefe	2 (10)	1	1 (1)	0	1	0	4 (11)	1	3*	0
13	MF	ENG	Jason Puncheon	29 (5)	7	1 (1)	0	0	0	30 (6)	7	2	0
14	MF	ENG	Jerome Thomas	3 (6)	0	0	0	0	0	3 (6)	0	2	0
15	MF	AUS	Mile Jedinak	38	1	0	0	0	0	38	1	7	0
16	FW	ENG	Dwight Gayle	8 (15)	7	1 (1)	1	0	0	9 (16)	8	0	0
17	FW	ENG	Glenn Murray	3 (11)	1	0	0	0	0	3 (11)	1	1	0
18	FW	ENG	Aaron Wilbraham	1 (3)	0	0 (1)	1	1	0	2 (4)	1	1+	0
19	DF	WAL	Danny Gabbidon	22 (1)	1	1	0	0	0	23 (1)	1	0	0
21	DF	ENG	Dean Moxey	17 (2)	0	0 (1)	0	0	0	17 (3)	0	2	0
25	GK	SCO	Neil Alexander	0	0	0	0	1	0	1	0	0	0
26	GK	WAL	Wayne Hennessey	1	0	0	0	0	0	1	0	0	0
27	DF	IRE	Damien Delaney	37	1	2	0	0	0	39	1	9	0
28	MF	WAL	Joe Ledley	14	2	0	0	0	0	14	2	1	0
29	FW	MAR	Marouane Chamakh	27 (5)	5	1 (1)	1	0	0	28 (6)	6	9	0
30	FW	ENG	Cameron Jerome	21 (7)	2	1	0	0	0	22 (7)	2	5+	0
31	MF	ALG	Adlène Guedioura	4 (4)	0	1	0	0	0	5 (4)	0	0	0
35	MF	ENG	Kyle De Silva	0	0	0	0	0 (1)	0	0 (1)	0	0	0
46	MF	SCO	Barry Bannan	13 (2)	1	2	0	0	0	15 (2)	1	1	0
49	DF	ENG	Jerome Williams	0	0	0	0	1	0	1	0	0	0
Players that left the club during the season.
6	MF	ESP	José Campaña[L]	4 (2)	0	0	0	0	0	4 (2)	0	0	0
9	FW	ENG	Kevin Phillips[O]	0 (4)	0	0	0	0 (1)	0	0 (5)	0	0	0
10	MF	IRL	Owen Garvan[L]	1 (1)	0	0	0	1	1	2 (1)	1	0	0
11	FW	SCO	Stephen Dobbie[L]	1	0	0	0	1	0	2	0	0	0
20	MF	WAL	Jonathan Williams[L]	0 (9)	0	1	0	1	0	2 (9)	0	0	0
23	DF	FRA	Florian Marange[O]	0	0	0	0	1	0	1	0	0	0
24	MF	FRA	Elliot Grandin[O]	0	0	0	0	1	0	1	0	0	0
28	MF	MLI	Jimmy Kébé[L]	2 (4)	0	0	0	0	0	2 (4)	0	0	0
32	MF	ENG	Kwesi Appiah[L]	0	0	0	0	0 (1)	0	0 (1)	0	0	0
36	DF	ENG	Alex Wynter[L]	0	0	0	0	1	0	1	0	0	0
38	MF	ENG	Hiram Boateng[L]	0	0	1	0	0	0	1	0	1+	0

[L] – Out on loan
[O] – Left club permanent
* – One booked in League Cup
+ – One booked in FA Cup

=== Goalscorers ===
As of 11 May 2014

No.	Pos.	Name	Premier League	FA Cup	League Cup	Total
3	DF	(Jamaica) Adrian Mariappa	1	0	0	1
6	DF	(England) Scott Dann	1	0	0	1
10	MF	(Republic of Ireland) Owen Garvan	0	0	1	1
11	MF	(England) Tom Ince	1	0	0	1
12	MF	(England) Stuart O'Keefe	1	0	0	1
13	MF	(England) Jason Puncheon	7	0	0	7
15	MF	(Australia) Mile Jedinak	1	0	0	1
16	FW	(England) Dwight Gayle	7	1	0	8
17	FW	(England) Glenn Murray	1	0	0	1
18	FW	(England) Aaron Wilbraham	0	1	0	1
19	DF	(Wales) Danny Gabbidon	1	0	0	1
27	DF	(Republic of Ireland) Damien Delaney	1	0	0	1
28	MF	(Wales) Joe Ledley	2	0	0	2
29	FW	(Morocco) Marouane Chamakh	5	1	0	6
30	FW	(England) Cameron Jerome	2	0	0	2
46	MF	(Scotland) Barry Bannan	1	0	0	1
Own goal			1	0	0	1
Total			33	3	1	37

=== Disciplinary record ===
As of 11 May 2014

No.	Pos.	Name	Premier League			FA Cup			League Cup			Total		
No.	Pos.	Name	Yellow card	(yellow card) (yellow-red card)	Red card	Yellow card	(yellow card) (yellow-red card)	Red card	Yellow card	(yellow card) (yellow-red card)	Red card	Yellow card	(yellow card) (yellow-red card)	Red card
2	DF	(England) Joel Ward	3	0	0	0	0	0	0	0	0	3	0	0
3	DF	(Jamaica) Adrian Mariappa	6	0	0	1	0	0	0	0	0	7	0	0
4	DF	(Norway) Jonathan Parr	0	0	0	1	0	0	0	0	0	1	0	0
6	DF	(England) Scott Dann	4	0	0	0	0	0	0	0	0	4	0	0
7	MF	(Democratic Republic of the Congo) Yannick Bolasie	1	0	1	0	0	0	0	0	0	1	0	1
8	MF	(South Africa) Kagisho Dikgacoi	3	0	1	0	0	0	0	0	0	3	0	1
12	MF	(England) Stuart O'Keefe	2	0	0	0	0	0	1	0	0	3	0	0
13	MF	(England) Jason Puncheon	2	0	0	0	0	0	1	0	0	2	0	0
14	MF	(England) Jerome Thomas	2	0	0	0	0	0	0	0	0	2	0	0
15	MF	(Australia) Mile Jedinak	7	0	0	0	0	0	0	0	0	7	0	0
17	FW	(England) Glenn Murray	1	0	0	0	0	0	0	0	0	1	0	0
18	FW	(England) Aaron Wilbraham	0	0	0	1	0	0	0	0	0	1	0	0
21	DF	(England) Dean Moxey	2	0	0	0	0	0	0	0	0	2	0	0
27	DF	(Republic of Ireland) Damien Delaney	9	0	0	0	0	0	0	0	0	9	0	0
28	MF	(Wales) Joe Ledley	1	0	0	0	0	0	0	0	0	1	0	0
29	FW	(Morocco) Marouane Chamakh	9	0	0	0	0	0	0	0	0	9	0	0
30	FW	(England) Cameron Jerome	4	0	0	1	0	0	0	0	0	5	0	0
38	MF	(England) Hiram Boateng	0	0	0	1	0	0	0	0	0	1	0	0
46	MF	(Scotland) Barry Bannan	1	0	0	0	0	0	0	0	0	1	0	0
Total			57	0	2	5	0	0	1	0	0	63	0	2

=== Goalkeeper statistics ===
As of 11 May 2014

No.	Nat.	Name	Premier League		FA Cup		League Cup		Total	
No.	Nat.	Name	Conceded	Clean Sheets	Conceded	Clean Sheets	Conceded	Clean Sheets	Conceded	Clean Sheets
1	ARG	Julián Speroni	46	12	2	1	0	0	48	13
25	SCO	Neil Alexander	0	0	0	0	2	0	2	0
26	WAL	Wayne Hennessey	2	0	0	0	0	0	2	0
Total			48	12	2	1	2	0	52	13

== Pre-season and friendlies ==
20 July 2013	Dagenham and Redbridge	1–2	Crystal Palace	London, England
15:00 BST	Elito 67' (pen.)	Report	Nuhiu 34'; Garvan 57' (pen.)	Stadium: Victoria Road

23 July 2013	Gillingham	0–3	Crystal Palace	Kent, England
19:30 BST		Report	Moxey 21'; Dobbie 68'; Owusu-Abeyie 73'	Stadium: Priestfield Stadium

27 July 2013	Crawley Town	3–0	Crystal Palace	West Sussex, England
15:00 BST	Clarke 28'; Torres 75'; Sadler 88'	Report		Stadium: Broadfield Stadium

3 August 2013	Waterford United	0–4	Crystal Palace	Waterford, Ireland
18:00 BST			Dobbie 28'; Gayle 76'; Sekajja 87'; Sow 90+1'	Stadium: Waterford Regional Sports Centre

6 August 2013	Dulwich Hamlet	1–4	Crystal Palace	London, England
19:45 BST				Stadium: Champion Hill

10 August 2013	Crystal Palace	0–1	Lazio	London, England
15:00 BST			Klose 24'	Stadium: Selhurst Park

Last updated:18 July 2013
Source:Crystal Palace F.C.

== Competitions ==
=== Overall ===
Competition	Started round	Current position / round	Final position / round	First match	Last match
Premier League	—	—	11th	18 August 2013	11 May 2014
League Cup	2nd round	—	2nd round	27 August 2013	27 August 2013
FA Cup	3rd round	—	4th round	4 January 2014	25 January 2014

Updated to match played 11 May 2014
Source: Competitions

=== Premier League ===
==== League table ====
Pos	Team	Pld	W	D	L	GF	GA	GD	Pts
9	Stoke City	38	13	11	14	45	52	−7	50
10	Newcastle United	38	15	4	19	43	59	−16	49
11	Crystal Palace	38	13	6	19	33	48	−15	45
12	Swansea City	38	11	9	18	54	54	0	42
13	West Ham United	38	11	7	20	40	51	−11	40

Source: Barclays Premier League
Rules for classification: 1) Points; 2) Goal difference; 3) Goals scored; 4) Play-offs (only if needed to decide champion, teams for relegation or teams for UEFA competitions).

==== Results summary ====
Overall								Home						Away					
Pld	W	D	L	GF	GA	GD	Pts	W	D	L	GF	GA	GD	W	D	L	GF	GA	GD
38	13	6	19	33	48	−15	45	8	3	8	18	23	−5	5	3	11	15	25	−10

Last updated: 11 May 2014.
Source: Premier League

==== Results by matchday ====
Matchday	1	2	3	4	5	6	7	8	9	10	11	12	13	14	15	16	17	18	19	20	21	22	23	24	25	26	27	28	29	30	31	32	33	34	35	36	37	38
Ground	H	A	H	A	H	A	A	H	H	A	H	A	A	H	H	A	H	A	A	H	A	H	H	A	H	H	A	H	A	A	H	A	H	A	A	H	H	A
Result	L	L	W	L	L	L	L	L	L	L	D	W	L	W	W	L	L	W	L	D	L	W	W	L	W	L	D	L	D	L	W	W	W	W	W	L	D	D
Position	13	18	12	17	19	19	19	19	19	20	20	19	20	19	18	18	18	17	17	18	20	16	14	17	14	15	16	16	17	17	16	14	12	11	11	11	11	11

Updated to match(es) played on 11 May 2014. Source: Statto.com
A = Away; H = Home; W = Win; D = Draw; L = Loss

==== Matches ====
Source:BBC Sport

18 August 2013 1	Crystal Palace	0–1	Tottenham Hotspur	Selhurst, London
13:30 BST	Jedinak (yellow card) 90'	Report	Soldado 50' (pen.)	Stadium: Selhurst Park; Attendance: 23,285; Referee: Mark Clattenburg

24 August 2013 2	Stoke City	2–1	Crystal Palace	Stoke-on-Trent
15:00 BST	Shawcross (yellow card) 37', (goal) 62'; Adam 58'; Cameron (yellow card) 84'; Walters (yellow card) 88'	Report	Chamakh 31'	Stadium: Britannia Stadium; Attendance: 25,270; Referee: Andre Marriner

31 August 2013 3	Crystal Palace	3–1	Sunderland	Selhurst, London
17:30 BST	Gabbidon 9'; Delaney (yellow card) 25'; Gayle 79' (pen.); O'Keefe 90'	Report	Fletcher 64'; O'Shea (red card) 78'	Stadium: Selhurst Park; Attendance: 22,671; Referee: Lee Probert

14 September 2013 4	Manchester United	2–0	Crystal Palace	Greater Manchester, Manchester
12:45 BST	Young (yellow card) 19'; Van Persie 45' (pen.); Rooney 81'	Report	Dikgacoi (red card) 44'; Moxey (yellow card) 45+2'; Chamakh (yellow card) 55'	Stadium: Old Trafford; Attendance: 75,170; Referee: Jonathan Moss

22 September 2013 5	Crystal Palace	0–2	Swansea City	Selhurst, London
13:30 BST	Moxey (yellow card) 28'; Chamakh (yellow card) 52'	Report	Michu 2'; Dyer 48'; Rangel (yellow card) 52'; Flores (yellow card) 73'	Stadium: Selhurst Park; Attendance: 22,466; Referee: Kevin Friend

29 September 2013 6	Southampton	2–0	Crystal Palace	Southampton
15:00 BST	Davis (yellow card) 17'; Osvaldo 47'; Lambert 49'	Report	Chamakh (yellow card) 28'; Mariappa (yellow card) 68'	Stadium: St Mary's Stadium; Attendance: 30,699; Referee: Martin Atkinson

5 October 2013 7	Liverpool	3–1	Crystal Palace	Anfield, Liverpool
15:00 BST	Suárez 13'; Sturridge 17'; Gerrard 38' (pen.); Sterling (yellow card) 75'; Aspas (yellow card) 90+4'	Report	O'Keefe (yellow card) 10'; Gayle 76'	Stadium: Anfield; Attendance: 44,721; Referee: Anthony Taylor

21 October 2013 8	Crystal Palace	1–4	Fulham	Selhurst, London
20:00 BST	Mariappa 7'	Report	Kasami 19'; Sidwell 45'; Berbatov 50'; Senderos 55'; Richardsom (yellow card) 81'	Stadium: Selhurst Park; Attendance: 24,881; Referee: Lee Mason

26 October 2013 9	Crystal Palace	0–2	Arsenal	Selhurst, London
12:45 BST		Report	Arteta 47' (pen.), (red card) 65'; Giroud 87'	Stadium: Selhurst Park; Attendance: 25,050; Referee: Chris Foy

2 November 2013 10	West Bromwich Albion	2–0	Crystal Palace	West Bromwich
15:00 BST	Berahino 44'; McAuley 83'	Report	Thomas (yellow card) 71'	Stadium: The Hawthorns; Attendance: 26,397; Referee: Neil Swarbrick

9 November 2013 11	Crystal Palace	0–0	Everton	Selhurst, London
15:00 BST	Jedinak (yellow card) 87'	Report		Stadium: Selhurst Park; Attendance: 25,231; Referee: Craig Pawson

23 November 2013 12	Hull City	0–1	Crystal Palace	Kingston upon Hull
15:00 GMT	Elmohamady (yellow card) 45+3'; Huddlestone (yellow card) 66'	Report	Dikgacoi (yellow card) 54'; Bolasie (red card) 78'; Bannan 81'	Stadium: KC Stadium; Attendance: 23,043; Referee: Anthony Taylor

30 November 2013 13	Norwich City	1–0	Crystal Palace	Norwich
15:00 GMT	Hooper 30'; Martin (yellow card) 82'	Report	Jedinak (yellow card) 63'	Stadium: Carrow Road; Attendance: 26,851; Referee: Chris Foy

3 December 2013 14	Crystal Palace	1–0	West Ham United	Selhurst, London
20:00 GMT	Delaney (yellow card) 25'; Chamakh 31'	Report	Tomkins (yellow card) 67'; Morrison (yellow card) 90+5'	Stadium: Selhurst Park; Attendance: 23,891; Referee: Lee Mason

7 December 2013 15	Crystal Palace	2–0	Cardiff City	Selhurst, London
15:00 GMT	Jerome 6'; Chamakh 57'	Report		Stadium: Selhurst Park; Attendance: 23,705; Referee: Mike Jones

14 December 2013 16	Chelsea	2–1	Crystal Palace	Fulham, London
15:00 GMT	Torres 16'; Ramires 35'; Essien (yellow card) 58'; Ivanović (yellow card) 69'	Report	Chamakh 29' (yellow card) 43'	Stadium: Stamford Bridge; Attendance: 41,608; Referee: Mark Clattenburg

21 December 2013 17	Crystal Palace	0–3	Newcastle United	Selhurst, London
15:00 GMT	Chamakh (yellow card) 83'	report	Cabaye 25'; Gabbidon 38' (o.g.); Tioté (yellow card) 64'; Coloccini (yellow card) 67'; Ben Arfa 86' (pen.)	Stadium: Selhurst Park; Attendance: 24,936; Referee: Neil Swarbrick

26 December 2013 18	Aston Villa	0–1	Crystal Palace	Birmingham
15:00 GMT	Baker (yellow card) 35'; El Ahmadi (yellow card) 72'	report	Bannan (yellow card) 37'; Jerome (yellow card) 67'; Gayle 90+2'	Stadium: Villa Park; Attendance: 37,752; Referee: Howard Webb

28 December 2013 19	Manchester City	1–0	Crystal Palace	Manchester
15:00 GMT	Džeko 66'; Silva (yellow card) 89'	Report	Delaney (yellow card) 81'	Stadium: Etihad Stadium; Attendance: 47,107; Referee: Andre Marriner

1 January 2014 20	Crystal Palace	1–1	Norwich City	Selhurst, London
15:00 GMT	Dikgacoi (yellow card) 16'; Chamakh (yellow card) 41'; Puncheon 44' (pen.); Jedinak (yellow card) 84'	Report	Johnson 39'; Hoolahan (yellow card) 41'; Fer (yellow card) 43' (yellow-red card) 82'	Stadium: Selhurst Park; Attendance: 25,189; Referee: Mike Dean

11 January 2014 21	Tottenham Hotspur	2–0	Crystal Palace	Tottenham, London
15:00 GMT	Eriksen 50'; Defoe 72'; Naughton (yellow card) 80'	Report	Mariappa (yellow card) 70'; Jedinak (yellow card) 77'	Stadium: White Hart Lane; Attendance: 36,102; Referee: Michael Oliver

18 January 2014 22	Crystal Palace	1–0	Stoke City	Selhurst, London
15:00 GMT	Puncheon 51'	Report	Arnautović (yellow card) 82'; Nzonzi (yellow card) 83'	Stadium: Selhurst Park; Attendance: 24,440; Referee: Lee Mason

28 January 2014 23	Crystal Palace	1–0	Hull City	Selhurst, London
20:00 GMT	Puncheon 16'; Delaney (yellow card) 22'; Chamakh (yellow card) 63'; Jerome (yellow card) 83'; O'Keefe (yellow card) 90+1'	Report	McGregor (red card) 90+2'	Stadium: Selhurst Park; Attendance: 22,519; Referee: Roger East

2 February 2014 24	Arsenal	2–0	Crystal Palace	Islington, London
16:00 GMT	Oxlade-Chamberlain 47', 73'; Mertsacker (yellow card) 86'	Report	Chamakh (yellow card) 42'; Delaney (yellow card) 68'	Stadium: Emirates Stadium; Attendance: 60,005; Referee: Jonathan Moss

8 February 2014 25	Crystal Palace	3–1	West Bromwich Albion	Selhurst, London
15:00 GMT	Ince 15'; Ledley 27'; Chamakh 69' (pen.)	Report	Jones (yellow card) 39'; Bifouma 46'; Yacob (yellow card) 65'; Brunt (yellow card) 79'	Stadium: Selhurst Park; Attendance: 24,501; Referee: Chris Foy

22 February 2014 26	Crystal Palace	0–2	Manchester United	Selhurst, London
17:30 BST		Report	Vidić (yellow card) 59'; Van Persie 62' (pen.); Rooney 68'; Giggs (yellow card) 90+1'	Stadium: Selhurst Park; Attendance: 24,571; Referee: Michael Oliver

2 March 2014 27	Swansea City	1–1	Crystal Palace	Swansea
16:00 GMT	De Guzmán 25'; Britton (yellow card) 74'; Flores (red card) 81'	Report	Jedinak (yellow card) 35'; Jerome (yellow card) 48'; Dann (yellow card) 63'; Murray 82' (pen.); Thomas (yellow card) 90+2'	Stadium: Liberty Stadium; Attendance: 20,240; Referee: Mike Dean

8 March 2014 28	Crystal Palace	0–1	Southampton	Selhurst, London
15:00 GMT	Jedinak (yellow card) 57'	Report	Rodriguez 37'; Fonte (yellow card) 45+1'; Lovren (yellow card) 48'; Davis (yellow card) 55'; Schneiderlin (yellow card) 66'; Clyne (yellow card) 88'	Stadium: Selhurst Park; Attendance: 25,073; Referee: Howard Webb

15 March 2014 29	Sunderland	0–0	Crystal Palace	Sunderland
15:00 GMT	Bridcutt (yellow card) 19'; Larsson (yellow card) 57'; Gardner (yellow card) 64'; Brown (yellow card) 79'	Report	Mariappa (yellow card) 8'; Ward (yellow card) 13'; Dikgacoi (yellow card) 45+2'; Delaney (yellow card) 58'	Stadium: Stadium of Light; Attendance: 43,636; Referee: Neil Swarbrick

22 March 2014 30	Newcastle United	1–0	Crystal Palace	Newcastle upon Tyne
15:00 BST	Cissé 90+4'	Report	Delaney (yellow card) 85'	Stadium: St James' Park; Attendance: 51,588; Referee: Lee Probert

29 March 2014 31	Crystal Palace	1–0	Chelsea	Selhurst, London
15:00 GMT	Bolasie (yellow card) 13'; Puncheon (yellow card) 20'; Terry 52' (o.g.); Dann (yellow card) 77'; Mariappa (yellow card) 90'	Report	Terry (yellow card) 32'	Stadium: Selhurst Park; Attendance: 25,166; Referee: Lee Mason

5 April 2014 32	Cardiff City	0–3	Crystal Palace	Cardiff
15:00 BST	Turner (yellow card) 68'; Medel (yellow card) 70'	Report	Puncheon 31', 88'; Jerome (yellow card) 35'; Ward (yellow card) 38'; Ledley 71', (yellow card) 78'	Stadium: Cardiff City Stadium; Attendance: 27,687; Referee: Phil Dowd

12 April 2014 33	Crystal Palace	1–0	Aston Villa	Selhurst, London
15:00 BST	Puncheon 76'	Report	Baker (yellow card) 62'; Bertrand (yellow card) 70'	Stadium: Selhurst Park; Attendance: 25,564; Referee: Howard Webb

16 April 2014 34	Everton	2–3	Crystal Palace	Liverpool
19:45 BST	Naismith 61'; Baines (yellow card) 65'; Mirallas 86'	Report	Puncheon 23', (yellow card) 90+3'; Delaney (yellow card) 44'; Dann 49'; Jerome 73'	Stadium: Goodison Park; Attendance: 39,333; Referee: Andre Marriner

19 April 2014 35	West Ham United	0–1	Crystal Palace	Upton Park, London
15:00 BST	McCartney (yellow card) 49'	Report	Jedinak 59' (pen.); Murray (yellow card) 90+3'	Stadium: Boleyn Ground; Attendance: 34,977; Referee: Martin Atkinson

27 April 2014 36	Crystal Palace	0–2	Manchester City	Selhurst, London
16:10 BST	Delaney (yellow card) 24'; Dann (yellow card) 56'; Ward (yellow card) 71'	Report	Džeko 4'; Zabaleta (yellow card) 33'; Touré 43'	Stadium: Selhurst Park; Attendance: 24,769; Referee: Howard Webb

5 May 2014 37	Crystal Palace	3–3	Liverpool	Selhurst, London
20:00 BST	Mariappa (yellow card) 30'; Dann (yellow card) 67'; Delaney 79'; Gayle 81', 88'	Report	Allen 18', (yellow card) 25'; Suárez (yellow card) 50', (goal) 55'; Delaney 53' (o.g.); Škrtel (yellow card) 63'	Stadium: Selhurst Park; Attendance: 25,261; Referee: Mark Clattenburg

11 May 2014 38	Fulham	2–2	Crystal Palace	Fulham, London
15:00 BST	Amorebieta (yellow card) 58'; Woodrow 61'; Parker (yellow card) 83'; David 90+4', (yellow card) 90+4'	Report	Chamakh (yellow card) 12'; Gayle 28', 83', (yellow card) 84'	Stadium: Craven Cottage; Attendance: 24,447; Referee: Kevin Friend

=== FA Cup ===
4 January 2014 Third round	West Bromwich Albion	0–2	Crystal Palace	West Bromwich
15:00 GMT	Gera (yellow card) 27'; Dawson (yellow card) 55'; Lugano (yellow card) 56'; Amalfitano (yellow card) 90+3'	Report	Gayle 23'; Boateng (yellow card) 42'; Parr (yellow card) 61'; Mariappa (yellow card) 73'; Chamakh 90+5'	Stadium: The Hawthorns; Attendance: 12,700; Referee: Phil Dowd

25 January 2014 Fourth round	Wigan Athletic	2–1	Crystal Palace	Wigan
15.00 GMT	Watson 36'; McClean 78'; Perch (yellow card) 90+2'; Boyce (yellow card) 90+5'	Report	Jerome (yellow card) 10'; Wilbraham 69', (yellow card) 84'	Stadium: DW Stadium; Attendance: 9,542; Referee: Michael Jones

=== League Cup ===
27 August 2013 Second round	Bristol City	2–1	Crystal Palace	Bristol
19:45 BST	Bryan (yellow card) 23'; Emmanuel-Thomas 59'; Wagstaff 71'	Report	O'Keefe (yellow card) 65'; Garvan 90+4'	Stadium: Ashton Gate Stadium; Attendance: 6,816; Referee: Iain Williamson

== Overall summary ==
=== Summary ===
As of 11 May 2014

Games played	41 (38 Premier League, 2 FA Cup, 1 League Cup)
Home played	19 (19 Premier League, 0 FA Cup, 0 League Cup)
Away played	23 (19 Premier League, 2 FA Cup, 1 League Cup)
Games won	14 (13 Premier League, 1 FA Cup, 0 League Cup)
Home won	8 (8 Premier League, 0 FA Cup, 0 League Cup)
Away won	6 (5 Premier League, 1 FA Cup, 0 League Cup)
Games drawn	6 (6 Premier League, 0 FA Cup, 0 League Cup)
Home drawn	3 (3 Premier League, 0 FA Cup, 0 League Cup)
Away drawn	3 (3 Premier League, 0 FA Cup, 0 League Cup)
Games lost	21 (19 Premier League, 1 FA Cup, 1 League Cup)
Home lost	8 (8 Premier League, 0 FA Cup, 0 League Cup)
Away lost	13 (11 Premier League, 1 FA Cup, 1 League Cup)
Goals scored	37 (33 Premier League, 3 FA Cup, 1 League Cup)
Home scored	18 (18 Premier League, 0 FA Cup, 0 League Cup)
Away scored	19 (15 Premier League, 3 FA Cup, 1 League Cup)
Goals conceded	52 (48 Premier League, 2 FA Cup, 2 League Cup)
Home conceded	23 (23 Premier League, 0 FA Cup, 0 League Cup)
Away conceded	29 (25 Premier League, 2 FA Cup, 2 League Cup)
Goal difference	−15
Home goal difference	−5
Away goal difference	−10
Clean sheets	13 (12 Premier League, 1 FA Cup, 0 League Cup)
Home clean sheets	7 (7 Premier League, 0 FA Cup, 0 League Cup)
Away clean sheets	6 (5 Premier League, 1 FA Cup, 0 League Cup)
Yellow cards	63 (57 Premier League, 5 FA Cup, 1 League Cup)
Second yellow cards	0 (0 Premier League, 0 FA Cup, 0 League Cup)
Red cards	2 (2 Premier League, 0 FA Cup, 0 League Cup)
Worst discipline	Dikgacoi (3 (yellow card) , 1 (red card) )
Best result	0–3 vs Cardiff City (Away)
Worst result	0–3 vs Newcastle United (Home), 1–4 vs Fulham (Home)
Most appearances	Speroni (39)
Top scorer	Gayle (8 goals)
Points	45

=== Score overview ===
As of 11 May 2014

Opposition	Home score	Away score	Double	Point	Agg.
Arsenal	0–2	0–2	No	0	0–4
Aston Villa	1–0	1–0	Yes	6	2–0
Cardiff City	2–0	3–0	Yes	6	5–0
Chelsea	1–0	1–2	No	3	2–2
Everton	0–0	3–2	No	4	3–2
Fulham	1–4	2–2	No	1	3–6
Hull City	1–0	1–0	Yes	6	2–0
Liverpool	3–3	1–3	No	1	4–6
Manchester City	0–2	0–1	No	0	0–3
Manchester United	0–2	0–2	No	0	0–4
Newcastle United	0–3	0–1	No	0	0–4
Norwich City	1–1	0–1	No	1	1–2
Southampton	0–1	0–2	No	0	0–3
Stoke City	1–0	1–2	No	3	2–2
Sunderland	3–1	0–0	No	4	3–1
Swansea City	0–2	1–1	No	1	1–3
Tottenham Hotspur	0–1	0–2	No	0	0–3
West Bromwich Albion	3–1	0–2	No	3	3–3
West Ham United	1–0	1–0	Yes	6	2–0
