= 2013–14 Tottenham Hotspur F.C. season =

English football club season

Tottenham Hotspur
2013–14 season
- Owner: ENIC International Ltd.
- Chairman: Daniel Levy
- Manager: André Villas-Boas (until 16 December 2013); Tim Sherwood (from 23 December 2013)
- Stadium: White Hart Lane
- Premier League: 6th
- FA Cup: Third round
- League Cup: Fifth round
- UEFA Europa League: Round of 16
- Top goalscorer: League: Emmanuel Adebayor (11); All: Emmanuel Adebayor (14)
- Highest home attendance: 36,284 vs. Dnipro Dnipropetrovsk (19 February 2014, Europa League)
- Lowest home attendance: 23,101 vs. Anzhi Makhachkala (12 December 2013, Europa League)
- Average home league attendance: 35,808
Home colours	Away colours	Third colours

The 2013–14 season was Tottenham Hotspur's 22nd season in the Premier League and 36th successive season in the top division of the English football league system.

The campaign featured Tottenham's 12th appearance in the UEFA Europa League (formerly the UEFA Cup), entering the Play-off round due to finishing fifth in the 2012–13 Premier League season.

== First-team squad ==
Note: Flags indicate national team as defined under FIFA eligibility rules; some limited exceptions apply. Players may hold more than one non-FIFA nationality.

No.	Pos.	Nation	Player
1	GK	BRA	Heurelho Gomes
2	DF	ENG	Kyle Walker
3	DF	ENG	Danny Rose
4	DF	FRA	Younès Kaboul (2nd vice-captain)
5	DF	BEL	Jan Vertonghen
6	DF	ROU	Vlad Chiricheș
7	MF	ENG	Aaron Lennon (vice-captain)
8	MF	BRA	Paulinho
9	FW	ESP	Roberto Soldado
10	FW	TOG	Emmanuel Adebayor
11	MF	ARG	Erik Lamela
15	MF	FRA	Étienne Capoue

No.	Pos.	Nation	Player
16	DF	ENG	Kyle Naughton
17	MF	ENG	Andros Townsend
19	MF	BEL	Mousa Dembélé
20	DF	ENG	Michael Dawson (captain)
21	MF	BEL	Nacer Chadli
22	MF	ISL	Gylfi Sigurðsson
23	MF	DEN	Christian Eriksen
24	GK	USA	Brad Friedel
25	GK	FRA	Hugo Lloris
30	MF	BRA	Sandro
35	DF	ENG	Zeki Fryers
37	FW	ENG	Harry Kane
42	MF	ALG	Nabil Bentaleb

== Transfers ==
=== In ===
Position	Player	Transferred from	Fee	Transfer window	Date	Source
MF	(Brazil) Paulinho	(Brazil) Corinthians	£17,000,000	Summer	6 July 2013	
FW	(Belgium) Nacer Chadli	(Netherlands) Twente	£7,000,000	Summer	21 July 2013	
FW	(Spain) Roberto Soldado	(Spain) Valencia	£26,000,000	Summer	1 August 2013	
MF	(France) Étienne Capoue	(France) Toulouse	£9,000,000	Summer	15 August 2013	
DF	(Romania) Vlad Chiricheș	(Romania) Steaua București	£8,500,000	Summer	30 August 2013	
MF	(Denmark) Christian Eriksen	(Netherlands) Ajax	£11,500,000	Summer	30 August 2013	
MF	(Argentina) Erik Lamela	(Italy) Roma	£30,000,000	Summer	30 August 2013	

Total spending: ▼£109,000,000

=== Out ===
Position	Player	Transfer	Transferred to	Fee	Transfer window	Date	Source
DF	(France) William Gallas	Released	(Australia) Perth Glory	N/A	Summer	30 June 2013	
MF	(England) David Bentley	Released	Free agent	N/A	Summer	30 June 2013	
MF	(England) John Bostock	Released	(Belgium) Royal Antwerp	N/A	Summer	30 June 2013	
DF	(England) Jack Barthram	Released	(England) Swindon Town	N/A	Summer	30 June 2013	
MF	(England) Jack Munns	Released	(England) Birmingham City	N/A	Summer	30 June 2013	
MF	(England) Jake Nicholson	Released	(Scotland) Greenock Morton	N/A	Summer	30 June 2013	
MF	(England) Dean Parrett	Released	(England) Stevenage	N/A	Summer	30 June 2013	
DF	(England) Nathan Byrne	Released	(England) Swindon Town	N/A	Summer	9 July 2013	
DF	(England) Steven Caulker	Sold	(Wales) Cardiff City	£9,000,000	Summer	31 July 2013	
MF	(United States) Clint Dempsey	Sold	(United States) Seattle Sounders FC	£6,000,000	Summer	2 August 2013	
MF	(England) Tom Huddlestone	Sold	(England) Hull City	£5,000,000	Summer	14 August 2013	
MF	(England) Scott Parker	Sold	(England) Fulham	£3,500,000	Summer	19 August 2013	
MF	(Australia) Massimo Luongo	Sold	(England) Swindon Town	£400,000	Summer	31 August 2013	
FW	(Wales) Gareth Bale	Sold	(Spain) Real Madrid	£85,300,000	Summer	1 September 2013	
FW	(England) Simon Dawkins	Sold	(England) Derby County	£500,000	Winter	3 January 2014	
FW	(England) Jermain Defoe	Sold	(Canada) Toronto FC	£6,000,000	Winter	28 February 2014	
DF	(England) Adam Smith	Sold	(England) Bournemouth	Undisclosed	Winter	28 January 2014	
FW	(England) Darren McQueen	Released	(England) Ipswich Town	N/A		7 May 2014	

Total income: ▲£115,700,000+

=== Loan out ===
Position	Player	Loaned to	Start	End	Source
MF	(Australia) Massimo Luongo	(England) Swindon Town	2 July 2013	31 August 2013	
DF	(England) Grant Hall	(England) Swindon Town	2 July 2013	2014	
MF	(England) Alex Pritchard	(England) Swindon Town	9 July 2013	29 April 2014	
MF	(England) Ryan Mason	(England) Swindon Town	23 July 2013	2014	
MF	(Croatia) Tomislav Gomelt	(Belgium) Royal Antwerp	24 July 2013	2014	
DF	(England) Adam Smith	(England) Derby County	29 July 2013	2 December 2013	
DF	(South Africa) Bongani Khumalo	(England) Doncaster Rovers	31 July 2013	2014	
MF	(England) Jake Livermore	(England) Hull City	14 August 2013	2014	
FW	(Spain) Iago Falque	(Spain) Rayo Vallecano	24 August 2013	2014	
DF	(Cameroon) Benoît Assou-Ekotto	(England) Queens Park Rangers	2 September 2013	2014	
MF	(England) Tom Carroll	(England) Queens Park Rangers	2 September 2013	2014	
FW	(Spain) Cristian Ceballos	(Portugal) Arouca	5 September 2013	2014	
FW	(England) Simon Dawkins	(England) Derby County	18 October 2013	3 January 2014	
GK	(Chile) Lawrence Vigouroux	(England) Hyde	25 October 2013	24 January 2014	
FW	(England) Shaq Coulthirst	(England) Leyton Orient	3 January 2014	3 February 2014	
FW	(England) Jonathan Obika	(England) Brighton & Hove Albion	8 January 2014	17 March 2014	
MF	(England) Ryan Fredericks	(England) Millwall	17 January 2014	2014	
MF	(Angola) Laste Dombaxe	(England) Bolton Development Squad	21 January 2014	February 2014	
MF	(Germany) Lewis Holtby	(England) Fulham	31 January 2014	2014	
GK	(England) Luke McGee	(England) Harlow Town	24 February 2014	March 2014	
GK	(England) Jonathan Miles	(England) Whitehawk	8 March 2014	8 April 2014	
FW	(England) Jonathan Obika	(England) Charlton Athletic	17 March 2014	2014	
MF	(England) Grant Ward	(United States) Chicago Fire	22 March 2014	31 December 2014	
FW	(England) Shaq Coulthirst	(England) Torquay United	28 March 2014	2014	

==== Spending ====
Summer: ▼£109,000,000

Winter: £0

Total: ▼£109,000,000

==== Income ====
Summer: ▲£109,200,000

Winter: ▲£6,500,000+

Total: ▲£115,700,000+

==== Expenditure ====
Summer: ▲£200,000

Winter: ▲£6,500,000+

Total: ▲£6,700,000+

== Friendlies ==
=== Pre-season ===
16 July 2013	Swindon Town	1–1	Tottenham Hotspur	Swindon
	Williams 76'	Report	Bale 15'	Stadium: County Ground; Attendance: 10,465; Referee: S Hooper

18 July 2013	Kingstonian	0–4	Spurs XI	London
		Report	McEvoy 7'; Obika 20'; Dawkins 58'; Ceballos 90'	Stadium: Kingsmeadow; Attendance: 654; Referee: D Sheldrake

19 July 2013	Colchester United	0–0	Tottenham Hotspur	Colchester
		Report		Stadium: Weston Homes Community Stadium; Attendance: 9,988; Referee: M Russell

24 July 2013	Tottenham Hotspur	1–3	Sunderland	Hong Kong
	Sigurðsson 27'	Report	Cabral 32'; Brown (unk.); Karlsson 89'	Stadium: Hong Kong Stadium; Attendance: 35,950; Referee: Liu Kwok Man

27 July 2013	South China	0–6	Tottenham Hotspur	Hong Kong
		Report	Tse 12' (o.g.); Dempsey 33'; Defoe 44', 53', 79'; Townsend 86'	Stadium: Hong Kong Stadium; Attendance: 39,544

31 July 2013	Milton Keynes Dons	1–0	Spurs XI	Milton Keynes
	Rasulo 34'	Report		Stadium: Stadium mk Attendance: 8,671; Referee: K Stroud

3 August 2013	AS Monaco	5–2	Tottenham Hotspur	Monaco
	Raggi 14'; Ocampos 46'; Falcao 48', 64'; Obbadi 70'	Report	Kane 57'; Townsend 85'	Stadium: Stade Louis II

7 August 2013	Cambridge City	0–5	Spurs XI	Impington
		Report	Bentaleb 25'; Falque 37', 74'; Fredericks 55'; Ceballos 78'	Stadium: Glassworld Stadium; Attendance: 850

8 August 2013	Tottenham Hotspur	11–0	Enfield Town	London
	Soldado (unk.); Sigurðsson (unk.); Townsend (unk.); Kane (unk.); Lennon (unk.)	Report		Stadium: White Hart Lane; Attendance: 0

10 August 2013	Espanyol	1–1	Tottenham Hotspur	London
	López 44'	Report	Soldado 29' (pen.)	Stadium: White Hart Lane; Attendance: 35,739; Referee: A Marriner

13 August 2013	Chelmsford City	1 – 4	Spurs XI	Chelmsford
	Goulding 17' (pen.)	Report	Coulthirst 13', 71', 73'; D. McQueen 27'	Stadium: Melbourne Stadium; Attendance: 2,065

=== Mid-season Spurs XI friendlies ===
11 September 2013	Spurs XI	3 – 2	Ipswich Town	London
	Dawkins 19', 36'; McEvoy (unk.)	Report	Marriott (unk.), 78'	Stadium: Hotspur Way

24 September 2013	Spurs XI	1 – 0	Brighton & Hove Albion	London
	Bentaleb 16'	Report		Stadium: Hotspur Way

1 October 2013	Spurs XI	2 – 2	Queens Park Rangers	London
	McEvoy 19'; Dawkins 54'	Report	Chevantón 14'; Unk. 65' (pen.)	Stadium: Hotspur Way

16 October 2013	Athletic Bilbao	1 – 1	Spurs XI	Bilbao
	Unk. 49'	Report	Lancaster (unk.)	Stadium: Athletic Club Sport Centre

6 November 2013	Spurs XI	3 – 3	Colchester United	London
	Lancaster 39'; Coulibaly 58', 74'	Report	Bond 54'; Bonne 69', 87'	Stadium: Hotspur Way

23 December 2013	Spurs XI	2 – 2	Brighton & Hove Albion	London
	D. McQueen 35'; Lameiras 86'	Report	Goodwin 28'; Asmundsson (unk.)	Stadium: Hotspur Way

7 January 2014	Spurs XI	10 – 6	Charlton Athletic	London
	Obika 7' (unk.), 46' (unk.); Lamela (unk.); Chadli 40' (unk.); Holtby (unk.)	Report	Sho-Silva 1'; Harriott 42' (unk.); Unk. 52'; Lennon (unk.); Azeez (unk.)	Stadium: Hotspur Way

23 January 2014	West Ham	0 – 3	Spurs XI	London
		Report	Kane 12', 72'; Paulinho (unk.)	Stadium: Upton Park

=== Postseason ===
12 May 2014	Tottenham Hotspur	3 – 6	Ledley Guest XI	London
	Adebayor 35' (pen.); Oduwa 48'; Capoue 76'		King 16' (pen.); Sheringham 41', 44'; Saha 53', 69', 90'	Stadium: White Hart Lane; Attendance: 34,633; Referee: Howard Webb

In April, the club announced that the current Spurs XI would stage a testimonial in honour of one-club man Ledley King against a team named the 'Ledley Guest XI'. Former players who turned out for the Ledley Guest XI included Teddy Sheringham, Darren Anderton, Dimitar Berbatov, David Ginola, Peter Crouch, Edgar Davids; the team was captained by King himself, who opened the scoring with a penalty.

== Competitions ==
=== Overall ===
Competition	Started round	Final position / round	First match	Last match
Premier League	—	6th	18 August 2013	11 May 2014
FA Cup	3rd round	3rd round	4 January 2014	4 January 2014
League Cup	3rd round	5th round	24 September 2013	18 December 2013
UEFA Europa League	Play-off round	Round of 16	22 August 2013	20 March 2014

Updated to match played 19 May 2014
Source: Competitions

=== Premier League ===
==== League table ====
Pos	Team	Pld	W	D	L	GF	GA	GD	Pts	Qualification or relegation
4	Arsenal	38	24	7	7	68	41	+27	79	Qualification for the Champions League play-off round
5	Everton	38	21	9	8	61	39	+22	72	Qualification for the Europa League group stage
6	Tottenham Hotspur	38	21	6	11	55	51	+4	69	Qualification for the Europa League play-off round (Note: Since the winners of 2013–14 Football League Cup (Manchester City) qualified for the Champions League, the spot awarded to them (Europa League play-off round) was passed to the 6th-placed team.)
7	Manchester United	38	19	7	12	64	43	+21	64	
8	Southampton	38	15	11	12	54	46	+8	56	

Source: Barclays Premier League
Rules for classification: 1) Points; 2) Goal difference; 3) Goals scored; 4) Play-offs (only if needed to decide champion, teams for relegation or teams for UEFA competitions).

==== Results summary ====
Overall								Home						Away					
Pld	W	D	L	GF	GA	GD	Pts	W	D	L	GF	GA	GD	W	D	L	GF	GA	GD
38	21	6	11	55	51	+4	69	11	3	5	30	23	+7	10	3	6	25	28	−3

Last updated: 11 May 2014.
Source: Premier League

==== Results by matchday ====
Matchday	1	2	3	4	5	6	7	8	9	10	11	12	13	14	15	16	17	18	19	20	21	22	23	24	25	26	27	28	29	30	31	32	33	34	35	36	37	38
Ground	A	H	A	H	A	H	H	A	H	A	H	A	H	A	A	H	A	H	H	A	H	A	H	A	H	A	A	H	A	H	H	A	H	A	H	A	A	H
Result	W	W	L	W	W	D	L	W	W	D	L	L	D	W	W	L	W	D	W	W	W	W	L	D	W	W	L	W	L	L	W	L	W	D	W	W	L	W
Position	5	2	6	2	2	2	6	5	4	4	7	9	9	6	6	7	7	8	7	6	5	5	5	6	5	5	5	5	5	5	5	6	6	6	6	6	6	6

Updated to match(es) played on 11 May 2014. Source: Statto.com
A = Away; H = Home; W = Win; D = Draw; L = Loss

==== Matches ====
18 August 2013 1	Crystal Palace	0–1	Tottenham Hotspur	London
13:30 BST		Report	Soldado 50' (pen.)	Stadium: Selhurst Park; Attendance: 23,285; Referee: Mark Clattenburg

25 August 2013 2	Tottenham Hotspur	1–0	Swansea City	London
16:00 BST	Soldado 58' (pen.)	Report		Stadium: White Hart Lane; Attendance: 36,005; Referee: Neil Swarbrick

1 September 2013 3	Arsenal	1–0	Tottenham Hotspur	London
16:00 BST	Giroud 23'	Report		Stadium: Emirates Stadium; Attendance: 60,071; Referee: Michael Oliver

14 September 2013 4	Tottenham Hotspur	2–0	Norwich City	London
15:00 BST	Sigurðsson 28', 49'	Report		Stadium: White Hart Lane; Attendance: 35,952; Referee: Lee Mason

22 September 2013 5	Cardiff City	0–1	Tottenham Hotspur	Cardiff
16:00 BST		Report	Paulinho 90+3'	Stadium: Cardiff City Stadium; Attendance: 27,815; Referee: Mark Clattenburg

28 September 2013 6	Tottenham Hotspur	1–1	Chelsea	London
12:45 BST	Sigurðsson 19'	Report	Terry 65'	Stadium: White Hart Lane; Attendance: 35,857; Referee: Mike Dean

6 October 2013 7	Tottenham Hotspur	0–3	West Ham United	London
16:00 BST		Report	Reid 65'; Vaz Tê 72'; Morrison 79'	Stadium: White Hart Lane; Attendance: 35,977; Referee: Lee Probert

20 October 2013 8	Aston Villa	0–2	Tottenham Hotspur	Birmingham
16:00 BST		Report	Townsend 31'; Soldado 69'	Stadium: Villa Park; Attendance: 35,391; Referee: Phil Dowd

27 October 2013 9	Tottenham Hotspur	1–0	Hull City	London
16:00 GMT	Soldado 80' (pen.)	Report		Stadium: White Hart Lane; Attendance: 36,080; Referee: Michael Oliver

3 November 2013 10	Everton	0–0	Tottenham Hotspur	Liverpool
13:30 GMT		Report		Stadium: Goodison Park; Attendance: 38,378; Referee: Kevin Friend

10 November 2013 11	Tottenham Hotspur	0–1	Newcastle United	London
12:00 GMT		Report	Rémy 13'	Stadium: White Hart Lane; Attendance: 36,042; Referee: Chris Foy

24 November 2013 12	Manchester City	6–0	Tottenham Hotspur	Manchester
13:30 GMT	Navas 1', 90+2'; Sandro 34' (o.g.); Agüero 41', 50'; Negredo 55'	Report		Stadium: Etihad Stadium; Attendance: 47,228; Referee: Howard Webb

1 December 2013 13	Tottenham Hotspur	2–2	Manchester United	London
12:00 GMT	Walker 18'; Sandro 54'	Report	Rooney 32', 57' (pen.)	Stadium: White Hart Lane; Attendance: 35,884; Referee: Mike Dean

4 December 2013 14	Fulham	1–2	Tottenham Hotspur	London
20:00 GMT	Dejagah 57'	Report	Chiricheș 72'; Holtby 82'	Stadium: Craven Cottage; Attendance: 24,128; Referee: Mark Clattenburg

7 December 2013 15	Sunderland	1–2	Tottenham Hotspur	Sunderland
17:30 GMT	Johnson 37'	Report	Paulinho 43'; O'Shea 50' (o.g.)	Stadium: Stadium of Light; Attendance: 37,963; Referee: Lee Mason

15 December 2013 16	Tottenham Hotspur	0–5	Liverpool	London
16:00 GMT		Report	Suárez 18', 84'; Henderson 40'; Flanagan 75'; Sterling 89'	Stadium: White Hart Lane; Attendance: 36,069; Referee: Jonathan Moss

22 December 2013 17	Southampton	2–3	Tottenham Hotspur	Southampton
13:30 GMT	Lallana 13'; Lambert 59'	Report	Adebayor 25', 64'; Hooiveld 54' (o.g.)	Stadium: St Mary's Stadium; Attendance: 31,455; Referee: Chris Foy

26 December 2013 18	Tottenham Hotspur	1–1	West Bromwich Albion	London
15:00 GMT	Eriksen 36'	Report	Olsson 38'	Stadium: White Hart Lane; Attendance: 35,545; Referee: Anthony Taylor

29 December 2013 19	Tottenham Hotspur	3–0	Stoke City	London
16:00 GMT	Soldado 37' (pen.); Dembélé 65'; Lennon 69'	Report		Stadium: White Hart Lane; Attendance: 36,072; Referee: Kevin Friend

1 January 2014 20	Manchester United	1–2	Tottenham Hotspur	Manchester
17:30 GMT	Welbeck 67'	Report	Adebayor 34'; Eriksen 66'	Stadium: Old Trafford; Attendance: 75,265; Referee: Howard Webb

11 January 2014 21	Tottenham Hotspur	2–0	Crystal Palace	London
15:00 GMT	Eriksen 50'; Defoe 72'	Report		Stadium: White Hart Lane; Attendance: 36,102; Referee: Michael Oliver

19 January 2014 22	Swansea City	1–3	Tottenham Hotspur	Swansea
13:30 GMT	Bony 78'	Report	Adebayor 35', 71'; Chico 53' (o.g.)	Stadium: Liberty Stadium; Attendance: 20,769; Referee: Martin Atkinson

29 January 2014 23	Tottenham Hotspur	1–5	Manchester City	London
19:45 GMT	Capoue 59'	Report	Agüero 15'; Touré 51' (pen.); Džeko 53'; Jovetić 78'; Kompany 89'	Stadium: White Hart Lane; Attendance: 36,071; Referee: Andre Marriner

1 February 2014 24	Hull City	1–1	Tottenham Hotspur	Kingston upon Hull
15:00 GMT	Long 12'	Report	Paulinho 61'	Stadium: KC Stadium; Attendance: 24,932; Referee: Anthony Taylor

9 February 2014 25	Tottenham Hotspur	1–0	Everton	London
13:30 GMT	Adebayor 65'	Report		Stadium: White Hart Lane; Attendance: 35,944; Referee: Mark Clattenburg

12 February 2014 26	Newcastle United	0–4	Tottenham Hotspur	Newcastle upon Tyne
19:45 GMT		Report	Adebayor 19', 82'; Paulinho 53'; Chadli 88'	Stadium: St. James' Park; Attendance: 48,264; Referee: Neil Swarbrick

23 February 2014 27	Norwich City	1–0	Tottenham Hotspur	Norwich
16:00 GMT	Snodgrass 47'	Report		Stadium: Carrow Road; Attendance: 26,834; Referee: Craig Pawson

2 March 2014 28	Tottenham Hotspur	1–0	Cardiff City	London
16:30 GMT	Soldado 28'	Report		Stadium: White Hart Lane; Attendance: 35,512; Referee: Phil Dowd

8 March 2014 29	Chelsea	4–0	Tottenham Hotspur	London
17:30 GMT	Eto'o 56'; Hazard 60' (pen.); Ba 88', 89'	Report		Stadium: Stamford Bridge; Attendance: 41,598; Referee: Michael Oliver

16 March 2014 30	Tottenham Hotspur	0–1	Arsenal	London
16:00 GMT		Report	Rosický 2'	Stadium: White Hart Lane; Attendance: 35,711; Referee: Mike Dean

23 March 2014 31	Tottenham Hotspur	3–2	Southampton	London
13:30 GMT	Eriksen 31', 46'; Sigurðsson 90'	Report	Rodriguez 19'; Lallana 28'	Stadium: White Hart Lane; Attendance: 35,460; Referee: Anthony Taylor

30 March 2014 32	Liverpool	4–0	Tottenham Hotspur	Liverpool
16:00 BST	Kaboul 2' (o.g.); Suárez 25'; Coutinho 55'; Henderson 75'	Report		Stadium: Anfield; Attendance: 44,762; Referee: Phil Dowd

7 April 2014 33	Tottenham Hotspur	5–1	Sunderland	London
20:00 BST	Adebayor 28', 86'; Kane 59'; Eriksen 78'; Sigurðsson 90'	Report	Cattermole 17'	Stadium: White Hart Lane; Attendance: 34,410; Referee: Lee Mason

12 April 2014 34	West Bromwich Albion	3–3	Tottenham Hotspur	West Bromwich
15:00 BST	Vydra 1'; Brunt 4'; Sessegnon 31'	Report	Olsson 34' (o.g.); Kane 70'; Eriksen 90'	Stadium: The Hawthorns; Attendance: 25,398; Referee: Neil Swarbrick

19 April 2014 35	Tottenham Hotspur	3–1	Fulham	London
12:45 BST	Paulinho 35'; Kane 48'; Kaboul 62'	Report	Sidwell 37'	Stadium: White Hart Lane; Attendance: 35,841; Referee: Lee Probert

26 April 2014 36	Stoke City	0–1	Tottenham Hotspur	Stoke-on-Trent
15:00 BST		Report	Rose 33'	Stadium: Britannia Stadium; Attendance: 26,021; Referee: Andre Marriner

3 May 2014 37	West Ham United	2–0	Tottenham Hotspur	London
12:45 BST	Kane 27' (o.g.); Downing 44'	Report		Stadium: Boleyn Ground; Attendance: 34,977; Referee: Phil Dowd

11 May 2014 38	Tottenham Hotspur	3–0	Aston Villa	London
15:00 BST	Paulinho 14'; Baker 35' (o.g.); Adebayor 38' (pen.)	Report		Stadium: White Hart Lane; Attendance: 35,826; Referee: Jonathan Moss

=== FA Cup ===
4 January 2014 Third round	Arsenal	2–0	Tottenham Hotspur	London
17:15 GMT	Cazorla 31'; Rosický 62'	Report		Stadium: Emirates Stadium; Attendance: 59,476; Referee: Mark Clattenburg

=== League Cup ===
24 September 2013 Third round	Aston Villa	0–4	Tottenham Hotspur	Birmingham
19:45 BST		Report	Defoe 45', 90'; Paulinho 49'; Chadli 86'	Stadium: Villa Park; Attendance: 22,975; Referee: Jonathan Moss

30 October 2013 Fourth round	Tottenham Hotspur	2–2 (a.e.t.) (8–7 p)	Hull City	London
19:45 GMT	Sigurðsson 15'; Kane 108'	Report	Friedel 53' (o.g.); McShane 99'	Stadium: White Hart Lane; Attendance: 35,617; Referee: Jonathan Moss
	Penalties
	Sigurðsson (penalty scored); Defoe (penalty scored); Vertonghen (penalty scored); Lamela (penalty missed); Kane (penalty scored); Paulinho (penalty scored); Kaboul (penalty scored); Dembélé (penalty scored); Walker (penalty scored)		McLean (penalty missed); Quinn (penalty scored); Boyd (penalty scored); Gedo (penalty scored); Proschwitz (penalty scored); Meyler (penalty scored); Rosenior (penalty scored); McShane (penalty scored); Elmohamady (penalty missed)

18 December 2013 Fifth round	Tottenham Hotspur	1–2	West Ham United	London
19:45 GMT	Adebayor 67'	Report	Jarvis 80'; Maïga 85'	Stadium: White Hart Lane; Attendance: 34,080; Referee: Neil Swarbrick

=== UEFA Europa League ===
==== Play-off round ====
22 August 2013 First leg	Dinamo Tbilisi (Georgia (country))	0–5	(England) Tottenham Hotspur	Tbilisi, Georgia
18:00 BST	Gvelesiani (yellow card) 21'; Khurtsilava (yellow card) 30'	Report	Townsend 12'; Dembélé (yellow card) 38'; Paulinho 44'; Soldado 58', 67'; Rose (yellow card) 60' (goal) 64'	Stadium: Dinamo Arena; Attendance: 22,500; Referee: Pol van Boekel (Netherlands)

29 August 2013 Second leg	Tottenham Hotspur (England)	3–0 (8–0 agg.)	(Georgia (country)) Dinamo Tbilisi	London, England
20:05 BST	Sandro (yellow card) 16'; Defoe 40', 45', (yellow card) 90'; Holtby 69'	Report	Merebashvilli (yellow card) 19'	Stadium: White Hart Lane; Attendance: 35,000; Referee: Luca Banti (Italy)

==== Group stage ====
Pos	Team	Pld	W	D	L	GF	GA	GD	Pts	Qualification	TOT	ANZ	SHE	TRO
1	(England) Tottenham Hotspur	6	6	0	0	15	2	+13	18	Advance to knockout phase	—	4–1	2–1	3–0
2	(Russia) Anzhi Makhachkala	6	2	2	2	4	7	−3	8	Advance to knockout phase	0–2	—	1–1	1–0
3	(Moldova) Sheriff Tiraspol	6	1	3	2	5	6	−1	6		0–2	0–0	—	2–0
4	(Norway) Tromsø	6	0	1	5	1	10	−9	1		0–2	0–1	1–1	—

Source: Soccerway

19 September 2013 1	Tottenham Hotspur (England)	3–0	(Norway) Tromsø	London, England
20:05 BST	Defoe 21', 29'; Eriksen 86'	Report	Johnsen (yellow card) 61'; Fojut (yellow card) 71'	Stadium: White Hart Lane; Attendance: 26,581; Referee: Libor Kovařík (Czech Republic)

3 October 2013 2	Anzhi Makhachkala (Russia)	0–2	(England) Tottenham Hotspur	Moscow, Russia
18:00 BST		Report	Defoe 34'; Chadli 39'	Stadium: Lokomotiv Stadium; Attendance: 5,662; Referee: Bülent Yıldırım (Turkey)

24 October 2013 3	Sheriff Tiraspol (Moldova)	0–2	(England) Tottenham Hotspur	Tiraspol, Moldova
18:00 BST	Moyal (yellow card) 60'	Report	Vertonghen 12'; Chiricheș (yellow card) 45+1'; Defoe 75'	Stadium: Sheriff Stadium; Attendance: 11,725; Referee: Liran Liany (Israel)

7 November 2013 4	Tottenham Hotspur (England)	2–1	(Moldova) Sheriff Tiraspol	London, England
20:05 GMT	Eriksen (yellow card) 52'; Lamela 60'; Defoe 67' (pen.)	Report	Isa 72'	Stadium: White Hart Lane; Attendance: 32,225; Referee: Kenn Hansen (Denmark)

28 November 2013 5	Tromsø (Norway)	0–2	(England) Tottenham Hotspur	Tromsø, Norway
18:00 GMT	Fojut (yellow card) 90'	Report	Dawson (yellow card) 51'; Capoue (yellow card) 55'; Soldado (yellow card) 56'; Čaušević 63' (o.g.); Dembélé 75'	Stadium: Alfheim Stadion; Attendance: 5,868; Referee: Yevgen Aranovsky (Ukraine)

12 December 2013 6	Tottenham Hotspur (England)	4–1	(Russia) Anzhi Makhachkala	London, England
20:05 GMT	Soldado 7', 16', 70' (pen.); Holtby (yellow card) 20', (goal) 54'; Naughton (yellow card) 88'	Report	Grigalava (yellow card) 34'; Ewerton 44'; Maksimov (yellow card) 52'	Stadium: White Hart Lane; Attendance: 23,101; Referee: Stefan Johannesson (Sweden)

==== Knockout phase ====
===== Round of 32 =====
20 February 2014 First leg	Dnipro Dnipropetrovsk (Ukraine)	1–0	(England) Tottenham Hotspur	Dnipropetrovsk, Ukraine
18:00 GMT	Konoplyanka 81' (pen.)	Report		Stadium: Dnipro-Arena; Attendance: 22,356; Referee: Antonio Mateu Lahoz (Spain)

27 February 2014 Second leg	Tottenham Hotspur (England)	3–1 (3–2 agg.)	(Ukraine) Dnipro Dnipropetrovsk	London, England
20:05 GMT	Eriksen 56'; Adebayor 65', 69'	Report	Zozulya 48'	Stadium: White Hart Lane; Attendance: 36,284; Referee: Antony Gautier (France)

===== Round of 16 =====
13 March 2014 First leg	Tottenham Hotspur (England)	1–3	(Portugal) Benfica	London, England
20:05 GMT	Sandro (yellow card) 9'; Eriksen 63'; Vertonghen (yellow card) 81'	Report	Rodrigo 29'; Luisão 58', 84'; Sílvio (yellow card) 63'; Amorim (yellow card) 81'	Stadium: White Hart Lane; Attendance: 35,000; Referee: Jonas Eriksson (Sweden)

20 March 2014 Second leg	(Portugal) Benfica	2–2 (5–3 agg.)	(England) Tottenham Hotspur	Lisbon, Portugal
18:00 GMT	Luisão (yellow card) 10'; Garay 34'; Pérez (yellow card) 90'; Lima 90+5' (pen.)	Report	Chadli 78', 79'	Stadium: Estadio da Luz; Referee: Damir Skomina

== Statistics ==
=== Appearances ===
Last updated: 20 May 2018.
Source: Tottenham Hotspur F.C.

No.	Pos.	Name	Premier League		FA Cup		League Cup		Europa League		Total	
No.	Pos.	Name	Apps	Goals	Apps	Goals	Apps	Goals	Apps	Goals	Apps	Goals
Goalkeepers
24	GK	(United States) Brad Friedel	1	0	0	0	2	0	6	0	9	0
25	GK	(France) Hugo Lloris	37	0	1	0	1	0	6	0	45	0
Defenders
2	DF	(England) Kyle Walker	26	1	1	0	3	0	4	0	34	1
3	DF	(England) Danny Rose	22	1	1	0	1	0	5+1	1	29+1	2
4	DF	(France) Younes Kaboul	11+2	1	0	0	1	0	6	0	18+2	1
5	DF	(Belgium) Jan Vertonghen	23	0	0	0	2	0	6+2	1	31+2	1
6	DF	(Romania) Vlad Chiricheș	16+1	1	1	0	2+1	0	3	0	22+2	1
16	DF	(England) Kyle Naughton	19+3	0	0	0	1	0	11	0	31+3	0
21	DF	(England) Michael Dawson	31+1	0	1	0	0+1	0	5+2	0	37+4	0
35	DF	(England) Zeki Fryers	3+4	0	0	0	1+1	0	6+1	0	10+6	0
43	DF	(England) Ryan Fredericks	0	0	0	0	0	0	0+1	0	0+1	0
51	DF	(Serbia) Miloš Veljković	0+2	0	0	0	0	0	0	0	0+2	0
Midfielders
7	MF	(England) Aaron Lennon	26+1	1	1	0	1	0	3+1	0	31+2	1
8	MF	(Brazil) Paulinho	28+2	6	0	0	2	1	3+2	1	33+4	8
11	MF	(Argentina) Erik Lamela	3+6	0	0	0	2	0	5+1	1	10+7	1
14	MF	(Germany) Lewis Holtby	6+7	1	0	0	1+1	0	4+3	2	11+11	3
15	MF	(France) Etienne Capoue	8+4	1	0	0	1	0	5	0	14+4	1
17	MF	(England) Andros Townsend	12+13	1	0	0	1	0	7	1	20+13	2
19	MF	(Belgium) Mousa Dembélé	22+6	1	1	0	2+1	0	8+1	1	33+8	2
21	MF	(Belgium) Nacer Chadli	15+9	1	0+1	0	0+3	1	4+2	3	19+15	5
22	MF	(Iceland) Gylfi Sigurðsson	14+11	5	0	0	2	1	7+1	0	23+12	6
23	MF	(Denmark) Christian Eriksen	23+2	7	1	0	1	0	4+5	3	29+7	10
28	MF	(England) Tom Carroll	0	0	0	0	0	0	1+1	0	1+1	0
30	MF	(Brazil) Sandro	10+7	1	0	0	1	0	7	0	18+7	1
39	MF	(England) Alex Pritchard	0+1	0	0	0	0	0	0	0	0+1	0
42	MF	(Algeria) Nabil Bentaleb	11+4	0	1	0	0	0	2+2	0	14+6	0
Forwards
9	FW	(Spain) Roberto Soldado	22+6	6	1	0	0	0	6+1	5	29+7	11
10	FW	(Togo) Emmanuel Adebayor	20+1	11	1	0	1	1	2	2	24+1	14
37	FW	(England) Harry Kane	6+4	3	0	0	1+1	1	1+6	0	8+11	4
41	FW	(England) Shaquile Coulthirst	0	0	0	0	0	0	0+1	0	0+1	0
Players transferred out during the season.
18	FW	(England) Jermain Defoe	3+11	1	0	0	3	2	5	7	11+11	10

=== Top scorers ===
The list is sorted by squad number when total goals are equal.

Rnk	Pos	No.	Player	Premier League	FA Cup	League Cup	Europa League	Total
1	FW	10	(Togo) Emmanuel Adebayor	11	0	1	2	14
2	FW	9	(Spain) Roberto Soldado	6	0	0	5	11
3	FW	18	(England) Jermain Defoe	1	0	2	7	10
3	MF	23	(Denmark) Christian Eriksen	7	0	0	3	10
5	MF	8	(Brazil) Paulinho	5	0	1	1	7
6	MF	22	(Iceland) Gylfi Sigurðsson	5	0	1	0	6
7	MF	21	(Belgium) Nacer Chadli	0	0	1	3	4
7	FW	37	(England) Harry Kane	3	0	1	0	4
9	MF	14	(Germany) Lewis Holtby	1	0	0	2	3
10	DF	3	(England) Danny Rose	1	0	0	1	2
10	MF	17	(England) Andros Townsend	1	0	0	1	2
10	MF	19	(Belgium) Mousa Dembélé	1	0	0	1	2
13	DF	2	(England) Kyle Walker	1	0	0	0	1
13	DF	4	(France) Younes Kaboul	1	0	0	0	1
13	DF	5	(Belgium) Jan Vertonghen	0	0	0	1	1
13	DF	6	(Romania) Vlad Chiricheș	1	0	0	0	1
13	MF	7	(England) Aaron Lennon	1	0	0	0	1
13	MF	11	(Argentina) Erik Lamela	0	0	0	1	1
13	MF	15	(France) Etienne Capoue	1	0	0	0	1
13	MF	30	(Brazil) Sandro	1	0	0	0	1
TOTALS				55	0	7	29	91

Last updated: 13 May 2018.
Source: Tottenham Hotspur F.C.

=== Clean sheets ===
The list is sorted by squad number when total clean sheets are equal.

Rnk	No.	Player	Premier League	FA Cup	League Cup	Europa League	Total
1	25	(France) Hugo Lloris	14	0	0	4	18
2	24	(United States) Brad Friedel	0	0	1	2	3
TOTALS			14	0	1	6	21

Last updated: 9 May 2018.
Source: Tottenham Hotspur F.C.
