= 2010–11 Football Conference =

Football Conference
- Season: 2010–11

The 2010–11 Football Conference season was the seventh season with the Conference consisting of three divisions and the thirty-second season overall. The Conference covers the top two levels of Non-League football in England. The Conference Premier was the fifth highest level of the overall pyramid, while the Conference North and Conference South existed at the sixth level. The top team and the winner of the play-off of the National division were promoted to Football League Two, while the bottom four were relegated to the North or South divisions. The champions of the North and South divisions were promoted to the National division, alongside the play-off winners from each division. The bottom three in each of the North and South divisions were relegated to the premier divisions of the Northern Premier League, Isthmian League or Southern League.

For sponsorship reasons, the Conference Premier was referred to as the Blue Square Bet Premier.

== Conference Premier ==
Conference Premier
- Season: 2010–11
- Champions: Crawley Town
- Promoted: Crawley Town; AFC Wimbledon
- Relegated: Altrincham; Eastbourne Borough; Histon
- Matches: 552
- Goals: 1,549 (2.81 per match)
- Top goalscorer: (England) Matt Tubbs (37)
- Biggest home win: Crawley Town 7–0 Altrincham (20 November 2010)
- Biggest away win: Eastbourne Borough 0–6 Fleetwood Town (9 April 2011); Gateshead 1–7 Newport County (30 April 2011)
- Highest scoring: Grimsby Town 7–2 Mansfield Town (1 January 2011); Wrexham 2–7 Gateshead (19 February 2011)
- Highest attendance: 18,195; Luton Town 0–0 AFC Wimbledon (21 May 2011)
- Lowest attendance: 180; Hayes & Yeading United 2–1 Eastbourne Borough (7 December 2010)

A total of 24 teams will contest the division, including 18 sides from last season, two relegated from the Football League Two, two promoted from the Conference North and two promoted from the Conference South.

=== Promotion and relegation ===
Teams promoted from 2009–10 Conference North

- Southport
- Fleetwood Town

Teams promoted from 2009–10 Conference South

- Newport County
- Bath City

Teams relegated from 2009–10 League Two

- Darlington
- Grimsby Town

=== League table ===
Pos	Team	Pld	W	D	L	GF	GA	GD	Pts	Promotion, qualification or relegation
1	Crawley Town (C, P)	46	31	12	3	93	30	+63	105	Promotion to Football League Two
2	AFC Wimbledon (O, P)	46	27	9	10	83	47	+36	90	Qualification for the Conference Premier play-offs
3	Luton Town	46	23	15	8	85	37	+48	84	Qualification for the Conference Premier play-offs
4	Wrexham	46	22	15	9	66	49	+17	81	Qualification for the Conference Premier play-offs
5	Fleetwood Town	46	22	12	12	68	42	+26	78	Qualification for the Conference Premier play-offs
6	Kidderminster Harriers	46	20	17	9	74	60	+14	72 (Note: Kidderminster Harriers and Histon were docked five points for submitting misleading financial information.)	
7	Darlington	46	18	17	11	61	42	+19	71	
8	York City	46	19	14	13	55	50	+5	71	
9	Newport County	46	18	15	13	78	60	+18	69	
10	Bath City	46	16	15	15	64	68	−4	63	
11	Grimsby Town	46	15	17	14	72	62	+10	62	
12	Mansfield Town	46	17	10	19	73	75	−2	61	
13	Rushden & Diamonds	46	16	14	16	65	62	+3	57 (Note: Rushden & Diamonds were docked five points for submitting misleading financial information and subsequently expelled from the Football Conference on 11 June 2011.)	Club folded
14	Gateshead	46	14	15	17	65	68	−3	57	
15	Kettering Town	46	15	13	18	64	75	−11	56 (Note: Kettering Town were docked two points for fielding an ineligible player.)	
16	Hayes & Yeading United	46	15	6	25	57	81	−24	51	
17	Cambridge United	46	11	17	18	53	61	−8	50	
18	Barrow	46	12	14	20	52	67	−15	50	
19	Tamworth	46	12	13	21	62	83	−21	49	
20	Forest Green Rovers	46	10	16	20	53	72	−19	46	
21	Southport (Note: Southport were reprieved from relegation.)	46	11	13	22	56	77	−21	46	
22	Altrincham (R)	46	11	11	24	47	87	−40	44	Relegation to Conference North
23	Eastbourne Borough (R)	46	10	9	27	62	104	−42	39	Relegation to Conference South
24	Histon (R)	46	8	9	29	41	90	−49	28	Relegation to Conference North

Source: Football Conference
Rules for classification: 1) points; 2) goal difference; 3) number of goals scored.
(C) Champions; (O) Play-off winners; (P) Promoted; (R) Relegated

=== Play-offs ===
Semifinals
2	AFC Wimbledon	2	6	8
5	Fleetwood Town	0	1	1
3	Luton Town	3	2	5
4	Wrexham	0	1	1

Final
2	AFC Wimbledon (p)	0 (4)
3	Luton Town	0 (3)

==== Semifinals ====
6 May 2011
19:45

Fleetwood Town	0–2	AFC Wimbledon
	Report	Moore 38'; Mohamed 48'

Highbury Stadium, Fleetwood
Attendance: 4,112
Referee: Nick Kinseley
11 May 2011
19:45

AFC Wimbledon	6–1	Fleetwood Town
Mohamed 1', 35', 63'; Kedwell 28'; Jolley 67'; Mulley 80'	Report	Seddon 47'

Kingsmeadow, Kingston upon Thames
Attendance: 4,538
Referee: Andy Madley

AFC Wimbledon won 8–1 on aggregate.

5 May 2011
19:45

Wrexham	0–3	Luton Town
	Report	Lawless 16'; Gnakpa 28'; Asafu-Adjaye 35'

Racecourse Ground, Wrexham
Attendance: 7,211
Referee: Stephen Martin
10 May 2011
19:45

Luton Town	2–1	Wrexham
Kroča 29'; Walker 80'	Report	Mangan 8'

Kenilworth Road, Luton
Attendance: 9,078
Referee: Carl Berry

Luton Town won 5–1 on aggregate.

==== Final ====
21 May 2011
15:00

AFC Wimbledon	0–0 (a.e.t.)	Luton Town
Penalties
Hatton (penalty scored); Moore (penalty scored); Mohamed (penalty missed); Yakubu (penalty scored); Kedwell (penalty scored)	4–3	(penalty missed) Lawless; (penalty scored) Pilkington; (penalty scored) Newton; (penalty missed) Walker; (penalty scored) Howells

City of Manchester Stadium, Manchester
Attendance: 18,195
Referee: James Adcock

=== Stadia and locations ===
Locations of the Conference Premier 2010–11 teams

Team	Stadium	Capacity
Darlington	The Darlington Arena	25,294
Wrexham	Racecourse Ground	15,550
Gateshead	Gateshead International Stadium	11,800
Luton Town	Kenilworth Road	10,226
Mansfield Town	Field Mill	10,000
Cambridge United	Abbey Stadium	9,617
Grimsby Town	Blundell Park	9,546
York City	Bootham Crescent	9,196
Bath City	Twerton Park	8,800
Hayes & Yeading United	Church Road	6,500
Rushden & Diamonds	Nene Park	6,441
Kidderminster Harriers	Aggborough	6,238
Kettering Town	Rockingham Road	6,170
Altrincham	Moss Lane	6,085
Southport	Haig Avenue	6,008
Fleetwood Town	Highbury Stadium	5,500
Forest Green Rovers	The New Lawn	5,147
Crawley Town	Broadfield Stadium	4,996
AFC Wimbledon	Kingsmeadow	4,720
Newport County	Newport Stadium	4,700
Barrow	Holker Street	4,256
Eastbourne Borough	Priory Lane	4,134
Tamworth	The Lamb Ground	4,000
Histon	Bridge Road	3,800

=== Results ===
Home \ Away	WIM	ALT	BRW	BAT	CAM	CRA	DAR	EAB	FLE	FGR	GAT	GRI	H&Y	HIS	KET	KID	LUT	MAN	NPC	R&D	SOU	TAM	WRE	YOR
AFC Wimbledon		4–1	2–0	4–0	3–0	2–1	0–2	3–0	1–0	1–1	1–0	2–1	3–1	2–0	3–2	1–2	0–0	2–1	2–2	1–0	5–0	3–0	0–1	1–0
Altrincham	0–2		2–0	0–3	2–2	0–1	2–2	3–4	1–0	2–1	1–1	2–2	4–2	0–3	3–2	1–2	0–1	0–4	1–3	2–2	1–1	2–0	0–0	0–0
Barrow	2–0	1–0		0–1	1–2	1–1	1–1	4–0	0–2	3–0	1–3	0–2	2–0	1–1	5–0	2–1	0–1	2–2	2–1	2–0	1–1	0–2	0–1	0–0
Bath City	2–2	2–2	1–1		4–0	0–2	2–2	1–1	1–1	2–4	1–0	2–1	3–1	2–1	1–1	2–0	0–0	2–0	2–2	2–1	2–1	2–0	0–2	2–2
Cambridge United	1–2	4–0	3–1	1–2		2–2	0–1	2–0	0–1	1–1	5–0	1–1	1–0	0–0	3–0	1–2	0–0	1–5	0–1	0–2	0–0	3–3	1–3	2–1
Crawley Town	3–1	7–0	3–2	2–1	3–0		1–0	3–1	1–1	1–0	2–1	0–1	5–2	5–0	2–1	2–0	1–1	2–0	2–3	4–0	1–0	3–1	3–2	1–1
Darlington	0–0	0–1	3–1	3–1	1–0	1–1		6–1	4–0	3–0	2–0	0–1	0–1	3–1	1–1	1–1	2–2	0–0	1–0	2–0	1–0	1–0	0–1	2–1
Eastbourne Borough	2–3	5–0	0–2	2–0	0–2	1–2	1–1		0–6	0–0	0–3	2–3	5–0	2–2	1–3	1–1	2–4	1–3	0–0	0–2	4–1	1–4	4–3	2–1
Fleetwood Town	1–1	3–1	1–0	2–1	2–2	1–2	1–0	0–1		2–0	0–0	3–0	1–1	1–1	4–1	1–1	0–3	3–0	1–1	1–1	2–0	2–1	1–0	2–1
Forest Green Rovers	0–0	1–0	2–3	0–0	1–1	0–3	1–1	3–4	1–0		1–1	3–3	1–0	0–1	0–2	1–1	0–1	2–1	0–0	2–2	0–0	4–0	3–0	2–1
Gateshead	0–2	2–0	3–0	1–1	2–3	0–0	2–2	3–0	0–2	1–1		0–0	1–0	2–0	0–0	2–2	1–0	1–1	1–7	2–2	1–0	3–1	0–1	0–3
Grimsby Town	2–1	0–1	1–1	2–2	1–1	0–0	0–1	2–2	1–2	1–1	2–2		1–2	2–1	2–1	3–3	2–0	7–2	2–0	1–1	1–1	2–2	2–1	0–0
Hayes & Yeading United	0–0	0–1	2–0	2–1	2–0	0–3	3–2	2–1	1–2	3–4	3–1	0–3		1–2	3–2	0–4	0–1	4–0	1–2	3–3	1–0	2–1	0–3	1–2
Histon	0–4	3–0	3–1	1–2	0–2	0–2	0–1	1–1	1–0	0–3	1–3	1–6	0–1		0–3	0–1	0–4	2–3	0–0	0–2	2–1	1–2	1–1	1–2
Kettering Town	1–2	3–3	1–1	2–1	2–2	0–0	0–0	3–0	2–1	2–1	1–4	1–2	2–1	4–3		1–1	1–3	0–2	2–0	0–1	3–1	0–1	1–1	1–1
Kidderminster Harriers	2–0	2–1	2–0	1–0	0–0	0–0	1–2	2–1	2–1	1–0	2–1	3–2	3–1	2–2	4–1		3–3	1–3	2–3	1–0	3–4	2–2	1–0	0–0
Luton Town	3–0	2–1	0–0	3–1	2–0	1–2	4–0	3–0	1–3	6–1	2–2	1–0	1–1	5–1	2–2	1–1		2–0	1–1	3–0	6–0	2–0	1–1	5–0
Mansfield Town	2–5	0–1	1–1	2–0	1–0	1–4	1–1	4–0	2–5	3–1	3–2	0–2	3–2	1–0	1–1	1–2	0–0		3–3	2–1	2–2	0–1	2–3	5–0
Newport County	3–3	2–1	5–0	1–2	1–1	0–1	2–1	3–3	1–3	3–1	2–1	2–1	2–1	2–2	1–2	3–0	1–1	1–0		1–3	2–0	1–1	1–1	4–0
Rushden & Diamonds	1–0	1–2	5–0	5–1	2–1	0–1	2–1	2–0	1–1	2–2	0–2	4–1	1–1	2–0	1–2	2–1	0–1	1–0	0–1		2–2	1–1	2–2	0–4
Southport	0–1	1–0	2–4	2–3	1–1	0–4	1–1	1–3	1–0	4–0	5–1	2–2	0–0	3–1	1–2	2–2	2–1	1–2	2–1	2–2		2–1	0–1	4–0
Tamworth	2–5	1–0	2–2	2–2	1–1	0–3	1–1	4–2	0–2	2–1	1–1	2–1	2–3	0–1	3–1	2–2	3–1	0–2	3–2	1–2	0–1		1–1	1–3
Wrexham	1–2	2–1	1–1	2–0	1–0	0–0	2–1	2–1	0–0	2–1	2–7	2–0	0–2	4–0	2–0	2–2	1–0	1–1	1–0	1–1	2–1	4–2		1–1
York City	4–1	3–0	0–0	1–1	0–0	1–1	0–0	1–0	1–0	2–1	2–1	1–0	2–0	1–0	0–1	1–2	1–0	2–1	2–1	2–0	2–0	1–2	1–1	

Updated to match(es) played on 30 April 2011. Source: Football Conference
Legend: Blue = home team win; Yellow = draw; Red = away team win.

== Conference North ==
Conference North
- Season: 2010–11
- Champions: Alfreton Town
- Promoted: Alfreton Town; AFC Telford United
- Relegated: Stafford Rangers; Redditch United
- Matches: 420
- Goals: 1,256 (2.99 per match)
- Top goalscorer: (England) Liam Hearn (30)
- Biggest home win: Alfreton Town 6–0 Harrogate Town (13 November 2010); Alfreton Town 6–0 Guiseley (5 April 2011)
- Biggest away win: Redditch United 0–9 Boston United (21 August 2010)
- Highest scoring: Redditch United 0–9 Boston United (21 August 2010); Harrogate Town 3–6 Boston United (28 August 2010); Solihull Moors 7–2 Corby Town (12 February 2011); Solihull Moors 2–7 Hinckley United (23 April 2011)
- Highest attendance: 2,508; AFC Telford United 1–1 Worcester City (2 October 2010)
- Lowest attendance: 70; Redditch United 1–3 Droylsden (15 March 2011)

A total of 22 teams contested the division, including 18 sides from last season, one transferred from the Conference South and three promoted from the lower leagues.

=== Promotion and relegation ===
Teams promoted from 2009–10 Northern Premier League Premier Division

- Guiseley
- Boston United

Teams promoted from 2009–10 Southern League Premier Division

- Nuneaton Town

Teams transferred from 2009–10 Conference South

- Worcester City

=== League table ===
Pos	Team	Pld	W	D	L	GF	GA	GD	Pts	Promotion, qualification or relegation
1	Alfreton Town (C, P)	40	29	5	6	97	33	+64	92	Promotion to Conference Premier
2	AFC Telford United (O, P)	40	23	13	4	71	29	+42	82	Qualification for the Conference North play-offs
3	Boston United	40	23	10	7	72	33	+39	79	Qualification for the Conference North play-offs
4	Eastwood Town	40	22	7	11	82	50	+32	73	(Note: In April 2011, the Football Conference ruled that Eastwood Town were ineligible for promotion or participation in the play-offs due to ground grading issues. The club's appeal was dismissed.)
5	Guiseley	40	20	13	7	56	41	+15	73	Qualification for the Conference North play-offs
6	Nuneaton Town	40	21	9	10	66	44	+22	72	Qualification for the Conference North play-offs
7	Solihull Moors	40	18	10	12	66	49	+17	64	
8	Droylsden	40	17	9	14	69	67	+2	60	
9	Blyth Spartans	40	16	10	14	61	54	+7	58	
10	Stalybridge Celtic	40	16	9	15	64	55	+9	57	
11	Workington	40	16	6	18	52	60	−8	54	
12	Harrogate Town	40	13	11	16	53	66	−13	50	
13	Corby Town	40	13	10	17	58	80	−22	49	
14	Gloucester City	40	14	5	21	49	63	−14	47	
15	Hinckley United	40	13	7	20	76	76	0	46	
16	Worcester City	40	12	10	18	49	55	−6	46	
17	Vauxhall Motors	40	12	9	19	52	71	−19	45	
18	Gainsborough Trinity	40	12	5	23	50	74	−24	41	
19	Hyde	40	10	6	24	44	73	−29	36	
20	Stafford Rangers (R)	40	8	8	24	39	78	−39	32	Relegation to the Northern Premier League Premier Division
21	Redditch United (R)	40	2	8	30	30	105	−75	9 (Note: Redditch United were docked 5 points for submitting misleading financial information.)	Relegation to the Southern League Premier Division
22	Ilkeston Town	0	0	0	0	0	0	0	0 (Note: Ilkeston Town received a compulsory winding-up order on 8 September 2010, and the club was expelled from the league on 15 September. On 16 September, their record (PL7 W1 D3 L3 GF7 GA13 Pts7) was expunged. A new club Ilkeston was placed in the Northern Premier League Division One South.)	Club expelled and folded

Source: Football Conference
Rules for classification: 1) points; 2) goal difference; 3) number of goals scored.
(C) Champions; (O) Play-off winners; (P) Promoted; (R) Relegated

=== Play-offs ===
Semifinals
2	AFC Telford United	1	2	3
6	Nuneaton Town	1	1	2
3	Boston United	0	3	3 (2)
5	Guiseley (p)	1	2	3 (3)

Final
2	AFC Telford United	3
5	Guiseley	2

==== Semifinals ====
3 May 2011
18:45

Nuneaton Town	1–1	AFC Telford United
Storer 74'		Trainer 90'

Liberty Way, Nuneaton
Attendance: 2,089
Referee: Anthony R. Tankard
8 May 2011
14:00

AFC Telford United	2–1	Nuneaton Town
Adams 16'; Newton 45' (pen.)	Report	Spencer 56'

New Bucks Head, Telford
Attendance: 3,442

AFC Telford United won 3–2 on aggregate.

3 May 2011
18:45

Guiseley	1–0	Boston United
Peyton 75'

Nethermoor Park, Guiseley
Attendance: 1,002
Referee: Andy Newell
8 May 2011
14:00

Boston United	3–2 (a.e.t.)	Guiseley
Pearson 10'; Church 79'; Davidson 113'		Rothery 60'; Stamp 108'
Penalties
Church (penalty scored); Sleath (penalty missed); Jelliman (penalty missed); Boyes (penalty missed); Dudfield (penalty scored)	2–3	(penalty scored) Walshaw; (penalty scored) Stamp; (penalty missed) Boshell; (penalty missed) Toulson; (penalty scored) Peyton

York Street, Boston
Attendance: 2,640
Referee: Matthew Walsh

Guiseley 3–3 Boston United on aggregate. Guiseley won 3–2 on penalties.

==== Final ====
15 May 2011
15:00

AFC Telford United	3–2	Guiseley
Newton 10' (pen.); Murray 79'; Trainer 90+3'		Walshaw 45' (pen.); Stamp 47'

New Bucks Head, Telford
Attendance: 5,436
Referee: Darren England

=== Stadia and locations ===
Locations of the Conference North 2010–11 teams

Team	Stadium	Capacity
Gloucester City	Whaddon Road (Groundshare)	7,066
Boston United	York Street	6,643
Stalybridge Celtic	Bower Fold	6,500
AFC Telford United	New Bucks Head	6,300
Eastwood Town	Coronation Park	5,000
Redditch United	The Valley	5,000
Worcester City	St George's Lane	4,749
Blyth Spartans	Croft Park	4,450
Nuneaton Town	Liberty Way	4,350
Hinckley United	De Montfort Park	4,329
Gainsborough Trinity	The Northolme	4,304
Hyde	Ewen Fields	4,250
Stafford Rangers	Marston Road	4,150
Alfreton Town	North Street	3,600
Ilkeston Town	New Manor Ground	3,500
Harrogate Town	Wetherby Road	3,300
Workington	Borough Park	3,101
Solihull Moors	Damson Park	3,050
Corby Town	Rockingham Triangle	3,000
Droylsden	Butcher's Arms Ground	3,000
Guiseley	Nethermoor Park	3,000
Vauxhall Motors	Rivacre Park	2,500

=== Results ===
Home \ Away	TEL	ALF	BLY	BOS	COR	DRO	EAS	GAI	GLO	GUI	HAR	HIN	HYD	ILK	NUN	RED	SOL	STA	STL	VAU	WRC	WRK
AFC Telford United		2–1	1–1	0–1	5–0	1–1	2–2	2–1	2–0	1–0	3–0	2–2	5–0		4–1	3–1	2–4	0–0	1–0	4–1	1–1	1–0
Alfreton Town	0–0		2–1	0–1	6–0	4–0	2–2	2–1	4–0	6–0	6–0	1–0	0–0		3–2	4–0	2–0	2–0	5–3	2–0	2–1	2–0
Blyth Spartans	3–0	1–4		0–0	1–1	2–4	0–0	1–3	0–2	0–0	1–0	4–0	3–0		1–0	2–0	0–1	3–2	1–2	2–2	3–0	2–1
Boston United	0–1	3–2	5–0		1–0	2–0	1–0	1–3	1–0	1–1	2–2	3–0	2–2		1–2	1–0	1–1	1–0	1–0	2–0	1–0	4–0
Corby Town	0–0	0–1	3–4	0–0		1–0	1–6	3–1	0–2	2–2	2–1	2–0	1–2		2–3	3–2	0–2	1–3	2–2	3–1	1–1	1–0
Droylsden	2–4	2–1	0–3	4–0	1–1		4–2	1–3	2–4	0–3	5–1	3–2	3–1		1–0	3–0	0–5	2–0	2–2	1–3	2–1	3–0
Eastwood Town	3–0	4–2	0–2	2–2	2–1	2–0		2–0	1–2	0–1	2–0	6–2	1–0		2–1	2–1	2–1	3–0	1–1	3–1	2–4	0–2
Gainsborough Trinity	0–5	0–3	0–2	0–3	3–1	0–3	1–3		2–0	1–3	1–3	0–1	2–1		1–2	3–0	1–1	2–2	1–3	1–1	0–2	1–1
Gloucester City	2–2	2–1	1–2	0–1	0–2	1–1	1–3	0–2		1–2	3–2	2–1	1–0		0–3	5–0	2–4	1–2	0–2	1–0	1–1	2–0
Guiseley	0–3	1–2	0–0	0–0	4–0	2–1	2–2	2–0	1–1		1–0	3–2	1–0		1–2	3–1	1–0	1–1	3–1	1–2	0–1	2–2
Harrogate Town	0–0	1–1	2–2	3–6	0–1	3–3	2–1	3–1	3–0	0–0		2–2	1–3		1–2	3–0	2–0	3–2	2–0	0–0	1–0	2–0
Hinckley United	1–1	1–3	5–1	0–1	3–3	1–1	2–3	3–1	3–0	1–2	4–0		2–0		0–3	4–0	2–2	4–0	5–2	2–3	3–1	1–2
Hyde	0–3	1–5	0–2	0–3	2–1	1–1	1–2	1–1	1–3	0–1	1–0	3–0			1–1	1–4	1–2	1–0	0–2	1–2	0–2	2–3
Ilkeston Town																						
Nuneaton Town	0–0	1–3	3–2	1–1	2–3	1–1	2–1	1–2	0–0	0–1	3–0	2–0	1–2			1–1	2–1	1–0	2–1	3–0	2–1	2–1
Redditch United	1–1	1–5	2–1	0–9	2–2	1–3	0–6	1–4	0–1	2–3	0–1	2–3	0–1		0–5		0–0	0–1	1–3	2–2	0–0	1–1
Solihull Moors	0–1	0–1	2–0	1–0	7–2	2–2	2–0	0–2	2–1	0–1	2–2	2–7	3–2		1–1	3–0		1–1	3–1	1–0	2–0	2–0
Stafford Rangers	0–2	0–1	2–1	0–4	3–5	1–5	0–2	3–1	0–2	2–2	1–1	1–3	0–5		1–2	2–1	1–0		1–3	1–0	1–1	0–2
Stalybridge Celtic	0–1	1–2	0–0	3–1	1–1	4–0	2–1	2–0	4–3	0–0	0–1	1–1	1–2		0–2	2–0	1–1	3–2		1–3	0–0	2–1
Vauxhall Motors	0–1	0–2	2–6	0–0	3–2	0–1	1–2	1–0	2–1	2–2	1–1	2–0	3–2		1–1	2–1	3–3	2–1	0–3		2–3	1–2
Worcester City	0–3	1–2	1–0	2–0	0–2	0–1	1–1	1–2	2–0	1–2	2–3	3–2	4–2		2–2	1–1	0–1	2–2	1–0	4–1		1–2
Workington	0–1	0–0	1–1	3–5	1–2	2–0	0–3	4–2	2–1	0–1	2–1	3–1	1–1		0–1	5–1	2–1	2–0	0–5	2–1	2–0	

Updated to match(es) played on 30 April 2011. Source: Football Conference
Legend: Blue = home team win; Yellow = draw; Red = away team win.

== Conference South ==
Conference South
- Season: 2010–11
- Champions: Braintree Town
- Promoted: Braintree Town; Ebbsfleet United
- Relegated: Lewes; St Albans City
- Matches: 462
- Goals: 1,296 (2.81 per match)
- Top goalscorer: (Wales) Adam Birchall (34)
- Biggest home win: Weston-super-Mare 7–0 Bromley (11 December 2010)
- Biggest away win: Thurrock 2–7 Dover Athletic (3 January 2011); Staines Town 0–5 Eastleigh (2 April 2011)
- Highest scoring: Dover Athletic 6–3 Farnborough (18 September 2010); Boreham Wood 6–3 Weston-super-Mare (7 December 2010); Thurrock 2–7 Dover Athletic (3 January 2011)
- Highest attendance: 2,781; Dartford 1–1 Ebbsfleet United (28 August 2010)
- Lowest attendance: 105; Boreham Wood 6–3 Weston-super-Mare (7 December 2010)

A total of 22 teams contested the division, including 18 previously competing sides, one relegated from the Conference Premier and three promoted from the lower leagues.

=== Promotion and relegation ===
Teams promoted from 2009–10 Isthmian League Premier Division

- Dartford
- Boreham Wood

Teams promoted from 2009–10 Southern League Premier Division

- Farnborough

Teams relegated from 2009–10 Conference Premier

- Ebbsfleet United

=== League table ===
Pos	Team	Pld	W	D	L	GF	GA	GD	Pts	Promotion, qualification or relegation
1	Braintree Town (C, P)	42	27	8	7	78	33	+45	89	Promotion to Conference Premier
2	Farnborough	42	25	7	10	83	47	+36	82	Qualification for the Conference South play-offs
3	Ebbsfleet United (O, P)	42	22	12	8	75	51	+24	78	Qualification for the Conference South play-offs
4	Chelmsford City	42	23	8	11	82	50	+32	77	Qualification for the Conference South play-offs
5	Woking	42	22	10	10	62	42	+20	76	Qualification for the Conference South play-offs
6	Welling United	42	24	8	10	81	47	+34	75 (Note: Welling United were deducted 5 points for financial irregularities.)	
7	Dover Athletic	42	22	8	12	80	51	+29	74	
8	Eastleigh	42	22	6	14	74	53	+21	72	
9	Havant & Waterlooville	42	16	10	16	56	51	+5	58	
10	Dartford	42	15	12	15	60	59	+1	57	
11	Bromley	42	15	12	15	49	61	−12	57	
12	Weston-super-Mare	42	15	8	19	56	67	−11	53	
13	Basingstoke Town	42	13	10	19	50	63	−13	49	
14	Boreham Wood	42	12	11	19	56	67	−11	47	
15	Staines Town	42	11	14	17	48	63	−15	47	
16	Bishop's Stortford	42	13	6	23	48	79	−31	45	Transferred to Conference North
17	Dorchester Town	42	10	14	18	49	59	−10	44	
18	Hampton & Richmond Borough	42	9	15	18	43	61	−18	42	
19	Maidenhead United	42	10	10	22	43	70	−27	40	
20	Thurrock	42	8	13	21	50	77	−27	37	Reprieved from relegation (Note: Thurrock were reprieved from relegation due to the expulsion of Rushden & Diamonds from the Football Conference.)
21	Lewes (R)	42	9	9	24	34	70	−36	36	Relegation to the Isthmian League Premier Division
22	St Albans City (R)	42	7	13	22	39	75	−36	24 (Note: St Albans City were deducted 10 points for financial irregularities.)	Relegation to the Southern League Premier Division

Source: Football Conference
Rules for classification: 1) points; 2) goal difference; 3) number of goals scored.
(C) Champions; (O) Play-off winners; (P) Promoted; (R) Relegated

=== Play-offs ===
Semifinals
2	Farnborough	1	1	2
5	Woking	0	1	1
3	Ebbsfleet United	4	2	6
4	Chelmsford City	1	1	2

Final
2	Farnborough	2
3	Ebbsfleet United	4

==== Semifinals ====
4 May 2011
18:45

Woking	0–1	Farnborough
		Holloway 70'

Kingfield Stadium, Woking
Attendance: 2,726
8 May 2011
14:00

Farnborough	1–1 (a.e.t.)	Woking
McDonald 111'		Hammond 44'

Rushmoor Stadium, Farnborough
Attendance: 2,137

Farnborough won 2–1 on aggregate.

3 May 2011
18:45

Chelmsford City	1–4	Ebbsfleet United
Modeste 45'		West 21', 25'; Shakes 78', 88'

Melbourne Stadium, Chelmsford
Attendance: 1,701
Referee: Colin Lymer
8 May 2011
14:00

Ebbsfleet United	2–1	Chelmsford City
West 27', 34'		Gray 63'

Stonebridge Road, Northfleet
Attendance: 1,538

Ebbsfleet United won 6–2 on aggregate.

==== Final ====
15 May 2011
15:00

Farnborough	2–4	Ebbsfleet United
McMahon 87'; Booth 89'	report	West 28', 73'; Shakes 52'; Willock 90+5'

Rushmoor Stadium, Farnborough
Attendance: 4,267
Referee: Lee Swabey

=== Stadia and locations ===
Locations of the Conference South 2010–11 teams

Team	Stadium	Capacity
Dover Athletic	Crabble Stadium	6,500
Woking	Kingfield Stadium	6,036
Basingstoke Town	The Camrose	6,000
Havant & Waterlooville	West Leigh Park	5,250
Ebbsfleet United	Stonebridge Road	5,011
Dorchester Town	Avenue Stadium	5,009
Bromley	Hayes Lane	5,000
Boreham Wood	Meadow Park	4,502
St Albans City	Clarence Park	4,500
Welling United	Park View Road	4,500
Braintree Town	Cressing Road	4,145
Dartford	Princes Park	4,100
Bishop's Stortford	Woodside Park	4,000
Farnborough	Cherrywood Road	4,000
Thurrock	Ship Lane	3,500
Weston-super-Mare	Woodspring Stadium	3,500
Chelmsford City	Melbourne Stadium	3,000
Eastleigh	Silverlake Stadium	3,000
Hampton & Richmond	Beveree Stadium	3,000
Lewes	The Dripping Pan	3,000
Maidenhead United	York Road	3,000
Staines Town	Wheatsheaf Park	3,000

=== Results ===
Home \ Away	BAS	BST	BOR	BRA	BRO	CHE	DAR	DOR	DOV	EAS	EBB	FAR	H&R	H&W	LEW	MDH	SAC	STA	THU	WEL	WSM	WOK
Basingstoke Town		0–1	1–0	0–2	4–1	2–3	2–2	1–0	3–2	1–2	1–2	1–0	4–0	0–2	1–1	3–4	0–2	4–1	2–2	1–3	2–2	1–0
Bishop's Stortford	0–2		2–0	1–2	0–1	2–2	0–1	2–1	1–4	0–1	0–3	1–4	0–2	1–5	1–0	0–0	4–0	2–1	1–0	0–4	1–1	0–4
Boreham Wood	1–0	1–2		0–2	2–4	2–0	3–1	0–0	2–3	2–1	0–1	2–4	2–2	1–0	3–0	4–2	0–3	2–2	2–2	0–1	6–3	0–0
Braintree Town	5–2	3–1	3–2		0–2	3–0	1–1	1–1	1–2	1–0	4–1	3–0	3–1	2–0	1–0	3–1	1–1	0–0	1–0	3–1	4–0	2–0
Bromley	0–1	4–3	1–1	0–3		0–3	4–1	2–1	0–2	0–2	1–1	0–0	1–2	1–0	1–1	0–2	1–1	0–1	1–0	2–1	3–2	2–2
Chelmsford City	4–0	4–1	3–1	0–0	2–0		2–0	2–0	2–2	3–0	2–3	0–1	3–1	1–2	4–0	2–0	1–1	3–1	6–1	0–2	1–0	3–0
Dartford	1–0	3–0	1–4	1–0	2–2	1–2		0–4	4–0	0–0	1–1	4–1	0–4	2–2	3–0	3–0	2–2	1–1	0–1	1–1	4–1	3–2
Dorchester Town	0–1	0–0	3–1	1–0	0–0	1–1	0–2		0–0	0–4	1–2	2–1	2–2	0–0	0–0	1–2	1–3	3–3	3–1	3–3	1–0	1–2
Dover Athletic	3–0	2–0	1–0	1–2	1–1	2–3	0–2	2–1		0–1	1–3	6–3	1–0	0–1	4–0	2–2	4–1	1–1	1–0	2–2	0–1	2–2
Eastleigh	0–1	1–2	3–0	0–2	1–0	2–1	3–0	3–0	0–2		0–3	0–3	3–0	4–2	2–1	3–0	4–2	1–4	3–1	1–4	1–1	4–1
Ebbsfleet United	3–1	0–0	2–2	0–0	1–2	1–3	2–1	3–2	0–2	2–2		0–3	1–0	2–1	1–0	1–2	4–0	1–1	2–2	4–0	3–1	1–1
Farnborough	1–1	3–2	0–1	2–1	2–2	3–1	2–1	0–0	4–1	1–2	1–2		2–0	2–0	1–0	2–2	1–0	0–0	3–2	2–2	2–0	1–2
Hampton & Richmond	2–2	0–3	0–0	0–1	1–2	3–0	1–0	2–2	3–2	2–2	2–4	0–4		0–1	1–2	1–1	0–0	0–0	0–0	0–1	0–1	1–2
Havant & Waterlooville	2–0	4–1	2–1	1–2	2–0	1–2	1–0	3–1	0–0	2–2	2–3	0–3	1–2		1–2	2–1	0–1	1–1	4–1	1–3	0–0	1–1
Lewes	0–0	1–2	2–2	2–1	0–0	0–1	1–1	0–2	0–3	1–4	0–3	1–5	1–2	2–1		1–0	3–1	0–1	2–1	1–3	1–1	0–4
Maidenhead United	1–1	2–2	1–1	0–3	0–2	1–2	2–3	1–1	0–1	1–0	1–1	0–3	0–0	0–1	0–2		2–1	2–3	1–3	0–3	1–0	0–1
St Albans City	0–0	1–4	0–1	0–0	1–1	0–2	1–2	1–4	1–5	0–1	1–2	0–2	1–1	1–1	0–0	1–0		2–0	0–2	1–0	3–4	0–1
Staines Town	1–1	3–0	0–0	4–4	0–2	2–1	2–0	1–2	1–0	0–5	0–2	1–2	1–2	0–1	1–0	1–2	2–2		1–1	1–2	2–1	1–0
Thurrock	0–3	1–3	1–3	0–3	1–2	1–1	1–1	1–1	2–7	2–1	0–0	2–4	2–2	1–1	3–1	1–2	2–2	2–1		2–1	3–0	0–1
Welling United	4–0	3–1	3–1	1–3	3–1	3–2	2–1	1–2	0–1	4–2	1–1	1–0	0–0	0–2	2–1	2–1	6–0	4–0	1–1		1–0	2–0
Weston-super-Mare	1–0	3–1	2–0	2–1	7–0	2–2	0–1	1–0	1–4	0–2	3–2	0–2	0–0	1–1	0–3	3–1	2–1	2–1	2–1	2–0		0–1
Woking	2–0	2–0	3–0	0–1	1–0	2–2	2–2	2–1	0–1	1–1	3–0	1–1	2–1	3–1	2–1	0–2	2–0	2–0	1–0	0–0	4–3	

Updated to match(es) played on 30 April 2011. Source: Football Conference
Legend: Blue = home team win; Yellow = draw; Red = away team win.
