= Jonathan Parr =

Norwegian footballer (born 1988)

Personal information
- Full name: Jonathan Parr
- Date of birth: 21 October 1988 (age 38)
- Place of birth: Oslo, Norway
- Height: 1.82 m (6 ft 0 in)
- Position: Full-back

Youth career
- Holmlia
- KFUM Oslo
- Hauger
- –2006: Lyn/NTG

Senior career*
Years	Team	Apps	(Gls)
2006	Lyn	11	(0)
2007–2011	Aalesund	110	(8)
2011–2014	Crystal Palace	92	(2)
2014–2016	Ipswich Town	40	(3)
2016–2022	Strømsgodset	113	(4)
Total		366	(17)

International career^{‡}
2006	Norway U17	7	(4)
2007	Norway U19	7	(2)
2008–2010	Norway U21	18	(0)
2010–2013	Norway	9	(0)
- * Club domestic league appearances and goals as of 18 January 2022 ‡ National team caps and goals as of 21 May 2013

Jonathan Parr (born 21 October 1988) is a Norwegian former professional footballer who played as a full-back. He made his debut for the Norway national football team in 2010.

Hailing from Oslo, Parr started his professional career with the local team Lyn, where he made his debut in Tippeligaen. He then transferred to Aalesund in 2007, where he was a part of the team that won the Norwegian Cup in both 2009 and 2011. Parr transferred to the Championship side Crystal Palace in July 2011 and was a part of the team that won promotion to the Premier League in the 2012–13 season.

Parr subsequently played for Ipswich Town before returning to Norway to play for Strømsgodset.

== Club career ==
=== Early career ===
Parr was born in Oslo where he grew up in Holmlia and played for Holmlia SK. During his youth he also played for KFUM Oslo and Hauger before he got enrolled in the NTG/Lyn-program.

Parr made his Tippeligaen debut for Lyn on 30 April 2006, in a 1–4 loss against Stabæk. He played 14 senior matches for Lyn, 11 of them in Tippeligaen. Parr was mostly used as a striker or winger at Lyn.

In March 2007 he signed a three-year contract for Aalesund. He was in the starting line-up five times, and came off the bench 14 times during his first year in Aalesund. His first league goal came in the 4–1 victory against Sandefjord on 29 July 2007. He won the Norwegian Football Cup with Aalesund in 2009. In February 2010, he extended his contract an extra year, expiring at the end of 2011.

=== Crystal Palace ===
On 16 July 2011, Aalesund agreed a fee for Parr to transfer to London-based Championship side Crystal Palace, subject to a medical. Three days later, Crystal Palace confirmed that Parr had signed a three-year deal for an undisclosed fee. on 24 January 2012, Parr missed the final penalty when Crystal Palace lost a penalty shoot-out 1–3 against Cardiff City in the semi-final of the 2011–12 League Cup. On 12 May 2012, he was voted Crystal Palace player of the year for the 2011–12 season, due to his work-ethic and his great fitness.

Parr started the 2012–13 season well, and made the left-back position his own in Dougie Freedman's team. After Freedman's acrimonious departure from Selhurst Park in October, Parr's place in the starting XI was never under threat. New manager Ian Holloway had to also deploy him in the right fullback position because of injuries. Parr's season ended in April against Ipswich Town after damaging ligaments in his ankle. Nevertheless, Crystal Palace still managed to gain promotion to the Premier League at the end of the season. The Eagles beat Watford in the promotion-playoffs finals to return to the English top tier after an eight-year absence.

When Parr returned from his ankle-injury, Dean Moxey was the preferred choice as Palace's left-back. Parr got his Premier League debut for Crystal Palace on 21 December, replacing left-back rival Dean Moxey at half time in the match against Newcastle United. Parr gave away a penalty in his first appearance in eight months. Parr then started the next eight matches for Palace under the new manager Tony Pulis, before he was injured in the FA Cup fourth-round match against Wigan Athletic on 25 January 2014. Palace lost the match 1–2.

At the end of 2013–14 season, he was released by the club.

=== Ipswich Town ===
On 7 July 2014, Parr signed for Ipswich Town on a free transfer, signing a two-year deal. He made his debut for the club on 30 August 2014, starting in a 1–1 draw with Derby County. He scored his first goal for Ipswich on 16 September 2014, netting the opening goal in a 2–0 win against Brighton & Hove Albion at Portman Road. Parr made 33 appearances during his first season at the club, scoring twice, as Ipswich finished 6th in the Championship, qualifying for the Championship play-offs as a result.

He made his first appearance of the 2015–16 season on 15 September, featuring as a second-half substitute in a 0–1 away win over Leeds United at Elland Road. He scored his first goal of the season on 24 October in a 1–1 draw away at Nottingham Forest. Parr found regular game time limited during his second season at Ipswich, making just 10 appearances in all competitions over the first half of the season, scoring once. On 13 January 2016 he moved to Strømsgodset on a permanent deal for a reported fee of around £70,000.

=== Strømsgodset ===
Parr signed a permanent deal with Strømsgodset on 13 January 2016. He signed a 3.5-year contract.

In January 2022, Parr announced his retirement from professional football.

Eidsvold Turn

Parr signed for Eidsvold Turn 14 April 2023 doing a surprisingly comeback.

== International career ==
Parr played 14 games on national youth teams for Norway up to U-19, and was a regular at the Norway national under-21 football team with 18 matches between 2008 and 2010. On 11 May 2010, he got selected for the senior national team for the first time, as Norway were facing Montenegro and Ukraine.

Parr debuted on the Norway national team on 29 May 2010, in a friendly match against Montenegro, and he became Aalesund's first player to have started a Norway national game. As of February 2013, Parr has been capped nine times.

== Career statistics ==
=== Club ===
As of match played 27 November 2021

Appearances and goals by club, season and competition
Club	Season	League			National Cup		League Cup		Other		Total	
Club	Season	Division	Apps	Goals	Apps	Goals	Apps	Goals	Apps	Goals	Apps	Goals
Lyn	2006	Tippeligaen	11	0	1	0	0	0	2 (Note: Appearances in Royal League)	0	14	0
Lyn	Total		11	0	1	0	0	0	2	0	14	0
Aalesund	2007	Tippeligaen	19	1	4	1	0	0	–		23	2
Aalesund	2008	Tippeligaen	24	4	3	1	0	0	2 (Note: Appearances in Relegation play-offs)	0	29	5
Aalesund	2009	Tippeligaen	27	2	5	1	0	0	–		32	3
Aalesund	2010	Tippeligaen	25	0	1	0	0	0	2 (Note: Appearances in UEFA Europa League)	0	28	0
Aalesund	2011	Tippeligaen	15	1	3	0	0	0	4	0	22	1
Aalesund	Total		110	8	16	3	0	0	8	0	134	11
Crystal Palace	2011–12	Championship	39	2	0	0	6	0	–		45	2
Crystal Palace	2012–13	Championship	38	0	1	0	0	0	0	0	39	0
Crystal Palace	2013–14	Premier League	15	0	2	0	0	0	–		17	0
Crystal Palace	Total		92	2	3	0	6	0	0	0	101	2
Ipswich Town	2014–15	Championship	31	2	1	0	0	0	1 (Note: Appearance in Championship play-offs)	0	33	2
Ipswich Town	2015–16	Championship	9	1	0	0	1	0	–		10	1
Ipswich Town	Total		40	3	1	0	1	0	1	0	43	3
Strømsgodset	2016	Tippeligaen	25	2	4	0	0	0	2	0	31	2
Strømsgodset	2017	Eliteserien	28	1	2	0	0	0	–		30	1
Strømsgodset	2018	Eliteserien	27	1	5	0	0	0	–		32	1
Strømsgodset	2019	Eliteserien	11	0	0	0	0	0	–		11	0
Strømsgodset	2020	Eliteserien	4	0	0	0	0	0	–		4	0
Strømsgodset	2021	Eliteserien	18	0	0	0	0	0	–		18	0
Strømsgodset	Total		113	4	11	0	0	0	2	0	126	4
Career total			366	17	32	3	7	0	13	0	418	20

=== International ===
As of match played 6 February 2013

Appearances and goals by national team and year
National team	Year	Apps	Goals
Norway
Norway	2010	1	0
Norway	2011	5	0
Norway	2012	2	0
Norway	2013	1	0
Total		9	0

== Honours ==
Aalesund

- Norwegian Cup: 2009, 2011

Crystal Palace

- Football League Championship Play-offs: 2013

Individual

- Crystal Palace Player of the Year: 2011–12
