= Fletcher Moss Rangers F.C. =

Fletcher Moss Rangers
- Full name: Fletcher Moss Rangers Football Club
- Founded: 1986
- Ground: Mersey Bank Playing Fields, West Didsbury, Manchester
- Coordinates: 53°25′6″N 2°15′30″W
- Chairman: Daniel Francis
- League: • South Manchester Girls League • East Manchester Junior Football League • Timperley & District Junior Football League • Manchester Grassroots Sunday Football League • Salford & Districts Football League • Manchester Youth Super League
- Website: fletchermossrangers.com
Yellow teams colours	Blue teams colours	The Academy colours

Fletcher Moss Rangers Football Club is an amateur junior football club based in Didsbury, Manchester, England, established in 1986. Former players Wes Brown, Jesse Lingard, Marcus Rashford, Demetri Mitchell, and Tyler Blackett have gone on to sign professional contracts with Manchester United and represent England, while Ravel Morrison went on to play for Jamaica, Keiren Westwood for Ireland and Tosin Adarabioyo for Chelsea F.C. Manchester writer David Scott also had a stint at Fletcher Moss before going to Bolton Wanderers.

Girls and boys at the club come from extremely deprived homes, with 75-80% of the players' families using free school meal vouchers.

The club is an FA Charter Standard Community Club.

The Club has a board of Trustees that help to organise and maintain the day to day elements of the club. Led by Chairman Daniel Francis the group is made up of:

- David Horrocks
- Amir Khan
- Scott Flitcroft
- Farhaan Ahmed
- Jessica Southworth

== History ==
Fletcher Moss Rangers was established in 1986 by two fathers, Nigel Hanson and Howard Isaacs with his brother Barry. The club began by playing on Fletcher Moss Playing Fields, but have subsequently moved to their present location at Mersey Bank Playing Fields. In 2005 they were said to have had around 800 members of all ages and sexes.

== Teams ==
The club has various playing squads both for boys and girls. In the season 2023/24, the squads were as follows:

- Under 10s Elite Lions
- Under 11s Hurricanes & Tornado’s
- Under 12s Blues, Rebels, Barca, Yellows & Rosseland
- Under 13s Yellows
- Under 14s Blues, Apollo, Raiders & Girls
- Under 15s Yellows & Colts
- Under 16s Blues & Yellows

== FA Charter Standard ==
"The kids who come to us and use the facility are not from this area, they come from all the deprived areas of Manchester...The kids pay £2 a week to train and £2 to play...We played a team last month and in the car park you had a Rolls Royce and a 'baby' Bentley. At that club, those kids are paying £150 a month. And yet, I don't know of one player who has come from those clubs and gone on to be signed by a club."

— Dave Horrocks (2016)

Fletcher Moss Rangers' badge is based on the coat of arms of Manchester, with the three stripes representing the three rivers that runs through Manchester, namely the Irwell, the Irk and the Medlock and the ship representing the Manchester Ship Canal.

The club is an FA Charter Standard Community Club,. To obtain this award the club had to be affiliated to a County FA, have at least one team in a League sanctioned by The FA, have a bank account in the club's name and provide a financial statement approved by the club's committee. In addition the club had to have a disciplinary record within The FA Respect discipline threshold, operate within a set of club rules, have a club equality policy and have adopted the FA Respect Code of Conduct.

For the FA Charter Standard Community Club, the club also had to have club officials who are proud to make their environment safe, fun and inclusive for all, provide recent committee meeting minutes, have a club Safeguarding Policy, have FA Enhanced DBS (Disclosure and Barring Service) check for all club officials, have a first aider for each adult team with an in date FA Level 1 introduction to first aid in football, at least one FA Level 1 qualified coach per team with in date first aid and Safeguarding Children certificate, have a coach:player ratio of 1:16 or less and to provide links to attract new players and opportunities to move, transition or progress players.

== Former players ==
David Horrocks, Trustee of the club, said in 2016 that he believed that 73 youngsters had signed for professional clubs, either at home or abroad. In 2020 alone, six players (Cole Umebuani, Teddy Sherwood, Jaice Dore, Rafael Smith, Dane Mullings and Ka’eo Ingram) from Fletcher Moss Rangers signed for Manchester United and one (Tolani Raheem) for Manchester City.

Below is an incomplete list of professional players to have played for Fletcher Moss Rangers:

- Kyle Bartley
- Tyler Blackett
- Cameron Borthwick-Jackson
- Reece Brown
- Wes Brown
- Lewis Chalmers
- Andy Crompton
- Zeki Fryers
- Shaun Hobson
- Jordy Hiwula
- Jesse Lingard
- Emma McDougall
- Demetri Mitchell
- Ravel Morrison
- Warren Peyton
- Marcus Rashford
- Devonte Redmond
- Ashley Smith-Brown
- Cameron Stewart
- Neal Trotman
- Danny Webber
- Danny Welbeck
- Keiren Westwood
- Ro-Shaun Williams

== See also ==
- List of Fletcher Moss Rangers players
