= 2014–15 Ipswich Town F.C. season =

Ipswich Town
2014–15 season
- Chairman: Marcus Evans
- Manager: Mick McCarthy
- Stadium: Portman Road
- Championship: 6th
- FA Cup: Third round
- League Cup: First round
- Play-offs: Semi-finals
- Top goalscorer: League: Daryl Murphy (27); All: Daryl Murphy (27)
- Highest home attendance: 29,166 (vs Norwich City, 9 May 2015, Championship Play-offs)
- Lowest home attendance: 15,726 (vs Brighton & Hove Albion, 16 September 2014, Championship)
- Average home league attendance: 20,002
Home colours	Away colours

The 2014–15 season was Ipswich Town's thirteenth consecutive season in The Football League Championship, the second-highest division in the English football league system. In addition to competing in The Championship, Ipswich Town competed in the League Cup and the FA Cup.

== First-team squad ==
Note: Flags indicate national team as defined under FIFA eligibility rules; some limited exceptions apply. Players may hold more than one non-FIFA nationality.

No.	Pos.	Nation	Player
1	GK	ENG	Dean Gerken
2	DF	NOR	Jonathan Parr
3	DF	ENG	Tyrone Mings
4	DF	ENG	Luke Chambers (Captain)
5	DF	NZL	Tommy Smith
6	DF	SCO	Christophe Berra
8	MF	ENG	Cole Skuse
9	FW	IRL	Daryl Murphy
10	FW	IRL	David McGoldrick
11	MF	ENG	Paul Anderson
12	MF	IRL	Stephen Hunt
13	DF	ENG	Zeki Fryers (on loan from Crystal Palace)
14	MF	ENG	Richard Chaplow (on loan from Millwall)
15	FW	ENG	Luke Varney (on loan from Blackburn Rovers)
16	FW	IRL	Noel Hunt

No.	Pos.	Nation	Player
17	MF	MRI	Kévin Bru
18	MF	IRL	Jay Tabb
19	MF	ENG	Luke Hyam
20	FW	ENG	Freddie Sears
21	DF	WAL	Elliott Hewitt
23	MF	ENG	Alex Henshall
24	DF	IRL	Sean St Ledger
27	MF	ENG	Teddy Bishop
29	MF	ENG	Darren Ambrose
31	MF	WAL	Jack Collison
32	FW	IRL	Conor Sammon (on loan from Derby County)
33	GK	POL	Bartosz Białkowski
35	GK	IRL	Paddy Kenny
39	FW	NZL	Chris Wood (on loan from Leicester City)
50	MF	WAL	Jonny Williams (on loan from Crystal Palace))

=== Left club during season ===
Note: Flags indicate national team as defined under FIFA eligibility rules; some limited exceptions apply. Players may hold more than one non-FIFA nationality.

No.	Pos.	Nation	Player
7	MF	ENG	Cameron Stewart (on loan at Barnsley)
14	FW	HUN	Bálint Bajner (to Notts County)
20	DF	SUI	Frédéric Veseli (to Port Vale)
22	MF	ENG	Anthony Wordsworth (on loan at Crawley Town)

No.	Pos.	Nation	Player
25	FW	ENG	Paul Taylor (on loan at Blackburn Rovers)
34	FW	ENG	Jack Marriott (on loan at Colchester United)
35	FW	ENG	Frank Nouble (to Coventry City)

=== Under-23 squad ===
Note: Flags indicate national team as defined under FIFA eligibility rules; some limited exceptions apply. Players may hold more than one non-FIFA nationality.

No.	Pos.	Nation	Player
25	FW	ENG	Darren McQueen
28	DF	ENG	Matt Clarke
30	DF	ENG	Ben Wyatt
—	GK	WAL	Michael Crowe

No.	Pos.	Nation	Player
—	DF	ENG	Kyle Hammond
—	DF	ENG	Omar Sowunmi
—	MF	IRL	Dylan Connolly

== First-team coaching staff ==
Position	Name
Manager	(Republic of Ireland) Mick McCarthy
Assistant manager	(England) Terry Connor
Goalkeeping coach	(England) Malcolm Webster
Fitness Coach	(Scotland) Andy Liddell
Head physiotherapist	(England) Matt Byard
Assistant Head Physiotherapist	(England) Alex Chapman
Kitman	(England) Paul Beesley

== Pre-season ==
12 July 2014	Shelbourne	0–4	Ipswich Town	Tolka Park
15:00		Report	Anderson 12'; McQueen 30'; Mings 71'; Marriott 76'

16 July 2014	Ipswich Town	0–0	West Ham United	Portman Road
19:45		Report		Attendance: 8,976

23 July 2014	Colchester United	0–3	Ipswich Town	Colchester Community Stadium
19:30		Report	Nouble 55', 57'; Marriott 77'

26 July 2014	Gillingham	0–2	Ipswich Town	Priestfield Stadium
15:00		Report	Henshall 3'; Hyam 62'

2 August 2014	Leyton Orient	1–1	Ipswich Town	Matchroom Stadium
15:00	James 89' (pen.)	Report	Bajner 10'	Attendance: 2,052

== Competitions ==
=== Football League Championship ===
==== League table ====
Pos	Team	Pld	W	D	L	GF	GA	GD	Pts	Promotion, qualification or relegation
4	Middlesbrough	46	25	10	11	68	37	+31	85	Qualification for Championship play-offs
5	Brentford	46	23	9	14	78	59	+19	78	Qualification for Championship play-offs
6	Ipswich Town	46	22	12	12	72	54	+18	78	Qualification for Championship play-offs
7	Wolverhampton Wanderers	46	22	12	12	70	56	+14	78	
8	Derby County	46	21	14	11	85	56	+29	77	

Updated to match(es) played on 2 May 2015. Source: Sky Sports
Rules for classification: 1) Points; 2) Goal difference; 3) Number of goals scored

==== Results summary ====
Overall								Home						Away					
Pld	W	D	L	GF	GA	GD	Pts	W	D	L	GF	GA	GD	W	D	L	GF	GA	GD
46	22	12	12	72	54	+18	78	15	5	3	40	18	+22	7	7	9	32	36	−4

Last updated: 28 April 2015.
Source: Table

==== Results by round ====
Round	1	2	3	4	5	6	7	8	9	10	11	12	13	14	15	16	17	18	19	20	21	22	23	24	25	26	27	28	29	30	31	32	33	34	35	36	37	38	39	40	41	42	43	44	45	46
Ground	H	A	A	H	A	H	H	A	H	A	A	H	A	H	A	H	H	A	A	H	A	H	A	H	H	A	A	H	A	H	A	H	H	A	A	H	A	H	A	H	A	H	H	A	H	A
Result	W	L	D	L	D	W	W	W	W	D	D	D	L	D	W	W	W	D	W	W	D	W	W	W	L	W	L	D	L	W	W	L	W	L	L	D	L	W	W	D	L	W	W	D	W	L
Position	6	13	10	17	19	13	9	7	4	5	6	6	9	10	8	5	4	4	2	2	4	2	2	2	3	2	3	4	5	4	4	4	3	6	7	7	7	7	6	7	8	6	6	6	5	6

Updated to match(es) played on 28 April 2015. Source: Fixtures Table
A = Away; H = Home; W = Win; D = Draw; L = Loss

==== August ====
9 August 2014 1	Ipswich Town	2–1	Fulham	Portman Road
17:15	Murphy 32'; Hyam (yellow card) 37'; McGoldrick 61'; Mings (yellow card) 81'; Berra (yellow card) 87'	Report	Hoogland 86'	Attendance: 17,218; Referee: Steve Martin

16 August 2014 2	Reading	1–0	Ipswich Town	Madejski Stadium
15:00	Taylor 26'; Cox (yellow card) 60'; Hector (yellow card) 81'	Report	Berra (yellow card) 39'; Mings (yellow card) 60'; Smith (yellow card) 73'	Attendance: 17,198; Referee: Simon Hooper

19 August 2014 3	Birmingham City	2–2	Ipswich Town	St Andrew's
19:45	Edgar 30'; Donaldson 63'; Robinson (yellow card) 89'	Report	Berra 50', 90+4'	Attendance: 14,022; Referee: Roger East

23 August 2014 4	Ipswich Town	0–1	Norwich City	Portman Road
12:15	Skuse (yellow card) 27'; Mings (yellow card) 82'	Report	Grabban 24'; Lafferty (yellow card) 36'	Attendance: 25,245; Referee: Keith Stroud

30 August 2014 5	Derby County	1–1	Ipswich Town	Pride Park Stadium
15:00	Martin 13' (yellow card) 90+2'	Report	Berra 52'; Bru (yellow card) 71'; Tabb (yellow card) 85'; Hyam (yellow card) 90+2'	Attendance: 26,673; Referee: Eddie Ilderton

==== September ====
13 September 2014 6	Ipswich Town	2–0	Millwall	Portman Road
15:00	McGoldrick 45+2'; Murphy 63'; Berra (yellow card) 90+2'	Report		Attendance: 16,190; Referee: Carl Berry

16 September 2014 7	Ipswich Town	2–0	Brighton & Hove Albion	Portman Road
19:45	Anderson (yellow card) 33'; Skuse (yellow card) 77'; Parr 79' (yellow card) 90+3'; Murphy 89'	Report	Forster-Caskey (yellow card) 34'; LuaLua (yellow card) 61'; Greer (yellow card) 84'	Attendance: 15,726; Referee: Chris Sarginson

22 September 2014 8	Wigan Athletic	1–2	Ipswich Town	DW Stadium
19:45	Waghorn 82'	Report	Berra (yellow card) 22'; Hyam 20'; Mings (yellow card) 39'; Sammon 63'	Attendance: 12,817; Referee: Andy Woolmer

27 September 2014 9	Ipswich Town	2–0	Rotherham United	Portman Road
15:00	Murphy 3'; McGoldrick 6'	Report	Árnason (yellow card) 24'; Frecklington (yellow card) 33'	Attendance: 16,447; Referee: Lee Collins

30 September 2014 10	Sheffield Wednesday	1–1	Ipswich Town	Hillsborough Stadium
19:45	Nuhiu 5'; Maguire (yellow card) 62'; Mattock (yellow card) 90'	Report	Williams 62'	Attendance: 18,093; Referee: Darren Bond

==== October ====
5 October 2014 11	Nottingham Forest	2–2	Ipswich Town	City Ground
15:00	Lansbury (yellow card) 57'; Tesche 63'; Antonio 90+4'	Report	Murphy 19', 71'	Attendance: 24,354; Referee: James Linington

18 October 2014 12	Ipswich Town	1–1	Blackburn Rovers	Portman Road
15:00	McGoldrick 65'; Skuse (yellow card) 83'	Report	Kilgallon (yellow card) 50' (yellow-red card) 64'; Tunnicliffe (yellow card) 90+1'; Marshall 90+3'	Attendance: 16,972; Referee: James Adcock

21 October 2014 13	Cardiff City	3–1	Ipswich Town	Cardiff City Stadium
19:45	Whittingham 37'; Macheda 47' (yellow card) 74'; Fábio (yellow card) 62'; Le Fondre 69'	Report	Murphy 29'; Mings (yellow card) 56'	Attendance: 20,191; Referee: David Coote

25 October 2014 14	Ipswich Town	2–2	Huddersfield Town	Portman Road
15:00	Smith 21'; Berra 55'; Hyam (yellow card) 69'; Chambers (yellow card) 70'; Skuse (yellow card) 76'	Report	Wells 70' (pen.), 82'	Attendance: 16,751; Referee: Richard Clark

==== November ====
1 November 2014 15	Blackpool	0–2	Ipswich Town	Bloomfield Road
15:00		Report	McGoldrick 26'; Hyam (yellow card) 33'; Murphy 61'	Attendance: 10,918; Referee: Andy Haines

4 November 2014 16	Ipswich Town	2–1	Wolverhampton Wanderers	Portman Road
19:45	Hyam (yellow card) 26'; Murphy 35', 59'; Chambers (yellow card) 90+1'; Bru (yellow card) 90+4'	Report	Doherty (yellow card) 29'; Henry 53'; Clarke (yellow card) 90+5'	Attendance: 17,267; Referee: Andy Madley

8 November 2014 17	Ipswich Town	1–0	Watford	Portman Road
15:00	McGoldrick (yellow card) 43'; Smith 83'	Report	Paredes (yellow card) 33'; Ekstrand (yellow card) 58'; Munari (yellow card) 75'	Attendance: 22,490; Referee: Eddie Ilderton

22 November 2014 18	Bournemouth	2–2	Ipswich Town	Dean Court
15:00	Kermorgant 2'; Ritchie 54'	Report	Bishop 50'; Murphy 76'	Attendance: 11,115; Referee: Michael Bull

29 November 2014 19	Charlton Athletic	0–1	Ipswich Town	The Valley
12:15		Report	Hunt 90+5'	Attendance: 16,613; Referee: Darren Bond

==== December ====
6 December 2014 20	Ipswich Town	4–1	Leeds United	Portman Road
15:00	Murphy 12', 45+1'; McGoldrick 26'; Berra 48'	Report	Antenucci 4'	Attendance: 21,489; Referee: Mike Dean

13 December 2014 21	Bolton Wanderers	0–0	Ipswich Town	Macron Stadium
15:00		Report		Attendance: 15,186; Referee: Gary Sutton

20 December 2014 22	Ipswich Town	2–0	Middlesbrough	Portman Road
15:00	Murphy 25'; McGoldrick (yellow card) 38'; Tabb 45+2'	Report	Vossen (yellow card) 21'; Omeruo (yellow card) 28'; Friend (yellow card) 88'	Attendance: 21,187; Referee: James Linington

26 December 2014 23	Brentford	2–4	Ipswich Town	Griffin Park
13:00	Saunders 80', 90'	Report	Murphy 1', 21'; Anderson 30'; Smith 82'	Attendance: 12,165; Referee: Fred Graham

30 December 2014 24	Ipswich Town	3–0	Charlton Athletic	Portman Road
19:45	Smith 31'; Murphy 59'; McGoldrick 90+1'	Report		Attendance: 26,157; Referee: Chris Kavanagh

==== January ====
10 January 2015 25	Ipswich Town	0–1	Derby County	Portman Road
12:15	Smith (yellow card) 18'; McGoldrick (yellow card) 45'; Hyam (yellow card) 85'	Report	Eustace (yellow card) 39' (yellow-red card) 90+1'; Martin 57'	Attendance: 20,861; Referee: Kevin Wright

17 January 2015 26	Millwall	1–3	Ipswich Town	The Den
15:00	Gueye 43'	Report	Hunt 5', 14'; Parr 77'	Attendance: 11,063; Referee: Graham Salisbury

21 January 2015 27	Brighton & Hove Albion	3–2	Ipswich Town	Falmer Stadium
19:45	Baldock 18'; Teixeira 38', 45'	Report	Murphy 22'; Sears 78'	Attendance: 23,880; Referee: Keith Stroud

31 January 2015 28	Ipswich Town	0–0	Wigan Athletic	Portman Road
15:00	Smith (yellow card) 31'	Report	Kvist (yellow card) 35'; McClean (yellow card) 40'; Perch (yellow card) 80'	Attendance: 19,155; Referee: Charles Breakspear

==== February ====
7 February 2015 29	Rotherham United	2–0	Ipswich Town	New York Stadium
15:00	Derbyshire 38'; Sammon 64'	Report		Attendance: 10,336; Referee: Gavin Ward

10 February 2015 30	Ipswich Town	2–1	Sheffield Wednesday	Portman Road
19:45	Murphy 52'; Chambers 67'	Report	Lee 20'	Attendance: 17,306; Referee: Stuart Attwell

14 February 2015 31	Fulham	1–2	Ipswich Town	Craven Cottage
15:00	McCormack 74'	Report	Murphy 5', 45'	Attendance: 19,816; Referee: Mark Haywood

21 February 2015 32	Ipswich Town	0–1	Reading	Portman Road
15:00	Bru (yellow card) 67'	Report	Mackie 14'; Obita (yellow card) 75'	Attendance: 21,298; Referee: Eddie Ilderton

24 February 2015 33	Ipswich Town	4–2	Birmingham City	Portman Road
19:45	Mings 24'; Sears 49', 64'; Bru 90+2'	Report	Davis 57', 79' (yellow card) 63'	Attendance: 17,161; Referee: Lee Probert

==== March ====
1 March 2015 34	Norwich City	2–0	Ipswich Town	Carrow Road
14:05	Johnson 24'; Grabban 62'; Olsson (yellow card) 76'; Tettey (yellow card) 86'	Report	Skuse (yellow card) 16'; Mings (yellow card) 84'	Attendance: 27,005; Referee: Paul Tierney

4 March 2015 35	Leeds United	2–1	Ipswich Town	Elland Road
19:45	Mowatt 71'; Sharp 77'	Report	Bru (yellow card) 67'; Sears 74'; Skuse (yellow card) 88'	Attendance: 19,730; Referee: Mark Brown

7 March 2015 36	Ipswich Town	1–1	Brentford	Portman Road
15:00	Murphy 9'; Parr (yellow card) 82'	Report	Douglas 25' (yellow card) 52'; Pritchard (yellow card) 37'; Diagouraga (yellow card) 81'; Odubajo (yellow card) 84'	Attendance: 20,132; Referee: Scott Duncan

14 March 2015 37	Middlesbrough	4–1	Ipswich Town	Riverside Stadium
12:15	Ayala 4'; Adomah 30' (yellow card) 78'; Gibson (yellow card) 55'; Bamford 64', 79'; Reach (yellow card) 73'	Report	Murphy 11'; Smith (yellow card) 28'; Bishop (yellow card) 45'	Attendance: 18,909; Referee: Michael Jones

17 March 2015 38	Ipswich Town	1–0	Bolton Wanderers	Portman Road
19:45	Skuse (yellow card) 22'; Tabb 79'; Bru (yellow card) 90'	Report		Attendance: 16,923; Referee: Fred Graham

21 March 2015 39	Watford	0–1	Ipswich Town	Vicarage Road
15:00 GMT	Angella (yellow card) 37'	Report	Murphy (yellow card) 28'; Mings (yellow card) 52'; Tabb (yellow card) 90'; Chaplow 90'	Attendance: 19,038; Referee: Andy D'Urso

==== April ====
3 April 2015 40	Ipswich Town	1–1	Bournemouth	Portman Road
17:15	Sears 6'	Report	Jones 82'	Attendance: 22,672; Referee: Bobby Madley

6 April 2015 41	Huddersfield Town	2–1	Ipswich Town	John Smith's Stadium
15:00	Wells 12'; Vaughan 30'	Report	Varney 48'	Attendance: 13,231; Referee: Tony Harrington

11 April 2015 42	Ipswich Town	3–2	Blackpool	Portman Road
15:00	Sears 24', 28'; Berra 83'	Report	Orlandi 4'; Cameron 63'	Attendance: 19,290; Referee: James Linington

14 April 2015 43	Ipswich Town	3–1	Cardiff City	Portman Road
15:00	Sears 8'; Skuse 29'; Murphy 90+3'	Report	Doyle 13'	Attendance: 17,722; Referee: Gavin Ward

18 April 2015 44	Wolverhampton Wanderers	1–1	Ipswich Town	Molineux Stadium
12:15	Afobe 50'	Report	Stearman 21' (o.g.)	Attendance: 23,409; Referee: Stuart Attwell

25 April 2015 45	Ipswich Town	2–1	Nottingham Forest	Portman Road
15:00	Murphy 22'; Sears 83'	Report	Berra 53' (o.g.)	Attendance: 25,199; Referee: Graham Salisbury

==== May ====
2 May 2015 46	Blackburn Rovers	3–2	Ipswich Town	Ewood Park
12:15 GMT	Rhodes 36'; Conway 42'; Gestede 58'	Report	Murphy 2', 82'; Skuse (yellow card) 39'; Tabb (yellow card) 43'	Attendance: 16,469; Referee: Graham Scott

==== Playoffs ====
9 May 2015 SF1	Ipswich Town	1–1	Norwich City	Ipswich
12:15 GMT	Anderson 45'	Report	Howson 41'	Stadium: Portman Road; Attendance: 29,166; Referee: Anthony Taylor

16 May 2015 SF2	Norwich City	3–1	Ipswich Town	Norwich
12:15 GMT	Hoolahan 50' (pen.); Redmond 64'; Jerome 76'	Report	Berra (red card) 49'; Smith 60'	Stadium: Carrow Road; Attendance: 26,994; Referee: Roger East

=== FA Cup ===
4 January 2015 Third round	Southampton	1–1	Ipswich Town	St Mary's Stadium
15:00	Schneiderlin 33'	Report	Ambrose 19'	Attendance: 31,201; Referee: Martin Atkinson

14 January 2015 Third round replay	Ipswich Town	0–1	Southampton	Portman Road
19:55		Report	Long 19'	Attendance: 27,923; Referee: Graham Scott

=== Football League Cup ===
12 August 2014 First round	Crawley Town	1–0	Ipswich Town	Broadfield Stadium
19:45	Bradley (yellow card) 45+4'; Smith (yellow card) 76'; Edwards (yellow card) 83'; McLeod 111'	Report	Bru (yellow card) 15'; Henshall (yellow card) 18'; Clarke (yellow card) 90+1'; Hewitt (yellow card) 102'	Attendance: 3,043; Referee: Andy Haines

== Transfers ==
=== Transfers in ===
Date	Position	Nationality	Name	From	Fee	Ref.
27 June 2014	LM	(England)	Alex Henshall	(England) Manchester City	Free transfer	
30 June 2014	LM	(Republic of Ireland)	Stephen Hunt	Free agent	Free transfer	
1 July 2014	LW	(England)	Cameron Stewart	(England) Hull City	Free transfer	
7 July 2014	LB	(Norway)	Jonathan Parr	(England) Crystal Palace	Free transfer	
15 July 2014	GK	(Poland)	Bartosz Białkowski	(England) Notts County	Undisclosed	
30 July 2014	CF	(Hungary)	Bálint Bajner	(Germany) Borussia Dortmund	Free transfer	
31 July 2014	CM	(Mauritius)	Kévin Bru	(Bulgaria) Levski Sofia	Free transfer	
30 August 2014	CM	(Republic of Ireland)	Adam McDonnell	(Republic of Ireland) Shelbourne	Free transfer	
11 September 2014	LM	(England)	Darren Ambrose	(England) Birmingham City	Free transfer	
26 September 2014	CM	(Wales)	Jack Collison	(England) West Ham United	Free transfer	
27 November 2014	CB	(Republic of Ireland)	Sean St Ledger	(England) Leicester City	Free transfer	
8 January 2015	CF	(Republic of Ireland)	Noel Hunt	(England) Leeds United	Free transfer	
16 January 2015	CF	(England)	Freddie Sears	(England) Colchester United	£100,000	
20 January 2015	GK	(Republic of Ireland)	Paddy Kenny	(England) Bolton Wanderers	Free transfer	
5 February 2015	AM	(Republic of Ireland)	Dylan Connolly	(Republic of Ireland) Shelbourne	Undisclosed	

=== Loans in ===
Date from	Position	Nationality	Name	From	Date until	Ref.
15 August 2014	CF	(Republic of Ireland)	Conor Sammon	(England) Derby County	30 June 2015	
29 September 2014	AM	(Wales)	Jonny Williams	(England) Crystal Palace	31 December 2014	
27 November 2014	CF	(Republic of Ireland)	Noel Hunt	(England) Leeds United	8 January 2015	
20 February 2015	CF	(England)	Luke Varney	(England) Blackburn Rovers	30 June 2015	
20 February 2015	CM	(England)	Richard Chaplow	(England) Millwall	30 June 2015	
27 February 2015	CF	(New Zealand)	Chris Wood	(England) Leicester City	30 June 2015	
26 March 2015	AM	(Wales)	Jonny Williams	(England) Crystal Palace	30 June 2015	
26 March 2015	LB	(England)	Zeki Fryers	(England) Crystal Palace	30 June 2015	

=== Transfers out ===
Date	Position	Nationality	Name	To	Fee	Ref.
21 May 2014	RW	(Trinidad and Tobago)	Carlos Edwards	(England) Millwall	Free transfer	
5 June 2014	GK	(England)	Scott Loach	(England) Rotherham United	Free transfer	
1 July 2014	LM	(Republic of Ireland)	Mark Timlin	(Republic of Ireland) Derry City	Free transfer	
1 July 2014	RW	(England)	Tom Winter	(England) Leiston	Free transfer	
1 July 2014	CF	(England)	Sylvan Ebanks-Blake	Free agent	Released	
3 July 2014	LB	(England)	Aaron Cresswell	(England) West Ham United	Undisclosed (Note: Fee reported as £3,750,000, could potentially rise to £7,000,000 with add-ons)	
2 September 2014	CM	(England)	Byron Lawrence	(England) Colchester United	Free transfer	
1 September 2014	CF	(England)	Frank Nouble	(England) Coventry City	Free transfer	
29 December 2014	CB	(Republic of Ireland)	Sean St Ledger	Free agent	Released	
20 January 2015	CF	(Hungary)	Bálint Bajner	(England) Notts County	Free transfer	
7 January 2015	CB	(Switzerland)	Frédéric Veseli	(England) Port Vale	Free transfer	

=== Loans out ===
Date from	Position	Nationality	Name	To	Date until	Ref.
29 July 2014	CB	(Switzerland)	Frédéric Veseli	(England) Port Vale	1 January 2014	
14 August 2014	CF	(England)	Paul Taylor	(England) Rotherham United	1 January 2015	
19 August 2014	CF	(England)	Jack Marriott	(England) Carlisle United	15 September 2014	
22 August 2014	CM	(England)	Anthony Wordsworth	(England) Rotherham United	2 January 2015	
1 September 2014	CF	(England)	Frank Nouble	(England) Coventry City	4 January 2015	
16 September 2014	CM	(England)	Jack Willbye	(England) Bury Town	16 October 2014	
6 October 2014	RB	(Wales)	Elliott Hewitt	(England) Colchester United	3 November 2014	
17 October 2014	CB	(England)	Omar Sowunmi	(England) Braintree Town	17 November 2014	
8 November 2014	CF	(England)	Jack Marriott	(England) Woking	20 January 2015	
13 November 2014	RB	(Wales)	Elliott Hewitt	(England) Colchester United	11 December 2014	
9 January 2015	LM	(England)	Alex Henshall	(England) Blackpool	10 February 2015	
9 January 2015	CB	(England)	Omar Sowunmi	(England) Lowestoft Town	30 June 2015	
15 January 2015	CM	(England)	Anthony Wordsworth	(England) Crawley Town	12 April 2015	
20 January 2015	CF	(England)	Jack Marriott	(England) Colchester United	30 June 2015	
21 March 2015	LW	(England)	Cameron Stewart	(England) Barnsley	30 June 2015	
24 March 2014	GK	(Wales)	Michael Crowe	(England) Woking	30 June 2015	
26 March 2015	CF	(England)	Paul Taylor	(England) Blackburn Rovers	30 June 2015	

== Squad statistics ==
All statistics updated as of end of season

=== Appearances and goals ===
No.	Pos	Nat	Player	Total		Championship		FA Cup		League Cup		Play-offs	
No.	Pos	Nat	Player	Apps	Goals	Apps	Goals	Apps	Goals	Apps	Goals	Apps	Goals
Goalkeepers
1	GK	(England) ENG	Dean Gerken	17	0	16	0	1	0	0	0	0	0
33	GK	(Poland) POL	Bartosz Białkowski	35	0	30+1	0	1	0	1	0	2	0
35	GK	(Republic of Ireland) IRL	Paddy Kenny	0	0	0	0	0	0	0	0	0	0
Defenders
2	DF	(Norway) NOR	Jonathan Parr	34	2	25+7	2	1	0	0	0	0+1	0
3	DF	(England) ENG	Tyrone Mings	44	1	38+2	1	1+1	0	0	0	2	0
4	DF	(England) ENG	Luke Chambers	50	1	45	1	2	0	1	0	2	0
5	DF	(New Zealand) NZL	Tommy Smith	46	5	39+3	4	2	0	0	0	2	1
6	DF	(Scotland) SCO	Christophe Berra	50	6	45	6	2	0	1	0	2	0
13	DF	(England) ENG	Zeki Fryers	3	0	2+1	0	0	0	0	0	0	0
21	DF	(Wales) WAL	Elliott Hewitt	4	0	2+1	0	0	0	1	0	0	0
28	DF	(England) ENG	Matt Clarke	5	0	0+4	0	0	0	1	0	0	0
Midfielders
8	MF	(England) ENG	Cole Skuse	43	1	40	1	0+1	0	0	0	2	0
11	MF	(England) ENG	Paul Anderson	38	2	20+16	1	0	0	0	0	1+1	1
12	MF	(Republic of Ireland) IRL	Stephen Hunt	19	0	10+7	0	2	0	0	0	0	0
14	MF	(England) ENG	Richard Chaplow	6	1	3+3	1	0	0	0	0	0	0
17	MF	(Mauritius) MRI	Kévin Bru	36	1	16+15	1	2	0	1	0	2	0
18	MF	(Republic of Ireland) IRL	Jay Tabb	37	2	28+7	2	0	0	0	0	0+2	0
19	MF	(England) ENG	Luke Hyam	18	1	14+2	1	2	0	0	0	0	0
23	MF	(England) ENG	Alex Henshall	5	0	0+4	0	0	0	1	0	0	0
27	MF	(England) ENG	Teddy Bishop	36	1	23+10	1	0	0	0+1	0	2	0
29	MF	(England) ENG	Darren Ambrose	8	1	1+5	0	2	1	0	0	0	0
50	MF	(Wales) WAL	Jonny Williams	7	1	4+3	1	0	0	0	0	0	0
Forwards
9	FW	(Republic of Ireland) IRL	Daryl Murphy	48	27	43+1	27	2	0	0	0	2	0
10	FW	(Republic of Ireland) IRL	David McGoldrick	29	7	24+2	7	2	0	0	0	0+1	0
15	FW	(England) ENG	Luke Varney	11	1	5+5	1	0	0	0	0	1	0
16	FW	(Republic of Ireland) IRL	Noel Hunt	12	3	3+8	3	0	0	0	0	0+1	0
20	FW	(England) ENG	Freddie Sears	23	9	14+7	9	0	0	0	0	2	0
25	FW	(England) ENG	Darren McQueen	1	0	0	0	0	0	0+1	0	0	0
32	FW	(Republic of Ireland) IRL	Conor Sammon	20	1	8+11	1	0+1	0	0	0	0	0
39	FW	(New Zealand) NZL	Chris Wood	8	0	3+5	0	0	0	0	0	0	0
Players currently out on loan or that have left the club:
7	MF	(England) ENG	Cameron Stewart	2	0	0	0	0+2	0	0	0	0	0
14	FW	(Hungary) HUN	Bálint Bajner	7	0	1+4	0	0+1	0	0+1	0	0	0
22	MF	(England) ENG	Anthony Wordsworth	2	0	0+1	0	0	0	1	0	0	0
26	FW	(England) ENG	Paul Taylor	1	0	0	0	0	0	1	0	0	0
34	FW	(England) ENG	Jack Marriott	1	0	0	0	0	0	1	0	0	0
35	FW	(England) ENG	Frank Nouble	2	0	0+1	0	0	0	1	0	0	0

Last updated: end of season
Source: Competitions

=== Goalscorers ===
Number	Position	Nation	Name	Championship	FA Cup	League Cup	Play-offs	Total
9	FW	(Republic of Ireland)	Daryl Murphy	27	0	0	0	27
20	FW	(England)	Freddie Sears	9	0	0	0	9
10	FW	(Republic of Ireland)	David McGoldrick	7	0	0	0	7
6	DF	(Scotland)	Christophe Berra	6	0	0	0	6
5	DF	(New Zealand)	Tommy Smith	4	0	0	1	5
16	FW	(Republic of Ireland)	Noel Hunt	3	0	0	0	3
2	DF	(Norway)	Jonathan Parr	2	0	0	0	2
18	MF	(Republic of Ireland)	Jay Tabb	2	0	0	0	2
11	MF	(England)	Paul Anderson	1	0	0	1	2
19	MF	(England)	Luke Hyam	1	0	0	0	1
32	FW	(Republic of Ireland)	Conor Sammon	1	0	0	0	1
50	MF	(Wales)	Jonny Williams	1	0	0	0	1
29	MF	(England)	Darren Ambrose	0	1	0	0	1
27	MF	(England)	Teddy Bishop	1	0	0	0	1
4	DF	(England)	Luke Chambers	1	0	0	0	1
3	DF	(England)	Tyrone Mings	1	0	0	0	1
17	MF	(Mauritius)	Kévin Bru	1	0	0	0	1
14	MF	(England)	Richard Chaplow	1	0	0	0	1
15	FW	(England)	Luke Varney	1	0	0	0	1
8	MF	(England)	Cole Skuse	1	0	0	0	1
Own goal				1	0	0	0	1
Total				72	1	0	2	75

=== Assists ===
No.	Pos	Nat	Player	Championship	FA Cup	League Cup	Play-offs	Total
11	MF	(England)	Paul Anderson	7	0	0	0	7
9	FW	(Republic of Ireland)	Daryl Murphy	5	0	0	1	6
3	DF	(England)	Tyrone Mings	4	1	0	0	5
27	MF	(England)	Teddy Bishop	5	0	0	0	5
17	MF	(Mauritius)	Kévin Bru	4	0	0	0	4
18	MF	(Republic of Ireland)	Jay Tabb	4	0	0	0	4
20	FW	(England)	Freddie Sears	4	0	0	0	4
10	FW	(Republic of Ireland)	David McGoldrick	3	0	0	0	3
4	DF	(England)	Luke Chambers	2	0	0	0	2
6	DF	(Scotland)	Christophe Berra	2	0	0	0	2
8	MF	(England)	Cole Skuse	2	0	0	0	2
19	MF	(England)	Luke Hyam	2	0	0	0	2
2	DF	(Norway)	Jonathan Parr	1	0	0	0	1
5	DF	(New Zealand)	Tommy Smith	1	0	0	0	1
12	FW	(Republic of Ireland)	Stephen Hunt	1	0	0	0	1
16	FW	(Republic of Ireland)	Noel Hunt	1	0	0	0	1
Total				48	1	0	1	50

=== Clean sheets ===
No.	Nat	Player	Championship	FA Cup	League Cup	Play-offs	Total
33	(Poland)	Bartosz Białkowski	9	0	0	0	9
1	(England)	Dean Gerken	3	0	0	0	3
Total			12	0	0	0	12

=== Disciplinary record ===
No.	Pos	Nat	Player	Championship		FA Cup		League Cup		Play-offs		Total	
No.	Pos	Nat	Player	Yellow card	Red card	Yellow card	Red card	Yellow card	Red card	Yellow card	Red card	Yellow card	Red card
2	DF	(Norway)	Jonathan Parr	3	0	0	0	0	0	0	0	3	0
3	DF	(England)	Tyrone Mings	10	0	1	0	0	0	0	0	11	0
4	DF	(England)	Luke Chambers	3	0	0	0	0	0	0	0	3	0
5	DF	(New Zealand)	Tommy Smith	7	0	0	0	0	0	0	0	7	0
6	DF	(Scotland)	Christophe Berra	8	0	1	0	0	0	0	1	9	1
8	MF	(England)	Cole Skuse	11	0	0	0	0	0	1	0	12	0
9	FW	(Republic of Ireland)	Daryl Murphy	1	0	0	0	0	0	0	0	1	0
10	FW	(Republic of Ireland)	David McGoldrick	5	0	0	0	0	0	0	0	5	0
11	MF	(England)	Paul Anderson	2	0	0	0	0	0	1	0	3	0
16	FW	(Republic of Ireland)	Noel Hunt	3	0	0	0	0	0	0	0	3	0
17	MF	(Mauritius)	Kévin Bru	7	0	0	0	1	0	0	0	8	0
18	MF	(Republic of Ireland)	Jay Tabb	5	0	0	0	0	0	0	0	5	0
19	MF	(England)	Luke Hyam	7	0	0	0	0	0	0	0	7	0
21	DF	(Wales)	Elliott Hewitt	0	0	0	0	1	0	0	0	1	0
23	MF	(England)	Alex Henshall	0	0	0	0	1	0	0	0	1	0
27	MF	(England)	Teddy Bishop	1	0	0	0	0	0	0	0	1	0
28	DF	(England)	Matthew Clarke	0	0	0	0	1	0	0	0	1	0
Total				73	0	2	0	4	0	2	1	81	1

== Awards ==
=== Player awards ===
Award	Player	Ref
Player of the Year	(Republic of Ireland) Daryl Murphy	
Players' Player of the Year	(Republic of Ireland) Daryl Murphy	
Young Player of the Year	(England) Teddy Bishop	
Goal of the Season	(England) Cole Skuse	

=== Football League Championship Manager of the Month ===
Month	Manager	Ref
September	(Republic of Ireland) Mick McCarthy	

=== Football League Championship Player of the Month ===
Month	Player	Ref
September	(England) Tyrone Mings	
December	(Republic of Ireland) Daryl Murphy	

=== PFA Championship Team of the Year ===
Player	Ref
(Republic of Ireland) Daryl Murphy	
