= Zeki Fryers =

English footballer

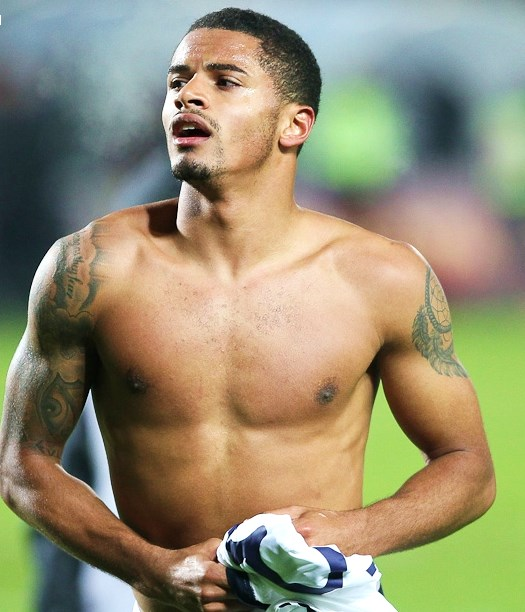
- Fryers in 2013

Personal information
- Full name: Ezekiel David Fryers
- Date of birth: 9 September 1992 (age 34)
- Place of birth: Manchester, England
- Height: 6 ft 0 in (1.83 m)
- Position: Left-back

Team information
- Current team: AFC Eskilstuna
- Number: 3

Youth career
- Fletcher Moss Rangers
- 2009–2011: Manchester United

Senior career*
Years	Team	Apps	(Gls)
2011–2012	Manchester United	2	(0)
2012–2013	Standard Liège	7	(0)
2013–2014	Tottenham Hotspur	7	(0)
2014–2017	Crystal Palace	9	(0)
2015	→ Rotherham United (loan)	10	(0)
2015	→ Ipswich Town (loan)	3	(0)
2017–2019	Barnsley	27	(1)
2019–2021	Swindon Town	32	(1)
2021–2022	Stockport County	5	(0)
2022	Welling United	1	(0)
2022	Macclesfield	3	(0)
2023–	AFC Eskilstuna	23	(0)

International career
2007–2008	England U16	5	(0)
2008–2009	England U17	7	(0)
2010	England U19	3	(0)
- * Club domestic league appearances and goals as of 15 November 2023

Ezekiel David Fryers (born 9 September 1992) is an English professional footballer who plays as a left-back for AFC Eskilstuna.

He began his career at Manchester United where he made his first team debut appearance, he left United and was bought by Belgian club Standard Liège, where he spent a year before returning to England with Tottenham Hotspur. After another season, he was sold to Crystal Palace, where he made appearances again in the first team. He spent time on loan at Rotherham United and Ipswich Town before he was released. He signed for Barnsley in 2017, but was again released at the end of the 2018–19 season and joined Swindon Town. He left Swindon after his contract expired in 2021, ultimately signing for Stockport County until the end of the 2021–22 season, but he left after four months.

Fryers is a youth international, having played for the England under-16, under-17 and under-19 teams.

== Career ==
=== Manchester United ===
Fryers began his football career at Fletcher Moss Rangers. During the 2010–11 season, Fryers suffered a serious knee injury that kept him out for most of the season. Fryers made his senior debut for Manchester United in the League Cup on 20 September 2011, starting alongside Michael Carrick in central defence in United's third round 3–0 victory over rivals Leeds United. He then played in their 3–0 fourth round win against Aldershot Town on 25 October, appearing as a left-back. On 2 November, he was a late substitute for Jonny Evans during a 2–0 win against Oțelul Galați in a Champions League group stage match at Old Trafford. He made his Premier League debut in a game against Wolverhampton Wanderers, coming on as a substitute for Patrice Evra in the 68th minute; the game finished 4–1. On 26 December 2011, Fryers continued to press for more inclusions as a 46th-minute substitute for Jonny Evans in a league match against Wigan Athletic.

In February 2012, Sky Sports carried a story suggesting that Fryers could follow fellow academy product Ravel Morrison out of Old Trafford at the end of the 2011–12 season. On 4 July 2012, Sir Alex Ferguson stated in an interview: "We haven't heard anything from Zeki Fryers, I don't know what's happening there but he's not been in touch with the club. His agent hasn't been in touch with the club and I can only assume he'll be back for training."

=== Standard Liège ===
Fryers spent the summer training with Tottenham Hotspur ahead of a proposed transfer, but the two clubs were unable to agree on a compensation package (in England, when a player under the age of 23 leaves a club at the end of his contract, his new club must pay a fee to his old club as compensation for having trained him up). Belgian club Standard Liège also expressed interest in Fryers, and as they are not an English club, they did not have to pay Manchester United the same level of compensation. Fryers signed a two-year contract with Liège on 23 August 2012. Fryers played in seven matches for Standard, but with the sacking of Ron Jans in November, he was left out of the squad and ultimately reported to his agent that he was homesick.

=== Tottenham Hotspur ===
With Fryers out of favour in Belgium, Tottenham renewed their interest in him in the January 2013 transfer window and reached an agreement with Standard Liège to sign him. The transfer was criticised by the then Manchester United manager Sir Alex Ferguson, who accused Tottenham of "blatant manipulation" of the rules, having attempted to sign Fryers directly from United in the previous transfer window. Upon signing, Fryers was made part of Tottenham's development squad. During the Asia Cup competition, in July 2013, Tottenham brought Fryers on as a substitute, where he played at left-back for the remainder of the game.

=== Crystal Palace ===
On 1 September 2014, Fryers signed a three-year deal with Crystal Palace for an undisclosed fee. The defender was released from his contract on 30 June 2017.

==== Loan moves ====
After making only one three-minute substitute appearance in the League for Crystal Palace, Fryers joined Rotherham United on a one-month loan on 16 January 2015. On 26 March 2015, Fryers signed for Ipswich Town on loan until the end of the 2014–15 season, alongside Crystal Palace teammate Jonny Williams.

=== Barnsley ===
On 1 July 2017, it was announced that Fryers had joined Championship club Barnsley on a three-year contract.

He was released by Barnsley at the end of the 2018–19 season.

=== Swindon Town ===
After his release from Barnsley, Fryers signed for Swindon Town on a two-year deal. On 14 May 2021 it was announced that he would leave Swindon at the end of the season, following the expiry of his contract.

=== Stockport County ===
After being a free agent for under four months, on 11 September, Stockport County announced that they signed Fryers on a one-year deal. Fryers left Stockport after four months with the club, having made six appearances.

=== Welling United ===
On 2 April 2022, Fryers signed for National League South side Welling United.

=== Macclesfield ===
On 19 May 2022, Fryers signed for Northern Premier League Division One West side Macclesfield, but left by mutual consent in October 2022.

In February 2023, Fryers joined Superettan side AFC Eskilstuna on a deal until the end of the season.

== Career statistics ==
As of match played 2 April 2022

Appearances and goals by club, season and competition
Club	Season	League			National Cup		League Cup		Other		Total	
Club	Season	Division	Apps	Goals	Apps	Goals	Apps	Goals	Apps	Goals	Apps	Goals
Manchester United	2011–12	Premier League	2	0	0	0	3	0	1 (Note: Appearance(s) in UEFA Champions League)	0	6	0
Standard Liège	2012–13	Belgian Pro League	7	0	0	0	—		—		7	0
Tottenham Hotspur	2012–13	Premier League	0	0	0	0	0	0	0	0	0	0
Tottenham Hotspur	2013–14	Premier League	7	0	0	0	2	0	7 (Note: Appearance(s) in UEFA Europa League)	0	16	0
Crystal Palace	2014–15	Premier League	1	0	0	0	1	0	—		2	0
Crystal Palace	2015–16	Premier League	0	0	0	0	0	0	—		0	0
Crystal Palace	2016–17	Premier League	8	0	3	0	1	0	—		12	0
Crystal Palace	Total		9	0	3	0	2	0	—		14	0
Rotherham United (loan)	2014–15	Championship	10	0	0	0	0	0	—		10	0
Ipswich Town (loan)	2014–15	Championship	3	0	0	0	0	0	—		3	0
Barnsley	2017–18	Championship	22	1	0	0	1	0	—		23	1
Barnsley	2018–19	League One	5	0	2	1	0	0	1 (Note: Appearance(s) in EFL Trophy)	0	8	1
Barnsley	Total		27	1	2	1	1	0	1	0	31	2
Swindon Town	2019–20	League Two	22	1	2	0	1	0	0	0	25	1
Swindon Town	2020–21	League One	10	0	0	0	1	0	0	0	11	0
Swindon Town	Total		32	1	2	0	2	0	0	0	36	1
Stockport County	2021–22	National League	5	0	1	0	0	0	0	0	6	0
Welling United	2021–22	National League South	1	0	—		—		0	0	1	0
Macclesfield	2022–23	Northern Premier League Division One West	0	0	0	0	0	0	0	0	0	0
Career total			103	2	8	1	10	0	9	0	130	3

== Honours ==
Swindon Town

- EFL League Two: 2019–20
