= Warren Peyton =

English footballer

Personal information
- Full name: Warren Peyton
- Date of birth: 13 December 1979 (age 46)
- Place of birth: Manchester, England
- Position: Midfielder

Team information
- Current team: Droylsden

Youth career
- Fletcher Moss Rangers

Senior career*
Years	Team	Apps	(Gls)
2000	Rochdale	1	(0)
2000–2001	Bury	1	(0)
2001–2002	Nuneaton Borough	44	(9)
2002–2003	Doncaster Rovers	6	(0)
2003–2005	Leigh RMI	67	(3)
2005–2009	Altrincham	152	(8)
2009–2010	Stalybridge Celtic	36	(6)
2010–2011	Guiseley		
2011–	Droylsden		

International career
- England C
- * Club domestic league appearances and goals as of 08:59, 16 May 2009 (UTC)

Warren Peyton (born 13 December 1979) is an English footballer who played in the Football League for Rochdale and Bury.

== Career ==
Peyton signed for Conference club Leigh RMI on a two-year deal in July 2003. He made his debut in the opening game of the 2003–04 season and played the full 90 minutes as RMI beat Dagenham & Redbridge 2–1 at Hilton Park. On 29 November, he scored his first goal for Leigh in the 2−2 draw with Forest Green Rovers at The Lawn Ground.

Peyton made his debut at Altrincham on 12 November 2005, against Exeter City. Peyton is chiefly a left-side midfielder, although he can also play at left-back.

Peyton is also an accomplished bricklayer, helping out in building turnstiles for Altrincham's stadium.

As part of cost-cutting measures, Peyton was released from Altrincham on 12 May 2009 along with Chris Lane and Joe O'Neill

Peyton then joined Conference North team Stalybridge Celtic along with former Altrincham player Joe O'Neill.

In June 2010, Peyton joined newly promoted Guiseley, again with teammate Joe O'Neill.

In August 2011, Peyton joined Conference North rivals Droylsden.
