= Darren McQueen =

English footballer

Personal information
- Full name: Darren Laurie McQueen
- Date of birth: 8 May 1995 (age 31)
- Place of birth: Leytonstone, England
- Height: 1.74 m (5 ft 8 1/2 in)
- Position: Striker

Team information
- Current team: Eastbourne Borough
- Number: 11

Youth career
- 2010–2014: Tottenham Hotspur

Senior career*
Years	Team	Apps	(Gls)
2014–2015	Ipswich Town	0	(0)
2015–2017	Maldon & Tiptree	39	(17)
2016–2017	→ Ebbsfleet United (loan)	21	(7)
2017–2018	Ebbsfleet United	38	(9)
2018–2019	Sutton United	8	(0)
2019	→ Dartford (loan)	12	(3)
2019–2020	Dartford	29	(16)
2020–2022	Dagenham & Redbridge	23	(0)
2021–2022	→ Dulwich Hamlet (loan)	33	(8)
2022–2024	Ebbsfleet United	67	(10)
2024–2026	Hornchurch	78	(17)
2026–	Eastbourne Borough	16	(1)

International career^{‡}
2017	England C	2	(2)
- * Club domestic league appearances and goals as of 23:10, 21 November 2026 (UTC) ‡ National team caps and goals as of 19:55, 31 May 2017 (UTC)

Darren Laurie McQueen (born 8 May 1995) is a footballer who plays for Eastbourne Borough. He made his professional debut for Ipswich Town on 12 August 2014 in a Football League Cup match against Crawley Town.

== Club career ==
He signed for Maldon & Tiptree of the Isthmian League Division One North on 28 July 2015. On 26 July 2016, McQueen signed on a season-loan for Ebbsfleet United.

On 1 February 2017, McQueen signed a permanent deal to stay at Ebbsfleet United.

On 14 June 2019, McQueen joined Dartford.

On 18 August 2020, he joined National League side Dagenham & Redbridge on a free transfer, having previously worked under manager Daryl McMahon at Ebbsfleet.

On 13 August 2021, McQueen joined National League South side Dulwich Hamlet on a season-long loan deal.

On 1 June 2022, Dagenham & Redbridge announced that McQueen would leave the club following the expiration of his contract.

On 27 June 2022, McQueen rejoined Ebbsfleet United.

In June 2024, McQueen joined newly promoted National League South side Hornchurch.

On 13 June 2026, McQueen joined Eastbourne Borough.

== Career statistics ==
As of match played 21 November 2026

Appearances and goals by club, season and competition
Club	Season	League			FA Cup		League Cup		Other		Total	
Club	Season	Division	Apps	Goals	Apps	Goals	Apps	Goals	Apps	Goals	Apps	Goals
Ipswich Town	2014–15	Championship	0	0	0	0	1	0	—		1	0
Maldon & Tiptree	2015–16	IL Premier Division	39	17	1	0	—		1 (Note: Appearance(s) in the FA Trophy)	0	41	17
Ebbsfleet United	2016–17	National League South	35	13	3	5	—		6 (Note: Four appearances in the FA Trophy, two appearances and two goals in the National League South play-offs)	2	44	20
Ebbsfleet United	2017–18	National League	13	2	0	0	—		0	0	13	2
Ebbsfleet United	2018–19	National League	11	1	3	1	—		—		14	2
Ebbsfleet United	Total		59	16	6	6	—		6	2	71	24
Sutton United	2018–19	National League	8	0	0	0	—		2	0	10	0
Dartford (loan)	2018–19	National League South	12	3	—		—		—		12	3
Dartford	2019–20	National League South	29	16	2	2	—		5 (Note: Two appearances in the FA Trophy, three appearances and two goals in the National League South play-offs)	2	36	20
Dartford	Total		41	19	2	2	—		5	2	48	23
Dagenham & Redbridge	2020–21	National League	23	0	2	0	—		2	2	27	2
Dagenham & Redbridge	2021–22	National League	0	0	0	0	—		0	0	0	0
Dagenham & Redbridge	Total		23	0	2	0	—		2	2	27	2
Dulwich Hamlet (loan)	2021–22	National League South	33	8	1	0	—		3	0	37	8
Ebbsfleet United	2022–23	National League South	33	6	4	0	—		2 (Note: One appearance in FA Trophy, one appearance and one goal in the Kent Senior Cup)	1	39	7
Ebbsfleet United	2023–24	National League	34	4	2	0	—		1	0	37	4
Ebbsfleet United	Total		67	10	6	0	—		3	1	76	11
Hornchurch	2024–25	National League South	42	13	3	0	—		6 (Note: One appearance in FA Trophy, five appearances and three goals in the Essex Senior Cup)	3	51	16
Hornchurch	2025–26	National League South	36	4	1	0	—		8 (Note: Three appearances in FA Trophy, three appearance and five goals in Essex Senior Cup, two appearances in National League South play-offs)	5	45	9
Hornchurch	Total		78	17	4	0	—		14	8	96	25
Eastbourne Borough	2026–27	IL Premier Division	16	1	4	3	—		3	0	23	4
Career total			364	88	26	11	1	0	39	15	430	114

== Honours ==
Ebbsfleet United

- National League South: 2022–23

Hornchurch

- National League South play-offs: 2026
