= Bayan (given name) =

Bayan is a given name. Notable people with the name include:

- Bayan I (died 602), khagan of the Avar Khaganate 562–602
- Bayan II (died 617), khagan of the Avar Khaganate 602–617
- Bayan (son of Kubrat), or Batbayan, ruler of the Khazarian Bulgars 667–690
- Bayan of the Baarin (1236–1295), Mongol general of the Yuan Dynasty
- Bayan of the Merkit (died 1340), Mongol general of the Mergid clan and official in the Yuan Dynasty
- Bayan (khan) (r. 1302–1309), a khan of White Horde
- Bayan ibn Sam'an al-Tamimi, founder of 8th-century Bayaniyya sect of Shi'a Islam
- Bayan Aman (born 2005), Saint Lucian footballer
- Bayan Fenwick (born 1993), English footballer
- Bayan Jumah (born 1994), Syrian swimmer
- Bayan Khatib (born 1979), founder of the Syrian Canadian Foundation
- Bayan Khutugh or Bayan Qudu (1324–1365), empress consort of the Yuan dynasty
- Bayan Lewis (born 1942), American police chief
- Bayan Mahmoud Al-Zahran (fl. from 2013), Saudi female lawyer
- Bayan Mahmud (born 1994), Ghanaian footballer
- Bayan Northcott (1940–2022), English music critic and composer
- Bayan Nouri (born 1960), Kurdish Iraqi politician
- Bayan Nuwayhed (1937–2025), Palestinian journalist, academic and politician
- Bayan Qulï (died 1358), puppet khan of the Chagatai Khanate 1348–1358
- Bayan Sadagah (born 1994), Saudi footballer
- Bayan Sirrullah (died 1521), second Sultan of Ternate in Maluku
- Bayan Tal (born 1962), Jordanian media specialist
- Bayan Yessentayeva (born 1974), Kazakhstani producer, TV presenter, actress, and singer
