= Abdullah Tal =

Jordanian military commander (1918–1973)

Abdullah El Tell عبدالله التل
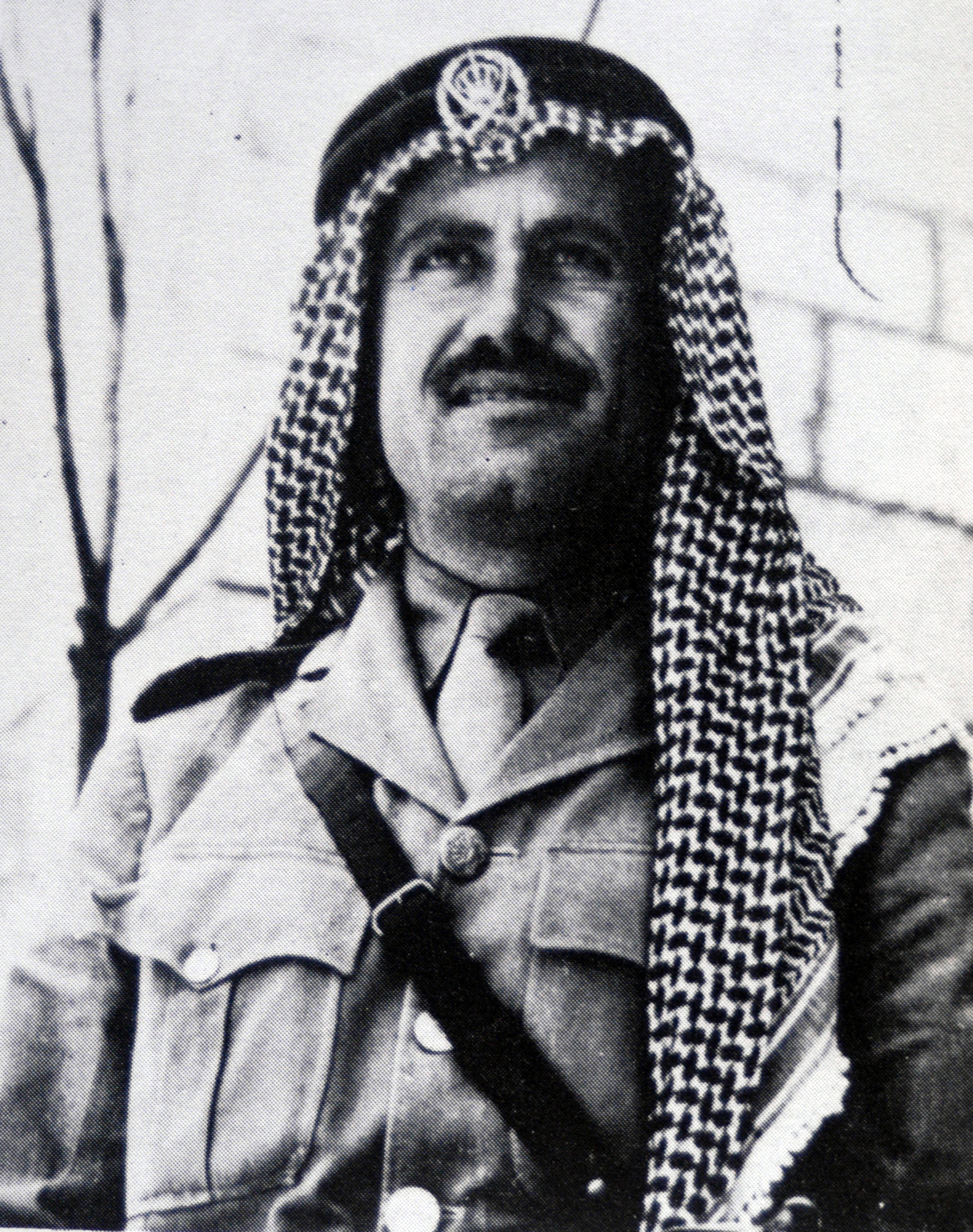
- Abdullah El Tell
- Born: 17 July 1918; Irbid, Ottoman Empire
- Died: 1973 (aged 54–55) Irbid, Jordan
- Allegiance: (United Kingdom) British Empire (1941–1946); Jordan (1946–1951)
- Branch: British Army; Arab Legion
- Service years: 1941–1950
- Rank: Lieutenant Colonel
- Commands: Sixth Regiment of Arab Legion; Military Governor of Jerusalem
- Conflicts: Second World War; First Arab-Israeli War; Battle of Jerusalem (1948); Battle of Gush Etzion
- Other work: Author

Abdullah El Tell (Arabic: عبدالله التل, 17 July 1918 – 1973; his surname is also rendered Tal) was a Jordanian military officer. He served as the commander of the 6th regiment of Jordan's Arab Legion during the 1948 Arab-Israeli War, and was one of the main Jordanian military leaders in the Battle for Jerusalem as well as the West Bank front of the war.

El Tell served as the military governor of the Old City of Jerusalem, a position he was appointed in during the 1948 War. He later fled into exile after he was accused of being a conspirator in the assassination of Jordan's king Abdullah I−which he vehemently denied−and spent many years in exile in Egypt before returning to Jordan in 1967.

== Early life and career ==
El Tell was born into a wealthy family in Irbid just as the Ottoman army were retreating from the town. His mother reportedly held him up to the window to witness the soldiers leaving. His secondary education was in Egypt. When he was 18 years old, he was jailed for demonstrating against the British. In 1941, he joined the British Army and in 1942 completed an officer training course in the Suez Canal area.

El Tell's ancestors, the Banu Zaydan, had lived in the Jordanian cities of Amman and Irbid from the 17th century. They adopted the surname El Tell in reference to their previous habitation near the Amman citadel, which was built on a tell (Arabic for "hill"). El Tell was born in Irbid on 17 July 1918. He received his primary education in the city, but moved to al-Salt for his high school education. It was there that he became skilled in the English language. He graduated in October 1937.

After working as a customs officer for the Transjordanian government, he joined the Arab Legion in 1942. He initially served in the 1st Brigade as a second lieutenant, becoming a first lieutenant in May 1943, and captain in September 1944. He was deployed at an Arab Legion training base in Sarafand al-Amar near al-Ramla in Palestine. He was promoted to major in March 1948.

El Tell married Asia Mismar in 1944 and they later had five sons, Muntasir, Salah al-Din, Osama, Khaled and Hamza, and one daughter, Inas. All were born after the 1948 War, when El Tell was living in exile in Cairo, Egypt, and all of his sons were named for prominent Muslim military figures or were associated with victory.

== Commander in 1948 War ==
In March 1948, El Tell was promoted to the rank of Major commanding the 6th Regiment of the Arab Legion, stationed in Jericho. In early May his regiment was involved in an attack on the three Jewish colonies at Kfar Etzion which dominated the road between Hebron and Bethlehem. His commander in-chief, Glubb Pasha, ordered him to withdraw his troops. On 12 May, however, El Tell told one of his officers in Hebron, Captain Hikmet Muhair, to radio Glubb's headquarters saying that his convoy was under fire from the Kfar Etzion. This resulted in the 6th Regiment receiving orders to attack. The Jewish positions had been holding off attacks from local irregulars but could not resist El Tell's troops who were backed with armoured cars. 127 prisoners were murdered after they had surrendered while 320 were taken to the prisoner of war camp at Mafraq.

Glubb was reported to have informed the Haganah in early May that when the Mandate ended his forces would enter the area allocated by the partition plan to the Arab state with "limited objectives". He appears to have had no wish to send troops into Jerusalem. On 17 May, El Tell received a personal phone call from King Abdullah ordering him to move his troops into the Old City of Jerusalem where the Arabs were coming under increasing pressure from Haganah forces attacking from West Jerusalem. They arrived just in time to prevent a breakthrough at the Zion Gate where Palmach troops had briefly broken through to the Jewish Quarter. El Tell took charge of the siege of the quarter, methodically attacking each Haganah stronghold, and demolishing each position once it had been captured. On 25 May, he wrote to Otto Lehner of the Red Cross saying that unless the Haganah abandoned its positions in the Hurva Synagogue, he would be forced to attack it. The Haganah commander, Moshe Russnak refused, but Russnak was coming under increasing pressure from the civilian population to surrender. On 28 May, El Tell received a delegation led by Mordechai Weingarten which accepted his terms: 1. All arms and ammunition to be surrendered. 2. All men capable of bearing arms to be taken prisoner and transferred to Transjordan. 3. All other inhabitants to be sent to New Jerusalem. 4. El Tell personally guaranteed, on behalf of King Abdullah, the safety of all those surrendering. 5. The Jewish Quarter would be occupied by Arab Legion troops.

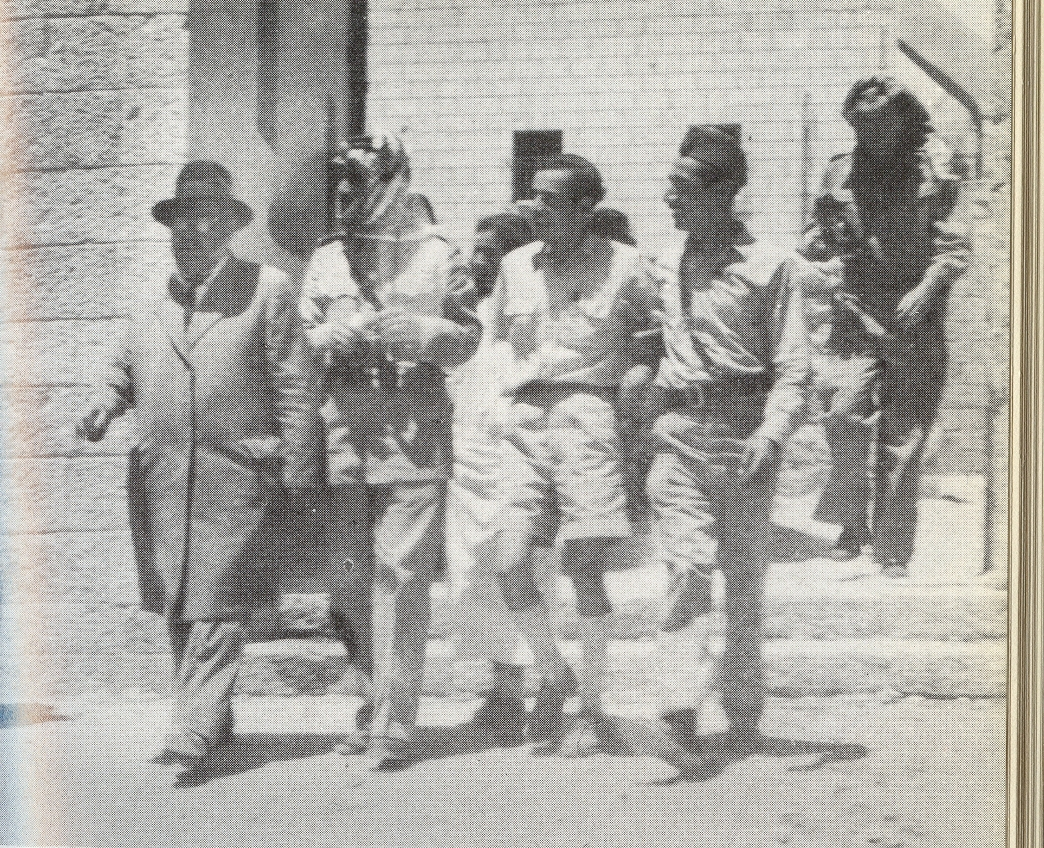
El Tell and Weingarten after the surrender of the Jewish Quarter

El Tell refused calls to take women combatants prisoners and is reported to have commented to Russnak "If I had known you were so few we would have come after you with sticks, not guns." The quarter was subjected to extensive looting after his troops withdrew. After the capture of the Jewish Quarter El Tell wanted to push on into New Jerusalem but this was blocked by Glubb, and El Tell instead launched an artillery bombardment which lasted for two weeks. He had 12 25-pounder field guns and 2 Iraqi six-inch howitzers available, but they were rationed to ten shells per gun per day.

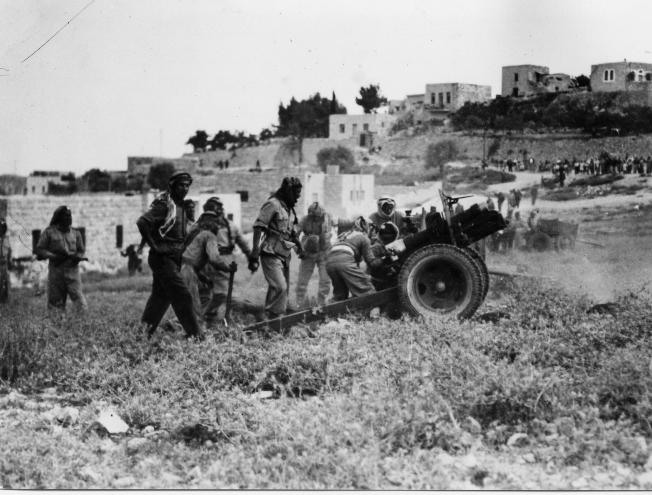
Arab Legion firing а 3.7 inch howitzer during the fighting around Jerusalem

On 11 June, King Abdullah ordered a hudna (ceasefire) and on a visit to Jerusalem on the same day promoted El Tell to Lieutenant Colonel giving him command of three infantry companies forming an improvised battalion based inside the Old City.

There followed a series of meetings in the presence of UN observers between El Tell and Colonel David Shaltiel the commander of Israeli forces in West Jerusalem.

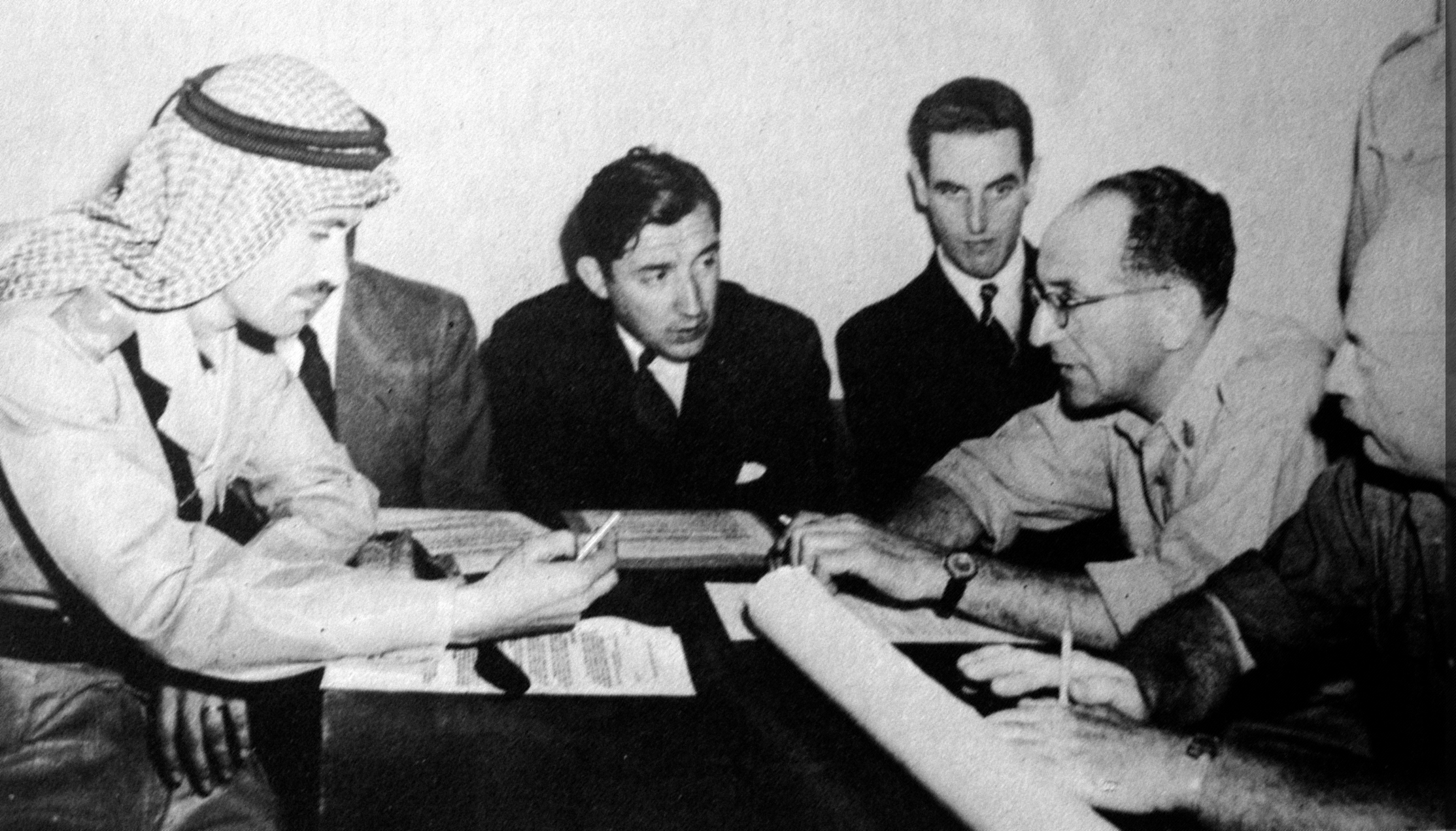
One of the meetings between Abdullah El Tell and David Shaltiel

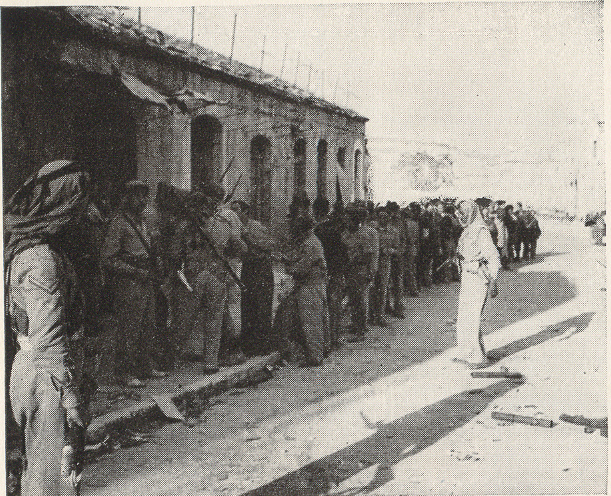
Israeli prisoners of war being taken by Arab Legion after securing Old Jerusalem to the prisoners camp in Mafraq

The first dealt with demarcation lines in the Arab district of Musrara. On 16 June they discussed Deir Abu Tor, civilian access to retrieve personal belongings, "examination by Arabs of municipal records in the Jewish area", recovery of Torah scrolls from the Old City and the closing of the New Gate. On 7 July Shaltiel signed the "Mount Scopus Agreement" by which the Israelis agreed that Mount Scopus would be demilitarized and come under United Nations supervision. Two weeks later both men signed a formal cease-fire establishing "the status quo in no-man's land between the lines of the two parties". During this time the Israelis launched several attacks on the Old City. On 9 July it was subjected to an all night bombardment with 6" mortars. In the last major attack, on the night of 15 July, 500 shells were fired into the walled city over a period of three hours, causing many civilian casualties. It was followed by attacks on the New Gate, the Jaffa Gate and the Zion Gate. Men from the Irgun briefly forced their way through the New Gate but as the other attacks failed they retreated. At one of the cease-fire meetings El Tell advised the Israelis to stop wasting their 6-inch mortars on the Rawdah school beside the Temple Mount (Haram al-Sharif) since he was no longer using it as his headquarters.

== Governor of East Jerusalem ==
As El Tell became more involved with the internal politics of the Old City and Glubb, his commander in chief, wanted to move the 6th Battalion out of Jerusalem it was agreed that El Tell should become Military Governor.

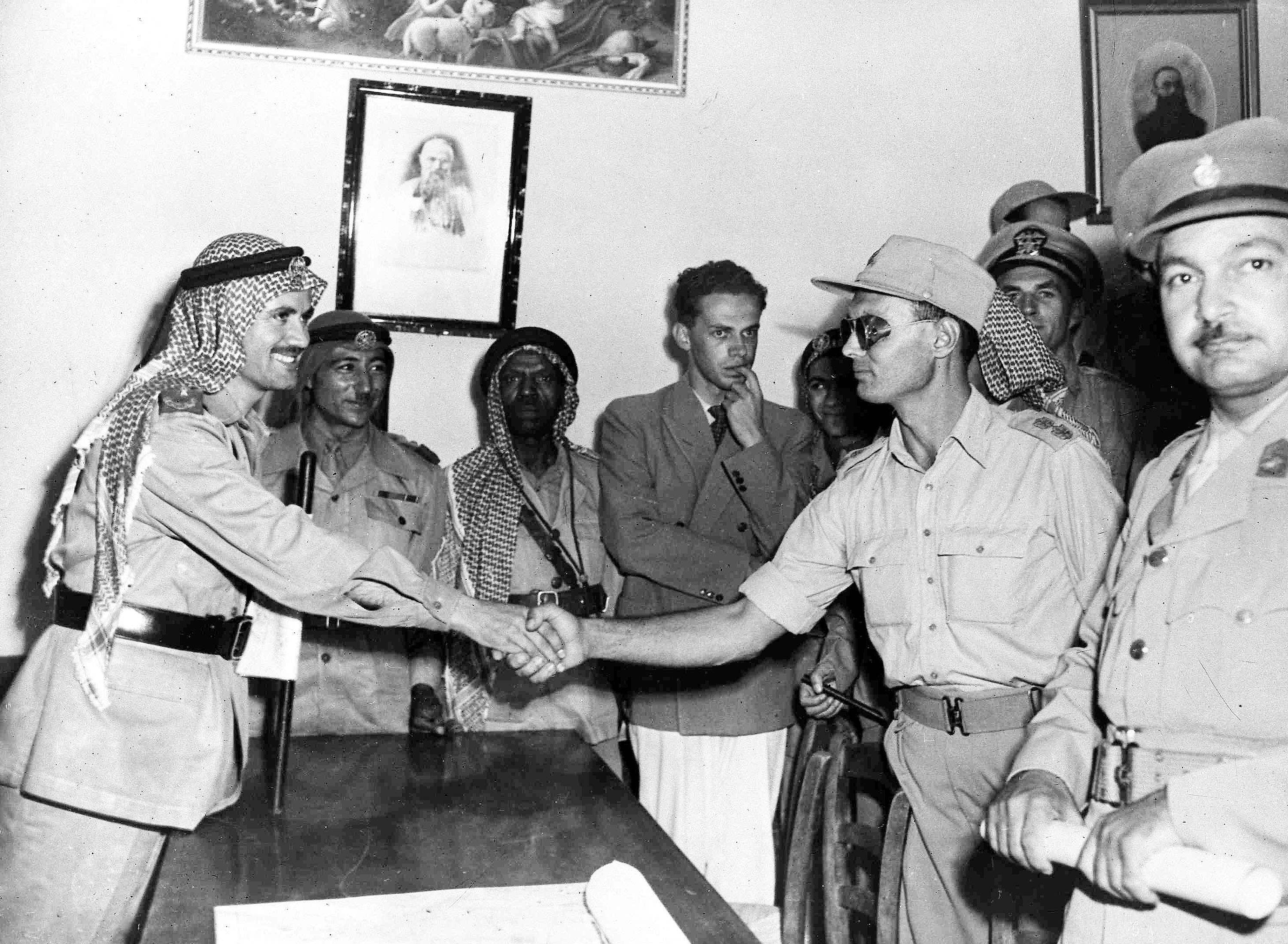
Abdullah El Tell and Moshe Dayan, Jerusalem, 30 November 1948

On 28 November, El Tell began a series of meetings with Israeli colonel Moshe Dayan, the new military commander of Israeli-controlled Jerusalem, with the objective of establishing a "real cease-fire". On 30 November, an agreement was signed which included provision for a fortnightly convoy to Mount Scopus. The two commanders got on well together and on Dayan's suggestion agreed to establish a direct phone link. On 10 December 1948, Dayan gave a sealed letter to El Tell to be delivered to King Abdullah. Before delivering the letter El Tell discreetly lifted the seal and made a photostatic copy of its contents, which was an invitation from Elias Sasson to King Abdullah to restart the negotiations which had been led by Golda Meir before the outbreak of war. On 11 December Sasson met El Tell and King Abdullah's confidant and personal physician, Shawkat al-Sati. At a meeting on 14 December, Sasson recorded El Tell saying "strike the Egyptians as much as you like. Our attitude will be totally neutral." There followed a number of secret meetings between Dayan and King Abdullah when El Tell personally took Dayan wearing a red kefieh to the King's winter palace at Shuneh.

An early proposal put forward by El Tell was that Jews would have control over the Jewish Quarter in exchange for Jordanian control over the Katamon Quarter and that the road at Latrun would be opened to both parties. This was rejected by Ben-Gurion. A second proposal was that there should be joint control of the road at Latrun in exchange for allowing a number of refugees to return to Ramle and Lydda and that the railway to Jerusalem be reopened in exchange for the opening of the road from Bethlehem to the Jaffa Gate. But Ben-Gurion was opposed to partial agreements rather than a complete peace treaty. He instructed his negotiators to refuse the return of refugees to Ramle and Jaffa, but to leave open the question of Arabs returning to Lydda and to mention the possibility of an access corridor to Gaza. King Abdullah's demands were a Jordan/Egypt corridor, control of the Old City except the Jewish Quarter; also control of Katamon, the German Colony, Talpiot and Ramat Rahel in exchange for Israel having Lifta and Romema, all of which the Israelis had conquered. By the autumn of 1949 King Abdullah was willing to abandon claims to Ramle and Lydda but was holding out for an access corridor to Gaza which he did not want under Egyptian control. One of the outcomes of the early meeting was the release of all Jewish prisoners a month before the armistice talks began in Rhodes.

Nine years later El Tell wrote an account of his reactions during the first meeting between Sasson and the King, on 16 January 1949:

"I had expected His Majesty to be clever and cautious, taking without giving, terrorising without coveting. I almost melted with shame when His Majesty began to reveal his cards in a frightening way and speak in servile and fatuous manner."

Dayan, El Tell and King Abdullah were involved in a series of meetings between 18 and 23 March 1949 at which the "Israel-Transjordanian Armistice Agreement" was finalised. In June 1949 El Tell resigned. According to Dayan it was because of the King's cooperation with the British. Other suggestions are it was because Glubb refused to promote him to Brigadier, that he feared the uncovering of a conspiracy against the king which he was involved with or that he was dismissed due to his popularity with the Palestinians. He left Jerusalem and returned to Irbid.

== Exile ==
From Irbid, El Tell moved to Syria, where he met Husni al-Za'im, who had become Commander-in-Chief of the Syrian Army in May 1948, and had seized power on 30 March 1949 in a bloodless coup. This was the first of many coups that would occur in Syria during the 20th century. Dayan states that El Tell "was impressed by al-Za'im and the idea of [doing] something similar". Al-Za'im was executed on 14 August 1949 in a second military coup. At the end of January 1950, El Tell moved to Cairo, where, according to Glubb, the Egyptian Government offered him a salary. Dayan says that he became commander of a guerrilla battalion "harassing British troops stationed in the Canal area". On his arrival in Cairo El Tell presented the Egyptian press with copies of letters from King Abdullah, claiming that British officers in the Arab Legion had prevented their units from fighting. He went so far to even say that King Abdullah was a traitor and responsible for the loss of Palestine. He called for the Arab League to set up an inquiry.

On 20 July 1951 King Abdullah was assassinated in Jerusalem. His assassin was killed on the spot, and in the following trial four Palestinians were sentenced to death and El Tell was found guilty of having been "an accessory before the fact" and sentenced to death in absentia. In particular it was claimed that at a secret meeting in Cairo, he gave Dr. Musa al Husseini £70 towards paying the assassin. Whilst admitting that he had been involved in a conspiracy to replace Abdullah with his son Talal, he always maintained he had no part in the killing. At a Cairo press conference he is quoted as saying "If Glubb Pasha had been assassinated I should have been the murderer, but King Abdullah—No!"

In 1958, El Tell published his account of events under the title "The catastrophe of Palestine".

In 1965, he received a full pardon from King Hussein and returned to Jordan, where he took a civil service post in Amman.

In January 1967, El Tell wrote a letter to Egyptian President Gamal Abdul Nasser chastising him for using the late King Abdullah's memoirs against Jordan. El Tell wrote: "Abdullah's positions [on the Palestine question]... were shown to be far-sighted leading to the preservation of Jerusalem."

In August 1967, he wrote a foreword to Taysir Zibyan's book on King Abdullah, where he exonerated the late King of any wrongdoing during his negotiation with the Israelis between 1948 and 1949 and adopted the official Jordanian narrative. He continued: "I consider that justice, fairness, and national duty dictate to the Arab nation that King Abdullah be considered a nationalist hero. If erecting statues in order to immortalise heroes was part of our religion and traditions, it would have been imperative that a statue of King Abdullah be erected in every capital of every Arab country."

He was later appointed by King Hussein to the Jordanian upper house of parliament as Senator, which he served until 1972 when he died.

== Character ==
Glubb describes El Tell as "well educated" but adds bitterly "it is remarkable the duplicity these young men can show." Dayan is more positive: "El Tell is a young man, sinewy, handsome, light skinned, with a directness about him—he looked you straight in the eye—and an open and friendly smile." "El Tell impressed me as being far superior to the other Arab officers and political functionaries I encountered in that period, he hated the British officials who were the real rulers in Amman, and was contemptuous of his friends who toadied to them." Collins and Lapierre quote Pablo de Azcarate who witnessed the surrender of the Jewish Quarter as observing that he behaved "without a single word or gesture which could have humiliated or offended the defeated leader in any way." Also that El Tell moved amongst the civilians "seeking to reassure them." They describe him as being "an avid student of history." It should also be noted that in their acknowledgements they state that "El Tell was a source of enormous help." Dov Joseph is less generous: "A typical urban Arab of the upper class named Abdullah El Tell. Between thirty and thirty-five, somewhat foppish and lithe in his movements, a little effeminate ... no strong personality of his own and was known to us to be completely under British influence."

Walter Eytan, head of Israel's Foreign Affairs Ministry, was involved in many of the meetings with King Abdullah. He describes El Tell as being the King's long-time favourite and that he "stood out from the rest of the King's advisers, maintaining an attitude of utter cynicism". Eytan continues: "He seemed to be wholly without illusions about the Arabs, the British and everyone else. He spoke about the King, even in the King's presence, in a way which could only be described as contemptuous, and yet seemed to feel affection for him and to be genuinely anxious to safeguard his interests."

== In film ==
In the 2006 film O Jerusalem, El Tell has a small role played by Anatol Yusef.

== See also ==
- Mustafa Wahbi Tal
- Wasfi Tal
- Lina Attel
- Bayan Tal
