= 2012–13 Crystal Palace F.C. season =

English football club season

Crystal Palace
2012–13 season
- Co-chairmen: Jeremy Hosking; Martin Long; Stephen Browett; Steve Parish
- Manager: Dougie Freedman; Lennie Lawrence/Curtis Fleming (caretaker); Ian Holloway
- Stadium: Selhurst Park
- Championship: 5th (promoted via play-off)
- FA Cup: Third round
- League Cup: Second round
- Top goalscorer: League: Glenn Murray (30); All: Glenn Murray (31)
- Highest home attendance: 22,154 (vs. Peterborough, 4 May)
- Lowest home attendance: 12,757 (vs. Cardiff City, 22 September)
- Average home league attendance: 17,280
Home colours	Away colours

The 2012–13 season was Crystal Palace's eighth consecutive season in the Championship. That season saw Dougie Freedman take charge for a third season, before departing to manage Bolton Wanderers on 23 October. Lennie Lawrence and Curtis Fleming acted in caretaker roles, with Lawrence managing for the away games against Barnsley and Leicester City which saw Palace take four points. Although Ian Holloway was appointed manager on 3 November, Fleming took charge for that day's home win against Blackburn Rovers. Holloway's first game in charge was the 5–0 home win against Ipswich Town which saw the club climb to the top of the table.

The 2–1 away victory against Peterborough United on 10 November saw the club make its best start to a league season in 37 years. With the following home win against Derby County on 17 November, Palace extended its unbeaten run to 14 games, a run ended by the away defeat to Leeds United on 24 November. Palace managed to score in every single one of its first 18 matches of the 2012–13 Championship season, a feat unmatched in the division during the season. Despite a poor run towards the end of the season with only 1 win in their final 10 league games, Crystal Palace gained promotion to the Premier League for the first time in 8 years after beating Watford 1–0 in the 2013 Football League Championship play-off final at Wembley. The club's 2012–13 season was subject of an Amazon Prime Video five-part series, ‘When Eagles Dare’, documenting their promotion to the top flight via the Championship playoffs.

In the League Cup, Palace beat Exeter City away, coming from behind to win 2–1, before losing to Preston North End, again away from home, in the second round. The third round of the FA Cup saw Palace entertain Stoke City, with a 0–0 home draw forcing a replay, though they ended up losing that game 4–1.

== Squad statistics ==
=== Statistics ===
As of 28 May 2013.

No.	Pos.	Name	Championship*			FA Cup			League Cup			Total			Discipline		History		
No.	Pos.	Name	Apps	Goals	Assists	Apps	Goals	Assists	Apps	Goals	Assists	Apps	Goals	Assists	Yellow card	Red card	Since	Apps	Goals
1	GK	(Argentina) Julián Speroni	49	0	0	0	0	0	0	0	0	49	0	0	0	0	2004	309	0
2	DF	(England) Joel Ward	29	0	1	0	0	0	2	0	0	31	0	1	3	0	2012	31	0
3	MF	(England) David Wright	1	0	0	0	0	0	2	0	0	3	0	0	0	0	2010	57	0
3	DF	(Wales) Ashley Richards	11	0	2	0	0	0	0	0	0	11	0	2	0	0	2013	11	0
4	DF	(Norway) Jonathan Parr	38	0	3	1	0	0	0	0	0	39	0	3	3	0	2011	84	2
5	DF	(Republic of Ireland) Paddy McCarthy	0	0	0	0	0	0	0	0	0	0	0	0	0	0	2008	147	6
6	DF	(England) Aaron Martin	4	0	0	0	0	0	2	0	0	6	0	0	1	0	2012	6	0
6	MF	(England) Jacob Butterfield	9	0	0	0	0	0	0	0	0	9	0	0	0	0	2013	9	0
7	MF	(Democratic Republic of the Congo) Yannick Bolasie (Note: Bolasie was born in Lyon, France, but also qualifies to represent England and DR Congo internationally and made his international debut for DR Congo in March 2013.)	45	3	8	2	0	0	1	0	0	48	3	8	6	0	2012	48	3
8	MF	(South Africa) Kagisho Dikgacoi	42	4	4	0	0	0	1	1	0	43	5	4	9	0	2010	87	8
9	FW	(Scotland) David Goodwillie	1	0	0	0	0	0	0	0	0	1	0	0	0	0	2012	1	0
9	FW	(England) Kevin Phillips	16	7	0	0	0	0	0	0	0	16	7	0	0	0	2013	16	7
10	MF	(Republic of Ireland) Owen Garvan	31	4	7	0	0	0	2	0	0	33	4	7	0	0	2010	84	10
11	FW	(Scotland) Stephen Dobbie	15	3	2	0	0	0	0	0	0	15	3	2	0	0	2013	15	3
12	MF	(England) Alex Marrow	4	0	0	0	0	0	0	0	0	4	0	0	1	0	2010	31	0
14	DF	(Wales) Darcy Blake	10	0	0	0	0	0	1	0	0	11	0	0	2	0	2012	11	0
15	MF	(Australia) Mile Jedinak	44	3	3	2	0	0	0	0	0	46	3	3	12	0	2011	81	4
16	MF	(England) Wilfried Zaha (Note: Zaha was born in Abidjan, Ivory Coast, but was raised in England from the age of 4, and represented them at U-19 and U-21 level before making his international debut for England in November 2012. He would switch his international allegiance back to the Ivory Coast in November 2016 and made his international debut for the Ivory Coast in January 2017.)	46	8	8	2	0	0	2	0	1	50	8	8	11	0	2010	142	18
17	FW	(England) Glenn Murray	43	30	6	1	1	0	1	0	0	45	31	6	9	0	2011	88	38
18	FW	(England) Aaron Wilbraham	24	0	3	1	0	0	2	1	0	27	1	3	1	0	2012	27	1
19	FW	(Wales) Jermaine Easter	8	1	1	2	0	0	1	1	0	11	2	1	1	0	2011	61	10
20	MF	(Wales) Jonny Williams (Note: Williams was born in Pembury, England, but also qualifies to represent Wales internationally through his father and represented them at U-17, U-19, and U-21 level before making his international debut for Wales in March 2013.)	30	0	2	2	0	0	1	0	1	33	0	3	1	0	2011	51	1
21	DF	(England) Dean Moxey	33	0	4	1	0	0	2	0	0	36	0	4	7	1	2011	82	1
22	MF	(England) Stuart O'Keefe	7	0	0	1	0	0	2	0	0	10	0	0	3	0	2010	33	0
23	FW	(England) Alex Nimely (Note: Nimely was born in Monrovia, Liberia, but also qualifies to represent England internationally through his father and has represented them at U-20 level. He has since switched his international allegiance back to Liberia.)	2	0	0	0	0	0	0	0	0	2	0	0	0	0	2010	2	0
24	FW	(England) Kwesi Appiah (Note: Appiah was born in Thamesmead, England, but also qualifies to represent Ghana internationally and would make his international debut for Ghana in January 2015.)	2	0	0	1	0	0	2	0	0	5	0	0	0	0	2012	11	0
25	MF	(England) Kyle De Silva	1	0	0	0	0	0	1	0	0	2	0	0	0	0	2012	9	0
26	DF	(England) Matthew Parsons	0	0	0	1	0	0	0	0	0	1	0	0	0	0	2010	10	0
27	DF	(Republic of Ireland) Damien Delaney	42	3	2	2	0	0	0	0	0	44	3	2	8	1	2012	44	3
28	DF	(England) Peter Ramage	40	4	1	2	0	0	1	0	0	43	4	1	0	0	2012	66	4
29	FW	(England) Ibra Sekajja (Note: Sekajja was born in Mulago, Uganda, but was raised in England and has represented them at U-16 level.)	0	0	0	0	0	0	0	0	0	0	0	0	0	0	2011	3	1
30	MF	(Brazil) André Moritz	29	5	2	2	0	0	1	0	0	32	5	2	1	0	2012	32	5
33	DF	(Wales) Danny Gabbidon	14	1	0	1	0	0	0	0	0	15	1	0	0	0	2012	15	0
34	GK	(Wales) Lewis Price (Note: Price was born in Bournemouth, England, but also qualified to represent Wales internationally and made his international debut for Wales in November 2005.)	0	0	0	2	0	0	2	0	0	4	0	0	0	0	2010	14	0
35	FW	(England) Bayan Fenwick	0	0	0	0	0	0	0	0	0	0	0	0	0	0	2011	0	0
36	DF	(England) Alex Wynter	0	0	0	0	0	0	0	0	0	0	0	0	0	0	2010	1	0
37	MF	(England) Hiram Boateng	0	0	0	1	0	0	0	0	0	1	0	0	0	0	2012	1	0
38	FW	(England) Jason Banton	0	0	0	1	0	0	0	0	0	1	0	0	1	0	2012	1	0
40	GK	(England) Ross Fitzsimmons	0	0	0	0	0	0	0	0	0	0	0	0	0	0	2011	0	0
41	DF	(England) Quade Taylor	0	0	0	0	0	0	0	0	0	0	0	0	0	0	2011	0	0

* including play-off appearances Green means the player is on loan, red means that a loan was terminated.

=== Goalscorers ===
Ranking	No.	Player	Championship	FA Cup	League Cup	Total
1	17	(England) Glenn Murray	30	1	0	31
2	16	(England) Wilfried Zaha	8	0	0	8
3	9	(England) Kevin Phillips	7	0	0	7
4	30	(Brazil) André Moritz	5	0	0	5
5	8	(South Africa) Kagisho Dikgacoi	4	0	1	5
6	10	(Republic of Ireland) Owen Garvan	4	0	0	4
6	28	(England) Peter Ramage	4	0	0	4
8	27	(Republic of Ireland) Damien Delaney	3	0	0	3
8	7	(Democratic Republic of the Congo) Yannick Bolasie	3	0	0	3
8	15	(Australia) Mile Jedinak	3	0	0	3
8	11	(England) Stephen Dobbie	3	0	0	3
12	19	(England) Jermaine Easter	1	0	1	2
13	33	(Wales) Danny Gabbidon	1	0	0	1
14	18	(England) Aaron Wilbraham	0	0	1	1
Total			76	1	3	80

== Transfers ==
Players transferred in
Date	Pos.	Age	Name	Club	Fee	Ref.
28 May 2012	DF	22	(England) Joel Ward	(England) Portsmouth	£400,000	
7 July 2012	FW	32	(England) Aaron Wilbraham	(England) Norwich City	Free	
7 August 2012	DF	28	(England) Peter Ramage	(England) Queens Park Rangers	Free	
24 August 2012	DF	23	(Wales) Darcy Blake	(Wales) Cardiff City	Undisclosed	
24 August 2012	MF	23	(Democratic Republic of the Congo) Yannick Bolasie	(England) Bristol City	Undisclosed	
24 August 2012	MF	26	(Brazil) André Moritz	(Turkey) Mersin İdmanyurdu	Free	
31 August 2012	DF	31	(Republic of Ireland) Damien Delaney	(England) Ipswich Town	Free	
18 September 2012	DF	33	(Wales) Danny Gabbidon	(England) Queens Park Rangers	Free	
Players loaned in
Start date	Pos.	Age	Name	Club	End date	Ref.
1 July 2012	DF	22	(England) Aaron Martin	(England) Southampton	End of season	
31 August 2012	FW	23	(Scotland) David Goodwillie	(England) Blackburn Rovers	1 January 2013	
10 January 2013	FW	21	(England) Alex Nimely	(England) Manchester City	End of season	
16 January 2013	MF	22	(England) Jacob Butterfield	(England) Norwich City	19 February 2013	
25 January 2013	DF	21	(Wales) Jazz Richards	(Wales) Swansea City	End of season	
25 January 2013	FW	20	(England) Wilfried Zaha	(England) Manchester United	End of season	
31 January 2013	FW	39	(England) Kevin Phillips	(England) Blackpool	End of season	
31 January 2013	FW	30	(Scotland) Stephen Dobbie	(England) Brighton & Hove Albion	End of season	
Players transferred out
Date	Pos.	Age	Name	Club	Fee	Ref.
22 June 2012	FW	21	(Republic of Ireland) Sean Scannell	(England) Huddersfield Town	Undisclosed	
13 July 2012	MF	28	(England) Darren Ambrose	(England) Birmingham City	Undisclosed	
19 July 2012	DF	21	(England) Nathaniel Clyne	(England) Southampton	Undisclosed	
Unknown	FW	21	(Mexico) Antonio Pedroza	(Mexico) Morelia	£150,000	
25 January 2013	FW	20	(England) Wilfried Zaha	(England) Manchester United	£15,000,000	
Players loaned out
Start date	Pos.	Age	Name	Club	End date	Ref.
17 August 2012	MF	22	(England) Alex Marrow	(England) Fleetwood Town	1 January 2013	
30 August 2012	DF	20	(England) Matthew Parsons	(England) Wycombe Wanderers	30 September 2012	
14 September 2012	DF	32	(England) David Wright	(England) Gillingham	14 October 2012	
14 September 2012	FW	22	(England) Kwesi Appiah	(England) Aldershot Town	14 October 2012	
7 November 2012	FW	20	(England) Ibra Sekajja	(England) MK Dons	1 January 2013	
11 January 2013	FW	20	(England) Ibra Sekajja	(England) Barnet	11 February 2013	
11 January 2013	GK	18	(Republic of Ireland) Ross Fitzsimons	(England) Harrow Borough	11 February 2013	
28 January 2013	FW	22	(England) Kwesi Appiah	(England) Yeovil Town	2 March 2013	
31 January 2013	FW	20	(England) Jason Banton	(England) Plymouth Argyle	2 March 2013	
Players released
Date	Pos.	Age	Name	Subsequent club	Join date	Ref.
21 May 2012	DF	31	(England) Anthony Gardner	(England) Sheffield Wednesday	21 June 2012	
21 May 2012	DF	20	(England) Jake Caprice	(England) Blackpool	9 July 2012	
21 May 2012	DF	22	(England) Lee Hills	(England) Stevenage	18 July 2012	
21 May 2012	FW	21	(England) Nathaniel Pinney	(England) Croydon	Unknown	
21 May 2012	DF	20	(England) Charlie Holness	(England) Leatherhead	Unknown	
10 August 2012	MF	22	(England) Kieron Cadogan	(England) Aldershot Town	29 September 2012	
31 August 2012	MF	30	(Wales) Andy Dorman	(United States) New England Revolution	15 November 2012	
21 May 2012	FW	25	(England) Calvin Andrew	(England) Port Vale	26 November 2012	
25 January 2013	DF	32	(England) David Wright·	(England) Colchester United	25 January 2013	

== League table ==
Pos	Team	Pld	W	D	L	GF	GA	GD	Pts	Promotion or relegation
3	Watford	46	23	8	15	85	58	+27	77	Qualification for Championship play-offs
4	Brighton & Hove Albion	46	19	18	9	69	43	+26	75	Qualification for Championship play-offs
5	Crystal Palace (O, P)	46	19	15	12	73	62	+11	72	Qualification for Championship play-offs
6	Leicester City	46	19	11	16	71	48	+23	68	Qualification for Championship play-offs
7	Bolton Wanderers	46	18	14	14	69	61	+8	68	

Updated to match(es) played on 4 May 2013. Source: BBC Sport
Rules for classification: 1) points; 2) goal difference; 3) number of goals scored.
(O) Play-off winners; (P) Promoted

== Matches ==
=== Round by Round results ===
Round	1	2	3	4	5	6	7	8	9	10	11	12	13	14	15	16	17	18	19	20	21	22	23	24	25	26	27	28	29	30	31	32	33	34	35	36	37	38	39	40	41	42	43	44	45	46
Ground	H	A	A	H	A	H	H	A	A	H	H	A	A	H	H	A	H	A	A	H	H	A	H	A	A	H	A	H	A	H	A	H	H	A	A	H	H	A	H	A	H	A	H	A	A	H
Result	L	L	L	W	W	D	W	W	W	W	D	D	W	W	W	W	W	L	D	W	D	D	D	L	D	W	L	D	L	W	D	W	W	L	W	W	D	L	L	L	D	L	D	D	D	W
Position	16	24	24	23	18	16	14	10	6	4	4	4	4	3	1	1	1	2	2	1	2	2	3	4	4	3	4	4	5	5	5	4	4	4	4	4	3	4	4	4	4	5	5	5	5	5

Updated to match(es) played on 4 June 2013. Source: stats.football365.com
A = Away; H = Home; W = Win; D = Draw; L = Loss

==== Pre-season results ====
20 July 2012	Lewes	1–5	Crystal Palace	Lewes
19:45	Schaaf 50'	Report	Wilbraham 24'; Baxter 32'; Zaha 42'; Fenwick 65'; Easter 75'	Stadium: The Dripping Pan; Attendance: 971

24 July 2012	Dulwich Hamlet	0–3	Crystal Palace XI	London
19:45		Report	Woodley 51'; Taylor 74'; Allassani 84'	Stadium: Champion Hill; Attendance: 1,312

27 July 2012	Margate	3–1	Crystal Palace XI	Margate
19:45	Whitnall 12' (pen.); Rook 39'; Christian-Law 49'	Report	Sekajja 20'	Stadium: Hartsdown Park; Attendance: 1,449

28 July 2012	Aldershot Town	0–2	Crystal Palace	Aldershot
15:00		Report	O'Keefe 38'; Zaha 80'	Stadium: Recreation Ground; Attendance: 1,356

1 August 2012	Cray Wanderers	0–1	Crystal Palace XI	Bromley
19:45		Report	Appiah 25'	Stadium: Hayes Lane; Attendance: 551

4 August 2012	Welling United	2–1	Crystal Palace	Welling
15:00	Obersteller 52'; Baker 58'	Report	Dikgacoi 59'	Stadium: Park View Road; Attendance: 745

8 August 2012	Swindon Town	0–1	Crystal Palace	Swindon
19:45		Report	Easter 10' (pen.)	Stadium: County Ground; Attendance: 4,312

11 August 2012	Reading	2–0	Crystal Palace	Reading
15:00	Pogrebnyak 52'; Le Fondre 53'	Report		Stadium: Madejski Stadium; Attendance: 6,251

==== Championship results ====
18 August 2012	Crystal Palace	2–3	Watford	London
15:00	Garvan 13' (pen.), 29'	Report	Taylor 22'; Abdi 88'; Vydra 90'	Stadium: Selhurst Park; Attendance: 17,109

21 August 2012	Bristol City	4–1	Crystal Palace	Bristol
19:45	Taylor 9'; Woolford 12'; Stead 59' (pen.); Adomah 82'	Report	Dikgacoi 74'	Stadium: Ashton Gate; Attendance: 12,221; Referee: Michael Naylor

25 August 2012	Middlesbrough	2–1	Crystal Palace	Middlesbrough
15:00	Hines 41'; Zemmama 52'	Report	Easter 56' (pen.)	Stadium: Riverside Stadium; Attendance: 15,494

1 September 2012	Crystal Palace	2–1	Sheffield Wednesday	London
15:00	Murray 1', 83'	Report	Antonio 50'	Stadium: Selhurst Park; Attendance: 14,043; Referee: R Lewis

14 September 2012	Charlton Athletic	0–1	Crystal Palace	London
19:45		Report	Dikgacoi 51'	Stadium: The Valley; Attendance: 21,730; Referee: T Bates

18 September 2012	Crystal Palace	1–1	Nottingham Forest	London
20:00	Dikgacoi 50'	Report	Blackstock 81'	Stadium: Selhurst Park; Attendance: 13,153; Referee: I Williamson

22 September 2012	Crystal Palace	3–2	Cardiff City	London
15:00	Murray 52' (pen.), 62', 72' (pen.)	Report	Gunnarsson 13'; Cowie 15'	Stadium: Selhurst Park; Attendance: 12,757; Referee: G Ward

29 September 2012	Bolton Wanderers	0–1	Crystal Palace	Bolton
15:00		Report	Murray 80' (pen.)	Stadium: Reebok Stadium; Attendance: 16,727; Referee: G Eltrigham

2 October 2012	Wolverhampton Wanderers	1–2	Crystal Palace	Wolverhampton
19:45	Ebanks-Blake 53'	Report	Zaha 67', 73'	Stadium: Molineux Stadium; Attendance: 19,561; Referee: Graham Salisbury

6 October 2012	Crystal Palace	4–3	Burnley	London
15:00	Zaha 41', 53'; Delaney 66'; Murray 75'	Report	McCann 26'; Paterson 29'; Austin 81'	Stadium: Selhurst Park; Attendance: 20,863; Referee: East

20 October 2012	Crystal Palace	2–2	Millwall	London
13:00	Jedinak 35'; Delaney 39'	Report	Trotter 42' (pen.); Beevers 77'	Stadium: Selhurst Park; Attendance: 16,124; Referee: P Dowd

23 October 2012	Barnsley	1–1	Crystal Palace	Barnsley
19:45	Perkins 86'	Report	Murray 11'	Stadium: Oakwell; Attendance: 8,195; Referee: Webb

27 October 2012	Leicester City	1–2	Crystal Palace	Leicester
15:00	King 90'	Report	Delaney 23'; Ramage 28'	Stadium: King Power Stadium; Attendance: 23,646; Referee: Haines

3 November 2012	Crystal Palace	2–0	Blackburn Rovers	London
15:00	Murray 45', 65' (pen.)	Report		Stadium: Selhurst Park; Attendance: 16,744; Referee: L Probert

6 November 2012	Crystal Palace	5–0	Ipswich Town	London
20:00	Bolasie 24'; Murray 50' (pen.), 55' (pen.), 63'; Moritz 90'	Report		Stadium: Selhurst Park; Attendance: 15,517; Referee: Sheldrake

10 November 2012	Peterborough United	1–2	Crystal Palace	Peterborough
15:00	McCann 6'	Report	Moritz 80'; Dikgacoi 82'	Stadium: London Road; Attendance: 9,691; Referee: Sutton

17 November 2012	Crystal Palace	3–0	Derby County	London
15:00	Murray 12', 82'; Moritz 58'	Report		Stadium: Selhurst Park; Attendance: 16,221; Referee: Graham

24 November 2012	Leeds United	2–1	Crystal Palace	Leeds
15:00	Becchio 52'; Green 76'	Report	Ramage 86'	Stadium: Elland Road; Attendance: 20,964; Referee: Coote

27 November 2012	Hull City	0–0	Crystal Palace	Hull
19:45		Report		Stadium: KC Stadium; Attendance: 16,656; Referee: Drysdale

1 December 2012	Crystal Palace	3–0	Brighton & Hove Albion	London
15:00	Murray 38', 54' (pen.); Garvan 71' (pen.)	Report		Stadium: Selhurst Park; Attendance: 20,114; Referee: Russell

8 December 2012	Crystal Palace	2–2	Blackpool	London
15:00	Garvan 52'; Murray 64'	Report	Delfouneso 37'; Dicko 89'	Stadium: Selhurst Park; Attendance: 15, 594; Referee: Stroud

15 December 2012	Birmingham	2–2	Crystal Palace	Birmingham
	Žigić 66'; Diop 82'	Report	Murray 39', 60'	Stadium: St Andrew's; Attendance: 17,158; Referee: Mathieson

22 December 2012	Crystal Palace	1–1	Huddersfield	London
	Zaha 39'	Report	Southern 75'	Stadium: Selhurst Park; Attendance: 17,993; Referee: Scott

26 December 2012	Cardiff City	2–1	Crystal Palace	Cardiff
	Noone 44'; Gunnarsson 73'	Report	Jedinak 4'	Stadium: Cardiff City Stadium; Attendance: 26,098; Referee: Gibbs

29 December 2012	Nottingham Forest	2–2	Crystal Palace	Nottingham
	Reid 45'; Sharp 90'	Report	Murray 9', 81'	Stadium: City Ground; Attendance: 23,703; Referee: Haywood

1 January 2013	Crystal Palace	3–1	Wolverhampton Wanderers	London
15:00	Moritz 31', 52'; Bolasie 75'	Report	Ebanks-Blake 75'	Stadium: Selhurst Park; Attendance: 17,453; Referee: Phillips

12 January 2013	Burnley	1–0	Crystal Palace	Burnley
15:00	Stanislas 81'	Report		Stadium: Selhurst Park; Attendance: 11,564; Referee: Ward

19 January 2013	Crystal Palace	0–0	Bolton Wanderers	London
15:00				Stadium: Selhurst Park

30 January 2013	Huddersfield Town	1–0	Crystal Palace	Huddersfield
19:45	Vaughan 65'	Report		Stadium: John Smith's Stadium; Attendance: 13,471; Referee: Carl Boyeson

2 February 2013	Crystal Palace	2–1	Charlton Athletic	London
15:00	Murray 75', 79'	Report	Fuller 15'	Stadium: Selhurst Park; Attendance: 17,945; Referee: Halsey

8 February 2013	Watford	2–2	Crystal Palace	Watford
15:00	Abdi 6'; Chalobah 14'	Report	Ramage 66'; Phillips 70'	Stadium: Vicarage Road; Attendance: 15,079; Referee: Naylor

16 February 2013	Crystal Palace	4–1	Middlesbrough	London
	Murray 9', 57'; Ramage 48'; Phillips 84'	Report	Haroun 80'	Stadium: Selhurst Park; Attendance: 17,213; Referee: Langford

19 February 2013	Crystal Palace	2–1	Bristol City	London
	Murray 34'; Dobbie 65'	Report	Parr 90+4' (o.g.)	Stadium: Selhurst Park; Attendance: 16,191; Referee: Hooper

23 February 2013	Sheffield Wednesday	1–0	Crystal Palace	Sheffield
	Lita 81'	Report		Stadium: Hillsborough Stadium; Attendance: 23,475; Referee: Bates

1 March 2013	Derby County	0–1	Crystal Palace	Derby
		Report	Bolasie 13'	Stadium: Pride Park Stadium; Attendance: 23,065; Referee: Madley

5 March 2013	Crystal Palace	4–2	Hull City	London
	Phillips 45+4' (pen.), 52', 53'; Zaha 77'	Report	Simpson 73'; Meyler 90+2'	Stadium: Selhurst Park; Attendance: 16,230; Referee: Haywood

9 March 2013	Crystal Palace	2–2	Leeds United	London
	Murray 27', 84'	Report	Morison 56', 69'	Stadium: Selhurst Park; Attendance: 19,976; Referee: Whitestone

17 March 2013	Brighton & Hove Albion	3–0	Crystal Palace	Brighton
	Ulloa 43', 50'; López 45+3'	Report		Stadium: Falmer Stadium; Attendance: 28,499; Referee: Pawson

29 March 2013	Crystal Palace	0–4	Birmingham City	London
		Report	Redmond 24'; Delaney 32' (o.g.); Morrison 64'; Ferguson 69'	Stadium: Selhurst Park; Attendance: 17,189; Referee: Bobby Madley

1 April 2013	Blackpool	1–0	Crystal Palace	Blackpool
	Ferguson (yellow card) 32' (yellow-red card) 42'; Phillips 85'	Report		Stadium: Bloomfield Road; Attendance: 14,373; Referee: Haines

6 April 2013	Crystal Palace	0–0	Barnsley	London
		Report		Stadium: Selhurst Park; Attendance: 21,281; Referee: Stroud

16 April 2013	Ipswich Town	3–0	Crystal Palace	Ipswich
	Nouble 37', 45+4'; Cresswell 45+2'	Report		Stadium: Portman Road; Attendance: 17,656; Referee: Hooper

20 April 2013	Crystal Palace	2–2	Leicester City	London
	Gabbidon 26'; Dobbie 67'	Report	King 37'; Wood 73'	Stadium: Selhurst Park; Attendance: 18,563; Referee: Madley

27 April 2013	Blackburn Rovers	1–1	Crystal Palace	Blackburn
	Rhodes 42'	Report	Dobbie 28'	Stadium: Ewood Park; Attendance: 19,796; Referee: Phil Gibbs

30 April 2013	Millwall	0–0	Crystal Palace	London
		Report		Stadium: The Den; Attendance: 12,745; Referee: Salisbury

4 May 2013	Crystal Palace	3–2	Peterborough United	London
12:45	Murray 45+2' (pen.); Phillips 83'; Jedinak 89'	Report	Tomlin 28'; Mendez-Laing 63'	Stadium: Selhurst Park; Attendance: 22,154; Referee: Pawson

==== Championship Play-offs results ====
10 May 2013 First leg	Crystal Palace	0–0	Brighton & Hove Albion	London
19:45		Report		Stadium: Selhurst Park; Attendance: 23,294; Referee: Oliver

13 May 2013 Second leg	Brighton & Hove Albion	0–2	Crystal Palace	Brighton
19:45		Report	Zaha 69', 88'	Stadium: Falmer Stadium; Attendance: 29,518; Referee: Clattenburg

27 May 2013 Final	Crystal Palace	1–0 (a.e.t.)	Watford	London
15:00	Mile Jedinak (yellow card) 28'; O'Keefe (yellow card) 60'; Joel Ward (yellow card) 80'; Moxey (yellow card) 104'; Phillips 105+1' (pen.)	Report	Ekstrand (yellow card) 10'; Abdi (yellow card) 60'; Cassetti (yellow card) 105'	Stadium: Wembley Stadium; Attendance: 82,025; Referee: Atkinson

==== FA Cup results ====
5 January 2013 Third round	Crystal Palace	0–0	Stoke City	London
15:00		Report		Stadium: Selhurst Park; Attendance: 13,693; Referee: Swarbrick

15 January 2013 Third round replay	Stoke City	4–1 (a.e.t.)	Crystal Palace	Stoke-on-Trent
19:45	Jones 69'; Walters 95', 110'; Jerome 120'	Report	Murray 87' (pen.)	Stadium: Britannia Stadium; Attendance: 11,617; Referee: Anthony Taylor

==== Football League Cup results ====
14 August 2012	Exeter City	1–2	Crystal Palace	Exeter
19:45	O'Flynn 2'	Report	Easter 24' (pen.); Dikgacoi 43'	Stadium: St James Park; Attendance: 3,650; Referee: Phil Gibbs

28 August 2012	Preston North End	4–1	Crystal Palace	Preston, Lancashire
19:45	Wroe 2', 63'; Sodje 18'; Monakana 41'	Report	Wilbraham 37'	Stadium: Deepdale; Attendance: 5,194; Referee: Eddie Ilderton
