= 2014–15 Livingston F.C. season =

Livingston
2014–15 season
- Manager: John McGlynn (until 16 December); Mark Burchill
- Stadium: Almondvale Stadium
- Championship: 8th
- Scottish Cup: Third round
- League Cup: Third round
- Challenge Cup: Winners
- Top goalscorer: League: Jordan White (11); All: Jordan White (15)
- Highest home attendance: 8,178 vs. Heart of Midlothian, Championship, 27 December 2014
- Lowest home attendance: 620 vs. Queen of the South, League Cup, 26 August 2014
- Average home league attendance: 2,605
Home colours	Away colours

The 2014–15 season was Livingston's second season in the Scottish Championship and their fourth consecutive season in the second-tier of Scottish football, having been promoted from the Scottish Second Division during the 2010–11 season. Livingston also competed in the Challenge Cup, League Cup and the Scottish Cup.

== Summary ==
=== Management ===
Livingston began the 2014–15 season under the management of John McGlynn who had been appointed in September 2013. On the 16 December, McGlynn left his position as manager by way of ‘mutual consent’ and was replaced by Mark Burchill in a player/manager role. Off the field, Livingston had been deducted 5 points by the SPFL in November 2014 due to a breach in tax payments and were only spared from relegation on the final day of the season with a home victory over Queen of the South.

== Results and fixtures ==
Win Draw Loss Postponed

=== Pre Season ===
10 July 2014	Forfar Athletic	1–1	Livingston	Station Park, Forfar
19:30		Report

12 July 2014	Dunfermline Athletic	1–0	Livingston	Ainsley Park, Edinburgh
19:30	Forbes 16'	Report

16 July 2014	Arbroath	0–3	Livingston	Gayfield Park, Arbroath
19:45		Report

22 July 2014	Preston Athletic	1–5	Livingston	Pennypit Park, Prestonpans
19:30		Report

24 July 2014	Dalkeith Thistle	1–2	Livingston	King's Park, Dalkeith
19:30		Report

=== Scottish Championship ===
9 August 2014 1	Hibernian	2–1	Livingston	Easter Road, Edinburgh
15:00	El Alagui 16'; Oxley 19'	Report	Gallagher 60'	Attendance: 9,390; Referee: Bobby Madden

16 August 2014 2	Livingston	2–1	Cowdenbeath	Almondvale Stadium, Livingston
15:00	Mullen 46'; White 74'	Report	Milne 89'	Attendance: 1,147; Referee: Euan Anderson

23 August 2014 3	Queen of the South	1–1	Livingston	Palmerston Park, Dumfries
15:00	Jacobs 34' (o.g.); Fowler (red card) 72'	Report	White 66' (pen.)	Attendance: 1,805; Referee: Greg Aitken

30 August 2014 4	Dumbarton	1–0	Livingston	Dumbarton Football Stadium, Dumbarton
15:00	Kane 89'	Report		Attendance: 814; Referee: Barry Cook

13 September 2014 5	Livingston	4–0	Alloa Athletic	Almondvale Stadium, Livingston
15:00	Fordyce 27'; White 33', 63', 77'	Report		Attendance: 1,150; Referee: Kevin Clancy

20 September 2014 6	Livingston	0–1	Raith Rovers	Almondvale Stadium, Livingston
15:00		Report	Scott 18'	Attendance: 1,309; Referee: Bobby Madden

28 September 2014 7	Heart of Midlothian	5–0	Livingston	Tynecastle Park, Edinburgh
16:05	El Hassnaoui 14'; Walker 30'; Sow 43', 90'; Keatings 87'	Report		Attendance: 14,848; Referee: Don Robertson

4 October 2014 8	Livingston	0–1	Rangers	Almondvale Stadium, Livingston
15:00		Report	Macleod 8'	Attendance: 5,924; Referee: Stephen Finnie

18 October 2014 9	Livingston	0–4	Hibernian	Almondvale Stadium, Livingston
15:00		Report	Malonga 31'; Handling 53'; McGeouch 70' (pen.); Heffernan 86'	Attendance: 2,666; Referee: Greg Aitken

21 October 2014 10	Falkirk	0–0	Livingston	Falkirk Stadium, Falkirk
19:45		Report		Attendance: 3,021; Referee: Andrew Dallas

25 October 2014 11	Livingston	2–2	Queen of the South	Almondvale Stadium, Livingston
15:00	Mullen 81'; Glen 88'	Report	Russell 31'; Reilly 69'	Attendance: 1,099; Referee: Kevin Graham

8 November 2014 12	Alloa Athletic	1–0	Livingston	Recreation Park, Alloa
15:00	Buchanan 48'	Report	Gallagher (red card) 90+4'	Attendance: 586; Referee: Matt Northcroft

15 November 2014 13	Livingston	1–2	Dumbarton	Almondvale Stadium, Livingston
15:00	Mullen 29'	Report	Fleming 62'; Megginson 70'	Attendance: 1,020; Referee: Stephen Finnie

22 November 2014 14	Cowdenbeath	1–0	Livingston	Central Park, Cowdenbeath
15:00	Gallagher 54'	Report		Attendance: 542; Referee: Alan Muir

6 December 2014 15	Raith Rovers	1–5	Livingston	Stark's Park, Kirkcaldy
15:00	Perry (red card) 2'; Anderson 45'	Report	White 3' (pen.); Burchill 23'; Glen 44'; Mullen 78'; McKenna 88'	Attendance: 1,385; Referee: Crawford Allan

13 December 2014 16	Livingston	0–1	Falkirk	Almondvale Stadium, Livingston
15:00		Report	Alston 28'	Attendance: 1,176; Referee: Barry Cook

20 December 2014 17	Rangers	2–0	Livingston	Ibrox Stadium, Glasgow
15:00	Aird 10'; Mensing 74' (o.g.)	Report		Attendance: 28,053; Referee: Willie Collum

27 December 2014 18	Livingston	0–1	Heart of Midlothian	Almondvale Stadium, Livingston
15:00		Report	Keatings 25'	Attendance: 8,178; Referee: John McKendrick

3 January 2015 19	Queen of the South	3–1	Livingston	Palmerston Park, Dumfries
15:00	Dowie 31'; Lyle 65'; Russell 76'	Report	White 39'	Attendance: 1,940; Referee: Greg Aitken

10 January 2015 20	Livingston	1–1	Cowdenbeath	Almondvale Stadium, Livingston
15:00	Mullen 4'	Report	Mensing 26' (o.g.)	Attendance: 829; Referee: George Salmond

24 January 2015 21	Dumbarton	1–5	Livingston	Dumbarton Football Stadium, Dumbarton
15:00	McCullam 87'	Report	White 5', 82'; Mullen 63', 73'; Jacobs 79'	Attendance: 793; Referee: Craig Charleston

3 February 2015 22	Livingston	0–0	Alloa Athletic	Almondvale Stadium, Livingston
15:00		Report		Attendance: 723; Referee: Euan Anderson

7 February 2015 23	Livingston	2–3	Heart of Midlothian	Almondvale Stadium, Livingston
15:00	Sives 52'; Jacobs 90+4' (pen.)	Report	Zeefuik 4'; Anderson 82'; Walker 84'	Attendance: 5,352; Referee: Brian Colvin

14 February 2015 24	Heart of Midlothian	1–0	Livingston	Tynecastle Park, Edinburgh
15:00	Walker 40'	Report	Praprotnik (red card) 74'	Attendance: 15,463; Referee: Alan Muir

21 February 2015 25	Falkirk	2–0	Livingston	Falkirk Stadium, Falkirk
15:00	Duffie 8'; Vaulks 16'	Report		Attendance: 3,780; Referee: Craig Thomson

28 February 2015 26	Livingston	0–2	Raith Rovers	Almondvale Stadium, Livingston
15:00		Report	Callachan 15'; Vaughan 21'	Attendance: 972; Referee: Don Robertson

11 March 2015 27	Hibernian	2–1	Livingston	Easter Road, Edinburgh
19:45	Cummings 31'; Dja Djédjé 89'	Report	Sekajja 88'	Attendance: 7,857; Referee: Stephen Finnie

14 March 2015 28	Rangers	1–1	Livingston	Ibrox Stadium, Glasgow
15:00	Vučkić 9'	Report	Sekajja 45'	Attendance: 35,066; Referee: Andrew Dallas

21 March 2015 29	Livingston	1–2	Dumbarton	Almondvale Stadium, Livingston
15:00	Sives 14'	Report	Agnew 80'; Fleming 88'	Attendance: 831; Referee: John McKendrick

28 March 2015 30	Alloa Athletic	2–2	Livingston	Recreation Park, Alloa
15:00	Buchanan 53', 73'	Report	Gordon 59' (o.g.); Boulding 89'	Attendance: 706; Referee: Willie Collum

8 April 2015 31	Livingston	2–1	Falkirk	Almondvale Stadium, Livingston
19:45	Mullen 9', 54'	Report	Baird 44' (pen.)	Attendance: 1,047; Referee: Euan Anderson

11 April 2015 32	Cowdenbeath	1–2	Livingston	Central Park, Cowdenbeath
15:00	Wedderburn 48'	Report	White 63', 80'	Attendance: 624; Referee: Crawford Allan

15 April 2015 33	Livingston	1–1	Rangers	Almondvale Stadium, Livingston
19:45	Hippolyte 47'	Report	Žaliūkas 49'	Attendance: 4,345; Referee: Greg Aitken

22 April 2015 34	Livingston	1–3	Hibernian	Almondvale Stadium, Livingston
19:45	Hippolyte 14'; Cole (red card) 45'	Report	Robertson 8'; Cummings 15'; Malonga 82'	Attendance: 2,301; Referee: Andrew Dallas

25 April 2015 35	Raith Rovers	0–4	Livingston	Stark's Park, Kirkcaldy
15:00		Report	Fordyce 19'; Sives 49'; Mullen 55'; Barr 71' (o.g.)	Attendance: 1,766; Referee: Kevin Graham

2 May 2015 36	Livingston	1–0	Queen of the South	Almondvale Stadium, Livingston
15:00	Jacobs 78' (pen.)	Report		Attendance: 2,475; Referee: Willie Collum

=== Scottish Challenge Cup ===
26 July 2014 First Round	Queen of the South	3–4 (a.e.t.)	Livingston	Palmerston Park, Dumfries
15:00	Dowie 24'; Russell 56'; Paton 107'	Report	Sives 58'; Mullen 65'; Hippolyte 98'; Robertson 115'	Attendance: 1,196; Referee: Craig Charleston

20 August 2014 Second Round	Livingston	4–1	Heart of Midlothian	Almondvale Stadium, Livingston
19:45	White 6', 76'; Hippolyte 81'; Robertson 84'	Report	Talbot 90+1' (o.g.)	Attendance: 3,807; Referee: Crawford Allan

6 September 2014 Quarter-Final	Peterhead	0–1 (a.e.t.)	Livingston	Balmoor Stadium, Peterhead
15:00	Rodgers (red card) 120+1'	Report	Hippolyte 113'	Attendance: 695; Referee: Brian Colvin

12 October 2014 Semi-Final	Livingston	1–1 (5–4 p)	Stranraer	Almondvale Stadium, Livingston
15:00	Glen 66'	Report	Longworth 45'	Attendance: 845; Referee: George Salmond

5 April 2015 Final	Livingston	4–0	Alloa Athletic	McDiarmid Park, Perth
15:00	Pittman 21'; Fordyce 61'; White 86', 90+2'	Report		Attendance: 2,869; Referee: John Beaton

=== Scottish League Cup ===
2 August 2014 First Round	Albion Rovers	0–0 (3–4 p)	Livingston	Cliftonhill, Coatbridge
15:00		Report		Attendance: 536; Referee: Des Roache

26 August 2014 Second Round	Livingston	1–0 (a.e.t.)	Queen of the South	Almondvale Stadium, Livingston
19:45	Hippolyte 119'	Report		Attendance: 620; Referee: George Salmond

23 September 2014 Third Round	Aberdeen	4–0	Livingston	Pittodrie, Aberdeen
19:45	Taylor 8'; Rooney 61', 74', 87'	Report		Attendance: 6,454; Referee: Andrew Dallas

=== Scottish Cup ===
1 November 2014 Third Round	Annan Athletic	3–2	Livingston	Galabank, Annan
15:00	Weatherson 20', 41'; McColm 58'	Report	Jacobs 13'; Mullen 83'	Attendance: 560; Referee: Euan Anderson

== Player statistics ==
As of 2 May 2015 (UTC)

No.	Pos	Nat	Player	Total		Championship		League Cup		Scottish Cup		Other	
No.	Pos	Nat	Player	Apps	Goals	Apps	Goals	Apps	Goals	Apps	Goals	Apps	Goals
1	GK	(Scotland) SCO	Darren Jamieson	45	0	36+0	0	3+0	0	1+0	0	5+0	0
2	DF	(Scotland) SCO	Craig Sives	28	4	20+1	3	2+1	0	1+0	0	3+0	1
3	DF	(Scotland) SCO	Jason Talbot	35	0	28+0	0	2+0	0	1+0	0	4+0	0
4	DF	(Scotland) SCO	Darren Cole	11	0	8+1	0	1+0	0	0+0	0	1+0	0
5	DF	(Scotland) SCO	Callum Fordyce	44	3	35+0	2	3+0	0	1+0	0	5+0	1
6	MF	(South Africa) RSA	Kyle Jacobs	43	2	34+0	2	3+0	0	1+0	0	5+0	0
7	MF	(South Africa) RSA	Keaghan Jacobs	39	2	32+0	1	2+0	0	1+0	1	4+0	0
8	MF	(Scotland) SCO	Burton O'Brien	37	0	28+0	0	3+0	0	1+0	0	5+0	0
9	FW	(England) ENG	Rory Boulding	4	1	0+4	1	0+0	0	0+0	0	0+0	0
11	FW	(England) ENG	Myles Hippolyte	42	6	12+21	2	0+3	1	1+0	0	1+4	3
12	GK	(Scotland) SCO	Kevin Walker	0	0	0+0	0	0+0	0	0+0	0	0+0	0
14	DF	(Scotland) SCO	Declan Gallagher	33	1	28+0	1	2+0	0	0+0	0	3+0	0
15	MF	(Slovenia) SVN	Nejc Praprotnik	9	0	4+5	0	0+0	0	0+0	0	0+0	0
16	MF	(Scotland) SCO	Jack Beaumont	5	0	1+2	0	0+0	0	0+0	0	0+2	0
17	MF	(Scotland) SCO	Michael McKenna	33	1	12+13	1	3+0	0	0+1	0	4+0	0
18	FW	(Scotland) SCO	Jordan White	44	15	28+7	11	2+1	0	1+0	0	3+2	4
19	FW	(Scotland) SCO	Gary Glen	38	3	18+11	2	3+0	0	1+0	0	3+2	1
20	FW	(Scotland) SCO	Danny Mullen	41	12	26+7	10	2+1	0	0+1	1	4+0	1
22	FW	(England) ENG	Ibra Sekajja	11	2	8+3	2	0+0	0	0+0	0	0+0	0
23	DF	(Scotland) SCO	Bradley Donaldson	3	0	1+2	0	0+0	0	0+0	0	0+0	0
25	FW	(Scotland) SCO	Scott Pittman	13	1	10+2	0	0+0	0	0+0	0	1+0	1
27	FW	(Scotland) SCO	Mark Burchill	14	1	4+7	1	0+1	0	0+0	0	0+2	0
30	DF	(Scotland) SCO	Shaun Rutherford	14	0	10+1	0	1+0	0	0+0	0	2+0	0
31	MF	(Scotland) SCO	Darren Moffat	0	0	0+0	0	0+0	0	0+0	0	0+0	0
33	MF	(Scotland) SCO	Ryan Currie	0	0	0+0	0	0+0	0	0+0	0	0+0	0
34	DF	(Scotland) SCO	Jordan Cook	0	0	0+0	0	0+0	0	0+0	0	0+0	0
Players who left the club during the 2014–15 season
4	MF	(England) ENG	Simon Mensing	7	0	6+0	0	1+0	0	0+0	0	0+0	0
9	FW	(England) ENG	Rob Ogleby	16	0	1+11	0	1+1	0	0+0	0	1+1	0
10	MF	(Scotland) SCO	David Robertson	19	2	6+7	0	1+1	0	0+1	0	1+2	2
21	GK	(Scotland) SCO	Paul Grant	0	0	0+0	0	0+0	0	0+0	0	0+0	0

== Team statistics ==
=== League table ===
Pos	Team	Pld	W	D	L	GF	GA	GD	Pts	Promotion, qualification or relegation
6	Raith Rovers	36	12	7	17	42	65	−23	43	
7	Dumbarton	36	9	7	20	36	79	−43	34	
8	Livingston (Note: Livingston were deducted 5 points due to failure of tax payments.)	36	8	8	20	41	53	−12	27	
9	Alloa Athletic (O)	36	6	9	21	34	56	−22	27	Qualification for the Championship play-offs
10	Cowdenbeath (R)	36	7	4	25	31	86	−55	25	Relegation to League One

Source: Soccerway
Rules for classification: 1) Points; 2) Goal difference; 3) Number of goals scored
(O) Play-off winners; (R) Relegated

=== Division summary ===
Round	1	2	3	4	5	6	7	8	9	10	11	12	13	14	15	16	17	18	19	20	21	22	23	24	25	26	27	28	29	30	31	32	33	34	35	36
Ground	A	H	A	A	H	H	A	H	H	A	H	H	H	A	A	H	A	H	A	H	A	H	H	A	A	H	A	A	H	A	H	A	H	H	A	H
Result	L	W	D	L	W	L	L	L	L	D	D	L	L	L	W	L	L	L	L	D	W	D	L	L	L	L	L	D	L	D	W	W	D	L	W	W
Position	8	6	5	6	5	5	6	8	10	8	8	9	9	10	10	10	10	10	10	10	10	10	10	10	10	10	10	10	10	10	10	10	10	10	9	8

Updated to match(es) played on 2 May 2015. Source:
A = Away; H = Home; W = Win; D = Draw; L = Loss

== Transfers ==
=== Players in ===
Player	From	Fee
(Scotland) David Robertson	(Scotland) Greenock Morton	Free
(Scotland) Jordan White	(Scotland) Stirling Albion	Free
(England) Robert Ogleby	(Wales) Wrexham	Free
(Scotland) Declan Gallagher	(Scotland) Dundee	Free
(Scotland) Bradley Donaldson	(Scotland) Hibernian	Free
(Scotland) Michael McKenna	(Scotland) Musselburgh Athletic	Free
(England) Myles Hippolyte	(England) Southall	Free
(Scotland) Gary Glen	(Scotland) Ross County	Free
(Scotland) Paul Grant	(Scotland) Hibernian	Free
(England) Ibra Sekajja	(Scotland) Inverness CT	Free
(Scotland) Scott Pittman	(Scotland) Bo'ness United	Free
(England) Rory Boulding	(Scotland) Falkirk	Free

=== Players out ===
Player	To	Fee
(Scotland) Danny Denholm	(Scotland) Forfar Athletic	Free
(Slovenia) Nejc Mevlja	(Romania) Pandurii Târgu Jiu	Free
(Scotland) Marc McNulty	(England) Sheffield United	Undisclosed
(Scotland) Martin Scott	(Scotland) Raith Rovers	Free
(Scotland) Andrew Barrowman	(Scotland) Greenock Morton	Free
(Scotland) Kyle Lander	(Scotland) St Johnstone	Free
(Scotland) Ross Docherty	(Scotland) Airdrieonians	Free
(England) Simon Mensing	(United States) Atlanta Silverbacks	Free

== See also ==
- List of Livingston F.C. seasons
