= Kagisho Dikgacoi =

South African footballer (born 1984)

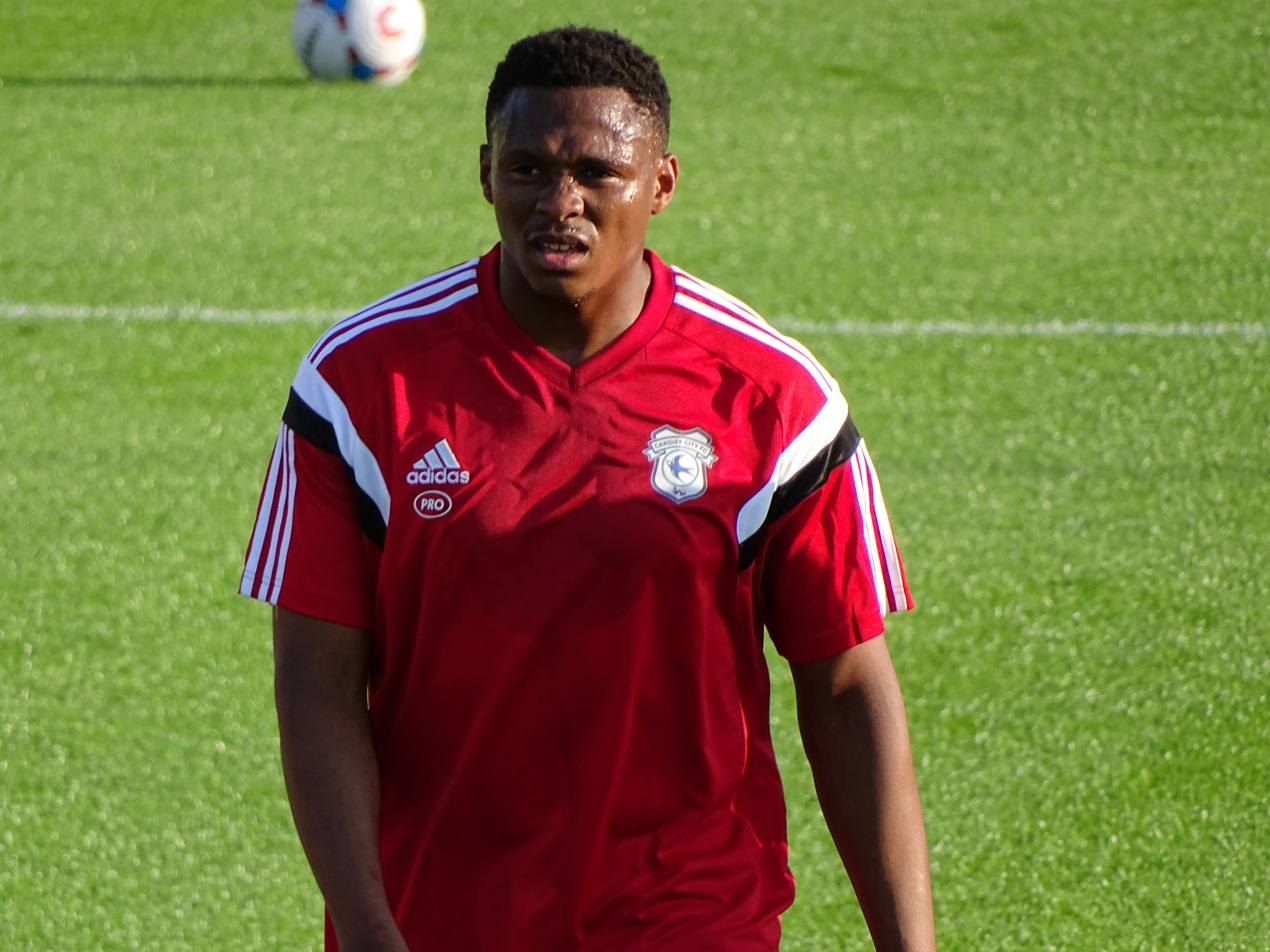
- Dikgacoi warming-up for Cardiff City in 2015

Personal information
- Full name: Kagisho Evidence Dikgacoi
- Date of birth: 24 November 1984 (age 41)
- Place of birth: Brandfort, South Africa
- Height: 1.80 m (5 ft 11 in)
- Position: Midfielder

Team information
- Current team: Witbank Spurs (Manager)

Youth career
- Cardiff Spurs

Senior career*
Years	Team	Apps	(Gls)
2004–2005	Bloemfontein Young Tigers	10	(0)
2005–2009	Golden Arrows	82	(8)
2009–2011	Fulham	14	(0)
2011	→ Crystal Palace (loan)	13	(1)
2011–2014	Crystal Palace	92	(6)
2014–2016	Cardiff City	25	(0)
2016–2017	Golden Arrows	10	(1)
Total		246	(16)

International career
2007–2013	South Africa	54	(2)

Managerial career
- 2018: Royal Eagles (assistant)
- 2019–: Witbank Spurs
- * Club domestic league appearances and goals

Kagisho Evidence Dikgacoi /diːˈxʌʃwɑː/ (born 24 November 1984) is a South African retired professional footballer who is currently the manager of Witbank Spurs. He represented South Africa at international level.

He made his international debut in 2007, and since then has earned 54 caps, scoring twice. He played at the Africa Cup of Nations in 2008 and 2013, and at the 2010 FIFA World Cup.

== Club career ==
=== Early career ===
Dikgacoi began his career at local club Cardiff Spurs, before moving to Golden Arrows in 2005 as a little-known holding midfielder from lower league side Bloemfontein Young Tigers. At Arrows, he developed into one of the country's best players in his position and was subsequently rewarded with the captain's armband.

=== Fulham ===
On 4 August 2009, Dikgacoi announced that he had reached an agreement with Fulham after a successful trial at the club. The deal was only finalised on 26 August after a work permit was granted. Dikgacoi had trained with his former club Golden Arrows while the work permit process took place in order to maintain fitness. He made his debut on 4 October, but was sent off in the 41st minute for slapping Scott Parker.

=== Crystal Palace ===
After appearing only once for Fulham under Mark Hughes in the 2010–11 season, Dikgacoi was allowed to drop down a division and join Crystal Palace in February on a loan deal until the end of the season. He scored his first goal for Crystal Palace against Cardiff on 8 March 2011, before moving permanently to the Eagles on 4 July 2011 for a fee of £600,000.

=== Cardiff City ===
On 12 June 2014, Dikgacoi signed a three-year deal with Cardiff City after refusing a new deal with Crystal Palace. He made his debut in a 1–0 loss to Wolverhampton Wanderers, coming on for Aron Gunnarsson on 23 August. His full debut came three days later in the League Cup, where Cardiff beat Port Vale. Following a series of niggling of injuries, Dikgacoi was ruled out for four months with a knee injury in November.

Dikgacoi did not return until the following season, where he started on the opening day against Fulham. He made 25 appearances during the season as Cardiff missed out on the play-offs, before his contract was terminated by mutual consent on 26 August.

=== Golden Arrows ===
In October 2016, Dikgacoi returned to former club Lamontville Golden Arrows after training with the team. He signed a short-term deal. As a result of injuries and weight issues, he played in just ten matches and failed to complete a match. The Golden Arrows announced in June 2017 that he would not return for the following season.

Dikgacoi announced his retirement from playing in July 2018.

== International career ==
Dikgacoi made his debut for the South Africa national team on 27 May 2007, in a COSAFA Cup match against Mauritius. He scored his first two goals on 7 June 2008, in a 2010 World Cup qualifier against Equatorial Guinea, which ended 4–1. He was part of Bafana Bafana's 2008 African Nations Cup squad and was also a participant at the 2009 FIFA Confederations Cup, 2010 FIFA World Cup and 2013 African Cup of Nations, held in his home country.

== Post-playing career ==
Following his retirement from playing football Dikgacoi entered the business arena alongside his business partner Tieho Benny Mokhalinyane. In 2018, his apparel company International Sports Apparel Design Institute concluded a deal with the Football Association of Malawi for the supply of kits, tracksuits, and golf shirts.

== Career statistics ==
=== Club ===
As of match played 9 May 2016

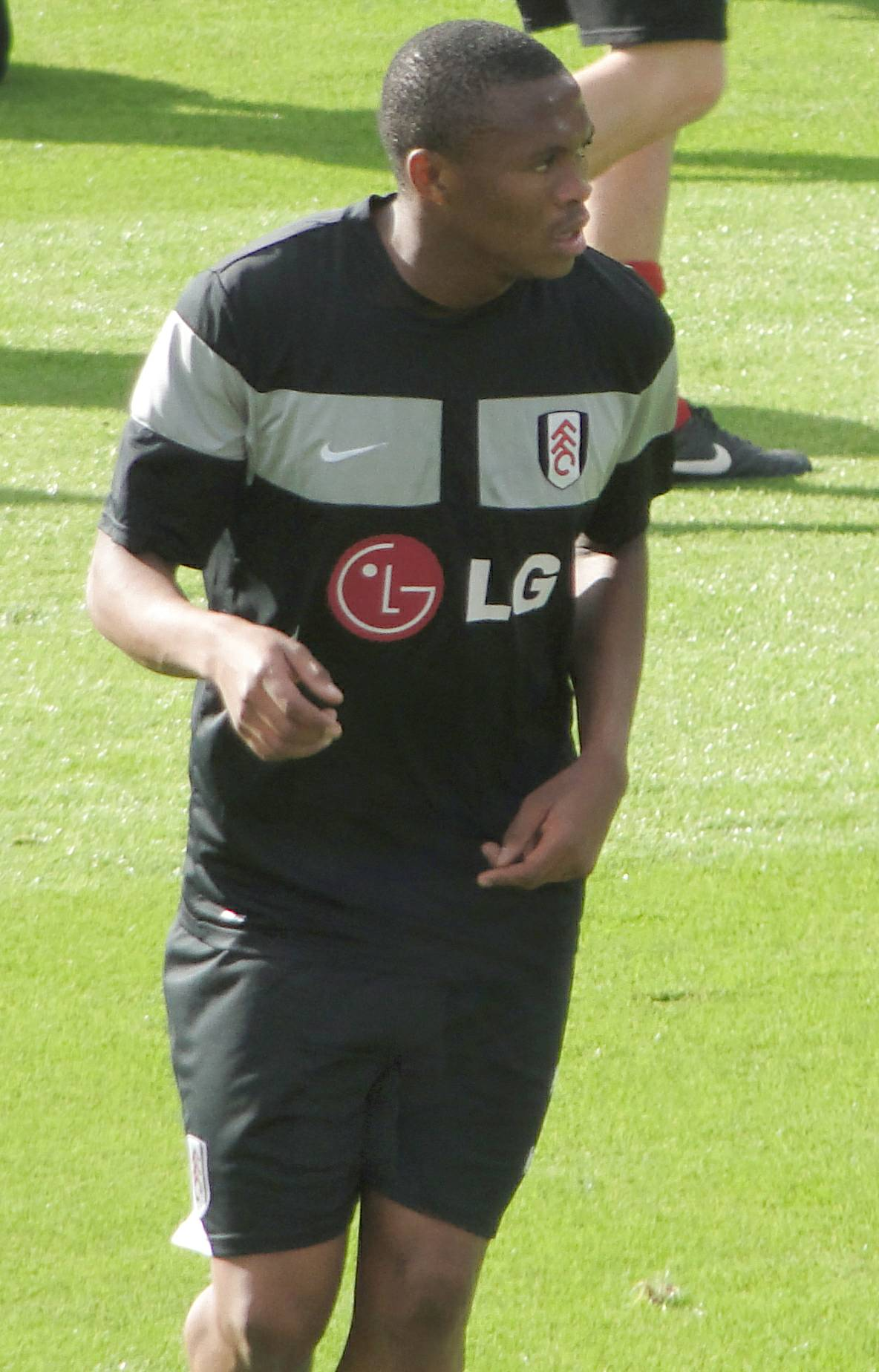
Dikgacoi warming up before his debut game with Fulham in 2009

Appearances and goals by club, season and competition
Club	Season	League			National Cup		League Cup		Total	
Club	Season	Division	Apps	Goals	Apps	Goals	Apps	Goals	Apps	Goals
Golden Arrows	2006–07	ABSA Premiership	25	0	0	0	0	0	25	0
Golden Arrows	2007–08	ABSA Premiership	23	4	0	0	0	0	23	4
Golden Arrows	2008–09	ABSA Premiership	25	4	0	0	0	0	25	4
Golden Arrows	Total		73	8	0	0	0	0	73	8
Fulham	2009–10	Premier League	12	0	2	0	1	0	15	0
Fulham	2010–11	Premier League	1	0	0	0	0	0	1	0
Fulham	Total		13	0	2	0	1	0	16	0
Crystal Palace	2010–11	Championship	13	1	0	0	0	0	13	1
Crystal Palace	2011–12	Championship	27	2	4	0	0	0	31	2
Crystal Palace	2012–13	Championship	42	4	0	0	1	1	43	5
Crystal Palace	2013–14	Premier League	26	0	1	0	0	0	27	0
Crystal Palace	Total		108	7	5	0	1	1	114	8
Cardiff City	2014–15	Championship	2	0	0	0	1	0	3	0
Cardiff City	2015–16	Championship	23	0	1	0	1	0	25	0
Cardiff City	Total		25	0	1	0	2	0	28	0
Career total			219	15	8	0	4	1	231	16

=== International goals ===
Scores and results list South Africa's goal tally first, score column indicates score after each Dikgacoi goal.

List of international goals scored by Kagisho Dikgacoi
No.	Date	Venue	Opponent	Score	Result	Competition
1	7 June 2008	Atteridgeville, South Africa	Equatorial Guinea	1–0	4–1	2010 FIFA World Cup qualification
2	7 June 2008	Atteridgeville, South Africa	Equatorial Guinea	4–1	4–1	2010 FIFA World Cup qualification

== Honours ==
Crystal Palace

- Football League Championship play-offs: 2013
