= Ibra Sekajja =

Ugandan footballer (born 1992)

Personal information
- Date of birth: 31 October 1992 (age 34)
- Place of birth: Mulago, Uganda
- Height: 1.80 m (5 ft 11 in)
- Position: Forward

Youth career
- 2007–2011: Crystal Palace

Senior career*
Years	Team	Apps	(Gls)
2011–2014	Crystal Palace	2	(1)
2011	→ Kettering Town (loan)	2	(0)
2011–2012	→ Bromley (loan)	5	(0)
2012–2013	→ Milton Keynes Dons (loan)	1	(0)
2013	→ Barnet (loan)	4	(0)
2014	Inverness Caledonian Thistle	4	(0)
2015	Livingston	11	(2)
2015–2016	Braintree Town	2	(0)
2016	Hemel Hempstead Town	14	(2)
2016–2017	Dulwich Hamlet	35	(12)
2017–2018	Bognor Regis Town	29	(7)
2018–2019	Havant & Waterlooville	14	(0)
2019	Gosport Borough	6	(2)
2019	Maidenhead United	4	(1)
2021–2022	Dulwich Hamlet	17	(5)
2022	AC Oulu	8	(2)
2023–2024	Welling United	2	(0)
2025–	Raynes Park Vale	0	(0)

International career
2007	England U16	1	(0)
- * Club domestic league appearances and goals as of 18:29, 2 December 2025 (UTC)

Ibra Sekajja (born 31 October 1992) is a Ugandan professional footballer who plays as a forward for Isthmian League South Central Division club Raynes Park Vale.

== Club career ==
Born in Uganda, he attended secondary school at Ashburton Community School from 2004 to 2009.

Ibra was first noticed by a scout from Crystal Palace, a Premier League club, for his footballing talent whilst playing during a match at Elmwood Primary School. His pace, technical skill, dribbling, height and striking were noticed at the age of 10.

Sekajja made his professional debut for Crystal Palace on 30 April 2011, in a fixture at Hull City. He scored a late 88th-minute equaliser with his first touch. Sekajja had dominated the pitch in the last few vital minutes of the match, ensuring a draw against Hull which secured Palace's safety in the Championship. He celebrated with a triple backflip.

He was loaned to Kettering Town and Bromley midway through the 2011–12 season, to gain first team experience.
Milton Keynes Dons then signed Sekajja on loan on 7 November 2012. Manager Karl Robinson said of the move, "He's exactly what we need in the team at the moment – he is young, fearless and fast." On 24 November 2012, he made his only appearance for the side, coming on as an 84th-minute substitute for Dean Bowditch in a 5–1 win against Colchester United

On 10 January 2013, Sekajja joined Barnet on a one-month loan. He made a winning start to his Barnet career, playing the whole game in an away 2–0 win against Rotherham United, on 12 January 2013. Following his "impressive" debut, manager Edgar Davids said "I expect that he is going to be a great asset for the team. I hope he develops himself in the line that I think he can and he can become an important player for Barnet."

At the end of his loan at Barnet, Sekajja returned to Crystal Palace but failed to feature again in the first team. He was eventually released by the club in May 2014.

After a successful two-week trial, Sekajja signed for Scottish Premiership club Inverness Caledonian Thistle in October 2014. He made his debut for the team later that month, coming on as a substitute against St Mirren. Sekajja left Inverness in January 2015, at the end of his short-term contract.

On 16 January 2015, Sekajja signed for Scottish Championship club Livingston.

Following spells with Braintree Town and Hemel Hempstead Town during the 2015–16 season, Sekajja joined Dulwich Hamlet of the Isthmian League Premier Division, making his debut in a 2–2 away draw with Enfield Town on 1 October 2016. He finished his first season at the club scoring 17 goals in all competitions, including a first-half hat-trick against Enfield Town in the Isthmian League Premier Division play-off semi-final. After 12 league goals for Dulwich in 2016–17, he joined Bognor Regis Town for 2017–18. In 2018-19 Sekajja played for Havant & Waterlooville before joining Gosport Borough in March.

Sekajja joined Maidenhead United in November 2019. In January 2020, he went on trial at Grimsby Town.

Sekajja re-joined Dulwich Hamlet in January 2021.

On 15 August 2022, he signed with AC Oulu in Finland until the end of the season.

On 1 December 2025, Sekajja joined Isthmian League South Central Division club Raynes Park Vale.

== International career ==
Sekajja has been capped by England at U16 level. In August 2013, he was called up to the Uganda squad for a friendly against Egypt. He did not play as he had yet to receive his Ugandan passport.

== Career statistics ==
As of match played 2 October 2022

Appearances and goals by club, season and competition
Club	Season	League			National cup		League cup		Other		Total	
Club	Season	Division	Apps	Goals	Apps	Goals	Apps	Goals	Apps	Goals	Apps	Goals
Crystal Palace	2010–11	Championship	1	1	0	0	0	0	0	0	1	1
Crystal Palace	2011–12	Championship	1	0	1	0	0	0	0	0	2	0
Crystal Palace	2012–13	Championship	0	0	0	0	0	0	0	0	0	0
Crystal Palace	2013–14	Premier League	0	0	0	0	0	0	0	0	0	0
Crystal Palace	Total		2	1	1	0	0	0	0	0	3	1
Kettering Town (loan)	2011–12	Conference Premier	2	0	0	0	0	0	0	0	2	0
Bromley (loan)	2011–12	Conference South	3	0	0	0	0	0	1 (Note: One appearance in the London Senior Cup)	0	4	0
Milton Keynes Dons (loan)	2012–13	League One	1	0	0	0	0	0	0	0	1	0
Barnet (loan)	2012–13	League Two	4	0	0	0	0	0	0	0	4	0
Inverness Caledonian Thistle	2014–15	Scottish Premiership	4	0	0	0	0	0	0	0	4	0
Livingston	2014–15	Scottish Championship	11	2	0	0	0	0	0	0	11	2
Braintree Town	2015–16	National League	2	0	1	0	0	0	2 (Note: One appearance in the FA Trophy; one appearance in the Essex Senior Cup)	0	5	0
Hemel Hempstead Town	2015–16	National League South	14	2	0	0	0	0	1 (Note: One appearance in the Herts Senior Cup)	0	15	2
Dulwich Hamlet	2016–17	Isthmian League Premier Division	35	12	0	0	0	0	15 (Note: Nine appearances in the FA Trophy; four appearances, one goal in the Alan Turvey Trophy; two appearances, three goals in the Isthmian League Premier Division play-offs)	4	50	16
Bognor Regis Town	2017–18	National League South	29	7	1	0	0	0	5 (Note: Four appearances, three goals in the FA Trophy; one appearance in the Sussex Senior Challenge Cup)	3	35	10
Havant & Waterlooville	2018–19	National League	14	0	1	0	0	0	5 (Note: One appearance in the FA Trophy; one appearance, two goals in the Hampshire Senior Cup; three appearances, two goals in the Portsmouth Senior Cup)	4	20	4
Gosport Borough	2018–19	SFL Premier Division South	6	2	0	0	0	0	0	0	6	2
Maidenhead United	2019–20	National League	4	1	0	0	0	0	1 (Note: One appearance in the Berks & Bucks Senior Cup)	0	5	1
Dulwich Hamlet	2020–21	National League South	1	0	0	0	0	0	0	0	1	0
Dulwich Hamlet	2021–22	National League South	11	5	0	0	0	0	0	0	11	5
Dulwich Hamlet	Total		12	5	0	0	0	0	0	0	12	5
AC Oulu	2022	Veikkausliiga	8	2	0	0	0	0	0	0	8	2
Career total			151	34	4	0	0	0	30	11	185	45
