= Bayan Mahmud =

Ghanaian footballer (born 1994)

Bayan Mahmud (born 15 December 1994) is a Ghanaian former footballer who played as a forward.

== Career ==
As a youth player, Mahmud joined the youth academy of Argentine side Boca. In 2015, he signed for French side Blanc-Mesnil. In 2018, he signed for French side SAS Épinal.
