= Nejc Praprotnik =

Slovenian footballer (born 1993)

Personal information
- Full name: Nejc Praprotnik
- Date of birth: 17 January 1993 (age 33)
- Place of birth: Slovenia
- Position: Attacking midfielder

Youth career
- Idrija
- –2007: Bilje
- 2007–2011: Gorica
- 2011–2012: Atalanta

Senior career*
Years	Team	Apps	(Gls)
2010–2011	Gorica	4	(0)
2011–2013	Atalanta	0	(0)
2012–2013	→ Gorica (loan)	23	(3)
2013–2015	Livingston	14	(0)

International career
2010	Slovenia U18	2	(0)
2011–2012	Slovenia U19	15	(1)
2011–2013	Slovenia U20	3	(0)
2013	Slovenia U21	3	(0)
- * Club domestic league appearances and goals as of 24 July 2016

Nejc Praprotnik (born 17 January 1993) is a Slovenian footballer who plays as an attacking midfielder.

== Career ==
Praprotnik began his career with youth categories at Idrija, before moving to Gorica. In August 2010, he was on a trial at Manchester City, but nothing came of it. On 11 September 2010, Praprotnik made his professional debut for Gorica, in a 2–1 home win against Triglav Kranj.

In January 2011, Praprotnik signed a contract with Italian Serie A club Atalanta, but remained with Gorica on loan until the end of the season. In July, he travelled to Bergamo. He then played a full season for the club's youth squad.

In September 2012, Praprotnik returned to Gorica, in a loan basis. He scored his first and second professional goals on 20 October 2012, in a 4–1 home win against Aluminij.

On 26 October 2013 Praprotnik was an unused substitute for Livingston in their Scottish Championship match against Dundee. It was later revealed that he had been on trial with the club but hadn't been officially unveiled as signed. He made his debut on 15 March 2014, coming on as a first-half substitute in a 2–0 home loss against Dundee.
