= Bayan Khatib =

Syrian-Canadian activist and humanitarian

Bayan Khatib is a Canada-based former refugee from Syria, who founded the Syrian Canadian Foundation. Khatib is known as a spokesperson, activist, and commentator on the Syria war.

== Early life ==
Bayan Khatib was born in Syria shortly before her parents fled to USA as refugees, and was initially raised by her grandparents in Syria.

In 1986, at the age of seven, Bayan Khatib moved to Denver to rejoin her nuclear family, who she hardly knew. She had a challenging transition initially as her parents were still dealing with the emotional trauma of their experiences in Syria. Later the family moved to Toronto.

== Career ==
In 2011, in the context of the Syria conflict, Khatib worked as a spokesperson for the political opposition in Syria.

In Toronto, she worked as a media relations officer trying to increase public awareness of the Syria war.

In 2015, as Syrian refugees were arriving in Canada, Khatib founded the Syrian Canadian Foundation to provide support services for newcomers to Canada.

Khatib also worked as the director of communications for the Al-Qazzaz Foundation.

In 2018, she reacted to the airstrikes on Syria by saying that Syrians felt a mixture of optimism that it would curtail President Assad, and fear of civilian casualties. She pushed the Government of Canada to do more to end the conflict in Syria.

In 2021, she organized deliveries of essential items to newcomers.
