= Lina Attel =

Jordanian actor (born 1960)

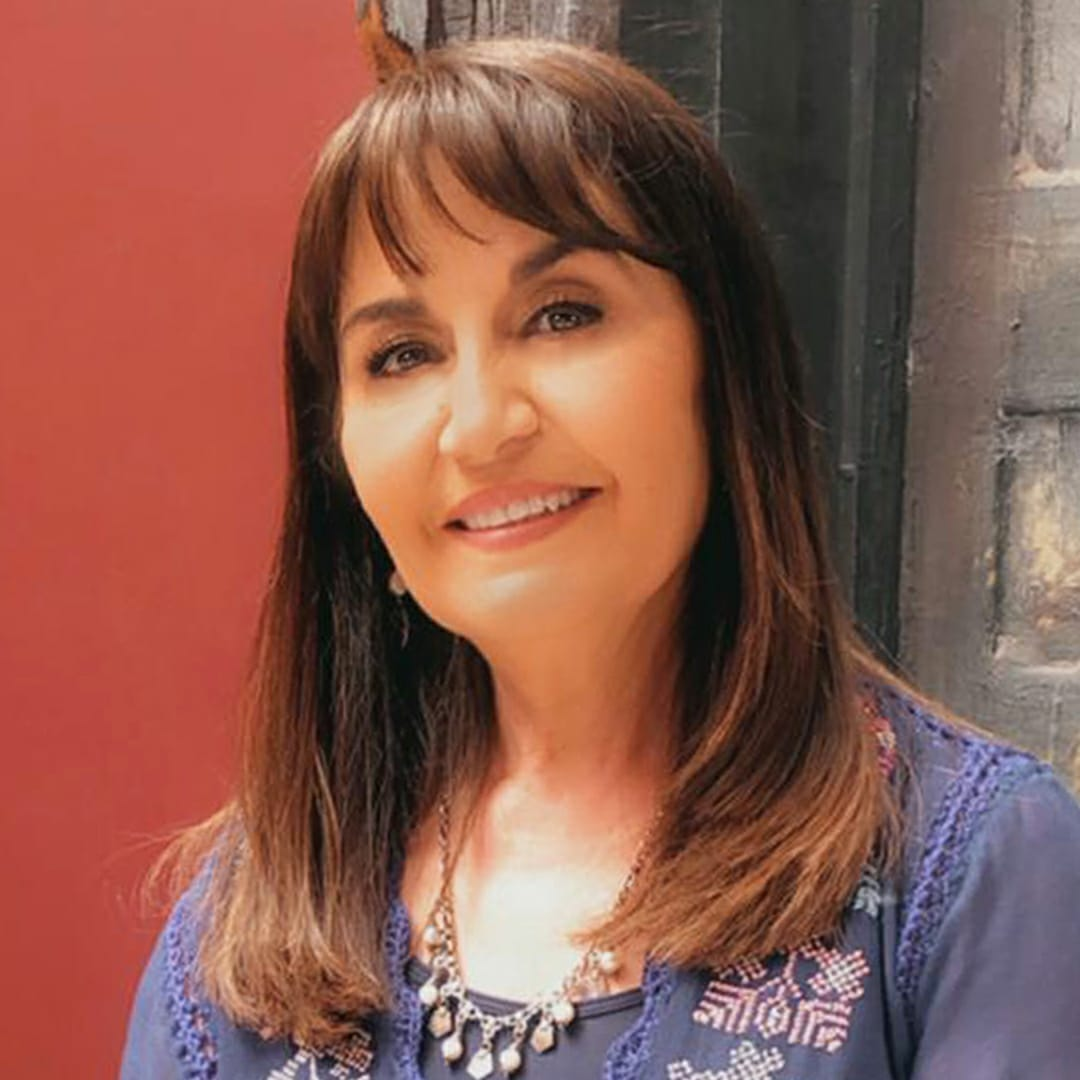
- Lina Attel

Personal details
- Born: 1960 (age 65–66) Irbid, Jordan
- Parent: Ahmad Youssef Al Tal (father)
- Education: Yarmouk University

Lina Attel (born 1960) is a Jordanian actor known for cross-gender acting and for co founding the National Center for Culture and Arts of the King Hussein Foundation since 1987.

== Early life and education ==
Lina Attel was born in Irbid. Her father is the academic, educator and cultural attaché Ahmad Youssef Al Tal. Attel studied acting at the Webber Douglas Academy of Dramatic Art in London, graduating in 1980, and Business Administration and English Literature at Yarmouk University, from which she graduated in 1983. She as a MA degree from University of South Wales in theatre in education.

== Career ==
Attel started her acting career in 1982, with television and theatre roles in Jordan. She appeared in AlManahel educational children's TV program in 1987. She was Theatre and Drama in Education Specialist at Jordan Ministry of Education.

Attel founded the National Center for Culture & Arts (NCCA), King Hussein Foundation in 1987, and has served as director general of the center since then. She has been the Director of the Annual International Arab Youth Congress since 1994, the Secretary General of the Jordan chapter of the UNESCO organisation International Theatre Institute (ITI), and the President of the International Association of Theater for Children & Young People ASSITEJ since 2004.

She taught drama in education at the University of Jordan and other institutions from 1998 until 2004.

== Awards ==
Attel was shortlisted for the 2017 Gilder/Coigney International Theatre Award, organized by League of Professional Theatre Women (LPTW) in New York.

• Distinguished Achievement in Performing Arts, Yarmouk University Alumni Club, 2014

• Outstanding Performance & Contribution to Tourism Jordan Award by Jordan Tourism Board, for the Musical "Petra Rocks", 2009 The Ministry of Culture

• Al Hussein Medal of Distinction in the First Order, awarded for Outstanding Achievement in Performing Arts, 2000

• International Prize Grozdanin Kikot, from the Center for Drama Education, Mostar Theater, Bosnia & Herzegovina -Contribution to the Development of Drama Education, 2000

• Silver Award for Musical "Madinat Assawsana", from Cairo International Television & Radio Festival, 1997 Award for Unique Outstanding Services to Arab Children, by Higher Council for Children, UAE, 1997

== Filmography ==
=== Television ===
==== Actress ====
Title	Year	Role	Refs
Ganbare Genki	1980	Hanan	
Tarfah ibn Al-Abd	1982	Salma	
Byar AlTay	1984		
Athab	1985		
Jorouh	1986	Noufa	
AlManahel	1987	Several roles	
Magader	1988		

=== Theatre ===
==== Actress ====
Title	Year	Role	Refs
Alf Hyaka wa Hykaya fi Souk Okaz/	1985		

==== Director ====
Title	Year	Role	Refs
Petra Rocks	2009		
