= Bayan Fenwick =

English footballer

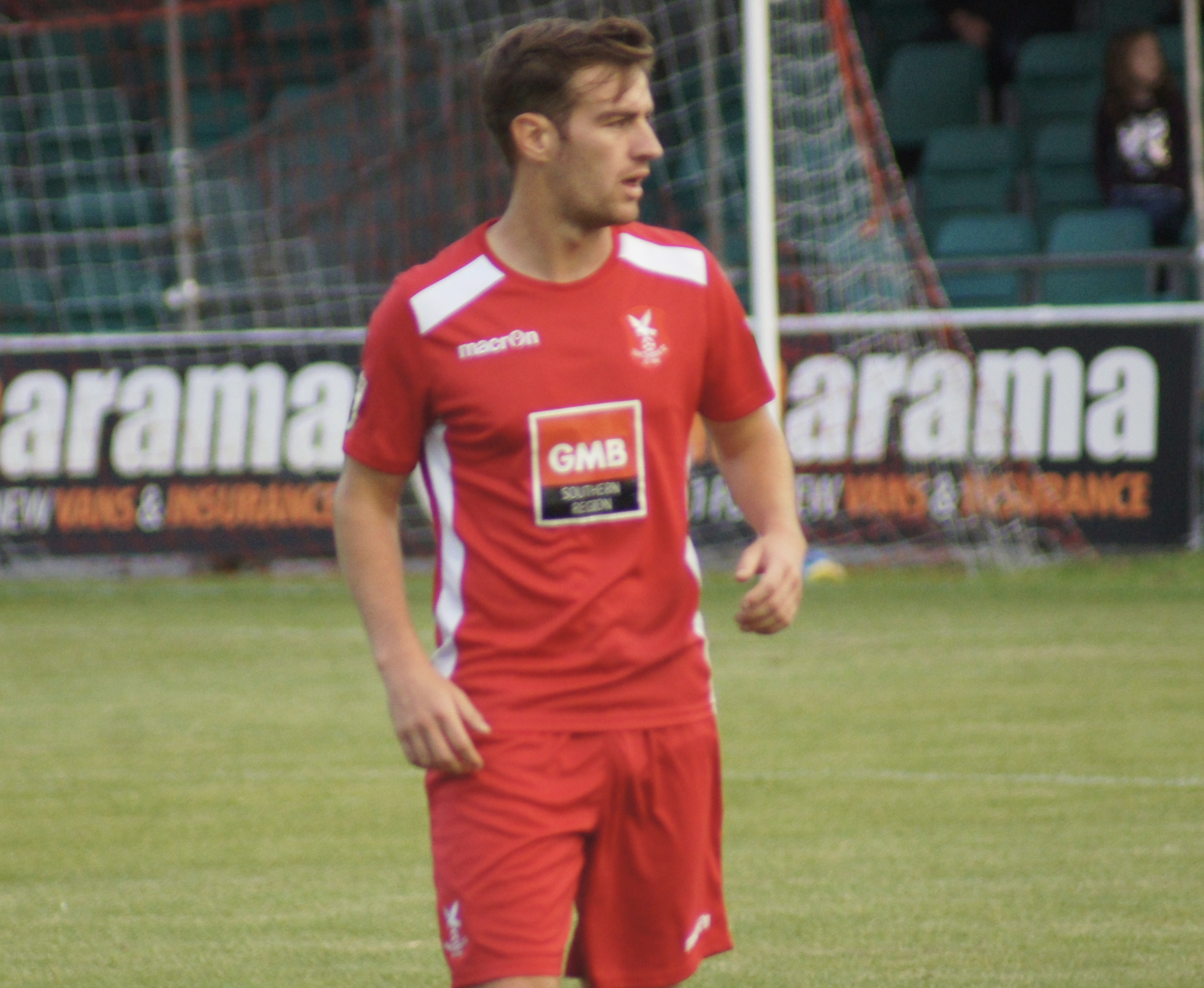
- Fenwick playing for Whitehawk 2017

Personal information
- Full name: Bayan Fenwick
- Date of birth: 16 November 1993 (age 32)
- Place of birth: Eastbourne, East Sussex, England
- Position: Forward

Team information
- Current team: AB Tårnby

Youth career
- 2011–2012: Lewes
- 2012: Crystal Palace

Senior career*
Years	Team	Apps	(Gls)
2012–2013	Crystal Palace	0	(0)
2013	→ Eastbourne Borough (loan)	4	(0)
2013–2014	Three Bridges		
2014–2015	Bishops Stortford	1	(0)
2015	Peacehaven & Telscombe		
2015–2016	Torquay United	7	(0)
2016	Truro City		
2016	Selkirk	6	(4)
2017	Whitehawk	10	(0)
2018	FC Sydvest 05	13	(2)
2019–2020	Jammerbugt	11	(1)
2020–2021	Brønshøj	22	(10)
2021–2022	FA 2000	8	(0)
2022–	AB Tårnby	0	(0)
- * Club domestic league appearances and goals as of 09:39, 4 February 2022 (UTC)

Bayan Fenwick (born 16 November 1993) is an English footballer who plays as a forward for AB Tårnby.

== Career ==
Fenwick played football for St. Bede's School, where he was in the six-a-side team that won the ISFA National Six-a-Side Tournament. He then played for the Lewes U18 team in a side that included Solly March, scoring 18 times in 11 games and earning a trial at Crystal Palace where he scored for their youth team in a match against Norwich City.

On 1 March 2012, he signed for Crystal Palace as a second year scholar and in August 2012 played for the first team in a pre-season friendly against Aldershot Town, although his manager Dougie Freedman said he was unlikely to make it into the first team that season. Fenwick played 12 games for Palace's Under-21 team in the 2012–13 season, scoring three goals, with four assists. He also played on loan at Eastbourne Borough. In June 2013, Fenwick was one of six academy players released by Palace following their promotion to the Premier League.

Fenwick spent a short time training with Cardiff City and played 5 games for the U21 side. He then signed for Lewes, before joining Peacehaven & Telscombe in February 2015, being sent off on his debut against Lewes.

Fenwick joined Torquay United on 23 July 2015 having played with them in pre-season. He was released by Torquay in December 2015 and then spent a short time at Truro City, appearing once in the FA Trophy against Macclesfield Town, before joining Selkirk of the Scottish Football Lowland League in February 2016.

Fenwick started the 2017–18 pre-season back in East Sussex on trial at Brighton-based National League South side Whitehawk, earning a deal after scoring a 35-yard screamer against Burgess Hill Town. After starting six games and making four appearances from the bench, Fenwick asked to be released from his contract after Steve King took over as manager.

=== Denmark ===
In March 2018, Fenwick joined Danish 2nd Division side FC Sydvest.

On 1 February 2019, Fenwick joined fellow Danish 2nd Division Jammerbugt.

On 28 July 2020, Fenwick signed for Brønshøj on a one-year deal. After one season, he left to join Hillerød Fodbold.
