= Bayan Tal =

Jordanian media specialist (born 1962)

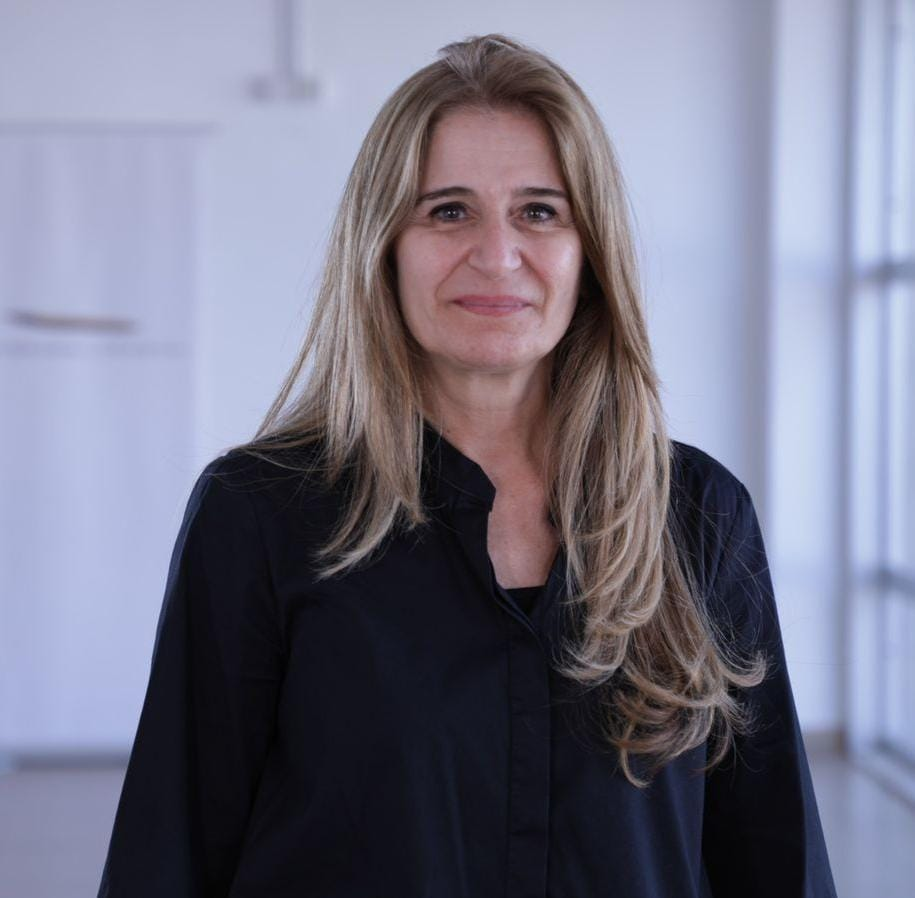

Personal details
- Born: 1 August 1962 (age 64) Tafilah, Jordan
- Spouse: Mohammed Bataineh
- Children: 3
- Parent: Ahmad Youssef Al Tal (father)
- Education: University of Jordan
- Occupation: Journalist, Anchor, Media Literacy Specialist

Bayan Tal (born 1 August 1962) is a Jordanian journalist and media professional known for her work in broadcast journals,. government communications, and media and information literacy. She has held leadership positions in Jordan media and government and has contributed to efforts to promote media and information literacy in Jordan. Most of her career was focused on supporting and empowering a new generation of young journalists and students with the skills they need to advance their careers and support their rights and freedoms.

== Early life ==
Bayan Tal was born in Tafilah in early August of 1962. Her father, Ahmad Youseff Al Tal, was an academic and educator whole also serced as Cultural Attaché at the Embassy of The Hashemite Kingdom in Pakistan. During his diplomatic appointment in Pakistan, Tal attended school there after beginning her education in Jordan. She later attended the University of Jordan, where she earned a Bachelor of Arts in English and minored in French Literature.

== Career ==
Tal began her career at age 17 at JRTVC at Jordan Radio and Television Corporation where she worked as a broadcast journalist and news anchor. Over the 25 years she was at the organization she held several positions, including the head of the English news section and assistant director general for development affairs. She later worked in government communications and was the director of international media relations before returning to JRTVC as its first female director general in 2010.

In 2005, Bayan Tal was tasked with establishing the Government Communications Department at the Prime Ministry of Jordan. She was also a part of a team that drafted the National Agenda, a ten-year reform program for the country, In 2006 she moved to the Royal Hashemite Court, where she served as director of international media and communication fro King Abdullah II for five years.

In November 2010, Tal was appointed director general of JRTVC, becoming the first woman to hold the positions. Her appointment marked a return of the broadcasting organization where she had spent much of her earlier career. Tal later became a senior advisor at the Jordan Media Institute where she led its Media and Information Literacy (MIL) program for six years. The program focused on integrating media and information literacy into schools and unovirsitues and engaging different sectors of Jordaian society. She also worked with a team at the National Center for Curriculum Development to integrate media and information literacy into Jordanian school textbooks.

== Personal life ==
Bayan Tal is married and has one daughter and two sons.

== Relevant articles and contributions ==
- Tal, Bayan (April 20, 2020). "In Crisis: Jordan Battles COVID-19 and Misinformation". www.wilsoncenter.org.
- Tal, Bayan (2017-11-05). "Critical minds for critical times". Jordan Times.
