= Sam Magri =

Maltese footballer (born 1994)

Personal information
- Full name: Samuel James Magri
- Date of birth: 30 March 1994 (age 32)
- Place of birth: Portsmouth, England
- Height: 1.85 m (6 ft 1 in)
- Positions: Right back; centre back

Team information
- Current team: Sholing

Youth career
- –2012: Portsmouth

Senior career*
Years	Team	Apps	(Gls)
2012	Portsmouth	0	(0)
2012–2014	Queens Park Rangers	0	(0)
2014	→ Nuneaton Town (loan)	4	(0)
2014–2015	Crystal Palace	0	(0)
2015–2017	Dover Athletic	86	(1)
2017–2019	Ebbsfleet United	75	(2)
2019–2023	Havant & Waterlooville	55	(7)
2023	→ Bognor Regis Town (loan)	10	(0)
2023–2025	AFC Totton	75	(7)
2025	Bracknell Town	8	(0)
2025–	Sholing	30	(2)

International career^{‡}
2009–2010	England U16	7	(0)
2010–2011	England U17	22	(2)
2011	England U18	1	(0)
2012	England U19	1	(0)
2015–2016	Malta U21	4	(0)
2016–2017	Malta	7	(0)
- * Club domestic league appearances and goals as of 22:35, 4 August 2026 (UTC) ‡ National team caps and goals as of 19:22, 5 July 2018 (UTC)

Samuel John Magri (born 30 March 1994) is a professional footballer who plays as a right back or centre back for Sholing. Born in England, he represents the Malta national team.

== Club career ==
=== Portsmouth ===
Born in Portsmouth, England, Magri joined Portsmouth as a youth player and moved up through the ranks in the academy. In the 2011–12 season he was involved in several first-team squads. He was an unused substitute in games against Southampton and Millwall.

In February 2012, Magri had a trial at Liverpool, but a deal was not reached. In his next season, he finally made his professional debut, starting in a League Cup match against Plymouth Argyle on 14 August 2012.

=== Queens Park Rangers ===
On 30 August 2012, Magri signed a two-year professional contract with Queens Park Rangers, after being released by Portsmouth.

Magri played in the QPR youth and reserve team but never made a senior appearance, to get first team football QPR sought to find a club for him to go out on loan to. On 14 March 2014, Magri joined Conference Premier club Nuneaton Town on loan for the remainder of the 2013–14 season. Magri made his debut the day after joining in a 2–2 draw away to Aldershot Town. He went on to make 4 appearances in a Nuneaton shirt. However, upon returning to his parent club, Magri was released by the club, leaving after failing to appear in a single game for QPR's first team.

=== Crystal Palace ===
Following his release by Queens Park Rangers, Magri joined Crystal Palace on trial in July 2014. He impressed enough to secure a one-month contract in August, and joined the under-21 squad.

After several contract extensions, Magri left the club after his deal expired in June 2015, without a first team appearance.

=== Dover Athletic ===
On 20 July 2015, Magri signed with Dover Athletic after impressing on a trial.

He made his debut for the club on 8 August 2015, starting in a 1–2 away loss against Barrow. Despite missing out two matches, due to international commitment, Magri set a goal for Ricky Miller to score the winning goal, in a 1–0 win over Tranmere Rovers on 31 October 2015. Magri quickly established as a starter at Dover, and appeared in 45 league games during the 2015–16 season. For his performance, Magri was Team of the Year by a local newspaper Kent Online.

In the 2016–17 season, Magri continued to be in a first team regular at the club and started the season well for them when he scored his first goal for the club on 20 August 2016, netting the third in a 3–1 home win against the same opponent he made his debut against. After missing one match due to international commitment, Magri returned to the first team when he provided two assists, in a 6–1 victory over Braintree Town on 22 October 2016.

=== Ebbsfleet United ===
On 30 June 2017, Magri signed for Ebbsfleet United.

=== Havant & Waterlooville ===
In July 2019, Magri signed for National League South side Havant & Waterlooville.

On 28 January 2023, Magri joined Isthmian League club Bognor Regis Town on a dual registration deal.

=== AFC Totton ===
Having been offered a new contract by Havant, Magri instead opted to sign for Southern League Premier Division South club AFC Totton in May 2023.

=== Bracknell Town ===
In August 2025, Magri joined Southern League Premier Division South club Bracknell Town. He left in October 2025 after eight appearances.

== International career ==
Magri made his debut for the England U-16 team against Wales on 15 October 2009 and he captained the U16 side to victory shield during the campaign in 2009. He continued moving up the age groups during the 2010–11 season playing 22 times for the England U17s including the 2011 FIFA U-17 World Cup in Mexico. He made his debut for the under 18s versus Slovakia on 16 November 2011.

Sam Magri is also eligible to represent the Maltese national team, due to his Maltese grandfather. In June 2011, Magri quoted to The Times of Malta that he would consider playing for Malta if the opportunity arose in future. In September 2012 shortly after making his senior debut for Portsmouth and moving to QPR, Magri made his debut for Noel Blake's England U-19 side, in a 6–0 win against the Faroe Island in Tallinn. A couple of days later he was an unused sub in an Under 19's match against Ukraine, this was Magri's last involvement for the Under 19's squad.

Magri acquired his Maltese passport in August 2015, being eligible to play for the country through his grandfather. After being called up by the Malta U-21, He made his debut for the U21 side on 9 October 2015 in a match against Belgium U-21. After being called up for the first time, Magri debuted for the senior national team in a 2018 World Cup qualification loss to Slovenia on 11 November 2016. Magri then made his second appearance for Malta on 15 November 2016 against Iceland, which saw them lose 2–0.

== Career statistics ==
=== Club ===
As of match played 10 March 2018

Appearances and goals by club, season and competition
Club	Season	League			FA Cup		League Cup		Other		Total	
Club	Season	Division	Apps	Goals	Apps	Goals	Apps	Goals	Apps	Goals	Apps	Goals
Portsmouth	2011–12	Championship	0	0	0	0	0	0	—		0	0
Portsmouth	2012–13	League One	0	0	—		1	0	—		1	0
Portsmouth	Total		0	0	0	0	1	0	—		1	0
Queens Park Rangers	2012–13	Premier League	0	0	0	0	0	0	—		0	0
Queens Park Rangers	2013–14	Championship	0	0	0	0	0	0	—		0	0
Queens Park Rangers	Total		0	0	0	0	0	0	—		0	0
Nuneaton Town (loan)	2013–14	Conference Premier	4	0	—		—		—		4	0
Crystal Palace	2014–15	Premier League	0	0	0	0	0	0	—		0	0
Dover Athletic	2015–16	National League	43	0	0	0	—		7 (Note: Five appearances in FA Trophy, two in National League play-offs)	0	50	0
Dover Athletic	2016–17	National League	43	1	3	0	—		2 (Note: Appearances in FA Trophy)	0	48	1
Dover Athletic	Total		86	1	3	0	—		9	0	98	1
Ebbsfleet United	2017–18	National League	33	0	3	0	—		3	0	39	0
Career total			123	1	6	0	1	0	12	0	142	1

=== International ===
As of match played 7 September 2017

Appearances and goals by national team and year
National team	Year	Apps	Goals
Malta	2016	2	0
Malta	2017	5	0
Total		7	0
