= Joel Ward (footballer) =

English footballer (1989)

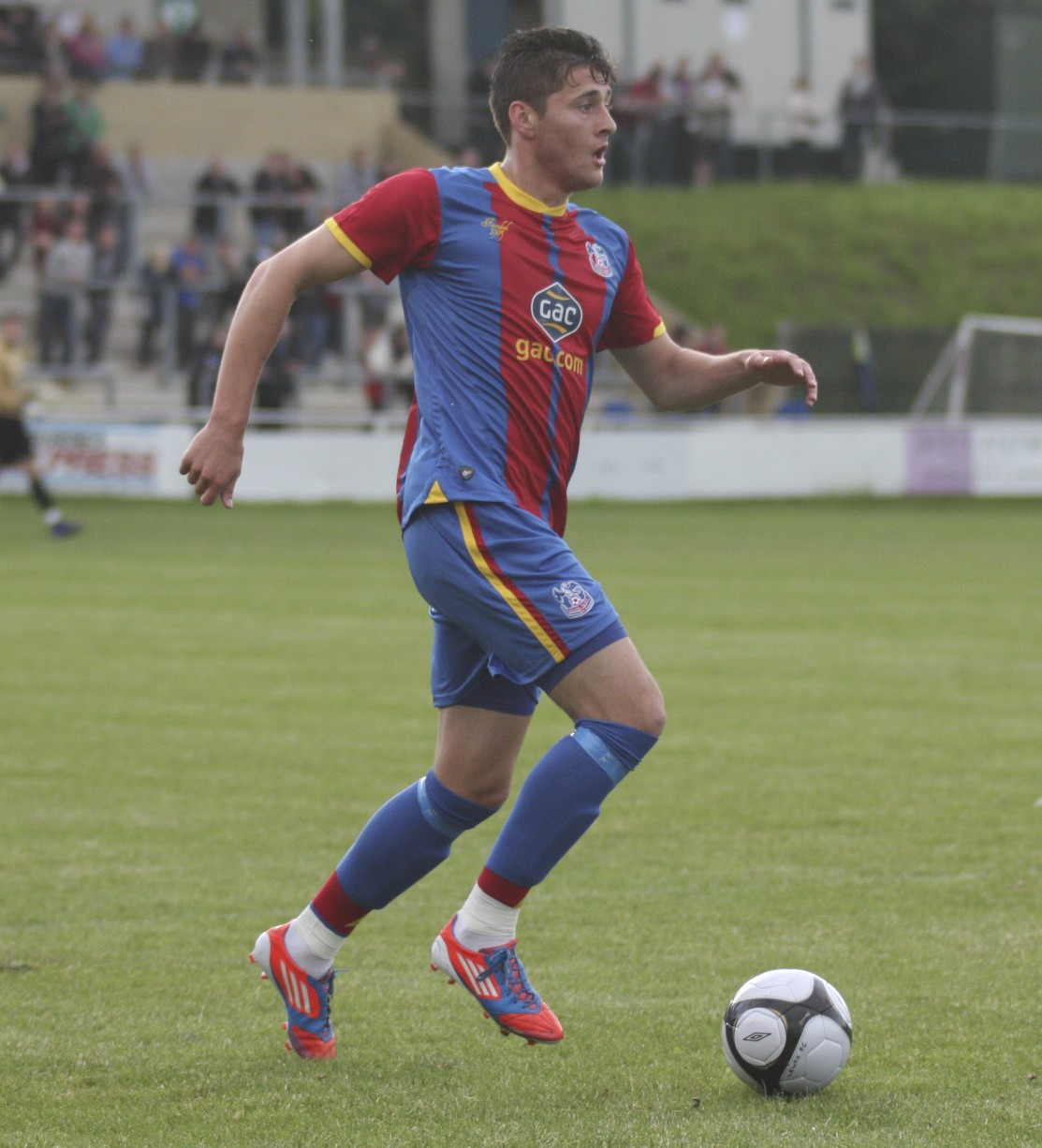
- Ward playing for Crystal Palace in 2012

Personal information
- Full name: Joel Edward Philip Ward
- Date of birth: 29 October 1989 (age 37)
- Place of birth: Emsworth, England
- Height: 6 ft 2 in (1.88 m)
- Positions: Right-back; centre-back

Youth career
- 1998–2006: East Lodge
- 2006–2008: Portsmouth

Senior career*
Years	Team	Apps	(Gls)
2008–2012	Portsmouth	89	(6)
2008–2009	→ Bournemouth (loan)	21	(1)
2012–2025	Crystal Palace	331	(5)
2026	Swansea City	15	(0)
- * Club domestic league appearances and goals as of 02:53, 2 May 2026 (UTC)

Joel Edward Philip Ward (born 29 October 1989) is an English professional footballer who plays as a right-back or centre-back.

A versatile defender who can play anywhere across the back-line, Ward was an academy graduate of Portsmouth. He made his senior debut in 2009 following a loan to Bournemouth, and made 96 appearances for the club.

In May 2012, Ward signed for Crystal Palace, and later helped the side achieve promotion to the Premier League in his first season. He has since gone on to make the most top-flight appearances of any player in the club's history, as well as serving the 2023–24 season as club captain and winning the FA Cup in 2025. He departed the club following his release at the end of the 2024–25 season, having been the last active remaining player from the club's 2012–13 Premier League promotion-winning campaign, and amassed a total of 330 league appearances across 13 seasons.

== Career ==
=== Portsmouth ===
Ward started his footballing career with local youth team East Lodge and signed a professional contract with Portsmouth in July 2008 after spending two years in the Academy and Reserves.

==== AFC Bournemouth (loan) ====
The following month, Ward signed a one-year loan deal with AFC Bournemouth to gain first team experience. It came after when he and Matt Ritchie went on trial with the Cherries and appeared in the club's three friendly matches. Upon joining AFC Bournemouth, Ward said: "I think it will be a great opportunity for me to get first-team football and work for my place. Hopefully I can get game time and getting that experience is all part of growing up. I think League Two will be a test and it's a step up from youth and reserves football. It will be tough to compete but I think I'm capable of raising the bar."

He soon made his debut in a League Cup match against Cardiff City on 12 August, playing the full 90 minutes as Cardiff ran out 2–1 winners. His League Two debut came later that week on 16 August 2008 in an away draw with Aldershot Town. As the season progressed, Ward continued to appear in defence for the Cherries, competing for a place in the starting–eleven. He gained the first yellow and red cards of his career on 18 October in a 4–1 away defeat to Shrewsbury Town, eventually being sent off for two bookable offences. After serving a one match suspension, Ward made his return, coming on as a 85th-minute substitute, in a 1–0 loss against Lincoln City on 25 October 2008. However, his form meant that he returned to the side soon afterwards, making his Football League Trophy and FA Cup debuts: a home defeat by Colchester United and a home win against Bristol Rovers on 4 and 8 November respectively.

However, in a match against Shrewsbury Town on 7 February 2009, Ward suffered ankle injury after "falling awkwardly" and was substituted in the 16th minute, as the club won 1–0. After the match, he was out for eight weeks. By April, Ward was making progress on rehabilitation from his injury. He returned to the first team and scored his first and only Bournemouth goal in a 4–0 win over Morecambe on 2 May 2009. At the end of the 2008–09 season, Ward went on to make twenty–five appearances and scoring once in all competitions. Following this, he returned to his parent club.

==== Return to Portsmouth ====
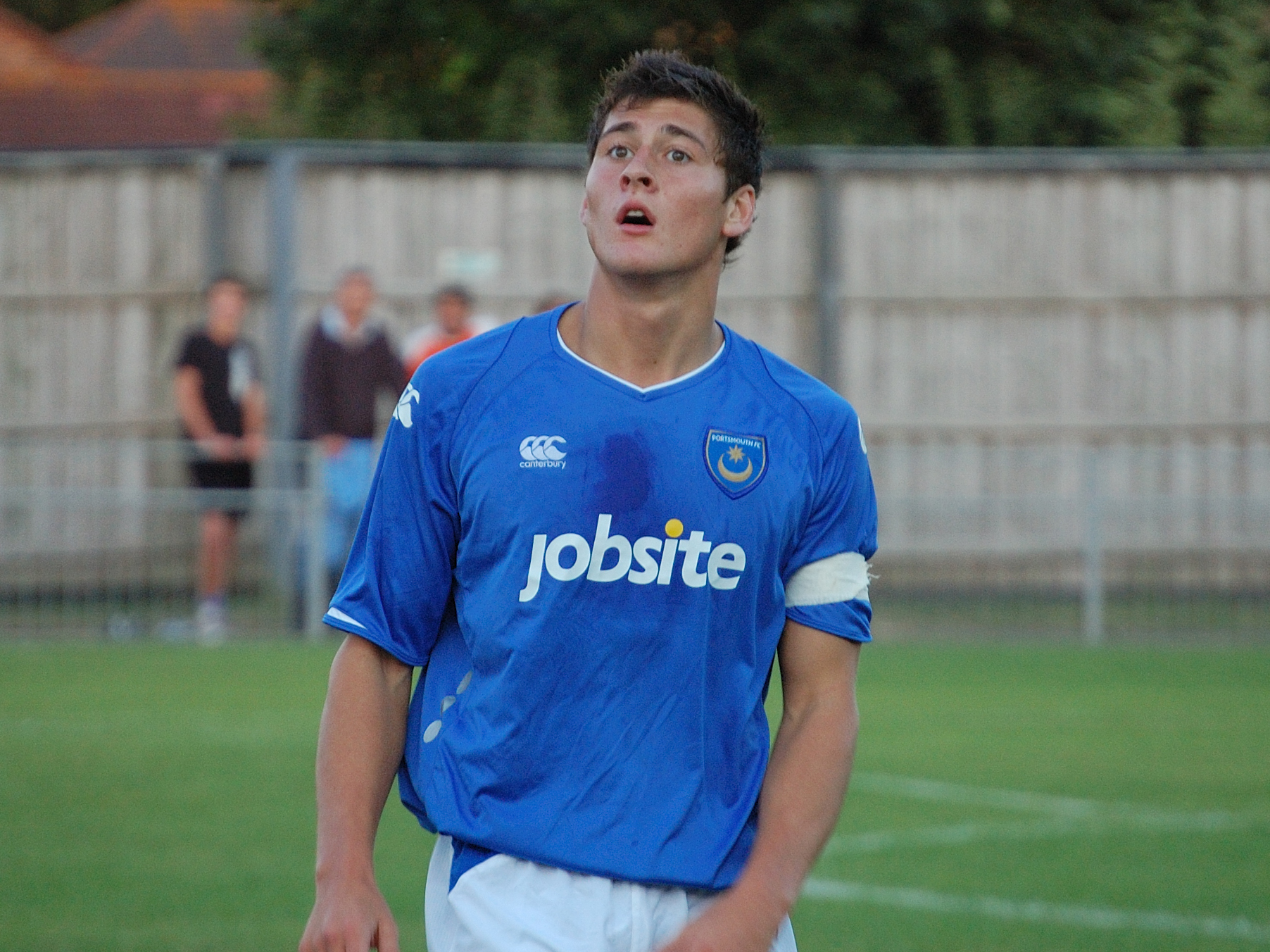
Ward playing for Portsmouth in a match against Gosport Borough in 2009

On 26 August 2009, Ward made his Portsmouth debut as a centre-back against Hereford United in the League Cup, before making his Premier League debut on 14 April 2010 against Wigan Athletic, playing from start to finish at left-back as the game finished goalless. Ward played in most of Pompey's remaining league matches that season and remained at Fratton Park in the summer even after they were relegated to the Championship. He began the new season as first-choice right-back, but later lost his starting berth to Wolverhampton Wanderers loanee Greg Halford. Ward scored his first Portsmouth goal in a 3–2 defeat to Doncaster Rovers on 13 November 2010.

Starting with their 2–0 away victory over Doncaster Rovers on 12 February 2011, a game in which he scored, Ward played as an attacking midfielder in Portsmouth's new 4–2–3–1 formation and earned praise from manager Steve Cotterill who was quoted as saying: "Joel Ward has got great energy and did well in that role in the centre in midfield in behind the striker." On 18 December 2011, Ward scored the equaliser in the South Coast derby against Southampton which finished 1–1.

=== Crystal Palace ===
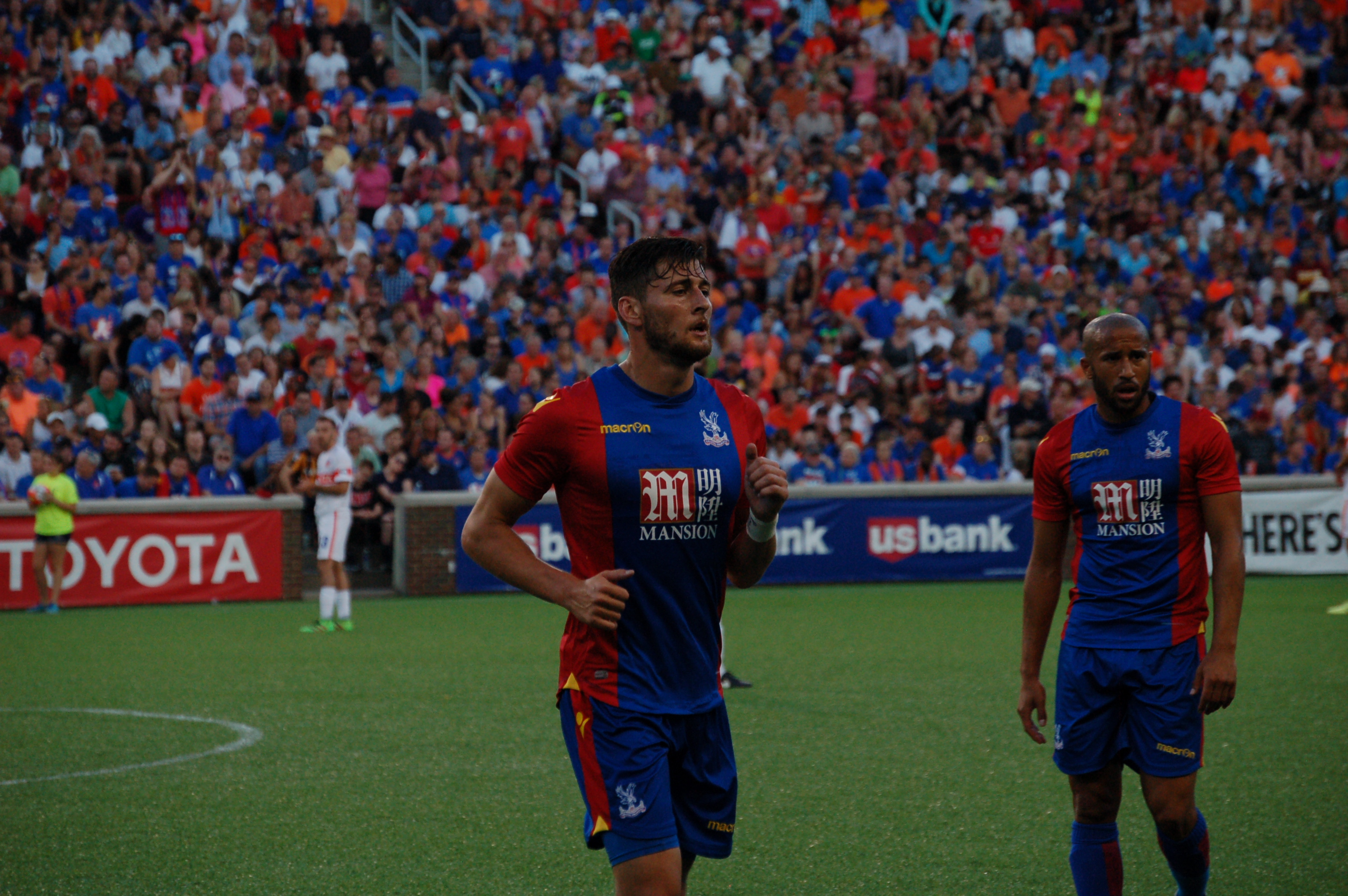
Ward (left) with Andros Townsend during an exhibition match between Crystal Palace and FC Cincinnati in 2016

On 28 May 2012, Ward completed a move to Crystal Palace for £400,000 on a four-year deal. He made his debut on 14 August 2012, in a 2–1 win against Exeter City in the League Cup. He made his league debut four days later in a home game against Watford. He won promotion with Crystal Palace after clearing a shot off the line during the last minute of injury time against the same opponents in the 2013 Championship play-off final. Ward scored his first goal for Crystal Palace in a 3–1 home win against Queens Park Rangers on 14 March 2015.

On 15 April 2015, Ward signed a new three-and-a-half-year contract which kept him at Palace until the summer of 2018. As of May 2016, Ward currently holds the record for most Premier League appearances for a Crystal Palace player. He reached the hundred milestone in a 1–1 draw away to Arsenal on 17 April 2016. On 2 July 2018, Ward signed a new three-year deal at the club until the summer of 2021.

In July 2021, Ward signed a two-year contract extension. In June 2023, Ward signed a one-year contract extension, and replaced the departing Luka Milivojević as club captain for a season, until Marc Guéhi replaced him the following summer. In May 2024, Ward signed another contract extension, until June 2025.

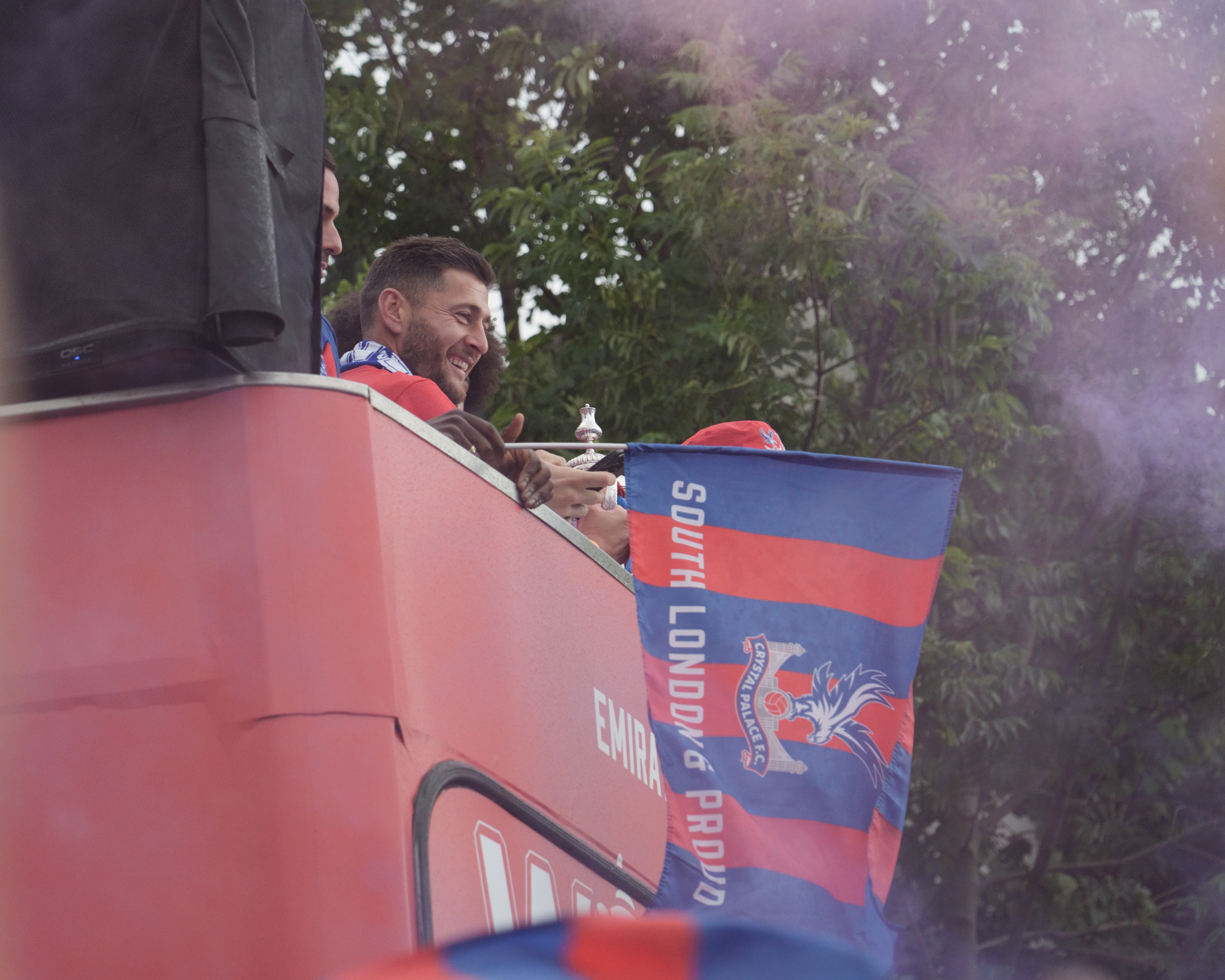
Ward in 2025 with Crystal Palace following their FA Cup triumph.

On 13 May 2025, it was announced that Ward would not extend his contract and he would leave the club at the end of the 2024–25 season, having made a total of over 360 appearances in all competitions over thirteen years at the club. Ward was the last remaining member of the 2013 Championship play-off winning squad. He was an unused substitute as Palace won the 2025 FA Cup final on 17 May, lifting the trophy alongside Guéhi. Ward played his final match at Selhurst Park three days later, starting in a 4–2 victory over Wolverhampton Wanderers; he was substituted off in the 71st minute and received a standing ovation, and later stated he "couldn't have written a better story and a better ending" to his time at the club.

=== Swansea City ===
On 9 January 2026, Ward joined Championship club Swansea City on a short-term deal until the end of the 2025–26 season.

== Style of play ==
Ward operated mainly as a central defender at the start of his professional career, particularly during the beginning of his time at Portsmouth and loan to Bournemouth. He proved his versatility in the 2010–11 season with Steve Cotterill deploying him as a right-back at the start of the season, and also played him as a central midfielder, right midfielder and as an attacking midfielder. Whilst at Palace, he predominantly played at right-back, though often filled in at left back, most notably in the 2013–14 and 2014–15 seasons. In the 2023–24 season, under new manager Oliver Glasner, Ward's defensive solidity saw him revert to playing as a right-sided centre-back when Glasner used a system with three centre-backs.

== Personal life ==
Ward is currently involved with helping and supporting local charity Faith and Football, which was set up by former Pompey defender Linvoy Primus. He attended the Bourne Community College in Southbourne and Bishop Luffa School in Chichester. Ward is a Christian and kneels down on the pitch to pray before each match. On 20 April 2014, Ward returned to his home church for an interview about how he brings his Christian faith to his job as a footballer. He currently resides in London.

== Career statistics ==
As of match played 2 May 2026

Appearances and goals by club, season and competition
Club	Season	League			FA Cup		League Cup		Other		Total	
Club	Season	Division	Apps	Goals	Apps	Goals	Apps	Goals	Apps	Goals	Apps	Goals
Portsmouth	2009–10	Premier League	3	0	0	0	1	0	—		4	0
Portsmouth	2010–11	Championship	42	3	1	0	3	0	—		46	3
Portsmouth	2011–12	Championship	44	3	1	0	1	0	—		46	3
Portsmouth	Total		89	6	2	0	5	0	0	0	96	6
AFC Bournemouth (loan)	2008–09	League Two	21	1	2	0	1	0	1 (Note: Appearance in Football League Trophy)	0	25	1
Crystal Palace	2012–13	Championship	25	0	0	0	2	0	3 (Note: Appearances in Championship play-offs)	0	30	0
Crystal Palace	2013–14	Premier League	36	0	0	0	0	0	—		36	0
Crystal Palace	2014–15	Premier League	37	1	3	0	0	0	—		40	1
Crystal Palace	2015–16	Premier League	30	2	6	1	2	0	—		38	3
Crystal Palace	2016–17	Premier League	38	0	3	0	1	0	—		42	0
Crystal Palace	2017–18	Premier League	19	0	0	0	1	0	—		20	0
Crystal Palace	2018–19	Premier League	7	1	3	0	2	0	—		12	1
Crystal Palace	2019–20	Premier League	29	0	0	0	0	0	—		29	0
Crystal Palace	2020–21	Premier League	26	0	0	0	0	0	—		26	0
Crystal Palace	2021–22	Premier League	28	0	3	0	1	0	—		32	0
Crystal Palace	2022–23	Premier League	28	1	1	0	1	0	—		30	1
Crystal Palace	2023–24	Premier League	26	0	0	0	0	0	—		26	0
Crystal Palace	2024–25	Premier League	2	0	0	0	1	0	—		3	0
Crystal Palace	Total		331	5	19	1	11	0	3	0	364	6
Swansea City	2025–26	Championship	15	0	1	0	—		—		16	0
Career total			456	12	24	1	17	0	4	0	501	13

== Honours ==
Crystal Palace

- FA Cup: 2024–25; runner-up: 2015–16
- Football League Championship play-offs: 2013

Sporting positions
Preceded by Luka Milivojević	Captain of Crystal Palace; 2023–2024	Succeeded by Marc Guéhi
