= 2011–12 Portsmouth F.C. season =

Portsmouth
2011–12 season
- Owner: Vladimir Antonov
- Chief Executive Officer: David Lampitt
- Manager: Steve Cotterill (until October 14); Stuart Gray and Guy Whittingham (caretakers until November 10); Michael Appleton
- Stadium: Fratton Park
- Championship: 22nd (relegated)
- FA Cup: Third round
- League Cup: First round
- Top goalscorer: League: David Norris (8); All: David Norris (8)
- Highest home attendance: 19,879 vs. Southampton (18 December 2011)
- Lowest home attendance: 11,261 vs. Barnsley (15 October 2011)
- Average home league attendance: 15,570
Home colours	Away colours	Third colours

The 2011–12 Season was Portsmouth's second season in The Championship after they were relegated from the Premier League during the 2009–10 season.

== Players ==
=== First-team squad ===
As of 18 April 2012

Note: Flags indicate national team as defined under FIFA eligibility rules; some limited exceptions apply. Players may hold more than one non-FIFA nationality.

No.	Pos.	Nation	Player
1	GK	ENG	Jamie Ashdown
2	MF	ENG	Joel Ward
3	DF	POR	Ricardo Rocha
4	DF	RSA	Aaron Mokoena
5	DF	ENG	Jason Pearce (captain)
9	FW	HUN	Márkó Futács
11	FW	ENG	Luke Varney
14	MF	NGR	Kelvin Etuhu
15	DF	ENG	Greg Halford
16	MF	SCO	Scott Allan (on loan from West Bromwich Albion)
17	FW	ENG	Ashley Harris

No.	Pos.	Nation	Player
18	FW	ENG	Dave Kitson
19	MF	ENG	David Norris (vice-captain)
22	FW	SCO	Chris Maguire (on loan from Derby County)
23	DF	NED	Karim Rekik (on loan from Manchester City)
25	FW	ZIM	Benjani Mwaruwari
26	DF	ISR	Tal Ben Haim
27	FW	NGR	Nwankwo Kanu
30	DF	ENG	Sam Magri
31	DF	ENG	Adam Webster
32	MF	ENG	Jed Wallace
33	DF	AUS	Alex Grant

For reserves and academy, see Portsmouth F.C. Reserves and Academy

=== Transfers ===
Portsmouth have confirmed that any contracts due to expire at the end of the 2010–11 season would not be renewed due to their financial problems, and will release ten players.

To make things worse, the number of first-team players reduced, with Nadir Çiftçi transferring to Kayserispor.

On 1 June 2011 the club announced that it had been bought by Convers Sports Initiatives (CSI).

After the club takeout, new signings arrived on Fratton Park. David Norris arrived on a free transfer from Ipswich Town; Jason Pearce came from Bournemouth; Luke Varney, from Derby County; Stephen Henderson, from Bristol City and Greg Halford, from Wolverhampton Wanderers.

On 13 August, prior to kick-off against Brighton at Fratton Park, it was announced, much to the delight of the home fans, that Portsmouth had re-signed forward Benjani Mwaruwari, who previously left the club in 2008. On 14 October, Steve Cotterill agreed a compensation package to be allowed to take the vacant Nottingham Forest manager's position. Later that day, it was announced that first team coaches Stuart Gray and Guy Whittingham would take over management duties, Cotterill's departure allowed several omitted players a return to the first team, such as Dave Kitson and Ricardo Rocha in a 2–0 home win against Barnsley.

Following Cotterill's departure, Michael Appleton was announced as the new manager on 10 November 2011. His first match in charge was a 2–0 defeat at Watford, only Appleton's second match as a first team manager after taking charge of a single match during a spell as caretaker manager of West Bromwich Albion.

On 23 November 2011, a Europe-wide arrest warrant was issued for Portsmouth owner, Vladimir Antonov, by Lithuanian prosecutors as part of an investigation into alleged asset stripping at Lithuanian bank Bankas Snoras, which is 68% owned by Antonov and went into temporary administration the previous week. Operations in another of Antonov's banks, Latvijas Krajbanka were suspended by Latvian authorities on 22 November 2011 for similar reasons. Antonov was subsequently arrested at his offices in London on 24 November and has been bailed.

CSI released a statement which said "In the light of the recent events at Snoras Bank, Convers Sports Initiatives (CSI) would like to reassure its companies, staff, and the fans of its teams and events, that it remains very much business as usual." The statement added that "CSI has been solely financed through the private wealth of its owners. Snoras Bank has never provided funding for the purchase of a CSI organisation, nor has it lent any money to these businesses after they have been acquired." However, Lithuanian prosecutors added that they would be taking "all the necessary steps" to freeze assets belonging to Mr Antonov and his business partner. On 29 November, Antonov resigned as chairman of Portsmouth after parent company Convers Sports Initiatives entered administration.

On 24 January Portsmouth FC were issued with a winding up petition by HMRC for over 1.6 million in unpaid taxes, this petition will be heard on 20 February 2012. The lack of potential suitors has led to the fear that the club could fold becoming a reality. Those previously linked with investing in the club including Irishman Tony McSweeney and Peter Storrie have so far not submitted any interest and the other potential investor Joseph Cala has withdrawn his interest.

==== In ====
No.	Pos.	Nat.	Name	Age	EU	Moving from	Type	Transfer window	Ends	Transfer fee	Source
—	MF	(England)	Lewis Stockford	18	EU	Youth system	Promoted ✓	Summer	2012	Youth system	
—	DF	(England)	Lewis Tallack	18	EU	Youth system	Promoted ✓	Summer	2012	Youth system	
19	MF	(England)	David Norris	30	EU	Ipswich Town	Contract Ended ✓	Summer	2014	Free	
5	DF	(England)	Jason Pearce	23	EU	Bournemouth	Transfer ✓	Summer	2014	£300,000	
11	FW	(England)	Luke Varney	28	EU	Derby County	Transfer ✓	Summer	2014	£750,000	
13	GK	(Republic of Ireland)	Stephen Henderson	23	EU	Bristol City	Transfer ✓	Summer	2013	Compensation (£100,000)	
15	DF	(England)	Greg Halford	27	EU	Wolverhampton Wanderers	Transfer ✓	Summer	2014	Undisclosed	
—	DF	(Jamaica)	Shavar Thomas	30	Non-EU		Trial ✗	Summer	2011	Free	
20	DF	(Scotland)	Christian Dailly	37	EU	Charlton Athletic	Transfer ✓	Summer	2011	Free	
17	MF	(Australia)	Ryan Williams	17	EU	Youth system	Promoted ✓	Summer	2012	Youth system	
25	FW	(Zimbabwe)	Benjani	33	EU	Blackburn Rovers	Transfer ✓	Summer	2012	Free	
10	FW	(Norway)	Erik Huseklepp	26	Non-EU	Bari (Italy)	Transfer ✓	Summer	2014	£1,500,000	
9	FW	(Hungary)	Márkó Futács	36	EU	Werder Bremen (Germany)	Trial/Transfer ✓	Summer	2012	Free	Sky Sports
—	MF	(England)	Jed Wallace	17	EU	Lewes	Trial/Transfer ✓	Summer	2014	Free	
20	MF	(Norway)	Bjørn Helge Riise	28	Non-EU	Fulham	Loan ✓	During Season	2011	Free	
—	DF	(Spain)	Fernando Vega	27	EU	Real Betis (Spain)	Trial ✗	During Season	2011	Free	
14	MF	(Ivory Coast)	Abdul Razak	18	EU	Manchester City	Loan ✓	During Season	2011	Free	
		(England)	Michael Appleton	35	EU	West Bromwich Albion	Manager ✓	During Season	2014	Compensation	
—	FW	(England)	Omarr Lawson	17	EU	Dulwich Hamlet	Trial ✗	During Season	2011	Free	
20	MF	(England)	George Thorne	18	EU	West Bromwich Albion	Loan ✓	During Season	2011	Free	
16	DF	(England)	Joe Mattock	21	EU	West Bromwich Albion	Loan ✓	During Season	2011	Free	
—	FW	(England)	Dan Thompson	17	EU	Hampton & Richmond	Trial ✓	During Season	2012	Free	
31	DF	(England)	Adam Webster	16	EU	Youth system	Promoted ✓	Summer	2012	Youth system	
14	MF	(Nigeria)	Kelvin Etuhu	23	EU		Transfer ✓	Winter	2012	Free	
20	MF	(England)	George Thorne	19	EU	West Bromwich Albion	Loan ✓	During Season	2012	Free	
16	MF	(Scotland)	Scott Allan	20	EU	West Bromwich Albion	Loan ✓	During Season	2012	Free	
17	FW	(England)	Ashley Harris	18	EU	Youth system	Promoted ✓	During Season	2013	Free	
22	FW	(Scotland)	Chris Maguire	23	EU	Derby County	Loan ✓	During Season	2012	Free	
23	DF	(Netherlands)	Karim Rekik	17	EU	Manchester City	Loan ✓	During Season	2012	Free	
24	FW	(Italy)	Luca Scapuzzi	20	EU	Manchester City	Loan ✓	During Season	2012	Free	

Total spending: ▼£2,650,000

==== Out ====
No.	Pos.	Nat.	Name	Age	EU	Moving to	Type	Transfer window	Transfer fee	Source
11	MF	(England)	Michael Brown	34	EU	Leeds United	Contract Ended ✓	Summer	Free	
37	GK	(England)	Darryl Flahavan	33	EU	Bournemouth	Contract Ended ✓	Summer	Free	
—	MF	(England)	Billy Goddard	19	EU	Free agent	Contract Ended ✓	Summer	Free	
39	MF	(England)	Peter Gregory	19	EU	Eastbourne Borough	Contract Ended ✓	Summer	Free	
22	MF	(Scotland)	Richard Hughes	32	EU	Free agent	Contract Ended ✓	Summer	Free	
36	MF	(England)	Tom Kilbey	20	EU	Free agent	Contract Ended ✓	Summer	Free	
38	DF	(England)	Ellis Martin	19	EU	Gosport Borough	Contract Ended ✓	Summer	Free	
40	MF	(England)	Marlon Pack	21	EU	Cheltenham Town	Contract Ended ✓	Summer	Free	
—	DF	(England)	Perry Ryan	19	EU	Havant & Waterlooville	Contract Ended ✓	Summer	Free	
9	FW	(England)	Danny Webber	29	EU	Leeds United	Contract Ended ✓	Summer	Free	
—	DF	(Australia)	Billy Tsovolos	18	EU	Eastleigh	Contract Ended ✓	Summer	Free	
24	FW	(Turkey)	Nadir Çiftçi	19	EU	Kayserispor	Transfer ✓	Summer	Compensation (£100,000)	
10	FW	(England)	David Nugent	26	EU	Leicester City	Contract Ended ✓	Summer	Free	
—	GK	(England)	Tom Fry	13	EU	Crystal Palace	Transfer ✓	Summer	Compensation	
—	GK	(England)	Stuart Moore	16	EU	Reading	Transfer ✓	Summer	Compensation	
20	DF	(Scotland)	Christian Dailly	37	EU	Southend United	Contract Ended ✓	During Season	Free	
—	MF	(England)	Lewis Stockford	18	EU	Salisbury City	Loan ✓	During Season	Free	
—	DF	(England)	Lewis Tallack	18	EU	Dorchester Town	Loan ✓	During Season	Free	
—	FW	(Nigeria)	Chinedu Vine	17	EU		Work Experience ✓	During Season	Free	
—	MF	(Australia)	Jordan Fitzharris	17	EU		Work Experience ✓	During Season	Free	
—	FW	(England)	Aaron Kinchen	17	EU		Work Experience ✓	During Season	Free	
		(England)	Steve Cotterill	47	EU	Nottingham Forest	Manager ✓	During Season	Compensation	
20	MF	(Norway)	Bjørn Helge Riise	28	Non-EU	Fulham	Loan Return ✓	During Season	Free	
14	MF	(Ivory Coast)	Abdul Razak	19	EU	Manchester City	Loan Return ✓	During Season	Free	
20	MF	(England)	George Thorne	18	EU	West Bromwich Albion	Loan Return ✓	During Season	Free	
16	DF	(England)	Joe Mattock	21	EU	West Bromwich Albion	Loan Return ✓	During Season	Free	
—	FW	(England)	Dan Thompson	18	EU	Havant & Waterlooville	Loan ✓	During Season	Free	
6	DF	(Iceland)	Hermann Hreidarsson	37	EU	Coventry City	Transfer ✓	Winter	Free	
17	MF	(Australia)	Ryan Williams	18	EU	Fulham	Transfer ✓	Winter	£400,000	
—	DF	(England)	Sam Magri	18	EU	Liverpool	Trial ✓	During Season	Free	
10	FW	(Norway)	Erik Huseklepp	27	Non-EU	Birmingham City	Loan ✓	During Season	Free	
—	MF	(England)	Lewis Stockford	19	EU	AFC Totton	Loan ✓	During Season	Free	
—	FW	(Republic of Ireland)	Carl Walshe	19	EU	Frome Town	Loan ✓	During Season	Free	
—	MF	(Republic of Ireland)	Liam Lawrence	30	EU	Cardiff City (Wales)	Loan ✓	During Season	Free	
—	DF	(England)	Lewis Tallack	19	EU	Poole Town	Loan ✓	During Season	Free	
—	MF	(England)	Hayden Mullins	32	EU	Reading	Loan ✓	During Season	Free	
—	GK	(Republic of Ireland)	Stephen Henderson	23	EU	West Ham United	Loan ✓	During Season	Free	
20	MF	(England)	George Thorne	19	EU	West Bromwich Albion	Loan Return ✓	During Season	Free	
—	FW	(Italy)	Luca Scapuzzi	21	EU	Manchester City	Loan Return ✓	During Season	Free	

Total gaining: ▲£500,000

== Key events ==
- 15 June: David Norris signed a three-year deal with the club.
- 24 June: Portsmouth buy Jason Pearce in an undisclosed fee.
- 13 August: Portsmouth resigns Benjani Mwaruwari.
- 14 October: Steve Cotterill leaves Portsmouth to manage Nottingham Forest.
- 10 November: Portsmouth announces Michael Appleton as the club's new manager.
- 23 November: A Europe-wide arrest warrant is issued for Portsmouth owner, Vladimir Antonov, with an asset stripping allegation.
- 24 November: Antonov is arrested at his offices in London.
- 29 November: Antonov resigns as Portsmouth chairman.
- 24 January: Portsmouth FC is issued with a winding up petition by HMRC for over £1.6m in unpaid taxes.
- 4 April: Spokesman Scott Mclachlan says that needs more than £8m to buy Portsmouth.
- 11 April: Portsmouth administrator Trevor Birch announces that no offers have been made to buy the club.
- 21 April: Portsmouth is relegated after a 1–2 home defeat against Derby County.
- 28 April: After the last game of the season, Portsmouth manager Michael Appleton says that "17 or 18 players could be leaving the club and the same number coming in" in this summer.

== Player statistics ==
=== Squad stats ===
As of 28 April 2012

No.	Pos	Nat	Player	Total		The Championship		FA Cup		League Cup	
No.	Pos	Nat	Player	Apps	Goals	Apps	Goals	Apps	Goals	Apps	Goals
1	GK	(England) ENG	Jamie Ashdown	21	0	21	0	0	0	0	0
2	DF	(England) ENG	Joel Ward	46	3	44	3	1	0	1	0
3	DF	(Portugal) POR	Ricardo Rocha	35	0	33	0	1	0	1	0
4	DF	(South Africa) RSA	Aaron Mokoena	20	0	18	0	1	0	1	0
5	DF	(England) ENG	Jason Pearce	44	2	43	2	1	0	0	0
9	FW	(Hungary) HUN	Márkó Futács	30	5	29	5	1	0	0	0
11	FW	(England) ENG	Luke Varney	31	6	30	6	0	0	1	0
14	MF	(Nigeria) NGR	Kelvin Etuhu	13	1	13	1	0	0	0	0
15	DF	(England) ENG	Greg Halford	44	7	42	7	1	0	1	0
16	MF	(Scotland) SCO	Scott Allan	15	1	15	1	0	0	0	0
17	FW	(England) ENG	Ashley Harris	5	0	5	0	0	0	0	0
18	FW	(England) ENG	Dave Kitson	35	4	33	4	1	0	1	0
19	MF	(England) ENG	David Norris	42	8	40	8	1	0	1	0
22	FW	(Scotland) SCO	Chris Maguire	11	3	11	3	0	0	0	0
23	DF	(Netherlands) NED	Karim Rekik	8	0	8	0	0	0	0	0
25	FW	(Zimbabwe) ZIM	Benjani Mwaruwari	18	1	18	1	0	0	0	0
26	DF	(Israel) ISR	Tal Ben Haim	33	0	33	0	0	0	0	0
27	FW	(Nigeria) NGR	Nwankwo Kanu	11	1	10	1	0	0	1	0
30	DF	(England) ENG	Sam Magri	0	0	0	0	0	0	0	0
31	DF	(England) ENG	Adam Webster	3	0	3	0	0	0	0	0
32	MF	(England) ENG	Jed Wallace	0	0	0	0	0	0	0	0
33	DF	(Australia) AUS	Alex Grant	0	0	0	0	0	0	0	0
Players who have left the club after the start of the season:
6	DF	(Iceland) ISL	Hermann Hreidarsson	2	0	2	0	0	0	0	0
7	MF	(Ireland) EIR	Liam Lawrence	25	0	23	0	1	0	1	0
8	MF	(England) ENG	Hayden Mullins	36	1	34	1	1	0	1	0
10	FW	(Norway) NOR	Erik Huseklepp	28	6	27	6	1	0	0	0
13	GK	(Republic of Ireland) IRL	Stephen Henderson	27	0	25	0	1	0	1	0
14	MF	(Ivory Coast) CIV	Abdul Razak	3	0	3	0	0	0	0	0
16	DF	(England) ENG	Joe Mattock	7	0	7	0	0	0	0	0
17	FW	(Australia) AUS	Ryan Williams	6	0	4	0	1	0	1	0
20	DF	(Scotland) SCO	Christian Dailly	2	0	1	0	0	0	1	0
20	MF	(Norway) NOR	Bjørn Helge Riise	2	0	2	0	0	0	0	0
20	MF	(England) ENG	George Thorne	14	0	14	0	0	0	0	0
24	FW	(Italy) ITA	Luca Scapuzzi	2	0	2	0	0	0	0	0

=== Top scorers ===
Updated on 22 April

Place	Position	Nation	Number	Name	Championship	FA Cup	League Cup	Total
1	MF	(England)	19	David Norris	8	0	0	8
2	DF	(England)	15	Greg Halford	7	0	0	7
3	FW	(Norway)	10	Erik Huseklepp	6	0	0	6
3	FW	(England)	11	Luke Varney	6	0	0	6
4	FW	(Hungary)	9	Márkó Futács	5	0	0	5
5	DF	(England)	2	Joel Ward	3	0	0	3
5	FW	(England)	18	Dave Kitson	3	0	0	3
5	FW	(Scotland)	22	Chris Maguire	3	0	0	3
6	DF	(England)	5	Jason Pearce	2	0	0	2
7	MF	(Nigeria)	14	Kelvin Etuhu	1	0	0	1
7	MF	(Scotland)	16	Scott Allan	1	0	0	1
7	FW	(Zimbabwe)	25	Benjani	1	0	0	1
7	FW	(Nigeria)	27	Nwankwo Kanu	1	0	0	1
7	MF	(England)	8	Hayden Mullins	1	0	0	1
Own Goals					1	0	0	1
				TOTALS	50	0	0	50

=== Disciplinary record ===
Updated on 28 April

Number	Nation	Position	Name	Championship		FA Cup		League Cup		Total	
Number	Nation	Position	Name	Yellow card	Red card	Yellow card	Red card	Yellow card	Red card	Yellow card	Red card
15	(England)	DF	Greg Halford	7	0	1	0	1	0	9	0
18	(England)	FW	Dave Kitson	7	1	1	0	0	0	8	1
26	(Israel)	DF	Tal Ben Haim	8	0	0	0	0	0	8	0
19	(England)	MF	David Norris	7	1	0	0	0	0	7	1
3	(Portugal)	DF	Ricardo Rocha	6	0	1	0	0	0	7	0
11	(England)	FW	Luke Varney	6	1	0	0	0	0	6	1
2	(England)	DF	Joel Ward	5	0	0	0	1	0	6	0
7	(Republic of Ireland)	MF	Liam Lawrence	5	1	0	0	0	0	5	1
5	(England)	DF	Jason Pearce	4	0	1	0	0	0	5	0
4	(South Africa)	DF	Aaron Mokoena	4	0	0	0	0	0	4	0
22	(Scotland)	FW	Chris Maguire	4	0	0	0	0	0	4	0
8	(England)	MF	Hayden Mullins	3	0	0	0	0	0	3	0
9	(Hungary)	FW	Márkó Futács	3	0	0	0	0	0	3	0
6	(Iceland)	DF	Hermann Hreiðarsson	2	0	0	0	0	0	2	0
16	(England)	DF	Joe Mattock	2	0	0	0	0	0	2	0
25	(Zimbabwe)	FW	Benjani Mwaruwari	2	0	0	0	0	0	2	0
17	(Australia)	FW	Ryan Williams	0	0	1	0	1	0	2	0
1	(England)	GK	Jamie Ashdown	1	0	0	0	0	0	1	0
10	(Norway)	FW	Erik Huseklepp	1	0	0	0	0	0	1	0
14	(Nigeria)	MF	Kelvin Etuhu	1	0	0	0	0	0	1	0
16	(Scotland)	MF	Scott Allan	1	0	0	0	0	0	1	0
23	(Netherlands)	DF	Karim Rekik	1	0	0	0	0	0	1	0
			TOTALS	77	4	4	0	3	0	84	4

== Competition ==
=== The Championship ===
Pos	Team	Pld	W	D	L	GF	GA	GD	Pts	Promotion or relegation
20	Bristol City	46	12	13	21	44	68	−24	49	
21	Barnsley	46	13	9	24	49	74	−25	48	
22	Portsmouth (R)	46	13	11	22	50	59	−9	40 (Note: Portsmouth were deducted 10 points for entering administration.)	Relegation to League One
23	Coventry City (R)	46	9	13	24	41	65	−24	40	Relegation to League One
24	Doncaster Rovers (R)	46	8	12	26	43	80	−37	36	Relegation to League One

Updated to match(es) played on 28 April 2012. Source: BBC Sport
Rules for classification: 1) points; 2) goal difference; 3) number of goals scored.
(R) Relegated

==== Results summary ====
Overall								Home						Away					
Pld	W	D	L	GF	GA	GD	Pts	W	D	L	GF	GA	GD	W	D	L	GF	GA	GD
46	13	11	22	50	59	−9	50	10	5	8	30	24	+6	3	6	14	20	35	−15

Last updated: 28 April 2012.
Source: Championship Table

==== Results by round ====
Round	1	2	3	4	5	6	7	8	9	10	11	12	13	14	15	16	17	18	19	20	21	22	23	24	25	26	27	28	29	30	31	32	33	34	35	36	37	38	39	40	41	42	43	44	45	46
Ground	A	H	H	A	H	A	A	H	H	A	H	A	H	A	A	H	A	H	A	H	A	H	A	A	H	H	A	A	A	H	A	H	H	A	A	H	H	H	A	H	A	H	A	H	H	A
Result	D	L	W	D	D	L	L	W	L	L	W	L	W	L	D	W	L	D	L	W	W	D	L	D	W	L	L	W	W	D	L	L	D	L	L	L	D	W	L	L	D	L	W	W	L	L
Position	12	16	11	11	12	14	18	14	17	18	16	18	15	18	20	15	18	17	17	18	16	17	17	18	17	17	17	16	17	17	22	22	23	23	24	24	24	24	24	23	23	23	23	22	22	22

Updated to match(es) played on 29 April 2012. Source: Portsmouthfc.co.uk
A = Away; H = Home; W = Win; D = Draw; L = Loss

=== Competitive ===
==== Pre-season ====
11 July 2011	Havant & Waterlooville	0–4	Portsmouth	Havant
19:30 BST		Report	Ward 60'; Mullins 67'; Kitson 81'; Varney 89'	Stadium: West Leigh Park; Referee: David Phillips

16 July 2011	Portsmouth	0–1	Chelsea	Portsmouth
15:00 BST		Report	Ben-Haim 6' (o.g.)	Stadium: Fratton Park; Attendance: 19,345

22 July 2011	Charleston XI	2–2	Portsmouth	Charleston, South Carolina
00:30 BST	Prince 21'; Coleman 32'	Report	Flatley 46' (o.g.); Halford 75'	Stadium: Blackbaud Stadium; Referee: Howard Ash Jr.

28 July 2011	Charleston Battery	0–0	Portsmouth	Charleston, South Carolina
00:45 BST		Report		Stadium: Blackbaud Stadium; Referee: Dan Fitzgerald

30 July 2011	Portsmouth	P – P	Real Betis	Portsmouth
18:30				Stadium: Fratton Park
Note: Match postponed due to Portsmouth's flight delay

23 August 2011	Portsmouth	4–0	Swindon Town Reserves	Portsmouth
	Benjani 20', 41', 44'; Futács 45+'	Report		Stadium: Portsmouth F.C. Training Ground; Attendance: 0 (Closed Doors)

31 August 2011	Real Betis	5–1	Portsmouth	Seville, Spain
20:00	Castro 2'; Molina 18' (pen.) (yellow card) 33'; Montero 27'; Ezequiel 66', 77'	Report	(yellow card) 74' Ward; 90' Varney	Stadium: Benito Villamarín; Attendance: 10,307; Referee: Perez Montero

5 October 2011	Portsmouth	2–0	FC Rostov	Portsmouth
19:30	Futács 74'; Halford 80'			Stadium: Fratton Park; Attendance: 4,348

==== Championship ====
6 August 2011 1	Middlesbrough	2–2	Portsmouth	Middlesbrough
15:00 BST	Emnes 24'; Williams 54' (yellow card) 71'; McDonald (yellow card) 56'	Report	47' Norris; (yellow card) 56' Ben Haim; (yellow card) 56' Halford; (yellow card) 58' Hreidarsson; (yellow card) 74' Ward; (yellow card) 76' Mokoena; 90+2' Varney	Stadium: Riverside Stadium; Attendance: 18,196; Referee: Graham Salisbury

13 August 2011 2	Portsmouth	0–1	Brighton & Hove Albion	Portsmouth
15:00 BST	Ben Haim (yellow card) 13'; Varney (yellow card) 70'; Kitson (yellow card) 70'; Hreidarsson (yellow card) 79'; Lawrence (yellow card) 90+1'	Report	45+1' Mackail-Smith; (yellow card) 61' Bridcutt; (yellow card) 87' Iñigo Calderón; (yellow card) 90+5'	Stadium: Fratton Park; Attendance: 16,496; Referee: Swarbrick

16 August 2011 3	Portsmouth	1–0	Reading	Portsmouth
19:45 BST	Mullins (yellow card) 20'; Kitson 51'; Ward (yellow card) 90'	Report	(yellow card) 58' Hunt; (yellow card) 85' A. Pearce	Stadium: Fratton Park; Attendance: 13,438; Referee: D'Urso

20 August 2011 4	Bristol City	0 –0	Portsmouth	Bristol
15:00 BST	McAllister (yellow card) 38'	Report	(yellow card) 85' Ben Haim	Stadium: Ashton Gate Stadium; Attendance: 12,496; Referee: M. Naylor

27 August 2011 5	Portsmouth	1–1	Cardiff City	Portsmouth
15:00 BST	Lawrence (yellow card) 74'; Kanu 80'	Report	71' Taylor; (yellow card) 90' Gestede	Stadium: Fratton Park; Attendance: 14,354; Referee: Woolmer

10 September 2011 6	West Ham	4–3	Portsmouth	London
15:00 BST	Taylor 9'; O'Brien (yellow card) 15'; Nolan (yellow card) 48'; Lansbury 53'; Noble 72'; Cole 76'; Piquionne (red card) 90+4'	Report	8' (yellow card) 40' Varney; (yellow card) 20' Mokoena; (yellow card) 57' Mullins; 60' Norris; (red card) 67' Lawrence; 90+7' (pen.) Halford	Stadium: Boleyn Ground; Attendance: 33,465; Referee: East

17 September 2011 7	Hull City	1–0	Portsmouth	Kingston upon Hull
15:00 BST	Koren 11'	Report	(red card) 78' Varney; (yellow card) 80' Ben Haim	Stadium: KC Stadium; Attendance: 18,311; Referee: Haines

24 September 2011 Round 8	Portsmouth	1–0	Blackpool	Portsmouth
15:00 BST	Norris (yellow card) 31'; Pearce (yellow card) 43'; Rocha (yellow card) 63'; Huseklepp 90+4'	Report	(yellow card) 11' Crainey; (yellow card) 35' Evatt; (yellow card) 41' Ince; (yellow card) 71' Sylvestre; (yellow card) 85' Phillips; (yellow card) 90+3' Hurst	Stadium: Fratton Park; Attendance: 14,395; Referee: Deadman

27 September 2011 Round 9	Portsmouth	2–3	Peterborough United	Portsmouth
19:45 BST	Zakuani 8' (o.g.); Benjani 54'; Norris (yellow card) 76'	Report	4', 21' Frecklington; (yellow card) 17' Alcock; 90+5' (o.g.) Huseklepp	Stadium: Fratton Park; Attendance: 12,102; Referee: Miller

1 October 2011 Round 10	Leeds United	1–0	Portsmouth	Leeds
15:00 BST	Pugh 14'	Report	(yellow card) 31' Lawrence; (yellow card) 59' Halford	Stadium: Elland Road; Attendance: 22,476; Referee: Miller

15 October 2011 Round 11	Portsmouth	2–0	Barnsley	Portsmouth
17:20 BST	Norris 61'; Varney 62'	Report	(yellow card) 56' O'Brien; (yellow card) 60' Drinkwater	Stadium: Fratton Park; Attendance: 11,261; Referee: Hooper

18 October 2011 Round 12	Ipswich Town	1–0	Portsmouth	Ipswich
19:45 BST	Andrews 69'; Bowyer (yellow card) 82'	Report		Stadium: Portman Road; Attendance: 17,297; Referee: Ward

22 October 2011 Round 13	Portsmouth	3–1	Doncaster	Portsmouth
15:00 BST	Varney 3', 75'; Rocha (yellow card) 35'; Kitson 68'	Report	27' Gillett; (yellow card) 35' Sharp; (yellow card) 57' Bennett	Stadium: Fratton Park; Attendance: 12,779; Referee: Graham

29 October 2011 Round 14	Derby County	3–1	Portsmouth	Derby
15:00 BST	Bryson 3'; Shackell (yellow card) 9'; Maguire 14'; Ward 33'	Report	(yellow card) 17' Ward; 79' Pearce; (yellow card) 86' Varney	Stadium: Pride Park Stadium; Attendance: 24,148; Referee: Pawson

1 November 2011 Round 15	Crystal Palace	0–0	Portsmouth	Selhurst
19:45 BST	Gardner (yellow card) 63'; Moxey (yellow card) 66'	Report	(yellow card) 72' Norris; (yellow card) 80' Varney	Stadium: Selhurst Park; Attendance: 12,933; Referee: Drysdale

5 November 2011 Round 16	Portsmouth	3–0	Nottingham Forest	Portsmouth
15:00 BST	Huseklepp 45', 84'; Kitson 76'	Report	(yellow card) 3' Tudgay; (yellow card) 47' Lynch	Stadium: Fratton Park; Attendance: 14,207; Referee: Bates

19 November 2011 Round 17	Watford	2–0	Portsmouth	Watford
15:00 BST	Kightly 2'; Sordell 45'; Hogg (yellow card) 75'	Report	(yellow card) 57' Kitson	Stadium: Vicarage Road; Attendance: 12,864; Referee: Scott

26 November 2011 Round 18	Portsmouth	1–1	Leicester City	Portsmouth
15:00 BST	Norris (yellow card) 56' (goal) 68'; Halford (yellow card) 90+2'	Report	74' Nugent	Stadium: Fratton Park; Attendance: 14,391; Referee: Phil Gibbs

3 December 2011 Round 20	Portsmouth	2–1	Coventry City	Portsmouth
15:00 BST	Halford 20' (pen.); Ward 59'	Report	54' Jutkiewicz; (yellow card) 73' Wood	Stadium: Fratton Park; Attendance: 12,236; Referee: Boyeson

10 December 2011 Round 21	Burnley	0–1	Portsmouth	Burnley
15:00 BST		Report	(yellow card) 23' Kitson; (yellow card) 43' Mattock; 90+1' Norris	Stadium: Turf Moor; Attendance: 13,411; Referee: Rushton

18 December 2011 Round 22	Portsmouth	1–1	Southampton	Portsmouth
13:00 BST	Mattock (yellow card) 60'; Ward 84'	Report	(yellow card) 31' Cork; 63' Lambert	Stadium: Fratton Park; Attendance: 19,879; Referee: Halsey

26 December 2011 Round 23	Millwall	1–0	Portsmouth	South Bermondsey
13:00 BST	Lowry (yellow card) 69'; N'Guessan 82'	Report	(yellow card) 50' Huseklepp	Stadium: The Den; Attendance: 11,002; Referee: Miller

31 December 2011 Round 24	Leicester City	1–1	Portsmouth	Leicester
12:15 BST	Nugent 24'; Danns (yellow card) 82'	Report	20' Futács; (yellow card) 33' Mokoena; (yellow card) 61' Lawrence; (yellow card) 62' Halford; (yellow card) 83' Ward	Stadium: King Power Stadium; Attendance: 25,356; Referee: Webster

2 January 2012 Round 25	Portsmouth	2–0	Watford	Portsmouth
15:00 BST	Futács 54' (yellow card) 89'; Kitson (yellow card) 79'; Mullins 87'	Report	(yellow card) 56' Dickinson; (yellow card) 66' Mariappa; (red card) 82' Loach	Stadium: Fratton Park; Attendance: 14,362; Referee: Williamson

14 January 2012 Round 26	Portsmouth	0–1	West Ham	Portsmouth
15:00 BST	Kitson (yellow card) 22'; Pearce (yellow card) 43'; Norris (red card) 57'; Mullins (yellow card) 73'	Report	24' (pen.) Noble; (yellow card) 74' Nolan	Stadium: Fratton Park; Attendance: 18,492; Referee: Friend

21 January 2012 Round 27	Cardiff City	3–2	Portsmouth	Cardiff
15:00 BST	Miller 15'; Hudson 69'; Conway 90+2'	Report	39' (yellow card) 65' Futács; 49' Halford	Stadium: Cardiff City Stadium; Attendance: 22,199; Referee: Tanner

28 January 2012 Round 28	Peterborough United	0–3	Portsmouth	Peterborough
15:45		Report	5', 79' Huseklepp; 40' Pearce	Stadium: London Road Stadium; Attendance: 7,555; Referee: Webb

7 February 2012 Round 19	Birmingham	1–0	Portsmouth	Birmingham
19:45	Redmond 86'	Report	(yellow card) 83' Benjani	Stadium: St Andrew's; Attendance: 16,930; Referee: Drysdale

11 February 2012 Round 30	Blackpool	1–1	Portsmouth	Blackpool
17:20	76' Crainey	Report	45' Huseklepp	Stadium: Bloomfield Road; Attendance: 12,545; Referee: Madley

14 February 2012 Round 31	Portsmouth	0–1	Ipswich Town	Portsmouth
19:45	Ben Haim (yellow card) 13'; Halford (yellow card) 50'; Rocha (yellow card) 84'	Report	13' Chopra; (yellow card) 30' Hyam; (yellow card) 33' Emmanuel-Thomas; (yellow card) 57' Delaney	Stadium: Fratton Park; Attendance: 14,330; Referee: Deadman

18 February 2012 Round 32	Barnsley	2–0	Portsmouth	Barnsley
15:00	McEveley (yellow card) 43'; O'Brien 76'; Done 90'	report	(red card) 42' Kitson; (yellow card) 54' Mokoena; (yellow card) 62' Ben Haim; (yellow card) 90+4' Benjani	Stadium: Oakwell; Attendance: 9,336; Referee: Ilderton

25 February 2012 Round 33	Portsmouth	0–0	Leeds United	Portsmouth
15:00		Report	(yellow card) 42' O'Dea; (yellow card) 87' Brown	Stadium: Fratton Park; Attendance: 17,571; Referee: Gibbs

3 March 2012 Round 34	Portsmouth	1–3	Middlesbrough	Portsmouth
15:00	Ben Haim (yellow card) 45'; Rocha (yellow card) 55'; Halford (yellow card) 55' (goal) 66' (pen.); Ward (yellow card) 61'; Norris (yellow card) 69'	Report	(yellow card) 31' (goal) 63' Bates; (yellow card) 58' Haroun; 56' (pen.) (yellow card) 66' Robson; (yellow card) 76' Main; 83' Emnes; (red card) 90+4' Williams	Stadium: Fratton Park; Attendance: 16,770; Referee: Kettle

6 March 2012 Round 35	Reading	1–0	Portsmouth	Reading
20:00	Hunt 24'	Report		Stadium: Madejski Stadium; Attendance: 18,399; Referee: Langford

10 March 2012 Round 36	Brighton	2–0	Portsmouth	Brighton & Hove
15:00	Vicente 75', 90'	Report	(yellow card) 11' Halford; (yellow card) 39' Ben Haim	Stadium: Falmer Stadium; Attendance: 20,772; Referee: Dean

17 March 2012 Round 37	Portsmouth	0–0	Bristol City	Portsmouth
15:00	Rocha (yellow card) 84'; Pearce (yellow card) 90+5'	Report	(yellow card) 39' McManus; (yellow card) 70' Pearson	Stadium: Fratton Park; Attendance: 16,695; Referee: D'Urso

20 March 2012 Round 38	Portsmouth	4–1	Birmingham City	Portsmouth
19:45	Maguire 54'; Norris 60'; Etuhu 77'; Futács 90+2'	Report	7' Zigic; (yellow card) 38' (red card) 59' Murphy; (yellow card) 52' Davies	Stadium: Fratton Park; Attendance: 12,186; Referee: Malone

24 March 2012 Round 39	Coventry City	2–0	Portsmouth	Coventry
15:00	McSheffrey 55' (yellow card) 75'; Keogh (yellow card) 67'; Norwood 77'	Report	(yellow card) 81' Maguire	Stadium: Ricoh Arena; Attendance: Geoff Eltrigham; Referee: 15,809

27 March 2012 Round 29	Portsmouth	2–0	Hull City	Portsmouth
19:45	Maguire 21'; Ward 25'; Rekik (yellow card) 75'	Report	(yellow card) 34' Dawson; (yellow card) 64' Hobbs; (yellow card) 77' Rosenior	Stadium: Fratton Park; Attendance: 14,751; Referee: Sheldrake

31 March 2012 Round 40	Portsmouth	1–5	Burnley	Portsmouth
15:00	Norris 19' (yellow card) 84'; Futács (yellow card) 78'; Maguire (yellow card) 78'	Report	16' Trippier; 47' Ings; (yellow card) 60' Grant; 74', 90+3', 90+6' (yellow card) 90+4' Austin; (yellow card) 78' Marney	Stadium: Fratton Park; Attendance: 15,739; Referee: Attwell

7 April 2012 Round 41	Southampton	2–2	Portsmouth	Southampton
13:00	Schneiderlin (yellow card) 2'; Sharp 27', 89' (yellow card) 28'	Report	(yellow card) 7' (goal) 36' Maguire; (yellow card) 27' Rocha; (yellow card) 34' Allan; (yellow card) 68' Etuhu; 90+4' Norris; (yellow card) 90+7' Ashdown; (yellow card) 90+7' Varney	Stadium: St Mary's Stadium; Attendance: 31,743; Referee: Swarbrick

10 April 2012 Round 42	Portsmouth	0–1	Millwall	Portsmouth
19:45		Report	37' Kane; (yellow card) 83' Lowry	Stadium: Fratton Park; Attendance: 15,837; Referee: Mark Halsey

14 April 2012 Round 43	Doncaster	3–4	Portsmouth	Doncaster
15:00	Beye 3' (red card) 57'; Robert 5'; Coppinger 67'	Report	59' (pen.), 65' (pen.) Halford; 90' Kitson; 90+3' Futacs	Stadium: Keepmoat Stadium; Attendance: 8,196; Referee: Mick Russell

17 April 2012 Round 44	Portsmouth	2–1	Crystal Palace	Portsmouth
19:45	Allan 32'; Halford 55'; Norris (yellow card) 74'	Report	71' (pen.) Ambrose	Stadium: Fratton Park; Attendance: 14,847; Referee: Simon Hooper

21 April 2012 Round 45	Portsmouth	1–2	Derby County	Portsmouth
15:00	Kitson (yellow card) 42'; Varney (yellow card) 55' (goal) 74'; Pearce (yellow card) 65'	Report	40' Buxton; (yellow card) 65' (goal) 78' (pen.) Davies	Stadium: Fratton Park; Attendance: 17,707; Referee: Naylor

28 April 2012 Round 46	Nottingham Forest	2–0	Portsmouth	Nottingham
12:30	Blackstock 70', 89'; Lynch (yellow card) 84'	Report	(yellow card) 35' Mokoena; (yellow card) 80' Maguire	Stadium: City Ground; Attendance: 23,625; Referee: Haywood

==== Football League Cup ====
8 August 2011 First Round	Portsmouth	0–1	Barnet	Portsmouth
19:45 BST	Ward (yellow card) 36'; Williams (yellow card) 80'; Halford (yellow card) 88'	Report	30' Hughes	Stadium: Fratton Park; Attendance: 4,464; Referee: Darren Sheldrake

==== FA Cup ====
8 January 2012 Third Round	Chelsea	4–0	Portsmouth	London
15:00 BST	Malouda (yellow card) 40'; Mata 48'; Terry (yellow card) 75'; Ramires 85', 87'; Raul Meireles (yellow card) 90+2'; Lampard 90+3'	Report	(yellow card) 37' Pearce; (yellow card) 44' Halford; (yellow card) 76' Williams; (yellow card) 81' Kitson	Stadium: Stamford Bridge; Attendance: 41,529; Referee: Taylor
