= George Thorne (footballer) =

English footballer

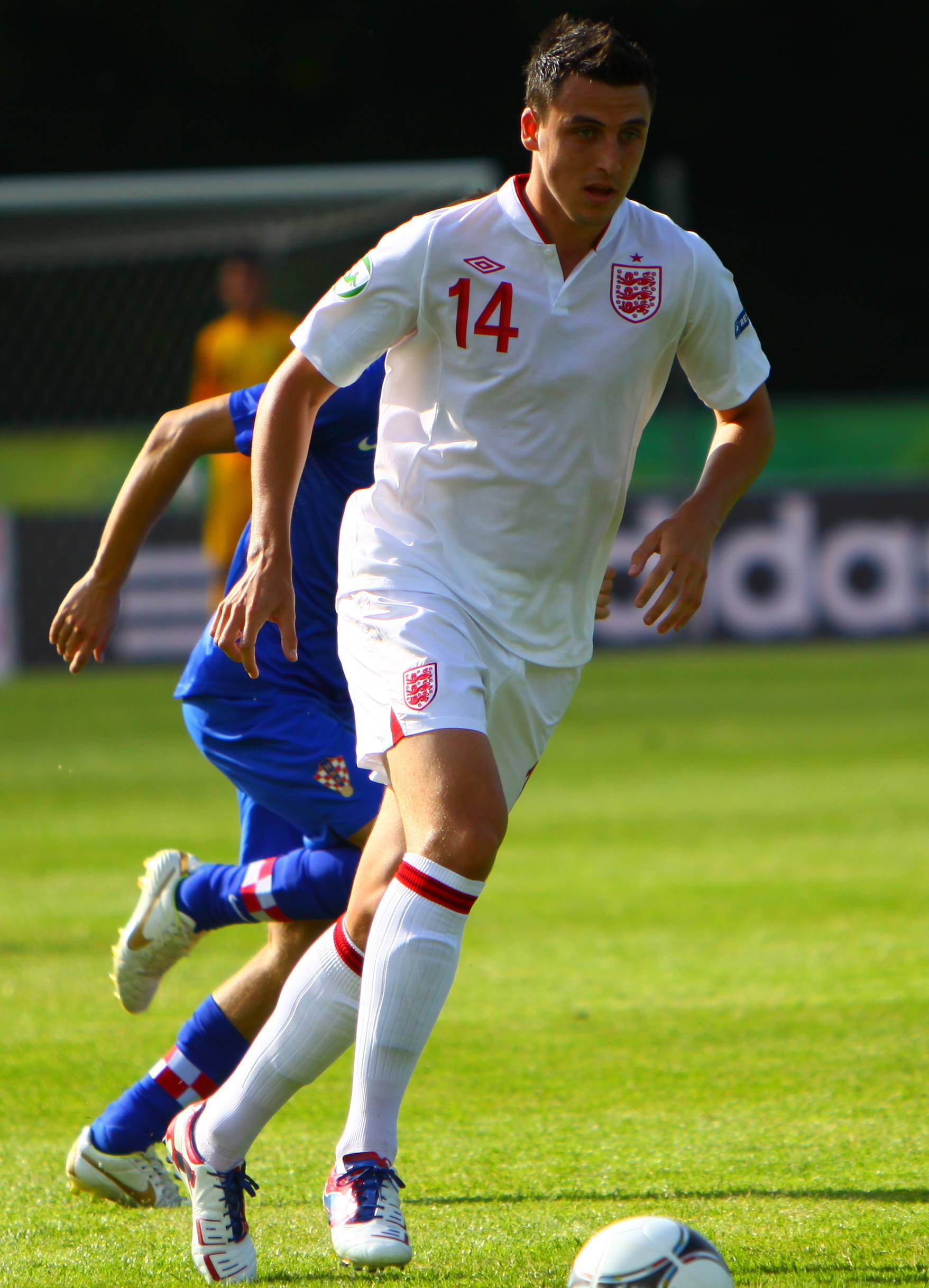

Personal information
- Full name: George Louis Elliot Thorne
- Date of birth: 4 January 1993 (age 33)
- Place of birth: Chatham, England
- Height: 1.88 m (6 ft 2 in)
- Position: Midfielder

Team information
- Current team: Cambridge United (emerging talent coach)

Youth career
- 2004–2009: West Bromwich Albion

Senior career*
Years	Team	Apps	(Gls)
2009–2014	West Bromwich Albion	10	(0)
2011	→ Portsmouth (loan)	4	(0)
2012	→ Portsmouth (loan)	10	(0)
2012	→ Peterborough United (loan)	7	(1)
2013–2014	→ Watford (loan)	8	(0)
2014	→ Derby County (loan)	9	(1)
2014–2020	Derby County	57	(2)
2019	→ Luton Town (loan)	3	(0)
2019–2020	→ Oxford United (loan)	1	(0)
2020	Oxford United	3	(0)
2022–2023	Bedford Town	15	(0)
Total		127	(4)

International career
2009	England U16	2	(0)
2009–2010	England U17	13	(0)
2011	England U18	1	(0)
2010–2012	England U19	20	(1)
Medal record
Men's football
Representing England
UEFA European Under-17 Championship
Winner	2010 Liechtenstein
- * Club domestic league appearances and goals as of 20:09, 17 November 2024 (UTC)

George Louis Elliot Thorne (born 4 January 1993) is an English former footballer who played as a midfielder. He is currently Emerging Talent Coach at Cambridge United.

== Club career ==
=== West Bromwich Albion ===
Born in Chatham, Thorne joined West Bromwich Albion's Academy in 2005, having been one of the many talented youngsters who were left without a club when Cambridge United's youth scheme closed. He made his debut in a 4–0 win over Sheffield Wednesday in 2009–10, coming off the bench for Simon Cox. At 16 years, 328 days, this made him the youngest player to represent Albion in a senior competitive match since Bobby Hope in April 1960. In January 2010, Thorne signed his first professional contract with Albion, doing so prior to the club's home game with Nottingham Forest.

==== Portsmouth (loan) ====
On 24 November 2011, Thorne joined Championship team Portsmouth on loan until 2 January 2012, alongside Joe Mattock. He made his début two days later, starting in a 1–1 draw against Leicester City at Fratton Park. On 20 December 2011, he was recalled along with two other players also on loan at other clubs due to an injury crisis. On 18 February 2012, he rejoined Portsmouth on loan. He made his second debut in a 2–0 defeat against Barnsley the same day. On 30 March, he suffered an ankle injury in the game against Burnley, being ruled out for the rest of the season, and returning to West Brom.

==== Peterborough United (loan) ====
On 21 November 2012, he joined Peterborough United on loan until January. He made his debut three days later, helping Peterborough secure a 1–1 draw away to Ipswich Town. He scored his first goal on 22 December in a 5–4 win against Bolton Wanderers.

==== Return to West Brom ====
On 28 December 2012, West Brom manager Steve Clarke recalled Thorne from Peterborough. Two days later, Thorne started in central midfield in a Premier League clash with Manchester United.

==== Watford (loan) ====
On 6 November 2013, Thorne went out on loan to Watford until 2 January 2014.

==== Derby County (loan) ====
On 30 January 2014, Thorne went out on loan to Derby County for the remainder of the 2013–14 season. Thorne's first appearance for Derby County came in their 5–0 win against rivals Nottingham Forest in March 2014. He scored his first goal for Derby against Doncaster on 18 April 2014. He played his final game of the loan spell for the Rams in the Championship Play-off Final at Wembley, where his side lost 1–0 to QPR.

=== Derby County ===
On 18 July 2014, Derby County agreed a fee with West Bromwich Albion for Thorne. The following day, after agreeing personal terms and passing a medical, Thorne joined Derby on a four-year contract. It is predicted the fee was between £2.6 million and £3.2 million.

On 22 July 2014, Thorne suffered a cruciate knee ligament injury during a friendly match against Zenit Saint Petersburg and was ruled out of football for up to nine months.

Having fought hard to get back to fitness and into the first team again, on 7 May 2016, Thorne suffered a broken leg during the final league game of the season against Ipswich Town and was ruled out of football for over a year. This was due to a number of complications during operations and his recovery, and despite having the ability and football brain, he was physically not the same player after this injury.

Thorne joined League One club Luton Town on 7 January 2019 on loan until the end of 2018–19.

=== Oxford United ===
He joined another League One club, Oxford United, on 19 August 2019 on loan until January 2020. The loan was made permanent on 22 January 2020, with Thorne signing a contract until the end of the 2019–20 season. In August 2020, Oxford announced that Thorne has been released by mutual consent.

=== Bedford Town ===
On 12 September 2022, Thorne signed for Southern League Premier Division Central club Bedford Town.

== International career ==
Thorne was called up to England Under-16 on 23 October 2008 for the Victory Shield, in which England had to face Wales U16. He made his England U16 debut, coming on in the 58th minute and making an assist for England. In May 2010, Thorne helped the under-17 team win their first ever European Championship, coming off the bench in the final as England triumphed 2–1 over Spain.

== Coaching career ==
In May 2023, Thorne was appointed assistant manager of United Counties League Premier Division South side St Neots Town. After just a few months, he departed the club.

In September 2025, Thorne was appointed Emerging Talent Coach at League Two club Cambridge United.

== Personal life ==
Thorne announced his retirement from full time professional football during a BBC Radio Derby commentary on 23 August 2022, he cited his multiple injuries, mental health and family as the main factors of his decision.

== Career statistics ==
As of match played 25 February 2020

Appearances and goals by club, season and competition
Club	Season	League			FA Cup		League Cup		Other		Total	
Club	Season	Division	Apps	Goals	Apps	Goals	Apps	Goals	Apps	Goals	Apps	Goals
West Bromwich Albion	2009–10	Championship	1	0	0	0	0	0	—		1	0
West Bromwich Albion	2010–11	Premier League	1	0	0	0	0	0	—		1	0
West Bromwich Albion	2011–12	Premier League	3	0	1	0	2	0	—		6	0
West Bromwich Albion	2012–13	Premier League	5	0	2	0	2	0	—		9	0
West Bromwich Albion	2013–14	Premier League	0	0	0	0	0	0	—		0	0
West Bromwich Albion	Total		10	0	3	0	4	0	—		17	0
Portsmouth (loan)	2011–12	Championship	14	0	—		—		—		14	0
Peterborough United (loan)	2012–13	Championship	7	1	—		—		—		7	1
Watford (loan)	2013–14	Championship	8	0	—		—		—		8	0
Derby County (loan)	2013–14	Championship	9	1	—		—		3 (Note: Appearances in Championship play-offs)	1	12	2
Derby County	2014–15	Championship	3	0	0	0	0	0	—		3	0
Derby County	2015–16	Championship	34	2	1	1	1	0	0	0	36	3
Derby County	2016–17	Championship	0	0	0	0	0	0	—		0	0
Derby County	2017–18	Championship	20	0	1	0	1	0	0	0	22	0
Derby County	2018–19	Championship	0	0	0	0	0	0	—		0	0
Derby County	2019–20	Championship	0	0	—		0	0	—		0	0
Derby County	Total		66	3	2	1	2	0	3	1	73	5
Luton Town (loan)	2018–19	League One	3	0	—		—		—		3	0
Oxford United	2019–20	League One	4	0	1	0	2	0	0	0	7	0
Career total			112	4	6	1	8	0	3	1	129	6

== Honours ==
England U17

- UEFA European Under-17 Football Championship champions: 2010
