= 2014–15 Crystal Palace F.C. season =

English football club season

Crystal Palace
2014–15 season
- Co-chairmen: Stephen Browett; Steve Parish
- Manager: Keith Millen (caretaker, until 27 August 2014); Neil Warnock (until 27 December 2014); Keith Millen (caretaker, until 2 January 2015); Alan Pardew (from 2 January 2015)
- Stadium: Selhurst Park
- Premier League: 10th
- FA Cup: Fifth round
- League Cup: Third round
- Top goalscorer: League: Glenn Murray (7); All: Dwight Gayle (10)
- Highest home attendance: 25,197 (vs. Everton, 31 January 2015)
- Lowest home attendance: 13,773 (vs. Newcastle United, 24 September 2014)
- Average home league attendance: 24,421
Home colours	Away colours	Third colours

The 2014–15 season was Crystal Palace's second consecutive season back in the Premier League, and was also the first time they had ever been in the Premier League for two seasons in a row. Palace also competed in the League Cup and the FA Cup.

== Summary ==
=== Management ===
Crystal Palace began the season under the management of Neil Warnock who returned to the club for his second spell in charge following the departure of Tony Pulis less than 48 hours before the season began. However Warnock's tenure would only last until 27 December when he was sacked from his position as manager, with former Palace player Alan Pardew being appointed as his replacement on 3 January 2015.

== Match details ==
=== Pre-season and friendlies ===
16 July 2014	Grazer AK	1–13	Crystal Palace	Graz, Austria
18:00 BST	Sacher 59'	Report	Ledley 5', 71'; Bolasie 12' (pen.); Murray 18', 36'; Thomas 45'; Dobbie 62', 66', 67', 81'; Chamakh 76'; Jo. Williams 79', 90'	Stadium: UPC-Arena

23 July 2014	Columbus Crew	2–2	Crystal Palace	Columbus, Ohio, United States
19:30 EDT; 00:30 BST	Bedell 15'; Paladini 80'	Report	Murray 36'; Gray 70'	Stadium: Columbus Crew Stadium

26 July 2014	Philadelphia Union	0–1	Crystal Palace	Chester, Pennsylvania, United States
00:00 BST		Report	White 20' (o.g.)	Stadium: PPL Park

28 July 2014	Richmond Kickers	0–3	Crystal Palace	Richmond, Virginia, United States
19:30 EST		Report	Ramage 35'; Murray 52'; Chamakh 70'	Stadium: City Stadium; Attendance: 7,851; Referee: Matt Gorak

2 August 2014	Brentford	3–2	Crystal Palace	Brentford, England
15:00 BST	Douglas 48'; Gray 55'; Odubajo 75'	Report	Murray 56'; Chamakh 57'	Stadium: Griffin Park; Attendance: 3,624 (1,527 Palace fans)

9 August 2014	FC Augsburg	0-0	Crystal Palace	Augsburg, Germany
13:30 UTC		Report		Stadium: Augsburg Arena

26 May 2015 Julian Speroni Testimonial	Crystal Palace	4–3	Dundee	London
19:45 BST	Bolasie 6'; Lee 23'; Gayle 30', 38'	Report	Carreiro 34'; Adam 85'; Kerr 86'	Stadium: Selhurst Park; Attendance: 11,509 (1,750 Dundee fans); Referee: Dermot Gallagher

=== Premier League ===
16 August 2014 1	Arsenal	2–1	Crystal Palace	London
17:30 BST	Chambers (yellow card) 45'; Koscielny 45+1'; Cazorla (yellow card) 60'; Ramsey 90+1'	Report	Hangeland 35'; Puncheon (yellow card) 48' (yellow-red card) 89'; Chamakh (yellow card) 68'; Kelly (yellow card) 77'	Stadium: Emirates Stadium; Attendance: 59,962; Referee: Jonathan Moss

23 August 2014 2	Crystal Palace	1–3	West Ham United	London
15:00 BST	Chamakh 48'; Jedinak (yellow card) 89'	Report	Zárate 34'; Downing 37'; Reid (yellow card) 40'; Tomkins (yellow card) 45+1'; Cole 62'; O'Brien (yellow card) 75'	Stadium: Selhurst Park; Attendance: 24,242; Referee: Mark Clattenburg

30 August 2014 3	Newcastle United	3–3	Crystal Palace	Newcastle
15:00 BST	Janmaat 37'; Aarons 73', (yellow card) 90+7'; Williamson 88'	Report	Gayle 1'; Mariappa (yellow card) 41'; Chamakh (yellow card) 44'; Puncheon 48'; Murray (yellow card) 88'; Zaha 90+5'	Stadium: St James' Park; Attendance: 49,226; Referee: Mike Jones

13 September 2014 4	Crystal Palace	0–0	Burnley	London
15:00 BST	Puncheon (yellow card) 56'; Jedinak (yellow card) 84'	Report	Ings (yellow card) 4'; Sordell (yellow card) 53'; Boyd (yellow card) 90+2'	Stadium: Selhurst Park; Attendance: 23,829; Referee: Mike Dean

21 September 2014 5	Everton	2–3	Crystal Palace	Liverpool
15:00 BST	Lukaku 9'; Eto'o (yellow card) 56'; Naismith (yellow card) 77'; Baines 83' (pen.)	Report	Jedinak 30' (pen.); Campbell 54'; Bolasie 69'; Puncheon (yellow card) 76'; Speroni (yellow card) 89'	Stadium: Goodison Park; Attendance: 37,574; Referee: Michael Oliver

27 September 2014 6	Crystal Palace	2–0	Leicester City	London
15:00 BST	Campbell 51'; Jedinak 54'	Report	Simpson (yellow card) 85'; Vardy (yellow card) 90+5'	Stadium: Selhurst Park; Attendance: 24,311; Referee: Keith Stroud

4 October 2014 7	Hull City	2–0	Crystal Palace	Hull
15:00 BST	Livermore (yellow card) 35'; Diamé 60'; Jelavić 89'	Report	Campbell (yellow card) 44'; Mariappa (yellow card) 55'	Stadium: KC Stadium; Attendance: 24,281; Referee: Mike Dean

18 October 2014 8	Crystal Palace	1–2	Chelsea	London
15:00 BST	Delaney (yellow card) 30' (yellow-red card) 43'; Campbell (yellow card) 41', (goal) 90'	Report	Oscar 6'; Azpilicueta (red card) 40'; Fàbregas (yellow card) 41', (goal) 51'	Stadium: Selhurst Park; Attendance: 24,451; Referee: Craig Pawson

25 October 2014 9	West Bromwich Albion	2–2	Crystal Palace	West Bromwich
15:00 BST	Sessègnon (yellow card) 45+3'; Anichebe 51'; Gardner (yellow card) 82'; Blanco (yellow card) 88'; Berahino 90+3' (pen.)	Report	Hangeland 16'; Jedinak 45+1' (pen.) (yellow card) 66'	Stadium: The Hawthorns; Attendance: 24,738; Referee: Mark Clattenburg

3 November 2014 10	Crystal Palace	1–3	Sunderland	London
20:00 GMT	Brown 55' (o.g.); Jedinak (yellow card) 65' (yellow-red card) 87'	Report	Fletcher 31', 90+5'; Buckley (yellow card) 63'; Pantilimon (yellow card) 71'; Cattermole (yellow card) 74'; Gómez 79'	Stadium: Selhurst Park; Attendance: 23,212; Referee: Phil Dowd

8 November 2014 11	Manchester United	1–0	Crystal Palace	Manchester
15:00 GMT	Mata 67'; Valencia (yellow card) 83'	Report	Ward (yellow card) 35'; Delaney (yellow card) 38'; Bolasie (yellow card) 64'	Stadium: Old Trafford; Attendance: 75,325; Referee: Chris Foy

23 November 2014 12	Crystal Palace	3–1	Liverpool	London
13:30 GMT	Gayle 17'; Ledley 78'; Jedinak 81'; Hangeland (yellow card) 84'	Report	Lambert 2'; Škrtel (yellow card) 53'; Manquillo (yellow card) 61'	Stadium: Selhurst Park; Attendance: 24,862; Referee: Jonathan Moss

29 November 2014 13	Swansea City	1–1	Crystal Palace	Swansea
15:00 GMT	Bony 15'	Report	Jedinak 25' (pen.); Chamakh (yellow card) 40'; McArthur (yellow card) 69'	Stadium: Liberty Stadium; Attendance: 20,240; Referee: Martin Atkinson

2 December 2014 14	Crystal Palace	0–1	Aston Villa	London
20:00 GMT	Campbell (yellow card) 57'; Bolasie (yellow card) 81'	Report	Benteke 32'; Clark (yellow card) 82'; Weimann (yellow card) 90+2'	Stadium: Selhurst Park; Attendance: 23,935; Referee: Michael Oliver

6 December 2014 15	Tottenham Hotspur	0–0	Crystal Palace	London
15:00 GMT	Eriksen (yellow card) 88'	Report		Stadium: White Hart Lane; Attendance: 35,860; Referee: Lee Mason

13 December 2014 16	Crystal Palace	1–1	Stoke City	London
15:00 GMT	McArthur 11'; Chamakh (yellow card) 67'; Dann (yellow card) 90'	Report	Crouch 13'	Stadium: Selhurst Park; Attendance: 23,038; Referee: Kevin Friend

20 December 2014 17	Manchester City	3–0	Crystal Palace	Manchester
12:45 GMT	Kolarov (yellow card) 36'; Silva 49', 61'; Milner (yellow card) 79'; Touré 81'	Report	Puncheon (yellow card) 41'	Stadium: Etihad Stadium; Attendance: 45,302; Referee: Phil Dowd

26 December 2014 18	Crystal Palace	1–3	Southampton	London
15:00 GMT	Delaney (yellow card) 77'; Dann 86'	Report	Mané 17'; Bertrand 48'; Alderweireld 53'	Stadium: Selhurst Park; Attendance: 24,565; Referee: Mike Dean

28 December 2014 19	Queens Park Rangers	0–0	Crystal Palace	London
15:00 GMT	Hill (yellow card) 45+1'; Barton (yellow card) 62'	Report	Puncheon (yellow card) 72'	Stadium: Loftus Road; Attendance: 18,011; Referee: Mike Jones

1 January 2015 20	Aston Villa	0–0	Crystal Palace	Birmingham
15:00 GMT	Clark (yellow card) 78'	Report	Delaney (yellow card) 86'	Stadium: Villa Park; Attendance: 29,047; Referee: Robert Madley

10 January 2015 21	Crystal Palace	2–1	Tottenham Hotspur	London
17:30 GMT	Bannan (yellow card) 37'; Dann (yellow card) 45+1'; Gayle 69' (pen.); Puncheon (yellow card) 77', (goal) 80'; Campbell (yellow card) 90+2'; Guedioura (yellow card) 90+3'	Report	Townsend (yellow card) 25'; Kane 49'; Stambouli (yellow card) 55'; Fazio (yellow card) 90+2'	Stadium: Selhurst Park; Attendance: 24,193; Referee: Anthony Taylor

17 January 2015 22	Burnley	2–3	Crystal Palace	Burnley
15:00 GMT	Mee 12'; Ings 16'; Shackell (yellow card) 61'	Report	Dann (yellow card) 17'; Gayle 28', 87'; Puncheon 48'; Sanogo (yellow card) 74'; Ward (yellow card) 77'	Stadium: Turf Moor; Attendance: 17,782; Referee: Phil Dowd

31 January 2015 23	Crystal Palace	0–1	Everton	London
15:00 GMT		Report	Lukaku 2'; Oviedo (yellow card) 80'; Robles (yellow card) 90+1'; Baines (yellow card) 90+1'	Stadium: Selhurst Park; Attendance: 25,197; Referee: Roger East

7 February 2015 24	Leicester City	0–1	Crystal Palace	Leicester
15:00 GMT	Schlupp (yellow card) 9'; Simpson (yellow card) 32'; Ulloa (yellow card) 79'; Konchesky (yellow card) 90+4'	Report	Ledley 55'; Kelly (yellow card) 82'	Stadium: King Power Stadium; Attendance: 31,695; Referee: Lee Mason

11 February 2015 25	Crystal Palace	1–1	Newcastle United	London
19:45 GMT	McArthur (yellow card) 49'; Campbell 71'	Report	Cissé 42'; Janmaat (yellow card) 54'; Colback (yellow card) 55'	Stadium: Selhurst Park; Attendance: 25,118; Referee: Andre Marriner

21 February 2015 26	Crystal Palace	1–2	Arsenal	London
15:00 GMT	Mutch (yellow card) 14'; Murray 90+4'	Report	Cazorla 8' (pen.); Coquelin (yellow card) 28'; Giroud 45+1', (yellow card) 56'; Chambers (yellow card) 85'	Stadium: Selhurst Park; Attendance: 24,721; Referee: Mark Clattenburg

28 February 2015 27	West Ham United	1–3	Crystal Palace	London
12:45 GMT	Tomkins (yellow card) 59'; Valencia (yellow card) 65' (goal) 76'	Report	Murray (yellow card) 23' (yellow-red card) 69' (goal) 41', 63'; Dann 51'; Ward (yellow card) 53'; Delaney (yellow card) 84'	Stadium: Boleyn Ground; Attendance: 34,857; Referee: Mike Dean

3 March 2015 28	Southampton	1–0	Crystal Palace	Southampton
19:45 GMT	Mané 83'	Report	McArthur (yellow card) 30'; Delaney (yellow card) 90+3'	Stadium: St Mary's Stadium; Attendance: 28,351; Referee: Martin Atkinson

14 March 2015 29	Crystal Palace	3–1	Queens Park Rangers	London
12:45 GMT	Zaha 21'; McArthur 40'; Ward 42'; Murray (yellow card) 59'	Report	Henry (yellow card) 30'; Sandro (yellow card) 53'; Onuoha (yellow card) 76'; Phillips 83'	Stadium: Selhurst Park; Attendance: 24,886; Referee: Lee Mason

21 March 2015 30	Stoke City	1–2	Crystal Palace	Stoke
15:00 GMT	Diouf 14'; Begović (yellow card) 40'; Adam (yellow card) 42'; Pieters (yellow card) 45'	Report	Zaha (yellow card) 33'; Murray 41' (pen.); Zaha 45+2'; McArthur (yellow card) 49'; Souaré (yellow card) 67'; Gayle (yellow card) 88'	Stadium: Britannia Stadium; Attendance: 27,532; Referee: Andre Marriner

6 April 2015 31	Crystal Palace	2–1	Manchester City	London
20:00 BST	Murray 34'; Delaney (yellow card) 40'; Puncheon 48', (yellow card) 57'	Report	Demichelis (yellow card) 68'; Touré 78'	Stadium: Selhurst Park; Attendance: 24,718; Referee: Michael Oliver

11 April 2015 32	Sunderland	1–4	Crystal Palace	Sunderland
14:00 GMT	Rodwell (yellow card) 16'; Cattermole (yellow card) 24'; Wickham 90'	Report	Dann (yellow card) 18'; Murray 48'; Bolasie 51', 53', 62'; McArthur (yellow card) 67'	Stadium: Stadium of Light; Attendance: 42,073; Referee: Anthony Taylor

18 April 2015 33	Crystal Palace	0–2	West Bromwich Albion	London
15:00 BST	Dann (yellow card) 54'; Puncheon (yellow card) 61'; Bolasie (yellow card) 69'	Report	Morrison 2'; McAuley (yellow card) 14'; Gardner 53', (yellow card) 79'; Brunt (yellow card) 79'	Stadium: Selhurst Park; Attendance: 24,765; Referee: Jonathan Moss

25 April 2015 34	Crystal Palace	0–2	Hull City	London
15:00 BST		Report	N'Doye 51', 90+2'	Stadium: Selhurst Park; Attendance: 23,876; Referee: Mark Clattenburg

3 May 2015 35	Chelsea	1–0	Crystal Palace	London
13:30 BST	Ivanović (yellow card) 27'; Terry (yellow card) 38'; Hazard 45'	Report	Dann (yellow card) 23'; Mariappa (yellow card) 45'	Stadium: Stamford Bridge; Attendance: 41,566; Referee: Kevin Friend

9 May 2015 36	Crystal Palace	1–2	Manchester United	London
17:30 BST	Puncheon 57'	Report	Mata 19' (pen.); Herrera (yellow card) 55'; Fellaini 78'	Stadium: Selhurst Park; Attendance: 25,009; Referee: Michael Oliver

16 May 2015 37	Liverpool	1–3	Crystal Palace	Liverpool
17:30 BST	Lallana 26'; Can (yellow card) 42'; Coutinho (yellow card) 87'	Report	Puncheon 43'; Zaha 60'; Ward (yellow card) 79'; McArthur (yellow card) 83'; Mutch (yellow card) 85'; Murray 90'	Stadium: Anfield; Attendance: 44,673; Referee: Jonathan Moss

24 May 2015 38	Crystal Palace	1–0	Swansea City	London
15:00 BST	Chamakh 57'; Murray (yellow card) 89'; Campbell (yellow card) 90+1'; Hangeland (yellow card) 90+2'	Report		Stadium: Selhurst Park; Attendance: 25,076; Referee: Craig Pawson

=== FA Cup ===
4 January 2015 Third round	Dover Athletic	0–4	Crystal Palace	Dover
13:00 GMT	Essam (yellow card) 45'	Report	Dann 10', 34'; Gayle 68'; Doyle 87'	Stadium: Crabble Athletic Ground; Attendance: 5,645; Referee: Andre Marriner

24 January 2015 Fourth round	Southampton	2–3	Crystal Palace	Southampton
15:00 GMT	Pellè 9'; Dann 16' (o.g.); Gardoș (yellow card) 45+2'; Targett (yellow card) 52'; Clyne (yellow card) 69'; Fonte (yellow card) 78'	Report	Chamakh 11', 39', (yellow card) 42'; Sanogo 21'	Stadium: St Mary's Stadium; Attendance: 31,320; Referee: Jonathan Moss

14 February 2015 Fifth round	Crystal Palace	1–2	Liverpool	Selhurst
17:30 GMT	Campbell 15'; Chamakh (yellow card) 36'	Report	Henderson (yellow card) 29'; Sturridge 49'; Lallana 58'; Can (yellow card) 74'; Mignolet (yellow card) 90+2'	Stadium: Selhurst Park; Attendance: 20,391; Referee: Robert Madley

=== League Cup ===
26 August 2014 Round Two	Walsall	0–3	Crystal Palace	Walsall
19:45 BST		Report	Gayle 7', 25', 41'	Stadium: Bescot Stadium; Attendance: 3,987; Referee: Darren Drysdale

24 September 2014 Round Three	Crystal Palace	2–3 (a.e.t.)	Newcastle United	Selhurst
19:45 BST	Gayle 25' (pen.); Kaikai 90'; Bannan (yellow card) 105'	Report	Rivière 36', 48' (pen.); Haïdara (yellow card) 73'; Abeid (yellow card) 90' (yellow-red card) 100'; Elliot (yellow card) 90+2'; Dummett 112'	Stadium: Selhurst Park; Attendance: 13,773; Referee: Robert Madley

== Statistics ==
=== Appearances and goals ===
As of 24 May 2015

No.	Pos	Nat	Player	Total		Premier League		FA Cup		League Cup	
No.	Pos	Nat	Player	Apps	Goals	Apps	Goals	Apps	Goals	Apps	Goals
1	GK	(Argentina) ARG	Julián Speroni	37	0	36	0	1	0	0	0
2	DF	(England) ENG	Joel Ward	40	1	37	1	3	0	0	0
3	DF	(Jamaica) JAM	Adrian Mariappa	16	0	8+4	0	0+2	0	2	0
4	DF	(Norway) NOR	Brede Hangeland	17	2	12+2	2	1	0	1+1	0
6	DF	(England) ENG	Scott Dann	37	4	34	2	3	2	0	0
7	MF	(Democratic Republic of the Congo) COD	Yannick Bolasie	34	4	31+3	4	0	0	0	0
9	FW	(France) FRA	Yaya Sanogo (on loan from Arsenal)	11	1	3+7	0	1	1	0	0
10	FW	(England) ENG	Fraizer Campbell	22	5	13+7	4	2	1	0	0
11	MF	(England) ENG	Wilfried Zaha	35	4	23+8	4	2+1	0	1	0
13	GK	(Wales) WAL	Wayne Hennessey	7	0	2+1	0	2	0	2	0
14	MF	(England) ENG	Jerome Thomas	3	0	0+1	0	0+1	0	1	0
15	MF	(Australia) AUS	Mile Jedinak	24	5	24	5	0	0	0	0
16	FW	(England) ENG	Dwight Gayle	29	10	11+14	5	2	1	2	4
17	FW	(England) ENG	Glenn Murray	20	7	9+8	7	1+1	0	1	0
18	MF	(Scotland) SCO	James McArthur	33	2	29+3	2	1	0	0	0
22	MF	(England) ENG	Jordon Mutch	7	0	4+3	0	0	0	0	0
23	FW	(Nigeria) NGA	Shola Ameobi	4	0	0+4	0	0	0	0	0
24	MF	(South Korea) KOR	Lee Chung-yong	3	0	1+2	0	0	0	0	0
26	GK	(Scotland) SCO	Chris Kettings	0	0	0	0	0	0	0	0
27	DF	(Republic of Ireland) IRL	Damien Delaney	32	0	28+1	0	2	0	1	0
28	MF	(Wales) WAL	Joe Ledley	35	2	30+2	2	3	0	0	0
29	FW	(Morocco) MAR	Marouane Chamakh	20	4	15+3	2	2	2	0	0
34	DF	(England) ENG	Martin Kelly	34	0	27+4	0	3	0	0	0
36	MF	(England) ENG	Hiram Boateng	0	0	0	0	0	0	0	0
40	DF	(Senegal) SEN	Pape Souaré	10	0	7+2	0	1	0	0	0
42	MF	(England) ENG	Jason Puncheon	39	6	31+6	6	0+2	0	0	0
	MF	(England) ENG	Kyle De Silva	0	0	0	0	0	0	0	0
Players who left the club during the season:
9	FW	(Republic of Ireland) IRL	Kevin Doyle (on loan from Wolverhampton Wanderers)	5	1	0+3	0	0+1	1	1	0
12	MF	(England) ENG	Stuart O'Keefe	3	0	1+1	0	1	0	0	0
17	FW	(England) ENG	Andrew Johnson	1	0	0	0	0	0	0+1	0
	DF	(England) ENG	Alex Wynter	0	0	0	0	0	0	0	0
	MF	(Mali) MLI	Jimmy Kébé	0	0	0	0	0	0	0	0
Players out on loan:
5	DF	(Republic of Ireland) IRL	Paddy McCarthy (on loan to Bolton Wanderers)	2	0	0	0	0	0	2	0
8	MF	(Algeria) ALG	Adlène Guedioura (on loan to Watford)	10	0	0+7	0	0+1	0	2	0
19	DF	(England) ENG	Zeki Fryers (on loan to Ipswich Town)	2	0	0+1	0	0	0	1	0
20	MF	(Wales) WAL	Jonathan Williams (on loan to Ipswich Town)	4	0	0+2	0	0	0	2	0
21	DF	(England) ENG	Jerome Williams (on loan to Southend United)	1	0	0	0	0	0	1	0
22	DF	(England) ENG	Jack Hunt (on loan to Rotherham United)	0	0	0	0	0	0	0	0
25	MF	(Scotland) SCO	Barry Bannan (on loan to Bolton Wanderers)	10	0	2+5	0	1	0	2	0
32	FW	(Ghana) GHA	Kwesi Appiah (on loan to Reading)	0	0	0	0	0	0	0	0
35	MF	(Republic of Ireland) IRL	Owen Garvan (on loan to Bolton Wanderers)	1	0	0	0	0	0	0+1	0
37	MF	(England) ENG	Sullay Kaikai (on loan to Cambridge United)	1	1	0	0	0	0	0+1	1
38	FW	(England) ENG	Jake Gray (on loan to Cheltenham Town)	2	0	0	0	0	0	0+2	0
45	DF	(England) ENG	Ryan Inniss (on loan to Port Vale)	0	0	0	0	0	0	0	0
	GK	(Wales) WAL	Lewis Price (on loan to Crawley Town)	0	0	0	0	0	0	0	0
	DF	(England) ENG	Peter Ramage (on loan to Barnsley)	0	0	0	0	0	0	0	0
	FW	(Scotland) SCO	Stephen Dobbie (on loan to Fleetwood Town)	0	0	0	0	0	0	0	0

=== Goalscorers ===
As of 24 May 2015

No.	Pos.	Name	Premier League	FA Cup	League Cup	Total
2	DF	Joel Ward	1	0	0	1
4	DF	Brede Hangeland	2	0	0	2
6	DF	Scott Dann	2	2	0	4
7	MF	Yannick Bolasie	4	0	0	4
~~9~~	FW	Kevin Doyle	0	1	0	1
9	FW	Yaya Sanogo	0	1	0	1
10	FW	Fraizer Campbell	4	1	0	5
11	MF	Wilfried Zaha	4	0	0	4
15	MF	Mile Jedinak	5	0	0	5
16	ST	Dwight Gayle	5	1	4	10
17	FW	Glenn Murray	7	0	0	7
18	MF	James McArthur	2	0	0	2
28	MF	Joe Ledley	2	0	0	2
29	ST	Marouane Chamakh	2	2	0	4
37	MF	Sullay Kaikai	0	0	1	1
42	MF	Jason Puncheon	6	0	0	6
-	-	Own goal	1	0	0	1
Total			47	8	5	60

=== Disciplinary record ===
As of 24 May 2015

No.	Pos.	Name	Premier League			FA Cup			League Cup			Total		
No.	Pos.	Name	Booked	(yellow card) (yellow-red card)	Sent off (straight red)	Booked	(yellow card) (yellow-red card)	Sent off (straight red)	Booked	(yellow card) (yellow-red card)	Sent off (straight red)	Booked	(yellow card) (yellow-red card)	Sent off (straight red)
1	GK	Julián Speroni	1	0	0	0	0	0	0	0	0	1	0	0
2	DF	Joel Ward	4	0	0	0	0	0	0	0	0	4	0	0
3	DF	Adrian Mariappa	3	0	0	0	0	0	0	0	0	3	0	0
4	DF	Brede Hangeland	2	0	0	0	0	0	0	0	0	2	0	0
6	DF	Scott Dann	6	0	0	0	0	0	0	0	0	6	0	0
7	MF	Yannick Bolasie	3	0	0	0	0	0	0	0	0	3	0	0
8	MF	Adlène Guedioura	1	0	0	0	0	0	0	0	0	1	0	0
9	FW	Yaya Sanogo	1	0	0	0	0	0	0	0	0	1	0	0
10	FW	Fraizer Campbell	5	0	0	0	0	0	0	0	0	5	0	0
11	MF	Wilfried Zaha	1	0	0	0	0	0	0	0	0	1	0	0
15	MF	Mile Jedinak	3	1	0	0	0	0	0	0	0	3	1	0
16	FW	Dwight Gayle	1	0	0	0	0	0	0	0	0	1	0	0
17	FW	Glenn Murray	3	1	0	0	0	0	0	0	0	3	1	0
18	MF	James McArthur	6	0	0	0	0	0	0	0	0	6	0	0
22	MF	Jordon Mutch	2	0	0	0	0	0	0	0	0	2	0	0
25	MF	Barry Bannan	1	0	0	0	0	0	1	0	0	2	0	0
27	DF	Damien Delaney	6	1	0	0	0	0	0	0	0	6	1	0
29	FW	Marouane Chamakh	4	0	0	2	0	0	0	0	0	6	0	0
34	DF	Martin Kelly	2	0	0	0	0	0	0	0	0	2	0	0
40	DF	Pape Souaré	1	0	0	0	0	0	0	0	0	1	0	0
42	MF	Jason Puncheon	7	1	0	0	0	0	0	0	0	7	1	0
Total			63	4	0	2	0	0	1	0	0	66	4	0

==== League table ====
Pos	Team	Pld	W	D	L	GF	GA	GD	Pts	Qualification or relegation
8	Swansea City	38	16	8	14	46	49	−3	56	
9	Stoke City	38	15	9	14	48	45	+3	54	
10	Crystal Palace	38	13	9	16	47	51	−4	48	
11	Everton	38	12	11	15	48	50	−2	47	
12	West Ham United	38	12	11	15	44	47	−3	47	Qualification for the Europa League first qualifying round (Note: England was given an extra qualification berth for the Europa League first qualifying round as one of the top three associations in UEFA Respect Fair Play ranking. The spot was given to West Ham United after finishing on top of the Premier League Fair Play table.)

Source: Barclays Premier League
Rules for classification: 1) Points; 2) Goal difference; 3) Goals scored; 4) Play-offs (only if needed to decide champion, teams for relegation or teams for UEFA competitions).

==== Results summary ====
Overall								Home						Away					
Pld	W	D	L	GF	GA	GD	Pts	W	D	L	GF	GA	GD	W	D	L	GF	GA	GD
38	13	9	16	47	51	−4	48	6	3	10	21	27	−6	7	6	6	26	24	+2

Last updated: 25 May 2015.
Source: Premier League

==== Results by matchday ====
Matchday	1	2	3	4	5	6	7	8	9	10	11	12	13	14	15	16	17	18	19	20	21	22	23	24	25	26	27	28	29	30	31	32	33	34	35	36	37	38
Ground	A	H	A	H	A	H	A	H	A	H	A	H	A	H	A	H	A	H	A	A	H	A	H	A	H	H	A	A	H	A	H	A	H	H	A	H	A	H
Result	L	L	D	D	W	W	L	L	D	L	L	W	D	L	D	D	L	L	D	D	W	W	L	W	D	L	W	L	W	W	W	W	L	L	L	L	W	W
Position	16	19	19	17	15	9	14	16	15	17	17	15	14	15	15	16	17	18	18	18	15	12	13	13	13	13	12	12	12	11	11	11	11	11	12	12	12	10

Updated to match(es) played on 17 May 2015. Source: Statto.com
A = Away; H = Home; W = Win; D = Draw; L = Loss

== Transfers & loans ==
=== Transfer in ===
Pos:	Player	Transferred from	Fee	Date	Source
GK	(Scotland) Chris Kettings	(England) Blackpool	Free	19 June 2014	
FW	(England) Fraizer Campbell	(Wales) Cardiff	£900,000	24 July 2014	
DF	(Norway) Brede Hangeland	(England) Fulham	Free	1 August 2014	
DF	(England) Martin Kelly	(England) Liverpool	£1,500,000	14 August 2014	
DF	(England) Zeki Fryers	(England) Tottenham Hotspur	£1,500,000	1 September 2014	
MF	(Scotland) James McArthur	(England) Wigan Athletic	£5,500,000	1 September 2014	
FW	(England) Andrew Johnson	(England) Queens Park Rangers	Free	3 September 2014	
MF	(England) Jordon Mutch	(England) Queens Park Rangers	£4,750,000	29 January 2015	
FW	(Nigeria) Shola Ameobi	(Turkey) Gaziantep B.B.	Free	29 January 2015	
DF	(Senegal) Pape Souaré	(France) Lille	£3,000,000	30 January 2015	
MF	(England) Wilfried Zaha	(England) Manchester United	£3,500,000 (~ £6,000,000)	2 February 2015	
MF	(England) Keshi Anderson	(England) Barton Rovers	Undisclosed	2 February 2015	
MF	(South Korea) Lee Chung-yong	(England) Bolton Wanderers	Undisclosed (~ £1,500,000)	2 February 2015	

Total spending: ▼£20,650,000 (~ £24,650,000)

=== Loan in ===
Pos:	Player	Loaned from	Date	Loan expires	Source
FW	(England) Wilfried Zaha	(England) Manchester United	28 August 2014	2 February 2015	
FW	(Republic of Ireland) Kevin Doyle	(England) Wolverhampton Wanderers	1 September 2014	13 January 2015	
FW	(France) Yaya Sanogo	(England) Arsenal	13 January 2015	30 June 2015	

=== Transfer out ===
Pos:	Player	Transferred to	Fee	Date	Source
GK	(Scotland) Neil Alexander	(Scotland) Heart of Midlothian	Free	23 June 2014	
MF	(South Africa) Kagisho Dikgacoi	(Wales) Cardiff City	Free	23 May 2014	
GK	(England) Ross Fitzsimons	(England) Bolton Wanderers	Free	23 May 2014	
DF	(Wales) Danny Gabbidon	(Wales) Cardiff City	Free	23 May 2014	
DF	(England) Alastair Gordon	(England) Dover Athletic	Free	23 May 2014	
GK	(England) Thomas King	(England) Millwall	Free	23 May 2014	
DF	(England) Dean Moxey	(England) Bolton Wanderers	Free	23 May 2014	
DF	(Norway) Jonathan Parr	(England) Ipswich Town	Free	23 May 2014	
FW	(England) Ibra Sekajja	(Scotland) Inverness Caledonian Thistle	Free	23 May 2014	
FW	(Sweden) Osman Sow	(Scotland) Heart of Midlothian	Free	23 May 2014	
DF	(England) Quade Taylor	(England) Bolton Wanderers	Free	23 May 2014	
FW	(Ghana) Derek Tieku	(England) Walton Casuals	Free	23 May 2014	
FW	(England) Aaron Wilbraham	(England) Bristol City	Free	23 May 2014	
MF	(Spain) José Campaña	(Italy) Sampdoria	Undisclosed	22 July 2014	
FW	(England) Andrew Johnson	Released	Free	6 January 2015	
DF	(England) Alex Wynter	(England) Colchester United	Undisclosed	10 January 2015	
MF	(Mali) Jimmy Kébé	Released	Free	23 January 2015	
MF	(England) Stuart O'Keefe	(Wales) Cardiff City	Undisclosed	28 January 2015	

Total income: Undisclosed

=== Loan out ===
Pos:	Player	Loaned to	Date	Loan expires	Source
DF	(England) Alex Wynter	(England) Portsmouth	7 July 2014	10 January 2015	
FW	(England) Kwesi Appiah	(England) Cambridge United	10 July 2014	10 January 2015	
DF	(England) Jack Hunt	(England) Nottingham Forest	22 July 2014	31 December 2014	
FW	(Scotland) Stephen Dobbie	(England) Fleetwood Town	7 August 2014	30 June 2015	
FW	(England) Glenn Murray	(England) Reading	1 September 2014	January 2015	
MF	(Republic of Ireland) Owen Garvan	(England) Bolton Wanderers	10 September 2014	12 December 2014	
DF	(England) Jerome Binnom-Williams	(England) Southend United	11 September 2014	9 October 2014	
MF	(Wales) Jonathan Williams	(England) Ipswich Town	29 September 2014	31 December 2014	
DF	(Republic of Ireland) Paddy McCarthy	(England) Sheffield United	3 October 2014	November 2014	
DF	(England) Peter Ramage	(England) Barnsley	3 October 2014	30 June 2015	
DF	(England) Ryan Inniss	(England) Yeovil Town	16 October 2014	20 December 2014	
DF	(England) Michael Chambers	(England) Welling United	24 October 2014	21 November 2014	
DF	(Republic of Ireland) Paddy McCarthy	(England) Sheffield United	13 November 2014	28 December 2014	
GK	(Wales) Lewis Price	(England) Crawley Town	17 November 2014	20 December 2014	
MF	(Algeria) Adlène Guedioura	(England) Watford	26 November 2014	1 January 2015	
MF	(England) Stuart O'Keefe	(England) Blackpool	27 November 2014	1 January 2015	
MF	(England) Sullay Kaikai	(England) Cambridge United	27 November 2014	3 January 2015	
MF	(England) Jake Gray	(England) Cheltenham Town	16 January 2015	13 February 2015	
DF	(England) Zeki Fryers	(England) Rotherham United	16 January 2015	14 February 2015	
GK	(Wales) Lewis Price	(England) Crawley Town	16 January 2015	30 June 2015	
DF	(England) Jack Hunt	(England) Rotherham United	30 January 2015	2 May 2015	
MF	(Scotland) Barry Bannan	(England) Bolton Wanderers	2 February 2015	30 June 2015	
DF	(England) Ryan Inniss	(England) Port Vale	12 February 2015	14 March 2015	
MF	(Algeria) Adlène Guedioura	(England) Watford	27 February 2015	25 April 2015	
DF	(Republic of Ireland) Paddy McCarthy	(England) Bolton Wanderers	10 March 2015	30 June 2015	
MF	(Wales) Jonathan Williams	(England) Ipswich Town	26 March 2015	30 June 2015	
DF	(England) Zeki Fryers	(England) Ipswich Town	26 March 2015	30 June 2015	
FW	(England) Kwesi Appiah	(England) Reading	26 March 2015	30 June 2015	
