= 1992–93 Watford F.C. season =

English football team season

Watford
1992–93 season
- Chairman: Jack Petchey
- Manager: Steve Perryman
- Stadium: Vicarage Road
- First Division: 16th
- FA Cup: Third round
- League Cup: Fourth round
- Top goalscorer: Paul Furlong (19)
- Average home league attendance: 8,275
Home colours

During the 1992–93 English football season, Watford F.C. competed in the Football League First Division.

== Season summary ==
The Hornets had a satisfying start to the 1992–93 season and by the end of 1992 were in 14th place, 10 points clear of the relegation zone and 5 points adrift of the play-off places, but a bad run of 8 defeats in 12 league games saw their play-off chances slip away and stuck them in mid-table, finishing in a disappointing 16th place. At the end of the season, manager Steve Perryman left the club to return to Tottenham Hotspur as assistant manager to Osvaldo Ardiles and Watford appointed Gillingham boss Glenn Roeder as his replacement. However, Watford were fined £10,000 for an illegal approach, and ordered to pay Gillingham a further £30,000 in compensation.

== Final league table ==
Pos	Team	Pld	W	D	L	GF	GA	GD	Pts
14	Oxford United	46	14	14	18	53	56	−3	56
15	Bristol City	46	14	14	18	49	67	−18	56
16	Watford	46	14	13	19	57	71	−14	55
17	Notts County	46	12	16	18	55	70	−15	52
18	Southend United	46	13	13	20	54	64	−10	52

Source: rsssf.com
Rules for classification: 1) Points; 2) Goals scored; 3) Goal difference

== Results ==
Watford's score comes first

=== Legend ===
Win	Draw	Loss

=== Football League First Division ===
Date	Opponent	Venue	Result	Attendance	Scorers
15 August 1992	Millwall	H	3–1	9,745	Bazeley, Nogan, Drysdale (pen)
22 August 1992	Grimsby Town	A	2–3	4,772	Furlong, Dublin
25 August 1992	Notts County	A	2–1	6,274	Drysdale, Furlong
29 August 1992	Derby County	H	0–0	9,809	
5 September 1992	West Ham United	A	1–2	11,921	Furlong
12 September 1992	Notts County	H	1–3	7,077	Drysdale
19 September 1992	Wolverhampton Wanderers	A	2–2	13,497	Furlong, Nogan
26 September 1992	Leicester City	H	0–3	8,715	
29 September 1992	Sunderland	H	2–1	6,263	Hessenthaler (2)
3 October 1992	Swindon Town	A	1–3	7,723	Furlong
10 October 1992	Bristol Rovers	H	4–2	7,624	Nogan (2), Drysdale (pen), Furlong
17 October 1992	Brentford	A	1–1	8,490	Nogan
24 October 1992	Tranmere Rovers	H	3–2	6,937	Furlong (2), Charlery
31 October 1992	Oxford United	A	1–1	6,234	Furlong
3 November 1992	Peterborough United	H	1–2	7,016	Charlery
7 November 1992	Barnsley	A	1–0	6,193	Hessenthaler
14 November 1992	Portsmouth	H	0–0	8,714	
21 November 1992	Newcastle United	A	0–2	28,871	
29 November 1992	Luton Town	A	0–2	8,341	
5 December 1992	Bristol City	H	0–0	6,746	
13 December 1992	Charlton Athletic	H	1–1	6,541	Charlery
19 December 1992	Birmingham City	A	2–2	7,182	Furlong (2)
26 December 1992	Southend United	A	2–1	5,769	Charlery, Soloman
28 December 1992	Cambridge United	H	2–2	8,147	Willis, Charlery
9 January 1993	Wolverhampton Wanderers	H	3–1	6,845	Furlong (2), Nogan
16 January 1993	Leicester City	A	2–5	12,854	Nogan, Willis
27 January 1993	Sunderland	A	2–1	14,703	Furlong, Willis
30 January 1993	Grimsby Town	H	2–3	6,613	Nogan, Furlong
6 February 1993	Millwall	A	2–5	8,847	Furlong, Nogan
13 February 1993	West Ham United	H	1–2	13,115	Charlery
20 February 1993	Derby County	A	2–1	15,190	Furlong, Charlery
27 February 1993	Bristol Rovers	A	3–0	5,702	Charlery (2), Nogan
6 March 1993	Swindon Town	H	0–4	8,791	
9 March 1993	Portsmouth	A	0–1	10,716	
13 March 1993	Barnsley	H	1–2	5,785	Furlong
20 March 1993	Bristol City	A	1–2	8,265	Charlery
23 March 1993	Newcastle United	H	1–0	11,634	Furlong
27 March 1993	Peterborough United	A	0–0	7,631	
3 April 1993	Luton Town	H	0–0	10,656	
6 April 1993	Charlton Athletic	A	1–3	6,462	(own goal)
10 April 1993	Southend United	H	0–0	7,198	
13 April 1993	Cambridge United	A	1–1	5,106	Nogan
17 April 1993	Birmingham City	H	1–0	9,186	Charlery
24 April 1993	Brentford	H	1–0	9,045	Drysdale (pen)
1 May 1993	Tranmere Rovers	A	1–2	8,315	Drysdale (pen)
8 May 1993	Oxford United	H	0–1	8,127	

=== FA Cup ===
Round	Date	Opponent	Venue	Result	Attendance	Goalscorers
R3	2 January 1993	Wolverhampton Wanderers	H	1–4	12,363	Nogan

=== League Cup ===
Round	Date	Opponent	Venue	Result	Attendance	Goalscorers
R2 First Leg	22 September 1992	Reading	H	2–2	4,036	Furlong (2)
R2 Second Leg	7 October 1992	Reading	A	2–0 (won 4–2 on agg)	7,386	Drysdale, Lavin
R3	10 November 1992	Leeds United	H	2–1	18,035	Holdsworth, Drysdale (pen)
R4	9 December 1992	Blackburn Rovers	A	1–6	13,187	Furlong

=== Anglo-Italian Cup ===
Round	Date	Opponent	Venue	Result	Attendance	Goalscorers
PR Group 5	1 September 1992	Bristol City	A	0–1	3,588	
PR Group 5	15 September 1992	Luton Town	H	0–0	5,197	

== Players ==
=== First-team squad ===
Squad at end of season

Note: Flags indicate national team as defined under FIFA eligibility rules; some limited exceptions apply. Players may hold more than one non-FIFA nationality.

Pos.	Nation	Player
GK	ENG	Simon Sheppard
GK	ENG	Perry Suckling
GK	ENG	Keith Waugh
DF	ENG	Julian Alsford
DF	ENG	Barry Ashby
DF	ENG	Darren Bazeley
DF	ENG	Jason Drysdale
DF	ENG	Keith Dublin
DF	ENG	Nigel Gibbs
DF	ENG	David Holdsworth
DF	ENG	Jason Soloman
DF	WAL	Rob Page
DF	SCO	Gerard Lavin (Note: Lavin was born in Corby, England, but also qualified to represent Scotland internationally and represented them at U-21 level.)

Pos.	Nation	Player
MF	ENG	Andy Hessenthaler
MF	ENG	James Meara
MF	ENG	Gary Porter
MF	ENG	Trevor Putney
MF	ENG	Rod Thomas
MF	AUS	Richard Johnson
FW	ENG	Steve Butler
FW	ENG	Bruce Dyer (Note: Dyer was born in Redbridge, England, and represented England at U-21 level, but also qualified to represent Montserrat internationally and would make his international debut for Montserrat in September 2007.)
FW	ENG	Paul Furlong
FW	ENG	Alex Inglethorpe
FW	ENG	Roger Willis
FW	WAL	Lee Nogan
FW	LCA	Ken Charlery (Note: Charlery was born in Tower Hamlets, but also qualified to represent Saint Lucia internationally.)
