= 1993–94 Watford F.C. season =

English football team season

Watford
1993–94 season
- Chairman: Jack Petchey
- Manager: Glenn Roeder
- Stadium: Vicarage Road
- First Division: 19th
- FA Cup: Third round
- League Cup: Second round
- Top goalscorer: League: Paul Furlong (18); All: Paul Furlong (19)
- Average home league attendance: 7,907

During the 1993–94 English football season, Watford F.C. competed in the Football League First Division.

== Season summary ==
In July 1993, after Steve Perryman left to join Tottenham Hotspur, Roeder was hired as Watford's new manager at the start of the 1993–94 season. However, Watford were fined £10,000 for an illegal approach, and ordered to pay Gillingham a further £30,000 in compensation.

Watford endured a poor season and came nowhere near to mounting a serious promotion challenge which at one stage produced just 4 wins from 20 league games, picking up just 16 points out of 60 during that run which also included 7 defeats in 8 games. As a result of their poor form, they were involved in a relegation battle and at that stage just ahead of the relegation zone on goals scored, and their form didn't improve heading to the closing stages of the season and again lost 7 from 8 games between 5 February and 19 March which saw the Hornets in the relegation zone and looked set for the drop but their final 10 games saw Watford win six to secure survival for another season in Division One.

== Final league table ==
Pos	Team	Pld	W	D	L	GF	GA	GD	Pts
17	Portsmouth	46	15	13	18	52	58	−6	58
18	Barnsley	46	16	7	23	55	67	−12	55
19	Watford	46	15	9	22	66	80	−14	54
20	Luton Town	46	14	11	21	56	60	−4	53
21	West Bromwich Albion	46	13	12	21	60	69	−9	51

Source: rsssf.com
Rules for classification: 1) Points; 2) Goals scored; 3) Goal difference

== Results ==
Watford's score comes first

=== Legend ===
Win	Draw	Loss

=== Football League First Division ===
Date	Opponent	Venue	Result	Attendance	Scorers
14 August 1993	Luton Town	A	1–2	9,149	Furlong
21 August 1993	Barnsley	H	0–2	5,937	
28 August 1993	Oxford United	A	3–2	5,159	Charlery, Porter, Alsford
4 September 1993	Charlton Athletic	H	2–2	6,925	Porter, Inglethorpe
7 September 1993	Wolverhampton Wanderers	H	1–0	7,870	Venus (own goal)
11 September 1993	Grimsby Town	A	2–2	4,783	Nogan, Porter
18 September 1993	Notts County	H	3–1	6,959	Furlong (2), Lavin
25 September 1993	Sunderland	H	1–1	7,694	Ashby
2 October 1993	Millwall	A	1–4	7,707	Nogan
10 October 1993	Middlesbrough	H	2–0	7,582	Furlong, Dyer
16 October 1993	Birmingham City	A	0–1	12,823	
23 October 1993	Bolton Wanderers	H	4–3	7,492	Porter (3), Charlery
30 October 1993	West Bromwich Albion	A	1–4	15,299	Soloman
3 November 1993	Southend United	A	0–3	4,584	
6 November 1993	Stoke City	H	1–3	7,767	Dyer
20 November 1993	Bristol City	H	1–1	6,045	Soloman
28 November 1993	Crystal Palace	H	1–3	7,485	Nogan
4 December 1993	Stoke City	A	0–2	13,465	
7 December 1993	Portsmouth	A	0–2	8,242	
11 December 1993	Wolverhampton Wanderers	A	0–2	17,460	
19 December 1993	Luton Town	H	2–2	7,567	Dyer (2)
27 December 1993	Leicester City	A	4–4	21,744	Furlong (2), Dyer (2)
28 December 1993	Peterborough United	H	2–1	7,155	Furlong (2)
1 January 1994	Tranmere Rovers	A	1–2	8,271	Furlong
3 January 1994	Nottingham Forest	H	1–2	14,539	Cooper (own goal)
15 January 1994	Birmingham City	H	5–2	7,636	Hessenthaler, Furlong (3), Porter
22 January 1994	Middlesbrough	A	1–1	8,089	Furlong
29 January 1994	Derby County	A	2–1	15,308	Soloman, Furlong
5 February 1994	Bolton Wanderers	A	1–3	10,150	Inglethorpe
12 February 1994	West Bromwich Albion	H	0–1	10,087	
19 February 1994	Derby County	H	3–4	8,277	Ashby, Furlong, Bazeley
26 February 1994	Charlton Athletic	A	1–2	7,546	Porter
5 March 1994	Oxford United	H	2–1	7,049	Hessenthaler, Ford (own goal)
12 March 1994	Notts County	A	0–1	6,378	
15 March 1994	Grimsby Town	H	0–3	5,109	
19 March 1994	Sunderland	A	0–2	16,479	
26 March 1994	Millwall	H	2–0	9,036	Lavin, Hessenthaler
30 March 1994	Nottingham Forest	A	1–2	23,044	Porter
2 April 1994	Leicester City	H	1–1	8,645	Bailey
5 April 1994	Peterborough United	A	4–3	7,734	Furlong, Bailey, Dublin, Lavin
9 April 1994	Tranmere Rovers	H	1–2	7,347	Bailey
12 April 1994	Barnsley	A	1–0	4,380	Furlong
16 April 1994	Southend United	H	3–0	7,694	Bailey, Mooney, Foster
23 April 1994	Bristol City	A	1–1	8,324	Furlong
30 April 1994	Portsmouth	H	1–0	10,141	Hessenthaler
8 May 1994	Crystal Palace	A	2–0	28,749	Hessenthaler, Mooney

=== FA Cup ===
Round	Date	Opponent	Venue	Result	Attendance	Goalscorers
R3	8 January 1994	West Ham United	A	1–2	19,802	Porter (pen)

=== League Cup ===
Round	Date	Opponent	Venue	Result	Attendance	Goalscorers
R1 1st leg	17 August 1993	Brentford	A	2–2	4,297	Dyer, Furlong
R1 2nd leg	24 August 1993	Brentford	H	3–1 (won 5–3 on agg)	4,938	Holdsworth, Soloman, Dyer
R2 1st leg	21 September 1993	Millwall	H	0–0	5,954	
R2 2nd leg	6 October 1993	Millwall	H	3–4 (lost 3–4 on agg)	5,381	Hessenthaler, Porter, Nogan

=== Anglo-Italian Cup ===
Round	Date	Opponent	Venue	Result	Attendance	Goalscorers
Group 6	31 August 1993	Luton Town	H	2–1	2,854	Dyer, Inglethorpe
Group 6	15 September 1993	Southend United	A	0–3	1,881	

== Players ==
=== First-team squad ===
Squad at end of season

Note: Flags indicate national team as defined under FIFA eligibility rules; some limited exceptions apply. Players may hold more than one non-FIFA nationality.

No.	Pos.	Nation	Player
—	GK	(England) ENG	Perry Digweed
—	GK	(England) ENG	Simon Sheppard
—	GK	(England) ENG	Perry Suckling
—	DF	(England) ENG	Julian Alsford
—	DF	(England) ENG	David Barnes
—	DF	(England) ENG	Darren Bazeley
—	DF	(England) ENG	Jason Drysdale
—	DF	(England) ENG	Keith Dublin
—	DF	(England) ENG	Colin Foster
—	DF	(England) ENG	David Holdsworth
—	DF	(England) ENG	Keith Millen
—	DF	(England) ENG	Jason Soloman
—	DF	(Wales) WAL	Alan McCarthy (Note: McCarthy was born in Wandsworth, England, but also qualified to represent Wales internationally and represented them at U-21 level.)

No.	Pos.	Nation	Player
—	DF	(Wales) WAL	Rob Page
—	DF	(Scotland) SCO	Gerard Lavin (Note: Lavin was born in Corby, England, but also qualified to represent Scotland internationally and represented them at U-21 level.)
—	DF	(Canada) CAN	Mark Watson
—	MF	(England) ENG	Paul Harding (on loan from Notts County)
—	MF	(England) ENG	Andy Hessenthaler
—	MF	(England) ENG	Gary Porter
—	MF	(England) ENG	Craig Ramage
—	MF	(Australia) AUS	Richard Johnson
—	FW	(England) ENG	Dennis Bailey
—	FW	(England) ENG	Paul Furlong
—	FW	(England) ENG	Alex Inglethorpe
—	FW	(England) ENG	Tommy Mooney (on loan from Southend United)
—	FW	(Wales) WAL	Lee Nogan

=== Left club during season ===
Note: Flags indicate national team as defined under FIFA eligibility rules; some limited exceptions apply. Players may hold more than one non-FIFA nationality.

No.	Pos.	Nation	Player
—	DF	(England) ENG	Barry Ashby (to Brentford)
—	MF	(England) ENG	Roger Willis (to Birmingham City)

No.	Pos.	Nation	Player
—	FW	(England) ENG	Bruce Dyer (Note: Dyer was born in Redbridge, England, and represented them at U-21 level, but played a friendly game for Montserrat against Ashford Town in September 2007.) (to Crystal Palace)
—	FW	(Saint Lucia) LCA	Ken Charlery (Note: Charlery was born in Tower Hamlets, but also qualified to represent Saint Lucia internationally.) (to Peterborough United)
