= 1991–92 Watford F.C. season =

English football team season

Watford
1991–92 season
- Chairman: Jack Petchey
- Manager: Steve Perryman
- Stadium: Vicarage Road
- Second Division: 10th
- FA Cup: Third round
- League Cup: Second round
- Full Members Cup: First round
- Top goalscorer: League: Blissett (9); All: Blissett (12)
- Average home league attendance: 8,511

During the 1991–92 English football season, Watford F.C. competed in the Football League Second Division.

== Season summary ==
In the 1991–92 season, Watford had a poor first half of the campaign and by Christmas were only above the relegation places on goal difference with their home form dragging them down the league with 7 defeats from the first 12 league matches at home. By the middle of March, the Hornets were still near the relegation zone and at that point one of the big contenders by many to go down but an amazing run of one defeat from their final 13 league games which included 8 wins, secured safety and finished in a satisfying 10th place.

== Final league table ==
Pos	Team	Pld	W	D	L	GF	GA	GD	Pts	Qualification or relegation
8	Swindon Town	46	18	15	13	69	55	+14	69	Qualification for the First Division (Note: From the 1992–93 season, the first tier became the Premier League, the second tier - then known as the Second Division - was renamed to the First Division, and the third tier - then known as the Third Division - was renamed to the Second Division.)
9	Portsmouth	46	19	12	15	65	51	+14	69	Qualification for the First Division
10	Watford	46	18	11	17	51	48	+3	65	Qualification for the First Division
11	Wolverhampton Wanderers	46	18	10	18	61	54	+7	64	Qualification for the First Division
12	Southend United	46	17	11	18	63	63	0	62	Qualification for the First Division

Rules for classification: 1) Points; 2) Goal difference; 3) Goals scored

== Results ==
Watford's score comes first

=== Legend ===
Win	Draw	Loss

=== Football League Second Division ===
Date	Opponent	Venue	Result	Attendance	Scorers
17 August 1991	Wolverhampton Wanderers	H	0–2	13,547	
24 August 1991	Newcastle United	A	2–2	22,440	Nicholas, Blissett
31 August 1991	Cambridge United	H	1–3	8,902	Blissett
3 September 1991	Barnsley	A	3–0	6,500	Bazeley, Blissett, Kennedy
7 September 1991	Middlesbrough	H	1–2	8,715	McLaughlin
14 September 1991	Brighton & Hove Albion	A	1–0	8,741	Butler
17 September 1991	Blackburn Rovers	A	0–1	9,542	
21 September 1991	Charlton Athletic	H	2–0	8,459	Butler, Hessenthaler
28 September 1991	Swindon Town	A	1–3	8,863	Porter
5 October 1991	Grimsby Town	H	2–0	6,970	Hessenthaler, Putney
12 October 1991	Bristol City	A	0–1	7,882	
19 October 1991	Southend United	H	1–2	6,862	Porter (pen)
26 October 1991	Plymouth Argyle	A	1–0	4,090	Bazeley
29 October 1991	Millwall	H	0–2	7,366	
2 November 1991	Sunderland	A	1–3	12,790	Porter
6 November 1991	Oxford United	H	2–0	4,785	Bazeley, Porter (pen)
9 November 1991	Leicester City	H	0–1	9,271	
16 November 1991	Bristol Rovers	A	1–1	5,064	Blissett
23 November 1991	Portsmouth	H	2–1	8,135	Blissett (2)
30 November 1991	Port Vale	A	1–2	5,777	Porter
7 December 1991	Derby County	H	1–1	8,302	Blissett
22 December 1991	Barnsley	H	1–1	7,522	Nogan
26 December 1991	Millwall	A	4–0	9,237	Porter, Butler (2), Drysdale
29 December 1991	Cambridge United	A	1–0	8,439	Butler
1 January 1992	Tranmere Rovers	H	0–0	9,892	
11 January 1992	Newcastle United	H	2–2	9,811	Holdsworth, Porter (pen)
18 January 1992	Wolverhampton Wanderers	A	0–3	14,175	
24 January 1992	Tranmere Rovers	A	1–1	6,187	Butler
1 February 1992	Southend United	A	0–1	7,581	
8 February 1992	Plymouth Argyle	H	1–0	7,260	Blissett
22 February 1992	Port Vale	H	0–0	6,602	
29 February 1992	Derby County	A	1–3	14,052	Nogan
7 March 1992	Ipswich Town	H	0–1	9,199	
11 March 1992	Oxford United	A	0–0	5,808	
14 March 1992	Sunderland	H	1–0	8,091	Porter (pen)
17 March 1992	Ipswich Town	A	2–1	12,484	Drysdale (2)
21 March 1992	Leicester City	A	2–1	14,519	Butler, Nogan
28 March 1992	Bristol Rovers	H	1–0	7,496	Drysdale (pen)
31 March 1992	Brighton & Hove Albion	H	0–1	7,589	
4 April 1992	Middlesbrough	A	2–1	13,669	Butler, Holdsworth
11 April 1992	Blackburn Rovers	H	2–1	10,522	Bazeley (2)
18 April 1992	Charlton Athletic	A	1–1	7,477	Nogan
20 April 1992	Swindon Town	H	0–0	9,911	
22 April 1992	Portsmouth	A	0–0	14,417	
25 April 1992	Grimsby Town	A	1–0	6,483	Nogan
2 May 1992	Bristol City	H	5–2	10,582	Blissett, Putney, Bazeley, Gibbs, Drysdale

=== FA Cup ===
Round	Date	Opponent	Venue	Result	Attendance	Goalscorers
R3	4 January 1992	Swindon Town	A	2–3	9,817	Blissett (2)

=== League Cup ===
Round	Date	Opponent	Venue	Result	Attendance	Goalscorers
R1 1st Leg	20 August 1991	Southend United	H	2–0	6,231	Porter, Blissett
R1 2nd Leg	28 August 1991	Southend United	A	1–1 (won 3–1 on agg)	3,802	Kennedy
R2 1st Leg	24 September 1991	Everton	A	0–1	8,284	
R2 2nd Leg	8 October 1991	Everton	H	1–2 (lost 1–3 on agg)	11,561	Bazeley

=== Full Members Cup ===
Round	Date	Opponent	Venue	Result	Attendance	Goalscorers
SR1	2 October 1991	Southend United	H	0–1	1,700	

== Squad ==
Note: Flags indicate national team as defined under FIFA eligibility rules; some limited exceptions apply. Players may hold more than one non-FIFA nationality.

Pos.	Nation	Player
GK	ENG	David James
GK	ENG	Keith Waugh
DF	ENG	Keith Dublin
DF	ENG	Nigel Gibbs
DF	ENG	Jason Drysdale
DF	ENG	David Holdsworth
DF	ENG	Darren Bazeley
DF	SCO	Joe McLaughlin
DF	ENG	Jason Soloman
DF	ENG	Barry Ashby
DF	NIR	Steve Morrow (on loan from Arsenal)
DF	ENG	Gerard Lavin

Pos.	Nation	Player
MF	ENG	Andy Hessenthaler
MF	ENG	Gary Porter
MF	ENG	Trevor Putney
MF	WAL	Peter Nicholas
MF	ENG	Rod Thomas
MF	AUS	Richard Johnson
MF	ENG	Alan Devonshire
FW	ENG	Luther Blissett
FW	ENG	Steve Butler
FW	WAL	Lee Nogan
FW	SCO	Andy Kennedy
FW	ENG	Alex Inglethorpe
