= 1997–98 Southend United F.C. season =

Southend United
1997–98 season
- Football League Second Division: 24th
- FA Cup: Second round
- League Cup: Second round
- Football League Trophy: First round

The 1997–98 season saw Southend United compete in the Football League Second Division where they finished in 24th position with 43 points, suffering relegation to the Third Division.

== Final league table ==
Pos	Team	Pld	W	D	L	GF	GA	GD	Pts	Promotion or relegation
20	Burnley	46	13	13	20	55	65	−10	52	
21	Brentford (R)	46	11	17	18	50	71	−21	50	Relegation to the Third Division
22	Plymouth Argyle (R)	46	12	13	21	55	70	−15	49	Relegation to the Third Division
23	Carlisle United (R)	46	12	8	26	57	73	−16	44	Relegation to the Third Division
24	Southend United (R)	46	11	10	25	47	79	−32	43	Relegation to the Third Division

Rules for classification: In the Football League goals scored (GF) takes precedence over goal difference (GD).
(R) Relegated

== Results ==
Southend United's score comes first

=== Legend ===
Win	Draw	Loss

=== Football League Second Division ===
Match	Date	Opponent	Venue	Result	Attendance	Scorers
1	9 August 1997	Carlisle United	H	1–1	4,507	Boere
2	18 August 1997	Luton Town	A	0–1	5,140	
3	23 August 1997	Burnley	H	1–0	4,218	Boere
4	30 August 1997	Walsall	A	1–3	3,304	Williams
5	2 September 1997	Wycombe Wanderers	A	1–4	4,528	Boere
6	5 September 1997	Brentford	H	3–1	3,458	Marsh, Boere, Clarke
7	13 September 1997	Millwall	A	1–3	8,606	Boere
8	20 September 1997	Fulham	H	1–0	5,026	Lewis
9	27 September 1997	Blackpool	A	0–3	4,542	
10	4 October 1997	Northampton Town	H	0–0	4,300	
11	11 October 1997	Bristol City	H	0–2	3,273	
12	18 October 1997	Plymouth Argyle	A	3–2	3,430	Wotton (o.g.), Clarke, N'Diaye
13	21 October 1997	Wrexham	A	1–3	2,039	Rammell
14	25 October 1997	Oldham Athletic	H	1–1	3,595	Coulbault
15	1 November 1997	Grimsby Town	A	1–5	4,501	Coulbault
16	4 November 1997	Watford	H	0–3	4,001	
17	8 November 1997	Wigan Athletic	H	1–0	2,716	Boere
18	18 November 1997	Bournemouth	A	1–2	3,019	Dublin
19	22 November 1997	Bristol Rovers	H	1–1	3,653	N'Diaye
20	29 November 1997	Chesterfield	A	0–1	4,101	
21	2 December 1997	Preston North End	H	3–2	2,307	Boere, Gridelet (2)
22	13 December 1997	Gillingham	A	2–1	4,774	Boere, Coulbault
23	19 December 1997	York City	H	4–4	3,215	Clarke (2), Dublin (2)
24	26 December 1997	Brentford	A	1–1	5,341	Coulbault
25	28 December 1997	Wycombe Wanderers	H	1–2	5,162	Thomson
26	3 January 1998	Luton Town	H	1–2	5,056	Thomson
27	10 January 1998	Carlisle United	A	0–5	5,389	
28	17 January 1998	Walsall	H	0–1	3,310	
29	24 January 1998	Burnley	A	0–1	9,386	
30	31 January 1998	Millwall	H	0–0	5,705	
31	7 February 1998	Fulham	A	0–2	9,122	
32	14 February 1998	Northampton Town	A	1–3	6,147	Boere
33	21 February 1998	Blackpool	H	2–1	3,340	Boere, Dublin
34	24 February 1998	Plymouth Argyle	H	3–0	4,363	Aldridge, Maher, Jobson
35	28 February 1998	Bristol City	A	0–1	12,049	
36	7 March 1998	Grimsby Town	H	0–1	4,829	
37	14 March 1998	Watford	A	1–1	10,750	Thomson
38	17 March 1998	Wigan Athletic	A	3–1	2,616	Thomson, Rammell, Whyte
39	21 March 1998	Bournemouth	H	5–3	4,823	Thomson (2), Boere (2), Clarke
40	27 March 1998	Bristol Rovers	A	0–2	5,323	
41	3 April 1998	Chesterfield	H	0–2	5,425	
42	11 April 1998	Preston North End	A	0–1	8,096	
43	13 April 1998	Gillingham	H	0–0	6,151	
44	18 April 1998	York City	A	1–1	2,850	Boere
45	25 April 1998	Oldham Athletic	A	0–2	4,485	
46	2 May 1998	Wrexham	H	1–3	4,220	Boere

=== FA Cup ===
Round	Date	Opponent	Venue	Result	Attendance	Scorers
R1	15 November 1997	Woking	A	2–0	5,000	Jones, Gridelet
R2	6 December 1997	Fulham	A	0–1	8,537	

=== League Cup ===
Round	Date	Opponent	Venue	Result	Attendance	Scorers
R1 1st Leg	12 August 1997	Cardiff City	A	1–1	2,804	Byrne
R1 2nd Leg	26 August 1997	Cardiff City	H	3–1	3,002	Williams (2), Marsh
R2 1st Leg	16 September 1997	Derby County	H	0–1	4,011	
R2 2nd Leg	1 October 1997	Derby County	A	0–5	18,490	

=== Football League Trophy ===
Round	Date	Opponent	Venue	Result	Attendance	Scorers
R1	9 December 1997	Wycombe Wanderers	H	0–1	1,577	

== Squad statistics ==
Pos.	Name	League		FA Cup		League Cup		Other		Total	
Pos.	Name	Apps	Goals	Apps	Goals	Apps	Goals	Apps	Goals	Apps	Goals
GK	(England) Simon Royce	37	0	2	0	4	0	1	0	44	0
GK	(Wales) Neville Southall	9	0	0	0	0	0	0	0	9	0
DF	(England) Mark Beard	6(2)	0	0	0	0	0	1	0	7(2)	0
DF	(England) Simon Coleman	14	0	0	0	0	0	0	0	14	0
DF	(England) Keith Dublin	14	4	0	0	0	0	0	0	14	4
DF	(England) Richard Jobson	8	1	0	0	0	0	0	0	8	1
DF	(Wales) Nathan Jones	33(5)	0	2	1	4	0	1	0	40(5)	1
DF	(England) Ben Lewis	14	1	1(1)	0	1(1)	0	1	0	17(2)	1
DF	(England) Chris Perkins	3(2)	0	0	0	0	0	1	0	4(2)	0
DF	(England) Leo Roget	11	0	0	0	3	0	0	0	14	0
DF	(England) Mark Stimson	17(3)	0	0	0	0	0	1	0	18(3)	0
MF	(England) Martin Allen	5	0	0	0	1	0	0	0	6	0
MF	(England) Carl Beeston	5(1)	0	0	0	3	0	0	0	8(1)	0
MF	(Republic of Ireland) Paul Byrne	9(1)	0	0	0	3	1	0	0	12(1)	1
MF	(England) Adrian Clarke	42(3)	5	2	0	4	0	1	0	49(3)	5
MF	(France) Regis Coulbault	30(4)	4	2	0	0	0	1	0	33(4)	4
MF	(England) Phil Gridelet	31(6)	2	2	1	2	0	0	0	35(6)	3
MF	(England) Julian Hails	41(3)	0	2	0	2(1)	0	0	0	45(3)	3
MF	(South Africa) Andy Harris	26(1)	0	2	0	3	0	0	0	31(1)	0
MF	(England) Mark Jones	1	0	0	0	0	0	0	0	1	0
MF	(Republic of Ireland) Kevin Maher	18	1	0	0	0	0	0	0	18	1
MF	(England) Mike Marsh	9	1	0	0	4	1	0	0	13	2
MF	(Denmark) John Nielsen	1(4)	0	0	0	0	0	0	0	1(4)	0
MF	(England) George Parris	1	0	0	0	0	0	0	0	1	0
FW	(England) Martin Aldridge	7(4)	1	0	0	0	0	0	0	7(4)	1
FW	(England) Jeroen Boere	28(3)	14	1(1)	0	3	0	1	0	32(4)	14
FW	(England) Trevor Fitzpatrick	1(2)	0	0	0	0	0	0	0	1(2)	0
FW	(Senegal) Pepe N'Diaye	15(2)	2	1	0	0	0	1	0	17(2)	2
FW	(Gabon) Guy Roger Nzamba	0(1)	0	0	0	0	0	0	0	0(1)	0
FW	(England) Andy Rammell	18(8)	2	1(1)	0	1(3)	0	1	0	20(12)	2
FW	(Scotland) Andy Thomson	16(16)	6	2	0	2	0	1	0	21(16)	6
FW	(England) David Whyte	3(5)	1	0	0	0	0	0	0	3(5)	1
FW	(England) Paul Williams	6	1	0	0	1(1)	2	0	0	7(1)	3
