= 1992–93 Football League Cup =

League Cup, The Coca-Cola Cup

Tournament details
- Country: England; Wales
- Dates: 18 August 1992 – 18 April 1993
- Teams: 92

Final positions
- Champions: Arsenal (2nd title)
- Runners-up: Sheffield Wednesday

Tournament statistics
- Matches played: 161
- Goals scored: 460 (2.86 per match)
- Top goal scorer(s): Mark Bright; Chris Kiwomya; Alan Shearer (6 goals each)

The 1992–93 Football League Cup (known as The Coca-Cola Cup for sponsorship reasons) was the 33rd edition of the Football League Cup, a knockout competition for English football's top four tiers.

This season's competition ran alongside the first season of the newly formed Premier League. The tournament was won by Arsenal, beating top level rivals Sheffield Wednesday 2–1 in the final at Wembley. This fixture would be repeated in the final of this seasons FA Cup also, which Arsenal would also win, albeit after a replay.

Ipswich Town forward Chris Kiwomya would finish as the tournament's joint-top goal scorer, along with Sheffield Wednesday striker Mark Bright, and Alan Shearer of Blackburn Rovers who all scored six.

Although winning the League Cup gave the victors a pathway into the UEFA Cup, as Arsenal also won the FA Cup, they qualified for the more prestigious European Cup Winners' Cup, a tournament they would also win. Their spot in the UEFA Cup would be taken by Norwich City, who finished third in the league.

This years competition began with only 92 teams entering (as opposed to the more customary 93). This was reduced as Maidstone United resigned on 17 August 1992, just two days before they were scheduled to play their first match.

== First round ==
Teams per tier in the competition at this stage
Premier League	Division One	Division Two	Division Three	Total
0 / 22	11 / 24	24 / 24	23 / 23	58 / 90

22 Premier League teams, plus 13 Division One teams ranked by position in the 1991–92 season entered at the Second Round

=== First leg ===
KO	Home	Score	Away	Stadium	Att
	Reading (3)	bye (Note: Maidstone United resigned from the Football League after the draw had been made. Reading subsequently received a bye to the second round.)	Maidstone United (4)	Elm Park	
Tuesday 18 August 1992
19:30	Bolton Wanderers (3)	2–1	Port Vale (3)	Burnden Park	3,282
19:30	Cardiff City (4)	1–0	Bristol City (2)	Ninian Park	7,708
19:30	Carlisle United (4)	4–1	Burnley (3)	Brunton Park	4,066
19:30	Chesterfield (4)	2–0	York City (4)	Recreation Ground	2,080
19:30	Crewe Alexandra (4)	4–1	Rochdale (4)	Gresty Road	2,558
19:30	Darlington (4)	1–1	Scunthorpe United (4)	Feethams	1,489
19:30	Doncaster Rovers (4)	0–3	Lincoln City (4)	Belle Vue	2,507
19:30	Exeter City (3)	0–0	Birmingham City (2)	St James Park	3,030
19:30	Fulham (3)	0–2	Brentford (2)	Craven Cottage	5,067
19:30	Halifax Town (4)	1–2	Hartlepool United (3)	The Shay	1,370
19:30	Hereford United (4)	2–2	Torquay United (4)	Edgar Street	1,201
19:30	Hull City (3)	2–2	Rotherham United (3)	Boothferry Park	3,226
19:30	Peterborough United (2)	4–0	Barnet (4)	London Road Stadium	2,770
19:30	Preston North End (3)	2–1	Stoke City (3)	Deepdale	5,581

KO	Home	Score	Away	Stadium	Att
Tuesday 18 August 1992 cont'd
19:30	Shrewsbury Town (4)	1–2	Wigan Athletic (3)	Gay Meadow	1,337
19:30	Stockport County (3)	1–1	Chester City (3)	Edgeley Park	2,785
19:30	Wrexham (4)	1–1	Bury (4)	Racecourse Ground	2,847
19:45	Colchester United (4)	1–1	Brighton & Hove Albion (3)	Burnden Park	3,817
19:45	Gillingham (4)	2–1	Northampton Town (4)	Priestfield Stadium	2,245
19:45	Leyton Orient (3)	2–2	Millwall (2)	Brisbane Road	4,939
19:45	Oxford United (2)	3–0	Swansea City (3)	Manor Ground	3,582
19:45	Sunderland (2)	2–3	Huddersfield Town (3)	Roker Park	10,726
Wednesday 19 August 1992
19:30	Scarborough (4)	3–0	Bradford City (3)	Athletic Ground	2,089
19:30	Tranmere Rovers (2)	3–0	Blackpool (3)	Prenton Park	3,719
19:30	West Bromwich Albion (3)	1–0	Plymouth Argyle (3)	The Hawthorns	8,264
19:45	Grimsby Town (2)	1–1	Barnsley (2)	Blundell Park	3,927
19:45	Newcastle United (2)	2–1	Mansfield Town (3)	St. James' Park	14,083
19:45	Walsall (4)	1–1	Bournemouth (3)	Bescot Stadium	3,001

=== Second leg ===
KO	Home	Score (agg)	Away	Stadium	Att
	Maidstone United (4)	bye	Reading (3)	Watling Street	
Tuesday 25 August 1992
19:30	Blackpool (3)	4–0 (4–3)	Tranmere Rovers (2)	Bloomfield Road	2,734
19:30	Burnley (3)	1–1 (2–5)	Carlisle United (4)	Turf Moor	5,524
19:30	Bury (4)	4–3 (5–4)	Wrexham (3)	Brunton Park	2,193
19:30	Chester City (3)	1–2 (2–3)	Stockport County (3)	Deva Stadium	4,505
19:30	Hartlepool United (3)	3–2 (5–3)	Halifax Town (4)	Victoria Park	2,191
19:30	Lincoln City (4)	1–1 (4–1)	Doncaster Rovers (4)	Sincil Bank	1,996
19:30	Mansfield Town (3)	0–0 (1–2)	Newcastle United (2)	Field Mill	6,725
19:30	Rochdale (4)	1–2 (2–6)	Crewe Alexandra (4)	Spotland Stadium	1,302
19:30	Rotherham United (3)	1–0 (3–2)	Hull City (3)	Millmoor	3,565
19:30	Scunthorpe United (4)	2–0 (3–1)	Darlington (4)	Glanford Park	2,299
19:30	Swansea City (3)	1–0 (1–3)	Oxford United (2)	Vetch Field	2,256
19:30	Torquay United (4)	5–0 (7–2)	Hereford United (4)	Plainmoor	2,140
19:30	Wigan Athletic (3)	0–1 (aet) (2–2)	Shrewsbury Town (4)	Springfield Park	1,380
19:30	York City (4)	0–0 (0–2)	Chesterfield (4)	Bootham Crescent	2,336
19:45	Barnet (4)	2–2 (2–6)	Peterborough United (2)	Underhill Stadium	1,789

KO	Home	Score (agg)	Away	Stadium	Att
Tuesday 25 August 1992 cont'd
19:45	Barnsley (2)	1–1 (aet) (2–2)	Grimsby Town (2)	Oakwell	4,636
19:45	Bournemouth (3)	0–1 (1–2)	Walsall (4)	Dean Court	3,567
19:45	Brentford (2)	2–0 (4–0)	Fulham (3)	Griffin Park	4,806
19:45	Bristol City (2)	5–1 (5–2)	Cardiff City (4)	Ashton Gate	9,801
19:45	Plymouth Argyle (3)	2–0 (2–1)	West Bromwich Albion (3)	Home Park	7,866
19:45	Port Vale (3)	1–1 (2–3)	Bolton Wanderers (3)	Vale Park	4,870
20:00	Birmingham City (2)	1–4 (1–4)	Exeter City (3)	St Andrew's	5,715
Wednesday 26 August 1992
19:30	Bradford City (3)	3–5 (3–8)	Scarborough (4)	Valley Parade	2,894
19:30	Huddersfield Town (3)	0–1 (aet) (3–3)	Sunderland (2)	Leeds Road	6,737
19:30	Stoke City (3)	4–0 (5–2)	Preston North End (3)	Victoria Ground	9,745
19:45	Brighton & Hove Albion (3)	1–0 (2–1)	Colchester United (4)	Goldstone Ground	4,125
19:45	Millwall (2)	3–0 (5–2)	Leyton Orient (3)	The Den	5,444
Wednesday 9 September 1992
19:30	Northampton Town (4)	0–2 (1–4)	Gillingham (4)	Sixfields Stadium	2,390

== Second round ==
Teams per tier in the competition at this stage
Premier League	Division One	Division Two	Division Three	Total
22 / 22	20 / 24	12 / 24	10 / 22	64 / 90

=== First leg ===
21 September 1992	Tottenham Hotspur (1)	3–1	Brentford (2)	Tottenham
19:45 BST	Sheringham 40'; Watson 61'; Durie 73'		Blissett 55'	Stadium: White Hart Lane; Attendance: 19,365; Referee: John Martin

22 September 1992	Bolton Wanderers (3)	1–3	Wimbledon (1)	Bolton
19:30 BST	Stubbs 46'		Fashanu 26'; Ardley 33'; Jones 74'	Stadium: Burnden Park; Attendance: 5,049; Referee: Jim Rushton

22 September 1992	Bury (4)	0–0	Charlton Athletic (2)	Bury
19:30 BST				Stadium: Gigg Lane; Attendance: 2,339

22 September 1992	Carlisle United (4)	2–2	Norwich City (1)	Carlisle
19:30 BST	Barnsley 25' (pen.); Edmondson 62'		Robins 46'; Goss 57'	Stadium: Brunton Park; Attendance: 10,328; Referee: Andrew Hendrick

22 September 1992	Exeter City (3)	0–1	Oldham Athletic (1)	Exeter
19:30 BST			Henry 85'	Stadium: St James Park; Attendance: 4,375

22 September 1992	Liverpool (1)	4–4	Chesterfield (4)	Liverpool
19:30 BST	Rosenthal 51'; Hutchison 58'; Walters 72'; Wright 85'		Norris 7', 69'; Lancaster 30', 48'	Stadium: Anfield; Attendance: 12,533; Referee: Peter Wright

22 September 1992	Wigan Athletic (3)	2–2	Ipswich Town (1)	Wigan
19:30 BST	Johnson 47'; Worthington 89'		Johnson 1'; Robertson 72' (o.g.)	Stadium: Springfield Park; Attendance: 2,684; Referee: Mike Peck

22 September 1992	Arsenal (1)	1–1	Millwall (2)	Highbury
19:45 BST	Campbell 78'		Roberts 52'	Stadium: Arsenal Stadium; Attendance: 20,940; Referee: Jim Borrett

22 September 1992	Bristol City (2)	2–1	Sheffield United (1)	Bristol
19:45 BST	Edwards 19'; Scott 41' (pen)		Rogers 37'	Stadium: Ashton Gate; Attendance: 6,922; Referee: Graham Poll

22 September 1992	Cambridge United (2)	2–2	Stoke City (3)	Cambridge
19:45 BST	Philpott 37'; Chapple 89'		Stein 34', 64'	Stadium: Abbey Stadium; Attendance: 3,426; Referee: Paul Alcock

22 September 1992	Leeds United (1)	4–1	Scunthorpe United (4)	Leeds
19:45 BST	Strachan 23'; Chapman 35'; Speed 46'; Shutt 82'		Helliwell 64'	Stadium: Elland Road; Attendance: 10,113; Referee: John Watson

22 September 1992	Notts County (2)	3–2	Wolverhampton Wanderers (2)	Nottingham
19:45 BST	Lund 20', 42'; Robinson 29'		Bull 11'; Cook 89' (pen.)	Stadium: Meadow Lane; Attendance: 4,197; Referee: Bob Hamer

22 September 1992	Watford (2)	2–2	Reading (3)	Watford
19:45 BST	Furlong 18', 48'		Quinn 22'; Williams 87'	Stadium: Vicarage Road; Attendance: 4,036; Referee: Keren Barratt

22 September 1992	Crystal Palace (1)	3–1	Lincoln City (4)	Selhurst
20:00 BST	Southgate 19'; Salako 61'; McGoldrick 84'		Bressington 87'	Stadium: Selhurst Park; Attendance: 6,947; Referee: Paul Danson

23 September 1992	Blackpool (3)	0–4	Portsmouth (2)	Blackpool
19:30 BST			Clarke 48'; McLoughlin 55', 77'; Murray 70'	Stadium: Bloomfield Road; Attendance: 4,422

23 September 1992	Huddersfield Town (3)	1–1	Blackburn Rovers (1)	Huddersfield
19:30 BST	Onuora 61'		Shearer 85'	Stadium: Leeds Road; Attendance: 11,071; Referee: Bill Burns

23 September 1992	Rotherham United (3)	1–0	Everton (1)	Rotherham
19:30 BST	Goater 18'			Stadium: Millmoor; Attendance: 7,736; Referee: Ken Lupton

23 September 1992	Stockport County (3)	2–3	Nottingham Forest (1)	Stockport
19:30 BST	Francis 23' 64'		Bannister 24'; Clough 54'; Örlygsson 59'	Stadium: Edgeley Park; Attendance: 7,964; Referee: John Key

23 September 1992	Torquay United (4)	0–6	Swindon Town (2)	Torquay
19:30 BST			Maskell 8'; Mitchell 34', 81'; Ling 35'; Taylor 55'; White 85'	Stadium: Plainmoor; Attendance: 3,560; Referee: Paul Vanes

23 September 1992	Brighton & Hove Albion (3)	1–1	Manchester United (1)	Brighton and Hove
19:45 BST	Edwards 72'		Wallace 36'	Stadium: Goldstone Ground; Attendance: 16,649; Referee: Ian Hemley

23 September 1992	Coventry City (1)	2–0	Scarborough (4)	Coventry
19:45 BST	Borrows 70' (pen.); Ndlovu 74'			Stadium: Highfield Road; Attendance: 5,993; Referee: Arthur Smith

23 September 1992	Gillingham (4)	0–0	Southampton (1)	Gillingham
19:45 BST				Stadium: Priestfield Stadium; Attendance: 7,488; Referee: Dermot Gallagher

23 September 1992	Leicester City (2)	2–0	Peterborough United (2)	Leicester
19:45 BST	Lowe 72'; Thompson 82'			Stadium: Filbert Street; Attendance: 10,366; Referee: Howard King

23 September 1992	Luton Town (2)	2–2	Plymouth Argyle (3)	Luton
19:45 BST	Claridge 9', 82'		Regis 49', 75'	Stadium: Kenilworth Road; Attendance: 3,702; Referee: Allan Gunn

23 September 1992	Manchester City (1)	0–0	Bristol Rovers (2)	Manchester
19:45 BST				Stadium: Maine Road; Attendance: 9,967; Referee: Colin Trussell

23 September 1992	Newcastle United (2)	0–0	Middlesbrough (1)	Newcastle upon Tyne
19:45 BST				Stadium: St. James' Park; Attendance: 25,814; Referee: David Allison

23 September 1992	Oxford United (2)	1–2	Aston Villa (1)	Oxford
19:45 BST	Beauchamp 89'		McGrath 52'; Teale 72'	Stadium: Manor Ground; Attendance: 8,837; Referee: Roger Wiseman

23 September 1992	Queens Park Rangers (1)	2–1	Grimsby Town (2)	Shepherd's Bush
19:45 BST	Ferdinand 45', 69' 69'		Watson 51'	Stadium: Loftus Road; Attendance: 7,274; Referee: Graham Pooley

23 September 1992	Sheffield Wednesday (1)	3–0	Hartlepool United (3)	Hillsborough Stadium
19:45 BST	Watson 61'; Bright 66'; Wilson 89'			Stadium: Loftus Road; Attendance: 10,112; Referee: Jarnail Singh

23 September 1992	Southend United (2)	1–0	Derby County (2)	Southend-on-Sea
19:45 BST	Benjamin 82'			Stadium: Roots Hall; Attendance: 2,492; Referee: John Key

23 September 1992	Walsall (4)	0–3	Chelsea (1)	Walsall
19:45 BST			Wise 15'; Newton 28'; Townsend 78'	Stadium: Bescot Stadium; Attendance: 5,510; Referee: Clive Wilkes

23 September 1992	West Ham United (2)	0–0	Crewe Alexandra (4)	Upton Park
19:45 BST				Stadium: Boleyn Ground; Attendance: 6,981; Referee: Mike Bailey

=== Second leg ===
6 October 1992	Chesterfield (4)	1–4 (5–8 agg.)	Liverpool (1)	Chesterfield
19:30 BST	Hebberd 8'		Hutchison 19'; Redknapp 35'; Walters 42'; Rush 55'	Stadium: Recreation Ground; Attendance: 10,632; Referee: Gerald Ashby

6 October 1992	Hartlepool United (3)	2–2 (2–5 agg.)	Sheffield Wednesday (1)	Hartlepool
19:30 BST	Saville 61' (pen.); Johnrose 90'		Bright 1'; Warhurst 59'	Stadium: Victoria Park; Attendance: 4,667; Referee: Paul Harrison

6 October 1992	Peterborough United (2)	2–1 (2–3 agg.)	Leicester City (2)	Peterborough
19:30 BST	Halsall 16'; Charlery 44'		Joachim 43'	Stadium: London Road; Attendance: 6,936; Referee: Peter Foakes

6 October 1992	Blackburn Rovers (1)	4–3 (a.e.t.) (5–4 agg.)	Huddersfield Town (3)	Blackburn
19:45 BST	Shearer 9', 83'; Wegerle 53'; Newell 107'		Barnett 65'; Roberts 76'; Ireland 77'	Stadium: Ewood Park; Attendance: 15,038; Referee: Ken Redfern

6 October 1992	Grimsby Town (2)	2–1 (a.e.t.) (3–3 agg.) (5–6 p)	Queens Park Rangers (1)	Cleethorpes
19:45 BST	Sinton 56' (o.g.); Woods 81'		Bailey 68'	Stadium: Blundell Park; Attendance: 8,443; Referee: Jim Parker

6 October 1992	Ipswich Town (1)	4–0 (6–2 agg.)	Wigan Athletic (3)	Ipswich
19:45 BST	Johnson 28'; Kiwomya 25', 71', 86'			Stadium: Portman Road; Attendance: 7,305; Referee: Tony Ward

6 October 1992	Lincoln City (4)	1–1 (2–4 agg.)	Crystal Palace (1)	Lincoln
19:45 BST	Puttnam 28'		Southgate 20'	Stadium: Sincil Bank; Attendance: 6,255; Referee: Roger Dilkes

6 October 1992	Plymouth Argyle (3)	3–2 (5–4 agg.)	Luton Town (2)	Plymouth
19:45 BST	Nugent 4'; Regis 51'; Poole 54'		Claridge 61'; Preece 69'	Stadium: Home Park; Attendance: 8,946; Referee: Martin Bodenham

6 October 1992	Portsmouth (2)	2–0 (6–0 agg.)	Blackpool (3)	Portsmouth
19:45 BST	Whittingham 3', 65'			Stadium: Fratton Park; Attendance: 3,096

6 October 1992	Swindon Town (2)	3–2 (9–2 agg.)	Torquay United (4)	Swindon
19:45 BST	Hoddle 3'; White 11'; Mitchell 26'		Myers 66'; Foster 68'	Stadium: County Ground; Attendance: 3,293; Referee: Allan Gunn

6 October 1992	Wimbledon (1)	0–1 (3–2 agg.)	Bolton Wanderers (3)	Selhurst
20:00 BST			Philliskirk 47'	Stadium: Selhurst Park; Attendance: 1,987

7 October 1992	Chelsea (1)	1–0 (4–0 agg.)	Walsall (4)	Fulham
19:30 BST	Fleck 73' (pen.)			Stadium: Stamford Bridge; Attendance: 10,302; Referee: Paul Scoble

7 October 1992	Crewe Alexandra (4)	2–0 (2–0 agg.)	West Ham United (2)	Crewe
19:30 BST	Naylor 72'; Hignett 79'			Stadium: Gresty Road; Attendance: 5,427; Referee: Terry Lunt

7 October 1992	Everton (1)	3–0 (3–1 agg.)	Rotherham United (3)	Liverpool
19:30 BST	Rideout 24', 59'; Cottee 33' (pen.)			Stadium: Goodison Park; Attendance: 10,302; Referee: Keith Hackett

7 October 1992	Nottingham Forest (1)	2–1 (5–3 agg.)	Stockport County (3)	West Bridgford
19:30 BST	Black 19'; Gannon 87' (o.g.)		Beaumont 27'	Stadium: City Ground; Attendance: 15,573; Referee: John Kirkby

7 October 1992	Oldham Athletic (1)	0–0 (1–0 agg.)	Exeter City (3)	Oldham
19:30 BST				Stadium: Boundary Park; Attendance: 6,269

7 October 1992	Scarborough (4)	3–0 (3–2 agg.)	Coventry City (1)	Scarborough
19:30 BST	Mooney 72'; Foreman 89'; Hirst 90'			Stadium: Athletic Ground; Attendance: 2,633; Referee: Robbie Hart

7 October 1992	Southampton (1)	3–0 (3–0 agg.)	Gillingham (4)	Southampton
19:30 BST	Dowie 30'; Le Tissier 55', 62' (pen.)			Stadium: The Dell; Attendance: 6,764; Referee: Dermot Gallagher

7 October 1992	Wolverhampton Wanderers (2)	0–1 (2–4 agg.)	Notts County (2)	Wolverhampton
19:30 BST			O'Riordan 76'	Stadium: Molineux Stadium; Attendance: 11,146; Referee: Rodger Gifford

7 October 1992	Aston Villa (1)	2–1 (4–2 agg.)	Oxford United (2)	Birmingham
19:45 BST	Atkinson 11'; Richardson 90'		Cusack 88'	Stadium: Villa Park; Attendance: 19,808; Referee: Bob Nixon

7 October 1992	Brentford (2)	2–4 (3–7 agg.)	Tottenham Hotspur (1)	Brentford
19:45 BST	Blissett 21'; Millen 82'		Anderton 3'; Sheringham 8', 81' (pen.); Turner 50'	Stadium: Griffin Park; Attendance: 11,445; Referee: John Martin

7 October 1992	Charlton Athletic (2)	0–1 (0–1 agg.)	Bury (4)	Charlton
19:45 BST			Hulme 72'	Stadium: The Valley; Attendance: 2,083

7 October 1992	Derby County (2)	7–0 (7–1 agg.)	Southend United (2)	Derby
19:45 BST	Kitson 4'; Martin 12' (o.g.); Gabbiadini 42', 74'; Simpson 55', 80'; Johnson 84'			Stadium: Baseball Ground; Attendance: 13,328; Referee: Rodger Milford

7 October 1992	Millwall (2)	1–1 (a.e.t.) (2–2 agg.) (1–3 p)	Arsenal (1)	Millwall
19:45 BST	Dixon 25' (o.g.)		Campbell 17'	Stadium: The Den; Attendance: 18,500; Referee: David Elleray

7 October 1992	Middlesbrough (1)	1–3 (1–3 agg.)	Newcastle United (2)	Middlesbrough
19:45 BST	Wilkinson 56'		Kelly 40', 88'; O'Brien 79'	Stadium: Ayresome Park; Attendance: 24,390; Referee: Joe Worrall

7 October 1992	Norwich City (1)	2–0 (4–2 agg.)	Carlisle United (4)	Norwich
19:45 BST	Sutton 67', 77'			Stadium: Carrow Road; Attendance: 8,489; Referee: David Excell

7 October 1992	Reading (3)	0–2 (2–4 agg.)	Watford (2)	Reading
19:45 BST			Drysdale 34'; Lavin 88'	Stadium: Elm Park; Attendance: 7,386; Referee: Michael Pierce

7 October 1992	Sheffield United (1)	4–1 (5–3 agg.)	Bristol City (2)	Sheffield
19:45 BST	Whitehouse 5'; Bradshaw 33'; Deane 65', 73'		Cole 12'	Stadium: Bramall Lane; Attendance: 9,000; Referee: Alan Wilkie

7 October 1992	Stoke City (3)	1–2 (3–4 agg.)	Cambridge United (2)	Stoke-on-Trent
19:45 BST	Shaw 69'		Fowler 36'; Francis 80'	Stadium: Victoria Ground; Attendance: 10,732; Referee: Tom Fitzharris

7 October 1992	Bristol Rovers (2)	1–2 (a.e.t.) (1–2 agg.)	Manchester City (1)	Bath
20:00 BST	Reece 75'		Maddison 66' (o.g.); Holden 120'	Stadium: Twerton Park; Attendance: 7,823; Referee: David Frampton

7 October 1992	Manchester United (1)	1–0 (2–1 agg.)	Brighton & Hove Albion (3)	Trafford
20:00 BST	Hughes 14'			Stadium: Old Trafford; Attendance: 25,405; Referee: Stephen Lodge

27 October 1992	Scunthorpe United (4)	2–2 (3–6 agg.)	Leeds United (1)	Scunthorpe
19:30 GMT	Helliwell 29', 45'		Wallace 34'; Chapman 58'	Stadium: Glanford Park; Attendance: 7,419; Referee: John Lloyd

== Third round ==
Teams per tier in the competition at this stage
Premier League	Division One	Division Two	Division Three	Total
20 / 22	8 / 24	1 / 24	3 / 22	32 / 90

27 October 1992	Bury (4)	0–2	Queens Park Rangers (1)	Bury
19:30 GMT			Peacock 85'; Allen 90'	Stadium: Gigg Lane; Attendance: 4,680; Referee: Mike Reed

27 October 1992	Notts County (2)	2–3	Cambridge United (2)	Nottingham
19:45 GMT	Draper 51'; Agana 87'		Clayton 10'; Danzey 58'; White 84'	Stadium: Meadow Lane; Attendance: 3,742; Referee: Alf Buksh

27 October 1992	Plymouth Argyle (3)	3–3	Scarborough (4)	Plymouth
19:45 GMT	Dalton 49'; Joyce 80'; Nugent 83'		Curran 24'; Jules 51'; Ashdjian 87'	Stadium: Home Park; Attendance: 8,619; Referee: Rodger Gifford

27 October 1992	Portsmouth (2)	0–1	Ipswich Town (1)	Portsmouth
19:45 GMT			Thompson 6'	Stadium: Fratton Park; Attendance: 10,773; Referee: Rodger Milford

27 October 1992	Sheffield Wednesday (1)	7–1	Leicester City (2)	Sheffield
19:45 GMT	Hirst 19'; Worthington 33'; Bright 46', 54'; Watson 70', 75'; Bart-Williams 71'		Davison 79'	Stadium: Hillsborough Stadium; Attendance: 17,326; Referee: Ken Redfern

27 October 1992	Swindon Town (2)	0–1	Oldham Athletic (1)	Swindon Town
19:45 GMT			Bernard 71'	Stadium: County Ground; Attendance: 8,811; Referee: Ray Lewis

28 October 1992	Crewe Alexandra (4)	0–1	Nottingham Forest (1)	Crewe
19:30 GMT			Örlygsson 84'	Stadium: Gresty Road; Attendance: 7,042; Referee: John Lloyd

28 October 1992	Everton (1)	0–0	Wimbledon (1)	Liverpool
19:30 GMT				Stadium: Goodison Park; Attendance: 9,541; Referee: Allan Flood

28 October 1992	Southampton (1)	0–2	Crystal Palace (1)	Southampton
19:30 GMT			McGoldrick 10'; Salako 17'	Stadium: The Dell; Attendance: 9,060; Referee: Keith Burge

28 October 1992	Aston Villa (1)	1–0	Manchester United (1)	Birmingham
19:45 GMT	Saunders 75'			Stadium: Villa Park; Attendance: 35,964; Referee: Philip Don

28 October 1992	Blackburn Rovers (1)	2–0	Norwich City (1)	Blackburn
19:45 GMT	Shearer 32'; May 60'			Stadium: Ewood Park; Attendance: 14,216; Referee: Mike Peck

28 October 1992	Chelsea (1)	2–1	Newcastle United (2)	Fulham
19:45 GMT	Sinclair 59'; Harford 82'		Lee 77'	Stadium: Stamford Bridge; Attendance: 30,193; Referee: Keith Cooper

28 October 1992	Derby County (2)	1–1	Arsenal (1)	Derby
19:45 GMT	Simpson 72' (pen.)		Campbell 76'	Stadium: Baseball Ground; Attendance: 22,208; Referee: Stephen Lodge

28 October 1992	Manchester City (1)	0–1	Tottenham Hotspur (1)	Manchester
19:45 GMT			Samways 40'	Stadium: Maine Road; Attendance: 18,399; Referee: John Key

28 October 1992	Sheffield United (1)	0–0	Liverpool (1)	Sheffield
19:45 GMT				Stadium: Bramall Lane; Attendance: 17,856; Referee: Tony Ward

10 November 1992	Watford (2)	2–1	Leeds United (1)	Watford
19:45 GMT	Holdsworth 53'; Drysdale 72' (pen.)		McAllister 84'	Stadium: Vicarage Road; Attendance: ??? Referee: Vic Callow

=== Replays ===
10 November 1992	Wimbledon (1)	0–1	Everton (1)	Selhurst
20:00 GMT			Beardsley 86'	Stadium: Selhurst Park; Attendance: 3,686; Referee: David Axcell

11 November 1992	Scarborough (4)	2–1	Plymouth Argyle (3)	Scarborough
19:30 GMT	Mooney 53' Mockler 62'		Dalton 9'	Stadium: Athletic Ground; Attendance: 3,466; Referee: David Allison

11 November 1992	Liverpool (1)	3–0	Sheffield United (1)	Liverpool
19:30 GMT	McManaman 33', 42'; Marsh 84' (pen.)			Stadium: Anfield; Attendance: 17,654; Referee: Kelvin Morton

1 December 1992	Arsenal (1)	2–1	Derby County (2)	Highbury
19:45 GMT	Wright 7'; Campbell 14'		Pembridge 44' (pen.)	Stadium: Arsenal Stadium; Attendance: 24,587; Referee: Allan Gunn

== Fourth round ==
Teams per tier in the competition at this stage
Premier League	Division One	Division Two	Division Three	Total
13 / 22	2 / 24	0 / 24	1 / 22	16 / 90

1 December 1992	Cambridge United (2)	1–0	Oldham Athletic (1)	Cambridge
19:45 GMT	Rowett 45'			Stadium: Abbey Stadium; Attendance: 5,488; Referee: Roger Wiseman

1 December 1992	Liverpool (1)	1–1	Crystal Palace (1)	Liverpool
19:45 GMT	Marsh 76' (pen.)		Coleman 56'	Stadium: Anfield; Attendance: 18,525; Referee: Brian Hill

2 December 1992	Aston Villa (1)	2–2	Ipswich Town (1)	Birmingham
19:45 GMT	Atkinson 65'; Saunders 77'		Kiwomya 74', 83'	Stadium: Villa Park; Attendance: 21,545; Referee: John Martin

2 December 1992	Nottingham Forest (1)	2–0	Tottenham Hotspur (1)	West Bridgford
19:45 GMT	Woan 27'; Keane 66'			Stadium: City Ground; Attendance: 22,312; Referee: Peter Wright

2 December 1992	Sheffield Wednesday (1)	4–0	Queens Park Rangers (1)	Sheffield
19:45 GMT	Bright 30'; Hirst 32'; Palmer 66' Nilsson 87'			Stadium: Hillsborough Stadium; Attendance: 17,161; Referee: John Watson

2 December 1992	Everton (1)	2–2	Chelsea (1)	Liverpool
20:00 GMT	Beardsley 24'; Barlow 35'		Harford 31'; Stuart 77'	Stadium: Goodison Park; Attendance: 14,457; Referee: Howard King

9 December 1992	Blackburn Rovers (1)	6–1	Watford (2)	Blackburn
19:45 GMT	Atkins 25'; Shearer 30' 58'; Newell 53', 78'; Wegerle 84'		Furlong 61'	Stadium: Ewood Park; Attendance: 13,187; Referee: Alan Wilkie

6 January 1993	Scarborough (4)	0–1	Arsenal (1)	Scarborough
19:45 GMT			Winterburn 51'	Stadium: Athletic Ground; Attendance: 6,261; Referee: Keith Hackett

=== Replays ===
15 December 1992	Ipswich Town (1)	1–0	Aston Villa (1)	Ipswich
19:30 GMT	Kiwomya 57'			Stadium: Portman Road; Attendance: 19,196; Referee: Mike James

16 December 1992	Chelsea (1)	1–0	Everton (1)	Fulham
19:45 GMT	Townsend 19'			Stadium: Stamford Bridge (stadium); Attendance: 19,496; Referee: Jim Borrett

16 December 1992	Crystal Palace (1)	2–1 (a.e.t.)	Liverpool (1)	Selhurst
20:00 GMT	Watts 15'; Thorn 101'		Marsh 26' (pen.)	Stadium: Selhurst Park; Attendance: 19,622; Referee: Peter Foakes

== Quarter-finals ==
Teams per tier in the competition at this stage
Premier League	Division One	Division Two	Division Three	Total
7 / 22	1 / 24	0 / 24	0 / 22	8 / 90

6 January 1993	Blackburn Rovers (1)	3–2	Cambridge United (2)	Blackburn
19:45 GMT	Newell 60', 87'; Wegerle 77'		Clayton 49'; Heathcote 89'	Stadium: Ewood Park; Attendance: 14,165; Referee: John Lloyd

6 January 1993	Crystal Palace (1)	3–1	Chelsea (1)	Selhurst
20:00 GMT	Coleman 5'; Nfah 34'; Watts 48'		Townsend 18'	Stadium: Selhurst Park; Attendance: 28,510; Referee: Gerald Ashby

12 January 1993	Arsenal (1)	2–0	Nottingham Forest (1)	Highbury
19:45 GMT	Wright 55', 78'			Stadium: Arsenal Stadium; Attendance: 25,600; Referee: Rodger Gifford

19 January 1993	Ipswich Town (1)	1–1	Sheffield Wednesday (1)	Ipswich
19:45 GMT	Whitton 83' (pen.)		Sheridan 49'	Stadium: Portman Road; Attendance: 5,488; Referee: Philip Don

=== Replays ===
3 February 1993	Sheffield Wednesday (1)	1–0	Ipswich Town (1)	Sheffield
19:45 GMT	Warhurst 53'			Stadium: Hillsborough Stadium; Attendance: 26,828; Referee: Vic Callow

== Semi-finals ==
Teams per tier in the competition at this stage
Premier League	Division One	Division Two	Division Three	Total
4 / 22	0 / 24	0 / 24	0 / 22	4 / 90

=== First leg ===
7 February 1993
15:00 GMT

Crystal Palace	1–3	Arsenal
Osborn 54' (pen.)		Wright 10' (pen.); Smith 21' 66'

Selhurst Park, Selhurst
Attendance: 26,508
Referee: John Martin

GK	1	(England) Nigel Martyn
RB	3	(England) Richard Shaw
CB	5	(Wales) Eric Young
CB	6	(England) Andy Thorn
LB	2	(England) Lee Sinnott (substituted off) 45'
DM	11	(Republic of Ireland) Eddie McGoldrick
RM	9	(Saint Kitts and Nevis) Bobby Bowry (yellow card)
CM	8	(England) Geoff Thomas (c)
LM	10	(England) Simon Rodger
SS	7	(England) Simon Osborn
ST	4	(Wales) Chris Coleman
Substitutes:
F	12	(England) George Ndah
F	14	(England) Grant Watts (substituted on) 45'
Manager:
(England) Steve Coppell

GK	1	(England) David Seaman
RB	2	(England) Lee Dixon
CB	5	(England) Andy Linighan
CB	6	(England) Tony Adams (c) (yellow card)
LB	3	(England) Nigel Winterburn (yellow card)
CM	7	(England) Ian Selley
CM	4	(England) David Hillier
AM	10	(England) Paul Merson
RF	11	(England) Kevin Campbell
CF	9	(England) Alan Smith
LF	8	(England) Ian Wright (substituted off) 84'
Substitutes:
D	12	(Northern Ireland) Steve Morrow	(substituted on) 84'
M	14	(England) Jimmy Carter
Manager:
(Scotland) George Graham

10 February 1993
20:00 GMT

Blackburn Rovers	2–4	Sheffield Wednesday
Wegerle 9'; Palmer 37' (o.g.)		Harkes 14'; Sheridan 20'; Warhurst 26' 30'

Ewood Park, Blackburn
Attendance: 17,283
Referee: Tony Ward

GK	1	(England) Bobby Mimms
RB	2	(Norway) Henning Berg
CB	5	(Scotland) Colin Hendry (c)
CB	6	(Sweden) Patrik Andersson
LB	3	(England) Alan Wright
RM	7	(England) Stuart Ripley (substituted off) 52'
CM	8	(England) Gordon Cowans
CM	4	(England) Tim Sherwood (substituted off) 71'
LM	11	(England) Jason Wilcox
CF	9	(United States) Roy Wegerle
CF	10	(England) Mike Newell (yellow card)
Substitutes:
M	12	(England) Mark Atkins (substituted on) 52'
D	14	(England) David May (substituted on) 71'
Manager:
(Scotland) Kenny Dalglish

GK	1	(England) Chris Woods
RB	2	(Sweden) Roland Nilsson
CB	4	(England) Carlton Palmer
CB	6	(England) Peter Shirtliff (c)
LB	3	(Northern Ireland) Nigel Worthington
RM	8	(England) Chris Waddle
CM	7	(Northern Ireland) Danny Wilson (yellow card)
CM	11	(Republic of Ireland) John Sheridan
LM	5	(United States) John Harkes
CF	10	(England) Chris Bart-Williams (substituted off) 57'
CF	9	(England) Paul Warhurst
Substitutes:
F	12	(England) Nigel Jemson (substituted on) 80'
D	14	(England) Nigel Pearson (substituted on) 57' (substituted off) 80'
Player-manager:
(England) Trevor Francis

=== Second leg ===
10 March 1993
20:00 GMT

Arsenal	2–0	Crystal Palace
Linighan 6'; Wright 45'

Arsenal Stadium, Highbury
Attendance: 28,584
Referee: Roger Milford
Arsenal win 5–1 on aggregate

GK	1	(England) David Seaman
RB	2	(England) Lee Dixon
CB	5	(England) Andy Linighan
CB	6	(England) Tony Adams (c)
LB	3	(England) Nigel Winterburn (substituted off) 84'
RM	7	(England) Jimmy Carter
CM	4	(England) Paul Davis
CM	11	(Northern Ireland) Steve Morrow
LM	10	(England) Paul Merson
CF	9	(England) Alan Smith (substituted off) 86'
CF	8	(England) Ian Wright
Substitutes:
M	12	(England) David Hillier (substituted on) 84'
F	14	(England) Kevin Campbell (substituted on) 86'
Manager:
(Scotland) George Graham

GK	1	(England) Nigel Martyn
SW	11	(Republic of Ireland) Eddie McGoldrick
RB	2	(England) John Humphrey
CB	5	(Wales) Eric Young
LB	6	(England) Dean Gordon
RM	8	(England) Geoff Thomas (c)
CM	7	(England) Simon Osborn
CM	3	(England) Gareth Southgate
LM	10	(England) Simon Rodger
SS	4	(Wales) Chris Coleman
ST	9	(England) Grant Watts (substituted off) 55'
Substitutes:
D	12	(England) Richard Shaw
F	14	(England) George Ndah (substituted on) 55'
Manager:
(England) Steve Coppell

14 March 1993
15:00 GMT

Sheffield Wednesday	2–1	Blackburn Rovers
Hirst 68'; Bright 73'		Andersson 34'

Hillsborough Stadium, Sheffield
Attendance: 30,048
Referee: Ken Redfern
Sheffield Wednesday win 6–3 on aggregate

GK	1	(England) Chris Woods
RB	2	(Sweden) Roland Nilsson
CB	4	(England) Carlton Palmer
CB	6	(England) Viv Anderson (c)
LB	3	(England) Phil King (substituted off) 54'
RM	8	(England) Chris Waddle
CM	7	(Northern Ireland) Danny Wilson
CM	11	(Republic of Ireland) John Sheridan (substituted off) 85'
LM	5	(England) Graham Hyde
CF	10	(England) Mark Bright
CF	9	(England) Paul Warhurst
Substitutes:
F	12	(England) David Hirst (substituted on) 54'
D	14	(England) Simon Stewart (substituted on) 85'
Player-manager:
(England) Trevor Francis

GK	1	(England) Bobby Mimms
RB	2	(England) David May
CB	5	(Scotland) Colin Hendry (c)
CB	8	(Sweden) Patrik Andersson (substituted off) 64'
LB	3	(Norway) Henning Berg (yellow card)
RM	7	(England) Stuart Ripley
CM	6	(England) Mark Atkins
CM	4	(England) Tim Sherwood (yellow card)
LM	11	(England) Jason Wilcox (yellow card)
CF	9	(England) Steve Livingstone (substituted off) 66'
CF	10	(England) Mike Newell
Substitutes:
D	12	(England) Richard Brown (substituted on) 64'
F	14	(United States) Roy Wegerle (substituted on) 66'
Manager:
(Scotland) Kenny Dalglish

== Final ==
Teams per tier in the competition at this stage
Premier League	Division One	Division Two	Division Three	Total
2 / 22	0 / 24	0 / 24	0 / 22	2 / 90

18 April 1993
17:00 BST

Arsenal	2–1	Sheffield Wednesday
Merson 20'; Morrow 68'		Harkes 8'

Wembley Stadium, London
Attendance: 74,007
Referee: Allan Gunn (Sussex)
Arsenal win the 1993 Football League Cup

GK	1	(England) David Seaman
RB	22	(Republic of Ireland) David O'Leary
CB	5	(England) Andy Linighan
CB	6	(England) Tony Adams (c)
LB	3	(England) Nigel Winterburn
CM	11	(England) Ray Parlour
CM	14	(England) Paul Davis
CM	15	(Northern Ireland) Steve Morrow
AM	10	(England) Paul Merson
CF	8	(England) Ian Wright
CF	7	(England) Kevin Campbell
Substitutes:
M	4	(England) Ian Selley
F	9	(England) Alan Smith
Manager:
(Scotland) George Graham

GK	1	(England) Chris Woods
RB	2	(Sweden) Roland Nilsson
CB	4	(England) Carlton Palmer	Yellow card
CB	6	(England) Viv Anderson (c)
LB	16	(England) Phil King		(substituted off) 83'
RM	8	(England) Chris Waddle
CM	7	(Northern Ireland) Danny Wilson		(substituted off) 74'
CM	11	(Republic of Ireland) John Sheridan
LM	15	(United States) John Harkes
CF	9	(England) Paul Warhurst
CF	10	(England) Mark Bright	Yellow card
Substitutes:
F	5	(England) David Hirst		(substituted on) 74'
M	17	(England) Graham Hyde		(substituted on) 83'
Player-manager:
(England) Trevor Francis
