= Chris Curran =

Chris Curran may refer to:

- Chris Curran (actor) (died 1996), Irish actor, singer and musician
- Chris Curran (Australian footballer) (1974–2018), former Australian rules footballer
- Chris Curran (footballer, born January 1971) (born 1971), English footballer for Crewe Alexandra, Scarborough and Carlisle United
- Chris Curran (footballer, born September 1971) (born 1971), English footballer for Torquay United, Plymouth Argyle and Exeter City
