= Lee Nogan =

Welsh footballer & manager (born 1969)

Personal information
- Full name: Lee Martin Nogan
- Date of birth: 21 May 1969 (age 57)
- Place of birth: Cardiff, Wales
- Height: 5 ft 10 in (1.78 m)
- Position: Forward

Senior career*
Years	Team	Apps	(Gls)
1987–1991	Oxford United	64	(10)
1987	→ Brentford (loan)	11	(2)
1987	→ Southend United (loan)	6	(1)
1991–1995	Watford	105	(26)
1994	→ Southend United (loan)	5	(0)
1995–1997	Reading	91	(26)
1997	→ Notts County (loan)	6	(0)
1997–1999	Grimsby Town	74	(10)
1999–2000	Darlington	49	(6)
2000–2001	Luton Town	7	(1)
2001–2005	York City	165	(35)
2005–2006	Harrogate Town		
2006	Pickering Town		
2006–2009	Whitby Town		
2011–2015	FC Halifax Town	0	(0)
Total		583	(117)

International career
- Wales U21
- Wales B
1992–1995	Wales	2	(0)

Managerial career
- 2006–2007: Whitby Town
- * Club domestic league appearances and goals

Lee Martin Nogan (born 21 May 1969) is a Welsh former professional footballer and manager. He is the elder brother of Kurt Nogan.

A forward, he began his career at Oxford United in 1987. He spent four years at the club and also had loan spells at Brentford and Southend United. He was sold to Watford for £350,000 in December 1991, where he would remain for another four years. He lost his first-team place after a change of manager in 1993 and again joined Southend United on loan. He was sold to Reading for £250,000 in January 1995 and played in the club's defeat in the 1995 First Division play-off final at Wembley Stadium. He spent time on loan at Notts County before he joined Grimsby Town for a £170,000 fee in August 1997. He helped the club to win the Football League Trophy in 1998 and then to win promotion out of the Second Division via the play-offs at the end of the 1997–98 season. He moved on to Luton Town in 2000 before signing with York City in February 2001. He was also instated as assistant manager in May 2003 and left the club two years later. He scored a total of 139 goals in 673 league and cup appearances during a 19-year professional career and also won two caps for Wales.

He was appointed manager at Whitby Town in June 2006 before resigning in October 2007. He remained at the club as a player and assistant manager before joining FC Halifax Town as an assistant to Neil Aspin. He followed Aspin to Gateshead in November 2015 and then Port Vale in October 2017.

== Club career ==
=== Oxford United ===
Nogan turned professional at Oxford United under Maurice Evans. He joined Brentford on loan in March 1987. He spent the remainder of the 1986–87 season at Griffin Park, scoring two goals in 11 Third Division games for Steve Perryman's "Bees". He then played four matches and scored one goal as the "U's" were relegated out of the First Division at the end of the 1987–88 season under the stewardship of Mark Lawrenson. He also played nine games on loan at Third Division Southend United, scoring one goal for the "Shrimpers". He made only occasional appearances for Oxford in the 1988–89 and 1989–90 campaigns, playing just eight first-team games under new manager Brian Horton. He established himself as a regular first-team player at the Manor Ground during the 1990–91 campaign, scoring seven goals from 40 appearances. He scored five goals from 25 games in the first half of the 1991–92 season.

=== Watford ===
Nogan joined Second Division rivals Watford for a £350,000 fee in December 1991, managed by former Brentford boss Steve Perryman. He ended the 1991–92 campaign with five goals from 23 games, helping the "Hornets" to a tenth-place finish. He scored 12 goals from 49 appearances in the 1992–93 season as Watford slipped to 16th-position. He lost his first-team place under new manager Glenn Roeder in the 1993–94 season and scored only four goals from his 30 matches as Watford narrowly avoided relegation. He also returned to Southend United on loan, now in the First Division and under the stewardship of Peter Taylor. Again, his stay at Roots Hall was brief, however, and he played just five games for the "Seasiders". He returned to Vicarage Road and scored nine goals from 15 appearances in the first half of the 1994–95 campaign.

=== Reading ===
Nogan was sold to Reading for £250,000 in January 1995. He scored 12 goals in 23 appearances, including a hat-trick in a 3–3 draw with Port Vale at Elm Park, to help the "Royals" to secure a second-place finish in the First Division at the end of the 1994–95 season. A reduction in the size of the Premier League denied the club automatic promotion however. Though they eliminated Tranmere Rovers in the play-off semi-finals, they lost out to Bolton Wanderers in the play-off final at Wembley Stadium. Nogan had put Reading ahead in the fourth minute with the first goal of the game, and by half-time they were 2–0 up, but two goals in the final 15 minutes saw Bolton force extra time and go on to claim a 4–3 victory. Reading then struggled in the 1995–96 campaign, only managing a 19th-place finish, with Nogan contributing 11 goals from his 45 appearances. He went on to score a further six goals across 25 appearances in the 1996–97 season as joint-managers Mick Gooding and Jimmy Quinn led the club to an 18th-place finish. Nogan also enjoyed a spell on loan with Notts County, playing six games during his short stay at Meadow Lane as the "Magpies" struggled at the foot of the Second Division.

=== Grimsby Town ===
Nogan signed with Grimsby Town for a £170,000 fee in August 1997, with manager Alan Buckley looking to replace Clive Mendonca. He formed effective partnership with Jack Lester, and scored 13 goals in 54 appearances across the 1997–98 season to help the "Mariners" to reach the Second Division play-off final at Wembley Stadium. There they defeated Northampton Town 1–0 to secure promotion. He also played in the 1998 Football League Trophy final, as Grimsby won the Football League Trophy for the first time with a 2–1 extra-time victory over AFC Bournemouth. However, he struggled back in the First Division, scoring just three goals in 42 matches across the 1998–99 campaign, as he failed to adapt to the pace and physicality of the higher division. A lack of other options at Blundell Park left him unable to be replaced up front and caused him to receive criticism from some supporters as his confidence dipped.

=== Darlington ===
Nogan joined Darlington on a free transfer in July 1999. A strike partnership with veteran forward Marco Gabbiadini failed to materialise however, as loan signings such as Craig Russell were preferred by "Quakers" manager David Hodgson, though Nogan still featured 39 times in the 1999–2000 season, contributing five goals. He came on as an 84th minute substitute for Peter Duffield in the Third Division play-off final, as Darlington lost 1–0 to Peterborough United. Shortly after Gary Bennett took charge at Feethams at the start of the 2000–01 season, Nogan was allowed to leave the club on a free transfer.

=== Luton Town ===
Nogan moved back up to the Second Division to Luton Town as one of manager Lil Fuccillo's first signings at Kenilworth Road. On 19 December, he opened the scoring as Luton defeated his former club Darlington 2–0 in the second round of the FA Cup. He scored against another former club four days later, though this was during a 4–1 defeat at Reading. He played just 11 times for the "Hatters" and scored just the two goals, as Luton suffered relegation at the end of the 2000–01 season under the stewardship of Joe Kinnear.

=== York City ===
Nogan signed with York City in February 2001; manager Terry Dolan said that "we needed a striker... with Chris Iwelumo finishing his time here it would have left us with just David McNiven and Scott Emmerson... Lee is experienced and hopefully that will help David McNiven and it also gives Alex Mathie a lot more breathing space to fully recover before he comes back." He proved to be a key player in the club's upturn in form in the second half of the 2000–01 season, displaying hunger and a high work rate as he scored six goals from 16 appearances. He scored 13 goals from 49 appearances for the "Minstermen" throughout the 2001–02 season, and made a further 50 appearances in the 2002–03 campaign, scoring six goals.

He was released in May 2003 following what was described as "drastic cost-cutting measures", though he stayed on at the club as a player. Assistant manager to rookie manager Chris Brass. He finished as York's top-scorer in the 2003–04 season with nine goals. However, he was unable to prevent them from suffering relegation from the Football League to the Conference. He remained at Bootham Crescent after relegation. He scored three goals from 24 games in the 2004–05 season before leaving the club when caretaker manager Viv Busby was succeeded by Billy McEwan in February. He went on to join Conference North side Harrogate Town in March 2005 after being signed by manager Neil Aspin, his former teammate at Darlington. He later played for Pickering Town, who were managed by former York teammate Alex Mathie.

== International career ==
Nogan won caps for the Wales under-21 and B team before he won his first senior Wales cap in 1992. He picked up his second and final cap three years later.

== Coaching career ==
=== Whitby Town ===
Nogan was appointed as manager of Whitby Town in June 2006. He led the club to an 11th-place finish in the Northern Premier League Premier Division at the end of the 2006–07 season, though they did suffer early cup qualification exits to Frickley Athletic and Woodley Sports. The "Blues" suffered a poor start to the 2007–08 campaign, and Nogan resigned on 22 October 2007 following an FA Trophy defeat at Ossett Town. Despite being a former manager, he continued to play for the club, helping them to avoid relegation at the end of the season. He served as assistant manager to manager Graeme Clark during the 2008–09 season, and continued to make first-team appearances.

=== Assistant to Neil Aspin ===
Nogan went on to work as assistant to FC Halifax Town manager Neil Aspin. On 1 October 2014, now aged 45, he came on as a 7th-minute substitute in a 3–0 defeat at Guiseley in the first round of the West Riding County Cup. He was taken off to be replaced by Aspin on 69 minutes. Aspin was appointed as Gateshead manager on 27 November 2015. The following day he hired Nogan to again work as his assistant. Having been recruited by League Two club Port Vale, Aspin again took Nogan with him to work as a coach on 6 October 2017. He departed Vale Park alongside Aspin on 30 January 2019.

== Personal life ==
Nogan has worked as a PE teacher in primary schools since ending his playing career. His younger brother, Kurt Nogan, is also a former professional footballer.

== Career statistics ==
=== Club statistics ===
Appearances and goals by club, season and competition
Club	Season	League			FA Cup		Other		Total	
Club	Season	Division	Apps	Goals	Apps	Goals	Apps	Goals	Apps	Goals
Oxford United	1986–87	First Division	0	0	0	0	0	0	0	0
Oxford United	1987–88	First Division	3	0	0	0	1	1	4	1
Oxford United	1988–89	Second Division	3	0	0	0	0	0	3	0
Oxford United	1989–90	Second Division	4	0	1	0	0	0	5	0
Oxford United	1990–91	Second Division	32	5	2	1	6	1	40	7
Oxford United	1991–92	Second Division	22	5	0	0	3	0	25	5
Oxford United	Total		64	10	3	1	10	2	77	13
Brentford (loan)	1986–87	Third Division	11	2	0	0	0	0	11	2
Southend United (loan)	1987–88	Third Division	6	1	0	0	3	1	9	2
Watford	1991–92	Second Division	23	5	0	0	0	0	23	5
Watford	1992–93	First Division	42	11	1	1	6	0	49	12
Watford	1993–94	First Division	26	3	1	0	3	1	30	4
Watford	1994–95	First Division	14	7	0	0	1	2	15	9
Watford	Total		105	26	2	1	10	3	117	30
Southend United (loan)	1993–94	First Division	5	0	0	0	0	0	5	0
Reading	1994–95	First Division	20	10	0	0	3	2	23	12
Reading	1995–96	First Division	39	10	2	0	4	1	45	11
Reading	1996–97	First Division	23	6	0	0	2	0	25	6
Reading	Total		82	26	2	0	9	3	93	29
Notts County (loan)	1996–97	Second Division	6	0	0	0	0	0	6	0
Grimsby Town	1997–98	Second Division	36	8	4	2	14	3	54	13
Grimsby Town	1998–99	First Division	38	2	0	0	4	1	42	3
Grimsby Town	Total		74	10	4	2	18	4	96	16
Darlington	1999–2000	Third Division	31	2	3	0	5	3	39	5
Darlington	2000–01	Third Division	18	4	0	0	1	0	19	4
Darlington	Total		49	6	3	0	6	3	58	9
Luton Town	2000–01	Second Division	7	1	3	1	1	0	11	2
York City	2000–01	Third Division	16	6	0	0	0	0	16	6
York City	2001–02	Third Division	42	13	5	0	2	0	49	13
York City	2002–03	Third Division	46	5	2	0	2	1	50	6
York City	2003–04	Third Division	39	8	1	1	2	0	42	9
York City	2004–05	Conference National	22	3	1	0	1	0	24	3
York City	Total		165	35	9	1	7	1	181	37
FC Halifax Town	2014–15	Conference Premier	0	0	0	0	1	0	1	0
Career total (Note: Statistics for Whitby Town not recorded.)			574	117	26	6	65	17	665	140

=== International playing statistics ===
Wales national team
Year	Apps	Goals
1992	1	0
1993	0	0
1994	0	0
1995	1	0
Total	2	0

=== Managerial statistics ===
Managerial record by team and tenure
Team	From	To	Record					Ref.
Team	From	To	P	W	D	L	Win %	Ref.
Whitby Town	24 June 2006	22 October 2007	65	27	30	8	41.5	
Total			65	27	30	8	41.5	

== Honours ==
Grimsby Town

- Football League Second Division play-offs: 1998
- Football League Trophy: 1997–98
