= 2000–01 Luton Town F.C. season =

English football club season

Luton Town
2000–01 season
- Chairman: Mike Watson-Challis
- Manager: Lennie Lawrence (until 4 July); Ricky Hill (from 10 July to 15 November); Lil Fuccillo (from 16 November to 8 February); Joe Kinnear (from 8 February)
- Second Division: 22nd (relegated)
- FA Cup: Third round
- League Cup: Second round
- Football League Trophy: First round
- Top goalscorer: League: Liam George (7); All: Liam George (9)
- Highest home attendance: 8,677 (vs. Queens Park Rangers, FA Cup third round, 6 January)
- Lowest home attendance: 3,175 (vs. Peterborough United, League Cup first round, 22 August)
- Average home league attendance: 5,672
Home colours	Away colours

The 2000–01 season was the 115th season in the history of Luton Town Football Club, the club's 80th consecutive year in the Football League and its 83rd overall. Luton ended the season relegated from the Second Division, dropping into the basement level of League football for the first time since the 1967–68 season. The club went through a total of three managers following the departure of Lennie Lawrence; firstly Ricky Hill, then Lil Fuccillo, and eventually settling on Irishman Joe Kinnear. Under Kinnear's management, Luton underwent an initial resurgence, winning five of out of his first seven games. However, they failed to win any of their games in the final quarter of the season and ultimately slipped into the Third Division. Luton won only nine league games all season, setting a club record for the fewest wins over a 46-game season.

This article covers the period from 1 July 2000 to 30 June 2001.

== Season summary ==
One of new chairman Mike Watson-Challis' first acts was, on 4 July, to sack manager Lennie Lawrence and look to appoint his own man. Ex-player and fan favourite Ricky Hill was appointed a week later, and was provided with the resources to build his own squad. One signing was that of goalkeeper Mark Ovendale from AFC Bournemouth, who cost £425,000; the most the club had spent on a player since the 1995–96 season when they were competing in the First Division. Ovendale struggled to make an impact, which was the story of most of Hill's acquisitions, who included among their number untested foreign players Friedrich Breitenfelder, Petri Helin and Kent Karlsen.

Hill's reign began with a defeat to Notts County and did not improve from there; one win in their first ten league games left Luton in the relegation zone and the fans voicing their displeasure. A penalty shootout victory over Peterborough United in the League Cup set up a tie with Premier League side Sunderland, but Luton collapsed to a 5–1 aggregate defeat. One further league win followed, but even more defeats left Luton in 23rd place by early November. Hill resigned on 15 November to be replaced by his assistant, another former Luton player, Lil Fuccillo. John Moore, who had led the club to their highest-ever league finish in the 1986–87 season and was in charge of the youth team, was installed as Fuccillo's assistant. Luton's fortunes failed to improve under this tenure, suffering seven further league defeats, though a run to the Third Round of the FA Cup did offer some respite.

With the club failing to impress on the pitch and facing the prospect of relegation, Watson-Challis acted to recruit a Director of Football to oversee "all football matters". Former Wimbledon manager Joe Kinnear was appointed to this role on 8 February, but his first act was to immediately demote Fuccillo to assistant and place himself in charge. Kinnear's arrival prompted an initial resurgence in form – Luton won five of their next seven games and were one point away from 20th position, and safety, by 6 March. However, they failed to win again during the campaign and, on 24 April, were relegated to the Third Division for the first time in 33 years following a 1–0 loss to Rotherham United.

With the season drawing to a close, Kinnear signed striker Steve Howard from nearby Northampton Town for a fee of £50,000, released five players, and transfer listed four others.

== Match results ==
Luton Town results given first.

=== Legend ===
Win	Draw	Loss

=== Friendlies ===
Date	Opponent	Venue	Result	Attendance	Scorers	Notes
22 July 2000	Bromley	Away	5–2	Unknown	Fotiadis, George (2), Mark Stein, Brennan	
26 July 2000	St Albans City	Away	2–1	900	Carter, A. Douglas	Luton XI
27 July 2000	Welling United	Away	1–0	Unknown	Mark Stein	
31 July 2000	Grimsby Town	Away	1–1	3,475	Fotiadis	
2 August 2000	Hull City	Away	1–0	1,415	Mark Stein	
4 August 2000	Rushden & Diamonds	Away	5–1	3,065	Mark Stein (2), Spring (pen), Taylor, Boyce	

=== Football League Second Division ===
All results, goals, attendances etc. taken from Soccerbase

Date	Opponent	Venue	Result	Attendance	Scorers	Notes
12 August 2000	Notts County	Home	0–1	7,059	–	
19 August 2000	Wigan Athletic	Away	1–2	6,518	Watts	
26 August 2000	AFC Bournemouth	Home	1–0	5,221	Spring (pen)	
28 August 2000	Wycombe Wanderers	Away	1–1	6,001	Kandol	
2 September 2000	Rotherham United	Away	1–1	4,061	Fotiadis	
9 September 2000	Northampton Town	Home	0–2	6,712	–	
12 September 2000	Walsall	Home	0–0	4,362	–	
16 September 2000	Swansea City	Away	0–4	6,011	–	
23 September 2000	Swindon Town	Home	2–3	4,933	Stein, George	
30 September 2000	Bristol Rovers	Away	3–3	7,901	Kandol (2), George	
8 October 2000	Millwall	Home	0–1	5,345	–	
13 October 2000	Cambridge United	Away	1–2	6,191	Stein	
17 October 2000	Oxford United	Away	0–0	4,537	–	
21 October 2000	Brentford	Home	3–1	5,382	Stuart Douglas (2), Spring (pen)	
28 October 2000	Wrexham	Home	3–4	5,341	Stein, Watts, George	
4 November 2000	Bury	Away	1–1	2,861	Helin	
11 November 2000	Bristol City	Home	0–3	6,595	–	
25 November 2000	Port Vale	Home	0–3	4,194	–	
2 December 2000	Stoke City	Away	3–1	12,389	McLaren, Thomson (2)	
16 December 2000	Colchester United	Home	0–3	4,791	–	
23 December 2000	Reading	Away	1–4	10,771	Nogan	
26 December 2000	Peterborough United	Home	3–2	7,374	Spring, Holmes, Boyce	
30 December 2000	Wigan Athletic	Home	0–2	5,332	–	
1 January 2001	AFC Bournemouth	Away	2–3	5,411	Fotiadis, Locke	
12 January 2001	Wycombe Wanderers	Home	1–2	4,551	Locke	
23 January 2001	Oldham Athletic	Home	0–2	3,011	–	
10 February 2001	Northampton Town	Away	1–0	6,633	Douglas	
13 February 2001	Notts County	Away	3–1	4,333	Boyce, George, Fotiadis	
17 February 2001	Swansea City	Home	5–3	7,085	Mansell (2), Douglas, Rowland, George	
20 February 2001	Walsall	Away	1–3	4,816	Spring	
24 February 2001	Swindon Town	Away	3–1	7,160	Rowland, Boyce, Mansell	
28 February 2001	Bristol Rovers	Home	0–0	7,405	–	
6 March 2001	Cambridge United	Home	1–0	6,370	Taylor	
10 March 2001	Millwall	Away	0–1	11,691	–	
27 March 2001	Peterborough United	Away	1–1	5,425	Mansell	
31 March 2001	Colchester United	Away	1–3	4,271	Howard (pen)	
3 April 2001	Reading	Home	1–1	6,132	own goal	
7 April 2001	Stoke City	Home	1–2	6,456	Mansell	
10 April 2001	Oxford United	Home	1–1	6,010	Watts	
14 April 2001	Oldham Athletic	Home	0–0	4,886	–	
16 April 2001	Wrexham	Away	1–3	3,339	Watts	
21 April 2001	Bury	Home	1–2	4,902	George	
24 April 2001	Rotherham United	Home	0–1	4,854	–	
28 April 2001	Bristol City	Away	1–3	9,161	George	
3 May 2001	Brentford	Away	2–2	3,287	Howard, McLaren	
5 May 2001	Port Vale	Home	1–1	5,260	Howard	

=== FA Cup ===
Round	Date	Opponent	Venue	Result	Attendance	Scorers	Notes
First round	17 November 2000	Rushden & Diamonds	Home	1–0	5,771	George	
Second round	9 December 2000	Darlington	Away	0–0	3,667	–	
Second round replay	19 December 2000	Darlington	Home	2–0	3,563	Nogan, McLaren	
Third round	6 January 2001	Queens Park Rangers	Home	3–3	8,677	Fotiadis, George, Douglas	
Third round replay	17 January 2001	Queens Park Rangers	Away	1–2	14,395	Mansell	

=== Football League Cup ===
Round	Date	Opponent	Venue	Result	Attendance	Scorers	Notes
First round first leg	22 August 2000	Peterborough United	Home	0–0	3,175	–	
First round second leg	5 September 2000	Peterborough United	Away	2–2 (aet)	4,286	Stein, Scarlett	^{[A]}
Second round first leg	19 September 2000	Sunderland	Away	0–3	24,668	–	
Second round second leg	26 September 2000	Sunderland	Home	1–2	5,262	Kandol	

=== Football League Trophy ===
Round	Date	Opponent	Venue	Result	Attendance	Scorers	Notes
Southern Section First Round	5 December 2000	Peterborough United	Away	0–1	2,075	–	

== League table ==
Pos	Team	Pld	W	D	L	GF	GA	GD	Pts	Qualification or relegation
20	Swindon Town	46	13	13	20	47	65	−18	52	
21	Bristol Rovers (R)	46	12	15	19	53	57	−4	51	Relegation to Football League Third Division
22	Luton Town (R)	46	9	13	24	52	80	−28	40	Relegation to Football League Third Division
23	Swansea City (R)	46	8	13	25	47	73	−26	37	Relegation to Football League Third Division
24	Oxford United (R)	46	7	6	33	53	100	−47	27	Relegation to Football League Third Division

Rules for classification: 1) Points; 2) Goal difference; 3) Goals scored
(R) Relegated

== Player statistics ==
Last match played on 5 May 2001. Players with a zero in every column only appeared as unused substitutes.

Pos.	Name	League		FA Cup		League Cup		FL Trophy		Total		Discipline	
Pos.	Name	Apps	Goals	Apps	Goals	Apps	Goals	Apps	Goals	Apps	Goals	Yellow card	Red card
MF	(England) Matthew Taylor	45	1	4	0	4	0	1	0	54	1	0	0
MF	(England) Matthew Spring	41	4	5	0	4	0	1	0	51	4	0	0
FW	(Republic of Ireland) Liam George	37 (6)	7	4	2	3 (1)	0	0	0	44 (7)	9	0	0
DF	(England) Emmerson Boyce	42	3	2 (1)	0	4	0	0	0	48 (1)	3	0	0
GK	(England) Paul McLaren	35	2	3	1	4	0	1	0	43	3	0	0
FW	(England) Mark Stein	19 (11)	3	1 (1)	0	3	1	0 (1)	0	23 (13)	4	0	0
DF	(England) Julian Watts	26 (2)	4	3	0	4	0	0	0	33 (2)	4	0	0
GK	(England) Mark Ovendale	26	0	2	0	4	0	1	0	33	0	0	0
DF	(England) Adam Locke	17 (8)	2	2 (1)	0	1 (1)	0	1	0	21 (10)	2	0	0
DF	(Finland) Petri Helin	23	1	3	0	0	0	1	0	27	1	0	0
FW	(England) Andrew Fotiadis	12 (10)	3	3	1	1	0	1	0	17 (10)	4	0	0
DF	(Scotland) Stuart Fraser	10 (5)	0	4	0	4	0	1	0	19 (5)	0	0	0
GK	(England) Nathan Abbey	20	0	3	0	0	0	0	0	23	0	0	0
FW	(England) Stuart Douglas	15 (6)	4	1 (1)	1	0	0	0	0	16 (7)	5	0	0
MF	(England) Peter Holmes	12 (6)	1	1	0	2 (1)	0	0	0	15 (7)	1	0	0
DF	(England) Richard Dryden	20	0	0	0	0	0	0	0	20	0	0	0
MF	(England) Lee Mansell	17 (1)	5	1	1	0	0	0	0	18 (1)	6	0	0
FW	(Democratic Republic of the Congo) Trésor Kandol	6 (7)	3	0	0	2 (1)	1	0	0	8 (8)	4	0	0
FW	(England) Peter Thomson	4 (7)	2	1 (1)	0	1 (1)	0	1	0	7 (9)	2	0	0
DF	(England) Adrian Whitbread	9	0	4	0	0	0	0	0	13	0	0	0
FW	(England) Steve Howard	12	3	0	0	0	0	0	0	12	3	0	0
DF	(Northern Ireland) Keith Rowland	12	2	0	0	0	0	0	0	12	2	0	0
MF	(England) Andre Scarlett	5 (4)	0	0 (1)	0	2	1	0	0	7 (5)	1	0	0
MF	(Republic of Ireland) Dean Brennan	2 (7)	0	0	0	1 (2)	0	0	0	3 (9)	0	0	0
DF	(England) Marvin Johnson	9	0	2	0	0	0	0	0	11	0	0	0
FW	(Wales) Lee Nogan	7	1	3	1	0	0	0 (1)	0	10 (1)	2	0	0
DF	(England) Jude Stirling	5 (4)	0	0 (2)	0	0	0	0	0	5 (6)	0	0	0
DF	(Norway) Kent Karlsen	4 (2)	0	2	0	0	0	1	0	7 (2)	0	0	0
FW	(England) Paul Shepherd	7	0	0	0	0	0	0	0	7	0	0	0
GK	(England) Gavin McGowan	5 (1)	0	1	0	0	0	0	0	6 (1)	0	0	0
DF	(Austria) Friedrich Breitenfelder	2 (3)	0	0	0	0	0	0	0	2 (3)	0	0	0
FW	(England) Rocky Baptiste	0 (3)	0	0	0	0	0	0	0	0 (3)	0	0	0
DF	(England) James Ayres	0	0	0	0	0	0	1	0	1	0	0	0
GK	(England) Scott Ward	0 (1)	0	0	0	0	0	0	0	0 (1)	0	0	0

== Managerial statistics ==
Only competitive games from the 2000–01 season are included.

Name	Nat.	From	To	Record								Honours
Name	Nat.	From	To	PLD	W	D	L	GF	GA	GD	W%	Honours
Ricky Hill	(England)	10 July 2000	11 November 2000	21	2	8	11	20	36	−16	9.5	–
Lil Fuccillo	(England)	16 November 2000	8 February 2001	15	4	2	9	17	28	−11	26.7	–
Joe Kinnear	(Republic of Ireland)	8 February 2001	–	20	5	7	8	25	29	−4	25.0	
Total				56	11	17	28	62	93	−31	19.6	

== Transfers ==
=== In ===
Date	Player	From	Fee	Ref.
14 July 2000	(England) Mark Stein	AFC Bournemouth	Free	
1 August 2000	(Austria) Friedrich Breitenfelder	(Austria) St. Pölten	Free	
2 August 2000	(England) Peter Holmes	Sheffield Wednesday	Free	
7 August 2000	(England) Mark Ovendale	AFC Bournemouth	£425,000	
10 August 2000	(Republic of Ireland) Dean Brennan	Sheffield Wednesday	Free	
11 September 2000	(England) Peter Thomson	(Netherlands) NAC Breda	£100,000	
24 October 2000	(England) Rocky Baptiste	Hayes	Free	
2 November 2000	(Finland) Petri Helin	(Finland) FC Jokerit	Free	
3 November 2000	(Norway) Kent Karlsen	(Norway) Vålerenga	Free	
23 November 2000	(Wales) Lee Nogan	Darlington	Free	
2 February 2001	(England) Richard Dryden	Southampton	Free	
22 March 2001	(England) Paul Shepherd	Scunthorpe United	Free	
22 March 2001	(Scotland) Steve Howard	Northampton Town	£50,000	

=== Out ===
Date	Player	To	Fee	Ref.
1 July 2000	(Scotland) Michael McIndoe	Hereford United	Free	
16 July 2000	(England) Alan White	Colchester United	Free	
17 July 2000	(Northern Ireland) Phil Gray	Burnley	Free	
24 July 2000	(Nigeria) Efe Sodje	Crewe Alexandra	Free	
24 November 2000	(England) Paul Read	Exeter City	Free	
11 January 2001	(England) James Ayres	Released		
12 February 2001	(Wales) Lee Nogan	York City	Free	
20 April 2001	(England) Nathan Abbey	Released		
20 April 2001	(England) Rocky Baptiste	Released		
20 April 2001	(Austria) Friedrich Breitenfelder	Released		
20 April 2001	(England) Gavin McGowan	Released		
20 April 2001	(England) Andre Scarlett	Released		
31 May 2001	(England) Mark Stein	Released		
31 May 2001	(England) Julian Watts	(Australia) Northern Spirit	Free	
8 June 2001	(England) Paul McLaren	Sheffield Wednesday	Free	

=== Loans in ===
Date	Player	From	End date	Ref.
25 January 2001	(Northern Ireland) Keith Rowland	Queens Park Rangers	8 May 2001	
23 November 2000	(England) Adrian Whitbread	Portsmouth	24 January 2001	

== See also ==
- List of Luton Town F.C. seasons

== Footnotes ==
A. Luton progressed into the Second Round on the away goals rule.
