= Régis Coulbault =

French footballer (born 1972)

Personal information
- Date of birth: 17 August 1972 (age 53)
- Place of birth: France
- Position: Midfielder

Senior career*
Years	Team	Apps	(Gls)
1991–1997	Toulon	94	(1)
1997–1998	Southend United	36	(4)
1998–2001	Saint-Cyr		
2001–2003	Hyères FC	60	(0)
- * Club domestic league appearances and goals

Régis Coulbault (born 17 August 1972) is a French retired footballer who mostly played as a defender. He notably played in Ligue 1 for Toulon before a spell in England with Southend United. He went on to play in Championnat National 2 with Hyères FC and in Non-League with F.C. Saint-Cyr. He retired in 2003 and now works as a manager at Regional' Golf.

== Career ==
=== Toulon ===
Coulbault is a product of the Toulon youth system. He made his first-team debut in Ligue 1 during the 1991–92 season before becoming a regular member of the Starting XI in 1993–94. In the 1995–96 season Coulbault was the starting right back on the team that reached the quarter-finals of the French Cup by eliminating a Zinedine Zidane led Bordeaux team. Coulbault was tasked with marking Zidane for large portions of the game and created the equalizing goal with a deep cross from the right to take the match to extra time where Toulon won 3–2. That same season Toulon won the Championnat National title and promotion to Ligue 2. In the final game of the season against Stade Briochin Coulbault won the game with a Golden Goal in extra time.

=== Southend United ===
After playing in several trial games in pre-season during the summer of 1997, Coulbault signed for Southend United on a one-year contract. He made his debut against Bristol City as a 56-minute substitute and scored his first goal for the club, a 40-yard strike, three games later in a 1–1 draw with Oldham Athletic. In December he scored his third goal for the club, a "Memorable" winner in extra time against Gillingham, this was followed by more late-game heroics as he slotted home a late equalizer away to Brentford on Boxing day, securing a draw after the Shrimpers had gone down to 10 men early in the second half.

=== F.C. Saint-Cyr & Hyères FC ===
Returning to France, Coulbault signed for non-league club F.C. Saint-Cyr helping them gain promotion to Régional 1 in 1999–2000 before moving to Hyères FC in Championnat National 2 for the 2001–02 season. He retired at the conclusion of the 2002–03 season.

== Honours ==
Toulon

- Championnat National: 1996

Hyères FC

- Méditerranée Régional 1: 1999
