= Jeroen Boere =

Dutch footballer (1967–2007)

- Boere playing for West Ham United

Personal information
- Full name: Jeroen Willem Boere
- Date of birth: 18 November 1967
- Place of birth: Arnhem, Netherlands
- Date of death: 16 August 2007 (aged 39)
- Place of death: Marbella, Spain
- Height: 6 ft 4 in (1.93 m)
- Position: Striker

Youth career
- VV Spirit

Senior career*
Years	Team	Apps	(Gls)
1985–1987	Excelsior	5	(0)
1987–1988	De Graafschap	35	(19)
1988–1991	FC VVV	65	(27)
1989	→ De Graafschap (loan)	21	(9)
1990	Roda JC (loan)	4	(1)
1991–1993	Go Ahead Eagles	51	(18)
1993–1995	West Ham United	25	(6)
1994	→ Portsmouth (loan)	5	(0)
1994	→ West Bromwich Albion (loan)	5	(0)
1995–1996	Crystal Palace	8	(1)
1996–1998	Southend United	73	(25)
1998–1999	Omiya Ardija	26	(18)
Total		323	(124)
- * Club domestic league appearances and goals

Jeroen Willem Boere (18 November 1967 – 16 August 2007) was a Dutch professional footballer who played as a striker. He was the younger brother of Remco Boere, who played for clubs including Den Haag and Zwolle. He played youth football at VV Spirit and started his professional career at Excelsior Rotterdam then went on to play for several teams, mostly at Holland's second level.

== Career ==
=== England ===
A tall striker, Jeroen Boere went abroad in summer 1993 when he was signed by Billy Bonds for £250,000 to play for newly promoted West Ham United in the Premier League. Jeroen, or 'Yosser' as he was known to his teammates, made his debut for West Ham on 25 September 1993 in a 2–0 defeat to Newcastle United but was sent off for a clash with Kevin Scott. Although he struggled to gain a regular place in the West Ham first team, he memorably scored twice for them in a Premier League game at Elland Road on 10 December 1994 to secure a 2–2 draw against Leeds United.

His stay with West Ham lasted two seasons and he was loaned out to Portsmouth and West Bromwich Albion. He was recalled back to West Ham because of their striker shortage when they were near the foot of the table; he formed a partnership with Tony Cottee which helped West Ham to avoid relegation that season. He eventually moved to Crystal Palace in 1995 as part of the deal that took Iain Dowie back to the Boleyn Ground. His spell at Palace was short-lived, however, and he moved on to Southend United at the end of the season.

=== Japan ===
Boere moved to Japan in 1998 to play for the newly formed professional club Omiya Ardija, formerly known as NTT Kantō, in the Japan Football League. He played 15 matches and scored 9 goals in his first season in Japan. In the 1999 season, Omiya joined the newly formed J2 League and he started the season very well, scoring 9 in 11 games. In May 1999, after dinner with his wife at a restaurant in Roppongi district of Tokyo, he was stabbed in his left eye and arm by two unknown men who reportedly appeared to be of Middle Eastern origin. His attacker was later reported to be an Israeli criminal who was later found shot through the head in a Bangkok river. Boere lost his eye in the incident, which forced his retirement from football at the age of 31.

== Later life ==
After his retirement, Boere owned the Half Moon pub in Epping High Street from 1999 until 2004.

During an interview in his pub with a Dutch sports magazine in 2001, Boere joked about his artificial eye and said he had no regrets about his career having played, at the peak of his career, for West Ham United. And, as he said, at least he was still alive. After his pub ownership ended, Boere moved to Spain, in September 2004, to work as a real estate agent.

== Death ==
Boere died on 16 August 2007 at the age of 39. There are conflicting reports about the cause of death and place of death. Some media reported that Boere died in a car crash, possibly on Ibiza, while other media reported that he was found dead in his home in Marbella. English newspaper Ilford Recorder stated that Boere had committed suicide. Boere left his wife and child as well as two sons from a previous marriage.

West Ham United, Southend United and Omiya Ardija players wore black armbands in memory of Boere in their home games in August 2007.

== Career statistics ==
Appearances and goals by club, season and competition
Club	Season	League		
Club	Season	Division	Apps	Goals
Excelsior	1985–86	Eredivisie	3	0
Excelsior	1986–87	Eredivisie	2	0
Excelsior	Total		5	0
De Graafschap	1987–88	Eerste Divisie	35	19
VVV Venlo	1988–89	Eredivisie	10	1
VVV Venlo	1989–90	Eerste Divisie	22	6
VVV Venlo	1990–91	Eerste Divisie	33	20
VVV Venlo	Total		65	27
De Graafschap (loan)	1988–89	Eerste Divisie	21	9
Roda (loan)	1989–90	Eredivisie	4	1
Go Ahead Eagles	1991–92	Eerste Divisie	23	11
Go Ahead Eagles	1992–93	Eredivisie	28	7
Go Ahead Eagles	Total		51	18
West Ham United	1993–94	Premier League	4	0
West Ham United	1994–95	Premier League	20	6
West Ham United	1995–96	Premier League	1	0
West Ham United	Total		25	6
Portsmouth (loan)	1993–94	First Division	5	0
West Bromwich Albion (loan)	1994–95	First Division	5	0
Crystal Palace	1995–96	First Division	8	1
Southend United	1995–96	First Division	6	2
Southend United	1996–97	First Division	36	9
Southend United	1997–98	Second Division	31	14
Southend United	Total		73	25
Omiya Ardija	1998	Football League	15	9
Omiya Ardija	1999	J2 League	11	9
Omiya Ardija	Total		26	18
Career total			323	124
