= Pepe N'Diaye =

Senegalese footballer

Personal information
- Full name: Sada N'Diaye
- Date of birth: 27 March 1975 (age 51)
- Place of birth: Dakar, Senegal
- Height: 5 ft 8 in (1.73 m)
- Position: Forward

Youth career
- Les Ulis

Senior career*
Years	Team	Apps	(Gls)
1996–1997	LB Châteauroux	6	(0)
1997	Troyes AC	0	(0)
1997–1998	Southend United	18	(2)
1998–1999	Grenoble Foot 38		
1999–2001	FC Gueugnon	38	(3)
2002–2003	US Créteil	6	(0)
2003–2004	FC Gueugnon	5	(0)
200?–2007	ÉDS Montluçon		
2007–	Les Ulis		
- * Club domestic league appearances and goals as of 08:05, 8 April 2009 (UTC)

Sada "Pepe" N'Diaye (born 27 March 1975) is a Senegalese footballer, who played as a forward.

N'Diaye scored on his debut in the Football League for Southend United on 18 October 1997, away at Home Park to Plymouth Argyle in the 3–2 victory. He had a trial with Tranmere Rovers in October 2001.

He returned to his first club, Les Ulis, in 2007.
