= Roger Willis =

English footballer

Personal information
- Full name: Roger Christopher Willis
- Date of birth: 17 June 1967 (age 59)
- Place of birth: Sheffield, England
- Height: 6 ft 1 in (1.85 m)
- Positions: Midfielder; forward

Senior career*
Years	Team	Apps	(Gls)
198?–1988	Dunkirk		
1988–1990	Grimsby Town	9	(0)
1990	→ Boston United (loan)	10	(5)
1990–1992	Barnet	81	(23)
1992–1993	Watford	36	(2)
1993–1994	Birmingham City	19	(5)
1994–1996	Southend United	31	(7)
1996–1997	Peterborough United	40	(6)
1997–2002	Chesterfield	135	(21)
2002	Peterborough United	4	(0)
2002	Kettering Town	2	(0)
2002	Stevenage Borough	1	(0)
2002–2003	Cambridge City	2	(0)
2003	Hucknall Town	1	(0)
2004	St Albans City	5	(2)
- * Club domestic league appearances and goals

Roger Christopher Willis (born 17 June 1967) is an English former professional footballer who played as a midfielder or forward. He made more than 300 appearances in the Football League between 1989 and 2002 playing for seven different clubs.

== Career ==
Willis, a native of Sheffield generally known by his nickname of Harry, played for Nottingham-based non-league club Dunkirk before joining Grimsby Town in 1989. He made ten first-team appearances for the Mariners in all competitions, and spent time on loan to Boston United in the Conference, before being sold to Barnet for £10,000 at the end of the 1989–90 season.

In his first season with Barnet, Willis helped them win the Conference title and consequent promotion to the Football League. A flourishing second season, in which he was one of the key players as Barnet reached the playoff semifinal, earned him a move to First Division (second-tier) club Watford in October 1992 for a fee of £175,000. After a relatively unsuccessful year with the Hornets, he rejoined former Barnet manager Barry Fry, now at fellow First Division club Birmingham City, for a fee of £150,000. Willis left for Southend United after ten months, and went on to feature for Peterborough United before settling down for a five-year spell with Third Division (fourth-tier) Chesterfield, whom he helped gain promotion in the 2000–01 season.

Released by Chesterfield in 2002, he made a brief return to Peterborough, followed by occasional appearances for non-league clubs Kettering Town, Stevenage Borough, Cambridge City and Hucknall Town, before retiring from the game in February 2003. He came out of retirement to play for St Albans City in 2004.
