= Chris Curran (footballer, born January 1971) =

English footballer

Personal information
- Full name: Christopher Patrick Curran
- Date of birth: 6 January 1971 (age 55)
- Place of birth: Heywood, England
- Position: Central defender

Senior career*
Years	Team	Apps	(Gls)
1989–1991	Crewe Alexandra	5	(0)
1991	→ Mossley (loan)		
1991–1993	Scarborough	40	(4)
1993–1994	Carlisle United	6	(1)
1994–1995	Kitchee	?	
- Rhyl
Total		51	(5)
- * Club domestic league appearances and goals

Christopher Patrick Curran (born 6 January 1971) is an English former professional footballer who played in the Football League, as a central defender.

He played for Mossley on loan in 1991, and later played for Kitchee, Rhyl and Stand Athletic.
