= Gary Porter (footballer) =

English footballer

Personal information
- Full name: Gary Michael Porter
- Date of birth: 6 March 1966 (age 60)
- Place of birth: Sunderland, England
- Height: 5 ft 5 in (1.65 m)
- Position: Midfielder

Senior career*
Years	Team	Apps	(Gls)
1984–1997	Watford	400	(47)
1997–1999	Walsall	44	(1)
1999	Scarborough	13	(0)
1999–2000	Boston United	7	(0)

International career
1983	England U17	3	(2)
1983–1984	England Youth	10	(1)
1987–1988	England U21	12	(1)
- * Club domestic league appearances and goals

Gary Michael Porter (born 6 March 1966 in Sunderland) is a former footballer who played either as a left-back or a midfielder. He spent 13 years at Watford, and also played in the Football League for Walsall and Scarborough. He was capped 12 times for England at under-21 level.

Porter spent the majority of his professional career at Watford, turning professional in 1984. He made 472 appearances for the club in all competitions – the third highest by any player for the club, behind Luther Blissett and Nigel Gibbs – scoring 51 goals, as well as being voted Player of the Season in 1993–94. He was released in 1996 following a lengthy injury.

Porter moved to Walsall and later had spells at Scarborough and Boston United. Porter now works as a football agent.
