= Julian Alsford =

English footballer

Personal information
- Full name: Julian Alsford
- Date of birth: 24 December 1972 (age 53)
- Place of birth: Poole, England
- Position: Defender

Youth career
- 1990–1991: Watford

Senior career*
Years	Team	Apps	(Gls)
1991–1994	Watford	13	(1)
1992	→ Kingsbury Town (loan)		
1992	→ Staines Town (loan)		
1994	→ Slough Town		
1994–1998	Chester City	141	(7)
1998–1999	Dundee United	3	(0)
1998	→ Barnet (loan)	9	(1)
1999	Chester City	11	(1)
1999–2000	Dorchester Town		
- * Club domestic league appearances and goals

Julian Alsford (born 24 December 1972) is an English former footballer who played the majority of his professional games with Chester City in two separate spells. He was a centre half.

Alsford started his career at Watford, after becoming an associated schoolboy in December 1988, he became a trainee in July 1989 and went on to captain the youth team. He signed professional terms in May 1991 and established himself in the reserve team. During his time with Watford, he was loaned out to Kingsbury Town and Staines Town in January 1992, and Slough Town in March 1994. However, was unable to establish himself in the Watford team, and was tried as a striker in the reserves.

Alsford was allowed to join Chester City for free in August 1994, but with Watford to receive a third of any future fee received for him. He played for Chester for four years before joining Scottish Premier League side Dundee United. He played three league games for the club before being advised by his doctor to take sick leave after his relationship with manager Tommy McLean began affecting his health. He was loaned to Barnet F.C. shortly after before rejoining Chester in 1999. In 2000, he signed to the non-league football club Dorchester Town.

Following his departure from professional football, Alsford went into the financial sector.
