= Nigel Gibbs =

English footballer (born 1965)

Personal information
- Full name: Nigel James Gibbs
- Date of birth: 20 November 1965 (age 60)
- Place of birth: St Albans, England
- Height: 5 ft 7 in (1.70 m)
- Position: Right back

Team information
- Current team: West Bromwich Albion (assistant head coach)

Youth career
- St Albans City
- Watford

Senior career*
Years	Team	Apps	(Gls)
1983–2002	Watford	407	(5)

International career
1983–1984	England Youth	6	(0)
1985	England U19	3	(0)
1987–1988	England U21	5	(0)

Managerial career
- 2005: Watford (caretaker)
- 2014: Leeds United (caretaker)
- * Club domestic league appearances and goals

Nigel James Gibbs (born 20 November 1965) is an English professional football manager and former player. He is assistant head coach at West Bromwich Albion, a role he previously held at Swansea City, has previously worked as a coach with the Under-19 squad of Tottenham Hotspur and has been assistant manager of Asteras Tripolis in Greece.

A Watford supporter, as well as a product of their youth system, Gibbs spent his entire professional career as a right back for the club. He was assistant manager of Leeds United after being appointed on 12 April 2013 alongside Brian McDermott, whom he assisted at Reading. He departed from Leeds United in August 2014.

Gibbs made his Watford debut in 1983, in front of 38,000 spectators in a UEFA Cup match against Sparta Prague. In his early career Gibbs also played nine times for the England youth team, and five times for England under-21s. Under the management of Graham Taylor, Gibbs eventually established himself as a first-team player at Watford, making 100 Football League appearances before the club's relegation from the First Division in 1988. Gibbs remained a key player for the team in the Second Division, and was voted Watford F.C. Player of the Season in 1992.

Manager Glenn Roeder appointed Gibbs as club captain for the 1992–93 season, but a series of serious injuries restricted him to 33 appearances over the following four seasons. When his contract expired in 1996, Gibbs considered retirement, but he went on to earn a new contract and make the most appearances of any Watford player in 1996–97. Gibbs featured regularly in Watford's rise from the Second Division (Note: The First Division broke away from the Football League in 1992 to form the Premier League. Consequently, the Second Division was renamed as the First Division.) to the Premier League between 1997 and 1999, and went on to play a further 17 games at the top level of English football. Watford were relegated in 2000, and Gibbs made eight further appearances before retiring in 2002.

Gibbs remained at Watford as a coach, primarily working with the youth and reserve teams. He took charge of the first team for a week following Ray Lewington's sacking as manager in 2005, but in turn was dismissed by incoming manager Aidy Boothroyd just before the start of the following season. After taking a year off to acquire the UEFA Pro Licence, Gibbs joined Reading as youth team manager in 2006, and became assistant manager in 2009–10. He continued in this role, and in 2011–12 Reading won the Football League Championship title, earning promotion to the Premier League.

== Early life ==
Born in the city of St Albans, Hertfordshire, Gibbs attended How Wood primary school, and as a nine-year-old striker helped his team win a district six-a-side competition. Gibbs began training with and supporting Watford from an early age, and was watching from the Main Stand at Vicarage Road as Watford sealed the Fourth Division title in 1978. Although part of Watford's youth system, he occasionally played for St Albans City's youth team due to their close proximity to his home and school. He also played for Hertfordshire schools at under-14 to under-16 levels.

Although initially a striker, Gibbs switched to the position of right-back as a teenager. Further success came with Watford's youth teams; he played in the first leg of the youth team's 7–6 aggregate FA Youth Cup win against Manchester United in 1982, and in the final as Watford finished runners up in the Southern Junior Floodlit Cup. These performances earned him a callup to England's youth team, for whom he played nine times. However, after signing as an apprentice in July 1982, Gibbs played in midfield for the reserves. Due to his height, first team manager Graham Taylor was concerned about Gibbs' ability to cope with the physicality of being a first-team full back, and placed 17-year-old Gibbs on a steak and Guinness diet as an attempt to "beef him up."

== Professional career ==
=== Turning professional in the First Division ===
Gibbs turned professional on 20 November 1983. Three days later, he made his Watford debut in a UEFA Cup third round home match against Sparta Prague at the club's stadium, Vicarage Road. He also played in the away fixture, in front of 38,000 spectators. Faced with snowy conditions in Prague, Watford were eliminated 7–2 on aggregate. Gibbs made his first Football League appearances in Watford's final three First Division games of 1983–84, including as a substitute in a 2–1 win over Arsenal. However, he was not selected for the 1984 FA Cup final.

Gibbs, now 18, returned to the reserves for much of the following season. Watford's first-team struggled, failing to win any of their first nine league games. Although his first start of the season ended in a 2–0 defeat to Queens Park Rangers, Gibbs retained his place for 10 of the remaining 11 matches, experiencing only one further defeat. Continuing in this vein, 1985–86 saw Gibbs establish himself as the team's first choice right-back. He missed only two games all season, both of which resulted in defeat for Watford. His first goal came on 5 April 1986 in a 4–1 home victory over Newcastle United, while he also played in a 5–1 win over Chelsea at Stamford Bridge on the final day of the season. Gibbs' consistency helped him to third place in the voting for the club's Player of the Season award.

After suffering a foot injury at the start of 1986–87, Gibbs was restricted to 18 appearances as his team finished the season 9th in the First Division. However, the departure of Graham Taylor and arrival of Dave Bassett the following season signalled a decline in the club's fortunes. Gibbs lost his place shortly before Bassett's departure in January, and although he soon returned to the side under Steve Harrison, Watford were relegated in 1988. At the time of the club's relegation, Gibbs had made precisely 100 First Division appearances.

=== Second Division ===
"He is simply a manager's dream. He is consistent, enthusiastic, honest and plays over 35 games a year."

— Steve Harrison on Gibbs

Despite the disappointment of relegation, Gibbs started 1988–89 strongly. The defender played every minute of Watford's four opening fixtures, with the team keeping four consecutive clean sheets. During this run, he also scored the only goal of the game against West Bromwich Albion at The Hawthorns. Playing in all 46 league games, Gibbs finished second in the Player of the Season vote behind Glyn Hodges. Watford finished the season in a play-off position, behind Chelsea, Manchester City and Crystal Palace. The team faced Blackburn Rovers in the semi-finals, drawing both games but being eliminated on the away goals rule. The following season saw Watford slip down to 15th, although they did keep 11 clean sheets in the 41 games that Gibbs played in. Gibbs briefly lost his place in the team following Harrison being replaced by Colin Lee, but regained it before the end of the campaign.

An injury sustained on 25 August 1990 kept Gibbs out for two months, and once he had regained full fitness, his team were bottom of the table. His return coincided with a winless run of seven league matches, leaving Watford seven points from safety with nearly half the season gone. Nonetheless, Watford managed to climb to 20th place, and despite missing 14 games, Gibbs was once again shortlisted for the club's end of season award. In 1991–92 Gibbs finally became Player of the Season. Missing only three matches, he rounded off a good season by scoring his first goal in four years in Watford's last league game, cementing a top-ten finish in the Second Division.

=== Career threatening injury ===
Gibbs was appointed club captain at the start of the 1992–93 season. The team started the season with three First Division defeats in their opening six games, keeping just one clean sheet. However, on an individual level the season was to get even worse for Gibbs. He sustained a knee injury against Notts County on 7 September 1992, putting him out of first team contention for six weeks. During his comeback, at home to Tranmere Rovers, Gibbs aggravated the previous injury, putting him out of action for more than two years. Concern over the injury, coupled with the good form of Gerard Lavin, restricted Gibbs' opportunities under Glenn Roeder in 1994–95.

After making only nine appearances during Watford's 1995–96 relegation season, general manager Graham Taylor released him upon the expiry of his contract, over injury concerns. Gibbs considered retirement.

=== Comeback and return to the top division ===
Despite receiving enquiries from other clubs, he stayed at Vicarage Road for pre-season, in the hope of regaining his match fitness. After proving that he had recovered, Gibbs was offered a short-term contract at the club, which was eventually extended. Newly relegated Watford finished 13th of 24 teams in 1996–97. They conceded 38 goals in 46 league matches, the joint-best defensive record in the division. Gibbs missed just one of the club's 57 fixtures, scoring in a game against Brentford. The defender later noted the irony that having been released as an injury concern, he ended up playing more games the following season than any of his teammates.

Kenny Jackett stood down as manager following Watford's disappointing season, becoming assistant to Graham Taylor. The effect was immediate; Watford won six of their first seven league games, eventually becoming 1997–98 Second Division champions and earning promotion. Gibbs played part of the season at left-back due to an injury to Paul Robinson, although in turn Gibbs also missed games to injury. He started the 1998–99 season as a first-team regular, but sustained an injury in a game against Bolton on 20 October 1998, and only made two further appearances. Nonetheless, Watford secured promotion via the playoffs in Gibbs' absence, and when Watford won the play-off final to secure promotion, Gibbs was the first person to celebrate the win with Taylor.

=== Later years and retirement ===
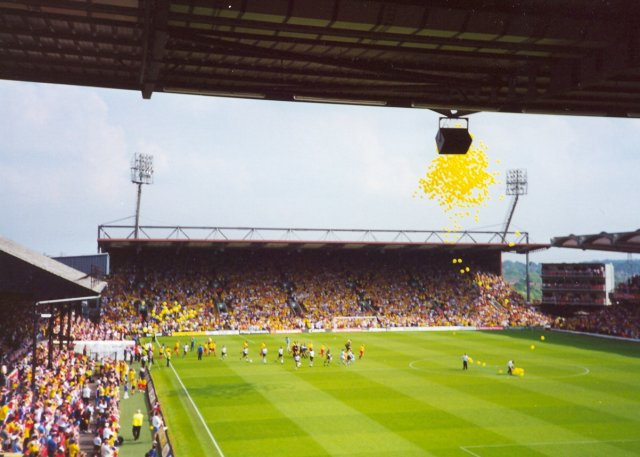
Gibbs played in Watford's 1–0 Premier League win over Coventry City on 14 May 2000.

When fit, Gibbs had been Watford's first choice right-back since 1985, with the exception of 1994–95, where Gerard Lavin's form kept a recovering Gibbs in the reserves. A combination of Gibbs' age, and a desire to acquire more strength in depth for the Premier League, prompted Taylor to sign right-backs Des Lyttle and Neil Cox in 1999. Despite the competition, Gibbs managed to make 20 appearances in 1999–2000, and his Premier League experience included victories over Chelsea, Coventry City and Southampton, although these were not enough to prevent relegation back to the First Division. By now in his mid thirties, first team opportunities became scarce for Gibbs in 2000–01. He made only seven first team appearances, although Watford managed to avoid defeat in six of those. His final appearance, and only game under Gianluca Vialli, came on 24 April 2002. An 82nd-minute substitute, Gibbs was unable to prevent a late Gillingham goal, which secured them a 3–2 victory. Among Gillingham's players for Gibbs' professional swansong was Andy Hessenthaler, the man who became Watford captain after Gibbs' injury. Gibbs retired as Watford's second highest all-time appearance maker, although he started more matches than Luther Blissett, the man ahead of him.

== Style of play ==
"...in my early days I had Cally (Nigel Callaghan) in front of me, who was probably the best right winger in the country at the time. He spent the games just putting in crosses for fun; why did anyone want me to cross the ball?!?"

— Gibbs on his perceived reluctance to attack.

Considerably shorter than the average footballer at 5 ft 7in, Gibbs made up for his physical disadvantage with positional play, determination, accurate tackling, and staying on his feet. Although a defender, his lack of goals (7 in 491 appearances) and reluctance to get forward were often remarked upon. Gibbs refuted the suggestion that he didn't attack enough, while former managers Roeder and Taylor both considered Gibbs to be an excellent crosser of the ball when he did venture forward. He scored his first professional goal during his 59th game. By comparison, Gibbs' long-term successor at right-back, Lloyd Doyley, scored his first professional goal on his 269th appearance.

== Managerial career ==
After retiring, Gibbs served Watford as a coach for three years, initially working with the reserve and youth teams, and later as an assistant manager. During this period he oversaw the development of players such as Ashley Young, Lloyd Doyley and Hamer Bouazza, and helped Watford to a Premier Reserve League win in 2002–03. Following Ray Lewington's sacking in March 2005, Gibbs briefly managed Watford on a caretaker basis, although his reign did not include a single game. Following the appointment of Aidy Boothroyd, Gibbs left Watford in July. Having had a formal connection with the club since the 1970s, he felt that his departure had been "very poorly handled". In 2006, Gibbs received his UEFA Pro Licence, which means he can manage any football club in England on a full-time basis. At the beginning of the 2006–07 season, Gibbs joined the management team at Reading, where his initial responsibility was working with the younger players at the club. Further Premier Reserve League success followed in 2007, and Gibbs was promoted to the role of assistant manager in 2009–10. On the penultimate game of the season, Reading faced Watford at Vicarage Road. A Reading victory would have put their opponents in danger of relegation, but Watford emerged 3–0 winners to seal their Championship survival. Gibbs remained at Reading under the management of Brian McDermott, and in 2011–12 the team won the Football League Championship, earning promotion to the Premier League. He left Reading on 11 March 2013 following McDermott's departure as manager.

Following the departure of Neil Warnock in April 2013, Brian McDermott took over as manager of Leeds United on 12 April 2013 on a 3-year contract, with Nigel Gibbs joining him at the club as Assistant Manager.

On 1 February 2014, after the dismissal of Brian McDermott, Gibbs took charge of Leeds United as caretaker manager in the 5–1 win over local rivals Huddersfield Town.

On 15 December 2014, Gibbs was appointed first-team coach at Millwall. He then became the Under-19s coach at Tottenham Hotspur in the 2016–17 season.

He later became an assistant to Paul Clement at Swansea City, but left the club in December 2017 following the sacking of Clement. He worked in Reading as an assistant manager, before he left in late 2018 with the arrival of new manager José Manuel Gomes. In July 2019, Gibbs returned to Tottenham Hotspur and was appointed Assistant Head of Player Development for Under-17 to Under-23.

In the latter half of February 2021, Nigel Gibbs was brought in to Portsmouth to assist Portsmouth assistant Joe Gallen during the temporary absence of manager Kenny Jackett.

On 20 April 2021, Gibbs was confirmed as interim head coach at Tottenham Hotspur alongside Chris Powell, following the appointment of Ryan Mason as interim manager. On 25 April 2023, Gibbs was appointed acting first team coach at Tottenham following several dismissals from the coaching staff. He left Tottenham in September 2024 to become assistant manager of Asteras Tripolis in Greece under Claude Makelele with whom he had worked at Swansea City.

On 13 December 2024, Gibbs was confirmed as having joined the first team coaching setup at Reading under Noel Hunt as Assistant Manager.

In June 2025, Gibbs was appointed assistant head coach at West Bromwich Albion, supporting the newly appointed Ryan Mason.

== Personal life ==
Gibbs was born into a football family. His father Dennis had played for Hitchin Town, Hemel Hempstead Town and St Albans City, while father-in-law Alan helped form the youth team Nascot Wood Rangers. Growing up supporting Manchester United, Gibbs is related to supporters of both Watford and Luton Town, despite the rivalry between the two. He maintains a connection with his former club, regularly attending club events and occasionally playing for their masters football team.

Among others, Gibbs remains close friends with former teammates Luther Blissett and Kenny Jackett, both of whom coached him after ending their playing careers. Owing to his long association with the club, he is also a friend of Elton John, and once filled in as a backup singer for John on a Watford tour of China. During the "Let's buy back the Vic" fundraising show at Vicarage Road in 2005, John dedicated his performance of Electricity to Gibbs' wedding anniversary.

== Career statistics ==
Key

^{1st}	Voted Player of the Season
^{2nd}	Came 2nd in Player of the Season vote
^{3rd}	Came 3rd in Player of the Season vote

- Apps: Appearances
- Goals: Goals scored
- Notes: Explains which competition "Other" appearances refer to.

Nigel Gibbs' club career statistics (Note: All games were played for Watford.)
Season	Division	League		FA Cup		League Cup		Other		Total		Notes
Season	Division	Apps	Goals	Apps	Goals	Apps	Goals	Apps	Goals	Apps	Goals	Notes
1983–84	First Division	3	0	0	0	0	0	2	0	5	0	(Note: Includes two appearances in the 1983–84 UEFA Cup.)
1984–85	First Division	12	0	0	0	0	0	0	0	12	0	—
1985–86^{3rd}	First Division	40	1	8	0	3	0	0	0	51	1	—
1986–87	First Division	15	0	3	0	0	0	0	0	18	0	—
1987–88	First Division	30	0	4	0	5	2	1	0	40	2	(Note: Includes one appearance in the Full Members Cup.)
1988–89^{2nd}	Second Division	46	1	6	0	1	0	6	0	59	1	(Note: Includes four appearances in the Full Members Cup, and two in the Football League First Division play-offs.)
1989–90	Second Division	41	0	3	0	2	0	1	0	47	0	(Note: Includes one appearance in the Full Members Cup.)
1990–91^{3rd}	Second Division	34	0	1	0	0	0	1	0	36	0	(Note: Includes one appearance in the Full Members Cup.)
1991–92^{1st}	Second Division	43	1	1	0	4	0	1	0	49	1	(Note: Includes one appearance in the Full Members Cup.)
1992–93	First Division	7	0	0	0	0	0	1	0	8	0	(Note: Includes one appearance in the Anglo-Italian Cup.)
1993–94	First Division	0	0	0	0	0	0	0	0	0	0	—
1994–95	First Division	11	0	5	0	0	0	0	0	16	0	—
1995–96	First Division	9	0	0	0	0	0	0	0	9	0	—
1996–97^{3rd}	Second Division	45	1	4	0	4	0	3	0	56	1	(Note: Includes three appearances in the Associate Members Cup.)
1997–98	Second Division	38	1	5	0	3	0	0	0	46	1	—
1998–99	First Division	10	0	0	0	0	0	1	0	11	0	(Note: Includes one appearance in the Football League Championship play-offs.)
1999–2000	Premier League	17	0	1	0	2	0	0	0	20	0	—
2000–01	First Division	6	0	0	0	1	0	0	0	7	0	—
2001–02	First Division	1	0	0	0	0	0	0	0	1	0	—
Career total		408	5	41	0	25	2	17	0	491	7	(Note: In total, Gibbs made eight appearances in the Full Members Cup, three in the Associate Members Cup, two in the UEFA Cup, two in the 1989 Football League First Division play-offs, and one in each of the Anglo-Italian Cup and the 1999 Football League Championship play-offs.) (Note: There is inconsistency between sources as to in which competitions Gibbs made his 491 appearances. Soccerbase credits him with 407 league games, 41 FA Cup games, 25 League Cup games, and 18 appearances in other competitions. The Golden Boys: A Study of Watford's Cult Heroes (which does not take into account Gibbs' solitary league appearance in 2001–02) credits him with 410 league appearances, although this includes his 3 play-off appearances. It also credits him with 41 FA Cup matches and 39 matches in "other" competitions, including the League Cup. The latter source is used, as 408 league matches is consistent with the breakdown of Gibbs' individual appearances found in Watford Season by Season from 1983 to 1998, and on Soccerbase from 1996 to 2002.)

== Honours ==
Watford Youth

- FA Youth Cup: 1981–82

Watford

- Football League Second Division: 1997–98

Individual

- Watford Player of the Season: 1991–92
- Watford F.C. Hall of Fame inductee: 2010
