= Jason Soloman =

English footballer

Personal information
- Full name: Jason Rafael Soloman
- Date of birth: 6 October 1970 (age 56)
- Place of birth: Welwyn Garden City, England
- Height: 6 ft 0 in (1.83 m)
- Position: Defender

Youth career
- –1988: Watford

Senior career*
Years	Team	Apps	(Gls)
1990–1995	Watford	100	(5)
1995	→ Peterborough United (loan)	4	(0)
1995–1996	Wycombe Wanderers	13	(1)
1996	Wrexham	2	(0)
1996–1997	Fulham	4	(0)
1997–1998	Stevenage Borough	38	(4)
2002–2004	Barnet	21	(2)
Total		182	(12)
- * Club domestic league appearances and goals

Jason Rafael Soloman (born 6 October 1970) is an English retired professional footballer who played as a defender. Soloman made over 100 league appearances for a number of clubs between 1990 and 1997, before playing non-league football.

== Career ==
Born in Welwyn Garden City, Soloman began his career with the youth team of Watford. He also played league football for Peterborough United, Wycombe Wanderers, Wrexham and Fulham. He later played non-league football for Stevenage Borough and Barnet.
