= Paul Furlong =

English footballer & coach (born 1968)

Personal information
- Full name: Paul Anthony Furlong
- Date of birth: 1 October 1968 (age 58)
- Place of birth: Wood Green, London, England
- Height: 6 ft 1 in (1.85 m)
- Position: Striker

Senior career*
Years	Team	Apps	(Gls)
1986–1991	Enfield	101	(34)
1991–1992	Coventry City	37	(4)
1992–1994	Watford	79	(37)
1994–1996	Chelsea	65	(13)
1996–2002	Birmingham City	131	(50)
2000	→ Queens Park Rangers (loan)	3	(1)
2002	→ Sheffield United (loan)	4	(2)
2002	→ Queens Park Rangers (loan)	6	(2)
2002–2007	Queens Park Rangers	162	(54)
2007–2008	Luton Town	32	(8)
2008–2009	Southend United	3	(0)
2009	→ Barnet (loan)	21	(9)
2009–2010	Barnet	38	(5)
2010–2011	Kettering Town	27	(5)
2011–2012	St Albans City	22	(6)
Total		732	(230)

International career
1990–1991	England Semi-Pro	6	(1)

Managerial career
- 2021–2025: Queens Park Rangers U23
- * Club domestic league appearances and goals

Paul Anthony Furlong (born 1 October 1968) is an English football coach and former professional player who played as a striker. He is a coach of Watford FC's U23 team.

Furlong played in the top division of English football for Coventry City and Chelsea and in the Football league for Watford, Birmingham City, Queens Park Rangers, Sheffield United, Luton Town, Southend United and Barnet. He has also played Non-League football for Enfield, Kettering Town and St Albans City, where he was player-coach. At representative level, he has six caps for the England semi-professional team.

== Playing career ==
=== Coventry City ===
He began his career at non-League level with Conference side Enfield in 1986, remaining there until July 1991 when he signed for Football League First Division side Coventry City. He was brought to Highfield Road by the club's player-manager and former England defender Terry Butcher, and when Butcher was sacked in January he remained in favour under new manager Don Howe. Furlong only managed four goals from 37 league games all season, however, and after the season ended he was transferred to Watford.

=== Watford ===
Furlong was much more successful at Watford in Division One (the new name for the original Second Division after the creation of the Premier League), and was voted Watford Player of the Season in 1993. Although he failed to inspire Watford to a promotion challenge, he established himself as one of the finest strikers in the division at this time, alongside the likes of Steve Bull and Stan Collymore.

=== Chelsea ===
At the end of the 1993–94 season, he became Chelsea's record signing in a £2.3 million deal, and that season he helped them reach the UEFA Cup Winners' Cup semi-finals (losing to Real Zaragoza by a single goal) as well as finish 11th in the Premier League. However, the arrival of Ruud Gullit and Mark Hughes during the 1995 close season reduced his first team opportunities, and following the arrival of Gianluca Vialli a year later he opted to move on. During his time at Chelsea he scored 18 goals in 85 matches in all competitions.

=== Birmingham City ===
He became Birmingham City's record signing in a £1.5 million deal. Although it meant dropping down a division, Furlong knew he would have more chances of first team action in the West Midlands, and was part of an ambitious side managed by Trevor Francis and containing fellow big names including Steve Bruce, Mike Newell and Gary Ablett. He remained at St Andrew's for six years, scoring 50 goals in 130 Division One games, and having loan spells at Queens Park Rangers (twice) and Sheffield United.

=== Queens Park Rangers ===
He finally left Birmingham in the summer of 2002, the year they reached the Premier League after 16 years outside the top flight, and signed a contract with Queens Park Rangers in Division Two. This was a return to a previous club as Furlong had been a youth team player at QPR at the start of his career. He continued to do well at Loftus Road, helping them win promotion in 2004, and by the time he left in 2007, he had played 162 league games and scored 54 goals.

=== Luton Town ===
On leaving QPR, the 38-year-old Furlong signed for Luton Town who had just been relegated from the Football League Championship. He scored eight goals in 32 games but was unable to prevent the financially troubled side from suffering a second successive relegation.

=== Southend United ===
He then signed for League One side Southend United, but made just four appearances during the first half of the season and was loaned out to Barnet in January 2009. After two goals in January the loan spell was extended until the end of the season. His goal in Barnet's 1–0 win against AFC Bournemouth was his 200th senior goal, and he marked the occasion by laying down his shirt and saluting it.

=== Barnet ===
He was released by Southend at the end of the 2008–09 season, and joined Barnet on a one-year deal after an excellent pre-season. This was subsequently extended until the end of the 2009–10 season. On 2 June 2010, Furlong was released by Barnet.

=== Kettering Town ===
A few weeks later, he joined Conference National club Kettering Town as player-coach. During the 2010–11 season with Kettering, Furlong scored 5 times in 27 appearances for the club – including a brace in a match against Eastbourne Borough on 22 January 2011 – as they finished 15th in the Conference Premier.

=== St Albans City ===
On 10 August 2011, Furlong was confirmed as player/coach at St Albans City. He scored on his debut for St Albans in a Southern League Premier Division game against Cirencester Town.

== International career ==
When at Enfield he was capped six times for the England semi-professional team, scoring once. He was also eligible to play for Montserrat.

== Coaching career ==
Having already been on Queens Park Rangers' staff part-time, in September 2012 Furlong was appointed assistant youth development coach within the club's academy to work with the players aged 12 to 16. He went on to manage the under-18 team, and in September 2021 became under-23s manager jointly with Andy Impey. He departed the club in November 2025.. In April 2026 it was announced that Paul Furlong had returned to former club Watford FC as a full time coach for the Under 21 team joining a raft of ex-Watford players working at the club in academy roles.

== Personal life ==
Furlong's son Darnell, who plays as a full back, made his professional debut with Queens Park Rangers in 2015.
