= Alex Inglethorpe =

English football player and manager (born 1971)

Personal information
- Full name: Alexander Matthew Inglethorpe
- Date of birth: 14 November 1971 (age 54)
- Place of birth: Epsom, England
- Height: 5 ft 11 in (1.80 m)
- Position: Forward

Team information
- Current team: Liverpool (Director of the Academy)

Senior career*
| Years | Team | Apps | (Gls) |
| 1990–1995 | Watford | 12 | (2) |
| 1995 | → Barnet (loan) | 6 | (3) |
| 1995–2000 | Leyton Orient | 123 | (32) |
| 2000–2001 | Exeter City | 19 | (2) |
| 2000–2001 | → Canvey Island (loan) | 0 | (0) |
| 2001–2003 | Leatherhead | | |
| Total | | 160 | (39) |

Managerial career
- 2001–2003: Leatherhead
- 2004–2006: Exeter City
- * Club domestic league appearances and goals

Alexander Matthew Inglethorpe (born 14 November 1971) is an English former footballer who played as a forward for Watford, Leyton Orient, Exeter City and Barnet. He is now the Academy Director at Liverpool FC.

== Playing career ==
Born in Epsom, England, Inglethorpe attended Howard of Effingham School in Surrey before beginning his playing career at Watford. Despite staying at the club for five years, he made only two starts and ten substitute appearances in league matches. Following a loan spell at Barnet in 1995, he signed for Leyton Orient. In 2000, he moved to Exeter City, where he ended his professional career following a brief loan spell at Canvey Island, for whom he played only a single match in the FA Cup.

== Coaching career ==
Inglethorpe started his coaching career at Leatherhead in a player-manager role. While at Leatherhead he had to manage the team on a budget of just £500 a week. In his interview to James Pearce of the Chester Chronicle he included "While I was there, I worked in a warehouse and I coached the Under-18s at Lewisham College. I had 70 to 80 youngsters and a bag of balls and had to make the most of it. It was hard but they were good times."

Inglethorpe returned to Leyton Orient as U-19 coach in January 2004. He was appointed manager of Exeter in October 2004. During his tenure at Exeter the club drew 0–0 with Manchester United in the FA Cup. Whilst managing in non-League he also served as Assistant Manager of the England National Game XI, but left the post in October 2005 as he was unhappy with claims he used the post to tap up other clubs' players.

In June 2006 he left Exeter to join the coaching staff at Tottenham, having also been offered the manager's job at MK Dons. Following the sacking of Martin Jol, he served as assistant to caretaker manager Clive Allen until the appointment of Juande Ramos. After Ramos was sacked, Inglethorpe was due to take charge of the Tottenham team for a league match against Bolton, though this was prevented by the quick appointment of Harry Redknapp.

In November 2012 he left Tottenham after six years to join Brendan Rodgers' backroom staff at Liverpool as a reserve team coach. In August 2014 Inglethorpe was promoted from the under-21s manager to academy director at Liverpool.
