= Keith Dublin =

English professional footballer (born 1966)

Personal information
- Date of birth: 29 January 1966 (age 60)
- Place of birth: High Wycombe, England
- Height: 5 ft 11 in (1.80 m)
- Position: Left back

Youth career
- Chelsea

Senior career*
Years	Team	Apps	(Gls)
1983–1987	Chelsea	51	(0)
1987–1990	Brighton & Hove Albion	132	(5)
1990–1994	Watford	168	(2)
1994–1999	Southend United	179	(9)
1998	Colchester United	2	(0)
1999–2002	Farnborough Town		
2002	→ Carshalton Athletic (loan)	10	(0)
2002–2003	Carshalton Athletic	44	(5)

International career
1985	England U19	4	(0)
- * Club domestic league appearances and goals

Keith Dublin (born 29 January 1966) is an English former footballer who played at left-back for Chelsea, Brighton & Hove Albion, Watford, Southend United and Colchester United in the Football League.

== Career ==
Born in High Wycombe, Dublin began his career with Chelsea, one of the first black footballers to play for the club. Dublin came to Chelsea as an apprentice in July 1982, signed professional in October 1983, and made his debut for the Chelsea first team in May 1984 against Barnsley in the Second Division Championship side managed by John Neal. Despite being voted Chelsea's young player of the year in 1983, he struggled to hold down a place in the first team and when left-sided players Tony Dorigo and Clive Wilson were signed in 1987 under John Hollins, he was moved to Brighton & Hove Albion for £35,000 after 28 League appearances.

He was a member of the Brighton side which won promotion to the old Second Division, before enjoying spells with Watford, Southend United, Colchester United, and in non-League football with Farnborough Town and Carshalton Athletic.

== Honours ==
=== Club ===
Brighton & Hove Albion

- Football League Third Division runner-up: 1987–88

Individual

- PFA Team of the Year: 1987–88 Third Division
