= Gerard Lavin =

Footballer (born 1974)

Personal information
- Date of birth: 5 February 1974 (age 52)
- Place of birth: Corby, Northamptonshire, England
- Position: Right-back

Youth career
- 1988–1992: Watford

Senior career*
Years	Team	Apps	(Gls)
1992–1995	Watford	149	(3)
1995–1999	Millwall	87	(0)
1999–2001	Bristol City	22	(0)
2001	→ Wycombe Wanderers (loan)	4	(0)
2001–2003	Northampton Town	5	(0)
2003–2004	Farnborough	1	(0)
Total		267	(3)

International career
1993–1994	Scotland under-21	7	(1)
- * Club domestic league appearances and goals

Gerard Lavin (born 5 February 1974) is a former footballer who played as a right-back. He played in the English Football League for Watford, Millwall, Bristol City, Wycombe Wanderers and Northampton Town, before finishing his playing career at Southern League side Farnborough. Born in England, he also played for the Scotland U21 national team.

== Career ==
Born in the English town of Corby to Scottish parents, Lavin started his career as a schoolboy at Watford. He became an apprentice at the club upon leaving school, and signed professionally in May 1992. Over the next three years Lavin made 149 first team appearances, most of them at right back in place of injured club captain Nigel Gibbs. Lavin scored three goals during his time at Watford, including one after 13 seconds in a match against future club Millwall.

After Watford finished 7th in the First Division in 1994–95, Lavin was sold to Millwall for £750,000. Watford were relegated the following season. At Millwall Lavin made 97 appearances over four years, scoring once in the Football League Trophy against Brighton, before being leaving on a Bosman free transfer in 1999, and joining Bristol City. He made his début for City on 7 August 1999 against Reading, but was sent off for deliberately kicking the ball at Reading fans. The ball broke a Reading fan's wrist, and Lavin was later convicted of assault.

Lavin made a further 22 appearances for Bristol in 1999–2000, but struggled to make the first team the following season. He was loaned to Wycombe Wanderers, and in May 2001 joined Northampton Town. He played three times in the first team before breaking his leg against QPR. Over the next two seasons he struggled to recover from the leg break and was forced to retire at the age of 30.

== Honours ==
Millwall

- Football League Trophy runner-up: 1998–99
