= Jason Drysdale =

English footballer (born 1970)

Personal information
- Full name: Jason Drysdale
- Date of birth: 17 November 1970 (age 55)
- Place of birth: Bristol, England
- Position: Left-back

Senior career*
Years	Team	Apps	(Gls)
1988–1994	Watford	145	(11)
1994–1995	Newcastle United	0	(0)
1995–1998	Swindon Town	43	(0)
1998	Northampton Town	1	(0)
1998–2001	Forest Green Rovers	92	(5)
2001	Aberystwyth Town		
2001–2003	Bath City		
- Mangotsfield United F.C.
- Paulton Rovers F.C.
- * Club domestic league appearances and goals

Jason Drysdale (born 17 November 1970 in Bristol) is an English former footballer.

Drysale began his career with Watford where he made over 100 appearances in a six-year period before joining Newcastle United. He then signed for Swindon Town before a short spell with Northampton Town.

Drysdale then moved into non-league football and signed for Forest Green Rovers. He was a part of the Forest Green side which reached the 2001 FA Trophy final but lost 1–0 to Canvey Island at Villa Park. He played for three years with Forest Green before following departed manager, Frank Gregan, by signing for Welsh Premier League side Aberystwyth Town.

Drysale returned to England shortly after and signed for Bath City before ending his career with Mangotsfield United and Paulton Rovers.

== Honours ==
Swindon Town

- Football League Second Division: 1995–96
