= 1998–99 Luton Town F.C. season =

English football club season

Luton Town
1998–99 season
- Chairman: David Kohler
- Manager: Lennie Lawrence
- Stadium: Kenilworth Road
- Second Division: 12th
- FA Cup: Second round
- League Cup: Quarter-finals
- Football League Trophy: Southern Second Round
- Top goalscorer: League: Stuart Douglas (9); All: Phil Gray (13)
- Highest home attendance: 9,070 (vs. Manchester City, Second Division, 28 November 1998)
- Lowest home attendance: 1,870 (vs. Walsall, Football League Trophy, 05 January 1999)
- Average home league attendance: 5,527

The 1998–99 season was the 113th season in the history of Luton Town F.C. It was Luton Town's 78th consecutive season in the Football League, and their 81st overall. It was their third consecutive season in the Football League Third Division.

== Season summary ==
During the 1998–99 English football season, Luton Town F.C. competed in the Football League Second Division. Having finished strongly to narrowly avoid relegation in the previous season Luton Town carried their good form into the start of the 1999 season. Their bright start to the season saw them competing for a playoff spot as well as progressing to the quarter-final of the League Cup. However their defeat to Sunderland in the League Cup coincided with a run of only 1 win in 12 league games which saw Luton Town drop out of playoff contention.

Luton Town's season took a turn for the worse in February. Even though they suffered 7 defeats in 8 league games, the club's situation off the pitch was even more dire. Luton's long-running plan for a multi-purpose 'Kohlerdome' stadium, to be named after chairman David Kohler, was finally rejected by the Department of the Environment. As a result, David Kohler announced on 19 February that he would be resigning as chairman of the club. Kohler spent the next month trying to sell the club. But having failed to agree a price with fellow directors, including Cliff Bassett, for his share of the club, Kohler and the board decided there was no option but to appoint receivers. Buchler Phillips were appointed and Luton Town went into receivership on 20 March.

Tony Thorpe's late-season loan performance mirrored Rory Allen's impact in 1998. Thorpe scored four goals in the final four matches, helping Luton earn nine points and securing the clubs place in the league for another season.

== Final league table ==
Pos	Team	Pld	W	D	L	GF	GA	GD	Pts
10	Millwall	46	17	11	18	52	59	−7	62
11	Reading	46	16	13	17	54	63	−9	61
12	Luton Town	46	16	10	20	51	60	−9	58
13	Bristol Rovers	46	13	17	16	65	56	+9	56
14	Blackpool	46	14	14	18	44	54	−10	56

Rules for classification: 1) Points; 2) Goals scored; 3) Goal difference

== Results ==
Luton Town's score comes first

=== Legend ===
Win	Draw	Loss

=== Football League Second Division ===
Date	Opponent	Venue	Result	Attendance	Scorers
08 August 1998	Wycombe Wanderers	Away	1–0	5,252	Steve Davis
15 August 1998	Preston North End	Home	1–1	5,392	Dwight Marshall
22 August 1998	Reading	Away	0–3	18,108	
29 August 1998	Colchester United	Home	2–0	5,005	Stuart Douglas, Steve Davis
31 August 1998	Wigan Athletic	Away	3–1	3,778	Steve Davis, Sean Evers, Phil Gray
05 September 1998	Burnley	Home	1–0	5,554	Stuart Douglas
08 September 1998	Wrexham	Away	1–1	2,951	Ray McKinnon
12 September 1998	Bristol Rovers	Home	2–0	5,558	Steve Davis, Graham Alexander
19 September 1998	Blackpool	Away	0–1	5,695	
26 September 1998	Walsall	Home	0–1	5,530	
03 October 1998	Fulham	Away	3–1	11,856	Phil Gray, Stuart Douglas, Steve Davis
10 October 1998	York City	Away	3–3	3,780	Stuart Douglas, Sean Evers, Phil Gray
17 October 1998	Oldham Athletic	Home	2–0	5,447	Phil Gray, Andre Scarlett
20 October 1998	Northampton Town	Home	1–0	6,087	Graham Alexander
24 October 1998	Gillingham	Away	0–1	5,602	
07 November 1998	Stoke City	Away	1–3	12,964	Stuart Douglas
21 November 1998	Lincoln City	Away	2–2	4,893	Phil Gray, Gary Doherty
28 November 1998	Manchester City	Home	1–1	9,070	Gary Doherty
12 December 1998	Macclesfield Town	Away	2–2	2,905	Stuart Douglas, Phil Gray
19 December 1998	Millwall	Home	1–2	5,939	Steve Davis
28 December 1998	AFC Bournemouth	Away	0–1	8,863	
02 January 1999	Colchester United	Away	2–2	4,694	Graham Alexander, Alan White
09 January 1999	Wycombe Wanderers	Home	3–1	5,063	Matthew Spring, Sean Evers, Stuart Douglas
16 January 1999	Preston North End	Away	1–2	11,034	Andrew Fotiadis
23 January 1999	Wigan Athletic	Home	0–4	4,934	
30 January 1999	AFC Bournemouth	Home	2–2	5,426	Ray McKinnon, Gary Doherty
06 February 1999	Burnley	Away	2–1	10,285	Andrew Fotiadis, Gary Doherty
13 February 1999	Wrexham	Home	1–2	4,759	Gary Doherty
20 February 1999	Bristol Rovers	Away	0–1	6,361	
23 February 1999	Notts County	Home	0–1	4,021	
27 February 1999	Blackpool	Home	1–0	4,646	Stuart Douglas
06 March 1999	Walsall	Away	0–1	4,508	
09 March 1999	Fulham	Home	0–4	7,424	
13 March 1999	Stoke City	Home	1–2	5,221	Graham Alexander(pen)
20 March 1999	Chesterfield	Away	1–3	3,921	Phil Gray
23 March 1999	Reading	Home	1–1	5,527	Matthew Spring
27 March 1999	Gillingham	Home	1–0	6,705	Sean Dyche
02 April 1998	Oldham Athletic	Away	1–1	4,948	Phil Gray
06 April 1999	York City	Home	2–1	4,667	Matthew Spring, Stuart Douglas
10 April 1999	Northampton Town	Away	0–1	6,856	
14 April 1999	Manchester City	Away	0–2	26,130	
17 April 1999	Lincoln City	Home	0–1	5,122	
24 April 1999	Notts County	Away	2–1	5,583	Tony Thorpe (2)
27 April 1999	Chesterfield	Home	1–0	4,287	Tony Thorpe
01 May 1999	Macclesfield Town	Home	1–2	5,738	Gary Doherty
09 May 1999	Millwall	Away	1–0	8,494	Tony Thorpe

=== FA Cup ===
Round	Date	Opponent	Venue	Result	Attendance	Goalscorers
R1	15 November 1998	Boreham Wood	Away	3–2	1,772	Phil Gray (2), Steve Davis
R2	05 December 1998	Hull City	Home	1–2	5,021	Steve Davis

=== League Cup ===
Round	Date	Opponent	Venue	Result	Attendance	Goalscorers
R1 1st leg	11 August 1998	Oxford United	Home	2–3	3,165	Graham Alexander (penx2)
R1 2nd leg	18 August 1998	Oxford United	Away	3–1	5,099	Phil Gray, Sean Evers, Paul McLaren
R2 1st leg	15 September 1998	Ipswich Town	Away	1–2	9,032	Stuart Douglas
R2 2nd leg	22 September 1998	Ipswich Town	Home	4–2	5,655	Andrew Fotiadis, Stuart Douglas, Steve Davis, Marvin Johnson
R3	27 October 1998	Coventry City	Home	2–0	9,051	Phil Gray, Steve Davis
R4	10 October 1998	Barnsley	Home	1–0	8,435	Phil Gray
QF	01 December 1998	Sunderland	Away	0–3	35,742	

=== Football League Trophy ===
Round	Date	Opponent	Venue	Result	Attendance	Goalscorers
SR2	05 January 1999	Walsall	Home	0–3	1,870	

== Squad ==
Note: Flags indicate national team as defined under FIFA eligibility rules; some limited exceptions apply. Players may hold more than one non-FIFA nationality.

No.	Pos.	Nation	Player
—	GK	ENG	Nathan Abbey
—	GK	ENG	Kelvin Davis
—	GK	ENG	Scott Ward
—	DF	SCO	Graham Alexander
—	DF	ENG	Steve Davis
—	DF	ENG	Sean Dyche
—	DF	BRB	Emmerson Boyce
—	DF	ENG	Marvin Johnson
—	DF	ENG	Gavin McGowan
—	DF	ENG	James Ayres
—	DF	ENG	Mitchell Thomas
—	DF	ENG	Alan White
—	DF	ENG	Matthew Taylor
—	DF	IRL	Gary Doherty
—	DF	SCO	Stuart Fraser
—	DF	ENG	Chris Willmott
—	MF	ENG	Sean Evers
—	MF	ENG	Paul McLaren

No.	Pos.	Nation	Player
—	MF	SCO	Ray McKinnon
—	MF	ENG	Paul Showler
—	MF	ENG	Andre Scarlett
—	MF	SCO	Michael McIndoe
—	MF	ENG	Matthew Spring
—	MF	ENG	Gerry Harrison
—	MF	WAL	Simon Davies
—	MF	ENG	Jimmy Cox
—	MF	ENG	Kofi Nyamah
—	FW	ENG	Stuart Douglas
—	FW	ENG	Andrew Fotiadis
—	FW	IRL	Liam George
—	FW	JAM	Dwight Marshall
—	FW	ENG	Tony Thorpe
—	FW	NIR	Phil Gray
—	FW	FRA	Hervé Bacqué
—	FW	COD	Trésor Kandol
—	FW	CIV	Landry Zahana-Oni

== Player statistics ==
Pos.	Name	League		FA Cup		League Cup		FL Trophy		Total	
Pos.	Name	Apps	Goals	Apps	Goals	Apps	Goals	Apps	Goals	Apps	Goals
MF	(England) Matthew Spring	45	3	1 (1)	0	7	0	0	0	53 (1)	3
GK	(England) Kelvin Davis	44	0	2	0	7	0	0	0	53	0
DF	(England) Marvin Johnson	42	0	1	0	7	1	0	0	50	1
FW	(England) Stuart Douglas	42	9	1 (1)	0	6	2	0	0	49 (1)	11
FW	(Northern Ireland) Phil Gray	32 (3)	8	2	2	6	3	0	0	40 (3)	13
DF	(England) Gavin McGowan	27 (4)	0	2	0	7	0	0	0	36 (4)	0
DF	(England) Alan White	18 (15)	1	1	0	0 (3)	0	1	0	20 (18)	1
MF	(England) Graham Alexander	28	4	2	0	7	2	0	0	37	6
MF	(England) Sean Evers	27	3	2	0	7	1	1	0	37	4
MF	(Scotland) Ray McKinnon	27	2	2	0	7	1	1	0	35 (2)	2
DF	(England) Mitchell Thomas	26 (6)	0	0	0	3	0	0	0	29 (6)	0
MF	(England) Paul McLaren	14 (9)	0	2	0	1 (3)	1	1	0	18 (12)	1
DF	(England) Steve Davis	20	6	2	2	7	2	0	0	29	10
MF	(Scotland) Michael McIndoe	17 (5)	0	0 (2)	0	2 (1)	0	1	0	20 (8)	0
FW	(England) Andrew Fotiadis	8 (13)	2	0	0	1 (2)	1	1	0	10 (15)	3
FW	(Republic of Ireland) Gary Doherty	5 (15)	6	1 (1)	0	0 (1)	0	0 (1)	0	6 (18)	6
MF	(England) Gerry Harrison	14	0	0	0	0	0	1	0	15	0
DF	(England) Sean Dyche	14	1	0	0	0	0	1	0	15	1
DF	(England) Chris Willmott	13 (1)	0	0	0	0	0	0	0	13 (1)	0
FW	(Republic of Ireland) Liam George	6 (6)	0	0	0	0 (2)	0	0	0	6 (8)	0
FW	(France) Hervé Bacqué	2 (5)	0	0	0	1 (2)	0	1	0	4 (7)	0
MF	(England) Jimmy Cox	3 (5)	0	0	0	1 (1)	0	0	0	4 (6)	0
DF	(Scotland) Stuart Fraser	5 (3)	0	0	0	0	0	1	0	6 (3)	0
FW	(England) Tony Thorpe	7 (1)	4	0	0	0	0	0	0	7 (1)	4
FW	(Ivory Coast) Landry Zahana-Oni	4 (4)	0	0	0	0	0	0	0	4 (4)	0
MF	(England) Andre Scarlett	2 (4)	1	0 (1)	0	0	0	0 (1)	0	2 (6)	1
FW	(Jamaica) Dwight Marshall	3 (1)	1	0	0	3	0	0	0	6 (1)	1
FW	(Democratic Republic of the Congo) Trésor Kandol	2 (2)	0	0	0	0	0	0 (1)	0	2 (3)	0
GK	(England) Nathan Abbey	2	0	0	0	0	0	1	0	3	0
MF	(England) Paul Showler	2 (1)	0	0	0	0	0	0	0	2 (1)	0
MF	(Wales) Simon Davies	2	0	0	0	0	0	0	0	2	0
DF	(Barbados) Emmerson Boyce	1	0	0	0	0	0	1	0	2	0
MF	(England) Kofi Nyamah	0	0	1	0	0 (1)	0	0	0	1 (1)	0
