= 1999–2000 Luton Town F.C. season =

English football club season

Luton Town
1999–2000 season
- Chairman: Cliff Bassett
- Manager: Lennie Lawrence
- Stadium: Kenilworth Road
- Second Division: 13th
- FA Cup: Third round
- League Cup: First round
- Football League Trophy: First round
- Top goalscorer: League: George (14); All: George (16)
- Average home league attendance: 5,658

During the 1999–2000 English football season, Luton Town F.C. competed in the Football League Second Division.

== Background ==
Luton suffered from severe financial difficulty throughout the 1998–99 season and were forced to sell a number of established players and promising young stars.One of the club's directors, Cliff Bassett, made the decision to place the club into receivership as part of a move to shift controversial owner David Kohler out of the club. Kohler, accused by Luton supporters of selling the club's assets while continuing to draw a large salary of his own and of promoting an unworkable stadium project (known as the 'Kohlerdome') for his own means, relinquished his position as chairman on 20 February 1999 following the discovery of a petrol bomb in his letterbox. Despite his departure, Kohler remained as the majority shareholder and held out from selling until a suitable offer was made. Numerous bids from consortia fell through, unable to meet Kohler's demands, until, after being told by the Football League that the club would be unable to compete in the 1999–2000 season unless it was out of receivership, Bassett himself stepped in hours before the deadline and bought out Kohler's shares. Luton finished the 1999–2000 season in 13th position, relying heavily on players brought through the youth system, such as Emmerson Boyce, Gary Doherty, Matthew Taylor, Matthew Spring and Liam George. Bassett made it clear throughout the season that his intention was to find a new owner for the club and, on 23 May 2000, Luton Town was sold to a consortium led by businessman Mike Watson-Challis.

== Season summary ==
Just before the 1999–2000 season, the club was sold to Cliff Bassett, while player sales continued to balance the books. Young duo Kelvin Davis and Chris Willmott were sold to Wimbledon for £900,000, and Lawrence was forced to sell Gary Doherty late on in the season, but he successfully kept an inexperienced Luton side up once again. Mike Watson-Challis then purchased the club in 2000, and Lawrence was sacked to be replaced by former Luton player Ricky Hill.

== Final league table ==
| Pos | Team | Pld | W | D | L | GF | GA | GD | Pts |
|---|---|---|---|---|---|---|---|---|---|
| 11 | Wrexham | 46 | 17 | 11 | 18 | 52 | 61 | −9 | 62 |
| 12 | Wycombe Wanderers | 46 | 16 | 13 | 17 | 56 | 53 | +3 | 61 |
| 13 | Luton Town | 46 | 17 | 10 | 19 | 61 | 65 | −4 | 61 |
| 14 | Oldham Athletic | 46 | 16 | 12 | 18 | 50 | 55 | −5 | 60 |
| 15 | Bury | 46 | 13 | 18 | 15 | 61 | 64 | −3 | 57 |

Rules for classification: 1) Points; 2) Goal difference; 3) Goals scored

== Results ==
Luton Town's score comes first

=== Legend ===
| Win | Draw | Loss |

=== Football League Second Division ===
| Date | Opponent | Venue | Result | Attendance | Scorers |
|---|---|---|---|---|---|
| 7 August 1999 | Notts County | A | 0–0 | 6,141 | |
| 14 August 1999 | Blackpool | H | 3–2 | 5,176 | George (2), Spring |
| 21 August 1999 | Reading | A | 2–1 | 8,741 | Fotiadis, George |
| 28 August 1999 | Cardiff City | H | 1–0 | 5,374 | Gray |
| 31 August 1999 | AFC Bournemouth | A | 0–1 | 4,797 | |
| 4 September 1999 | Bury | H | 1–1 | 4,633 | Fotiadis |
| 11 September 1999 | Wrexham | H | 3–1 | 5,121 | Taylor, Spring, George |
| 18 September 1999 | Brentford | A | 0–2 | 7,039 | |
| 25 September 1999 | Oxford United | H | 4–2 | 6,102 | George (2), Fraser, Locke |
| 2 October 1999 | Wigan Athletic | A | 0–1 | 6,866 | |
| 9 October 1999 | Oldham Athletic | A | 1–2 | 4,532 | Midgley |
| 16 October 1999 | Gillingham | H | 3–1 | 6,394 | George (2, 1 pen), Douglas |
| 19 October 1999 | Wycombe Wanderers | H | 1–1 | 5,820 | Douglas |
| 23 October 1999 | Oxford United | A | 1–0 | 5,866 | George |
| 2 November 1999 | Millwall | A | 0–1 | 6,181 | |
| 6 November 1999 | Burnley | H | 2–1 | 7,205 | Midgley (2) |
| 12 November 1999 | Cambridge United | A | 1–3 | 6,211 | George |
| 23 November 1999 | Preston North End | H | 0–2 | 5,124 | |
| 27 November 1999 | Bristol Rovers | A | 0–3 | 7,805 | |
| 4 December 1999 | Notts County | H | 2–2 | 5,195 | Doherty, Thorpe |
| 17 December 1999 | Colchester United | A | 0–3 | 3,049 | |
| 26 December 1999 | Chesterfield | H | 1–1 | 5,870 | Locke |
| 28 December 1999 | Bristol City | A | 0–0 | 11,832 | |
| 3 January 2000 | Scunthorpe United | H | 4–1 | 5,574 | Douglas, Gray, Spring (2) |
| 8 January 2000 | Stoke City | A | 1–2 | 10,016 | Spring (pen) |
| 15 January 2000 | Blackpool | A | 3–3 | 5,262 | Locke, Gray, Taylor |
| 22 January 2000 | Reading | H | 3–1 | 6,044 | Watts, George (2) |
| 30 January 2000 | Cardiff City | A | 3–1 | 6,185 | Watts, Spring, George |
| 5 February 2000 | AFC Bournemouth | H | 1–2 | 5,961 | Boyce |
| 8 February 2000 | Stoke City | H | 2–1 | 5,396 | Gray (2) |
| 12 February 2000 | Bury | A | 0–1 | 3,760 | |
| 19 February 2000 | Bristol Rovers | H | 1–4 | 6,520 | Gray |
| 26 February 2000 | Brentford | H | 1–2 | 6,029 | Gray |
| 4 March 2000 | Wrexham | A | 0–1 | 2,703 | |
| 7 March 2000 | Burnley | A | 2–0 | 12,080 | White, Gray |
| 11 March 2000 | Millwall | H | 0–2 | 6,341 | |
| 18 March 2000 | Preston North End | A | 0–1 | 13,731 | |
| 21 March 2000 | Cambridge United | H | 2–2 | 5,379 | Doherty, McLaren |
| 25 March 2000 | Chesterfield | A | 3–1 | 2,597 | Doherty, Watts, George |
| 1 April 2000 | Colchester United | H | 3–2 | 5,125 | Watts, Doherty, Taylor |
| 8 April 2000 | Scunthorpe United | A | 2–1 | 3,811 | Gray, Doherty |
| 18 April 2000 | Bristol City | H | 1–2 | 4,771 | Doherty |
| 22 April 2000 | Gillingham | A | 0–2 | 8,667 | |
| 24 April 2000 | Wigan Athletic | H | 1–1 | 5,010 | Gray |
| 29 April 2000 | Wycombe Wanderers | A | 1–0 | 5,379 | Taylor |
| 6 May 2000 | Oldham Athletic | H | 1–1 | 5,963 | Gray |

=== FA Cup ===
| Round | Date | Opponent | Venue | Result | Attendance | Goalscorers |
|---|---|---|---|---|---|---|
| R1 | 30 October 1999 | Kingstonian | H | 4–2 | 4,682 | Gray, George, Spring, Taylor |
| R2 | 19 November 1999 | Lincoln City | H | 2–2 | 4,291 | Doherty (2) |
| R2R | 30 November 1999 | Lincoln City | A | 1–0 | 3,822 | Douglas |
| R3 | 11 December 1999 | Fulham | A | 2–2 | 8,251 | George, Spring |
| R3R | 21 December 1999 | Fulham | H | 0–3 | 8,170 | |

=== League Cup ===
| Round | Date | Opponent | Venue | Result | Attendance | Goalscorers |
|---|---|---|---|---|---|---|
| R1 1st Leg | 10 August 1999 | Bristol Rovers | H | 0–2 | 2,984 | |
| R1 2nd Leg | 24 August 1999 | Bristol Rovers | A | 2–2 (lost 2–4 agg) | 4,414 | Kandol, Doherty |

=== Football League Trophy ===
| Round | Date | Opponent | Venue | Result | Attendance | Goalscorers |
|---|---|---|---|---|---|---|
| SR1 | 7 December 1999 | Oxford United | A | 0–2 | 1,220 | |

== Squad ==
Note: Flags indicate national team as defined under FIFA eligibility rules; some limited exceptions apply. Players may hold more than one non-FIFA nationality.

| No. | Pos. | Nation | Player |
|---|---|---|---|
| 1 | GK | (England) ENG | Nathan Abbey |
| 2 | DF | (England) ENG | Gavin McGowan |
| 4 | MF | (England) ENG | Matthew Spring |
| 5 | DF | (England) ENG | Alan White |
| 6 | DF | (England) ENG | Marvin Johnson |
| 7 | FW | (Northern Ireland) NIR | Phil Gray |
| 8 | MF | (England) ENG | Paul McLaren |
| 9 | FW | (England) ENG | Stuart Douglas |
| 10 | MF | (Scotland) SCO | Michael McIndoe |
| 11 | FW | (Republic of Ireland) IRL | Liam George |
| 13 | DF | (Scotland) SCO | Stuart Fraser |
| 14 | FW | (England) ENG | Andrew Fotiadis |
| 15 | DF | (England) ENG | Matthew Taylor |

| No. | Pos. | Nation | Player |
|---|---|---|---|
| 16 | MF | (Ivory Coast) CIV | Landry Zahana-Oni |
| 17 | DF | (Barbados) BRB | Emmerson Boyce |
| 18 | FW | (Democratic Republic of the Congo) COD | Trésor Kandol |
| 19 | DF | (England) ENG | James Ayres |
| 20 | MF | (Uganda) UGA | Jerry Moses |
| 21 | MF | (England) ENG | Andre Scarlett |
| 22 | GK | (England) ENG | Daniel Tate |
| 23 | DF | (England) ENG | Jude Stirling |
| 24 | GK | (England) ENG | Scott Ward |
| 28 | MF | (England) ENG | Adam Locke |
| 32 | GK | (England) ENG | Ben Roberts (on loan from Middlesbrough) |
| 40 | DF | (England) ENG | Julian Watts |

=== Left club during season ===
Note: Flags indicate national team as defined under FIFA eligibility rules; some limited exceptions apply. Players may hold more than one non-FIFA nationality.

| No. | Pos. | Nation | Player |
|---|---|---|---|
| 27 | MF | (Scotland) SCO | Ray McKinnon (to Livingston) |
| 30 | FW | (England) ENG | Neil Midgley (on loan from Ipswich Town) |
| 39 | FW | (England) ENG | Tony Thorpe (on loan from Bristol City) |
| 3 | DF | (Nigeria) NGA | Efe Sodje (to Colchester United) |

| No. | Pos. | Nation | Player |
|---|---|---|---|
| 12 | DF | (Republic of Ireland) IRL | Gary Doherty (to Tottenham Hotspur) |
| 25 | MF | (England) ENG | Ryan Davis (Released) |
| 26 | MF | (England) ENG | David Castro-Pearson (Released) |
| 31 | FW | (England) ENG | Paul Read (Released) |

== Player details ==
Players arranged in alphabetical order by surname.

| Pos. | Name | League | | FA Cup | | League Cup | | FL Trophy | | Total | |
| Pos. | Name | Apps | Goals | Apps | Goals | Apps | Goals | Apps | Goals | Apps | Goals |
|---|---|---|---|---|---|---|---|---|---|---|---|
| GK | (England) Nathan Abbey | 32 (1) | 0 | 5 | 0 | 2 | 0 | 1 | 0 | 40 (1) | 0 |
| DF | (England) James Ayres | 0 | 0 | 0 | 0 | 0 | 0 | 1 | 0 | 1 | 0 |
| DF | (Barbados) Emmerson Boyce | 23 (7) | 1 | 0 (2) | 0 | 2 | 0 | 1 | 0 | 26 (9) | 1 |
| DF | (Republic of Ireland) Gary Doherty | 40 | 6 | 5 | 2 | 0 (2) | 1 | 1 | 0 | 46 (2) | 9 |
| FW | (England) Stuart Douglas | 35 (5) | 3 | 5 | 1 | 2 | 0 | 1 | 0 | 43 (5) | 4 |
| FW | (England) Andrew Fotiadis | 8 (14) | 2 | 0 | 0 | 0 (2) | 0 | 0 | 0 | 8 (16) | 2 |
| DF | (Scotland) Stuart Fraser | 20 | 1 | 5 | 0 | 1 | 0 | 1 | 0 | 27 | 1 |
| FW | (Republic of Ireland) Liam George | 35 (7) | 14 | 5 | 2 | 0 (1) | 0 | 1 | 0 | 41 (8) | 16 |
| FW | (Northern Ireland) Phil Gray | 28 (1) | 11 | 1 | 1 | 2 | 0 | 0 | 0 | 31 (1) | 12 |
| DF | (England) Marvin Johnson | 44 | 0 | 5 | 0 | 0 | 0 | 1 | 0 | 50 | 0 |
| FW | (Democratic Republic of the Congo) Trésor Kandol | 1 (3) | 0 | 0 | 0 | 1 | 1 | 0 | 0 | 2 (3) | 1 |
| MF | (England) Adam Locke | 27 (7) | 3 | 3 (1) | 0 | 1 | 0 | 1 | 0 | 31 (8) | 3 |
| DF | (England) Gavin McGowan | 9 (3) | 0 | 0 | 0 | 0 | 0 | 0 | 0 | 9 (3) | 0 |
| MF | (Scotland) Michael McIndoe | 2 (14) | 0 | 0 (2) | 0 | 2 | 0 | 0 | 0 | 4 (16) | 0 |
| MF | (Scotland) Ray McKinnon | 0 (3) | 0 | 0 | 0 | 1 | 0 | 0 | 0 | 1 (3) | 0 |
| FW | (England) Paul McLaren | 25 (4) | 1 | 4) | 0 | 1 | 0 | 0 | 0 | 30 (4) | 1 |
| FW | (England) Neil Midgley | 8 (2) | 3 | 0 | 0 | 0 | 0 | 0 | 0 | 8 (2) | 3 |
| FW | (England) Paul Read | 0 | 0 | 0 | 0 | 0 | 0 | 0 (1) | 0 | 0 (1) | 0 |
| GK | (England) Ben Roberts | 14 | 0 | 0 | 0 | 0 | 0 | 0 | 0 | 14 | 0 |
| MF | (England) Andre Scarlett | 2 (1) | 0 | 0 | 0 | 0 | 0 | 0 (1) | 0 | 2 (2) | 0 |
| DF | (Nigeria) Efe Sodje | 5 (4) | 0 | 1 (1) | 0 | 2 | 0 | 1 | 0 | 9 (5) | 0 |
| MF | (England) Matthew Spring | 44 (1) | 6 | 5 | 2 | 1 | 0 | 1 | 0 | 51 (1) | 8 |
| DF | (England) Matthew Taylor | 39 (2) | 4 | 5 | 1 | 1 | 0 | 0 | 0 | 45 (2) | 5 |
| FW | (England) Tony Thorpe | 3 (1) | 1 | 0 | 0 | 0 | 0 | 0 | 0 | 3 (1) | 1 |
| DF | (England) Julian Watts | 45 | 4 | 5 | 0 | 2 | 0 | 0 | 0 | 52 | 4 |
| DF | (England) Alan White | 16 (3) | 1 | 0 | 0 | 2 | 0 | 0 | 0 | 18 (3) | 1 |
| MF | (Ivory Coast) Landry Zahana-Oni | 0 (1) | 0 | 0 | 0 | 0 | 0 | 0 | 0 | 0 (1) | 0 |

== See also ==
- List of Luton Town F.C. seasons
