= Emmerson Boyce =

Barbadian footballer (born 1979)

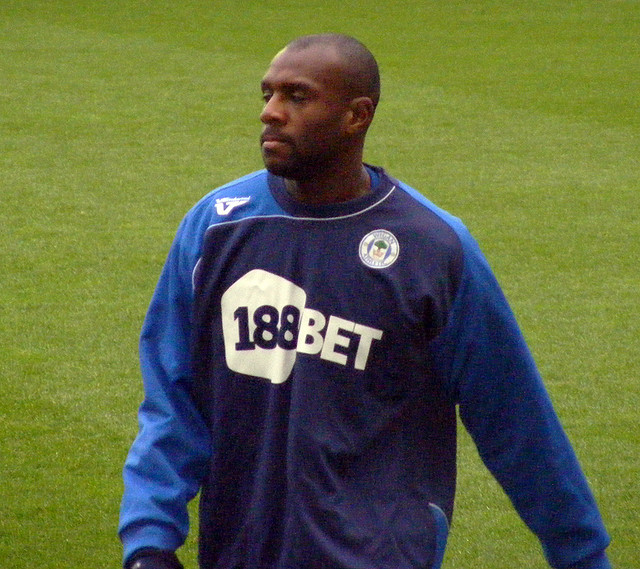
- Boyce with Wigan Athletic in 2009

Personal information
- Full name: Emmerson Orlando Boyce
- Date of birth: 24 September 1979 (age 47)
- Place of birth: Aylesbury, England
- Height: 1.80 m (5 ft 11 in)
- Position: Defender

Youth career
- 1990–1995: Aylesbury Athletic
- 1995–1998: Luton Town

Senior career*
| Years | Team | Apps | (Gls) |
| 1998–2004 | Luton Town | 186 | (8) |
| 2004–2006 | Crystal Palace | 69 | (2) |
| 2006–2015 | Wigan Athletic | 263 | (13) |
| 2015–2016 | Blackpool | 26 | (0) |
| 2020 | Ashton Town | 1 | (0) |
| Total | | 544 | (22) |

International career
| 2008–2016 | Barbados | 12 | (3) |

Managerial career
- 2023: Barbados (Interim)
- 2024–2025: Wigan Athletic Women
- * Club domestic league appearances and goals

Emmerson Orlando Boyce (born 24 September 1979) is a professional football coach and former player. He was the manager of Wigan Athletic Women, leaving at the close of the 2024/25 season. He usually played as a right back, but could also be deployed in the centre of defence or at right wingback.

Born in Aylesbury, England, Boyce started his career at the age of 16 as an apprentice at Luton Town F.C. He eventually established himself in the first team, and went on to make 185 league appearances for the club, scoring eight goals.

He joined Crystal Palace F.C. on a free transfer in 2004, where he played in the Premier League for the first time, but the club was relegated to the Championship. He spent two years at the club, making 69 league appearances and scoring one goal.

After Crystal Palace failed to gain promotion, Boyce returned to Premier League football in 2006, this time with Wigan Athletic F.C. after completing a move for a fee of £1 million, and was a key player during his first season when the club narrowly avoided relegation. He remained an active member of the first-team throughout his spell at Wigan, and is the club's Premier League appearance record holder. In May 2013, he captained Wigan Athletic to victory in the 2013 FA Cup Final in a 1–0 win over Manchester City. He last played for Blackpool in the 2015–16 League One season.

Boyce has also represented the Barbados national team, making his debut for the side in 2008. He was the former the sporting director of the Barbados national team and is also the caretaker manager for the team.

== Club career ==
=== Early life and career ===
Boyce was born on 24 September 1979 in Aylesbury, Buckinghamshire. He grew up in Elmhurst with his parents, Lucille and Melvin, and attended Quarrendon CE Secondary School, where he set athletics records. He began playing football for his local team Aylesbury United F.C. at the age of ten. He played as a striker for two years before being moved to his more familiar position in defence. Boyce was initially unhappy about being moved into his new position, but coach Steve Greenhalf believed Boyce could successfully become a professional footballer as a defender. From the age of twelve, Boyce attended the Luton School of Excellence, and in the summer of 1995 he became an apprentice at Luton Town.

=== Luton Town ===
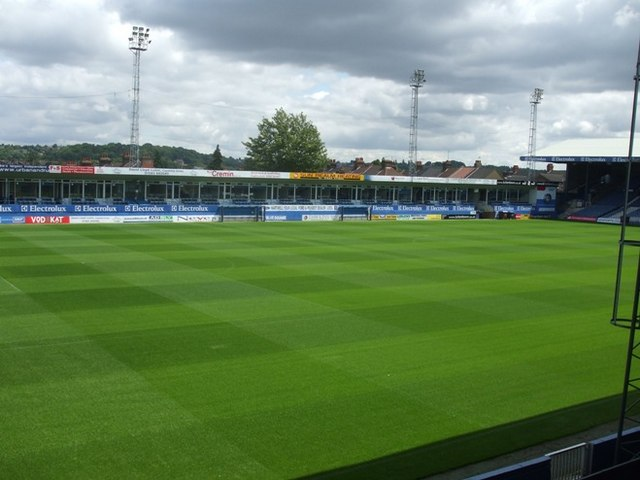
Kenilworth Road, the ground where Boyce made his debut

Boyce spent three years playing for Luton's youth team, where he played alongside Gary Doherty and Matthew Upson. The team reached the semi-final of the FA Youth Cup in 1997. He signed professional terms with the club in 1998, and made his debut on 5 January 1999 in a 3–0 home defeat against Walsall in the Football League Trophy. He appeared once more later in the season, making his league debut in April 1999, in a 1–0 defeat against Lincoln City. At the start of the following season, he was regularly on the substitutes bench, but due to the poor form of first choice right-back Stuart Fraser he was given the opportunity to start the match at home against Chesterfield on Boxing Day. He kept his place in the starting lineup and played 30 times in the league during the season, and scored his first goal for the club in a 2–1 defeat against Bournemouth in February 2000. Boyce started the 2000–01 season in the centre of defence. New Luton manager Ricky Hill praised Boyce for his "tremendous" displays, and felt he deserved a call-up to the England under-21 squad. He played 42 times in the league, scoring three goals as Luton were relegated to the Third Division.

Boyce was a key figure in the following season for Luton as they gained promotion back into the Second Division, and he was rewarded with a new two-year contract. Despite strong competition for places, he continued playing regularly for Luton in the 2002–03 season, making 34 appearances in the league. During his final season with the club, he made 42 league appearances, scoring four goals, and his performances were recognised when he received the Players' Player, Supporters' Player and Internet Player of the Season awards. In the summer of 2004, he rejected a new contract with Luton and decided to leave the club after his existing contract expired.

=== Crystal Palace ===
Following a short trial, Boyce moved to Crystal Palace in July 2004 on a free transfer, signing a two-year deal with the club. He made his debut on 14 August 2004 in Palace's opening Premier League game against Norwich City, and quickly established himself as the club's first-choice right back, and played in almost every league game for the club until a foot injury in March 2005 ruled him out for the rest of the season. The incident occurred during a training session, shortly after Boyce had signed a new deal extending his contract until 2007. Palace were then relegated on the final day of the season after drawing in their match against Charlton Athletic. He returned to the starting line-up in the first game of the new season in the Championship against former club Luton Town. He was a near ever-present throughout the campaign, making 42 league appearances for the club, and scored what would be his only league goal during his time at Palace in a 2–0 win over Coventry City in November 2005. Palace missed out on promotion however, losing in the play-off semi-finals to Watford. Boyce had become a favourite with Palace fans and was voted Player of the Year in 2006.

With 12 months remaining on his current contract, Boyce rejected a new deal with Palace, stating his desire to return to the Premier League. Rather than letting him leave for free at the end of his contract per the Bosman ruling, Palace accepted an offer for Boyce from Wigan Athletic.

=== Wigan Athletic ===
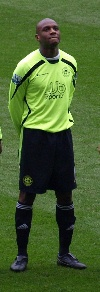
Boyce lining up for Wigan Athletic in 2009.

On 1 August 2006, Boyce was signed by Wigan Athletic on a four-year deal for an initial fee of £1 million. He was initially signed as a replacement on the right side of defence for Pascal Chimbonda, but was often deployed as a centre back. He made his debut for the club on 19 August 2006 in a Premier League match against Newcastle United. He made 34 league appearances during the season, helping the club avoid relegation, which was confirmed on the final day of the season in a 2–1 win against Sheffield United. His performances earned him praise from Wigan supporters, and he narrowly missed out on the club's Player of the Year award.

At the start of the 2007–08 season, following the signing of Mario Melchiot as the club's new first choice right-back, Boyce found his first team opportunities more limited. However, after a poor start to the season by Wigan, he returned to the starting line-up, which saw an upturn in results, and the club once again avoided relegation. He made 25 league appearances during the season, most of which came during the second half of the season.

On 15 November 2008, he was sent off for the first time in his career in a 2–2 draw against Newcastle United, after receiving a second yellow card. Replays showed that the decision was harsh, and Wigan manager Steve Bruce called for rule changes to allow clubs to appeal against yellow cards, and also to introduce video technology. Two weeks later, on 29 November 2008, he scored his first goal for Wigan, a header from the edge of the area in a 2–1 win against West Bromwich Albion. He finished the 2008–09 season with 27 appearances.

In July 2009, he signed a new contract at Wigan, keeping him at the club until 2012. The 2009–10 season was a frustrating one for Boyce. Under new manager Roberto Martínez, he was initially part of the starting line-up, but after being replaced by new signing Gary Caldwell in January, his playing time became more limited. He played 24 times in the league, scoring three goals — the most he had scored in a season since leaving Luton.

Boyce was back in the starting line-up at the beginning of the 2010–11 season, but suffered an injury against Bolton Wanderers in October 2010. He was initially expected to recover in two weeks, but was sidelined for considerably longer after aggravating the injury in training. He returned to the side on 8 January 2011 in the 3–2 FA Cup victory against Hull City. He appeared 22 times in the league, and started in the final game of the season against Stoke City, making a goal line clearance in the first half to keep the score level. Wigan went on to win the game 1–0, securing Premier League survival on the last day of the season for a second time. Boyce was the only Wigan player to play in both the Stoke game and the match against Sheffield United in 2007.

In August 2011, Boyce signed a new two-year contract at the club. On 25 February 2012, he made his 146th Premier League appearance in a 0–0 draw against Aston Villa, making him the club's record holder for most appearances in the Premier League. On 21 April, he scored his fifth league goal for Wigan in a 2–1 away defeat to Fulham. On 9 May, Boyce was given the outstanding achievement award at Wigan's end of season awards. He followed this up on 13 May, the final match of the season, by scoring two goals against Wolves, including a spectacular volley from outside the penalty box.

In May 2013 he captained Wigan to win the FA Cup over Manchester City and jointly lifted the cup with non playing club captain Gary Caldwell. In March 2014, he was once again instrumental in captaining Wigan to an upset over Manchester City, this time in the 2014 FA Cup Quarterfinals.

=== Blackpool ===
In August 2015, Boyce ended a 9-year stay at Wigan and joined Blackpool on a free transfer. He was then released by Blackpool following their relegation from League One.

=== Ashton Town FC ===
In August 2020 Boyce came out of retirement to sign for Ashton Town FC after an invitation from chairman Mark Hayes.

== Coaching ==
After retiring in 2016 Boyce rejoined Wigan as an academy coach.

In July 2024, Boyce was appointed as the manager of the newly formed Wigan Athletic Women. He took charge of the team for the 2024/25 season, in which the team won Lancashire Women's County League Championship title, winning all 17 matches, reached the Challenge Cup Semi-Final and the League Cup Final. In May 2025, after the close of the 2024/25 season, Boyce announced he was stepping down from his role.

In November 2026, Boyce was appointed first team coach of Widnes Town F.C, as part of Gary Taylor-Fletcher's coaching team

== International career ==
Though born in England, Boyce was also eligible to play for the Barbados national team through his parents Melvin and Lucille, who were both born in Barbados. Boyce earned his first international call-up on 20 March 2008, aged 28, stating that "The appeal is to play international football. I consider myself a Barbadian and I feel it's the right thing to do to play for my country. I am really looking forward to it." He made his debut for Barbados in a 2010 FIFA World Cup qualifier against Dominica on 26 March 2008, in a 1–0 win which advanced Barbados to the second round of qualifying. His other appearance for Barbados that year came on 22 June in a 1–0 defeat against United States. Boyce was called up again for the 2014 World Cup qualifiers and captained the squad in a 2–0 loss to Guyana in Bridgetown. He was recalled to the team in 2014 and captained the squad during the 2014 Caribbean Cup qualification. He scored his first international goal in the 4–1 win over Bonaire that qualified them for the next round.

== Style of play ==
Boyce was a versatile player who usually played as a right back, but was also been used as a centre back on many occasions. He also played at left back, on the right wing and as a makeshift striker during his career. In the past, he stated that he does not have a preferred position and is happy to play wherever the manager wants him to play. When playing at right back, although Boyce accepts that his more important role in the team is to defend, he has also demonstrated his ability to get forward to contribute to the team's attack. His consistent performances have earned him praise on several occasions, and he has been described as a "reliable" and "dependable" player.

== Personal life ==
Boyce has three children, two boys and a girl.

Boyce became the first international ambassador for Street Soccer USA, an organisation which develops sports programs to help the homeless, and he has made appearances at homeless shelters in various cities across the United States. He was first introduced to the organisation after reading about it during a business trip to the United States. On his new role, Boyce commented that "Soccer is a global sport, it can lift all of our spirits and improve all of our lives and I want to promote the use of the beautiful game in this way. It is a privilege and an honor to be named the first International Ambassador for Street Soccer USA."

Boyce's sister is the solicitor I. Stephanie Boyce, who was inaugurated as Deputy Vice President of the Law Society of England and Wales in July 2019, making history as the first black person to hold the position. In March 2021 she became the President of the Law Society of England and Wales becoming the first Black and the first person of colour to do so.

== Career statistics ==
=== Club ===
Appearances and goals by club, season and competition
| Club | Season | League | | | FA Cup | | League Cup | | Other | | Total | |
| Club | Season | Division | Apps | Goals | Apps | Goals | Apps | Goals | Apps | Goals | Apps | Goals |
|---|---|---|---|---|---|---|---|---|---|---|---|---|
| Luton Town | 1998–99 | Second Division | 1 | 0 | 0 | 0 | 0 | 0 | 1 (Note: Appearance(s) in Football League Trophy) | 0 | 2 | 0 |
| Luton Town | 1999–2000 | Second Division | 30 | 1 | 2 | 0 | 2 | 0 | 1 | 0 | 35 | 1 |
| Luton Town | 2000–01 | Second Division | 42 | 3 | 3 | 0 | 4 | 0 | 0 | 0 | 49 | 3 |
| Luton Town | 2001–02 | Third Division | 37 | 0 | 0 | 0 | 1 | 0 | 0 | 0 | 38 | 0 |
| Luton Town | 2002–03 | Third Division | 34 | 0 | 2 | 0 | 2 | 0 | 1 | 0 | 39 | 0 |
| Luton Town | 2003–04 | Second Division | 42 | 4 | 5 | 1 | 2 | 0 | 0 | 0 | 49 | 5 |
| Luton Town | Total | | 186 | 8 | 12 | 1 | 11 | 0 | 3 | 0 | 212 | 9 |
| Crystal Palace | 2004–05 | Premier League | 27 | 0 | 0 | 0 | 1 | 0 | — | | 28 | 0 |
| Crystal Palace | 2005–06 | Championship | 42 | 2 | 3 | 0 | 2 | 0 | 2 (Note: Appearances in Championship play-offs) | 0 | 49 | 2 |
| Crystal Palace | Total | | 69 | 2 | 3 | 0 | 3 | 0 | 2 | 0 | 77 | 2 |
| Wigan Athletic | 2006–07 | Premier League | 34 | 0 | 1 | 0 | 0 | 0 | — | | 35 | 0 |
| Wigan Athletic | 2007–08 | Premier League | 25 | 0 | 1 | 0 | 1 | 0 | — | | 27 | 0 |
| Wigan Athletic | 2008–09 | Premier League | 27 | 1 | 1 | 0 | 3 | 0 | — | | 31 | 1 |
| Wigan Athletic | 2009–10 | Premier League | 24 | 3 | 2 | 0 | 1 | 0 | — | | 27 | 3 |
| Wigan Athletic | 2010–11 | Premier League | 22 | 0 | 2 | 0 | 1 | 0 | — | | 25 | 0 |
| Wigan Athletic | 2011–12 | Premier League | 26 | 3 | 1 | 0 | 0 | 0 | — | | 27 | 3 |
| Wigan Athletic | 2012–13 | Premier League | 36 | 4 | 5 | 0 | 0 | 0 | — | | 41 | 4 |
| Wigan Athletic | 2013–14 | Championship | 42 | 2 | 6 | 0 | 1 | 0 | 8 (Note: Five appearances in UEFA Europa League, one in FA Community Shield, two in Championship play-offs) | 0 | 57 | 2 |
| Wigan Athletic | 2014–15 | Championship | 27 | 0 | 1 | 0 | 0 | 0 | — | | 28 | 0 |
| Wigan Athletic | Total | | 263 | 13 | 20 | 0 | 7 | 0 | 8 | 0 | 298 | 13 |
| Blackpool | 2015–16 | League One | 26 | 0 | 0 | 0 | 0 | 0 | — | | 26 | 0 |
| Career total | | | 544 | 23 | 35 | 1 | 21 | 0 | 13 | 0 | 613 | 24 |

=== International ===
As of match played 29 March 2016.

Appearances and goals by national team and year
| National team | Year | Apps | Goals |
|---|---|---|---|
| Barbados | 2008 | 2 | 0 |
| Barbados | 2011 | 2 | 0 |
| Barbados | 2014 | 3 | 1 |
| Barbados | 2015 | 3 | 2 |
| Barbados | 2016 | 2 | 0 |
| Total | | 12 | 3 |

=== International goals ===
Scores and Results list Barbados' goal tally first.

| # | Date | Venue | Opponent | Score | Result | Competition | Source |
|---|---|---|---|---|---|---|---|
| 1 | 7 September 2014 | Stade d'Honneur de Dillon, Fort-de-France, Martinique | Bonaire | 1–0 | 4–1 | 2014 Caribbean Cup qualification | |
| 2 | 10 June 2015 | Trinidad Stadium, Oranjestad, Aruba | Aruba | 1–0 | 2–0 | 2018 FIFA World Cup qualification | |
| 3 | 10 June 2015 | Trinidad Stadium, Oranjestad, Aruba | Aruba | 2–0 | 2–0 | 2018 FIFA World Cup qualification | |

== Honours ==
=== Player ===
Wigan Athletic

- FA Cup: 2012–13

=== Manager ===
Wigan Athletic Women

- Lancashire Women's County League Premier Division: 2024–25
