= 2005–06 Norwich City F.C. season =

Norwich City
2005–06 season
- Chairman: Roger Munby
- Manager: Nigel Worthington
- Stadium: Carrow Road
- Championship: 9th
- FA Cup: Third round
- League Cup: Third round
- Top goalscorer: League: Ashton (10); All: Ashton (11)
- Highest home attendance: 25,402 (vs. Ipswich Town, 5 February 2006)
- Lowest home attendance: 23,838 (vs. Cardiff City, 1 November 2005)
- Average home league attendance: 24,833
Home colours	Away colours

The 2005–06 season was Norwich City's first year back in the Football League Championship after being relegated from the Premier League in the previous season. This article shows statistics and lists all matches that Norwich City played in the season.

== Final league table ==
Pos	Team	Pld	W	D	L	GF	GA	GD	Pts
7	Wolverhampton Wanderers	46	16	19	11	50	42	+8	67
8	Coventry City	46	16	15	15	62	65	−3	63
9	Norwich City	46	18	8	20	56	65	−9	62
10	Luton Town	46	17	10	19	66	67	−1	61
11	Cardiff City	46	16	12	18	58	59	−1	60

Updated to match(es) played on 2 December 2011. Source: RSSSF
Rules for classification: 1) points; 2) goal difference; 3) number of goals scored.

== Matches ==
Win Draw Loss

=== League ===
Round	1	2	3	4	5	6	7	8	9	10	11	12	13	14	15	16	17	18	19	20	21	22	23
Result	1–1	1–1	1–1	0–1	0–1	1–3	2–0	1–2	1–0	0–1	2–1	3–1	1–1	2–4	0–3	0–1	1–0	0–2	2–0	0–1	2–2	0–2	2–1
Position	10	14	17	20	21	23	18	21	17	18	16	12	13	15	17	20	14	17	15	15	16	18	16

Round	24	25	26	27	28	29	30	31	32	33	34	35	36	37	38	39	40	41	42	43	44	45	46
Result	3–1	3–1	2–1	1–0	0–3	1–1	2–3	0–4	1–2	1–1	3–0	2–0	1–4	2–1	2–2	2–1	0–2	2–1	0–2	0–1	3–2	1–0	1–2
Position	13	12	12	11	11	10	11	12	14	14	12	11	12	10	11	9	9	9	9	11	10	8	9

==== August ====
6 August 2005	Norwich City	1–1	Coventry City	Norwich, Norfolk
15:00 BST	Ashton 21'	(Report)	Adebola 65'	Stadium: Carrow Road; Attendance: 25,355; Referee: Richard Beeby

9 August 2005	Norwich City	1–1	Crewe Alexandra	Norwich, Norfolk
19:45 BST	McKenzie 50'	(Report)	Varney 19'	Stadium: Carrow Road; Attendance: 25,116; Referee: Clive Penton

13 August 2005	Norwich City	1–1	Crystal Palace	Norwich, Norfolk
15:00 BST	Ashton 6'	(Report)	Johnson 42'	Stadium: Carrow Road; Attendance: 25,102; Referee: Iain Williamson

20 August 2005	Southampton	1–0	Norwich City	Southampton, Hampshire
15:00 BST	Quashie 15' (pen.)	(Report)		Stadium: St Mary's Stadium; Attendance: 23,498; Referee: Lee Probert

27 August 2005	Norwich City	0–1	Leeds United	Norwich, Norfolk
15:00 BST		(Report)	Hulse 67'	Stadium: Carrow Road; Attendance: 25,015; Referee: Uriah Rennie

29 August 2005	Stoke City	3–1	Norwich City	Stoke-on-Trent, Staffordshire
19:45 BST	Kolář 9'; Harper 45'; Sidibe 69'	(Report)	Ashton 38'; Huckerby (red card) 52'	Stadium: Britannia Stadium; Attendance: 14,249; Referee: Mike Pike

==== September ====
10 September 2005	Norwich City	2–0	Plymouth Argyle	Norwich, Norfolk
12:45 BST	Ashton 20'; Doumbé 37' (o.g.)	(Report)		Stadium: Carrow Road; Attendance: 23,981; Referee: Barry Knight

13 September 2005	Watford	2–1	Norwich City	Watford, Hertfordshire
19:45 BST	King 13'; Young 25'	(Report)	Lisbie 62'	Stadium: Vicarage Road; Attendance: 13,502; Referee: Paul Armstrong

18 September 2005	Ipswich Town	0–1	Norwich City	Ipswich, Suffolk
12:00 BST	Sito (red card) 18'	(Report)	Huckerby 51'	Stadium: Portman Road; Attendance: 29,184; Referee: Lee Mason

24 September 2005	Norwich City	0–1	Reading	Norwich, Norfolk
15:00 BST		(Report)	Harper 61'	Stadium: Carrow Road; Attendance: 24,850; Referee: Trevor Kettle

27 September 2005	Norwich City	2–1	Hull City	Norwich, Norfolk
19:45 BST	Safri 15'; Doherty 39'	(Report)	Cort 2'	Stadium: Carrow Road; Attendance: 24,740; Referee: Brian Curson

==== October ====
1 October 2005	Brighton & Hove Albion	1–3	Norwich City	Brighton, East Sussex
15:00 BST	Frutos 67'	(Report)	Huckerby 22'; McVeigh 41'; Henderson 85'	Stadium: Withdean Stadium; Attendance: 6,624; Referee: Phil Joslin

15 October 2005	Norwich City	1–1	Millwall	Norwich, Norfolk
15:00 BST	Ashton 52'	(Report)	Williams 23'; Hayles (yellow card) 30' (yellow-red card) 77'	Stadium: Carrow Road; Attendance: 25,095; Referee: Paul Taylor

18 October 2005	Luton Town	4–2	Norwich City	Luton, Bedfordshire
19:45 BST	Feeney 16'; Edwards 27'; Holmes 34'; Howard 41'	(Report)	Ashton 56'; Davenport (yellow card) 69' (yellow-red card) 82'; Ryan Jarvis 85'	Stadium: Kenilworth Road; Attendance: 10,248; Referee: Steve Tanner

22 October 2005	Queens Park Rangers	3–0	Norwich City	Shepherd's Bush, London
15:00 BST	Nygaard 11'; Furlong 18'; Santos 42'	(Report)		Stadium: Loftus Road; Attendance: 15,976; Referee: Ray Olivier

29 October 2005	Norwich City	0–1	Sheffield Wednesday	Norwich, Norfolk
15:00 BST		(Report)	Brunt 77'	Stadium: Carrow Road; Attendance: 25,383; Referee: J. Paul Robinson

==== November ====
1 November 2005	Norwich City	1–0	Cardiff City	Norwich, Norfolk
19:45 GMT	Alexander 77' (o.g.)	(Report)		Stadium: Carrow Road; Attendance: 23,838; Referee: Darren Drysdale

5 November 2005	Wolverhampton Wanderers	2–0	Norwich City	Wolverhampton, West Midlands
15:00 GMT	Seol 2'; Ganea 37'	(Report)		Stadium: Molineux; Attendance: 23,808; Referee: Chris Foy

19 November 2005	Norwich City	2–0	Luton Town	Norwich, Norfolk
15:00 GMT	Hughes 3'; Huckerby 25'	(Report)	Perrett (yellow card) 81' (yellow-red card) 90'; Nicholls (red card) AFT' (Note: Luton Town's Kevin Nicholls received a red card after the final whistle.)	Stadium: Carrow Road; Attendance: 25,383; Referee: Kevin Wright

22 November 2005	Millwall	1–0	Norwich City	Bermondsey, London
19:45 GMT	Elliott 70'	(Report)		Stadium: The Den; Attendance: 7,814; Referee: Andy Woolmer

26 November 2005	Coventry City	2–2	Norwich City	Coventry, West Midlands
15:00 GMT	McSheffrey 3'; Adebola 10'	(Report)	Davenport 40'; Fleming 84'	Stadium: Ricoh Arena; Attendance: 20,433; Referee: Rob Styles

==== December ====
3 December 2005	Derby County	2–0	Norwich City	Derby, Derbyshire
15:00 GMT	Davies 28', 52'	(Report)		Stadium: Pride Park; Attendance: 23,346; Referee: Andy Hall

10 December 2005	Crewe Alexandra	1–2	Norwich City	Crewe, Cheshire
15:00 GMT	B. Jones 16'	(Report)	McVeigh 64', 85'	Stadium: Alexandra Stadium; Attendance: 6,132; Referee: Phil Joslin

17 December 2005	Norwich City	3–1	Southampton	Norwich, Norfolk
15:00 GMT	Ashton 30', 51', 66'	(Report)	Belmadi 9'	Stadium: Carrow Road; Attendance: 24,836; Referee: Anthony Bates

26 December 2005	Sheffield United	1–3	Norwich City	Sheffield, South Yorkshire
15:00 GMT	Jagielka 22'	(Report)	McVeigh 33'; Ashton 62'; Morgan 71' (o.g.)	Stadium: Bramall Lane; Attendance: 26,505; Referee: Trevor Kettle

28 December 2005	Norwich City	2–1	Burnley	Norwich, Norfolk
19:45 GMT	Charlton 16'; Huckerby 39'	(Report)	Safri 73' (o.g.)	Stadium: Carrow Road; Attendance: 25,204; Referee: Clive Penton

31 December 2005	Leicester City	0–1	Norwich City	Leicester, Leicestershire
15:00 GMT		(Report)	McVeigh 71'	Stadium: Walkers Stadium; Attendance: 21,072; Referee: Anthony Leake

==== January ====
2 January 2006	Norwich City	0–3	Preston North End	Norwich, Norfolk
15:00 GMT		(Report)	Nowland 45'; Alexander 69' (pen.); Nugent 74'	Stadium: Carrow Road; Attendance: 25,032; Referee: Nigel Miller

14 January 2006	Plymouth Argyle	1–1	Norwich City	Plymouth, Devon
15:00 GMT	Charlton 24' (o.g.)	(Report)	Huckerby 48'	Stadium: Home Park; Attendance: 13,906; Referee: Andy Penn

21 January 2006	Norwich City	2–3	Watford	Norwich, Norfolk
15:00 GMT	McVeigh 44' (pen.); Thorne 62'	(Report)	Henderson 47', 65'; Spring 90'	Stadium: Carrow Road; Attendance: 25,384; Referee: Martin Atkinson

31 January 2006	Reading	4–0	Norwich City	Reading, Berkshire
20:00 GMT	Shorey 6'; Sidwell 17'; Lita 55'; Convey 69'	(Report)		Stadium: Madejski Stadium; Attendance: 21,442; Referee: Lee Mason

==== February ====
5 February 2006	Norwich City	1–2	Ipswich Town	Norwich, Norfolk
11:15 GMT	Johansson 33'	(Report)	Juan 38'; Doherty 88' (o.g.)	Stadium: Carrow Road; Attendance: 25,402; Referee: Keith Stroud

11 February 2006	Hull City	1–1	Norwich City	Kingston upon Hull, East Riding of Yorkshire
15:00 GMT	Cort 26'	(Report)	Elliott 87' (o.g.)	Stadium: KC Stadium; Attendance: 20,527; Referee: Jon Moss

14 February 2006	Norwich City	3–0	Brighton & Hove Albion	Norwich, Norfolk
19:45 GMT	Huckerby 51'; Earnshaw 87', 90'	(Report)	Hinshelwood (yellow card) 45' (yellow-red card) 57'	Stadium: Carrow Road; Attendance: 24,038; Referee: Mike Thorpe

18 February 2006	Norwich City	2–0	Derby County	Norwich, Norfolk
15:00 GMT	Johansson 26'; Huckerby 83'	(Report)		Stadium: Carrow Road; Attendance: 24,921; Referee: Andy Hall

25 February 2006	Crystal Palace	4–1	Norwich City	Selhurst, London
15:00 GMT	Johnson 7'; Watson 34'; Morrison 54'; Hall 62'	(Report)	Ward 88' (o.g.)	Stadium: Selhurst Park; Attendance: 19,066; Referee: Peter Walton

==== March ====
4 March 2006	Norwich City	2–1	Stoke City	Norwich, Norfolk
15:00 GMT	McKenzie 52'; Johansson 89'	(Report)	Gallagher 58'	Stadium: Carrow Road; Attendance: 24,223; Referee: Phil Crossley

11 March 2006	Leeds United	2–2	Norwich City	Leeds, West Yorkshire
15:00 GMT	Hulse 20'; Lewis 90'	(Report)	Hughes 57'; McVeigh 75'	Stadium: Elland Road; Attendance: 24,993; Referee: Chris Foy

18 March 2006	Norwich City	2–1	Sheffield United	Norwich, Norfolk
15:00 GMT	McKenzie 33'; Earnshaw 45'	(Report)	Armstrong 17'	Stadium: Carrow Road; Attendance: 25,346; Referee: Paul Taylor

24 March 2006	Burnley	2–0	Norwich City	Burnley, Lancashire
19:45 GMT	Gray 18'; Branch 51'	(Report)		Stadium: Turf Moor; Attendance: 11,938; Referee: Colin Webster

==== April ====
1 April 2006	Norwich City	2–1	Leicester City	Norwich, Norfolk
15:00 BST	Earnshaw 28'; McKenzie 77' (pen.)	(Report)	Williams 63'	Stadium: Carrow Road; Attendance: 24,718; Referee: Andy D'Urso

8 April 2006	Preston North End	2–0	Norwich City	Preston, Lancashire
15:00 BST	Shackell 20' (o.g.); Doherty 38' (o.g.)	(Report)		Stadium: Deepdale; Attendance: 15,714; Referee: Mick Fletcher

15 April 2006	Sheffield Wednesday	1–0	Norwich City	Sheffield, South Yorkshire
15:15 BST	Tudgay 45'	(Report)		Stadium: Hillsborough Stadium; Attendance: 30,755; Referee: Keith Stroud

17 April 2006	Norwich City	3–2	Queens Park Rangers	Norwich, Norfolk
15:00 BST	Huckerby 78'; Earnshaw 85', 90'	(Report)	Ainsworth 45'; Cook 61'	Stadium: Carrow Road; Attendance: 24,126; Referee: Brian Curson

22 April 2006	Cardiff City	0–1	Norwich City	Cardiff, Wales
15:00 BST		(Report)	Earnshaw 16'	Stadium: Ninian Park; Attendance: 11,590; Referee: Andre Marriner

30 April 2006	Norwich City	1–2	Wolverhampton Wanderers	Norwich, Norfolk
13:30 BST	Earnshaw 73'	(Report)	Rósa 45'; Kennedy 71'; Cameron (yellow card) 14' (yellow-red card) 81'	Stadium: Carrow Road; Attendance: 24,081; Referee: Iain Williamson

=== League Cup ===
23 August 2005 Round 1	Milton Keynes Dons	0–1 (a.e.t.)	Norwich City	Milton Keynes, Buckinghamshire
19:45 BST		Report	McKenzie 120'	Stadium: National Hockey Stadium; Attendance: 4,777; Referee: Anthony Bates

20 September 2005 Round 2	Norwich City	2–0	Northampton Town	Norwich, Norfolk
19:45 BST	Huckerby 34' (pen.); Ashton 78'	Report		Stadium: Carrow Road; Attendance: 16,766; Referee: Colin Webster

26 October 2005 Round 3	Birmingham City	2–1	Norwich City	Birmingham, West Midlands
19:45 BST	Pennant 5'; Jarošík 86'	Report	Taylor 41' (o.g.)	Stadium: St Andrew's; Attendance: 28,825; Referee: Martin Atkinson

=== FA Cup ===
7 January 2006 Round 3	Norwich City	1–2	West Ham United	Norwich, Norfolk
15:00 GMT	McVeigh 72' (pen.)	Report	Mullins 6'; Zamora 57'	Stadium: Carrow Road; Attendance: 23,968; Referee: Mike Riley

== Transfers ==
=== Summer ===
==== In ====
Date	Name	Price	From
22 June 2005	(England) Jason Jarrett	Free	(England) Wigan Athletic
27 June 2005	(France) Matthieu Louis-Jean	Free	(England) Nottingham Forest
1 July 2005	(England) Peter Thorne	Free	(Wales) Cardiff City
21 July 2005	(England) Andrew Hughes	Undisclosed	(England) Reading
21 July 2005	(Netherlands) Jürgen Colin	£263,000	(Netherlands) PSV Eindhoven
1 August 2005	(England) Dean Marney	Loan	(England) Tottenham Hotspur
	(Jamaica) Kevin Lisbie	Loan	(England) Charlton Athletic
	(England) Calum Davenport	Loan	(England) Tottenham Hotspur

==== Out ====
Date	Name	Price	To
27 June 2005	(Scotland) Gary Holt	Free	(England) Nottingham Forest
28 June 2005	(Denmark) Thomas Helveg	£135,000	(Germany) Borussia Mönchengladbach
	(Sweden) Mathias Svensson	£100,000	(Sweden) IF Elfsborg
6 July 2005	(England) Marc Edworthy	Free	(England) Derby County
	(Northern Ireland) Philip Mulryne	Undisclosed	(Wales) Cardiff City
5 August 2005	(Jamaica) Damien Francis (Note: Francis was born in Wandsworth, England, but also qualified to represent Jamaica internationally and made his international debut for Jamaica in 2003.)	Undisclosed	(England) Wigan Athletic

=== Winter ===
==== In ====
Date	Name	Price	From
3 January 2006	(Nigeria) Dickson Etuhu	£450,000	(England) Preston North End
	(Wales) Carl Robinson	£50,000	(England) Sunderland
	(Pakistan) Zesh Rehman	Loan	(England) Fulham
	(Finland) Jonatan Johansson	Loan	(England) Charlton Athletic
	(Wales) Robert Earnshaw	£3,500,000	(England) West Bromwich Albion

==== Out ====
Date	Name	Price	To
23 January 2006	(England) Dean Ashton	£7,250,000	(England) West Ham United
27 January 2006	(Canada) Jim Brennan	Free	(England) Southampton

== Players ==
=== First team squad ===
Squad at end of season.

Note: Flags indicate national team as defined under FIFA eligibility rules; some limited exceptions apply. Players may hold more than one non-FIFA nationality.

No.	Pos.	Nation	Player
1	GK	ENG	Robert Green
2	DF	FRA	Matthieu Louis-Jean
3	DF	ENG	Adam Drury
4	DF	ENG	Jason Shackell
5	DF	ENG	Craig Fleming
6	FW	ENG	Darren Huckerby
8	FW	ENG	Peter Thorne
10	FW	WAL	Robert Earnshaw (Note: Earnshaw was born in Mufulira, Zambia, but was raised in Wales and made his international debut for Wales in May 2002.)
11	FW	FIN	Jonatan Johansson (on loan from Charlton Athletic)
12	GK	WAL	Darren Ward (Note: Ward was born in Worksop, England, but also qualified to represent Wales internationally and made his international debut for Wales in June 2000.)
14	FW	ENG	Leon McKenzie
15	MF	MAR	Youssef Safri
16	DF	ENG	Simon Charlton
17	MF	ENG	Andrew Hughes

No.	Pos.	Nation	Player
18	MF	NIR	Paul McVeigh
19	DF	PAK	Zesh Rehman (Note: Rehman was born in Birmingham, England and represented them at U-18, U-19 and U-20 level, but also qualified to represent Pakistan internationally through his parents and made his international debut for Pakistan in December 2005.) (on loan from Fulham)
20	MF	NGA	Dickson Etuhu
21	GK	SCO	Paul Gallacher
22	FW	ENG	Ian Henderson
23	FW	ENG	Ryan Jarvis
24	DF	NED	Jürgen Colin
25	DF	ENG	Rossi Jarvis
27	DF	IRL	Gary Doherty
28	MF	IRL	Michael Spillane (Note: Spillane was born in Cambridge, England, but also qualified to represent the Republic of Ireland internationally and represented them at U-17, U-18, U-19 and U-21 level.)
30	GK	ENG	Joe Lewis
31	DF	SCO	Andrew Cave-Brown (Note: Cave-Brown was born in Gravesend, England, but also qualified to represent Scotland internationally and represented them at U-19 and U-20 level.)
33	MF	WAL	Carl Robinson

=== Left club during season ===
Note: Flags indicate national team as defined under FIFA eligibility rules; some limited exceptions apply. Players may hold more than one non-FIFA nationality.

No.	Pos.	Nation	Player
9	MF	ENG	Dean Marney (on loan from Tottenham Hotspur)
10	FW	ENG	Dean Ashton (to West Ham United)
11	DF	CAN	Jim Brennan (to Southampton)

No.	Pos.	Nation	Player
19	FW	JAM	Kevin Lisbie (Note: Lisbie was born in Hackney, England, but also qualified to represent Jamaica internationally and made his international debut for Jamaica in 2002.) (on loan from Charlton Athletic)
19	DF	ENG	David Wright (on loan from Wigan Athletic)
26	DF	ENG	Calum Davenport (on loan from Tottenham Hotspur)

== Board and staff members ==
=== Board members ===
Position	Name	Nationality
Chairman	Roger Munby	England
Vice Chairman	Barry Skipper	England
Joint Majority Shareholder	Delia Smith	England
Joint Majority Shareholder	Michael Wynn-Jones	Wales
Director	Michael Foulger	England
Chief Executive	Neil Doncaster	England

=== Coaching staff ===
Position	Staff
Manager	(Northern Ireland) Nigel Worthington
Assistant manager	(England) Doug Livermore
First team coach	(England) Steve Foley
Goalkeeping coach	(England) James Hollman
Youth coach	(England) Ricky Martin
Physiotherapist	(England) Neal Reynolds
Sports Science	(England) Dave Carolan
Sponsorship Sales Manager	(Scotland) Bryan Gunn

Last updated: 3 May 2006
Source: Norwich City FC
