= 2008–09 Charlton Athletic F.C. season =

Charlton Athletic
2008–09 season
- Manager: Alan Pardew (until November); Phil Parkinson (from November)
- Stadium: The Valley
- Football League Championship: 24th (relegated)
- FA Cup: Fourth round
- League Cup: First round
- Top goalscorer: League: Nicky Bailey (13); All: Nicky Bailey (13)
Home colours	Away colours

During the 2008–09 English football season, Charlton Athletic competed in the Football League Championship. It was their second consecutive season at this level since relegation from the Premier League at the end of the 2006–07 season. Along with competing in the Championship, the club also participated in the FA Cup, and the League Cup. The season covered the period from 1 July 2008 to 30 June 2009.

== Season summary ==
Charlton were tipped to make a strong challenge for promotion, but it all went wrong for the Addicks and by the time manager Alan Pardew was sacked in November the club was in serious danger of a second relegation in three seasons. He was replaced with former Colchester United manager Phil Parkinson, but he was unable to save Charlton from falling into English football's third tier for the first time since 1981, coming in last place, 12 points adrift of safety.

== Kit ==
Charlton's kits were produced by Spanish company Joma. with Carbrini Sportswear replacing Spanish property company, Llanera, who declared bankruptcy during the previous season.

== Players ==
=== First-team squad ===
Squad at end of season

Note: Flags indicate national team as defined under FIFA eligibility rules; some limited exceptions apply. Players may hold more than one non-FIFA nationality.

No.	Pos.	Nation	Player
1	GK	ENG	Nicky Weaver
2	DF	FRA	Yassin Moutaouakil
3	DF	CAF	Kelly Youga
4	MF	ENG	Nicky Bailey
5	MF	CHN	Zheng Zhi
6	DF	ENG	Mark Hudson
7	MF	ENG	Jonjo Shelvey
8	MF	IRL	Matt Holland (Note: Holland was born in Bury, England, but qualified to represent the Republic of Ireland internationally through his grandmother and made his debut for Republic of Ireland in 1999.)
9	FW	SCO	Andy Gray (Note: Gray was born in Harrogate, England, but also qualified to represent Scotland internationally through his father and made his international debut for Scotland in April 2003.)
10	FW	BUL	Svetoslav Todorov
11	MF	ENG	Darren Ambrose
12	DF	ENG	Darren Ward (on loan from Wolverhampton Wanderers)
14	MF	ENG	Matthew Spring
15	MF	ENG	Josh Wright
16	MF	ENG	Scott Wagstaff
17	FW	GHA	Chris Dickson (Note: Dickson was born in Southwark, England, but also qualified to represent Ghana and Jamaica internationally through his father and mother respectively and made his international debut for Ghana in August 2008.)
18	MF	GHA	Lloyd Sam (Note: Sam was born in Leeds, England, and represented them at U-20 level, but also qualified to represent Ghana internationally through his parents and would make his international debut for Ghana in October 2015.)

No.	Pos.	Nation	Player
19	MF	ENG	Dean Sinclair
20	MF	FRA	Therry Racon (Note: Racon was born in Villeneuve-Saint-Georges, France, but also qualified to represent Guadeloupe internationally and would make his international debut for Guadeloupe in June 2011.)
21	GK	IRL	Rob Elliot (Note: Elliot was born in Greenwich, England, but also qualified to represent the Republic of Ireland internationally through his father and represented them at under-19 level before making his international debut for the Republic of Ireland in May 2014.)
22	FW	WAL	Stuart Fleetwood (Note: Fleetwood was born in Gloucester, England, but also qualified to represent Wales internationally through his father, and represented them at U-17 and U-21 level.)
23	DF	POR	José Semedo
24	DF	ENG	Jonathan Fortune
26	DF	WAL	Grant Basey (Note: Basey was born in Bromley, England, but also qualified to represent Wales internationally through his grandmother and represented them at U-17, U-19, and U-21 level.)
27	MF	ENG	Rashid Yussuff
28	MF	IRL	Harry Arter (Note: Arter was born in Bexley, England, but qualified to represent the Republic of Ireland internationally through his grandparents and represented them at U-15, U-17, and U-19 level before making his debut for Republic of Ireland in June 2015.)
31	MF	ENG	Chris Solly
32	DF	ENG	Danny Butterfield (on loan from Crystal Palace)
33	DF	ENG	Aswad Thomas
34	DF	ENG	Jack Clark
35	GK	IRL	Darren Randolph
36	FW	COD	Trésor Kandol (on loan from Leeds United)
37	FW	JAM	Deon Burton (Note: Burton was born in Reading, England, but also qualified to represent Jamaica internationally and made his international debut for Jamaica in September 1997.)
38	MF	TUR	Tamer Tuna (Note: Tuna was born in Bexley, England, but also qualified to represent Turkey internationally and represented them at U-19 level.)

=== Left club during season ===
Note: Flags indicate national team as defined under FIFA eligibility rules; some limited exceptions apply. Players may hold more than one non-FIFA nationality.

No.	Pos.	Nation	Player
12	FW	ENG	Luke Varney (to Derby County)
14	MF	ENG	Jerome Thomas (on loan to Portsmouth)
14	MF	NIR	Keith Gillespie (on loan from Sheffield United)
25	FW	ENG	Izale McLeod (on loan to Millwall)
29	MF	SEN	Amdy Faye (to Stoke City)
29	DF	ENG	Martin Cranie (on loan from Portsmouth)
29	DF	SCO	Graeme Murty (Note: Murty was born in Saltburn-by-the-Sea, England, but also qualified to represent Scotland and the Republic of Ireland internationally through his father and grandfather respectively and made his international debut for Scotland in February 2004.) (on loan from Reading)

No.	Pos.	Nation	Player
30	MF	DEN	Martin Christensen (on loan to Lyngby Boldklub)
32	MF	DEN	Mikkel Rygaard Jensen (to Herfølge Boldklub)
34	FW	ALG	Hameur Bouazza (Note: Bouazza was born in Évry (now Évry-Courcouronnes), France, but also qualified to represent Algeria internationally through his parents and made his international debut for Algeria in February 2007.) (on loan from Fulham)
35	DF	ENG	Linvoy Primus (on loan from Portsmouth)
36	FW	ENG	Martyn Waghorn (on loan from Sunderland)
38	DF	SCO	Jay McEveley (Note: McEveley was born in Liverpool, England, and represented them at U-20 level, but also qualified to represent Scotland internationally and represented them at B level before making his international debut for Scotland in August 2007.) (on loan from Derby County)
38	MF	ENG	Tom Soares (on loan from Stoke City)

== Transfers ==
=== In ===
Date	Position	Name	Club From	Transfer Fee	Reference
24 May 2008	DF	Mark Hudson	Crystal Palace	Free	
9 August 2008	MF	Hameur Bouazza	Fulham	Season-long Loan (recalled 8 January)	
13 August 2008	MF	Nicky Bailey	Southend United	£750,000	
28 August 2008	DF	Linvoy Primus	Portsmouth	Three-month Loan	
27 November 2008	FW	Deon Burton	Sheffield Wednesday	Loan (made permanent 2 January)	
9 January 2009	MF	Matthew Spring	Luton Town	Undisclosed	
30 January 2009	FW	Trésor Kandol	Leeds United	Loan until end of season	
30 January 2009	DF	Darren Ward	Wolverhampton Wanderers	Loan until end of season	
2 March 2009	DF	Danny Butterfield	Crystal Palace	Loan until end of season	

=== Out ===
Date	Position	Name	Club To	Transfer Fee	Reference
12 June 2008	DF	Paddy McCarthy	Crystal Palace	Undisclosed	
30 June 2008	DF	Cory Gibbs	Free Agency	Released	
30 June 2008	DF	Chris Powell	Free Agency	Released (joined Leicester City on 27 August)	
14 July 2008	FW	Chris Iwelumo	Wolverhampton Wanderers	Undisclosed	
16 July 2008	FW	Marcus Bent	Birmingham City	£1,000,000	
31 July 2008	DF	Madjid Bougherra	Rangers	£2.500.000	
14 August 2008	DF	Ben Thatcher	Ipswich Town	Free	
15 August 2008	MF	Amdy Faye	Stoke City	Undisclosed	
15 August 2008	FW	Jerome Thomas	Portsmouth	Loan (made permanent 21 August)	
