= I. Stephanie Boyce =

British solicitor

I. Stephanie Boyce CBE FKC DL
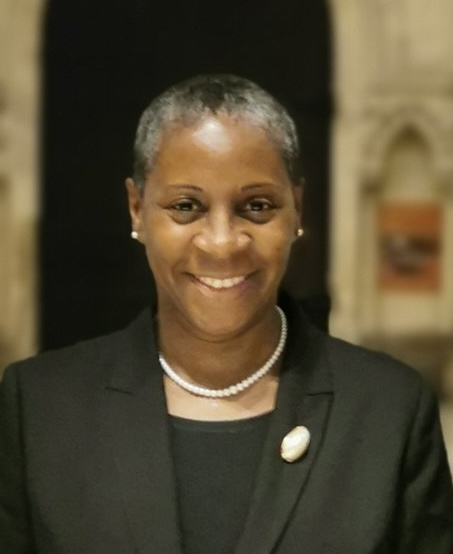
- Born: Ingrid Stephanie Boyce; 1972 (age 53–54)
- Occupation: Solicitor
- Years active: 1999–present

Ingrid Stephanie Boyce CBE FKC DL (born 1972) is a British solicitor. From March 2021 to October 2022, she was the president of the Law Society.

She made history as the first person of colour and first Black president of the Law Society of England and Wales. During her leadership, she oversaw the Law Society undergoing an organizational change and promoted initiatives related to diversity, inclusion, and public service.

== Life ==
Boyce is of Caribbean descent. Her mother, born on the island of Saint Vincent in Saint Vincent and the Grenadines, came to England aged 15 in 1967 to join her parents, who had emigrated there. Boyce's father had come to the United Kingdom from Barbados three years earlier. Boyce was born in Aylesbury, where she was brought up in a single-parent household on a council estate. The footballer Emmerson Boyce is her younger brother. When she was in her teens, the family relocated to the United States, where she lived for six years before returning to the United Kingdom to study law. She gained a law degree from London Guildhall University in 1999, and subsequently passed the Legal Practice Course at the College of Law, Guildford. She was admitted as a solicitor in 2002. In 2010, she gained a Master of Laws LLM in public law and global governance from King's College London.

She is the director of Stephanie Boyce Consulting Limited (10866503 - incorporated on 14 July 2017), a micro-entity company.

Boyce is a commissioner of the National Preparedness Commission and the Shinkwin Commission. She was a member of the independent taskforce commissioned by HM Treasury and the Department for Business, Energy and Industrial Strategy to boost socio-economic diversity at senior levels in UK financial and professional services.

== Law Society ==
Boyce was elected deputy vice president of the Law Society in 2019, taking up the post in July 2019. She became the society's vice president in 2020. In March 2021, she made history as the 177th president of the Law Society of England and Wales, the sixth woman, and the first person of colour to hold this position. She was the second in-house solicitor to become president in almost 50 years.

In May 2021, Boyce said that Priti Patel's plans to penalise asylum seekers who arrived in the United Kingdom by "so-called irregular routes" risked a "two-tier asylum system" in breach of international law and the Refugee Convention. After the Queen's Speech at the 2021 State Opening of Parliament announced government plans to limit judicial review in England and Wales, she said that the proposals "would allow unlawful acts by government or public bodies to be untouched or untouchable" and "risk taking power away from citizens".

== Membership ==
Boyce is a Fellow of King's College London, the RSA, the Society of Leadership Fellows, St George's House, Windsor Castle and the Chartered Governance Institute.

Boyce is the recipient of a number of awards. In 2020 she was voted onto the "Governance Hot 100 – Board Influencer" list.

In 2022, she received honorary doctorates of law from Keele University and the University of East London, as well as a Distinguished Alumna of the Year award from King's College London. That year, she also received the High Sheriff of Buckinghamshire Award for her leadership of the legal profession during the COVID-19 pandemic and for services to equality, diversity and inclusion.

In 2021, 2022 and 2023, Boyce was named in the Power List 100 Most Influential Black People in the UK, and she was the joint recipient of the 2022 Burberry British Diversity Awards-Inspirational Role Model of the Year

She also received a Lifetime Achievement Award in 2023 for her services to the legal profession. And her third honorary doctorate of law from the University of Law. The award recognised her achievements and contributions to the legal profession, including her leadership as the past president of the Law Society of England and Wales.

In 2024 she received a Lifetime Achievement Award from Justice News247 for her contribution to the legal world and the Paris Bar Medal, an award given to those who promote human rights and participate, through their action and life, to strengthen the rule of law by the Ordre des avocats de Paris. Boyce is also the recipient of the City of London Freedom Award. Most recently she received the Diamond Ladder Award, which she received at the inaugural "Be The Ladder" Awards 2025. The award recognises her significant contributions to the legal industry, specifically her work in promoting equality, diversity, and inclusion and ensuring that individuals from less privileged backgrounds have pathways to qualify in law.

Boyce was appointed a Commander of the Order of the British Empire (CBE) in the 2026 New Year Honours for services to the legal profession and to diversity, and to access to justice.

In January 2026 Boyce was awarded the Orientum Solem Award. Awarded to those who have broken barriers and contributed meaningfully to social discourse and societal thought.

In March 2026 she received her commission to take on the role as deputy lieutenant from the Countess Howe, HM Lord-Lieutenant of Buckinghamshire.

In September 2026 Boyce was recognised along with The Hon Justice Ayesha Malik who became the first woman appointed to Pakistan's Supreme Court, with the International Leaders/Lifetime Award at the Women in Law Initiative Justitia Awards 2026 in Vienna, Austria. The award honours women who have made an outstanding impact in leadership and recognises their lifelong achievements in the legal profession.
