= Matthew Taylor (footballer, born 1981) =

English footballer and coach

Matt Taylor
Personal information
- Full name: Matthew Simon Taylor
- Date of birth: 27 November 1981 (age 44)
- Place of birth: Oxford, England
- Height: 5 ft 10 in (1.78 m)
- Positions: Defender; midfielder

Youth career
- –1999: Luton Town

Senior career*
Years	Team	Apps	(Gls)
1999–2002	Luton Town	129	(16)
2002–2008	Portsmouth	178	(23)
2008–2011	Bolton Wanderers	123	(23)
2011–2014	West Ham United	76	(2)
2014–2016	Burnley	37	(4)
2016–2017	Northampton Town	44	(7)
2017–2019	Swindon Town	71	(9)
Total		658	(84)

International career
2002–2003	England U21	3	(0)

Managerial career
- 2018: Swindon Town (caretaker)
- 2021–2022: Walsall
- 2023–2024: Shrewsbury Town
- 2024–2025: Wealdstone
- 2025: Solihull Moors
- * Club domestic league appearances and goals

Matthew Simon Taylor (born 27 November 1981) is an English former professional footballer who played in the Premier League for Portsmouth, Bolton Wanderers, West Ham United and Burnley and in the Football League for Luton Town, Northampton Town and Swindon Town. Taylor played as a left winger, and also a right winger. He scored 84 goals in 658 league games in a 20-year career in English football.

Taylor began his coaching career while still a player at Swindon Town and, upon retiring from playing in 2019, he moved to Tottenham Hotspur to coach their U18s. He landed his first Football League management job in May 2021, taking over as head coach of Walsall. He was dismissed in February 2022 and hired at Shrewsbury Town in League One in June 2023. He was sacked in January 2024 and was later appointed manager of Wealdstone in May 2024.

== Club career ==
=== Luton Town ===
Taylor was born in Oxford, Oxfordshire. He began his career at Second Division Luton Town, making his debut as a 17-year-old at the beginning of the 1999–2000 season. He soon made the left wing-back slot his own and won the Luton Young Player of the Season award in his first ever season as a professional, before he won the Player of the Season award in 2000–01. However, despite having an excellent season, he couldn't prevent Luton being relegated to the Third Division. The 2001–02 season saw Luton win promotion as Third Division runners-up, with Taylor scoring 11 league goals and being named in the PFA Third Division Team of the Year.

=== Portsmouth ===
His displays led to interest from Premier League clubs, but he instead decided, in July 2002, to sign for First Division team Portsmouth for £750,000. The fee was set averting the need for a tribunal, causing Luton manager Joe Kinnear to lament: "at least Dick Turpin had the decency to wear a mask".

Usually playing as a left wing-back in a 3–5–2 formation, his speedy breaks down the left flank in support of the attack were a feature of Portsmouth's play as they won the First Division title in May 2003. As well as being a regular in the team during the season, he also scored seven goals in the League.

An injury picked up in the later stages of the previous season meant that Taylor was unavailable for the start of Portsmouth's first Premiership season. After returning to fitness, Taylor struggled to win his place in the side back due to the side's good early season form and Harry Redknapp's switch to the 4–4–2 formation. Taylor eventually won a place in the Pompey team at left back, where he was a regular in the second half of the 2003–04 season and appeared to be regaining form. Despite failing to score a league goal in his Premiership debut season, Taylor did hit the equaliser in an FA Cup tie at Anfield on 15 February 2004, when he ran the length of the pitch to celebrate with the supporters after a forceful right-footed finish at the Kop End.

Taylor's first Premiership goal came against Middlesbrough on 1 February 2005. The summer signing of David Unsworth from Everton meant Taylor only became a regular in the side in the second half of the season.

New manager Alain Perrin utilised Taylor as a left midfielder during the 2005–06 season. On 29 October 2005, he scored from 40 yards at Sunderland's Stadium of Light, winning the BBC Goal of the Month. Spotting the goalkeeper Kelvin Davis off his line, Taylor hit a dipping left-footed half-volley over Davis' head and into the back of the net. Portsmouth had been trailing Sunderland 1–0 in the crucial "six-pointer" but Taylor inspired a second half comeback with two goals and two assists in a 4–1 victory. When Harry Redknapp returned, Taylor initially retained his attacking role but the arrival of Andrés D'Alessandro on loan and Redknapp's disapproval of Perrin's left-back, Grégory Vignal, meant that Taylor returned to full-back for the latter stages of the season. In all he played 34 league games, scoring six goals. Two of these were crucial penalties in 2–1 victories; one in the last minute against Sunderland, and another in an away game at Wigan Athletic on 29 April 2006 to secure survival from relegation.

His good form for Portsmouth attracted interest from Tottenham Hotspur and Fulham, but he signed a long-term contract with Portsmouth in July 2006. In the 2006–07 season, Taylor was a regular in the Portsmouth side on the left of midfield. Despite the team's good form, it took until early December for him to score his first league goal, in a game against Aston Villa. He then added a second from the penalty spot in the same match before going on to score spectacular volleys in the next two games against Everton and Arsenal.

His first-half goal against Manchester United at Fratton Park in April 2007 sent Portsmouth on their way to a 2–1 victory over the Premier League champions. His final goal for Portsmouth was a penalty kick in August 2007, in a 3–1 win over Bolton Wanderers, the club he moved to five months later.

=== Bolton Wanderers ===
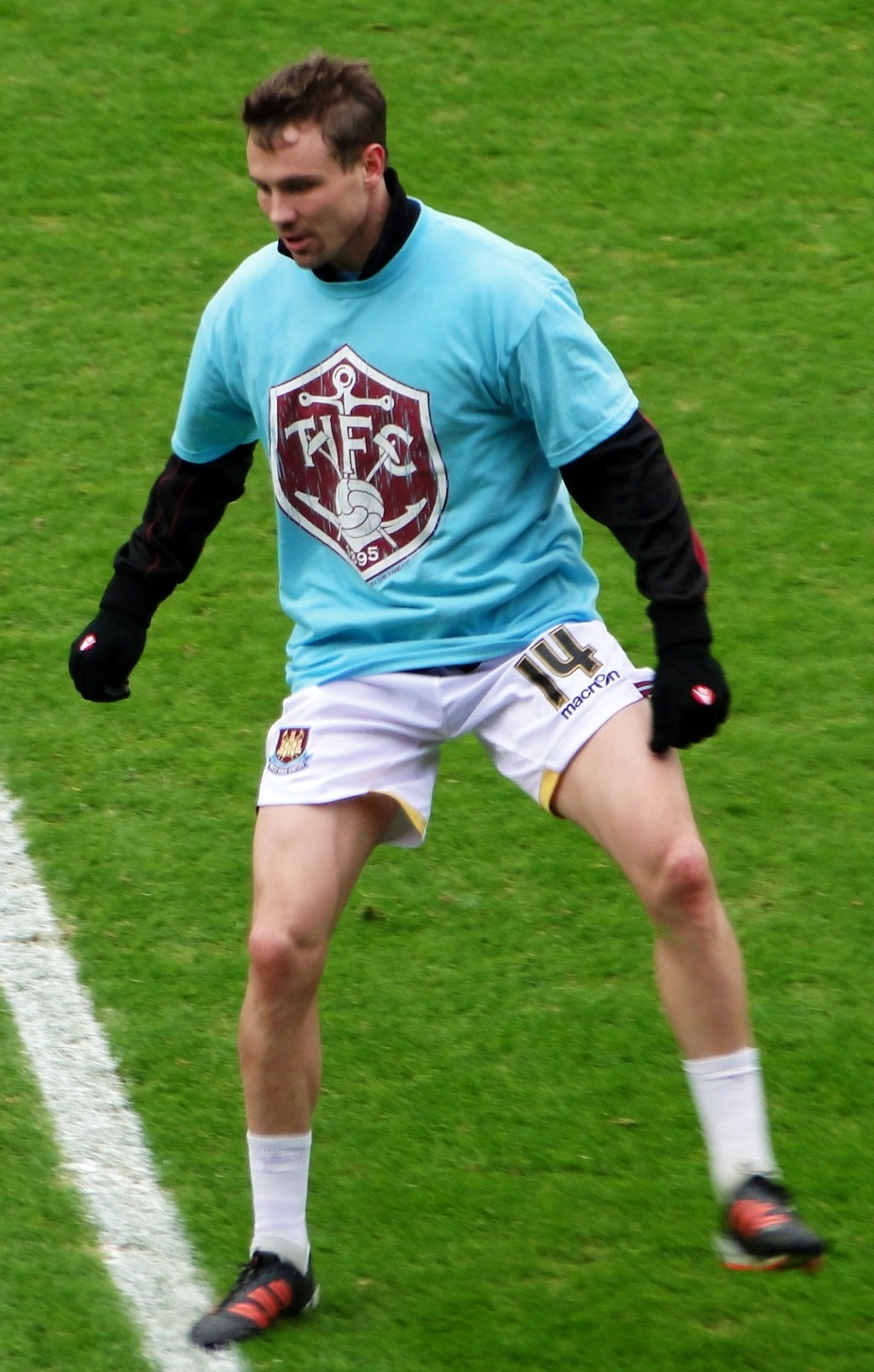
Taylor training with West Ham United in 2012

After losing his place in the Portsmouth team to Niko Kranjčar in the first half of the 2007–08 season, Taylor moved to Bolton Wanderers on 17 January 2008 for an undisclosed fee, after rejecting an offer from Sunderland. On 29 March 2008, Taylor scored his first goals for Bolton with a brace in the 3–2 home defeat to Arsenal. On 11 May 2008, Taylor scored his first away goal for Bolton with a last minute equaliser, gaining Bolton a 1–1 draw against Chelsea on the last day of the 2007–08 Premier League season. In July 2008, having previously worn number 32, Taylor was given the number 7 shirt previously worn by Stelios Giannakopoulos. Taylor scored the 50th goal of his career in a 3–1 win at West Ham United on 5 October 2008 and reached double figures in the league for the first time when scoring against Chelsea on 11 April 2009. In July 2009, he signed a new long-term contract at Bolton Wanderers. In the 2009–10 season, after the Blackburn Rovers game blood tests showed that Taylor had developed glandular fever.

=== West Ham United ===
On 23 July 2011, Taylor signed for West Ham United for an undisclosed fee on a three-year contract. He made his competitive debut on 7 August 2011 in 1–0 home defeat to Cardiff City and scored his first goal in West Ham's 4–3 win over his former club, Portsmouth, on 10 September.

=== Burnley ===
On 4 July 2014, newly promoted Premier League club Burnley confirmed that they had signed Taylor from West Ham United on a two-year deal, on a free transfer. Taylor played in Burnley's first three games of the 2014–15 season but sustained an Achilles' heel injury for which he underwent surgery in October 2014. Taylor returned to the first team on 11 April 2015, coming on as a late substitute in a 1–0 home defeat to Arsenal. In his third game back, he missed a penalty kick which would have put Burnley 1–0 up in an important game against Leicester City to avoid relegation from the Premier League. Leicester won the game 1–0 scoring 59 seconds after Taylor had missed his penalty.

Taylor was released by Burnley at the end of 2015–16 season after making 37 appearances, scoring four goals.

=== Northampton Town ===
On 1 August 2016, Taylor signed for newly promoted League One club Northampton Town on a one-year contract. He debuted on the opening day of 2016–17 in a 1–1 draw at home to Fleetwood Town. His first goal for Northampton came from a 20-yard free kick in a 3–2 victory at home to Milton Keynes Dons on 4 September, and this was followed up with a goal in the following match, a 2–0 win at home to Walsall. Taylor finished the season with 48 appearances and eight goals, and signed a one-year contract extension after a clause in his contract was triggered.

=== Swindon Town ===
On 22 August 2017, Taylor signed for League Two club Swindon Town on a one-year contract. Four days later, Taylor made his debut during Swindon's 3–0 home defeat against Crawley Town, replacing Amine Linganzi in the 53rd minute. On 22 September 2017, Taylor scored his first goal for Swindon in their 2–0 away victory over newly promoted Forest Green Rovers, doubling the visitors lead in the 91st minute.

On 6 June 2018, Taylor signed a new one-year deal with Swindon, agreeing to continue his player/coach role. In March 2019, Taylor announced his intention to retire from football at the end of the 2018–19 season.

== Coaching career ==
=== Early years ===
Taylor completed his coaching badges during his playing career and spent time working alongside Luton Town's under-15 and under-16 teams while at West Ham United.

Taylor was named interim manager at Swindon Town when David Flitcroft left for promotion rivals Mansfield Town on 1 March 2018. His sole game in charge on 9 March was a 3–0 home loss to Cheltenham Town. He transitioned into a player-coach role following the appointment of Phil Brown as manager.

Taylor was appointed head coach of Tottenham Hotspur Under-18s upon his retirement from football in 2019.

=== Walsall ===
On 19 May 2021, Taylor was appointed at League Two club Walsall, succeeding Brian Dutton at the turn of the month. After losing 1–0 on his debut at Tranmere Rovers on 7 August, he gained his first win by the same score at home to Stevenage on the fifth matchday, three weeks later. The Saddlers went unbeaten in October, winning and drawing an equal share of their six games; this earned Taylor a nomination for EFL League Two Manager of the Month, alongside the Exeter City manager of the same name.

Taylor was relieved of his duties at the club on 9 February 2022. The club had been approaching a play-off place before the turn of the year, but seven consecutive defeats left them four points above the relegation zone.

=== Shrewsbury Town ===
On 26 June 2023, Taylor was appointed head coach of League One club Shrewsbury Town on a contract of undisclosed length. He was their first appointee to bear the title head coach instead of manager, due to the creation of a director of football role for Micky Moore. Taylor, alongside assistant head coach Marcus Bignot, was relieved of his duties on 21 January 2024 after a poor run of seven defeats in eight games.

=== Wealdstone ===
On 10 May 2024, Taylor was appointed as First Team Manager of National League club Wealdstone.

=== Solihull Moors ===
On 23 January 2025, Taylor was appointed head coach of fellow National League side Solihull Moors. He left the club on 3 September 2025. During his time as manager, he oversaw just four wins in his 26 games in charge and had a winless start to the 2025–26 season.

== Career statistics ==
As of end of 2018–19 season

Appearances and goals by club, season and competition
Club	Season	League			FA Cup		League Cup		Other		Total	
Club	Season	Division	Apps	Goals	Apps	Goals	Apps	Goals	Apps	Goals	Apps	Goals
Luton Town	1999–2000	Second Division	41	4	5	1	1	0	0	0	47	5
Luton Town	2000–01	Second Division	45	1	4	0	4	0	1 (Note: Appearance in Football League Trophy)	0	54	1
Luton Town	2001–02	Third Division	43	11	1	0	1	0	0	0	45	11
Luton Town	Total		129	16	10	1	6	0	1	0	146	17
Portsmouth	2002–03	First Division	35	7	1	0	2	0	—		38	7
Portsmouth	2003–04	Premier League	30	0	5	3	3	1	—		38	4
Portsmouth	2004–05	Premier League	31	1	1	0	4	0	—		36	1
Portsmouth	2005–06	Premier League	34	6	2	0	1	1	—		37	7
Portsmouth	2006–07	Premier League	35	8	2	0	2	1	—		39	9
Portsmouth	2007–08	Premier League	13	1	0	0	2	0	—		15	1
Portsmouth	Total		178	23	11	3	14	3	—		203	29
Bolton Wanderers	2007–08	Premier League	16	3	—		—		3 (Note: Appearances in UEFA Cup)	0	19	3
Bolton Wanderers	2008–09	Premier League	34	10	1	0	0	0	—		35	10
Bolton Wanderers	2009–10	Premier League	37	8	3	0	3	0	—		43	8
Bolton Wanderers	2010–11	Premier League	36	2	4	0	2	0	—		42	2
Bolton Wanderers	Total		123	23	8	0	5	0	3	0	139	23
West Ham United	2011–12	Championship	28	1	0	0	1	0	3 (Note: Appearances in Championship play-offs)	0	32	1
West Ham United	2012–13	Premier League	28	1	2	0	2	0	—		32	1
West Ham United	2013–14	Premier League	20	0	0	0	6	1	—		26	1
West Ham United	Total		76	2	2	0	9	1	3	0	90	3
Burnley	2014–15	Premier League	10	0	0	0	1	0	—		11	0
Burnley	2015–16	Championship	27	4	0	0	1	0	—		28	4
Burnley	Total		37	4	0	0	2	0	—		39	4
Northampton Town	2016–17	League One	43	7	2	1	3	0	0	0	48	8
Northampton Town	2017–18	League One	1	0	—		0	0	—		1	0
Northampton Town	Total		44	7	2	1	3	0	0	0	49	8
Swindon Town	2017–18	League Two	38	6	2	1	—		1 (Note: Appearance in EFL Trophy)	0	41	7
Swindon Town	2018–19	League Two	33	3	1	0	1	0	0	0	35	3
Swindon Town	Total		71	9	3	1	1	0	1	0	76	10
Career total			658	84	36	6	40	4	8	0	742	94

== Managerial statistics ==
As of 2 September 2025

Managerial record by team and tenure
Team	From	To	Record					Ref.
Team	From	To	P	W	D	L	Win %	Ref.
Swindon Town (interim)	1 March 2018	12 March 2018	1	0	0	1	0.00	
Walsall	1 June 2021	9 February 2022	36	9	10	17	25.00	
Shrewsbury Town	26 June 2023	21 January 2024	35	12	4	19	34.29	
Wealdstone	10 May 2024	23 January 2025	33	9	10	14	27.27	
Solihull Moors	23 January 2025	2 September 2025	27	4	8	15	14.81	
Total			132	34	32	66	25.8	

== Honours ==
Portsmouth

- Football League First Division: 2002–03

West Ham United

- Football League Championship play-offs: 2012

Burnley

- Football League Championship: 2015–16

Individual

- Luton Town Young Player of the Season: 1999–2000
- Luton Town Player of the Season: 2000–01
- PFA Fans' Player of the Year: 2001–02 Second Division
- PFA Team of the Year: 2001–02 Third Division, 2002–03 First Division
- Swindon Town Player of the Season: 2017–18
