= Matthew Spring =

English footballer (born 1979)

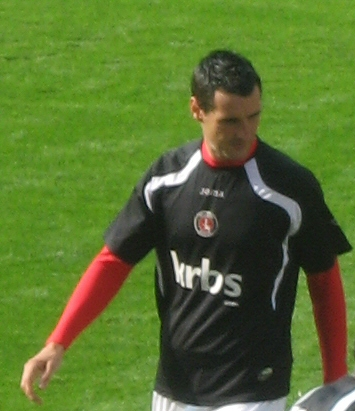
- Spring warming up for Charlton Athletic in 2009

Personal information
- Full name: Matthew John Spring
- Date of birth: 17 November 1979 (age 46)
- Place of birth: Harlow, England
- Height: 6 ft 0 in (1.83 m)
- Position: Midfielder

Youth career
- –1997: Luton Town

Senior career*
Years	Team	Apps	(Gls)
1997–2004	Luton Town	250	(26)
2004–2005	Leeds United	13	(1)
2005–2007	Watford	45	(8)
2007–2009	Luton Town	58	(10)
2008–2009	→ Sheffield United (loan)	11	(1)
2009–2010	Charlton Athletic	25	(2)
2010–2012	Leyton Orient	80	(6)
2012–2014	Wycombe Wanderers	30	(0)
2014–2015	St Neots Town	37	(0)
2015–2018	Hemel Hempstead Town	63	(5)
2017	Hitchin Town (dual registration)	2	(1)
2018	Hitchin Town (dual registration)	9	(0)
2018–2019	Hitchin Town	10	(0)
Total		633	(60)
- * Club domestic league appearances and goals as of 17:18, 24 January 2022 (UTC)

Matthew John Spring (born 17 November 1979) is an English semi-professional footballer and coach who last played as a midfielder for Southern League Premier Division Central club Hitchin Town. He previously played for Luton Town, Leeds United, Watford, Sheffield United, Charlton Athletic, Leyton Orient, Wycombe Wanderers, St Neots Town and Hemel Hempstead Town.

== Career ==
=== Luton Town ===
Spring started his career at Luton Town, making his debut as a half-time substitute in a 3–0 defeat to Bristol City on 27 September 1997. He went on to make 12 further appearances in the 1997–98 season. Spring established himself as a first-team regular in the 1998–99 season, making 54 appearances, scoring three goals. In the 2000–01 season, he made 51 appearances, scoring four goals, as Luton were relegated to the Third Division for the first time in 33 years. Luton bounced straight back in the 2001–02 season, finishing runners-up and were promoted back to the Second Division, with Spring making 43 appearances, scoring six goals. Spring was beset by injuries during the latter half of the 2003–04 season, causing him to miss the last three months of the season, restricting him to 30 appearances, scoring one goal. Spring's contract was due to expire at the end of the season and he looked set to leave Luton, with Championship clubs Nottingham Forest and Leeds United both interested in securing his services. In total he made 289 appearances for Luton, scoring 30 goals.

=== Leeds United ===
After leaving Luton, Spring was on the verge of joining Nottingham Forest and linking back up with former Luton manager Joe Kinnear until Leeds made a late bid to sign him. He was signed by newly appointed Leeds manager Kevin Blackwell on a Bosman transfer, as he re-modelled his newly relegated team. Spring described the turn of events as "a bit of a shock because I was lined up to go to Forest and I was pleased with that. Then a couple of days later Leeds came in with an offer. I had a decision to make but as soon as I saw Elland Road and thought about the atmosphere of 35,000 fans at every home game my mind was made up." Spring's first season in the Championship was an unhappy one, with a combination of injuries and personal problems restricting him to just 15 appearances and one goal against Ipswich Town.

=== Watford ===
As the 2005–06 season commenced Watford manager Adrian Boothroyd, who had worked with Spring when he was first team coach at Leeds, brought the midfielder to Vicarage Road to be part of his reshaped team for a transfer fee of £150,000. Spring scored on his debut, coming off the bench to put in a late third in a 3–1 victory over Burnley on 20 August 2005. As Boothroyd's team flew high in the Championship, Spring, a regular in the team, scored seven further goals from central midfield by the end of January. However, he did not score again until Watford reached the play-offs in May, when he scored the third goal in the 3–0 victory over Crystal Palace in the first leg of the semi-final. Spring played in the 3–0 Championship play-off final win over Leeds United at the Millennium Stadium, with Watford earning promotion to the Premier League.

During Watford's Premiership campaign, Spring's first team opportunities were limited after falling down the pecking order behind new signing Damien Francis and Al Bangura at Vicarage Road. As a result, he made only nine appearances for the club during the first half of the 2006–07 season.

=== Return to Luton Town ===
On 18 January 2007, after struggling to establish himself in the first team at Watford, Spring rejoined Luton on a two-and-a-half-year contract for a transfer fee of £200,000 (rising to £300,000). His first game since returning to the club came on 30 January in the 1–0 away defeat to Coventry City. At the end of the season, Luton were relegated to League One after two seasons in the Championship, with Spring making 14 appearances, scoring one goal. During the 2007–08 season, Spring made 54 appearances, scoring 12 goals, as Luton were relegated again to League Two.

=== Sheffield United (loan) ===
On 31 July 2008, Spring joined Championship club Sheffield United on a season-long loan deal, with a view to a permanent move. He made his debut for the club on 13 August in the first round of the League Cup, a 3–1 victory at home over Port Vale. Injuries initially hampered his time at Bramall Lane, but by October, he began to feature regularly for the first team, scoring his first goal for the club on 25 November, a 3–1 defeat at home to Wolverhampton Wanderers.

On 9 January 2009, Spring's loan deal was terminated by Sheffield United to allow him to seek a permanent move elsewhere, as agreed before the loan commenced.

=== Charlton Athletic ===
On 9 January 2009, Spring joined Championship club Charlton Athletic from Luton on an 18-month contract for an undisclosed fee. He scored his first goal for the club on 17 January, a 4–1 away defeat to Sheffield Wednesday. He scored his second goal just ten days later in a 1–0 win over rivals Crystal Palace in only his third game for his new employers. Spring finished the 2008–09 season making 13 appearances, scoring two goals, as Charlton were relegated to League One.

Spring failed to score in 15 appearances for Charlton during the 2009–10 season. Charlton chose not to offer Spring a new contract and so he left the club at the end of the season.

=== Leyton Orient ===
On 30 June 2010, Spring signed a two-year contract with League One club Leyton Orient. He made his debut for the club on 7 August, a 2–1 defeat away to Yeovil Town. Spring scored his first goal for Leyton Orient in a 3–2 defeat away to Notts County. He finished the 2010–11 season making 50 appearances, scoring two goals.

During the 2011–12 season, Spring scored his first goal on 12 November 2011, a 3–0 win over Bromley in the FA Cup. He scored his first league goal of the season on 31 December, a 1–0 win over his former employers and League One leaders Charlton. He finished the season making 45 appearances, scoring five goals. Spring was not offered a new contract by Leyton Orient and left the club at the end of the season.

=== Wycombe Wanderers ===
On 2 July 2012, it was announced that Spring had signed a two-year contract with Wycombe Wanderers. He arrived as one of five new signings after a transfer embargo was lifted from the club. Spring made his debut for the club on 11 August, a 1–0 away defeat to former club Watford. His first and only goal for Wycombe during the 2012–13 season came on 3 November, a 4–1 away defeat to Crewe Alexandra in the FA Cup. Spring ended the season making 29 appearances for Wycombe.

Spring made only eight appearances for Wycombe during the 2013–14 season, failing to score in any of them. He was among a number of players released at the end of the season having fallen out of favour with Gareth Ainsworth.

=== St Neots Town ===
Following his release by Wycombe Wanderers, Spring signed for Southern League Premier Division club St Neots Town in August 2014.

After a re-shuffle of the coaching staff early in the 2014–15 season, Spring was appointed player-assistant manager.

Despite playing an important role in the St Neots Town team that made the Southern Premier Division play-off final, Spring was one of several players released by the club at the end of the 2014–15 season.

=== Hemel Hempstead Town and Hitchin Town ===
After his release from St Neots Town, Spring moved up a division to sign with National League South club Hemel Hempstead Town in June 2015.

Spring signed a dual registration deal with Southern League Premier Division club Hitchin Town on 6 March 2017, scoring on his debut later that day in a 2–1 victory at home to Cirencester Town, having entered the match as a substitute. He re-signed for Hitchin on dual registration on 23 March 2018. Spring signed for Hitchin permanently as a player-coach on 24 May on a one-year contract.

== Rivalry ==
Spring is one of the few players to have played for both Luton and their arch-rivals Watford. On 10 September 2002, he scored a 30-yard goal for Luton in a 2–1 victory over Watford in the League Cup, the first meeting of the two clubs for over three years.

== Career statistics ==
As of match played 21 November 2018

Appearances and goals by club, season and competition
Club	Season	League			FA Cup		League Cup		Other		Total	
Club	Season	Division	Apps	Goals	Apps	Goals	Apps	Goals	Apps	Goals	Apps	Goals
Luton Town	1997–98	Second Division	12	0	1	0	0	0	0	0	13	0
Luton Town	1998–99	Second Division	45	3	2	0	7	0	0	0	54	3
Luton Town	1999–2000	Second Division	45	6	5	2	1	0	1 (Note: Appearance(s) in Football League Trophy)	0	52	8
Luton Town	2000–01	Second Division	41	4	5	0	4	0	1	0	51	4
Luton Town	2001–02	Third Division	42	6	1	0	0	0	0	0	43	6
Luton Town	2002–03	Second Division	41	6	2	1	2	1	1	0	46	8
Luton Town	2003–04	Second Division	24	1	3	0	2	0	1	0	30	1
Luton Town	Total		250	26	19	3	16	1	4	0	289	30
Leeds United	2004–05	Championship	13	1	0	0	2	0	—		15	1
Watford	2005–06	Championship	39	8	0	0	2	0	3 (Note: Appearances in Championship play-offs)	1	44	9
Watford	2006–07	Premier League	6	0	0	0	3	0	—		9	0
Watford	Total		45	8	0	0	5	0	3	1	53	9
Luton Town	2006–07	Championship	14	1	0	0	—		—		14	1
Luton Town	2007–08	League One	44	9	5	0	4	2	1	1	54	12
Luton Town	Total		58	10	5	0	4	2	1	1	68	13
Sheffield United (loan)	2008–09	Championship	11	1	—		2	0	—		13	1
Charlton Athletic	2008–09	Championship	13	2	—		—		—		13	2
Charlton Athletic	2009–10	League One	12	0	0	0	1	0	2	0	15	0
Charlton Athletic	Total		25	2	0	0	1	0	2	0	28	2
Leyton Orient	2010–11	League One	39	2	7	0	2	0	2	0	50	2
Leyton Orient	2011–12	League One	41	4	2	1	2	0	0	0	45	5
Leyton Orient	Total		80	6	9	1	4	0	2	0	95	7
Wycombe Wanderers	2012–13	League Two	25	0	1	1	1	0	2	0	29	1
Wycombe Wanderers	2013–14	League Two	5	0	1	0	1	0	1	0	8	0
Wycombe Wanderers	Total		30	0	2	1	2	0	3	0	37	1
St Neots Town	2014–15	Southern League Premier Division	37	0	2	0	—		8 (Note: Two appearances in Southern League Premier Division play-offs, four appearances and one goal in FA Trophy, one appearance in Hunts Senior Cup, one in Southern League Cup)	1	47	1
Hemel Hempstead Town	2015–16	National League South	31	5	2	0	—		3 (Note: One appearance in Herts Charity Cup, one in FA Trophy, one in Herts Senior Cup)	0	36	5
Hemel Hempstead Town	2016–17	National League South	15	0	0	0	—		0	0	15	0
Hemel Hempstead Town	2017–18	National League South	17	0	3	0	—		4 (Note: One appearance in Herts Senior Cup, one appearance and one goal in Herts Charity Cup, two appearances in FA Trophy)	1	24	1
Hemel Hempstead Town	Total		63	5	5	0	—		7	1	75	6
Hitchin Town	2016–17	Southern League Premier Division	2	1	—		—		1 (Note: Appearance in Herts Charity Cup)	0	3	1
Hitchin Town	2017–18	Southern League Premier Division	9	0	—		—		1 (Note: Appearance in Southern League Cup)	0	10	0
Hitchin Town	2018–19	Southern League Premier Division Central	10	0	7	0	—		3 (Note: One appearance in Herts Charity Cup, one in Southern League Cup, one in FA Trophy)	0	20	0
Hitchin Town	Total		21	1	7	0	—		5	0	33	1
Career total			633	60	49	5	36	3	35	4	753	72

== Honours ==
Luton Town

- Football League Third Division runner-up: 2001–02

Watford

- Football League Championship play-offs: 2006

Individual

- Luton Town Young Player of the Season: 1997–98
