= Gary Doherty =

Irish footballer (born 1980)

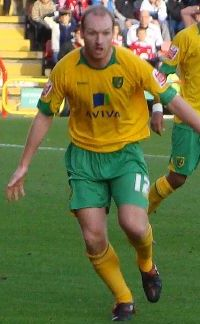
- Doherty playing for Norwich City in 2008

Personal information
- Full name: Gary Michael Thomas Doherty
- Date of birth: 31 January 1980 (age 46)
- Place of birth: Carndonagh, Ireland
- Height: 6 ft 2 in (1.88 m)
- Positions: Defender; forward

Youth career
- ?–1997: Luton Town

Senior career*
Years	Team	Apps	(Gls)
1997–2000	Luton Town	70	(12)
2000–2004	Tottenham Hotspur	64	(4)
2004–2010	Norwich City	202	(12)
2010–2012	Charlton Athletic	41	(0)
2012	→ Wycombe Wanderers (loan)	13	(1)
2012–2014	Wycombe Wanderers	43	(2)
Total		433	(31)

International career
2000–2005	Republic of Ireland	34	(4)
- * Club domestic league appearances and goals

Gary Michael Thomas Doherty (born 31 January 1980) is an Irish former professional footballer who played as a defender, having previously also played as a forward. He gained international honours for the Republic of Ireland.

He began his career at Luton Town before having a spell with Tottenham Hotspur in the Premier League, however, most of his career was with Norwich City, for whom he won the player of the year award. He finished his career with Wycombe Wanderers.

== Club career ==
=== Luton Town ===
Doherty started his league career with Luton Town in 1997. He made 88 appearances in total over less than three seasons with the Hatters and became a Republic of Ireland international.

=== Tottenham Hotspur ===
Doherty was bought by Luton old boy David Pleat then Director of Football at Tottenham Hotspur for £1million in March 2000. He made his Spurs debut as a substitute in a 3–1 defeat at Manchester United in May 2000. He played in the team regularly during the 2000–01 season and scored his first goal against Newcastle United on 2 January 2001. Other highlights that season include a late winner against Leyton Orient in the FA Cup, giving his team the lead against North London rivals Arsenal in the 2001 FA Cup semi final. and scoring twice as Spurs came back from 2–0 down away to Sunderland to win 3–2. However, the following season started badly when he broke his leg in a League Cup match against Torquay United in September following a challenge from Eifion Williams. He returned before the end of the season but found it hard to break back into the side.

At Tottenham, Doherty eventually settled into a defensive role, and although he enjoyed probably his best spell after the turn of the year in 2003–04, he did not manage to consistently reach the form he exhibited before breaking his leg. Doherty signed a new contract of undisclosed length in March 2004. He was eventually sold by Tottenham's new management team of Frank Arnesen and Jacques Santini at the start of the 2004–05 season to newly promoted Norwich City for an undisclosed fee.

=== Norwich City ===
At Norwich City Doherty's career started well, with him having a regular place at the heart of the defence, but he lost his place in February to Jason Shackell and Norwich were eventually relegated. The following season, however, saw Doherty established as a regular choice at centre-back and his form and consistency improved considerably. Although Norwich had a difficult and disappointing 2005–06 season, the supporters recognised Doherty's contribution by voting him Norwich City player of the year.

Doherty signed a new contract at Carrow Road until summer 2008. The 2007–08 season also started off poorly for Doherty and was injured for 2 months in October. Doherty's contract expired, but he signed a new two-year deal on 1 July. He subsequently announced that his new squad number, 12, instead of 27 is intended to bring him luck:

"It's all about superstition. Since I came to Norwich, my goal tally's been rubbish really. I used to wear 12 at Luton and Tottenham, and I used to be quite free-scoring during those times."

During the Canaries' 2008–09 pre-season tour, Doherty picked up an ankle injury that ruled him out for the first three months of the season. Having returned to the side, he scored his first league goal for more than three years on Boxing Day 2008 in a 3–1 defeat to Crystal Palace at Selhurst Park.

Although Doherty was given the captaincy at the start of the 2009–10 season by Bryan Gunn, new manager Paul Lambert dropped him from the role immediately; and he was told he had no long-term future at the club. However, due to injuries Lambert was forced to recall Doherty to the side, and after this Doherty remained in the side for the rest of the season. He formed tight defensive partnerships with both Michael Nelson and Jens Berthel Askou and also scored seven goals in the process helping Norwich City to the League one title.

Doherty was named "man of the match" following Norwich's game against Leeds United on 27 March 2010.

At the end of the 2009–10 season, Doherty was named third in the player of the season award list, but on 14 May 2010 it was announced that he had been released by Norwich City. His agent Brendan Keyes was in talks with New York Red Bulls to bring Gary to MLS and a deal looked imminent but with terms not agreed Doherty stayed in England.

=== Charlton Athletic ===
On 5 July 2010, it was announced that Doherty had signed for Charlton Athletic after being released on a free transfer from Norwich City. Doherty became a regular in the Charlton side during the 2010–11 season but only made three appearances for the club in the 2011–12 season.

=== Wycombe Wanderers (loan) ===
On 24 February 2012, Doherty moved alongside Charlton teammate Paul Hayes to Wycombe Wanderers, who at the time, sat bottom of League 1. He was one of four new loanees that featured in the 5–0 win over Hartlepool. Doherty scored in the game to cap an impressive debut. He was later awarded with the Sponsor's Man of the Match.

=== Wycombe Wanderers ===
On 3 July 2012, Doherty signed for Wycombe Wanderers on a two-year contract after being released from Charlton. On 9 July 2012, Doherty was given the captain's armband. After two seasons with Wycombe, Doherty was forced to retire due to a knee injury sustained in the 2014–15 pre season.

== International career ==
Doherty moved with his family to Luton in England at the age of six, but he came through the youth system of his native country, playing for the Republic of Ireland national under-19 football team in the 1997 UEFA European Under-18 Football Championship finals in Iceland scoring against France. He was also part of the UEFA Under-18 Championship winning side in 1998, and the Under-20 side that got to the last 16 of the 1999 FIFA World Youth Championship.

Doherty primarily played as a forward for his country, making his international debut against Greece in April 2000. He was becoming a regular in the squad when he broke his leg in September 2001. He recovered in April 2002, scoring his first international goal against the United States, but he missed out on the squad for the 2002 FIFA World Cup finals. Doherty returned to the team for Ireland's unsuccessful Euro 2004 qualifying campaign, where he top scored with three goals. He played centre half numerous times for Ireland

== In popular culture ==
Doherty is affectionately known by many fans as either "The Doc" or "Ginger Pelé" (which was immortalised by the publication of the football song/chants book: One Ginger Pele).

The 2010 song "Gary Doherty", by Norwich band We Can't Dance, makes reference to newspapers giving Doherty a hard time and has a chorus consisting of his name, ending with the line "I don't care what they say about you anyway".

== Career statistics ==
=== Club ===
Appearances and goals by club, season and competition
Club	Season	League			FA Cup		League Cup		Other		Total	
Club	Season	Division	Apps	Goals	Apps	Goals	Apps	Goals	Apps	Goals	Apps	Goals
Luton Town	1997–98	Second Division	10	0	1	0	0	0	0	0	11	0
Luton Town	1998–99	Second Division	20	6	2	0	1	0	1 (Note: Appearance(s) in Football League Trophy)	0	24	6
Luton Town	1999–2000	Second Division	40	6	5	2	2	1	1	0	48	9
Luton Town	Total		70	12	8	2	3	1	2	0	83	15
Tottenham Hotspur	1999–2000	Premier League	2	0	0	0	0	0	0	0	2	0
Tottenham Hotspur	2000–01	Premier League	22	3	5	3	0	0	0	0	27	6
Tottenham Hotspur	2001–02	Premier League	7	0	0	0	1	0	0	0	8	0
Tottenham Hotspur	2002–03	Premier League	15	1	1	0	2	0	0	0	18	1
Tottenham Hotspur	2003–04	Premier League	17	0	2	1	3	0	0	0	22	1
Tottenham Hotspur	2004–05	Premier League	1	0	0	0	0	0	0	0	1	0
Tottenham Hotspur	Total		64	4	8	4	6	0	0	0	78	8
Norwich City	2004–05	Premier League	20	2	1	0	2	0	0	0	23	2
Norwich City	2005–06	Championship	42	1	1	0	3	0	0	0	46	1
Norwich City	2006–07	Championship	34	0	3	0	2	0	0	0	39	0
Norwich City	2007–08	Championship	34	0	2	1	3	0	0	0	39	1
Norwich City	2008–09	Championship	34	3	2	0	0	0	0	0	36	3
Norwich City	2009–10	League One	38	6	2	0	2	0	2	1	44	7
Norwich City	Total		202	12	11	1	12	0	2	1	227	14
Charlton Athletic	2010–11	League One	38	0	4	0	1	0	3	0	46	0
Charlton Athletic	2011–12	League One	3	0	0	0	2	0	1	0	6	0
Charlton Athletic	Total		41	0	4	0	3	0	4	0	52	0
Wycombe Wanderers (loan)	2011–12	League One	13	1	0	0	0	0	0	0	13	1
Wycombe Wanderers	2012–13	League Two	23	2	1	0	1	0	0	0	25	2
Wycombe Wanderers	2013–14	League Two	20	0	1	1	0	0	1	0	22	1
Wycombe Wanderers	Total		43	2	2	1	1	0	1	0	47	3
Career total			433	31	33	8	25	1	9	1	500	41

=== International ===
Appearances and goals by national team and year
National team	Year	Apps	Goals
Republic of Ireland	2000	3	0
Republic of Ireland	2001	5	0
Republic of Ireland	2002	5	2
Republic of Ireland	2003	9	2
Republic of Ireland	2004	6	0
Republic of Ireland	2005	5	0
Total		33	4

Scores and results list Republic of Ireland's goal tally first, score column indicates score after each Doherty goal.

List of international goals scored by Gary Doherty
No.	Date	Venue	Opponent	Score	Result	Competition	Ref.
1	17 April 2002	Lansdowne Road, Dublin, Republic of Ireland	United States	2–1	2–1	Friendly	
2	7 September 2002	Lokomotiv Stadium, Moscow, Russia	Russia	1–2	2–4	UEFA Euro 2004 qualifying	
3	29 March 2003	Lokomotivi Stadium, Tbilisi, Georgia	Georgia	2–1	2–1	UEFA Euro 2004 qualifying	
4	11 June 2003	Lansdowne Road, Dublin, Republic of Ireland	Georgia	1–0	2–0	UEFA Euro 2004 qualifying	

== Honours ==
Norwich City

- Football League One: 2009–10

Individual

- PFA Team of the Year: 2009–10 League One
- Norwich City Player of the Year: 2006
