= Scott Ward =

English footballer

Personal information
- Full name: Scott James Ward
- Date of birth: 5 October 1981 (age 45)
- Place of birth: Brent, London, England
- Position: Goalkeeper

Senior career*
Years	Team	Apps	(Gls)
1999–2002	Luton Town	1	(0)
2001	→ Boreham Wood (loan)	1	(0)
2002	Chesham United	?	(?)
2002–2003	Grays Athletic	4	(0)
2003–2004	Dulwich Hamlet	?	(?)
2004	Margate	4	(0)
2004–2006	Crawley Town	4	(0)
2004–2005	→ Lewes (loan)	18	(0)
2006–2007	London Colney	?	(?)
2006-2007	Coventry City	0	(0)
Total		33	(0)
- * Club domestic league appearances and goals

Scott James Ward (born 5 October 1981) in the London Borough of Brent, is an English former professional footballer who played as a goalkeeper for Luton Town in the Football League. Ward signed professional terms for Luton Town on his 17th birthday and while making his first team debut saved a penalty with his first touch in League football against Brentford. He had several periods in and out of the professional game, which involved a time at Plymouth Argyle.

He is the brother of professional footballers Darren and Elliott Ward.
