= Andre Scarlett =

English footballer

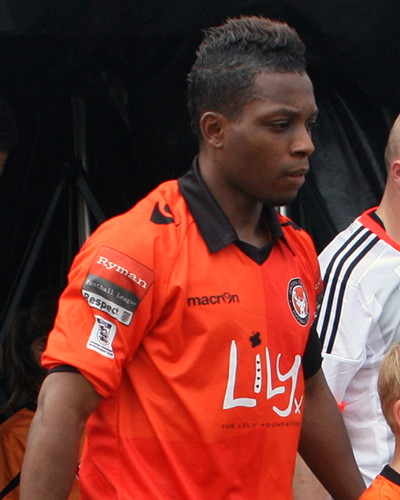
- Scarlett in action for Walton Casuals in 2014

Personal information
- Date of birth: 11 January 1980 (age 46)
- Place of birth: Brent, London, England
- Height: 5 ft 4 in (1.63 m)
- Position: Midfielder

Team information
- Current team: Hanworth Villa

Senior career*
Years	Team	Apps	(Gls)
1998–2001	Luton Town	18	(1)
2001	Chelmsford City	3	(0)
2001–2002	Stevenage Borough	0	(0)
2002	Hitchin Town	0	(0)
2002–2005	Chesham United		
2005–2012	Staines Town		
2012	St Albans City	1	(0)
2012	Metropolitan Police		
2012	Chipstead		
2012–2013	Wingate & Finchley		
2013–2014	Walton & Hersham		
2014	Walton Casuals		
2014–2016	Walton & Hersham		
2016–	Westfield		
2019–	Hanworth Villa		
- * Club domestic league appearances and goals

Andre Scarlett (born 11 January 1980) is an English footballer who plays for Hanworth Villa. As well as operating in central midfield Scarlett is as equally comfortable playing right full back. He began his career in the Football League with Luton Town.

== Early career ==
Scarlett originally joined Staines Town in December 2005 upon his release from Chesham United. Later he had spells with St Albans City (one appearance in October 2012), Metropolitan Police and Chipstead.

== Later career ==
In late 2012 he joined Wingate & Finchley of the Isthmian League, but was not retained the following season, and joined Walton & Hersham at the beginning of the 2013–14 season. His next stop was Walton Casuals, before returning to Walton & Hersham in August. From the 2016–17 season he played for Westfield.

He registered as a player for Hanworth Villa in January 2019, after recently being included in newly appointed Louis Carder Walcott's management team.
