= Andrew Fotiadis =

English footballer

Personal information
- Full name: Panos Andrew Fotiadis
- Date of birth: 6 September 1977 (age 49)
- Place of birth: Hitchin, England
- Height: 5 ft 11 in (1.80 m)
- Position: Striker

Youth career
- ?–1995: Luton Town

Senior career*
| Years | Team | Apps | (Gls) |
| 1995–2003 | Luton Town | 123 | (18) |
| 2003 | → Peterborough United (loan) | 1 | (0) |
| 2003–2004 | Peterborough United | 18 | (2) |
| 2004 | → Heybridge Swifts (loan) | 5 | (2) |
- * Club domestic league appearances and goals

Panos Andrew Fotiadis (born 6 September 1977, in Hitchin) is an English former footballer, best known for his time at Luton Town, who retired from the professional game after a succession of injuries.

== Club career ==
Fotiadis started his career with Luton Town, signing his first professional deal in August 1995. A year later he was brought into the first team for the 1996–97 season by Lennie Lawrence, and scored his first goal with a lob against Walsall on 5 October. 1997–98 was a disappointment following the successes of his first season, as he spent a long time on the sidelines. However, the end of the season saw Fotiadis given a new one-year contract.

1998–99 was another poor season for Fotiadis, as he was regularly injured and only scored three goals all season. However, he was once again given a one-year contract 1999–00 was no better, as after finding the net twice early on he faded, and spent the majority of yet another season injured. However, Luton renewed his deal for another year.

Fotiadis started the 2000–01 campaign in the starting lineup, and showed some fine form which saw him touted for a call-up for Cyprus. An injury at Millwall once more held Fotiadis back, though Joe Kinnear handed him a two-year deal at the end of the season.

However, Fotiadis was now little more than a squad player. He did not start a single League game during 2001–02, and 2002–03 did not give him much more time on the pitch. By February 2003, he was on trial at Bristol Rovers, who turned him down. Kinnear sent him out on loan to Peterborough United soon after, and Posh bought him permanently days later.

Fotiadis scored on his debut, but found it tough at London Road. Only a year later, in March 2004, he was loaned out to Heybridge Swifts, where he scored two goals in five games before rupturing his knee ligaments. Peterborough released him soon after, and he retired from the professional game.

== International career ==
Fotiadis was born in England and was of Greek-Cypriot descent. He won caps for the England under-15 and under-18 teams, and was once considered to play at full level for Cyprus. However, he was never given a cap by either.
