= Gavin McGowan =

English footballer

Personal information
- Full name: Gavin Gregory McGowan
- Date of birth: 16 January 1976 (age 50)
- Place of birth: Blackheath, London, England
- Position: Defender

Senior career*
Years	Team	Apps	(Gls)
1992–1998	Arsenal	7	(0)
1997	→ Luton Town (loan)	2	(0)
1997	→ Luton Town (loan)	8	(0)
1998–2001	Luton Town	50	(0)
Total		67	(0)
- * Club domestic league appearances and goals

Gavin Gregory McGowan (born 16 January 1976) is an English retired professional footballer who played as a defender. McGowan featured for Arsenal in the Premier League and for Luton Town in the Football League Second Division.

== Career ==
McGowan was born in Blackheath, England. He joined Arsenal's youth team in 1992 at the age of 16. In 1994, he won the FA Youth Cup with Arsenal when they beat Millwall 5–3 in the final. He only played one game against Crystal Palace as Arsenal won the 1997–98 FA Premier League, meaning he did not qualify for a winners' medal. In all McGowan made seven appearances for Arsenal with six caps coming in the Premier League, and one in the FA Cup for the London side.

Unable to win a first-team place at Arsenal, McGowan moved to Luton Town in the summer of 1998, having already spent two periods on loan there. McGowan was initially a first-team player but an injury during the 1999–2000 season limited his appearances. He left the club on a free transfer in 2002 after a clearout by then recently employed manager Joe Kinnear.

== Personal life ==
After retiring from Football, McGowan attended Greenwich University where he studied as a PE Teacher passing with BA Honours. McGowan joined Orchard Park High School in 2007 in the borough of Croydon. He was Head of Football at King's College School in Wimbledon. McGowan is a qualified UEFA B coach. He is now Director of Sport and Assistant Principal at Ravensbourne school in Bromley.

== Honours ==
Arsenal

- FA Youth Cup: 1993–94
