= Liam George =

Footballer (born 1979)

Personal information
- Full name: Liam Brendan George
- Date of birth: 2 February 1979 (age 47)
- Place of birth: Luton, England
- Position: Striker

Team information
- Current team: Barton Rovers

Youth career
- Luton Town

Senior career*
Years	Team	Apps	(Gls)
1996–2001	Luton Town	102	(20)
2002	Clydebank	2	(0)
2002	Stevenage Borough	4	(0)
2002–2003	Bury	8	(1)
2003	Boston United	3	(0)
2003	St. Patrick's Athletic	7	(0)
2003–2004	York City	22	(3)
2004–2005	Grays Athletic	6	(4)
2005	→ St Albans City (loan)	2	(0)
2005	Stotfold	2	(0)
2005–2006	Dunstable Town	3	(0)
2006	AFC Wimbledon	9	(1)
2006	Atlanta Silverbacks	22	(3)
2006	Chesham United	3	(0)
2006–2007	Eastleigh	5	(0)
2007	Hyde United	1	(0)
2007	FC United of Manchester	4	(0)
2007–2008	Barton Rovers	14	(3)
2008–2009	Hitchin Town	13	(1)
2009–2010	Arlesey Town	?	(0)
2010–	Barton Rovers		

International career
	Republic of Ireland U21	4	(0)
- * Club domestic league appearances and goals as of 15 November 2007

Liam Brendan George (born 2 February 1979) is a footballer who plays for Barton Rovers on a part-time basis, having signed for them in 2010. Born in England, he represented the Republic of Ireland in the Under 18 European Youth Championship.

== Career ==
=== Early career ===
George was born in Luton, England. His family originates from Saint Lucia (father, Victor) and Church Street, Dublin (mother, Anne). He grew up on Luton's Marsh Farm housing estate and attended Cardinal Newman Catholic School.

George started his career in football progressing through the youth ranks at Luton Town. He represented his country, Ireland, at all youth levels. His career took him from an Under 18 European Youth Championship winner with Ireland to the USL in America within eight years.

Having broken into the Irish youth teams with the likes of Robbie Keane, Richard Dunne and Stephen McPhail, George progressed through the Irish youth teams and the Luton Town reserve team. In July 1998 he represented the Republic of Ireland in the 1998 UEFA European Under-18 Championship, reaching the final against Germany. The game went to penalties and, with the score at 3–3, George slotted home the winner to make it 4–3.

=== Luton Town ===
George's debut with Luton Town came in the 1997–98 season with a 3–0 defeat to Bristol City, however playing time was limited throughout the season's duration. The following season showed more promise and George started as a first team regular, although a broken leg prevented him from playing past the summer months. The 1999–2000 season was a greater success for George, bagging 16 goals. Luton were relegated the following year with George managing seven league goals, two cup goals. Luton were in the Third Division (now Football League Two) for the first time in over 30 years and George stayed at the club on a weekly contract basis. However Luton manager Joe Kinnear purchased a number of players and George struggled to hold down a starting position.

=== Later career ===
Unsuccessful trials at Leyton Orient, Sheffield United and Gillingham led George to Stevenage Borough. However, after three months at the Conference club with his ex-Luton assistant manager, Wayne Turner, George moved onto Bury on a three-month contract at the start of the following season. Before the end of the 2002–03 season, George had turned out for Boston United and St. Patrick's Athletic. York City signed George after a successful trial ahead of the 2003–04 season, however another injury meant George spent more time on the treatment table and York were relegated that year. York manager, Chris Brass did not offer him a new contract and therefore another move was on the cards, this time to Grays Athletic. Before signing for USL First Division side the Atlanta Silverbacks in March 2006, George kitted out for Dunstable Town and AFC Wimbledon.

A far cry from the international success at under-18 level, George found himself thousands of miles from home playing in the United Soccer League, the second division of US soccer, the top tier being Major League Soccer. George scored three goals in 22 games for the Silverbacks before returning to England with Chesham United in November 2006, signing non-contract terms to be able to play competitive football. January 2007 saw him move to Eastleigh again on non-contract terms. This was followed by spells with Hyde United and FC United of Manchester, whom he left in October 2007. George went on to sign for Barton Rovers before he signed for Darran Hay's Hitchin Town in December 2008. After a short spell with Arlesey Town, George rejoined Barton Rovers in 2010.

== Managerial career ==
George entered management by joining St Neots Town as an assistant manager in September 2014.

== Injuries ==
In August 1998, George suffered a fracture-dislocation of his left ankle following a challenge from Wigan Athletic defender Scott Green. A failed medical in November 2001 saw a move to Colchester United fall through of which he was never given a reason behind the failure. During the 2003–2004 season, George's season was cut short through shin splints of his right calf. He was again injured in the 2004–2005 season with patella tendinitis which saw him sit on the sidelines for 18 months.

He studied at the University of Salford for a degree in Physiotherapy which he completed in the summer of 2011.

== Honours ==
Republic of Ireland U18

- UEFA European Under-18 Football Championship: 1998
