= Stuart Douglas =

English footballer, television presenter and physiotherapist

Personal information
- Full name: Stuart Anthony Douglas
- Date of birth: 9 April 1978 (age 48)
- Place of birth: Enfield, England
- Height: 5 ft 10 in (1.78 m)
- Position: Striker

Team information
- Current team: AFC Bournemouth (Physiotherapist)

Youth career
- 1995–1996: Luton Town

Senior career*
| Years | Team | Apps | (Gls) |
| 1996–2002 | Luton Town | 146 | (18) |
| 2001 | → Oxford United (loan) | 4 | (0) |
| 2002 | → Rushden & Diamonds (loan) | 9 | (0) |
| 2002–2004 | Boston United | 58 | (8) |
| 2004 | RoPS | 10 | (3) |
| 2004–2005 | Dagenham & Redbridge | 4 | (0) |
| 2005–2006 | Crawley Town | 7 | (1) |
| 2007–2008 | Weymouth | 16 | (1) |
| 2008–2010 | Bath City | 50 | (11) |
| 2010 | → Newport County (loan) | 6 | (1) |
| 2010 | Dorchester Town | 8 | (0) |
| 2010 | Poole Town | 0 | (0) |
- * Club domestic league appearances and goals as of 12:16, 14 October 2010 (UTC)

Stuart Anthony Douglas (born 9 April 1978) is an English retired footballer and television presenter. In October 2020, he was appointed as physiotherapist at AFC Bournemouth.

== Career ==
Douglas began his career with Luton Town as a youth player, going on to make 146 football league appearances for the club. Having fallen out of favour at the club, Douglas spent time on loan at Oxford United and Rushden & Diamonds before being released at the end of the 2001–02 season, moving to Boston United in August 2002. Douglas left Boston in 2004, spending time in Finland playing for RoPS before returning to England with Dagenham & Redbridge.

Prior to the 2009–10 season, Douglas was forced to undergo surgery to insert titanium plates into his neck to fix prolapsed discs in his spine. Following the operation, he was unable to regain his place in the Bath City side and instead joined Conference South leaders Newport County in February 2010 in a loan exchange deal with Dave Gilroy. He made his debut for the club on 20 February as a substitute in place of Craig Reid during a 4–0 win over Hampton & Richmond Borough. He made a total of six appearances during his loan spell, scoring his only goal during a 5–1 win over Basingstoke Town, before returning to Bath in March 2010. At the end of the season, with Bath winning promotion to the Conference Premier, Douglas was released, and in August 2010, following a successful pre-season spell, he signed for Dorchester Town. He was released by The Magpies in October 2010. He joined Poole Town on 4 November 2010. Between June 2013 and October 2020, he served as physio for AFC Wimbledon.

== Personal life ==
Douglas has three sons and a daughter. He is a qualified physiotherapist.

He runs a design company with his sister Scarlette Douglas. The pair also present property shows Worst House on the Street and Can't Sell, Must Sell.
