= James Ayres =

English footballer

Personal information
- Full name: James Martin Ayres
- Date of birth: 18 September 1980 (age 46)
- Place of birth: Luton, England
- Height: 1.91 m (6 ft 3 in)
- Position: Central defender

Youth career
- –1999: Luton Town

Senior career*
Years	Team	Apps	(Gls)
1999–2001	Luton Town	0	(0)
2000	→ Stevenage Borough (loan)	6	(0)
2000	→ Stevenage Borough (loan)	2	(0)
2001	Dagenham & Redbridge	1	(0)
2001	Kettering Town	1	(0)
2001–2002	Enfield	35	(2)
2002–2006	Hitchin Town		
- Braintree Town
- * Club domestic league appearances and goals

James Martin Ayres (born 18 September 1980) is an English former footballer who played as a central defender. He played in the Football League for Luton Town and in non-League football for Stevenage Borough, Dagenham & Redbridge, Kettering Town, Hitchin Town and Braintree Town.
