= Landry Zahana-Oni =

Ivorian footballer (born 1976)

Personal information
- Full name: Landry Zahana-Oni
- Date of birth: 8 August 1976 (age 50)
- Place of birth: Abidjan, Ivory Coast
- Height: 5 ft 9 in (1.75 m)
- Position: Striker

Senior career*
Years	Team	Apps	(Gls)
1997–1998	Stirling Albion	28	(5)
1998–1999	Bromley		
1999–2000	Luton Town	9	(0)
2000	Montrose	2	(0)
2000–2001	Ross County	6	(0)
2001	Airdrieonians	1	(0)
2001	Dulwich Hamlet		
2001–2004	Hastings United		
2004	Carshalton Athletic	4	(0)
2004	Bromley	14	(3)
2004–2007	AEL Limassol	40	(4)
Total		104	(12)

International career
1992	France U16	1	(1)
1993	France U17	1	(0)
- * Club domestic league appearances and goals

Landry Zahana-Oni (born 8 August 1976) is an Ivorian former professional footballer who played as a striker.
