= Stuart Fraser (footballer, born 1980) =

Scottish footballer

Personal information
- Full name: Stuart Thomas Fraser
- Date of birth: 9 January 1980 (age 46)
- Place of birth: Edinburgh, Scotland
- Position: Defender

Senior career*
| Years | Team | Apps | (Gls) |
| 1998–2002 | Luton Town | 44 | (1) |
| 2002–2003 | Stevenage Borough | 31 | (1) |
| 2003–2006 | Arniston Rangers | | |
| 2006–2009 | Berwick Rangers | 45 | (4) |
| 2009– | Musselburgh Athletic | | |

International career
| 2000 | Scotland U21 | 5 | (0) |
- * Club domestic league appearances and goals

Stuart Thomas Fraser (born 9 January 1980) is a Scottish footballer.

Fraser started his career at Luton Town, making his debut at the end of the 1997–98 season. He scored his first and only goal for the club in September 1999 in a 4–2 win against Oxford United. Fraser was a regular in the starting lineup at the start of the 2000–01 season, and earned himself a callup to the Scotland under-21 national team. In January 2001, Fraser suffered a broken leg in an FA Cup match against Queen's Park Rangers. He failed to regain his place in the first team and was released in March 2002. He made a total of 44 league appearances for the club.

Following a short trial with Dundee United, he signed for Stevenage Borough. He made his debut against Morecambe, making 31 appearances for the club before moving on to Arniston Rangers in the Scottish Junior League. He signed for Berwick Rangers in 2006, He won the Scottish Third Division with Berwick during his first season at the club, but after suffering another broken leg in the following season he barely featured for the team again. In 2009, he moved to Musselburgh Athletic.
