= Trésor Kandol =

Congolese footballer (born 1981)

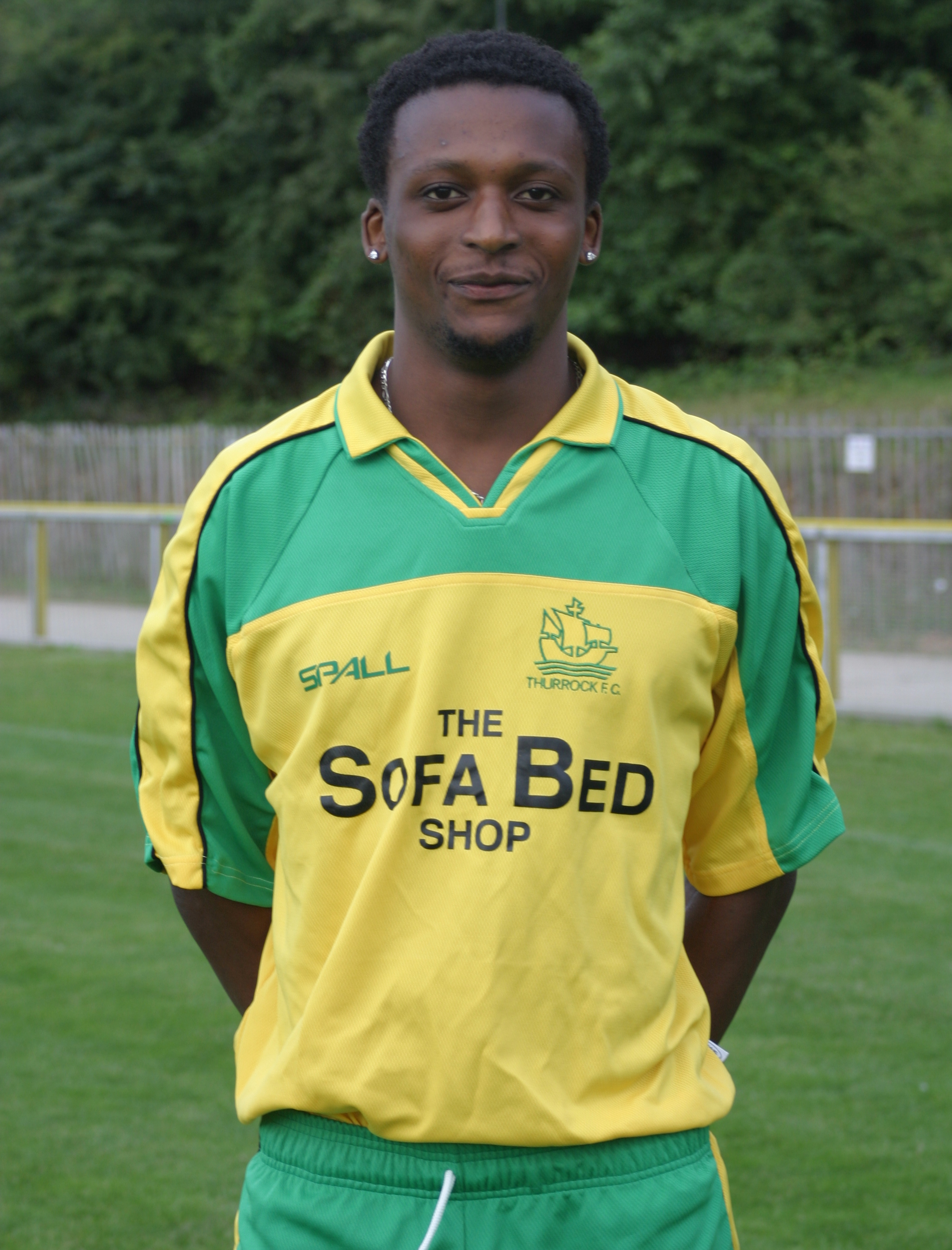

Personal information
- Full name: Trésor Osmar Kandol
- Date of birth: 30 August 1981 (age 45)
- Place of birth: Banga, Zaire
- Height: 1.85 m (6 ft 1 in)
- Position: Forward

Senior career*
Years	Team	Apps	(Gls)
1998–2001	Luton Town	21	(3)
2001	Cambridge United	4	(0)
2001–2002	AFC Bournemouth	12	(0)
2002–2005	Thurrock	83	(61)
2005–2006	Dagenham & Redbridge	12	(6)
2005–2006	→ Darlington (loan)	7	(2)
2006–2007	Barnet	29	(10)
2006–2007	→ Leeds United (loan)	9	(1)
2007–2010	Leeds United	59	(13)
2008–2009	→ Millwall (loan)	18	(8)
2009	→ Charlton Athletic (loan)	13	(2)
2010–2011	Albacete	0	(0)
2012	Hampton & Richmond Borough	3	(1)
2015	Hackney Wick	0	(0)
Total		270	(107)

International career
2008	DR Congo	1	(0)
- * Club domestic league appearances and goals

Trésor Osmar Kandol (born 30 August 1981) is a Congolese former professional footballer who played as a forward. Over his career he played for clubs including Isthmian League Premier Division side Hampton & Richmond Borough, as well as for Barnet, Chesham United, Darlington, Dagenham & Redbridge, Thurrock, AFC Bournemouth, Cambridge United, Luton Town and Leeds United in England, and Albacete in Spain. He made one appearance for the DR Congo national team. He usually celebrated his goals with a somersault, like his cousin Lomana Tresor LuaLua. Kandol became known as Kandola in Spain.

== Club career ==
=== Early career ===
Kandol started his career at Luton Town where he was voted young player of the year twice, broke the record of the youngest player to play in the first team and then went to AFC Bournemouth, where he scored once in the Football League Trophy against future club Barnet. He then dropped to non-league football and became a highly prolific goalscorer at Thurrock, his tally of 79 goals in 110 games got him noticed back at a higher level of football and he joined Dagenham & Redbridge in the conference where he scored nine goals in 13 games and subsequently had a successful loan spell back in league football at Darlington.

=== Barnet ===
On 18 November 2006, Kandol scored an injury time winner against Rochdale at Underhill to complete his hat-trick that also saw Barnet win their third consecutive league game. Kandol's impact for Barnet saw him topping up the chart as the top scorer in FA Cup with six goals to his name, he highlighted himself by scoring by lobbing the goalkeeper from the halfway line against Cardiff City and a header to take them out of the cup, followed by another two against Cheltenham Town but his best performance came from Elland Road where he scored a powerful header. A string of good performances attracted the attention of several Championship clubs such as Crystal Palace, Cardiff City, Watford, Hull City and Leeds United. Whilst at Barnet in 2006, Kandol was sent to prison for 13 weeks for a series of driving offences.

=== Leeds United ===
After scoring 18 goals from 21 games for Barnet at the start of the 2006–07 season, Kandol joined Championship club Leeds United in a two-month loan deal on 23 November 2006. He made his debut two days later as a substitute replacing Robbie Blake in the 2–1 victory over Plymouth Argyle. His full home debut came with a debut goal in front of his new fans against Barnsley. When the January 2007 transfer window opened, his move to Elland Road was made permanent by Dennis Wise for an initial fee of £320,000. After Leeds were relegated to the third tier of English football for the first time in their history, Kandol scored a last-minute winner against Tranmere Rovers in the opening game of the 2007–08 Football League One. He formed a successful strike partnership with Jermaine Beckford in the first half of the season, winning him player of the August and September month award but loss of form and the arrival of Dougie Freedman meant Kandol lost his place in the starting eleven despite scoring 15 goals, as Leeds went on to reach the playoffs. He was a second-half substitute as Leeds lost 1–0 in the final against Doncaster Rovers.

Leeds signed forwards Luciano Becchio and Enoch Showunmi during the 2008 close season, and Kandol was allowed to join Millwall on loan until January 2009. He opened the scoring just 13 seconds into his "Lions" debut, but his new club lost 4–3 at Oldham Athletic. In September, he was sent off in the last few seconds for a bad tackle on Leicester City's Michael Morrison, then marked his return from the resultant three-match ban by scoring twice in the first 12 minutes against Tranmere Rovers. Following that, Kandol then went on to score another two against Bristol Rovers, one at Carlisle, and one against Huddersfield winning him several man of the match awards, becoming top scorer at the club and helping Millwall to rise to second in the League. After his loan expired, he went straight back out on loan again, joining Championship side Charlton Athletic on 30 January 2009 until the end of the season. His first and only goals for the club came in a losing cause against Watford after a successful loan spell in a struggling club, Charlton made an offer of £400,000 for Kandol's services the next season but were turned down due to his transformation in form gathering the attention of Leeds manager Simon Grayson who now wanted to include him in his club's plans.

Before the 2009–10 season, Kandol was told he had no future at Leeds, but after playing well for the reserve team – he scored a hat-trick in a 6–1 defeat of Scunthorpe United's reserves – and when given an opportunity in the Football League Trophy, he returned to the league team in place of the injured Becchio against Norwich City on 19 October. Two weeks later, he came on as a late substitute to score the last of Leeds' four goals against Yeovil Town but was charged with violent conduct in an incident after the final whistle and received a three-match ban. He scored against Bristol Rovers, Kettering and Darlington, all by coming off the bench, but still didn't seem enough for the manager. His season was interrupted by injury, and he made infrequent appearances from the bench until what proved his last game for the club, a 1–0 defeat at Norwich City. Only 20 seconds after entering the game as a late substitute, he took hold of opponent Darel Russell by the throat, was sent off and received a four-match ban. Kandol was initially made available on a free transfer after several meetings with Leeds boardroom staff he decided the time was right for him to look for new challenge. On 4 August 2010 the decision was made by Kandol and his representatives to leave the club by mutual consent.

=== Albacete ===
After becoming a free agent and able to sign for a club outside the transfer window on 5 September Kandol signed for Spanish second division side Albacete. However, his spell in Spain was short lived because of injuries and he left the club by mutual consent in November 2010 after the club president described him as great lad with superb sense of humour.

In August 2011, Kandol held talks with League Two side Plymouth Argyle about joining the club. However, after seemingly agreeing terms on a one-year contract he failed to turn up to training as arranged on 4 August and a scheduled press conference. As of 5 August 2011, Plymouth Argyle manager Peter Reid are unsure of Kandol's whereabouts and whether the deal will be signed. In interview, Reid was understandably frustrated and stated that the club had sent a car to the railway station to collect Kandol, but he was "a no show".

Kandol retired from full-time professional football in 2011,

=== Hampton & Richmond ===
In October 2012, Kandol signed for Isthmian League Premier Division side Hampton & Richmond Borough. Kandol was released on 30 November when Hampton & Richmond Borough said they could no longer afford Kandol's wages.

== International career ==
Kandol won his first and only cap for the Congo DR national team in 2008 against Algeria in a friendly. The Congo DR national team won the match 1–0.

== Personal life ==
Kandol was born in Banga. His cousins, Lomana LuaLua and Kazenga LuaLua have also played professional football. He was known to often celebrate scoring a goal by performing a backflip.
