= 1995–96 Watford F.C. season =

English football team season

Watford
1995–96 season
- Chairman: Jack Petchey
- Manager: Glenn Roeder (until February); Graham Taylor (from February)
- Stadium: Vicarage Road
- Football League First Division: 23rd (relegated)
- FA Cup: Third round
- League Cup: Third round
- Top goalscorer: Ramage (15)
- Highest home attendance: 20,089 (vs. Leicester City, 5 May)
- Lowest home attendance: 7,091 (vs. Southend United, 4 November)
- Average home league attendance: 9,457

During the 1995–96 English football season, Watford F.C. competed in the Football League First Division.

== Season summary ==
In Glenn Roeder's third season as manager, Watford struggled and Roeder was sacked in February with the club bottom of the table. Graham Taylor returned to Watford as Director of Football in February 1996, with former player Kenny Jackett as head coach, but was unable to stop the club from sliding into Division Two.

== Final league table ==
Pos	Team	Pld	W	D	L	GF	GA	GD	Pts	Qualification or relegation
20	Wolverhampton Wanderers	46	13	16	17	56	62	−6	55	
21	Portsmouth	46	13	13	20	61	69	−8	52	
22	Millwall (R)	46	13	13	20	43	63	−20	52	Relegation to the Second Division
23	Watford (R)	46	10	18	18	62	70	−8	48	Relegation to the Second Division
24	Luton Town (R)	46	11	12	23	40	64	−24	45	Relegation to the Second Division

Rules for classification: 1) Points; 2) Goals scored; 3) Goal difference
(R) Relegated

== Results ==
Watford's score comes first

=== Legend ===
Win	Draw	Loss

=== Football League First Division ===
Date	Opponent	Venue	Result	Attendance	Scorers
12 August 1995	Sheffield United	H	2–1	8,667	Payne, Johnson
19 August 1995	Huddersfield Town	A	0–1	10,556	
26 August 1995	Barnsley	H	2–3	8,049	Phillips (2)
29 August 1995	Charlton Athletic	A	1–2	8,442	Mooney
2 September 1995	Grimsby Town	A	0–0	3,993	
9 September 1995	Stoke City	H	3–0	7,130	Ramage (2), Mooney
12 September 1995	Crystal Palace	H	0–0	8,780	
16 September 1995	Ipswich Town	A	2–4	11,441	Pitcher, Phillips
23 September 1995	Birmingham City	H	1–1	9,422	Moralee
30 September 1995	Tranmere Rovers	A	3–2	7,041	Foster, Mooney, Moralee
7 October 1995	Millwall	H	0–1	8,918	
14 October 1995	Sunderland	A	1–1	17,790	Moralee
21 October 1995	Wolverhampton Wanderers	H	1–1	11,319	Holdsworth
28 October 1995	Portsmouth	A	2–4	7,025	Ramage, Phillips
4 November 1995	Southend United	H	2–2	7,091	Caskey, Phillips
11 November 1995	Leicester City	A	0–1	16,230	
18 November 1995	Port Vale	A	1–1	6,265	Ramage
21 November 1995	Luton Town	H	1–1	10,042	Phillips
26 November 1995	Norwich City	H	0–2	7,798	
2 December 1995	Millwall	A	2–1	8,389	Phillips (2)
9 December 1995	Birmingham City	A	0–1	16,970	
16 December 1995	Tranmere Rovers	H	3–0	7,257	Phillips (2, 1 pen), Foster
23 December 1995	Oldham Athletic	A	0–0	5,878	
13 January 1996	Huddersfield Town	H	0–1	7,568	
20 January 1996	Sheffield United	A	1–1	12,782	Bazeley
3 February 1996	Barnsley	A	1–2	6,139	Penrice
10 February 1996	Charlton Athletic	H	1–2	8,394	Phillips
17 February 1996	Crystal Palace	A	0–4	13,235	
24 February 1996	Ipswich Town	H	2–3	11,872	Palmer, White
28 February 1996	Stoke City	A	0–2	10,114	
2 March 1996	Reading	A	0–0	8,933	
5 March 1996	Derby County	H	0–0	8,306	
9 March 1996	Oldham Athletic	H	2–1	10,961	Ramage (2)
12 March 1996	West Bromwich Albion	A	4–4	11,836	Foster (2), Ramage (2)
16 March 1996	Derby County	A	1–1	15,939	Foster
23 March 1996	West Bromwich Albion	H	1–1	10,334	Ramage
30 March 1996	Wolverhampton Wanderers	A	0–3	25,885	
2 April 1996	Sunderland	H	3–3	11,195	Mooney (2), Ramage
6 April 1996	Portsmouth	H	1–2	8,226	Mooney
8 April 1996	Southend United	A	1–1	5,348	Ramage
13 April 1996	Port Vale	H	5–2	9,066	Connolly (3), White (2)
16 April 1996	Reading	H	4–2	8,113	White (2), Connolly, Ramage
20 April 1996	Luton Town	A	0–0	9,454	
23 April 1996	Grimsby Town	H	6–3	8,909	Ramage (3), Connolly (3)
27 April 1996	Norwich City	A	2–1	14,188	Connolly, Porter
5 May 1996	Leicester City	H	0–1	20,089	

=== FA Cup ===
Round	Date	Opponent	Venue	Result	Attendance	Goalscorers
R3	6 January 1996	Wimbledon	H	1–1	11,187	Mooney
R3R	17 January 1996	Wimbledon	A	0–1	5,142	

=== League Cup ===
Round	Date	Opponent	Venue	Result	Attendance	Goalscorers
R2 First Leg	19 September 1995	Bournemouth	H	1–1	5,037	Johnson
R2 Second Leg	3 October 1995	Bournemouth	A	1–1 (won 6–5 on pens)	4,365	Bazeley
R3	24 October 1995	Blackburn Rovers	H	1–2	17,035	Phillips

== Players ==
=== First-team squad ===
Note: Flags indicate national team as defined under FIFA eligibility rules; some limited exceptions apply. Players may hold more than one non-FIFA nationality.

No.	Pos.	Nation	Player
—	GK	(England) ENG	Steve Cherry
—	GK	(England) ENG	Kevin Miller
—	DF	(England) ENG	David Barnes
—	DF	(England) ENG	Darren Bazeley
—	DF	(England) ENG	Colin Foster
—	DF	(England) ENG	Nigel Gibbs
—	DF	(England) ENG	David Holdsworth
—	DF	(England) ENG	Dominic Ludden
—	DF	(England) ENG	Keith Millen
—	DF	(England) ENG	Warren Neill
—	DF	(England) ENG	Steve Palmer
—	DF	(England) ENG	Darren Ward
—	DF	(Wales) WAL	Rob Page
—	DF	(Scotland) SCO	Gerard Lavin (Note: Lavin was born in Corby, England, but also qualified to represent Scotland internationally and represented them at U-21 level.)
—	MF	(England) ENG	Darren Caskey (on loan from Tottenham Hotspur)
—	MF	(England) ENG	Andy Hessenthaler
—	MF	(England) ENG	Danny Hill (on loan from Tottenham Hotspur)

No.	Pos.	Nation	Player
—	MF	(England) ENG	Steve Hodge
—	MF	(England) ENG	Derek Payne
—	MF	(England) ENG	Geoff Pitcher
—	MF	(England) ENG	Gary Porter
—	MF	(England) ENG	Craig Ramage
—	MF	(England) ENG	Colin Simpson
—	MF	(Australia) AUS	Richard Johnson
—	FW	(England) ENG	Peter Beadle
—	FW	(England) ENG	Kerry Dixon
—	FW	(England) ENG	Tommy Mooney
—	FW	(England) ENG	Jamie Moralee
—	FW	(England) ENG	Gary Penrice
—	FW	(England) ENG	Kevin Phillips
—	FW	(England) ENG	Devon White
—	FW	(England) ENG	Paul Wilkinson (on loan from Middlesbrough)
—	FW	(Republic of Ireland) IRL	David Connolly (Note: Connolly was born in Brent, England, but also qualified to represent the Republic of Ireland internationally and made his international debut for the Republic of Ireland in May 1996.)

=== Left club during season ===
Note: Flags indicate national team as defined under FIFA eligibility rules; some limited exceptions apply. Players may hold more than one non-FIFA nationality.

No.	Pos.	Nation	Player
—	FW	(England) ENG	Peter Beadle (to Bristol Rovers)

=== Reserves and academy ===
Note: Flags indicate national team as defined under FIFA eligibility rules; some limited exceptions apply. Players may hold more than one non-FIFA nationality.

No.	Pos.	Nation	Player
—	FW	(England) ENG	Wayne Andrews
