= 1994–95 Watford F.C. season =

English football team season

Watford
1994–95 season
- Chairman: Jack Petchey
- Manager: Glenn Roeder
- Stadium: Vicarage Road
- First Division: 7th
- FA Cup: Fifth round
- League Cup: Second round
- Top goalscorer: League: Ramage/Phillips (9); All: Ramage (11)
- Average home league attendance: 8,125

During the 1994–95 English football season, Watford F.C. competed in the Football League First Division.

== Season summary ==
Before the start of the 1994–95 season, the Hornets were bookmakers' favourites for relegation but after a shaky start, Roeder's team proved critics wrong by challenging for a play-off place and never were in danger of being dragged into a relegation battle but in the end, inconsistency on their travels cost them a play-off place and had to settle for a 7th place finish.

== Final league table ==
Pos	Team	Pld	W	D	L	GF	GA	GD	Pts	Qualification or relegation
5	Tranmere Rovers	46	22	10	14	67	58	+9	76	Qualification for the First Division play-offs
6	Barnsley	46	20	12	14	63	52	+11	72	
7	Watford	46	19	13	14	52	46	+6	70	
8	Sheffield United	46	17	17	12	74	55	+19	68	
9	Derby County	46	18	12	16	66	51	+15	66	

Rules for classification: 1) Points; 2) Goals scored; 3) Goal difference

== Results ==
Watford's score comes first

=== Legend ===
Win	Draw	Loss

=== Football League First Division ===
Date	Opponent	Venue	Result	Attendance	Scorers
13 August 1994	Sheffield United	A	0–3	16,820	
20 August 1994	Grimsby Town	H	0–0	6,324	
27 August 1994	Swindon Town	A	0–1	9,781	
30 August 1994	Wolverhampton Wanderers	H	2–1	10,108	Foster, Johnson
3 September 1994	Middlesbrough	H	1–1	9,478	Johnson
10 September 1994	Barnsley	A	0–0	4,251	
13 September 1994	Oldham Athletic	A	2–0	7,243	Holdsworth, Porter (pen)
17 September 1994	Luton Town	H	2–4	8,880	Mooney, Moralee
24 September 1994	Reading	H	2–2	8,015	Johnson, Moralee
1 October 1994	Charlton Athletic	A	0–3	8,169	
8 October 1994	Derby County	A	1–1	13,413	Nogan
15 October 1994	Notts County	H	3–1	7,008	Nogan, Moralee, Ramage
22 October 1994	Tranmere Rovers	H	2–0	6,987	Nogan (2)
29 October 1994	Bolton Wanderers	A	0–3	10,483	
1 November 1994	Burnley	A	1–1	11,739	Nogan
5 November 1994	West Bromwich Albion	H	1–0	8,419	Mooney
12 November 1994	Southend United	H	1–0	8,551	Nogan
19 November 1994	Sunderland	A	3–1	15,063	Hessenthaler, Mooney (pen), Nogan
26 November 1994	Stoke City	H	0–0	9,126	
3 December 1994	Tranmere Rovers	A	1–2	7,301	Moralee
10 December 1994	Grimsby Town	A	0–0	6,288	
17 December 1994	Sheffield United	H	0–0	8,919	
26 December 1994	Portsmouth	H	2–0	9,953	Ramage, Shipperley
27 December 1994	Millwall	A	1–2	12,289	Ramage
31 December 1994	Port Vale	H	3–2	7,794	Ramage, Foster, Musselwhite (own goal)
2 January 1995	Bristol City	A	0–0	9,423	
14 January 1995	Bolton Wanderers	H	0–0	9,113	
1 February 1995	West Bromwich Albion	A	1–0	15,754	Ramage (pen)
4 February 1995	Southend United	A	4–0	4,914	Bazeley (3), Ramage (pen)
11 February 1995	Burnley	H	2–0	9,297	Ramage, Bazeley
21 February 1995	Sunderland	H	0–1	8,189	
4 March 1995	Reading	A	1–4	9,705	Phillips
7 March 1995	Middlesbrough	A	0–2	16,630	
11 March 1995	Swindon Town	H	2–0	7,123	Hessenthaler, Phillips
18 March 1995	Wolverhampton Wanderers	A	1–1	24,380	Phillips
21 March 1995	Barnsley	H	3–2	6,883	Porter, Millen, Phillips
26 March 1995	Luton Town	A	1–1	7,984	Phillips
1 April 1995	Oldham Athletic	H	1–2	8,090	Ramage
4 April 1995	Stoke City	A	0–1	9,576	
8 April 1995	Port Vale	A	1–0	7,276	Porter
14 April 1995	Millwall	H	1–0	6,907	Pitcher
17 April 1995	Portsmouth	A	1–2	8,396	Phillips
22 April 1995	Bristol City	H	1–0	7,190	Phillips
29 April 1995	Notts County	A	0–1	5,083	
2 May 1995	Charlton Athletic	H	2–0	6,024	Beadle, Phillips
7 May 1995	Derby County	H	2–1	8,492	Phillips, Ramage (pen)

=== FA Cup ===
Round	Date	Opponent	Venue	Result	Attendance	Goalscorers
R3	7 January 1995	Scarborough	A	0–0	3,544	
R3R	17 January 1995	Scarborough	H	2–0	7,047	Hessenthaler 50', Holdsworth 71'
R4	28 January 1995	Swindon Town	H	1–0	11,202	Hessenthaler 43'
R5	18 February 1995	Crystal Palace	H	0–0	13,814	
R5R	1 March 1995	Crystal Palace	A	0–1	10,321	

=== League Cup ===
Round	Date	Opponent	Venue	Result	Attendance	Goalscorers
R1 First Leg	16 August 1994	Southend United	A	0–0	2,859	
R1 Second Leg	23 August 1994	Southend United	H	1–0 (won 1–0 on agg)	4,582	Ramage
R2 First Leg	21 September 1994	Tottenham Hotspur	H	3–6	11,382	Mooney, Mabbutt (own goal), Ramage
R2 Second Leg	4 October 1994	Tottenham Hotspur	A	3–2 (lost 6–8 on agg)	6,482	Foster, Nogan (2)

== Players ==
=== First-team squad ===
Squad at end of season

Note: Flags indicate national team as defined under FIFA eligibility rules; some limited exceptions apply. Players may hold more than one non-FIFA nationality.

No.	Pos.	Nation	Player
—	GK	(England) ENG	Perry Digweed
—	GK	(England) ENG	Kevin Miller
—	DF	(England) ENG	David Barnes
—	DF	(England) ENG	Darren Bazeley
—	DF	(England) ENG	Colin Foster
—	DF	(England) ENG	Nigel Gibbs
—	DF	(England) ENG	David Holdsworth
—	DF	(England) ENG	Dominic Ludden
—	DF	(England) ENG	Keith Millen
—	DF	(England) ENG	Kenny Sansom
—	DF	(England) ENG	Jason Soloman
—	DF	(Wales) WAL	Rob Page
—	DF	(Scotland) SCO	Gerard Lavin (Note: Lavin was born in Corby, England, but also qualified to represent Scotland internationally and represented them at U-21 level.)
—	DF	(Canada) CAN	Mark Watson
—	MF	(England) ENG	Gary Fitzgerald
—	MF	(England) ENG	Andy Hessenthaler

No.	Pos.	Nation	Player
—	MF	(England) ENG	Derek Payne
—	MF	(England) ENG	Geoff Pitcher
—	MF	(England) ENG	Gary Porter
—	MF	(England) ENG	Craig Ramage
—	MF	(Australia) AUS	Richard Johnson
—	FW	(England) ENG	Peter Beadle
—	FW	(England) ENG	David Connolly (Note: Connolly was born in Brent, England, but also qualified to represent the Republic of Ireland internationally and would make his international debut for the Republic of Ireland in May 1996.)
—	FW	(England) ENG	Alex Inglethorpe
—	FW	(England) ENG	Nigel Jemson
—	FW	(England) ENG	Tommy Mooney
—	FW	(England) ENG	Jamie Moralee
—	FW	(England) ENG	Kevin Phillips
—	FW	(England) ENG	Micky Quinn
—	FW	(England) ENG	Neil Shipperley
—	FW	(Wales) WAL	Lee Nogan
