= 1996–97 Watford F.C. season =

English football team season

Watford
1996–97 season
- Chairman: Jack Petchey
- Manager: Kenny Jackett
- Stadium: Vicarage Road
- Second Division: 13th
- FA Cup: Fourth round
- League Cup: Second round
- Football League Trophy: Southern semi finals
- Top goalscorer: Mooney (13)
- Average home league attendance: 8,894

During the 1996–97 English football season, Watford F.C. competed in the Football League Second Division.

== Season summary ==
In the 1996–97 season, although Jackett oversaw a long unbeaten stretch of results, Watford were unable to mount a serious promotion challenge and finished a disappointing campaign in 13th place – Watford's lowest position in the league structure since the 1970s. During the close season, Jackett was demoted to the position of first-team coach, with Graham Taylor once again becoming manager.

== Final league table ==
Pos	Team	Pld	W	D	L	GF	GA	GD	Pts
11	Gillingham	46	19	10	17	60	59	+1	67
12	Walsall	46	19	10	17	54	53	+1	67
13	Watford	46	16	19	11	45	38	+7	67
14	Millwall	46	16	13	17	50	55	−5	61
15	Preston North End	46	18	7	21	49	55	−6	61

Rules for classification: In the Football League goals scored (GF) takes precedence over goal difference (GD).

== Results ==
Watford's score comes first

=== Legend ===
Win	Draw	Loss

=== Football League Second Division ===
Date	Opponent	Venue	Result	Attendance	Scorers
17 August 1996	Bournemouth	A	2–1	7,672	Connolly, White
24 August 1996	Millwall	H	0–2	9,495	
27 August 1996	Plymouth Argyle	H	0–2	7,349	
31 August 1996	Crewe Alexandra	A	2–0	3,655	Palmer, Mooney
7 September 1996	Stockport County	H	1–0	7,208	Mooney (pen)
10 September 1996	Notts County	A	3–2	3,660	Mooney (2), Andrews
14 September 1996	Bristol Rovers	A	1–0	6,276	White
21 September 1996	Peterborough United	H	0–0	12,007	
28 September 1996	Shrewsbury Town	A	0–1	3,655	
1 October 1996	Preston North End	H	1–0	6,434	Palmer
5 October 1996	York City	A	2–1	5,232	Andrews, Penrice
12 October 1996	Wrexham	H	1–1	8,441	Mooney (pen)
15 October 1996	Burnley	H	2–2	6,450	Andrews, R Johnson
19 October 1996	Bury	A	1–1	4,092	Andrews
26 October 1996	Blackpool	A	1–1	6,072	Mooney
29 October 1996	Luton Town	H	1–1	14,109	Bazeley
2 November 1996	Brentford	H	2–0	11,448	Gibbs, Mooney
9 November 1996	Rotherham United	A	0–0	3,619	
19 November 1996	Wycombe Wanderers	H	1–0	7,657	Connolly
30 November 1996	Blackpool	H	2–2	12,017	Millen, Noel-Williams
3 December 1996	Bristol City	A	1–1	9,097	Noel-Williams
14 December 1996	Walsall	H	1–1	3,674	R Johnson
21 December 1996	Gillingham	H	0–0	7,809	
26 December 1996	Notts County	H	0–0	9,065	
18 January 1997	Preston North End	A	1–1	8,735	Mooney
27 January 1997	Luton Town	A	0–0	7,428	
1 February 1997	Rotherham United	H	2–0	10,657	Bazeley, Slater
8 February 1997	Brentford	A	1–1	8,679	Scott
22 February 1997	Wycombe Wanderers	A	0–0	8,438	
25 February 1997	Shrewsbury Town	H	2–0	6,378	Phillips, Bazeley
1 March 1997	Bristol City	H	3–0	8,539	Phillips (3)
4 March 1997	Peterborough United	A	1–2	4,200	Mooney
8 March 1997	Gillingham	A	1–3	7,385	Scott
15 March 1997	Walsall	H	1–0	7,818	Mooney
18 March 1997	Bristol Rovers	H	1–0	6,139	Mooney
22 March 1997	Millwall	A	1–0	8,713	Mooney
29 March 1997	Bournemouth	H	0–1	10,019	
31 March 1997	Plymouth Argyle	A	0–0	6,836	
5 April 1997	Crewe Alexandra	H	0–1	12,441	
8 April 1997	Chesterfield	A	0–0	4,258	
12 April 1997	York City	H	4–0	7,645	Ramage (2), Mooney, Easton
14 April 1997	Stockport County	A	0–1	7,164	
19 April 1997	Wrexham	A	1–3	3,437	Ramage
24 April 1997	Chesterfield	H	0–2	6,411	
26 April 1997	Bury	H	0–0	9,017	
3 May 1997	Burnley	A	1–4	8,269	Millen

=== FA Cup ===
Round	Date	Opponent	Venue	Result	Attendance	Goalscorers
R1	17 November 1996	Northampton Town	A	1–0	7,342	Bazeley
R2	7 December 1996	Ashford Town	H	5–0	7,590	Bazeley (2), Connolly (3)
R3	21 January 1997	Oxford United	H	2–0	9,502	White, Connolly
R4	5 February 1997	Manchester City	A	1–3	24,031	Noel-Williams

=== League Cup ===
Round	Date	Opponent	Venue	Result	Attendance	Goalscorers
R1 1st Leg	20 August 1996	Walsall	A	0–1	2,659	
R1 2nd Leg	3 September 1996	Walsall	H	2–0 (won 2–1 on agg)	5,325	Andrews, Porter
R2 1st Leg	17 September 1996	Sunderland	H	0–2	9,136	
R2 2nd Leg	24 September 1996	Sunderland	A	0–1 (lost 0–3 on agg)	10,659	

=== Football League Trophy ===
Round	Date	Opponent	Venue	Result	Attendance	Goalscorers
SR2	7 January 1997	Torquay United	H	2–1	2,298	Page, Connolly
SQF	11 February 1997	Bristol City	H	2–1	3,142	Andrews, Bazeley
SSF	18 February 1997	Peterborough United	H	0–1	4,941	

== Players ==
=== First-team squad ===
Squad at end of season Note: Flags indicate national team as defined under FIFA eligibility rules; some limited exceptions apply. Players may hold more than one non-FIFA nationality.

No.	Pos.	Nation	Player
—	GK	(England) ENG	Alec Chamberlain
—	GK	(England) ENG	Kevin Miller
—	DF	(England) ENG	Darren Bazeley
—	DF	(England) ENG	Colin Foster
—	DF	(England) ENG	Nigel Gibbs
—	DF	(England) ENG	Dominic Ludden
—	DF	(England) ENG	Keith Millen
—	DF	(Wales) WAL	Rob Page
—	DF	(England) ENG	Steve Palmer
—	DF	(England) ENG	Paul Robinson
—	DF	(England) ENG	Darren Ward
—	MF	(England) ENG	Clint Easton
—	MF	(England) ENG	Richard Flash
—	MF	(Australia) AUS	Richard Johnson

No.	Pos.	Nation	Player
—	MF	(England) ENG	Gary Porter
—	MF	(England) ENG	Craig Ramage
—	MF	(England) ENG	Stuart Slater
—	MF	(England) ENG	Steve Talboys
—	FW	(England) ENG	Wayne Andrews
—	FW	(Republic of Ireland) IRL	David Connolly (Note: Connolly was born in Brent, England, but also qualified to represent the Republic of Ireland internationally and made his international debut for the Republic of Ireland in May 1996.)
—	FW	(England) ENG	Nathan Lowndes
—	FW	(England) ENG	Tommy Mooney
—	FW	(England) ENG	Gifton Noel-Williams
—	FW	(England) ENG	Gary Penrice
—	FW	(England) ENG	Kevin Phillips
—	FW	(England) ENG	Keith Scott (on loan from Norwich City)
—	FW	(England) ENG	Devon White

=== Left club during season ===
Note: Flags indicate national team as defined under FIFA eligibility rules; some limited exceptions apply. Players may hold more than one non-FIFA nationality.

No.	Pos.	Nation	Player
—	DF	(England) ENG	Craig Armstrong (on loan from Nottingham Forest)
—	DF	(England) ENG	David Holdsworth (to Sheffield United)

No.	Pos.	Nation	Player
—	MF	(England) ENG	Craig Ramage (on loan to Peterborough United)

=== Reserve squad ===
Note: Flags indicate national team as defined under FIFA eligibility rules; some limited exceptions apply. Players may hold more than one non-FIFA nationality.

No.	Pos.	Nation	Player
—	DF	(England) ENG	Colin Miles
—	DF	(England) ENG	David Perpetuini
—	DF	(England) ENG	Mark Rooney
—	MF	(England) ENG	Danny Grieves

No.	Pos.	Nation	Player
—	MF	(England) ENG	Chris Johnson
—	FW	(England) ENG	Colin Simpson
—	MF	(England) ENG	Tommy Smith
