= 2005–06 Coventry City F.C. season =

Coventry City F.C.
2005–2006 season
- Manager: Micky Adams
- Stadium: Ricoh Arena
- Championship: 8th
- FA Cup: 4th round
- League Cup: 2nd round

The 2005–06 season was Coventry City's 86th season in The Football League and their 5th consecutive season in the Football League Championship. Along with competing in the Championship, the club also participated in the FA Cup and Football League Cup. The season covers the period from 1 July 2005 to 30 June 2006.

== Final league table ==
Pos	Team	Pld	W	D	L	GF	GA	GD	Pts	Promotion, qualification or relegation
6	Crystal Palace	46	21	12	13	67	48	+19	75	Qualification for Championship play-offs
7	Wolverhampton Wanderers	46	16	19	11	50	42	+8	67	
8	Coventry City	46	16	15	15	62	65	−3	63	
9	Norwich City	46	18	8	20	56	65	−9	62	
10	Luton Town	46	17	10	19	66	67	−1	61	

Updated to match(es) played on 2 December 2011. Source: RSSSF
Rules for classification: 1) points; 2) goal difference; 3) number of goals scored.

== Results ==
Coventry City's score comes first

=== Legend ===
Win	Draw	Loss

=== Championship ===
Date	Opponent	Venue	Result	Attendance	Scorers
6 August 2005	Norwich City	A	1–1	25,355	Adebola
9 August 2005	Millwall	A	0–0	8,344	
13 August 2005	Burnley	A	0–4	11,683	
20 August 2005	Queens Park Rangers	H	3–0	23,000	Jørgensen, Adebola (2)
27 August 2005	Sheffield United	A	1–2	17,739	Scowcroft
29 August 2005	Southampton	H	1–1	23,000	Scowcroft
10 September 2005	Reading	H	1–1	22,074	Page
14 September 2005	Derby County	A	1–1	21,840	Adebola
17 September 2005	Brighton & Hove Albion	A	2–2	6,529	McShane (own goal), Jørgensen
24 September 2005	Hull City	H	0–2	21,161	
28 September 2005	Watford	H	3–1	16,978	Adebola, Flood, McSheffrey
1 October 2005	Sheffield Wednesday	A	2–3	22,732	McSheffrey, Morrell
15 October 2005	Crystal Palace	H	1–4	24,438	Heath
18 October 2005	Ipswich Town	A	2–2	22,656	McSheffrey, Nalis
23 October 2005	Leicester City	A	1–2	22,991	McSheffrey
29 October 2005	Luton Town	H	1–0	22,228	Adebola
2 November 2005	Stoke City	H	1–2	16,617	Nalis
6 November 2005	Cardiff City	A	0–0	11,424	
19 November 2005	Ipswich Town	H	1–1	18,316	McSheffrey
22 November 2005	Crystal Palace	A	0–2	17,343	
26 November 2005	Norwich City	H	2–2	20,433	McSheffrey, Adebola
3 December 2005	Plymouth Argyle	H	3–1	18,796	Morrell, Hutchison, McSheffrey
10 December 2005	Millwall	H	1–0	16,156	Jørgensen
19 December 2005	Queens Park Rangers	A	1–0	13,556	McSheffrey (pen)
26 December 2005	Leeds United	A	1–3	24,291	Hutchison
28 December 2005	Crewe Alexandra	H	1–1	19,045	Hutchison
31 December 2005	Preston North End	A	1–3	12,936	John
2 January 2006	Wolverhampton Wanderers	H	2–0	26,851	Scowcroft, Lescott (own goal)
14 January 2006	Reading	A	0–2	22,813	
21 January 2006	Derby County	H	6–1	20,267	John (2), Wise, Adebola, McSheffrey (2, 1 pen)
31 January 2006	Hull City	A	2–1	18,381	Wise, John
4 February 2006	Brighton & Hove Albion	H	2–0	20,541	Wise (2)
11 February 2006	Watford	A	0–4	19,842	
15 February 2006	Sheffield Wednesday	H	2–1	20,021	John, McSheffrey
18 February 2006	Plymouth Argyle	A	1–3	8,705	Wise
25 February 2006	Burnley	H	1–0	19,641	Adebola
4 March 2006	Southampton	A	1–1	21,980	Hutchison (pen)
11 March 2006	Sheffield United	H	2–0	23,506	McSheffrey, Adebola
18 March 2006	Leeds United	H	1–1	26,643	McSheffrey
25 March 2006	Crewe Alexandra	A	1–4	6,444	John
1 April 2006	Preston North End	H	0–1	21,023	
8 April 2006	Wolverhampton Wanderers	A	2–2	23,702	John, McSheffrey
15 April 2006	Luton Town	A	2–1	8,752	John, McSheffrey
17 April 2006	Leicester City	H	1–1	26,672	John
22 April 2006	Stoke City	A	1–0	13,385	Adebola
30 April 2006	Cardiff City	H	3–1	22,536	John, Adebola, Wise

=== League Cup ===
Round	Date	Opponent	Venue	Result	Attendance	Goalscorers
R1	24 August 2005	Rushden & Diamonds	A	3–0	3,240	McSheffrey, Heath, Morrell
R2	20 September 2005	Crystal Palace	A	0–1	5,341	

=== FA Cup ===
Round	Date	Opponent	Venue	Result	Attendance	Goalscorers
R3	7 January 2006	Brighton & Hove Albion	A	1–0	6,734	McSheffrey
R4	28 January 2006	Middlesbrough	H	1–1	28,120	John
R4R	8 February 2006	Middlesbrough	A	0–1	14,131	

== Season statistics ==
=== Starts & goals ===
No.	Pos	Nat	Player	Total		Championship		League Cup		FA Cup	
No.	Pos	Nat	Player	Apps	Goals	Apps	Goals	Apps	Goals	Apps	Goals
1	GK	(England) ENG	Stephen Bywater (on loan from West Ham United)	14	0	14	0	0	0	0	0
1	GK	(Hungary) HUN	Márton Fülöp (on loan from Tottenham Hotspur)	33	0	31	0	0	0	2	0
2	DF	(England) ENG	Andy Whing	27	0	24	0	2	0	1	0
3	DF	(England) ENG	Marcus Hall	42	0	38	0	1	0	3	0
4	DF	(Wales) WAL	Rob Page	34	1	32	1	1	0	1	0
5	DF	(Wales) WAL	Ady Williams (on loan to Millwall)	16	0	12	0	1	0	3	0
6	MF	(England) ENG	Stephen Hughes	20	0	18	0	1	0	1	0
7	DF	(Wales) WAL	Richard Duffy (on loan from Portsmouth)	32	0	30	0	0	0	2	0
8	MF	(Republic of Ireland) IRL	Michael Doyle	49	0	44	0	2	0	3	0
9	FW	(Nigeria) NGA	Dele Adebola	42	12	39	12	0	0	3	0
10	FW	(England) ENG	Gary McSheffrey	50	17	45	15	2	1	3	1
11	FW	(England) ENG	James Scowcroft	40	3	37	3	0	0	3	0
12	FW	(England) ENG	Andy Morrell	12	3	10	2	2	1	0	0
13	GK	(Trinidad and Tobago) TRI	Clayton Ince	4	0	1	0	2	0	1	0
14	FW	(Trinidad and Tobago) TRI	Stern John (on loan to Derby County)	25	11	21	10	1	0	3	1
15	MF	(Faroe Islands) FRO	Claus Bech Jørgensen	17	3	15	3	2	0	0	0
16	MF	(England) ENG	Isaac Osbourne	9	0	7	0	2	0	0	0
17	DF	(England) ENG	Matt Heath	24	1	23	1	0	0	1	0
18	MF	(England) ENG	Neil Wood	0	0	0	0	0	0	0	0
19	DF	(England) ENG	Stuart Giddings	1	0	1	0	0	0	0	0
20	DF	(England) ENG	Richard Shaw	26	0	24	0	0	0	2	0
21	MF	(Scotland) SCO	Don Hutchison (on loan from Millwall)	12	4	10	4	0	0	2	0
22	DF	(England) ENG	Paul Watson	2	0	1	0	1	0	0	0
24	DF	(England) ENG	Andy Impey	5	0	4	0	1	0	0	0
25	FW	(France) FRA	Youssef Sofiane	0	0	0	0	0	0	0	0
27	MF	(France) FRA	Lilian Nalis (on loan from Sheffield United)	5	2	5	2	0	0	0	0
28	DF	(Republic of Ireland) IRL	Willo Flood (on loan from Manchester City)	7	1	7	1	0	0	0	0
29	MF	(Republic of Ireland) IRL	Kevin Thornton	4	0	4	0	0	0	0	0
30	FW	(England) ENG	Craig Reid (on loan to Tamworth)	0	0	0	0	0	0	0	0
31	MF	(England) ENG	Luke Webb	0	0	0	0	0	0	0	0
33	GK	(Northern Ireland) NIR	Jonathan Tuffey	0	0	0	0	0	0	0	0
34	MF	(England) ENG	Liam Davis	0	0	0	0	0	0	0	0
36	DF	(England) ENG	Ryan Lynch	0	0	0	0	0	0	0	0
37	DF	(England) ENG	Ben Turner	0	0	0	0	0	0	0	0
38	DF	(England) ENG	Stuart Wall	0	0	0	0	0	0	0	0

Notes:

- Player substitutions are not included.

=== Goalscorers ===
- 12 players have scored for the Coventry City first team during the 2005–06 season.
- 65 goals were scored in total during the 2005–06 season.
  - 60 in the Championship
  - 3 in the League Cup
  - 2 in the FA Cup
- The top goalscorer was Gary McSheffrey with 17 goals.

Name	Championship	League Cup	FA Cup	Total
Gary McSheffrey	15	1	1	17
Dele Adebola	12	0	0	12
Stern John	10	0	1	11
Dennis Wise	6	0	0	6
Don Hutchison	4	0	0	4
Claus Bech Jørgensen	3	0	0	3
Andy Morrell	2	1	0	3
James Scowcroft	3	0	0	3
Lilian Nalis	2	0	0	2
Matt Heath	1	1	0	2
Rob Page	1	0	0	1
Willo Flood	1	0	0	1

=== Yellow Cards ===
- 19 players have been booked for the Coventry City first team during the 2005–06 season.
- 90 bookings were received in total during the 2005–06 season.
  - 81 in the Championship
  - 4 in the League Cup
  - 5 in the FA Cup
- The most booked player was Gary McSheffrey with 11 cards.

Name	Championship	League Cup	FA Cup	Total
Gary McSheffrey	10	1	0	(yellow card) 11
Michael Doyle	9	0	0	(yellow card) 9
Richard Duffy	7	0	1	(yellow card) 8
Rob Page	8	0	0	(yellow card) 8
Dennis Wise	7	0	0	(yellow card) 7
Dele Adebola	4	0	1	(yellow card) 5
Don Hutchison	4	0	1	(yellow card) 5
Stern John	4	1	0	(yellow card) 5
Marcus Hall	3	1	0	(yellow card) 4
Matt Heath	4	0	0	(yellow card) 4
James Scowcroft	3	0	1	(yellow card) 4
Ady Williams	4	0	0	(yellow card) 4
Stephen Hughes	2	0	1	(yellow card) 3
Richard Shaw	3	0	0	(yellow card) 3
Willo Flood	2	0	0	(yellow card) 2
Claus Bech Jørgensen	2	0	0	(yellow card) 2
Isaac Osbourne	1	1	0	(yellow card) 2
Kevin Thornton	2	0	0	(yellow card) 2
Andy Whing	2	0	0	(yellow card) 2

=== Red cards ===
- 4 players were sent off for the Coventry City first team during the 2005–06 season.
- 4 players were sent off in total during the 2005–06 season.
  - 4 in the Championship
  - 0 in the League Cup
  - 0 in the FA Cup
- The most sent off players were Michael Doyle, Matt Heath, Stephen Hughes and Claus Bech Jørgensen all with one sending off.

Name	Championship	League Cup	FA Cup	Total
Michael Doyle	1	0	0	(red card) 1
Matt Heath	1	0	0	(red card) 1
Stephen Hughes	1	0	0	(red card) 1
Claus Bech Jørgensen	1	0	0	(red card) 1

== Transfers ==
=== Transfers in ===
Player	From	Date	Fee
(England) James Scowcroft	Ipswich Town	1 July 2005	Free
(Trinidad and Tobago) Clayton Ince	Crewe Alexandra	1 July 2005	Free
(England) Matt Heath	Leicester City	8 July 2005	Undisclosed
(England) Andy Impey	Nottingham Forest	16 September 2005	Free
(England) Paul Watson	Brighton and Hove Albion	16 September 2005	Free
(France) Youssef Sofiane	West Ham United	14 October 2005	Free
(Scotland) Don Hutchison	Millwall	13 January 2006	Free
(England) Dennis Wise	Southampton	19 January 2006	Free

=== Transfers out ===
Player	To	Date	Fee
(England) Craig Pead	Walsall	27 May 2005	Free
(England) Kevin Pressman	Mansfield Town	1 July 2005	Free
(Jamaica) Trevor Benjamin	Peterborough United	8 July 2005	Free
(Scotland) Scott Shearer	Bristol Rovers	27 July 2005	Free
(Republic of Ireland) Steve Staunton	Walsall	2 August 2005	Free
(England) Paul Watson	Woking	24 November 2005	Free
(England) Richard Brush	Shrewsbury Town	23 December 2005	Free
(France) Youssef Sofiane	La Louvière	5 January 2005	Free

=== Loans in ===
Player	From	Date from	Date until
(Wales) Richard Duffy	Portsmouth	1 July 2005	1 May 2006
(England) Stephen Bywater	West Ham United	3 August 2005	20 October 2005
(Republic of Ireland) Willo Flood	Manchester City	18 August 2005	18 November 2005
(France) Lilian Nalis	Sheffield United	14 October 2005	14 November 2005
(Hungary) Márton Fülöp	Tottenham Hotspur	28 October 2005	1 May 2006
(Scotland) Don Hutchison	Millwall	24 November 2005	12 January 2006

=== Loans out ===
Player	To	Date from	Date until
(Republic of Ireland) Graham Barrett	Livingston	31 August 2005	1 January 2006
(Wales) Ady Williams	Millwall	12 September 2005	4 December 2005
(Trinidad and Tobago) Stern John	Derby County	16 September 2005	16 November 2005
(England) Craig Reid	Tamworth	17 March 2006	17 April 2006
