= Rob Page =

Welsh football manager & player (born 1974)

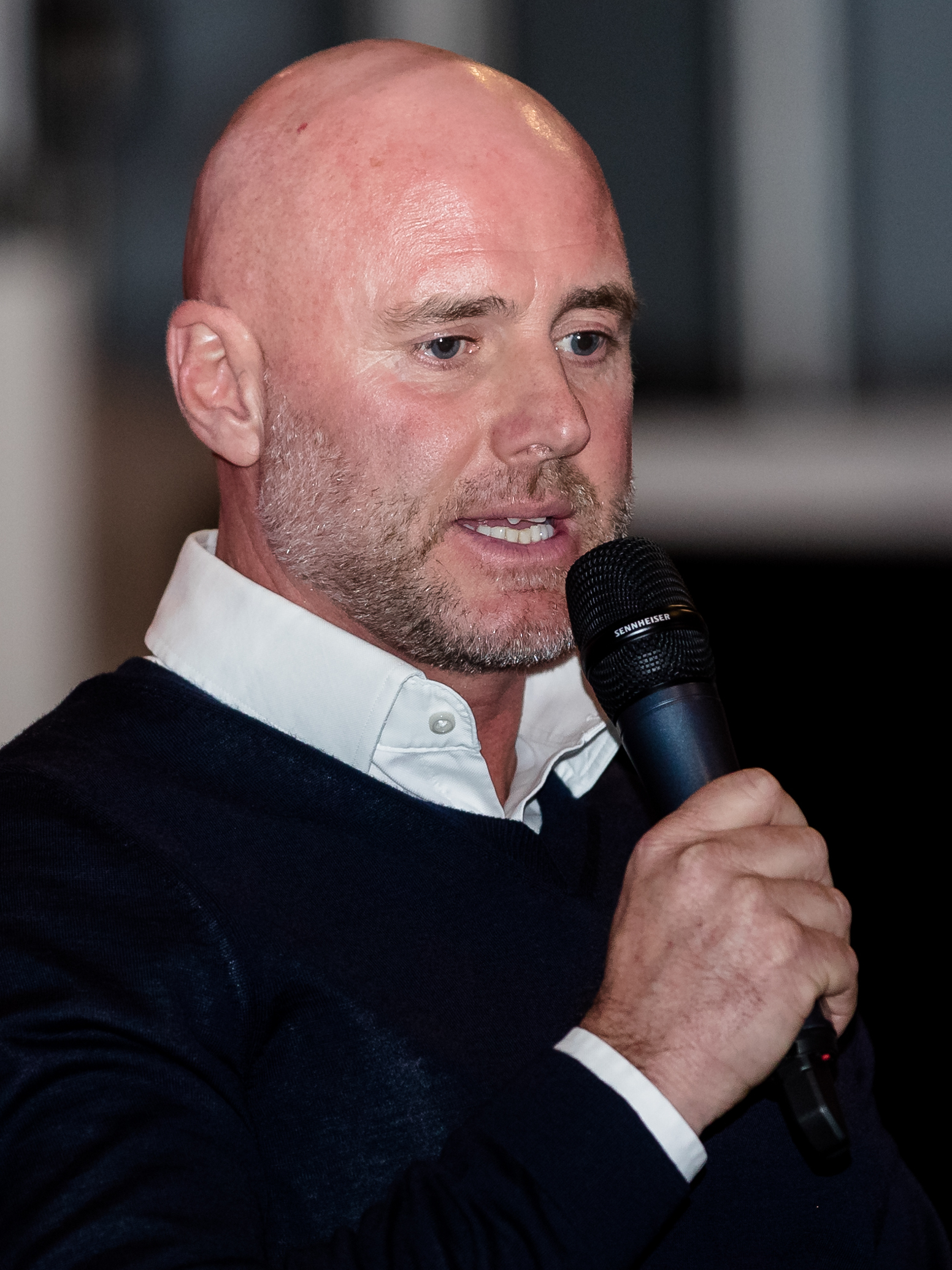
- Page in 2023

Personal information
- Full name: Robert John Page
- Date of birth: 3 September 1974 (age 52)
- Place of birth: Llwynypia, Wales
- Height: 6 ft 0 in (1.83 m)
- Position: Defender

Team information
- Current team: Liverpool U21 (manager)

Youth career
- 1985–1993: Watford

Senior career*
Years	Team	Apps	(Gls)
1993–2001	Watford	216	(2)
2001	→ Sheffield United (loan)	3	(0)
2001–2004	Sheffield United	104	(1)
2004–2005	Cardiff City	9	(0)
2005–2008	Coventry City	70	(1)
2008	Huddersfield Town	18	(1)
2008–2011	Chesterfield	56	(1)
Total		476	(6)

International career
1991–1992	Wales U18	6	(0)
1994–1995	Wales U21	6	(0)
1996–2005	Wales	41	(0)
1999	Wales B	1	(0)

Managerial career
- 2014–2016: Port Vale
- 2016–2017: Northampton Town
- 2017–2019: Wales U21
- 2020–2024: Wales
- 2025–: Liverpool U21
- * Club domestic league appearances and goals

Robert John Page (born 3 September 1974) is a Welsh football manager and former player who is the manager of the Liverpool U21 team. In an 18-year career in the Premier League and the English Football League, he made 543 competitive appearances for six clubs. He captained a team and scored a goal in each of the top four divisions of English football. He also gained 41 caps for Wales in a ten-year international career, captaining the side once, before he retired from international football in September 2006.

A defender, he began his career with Watford in 1993, whom he would captain to two promotions, winning the Second Division title in 1997–98 and the First Division play-off final in 1999. He went on to be voted the club's Player of the Season in their 1999–2000 FA Premier League campaign. He was sold to Sheffield United for a £350,000 fee in September 2001 and helped the club to reach the First Division play-off final in 2003, as well the semi-finals of the FA Cup and League Cup. He signed with Cardiff City in July 2004 before moving on to Coventry City in February 2005. He joined Huddersfield Town in January 2008 before moving on to Chesterfield in May 2008 and announcing his retirement in March 2011.

He worked as a coach at Port Vale for three years before he was appointed as manager, initially on a caretaker basis, in September 2014. In May 2016, he was appointed manager of Northampton Town on a three-year contract, but was sacked in January 2017. He was appointed Wales under-21 manager two months later before becoming assistant manager for the senior team, led by Ryan Giggs, in August 2019. He became the team's caretaker manager in November 2020, when Giggs was suspended from duty, and oversaw two victories in the UEFA Nations League that secured Wales promotion into League A. He coached Wales at UEFA Euro 2020, where they would reach the Round of 16. In June 2022, he led Wales to qualification for the 2022 FIFA World Cup, the country's first World Cup appearance since 1958. He was sacked in June 2024 after a series of disappointing results. He joined Liverpool as under-21s manager in June 2025.

== Early life ==
Robert John Page was born in Llwynypia Hospital on 3 September 1974 and grew up in the nearby village of Tylorstown, Wales.

== Playing career ==
=== Watford ===
Page started his professional career at Watford in 1993, having been with the club since 11. He established himself as a key member of the first-team under manager Kenny Jackett, playing 42 games in the 1996–97 campaign. His first major feat with the club came in the 1997–98 season when new manager Graham Taylor appointed Page as captain and led the "Hornets" to the Second Division title. He made 49 appearances in league and cup competitions. He ensured the "Hornets" earned a vital point at second-place Bristol City in his final game of the season. Dropped at the start of the 1998–99 season in favour of Dean Yates, he soon was returned to the starting eleven alongside centre-back partner Steve Palmer. He made 42 First Division appearances to help Watford finish fifth-place. After defeating Birmingham City in the play-off semi-finals, Page marshalled the Watford defence to a clean sheet in the final, as Watford defeated Bolton Wanderers 2–0 to win a place in the Premier League. Page was named Watford's Player of the Season for the 1999–2000 campaign.

As expected, Watford were relegated at the end of their maiden season in the Premier League. However, Page did play in some memorable moments for the club, including a 1–0 victory over Liverpool at Anfield and another 1–0 victory over Chelsea at Vicarage Road. He also scored against Sheffield Wednesday to win the club a point at Hillsborough. Page was also voted Watford Player of the Season. He remained with Watford for the 2000–01 campaign, making 42 appearances in league and cup competitions. In May 2001, in one of his first acts as manager, Gianluca Vialli transfer listed Page, demanding a £1 million fee from prospective clubs.

=== Sheffield United ===
He was loaned out to First Division rivals Sheffield United in August 2001, before moving to Bramall Lane permanently the next month for a £350,000 fee. He made 45 appearances for the club in the 2001–02 campaign. The next season he captained the "Blades" to a third-place finish. He played in the club's play-off semi-final victory over Nottingham Forest but was powerless to stop Wolverhampton Wanderers winning 3–0 in the final at the Millennium Stadium. He recovered from an ankle injury to make 35 appearances in 2003–04, as United finish two points outside of the play-off zone.

=== Cardiff City ===
He moved to Championship rivals Cardiff City on a free transfer in July 2004. Finding himself on the bench under manager Lennie Lawrence, he left Ninian Park in February 2005 after making only nine appearances. His first-team opportunities were limited by the fine centre-back partnership of Danny Gabbidon and James Collins.

=== Coventry City ===
Coventry City manager Micky Adams signed Page in February 2005. Page was soon struck down with a knee injury. In September 2005 he was handed a three-match suspension by The Football Association after fighting with Southampton defender Darren Powell. He made 34 appearances in the 2005–06 season, as Coventry finished mid-table in the Championship. At the end of the campaign, he underwent major hip surgery.

Page signed an extended contract in September 2006, and was appointed as club captain in November, though his contribution was more limited in the 2006–07 season as he picked up ten bookings in his 29 league appearances. He also hit the headlines for all the wrong reasons in January 2007, after he and vice-captain Michael Doyle injured each other after fighting each other on the club's training ground following a hard tackle from Doyle on Chris Birchall. Page was then frozen out of the first-team by new manager Iain Dowie. After just two appearances in the first half of the 2007–08 season, he left the Ricoh Arena in the January transfer window.

=== Huddersfield Town ===
In January 2008, he joined Huddersfield Town in League One as manager Andy Ritchie wanted to add experience to his young defensive back line. On 26 January, he made his Town debut in an FA Cup fourth round win at Oldham Athletic. He made his Town league debut three days later in a 1–0 win over AFC Bournemouth at the Galpharm Stadium. In his four games for Huddersfield, the "Terriers" recorded four wins and four clean sheets. He scored his first goal for the club in their FA Cup defeat against Carlisle United at Brunton Park on 12 February 2008. Following Ritchie's departure as manager, caretaker manager Gerry Murphy made Page captain of the team until the end of the season, replacing previous captain Jon Worthington. New manager Stan Ternent entered negotiations to offer Page a new contract in the summer, but after Page left the club before a contract was offered Ternent told the press that "he's certainly replaceable".

=== Chesterfield ===
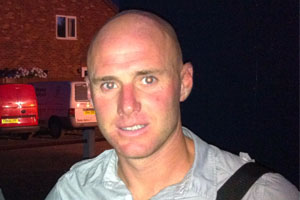
Page with Chesterfield after a pre-season friendly in 2010

In May 2008, Page signed with League Two side Chesterfield. Manager Lee Richardson initially appointed Page as club captain, but after a string of poor performances and a red card at Dagenham & Redbridge, Page was dropped from the squad and his captaincy was relinquished. By the end of the season he made just 18 starts, and Richardson announced he was willing to listen to offers for the player.

In July 2009, Page was offered a player-coach role at Port Vale under Micky Adams, but he decided to stay at Chesterfield. Richardson was relieved of his duties in the summer of 2009, and his replacement, John Sheridan brought Ian Breckin to the club, who formed a strong early defensive partnership with Page. He played 42 games in the 2009–10 campaign. After an Achilles tendon injury limited Page to just two appearances in the 2010–11 season, he was released by the club in March 2011.

== International career ==
Page represented Wales, gaining 41 caps, captaining the side once. He said that captaining Wales to a 2–0 victory over Hungary in February 2005 was the proudest moment of his career. He retired from international football in September 2006, at the age of 32, citing a wish to see more of his young family. He decided to retire days after being recalled to the Wales squad by manager John Toshack for the Euro 2008 qualifiers.

== Management career ==
=== Port Vale ===
In July 2011, Micky Adams again offered Page a coaching role at League Two club Port Vale. Page accepted and was given a role in the club's youth set-up. He was promoted to first-team coach in May 2012, following the retirement of Geoff Horsfield. In October 2012, Page was named as the bookmaker's favourite to become the next AFC Wimbledon manager. The job instead went to Neal Ardley. In May 2013, Page was reported to be one of two names considered for the vacant management position at former club Sheffield United; However, David Weir was instead appointed as manager. At the end of the 2012–13 season Port Vale were promoted into League One. On 22 September 2013, Page was put in temporary charge of first-team affairs at Vale Park after Micky Adams decided to take time off work to have hip replacement surgery. In his first match in charge the "Valiants" recorded a 1–0 win over Tranmere Rovers at Prenton Park.

He was promoted to the role of assistant manager in July 2014. He was appointed caretaker manager following Adams' resignation on 18 September 2014 and was initially given "until the end of October" to prove his capabilities as manager. He won his first game in charge at Vale Park two days later after a late Mark Marshall goal gave the Vale a 2–1 victory over Barnsley. He made his first two signings at the end of the month, bringing in defenders Stéphane Zubar and Reiss Greenidge on loan. In October he made his first permanent signing, bringing in free agent striker Dany N'Guessan on a two-month contract. Having taken the club up seven league places within six weeks he was appointed as manager on a permanent basis on 29 October. He introduced a more possession-based style to the club, relying less on direct football. He was nominated for the League One Manager of the Month award in February after overseeing a run of three successive clean sheet victories in the club's six games. Following this the club went on a run of just one win in eleven games, but still finished above the relegation zone. He signed a new two-year contract in May 2015.

Page needed to avoid a poor start to the 2015–16 season as chairman Norman Smurthwaite warned he was prepared to make "ruthless decisions" if the club were struggling by September. Page made nine new signings during pre-season – Sam Kelly, Sam Foley, Anthony Grant, Ben Purkiss, Remie Streete, A-Jay Leitch-Smith, Jak Alnwick, Uche Ikpeazu and Ryan Inniss – citing the need to sign players who "desire success". He was nominated for the League One Manager of the Month award in November following a sequence of three wins out of four which moved Vale to the fringes of the promotion race. However, a defeat to League Two side Exeter City in the second round of the FA Cup brought speculation over Page's future as manager. He retained his position, however, and was named as Football League manager of the week after his side overcame a 2–0 half-time deficit to beat Peterborough United 3–2 on 12 March. He led the club to a 12th-place finish he was linked with various management vacancies in the summer.

=== Northampton Town ===
On 19 May 2016, Page joined Northampton Town as their new manager on a three-year contract; Northampton had just won promotion into League One as champions of League Two. He stated that he saw Northampton as "the next step for me and something I'm really looking forward to", and cited the positivity of chairman Kelvin Thomas as a major factor in his decision to join the club. The Cobblers went unbeaten in his first six games in charge and Page was named as EFL manager of the week after overseeing a 3–2 win over Milton Keynes Dons at Sixfields. The unbeaten run also included a penalty shoot-out victory over Premier League side West Bromwich Albion in the second round of the EFL Cup. Northampton's reward for eliminating West Brom was a home tie with Manchester United. However, he apologised for stating that it was "men against girls" after his side slumped to a ninth defeat in eleven games with a 5–0 defeat to Bristol Rovers on 7 January. He was sacked two days later, with Northampton 16th in League One and eliminated from the FA Cup by non-League Stourbridge.

=== Wales ===
Page began coaching at Nottingham Forest in January 2017. He was appointed manager of the Wales under-21 team on 15 March 2017, signing a four-year deal. He was also put in charge of the under-17 and under-19 teams, and stood down from his position as a coach at Nottingham Forest. In August 2019, Page was appointed assistant coach to the senior Wales squad under manager Ryan Giggs, taking the place of Osian Roberts. His organisational skills were credited with an improvement in the team's defence.

Page became the caretaker manager of the Wales senior team on 3 November 2020, following Giggs's arrest. Page oversaw a 0–0 draw with the United States in a friendly, as well as UEFA Nations League wins over the Republic of Ireland and Finland that secured Wales promotion out of League B as winners of Group 4. With Giggs on extended leave, Page continued to deputise in his place for the three international games in March 2021. After Giggs was charged with assault in April 2021, it was confirmed that Page would manage Wales at the delayed UEFA Euro 2020 finals. Wales qualified out of Group A in second-place with a 1–1 draw with Switzerland, 2–0 win over Turkey and 1–0 defeat to Italy. They went on to be eliminated at the Round of 16 stage following a 4–0 defeat to Denmark.

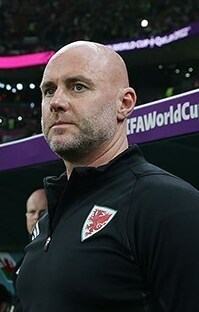
Page as manager of Wales at the 2022 FIFA World Cup

For 2022 World Cup qualification, Wales were drawn in Group E with Belgium, Czech Republic, Belarus and Estonia with Page again acting as interim manager. Wales finished second in Group E and progressed to the qualification play-off stage. On 5 June 2022, Page led Wales to a 1–0 win over Ukraine in the European qualification play-off final, to qualify for the 2022 FIFA World Cup, the country's first World Cup appearance since 1958. 15 days later, Giggs resigned ahead of his trial, making Page the permanent manager until the end of the World Cup. In September 2022, Page signed a four-year contract with the Football Association of Wales. Wales were eliminated from the World Cup in the group stage, having won just one point; they came from behind to earn a draw against the United States, before losing 2–0 to Iran and 3–0 to England. Page said that his team had failed to show their "true colours" in Qatar.

Wales were relegated from League A at the end of the 2022–23 UEFA Nations League campaign as they finished behind the Netherlands, Belgium and Poland with one point gained from six games. They then finished third in their group for UEFA Euro 2024 qualifying, behind Turkey and Croatia, and were placed in Path A of the qualifying play-offs. A 4–1 victory over Finland in the semi-finals took them into the final at the Cardiff City Stadium. However, they were eliminated after losing to Poland in a penalty shoot-out, which was the nation's first competitive penalty shoot-out. He came under further pressure in June 2024 following a goalless draw with Gibraltar and heavy defeat to Slovakia. On 21 June, The FAW announced that Page's contract had been terminated. Page later said it was hard to come to terms with his sacking.

=== Liverpool U21 ===
On 24 June 2025, Page joined Liverpool as under-21s manager.

== Style of management ==
Speaking in December 2015, Page described his preferred tactics as including attacking full-backs playing high up the pitch, a defensive midfielder allied to a more attacking central midfielder, and pace in the forward positions and on the wings.

== Career statistics ==
=== Club playing statistics ===
Appearances and goals by club, season and competition
Club	Season	League			FA Cup		League Cup		Other		Total	
Club	Season	Division	Apps	Goals	Apps	Goals	Apps	Goals	Apps	Goals	Apps	Goals
Watford	1993–94	First Division	4	0	0	0	0	0	—		4	0
Watford	1994–95	First Division	5	0	1	0	0	0	—		6	0
Watford	1995–96	First Division	19	0	1	0	0	0	—		20	0
Watford	1996–97	Second Division	36	0	2	0	4	0	0	0	42	0
Watford	1997–98	Second Division	41	0	4	0	4	0	0	0	49	0
Watford	1998–99	First Division	39	0	1	0	1	0	3	0	44	0
Watford	1999–2000	Premier League	36	1	1	0	3	0	—		40	1
Watford	2000–01	First Division	36	1	1	0	5	0	—		42	1
Watford	2001–02	First Division	0	0	0	0	0	0	—		0	0
Watford	Total		216	2	11	0	17	0	3	0	247	2
Sheffield United	2001–02	First Division	43	0	2	0	0	0	—		45	0
Sheffield United	2002–03	First Division	34	0	5	0	6	0	3	0	48	0
Sheffield United	2003–04	First Division	30	1	4	0	1	0	—		35	1
Sheffield United	Total		107	1	11	0	7	0	3	0	128	1
Cardiff City	2004–05	Championship	9	0	0	0	0	0	—		9	0
Coventry City	2004–05	Championship	9	0	—		—		—		9	0
Coventry City	2005–06	Championship	32	1	1	0	1	0	—		34	1
Coventry City	2006–07	Championship	29	0	2	0	0	0	—		31	0
Coventry City	2007–08	Championship	0	0	0	0	2	0	—		2	0
Coventry City	Total		70	1	3	0	3	0	0	0	76	1
Huddersfield Town	2007–08	League One	18	1	2	0	—		—		20	1
Chesterfield	2008–09	League Two	16	0	1	0	1	0	1	0	19	0
Chesterfield	2009–10	League Two	39	1	0	0	0	0	3	0	42	1
Chesterfield	2010–11	League Two	1	0	0	0	1	0	0	0	2	0
Chesterfield	Total		56	1	1	0	2	0	4	0	63	1
Career total			476	6	28	0	29	0	10	0	543	6

=== International playing statistics ===
Appearances and goals by national team and year
Wales national team
Year	Apps	Goals
1996	1	0
1997	5	0
1999	3	0
2000	7	0
2001	6	0
2002	4	0
2003	5	0
2004	4	0
2005	6	0
Total	41	0

=== Managerial statistics ===
As of match played 31 August 2025

Managerial record by team and tenure
Team	From	To	Record					Ref
Team	From	To	P	W	D	L	Win %	Ref
Port Vale	18 September 2014	19 May 2016	93	35	20	38	37.6	
Northampton Town	19 May 2016	9 January 2017	34	10	8	16	29.4	
Wales U21	15 March 2017	21 August 2019	15	5	5	5	33.3	
Wales	3 November 2020	21 June 2024	45	15	16	14	33.3	
Liverpool FC U21	25 June 2025	Present	3	1	0	2	33.3	
Total			190	66	49	75	34.7	

== Honours ==
Watford

- Football League First Division play-offs: 1999
- Football League Second Division: 1997–98

Individual

- Watford Player of the Season: 1999–2000
