= Kevin Phillips (English footballer) =

English footballer (born 1973)

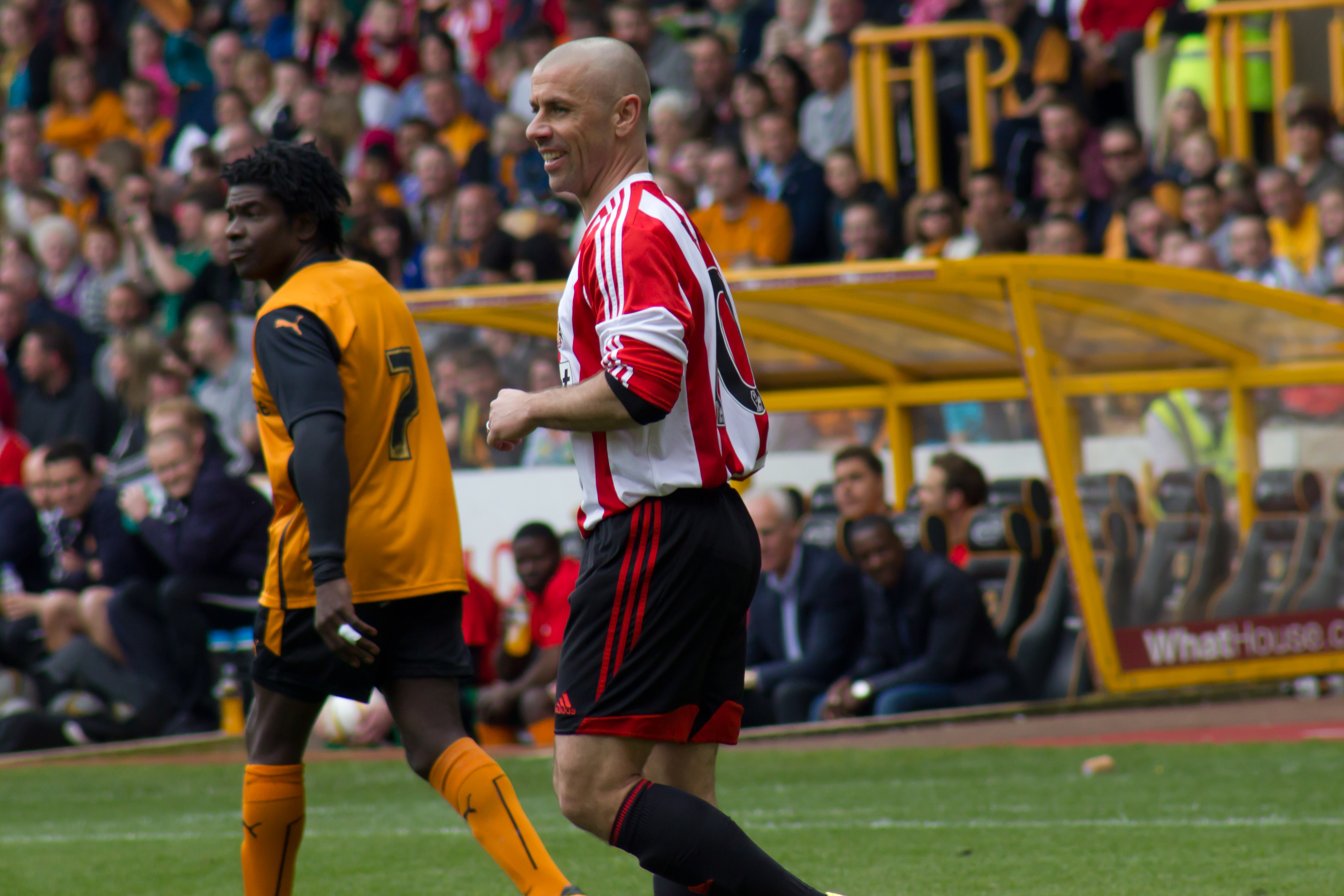
- Phillips playing in Jody Craddock's testimonial match, 2014

Personal information
- Full name: Kevin Mark Phillips
- Date of birth: 25 July 1973 (age 53)
- Place of birth: Hitchin, Hertfordshire, England
- Height: 5 ft 7 in (1.70 m)
- Position: Striker

Youth career
- 1985–1991: Southampton

Senior career*
Years	Team	Apps	(Gls)
1991–1994	Baldock Town		
1994–1997	Watford	59	(24)
1997–2003	Sunderland	208	(113)
2003–2005	Southampton (Note: According to Soccerbase, Phillips scored 13 Premier League goals for Southampton in the 2003–04 season. However, the Premier League, Southampton F.C. and the Sky Sports Football Yearbook give him 12, and both Neil Brown and the 2005–06 PFA Footballers Who's Who have a total of 22, consistent with 12 in 2003–04. This figure is also consistent with the goal scored on 27 March 2010 being, as widely reported, his 250th senior career goal. The discrepancy arises from a disputed goal in Southampton's 3–2 defeat at Old Trafford on 31 January 2004, which was widely credited to Brett Ormerod but for which Phillips is named as the scorer by Soccerbase.)	64	(22)
2005–2006	Aston Villa	23	(4)
2006–2008	West Bromwich Albion	71	(38)
2008–2011	Birmingham City	69	(19)
2011–2013	Blackpool	56	(18)
2013	→ Crystal Palace (loan)	14	(6)
2013–2014	Crystal Palace	4	(0)
2014	Leicester City	12	(2)
Total		580	(246)

International career
1998	England B	1	(0)
1999–2002	England	8	(0)

Managerial career
- 2022–2023: South Shields
- 2024: Hartlepool United
- 2024–2025: AFC Fylde
- * Club domestic league appearances and goals

Kevin Mark Phillips (born 25 July 1973) is an English former professional footballer who was most recently the head coach of National League club AFC Fylde.

A striker, Phillips started his career with Southampton but failed to make the first team and was released. He then signed for non-League side Baldock Town where he impressed, earning a move to Watford in 1994. In 1997, Phillips signed for First Division club Sunderland. In his first season he scored 35 goals in all competitions, the most goals in a season for a Sunderland player since the Second World War as well as being the league's top goalscorer. Phillips scored 23 goals in 26 league games in the following season as Sunderland were crowned champions of the First Division. He received his first call up to the England national team in 1999. In the 1999–2000 season, Phillips scored 30 Premier League goals to earn himself a place in the PFA Team of the Year. This goal tally earned him the Golden Boot award as well as the European Golden Shoe. He was the first Englishman to have won the award. Phillips was named in the squad for UEFA Euro 2000 although he made no appearances at the finals. He made his eighth and final appearance for England in 2002. Phillips spent a further three seasons with the Wearside club, making 235 appearances and scoring 130 goals before departing for Southampton in 2003 following Sunderland's relegation.

After two seasons with Southampton and one with Aston Villa, Phillips signed for Championship club West Bromwich Albion. In his second season with West Brom, Phillips was a member of the team that won the league with him being named as the Championship Player of the Season. In 2008, he signed for fellow West Midlands club Birmingham City where he won the League Cup in his third season. He spent two seasons with Championship club Blackpool before moving to Crystal Palace initially on loan. With Palace, Phillips scored the winning penalty in the play-off final against his former club Watford to earn promotion to the Premier League. In January 2014, Phillips signed for Leicester City who won the Championship title. He retired at the end of the 2013–14 season.

He began his coaching career with his last club Leicester City as their assistant first team coach. After other coaching roles with Derby County and Stoke City, he began his managerial career with South Shields. With South Shields, he won the Northern Premier League title in his second season before leaving at the end of the season. In January 2024, he was confirmed as the new manager of Hartlepool United.

== Club career ==
=== Early career ===
Phillips was born in Hitchin, Hertfordshire. He started his footballing career as a trainee with Southampton, where he spent six years, four as a schoolboy, before being taken on as an apprentice in 1989. As a youth, Phillips was considered to be too small to play up front and was played at right back, in which position he made two reserve team appearances in 1990. He failed to make the grade at Southampton and was released by manager Chris Nicholl, and returned to Hertfordshire where he signed for non-League semi-professional side Baldock Town in the summer of 1991.

At Baldock Town, he was initially played as a defender until an injury crisis resulted in manager Ian Allinson playing Phillips as a striker, scoring twice in his first match in his new role. He was signed by Watford in December 1994 for an initial £10,000, plus four additional payments of £5,000.

=== Watford ===
Phillips established himself in the squad during the second half of the 1994–95 season, and played regularly before suffering a foot injury in March 1996, initially diagnosed as a hairline fracture and later discovered to be a hole in a ligament in his foot, that kept him out for a year. Watford were relegated from Division One in 1995–96, and by the time Phillips returned to the team, they were in the top half of Division Two, and went on to finish 13th. In July 1997, Phillips signed for Sunderland for a fee of £325,000, potentially rising to more than £600,000.

=== Sunderland ===
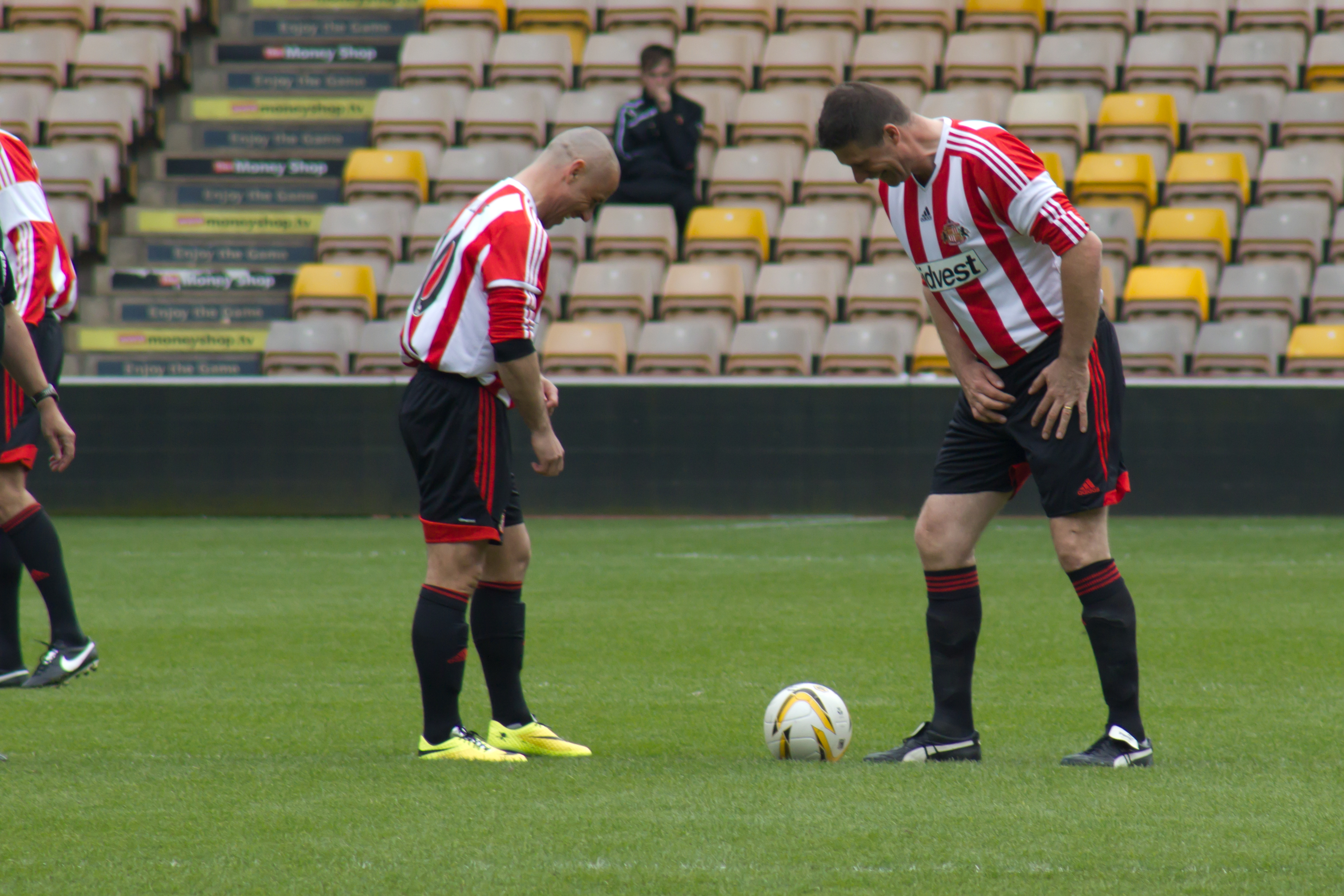
While at Sunderland, Phillips is best remembered for his partnership with fellow striker Niall Quinn, resulting in him winning the Premier League Golden Boot and European Golden Shoe in 2000

Phillips signed for Sunderland just after their relegation from the Premiership. Fifteen matches into the Division One season, the club were in mid-table and Phillips had four goals. In the remainder of the season, Phillips set or equalled club records by scoring in seven consecutive matches and in nine consecutive home matches, became the first Sunderland player since Brian Clough in 1961–62 to score 30 goals in a season, and finished the campaign with 35 goals in all competitions, the most by any Sunderland player in one season since the Second World War. His tally included a four-goal haul in the third round of the FA Cup at Rotherham United and two goals in the play-off campaign. After scoring Sunderland's second goal in the play-off final, Phillips was substituted after 73 minutes with an injury, so missed the remainder of the 4–4 draw with Charlton Athletic which Sunderland lost 7–6 on penalties. Phillips later described the final as his "most disappointing day in football", but also as the best match he had ever played in.

Phillips scored eight goals in the opening weeks of the 1998–99 season as Sunderland reached the top of the Division One table. A broken toe sustained in a League Cup tie against Chester City in mid-September kept him out for nearly four months, but his goalscoring resumed immediately upon his return, with a "screaming volley" away to Queens Park Rangers. Promotion was confirmed in April as Phillips scored four of Sunderland's five goals in an away game against Bury, and he ended the season with 23 goals from only 26 league games, and 25 goals in all competitions. His form earned him an international call-up for England, and he made his debut in the starting eleven in a friendly against Hungary.

In the run-up to the start of the 1999–2000 FA Premier League season, pundit Rodney Marsh predicted that Phillips would struggle to get more than five or six goals at the higher level. Forming a potent "little and large" strike pairing with veteran target-man Niall Quinn, Phillips scored his sixth goal on 18 September – the first of a hat-trick against Derby County – and was named Premier League Player of the Month for October. His goal tally was 20 by mid-January and 30 by the season's end, a total that earned him not only the Premier League Golden Boot but also the European Golden Shoe award – he was the first Englishman to have won the latter and held the distinction until Harry Kane won the honour in 2024 – and with a 14-goal return from Quinn contributed to Sunderland's seventh-place finish, just missing out on a UEFA Cup place.

In January 2001, Phillips scored his 104th goal for Sunderland, breaking the club's post-war goalscoring record. As the season wore on, Phillips suffered both a lack of form and disciplinary problems: he scored only once between mid-January and May, and came in for criticism from fans and local press. He finished the season with 18 goals in all competitions, 14 in the league, as Sunderland again finished seventh and missed out on UEFA Cup qualification.

Phillips' goals contribution to Sunderland's 2001–02 season fell to 13, of which 11 came in the league. He relinquished his penalty-taking duties, after three consecutive spot-kicks were saved, but his goal on the final day of the season, in a 1–1 draw with Derby County, was enough to ensure 17th place and Premier League survival. He played the last months of the campaign despite a groin problem which required surgery over the 2002 close season.

Amid interest from clubs including Arsenal and Tottenham Hotspur, Phillips "pledged his future" to Sunderland ahead of the 2002–03 season, though he later confirmed he had submitted a transfer request in August. Manager Peter Reid brought in strikers Tore André Flo and Marcus Stewart, and warned Phillips he was no longer an automatic first choice. Phillips in fact started 32 of the 38 league matches, but scored only 6 goals as the club were relegated with just four wins and what were then Premier League record lows of 19 points and 21 goals. A second transfer request was rejected in January, but at the end of the season Phillips confirmed that the club's need to reduce its expenditure in light of relegation meant that he would be leaving. He had played in 235 matches for Sunderland, and scored 130 goals at an average of better than a goal every two games.

=== Southampton ===
In August 2003, following Sunderland's relegation from the Premier League, Phillips moved to the south coast to join Southampton for a fee of £3.25 million, with Phillips signing a four-year contract, while taking a substantial cut in his salary.

He made his debut on 16 August, coming on as a substitute away to Leicester City and scoring with a long-range strike in a 2–2 draw. His next goal came at White Hart Lane on 20 September when the ball ricocheted in off him from an attempted clearance by Tottenham Hotspur's Anthony Gardner. This was followed in mid-week by the equalising goal in a 1–1 draw with Steaua Bucharest in the UEFA Cup First round. On the following Saturday, Phillips was sent off in the final minute of a bad-tempered 1–0 defeat to Middlesbrough, after he kicked out at Boro defender Franck Queudrue.

Phillips then failed to score for over three months until his fourth goal of the season came in a 2–1 victory over Leeds United on 17 January 2004. There then followed a rich run of form with Phillips netting ten further goals in the final four months of the season including two goals in the matches at Manchester United, Wolverhampton Wanderers and Manchester City. Phillips ended the 2003–04 season with 13 goals in total, from 37 appearances.

In March 2004, manager Gordon Strachan had resigned to be replaced by Paul Sturrock who was dismissed shortly after the start of the 2004–05 season, to be replaced in turn by Steve Wigley who spent just three months in charge before the arrival of Harry Redknapp from local rivals Portsmouth in December. Phillips had now played under four managers within a year.

Despite the frequent changes in manager, Phillips continued to score regularly in his partnership with new signing Peter Crouch. He managed ten league goals in 2004–05, including two in a 3–3 draw with Fulham on 5 January. Despite Phillips's goals, the club finished at the bottom of the table and were relegated after 27 years in the top flight. On 29 June 2005, Phillips departed from Southampton after two years and 22 league goals to join Aston Villa in a £1 million deal.

=== Aston Villa ===
Phillips signed a two-year contract with Premier League club Aston Villa for a fee of £1 million on 29 June 2005. He scored just four minutes into his Villa debut, and then returned from injury to seal Villa's first Premier League defeat of local rivals Birmingham City in seven attempts. Phillips shared front-man duties with Juan Pablo Ángel and fellow new signing Milan Baroš, but illness and further injuries disrupted his season, in which he contributed only five goals. He began the 2006–07 season with Villa, but on 22 August, he signed for West Bromwich Albion of the Championship for a £700,000 fee.

=== West Bromwich Albion ===
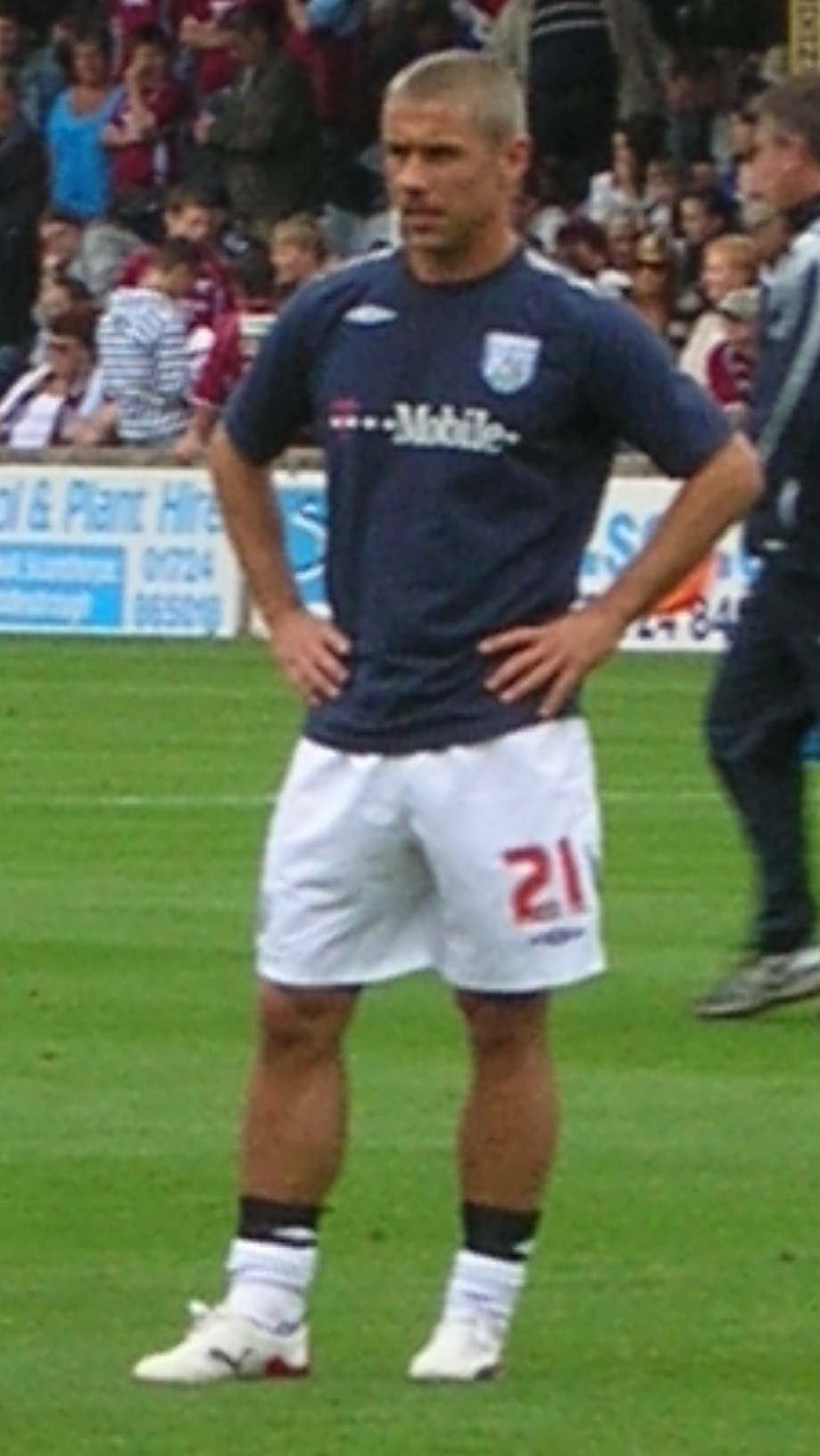
Phillips warming up for West Bromwich Albion in 2007

Phillips joined West Bromwich Albion despite strong interest from Sunderland, where his former strike partner Niall Quinn had recently become both chairman and manager. He cited a reluctance to move his family and home for a third time in three years as a major factor in his decision. He scored 22 goals in his first season with West Brom, including two hat-tricks, one in a 5–1 win at Ipswich Town and the second in a 7–0 defeat of Barnsley on the final day of the regular season that confirmed Albion's place in the play-offs. Phillips scored twice in the first leg of the play-off semi-final against Wolverhampton Wanderers, and headed the only goal of the second leg to ensure their progression to the final, in which they lost 1–0 to Derby County.

He missed six weeks of the 2007–08 season because of a knee injury sustained in early November, but rediscovered his goalscoring form on his return to win the Championship player-of-the-month award for December. Described by Albion manager Tony Mowbray as "a natural goal-scorer with great awareness and vision", Phillips scored his 200th League goal in a 1–1 draw with Crystal Palace on 13 March 2008. For the last match of the season, away to Queens Park Rangers, fans of West Bromwich Albion chose to dress up as superheroes in honour of Phillips, who is nicknamed "Super Kev"; Albion won the match 2–0 to win promotion to the Premier League as champions. Phillips won numerous awards over the season. He received Player-of-the-Year awards from both the West Bromwich Albion Supporters Club and from the club itself, after scoring 24 goals from 30 starts and finishing as the Championship's second top goalscorer. At national level, he was chosen Championship Player of the Year at the annual Football League Awards, ahead of Andy Gray of Charlton Athletic and Michael Kightly of Wolverhampton Wanderers, and, together with teammates Paul Robinson and Jonathan Greening, was named in the PFA Championship Team of the Year.

=== Birmingham City ===
When his contract with West Bromwich Albion expired at the end of the 2007–08 season, the club offered Phillips a one-year deal, with an additional second year if he made 19 or more league appearances. He rejected the offer, preferring to sign a two-year contract with Birmingham City, newly relegated from the Premier League. He made his debut on the opening day of the 2008–09 season against Sheffield United, coming on as a substitute to score a stoppage time winner in a 1–0 victory. Phillips continued his scoring run with goals in his next two games, against Southampton and Barnsley, "lashed in a stinging low drive" against Reading that earned him the club's Goal of the Season award, and finished the season with 14 goals in all competitions. His 14th, to take a two-goal lead in a 2–1 win against promotion rivals Reading on the last day of the season, ensured Birmingham's return to the Premier League after just one season in the Championship.

At 36, Phillips recognised he would play a reduced role at the higher level. In a season when manager Alex McLeish relied on consistency in team selection – Birmingham set a Premier League record of nine consecutive matches with the same starting eleven, and a club record twelve-match unbeaten run in the top flight – he started only twice, but came on as substitute in 17 games. He scored only four goals, but those goals contributed four points to the club's highest finish for more than 50 years. Against Wolverhampton Wanderers, he came off the bench to score twice in the last ten minutes and win the game, and on 27 March 2010, 1–0 down at home to Arsenal, a 92nd-minute clearance by Bacary Sagna deflected off Phillips' face via the goalkeeper into the net for his 250th career goal.

He signed a one-year contract extension ahead of the 2010–11 season, but missed the start through injury. He went on to make five league starts, but his major contribution came in the League Cup. Facing League One club Brentford, Phillips scored a stoppage-time equaliser and converted his penalty in the shootout by which Birmingham progressed to the quarter-final. They went on to reach the final, where Phillips received his first winners' medal in a cup competition, albeit as an unused substitute, as Birmingham defeated favourites Arsenal 2–1. Birmingham finished 18th in the League, so were relegated to the Championship, and Phillips was one of several players to leave the club when their contracts expired at the end of the season.

=== Blackpool ===
On 10 July 2011, Phillips signed a one-year deal with Football League Championship club Blackpool. On 14 August, he scored both of Blackpool's goals in their 2–1 league victory over Peterborough United, on his home debut. He again scored twice a few days later, including a last-minute equaliser, in a 2–2 draw away at Brighton & Hove Albion. On 5 November, Phillips scored the only goal of the game against Millwall within three minutes of coming on as a substitute. In a five-game spell in January and February 2012, he came off the bench to score late equalising goals in three league matches, two of which Blackpool went on to win, and, in his first start for three months, converted a 93rd-minute penalty against Sheffield Wednesday in the fourth round of the FA Cup to force a replay. Phillips finished the season as the club's top scorer, with 17 goals in all competitions, and won their goal of the season for his equaliser against Cardiff City, described in The Observer as "a lovely lob punishing [goalkeeper] David Marshall for a punched clearance that lacked the required distance. Phillips took the ball down on his chest, picked his spot and scored with consummate skill and accuracy".

Phillips took up the option to extend his Blackpool contract for a further year, but scored only twice from 18 appearances before following manager Ian Holloway to Championship rivals Crystal Palace.

=== Crystal Palace ===
On the last day of the January 2013 transfer window, Phillips signed on loan to Crystal Palace until the end of the 2012–13 season. He made his debut as a half-time substitute in the 2–1 win at home to Charlton Athletic, after being 1–0 down prior to his introduction, and scored his first goal for the Eagles in their next game, against his former club Watford at Vicarage Road. Palace were again trailing when he came off the bench, 2–0 down with half an hour remaining, and Phillips scored the equaliser as the side fought back to achieve a 2–2 draw. Phillips' hat-trick, scored in eight minutes either side of half-time in a 4–2 defeat of Hull City, made him the oldest scorer in Palace's history at 39 years 7 months. This is also the club's fastest ever hat-trick in the league, beating the previous record set by Dougie Freedman in 11 minutes in a 5–0 win against Grimsby Town exactly 17 years before. On 27 May, he came on as a substitute in the play-off final and converted an extra-time penalty, after Wilfried Zaha had been fouled by Marco Cassetti, to secure Palace's promotion to the Premier League at the expense of former club Watford. Steve Parish indicated in the Croydon Advertiser that Phillips had agreed to a one-year deal with Palace in July 2013.

On 20 July, Palace confirmed that Phillips had joined the club on a one-year deal. On 31 December, Palace announced that Phillips would leave the club by mutual consent in January.

=== Leicester City ===
On 15 January 2014, Leicester City confirmed that they had signed Phillips on a short-term contract until the end of the season. The striker made his debut on 18 January against Leeds United, coming on as a substitute for Jamie Vardy, helping create the opportunity that saw fellow former England international David Nugent score the winning goal of the game. On 1 February, Phillips scored his first goal for the club against AFC Bournemouth, heading in winger Anthony Knockaert's cross. Phillips' second goal for Leicester, his first at home, came in the 3–1 victory over former club Blackpool on 15 March. On 28 April, he announced his intention to retire from football at the conclusion of the 2013–14 season. With Leicester already confirmed as champions, Phillips played his final career game in the last match of the season, against Doncaster Rovers on 3 May, and was substituted in the 65th minute.

== Coaching career ==
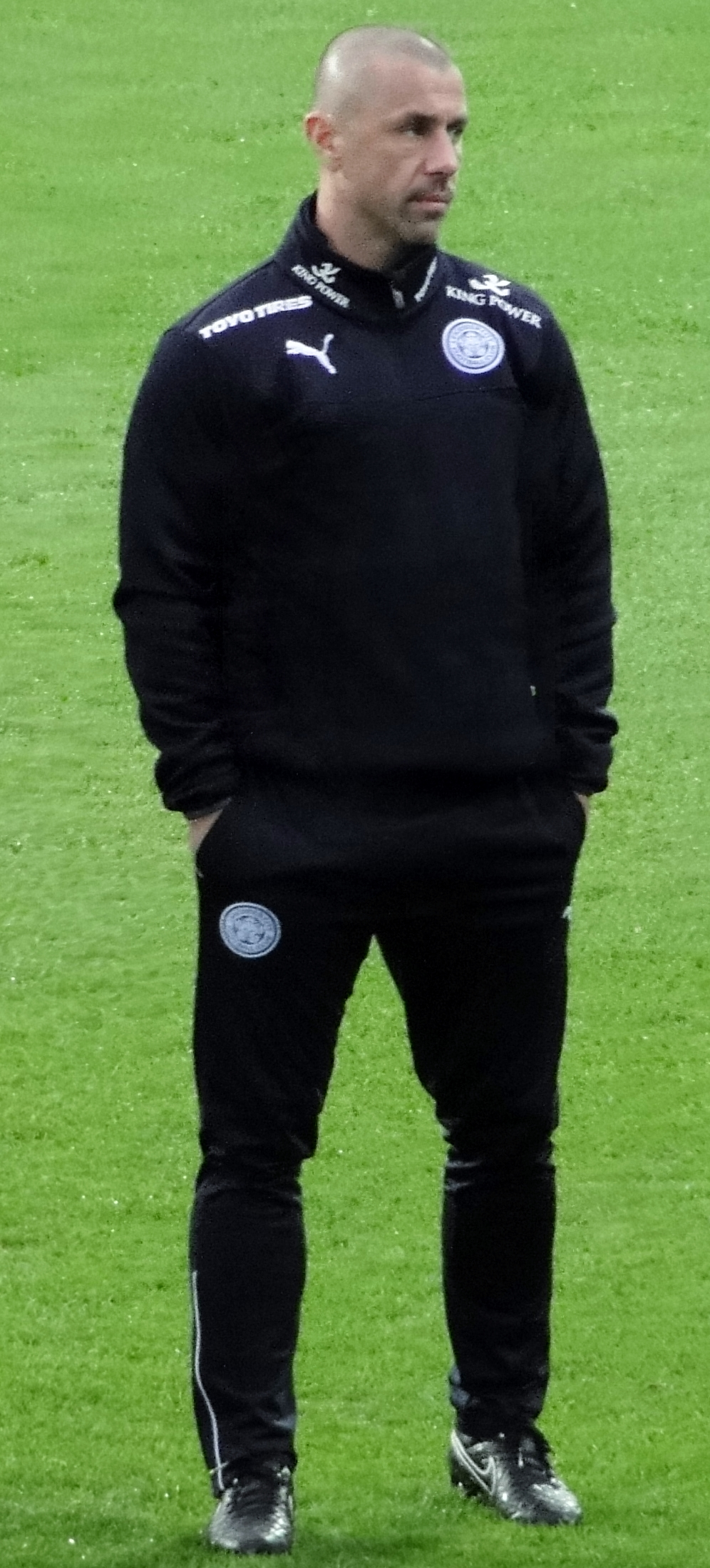
Phillips as a coach of Leicester City in 2014

=== Leicester City ===
Following his retirement from football, Phillips was offered a coaching role and remained at Leicester City as assistant first team coach for the club's first season back in the Premier League.

=== Derby County ===
On 17 September 2015, Phillips was appointed as assistant coach to Paul Clement at Derby County.

=== Stoke City ===
In June 2018, Phillips joined as first-team coach to Gary Rowett at Stoke City. He left Stoke on 8 January 2019.

=== South Shields ===
On 16 January 2022, Phillips was appointed as manager of Northern Premier League Premier Division club South Shields. Despite being favourites to win the league, South Shields finished second and lost in the play-off semi-finals to Warrington Town in Phillips' first season as manager.

Phillips secured promotion in his second season with the club, winning the league title with two games to spare with a 1–0 victory at Whitby Town. He departed the club by mutual consent on 22 April 2023.

=== Hartlepool United ===
On 20 January 2024, Phillips was appointed as head coach of National League club Hartlepool United. Hartlepool had been relegated from League Two in the previous season and were in 16th position, four points above the relegation zone prior to Phillips' appointment. His first match with Hartlepool was a 2–1 home win against York City on 27 January. Hartlepool finished the season in 12th position. On 27 April 2024, Phillips' departure was confirmed after his contract expired. Following his departure from Hartlepool, a statement from Phillips' representatives said that the club had offered him a two-year contract before later withdrawing their offer of a new contract. Phillips himself added that: "I have thoroughly enjoyed working at Hartlepool United and with all the existing staff there". Hartlepool won 7 games from 16 during his tenure.

=== AFC Fylde ===
On 8 October 2024, Phillips was appointed head coach of National League side AFC Fylde. On 19 February 2025, four months after taking charge, Phillips was relieved of his duties.

== International career ==
Between April 1999 and February 2002, Phillips made eight appearances for England but failed to score. His debut came when he was one of five international debutants selected by manager Kevin Keegan for the friendly match away to Hungary. Phillips had an opportunity to score in the first half, but his shot hit Gábor Király's legs. In the 74th minute, Phillips was replaced by fellow debutant Emile Heskey.

In the final warm-up match before the Euro 2000 tournament, Phillips failed to score in a 2–1 victory against Malta, with the BBC describing him as having "that slightly desperate look of all fringe players who have been left precious little time to impress". Despite this, Phillips was selected by Keegan as part of the England squad for Euro 2000, but he remained an unused substitute.

In his final appearance for England, he came on as a half-time substitute in a friendly against the Netherlands on 13 February 2002, in which he had a chance to equalise when he forced keeper Edwin van der Sar into an error; Van der Sar then produced a point-blank save from David Beckham's follow-up.

== Personal life ==
Phillips is married to Julie. They have four children.

Phillips' cousin-in-law is Labour politician Jess Phillips.

== Career statistics ==
=== Club ===
Appearances and goals by club, season and competition
Club	Season	League			FA Cup		League Cup		Other		Total	
Club	Season	Division	Apps	Goals	Apps	Goals	Apps	Goals	Apps	Goals	Apps	Goals
Watford	1994–95	First Division	16	9	0	0	0	0	—		16	9
Watford	1995–96	First Division	27	11	2	0	2	1	—		31	12
Watford	1996–97	Second Division	16	4	0	0	0	0	2 (Note: Appearances in Football League Trophy)	0	18	4
Watford	Total		59	24	2	0	2	1	2	0	65	25
Sunderland	1997–98	First Division	43	29	2	4	0	0	3 (Note: Appearances in Football League play-offs)	2	48	35
Sunderland	1998–99	First Division	26	23	1	0	5	2	—		32	25
Sunderland	1999–2000	Premier League	36	30	2	0	0	0	—		38	30
Sunderland	2000–01	Premier League	34	14	4	2	4	2	—		42	18
Sunderland	2001–02	Premier League	37	11	1	1	1	1	—		39	13
Sunderland	2002–03	Premier League	32	6	4	3	0	0	—		36	9
Sunderland	Total		208	113	14	10	10	5	3	2	235	130
Southampton	2003–04	Premier League	34	12	1	0	0	0	2 (Note: Appearances in UEFA Cup)	1	37	13
Southampton	2004–05	Premier League	30	10	4	2	2	1	—		36	13
Southampton	Total		64	22	5	2	2	1	2	1	73	26
Aston Villa	2005–06	Premier League	23	4	2	0	2	1	—		27	5
West Bromwich Albion	2006–07	Championship	36	16	3	3	1	0	3	3	43	22
West Bromwich Albion	2007–08	Championship	35	22	3	2	0	0	—		38	24
West Bromwich Albion	Total		71	38	6	5	1	0	3	3	81	46
Birmingham City	2008–09	Championship	36	14	0	0	2	0	—		38	14
Birmingham City	2009–10	Premier League	19	4	4	0	1	0	—		24	4
Birmingham City	2010–11	Premier League	14	1	4	2	2	1	—		20	4
Birmingham City	Total		69	19	8	2	5	1	—		82	22
Blackpool	2011–12	Championship	38	16	4	1	0	0	3	0	45	17
Blackpool	2012–13	Championship	18	2	1	0	0	0	—		19	2
Blackpool	Total		56	18	5	1	0	0	3	0	64	19
Crystal Palace (loan)	2012–13	Championship	14	6	—		—		2	1	16	7
Crystal Palace	2013–14	Premier League	4	0	0	0	1	0	—		5	0
Leicester City	2013–14	Championship	12	2	—		—		—		12	2
Career total			580	246	42	20	23	9	15	7	660	282

=== International ===
Appearances and goals by national team and year
National team	Year	Apps	Goals
England B	1998	1	0
England B	Total	1	0
England	1999	2	0
England	2000	4	0
England	2001	1	0
England	2002	1	0
England	Total	8	0

== Managerial statistics ==
As of match played 18 February 2025

Managerial record by team and tenure
Team	From	To	Record					Ref.
Team	From	To	P	W	D	L	Win %	Ref.
South Shields	16 January 2022	22 April 2023	69	40	14	15	58.0	
Hartlepool United	24 January 2024	27 April 2024	16	7	5	4	43.8	
AFC Fylde	8 October 2024	19 February 2025	20	5	3	12	25.0	
Total			105	52	22	31	49.5	—

== Honours ==
=== As a player ===
Sunderland

- Football League First Division: 1998–99

West Bromwich Albion

- Football League Championship: 2007–08

Birmingham City

- Football League Cup: 2010–11
- Football League Championship runner-up: 2008–09

Crystal Palace

- Football League Championship play-offs: 2013

Leicester City

- Football League Championship: 2013–14

Individual

- Football League First Division top scorer: 1997–98
- European Golden Shoe: 1999–2000
- Premier League Golden Boot: 1999–2000
- Premier League Player of the Year: 1999–2000
- PFA Team of the Year: 1999–2000 Premier League, 2007–08 Championship
- North-East FWA Player of the Year: 2000
- Football League Championship Player of the Year: 2007–08
- FourFourTwo 50 Best Football League Players 2008: 1st
- Sir Tom Finney Award: 2015

=== As a manager ===
South Shields

- Northern Premier League: 2022–23
