= David Connolly =

English footballer (born 1977)

Personal information
- Full name: David James Connolly
- Date of birth: 6 June 1977 (age 49)
- Place of birth: Willesden, England
- Height: 5 ft 8 in (1.73 m)
- Position: Striker

Youth career
- –1995: Watford

Senior career*
Years	Team	Apps	(Gls)
1995–1997	Watford	26	(10)
1997–2001	Feyenoord	25	(7)
1998–1999	→ Wolverhampton Wanderers (loan)	32	(6)
1999–2001	→ Excelsior (loan)	48	(42)
2001–2003	Wimbledon	63	(42)
2003–2004	West Ham United	39	(10)
2004–2005	Leicester City	49	(17)
2005–2006	Wigan Athletic	19	(1)
2006–2009	Sunderland	39	(13)
2009–2012	Southampton	61	(14)
2012–2015	Portsmouth	35	(11)
2014	→ Oxford United (loan)	16	(4)
2015	AFC Wimbledon	8	(1)
Total		460	(178)

International career
1996–2005	Republic of Ireland	41	(9)
- * Club domestic league appearances and goals

David James Connolly (born 6 June 1977) is a former professional footballer who played as a striker. He played for various clubs including Feyenoord and Excelsior in the Netherlands as well as Wigan Athletic and Sunderland in the Premier League. Born in England, Connolly represented the Republic of Ireland national team at international level. He was a member of Ireland's 2002 FIFA World Cup squad that lost to Spain in the knockout stage where his penalty kick was saved by Iker Casillas during the shootout.

== Club career ==
Connolly started his career with Watford where he scored 15 goals in 34 games. His goal scoring record, at club and international level, which included a hat-trick in World Cup qualifying, earned him a move to Dutch team Feyenoord Rotterdam. He had loan spells at Excelsior Rotterdam and Wolverhampton Wanderers (where he scored four goals in one game against Bristol City) before joining Wimbledon in 2001 on a free transfer where he scored 42 goals in two seasons.

Manager Glenn Roeder signed Connolly for West Ham United for £285,000 in August 2003. Connolly scored on his West Ham debut in a 2–1 away win at Preston North End on 9 August 2003. He scored 14 goals in 48 games in all competitions for West Ham; his final game coming in the 2004 play-off final defeat to Crystal Palace in May 2004.

Connolly signed for Leicester City in 2004 for £500,000, finishing as the club's top scorer in his first season. He managed a hat-trick against Stoke City in August 2005, prior to signing for Wigan.

On 31 August 2005, he joined newly promoted Premiership club Wigan Athletic for £2 million (with the possibility of rising to £3 million if Wigan stayed in the Premiership, which they did). He scored on his debut for Wigan in a 2–1 win at West Bromwich Albion, but was hit by injuries for much of the rest of the 2005–06 season. and Leeds in the FA Cup.

In 2006, also on 31 August, Connolly linked up with his former Republic of Ireland teammate Roy Keane at Sunderland. His first goal came against Colchester United on 18 November, when he came on as a sub and smashed the ball in off the post from about 18 yards out. Connolly ended up Sunderland's top scorer and was an integral part of their promotion in the 2006–07 season, scoring 13 goals in the campaign and scoring the final goal of the season for Sunderland against Luton Town on 6 May 2007, in the match that made Sunderland champions of the Championship.

In the 2007–08 season, Connolly played just five games, three of them in the league. In the 2008–09 season, Connolly did not make a single appearance. He was released on 28 May 2009.

After being released by Sunderland in the summer of 2009 he became a free agent. On 8 October 2009, Connolly signed a deal with League One side Southampton, lasting until the end of the 2009–10 season but capable of being extended by a further year if he hits an undisclosed number of appearances. He scored on his debut on 17 October 2009 against Oldham Athletic, and grabbed another in the next game against Milton Keynes Dons, once again off the bench. He scored two in the FA Cup first round tie against Bristol Rovers, in a 3–2 victory, his first start. Connolly's contract was then extended for the 2010–11 season.

He struggled with injury in the 2010–11 season, but scored in an FA Cup match against Shrewsbury Town, and then scored a crucial goal in a 2–1 victory away at champions Brighton. He followed that up with a goal in a 3–0 win at Brentford and then on the final day of the season in a 3–1 win over Walsall to end the season with four goals from 18 appearances in an injury-hit season. It was Connolly's late season form that helped Southampton clinch promotion. He also signed a new one-year deal with Saints.

Following Southampton's promotion to the Championship, Connolly continued his goal scoring form into the 2011–12 season by scoring the final goal in Southampton's 3–1 victory over Leeds United in the first game of the season. He then netted the only goal in a 1–0 victory at Barnsley a week later. On 16 August, he scored against Ipswich Town at Portman Road as Saints won 5–2, with the third of the night making the score 3–0 to Southampton at half time. This result firmly planted Southampton on top of the Championship table with three wins from their first three matches. Connolly scored again for Southampton against Leicester City on 27 August, but this was not enough to prevent the Saints from slipping to their first defeat of the season, losing 3–2. However, in January 2012, after the arrivals of Billy Sharp and Tadanari Lee, Connolly lost his place in the starting eleven, and was released at the end of the season.

On 31 December 2012, Connolly signed a one-month contract with Portsmouth. He made his debut a day later, against Swindon Town. He scored his first goal for Pompey on 26 February, against Milton Keynes Dons. He scored his second goal on 2 March, in a 2–1 win against Crewe Alexandra. On 9 March, Connolly scored twice in a 2–0 win against Bury. He left the club by mutual consent on 15 January 2014.

Connolly joined Oxford United on 31 January 2014 – deadline day – until the summer. He scored on his debut against AFC Wimbledon, after coming on as a 46th-minute substitute. His goal against Hartlepool on 21 March 2014 at the age of 36 years, 9 months and 15 days made him the club's oldest scorer to date.

On 15 January 2015 Connolly joined AFC Wimbledon, becoming the sixth player (the others being Jermaine Darlington, Marcus Gayle, Jason Euell, Roger Joseph and Neil Sullivan) to play for both the original Wimbledon and AFC Wimbledon. On 21 February 2015, during one of his final games with AFC Wimbledon, Connolly scored a late winner against local rivals Luton Town to win the game 3–2. On 7 March 2015, Connolly retired from playing.

== International career ==
Connolly was a regular member of the Republic of Ireland national team, scoring nine goals in 41 caps.

He made his debut on 29 May 1996 against Portugal. He was sent off in 1997 after coming on as a substitute against Belgium in the play-off for a place at the 1998 FIFA World Cup, with Ireland losing by an aggregate score of 3–2.

Connolly was part of the 2002 FIFA World Cup squad that lost to Spain in the knockout stage, where his penalty kick was saved by Iker Casillas during the shootout. He scored for Ireland in Niall Quinn's benefit match on 14 May 2002, against his former club, Sunderland as well as once in Mick McCarthy's testimonial on 26 May 1996 against Celtic.

In the 2007–08 season Connolly failed to feature in any of Steve Staunton's squads, despite being Sunderland's top goalscorer, although he was called in to Giovanni Trapattoni's first 40-man squad in 2008 despite being injured at the time.

== Career statistics ==
=== Club ===
Appearances and goals by club, season and competition
Club	Season	League			National cup		League Cup		Europe		Other		Total	
Club	Season	Division	Apps	Goals	Apps	Goals	Apps	Goals	Apps	Goals	Apps	Goals	Apps	Goals
Watford	1994–95	First Division	2	0	2	0	0	0	—		—		4	0
Watford	1995–96	First Division	11	8	1	0	0	0	—		—		12	8
Watford	1996–97	Second Division	13	2	3	4	1	0	—		1 (Note: Appearance(s) in Football League Trophy)	1	18	7
Watford	Total		26	10	6	4	1	0	—		1	1	34	15
Feyenoord	1997–98	Eredivisie	10	2			—		5 (Note: Appearances in UEFA Champions League)	0	—		15	2
Feyenoord	2000–01	Eredivisie	15	5			—		0	0	—		15	5
Feyenoord	Total		25	7			—		5	0	—		30	7
Wolverhampton Wanderers (loan)	1998–99	First Division	32	6	1	0	2	0	—		—		35	6
Excelsior (loan)	1999–00	Eerste Divisie	32	29			—		—		—		32	29
Excelsior (loan)	2000–01	Eerste Divisie	16	13			—		—		—		16	13
Excelsior (loan)	Total		48	42			—		—		—		48	42
Wimbledon	2001–02	First Division	35	18	2	0	1	0	—		—		38	18
Wimbledon	2002–03	First Division	28	24	2	0	0	0	—		—		30	24
Wimbledon	Total		63	42	4	0	1	0	—		—		68	42
West Ham United	2003–04	First Division	39	10	4	2	2	2	—		3 (Note: Appearances in First Division play-offs)	0	48	14
Leicester City	2004–05	Championship	44	13	5	0	0	0	—		—		49	13
Leicester City	2005–06	Championship	5	4	—		0	0	—		—		5	4
Leicester City	Total		49	17	5	0	0	0	—		—		54	17
Wigan Athletic	2005–06	Premier League	17	1	1	1	3	1	—		—		21	3
Wigan Athletic	2006–07	Premier League	2	0	—		—		—		—		2	0
Wigan Athletic	Total		19	1	1	1	3	1	—		—		23	3
Sunderland	2006–07	Championship	36	13	1	0	—		—		—		37	13
Sunderland	2007–08	Premier League	3	0	1	0	1	0	—		—		5	0
Sunderland	2008–09	Premier League	0	0	0	0	0	0	—		—		0	0
Sunderland	Total		39	13	2	0	1	0	—		—		42	13
Southampton	2009–10	League One	20	5	1	2	—		—		2	0	23	7
Southampton	2010–11	League One	15	3	1	1	1	0	—		1	0	18	4
Southampton	2011–12	Championship	26	6	0	0	0	0	—		—		26	6
Southampton	Total		61	14	2	3	1	0	—		3	0	67	17
Portsmouth	2012–13	League One	17	7	—		—		—		—		17	7
Portsmouth	2013–14	League Two	18	4	1	1	0	0	—		1	0	20	5
Portsmouth	2014–15	League Two	0	0	0	0	0	0	—		0	0	0	0
Portsmouth	Total		35	11	1	1	0	0	—		1	0	37	12
Oxford United (loan)	2013–14	League Two	16	4	—		—		—		—		16	4
AFC Wimbledon	2014–15	League Two	8	1	—		—		—		—		8	1
Total			460	178	26	11	11	3	5	0	8	1	510	193

=== International ===
Appearances and goals by national team and year
National team	Year	Apps	Goals
Republic of Ireland	1996	4	2
Republic of Ireland	1997	7	4
Republic of Ireland	1998	3	0
Republic of Ireland	1999	6	1
Republic of Ireland	2000	4	0
Republic of Ireland	2001	6	1
Republic of Ireland	2002	4	0
Republic of Ireland	2003	6	1
Republic of Ireland	2005	1	0
Total		41	9

Scores and results list the Republic of Ireland's goal tally first, score column indicates score after each Connolly goal.

List of international goals scored by David Connolly
No.	Date	Venue	Opponent	Score	Result	Competition
1	9 June 1996	Boston, Massachusetts, U.S.	United States	1–0	1–2	1996 U.S. Cup
2	12 June 1996	New Jersey, U.S.	Mexico		2–2	1996 U.S. Cup
3	21 May 1997	Dublin, Ireland	Liechtenstein		5–0	1998 FIFA World Cup qualification
4	21 May 1997	Dublin, Ireland	Liechtenstein		5–0	1998 FIFA World Cup qualification
5	21 May 1997	Dublin, Ireland	Liechtenstein		5–0	1998 FIFA World Cup qualification
6	6 September 1997	Reykjavík, Iceland	Iceland		4–2	1998 FIFA World Cup qualification
7	10 February 1999	Dublin, Ireland	Paraguay		2–0	Friendly
8	6 October 2001	Dublin, Ireland	Cyprus		4–0	2002 FIFA World Cup qualification
9	9 September 2003	Dublin, Ireland	Turkey		2–2	Friendly

== Honours ==
Sunderland

- Football League Championship: 2006–07

Southampton

- Football League Trophy: 2009–10

== See also ==
- List of Republic of Ireland international footballers born outside the Republic of Ireland
