= Kevin Miller (footballer) =

English footballer (1969–2026)

- Kevin Miller in 2026.

Personal information
- Full name: Kevin Miller
- Date of birth: 15 March 1969
- Place of birth: Falmouth, Cornwall, England
- Date of death: 15 September 2026 (aged 57)
- Height: 6 ft 1 in (1.85 m)
- Position: Goalkeeper

Youth career
- 1985–1986: Falmouth Town
- 1988–1989: Newquay

Senior career*
Years	Team	Apps	(Gls)
1989–1993	Exeter City	163	(0)
1993–1994	Birmingham City	24	(0)
1994–1997	Watford	128	(0)
1997–1999	Crystal Palace	66	(0)
1999–2002	Barnsley	115	(0)
2002–2003	Exeter City	46	(0)
2003–2005	Bristol Rovers	72	(0)
2005	→ Derby County (loan)	0	(0)
2006–2007	Southampton	7	(0)
2007	→ Torquay United (loan)	7	(0)
2007–2016	Bodmin Town		
- * Club domestic league appearances and goals

Kevin Miller (15 March 1969 – 15 September 2026) was an English professional footballer who played as a goalkeeper. He made more than 600 appearances in the Premier League and Football League.

== Career ==
Born in Falmouth, Cornwall, Miller was a product of the Falmouth Town youth scheme playing mostly in midfield before being persuaded to take up goalkeeping in the Combination League team by then manager Keith Rashleigh as a 15 year old. Miller joined Newquay and enjoyed great success including breaking the South Western League goals conceded record under manager Trevor Mewton.

Miller was then signed by Terry Cooper (ex Leeds and England) for Exeter City where he was a key figure in their Fourth Division Championship winning team, before following Cooper to Birmingham City, Crystal Palace, Barnsley, Bristol Rovers and Derby County (on loan), over an eighteen-year period. During this time he also spent three seasons at Watford, earning the Player of the Season award twice.

His move to Premiership side Crystal Palace from Watford in June 1997 saw the most expensive fee of his career being paid: £1.5million. He had been expected to sign for Nottingham Forest but the East Midlands club failed to agree a fee.

He initially retired from football in August 2005, but in February 2006 he was signed by Southampton manager George Burley, whose side was short on goalkeepers, with Bartosz Białkowski out with an injury, Miller was seen as cover for Paul Smith.

Miller displaced Smith in the first team and played the final seven games of Southampton's 2005–06 season, helping the team to five wins and a draw. This form was appreciated and the club offered him a one-year extension on his contract, which he accepted.

In January 2007, he signed a one-month loan deal with League Two strugglers Torquay United, making his debut on 26 January 2007 in the 4–1 win at home to Grimsby Town, United's first win in 20 league games. He returned to Southampton at the end of the loan spell and was released in May 2007.

Returning to non-league football, Miller joined Bodmin Town in October 2007. He retired from playing at the end of the 2014–15 season, aged 46, then decided to do another season at the club.

He was appointed Exeter City's goalkeeping coach on 9 December 2022, to work under new manager Gary Caldwell.

Miller joined Wigan Athletic as a goalkeeping coach in June 2026, once again working under Gary Caldwell.

== Death ==
Miller died unexpectedly overnight on 15 September 2026, aged 57.

== Career statistics ==
Appearances and goals by club, season and competition
Club	Season	League			FA Cup		League Cup		Other		Total	
Club	Season	Division	Apps	Goals	Apps	Goals	Apps	Goals	Apps	Goals	Apps	Goals
Exeter City	1988–89	Fourth Division	3	0	0	0	0	0	0	0	3	0
Exeter City	1989–90	Fourth Division	28	0	4	0	0	0	3 (Note: Appearances in Associate Members' Cup)	0	35	0
Exeter City	1990–91	Third Division	46	0	1	0	2	0	4	0	53	0
Exeter City	1991–92	Third Division	42	0	5	0	1	0	4	0	52	0
Exeter City	1992–93	Second Division	44	0	2	0	4	0	7 (Note: Appearance(s) in Football League Trophy)	0	57	0
Exeter City	Total		163	0	12	0	7	0	18	0	200	0
Birmingham City	1993–94	First Division	24	0	0	0	4	0	2 (Note: Appearances in Anglo-Italian Cup)	0	30	0
Watford	1994–95	First Division	44	0	4	0	3	0	—		51	0
Watford	1995–96	First Division	42	0	2	0	3	0	—		47	0
Watford	1996–97	Second Division	42	0	4	0	4	0	3	0	53	0
Watford	Total		128	0	10	0	10	0	3	0	151	0
Crystal Palace	1997–98	Premier League	38	0	4	0	2	0	—		44	0
Crystal Palace	1998–99	First Division	28	0	1	0	1	0	2 (Note: Appearances in Intertoto Cup)	0	32	0
Crystal Palace	Total		66	0	5	0	3	0	2	0	76	0
Barnsley	1999–2000	First Division	41	0	1	0	4	0	3 (Note: Appearances in First Division play-offs)	0	49	0
Barnsley	2000–01	First Division	46	0	1	0	5	0	—		52	0
Barnsley	2001–02	First Division	28	0	2	0	2	0	—		32	0
Barnsley	Total		115	0	4	0	11	0	3	0	133	0
Exeter City	2002–03	Third Division	46	0	3	0	1	0	2	0	52	0
Bristol Rovers	2003–04	Third Division	44	0	1	0	1	0	1	0	47	0
Bristol Rovers	2004–05	League Two	28	0	2	0	2	0	4	0	36	0
Bristol Rovers	Total		72	0	3	0	3	0	5	0	83	0
Derby County (loan)	2004–05	Championship	0	0	—		—		0	0	0	0
Southampton	2005–06	Championship	7	0	0	0	0	0	—		7	0
Southampton	2006–07	Championship	0	0	0	0	0	0	0	0	0	0
Southampton	Total		7	0	0	0	0	0	0	0	7	0
Torquay United (loan)	2006–07	League Two	7	0	0	0	0	0	—		7	0
Career total			628	0	37	0	39	0	35	0	739	0

== Honours ==
Exeter City

- Football League Fourth Division: 1989–90

Individual

- PFA Team of the Year: 1996–97 Second Division
- Watford Player of the Year: 1995, 1997
- Barnsley Player of the Year: 2000–01
