= Youssef Sofiane =

French–Algerian football player (born 1984)

Personal information
- Full name: Youssef Sofiane
- Date of birth: 8 July 1984 (age 42)
- Place of birth: Villefranche-sur-Saone, France
- Height: 1.80 m (5 ft 11 in)
- Position: Striker

Youth career
- 2000–2002: AJ Auxerre

Senior career*
Years	Team	Apps	(Gls)
2002–2005	West Ham United	1	(0)
2004	→ Lille (loan)	3	(0)
2004	→ Notts County (loan)	4	(0)
2005	→ Roda JC (loan)	3	(0)
2005–2006	Coventry	1	(0)
2006	La Louviere	8	(0)
2006–2007	Sportfreunde Siegen	6	(0)
2007–2008	US Lesquin	5	(0)
2008–2009	Lille B	20	(7)
2009	Lille	1	(0)
2009–2010	R.F.C. Tournai	20	(1)
2010–2011	MC Alger	14	(2)
2012	ES Sétif	4	(0)
- * Club domestic league appearances and goals as of 00:00, 22 April 2011 (UTC)

Youssef Sofiane (Arabic: يوسف سُفيان; born 8 July 1984, in Villefranche-sur-Saône) is a French footballer who played in England, the Netherlands, France, Belgium, Algeria and Germany.

== Club career ==
Of Algerian descent, Sofiane began his footballing career in August 2000 as a trainee at AJ Auxerre. He joined West Ham United in June 2002, when he was signed by manager Glenn Roeder on a free transfer as back-up to the club's strikers. Opportunities were rare however and he made only two appearances for West Ham, as a substitute in a 2–1 away win against Preston, and in a 3–1 win over Rushden in the first round of the League Cup, both in August 2003. He was loaned to Lille in January 2004 until the end of the 2003–04 season, and to Notts County on a one-month loan deal in September 2004, where he made three appearances, scoring one goal against Wrexham in the Football League Trophy. He then joined Dutch club Roda JC on loan through January–May 2005, where he made three substitute appearances. Despite playing in pre-season games, he was not given a squad number by West Ham for the 2005–06 season and his contract was terminated by mutual consent in August 2005. After trials with MK Dons and Coventry City, he joined Coventry on non-contract terms in October 2005. However, he made only one substitute appearance for Coventry before being released in January 2006.

After leaving Coventry, he played for La Louviere in the Belgian Jupiler League, Sportfreunde Siegen of the German Regionalliga, and US Lesquin in France.

On 7 December 2011, Sofiane signed an 18-month contract with ES Sétif. He signed as a free agent having been without a club after his contract with MC Alger ended in summer 2011.

Sofiane later became a football agent.

== Representative honours ==
Sofiane represented France at Under-15 to Under-18 level.

== Honours ==
ES Sétif

- Algerian Cup: 2012
