= Tommy Mooney =

English footballer

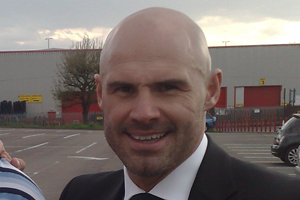

Personal information
- Full name: Thomas John Mooney
- Date of birth: 11 August 1971 (age 55)
- Place of birth: Billingham, England
- Height: 5 ft 11 in (1.80 m)
- Position: Striker

Youth career
- 1988–1990: Aston Villa

Senior career*
Years	Team	Apps	(Gls)
1990–1993	Scarborough	107	(30)
1993–1994	Southend United	14	(5)
1994	→ Watford (loan)	10	(2)
1994–2001	Watford	240	(58)
2001–2003	Birmingham City	34	(13)
2002	→ Stoke City (loan)	12	(3)
2003	→ Sheffield United (loan)	3	(0)
2003	→ Derby County (loan)	8	(0)
2003–2004	Swindon Town	45	(19)
2004–2005	Oxford United	42	(15)
2005–2007	Wycombe Wanderers	87	(29)
2007–2008	Walsall	36	(11)
2008–2009	UD Marbella	10	(0)
Total		642	(185)
- * Club domestic league appearances and goals

Thomas John Mooney (born 11 August 1971) is an English former professional footballer who played mainly as a striker. He made more than 600 appearances in the Football League and Premier League – with 250 for Watford and more than 100 for Scarborough – and scored in each of the top four divisions of the English football league system.

== Playing career ==
=== Early career ===
Mooney initially began his career at Aston Villa, appearing for the youth and reserve sides over two years, but was released in 1990 by Graham Taylor without ever playing for the first team. Mooney then joined Scarborough, where he made a name for himself, scoring 40 goals in 129 first-team appearances. After three years at Scarborough, he moved to Southend United for a reported £100,000.

=== Watford ===
After just one season at Southend he arrived at Watford – initially on loan, before eventually signing for £95,000 in July 1994 as a 'makeweight' alongside midfielder Derek Payne, with Keith Dublin moving in the opposite direction.

In his early days at the club, under manager Glenn Roeder, he failed to cement a successful striking partnership with Jamie Moralee and soon found himself in the reserves or on the bench. He eventually ended up playing as part of the defensive line during the Second Division championship-winning campaign of 1997–98.

Mooney started the 1998–99 season in a defensive role, but slipped out of the side as Watford reverted to 4–4–2. Meanwhile, Watford, after a good start, had fallen out of the play-off positions as the season drew to a close. On 3 April 1999 during a home league match against Tranmere Rovers Watford manager Graham Taylor brought on Mooney as part of a triple substitution. The effect was almost immediate with Mooney whipping in a cross for Peter Kennedy to half volley home, as Watford went on to win 2–1.

Taylor picked Mooney for the following week's away fixture against Birmingham City in his favoured striker's role. He scored the first and made the second in a 2–0 win. Watford went on to reach the play-offs gaining 19 points (out of a maximum 21) from their last seven games with Mooney scoring in every game bar one. He went on to give valuable performances in both legs of the subsequent play-off semi final (against Birmingham) and the final against Bolton Wanderers at Wembley Stadium, despite not scoring in either.

Watford's inaugural Premiership season started brightly enough for Mooney, who scored the only goal in front of The Kop at Anfield to secure a memorable away win against Liverpool – his boyhood club. He scored again the following week at home to Bradford City. He was injured in a 1–0 win against Gianluca Vialli's Chelsea in mid-September. He was only able to make eight appearances as Watford were relegated.

A return to the First Division in 2000 witnessed a fully fit Mooney back as centre forward. He became the first player in nearly a decade to score twenty league goals for the club. This achievement was enough to earn Mooney his second Player of the Season award.

In May 2006 Mooney became the fourth inductee into the Watford Hall of Fame, alongside Luther Blissett, John McClelland and Tony Coton.

=== Birmingham and beyond ===
Out of contract with Watford, Mooney took up the offer of a better contract to play for Birmingham City, playing for the West Midlands club from June 2001 to July 2003 and making a total of 29 league starts. He featured heavily in the side that took Birmingham from the First Division to the FA Premier League via the playoffs in the 2001–2002 season. However Mooney played just one game in the top division before being loaned to Stoke City. At Stoke Mooney played 12 times scoring three goals one of which came against his former club Watford. Two other loans followed that season for Sheffield United and Derby County. At Sheffield United he scored once in the FA Cup, against future club Walsall.

Mooney then moved to Swindon Town for the 2003–2004 season. Mooney played a crucial part in Swindon reaching the play-offs that season, scoring 20 goals and setting up many more. Swindon lost in the play-off semi-final to Brighton & Hove Albion, with Mooney missing his kick in the penalty shootout when keeper Ben Roberts just tipped it around the post. Then in the summer of 2004, he transferred to Swindon's rivals Oxford United, having failed to agree a new contract with Swindon. He was Oxford's top scorer for the club in 2004–2005.

In the summer of 2005 Mooney signed for Wycombe Wanderers, on a two-year contract. His first season at Wycombe started superbly, scoring a volley against Carlisle United on his debut but ended in misery as he limped out of Wycombe's play-off semi final against Cheltenham, which Wycombe went on to lose. He was also captain of the side. Mooney also played in the biggest game of the latter part of his career when he played for Wycombe in the League Cup semi-final against Chelsea (both legs) including making the flick header to Jermaine Easter which resulted in a 1–1 draw in the first leg at Adams Park. Wycombe went on to lose the second leg 4–0 at Stamford Bridge

In July 2007 Mooney rejected a contract with Wycombe saying that they had not made enough changes to have a good chance of promotion the following season. He subsequently signed for newly promoted League One side Walsall.

Mooney's contract expired at the end of the 2007–08 season, and the player rejected the chance of an extension with the club. It was announced in June 2008 that Mooney had joined Segunda División B side UD Marbella. who were to be his last club before retirement.

== Coaching career ==
As of August 2018, Mooney was working as a coach at Aston Villa.

== Personal life ==
His son Kelsey is also a footballer.

== Media ==
Mooney currently has various media roles with Watford, and is a matchday commentator alongside Jon Marks for the club's live match streaming platform 'Hornets Hive Live'. He also regularly appears on the Watford FC Official Club Podcast.

== Career statistics ==
Appearances and goals by club, season and competition
Club	Season	League			FA Cup		League Cup		Other^{[A]}		Total	
Club	Season	Division	Apps	Goals	Apps	Goals	Apps	Goals	Apps	Goals	Apps	Goals
Scarborough	1990–91	Fourth Division	27	13	1	0	2	0	1	0	31	13
Scarborough	1991–92	Fourth Division	40	8	1	0	4	3	3	0	48	11
Scarborough	1992–93	Third Division	40	9	1	0	7	5	2	2	50	16
Scarborough	Total		107	30	3	0	13	8	6	2	129	40
Southend United	1993–94	First Division	14	5	0	0	2	0	5	0	21	5
Southend United	Total		14	5	0	0	2	0	5	0	21	5
Watford	1993–94	First Division	10	2	0	0	0	0	0	0	10	2
Watford	1994–95	First Division	29	3	2	0	4	1	0	0	35	4
Watford	1995–96	First Division	42	6	1	1	3	0	0	0	46	7
Watford	1996–97	Second Division	37	13	3	0	4	0	1	0	45	13
Watford	1997–98	Second Division	45	6	5	0	4	0	0	0	54	6
Watford	1998–99	First Division	36	9	0	0	1	0	3	0	40	9
Watford	1999–2000	Premier League	12	2	0	0	1	0	0	0	13	2
Watford	2000–01	First Division	39	19	1	1	5	2	0	0	45	22
Watford	Total		250	60	12	2	22	3	4	0	288	65
Birmingham City	2001–02	First Division	33	13	1	0	1	2	3	0	38	15
Birmingham City	2002–03	Premier League	1	0	0	0	0	0	0	0	1	0
Birmingham City	Total		34	13	1	0	1	2	3	0	39	15
Stoke City (loan)	2002–03	First Division	12	3	0	0	0	0	0	0	12	3
Sheffield United (loan)	2002–03	First Division	3	0	2	1	1	0	0	0	6	1
Derby County (loan)	2002–03	First Division	8	0	0	0	0	0	0	0	8	0
Swindon Town	2003–04	Second Division	45	19	1	0	1	1	2	0	49	20
Oxford United	2004–05	League Two	42	15	1	0	1	0	1	0	45	15
Wycombe Wanderers	2005–06	League Two	45	17	1	0	2	1	3	1	51	19
Wycombe Wanderers	2006–07	League Two	42	12	2	0	5	1	0	0	49	13
Walsall	2007–08	League One	36	11	3	1	1	0	0	0	40	12
UD Marbella	2008–09	Segunda División B	10	0	0	0	0	0	0	0	10	0
Career total			642	185	26	4	49	16	24	3	741	208

A. The "Other" column constitutes appearances and goals in the Anglo-Italian Cup, Football League Trophy and Football League play-offs.

== Honours ==
Watford

- Football League First Division play-offs: 1999
- Football League Second Division: 1997–98

Birmingham City

- Football League First Division play-offs: 2002
