= Colin Foster =

English footballer

Personal information
- Full name: Colin John Foster
- Date of birth: 16 July 1964 (age 62)
- Place of birth: Chislehurst, Kent, England
- Height: 1.93 m (6 ft 4 in)
- Position: Central defender

Youth career
- Elmstead

Senior career*
Years	Team	Apps	(Gls)
1982–1987	Leyton Orient	178	(10)
1987–1989	Nottingham Forest	72	(5)
1989–1994	West Ham United	93	(4)
1994	→ Notts County (loan)	9	(0)
1994–1997	Watford	66	(8)
1997	→ Cambridge United (loan)	7	(0)
1997–1998	Cambridge United	27	(1)
Total		425	(55)
- * Club domestic league appearances and goals

Colin Foster (born 16 July 1964) is an English former professional footballer who played as a central defender.

== Career ==
Starting out at non-League club Elmstead, Foster made his league debut for Leyton Orient in January 1982 whilst still an apprentice. He moved to Nottingham Forest, for a fee of £50,000 in May 1987, making 72 league appearances under manager, Brian Clough.

In September 1989, Foster became manager Lou Macari's second and most expensive signing for West Ham United for £750,000. Never a regular player under Macari, he became so under new manager Billy Bonds in a team which won promotion from the second division in season 1990–91. Foster's time at West Ham is most often associated with scoring a spectacular mid-air volley in an FA Cup Quarter-final versus Everton in March 1991. Everton were in the upper reaches of the First Division (then the top tier) while West Ham were a second-tier side. West Ham won the match 2–1 before being knocked out in the semi-finals by Foster's old club Nottingham Forest. Three seasons broken by regular injury followed and after a projected £400,000 move back to Nottingham Forest fell through, when Foster could not agree terms, he remained at West Ham on a weekly contract. A loan to Notts County followed before he eventually moved, for a fee of £100,000, to Watford in March 1994.
