= Jamie Moralee =

English footballer

Personal information
- Date of birth: 2 December 1971 (age 54)
- Place of birth: London, England
- Height: 5 ft 10 in (1.78 m)
- Positions: Midfielder; forward

Youth career
- Crystal Palace

Senior career*
Years	Team	Apps	(Gls)
1989–1992	Crystal Palace	6	(0)
1992–1994	Millwall	76	(20)
1994–1996	Watford	69	(7)
1996–1998	Crewe Alexandra	20	(0)
1998	Royal Antwerp	5	(2)
1998–1999	Brighton & Hove Albion	35	(4)
1999–2000	Colchester United	29	(2)
2000–2003	Barry Town	96	(59)
2003–2004	Forest Green Rovers	12	(2)
2004–2005	Newport County	44	(12)
2005–2006	Chelmsford City		
- * Club domestic league appearances and goals

Jamie Moralee (born 2 December 1971) is an English former footballer who played as a midfielder or forward.

== Playing career ==
Moralee started his career at Crystal Palace but found his opportunities limited. He made only six appearances for the club, without scoring. He joined Millwall on a free transfer in September 1992. Moralee scored 20 goals in 76 appearances for Millwall in two seasons as they nearly gained promotion from Division One to the Premier League under Mick McCarthy.

Moralee joined Watford for £450,000 in the summer of 1994. Signed as a replacement for 1993–94 player of the season Paul Furlong, who had left for Chelsea, Moralee proved to be a disappointment, scoring seven times in 69 appearances over two seasons. Watford were relegated to Division Two at the end of the 1995–96 season and Moralee was given a free transfer.

Moralee joined Crewe Alexandra in August 1996, making his debut at Gresty Road in a 1–0 win over Stockport County, but played only 20 times in two seasons without scoring. He spent the 1998–99 season with Brighton & Hove Albion, whom he joined on a free transfer, scoring four times in 35 appearances. After being released once more, he played his final Football League season with Colchester United, for whom he scored twice in 29 appearances.

After leaving Colchester, Moralee signed for full-time League of Wales side Barry Town, managed by former Crystal Palace colleague Peter Nicholas. He played for the side for three years, each time winning the title. His goal in a 2–0 win over T.N.S. secured the title in 2001. As a consequence, Moralee also played in Champions League qualifiers. He left the club in 2003 when they suffered financial breakdown and a player exodus.

Moralee had an unhappy 2003–04 season with Conference side Forest Green Rovers, scoring twice in 12 appearances, before rejoining Nicholas at Newport County in 2004, initially on loan. He had a difficult relationship with the fans of the club, but did score the winning goal in a 2–1 victory against Maidenhead that was vital to the club's Conference South survival After leaving the Welsh club to live closer to his London home, he played the 2005–06 season for Chelmsford City. He also represented a Watford side in Sky's Masters Football.

== Post-playing career ==
Moralee is listed on the website of New Era Global Sports Management as the company's managing director. Moralee is also the agent of ex-Manchester United defender Rio Ferdinand and was widely quoted in the press expressing dismay at Roy Hodgson's decision to omit his client from the UEFA Euro 2012 England squad.

His business interests include co-ownership of the company New Era Overseas, which looks to help footballers with financial investment.

== Personal life ==
He is married to Lisa, with a son, Frankie, born in 2005. He attended Ingram High School close to Selhurst Park, the home of Crystal Palace F.C.
