= Dominic Ludden =

English footballer

Personal information
- Date of birth: 30 March 1974 (age 52)
- Place of birth: Basildon, England
- Position: Defender

Senior career*
Years	Team	Apps	(Gls)
–1992	Billericay Town	1	(0)
1992–1994	Leyton Orient	58	(1)
1994–1998	Watford	33	(0)
1998–2001	Preston North End	37	(0)
2001–2002	Halifax Town	2	(0)
2002–2003	Leigh RMI	5	(0)
- * Club domestic league appearances and goals

Dominic Ludden (born 30 March 1974) is an English former footballer. He played as a defender for several English clubs, including Billericay Town, where he began his career, Leyton Orient, Watford, Preston North End, before finishing his career with spells at Halifax Town and Leigh RMI. Ludden scored within ten minutes of his debut for Leyton Orient vs Huddersfield. He played under David Moyes at Preston and was England Under 18 captain in 1992.
