= Craig Ramage =

English footballer

Personal information
- Date of birth: 30 March 1970 (age 56)
- Place of birth: Alvaston, Derby, England
- Position: Midfielder

Youth career
- 1986–1988: Derby County

Senior career*
Years	Team	Apps	(Gls)
1988–1994	Derby County	42	(4)
1989	→ Wigan Athletic (loan)	10	(2)
1994–1997	Watford	104	(27)
1997	→ Peterborough United (loan)	8	(0)
1997–1999	Bradford City	35	(1)
1999–2001	Notts County	55	(7)
Total		222	(41)

International career
1990–1992	England U21	3	(0)
- * Club domestic league appearances and goals

Craig Ramage (born 30 March 1970) is a former footballer who played in midfield for six clubs.

== Playing career ==
Born in Derby, Ramage started his career in his hometown as a trainee with Derby County. He played 42 games scoring four goals at Derby, during which time he also spent a short period on loan at Wigan Athletic.

In 1994, he made a £90,000 move to Watford. Ramage was a big hit at Vicarage Road and he finished just one game short of 100 starts. He was also a prolific scorer, and he netted 27 times in his 104 appearances. He spent a month on loan at Peterborough United in 1997 before he moved at the end of the season to Bradford City.

Ramage's time at City was a tough one. He was suspended for the start of the season and it was not until the seventh game against Middlesbrough he made his full debut. He made a total of 32 appearances but scored just once in the final game of the season as City lost 3–1 to Portsmouth.

Ramage was limited to just three substitute appearances in 1998–99 as Bradford earned promotion to the Premier League. It was little surprise that Ramage left during the summer to join Notts County where he started 50 games in three seasons.

== Radio career ==
He worked as a commentator for BBC Radio Derby on Derby County matches, but was dropped by the BBC after he said in February 2020 that the "young black lads" in the Derby team (Max Lowe and Jayden Bogle) should "go back to basics, working hard".
