= 2009–10 Crystal Palace F.C. season =

English football club season

Crystal Palace
2009–10 season
- Chairman: Simon Jordan
- Manager: Neil Warnock (until 2 March); Paul Hart (caretaker, from 2 March until end of the season)
- Stadium: Selhurst Park
- Championship: 21st
- FA Cup: Fifth round
- League Cup: Second round
- Top goalscorer: League: Darren Ambrose (15); All: Darren Ambrose (20)
- Highest home attendance: 20,643 v Newcastle United, 22 August 2009
- Lowest home attendance: 12,283 v Swansea City, 9 February 2010
- Average home league attendance: 14,770
Home colours	Away colours

The Crystal Palace F.C. season 2009–10 was Crystal Palace's 5th consecutive season in the Championship, after a 15th-placed finish in the previous campaign. The season started well before taking a turn for the worse when the club was placed into administration at the end of January 2010, culminating in manager Neil Warnock leaving his job just over a month later and being replaced by Paul Hart, whose tenure saw the club survive relegation on the final day of the season.

== Statistics ==
Last updated on 2 May 2010.

No.	Pos	Nat	Player	Total		Championship		FA Cup		League Cup	
No.	Pos	Nat	Player	Apps	Goals	Apps	Goals	Apps	Goals	Apps	Goals
1	GK	(Argentina) ARG	Julián Speroni	52	-62	45	-50	5	-9	2	-3
2	DF	(England) ENG	Nathaniel Clyne	28	1	19+3	1	5	0	1	0
3	DF	(England) ENG	Clint Hill	48	1	43	1	3	0	2	0
4	MF	(England) ENG	Shaun Derry	53	0	46	0	5	0	2	0
5	DF	(Republic of Ireland) IRL	Paddy McCarthy	22	0	20	0	0	0	2	0
6	DF	(Portugal) POR	José Fonte	25	1	22	1	1	0	2	0
7	MF	(England) ENG	Darren Ambrose	53	20	44+2	15	5	3	2	2
8	MF	(England) ENG	Neil Danns	49	9	41+1	8	5	1	2	0
9	FW	(Trinidad and Tobago) TTO	Stern John	16	2	7+9	2	0	0	0	0
10	MF	(Australia) AUS	Nick Carle	26	1	14+8	1	3	0	0+1	0
11	FW	(England) ENG	Victor Moses (Note: Moses was born in Lagos, Nigeria, but obtained asylum in England at the age of 11, and represented them at youth level before making his international debut for Nigeria in 2012.)	21	6	14+4	6	1	0	2	0
12	GK	(England) ENG	Darryl Flahavan	1	-2	1	-2	0	0	0	0
14	FW	(Republic of Ireland) IRL	Sean Scannell (Note: Scannell was born in Croydon, England, but also qualified to represent the Republic of Ireland and Northern Ireland internationally through his father, as well as Jamaica, and has represented the Republic of Ireland at youth and B level.)	29	2	11+15	2	1	0	0+2	0
15	DF	(England) ENG	Lee Hills	19	0	10+9	0	0	0	0	0
16	FW	(England) ENG	Freddie Sears	19	0	11+7	0	0	0	1	0
17	DF	(England) ENG	Matthew Lawrence	21	0	14+4	0	2+1	0	0	0
18	FW	(England) ENG	Calvin Andrew	32	2	13+14	1	0+5	1	0	0
19	FW	(Republic of Ireland) IRL	Alan Lee	47	8	33+9	7	4	1	1	0
20	DF	(England) ENG	Danny Butterfield	42	3	36+1	0	4	3	1	0
21	MF	(England) ENG	Kieran Djilali	11	1	2+6	1	0+2	0	0+1	0
22	DF	(Austria) AUT	Johannes Ertl	36	1	29+4	0	2	1	0+1	0
24	DF	(Jamaica) JAM	Claude Davis	26	0	19+2	0	5	0	0	0
28	MF	(England) ENG	James Comley	2	0	0	0	0+2	0	0	0
29	MF	(England) ENG	Ryan Smith	6	0	0+5	0	0	0	0+1	0
33	MF	(France) FRA	Alassane N'Diaye	29	3	12+14	3	1	0	2	0
34	MF	(England) ENG	Alex Wynter	1	0	0	0	0+1	0	0	0
36	FW	(England) ENG	Wilfried Zaha	1	0	0+1	0	0	0	0	0

== Club ==
=== Management ===
Position	Staff
Manager	(England) Neil Warnock (July–March)/ (England) Paul Hart (March–May)/ (Scotland)
Assistant manager	(England) Mick Jones (July–March)/ (Scotland) Dougie Freedman (March–)
First team coach	(England) Keith Curle (July–March)/ (England) John Pemberton (March–May)
Goalkeeping coach	(England) Jim Stannard
Chief scout	(England) Kevin Randall (July–March)
Fitness coach	(England) Chris Short
Reserve team manager	(England) Ronnie Jepson
Academy manager	(England) David Moss
U18 team/Assistant academy manager	(England) Gary Issott
U13 team	(England) John Salako
Academy coach	(England) Mark Bright
Physiotherapists	(England) Nigel Cox; Sangi Patel and Stuart Wardle

== League table ==
Pos	Team	Pld	W	D	L	GF	GA	GD	Pts	Promotion, qualification or relegation
19	Coventry City	46	13	15	18	47	64	−17	54	
20	Scunthorpe United	46	14	10	22	62	84	−22	52	
21	Crystal Palace	46	14	17	15	50	53	−3	49 (Note: Crystal Palace were given a ten-point deduction for entering administration.)	
22	Sheffield Wednesday (R)	46	11	14	21	49	69	−20	47	Relegation to Football League One
23	Plymouth Argyle (R)	46	11	8	27	43	68	−25	41	Relegation to Football League One

Source: The Football League
Rules for classification: 1) points; 2) goal difference; 3) number of goals scored.
(R) Relegated

== Matches ==
=== Preseason ===
9 July 2009	Boreham Wood	0–4	Crystal Palace	Borehamwood
19:30		(Report)	Marić 28'; Ertl 32'; Djilali 45'; Thomas 60'	Stadium: Meadow Park

13 July 2009	Crystal Palace Baltimore	2–5	Crystal Palace	Waldorf, Maryland
20:00 (local time)	Teixeira 15'; Seabrook 55'	(Report)	Lee 11'; Flores 42', 90' (o.g.); Sears 48'; N'Diaye 71'	Stadium: Regency Furniture Stadium; Attendance: 2,136

16 July 2009	Harrisburg City Islanders	1–3	Crystal Palace	Lancaster, Pennsylvania
19:00 (local time)	Swartzendruber 69'	(Report)	Sears 33'; Ambrose 38'; Danns 45'	Stadium: Clipper Magazine Stadium; Attendance: 5,099

21 July 2009	Brentford	2–2	Crystal Palace	London
19:45	Derry 29' (o.g.); Weston 56'	(Report)	Ambrose 22'; Fonte 77'	Stadium: Griffin Park

24 July 2009	Bristol Rovers	0–3	Crystal Palace	Bristol
19:45		(Report)	Sears 29'; Danns 84' (pen.); N'Diaye 89'	Stadium: Memorial Stadium; Attendance: 2,174

25 July 2009	Sutton United	0–2	Crystal Palace XI	Sutton
15:00		[ (Report)]	M. Wright 3'; Pinney 85'	Stadium: Gander Green Lane

25 July 2009	Northwood	1–0	Crystal Palace XI	London
15:00	Matthews 75'	[ (Report)]		Stadium: Northwood Park

27 July 2009	Croydon Athletic	1–1	Crystal Palace XI	London
19:30	Noel 62'	[ (Report)]	Roberts 11'	Stadium: Keith Tuckey Stadium

28 July 2009	Crystal Palace	0–1	Norwich City	London
19:30		(Report)	Whaley 63'	Stadium: Selhurst Park; Attendance: 2,216; Referee: David Phillips

29 July 2009	East Grinstead Town	0–6	Crystal Palace XI	East Grinstead
19:30		[ (Report)]	Pinney 18'; Scannell 62'; N'Diaye 64'; Cadogan 69', 84'; Thomas 88'	Stadium: GAC Stadium

30 July 2009	Bromley	0–1	Crystal Palace	London
19:45		(Report)	N'Diaye 70'	Stadium: Hayes Lane; Referee: Phil Crossley

2 August 2009	Crystal Palace	0–1	Gillingham	London
14:00		(Report)	Payne 62'	Stadium: Selhurst Park; Attendance: 1,980; Referee: Grant Hegley

5 August 2009	Whyteleafe	0–2	Crystal Palace XI	Whyteleafe
19:30		[ (Report)]	Thomas 30'; Wright	Stadium: Church Road

=== Football League Championship ===
8 August 2009 1	Crystal Palace	1–1	Plymouth Argyle	London
15:00	Lee 63'	(Report)	Timár 5'	Stadium: Selhurst Park; Attendance: 14,358; Referee: Andy Penn

15 August 2009 2	Bristol City	1–0	Crystal Palace	Bristol
15:00	Maynard 89'	(Report)		Stadium: Ashton Gate; Attendance: 14,603; Referee: Rob Shoebridge

18 August 2009 3	Ipswich Town	1–3	Crystal Palace	Ipswich
19:45	Bruce 62'	(Report)	Ambrose 49', 50'; Danns 69'	Stadium: Portman Road; Attendance: 20,348; Referee: Keith Hill

22 August 2009 4	Crystal Palace	0–2	Newcastle United	London
15:00		(Report)	Nolan 2'; Taylor 21'	Stadium: Selhurst Park; Attendance: 20,643; Referee: Andy D'Urso

31 August 2009 5	Peterborough United	1–1	Crystal Palace	Peterborough
17:15	Batt 53'	(Report)	Lee 64'; McCarthy (yellow card) 74' (red card)	Stadium: London Road; Attendance: 8,473; Referee: Kevin Friend

12 September 2009 6	Crystal Palace	0–4	Scunthorpe United	London
15:00		(Report)	Forte 4'; Hayes 58'; Togwell 66'; O'Connor 68'	Stadium: Selhurst Park; Attendance: 12,912; Referee: Grant Hegley

19 September 2009 7	Crystal Palace	1–0	Derby County	London
15:00	Ambrose 55'	(Report)		Stadium: Selhurst Park; Attendance: 12,760; Referee: Michael Oliver

26 September 2009 8	West Bromwich Albion	0–1	Crystal Palace	West Bromwich
15:00		(Report)	N'Diaye 63'	Stadium: The Hawthorns; Attendance: 21,007; Referee: Russell Booth

29 September 2009 9	Crystal Palace	0–0	Sheffield Wednesday	London
20:00		(Report)		Stadium: Selhurst Park; Attendance: 12,476; Referee: Trevor Kettle

3 October 2009 10	Crystal Palace	4–1	Blackpool	London
15:00	Lee 4'; Danns 32'; Ambrose 66'; N'Diaye 89'	(Report)	Baptiste 53'	Stadium: Selhurst Park; Attendance: 15,749; Referee: Anthony Taylor

17 October 2009 11	Cardiff City	1–1	Crystal Palace	Cardiff
15:00	Whittingham 19'	(Report)	Hudson 13' (o.g.)	Stadium: Cardiff City Stadium; Attendance: 21,457; Referee: Steve Tanner

20 October 2009 12	Leicester City	2–0	Crystal Palace	Leicester
19:45	Gallagher 59', 81'	(Report)		Stadium: Walkers Stadium; Attendance: 22,220; Referee: Roger East

24 October 2009 13	Crystal Palace	1–1	Nottingham Forest	London
15:00	Ambrose 40'	(Report)	McGoldrick 48'	Stadium: Selhurst Park; Attendance: 15,692; Referee: Graham Horwood

31 October 2009 14	Preston North End	1–1	Crystal Palace	Preston
15:00	Wallace 35'	(Report)	Ambrose 37'	Stadium: Deepdale; Attendance: 12,558; Referee: David Foster

3 November 2009 15	Queens Park Rangers	1–1	Crystal Palace	London
20:00	Buzsáky 19' (pen.)	(Report)	Ambrose 62' (pen.)	Stadium: Loftus Road; Attendance: 14,377; Referee: Mick Russell

7 November 2009 16	Crystal Palace	1–0	Middlesbrough	London
15:00	Ambrose 65'	(Report)		Stadium: Selhurst Park; Attendance: 15,321; Referee: James Linington

21 November 2009 17	Coventry City	1–1	Crystal Palace	Coventry
15:00	Best 47'	(Report)	Ambrose 28'	Stadium: Ricoh Arena; Attendance: 18,400; Referee: Jarnail Singh

28 November 2009 18	Crystal Palace	3–0	Watford	London
15:00	Moses 2'; Lee 6'; Ambrose 54'	(Report)		Stadium: Selhurst Park; Attendance: 14,085; Referee: Oliver Langford

5 December 2009 19	Crystal Palace	0–3	Doncaster Rovers	London
15:00		(Report)	Sharp 41'; Woods 61'; Hayter 82'	Stadium: Selhurst Park; Attendance: 13,985; Referee: Paul Miller

8 December 2009 20	Reading	2–4	Crystal Palace	Reading
19:45	Pearce 31'; Sigurðsson 80' (pen.)	(Report)	Clyne 7'; Ambrose 45+1'; Moses 45+2', 88'	Stadium: Madejski Stadium; Attendance: 16,629; Referee: Kevin Friend

12 December 2009 21	Sheffield United	2–0	Crystal Palace	Sheffield
15:00	Williamson 21'; Quinn 90+1'	(Report)		Stadium: Bramall Lane; Attendance: 25,510; Referee: Colin Webster

19 December 2009 22	Crystal Palace	1–1	Barnsley	London
15:00	Moses 51'	(Report)	Bogdanovic 19'	Stadium: Selhurst Park; Attendance: 14,279; Referee: Keith Hill

26 December 2009 23	Crystal Palace	3–1	Ipswich Town	London
13:00	Fonte 38'; Danns 58'; Moses 90+4'	(Report)	Peters 19'; Stead (red card) 39'	Stadium: Selhurst Park; Attendance: 16,496; Referee: Paul Taylor

28 December 2009 24	Swansea City	0–0	Crystal Palace	Swansea
15:00	Serrán (red card) 17'	(Report)		Stadium: Liberty Stadium; Attendance: 18,794; Referee: Anthony Taylor

16 January 2010 25	Plymouth Argyle	0–1	Crystal Palace	Plymouth
15:00		(Report)	Moses 17'	Stadium: Home Park; Attendance: 9,318; Referee: Anthony Bates

27 January 2010 26	Newcastle United	2–0	Crystal Palace	Newcastle upon Tyne
19:45	Derry 20' (o.g.); Ranger 90+4'	(Report)		Stadium: St James' Park; Attendance: 37,886; Referee: Russell Booth

30 January 2010 27	Crystal Palace	2–0	Peterborough United	London
15:00	Danns 28', 65'	(Report)		Stadium: Selhurst Park; Attendance: 14,699; Referee: Graham Salisbury

6 February 2010 28	Scunthorpe United	1–2	Crystal Palace	Scunthorpe
15:00	Williams (red card) 72'; Mirfin 84'	(Report)	Ambrose 63'; Danns 90+3'	Stadium: Glanford Park; Attendance: 5,695; Referee: Paul Tierney

9 February 2010 29	Crystal Palace	0–1	Swansea City	London
20:00		(Report)	Kuqi 14'	Stadium: Selhurst Park; Attendance: 12,283; Referee: Graham Scott

17 February 2010 30	Crystal Palace	1–3	Reading	London
20:00	Scannell 55'	(Report)	Church 23', 81'; Kébé 47'	Stadium: Selhurst Park; Attendance: 13,259; Referee: Dean Whitestone

20 February 2010 31	Crystal Palace	0–1	Coventry City	London
15:00		(Report)	Bell 85'	Stadium: Selhurst Park; Attendance: 13,333; Referee: Darren Deadman

27 February 2010 32	Doncaster Rovers	1–1	Crystal Palace	Doncaster
15:00	Coppinger 37'	(Report)	Djilali 67'	Stadium: Keepmoat Stadium; Attendance: 9,779; Referee: Neil Swarbrick

6 March 2010 33	Crystal Palace	1–0	Sheffield United	London
15:00	Lee 23'	(Report)		Stadium: Selhurst Park; Attendance: 13,455; Referee: Andy Penn

9 March 2010 34	Crystal Palace	0–1	Bristol City	London
20:00		(Report)	Iwelumo 73'	Stadium: Selhurst Park; Attendance: 12,844; Referee: Mick Russell

13 March 2010 35	Barnsley	0–0	Crystal Palace	Barnsley
15:00		(Report)		Stadium: Oakwell; Attendance: 11,416; Referee: Trevor Kettle

16 March 2010 36	Crystal Palace	0–1	Leicester City	London
20:00	Davis (red card) 43'	(Report)	Berner 53'	Stadium: Selhurst Park; Attendance: 12,721; Referee: Steve Tanner

20 March 2010 37	Blackpool	2–2	Crystal Palace	Blackpool
15:00	Adam 47'; Burgess 89'	(Report)	Carle 3'; Ambrose 34'	Stadium: Bloomfield Road; Attendance: 9,702; Referee: Phil Gibbs

23 March 2010 38	Nottingham Forest	2–0	Crystal Palace	Nottingham
19:45	Morgan 45+3'; Tyson 82'	(Report)	Lawrence (red card) 51'	Stadium: City Ground; Attendance: 20,025; Referee: Andy Hall

27 March 2010 39	Crystal Palace	1–2	Cardiff City	London
12:45	Hill 58'	(Report)	Gyepes 4'; Burke 67'	Stadium: Selhurst Park; Attendance: 13,464; Referee: Carl Boyeson

30 March 2010 40	Watford	1–3	Crystal Palace	Watford
19:45	Graham 83'	(Report)	John 31'; Scannell 51'; Danns 66'; Hills (yellow card) 87' (red card)	Stadium: Vicarage Road; Attendance: 15,134; Referee: Paul Taylor

3 April 2010 41	Middlesbrough	1–1	Crystal Palace	Middlesbrough
15:00	McDonald 15'	(Report)	N'Diaye 45'	Stadium: Riverside Stadium; Attendance: 18,428; Referee: Graham Salisbury

5 April 2010 42	Crystal Palace	3–1	Preston North End	London
15:00	Danns 40'; Ambrose 50'; Andrew 84'	(Report)	Treacy 8'	Stadium: Selhurst Park; Attendance: 16,642; Referee: Roger East

10 April 2010 43	Crystal Palace	0–2	Queens Park Rangers	London
15:00		(Report)	Buzsáky 11'; Gorkšs 60'	Stadium: Selhurst Park; Attendance: 20,430; Referee: Nigel Miller

17 April 2010 44	Derby County	1–1	Crystal Palace	Derby
15:00	Anderson 6'	(Report)	John 86'	Stadium: Pride Park; Attendance: 30,255; Referee: Anthony Bates

26 April 2010 45	Crystal Palace	1–1	West Bromwich Albion	London
20:00	Reid 17' (o.g.); Danns (red card) 83'	(Report)	Tamaş 21'	Stadium: Selhurst Park; Attendance: 17,798; Referee: Dean Whitestone

2 May 2010 46	Sheffield Wednesday	2–2	Crystal Palace	Sheffield
13:00	Clarke 43'; Purse 87'	(Report)	Lee 24'; Ambrose 63'	Stadium: Hillsborough; Attendance: 37,121; Referee: Mike Dean

=== Football League Cup ===
11 August 2009 Round 1	Crystal Palace	2–1	Torquay United	London
19:30	Ambrose 65', 78' (pen.)	(Report)	Sills 74'	Stadium: Selhurst Park; Attendance: 3,140; Referee: David Phillips

27 August 2009 Round 2	Crystal Palace	0–2	Manchester City	London
20:00		(Report)	Wright-Phillips 50'; Tevez 71'	Stadium: Selhurst Park; Attendance: 14,725; Referee: Darren Deadman

=== FA Cup ===
2 January 2010 Round 3	Sheffield Wednesday	1–2	Crystal Palace	Sheffield
15:00	Hill 44' (o.g.)	(Report)	Danns 19'; Andrew 68'	Stadium: Hillsborough; Attendance: 8,690; Referee: Nigel Miller

23 January 2010 Round 4	Wolverhampton Wanderers	2–2	Crystal Palace	Wolverhampton
15:00	David Jones 37'; Zubar 84'	(Report)	Lee 3'; Ambrose 49'	Stadium: Molineux; Attendance: 14,449; Referee: Chris Foy

2 February 2010 Round 4 replay	Crystal Palace	3–1	Wolverhampton Wanderers	London
19:45	Butterfield 62', 65', 68'	(Report)	Henry 90'	Stadium: Selhurst Park; Attendance: 10,282; Referee: Lee Mason

14 February 2010 Round 5	Crystal Palace	2–2	Aston Villa	London
15:45	Ertl 24'; Ambrose 70'	(Report)	Collins 35'; Petrov 87'	Stadium: Selhurst Park; Attendance: 20,486; Referee: Kevin Friend

24 February 2010 Round 5 replay	Aston Villa	3–1	Crystal Palace	Birmingham
19:45	Agbonlahor 42'; Carew 81' (pen.), 89' (pen.)	(Report)	Ambrose 73' (pen.)	Stadium: Villa Park; Attendance: 31,874; Referee: Martin Atkinson

== End-of-season awards ==
Award	Winner
Crystal Palace F.C. Player of the Year	Julián Speroni
Crystal Palace F.C. Young Player of the Year	Nathaniel Clyne
Vice Presidents' Player of the Year	Julián Speroni
Vice Presidents' Young Player of the Year	Jack Holland
Scholar Player of the Year	Jack Holland
Academy Player of the Year	Ghassimu Sow
Crystal Palace F.C. Goal of the Season	Darren Ambrose v Aston Villa (14–02–10)
Football League Special Achievement Award	Terry Byfield for 25 years' service to the club
