= 2011–12 Crystal Palace F.C. season =

English football club season

Crystal Palace
2011–12 season
- Co-chairmen: Steve Parish; Martin Long
- Manager: Dougie Freedman
- Stadium: Selhurst Park
- Championship: 17th
- FA Cup: Third round
- League Cup: Semi-finals
- Top goalscorer: League: Chris Martin; Darren Ambrose (7); All: Darren Ambrose (10)
- Highest home attendance: 21,002 vs. Reading, 29 October 2011
- Lowest home attendance: 11,853 vs. Barnsley, 20 March 2012
- Average home league attendance: 15,206
Home colours	Away colours

The 2011–12 season was Crystal Palace's seventh consecutive season in the Championship. The previous campaign had seen club legend Dougie Freedman take over as a novice manager and lead the Eagles to safety and another season in the English second tier.

== Statistics ==
=== Player statistics ===
Last updated on 28 April 2012.

No.	Pos	Nat	Player	Total		Championship		FA Cup		League Cup	
No.	Pos	Nat	Player	Apps	Goals	Apps	Goals	Apps	Goals	Apps	Goals
1	GK	(Argentina) ARG	Julián Speroni	43	0	41	0	0	0	2	0
2	DF	(England) ENG	Nathaniel Clyne	32	0	29	0	0	0	3	0
3	DF	(England) ENG	David Wright	25	0	22	0	1	0	2	0
4	DF	(Norway) NOR	Jonathan Parr	45	2	35+4	2	0	0	4+2	0
5	DF	(Republic of Ireland) IRL	Paddy McCarthy	50	2	42+1	2	0	0	6+1	0
6	DF	(England) ENG	Anthony Gardner	33	1	25+3	0	0	0	4+1	1
7	MF	(England) ENG	Darren Ambrose	42	10	25+11	7	0	0	5+1	3
8	MF	(South Africa) RSA	Kagisho Dikgacoi	31	2	25+2	2	0	0	4	0
9	FW	(Norway) NOR	Steffen Iversen	5	0	0+3	0	0+1	0	0+1	0
10	MF	(Republic of Ireland) IRL	Owen Garvan	23	3	13+9	3	1	0	0	0
11	FW	(Republic of Ireland) IRL	Sean Scannell (Note: Scannell was born in Croydon, England, but also qualified to represent the Republic of Ireland and Northern Ireland internationally through his father, as well as Jamaica, and has represented the Republic of Ireland at youth and B level.)	40	4	27+9	4	0	0	1+3	0
12	MF	(England) ENG	Alex Marrow	3	0	0+1	0	0	0	1+1	0
14	MF	(England) ENG	Kieron Cadogan	2	0	1	0	0+1	0	0	0
15	MF	(Australia) AUS	Mile Jedinak	35	1	29+2	1	0	0	2+2	0
16	FW	(England) ENG	Wilfried Zaha (Note: Zaha was born in Abidjan, Ivory Coast, but was raised in England from the age of 4, and represented them at U-19 and U-21 level before making his international debut for England in November 2012. He would switch his international allegiance back to the Ivory Coast in November 2016 and made his international debut for the Ivory Coast in January 2017.)	48	9	34+7	6	0	0	6+1	3
17	FW	(England) ENG	Glenn Murray	44	7	25+13	6	0	0	4+2	1
18	DF	(England) ENG	Lee Hills	0	0	0	0	0	0	0	0
19	FW	(Wales) WAL	Jermaine Easter	37	6	18+15	5	0	0	2+2	1
20	MF	(Wales) WAL	Jonny Williams (Note: Williams was born in Pembury, England, but also qualifies to represent Wales internationally through his father and represented them at U-17, U-19, and U-21 level before making his international debut for Wales in March 2013.)	18	1	5+9	0	0	0	4	1
21	DF	(England) ENG	Dean Moxey	29	0	20+4	0	0	0	5	0
22	DF	(England) ENG	Alex Wynter	0	0	0	0	0	0	0	0
23	FW	(England) ENG	Nathaniel Pinney	0	0	0	0	0	0	0	0
24	DF	(England) ENG	Jack Holland	0	0	0	0	0	0	0	0
25	FW	(England) ENG	Antonio Pedroza	5	0	1+3	0	1	0	0	0
26	DF	(England) ENG	Matthew Parsons	6	0	3+1	0	1	0	1	0
27	FW	(England) ENG	Ibra Sekajja (Note: Sekajja was born in Mulago, Uganda, but was raised in England and has represented them at U-16 level.)	2	0	1	0	0+1	0	0	0
28	MF	(England) ENG	Stuart O'Keefe	19	0	13	0	1	0	5	0
29	MF	(Wales) WAL	Andy Dorman (Note: Dorman was born in Chester, England, but was raised in Wales and made his international debut for Wales in May 2010.)	3	0	0+1	0	0	0	1+1	0
30	MF	(Republic of Ireland) IRL	Paul McShane	12	0	9+2	0	0	0	0+1	0
31	FW	(England) ENG	Calvin Andrew	9	1	2+4	0	1	0	2	1
32	DF	(England) ENG	Charlie Holness	0	0	0	0	0	0	0	0
33	MF	(England) ENG	Jake Caprice	0	0	0	0	0	0	0	0
34	GK	(Wales) WAL	Lewis Price (Note: Price was born in Bournemouth, England, but also qualified to represent Wales internationally and made his international debut for Wales in November 2005.)	10	0	4+1	0	1	0	4	0
35	FW	(England) ENG	Chris Martin	28	7	20+6	7	0	0	2	0
36	MF	(England) ENG	Kyle De Silva	7	0	2+4	0	1	0	0	0
38	FW	(England) ENG	Kwesi Appiah (Note: Appiah was born in Thamesmead, England, but also qualifies to represent Ghana internationally and would make his international debut for Ghana in January 2015.)	4	0	0+4	0	0	0	0	0
39	DF	(England) ENG	Quade Taylor	0	0	0	0	0	0	0	0
40	GK	(England) ENG	Ross Fitzsimons	0	0	0	0	0	0	0	0
45	MF	(England) ENG	Kadell Daniel	0	0	0	0	0	0	0	0
Players who have featured for Crystal Palace in this season before returning to their parent club:
35	DF	(England) ENG	Andrew Davies	2	0	1	0	0	0	1	0
36	DF	(Northern Ireland) NIR	Ryan McGivern	4	0	4	0	0	0	0	0
37	DF	(Bulgaria) BUL	Aleksandar Tunchev	10	0	9	0	0	0	1	0
37	DF	(Israel) ISR	Dekel Keinan	3	0	3	0	0	0	0	0
37	DF	(Republic of Ireland) IRL	John Egan	2	0	1	0	1	0	0	0
38	DF	(England) ENG	Peter Ramage	23	0	14+3	0	1	0	4+1	0
41	DF	(Sierra Leone) SLE	Mustapha Dumbuya	3	0	2	0	1	0	0	0

=== Goalscorers ===
Ranking	No.	Player	Championship	FA Cup	League Cup	Total
1	7	(England) Darren Ambrose	7	0	3	10
2	16	(England) Wilfried Zaha	6	0	3	9
3	35	(England) Chris Martin	7	0	0	7
4	17	(England) Glenn Murray	6	0	1	7
5	19	(Wales) Jermaine Easter	5	0	1	6
6	11	(Republic of Ireland) Sean Scannell	4	0	0	4
7	10	(Republic of Ireland) Owen Garvan	3	0	0	3
8	4	(Norway) Jonathan Parr	2	0	0	2
8	5	(Republic of Ireland) Paddy McCarthy	2	0	0	2
8	8	(South Africa) Kagisho Dikgacoi	2	0	0	2
11	15	(Australia) Mile Jedinak	1	0	0	1
12	6	(England) Anthony Gardner	0	0	1	1
12	20	(Wales) Jonathan Williams	0	0	1	1
12	3	(England) Calvin Andrew	0	0	1	1
Total			43	0	11	54

== Transfers ==
=== In ===
Date	Nation	Position	Player	Club From	Fee
24 May 2011	(England)	FW	Glenn Murray	Brighton & Hove Albion	Free Transfer
4 July 2011	(South Africa)	MF	Kagisho Dikgacoi	Fulham	Undisclosed
11 July 2011	(Australia)	MF	Mile Jedinak	Genclerbirligi	Free Transfer
19 July 2011	(Norway)	DF	Jonathan Parr	Aalesunds	Undisclosed
19 August 2011	(England)	DF	Anthony Gardner	Hull City	Free Transfer
31 January 2012	(England)	FW	Kwesi Appiah	Margate	Undisclosed
31 January 2012	(England)	DF	Michael Chambers	Dulwich Hamlet	Undisclosed

=== Out ===
Date	Nation	Position	Player	Club To	Fee
27 June 2011	(England)	MF	Neil Danns	Leicester City	Free Transfer
5 July 2011	(England)	DF	Adam Barrett	AFC Bournemouth	Undisclosed
29 August 2011	(England)	MF	Kieran Djilali	AFC Wimbledon	Free Transfer

=== Loan In ===
Date	Nation	Position	Player	Club From	Length
4 August 2011	(England)	DF	Andrew Davies	Stoke City	One Month
4 August 2011	(Northern Ireland)	DF	Ryan McGivern	Manchester City	One Month
5 August 2011	(England)	DF	Peter Ramage	Queens Park Rangers	One Month (extended on 31 August until January 2012)
5 August 2011	(Bulgaria)	DF	Aleksandar Tunchev	Leicester City	One Month
15 November 2011	(England)	FW	Chris Martin	Norwich City	Until January (extended on 6 January and 31 January)
22 November 2011	(Israel)	MF	Dekel Keinan	Cardiff City	Until January
6 January 2012	(Republic of Ireland)	DF	John Egan	Sunderland	One Month
6 January 2012	(Sierra Leone)	DF	Mustapha Dumbuya	Doncaster Rovers	One Month
13 January 2012	(Republic of Ireland)	DF	Paul McShane	Hull City	One Month (extended 31 January)

=== Loan Out ===
Date	Nation	Position	Player	Club To	Length
30 June 2011	(France)	MF	Alassane N'Diaye	Southend United	Full-Season (ended prematurely in August, later released)
10 November 2011	(Wales)	MF	Andy Dorman	Bristol Rovers	Until January (extended on 6 January and on 27 January)
26 January 2012	(England)	MF	Kieron Cadogan	Rotherham United	Until end of season
27 January 2012	(England)	MF	Alex Marrow	Preston North End	Until end of season
1 March 2012	(England)	FW	Calvin Andrew	Leyton Orient	Until end of season
2 March 2012	(England)	DF	Lee Hills	Southend United	Until end of season

== Club ==
=== Management ===
Position	Staff
Manager	(Scotland) Dougie Freedman
Assistant manager	(England) Lennie Lawrence
First-team coach	(Australia) Tony Popovic
Reserve team manager	(Republic of Ireland) Curtis Fleming
Goalkeeping coach	(England) Lee Turner
Chief scout	(England) Steve Kember
Fitness coach	(Australia) Scott Guyett
Academy manager	(England) Gary Issott
Physiotherapists	(England) Alex Manos and John Stannard

== League table ==
Pos	Team	Pld	W	D	L	GF	GA	GD	Pts
15	Ipswich Town	46	17	10	19	69	77	−8	61
16	Millwall	46	15	12	19	55	57	−2	57
17	Crystal Palace	46	13	17	16	46	51	−5	56
18	Peterborough United	46	13	11	22	67	77	−10	50
19	Nottingham Forest	46	14	8	24	48	63	−15	50

Updated to match(es) played on 28 April 2012. Source: BBC Sport
Rules for classification: 1) points; 2) goal difference; 3) number of goals scored.

== Matches ==
=== Results round by round ===
Round	1	2	3	4	5	6	7	8	9	10	11	12	13	14	15	16	17	18	19	20	21	22	23	24	25	26	27	28	29	30	31	32	33	34	35	36	37	38	39	40	41	42	43	44	45	46
Ground	A	H	H	A	H	A	H	A	A	H	A	H	A	H	H	A	A	H	H	A	A	H	A	A	H	H	A	H	A	A	H	A	H	A	A	H	H	A	H	H	A	H	H	A	A	H
Result	L	W	W	W	D	L	L	L	W	D	W	W	W	D	D	L	L	D	D	L	W	W	L	W	L	D	L	D	D	D	W	D	W	D	D	D	W	L	D	L	L	L	D	L	D	L
Position	18	8	5	4	5	8	12	12	9	12	8	5	3	3	4	6	9	10	10	13	11	8	10	8	11	13	13	15	14	14	12	13	13	12	11	13	11	14	13	15	16	16	16	16	17	17

Source: stats.football365.com
A = Away; H = Home; W = Win; D = Draw; L = Loss

=== Preseason ===
15 July 2011	Basingstoke Town	1–2	Crystal Palace XI	Basingstoke
19:00	Gradwell 85'	[ Report]	Zaha 17'; Ambrose 75' (pen.)	Stadium: The Camrose

19 July 2011	Wycombe Wanderers	0–0	Crystal Palace	High Wycombe
19:45		[ Report]		Stadium: Adams Park; Attendance: 1,426

20 July 2011	East Grinstead Town	0–4	Crystal Palace XI	East Grinstead
19:30		[ Report]	Taylor 37'; Cadogan 43'; Andrew 54'; Pinney 90'	Stadium: GAC Stadium

22 July 2011	Crawley Town	0–0	Crystal Palace	Crawley
19:45		[ Report]		Stadium: Broadfield Stadium; Attendance: 2,109

26 July 2011	Crystal Palace	1–0	Norwich City	London
19:30	Pinney 89'	[ Report]		Stadium: Selhurst Park; Attendance: 5,642; Referee: Pat Miller

27 July 2011	Dulwich Hamlet	4–3	Crystal Palace XI	London
19:45	James 4', 8', 61'; Junior Kadi 80' (pen.)	[ Report]	Pinney 15', 33'; 90' (o.g.)	Stadium: Champion Hill; Attendance: 646

30 July 2011	Bournemouth	3–1	Crystal Palace	Bournemouth
15:00	Brillault 63' (o.g.); Barrett 74'; Taylor 87'	[ Report]	Scannell 52'	Stadium: Dean Court; Attendance: 2,977

2 August 2011	Bromley	1–2	Crystal Palace XI	London
19:45	Aaron Rhule 10'	[ Report]	Joe Dolan 16' (o.g.)); Sekajja 75'	Stadium: Hayes Lane; Referee: Michael O'Keefe

=== Football League Championship ===
==== August ====
6 August 2011	Peterborough United	2–1	Crystal Palace	Peterborough
15:00	McCann 58'; Ball 73'	Report	Scannell 33'	Stadium: London Road; Attendance: 11,604; Referee: James Linington

13 August 2011	Crystal Palace	2–0	Burnley	London
15:00	Parr 10'; Garvan 67' (pen.)	Report	Bartley (red card) 90+4'	Stadium: Selhurst Park; Attendance: 13,167; Referee: Brendan Malone

16 August 2011	Crystal Palace	2–1	Coventry City	London
20:00	Scannell 90'; Easter 90+6'	Report	Jutkiewicz 48'	Stadium: Selhurst Park; Attendance: 12,330; Referee: Pat Miller

20 August 2011	Hull City	0–1	Crystal Palace	Kingston upon Hull
15:00		Report	Chester 15' (o.g.))	Stadium: KC Stadium; Attendance: 17,797; Referee: Graham Salisbury

27 August 2011	Crystal Palace	1–1	Blackpool	London
15:00	Murray 79'	Report	Baptiste 41'	Stadium: Selhurst Park; Attendance: 14,776; Referee: Andre Marriner

==== September ====
10 September 2011	Leeds United	3–2	Crystal Palace	Leeds
15:00	McCormack 8', 84'; Becchio 71'	Report	McCarthy 12'; Scannell 21'	Stadium: Elland Road; Attendance: 23,916; Referee: Scott Mathieson

17 September 2011	Crystal Palace	0–1	Middlesbrough	London
15:00		Report	Emnes 65'; Bennett (yellow card) 75' (red card)	Stadium: Selhurst Park; Attendance: 15,198; Referee: Gary Sutton (referee)

24 September 2011	Doncaster Rovers	1–0	Crystal Palace	Doncaster
15:00	Oster 65'	Report		Stadium: Keepmoat Stadium; Attendance: 9,362; Referee: Chris Sarginson

27 September 2011	Brighton & Hove Albion	1–3	Crystal Palace	Brighton
19:45	Mackail-Smith 7'	Report	Zaha 80'; Ambrose 89'; Murray 90+1'	Stadium: Amex Stadium; Attendance: 20,968; Referee: Andy D'Urso

==== October ====
1 October 2011	Crystal Palace	2–2	West Ham United	London
15:00	Ambrose 6'; Murray 52'	Report	Nolan 16'; Carew 80'	Stadium: Selhurst Park; Attendance: 20,074; Referee: Kevin Wright

15 October 2011	Watford	0–2	Crystal Palace	Watford
15:00		Report	Zaha 66'; Easter 90+2'	Stadium: Vicarage Road; Attendance: 12,559; Referee: Mark Halsey

18 November 2011	Crystal Palace	1–0	Bristol City	London
20:00	Murray 81' (pen.)	Report		Stadium: Selhurst Park; Attendance: 11,869; Referee: Iain Williamson

22 October 2011	Ipswich Town	0–1	Crystal Palace	Ipswich
15:00	Cresswell (yellow card) 90+2' (red card)	Report	McCarthy 55'	Stadium: Portman Road; Attendance: 24,763; Referee: David Phillips

29 October 2011	Crystal Palace	0–0	Reading	London
15:00		Report		Stadium: Selhurst Park; Attendance: 21,002; Referee: Andy Woolmer

==== November ====
1 November 2011	Crystal Palace	0–0	Portsmouth	London
20:00		Report		Stadium: Selhurst Park; Attendance: 12,933; Referee: Darren Drysdale

5 November 2011	Cardiff City	2–0	Crystal Palace	Cardiff
15:00	Miller 69'; Whittingham 80'	Report		Stadium: Cardiff City Stadium; Attendance: 22,032; Referee: Steve Rushton

20 November 2011	Leicester City	3–0	Crystal Palace	Leicester
15:00	Beckford 55'; Gallagher 71', 74'	Report		Stadium: King Power Stadium; Attendance: 22,449; Referee: Mark Brown

26 November 2011	Crystal Palace	0–0	Millwall	London
15:00		Report		Stadium: Selhurst Park; Attendance: 15,150; Referee: David Webb

==== December ====
2 December 2011	Crystal Palace	1–1	Derby County	London
19:45	Martin 15'	Report	McCarthy 75' (o.g.))	Stadium: Selhurst Park; Attendance: 14,338; Referee: Andy D'Urso

6 December 2011	Barnsley	2–1	Crystal Palace	Barnsley
19:45	Vaz Tê 1', 77'	Report	Easter 33'	Stadium: Oakwell; Attendance: 9,524; Referee: Anthony Bates

10 December 2011	Nottingham Forest	0–1	Crystal Palace	Nottingham
15:00		Report	Murray 56'	Stadium: City Ground; Attendance: 21,405; Referee: Phil Gibbs

19 December 2011	Crystal Palace	1–0	Birmingham City	London
19:45	Dikgacoi 84'	Report		Stadium: Selhurst Park; Attendance: 12,057; Referee: Keith Stroud

26 December 2011	Southampton	2–0	Crystal Palace	Southampton
13:00	Guly 34', 77'	Report		Stadium: St Mary's Stadium; Attendance: 31,524; Referee: Graham Salisbury

31 December 2011	Millwall	0–1	Crystal Palace	London
13:00		Report	Easter 23'	Stadium: The Den; Attendance: 16,085; Referee: Roger East

==== January ====
2 January 2012	Crystal Palace	1–2	Leicester City	London
13:00	Parr 41'	Report	Danns 19'; Bamba 37'; Howard (red card) 87'	Stadium: Selhurst Park; Attendance: 14,468; Referee: James Linington

14 January 2012	Crystal Palace	1–1	Leeds United	London
15:00	Martin 6'; Scannell (yellow card) 45' (red card)	Report	Snodgrass 63'	Stadium: Selhurst Park; Attendance: 17,796; Referee: David Coote

21 January 2012	Blackpool	2–1	Crystal Palace	Blackpool
15:00	Grandin 85'; Basham 90'	Report	Garvan 27' (pen.)	Stadium: Bloomfield Road; Attendance: 12,053; Referee: Nigel Miller

31 January 2012	Crystal Palace	1–1	Brighton & Hove Albion	London
20:00	Martin 64' (pen.)	Report	Barnes 74' (pen.)	Stadium: Selhurst Park; Attendance: 17,271; Referee: Stuart Attwell

==== February ====
4 February 2012	Middlesbrough	0–0	Crystal Palace	Middlesbrough
15:00		Report		Stadium: Riverside Stadium; Attendance: 15,725; Referee: Mark Heywood

14 February 2012	Bristol City	2–2	Crystal Palace	Bristol
19:45	Pitman 77', 90+3'	Report	Zaha 14'; Ambrose 69' (pen.)	Stadium: Ashton Gate; Attendance: 12,470; Referee: Lee Collins

18 February 2012	Crystal Palace	4–0	Watford	London
15:00	Zaha 22'; Martin 38', 50'; Dikgacoi 64'	Report		Stadium: Selhurst Park; Attendance: 13,324; Referee: Craig Pawson

25 February 2012	West Ham United	0–0	Crystal Palace	London
12:45		Report		Stadium: Boleyn Ground; Attendance: 34,900; Referee: Graham Salisbury

==== March ====
3 March 2012	Crystal Palace	1–0	Peterborough United	London
15:00	Jedinak 76'	Report		Stadium: Selhurst Park; Attendance: 18,559; Referee: Scott Mathieson

6 March 2012	Coventry City	1–1	Crystal Palace	Coventry
19:45	McDonald 80'	Report	Ambrose 4' (pen.)	Stadium: Ricoh Arena; Attendance: 12,054; Referee: Mark Brown

10 March 2012	Burnley	1–1	Crystal Palace	Burnley
15:00	Rodriguez 2' (pen.)	Report	Ambrose 63' (pen.); Zaha (red card) 72'	Stadium: Turf Moor; Attendance: 13,216; Referee: Dean Whitestone

17 March 2012	Crystal Palace	0–0	Hull City	London
15:00		Report		Stadium: Selhurst Park; Attendance: 13,324; Referee: Darren Drysdale

20 March 2012	Crystal Palace	1–0	Barnsley	London
20:00	Scannell 90+3'	Report		Stadium: Selhurst Park; Attendance: 11,853; Referee: Trevor Kettle

24 March 2012	Derby County	3–2	Crystal Palace	Derby
15:00	S. Davies 6'; Hendrick 29'; Robinson 49' (pen.)	Report	Martin 79'; Ambrose 90'	Stadium: Pride Park Stadium; Attendance: 25,222; Referee: Mick Russell

27 March 2012	Crystal Palace	1–1	Doncaster Rovers	London
20:00	Easter 57'	Report	Brown 76'	Stadium: Selhurst Park; Attendance: 13,401; Referee: Darren Deadman

31 March 2012	Crystal Palace	0–3	Nottingham Forest	London
15:00		Report	Majewski 53', 72', 82'	Stadium: Selhurst Park; Attendance: 14,928; Referee: Oliver Langford

==== April ====
7 April 2012	Birmingham City	3–1	Crystal Palace	Birmingham
15:00	Burke 21'; Fahey 22'; Murphy 32'	Report	Garvan 45'	Stadium: St Andrew's; Attendance: 21,932; Referee: Geoff Eltringham

9 April 2012	Crystal Palace	0–2	Southampton	London
15:00		Report	Lambert 39', 56'	Stadium: Selhurst Park; Attendance: 18,753; Referee: Gary Sutton

14 April 2012	Crystal Palace	1–1	Ipswich Town	London
15:00	Martin 36'	Report	Scotland 59'	Stadium: Selhurst Park; Attendance: 17,961; Referee: Fred Graham

17 April 2012	Portsmouth	2–1	Crystal Palace	Portsmouth
19:45	Allan 32'; Halford 55'	Report	Ambrose 71' (pen.)	Stadium: Fratton Park; Attendance: 14,847; Referee: Simon Hooper

21 April 2012	Reading	2–2	Crystal Palace	Reading
15:00	Gorkšs 20'; Le Fondre 53'	Report	Zaha 14'; Murray 76'	Stadium: Madjeski Stadium; Attendance: 23,431; Referee: Andy D'Urso

28 April 2012	Crystal Palace	1–2	Cardiff City	London
12:30	Zaha 13'	Report	Whittingham 53'; Cowie 62'	Stadium: Selhurst Park; Attendance: 15,510; Referee: Lee Mason

=== Football League Cup ===
23 August 2011 1	Crystal Palace	2–0	Crawley Town	London
19:30	Zaha 54', 58'	Report		Stadium: Selhurst Park; Attendance: 8,901; Referee: Michael Naylor

13 September 2011 2	Crystal Palace	2–1	Wigan Athletic	London
20:00	Ambrose 24'; Williams 30'	Report	Watson 90+2'	Stadium: Selhurst Park; Attendance: 7,649; Referee: Keith Stroud

20 September 2011 3	Crystal Palace	2–1	Middlesbrough	London
20:00	Zaha 18'; Andrew 52'	Report	Zemmama 55'	Stadium: Selhurst Park; Attendance: 5,448; Referee: Graham Scott

25 October 2011 4	Crystal Palace	2–0	Southampton	London
19:45	Ambrose 73'; Easter 82' (pen.)	Report		Stadium: Selhurst Park; Attendance: 11,681; Referee: Mark Haywood

30 November 2011 5	Manchester United	1–2 (a.e.t.)	Crystal Palace	Manchester
19:45	Macheda 69' (pen.)	Report	Ambrose 65'; Murray 98'	Stadium: Old Trafford; Attendance: 52,623; Referee: Chris Foy

10 January 2012 Semi-final; First leg	Crystal Palace	1–0	Cardiff City	London
20:00	Gardner 43'	Report		Stadium: Selhurst Park; Attendance: 22,147; Referee: Mike Dean

24 January 2012 Semi-final; Second leg	Cardiff City	1–0 (1–1 agg.) (3–1 p)	Crystal Palace	Cardiff
19:45	Gardner 7' (o.g.)	Report	McCarthy (yellow card) 78' (red card)	Stadium: Cardiff City Stadium; Attendance: 25,652; Referee: Howard Webb
	Penalties
	Miller (penalty missed); Conway (penalty scored); Gestede (penalty scored); Whittingham (penalty scored)		(penalty missed) Easter; (penalty missed) Scannell; (penalty scored) Jedinak; (penalty missed) Parr

=== FA Cup ===
7 January 2012 3	Derby County	1–0	Crystal Palace	Derby
15:00	Robinson 9'	Report		Stadium: Pride Park Stadium; Attendance: 10,113; Referee: Darren Drysdale

== End-of-season awards ==
Award	Winner
Crystal Palace F.C. Player of the Year	Jonathan Parr
Crystal Palace F.C. Young Player of the Year	Wilfried Zaha
Vice Presidents' Player of the Year	Jonathan Parr
Vice Presidents' Young Player of the Year	Jonathan Williams
Scholar Player of the Year	Jonathan Williams
Academy Player of the Year	Reise Allassani
Crystal Palace F.C. Goal of the Season	Darren Ambrose (vs. Manchester United, 30 November)
