= 2010–11 Crystal Palace F.C. season =

English football club season

Crystal Palace
2010–11 season
- Co-chairmen: Steve Parish; Martin Long
- Manager: George Burley (until 1 January); Dougie Freedman (from 2 January)
- Stadium: Selhurst Park
- Championship: 20th
- FA Cup: Third round proper
- Football League Cup: Second round
- Top goalscorer: League: James Vaughan (9); All: James Vaughan/Neil Danns (9)
- Highest home attendance: 20,142 (vs Leeds United, 25 April 2011))
- Lowest home attendance: 12,353 (vs Watford, 9 November 2010)
- Average home league attendance: 15,457
Home colours	Away colours

The Crystal Palace F.C. season 2010–11 was Crystal Palace's sixth consecutive season in the Championship. The previous season had seen Palace finish one place above the relegation zone, having been deducted ten points for going into administration. The CPFC 2010 consortium completed a takeover of the club in the close season and installed former Scotland manager George Burley as the club's new boss, with club legend Dougie Freedman continuing his role as assistant manager. However, after a poor start to the season, Burley was sacked on New Year's Day and Freedman named manager the following week. Under Freedman fortunes improved, and the club secured another season at Championship level shortly before the conclusion of the campaign.

== Statistics ==
Last updated on May 7, 2011.

No.	Pos	Nat	Player	Total		Championship		FA Cup		League Cup	
No.	Pos	Nat	Player	Apps	Goals	Apps	Goals	Apps	Goals	Apps	Goals
1	GK	(Argentina) ARG	Julián Speroni	48	0	45	0	1	0	2	0
2	DF	(England) ENG	Nathaniel Clyne	49	0	46	0	1	0	2	0
3	DF	(England) ENG	David Wright	29	0	27+1	0	1	0	0	0
4	DF	(Jamaica) JAM	Claude Davis	24	0	17+7	0	0	0	0	0
5	DF	(Republic of Ireland) IRL	Paddy McCarthy	46	1	43	1	1	0	2	0
6	DF	(England) ENG	Adam Barrett	9	0	5+2	0	0	0	2	0
7	MF	(England) ENG	Darren Ambrose	29	7	27+1	7	0	0	1	0
8	MF	(England) ENG	Neil Danns (Note: Danns was born in Liverpool, England, but also qualified to represent Guyana internationally through his grandfather and would make his international debut for Guyana in March 2015.)	38	9	36+1	8	1	1	0	0
9	FW	(Republic of Ireland) IRL	Alan Lee	4	2	3	1	0	0	1	1
9/20	FW	(England) ENG	James Vaughan	30	9	28+2	9	0	0	0	0
9	FW	(Norway) NOR	Steffen Iversen	18	2	11+6	2	1	0	0	0
10	MF	(Republic of Ireland) IRL	Owen Garvan	28	3	26	3	1	0	1	0
11	MF	(Wales) WAL	Andy Dorman (Note: Dorman was born in Chester, England, but was raised in Wales and made his international debut for Wales in May 2010.)	23	1	14+6	1	1	0	2	0
12	FW	(England) ENG	Calvin Andrew	15	0	1+12	0	0+1	0	1	0
13	GK	(Wales) WAL	Lewis Price (Note: Price was born in Bournemouth, England, but also qualified to represent Wales internationally and made his international debut for Wales in November 2005.)	1	-1	1	-1	0	0	0	0
14	FW	(Republic of Ireland) IRL	Sean Scannell (Note: Scannell was born in Croydon, England, but also qualified to represent the Republic of Ireland and Northern Ireland internationally through his father, as well as Jamaica, and has represented the Republic of Ireland at youth and B level.)	19	2	5+14	2	0	0	0	0
15	MF	(England) ENG	Kieron Cadogan	19	1	7+9	1	1	0	1+1	0
16	FW	(Ivory Coast) CIV	Wilfried Zaha (Note: Zaha was born in Abidjan, Ivory Coast, but was raised in England from the age of 4, and represented them at U-19 and U-21 level before making his international debut for England in November 2012. He would switch his international allegiance back to the Ivory Coast in November 2016 and made his international debut for the Ivory Coast in January 2017.)	44	1	26+15	1	0+1	0	1+1	0
19	DF	(England) ENG	Julian Bennett	14	1	10+3	1	0	0	1	0
19	FW	(Wales) WAL	Jermaine Easter	14	2	6+8	2	0	0	0	0
20	MF	(Netherlands) NED	Edgar Davids (Note: Davids was born in Paramaribo, Suriname, but was raised in the Netherlands and made his international debut for the Netherlands in April 1994.)	7	0	6	0	0	0	1	0
21	MF	(England) ENG	Kieran Djilali	16	0	10+4	0	0	0	1+1	0
23	FW	(England) ENG	Nathaniel Pinney	1	0	0	0	0	0	1	0
25	MF	(France) FRA	Alassane N'Diaye	13	0	4+8	0	1	0	0	0
26	DF	(England) ENG	Matthew Parsons	3	0	2	0	0	0	0+1	0
27	FW	(England) ENG	Ibra Sekajja (Note: Sekajja was born in Mulago, Uganda, but was raised in England and has represented them at U-16 level.)	1	1	0+1	1	0	0	0	0
28	MF	(England) ENG	Stuart O'Keefe	4	0	1+3	0	0	0	0	0
29	FW	(England) ENG	Jonathan Obika	8	0	0+7	0	0	0	0+1	0
29	DF	(England) ENG	Dean Moxey	17	1	17	1	0	0	0	0
30	MF	(England) ENG	Alex Marrow	22	0	20+1	0	0	0	1	0
31	DF	(England) ENG	Anthony Gardner	29	1	26+2	1	1	0	0	0
32	FW	(Spain) ESP	Pablo Couñago	32	2	17+13	2	0+1	0	1	0
33	MF	(Netherlands) NED	Kemy Agustien (Note: Agustien was born in Willemstad, the Netherlands Antilles (now Curaçao), but also qualified to represent the Netherlands internationally and represented them at U-19, U-20, and U-21 level before making his international debut for Curaçao in June 2015.)	8	0	6+2	0	0	0	0	0
34	MF	(South Africa) RSA	Kagisho Dikgacoi	13	1	13	1	0	0	0	0

== Club ==
=== Kits ===
Supplier: Nike / Sponsor: GAC Logistics

Home	Away	Goalkeeper

=== Management ===
Position	Staff
Manager	(Scotland) George Burley (July–January) (Scotland) Dougie Freedman (January-)
Assistant manager	(Scotland) Dougie Freedman (July–January) (England) Lennie Lawrence (January-)
First team coach	(Australia) Tony Popovic (February-)
Reserve team manager	(England) Dean Austin (July–May)
Goalkeeping coach	(England) Malcolm Webster (July–January) (England) Lee Turner (January-)
Chief scout	(England) Steve Kember (December-)
Fitness coach	(England) Chris Short (July–November) (Australia) Scott Guyett (November–May)
Academy manager	(England) Gary Issott (Oct-)
Physiotherapists	(England) Alex Manos & John Stannard

== League table ==
Pos	Team	Pld	W	D	L	GF	GA	GD	Pts	Promotion, qualification or relegation
18	Coventry City	46	14	13	19	54	58	−4	55	
19	Derby County	46	13	10	23	58	71	−13	49	
20	Crystal Palace	46	12	12	22	44	69	−25	48	
21	Doncaster Rovers	46	11	15	20	55	81	−26	48	
22	Preston North End (R)	46	10	12	24	54	79	−25	42	Relegation to Football League One

Updated to match(es) played on 7 May 2011. Source: The Football League
Rules for classification: 1) points; 2) goal difference; 3) number of goals scored.
(R) Relegated

== Matches ==
=== Preseason ===
13 July 2010	Crawley Town	1–0	Crystal Palace	Crawley
19:45	Tubbs 15'	(Report)		Stadium: Broadfield Stadium; Attendance: 1,447

14 July 2010	Sutton United	2–1	Crystal Palace XI	London
20:00	Jerson Dos Santos 8' (pen.); Tom Davis 75'	(Report)	Pinney 45'	Stadium: Gander Green Lane; Attendance: 572

17 July 2010	Crystal Palace	0–1	Chelsea	London
15:15		(Report)	Essien 58'	Stadium: Selhurst Park; Attendance: 21,345; Referee: Iain Williamson

21 July 2010	Dorchester Town	3–3	Crystal Palace	Dorchester
19:45	Douglas 13'; K. Hill 30'; Nathan Walker 63'	(Report)	Ambrose 42', 57'; Zaha 69'	Stadium: Avenue Stadium

23 July 2010	Exeter City	0–2	Crystal Palace	Tiverton
18:30		(Report)	Ambrose 68' (pen.), 70'	Stadium: Ladysmead; Attendance: 1,107

27 July 2010	Bromley	0–0	Crystal Palace	London
19:45		(Report)		Stadium: Hayes Lane

30 July 2010	Brentford	1–1	Crystal Palace	London
20:00	Forster 27'	(Report)	Cadogan 60'	Stadium: Griffin Park; Attendance: 2,166; Referee: Andy D'Urso

3 August 2010	Dulwich Hamlet	0–2	Crystal Palace XI	London
19:45		(Report)	Sekajja 35'; Rhys Williamson-Murrell 71'	Stadium: Champion Hill

=== Results per matchday ===
Matchday	1	2	3	4	5	6	7	8	9	10	11	12	13	14	15	16	17	18	19	20	21	22	23	24	25	26	27	28	29	30	31	32	33	34	35	36	37	38	39	40	41	42	43	44	45	46
Ground	H	A	H	A	A	H	H	A	A	H	H	A	A	H	A	H	H	A	H	A	H	A	H	A	A	H	A	H	A	H	A	H	A	H	A	H	A	H	H	A	A	H	A	H	A	H
Result	W	L	L	L	L	W	D	L	D	L	L	W	L	L	L	W	W	L	W	L	D	L	D	D	L	W	L	D	D	W	L	W	L	D	L	W	L	D	W	L	D	L	D	W	D	L
Position	7	10	15	20	21	19	19	20	22	23	23	22	23	24	24	24	23	23	22	22	23	23	24	24	24	23	22	22	22	21	21	21	21	21	21	21	21	21	21	21	21	21	21	20	20	20

Source: Statto.com
A = Away; H = Home; W = Win; D = Draw; L = Loss

=== Football League Championship ===
7 August 2010	Crystal Palace	3–2	Leicester City	London
15:00	Zaha 19'; Ambrose 26'; Lee 41'	(Report)	King 57'; Campbell 84'	Stadium: Selhurst Park; Attendance: 17,486; Referee: Andy Woolmer

14 August 2010	Barnsley	1–0	Crystal Palace	Barnsley
15:00	McCarthy 35' (o.g.)	(Report)		Stadium: Oakwell; Attendance: 11,353; Referee: Neil Swarbrick

21 August 2010	Crystal Palace	1–2	Ipswich Town	London
15:00	Davis (red card) 50'; Danns 90+3'	(Report)	Leadbitter 51' (pen.); Edwards 56'; Townsend (red card) 73'	Stadium: Selhurst Park; Attendance: 15,781; Referee: Jonathan Moss

28 August 2010	Scunthorpe United	3–0	Crystal Palace	Scunthorpe
15:00	Forte 33', 45+1'; O'Connor 71' (pen.)	(Report)		Stadium: Glanford Park; Attendance: 5,292; Referee: Dean Whitestone

11 September 2010	Reading	3–0	Crystal Palace	Reading
15:00	Long 37' (pen.); Harte 65' (pen.); Kébé 90+2'	(Report)		Stadium: Madejski Stadium; Attendance: 17,921; Referee: Keith Hill

14 September 2010	Crystal Palace	4–1	Portsmouth	London
20:00	Vaughan 14', 55', 59'; Danns 81' (pen.)	(Report)	Kitson 24'	Stadium: Selhurst Park; Attendance: 14,219; Referee: Peter Walton

18 September 2010	Crystal Palace	0–0	Burnley	London
15:00		(Report)		Stadium: Selhurst Park; Attendance: 14,451; Referee: James Linington

25 September 2010	Derby County	5–0	Crystal Palace	Derby
15:00	Bueno 14', 62'; Commons 41'; Green 68'; Kuqi 73'	(Report)	Vaughan (red card) 21'	Stadium: Pride Park; Attendance: 28,258; Referee: Anthony Bates

28 September 2010	Cardiff City	0–0	Crystal Palace	Cardiff
19:45		(Report)		Stadium: Cardiff City Stadium; Attendance: 22,007; Referee: Steve Tanner

2 October 2010	Crystal Palace	1–2	Queens Park Rangers	London
15:00	Cadogan 89'	(Report)	Taarabt 49'; Helguson 90+3'	Stadium: Selhurst Park; Attendance: 17,171; Referee: Kevin Friend

16 October 2010	Crystal Palace	0–1	Millwall	London
15:00	Davis (red card) 90+1'	(Report)	T. Robinson 53'	Stadium: Selhurst Park; Attendance: 19,131; Referee: Mick Russell

19 October 2010	Norwich City	1–2	Crystal Palace	Norwich
19:45	Holt 43'	(Report)	Bennett 56'; Gardner 63'	Stadium: Carrow Road; Attendance: 24,975; Referee: Grant Hegley

23 October 2010	Preston North End	4–3	Crystal Palace	Preston
15:00	Parkin 13', 25'; Treacy 36'; Davidson 66'	(Report)	Garvan 20'; Dorman 69'; Vaughan 80'	Stadium: Deepdale; Attendance: 10,116; Referee: Geoff Eltringham

30 October 2010	Crystal Palace	0–3	Swansea City	London
15:00		(Report)	Sinclair 6'; Pratley 71'; Allen 80'	Stadium: Selhurst Park; Attendance: 16,223; Referee: Fred Graham

6 November 2010	Middlesbrough	2–1	Crystal Palace	Middlesbrough
15:00	Kink 76'; McCarthy 85' (o.g.)	(Report)	Couñago 29'	Stadium: Riverside Stadium; Attendance: 15,400; Referee: Mark Haywood

9 November 2010	Crystal Palace	3–2	Watford	London
20:00	Ambrose 18'; Garvan 56', 59'	(Report)	Graham 48'; Mutch 52'	Stadium: Selhurst Park; Attendance: 12,353; Referee: Andy Penn

13 November 2010	Crystal Palace	2–0	Coventry City	London
15:00	Ambrose 33', 54' (pen.)	(Report)		Stadium: Selhurst Park; Attendance: 13,278; Referee: Pat Miller

20 November 2010	Sheffield United	3–2	Crystal Palace	Sheffield
17:20	Cresswell 39' (pen.); Evans 85'; Bogdanović 87' (pen.); Bogdanović (red card) 90+4'	(Report)	Danns 18' (pen.); Garvan (yellow card) (red card) 37'; Vaughan 63'	Stadium: Bramall Lane; Attendance: 20,240; Referee: Anthony Taylor

27 November 2010	Crystal Palace	1–0	Doncaster Rovers	London
15:00	Couñago 35'	(Report)		Stadium: Selhurst Park; Attendance: 12,470; Referee: Andy D'Urso

4 December 2010	Leeds United	2–1	Crystal Palace	Leeds
15:00	Becchio 81', 83'	(Report)	Danns 44'	Stadium: Elland Road; Attendance: 25,476; Referee: Andy Haines

11 December 2010	Crystal Palace	0–0	Hull City	London
17:20		(Report)		Stadium: Selhurst Park; Attendance: 13,341; Referee: Steve Tanner

18 December 2010	Nottingham Forest	3–0	Crystal Palace	Nottingham
15:00	Chambers 31'; Tudgay 46'; McCleary 85'	(Report)		Stadium: City Ground; Attendance: 22,359; Referee: Neil Swarbrick

28 December 2010	Bristol City	1–1	Crystal Palace	Bristol
15:00	Pitman 90+5' (pen.)	(Report)	Danns 2'	Stadium: Ashton Gate; Attendance: 15,760; Referee: Paul Tierney

1 January 2011	Millwall	3–0	Crystal Palace	London
13:30	Puncheon 8', 65', 71'	(Report)		Stadium: The Den; Attendance: 16,170; Referee: Neil Swarbrick

3 January 2011	Crystal Palace	1–0	Preston North End	London
15:00	Iversen 58'	(Report)		Stadium: Selhurst Park; Attendance: 14,061; Referee: Keith Hill

15 January 2011	Swansea City	3–0	Crystal Palace	Swansea
12:45	Pratley 43'; Sinclair 56' (pen.), 61' (pen.)	(Report)		Stadium: Liberty Stadium; Attendance: 13,369; Referee: Jonathan Moss

22 January 2011	Crystal Palace	0–0	Bristol City	London
15:00		(Report)		Stadium: Selhurst Park; Attendance: 14,128; Referee: Michael Naylor

29 January 2011	Crystal Palace	0–0	Norwich City	London
15:00		(Report)		Stadium: Selhurst Park; Attendance: 16,327; Referee: Danny McDermid

1 February 2011	Watford	1–1	Crystal Palace	Watford
19:45	Weimann 10'	(Report)	Vaughan 40'	Stadium: Vicarage Road; Attendance: 12,664; Referee: Keith Stroud

5 February 2011	Crystal Palace	1–0	Middlesbrough	London
15:00	Vaughan 36'	(Report)		Stadium: Selhurst Park; Attendance: 14,060; Referee: Roger East

12 February 2011	Coventry City	2–1	Crystal Palace	Coventry
15:00	Wood 34'; King 79'	(Report)	Iversen 90+1'	Stadium: Ricoh Arena; Attendance: 16,454; Referee: Kevin Wright

19 February 2011	Crystal Palace	1–0	Sheffield United	London
15:00	Ambrose 69'	(Report)		Stadium: Selhurst Park; Attendance: 14,214; Referee: Keith Hill

22 February 2011	Portsmouth	1–0	Crystal Palace	Portsmouth
19:45	Nugent 65'	(Report)		Stadium: Fratton Park; Attendance: 15,641; Referee: Brendan Malone

26 February 2011	Crystal Palace	3–3	Reading	London
15:00	Ambrose 1'; Danns 25'; Easter 68'	(Report)	Long 30' (pen.); Kébé 49'; Hunt 73'	Stadium: Selhurst Park; Attendance: 13,845; Referee: Anthony Bates

5 March 2011	Burnley	1–0	Crystal Palace	Burnley
15:00	Rodriguez 3'	(Report)		Stadium: Turf Moor; Attendance: 14,848; Referee: Andy D'Urso

8 March 2011	Crystal Palace	1–0	Cardiff City	London
20:00	Dikgacoi 82'	(Report)		Stadium: Selhurst Park; Attendance: 12,549; Referee: Mick Russell

12 March 2011	Queens Park Rangers	2–1	Crystal Palace	London
15:00	Helguson 20', 54' (pen.)	(Report)	Vaughan 40'; McCarthy (red card) 53'	Stadium: Loftus Road; Attendance: 18,116; Referee: Martin Atkinson

19 March 2011	Crystal Palace	2–2	Derby County	London
15:00	Moxey 21'; Ambrose 88' (pen.)	(Report)	Pearson 7'; Ward 63'	Stadium: Selhurst Park; Attendance: 14,686; Referee: Jonathan Moss

2 April 2011	Crystal Palace	2–1	Barnsley	London
15:00	Danns 29'; Vaughan 75' (pen.)	(Report)	Harewood 43'	Stadium: Selhurst Park; Attendance: 19,344; Referee: Karl Evans

9 April 2011	Ipswich Town	2–1	Crystal Palace	Ipswich
15:00	Carson 39', 66'	(Report)	McCarthy 73'	Stadium: Portman Road; Attendance: 24,378; Referee: Graham Salisbury

12 April 2011	Leicester City	1–1	Crystal Palace	Leicester
19:45	Oakley 58'	(Report)	Scannell 31'; Zaha (red card) 90+7'	Stadium: Walkers Stadium; Attendance: 22,303; Referee: Iain Williamson

16 April 2011	Crystal Palace	1–2	Scunthorpe United	London
15:00	Scannell 70' (red card) 90+2'	(Report)	Mirfin 25'; Núñez 57'; Garner (yellow card) (yellow-red card) 86'	Stadium: Selhurst Park; Attendance: 17,810; Referee: Keith Stroud

22 April 2011	Doncaster Rovers	0–0	Crystal Palace	Doncaster
15:00		(Report)		Stadium: Keepmoat Stadium; Attendance: 14,312; Referee: Colin Webster

25 April 2011	Crystal Palace	1–0	Leeds United	London
15:00	Danns 2' (Note: Sources at the time of the game credit the goal to Danns, but later ones award it to Jermaine Easter.) (yellow card) (yellow-red card) 90+8'	(Report)		Stadium: Selhurst Park; Attendance: 20,142; Referee: Neil Swarbrick

30 April 2011	Hull City	1–1	Crystal Palace	Kingston upon Hull
15:00	Gerrard 31'	(Report)	Sekajja 88'	Stadium: KC Stadium; Attendance: 20,407; Referee: Andy Woolmer

7 May 2011	Crystal Palace	0–3	Nottingham Forest	London
12:45	Moxey (red card) 24'	(Report)	McGugan 17'; Tudgay 70'; McGoldrick 80'	Stadium: Selhurst Park; Attendance: 18,443; Referee: Steve Tanner

=== Football League Cup ===
10 August 2010 First round	Yeovil Town	0–1	Crystal Palace	Yeovil
19:45		(Report)	Lee 90+1'	Stadium: Huish Park; Attendance: 3,720; Referee: Phil Gibbs

24 August 2010 Second round	Portsmouth	1–1 (4–3 p)	Crystal Palace	Portsmouth
19:45	Nugent 57'	(Report)	Sonko 81' (o.g.); Zaha (red card) 86'	Stadium: Fratton Park; Attendance: 8,412; Referee: David Phillips
	Penalties
	Brown (penalty scored); Wilson (penalty scored); Smith (penalty missed); Pack (penalty scored); Çiftçi (penalty missed); Dickinson (penalty missed); Hughes (penalty scored)		(penalty missed) Djilali; (penalty scored) Cadogan; (penalty missed) Obika; (penalty scored) McCarthy; (penalty scored) Garvan; (penalty missed) Clyne; (penalty missed) Barrett

=== FA Cup ===
8 January 2011 Third round	Coventry City	2–1	Crystal Palace	Coventry
15:00	Eastwood 15'; Baker 17'	(Report)	Danns 81'	Stadium: Ricoh Arena; Attendance: 8,162; Referee: Craig Pawson

== End-of-season awards ==
Award	Winner
Crystal Palace F.C. Player of the Year	Nathaniel Clyne
Crystal Palace F.C. Young Player of the Year	Wilfried Zaha
Vice Presidents' Player of the Year	Neil Danns
Vice Presidents' Young Player of the Year	Wilfried Zaha
Scholar Player of the Year	Wilfried Zaha
Academy Player of the Year	Ryan Inniss
Crystal Palace F.C. Goal of the Season	Darren Ambrose v Sheffield United (19–02–11)
Special Achievement Award	Malcolm Allison
