= Darren Ambrose =

English footballer (born 1984)

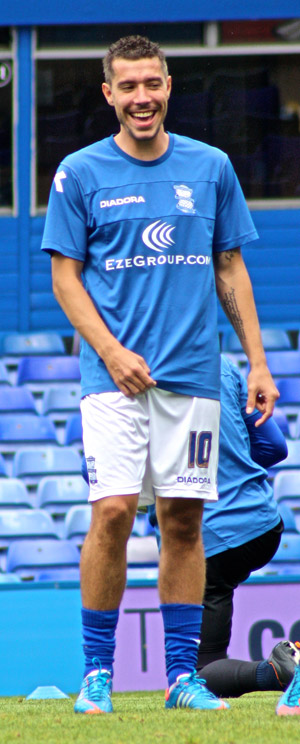
- Ambrose warming up for Birmingham City in 2012

Personal information
- Full name: Darren Paul Francis Ambrose
- Date of birth: 29 February 1984 (age 42)
- Place of birth: Harlow, England
- Height: 1.83 m (6 ft 0 in)
- Position: Midfielder

Youth career
- 1995–2001: Ipswich Town

Senior career*
Years	Team	Apps	(Gls)
2001–2003	Ipswich Town	30	(8)
2003–2005	Newcastle United	37	(5)
2005–2009	Charlton Athletic	112	(13)
2008–2009	→ Ipswich Town (loan)	9	(0)
2009–2012	Crystal Palace	110	(29)
2012–2014	Birmingham City	7	(0)
2014	→ Apollon Smyrnis (loan)	11	(6)
2014–2015	Ipswich Town	6	(0)
2015–2016	Colchester United	25	(4)
Total		347	(65)

International career
2005	England U20	4	(1)
2003–2006	England U21	10	(2)
- * Club domestic league appearances and goals

Darren Paul Francis Ambrose (born 29 February 1984) is an English retired professional footballer who played as a midfielder.

Ambrose began his career with Ipswich Town when he joined the club's Academy at the age of eleven. He broke through to the first-team in April 2002 in a 2–0 Premiership defeat to Arsenal. After establishing himself as a regular during the 2002–03 season, Ambrose was sold to Newcastle United for £1 million. He made over 50 appearances for Newcastle before joining Charlton Athletic in 2005 for £1.5 million. A four-year stay at The Valley saw Ambrose make over 125 appearances, while he also spent time away on loan at his former club Ipswich in the latter stages of his spell with the Addicks. He joined Crystal Palace on a free transfer ahead of the 2009–10 season, making 110 league appearances in three seasons. He signed for Birmingham City for a £250,000 fee in 2012, spending two seasons with the Championship club, but failed to establish himself in the first-team. He was loaned to Greek Super League side Apollon Smyrnis in January 2014, where he scored six goals in eleven outings. Ambrose was released by Birmingham in the summer of 2014, before he rejoined Ipswich on a permanent basis following a trial. He made just eight appearances for his boyhood club before being released the following summer. Ambrose then signed a one-year contract with League One club Colchester United in August 2015.

Ambrose has represented England at under-20 and under-21 level, scoring two goals in ten appearances between 2003 and 2006 for the under-21s, and scoring one goal in four games for the under-20s at the 2005 Toulon Tournament.

== Club career ==
=== Ipswich Town ===
Born in Harlow, Ambrose joined the Academy at Ipswich Town at the age of eleven, where he progressed through the club's Centre of Excellence before joining the Academy full-time in the summer of 2000. He broke into the reserve team during the 2000–01 season after helping the under-17 team to the league title. He made his first-team debut on 21 April 2002 when manager George Burley brought him on for the final five minutes of Ipswich's 2–0 defeat to Arsenal at Highbury, replacing Martijn Reuser.

Ipswich were relegated from the Premiership the same season, but this allowed Ambrose a place in the starting line-up for their opening First Division fixture of the 2002–03 season against Walsall on 10 August 2002. He scored on what was his first start for the club with the opening goal after 37 minutes. He scored again as Ipswich thrashed Leicester City 6–1 at Portman Road on 18 August, before scoring his third in five games in their 8–1 UEFA Cup win against Avenir Beggen on 29 August.

After making 37 appearances across the season and scoring eleven goals, Ambrose was sold to Newcastle United on 24 March 2003. With Ipswich in financial difficulty after falling into administration, the club were forced to sell Ambrose outside of the transfer window for a fee in the region of £1 million. Ambrose would later say that he "did not want to go" when he was sold to Newcastle, and that he was "sad to leave" Ipswich.

=== Newcastle United ===
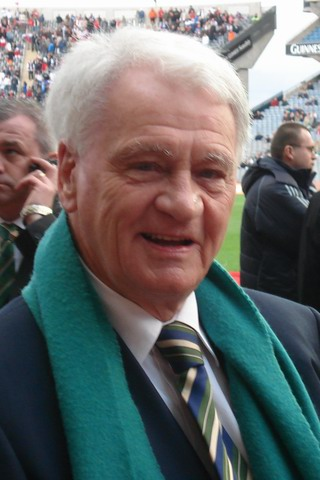
Bobby Robson signed Ambrose for Newcastle from Ipswich in March 2003.

After signing for Newcastle United on 24 March 2003, Ambrose had to wait until the final game of the season to make his debut for the first-team. Replacing Nolberto Solano in the 76th minute, Ambrose helped his side to a 2–2 draw against relegated West Bromwich Albion on 11 May 2003.

Ambrose made a scoring start to the 2003–04 season with the last goal in the Magpies 5–0 UEFA Cup first round win against NAC Breda on 24 September 2003. He scored his first Premiership goal away to Leicester City on Boxing Day with a last gasp equaliser to earn a 1–1 draw for his side, five minutes after being introduced as a substitute. He made his first start for the club after 18 first-team appearances on 31 January 2004 in Newcastle's 1–1 draw with Birmingham City at St Andrew's. He was replaced by Craig Bellamy after 75 minutes of play. He scored once more during the season when he sealed a late point away at Southampton on 12 May during a 3–3 draw. Ambrose made 37 appearances in all competitions over the course of the season, scoring three times.

With Bobby Robson sacked by Newcastle at the end of August 2004, Ambrose found first-team opportunities limited during the early stages of the season. Under new manager Graeme Souness, Ambrose made his first appearance of the season in Newcastle's 5–1 UEFA Cup win against Bnei Sakhnin in Israel on 30 September 2004, replacing Laurent Robert on 62 minutes. He scored his fourth Newcastle goal on 31 October during a 2–1 defeat to Bolton Wanderers. After making 10 appearances until 9 January 2005, Ambrose was out of action for three months, but made a return on 10 April in Newcastle's 1–0 defeat to Tottenham Hotspur at White Hart Lane. He then appeared in all of Newcastle's remaining Premiership games until the end of the season and scored two goals in the process; the opener against Manchester United in an eventual 2–1 defeat at Old Trafford on 24 April, and another opening goal in a 3–1 away win at Fulham on 4 May.

=== Charlton Athletic ===
After finding first-team chances hard to come by, Ambrose joined Charlton Athletic for an undisclosed fee on 8 July 2005 after Charlton had "made an offer that matches our valuation of the player" according to Newcastle chairman Freddy Shepherd. He signed a four-year contract with the London club, for an estimated fee of £1.5 million.

Ambrose made his Charlton debut on 13 August 2005 when they defeated Sunderland 3–1 at the Stadium of Light. However, despite the win, Ambrose was sent off after 55 minutes for a lunge on Sunderland defender Stephen Wright. He scored his first goal for the club in only his third game on 22 October with an equalising goal during a 2–1 win at Portsmouth. He scored three further goals over the course of the season, going on to make 33 appearances.

In his second season with the club, he made 30 appearances and scored three goals, but the club were relegated from the Premiership in 19th position. Ambrose remained with the club in the Championship, making 42 appearances and scored nine goals, including braces against his boyhood club Ipswich Town on 8 December 2007 and two in two minutes in a 5–3 defeat to Blackpool on 23 February 2008.

Ambrose missed the beginning of the 2008–09 season after undergoing a hip operation. He made eleven appearances in the early stages of the season, but was made available for loan in order to bring in other reinforcements with the club in financial difficulty.

==== Ipswich Town loan ====
Ambrose rejoined Ipswich Town on 11 November 2008 on loan until 2 January 2009 after being made available for loan by Charlton manager Alan Pardew. He made his second debut for Ipswich on 15 November as a second-half substitute during a 1–0 defeat to Doncaster Rovers. After nine games with the Blues, Ambrose returned to action with his parent club.

==== Return to Charlton ====
On his return to Charlton, Ambrose made a further twelve appearances to the end of the season. This included the only goal of the game in the FA Cup third round as the Addicks beat Norwich City. The club were relegated to League One at the end of the season, and with his contract expiring in the summer, Charlton opted not to offer Ambrose a contract extension. He had made 128 appearances for Charlton in all competitions and scored 17 goals during his four-year stay.

=== Crystal Palace ===
With his contract set to expire on 1 July 2009, Ambrose agreed to join Charlton's south London rivals Crystal Palace on a free transfer, signing a two-year deal.

Ambrose made his club debut in a 1–1 draw with Plymouth Argyle at Selhurst Park on 8 August. He scored his first goals three days later in a 2–1 League Cup win over Torquay United, before netting another brace against Ipswich in a 3–1 away win on 18 August. After scoring twelve goals in 20 games, Ambrose was named as the Championship Player of the Month for November 2009 by The Football League, having found the back of the net in each of the four league fixtures he played during the month. He scored a crucial goal in the final game of the season against Sheffield Wednesday during the sides 2–2 draw. With Wednesday requiring a win to stay up, Palace needed to draw or win to guarantee safety, having been deducted ten points for entering administration. With the scores at 1–1, Ambrose struck in the 63rd minute for his 20th goal of the season to hand Palace a two-goal buffer. Wednesday responded but Palace held on for a 2–2 draw and survived, while Wednesday were relegated. Ambrose made 53 appearances during the season.

With speculation surrounding his future at the club after being linked to Queens Park Rangers, Ambrose signed a new three-year contract with Crystal Palace on 26 July 2010 after it was announced that his former manager at Ipswich George Burley had been brought into the club. Ambrose opened his goalscoring account in the first game of the 2010–11 season, scoring Palace's second goal in a 3–2 win over Leicester City. However, under new Burley, Ambrose found his chances limited, making just eleven appearances between the start of the season and Burley's dismissal on New Year's Day 2011. He had scored three goals in this time. Under new manager Dougie Freedman, he returned to the starting line-up, making a further 18 appearances and scoring three goals.

Darren Ambrose's career at Crystal Palace was most famous for his League Cup Quarter Final goal against Manchester United on 30 November 2011. The long-range goal was the first in an eventual 2–1 win by Crystal Palace over Manchester United, and was said by Gary Neville to be the best goal scored at Old Trafford.

=== Birmingham City ===
Birmingham City signed Ambrose for an undisclosed fee in the region of £250,000 on a two-year contract on 13 July 2012. He scored on his competitive debut for the club in their 5–1 League Cup win over Barnet on 14 August, and kept his place for the opening match of the 2012–13 league season in a 1–1 draw with his former club Charlton. Ambrose labelled his contribution to a poor team display during a 5–0 home defeat by Barnsley in September as "the worst performance of my career". After assisting five goals in five games, a series of niggling injuries, including a sickness bug and a problematic knee, kept Ambrose out of contention. Following the defeat to Barnsley, he made just two further appearances all season.

After a disrupted first season with Birmingham, Ambrose looked to push on in his second season, however, just two appearances in the first team followed, before being allowed to leave on loan for Greek Super League club Apollon Smyrnis, managed by Lawrie Sanchez.

==== Apollon Smyrnis loan ====
Ambrose joined Athens-based Super league club Apollon Smyrnis on loan until the end of the season on 14 January 2014. He made his debut on 19 January in Apollon's 2–1 home defeat by Asteras Tripolis. He scored his first goal for the club on 5 February in their 1–1 draw at Levadiakos with a late equaliser. He also netted in 2–1 defeats to Panetolikos and Panionios before scoring a brace in a 3–1 home win over Platanias on 9 March before rounding off his scoring in a 3–1 defeat by Panathinaikos on 22 March. He made a total of eleven appearances in Greece, scoring six times.

=== Return to Ipswich Town ===
Ambrose was released by Birmingham at the end of the 2013–14 season, after a successful loan spell at Apollon Smyrnis despite the side being relegated from the Greek Super League. He began training with League One club Colchester United in July 2014, including playing in a pre-season friendly against his former club Ipswich Town.

Ambrose began training with his former side Ipswich through August 2014 and featured twice for the club's under-21 side. On 11 September 2014, Ambrose signed a contract until January 2015 with the club, becoming one of five players to have had three or more spells at the club, joining John Wark, Tommy Miller, Richard Wright and Daryl Murphy. He made his third debut on 22 September as he helped Ipswich to a 2–1 win away at Wigan Athletic. He scored one goal during his stint with Ipswich, earning the club an FA Cup third round replay against Southampton after drawing 1–1 at St Mary's Stadium on 4 January 2015. Ambrose played just eight games for Ipswich across the 2014–15 season, and he remained with the club over the summer of 2015 with the intention of earning a new contract.

=== Colchester United ===
Having previously spent the 2014–15 pre-season on trial with Colchester United, Ambrose signed a one-year deal with the League One club on 6 August 2015. He made his debut for the club in their opening day 2–2 draw with Blackpool on 8 August, scoring Colchester's equaliser on 56 minutes before being substituted for Dion Sembie-Ferris after 82 minutes. He scored his second goal for the club on 24 October, putting his side 4–3 ahead in what would end up a 4–4 draw with Walsall at the Colchester Community Stadium. His performance in the match earned him a place in the Football League 'Team of the Week' after providing two assists in addition to his goal.

Ambrose helped Colchester achieve their first victory in 19 League One games on 1 March 2016 by scoring twice in a 2–1 victory against Bradford City at Valley Parade.

After making 26 appearances during the campaign, Ambrose was not offered a new contract at the end of the season as Colchester were relegated to League Two.

== International career ==
=== Under-20s ===
Ambrose made a goalscoring debut for the England under-20 side during the 2005 Toulon Tournament. He scored England's first goal during their 2–0 win against their Tunisian counterparts on 2 June 2005. He also appeared in a 3–0 defeat to South Korea on 6 June, a 5–4 penalty shoot-out defeat to France following a 0–0 stalemate on 8 June, and in a 1–1 draw with Mexico, which England won 3–2 on penalties on 10 June to finish third in the competition.

=== Under-21s ===
Ambrose made his England under-21 debut on 11 February 2003 when he replaced David Prutton during a 1–0 friendly defeat to Italy. He made his next appearance during another friendly on 2 June when he came on as a substitute for Bobby Zamora in England's 3–2 win against Serbia & Montenegro. He was again a substitute in England's 2–2 draw with Sweden on 30 March 2004 before starting his first under-21 game during a 1–0 defeat in Spain.

Ambrose played his first competitive England under-21 game on 29 March 2005 in England's 2006 European Under-21 Championship qualifier against Azerbaijan at the Riverside Stadium. England won the match 2–0. He scored his first goal for England at under-21 level following his appearances in the under-20 Toulon Tournament in June 2005 with the only goal of the game against Denmark on 16 August. He was again selected for the European Championship qualifies, featuring in England's 4–0 win over Wales at the Racecourse Ground. Ambrose scored his second goal in England's qualifying play-off match first-leg against France on 11 November, a game which finished 1–1. He also played in the 2–1 defeat in France four days later.

Ambrose made his final England appearance in the 2007 European Under-21 Championship qualifier against Moldova on 15 August 2006 at his former club Ipswich Town's home ground Portman Road. England drew the game 2–2.

== Personal life ==
After calling time on his playing career, Ambrose opened a barbershop in Ipswich in August 2016, while planning to work with the Ipswich Town Academy.

Since his retirement, Ambrose has worked on his podcast, "Not A Bad Effort with Darren Ambrose" and can be heard on Talksport.

After leaving football, Ambrose started a YouTube channel dedicated to Lego, in which he, his wife and their children construct film sets and football stadiums.

Darren is a Tottenham Hotspur supporter.

== Career statistics ==
Appearances and goals by club, season and competition
Club	Season	League			National cup		League cup		Other		Total	
Club	Season	Division	Apps	Goals	Apps	Goals	Apps	Goals	Apps	Goals	Apps	Goals
Ipswich Town	2001–02	Premier League	1	0	0	0	0	0	0	0	1	0
Ipswich Town	2002–03	First Division	29	8	2	1	2	1	4 (Note: Appearances in UEFA Cup)	1	37	11
Ipswich Town	Total		30	8	2	1	2	1	4	1	38	11
Newcastle United	2002–03	Premier League	1	0	—		—		—		1	0
Newcastle United	2003–04	Premier League	24	2	1	0	1	0	11	1	37	3
Newcastle United	2004–05	Premier League	12	3	1	0	1	0	4	0	18	3
Newcastle United	Total		37	5	2	0	2	0	15	1	56	6
Charlton Athletic	2005–06	Premier League	28	3	3	0	2	1	—		33	4
Charlton Athletic	2006–07	Premier League	26	3	1	0	3	0	—		30	3
Charlton Athletic	2007–08	Championship	37	7	2	1	3	1	—		42	9
Charlton Athletic	2008–09	Championship	21	0	2	1	0	0	—		23	1
Charlton Athletic	Total		112	13	8	2	8	2	—		128	17
Ipswich Town (loan)	2008–09	Championship	9	0	—		—		—		9	0
Crystal Palace	2009–10	Championship	46	15	5	3	2	2	—		53	20
Crystal Palace	2010–11	Championship	28	7	0	0	1	0	—		29	7
Crystal Palace	2011–12	Championship	36	7	0	0	6	3	—		42	10
Crystal Palace	Total		110	29	5	3	9	5	—		124	37
Birmingham City	2012–13	Championship	6	0	0	0	2	1	—		8	1
Birmingham City	2013–14	Championship	1	0	0	0	1	0	—		2	0
Birmingham City	Total		7	0	0	0	3	1	—		10	1
Apollon Smyrnis (loan)	2013–14	Super League Greece	11	6	—		—		—		11	6
Ipswich Town	2014–15	Championship	6	0	2	1	0	0	0	0	8	1
Colchester United	2015–16	League One	25	4	1	0	0	0	0	0	26	4
Career total			347	65	20	7	24	9	19	2	410	83

== Honours ==
Individual

- Football League Championship Player of the Month: November 2009
- Crystal Palace Goal of the Season: 2009–10, 2010–11, 2011–12
