= Nathaniel Clyne =

English footballer (born 1991)

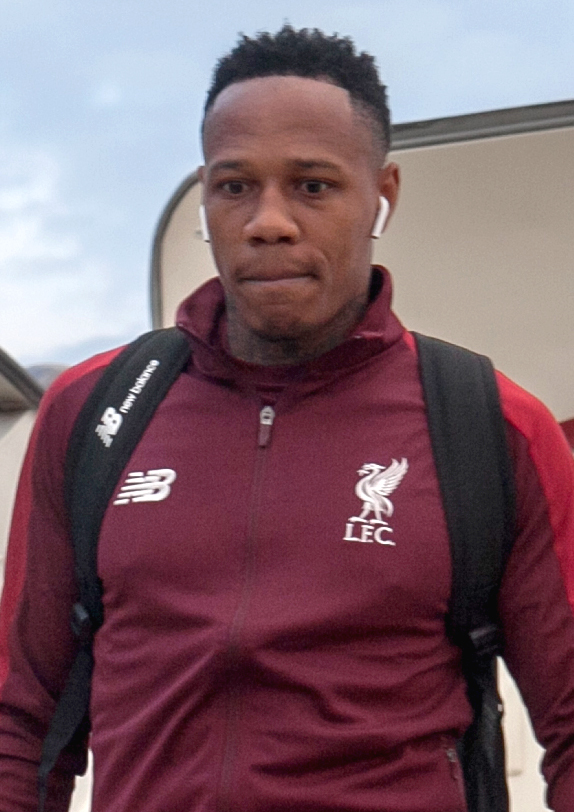
- Clyne with Liverpool in 2018

Personal information
- Full name: Nathaniel Edwin Clyne
- Date of birth: 5 April 1991 (age 35)
- Place of birth: Stockwell, England
- Height: 5 ft 9 in (1.75 m)
- Positions: Right-back; right wing-back; centre-back

Youth career
- Afewee Academy
- 1999–2008: Crystal Palace

Senior career*
Years	Team	Apps	(Gls)
2008–2012	Crystal Palace	122	(1)
2012–2015	Southampton	94	(3)
2015–2020	Liverpool	77	(1)
2019	→ Bournemouth (loan)	14	(0)
2020–2026	Crystal Palace	93	(0)

International career
2009–2010	England U19	9	(0)
2011–2013	England U21	8	(0)
2014–2016	England	14	(0)
- * Club domestic league appearances and goals as of 18:03, 24 May 2026 (UTC)

Nathaniel Edwin Clyne (born 5 April 1991) is an English professional footballer who plays as a right-back, right wing-back, or centre-back.

A Crystal Palace academy graduate, Clyne made his senior debut in 2008, playing regularly in four Championship seasons, being named Football League Young Player of the Year in 2010 and the club's Player of the Season in 2011 and making 137 appearances. In 2012, he was signed by Premier League side Southampton where he spent three seasons, making over 100 appearances and scored five goals in all competitions.

Clyne was signed by Liverpool in July 2015 for a fee of £12.5 million, starting as Liverpool lost the 2016 League Cup and Europa League finals. Initially an integral starter in the squad, he suffered persistent injury problems and lost his place to youngster Trent Alexander-Arnold before having a brief loan spell with Bournemouth. After making over 100 appearances for Liverpool, he rejoined boyhood club Crystal Palace in 2020, making a further 100 appearances, winning the FA Cup and Community Shield in 2025, and winning his final trophy with the club, the UEFA Conference League, in 2026.

Formerly an international at under-19 and under-21 level, Clyne made his senior international debut for England in November 2014. He was selected for UEFA Euro 2016 and made a total of 14 appearances for his country.

== Club career ==
=== Crystal Palace ===
Clyne was born in Stockwell, South London, and played for nearby Afewee Academy, before being spotted by Crystal Palace who signed him for their youth academy. He made his Palace debut for the first-team in a 3–0 Championship win against Barnsley at Selhurst Park on 18 October 2008. He signed a three-year professional contract with the club two days later, with the Palace manager at the time Neil Warnock stating that Clyne "has a bright future in the game". His first career goal came on 8 December 2009, when he opened the scoring in a 4–2 win at Reading in the seventh minute. In February 2010 he was offered a move to Premier League club Wolverhampton Wanderers, but rejected it without even entering talks with manager Mick McCarthy.

In the 2010–11 season, Clyne was the youngest player in the Football League to play every single match of that campaign, and won Crystal Palace's Player of the Year award.

=== Southampton ===
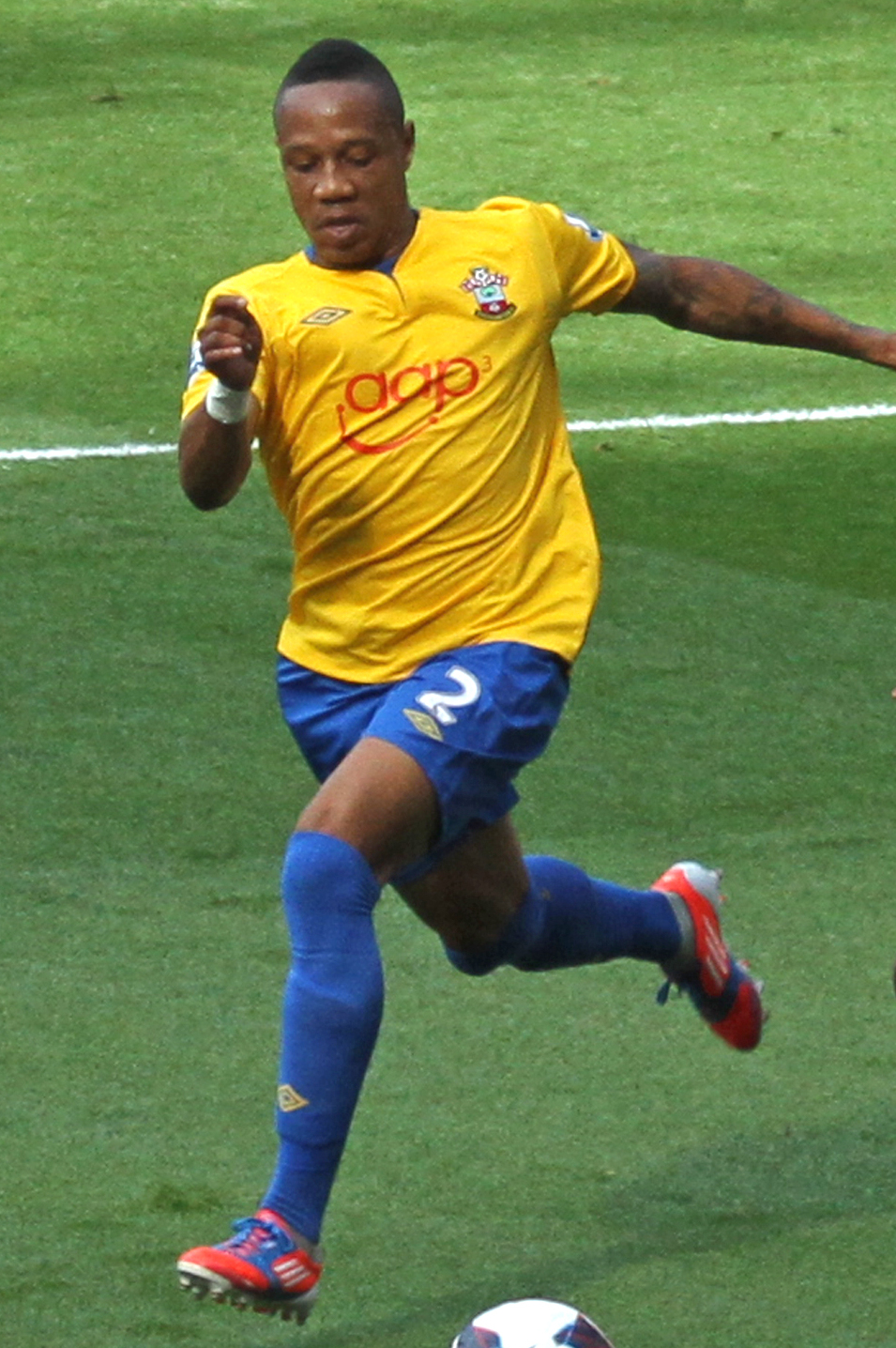
Clyne playing for Southampton in 2012

On 19 July 2012, Clyne signed a four-year deal with newly promoted Premier League club Southampton. He made his debut on 19 August, in a 3–2 defeat against Manchester City at the City of Manchester Stadium. His first match at St Mary's came six days later in a 0–2 defeat by Wigan Athletic. He scored his first goal for the club on 22 September, in a 4–1 win at home against Aston Villa, set up by Gastón Ramírez with England under-21 coach Stuart Pearce in attendance at St Mary's. His second goal for the club came in the FA Cup third round against Burnley on 4 January 2014, opening an eventual 4–3 home victory with a 25-yard strike past Tom Heaton.

Clyne scored in Southampton's first match of the 2014–15 season, a 2–1 defeat against Liverpool at Anfield on 17 August. He scored his second goal of the campaign on 23 September, with a long-range effort which gave Southampton a 2–1 victory at Arsenal in the League Cup third round. On 24 November, he finished Ryan Bertrand's 81st-minute cross to earn a 1–1 draw away to Aston Villa.

=== Liverpool ===
On 1 July 2015, Liverpool confirmed the signing of Clyne from Southampton for £12.5 million on a five-year contract, with his former club, Crystal Palace receiving a payment of £2.5M. Clyne made his debut in a Liverpool shirt against the True Thai Premier League All Stars in Bangkok on 14 July as part of the club's pre-season tour. He made his competitive debut on 9 August in a 1–0 away win against Stoke City in the first match of the 2015–16 Premier League season. On 28 October, Clyne scored his first Liverpool goal in a 1–0 League Cup fourth round victory over AFC Bournemouth; the team's first win under Jürgen Klopp. His first league goal came on 14 February 2016, in a 6–0 win away to Aston Villa.

In March 2016, in Liverpool's first European matches against rivals Manchester United, Clyne won a penalty that Daniel Sturridge converted in the first leg, and conceded a penalty scored by Anthony Martial in the second, as Liverpool won 3–1 on aggregate in the last 16 of the UEFA Europa League. On 18 May, he played the full 90 minutes in the final, a 3–1 loss to Sevilla in Basel.

Prior to the 2017–18 season, Clyne suffered a back injury expected to rule him out until February 2018. On 31 March 2018, having missed the entire campaign up to this point, he made his first appearance on the team sheet as an unused substitute in Liverpool's 2–1 league victory away to former club Crystal Palace. A week later on 7 April, he made his return, keeping a clean sheet in a 0–0 draw against Everton in a Merseyside derby.

Clyne joined fellow Premier League club Bournemouth on 4 January 2019 on loan for the remainder of the 2018–19 season. He made his debut the next day in a 3–1 FA Cup third round defeat at home to Brighton & Hove Albion.

On 20 July 2019, Clyne sustained an anterior cruciate ligament injury in a pre-season friendly against Borussia Dortmund. On 25 June 2020, after having made no appearances during the 2019–20 season due to continuing injury problems, Liverpool confirmed that his contract would not be renewed and Clyne would leave the club.

=== Return to Crystal Palace ===
After leaving Liverpool, Clyne trained with Crystal Palace in an attempt to regain fitness and was registered as a triallist in order to make appearances for the under-23 team. On 14 October 2020, he joined the club on a short-term contract. He made his debut ten days later in a 2–1 win at Fulham. On 25 January 2021, Clyne signed a contract extension to remain at the club until the end of the 2020–21 season.

On 6 August 2021, Clyne signed a new one-year contract with Crystal Palace and in June 2022, he signed a further contract extension keeping him at the club until 2023. In June 2023, Clyne signed a one-year extension to his contract, keeping him at the club until 2024. On 5 June 2024, the club said the player had signed another year-long extension. He was an unused substitute as Palace won the 2025 FA Cup final against Manchester City on 17 May 2025 for the club's, and Clyne's, first ever trophy. Following former captain and long-term serving player Joel Ward's departure that summer, Clyne became the last remaining Palace player to have represented the club in the EFL Championship.

On 27 May 2026, he won his final trophy with the club, the 2026 UEFA Conference League following a 1–0 win over Rayo Vallecano, and was an unused substitute for the match. In July, it was announced that Clyne had departed Palace following the expiration of his contract, ending his second stay with the club of six years.

== International career ==
Clyne was born in England and is of Grenadian descent through family.

On 2 October 2014, Clyne was named in the England squad for the UEFA Euro 2016 qualifiers against San Marino and Estonia later that month. He was an unused substitute in both matches. Clyne said "My aim, now, is to try to make myself first choice for Euro 2016. That's what I'm going to keep pushing for." On 15 November, he made his full international debut in a home qualifier against Slovenia, playing the full 90 minutes of a 3–1 victory. Clyne went on to establish himself as first-choice right-back for England, appearing in five of their last six qualifiers.

== Personal life ==
Clyne has many tattoos, including of London landmarks. These include the Houses of Parliament, the London Eye and Stockwell tube station, the nearest to his childhood home.

== Career statistics ==
=== Club ===
As of match played 24 May 2026

Appearances and goals by club, season and competition
Club	Season	League			FA Cup		League Cup		Other		Total	
Club	Season	Division	Apps	Goals	Apps	Goals	Apps	Goals	Apps	Goals	Apps	Goals
Crystal Palace	2008–09	Championship	26	0	3	0	0	0	—		29	0
Crystal Palace	2009–10	Championship	22	1	5	0	1	0	—		28	1
Crystal Palace	2010–11	Championship	46	0	1	0	2	0	—		49	0
Crystal Palace	2011–12	Championship	28	0	0	0	3	0	—		31	0
Crystal Palace	Total		122	1	9	0	6	0	—		137	1
Southampton	2012–13	Premier League	34	1	0	0	0	0	—		34	1
Southampton	2013–14	Premier League	25	0	3	1	1	0	—		29	1
Southampton	2014–15	Premier League	35	2	2	0	4	1	—		41	3
Southampton	Total		94	3	5	1	5	1	—		104	5
Liverpool	2015–16	Premier League	33	1	1	0	4	1	14 (Note: Appearances in UEFA Europa League)	0	52	2
Liverpool	2016–17	Premier League	37	0	0	0	4	0	—		41	0
Liverpool	2017–18	Premier League	3	0	0	0	0	0	2 (Note: Appearances in UEFA Champions League)	0	5	0
Liverpool	2018–19	Premier League	4	0	—		1	0	0	0	5	0
Liverpool	2019–20	Premier League	0	0	0	0	0	0	0	0	0	0
Liverpool	Total		77	1	1	0	9	1	16	0	103	2
Bournemouth (loan)	2018–19	Premier League	14	0	1	0	—		—		15	0
Crystal Palace	2020–21	Premier League	13	0	1	0	—		—		14	0
Crystal Palace	2021–22	Premier League	16	0	4	0	0	0	—		20	0
Crystal Palace	2022–23	Premier League	22	0	1	0	2	0	—		25	0
Crystal Palace	2023–24	Premier League	19	0	2	0	2	0	—		23	0
Crystal Palace	2024–25	Premier League	13	0	3	0	3	0	—		19	0
Crystal Palace	2025–26	Premier League	10	0	0	0	1	0	3 (Note: Appearances in UEFA Conference League)	0	14	0
Crystal Palace	Total		93	0	11	0	8	0	3	0	115	0
Career total			400	5	27	1	28	2	19	0	474	8

=== International ===
Appearances and goals by national team and year
National team	Year	Apps	Goals
England	2014	2	0
England	2015	7	0
England	2016	5	0
Total		14	0

== Honours ==
Liverpool

- Football League Cup runner-up: 2015–16
- UEFA Champions League runner-up: 2017–18
- UEFA Europa League runner-up: 2015–16

Crystal Palace

- FA Cup: 2024–25
- FA Community Shield: 2025
- UEFA Conference League: 2025–26

Individual

- PFA Team of the Year: 2011–12 Championship
- Crystal Palace Young Player of the Season: 2008–09, 2009–10
- Football League Young Player of the Year: 2010
- UEFA European Under-19 Championship Technical Selection: 2010
- Crystal Palace Player of the Season: 2010–11
- Football League Championship Player of the Month: October 2011
