= Neil Danns =

Guyana international footballer (born 1982)

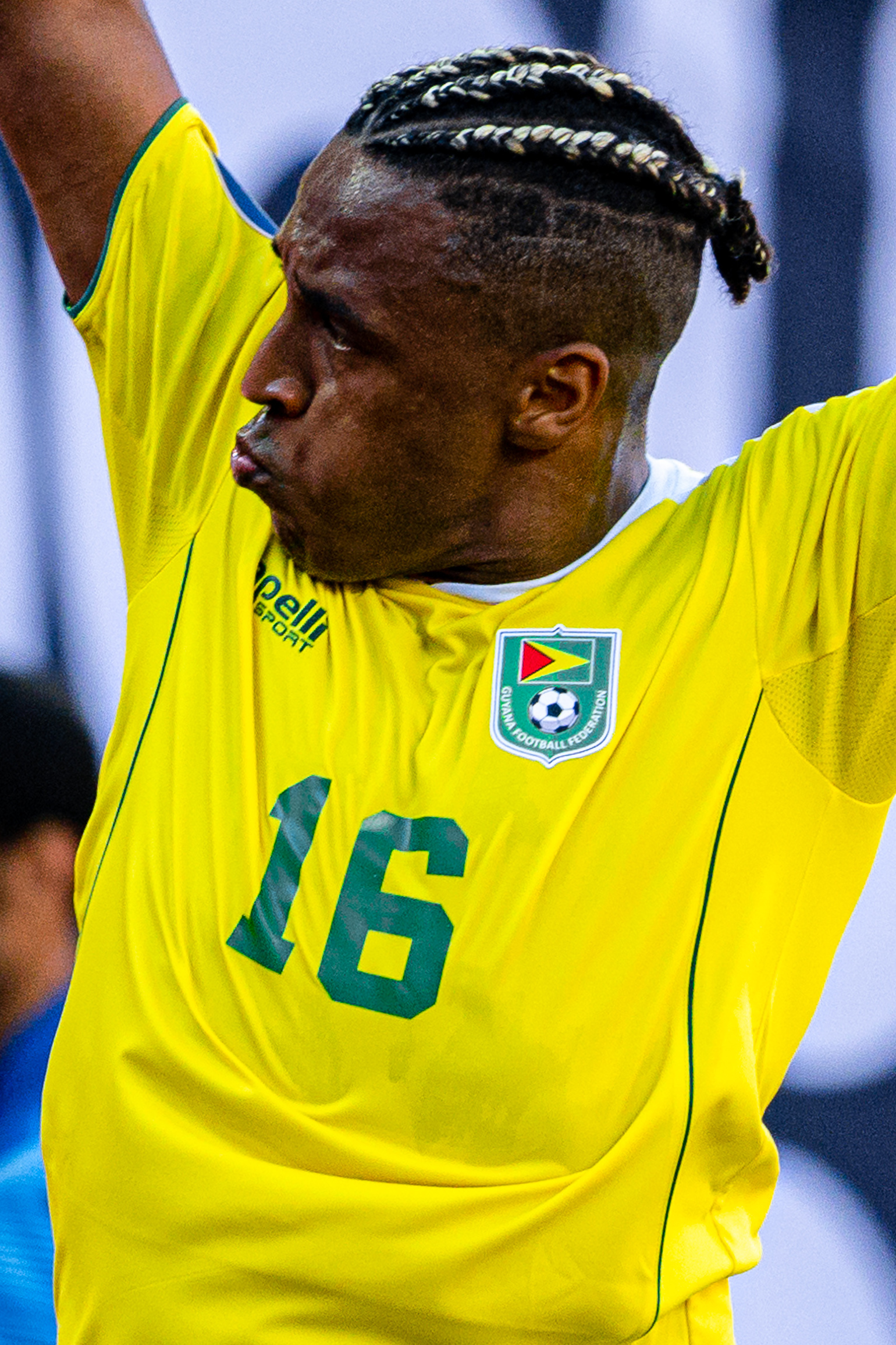
- Danns with Guyana at the 2019 CONCACAF Gold Cup

Personal information
- Full name: Neil Alexander Danns
- Date of birth: 23 November 1982 (age 43)
- Place of birth: Liverpool, England
- Height: 5 ft 9 in (1.75 m)
- Position: Midfielder

Youth career
- Liverpool
- –2000: Blackburn Rovers

Senior career*
Years	Team	Apps	(Gls)
2000–2004	Blackburn Rovers	3	(0)
2003	→ Blackpool (loan)	12	(2)
2004	→ Hartlepool United (loan)	11	(1)
2004	→ Colchester United (loan)	10	(3)
2004–2006	Colchester United	63	(16)
2006–2008	Birmingham City	31	(3)
2008–2011	Crystal Palace	103	(18)
2011–2014	Leicester City	30	(5)
2012–2013	→ Bristol City (loan)	9	(2)
2013	→ Huddersfield Town (loan)	17	(2)
2013–2014	→ Bolton Wanderers (loan)	33	(6)
2014–2016	Bolton Wanderers	73	(3)
2016–2019	Bury	77	(9)
2017	→ Blackpool (loan)	13	(2)
2019–2020	Tranmere Rovers	18	(0)
2020	Radcliffe	2	(0)
2020–2021	FC Halifax Town	5	(0)
2021	Connah's Quay Nomads	16	(1)
2021–2023	Macclesfield	58	(26)
Total		582	(99)

International career
2015–2023	Guyana	23	(11)

Managerial career
- 2022–2023: Macclesfield (interim)
- 2025–2026: Southport
- * Club domestic league appearances and goals

Neil Alexander Danns (born 23 November 1982) is a professional football coach and former player who was most recently the manager of National League North club Southport. Born in England, he played for the Guyana national team.

== Club career ==
=== Early career ===
Danns began his football career on schoolboy forms with Liverpool and spent two years at the Football Association's School of Excellence at Lilleshall. At 16, he chose to leave Liverpool, and signed for Blackburn Rovers as a trainee "in the face of fierce competition". He converted his penalty in the shootout by which Blackburn's youth team beat Liverpool's to reach the 2000–01 FA Youth Cup Final, and captained the team in the final, scoring as Blackburn beat Arsenal 3–1 in the second leg having lost the first leg 5–0.

=== First-team football: Blackburn Rovers and loans ===
Manager Graeme Souness gave Danns a "surprise" debut on 19 September 2002 in the starting eleven for the 1–1 draw with CSKA Sofia in the UEFA Cup; according to the Lancashire Evening Telegraph, he "didn't let anyone down with a lively performance". He made his first Premier League appearance three days later as a late substitute in a 1–0 win over Leeds United, and went on to make six appearances in all competitions in the 2002–03 season.

Ahead of the 2003–04 season, it was expected that Danns would be loaned out to gain first-team experience, and on 4 August, he joined Second Division club Blackpool for an initial one-month loan period, later extended to three months. He started the opening match of the Second Division season, a 5–0 defeat away to Queens Park Rangers. and was sent off in the next, receiving a second yellow card for timewasting near the end of a 3–2 win over Wycombe Wanderers. His first goal for the club, "[hitting] the roof of the net with a screamer from 40 yards (37 m)", began Blackpool's comeback from 2–0 down to win 3–2 at Oldham Athletic, He was sent off for a second time, again for two yellow cards, against Stockport County on 20 September, and scored his second Blackpool goal in his next league match, "rounding the keeper and striking a sweet left-foot shot into the far corner and between the two defenders on the line" to complete a 2–1 win over Notts County. Despite manager Steve McMahon and the players wanting him and fellow Blackburn loanee Jonathan Douglas to stay, both left Blackpool after their three months.

Danns "ran his heart out" for the 16 minutes of what proved to be his final appearance for Blackburn Rovers in a 4–3 loss against Bolton Wanderers on 10 January 2004. In March, he joined another Second Division club, Hartlepool United, on a one-month loan, later extended to the end of the season, and as he had with Blackpool, he made his debut in a heavy defeat to Queens Park Rangers. He established himself as a regular in the side, scored the winning goal away to Wrexham in April, and helped Hartlepool reach the play-offs. Danns played in both legs of the semi-final, in which they lost 3–2 on aggregate to Bristol City, having been 2–1 ahead with three minutes plus stoppage time to go.

=== Colchester United ===
In September 2004, Danns joined League One club Colchester United on loan as injury cover. He started the next match, a 3–1 league win over AFC Bournemouth on 11 September, and scored both goals in a 2–1 defeat of Port Vale on 4 October. The loan was extended for a second month, and Danns was a regular in the first team throughout his 13-match stay, during which he scored four times.

In December, disappointed at a perceived lack of opportunity at his parent club, Danns rejoined Colchester for a nominal fee, later reported as £15,000; his 18-month contract included a 30% sell-on clause. He resumed his place in the team and his goalscoring: his eight goals in this spell included both goals in a 2–1 win away to Stockport County in March 2005, and all 36 of his appearances for the season were in the starting eleven. During a match at Tranmere Rovers in February 2005, the hosts' match video commentator (Paul Rice) referred to Danns using racially offensive terminology; Rice was sacked.

Danns scored against Gillingham in the opening fixture of the 2005–06 season, but his team lost 2–1. He missed most of September with an abdominal injury, and took time to return to full fitness, but a run of goals in January, including two against Derby County to take his side through to the FA Cup fifth round, sparked interest from higher-level teams. However, Danns claimed that the progress Colchester were making allowed him to develop without needing to leave – 13 years later, he expressed his gratitude to the club for giving him the opportunity to shine – and that facing Chelsea in a televised FA Cup-tie "could be the start of another big opportunity". He "kept Colchester ticking" as they came close to earning a replay, and played a major part in his team's promotion to the second tier of English football for the first time in their history. His performances were recognised with a place in the PFA League One Team of the Year.

=== Birmingham City ===
On 19 June 2006, Danns signed a three-year contract with Birmingham City, newly relegated from the Premier League. The fee was an initial £500,000 with the potential to rise to £850,000. He admitted that he "had a great time at Colchester but when a club the size of Birmingham come in for you, it's hard to say no." He started Birmingham's opening fixture – against Colchester – and was involved in the first goal of a 2–1 win. In the first half of the season he was a regular on the pitch, either starting or as a used substitute, and scored three times. He set up a goal for Sebastian Larsson's equaliser against Newcastle United that took the third-round FA Cup-tie to a replay at St James's Park, which Birmingham won 5–1. In the second half of the campaign, he was used increasingly little in league matches, making only one start and five substitute appearances after the turn of the year; bids from League One club Nottingham Forest to take him either permanently or on loan were rejected. He came back into the squad in early April, but his season ended after being sent off for his part in a mass brawl at the end of Birmingham's defeat at Barnsley; he served a three-match ban and was not selected thereafter as Birmingham won four of the last five matches to confirm their promotion to the Premier League as runners-up.

Danns was determined to establish himself at Birmingham in the 2007–08 season, tried to take consolation from other players who had returned to the squad after lengthy periods out of it, and worked hard on the defensive aspect of the midfield position, but to no avail. He made two substitute appearances in the Premier League and two League Cup starts under manager Steve Bruce and none at all under his successor Alex McLeish, who told him that he should look elsewhere for first-team football.

=== Crystal Palace ===
Danns signed a three-and-a-half-year contract with Championship club Crystal Palace on 22 January 2008 for a fee of £600,000, rising to £850,000 conditional on the club's promotion to the Premier League. He made his debut as a 64th-minute substitute in a draw with Southampton on 4 February, and made two starts that month before a groin injury that needed two operations kept him out until 4 October. He returned as a half-time substitute against Nottingham Forest and was involved in Shefki Kuqi's late winning goal. The comeback was short-lived: after two more matches, an ankle injury kept him out for another couple of months, and it took a considerable time to return to full fitness. He finished the season with 23 appearances in all competitions and three goals.

Danns began the 2009–10 season in the starting eleven and largely remained in it. He created goals for others, scored a couple himself, and became increasingly influential as manager Neil Warnock set up the team to play in a style that suited his strengths. Crystal Palace entered administration during the January 2010 transfer window, and the consequent ten-point deduction left the team in danger of relegation. The administrators accepted a bid from Southampton for Danns, but the player rejected the move. Warnock challenged him to "step up and take on the goalscoring duties" from the departed Victor Moses, and he complied, with both goals in a 2–0 win over Peterborough United, a late winner against Scunthorpe United, and two more goals later in the season that took his league tally to eight. However, in the penultimate match of the season, a 1–1 draw with West Bromwich Albion, Danns was sent off for headbutting Graham Dorrans, so was suspended for the visit to Sheffield Wednesday from which Palace needed a point to survive at their hosts' expense. The match was drawn, so Wednesday were relegated. Danns was nominated for Palace's Player of the Year award – according to the citation, "his work rate and skill were major reasons Palace stayed up" – but lost out to goalkeeper Julián Speroni.

Having served his suspension, Danns scored a late consolation goal against Ipswich Town, and converted a penalty as well as setting up the goal that completed James Vaughan's hat-trick against Portsmouth in mid-September. He made a swift return from medial ligament damage suffered at the end of the month and soon returned to form. With his contract due to expire at the end of the season, speculation grew as to whether he would re-sign: an opinion piece in the local paper in the new year suggested that Danns was one of a small group of players who "aren't putting in 110%" and who should be a priority for new manager Dougie Freedman to get "playing from the same tune", and the player made a lengthy response via social media dismissing any suggestion that he was not giving his all for the club or that his recently acquired back problem was chronic and would make him fail a medical. He returned from injury to make a further 14 appearances, taking his total for the club to 114, in the last of which, having still not signed a new contract, he scored the only goal of the match against Leeds United that all but secured Palace's Championship survival. He was again shortlisted as Palace's Player of the Year, and won the Vice-presidents' Player of the Year award.

=== Leicester City and loans ===
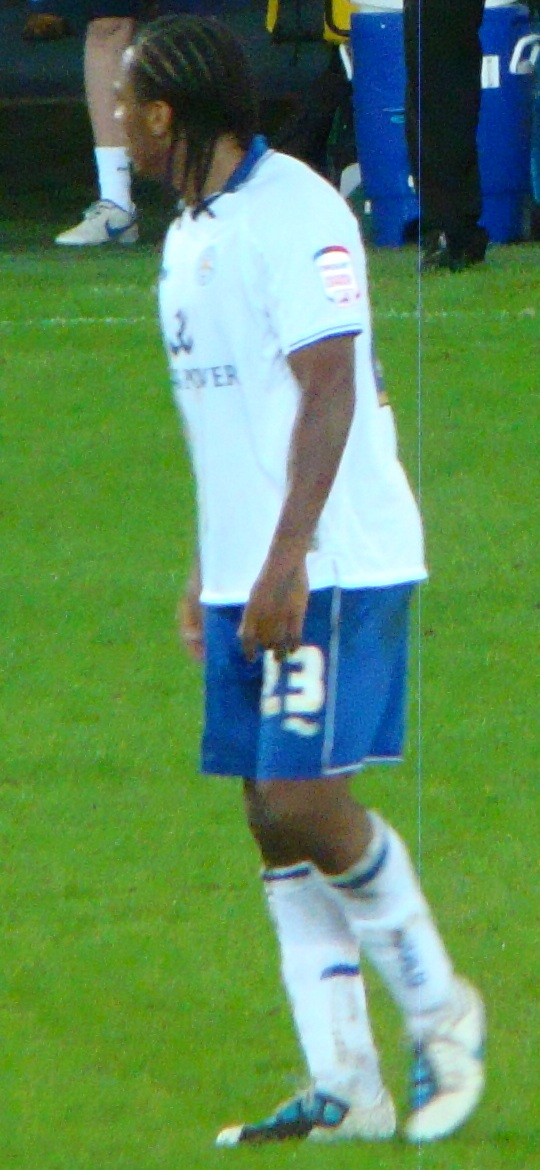
Danns in Leicester colours

Despite Scottish Premier League club Rangers believing themselves close to signing the player, Danns became Sven-Göran Eriksson's second signing for Championship club Leicester City when he agreed terms on a three-year deal to begin on 1 July after the expiry of his Palace contract. He started the opening game of the season, a 1–0 win over Coventry City, and scored his first goal as Leicester eliminated Bury from the League Cup. Danns was a regular inclusion in the matchday squad, both under Eriksson and his successor Nigel Pearson. He scored his first league goal for Leicester against Blackpool in a 2–0 home win in November; his next opened the scoring against his former club Crystal Palace, and he also took the free kick that led to Leicester's second goal in the 2–1 win. He added three more goals in February and March, and in the absence of Richie Wellens, captained the team against Pearson's former club, Hull City, on 24 March. He was sent off after 57 minutes for a "reckless challenge" on Hull's Paul McKenna, and was not selected again for the rest of the season.

At the start of the 2012–13 season, Danns played for 14 minutes in the Championship and made two League Cup appearances, but those were his last before joining Bristol City on 14 November on a month's loan. He made his debut against his former club Blackpool three days later, and in the second match, he set up a goal for Stephen Pearson that helped City end their 11-match winless run with a 3–1 victory at Middlesbrough. His loan was extended for a second month, and he contributed two goals from nine matches before returning to Leicester. Bristol City manager Derek McInnes was keen to extend Danns' stay further, either as another loan or on a permanent basis, but instead he joined another Championship club, Huddersfield Town, on loan until the end of the season.

On his debut, he "certainly put in a shift, first on the right hand side of midfield, then after the departure of [Oliver] Norwood, who started reasonably but lost his way, in the centre", in a draw at home to Birmingham City, He was a regular in the starting eleven as Huddersfield avoided relegation back to League One, with 17 league appearances and 2 goals, the first in a 2–1 West Yorkshire derby defeat of Leeds United and the second in a draw with Peterborough, although a toe injury kept him out of the last three fixtures.

In January 2013, Danns had dismissed suggestions of a disagreement with Nigel Pearson, and professed himself mystified by his exclusion from consideration at Leicester. At the start of the 2013–14 season, Pearson pointed out how fortunate Leicester were to "have quite a lot of quality in terms of our central midfield options", and that Danns would benefit from regular first-team football elsewhere.

=== Bolton Wanderers ===
On 26 September 2013, Danns signed on loan for Championship club Bolton Wanderers, managed by Dougie Freedman who had coached him at Crystal Palace. He made his first Wanderers appearance in a goalless draw away to Blackpool on 1 October, and his goal in the next match, away to Birmingham, gave his team their first league win of the season. He soon established himself in the team, and scored four goals from thirteen matches over the three-month spell. Freedman admired his industry, his ability to adapt his style of play to the match situation, and the way "he gets you off your seat and makes things happen", and the player was keen to make the move permanent if Leicester were willing.

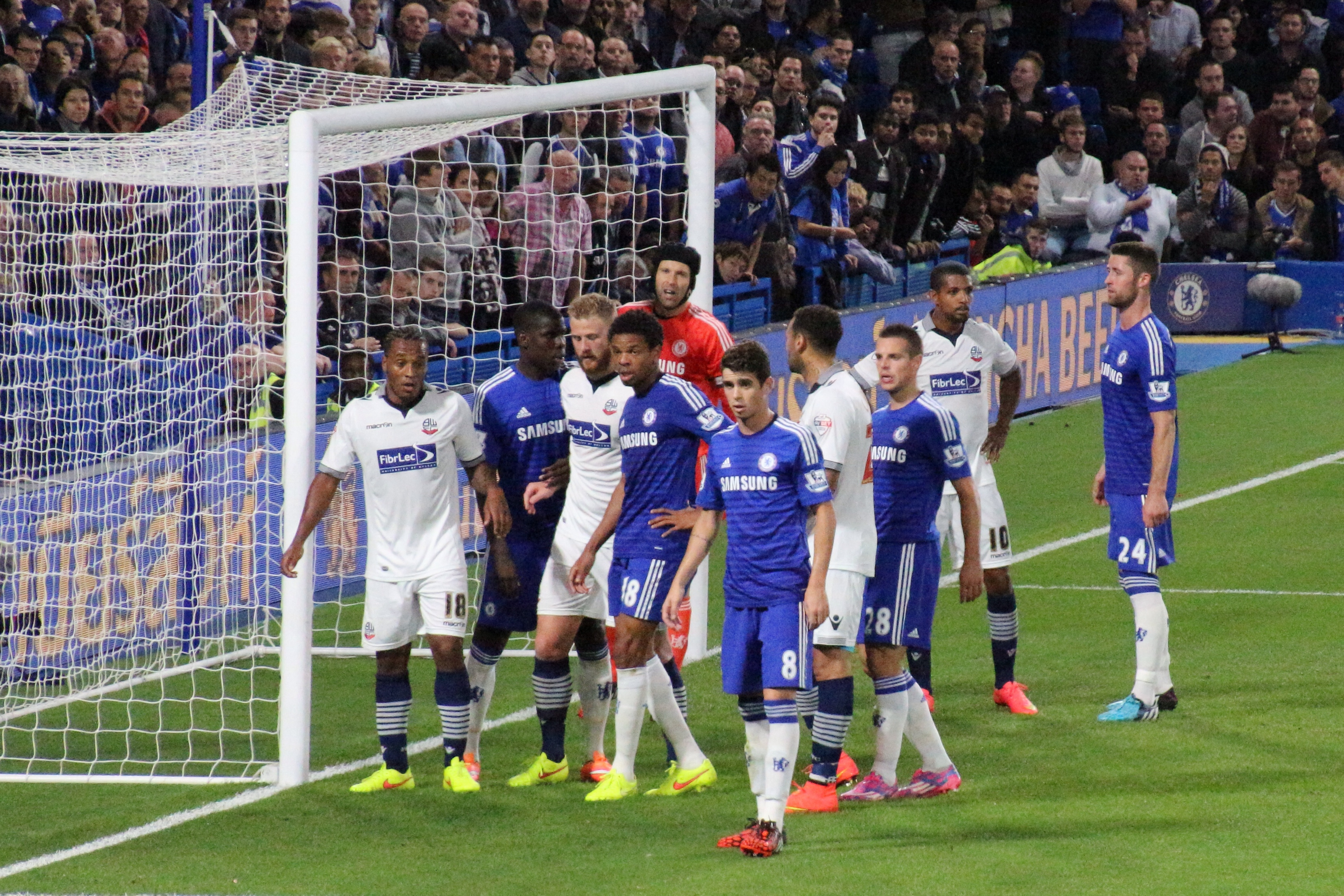
Danns (furthest left) playing for Bolton Wanderers against Chelsea in the League Cup in 2014

He rejoined Bolton on 3 January 2014 on loan until the end of the season. In February and March, he set up a goal in each of three consecutive wins. At the end of April, Danns signed a one-year contract with Bolton, to begin on 1 July after the expiry of his Leicester deal. Highlighting his work-rate, dynamism, and the positive attitude that set an example to the "younger, hungrier players" prioritised by the manager, the Bolton News suggested that "Freedman may have already made the most important signing of the summer".

Amid strong competition for a place in Freedman's preferred 4–2–3–1 formation, Danns started his 2014–15 season from the bench in a 3–0 opening-day loss to Watford. After Mark Davies's stoppage-time penalty kept Bolton in the League Cup first-round match against Bury of League Two, Danns scored twice in extra time to take his side through. He started the next Championship match, and remained in the starting eleven for most of the season. Playing on the right of a diamond formation, Danns scored in new manager Neil Lennon's first home match, a 3–1 win against Brentford on 25 October, before Lennon reverted to the system used by Freedman but with more license given to attack-minded players. In January 2015, Lennon described Danns and Darren Pratley as "pivotal" in the way his team was set up to play. but injury to the latter would adversely affect Danns' form.

At the end of January, Danns signed a one-year contract extension. Having captained the team in the FA Cup third round, he was sent off in the fourth before Bolton let slip a one-goal lead and went out to Liverpool. Soon afterwards, he received his tenth yellow card of the season and with it a two-match ban. In April, Danns and Barry Bannan were "suspended indefinitely" and fined two weeks' wages for drunken behaviour at the club's hotel; after apologising to all concerned, they missed just one match before Lennon recalled them. Danns finished the season with 47 appearances in all competitions.

Danns was considered as stand-in captain after incumbent Pratley was injured, but was not chosen. He scored his first goal of the season on 26 September 2015 in a 2–2 draw with Brighton & Hove Albion during which Jamie Murphy was sent off for fouling him. Accusations of diving prompted Danns to tweet a picture of the damage caused. He played regularly in the first half of the season but in the second, was used off the bench and often out of position. He did not start a league match in 2016 until 9 April, well after Lennon had left the club, in a defeat to Derby County that confirmed Bolton's relegation. Danns was released when his contract expired, having made 81 appearances in his permanent spell.

=== Bury and loan ===
After a trial, Danns signed a two–year contract with League One club Bury on 21 July 2016. He scored in the opening game of the season, a 2–0 win over Charlton Athletic, but ten days later injured a foot and was out for a month. He scored his first Bury goal on 18 October from the penalty spot in a 2–1 loss at home to AFC Wimbledon. He was sent off against Bristol Rovers in December for an off-the-ball incident, so served a three-match ban, and spent the second half of the season on loan to League Two club Blackpool.

Danns made his Blackpool debut on 4 February 2017 in a 1–1 draw with Colchester United, but suffered the first hamstring injury of his career the following week and was out for six matches. He played regularly for the rest of the season, and scored in the final match of the regular season, a 3–1 win against Leyton Orient that confirmed Blackpool's play-off place. Danns started in both legs of the semi-final and in the final as Blackpool beat Exeter City to gain promotion to League One.

Ahead of the 2017–18 season, manager Lee Clark told Danns that he could not be guaranteed game time and was free to leave. He was not initially given a squad number and had to train away from the senior squad, but remained keen to be part of Bury's campaign. Despite starting in the EFL Trophy and making three appearances (one start) in the league in September, it was not until Clark was sacked and Ryan Lowe took over as caretaker that Danns returned to the side. Against Gillingham on 11 November, he scored his first Bury goal for a year, but a hamstring injury sustained a week later was to keep him out for the rest of 2017. His exclusion had made him contemplate retirement, but Lowe made him captain and his enthusiasm returned. He scored three goals in February and March, but Bury's return to League Two was confirmed with four matches still to go. Danns signed a one-year contract extension at the end of the season.

Danns retained the captaincy for the 2018–19 season. He scored his first goals on 3 November in a 4–1 win over Macclesfield Town, "smashing home into the top-right corner from the edge of the box" for his second. Lowe said afterwards how pleased he was that Danns' hard work had been rewarded. He found himself in and out of the first team because of injury and his international commitments with Guyana, but still ended up with 34 league appearances (28 starts) as Bury gained promotion back to League One despite the financial turmoil surrounding the club, a winding-up petition pending and players and staff being paid late or not at all.

By the time Danns returned from international duty, Bury's financial position had worsened, and after six fixtures were suspended by the EFL pending credible proof of the club's viability, it was expelled from the league on 27 August 2019. Interviewed on radio station Talksport, Danns was highly critical of the role of the owner, who in his view had "literally destroyed lives" by his failure to progress the club in a proper manner.

=== Tranmere Rovers ===
Danns became a free agent after Bury's expulsion from the league, and on 19 September he signed for League One club Tranmere Rovers until the end of the season. He made 24 appearances in all competitions without scoring.

=== Wales/Non-league football ===
In October 2020, Danns signed for Northern Premier League Premier Division club Radcliffe.

In November 2020, Danns signed a short-term deal with National League club FC Halifax Town. He left the club on 12 January 2021 after appearing in five league games. At the beginning of March, Danns signed for Cymru Premier club Connah's Quay Nomads until the end of the season. He scored once from 16 appearances, the last of which was as a late substitute in the final-day win away to Penybont that confirmed Nomads as 2020–21 Cymru Premier champions.

On 9 September 2021, Danns signed for North West Counties Premier Division club Macclesfield on non-contract terms. On 13 December 2022, Danns was appointed interim manager at Macclesfield. During his time at the club, he helped them achieve back to back League Titles/Promotions with Macclesfield going from the 9th tier to the 7th tier.

== Coaching career ==
After spending half a season as interim player–manager at Macclesfield during the 2022–23 season, in which he won the Northern Premier League Division One West, Danns left at the end of the season to become assistant manager at Tranmere Rovers.

Danns left Tranmere when he was appointed manager at National League North side Southport on 12 May 2025.

On 6 September 2026, Southport announced that Danns had decided to step aside from his role as manager.

== International career ==
Danns was called up by Guyana for friendlies against Grenada and Saint Lucia in March 2015. He qualifies for the team via his grandfather. He made his debut against Grenada on 29 March, setting up both goals in a 2–0 victory. After missing the first leg of the 2018 World Cup qualifier against Saint Vincent and the Grenadines because his Guyanese passport did not come through in time, Danns scored twice in the June 2015 second leg, which finished as a 4–4 draw, but his country lost out on away goals.

Danns scored in a 2–2 draw with Barbados in a 2019–20 CONCACAF Nations League qualifier, which doubled as a qualifying tournament for the CONCACAF Gold Cup. He captained the national side and scored their goal in a 2–1 defeat to French Guiana on 20 November that put them out of contention for Gold Cup qualification. However, CONCACAF awarded Guyana a 3–0 win against Barbados, who had fielded ineligible players, which meant that beating Belize in the final qualifier would be enough to see Guyana through to the Gold Cup for the first time in their history. Danns scored the opening goal from the penalty spot, and later missed a second penalty, as Guyana won 2–1.

Danns was named in Guyana's squad for the 2019 CONCACAF Gold Cup, played in all three group matches and scored all three of his country's goals. In the second match, he converted two penalties to score Guyana's first goals ever in Gold Cup. However, Guyana lost 4–2 to Panama and was eliminated from the tournament. In the third game, a 1–1 draw with Trinidad and Tobago, after "dribbling from the left corner of the 18-yard box, Danns cut inside and curled a right-footer off the underside of the crossbar near the top right corner", the third goal both for him and Guyana. He was named in the group stage Best XI. He remains Guyana's only goalscorer ever in Gold Cup.

On 28 March 2022, in a 5–0 win over Barbados in a friendly game, he netted a goal on penalty kick to become at 39 years and 4 months Guyana's oldest goalscorer ever, beating Charles Pollard record (Note: Pollard was 38 when he scored his last goal for Guyana). Two days later, on 30 March, in a 1-1 friendly draw with Trinidad and Tobago, he scored his 11th and last goal for Guyana.

In June 2023 Danns was named to Guyana's 23-man squad for the 2023 CONCACAF Gold Cup qualification tournament. On 18 June, in a 1–1 draw with Grenada during the first round, he became at 40 years and 6 months Guyana's oldest player ever, beating a record also set by Pollard at 39 years and 7 months. Guyana won the game 5–3 on penalties and qualified for the second round, which took place two days later, on 20 June. Guyana was defeated 2–0 by Guadeloupe, and this was Danns' 23th and last cap with Guyana.

== Personal life ==
Danns was born in Liverpool, the son of Neil and Karen Danns. Neil Sr. was a backing singer on the UK's entry in the 1987 Eurovision Song Contest as well as a European title-winning skateboarder. Danns grew up in Toxteth, a difficult neighbourhood, and credited his parents for maintaining discipline and keeping him from involvement in crime. He has three children; the eldest, Jayden, made his Premier League debut for Liverpool on 21 February 2024 in the 89th minute of a 4–1 win over Luton Town. His daughter Hayla represented the United Kingdom in Junior Eurovision Song Contest 2023 as a member of girlband Stand Uniqu3. She was also a finalist on series 7 of The Voice Kids under Pixie Lott.

In 2010, Danns took a video editing and production course at the London Academy of Media, Film and TV. He was reported to be about to release a single, but did not. His music interests and career were featured in BBC Sport's The Football League Show in February 2010. He is a regular user of X.

== Career statistics ==
=== Club ===
As of match played 22 April 2023

Appearances and goals by club, season and competition
Club	Season	League			National cup		League cup		Other		Total	
Club	Season	Division	Apps	Goals	Apps	Goals	Apps	Goals	Apps	Goals	Apps	Goals
Blackburn Rovers	2002–03	Premier League	2	0	1	0	2	0	1 (Note: Appearance(s) in UEFA Cup)	0	6	0
Blackburn Rovers	2003–04	Premier League	1	0	0	0	—		—		1	0
Blackburn Rovers	2004–05	Premier League	0	0	—		—		—		0	0
Blackburn Rovers	Total		3	0	1	0	2	0	1	0	7	0
Blackpool (loan)	2003–04	Second Division	12	2	—		2	0	1 (Note: Appearance(s) in Football League Trophy)	0	15	2
Hartlepool United (loan)	2003–04	Second Division	9	1	—		—		2 (Note: Appearances in Football League Second Division play-offs)	0	11	1
Colchester United	2004–05 (Note: Part of this season was spent on loan from Blackburn Rovers.)	League One	32	11	1	0	2	1	1	0	36	12
Colchester United	2005–06	League One	41	8	5	5	1	0	4	3	51	16
Colchester United	Total		73	19	6	5	3	1	5	3	87	28
Birmingham City	2006–07	Championship	29	3	3	0	3	0	—		35	3
Birmingham City	2007–08	Premier League	2	0	0	0	2	0	—		4	0
Birmingham City	Total		31	3	3	0	5	0	—		39	3
Crystal Palace	2007–08	Championship	4	0	—		—		0	0	4	0
Crystal Palace	2008–09	Championship	20	2	3	1	0	0	—		23	3
Crystal Palace	2009–10	Championship	42	8	5	1	2	0	—		49	9
Crystal Palace	2010–11 (Note: Soccerbase attributes Danns' goal against Leeds United on 25 April to another player.)	Championship	37	8	1	1	0	0	—		38	9
Crystal Palace	Total		103	18	9	3	2	0	0	0	114	21
Leicester City	2011–12	Championship	29	5	5	0	3	1	—		37	6
Leicester City	2012–13	Championship	1	0	0	0	2	0	—		3	0
Leicester City	2013–14	Championship	0	0	—		2	0	—		2	0
Leicester City	Total		30	5	5	0	7	1	—		42	6
Bristol City (loan)	2012–13	Championship	9	2	0	0	—		—		9	2
Huddersfield Town (loan)	2012–13	Championship	17	2	1	0	—		—		18	2
Bolton Wanderers (loan)	2013–14	Championship	33	6	2	0	—		—		35	6
Bolton Wanderers	2014–15	Championship	41	1	3	0	3	2	—		47	3
Bolton Wanderers	2015–16	Championship	32	2	1	0	1	0	—		34	2
Bolton Wanderers	Total		106	9	6	0	4	2	—		116	11
Bury	2016–17	League One	18	2	2	0	0	0	1 (Note: Appearance(s) in EFL Trophy)	0	21	2
Bury	2017–18	League One	25	5	1	0	0	0	2	0	28	5
Bury	2018–19	League Two	34	2	2	0	0	0	3	0	39	2
Bury	Total		77	9	5	0	0	0	6	0	88	9
Blackpool (loan)	2016–17	League Two	13	2	—		—		3 (Note: Appearances in League Two play-offs)	0	16	2
Tranmere Rovers	2019–20	League One	18	0	5	0	—		1	0	24	0
Radcliffe	2020–21	Northern Premier League; Premier Division	2	0	0	0	—		1 (Note: Appearance(s) in FA Trophy)	0	3	0
FC Halifax Town	2020–21	National League	5	0	—		—		0	0	5	0
Connah's Quay Nomads	2020–21	Cymru Premier	16	1	—		—		—		16	1
Macclesfield	2021–22	North West Counties League; Premier Division	31	21	—		—		2 (Note: One appearance in FA Vase, one appearance and one goal in NWCFL Challenge Cup)	1	33	22
Macclesfield	2022–23	Northern Premier League; Division One West	27	5	3	0	—		3 (Note: Three appearances and one goal in FA Trophy, one appearance in Cheshire Senior Cup)	1	33	6
Macclesfield	Total		58	26	3	0	—		5	2	66	28
Career total			582	99	44	8	25	4	25	5	676	116

=== International ===
As of match played 20 June 2023
Scores and results list Guyana's goal tally first, score column indicates score after each Danns goal.

List of international goals scored by Neil Danns
No.	Date	Venue	Opponent	Score	Result	Competition
1	14 June 2015	Providence Stadium, Providence, Guyana	Saint Vincent and the Grenadines	2–2	4–4	2018 FIFA World Cup qualification
2	14 June 2015	Providence Stadium, Providence, Guyana	Saint Vincent and the Grenadines	4–4	4–4	2018 FIFA World Cup qualification
3	22 March 2016	Providence Stadium, Providence, Guyana	Anguilla	4–0	7–0	2017 Caribbean Cup qualification
4	6 September 2018	Synthetic Track and Field Facility, Leonora, Guyana	Barbados	2–2	2–2	2019–20 CONCACAF Nations League qualifying
5	20 November 2018	Stade Municipal Dr. Edmard Lama, Cayenne, French Guiana	French Guiana	1–2	1–2	2019–20 CONCACAF Nations League qualifying
6	23 March 2019	Synthetic Track and Field Facility, Leonora, Guyana	Belize	1–0	2–1	2019–20 CONCACAF Nations League qualifying
7	22 June 2019	FirstEnergy Stadium, Cleveland, United States	Panama	1–1	2–4	2019 CONCACAF Gold Cup
8	22 June 2019	FirstEnergy Stadium, Cleveland, United States	Panama	2–4	2–4	2019 CONCACAF Gold Cup
9	26 June 2019	Children's Mercy Park, Kansas City, United States	Trinidad and Tobago	1–0	1–1	2019 CONCACAF Gold Cup
10	28 March 2022	Hasely Crawford Stadium, Port of Spain, Trinidad and Tobago	Barbados	4–0	5–0	Friendly game
11	30 March 2022	Hasely Crawford Stadium, Port of Spain, Trinidad and Tobago	Trinidad and Tobago	1–0	1–1	Friendly game

== Managerial statistics ==
As of match played 5 September 2026

Managerial record by team and tenure
Team	From	To	Record				
Team	From	To	P	W	D	L	Win %
Macclesfield	13 December 2022	5 May 2023	21	15	5	1	71.4
Southport	12 May 2025	6 September 2026	63	23	16	24	36.5
Total			84	38	21	25	45.2

== Honours ==
=== Player ===
Blackburn Rovers

- FA Youth Cup runner-up: 2000–01

Colchester United

- Football League One runner-up: 2005–06

Birmingham City

- Football League Championship runner-up: 2006–07

Blackpool

- EFL League Two play-offs: 2017

Bury

- EFL League Two runner-up: 2018–19

Connah's Quay Nomads

- Cymru Premier: 2020–21

Macclesfield

- North West Counties Football League Premier Division: 2021–22
- Northern Premier League Division One West: 2022–23

Individual

- PFA Team of the Year: 2005–06 League One

=== Manager ===
Macclesfield

- Northern Premier League Division One West: 2022–23

== See also ==
- List of Bolton Wanderers F.C. players (100+ matches)
- List of Crystal Palace F.C. players (100+ matches)
- List of footballers in England by number of league appearances (500+)
