= Ghassimu Sow =

English footballer (born 1995)

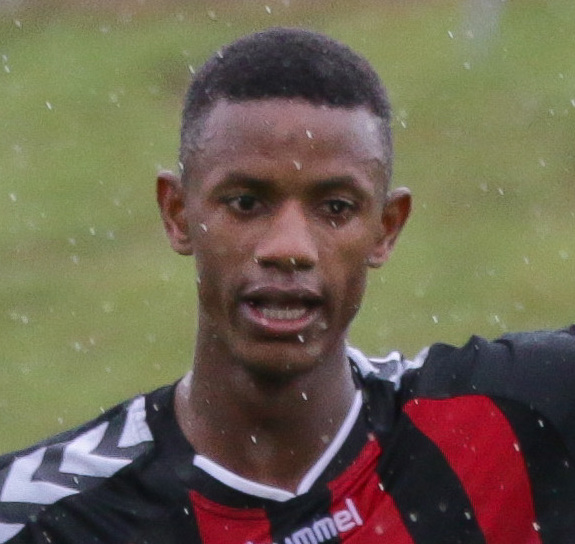
- Sow in 2017 with Lewes

Personal information
- Full name: Ghassimu Sow
- Date of birth: 10 April 1995 (age 31)
- Place of birth: Liberia
- Position: Midfielder

Team information
- Current team: Carshalton Athletic

Youth career
- Crystal Palace

Senior career*
Years	Team	Apps	(Gls)
2012–2015	Crystal Palace	0	(0)
2014	→ FC Honka (loan)	7	(0)
2015	→ Farnborough (loan)	6	(0)
2015–2016	St Albans City	13	(0)
2016	Dulwich Hamlet	8	(0)
2016–2018	Lewes		
2018–2019	Merstham		
2019–2022	Kingstonian		
2022–	Carshalton Athletic		

International career
- England U16
- * Club domestic league appearances and goals as of 10:59, 3 October 2022 (UTC)

Ghassimu Sow (born 10 April 1995) is a footballer who plays for Carshalton Athletic as a midfielder. Born in Liberia, he has represented England at youth level.

Sow began his career with Crystal Palace, spending loan spells with Finnish club FC Honka and English non-league club Farnborough.

== Early and personal life ==
Born in Liberia, Sow moved to England at the age of 8.

== Club career ==
Sow signed a three-year professional contract with Crystal Palace in April 2012. In May 2014 Sow joined Finnish side FC Honka on a three-month loan deal, where he made seven appearances in the Veikkausliiga. He signed a one-month loan deal with Conference South club Farnborough in January 2015. On 8 May 2015, it was announced that Sow would not be offered a new contract by Crystal Palace and would leave the club.

Sow signed for St Albans City in August 2015, before moving to Dulwich Hamlet in January 2016. After finishing the 2015–16 season with Dulwich, making 11 appearances in all competitions, the club announced that they were not offering Sow a new contract ahead of the 2016–17 season.

Sow joined Lewes in August 2016.

In July 2018, Sow joined Isthmian League Premier Division side Merstham. One year later, he joined Kingstonian. He combined his non-league career with roles at Crystal Palace as a player liaison officer and as head coach of their under-9 team. In June 2022 he moved to Carshalton Athletic.

== International career ==
Sow represented England at under-16 youth level.
