= 2007–08 Crystal Palace F.C. season =

English football club season

Crystal Palace
2007–08 season
- Chairman: Simon Jordan
- Manager: Peter Taylor (until 8 October); Neil Warnock (from 11 October)
- Stadium: Selhurst Park
- Championship: 5th (play-offs)
- FA Cup: Third round
- League Cup: First round
- Top goalscorer: League: Clinton Morrison (16); All: Clinton Morrison (16)
- Highest home attendance: 23,950 vs Burnley (4 May 2008)
- Lowest home attendance: 13,048 vs Preston North End (27 November 2007)
- Average home league attendance: 16,031
Home colours	Away colours

The 2007–08 season was Crystal Palace Football Club's third consecutive season in The Championship. Manager Peter Taylor was sacked on 8 October 2007 and replaced by former Sheffield United manager Neil Warnock on 11 October 2007.

== Statistics ==
=== Appearances ===
Last updated on 13 May 2008.

No.	Pos	Nat	Player	Total		Championship (including play-offs)		FA Cup		League Cup	
No.	Pos	Nat	Player	Apps	Goals	Apps	Goals	Apps	Goals	Apps	Goals
1	GK	(England) ENG	Scott Flinders	2	-3	0	0	1	-2	1	-1
2	DF	(England) ENG	Matthew Lawrence	41	1	37+2	1	1	0	0+1	0
3	DF	(England) ENG	Tony Craig	14	0	13	0	0	0	1	0
4	DF	(England) ENG	Clint Hill	31	3	30	3	0+1	0	0	0
5	DF	(England) ENG	Mark Hudson	49	2	47	2	1	0	1	0
6	DF	(England) ENG	Leon Cort (Note: Cort was born in Southwark, England, but also qualified to represent Guyana internationally and would make his international debut for Guyana in October 2011.)	12	0	12	0	0	0	0	0
7	MF	(Wales) WAL	Carl Fletcher (Note: Fletcher was born in Camberley, England, but also qualified to represent Wales internationally and made his international debut for Wales in 2004.)	29	1	17+11	1	1	0	0	0
8	FW	(England) ENG	James Scowcroft	40	9	35+4	9	1	0	0	0
9	FW	(Scotland) SCO	Dougie Freedman	20	2	4+15	1	0	0	1	1
10	FW	(Republic of Ireland) IRL	Clinton Morrison (Note: Morrison was born in Wandsworth, England, but also qualified to represent the Republic of Ireland internationally through his grandmother and made his international debut for the Republic of Ireland in August 2001.)	47	16	35+10	16	1	0	0+1	0
11	MF	(Barbados) BRB	Paul Ifill (Note: Ifill was born in Brighton, England, but also qualified to represent Barbados internationally through his parents and made his international debut for Barbados in June 2004.)	15	2	5+10	2	0	0	0	0
12	GK	(Argentina) ARG	Julián Speroni	48	-45	48	-45	0	0	0	0
14	MF	(England) ENG	Ben Watson	46	7	43+1	7	1	0	1	0
15	MF	(Republic of Ireland) IRL	Mark Kennedy	8	0	8	0	0	0	0	0
16	MF	(England) ENG	Neil Danns	4	0	2+2	0	0	0	0	0
17	FW	(Austria) AUT	Besian Idrizaj	7	0	3+4	0	0	0	0	0
17	FW	(England) ENG	Scott Sinclair	10	2	10	2	0	0	0	0
18	DF	(England) ENG	John Halls	5	0	5	0	0	0	0	0
19	MF	(England) ENG	Tom Soares	42	6	40+1	6	0	0	1	0
20	DF	(England) ENG	Danny Butterfield	33	0	27+5	0	0	0	1	0
21	MF	(England) ENG	Dave Martin	10	0	2+7	0	0	0	1	0
21	MF	(England) ENG	Kyel Reid	2	0	0+2	0	0	0	0	0
22	FW	(Scotland) SCO	Paul Dickov	9	0	6+3	0	0	0	0	0
22	MF	(England) ENG	Nathan Ashton	1	0	1	0	0	0	0	0
23	DF	(Portugal) POR	José Fonte	26	1	18+6	1	1	0	1	0
24	MF	(Northern Ireland) NIR	Jeff Hughes	10	0	4+6	0	0	0	0	0
25	MF	(England) ENG	Stuart Green	11	2	7+3	2	0	0	1	0
27	MF	(Cameroon) CMR	Franck Songo'o	9	0	9	0	0	0	0	0
28	MF	(England) ENG	Shaun Derry	34	0	34	0	0	0	0	0
30	MF	(England) ENG	John Bostock	5	0	1+3	0	1	0	0	0
31	DF	(England) ENG	Arron Fray	0	0	0	0	0	0	0	0
32	FW	(Finland) FIN	Shefki Kuqi (Note: Kuqi was born in Vučitrn, Yugoslavia (part of Serbia in 2007, but now part of Kosovo), but was raised in Finland and made his international debut for Finland in August 1999.)	9	0	2+6	0	0	0	1	0
33	FW	(England) ENG	Lewis Grabban	3	0	0+2	0	0	0	0+1	0
34	DF	(England) ENG	Lee Hills	13	1	6+6	1	1	0	0	0
35	DF	(Wales) WAL	Rhoys Wiggins (Note: Wiggins was born in Hillingdon, England, but also qualified to represent Wales internationally and has represented them at U-17, U-19, and U-21 level.)	0	0	0	0	0	0	0	0
36	MF	(England) ENG	Lewwis Spence	0	0	0	0	0	0	0	0
37	FW	(England) ENG	Charlie Sheringham	0	0	0	0	0	0	0	0
38	GK	(England) ENG	David Wilkinson	0	0	0	0	0	0	0	0
39	MF	(England) ENG	James Dayton	0	0	0	0	0	0	0	0
40	MF	(England) ENG	Ryan Hall	2	0	0+1	0	0+1	0	0	0
41	DF	(England) ENG	Moses Swaibu	0	0	0	0	0	0	0	0
42	FW	(England) ENG	Ben Kudjodji	1	0	0+1	0	0	0	0	0
43	FW	(England) ENG	Victor Moses (Note: Moses was born in Lagos, Nigeria, but obtained asylum in England at the age of 11, and represented them at youth level before making his international debut for Nigeria in 2012.)	15	3	10+5	3	0	0	0	0
44	FW	(Republic of Ireland) IRL	Sean Scannell (Note: Scannell was born in Croydon, England, but also qualified to represent the Republic of Ireland and Northern Ireland internationally through his father, as well as Jamaica, and has represented the Republic of Ireland at youth and B level.)	25	2	11+13	2	0+1	0	0	0
48	MF	(England) ENG	Ashley-Paul Robinson	6	0	0+6	0	0	0	0	0

== Players ==
=== Starting 11 ===
No.	Pos.	Nat.	Name	MS	Notes
12	GK	(Argentina)	Julián Speroni	48	
2	RB	(England)	Matthew Lawrence	38	Danny Butterfield has 28 starts
5	CB	(England)	Mark Hudson	49	
23	CB	(Portugal)	José Fonte	20	
4	LB	(England)	Clint Hill	30	
19	RM	(England)	Tom Soares	41	
14	CM	(England)	Ben Watson	45	
28	CM	(England)	Shaun Derry	32	
44	LM	(Republic of Ireland)	Sean Scannell	12	Carl Fletcher has 18 starts
8	CF	(England)	James Scowcroft	36	
10	CF	(Republic of Ireland)	Clinton Morrison	36	

== Club ==
=== Management ===
Position	Staff
Manager	(England) Peter Taylor (July–October)/ (England) Neil Warnock (October–June)
Assistant manager	(England) Mick Jones (October–June)
First team coach	(Wales) Kit Symons (July–October)/ (England) Keith Curle (October–June)
Goalkeeping coach	(England) Tony Burns (July–November)/ (England) Jim Stannard (November–June)
Chief scout	(Scotland) Allan Gemmill
Fitness coach	(England) Mark Hulse (July–November)/ (England) Carl Serrant (November–June)
Reserve team manager	(Wales) Kit Symons (July–October)/ (Scotland) Dougie Freedman (October–March)/ (England) Gary Issot (March–June)
Academy manager	(England) David Moss
U18 team/Assistant academy manager	(England) Gary Issott
Head physiotherapist	(England) Paul Caton

== League table ==
Pos	Team	Pld	W	D	L	GF	GA	GD	Pts	Promotion, qualification or relegation
3	Hull City (O, P)	46	21	12	13	65	47	+18	75	Qualification for Championship play-offs
4	Bristol City	46	20	14	12	54	53	+1	74	Qualification for Championship play-offs
5	Crystal Palace	46	18	17	11	58	42	+16	71	Qualification for Championship play-offs
6	Watford	46	18	16	12	62	56	+6	70	Qualification for Championship play-offs
7	Wolverhampton Wanderers	46	18	16	12	53	48	+5	70	

Updated to match(es) played on 4 May 2008. Source: The Football League
Rules for classification: 1) points; 2) goal difference; 3) number of goals scored.
(O) Play-off winners; (P) Promoted

== Matches ==
=== Preseason ===
13 July 2007	Chelmsford City	0–2	Crystal Palace	Chelmsford
19:00		(Report)	Freedman 74', 82'	Stadium: Melbourne Stadium; Attendance: 997; Referee: Rayford Lee

14 July 2007	Bromley	2–2	Crystal Palace	London
15:00	Hockton 56'; Chaaban 56'	(Report)	Duku 50' (o.g.); Green 90'	Stadium: Hayes Lane; Attendance: 3,148; Referee: Steve Bennett

17 July 2007	Aldershot Town	0–2	Crystal Palace	Aldershot
19:00		(Report)	Watson 22' (pen.); Kuqi 58'	Stadium: Recreation Ground; Attendance: 1,520; Referee: Steven Cook

20 July 2007	Dartford	0–3	Crystal Palace	Dartford
19:00		(Report)	Fletcher 16'; Green 56'; Ifill 89'	Stadium: Princes Park; Attendance: 4,100; Referee: Steve Bennett

21 July 2007	Barnet	2–3	Crystal Palace	London
15:00	Carew 69'; Yakubu 89'	(Report)	Giele 18' (o.g.); Watson 24'; Ifill 28'	Stadium: Underhill Stadium; Attendance: 1,371; Referee: Grant Hegley

24 July 2007	IFK Göteborg	1–2	Crystal Palace	Grebbestad
19:30	Mourad 74'	(Report)	Ifill 2'; Scowcroft 35'	Attendance: 1,300

27 July 2007	IK Oddevold	1–4	Crystal Palace
19:30	Engelbrektsson 60'	(Report)	Dayton; Morrison; Martin; Watson

31 July 2007	Crystal Palace	1–1	Anderlecht	London
20:00	Watson 50' (pen.)	(Report)	Théréau 26'	Stadium: Selhurst Park; Attendance: 5,232; Referee: Alan Wiley

4 August 2007	Crystal Palace	0–0	Everton	London
15:00		(Report)		Stadium: Selhurst Park; Attendance: 10,010; Referee: Phil Crossley

=== Football League Championship ===
11 August 2007	Southampton	1–4	Crystal Palace	Southampton
15:00	Saganowski 45+2'	(Report)	Scowcroft 30', 31', 55'; Morrison 57'	Stadium: St Mary's Stadium; Attendance: 25,054; Referee: Lee Probert

18 August 2007	Crystal Palace	2–2	Leicester City	London
15:00	Green 33'; Morrison 90+3'	(Report)	Campbell 63'; Kisnorbo 87'	Stadium: Selhurst Park; Attendance: 15,607; Referee: Michael Russell

26 August 2007	Ipswich Town	1–0	Crystal Palace	Ipswich
13:15	Walters 73'	(Report)		Stadium: Portman Road; Attendance: 19,382; Referee: Andy D'Urso

1 September 2007	Crystal Palace	0–1	Charlton Athletic	London
15:00		(Report)	Todorov 74'	Stadium: Selhurst Park; Attendance: 18,556; Referee: Nigel Miller

15 September 2007	Norwich City	1–0	Crystal Palace	Norwich
15:00	Střihavka 75'	(Report)		Stadium: Carrow Road; Attendance: 24,228; Referee: Lee Probert

18 September 2007	Crystal Palace	1–1	Coventry City	London
20:00	Green 26'	(Report)	Best 87'	Stadium: Selhurst Park; Attendance: 14,455; Referee: Andy Woolmer

22 September 2007	Crystal Palace	3–2	Sheffield United	London
15:00	Soares 60'; Fletcher 70'; Watson 89' (pen.)	(Report)	Hudson 48' (o.g.); Beattie 76'	Stadium: Selhurst Park; Attendance: 14,131; Referee: Kevin Friend

29 September 2007	Burnley	1–1	Crystal Palace	Burnley
15:00	Blake 13'	(Report)	Hudson 5'	Stadium: Turf Moor; Attendance: 10,711; Referee: Trevor Kettle

2 October 2007	Plymouth Argyle	1–0	Crystal Palace	Plymouth
19:45	Halmosi 50'	(Report)		Stadium: Home Park; Attendance: 10,451; Referee: Rob Shoebridge

6 October 2007	Crystal Palace	1–1	Hull City	London
15:00	Scowcroft 81'	(Report)	Marney 90+1' (pen.)	Stadium: Selhurst Park; Attendance: 15,769; Referee: Richard Beeby

20 October 2007	Blackpool	1–1	Crystal Palace	Blackpool
15:00	Fox 69'	(Report)	Soares 59' (red card) 88'	Stadium: Bloomfield Road; Attendance: 9,037; Referee: Graham Laws

23 October 2007	Crystal Palace	1–3	Stoke City	London
20:00	Freedman 51'	(Report)	Cresswell 49', 59'; Shawcross 74'	Stadium: Selhurst Park; Attendance: 14,237; Referee: Mike Thorpe

29 October 2007	Crystal Palace	0–2	Watford	London
20:00		(Report)	Smith 32'; King 67'	Stadium: Selhurst Park; Attendance: 13,986; Referee: Keith Stroud

3 November 2007	Scunthorpe United	0–0	Crystal Palace	Scunthorpe
15:00		(Report)		Stadium: Glanford Park; Attendance: 6,778; Referee: Clive Penton

6 November 2007	Cardiff City	1–1	Crystal Palace	Cardiff
19:45	Purse 9'	(Report)	Watson 44' (pen.)	Stadium: Ninian Park; Attendance: 11,781; Referee: Lee Mason

10 November 2007	Crystal Palace	1–1	Queens Park Rangers	London
15:00	Morrison 88'	(Report)	Sinclair 45'	Stadium: Selhurst Park; Attendance: 17,010; Referee: Peter Walton

24 November 2007	Colchester United	1–2	Crystal Palace	Colchester
15:00	Balwin (red card) 8'; Jackson 69'	(Report)	Morrison 8', 74'	Stadium: Layer Road; Attendance: 5,856; Referee: Paul Taylor

27 November 2007	Crystal Palace	2–1	Preston North End	London
19:45	Morrison 40'; Hill 45+3'	(Report)	Mawene 36'	Stadium: Selhurst Park; Attendance: 13,048; Referee: Phil Joslin

1 December 2007	Crystal Palace	1–1	West Bromwich Albion	London
15:00	Morrison 21'	(Report)	Hudson 8' (o.g.)	Stadium: Selhurst Park; Attendance: 15,247; Referee: Uriah Rennie

4 December 2007	Queens Park Rangers	1–2	Crystal Palace	London
20:00	Stewart 10'	(Report)	Hill 65'; Morrison 68'	Stadium: Loftus Road; Attendance: 13,300; Referee: Alan Wiley

8 December 2007	Barnsley	0–0	Crystal Palace	Barnsley
15:00		(Report)		Stadium: Oakwell; Attendance: 10,298; Referee: Anthony Bates

15 December 2007	Crystal Palace	2–1	Sheffield Wednesday	London
15:00	Morrison 37'; Scannell 90'	(Report)	Hinds 11'	Stadium: Selhurst Park; Attendance: 14,865; Referee: Grant Hegley

22 December 2007	Crystal Palace	2–1	Plymouth Argyle	London
15:00	Hill 8'; Scowcroft 44'	(Report)	Easter 49'	Stadium: Selhurst Park; Attendance: 15,097; Referee: Mike Jones

26 December 2007	Coventry City	0–2	Crystal Palace	Coventry
15:00		(Report)	Morrison 47'; Ifill 88'	Stadium: Ricoh Arena; Attendance: 22,134; Referee: Keith Stroud

29 December 2007	Sheffield United	0–1	Crystal Palace	Sheffield
12:45		(Report)	Scowcroft 38'	Stadium: Bramall Lane; Attendance: 23,982; Referee: Andy D'Urso

1 January 2008	Crystal Palace	1–1	Norwich City	London
15:00	Morrison 50'	(Report)	Russell 8'	Stadium: Selhurst Park; Attendance: 17,199; Referee: Mike Thorpe

12 January 2008	Wolverhampton Wanderers	0–3	Crystal Palace	Wolverhampton
15:00		(Report)	Morrison 24'; Scannell 49'; Scowcroft 69'	Stadium: Molineux Stadium; Attendance: 22,650; Referee: Howard Webb

19 January 2008	Crystal Palace	2–0	Bristol City	London
15:00	Morrison 6'; Hudson 85'	(Report)		Stadium: Selhurst Park; Attendance: 19,010; Referee: Jonathan Moss

28 January 2008	Leicester City	1–0	Crystal Palace	Leicester
19:45	Hayles 89'	(Report)		Stadium: Walkers Stadium; Attendance: 21,764; Referee: Eddie Ilderton

2 February 2008	Crystal Palace	1–1	Southampton	London
15:00	Scowcroft 73'	(Report)	John 84'	Stadium: Selhurst Park; Attendance: 17,967; Referee: Mark Halsey

8 February 2008	Charlton Athletic	2–0	Crystal Palace	London
19:45	Varney 60', 87'	(Report)		Stadium: The Valley; Attendance: 26,202; Referee: Lee Probert

12 February 2008	Crystal Palace	0–1	Ipswich Town	London
20:00		(Report)	Haynes 45+1'	Stadium: Selhurst Park; Attendance: 16,090; Referee: Clive Penton

18 February 2008	Bristol City	1–1	Crystal Palace	Bristol
20:00	McCombe 90+6'	(Report)	Hills 61'	Stadium: Ashton Gate; Attendance: 16,446; Referee: Richard Beeby

23 February 2008	Crystal Palace	0–2	Wolverhampton Wanderers	London
15:00		(Report)	Gray 76'; Kyle 89'	Stadium: Selhurst Park; Attendance: 15,679; Referee: Andy Woolmer

1 March 2008	Preston North End	0–1	Crystal Palace	Preston
15:00		(Report)	Morrison 76'	Stadium: Deepdale; Attendance: 12,347; Referee: Mike Jones

4 March 2008	Crystal Palace	0–0	Cardiff City	London
20:00		(Report)		Stadium: Selhurst Park; Attendance: 13,446; Referee: Scott Mathieson

8 March 2008	Crystal Palace	2–1	Colchester United	London
15:00	Ifil 21' (o.g.); Watson 74'	(Report)	Lisbie 23'	Stadium: Selhurst Park; Attendance: 13,985; Referee: Phil Joslin

12 March 2008	West Bromwich Albion	1–1	Crystal Palace	West Bromwich
19:45	Phillips 30'	(Report)	Moses 55'	Stadium: The Hawthorns; Attendance: 20,378; Referee: Peter Walton

15 March 2008	Crystal Palace	2–0	Barnsley	London
15:00	Soares 46'; Scowcroft 83'	(Report)		Stadium: Selhurst Park; Attendance: 17,459; Referee: Iain Williamson

22 March 2008	Sheffield Wednesday	2–2	Crystal Palace	Sheffield
15:00	Sahar 18'; Small 68'	(Report)	Watson 40'; Lawrence 90+4'	Stadium: Hillsborough; Attendance: 19,875; Referee: Russell Booth

29 March 2008	Crystal Palace	0–0	Blackpool	London
15:00		(Report)		Stadium: Selhurst Park; Attendance: 16,028; Referee: Anthony Taylor

7 April 2008	Stoke City	1–2	Crystal Palace	Stoke-upon-Trent
20:00	Whelan 85'	(Report)	Soares 23'; Fonte 45+1'	Stadium: Britannia Stadium; Attendance: 15,756; Referee: Mark Clattenburg

12 April 2008	Crystal Palace	2–0	Scunthorpe United	London
15:00	Soares 21'; Morrison 39'	(Report)		Stadium: Selhurst Park; Attendance: 15,975; Referee: Keith Hill

19 April 2008	Watford	0–2	Crystal Palace	Watford
15:00		(Report)	Ifill 72'; Moses 75'	Stadium: Vicarage Road; Attendance: 17,694; Referee: Howard Webb

26 April 2008	Hull City	2–1	Crystal Palace	Kingston upon Hull
15:00	Campbell 18'; Ashbee 85'	(Report)	Sinclair 38'	Stadium: KC Stadium; Attendance: 24,350; Referee: Russell Booth

4 May 2008	Crystal Palace	5–0	Burnley	London
14:00	Watson 8' (pen.); Moses 10'; Soares 37'; Sinclair 61'; Morrison 65'	(Report)	Carlisle (red card) 7'	Stadium: Selhurst Park; Attendance: 23,950; Referee: Kevin Friend

==== Football League Championship play-offs ====
===== Semi-final =====
10 May 2008	Crystal Palace	1–2	Bristol City	London
12:15	Watson 87' (pen.)	(Report)	Carey 53'; Noble 90+2'	Stadium: Selhurst Park; Attendance: 22,869; Referee: Mike Jones

13 May 2008	Bristol City	2–1 (4–2 agg.)	Crystal Palace	Bristol
19:45	Trundle 104'; McIndoe 110'	(Report)	Watson 24'	Stadium: Ashton Gate; Attendance: 18,842; Referee: Howard Webb

=== Football League Cup ===
14 August 2007 First round	Bristol Rovers	1–1 (4–1 p)	Crystal Palace	Bristol
19:45	Disley 64'	(Report)	Freedman 31'	Stadium: Memorial Stadium; Attendance: 5,566; Referee: Tony Bates
	Penalties
	Walker (penalty scored); Jacobson (penalty scored); Disley (penalty scored); Anthony (penalty scored)		(penalty missed) Freedman; (penalty scored) Morrison; (penalty missed) Kuqi

=== FA Cup ===
5 January 2008 Third round	Watford	2–0	Crystal Palace	Watford
15:00	Shittu 28', 65'	(Report)		Stadium: Vicarage Road; Attendance: 10,480; Referee: Lee Mason

== End-of-season awards ==
Award	Winner
Crystal Palace F.C. Player of the Year	Julián Speroni
Crystal Palace F.C. Young Player of the Year	Sean Scannell
Vice Presidents' Player of the Year	Shaun Derry
Vice Presidents' Young Player of the Year	Sean Scannell
Scholar Player of the Year	Lee Hills
Academy Player of the Year	Kyle de Silva
Crystal Palace F.C. Goal of the Season	James Scowcroft v Wolverhampton Wanderers (12–01–08)
Special Achievement Award	Clinton Morrison for scoring 100 Crystal Palace goals
Special Achievement Award	Geoff Thomas for his services to the club as captain (1988–1992)
