= 2008–09 Crystal Palace F.C. season =

English football club season

Crystal Palace
2008–09 season
- Chairman: Simon Jordan
- Manager: Neil Warnock
- Stadium: Selhurst Park
- Championship: 15th
- FA Cup: Fourth round
- League Cup: Second round
- Top goalscorer: League: Shefki Kuqi (10); All: Shefki Kuqi (10)
- Highest home attendance: 22,824 v Sheffield United (3 May 2009)
- Lowest home attendance: 12,847 v Birmingham City (24 February 2009)
- Average home league attendance: 15,220
Home colours	Away colours

The 2008–09 season was Crystal Palace Football Club's 4th consecutive season in the Championship, after their play-off defeat in the previous campaign.

== Statistics ==
Last updated on 10 January 2010.

No.	Pos	Nat	Player	Total		The Championship		FA Cup		League Cup	
No.	Pos	Nat	Player	Apps	Goals	Apps	Goals	Apps	Goals	Apps	Goals
1	GK	(Argentina) ARG	Julián Speroni	48	0	45	0	3	0	0	0
2	DF	(England) ENG	Matthew Lawrence	35	0	28+4	0	2	0	1	0
3	DF	(England) ENG	Clint Hill	48	2	43	1	3	1	2	0
4	MF	(England) ENG	Shaun Derry	42	0	35+4	0	2	0	1	0
5	DF	(Republic of Ireland) IRL	Paddy McCarthy	29	3	25+2	3	0	0	2	0
6	DF	(Portugal) POR	José Fonte	42	4	36+2	4	3	0	1	0
7	MF	(Wales) WAL	Carl Fletcher (Note: Fletcher was born in Camberley, England, but also qualified to represent Wales internationally and made his international debut for Wales in 2004.)	6	0	0+3	0	1	0	2	0
8	FW	(England) ENG	James Scowcroft	10	0	5+5	0	0	0	0	0
9	FW	(Republic of Ireland) IRL	Alan Lee	19	3	10+6	3	3	0	0	0
10	MF	(Australia) AUS	Nick Carle	41	4	35+2	3	2	0	2	1
11	FW	(England) ENG	Victor Moses (Note: Moses was born in Lagos, Nigeria, but obtained asylum in England at the age of 11, and represented them at youth level before making his international debut for Nigeria in 2012.)	32	2	19+8	2	3	0	2	0
12	GK	(England) ENG	Darryl Flahavan	3	-7	1	-2	0	0	2	-5
14	FW	(Republic of Ireland) IRL	Sean Scannell (Note: Scannell was born in Croydon, England, but also qualified to represent the Republic of Ireland and Northern Ireland internationally through his father, as well as Jamaica, and has represented the Republic of Ireland at youth and B level.)	27	3	16+9	2	1	1	1	0
15	DF	(England) ENG	Lee Hills	16	0	8+6	0	1	0	1	0
16	MF	(England) ENG	Neil Danns	23	3	14+6	2	3	1	0	0
17	FW	(England) ENG	Simon Thomas	1	0	0+1	0	0	0	0	0
18	FW	(England) ENG	Calvin Andrew	10	0	1+6	0	1	0	2	0
19	MF	(England) ENG	Tom Soares	5	1	4	1	0	0	1	0
19	FW	(Scotland) SCO	Craig Beattie	15	5	15	5	0	0	0	0
20	DF	(England) ENG	Danny Butterfield	30	1	17+9	1	3	0	1	0
22	DF	(Austria) AUT	Johannes Ertl	13	0	3+9	0	0	0	1	0
23	MF	(Barbados) BRB	Paul Ifill (Note: Ifill was born in Brighton, England, but also qualified to represent Barbados internationally through his parents and made his international debut for Barbados in June 2004.)	38	6	27+6	4	3	2	2	0
24	MF	(England) ENG	Ben Watson	19	5	18	5	0	0	1	0
25	DF	(Jamaica) JAM	Claude Davis	7	0	7	0	0	0	0	0
26	MF	(Wales) WAL	John Oster (Note: Oster was born in Boston, England, but also qualified to represent Wales internationally and made his international debut for Wales in 1997.)	33	4	27+4	3	1	0	1	1
27	MF	(France) FRA	Léandre Griffit	6	0	2+3	0	1	0	0	0
28	FW	(Portugal) POR	Rui Fonte	10	0	5+5	0	0	0	0	0
32	FW	(Finland) FIN	Shefki Kuqi (Note: Kuqi was born in Vučitrn, Yugoslavia (part of Serbia in 2007, but now part of Kosovo), but was raised in Finland and made his international debut for Finland in August 1999.)	37	10	20+15	10	2	0	0	0
33	FW	(Republic of Ireland) IRL	Anthony Stokes	13	1	11+2	1	0	0	0	0
35	DF	(Wales) WAL	Rhoys Wiggins (Note: Wiggins was born in Hillingdon, England, but also qualified to represent Wales internationally and has represented them at U-17, U-19, and U-21 level.)	1	0	1	0	0	0	0	0
37	DF	(England) ENG	Nathaniel Pinney	1	0	0+1	0	0	0	0	0
41	MF	(England) ENG	Kieran Djilali	8	0	2+4	0	0	0	2	0
42	MF	(England) ENG	James Comley	4	0	1+3	0	0	0	0	0
43	DF	(England) ENG	Nathaniel Clyne	29	0	25+1	0	3	0	0	0
44	MF	(England) ENG	Kieron Cadogan	4	1	0+4	1	0	0	0	0

== Club ==
=== Management ===
Position	Staff
Manager	(England) Neil Warnock
Assistant manager	(England) Mick Jones
First team coach	(England) Keith Curle
Goalkeeping coach	(England) Jim Stannard
Chief scout	(Scotland) Allan Gemmill
Fitness coach	(England) Louis Langdown
Reserve team manager	(England) Gary Issott
Academy manager	(England) David Moss
U18 team/Assistant academy manager	(England) Gary Issott
Physiotherapists	(England) Nigel Cox, Paul Timson and Sangi Patel

== League table ==
Pos	Team	Pld	W	D	L	GF	GA	GD	Pts
13	Watford	46	16	10	20	68	72	−4	58
14	Doncaster Rovers	46	17	7	22	42	53	−11	58
15	Crystal Palace	46	15	12	19	52	55	−3	56 (Note: Crystal Palace were give a one-point deduction for using an ineligible player during a match against Sheffield United on 3 May 2009.)
16	Blackpool	46	13	17	16	47	58	−11	56
17	Coventry City	46	13	15	18	47	58	−11	54

Updated to match(es) played on 3 May 2009. Source: The Football League
Rules for classification: 1) points; 2) goal difference; 3) number of goals scored.

== Matches ==
=== Preseason ===
12 July 2008	Bromley	1–1	Crystal Palace	London
15:00	Hockton 32'	(Report)	Hill 67'	Stadium: Hayes Lane; Attendance: 2,153; Referee: Steve Bennett

14 July 2008	Crawley Town	1–1	Crystal Palace	Crawley
19:45	Pinault 67' (pen.)	(Report)	Ifill 37'	Stadium: Broadfield Stadium; Attendance: 2,536

17 July 2008	Aldershot Town	3–4	Crystal Palace	Aldershot
19:45	Grant 23', 66' (pen.); Morgan 51' (pen.)	(Report)	Freedman 32' (pen.); Thomas 40'; Dayton 70'; Smith 82' (pen.)	Stadium: EBB Stadium; Attendance: 1,436

17 July 2008	Dartford	0–2	Crystal Palace XI	Dartford
19:45		(Report)	Dayton 56'; Comley 77'	Stadium: Princes Park; Attendance: 792; Referee: Ian Cooper

21 July 2008	Tavistock	0–4	Crystal Palace	Tavistock
19:00		(Report)	Andrew 40', 56'; Watson 52'; Short 54' (o.g.)	Stadium: Langsford Park; Attendance: 1,500

23 July 2008	Bodmin Town	1–4	Crystal Palace	Bodmin
19:50	O'Hagan 27'	(Report)	Ertl 46'; Fletcher 62'; Dayton 75', 80'	Stadium: Priory Park

25 July 2008	Truro City	0–1	Crystal Palace	Truro
19:50		(Report)	Thomas 35'	Stadium: Treyew Road

29 July 2008	Crystal Palace	0–0	Fulham XI	London
20:00		(Report)		Stadium: Selhurst Park; Attendance: 7,000; Referee: Phil Crossley

30 July 2008	Dagenham & Redbridge	3–2	Crystal Palace XI	Dagenham
19:45	Strevens 38'; Uddin 66'; Benson 73'	(Report)	Alaile 7' (o.g.); Abnett 60' (pen.)	Stadium: London Borough of Barking and Dagenham Stadium

30 July 2008	Afan Lido	4–1	Crystal Palace XI	Aberavon
19:45	Jones 25' (pen.), 32'; Wade 80' (pen.); Williams 86'	(Report)	Adelakun 33'	Stadium: Martsons Stadium; Attendance: 250

2 August 2008	Crystal Palace	1–1	Leicester City	London
15:00	Moses 60'	(Report)	Oakley 34'	Stadium: Selhurst Park; Attendance: 2,000; Referee: Phil Crossley

2 August 2008	Hemel Hempstead Town	0–1	Crystal Palace XI	Hemel Hempstead
15:00		(Report)	Djilali 56'	Stadium: Vauxhall Road

5 August 2008	Dover Athletic	2–3	Crystal Palace XI	River
19:00	Wallis 86'; Moore 89'	(Report)	Thomas 23' (pen.), 65', 68'	Stadium: Crabble Stadium; Attendance: 613; Referee: Paul Kelly

==== Errea South West Challenge Cup ====
===== Group phase =====
23 July 2008	Eastleigh	2–1	Crystal Palace XI	Appledore
19:00	Taggart (pen.); Davies	(Report)		Stadium: Marshford

25 July 2008	Crystal Palace XI	4–2	Bideford	Appledore
18:00	Nnanami 28'; Levins 65'; 81' (o.g.); Adelakun 84'	(Report)	Woods 56'; Barker 72'	Stadium: Marshford

Crystal Palace finished second in their group with three points and thus qualified for the semifinal stage. However, with the squad heavily depleted through injury, Palace opted to give their semifinal place to third-placed team Torquay United

=== Football League Championship ===
9 August 2008	Crystal Palace	0–0	Watford	London
15:00		(Report)		Stadium: Selhurst Park; Attendance: 15,614; Referee: Mike Jones

16 August 2008	Preston North End	2–0	Crystal Palace	Preston
15:00	Nicholson 58'; Chaplow 90+1'	(Report)		Stadium: Deepdale; Attendance: 14,225; Referee: Keith Woolmer

23 August 2008	Crystal Palace	0–0	Burnley	London
15:00	Scowcroft (yellow card) 47' (red card); Derry (yellow card) 52' (red card)	(Report)		Stadium: Selhurst Park; Attendance: 14,071; Referee: Iain Williamson

30 August 2008	Reading	4–2	Crystal Palace	Reading
15:00	Harper 18'; Doyle 68', 68', 89'	(Report)	Carle 37' (pen.); Soares 64'	Stadium: Madejski Stadium; Attendance: 20,441; Referee: Clive Penton

13 September 2008	Crystal Palace	2–0	Swansea City	London
15:00	Watson 28'; Carle 66'	(Report)		Stadium: Selhurst Park; Attendance: 14,621; Referee: Lee Mason

16 September 2008	Wolverhampton Wanderers	2–1	Crystal Palace	Wolverhampton
19:45	Ebanks-Blake 1'; Keogh 58'	(Report)	Ifill 32'	Stadium: Molineux Stadium; Attendance: 22,200; Referee: Scott Mathieson

20 September 2008	Crystal Palace	1–2	Plymouth Argyle	London
15:00	McCarthy 85'	(Report)	Gallagher 28', 56'	Stadium: Selhurst Park; Attendance: 14,209; Referee: Neil Swarbrick

27 September 2008	Ipswich Town	1–1	Crystal Palace	Ipswich
17:20	Stead 23'	(Report)	Moses 25'	Stadium: Portman Road; Attendance: 19,032; Referee: Darren Deadman

30 September 2008	Crystal Palace	1–0	Charlton Athletic	London
20:00	Beattie 63'	(Report)		Stadium: Selhurst Park; Attendance: 16,358; Referee: Mike Russell

4 October 2008	Nottingham Forest	0–2	Crystal Palace	Nottinghamshire
15:00		(Report)	Ifill 4'; Kuqi 81'	Stadium: City Ground; Attendance: 22,811; Referee: Richard Beeby

18 October 2008	Crystal Palace	3–0	Barnsley	London
17:20	Watson 25' (pen.), 60'; Kuqi 82'	(Report)		Stadium: Selhurst Park; Attendance: 16,494; Referee: Anthony Bates

21 October 2008	Birmingham City	1–0	Crystal Palace	Birmingham
19:45	O'Connor 90+4'	(Report)		Stadium: St Andrew's; Attendance: 17,706; Referee: Nigel Miller

25 October 2008	Blackpool	2–2	Crystal Palace	Blackpool
15:00	Burgess 48'; Evatt 65'	(Report)	Ifill 28'; Beattie 49'	Stadium: Bloomfield Road; Attendance: 7,597; Referee: Anthony Taylor

28 October 2008	Crystal Palace	1–2	Nottingham Forest	London
20:00	Kuqi 75'	(Report)	Cohen 28'; Thornhill 81'	Stadium: Selhurst Park; Attendance: 15,162; Referee: Andy D'Urso

1 November 2008	Crystal Palace	1–1	Sheffield Wednesday	London
15:00	Watson 54' (pen.)	(Report)	Clarke 7'	Stadium: Selhurst Park; Attendance: 14,650; Referee: Kevin Wright

8 November 2008	Coventry City	0–2	Crystal Palace	Coventry
15:00		(Report)	Hill 9'; Watson 53'	Stadium: Ricoh Arena; Attendance: 16,883; Referee: Clive Oliver

15 November 2008	Cardiff City	2–1	Crystal Palace	Cardiff
15:00	Chopra 33' (pen.); Ledley 53'	(Report)	Scannell 37'; Lawrence (red card) 90+4'	Stadium: Ninian Park; Attendance: 17,478; Referee: Jonathan Moss

22 November 2008	Crystal Palace	4–2	Bristol City	London
15:00	Oster 11'; Scannell 13'; Beattie 65'; Fonte 72'	(Report)	Adebola 44'; Maynard 74'	Stadium: Selhurst Park; Attendance: 14,599; Referee: Grant Hegley

25 November 2008	Norwich City	1–2	Crystal Palace	Norwich
19:45	Pattison 61'	(Report)	Beattie 27'; Oster 40'	Stadium: Carrow Road; Attendance: 24,034; Referee: Dean Whitestone

29 November 2008	Crystal Palace	0–0	Queens Park Rangers	London
15:00		(Report)		Stadium: Selhurst Park; Attendance: 16,411; Referee: Rob Styles

6 December 2008	Derby County	1–2	Crystal Palace	Derby
15:00	Varney 41'	(Report)	McCarthy 3'; Kuqi 61'	Stadium: Pride Park Stadium; Attendance: 27,203; Referee: Michael Oliver

8 December 2008	Crystal Palace	3–0	Southampton	London
20:00	Kuqi 9'; Beattie 15'; Ifill 75'	(Report)		Stadium: Selhurst Park; Attendance: 13,799; Referee: Darren Deadman

13 December 2008	Crystal Palace	2–1	Doncaster Rovers	London
15:00	Kuqi 21' (pen.); Lee 89'	(Report)	Heffernan 15'	Stadium: Selhurst Park; Attendance: 13,811; Referee: Andy Hall

20 December 2008	Sheffield United	2–2	Crystal Palace	Sheffield
17:20	Dyer 41'; Beattie 88' (pen.)	(Report)	McCarthy 47'; Carle 90+5'	Stadium: Bramall Lane; Attendance: 23,045; Referee: Paul Taylor

26 December 2008	Crystal Palace	3–1	Norwich City	London
13:00	Fonte 6', 31'; Butterfield 90'	(Report)	Doherty 19'	Stadium: Selhurst Park; Attendance: 17,810; Referee: Keith Stroud

28 December 2008	Bristol City	1–0	Crystal Palace	Bristol
15:00	Maynard 2'	(Report)		Stadium: Ashton Gate; Attendance: 18,265; Referee: Andy Penn

17 January 2009	Crystal Palace	1–4	Ipswich Town	London
15:00	Lee 31'	(Report)	Garvan 19'; Norris 28'; Lisbie 69'; Hill 89' (o.g.)	Stadium: Selhurst Park; Attendance: 15,348; Referee: Clive Penton

27 January 2009	Charlton Athletic	1–0	Crystal Palace	Charlton
19:45	Spring 14'	(Report)		Stadium: The Valley; Attendance: 20,627; Referee: Stuart Attwell

31 January 2009	Crystal Palace	0–1	Blackpool	London
15:00		(Report)	Campbell 41' (pen.)	Stadium: Selhurst Park; Attendance: 13,810; Referee: Andre Marriner

17 February 2009	Plymouth Argyle	1–3	Crystal Palace	Plymouth
19:45	Sawyer 68'	(Report)	Danns 21'; Lee 28'; Oster 43'	Stadium: Home Park; Attendance: 10,710; Referee: Rob Shoebridge

21 February 2009	Sheffield Wednesday	2–0	Crystal Palace	Sheffield
15:00	McAllister 80'; Clarke 90+3'	(Report)		Stadium: Hillsborough; Attendance: 22,687; Referee: Colin Webster

24 February 2009	Crystal Palace	0–0	Birmingham City	London
20:00	Carle (red card) 76'	(Report)		Stadium: Selhurst Park; Attendance: 12,847; Referee: Paul Taylor

28 February 2009	Watford	2–0	Crystal Palace	Watford
15:00	Cowie 22'; J. Fonte 72' (o.g.)	(Report)		Stadium: Vicarage Road; Attendance: 15,529; Referee: Grant Hegley

3 March 2009	Crystal Palace	0–1	Wolverhampton Wanderers	London
20:00		(Report)	Ebanks-Blake 74' (pen.)	Stadium: Selhurst Park; Attendance: 14,907; Referee: Graham Horwood

7 March 2009	Crystal Palace	2–1	Preston North End	London
15:00	Stokes 32'; Danns 34'	(Report)	Jones 29'	Stadium: Selhurst Park; Attendance: 16,340; Referee: Russell Booth

11 March 2009	Burnley	4–2	Crystal Palace	Burnley
19:45	Carlisle 39'; Alexander 81' (pen.); Thompson 88'; Rodriguez 90+3'	(Report)	Kuqi 26'; Carlisle 35' (o.g.)	Stadium: Turf Moor; Attendance: 10,312; Referee: Carl Boyeson

14 March 2009	Swansea City	1–3	Crystal Palace	Swansea
15:00	Pintado 66'	(Report)	Moses 49'; J. Fonte 61'; Kuqi 90+3'	Stadium: Liberty Stadium; Attendance: 13,663; Referee: Roger East

17 March 2009	Barnsley	3–1	Crystal Palace	Barnsley
19:45	Campbell-Ryce 23'; Hills 52' (o.g.); Mifsud 73'	(Report)	Kuqi 8'	Stadium: Oakwell; Attendance: 10,885; Referee: Graham Salisbury

21 March 2009	Crystal Palace	0–0	Reading	London
17:20		(Report)	Rosenior (red card) 72'	Stadium: Selhurst Park; Attendance: 14,567; Referee: Andy D'Urso

4 April 2009	Queens Park Rangers	0–0	Crystal Palace	London
15:00		(Report)		Stadium: Loftus Road; Attendance: 15,234; Referee: Scott Mathieson

7 April 2009	Crystal Palace	1–1	Coventry City	London
20:00	Cadogan 72'	(Report)	Gunnarsson 31'	Stadium: Selhurst Park; Attendance: 12,898; Referee: Fred Graham

11 April 2009	Crystal Palace	0–2	Cardiff City	London
15:00			McCormack 22' (pen.), 90+2'	Stadium: Selhurst Park; Attendance: 12,898; Referee: Russell Booth

13 April 2009	Southampton	1–0	Crystal Palace	Southampton
15:00	McGoldrick 67'	(Report)		Stadium: St Mary's Stadium; Attendance: 23,220; Referee: Mike Russell

18 April 2009	Crystal Palace	1–0	Derby County	London
15:00	Moses (yellow card) 60' (red card); Kuqi 63'	(Report)		Stadium: Selhurst Park; Attendance: 14,736; Referee: Andy Woolmer

25 April 2009	Doncaster Rovers	2–0	Crystal Palace	Doncaster
15:00	Shiels 45'; Hayter 75'	(Report)		Stadium: Keepmoat Stadium; Attendance: 12,880; Referee: Anthony Taylor

3 May 2009	Crystal Palace	0–0	Sheffield United	London
13:15		(Report)		Stadium: Selhurst Park; Attendance: 22,824; Referee: Chris Foy

=== Football League Cup ===
12 August 2008 First round	Crystal Palace	2–1	Hereford United	London
20:00	Carle 45'; Oster 49'	(Report)	Ashikodi 41'	Stadium: Selhurst Park; Attendance: 3,094; Referee: Trevor Kettle

26 August 2008 Second round	Leeds United	4–0	Crystal Palace	Leeds
19:45	Douglas 11'; Beckford 32'; Becchio 52'; Showunmi 76'	(Report)		Stadium: Elland Road; Attendance: 10,765; Referee: Kevin Friend

=== FA Cup ===
3 January 2009 Third round	Leicester City	0–0	Crystal Palace	Leicester
15:00		(Report)		Stadium: Walkers Stadium; Attendance: 15,976; Referee: Graham Laws

13 January 2009 Third round replay	Crystal Palace	2–1	Leicester City	London
20:00	Ifill 38'; Scannell 55'	(Report)	Gradel 90+4'	Stadium: Selhurst Park; Attendance: 6,023; Referee: Steve Tanner

24 January 2009 Fourth round	Watford	4–3	Crystal Palace	Watford
15:00	DeMerit 17'; Cork 27'; Hoskins 67'; Rasiak 70'	(Report)	Hill 47'; Danns 83'; Ifill 90+5'	Stadium: Vicarage Road; Attendance: 10,006; Referee: Michael Oliver

== End-of-season awards ==
Award	Winner
Crystal Palace F.C. Player of the Year	Julián Speroni
Crystal Palace F.C. Young Player of the Year	Nathaniel Clyne
Vice Presidents' Player of the Year	José Fonte
Vice Presidents' Young Player of the Year	Nathaniel Clyne
Scholar Player of the Year	Nathaniel Clyne
Academy Player of the Year	Alex Wynter
Crystal Palace F.C. Goal of the Season	Paddy McCarthy v Derby County (06-12-08)
Special Achievement Award	Crystal Palace F.C. squad of the 1978–79 season for winning the Second Division title
