= List of Chesham United F.C. seasons =

Chesham United Football Club is an English football club based in Chesham, Buckinghamshire, currently playing in the Southern League, nicknamed "the Generals".

== Key ==
Top scorer and number of goals scored shown in bold when he was also top scorer for the division.

Key to league record

- Lvl = Level of the league in the current league system
- S = Numbers of seasons
- Pld = Games played
- W = Games won
- D = Games drawn
- L = Games lost
- GF = Goals for
- GA = Goals against
- GD = Goals difference
- Pts = Points
- Position = Position in the final league table
- Overall position = Overall club position in the English league system

Key to cup records

- Res = Final reached round
- Rec = Final club record in the form of wins-draws-losses
- PR = Premilinary round
- QR1 = Qualifying round 1
- QR2 = Qualifying round 2
- QR3 = Qualifying round 3
- QR4 = Qualifying round 4
- R1 = Round 1
- R2 = Round 2
- R3 = Round 3
- R4 = Round 4
- R5 = Round 5
- R6 = Round 6
- QF = Quarter-finals
- SF = Semi-finals
- RU = Runners-up
- W = Winners
- Average home attendance = for league games only

== Seasons ==
Year	League	Lvl	Pld	W	D	L	GF	GA	GD	Pts	Position	Leading league scorer		FA Cup		FA Trophy		Average home attendance
Year	League	Lvl	Pld	W	D	L	GF	GA	GD	Pts	Position	Name	Goals	Res	Rec	Res	Rec	Average home attendance
2004–05	Southern Football League; Premier Division	7	42	18	5	19	84	82	2	59	**12th of 22**			QR1	0-1-1	R1	0-0-1	
2005–06	Southern Football League; Premier Division	7	42	9	9	24	43	84	−41	36	**22nd of 22**; Relegated			QR1	0-0-1	QR1	0-0-1	
2006–07	Southern Football League; Division One South & West	8	42	17	6	19	68	79	−11	57	**15th of 22**; Transferred			QR1	1-0-1	PR	0-0-1	
2007–08	Southern Football League; Division One Midlands	8	42	23	7	10	78	40	28	76	**6th of 22**			QR2	2-1-1	QR2	2-0-1	
2008–09	Southern Football League; Division One Midlands	8	42	22	10	10	70	38	32	76	**5th of 22**; Lost in playoff semifinal			QR3	3-0-1	R1	3-1-1	
2009–10	Southern Football League; Division One Midlands	8	42	24	8	10	76	41	25	80	**4th of 22**; Promoted through playoffs			QR3	3-1-1	QR1	1-1-1	
2010–11	Southern Football League; Premier Division	7	40	20	11	9	64	35	+29	71	**6th of 21**	Steve Wales	14	QR2	1-1-1	QR1	0-1-1	339
2011–12	Southern Football League; Premier Division	7	42	21	10	11	76	53	+23	73	**4th of 22**; Lost in playoff semifinal	Simon Thomas	20	QR2	1-0-1	QR2	1-1-1	349
2012–13	Southern Football League; Premier Division	7	42	21	12	9	69	48	+21	75	**3rd of 22**; Lost in playoff semifinal	Simon Thomas	16	QR1	0-0-1	R2	4-1-1	323
2013–14	Southern Football League; Premier Division	7	44	29	5	10	102	47	+55	92	**2nd of 23**; Lost in playoff final	Drew Roberts	34	QR1	0-0-1	R1	3-0-1	378
2014–15	Southern Football League; Premier Division	7	44	16	12	16	79	72	+7	60	**12th of 23**	Ryan Blake	18	QR1	0-1-1	QR1	0-0-1	297
2015–16	Southern Football League; Premier Division	7	46	18	10	18	72	70	+2	64	**11th of 24**	David Pearce	13	R2	5-1-1	R1	3-2-1	270
2016–17	Southern Football League; Premier Division	7	46	18	10	18	67	62	+5	64	**11th of 24**	Sam Youngs	14	R1	4-1-1	QR2	1-0-1	324
2017–18	Southern Football League; Premier Division	7	46	21	11	14	85	61	+24	74	**8th of 24**			QR2	1-0-1	R1	3-0-1	297
2018–19	Southern Football League Premier Division South	7	42	15	14	13	54	55	−1	59	**10th of 22**			QR2	1-0-1	QR2	1-1-1	313
2019–20	Southern Football League Premier Division South	7	33	21	3	9	70	44	+26	66	**2nd of 22**			QR2	1-0-1	QR1	0-0-1	433
2020–21	Southern Football League Premier Division South	7	7	3	3	1	6	4	+2	12	**7th of 20**			QR1	0-1-1	R3	2-1-1	482
2021–22	Southern Football League Premier Division South	7	42	22	11	9	80	50	+30	77	**6th of 22**			QR2	1-1-1	QR3	0-1-0	455
2022–23	Southern Football League Premier Division South	7	42	23	10	9	88	57	+29	79	**5th of 22**; Lost in playoff semifinal			QR2	1-1-1	R1	1-1-0	426
2023–24	Southern Football League Premier Division South	7	42	28	6	8	83	46	+37	90	**1st of 22**; Promoted			R1	4-1-1	R1	1-1-0	718
2024–25	National League South	6	46	16	11	19	61	72	-11	59	**13th of 24**			R1	3-1-1	R3	1-0-1	837
