= Kieron Cadogan =

English footballer (born 1990)

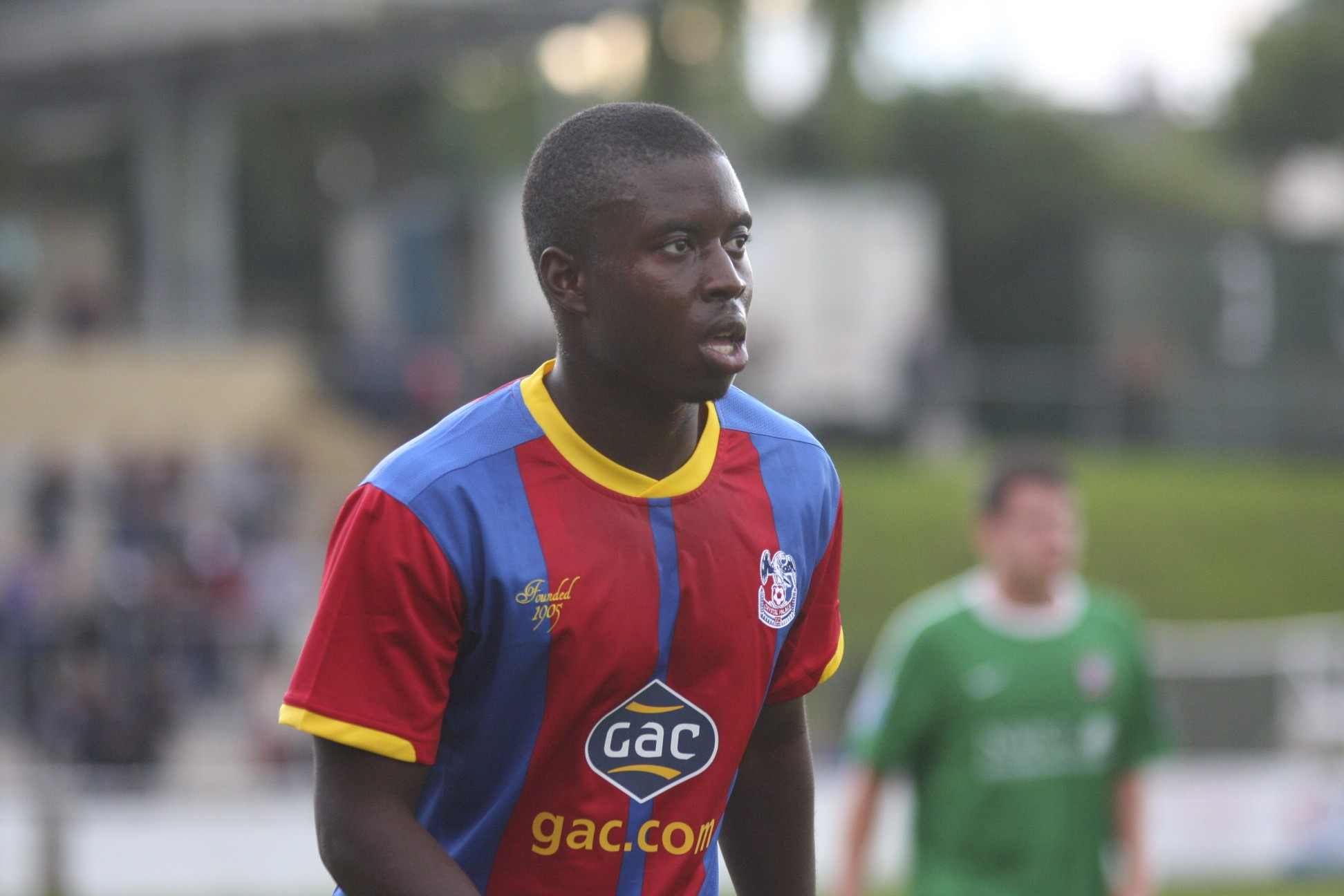

Personal information
- Full name: Kieron James Nathan Cadogan
- Date of birth: 16 August 1990 (age 36)
- Place of birth: Tooting, England
- Position: Right winger

Team information
- Current team: Corinthian-Casuals

Youth career
- Arsenal
- Fulham
- –2008: Crystal Palace

Senior career*
Years	Team	Apps	(Gls)
2008–2012	Crystal Palace	21	(2)
2009	→ Burton Albion (loan)	3	(0)
2012	→ Rotherham United (loan)	13	(1)
2012–2013	Aldershot Town	23	(1)
2013–2014	Barnet	22	(0)
2014–2017	GAIS	64	(12)
2017–2019	Sutton United	70	(11)
2019	Billericay Town	11	(4)
2019	→ Woking (loan)	8	(1)
2020	Wealdstone	0	(0)
2020–2022	Corinthian-Casuals	48	(10)
2022–2023	Kingstonian	19	(3)
2023–2024	Sevenoaks Town	56	(19)
2024–	Corinthian-Casuals	6	(6)
- * Club domestic league appearances and goals as of 20:43, 17 September 2024 (UTC)

Kieron James Nathan Cadogan (born 16 August 1990) is an English professional footballer who plays for Corinthian-Casuals as a right winger or forward.

== Club career ==
=== Crystal Palace ===
Cadogan came through the Crystal Palace Academy where he caused a stir as an effective right winger as his considerable skill and crossing ability made him a formidable opponent for full backs. He became a regular for the Crystal Palace Reserve side and scored his first hat-trick against Lewes Reserves. In a pre-season friendly on 14 July 2008 away to Aldershot Town, Cadogan was tackled in the final kick of the game, fracturing his ankle and was out injured for 11 weeks. Regardless, he so impressed manager Neil Warnock, that he was offered a professional contract which he signed within days of his 18th birthday. In Cadogan's first professional league match for Crystal Palace on 7 April 2009 against Coventry City, when having only been on the pitch 10 minutes, after a through ball from Victor Moses, Cadogan rounded the keeper and scored in the 72nd minute. Cadogan made a further three appearances that season from the bench. He also played for the reserves where he scored a further 17 goals alongside 11 assists. He finished top goal scorer for the Totesport.com Central Division.

The following season Cadogan went on a month loan to League 2 side Burton Albion where he made three appearances.

In 2010–11 Cadogan, alongside his teammate Wilfried Zaha had a full pre-season with the Crystal Palace first team, going on tour and playing pre-season friendlies stamping their place as a part of the squad. Cadogan had a particularly impressive game against Brentford the week before the championship campaign opened, scoring a goal and showing his quality against league opposition under the eyes of the new manager. Cadogan then went on to start the first game of the season for Crystal Palace making his full debut under George Burley in the 3–2 win against Leicester City, assisting Darren Ambrose's goal. On 24 August 2010, in the second round of the League Cup game away to Portsmouth where Edgar Davids made his Crystal Palace debut, Cadogan came off the bench in the 68th minute. His cross forced Portsmouth's Ibrahima Sonko to score an own goal bringing the result to 1–1 forcing the game into extra time and then to penalties. Although Cadogan scored in the penalty shoot out, Crystal Palace went on to lose the game (4–3) on penalties.

On 2 October 2010, Cadogan scored his second senior goal for Crystal Palace in the 1–2 defeat to Queens Park Rangers, then managed by the man who had given him his professional contract, Neil Warnock. On scoring his goal, Cadogan celebrated with a number of young Crystal Palace players on the pitch at the time by doing 'The Eagle Skank' – a dance some of the younger Crystal Palace players had made up whilst on holiday in Greece earlier that summer.

In May 2011, lifelong Crystal Palace fan Dean Williams used the image of Cadogan's celebration in a billboard campaign entitled 'Born in South London'. The billboards, also featuring teammates Sean Scannell and Nathaniel Clyne, advertised the graduates born in South London who had come through the Crystal Palace academy.

In the 2011–12 season, after featuring in just two games for Crystal Palace, he was loaned out to League Two side Rotherham United in January to continue his footballing education and gain experience.

On his return to his parent club on 10 August 2012, it was announced that his contract had been cancelled by mutual consent. Cadogan found first team games at Crystal Palace hard to come by as the team were strengthened for a promotion push into the Premier League.

=== Aldershot Town ===
On 29 September 2012, Cadogan joined Aldershot Town on a short-term three-month contract.

On 15 January 2013, after making 15 starts for Aldershot Town and assisting eight goals Cadogan was rewarded with an 18-month extended contract. Manager Dean Holdsworth said "I am absolutely delighted with this signing. Since joining us Kieron has grown in confidence and really adapted to our style of play. His quality of deliveries has been superb and he will improve because he is hungry to do so. I am delighted he has committed to the club". Cadogan showed his quality in assisting strikers from the wing. In particular during an FA cup game on 5 January 2013 at home to Rotherham. Cadogan got a hat trick of assists, setting up all three goals for Danny Hylton. The 3–1 win took Aldershot into the fourth round of the FA Cup for the first time, before eventually going out to Championship side Middlesbrough.

At the end of the 2012–13 season, when Aldershot Town were relegated from The Football League, Cadogan was one of thirteen players to be made redundant in the wake of the club's administration. Cadogan featured 28 times, making 25 starts and the topped the assists chart for Aldershot Town that season.

=== Barnet ===
On 5 October 2013, Cadogan joined Barnet. Cadogan left Barnet on 22 April 2014 after making 23 appearances in the league.

=== GAIS ===
On 11 August 2014, following an unsuccessful trial with Scottish Championship winners Dundee, where he started in a 2–0 victory over English champions Manchester City, Cadogan signed a season-long deal with Swedish Superettan club GAIS.

=== Sutton United ===
On 27 February 2017, Cadogan signed a deal with National League club Sutton United. He made his first appearance for the club on 4 March, coming on as a 68th-minute substitute for Maxime Biamou in a 0–0 draw at Barrow, Sutton's first away clean sheet back in the non-League top flight since a 9–0 away victory against Gateshead on 22 September 1990. Cadogan made his full debut on 11 March in a 2–2 home draw against York City and on 14 March, Cadogan scored his first goal for Sutton, a 96th minute consolation goal in a 2–1 home loss to Forest Green Rovers. On 25 March, Cadogan netted his first brace for Sutton in a man of the match performance, scoring the final two goals in a 5–1 defeat of North Ferriby United. After scoring three goals in his first six appearances, Cadogan was voted player of the month for March. He finished the season with five goals in 14 appearances. On 19 August, Cadogan scored his first goal of Sutton's 2017-18 campaign in a 3–2 away win against Chester. In the January 2019 Transfer Window Cadogan left Sutton after scoring 3 goals that season. In total Cadogan had notched up 18 goals in his Sutton career.

=== Billericay Town ===
On 1 January 2019, Cadogan joined National League South side Billericay Town.

On 28 March 2019, Cadogan signed on loan for National League South side Woking for the rest of the season.

=== Wealdstone ===
Cadogan signed for Wealdstone on 10 January 2020.

=== Kingstonian ===
In July 2022, Cadogan joined Kingstonian following two seasons with Corinthian-Casuals.

=== Sevenoaks Town ===
In January 2023, Cadogan joined Sevenoaks Town.

== Career statistics ==
As of match played 23 April 2022.

Club	Season	League			National Cup		League Cup		Other		Total	
Club	Season	Division	Apps	Goals	Apps	Goals	Apps	Goals	Apps	Goals	Apps	Goals
Crystal Palace	2008–09	Championship	4	1	0	0	0	0	—		4	1
Crystal Palace	2009–10	Championship	0	0	—		0	0	—		0	0
Crystal Palace	2010–11	Championship	16	1	1	0	2	0	—		19	1
Crystal Palace	2011–12	Championship	1	0	1	0	0	0	—		2	0
Crystal Palace	Total		21	2	2	0	2	0	—		25	2
Burton Albion (loan)	2009–10	League Two	2	0	1	0	0	0	0	0	3	0
Rotherham United (loan)	2011–12	League Two	13	1	—		—		—		13	1
Aldershot Town	2012–13	League Two	23	1	4	0	0	0	1 (Note: Appearance(s) in Football League Trophy)	0	28	1
Barnet	2013–14	Conference Premier	22	0	2	0	—		2 (Note: Appearance(s) in FA Trophy)	0	26	0
GAIS	2014	Superettan	9	2	1	0	—		—		10	2
GAIS	2015	Superettan	28	5	4	1	—		—		32	6
GAIS	2016	Superettan	27	5	1	0	—		—		28	5
GAIS	Total		64	12	6	1	—		—		70	13
Sutton United	2016–17	National League	14	5	—		—		—		14	5
Sutton United	2017–18	National League	39	3	2	2	—		3 (Note: Two appearances and one goal in FA Trophy, one appearance in National League play-offs)	1	45	6
Sutton United	2018–19	National League	17	3	3	0	—		3 (Note: Two appearances in Scottish Challenge Cup, one in FA Trophy)	0	23	3
Sutton United	Total		70	11	5	2	—		6	1	82	14
Billericay Town	2018–19	National League South	11	2	—		—		—		11	2
Woking (loan)	2018–19	National League South	8	1	—		—		2 (Note: Appearance(s) in National League South play-offs)	0	10	1
Wealdstone	2019–20	National League South	0	0	—		—		0	0	0	0
Corinthian-Casuals	2019–20	Isthmian League Premier Division	1	0	—		—		—		1	0
Corinthian-Casuals	2020–21	Isthmian League Premier Division	9	1	2	1	—		2	1	13	3
Corinthian-Casuals	2021–22	Isthmian League Premier Division	38	9	7	2	—		2 (Note: One appearance in FA Trophy, one in Alan Turvey Trophy)	0	47	11
Corinthian-Casuals	Total		48	10	9	3	—		4	1	61	14
Career total			282	40	29	6	2	0	15	2	328	48

== Honours ==
=== Club ===
Woking

- National League South play-offs: 2018–19
