= James Comley =

English footballer (born 1991)

Personal information
- Full name: James Richard Comley
- Date of birth: 24 January 1991 (age 35)
- Place of birth: Holloway, London, England
- Height: 1.78 m (5 ft 10 in)
- Position: Midfielder

Youth career
- ?–2009: Crystal Palace

Senior career*
Years	Team	Apps	(Gls)
2008–2010	Crystal Palace	4	(0)
2012	Canvey Island	8	(0)
2012	St Albans City	6	(0)
2012	Kettering Town	0	(0)
2012–2016	St Albans City	114	(12)
2016	→ Maidenhead United (loan)	16	(0)
2016–2021	Maidenhead United	161	(2)
2021	Walton Casuals	7	(2)
2021–2022	Boreham Wood	18	(0)
2022–2023	Dulwich Hamlet	11	(0)
2023–2024	Hampton & Richmond Borough	5	(0)
2024–2025	Hayes & Yeading United	17	(0)

International career^{‡}
2014	England C	1	(0)
2015–2025	Montserrat	25	(1)
- * Club domestic league appearances and goals as of 21:53, 4 June 2025 (UTC) ‡ National team caps and goals as of 10:12, 7 October 2026 (UTC)

James Richard Comley (born 24 January 1991) is an English footballer who plays as a midfielder for the Montserrat national team.

== Club career ==
Comley came through the youth system at Crystal Palace and made his English Football League debut on 17 March 2009 as a substitute against Barnsley. He made three further appearances in the league in the 2008–09 season, and played twice in the FA Cup the following season, before being released in June 2010.

Comley was without a club in the 2010–11 season due to injury, and trained with Tottenham Hotspur in the first half of the 2011–12 season before joining Canvey Island in January 2012.

He then joined St Albans City for the remainder of the season. For 2012–13, he joined Kettering Town, but made no appearances due to injury and rejoined St Albans in December 2012.

Comley joined Maidenhead United on loan in February 2016. The loan was made permanent at the end of the season. Comley left the Magpies at the end of the 2020–21 season after 196 appearances since first joining the club.

Comley joined Walton Casuals in October 2021. He joined Boreham Wood the following month. Comley was released in June 2022.

On 29 June 2022, Comley joined National League South club Dulwich Hamlet following his release from Boreham Wood.

On 3 March 2023, he signed for Hampton & Richmond Borough.

In December 2024, Comley joined Isthmian League South Central Division side Hayes & Yeading United.

== International career ==
Comley played for the England C team in October 2014 against a Turkey U23 side.

In March 2015, Comley was called up by Montserrat for 2018 World Cup qualifying, playing in both legs of a 3–4 aggregate defeat to Curaçao.

== Personal life ==
Comley's younger brother Brandon is also a footballer. He is also a Montserrat international and the brothers played together for the first time against El Salvador in September 2018.

== Career statistics ==
=== Club ===
As of match played 18 February 2023

Appearances and goals by club, season and competition
Club	Season	League			FA Cup		League Cup		Other		Total	
Club	Season	Division	Apps	Goals	Apps	Goals	Apps	Goals	Apps	Goals	Apps	Goals
Crystal Palace	2008–09	Championship	4	0	0	0	0	0	—		4	0
Crystal Palace	2009–10	Championship	0	0	2	0	0	0	—		2	0
Crystal Palace	Crystal Palace total		4	0	2	0	0	0	0	0	6	0
Canvey Island	2011–12	Isthmian League Premier Division	8	0	0	0	—		1	0	9	0
St Albans City	2011–12	SFL Premier Division	6	0	0	0	—		0	0	6	0
Kettering Town	2012–13	SFL Premier Division	0	0	0	0	—		0	0	0	0
St Albans City	2012–13	SFL Premier Division	21	3	0	0	—		1 (Note: Appearance in the Hertfordshire Senior Cup)	0	22	3
St Albans City	2013–14	SFL Premier Division	39	6	5	0	—		11 (Note: One appearance in the Herts Charity Cup; five appearances and a goal in the FA Trophy; three appearances in the Hertfordshire Senior Cup; two appearances and a goal in the SFL Premier Division play-offs)	2	55	8
St Albans City	2014–15	Conference South	30	3	3	0	—		6 (Note: One appearance in the Herts Charity Cup, two in the FA Trophy and three in the Hertfordshire Senior Cup)	0	39	3
St Albans City	2015–16	National League South	24	0	4	0	—		2 (Note: One appearance in the FA Trophy; one appearance and a goal in the Hertfordshire Senior Cup)	1	30	1
St Albans City	St Albans total		114	12	12	0	0	0	20	3	146	15
Maidenhead United (loan)	2015–16	National League South	16	0	—		—		0	0	16	0
Maidenhead United	2016–17	National League South	37	0	1	0	—		1 (Note: One appearance in the Berks & Bucks Senior Cup)	0	38	0
Maidenhead United	2017–18	National League	32	1	2	0	—		4 (Note: Three appearances in the FA Trophy; one appearance in the Berks & Bucks Senior Cup)	0	37	1
Maidenhead United	2018–19	National League	38	0	3	0	—		1 (Note: One appearance in the FA Trophy)	0	42	0
Maidenhead United	2019–20	National League	26	0	3	0	—		4 (Note: Three appearances in the FA Trophy; one appearance in the Berks & Bucks Senior Cup)	0	33	0
Maidenhead United	2020–21	National League	28	1	0	0	—		0	0	28	1
Maidenhead United	Maidenhead total		177	2	9	0	0	0	10	0	196	2
Walton Casuals	2021–22	SFL Premier Division South	7	2	0	0	—		3 (Note: One appearance in FA Trophy, two appearances in the Southern League Cup)	0	10	2
Boreham Wood	2021–22	National League	18	0	3	0	—		0	0	21	0
Dulwich Hamlet	2022–23	National League South	11	0	0	0	—		3 (Note: Appearance(s) in London Senior Cup)	0	14	0
Hampton & Richmond Borough	2022–23	National League South	0	0	0	0	—		0	0	0	0
Career total			345	16	26	0	0	0	37	3	408	19

=== International ===
As of match played 10 June 2025

Appearances and goals by national team and year
National team	Year	Apps	Goals
Montserrat	2015	2	0
Montserrat	2018	3	0
Montserrat	2019	5	1
Montserrat	2021	5	0
Montserrat	2022	3	0
Montserrat	2023	4	0
Montserrat	2024	1	0
Montserrat	2025	2	0
Total		25	1

=== International goals ===
Scores and results list Montserrat's goal tally first.

No.	Date	Venue	Opponent	Score	Result	Competition
1.	7 September 2019	Blakes Estate Stadium, Look Out, Montserrat	Dominican Republic	1–1	2–1	2019–20 CONCACAF Nations League B
