= Ashley-Paul Robinson =

English footballer

Personal information
- Full name: Ashley-Paul Emmanuel Robinson
- Date of birth: 5 December 1989 (age 36)
- Place of birth: England
- Height: 1.80 m (5 ft 11 in)
- Position: Midfielder

Team information
- Current team: AFC Whyteleafe

Youth career
- 2004–2008: Crystal Palace

Senior career*
Years	Team	Apps	(Gls)
2007–2008	Crystal Palace	6	(0)
2008–2009	Bromley	27	(1)
2009	Harlow	7	(2)
2009–2010	Dulwich Hamlet	8	(1)
2010	Chipstead	2	(0)
2010–2011	Eastbourne Town	20	(7)
2011	Horsham YMCA	2	(2)
2011	Horsham	4	(1)
2011	Tooting & Mitcham	9	(2)
2011–2014	Bognor Regis Town	18	(10)
2016–2017	Tooting & Mitcham	25	(2)
2018–2019	Whyteleafe		
2021–2022	South Park		
2022	Croydon	8	(0)
2022–2024	AFC Whyteleafe	9	(3)
2024–	Rising Ballers Kensington		
- * Club domestic league appearances and goals as of 4 Feb 2023

Ashley-Paul Emmanuel Robinson (born 5 December 1989) is an English footballer who plays for AFC Whyteleafe. He lives in New Addington, Croydon and attended Kelsey Park Sports College, Beckenham.

== Starting out ==
He joined the Crystal Palace academy at the age of 14, and played on the right wing or in attack. He made his debut for the Eagles in March near the back-end of the 2007-08 season, making six substitute appearances for Neil Warnock's side, which included one assist in the Colchester United game in 2008.

== Trials ==
Robinson then secured a trial with Premier League side Fulham.

After this he had other trials at League One sides Hereford United and Carlisle United. They both decided not to sign him and instead he eventually signed for Bromley on 15 October 2008.

In the 2009–10 season he played for various clubs: Harlow Town, Concord Rangers and Dulwich Hamlet.

In the 2010–11 season he played for Eastbourne Town, Hastings United, Horsham FC and Tooting & Mitcham F.C.

In June 2014, Robinson re-signed for Dulwich Hamlet - however, after playing in several pre-season friendlies, Robinson didn't make the match-day squad for the first two games of the season, and it was subsequently announced he had been released by Dulwich Hamlet, and re-signed with Tooting & Mitcham.

Following a brief spell with Tooting & Mitcham, Robinson moved on to Bognor Regis, and then Hastings United.

In 2024 he was brought in to YouTube and step 6 side Rising Ballers Kensington in order to add more experience to a young squad.

== Club career statistics ==
(correct as of 15 October 2008)

Club	Season	League		Cup		Europe		Total	
Club	Season	Apps	Goals	Apps	Goals	Apps	Goals	Apps	Goals
Crystal Palace	2007-08	6	0	0	0	-	-	6	0
Career totals		6	0	0	0	-	-	6	0
