= Ben Kudjodji =

English footballer (born 1989)

Personal information
- Full name: Ebenezer Joseph Tettley Kudjodji
- Date of birth: 23 April 1989 (age 37)
- Place of birth: Dunstable, England
- Height: 6 ft 0 in (1.83 m)
- Position: Striker

Youth career
- Crystal Palace

Senior career*
Years	Team	Apps	(Gls)
2007–2008	Crystal Palace	1	(0)
2008	Bromley	1	(0)
2008	Croydon Athletic	1	(0)
2013	Sutton United	0	(0)
201?–	Carshalton Athletic		
- * Club domestic league appearances and goals

Ebenezer Joseph Tettley "Ben" Kudjodji (born 23 April 1989) is an English footballer who plays as a striker.

== Career ==
Kudjodji was a graduate of the Crystal Palace academy. He made one appearance for the Eagles in their 2–0 victory over Barnsley in the Championship on 15 March 2008, replacing Clinton Morrison as a substitute in the 89th minute. Crystal Palace manager Neil Warnock described Kudjodji as "a smashing lad and deserved his opportunity in the team, but he couldn't sustain the level that saw earn his debut." He was released from Crystal Palace in May 2008, along with Mark Kennedy and Moses Swaibu.

Kudjodji went on to play for Bromley in the Conference South, making his only appearance in the 2–0 loss against Braintree Town before being substituted in the 46th minute for Nic McDonnell. He then left to join Croydon Athletic, again only playing one match in their 3–2 defeat at home to Sittingbourne, before walking out on the club. In 2008, Kudjodji had unsuccessful trials with Brentford and Cheltenham Town.

== Conviction ==
He was sentenced to six years imprisonment in January 2019 for dealing drugs.
