= Victor Moses =

Nigerian footballer (born 1990)

Victor Moses MON
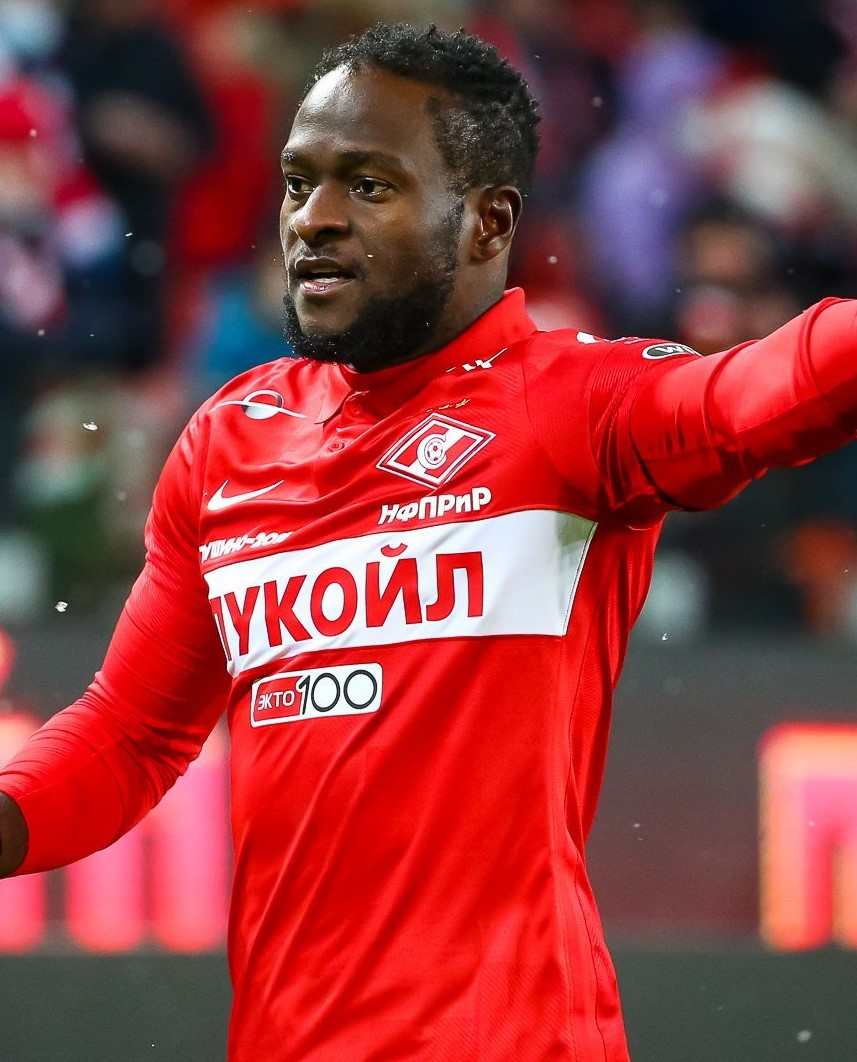
- Moses playing for Spartak Moscow in 2021

Personal information
- Full name: Victor Moses
- Date of birth: 12 December 1990 (age 35)
- Place of birth: Kaduna, Nigeria
- Height: 1.77 m (5 ft 10 in)
- Positions: Winger; wing-back

Team information
- Current team: Kaisar
- Number: 11

Youth career
- 2002–2007: Crystal Palace

Senior career*
Years	Team	Apps	(Gls)
2007–2010	Crystal Palace	58	(11)
2010–2012	Wigan Athletic	74	(8)
2012–2021	Chelsea	87	(7)
2013–2014	→ Liverpool (loan)	19	(1)
2014–2015	→ Stoke City (loan)	19	(3)
2015–2016	→ West Ham United (loan)	21	(1)
2019–2020	→ Fenerbahçe (loan)	20	(5)
2020	→ Inter Milan (loan)	12	(0)
2020–2021	→ Spartak Moscow (loan)	19	(4)
2021–2024	Spartak Moscow	51	(5)
2024–2025	Luton Town	18	(1)
2026–	Kaisar	17	(2)

International career
2005	England U16	1	(0)
2006–2007	England U17	15	(9)
2008–2009	England U19	12	(2)
2010	England U21	1	(0)
2012–2018	Nigeria	38	(12)
Medal record
Representing Nigeria
Men's football
Africa Cup of Nations
Winner	2013 South Africa
- * Club domestic league appearances and goals as of 19:04, 3 November 2026 (UTC)

Victor Moses MON (born 12 December 1990) is a Nigerian professional footballer who plays as a winger for Kazakhstan Premier League club Kaisar. He has also been deployed as a wing-back at times during his career.

Moses began his career in the Championship with Crystal Palace, before his performances caught the eye of Wigan Athletic, where he made his Premier League debut in 2010. After two years, his game had improved to the extent that European champions Chelsea were interested, and he signed for them in the summer of 2012. Despite ten goals in all competitions during his first season, he spent his second season on loan to Liverpool, his third on loan at Stoke City and his fourth on loan at West Ham United. Moses was recalled to Chelsea for the 2016–17 season where he made 34 appearances as Chelsea won the Premier League. After failing to impress during the next campaign, Moses spent subsequent loan spells with Fenerbahçe, Inter Milan and Spartak Moscow in the following seasons.

Born in Nigeria, Moses represented England youth teams at under-16, under-17, under-19 and under-21 levels, but opted to play for Nigeria as opposed to being fully capped for England. He made his debut for the Nigerian senior team in 2012 and earned 38 caps and scored 12 times before retiring from international matches in 2018. He played in Nigeria's winning campaign at the 2013 Africa Cup of Nations, as well as the campaign in the 2014 FIFA World Cup and the 2018 FIFA World Cup.

== Club career ==
=== Early life and career ===
Moses was born in Kaduna, Nigeria to the son of a Christian pastor. When he was 11, Moses’ parents were killed in the city’s religious riots during a home invasion. He was playing football in the street at the time. A week later, after being hidden by friends, Moses’ relatives paid for him to travel to the UK to claim asylum. He was placed with a foster family in South London. Moses attended Stanley Technical High School (now known as the Harris Academy) in South Norwood. Whilst playing football in the local Tandridge League for Cosmos 90 FC, Moses was scouted by Crystal Palace. The club's Selhurst Park stadium was just streets away from his school.

Offered a place in the Eagles' academy, Palace recommended Moses to the fee-paying Whitgift School in Croydon, where former Arsenal and Chelsea star Colin Pates was coaching the school football team. Moses first came to prominence at 14 after scoring 50 goals for Palace's under-14s side. Playing for three years at both Whitgift and Palace, Moses scored over 100 goals as well as helping Whitgift win many School Cups, including a National Cup where Moses scored all five goals in the final against Healing School of Grimsby at the Walkers Stadium, Leicester.

=== Crystal Palace ===
Moses made his first team debut for Palace at the age of 16 on 6 November 2007 in a 1–1 draw with Cardiff City in the Championship. He kept his place in the side thereafter and scored his first senior goal on 12 March 2008 in a 1–1 draw with West Bromwich Albion. In total, Moses played 16 times in 2007–08 as Palace reached the Championship play-offs where they lost out to Bristol City. At the end of the season, he signed a new contract at Selhurst Park, much to delight of manager Neil Warnock, who stated, "Victor signing is a huge coup for the club; I've told Victor he could go as high as he wants. He's improving every day and I am delighted that he has signed this deal as he is a player who will go from strength to strength."

Moses score twice in 32 appearances in 2008–09 as Palace had a disappointing campaign, finishing in 15th position. In 2009–10, Moses went on a run of six goals in eight matches but Palace were suffering huge financial problems and the club went into administration in January 2010.

=== Wigan Athletic ===
On the final day of January 2010, he completed a £2.5 million transfer to Premier League side Wigan Athletic after Palace went into administration. He made his debut on 6 February 2010 as a substitute against Sunderland in a 1–1 draw. On 20 March 2010, Moses came on as a substitute against Burnley and got his first assist for the club, setting up Hugo Rodallega for an injury time winner. He scored his first goal for Wigan on 3 May 2010 against Hull City.

Moses picked up two injuries at the start of the 2010–11 season, and found it difficult to make it back into the first-team due to increased competition for places. He scored his first league goal of the season on 13 November 2010 in a 1–0 win against West Bromwich Albion.

Following the departure of winger Charles N'Zogbia, Moses became a regular starter for Wigan in the 2011–12 season. On 10 December 2011, he scored his first goal of the season against West Brom – his first goal since scoring against the same team the previous season.

=== Chelsea ===
==== 2012–13 season ====
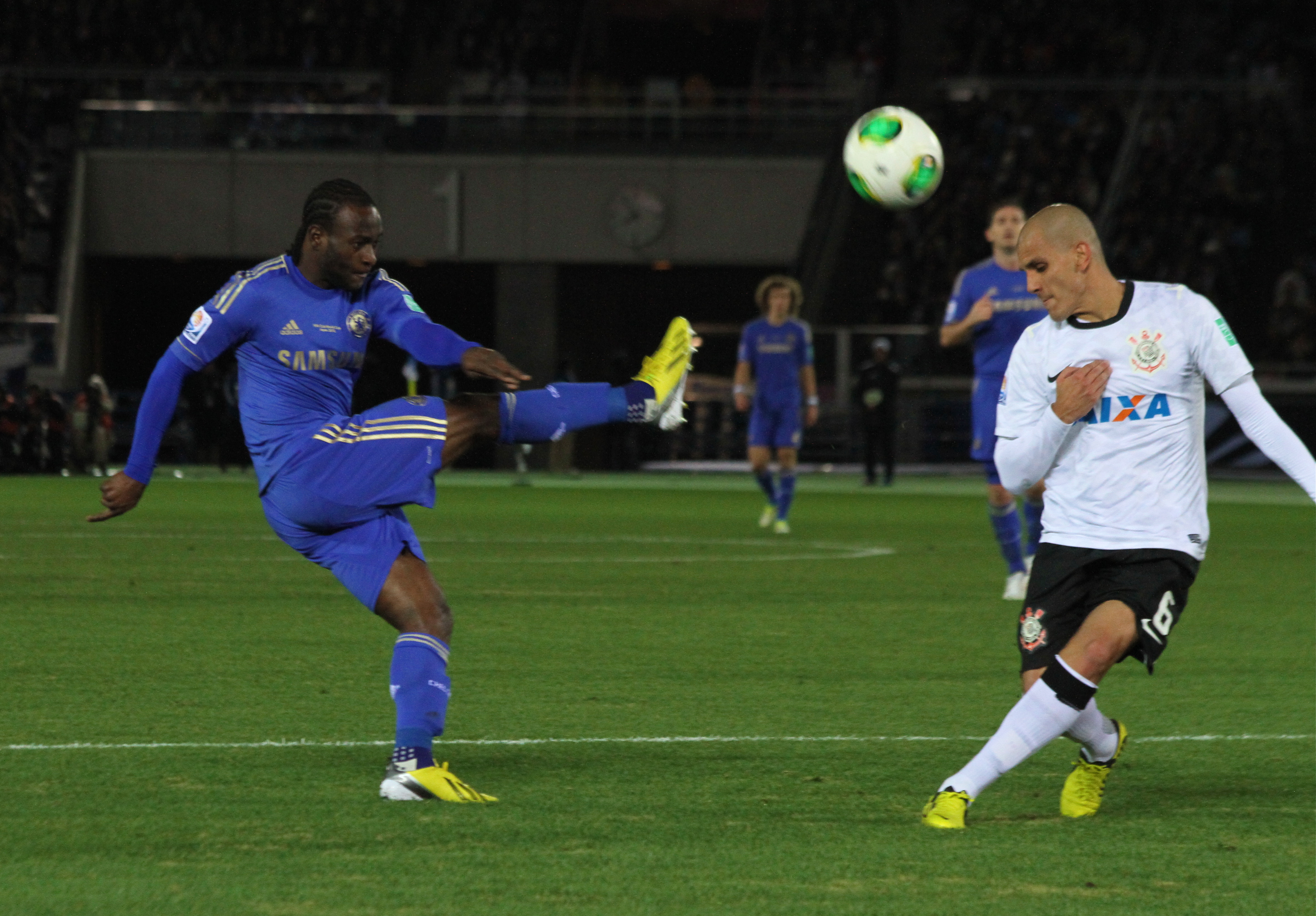
Moses and Fábio Santos of Corinthians in the 2012 FIFA Club World Cup Final

On 23 August 2012, Wigan accepted a fifth bid from Chelsea after they finally met Wigan's asking price after four previously unsuccessful bids. The player was given permission to speak with Chelsea. On 24 August, Chelsea announced that the transfer of Moses had been completed. Moses played his first game for Chelsea when he appeared as a substitute against West London rivals Queens Park Rangers on 15 September.

Moses made his full debut for Chelsea when he started the League Cup game against Wolverhampton Wanderers and scored his first goal after 71 minutes in a game that finished 6–0 to the Blues. Moses started his first Champions League game against Nordsjælland. On 31 October, Moses was named Man of the Match against Manchester United in the League Cup, a game Chelsea won 5–4.

On 3 November 2012, Moses scored his first Premier League goal for Chelsea in the match against Swansea City, which ended in a 1–1 draw. Four days later, he scored his first Champions League goal for Chelsea against Shakhtar Donetsk; Moses replaced Oscar in the 79th minute and went on to head in Juan Mata's corner with seconds left to secure a 3–2 win. On 5 January 2013, Moses opened his scoring tally for the year with a powerful drive into the bottom corner whilst playing in the FA Cup Third round against Southampton, as Chelsea came from 1–0 behind to beat the Saints 1–5.

Moses scored his first Europa League goal for Chelsea in a 3–1 home win against Rubin Kazan, and then his second in the reverse fixture a week later. He continued his fine form in the competition by scoring his side's first goal in the 1–2 away win at Basel on 25 April. He also scored in the reverse match against Basel when the Blues won 3–1 at home and secured their participation in the Europa League Final, a match in which Moses did not feature but the Blues nonetheless won 2–1 against Benfica in Amsterdam on 15 May.

==== 2013–14 season: Loan to Liverpool ====
On 2 September 2013, Moses signed for Liverpool on a season-long loan deal. He scored on his debut on 16 September against Swansea City in a 2–2 draw. On 25 January 2014, he scored the first goal of a 2–0 victory against AFC Bournemouth in the fourth round of the FA Cup. Due to the form of Raheem Sterling during the 2013–14 season, Moses found opportunities hard to come by under Brendan Rodgers, playing 22 games of which only nine were starts.

==== 2014–15 season: Loan to Stoke City ====
On 16 August 2014, Moses joined Stoke City on loan for the 2014–15 season. He made his Premier League debut for Stoke City on 30 August in a 1–0 win away at Manchester City. In Stoke's 1–0 win over Newcastle United on 29 September, Moses provided the assist for the lone goal scored by Peter Crouch and was voted Man of the Match for his performance. On 19 October, in a 2–1 win against Swansea City, Moses won a penalty after going down under a challenge from Àngel Rangel; after the match, Swansea manager Garry Monk claimed that Moses dived. Match of the Day 2 pundit John Hartson also claimed Moses had cheated, but later apologised to Moses for his comments. Moses scored his first goal for Stoke on 1 November in a 2–2 draw with West Ham United. He suffered a thigh injury against Burnley on 22 November which ruled him out for eight weeks. On 17 January 2015, Moses returned to the starting line-up against Leicester City, which ended in a 1–0 win for Stoke. On 21 February, Moses scored a 90th-minute penalty to earn Stoke a 2–1 victory over Midlands rivals Aston Villa at Villa Park. He also scored in a 2–0 victory over Everton on 4 March.

With André Schürrle and Mohamed Salah leaving on a permanent basis and on loan, respectively, it was announced that Chelsea manager José Mourinho attempted to recall Moses back from Stoke mid-season, only for the winger to reject the move back. Moses suffered a hamstring injury whilst playing against West Ham on 11 April, which ruled him out for the rest of the season.

==== 2015–16 season: Loan to West Ham United ====
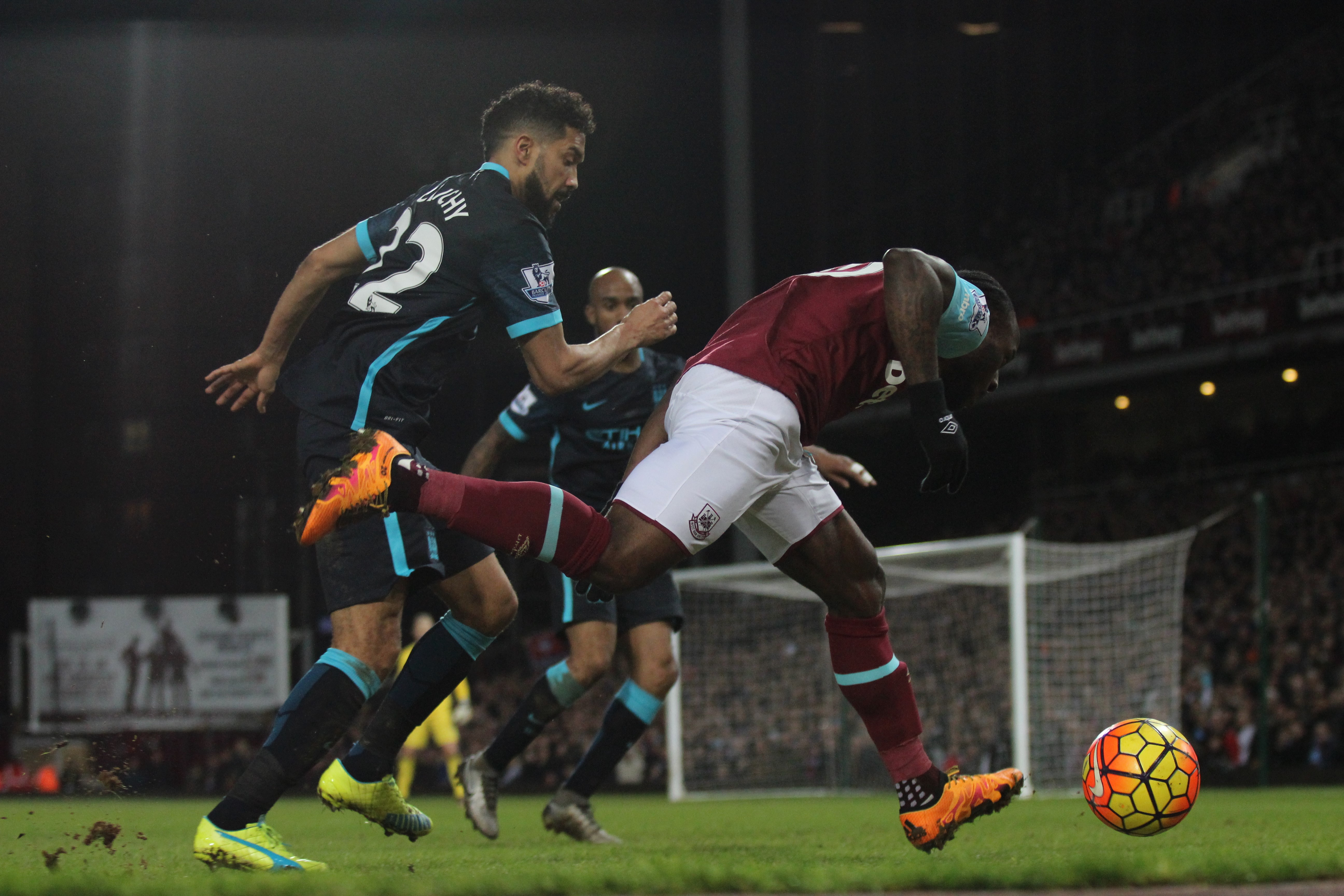
Moses on the ball during his loan spell with West Ham United, playing against Manchester City in 2016

After a successful season on loan with Stoke, Moses returned to the Blues and made appearances in all four of the preseason games and scored once, against Paris Saint-Germain F.C. Moses made his first competitive appearance since the return on 2 August 2015 against Arsenal for the Community Shield when he replaced John Terry in the 82nd minute. The match ended with Chelsea losing 1–0. Moses was also included on the bench during the first game of the season against Swansea City, although he did not make an appearance as Chelsea drew 2–2.

On 1 September 2015, Moses joined West Ham United on a season-long loan. Before joining West Ham United on loan, Moses signed a new four-year contract, which will keep him at Chelsea until 2019. Moses made his West Ham debut on 14 September in a 2–0 home win against Newcastle United, where he was named Man of the Match. In his second game, on 19 September away against Manchester City, Moses scored his only West Ham goal, in a 1–2 win. On 5 December, during the match against Manchester United, Moses suffered a hamstring injury that ruled him out until February.

In April, it was revealed that the loan deal also had an option to make the move permanent at the end of the season, but West Ham decided to turn down the option.

==== 2016–18: Return to Chelsea ====
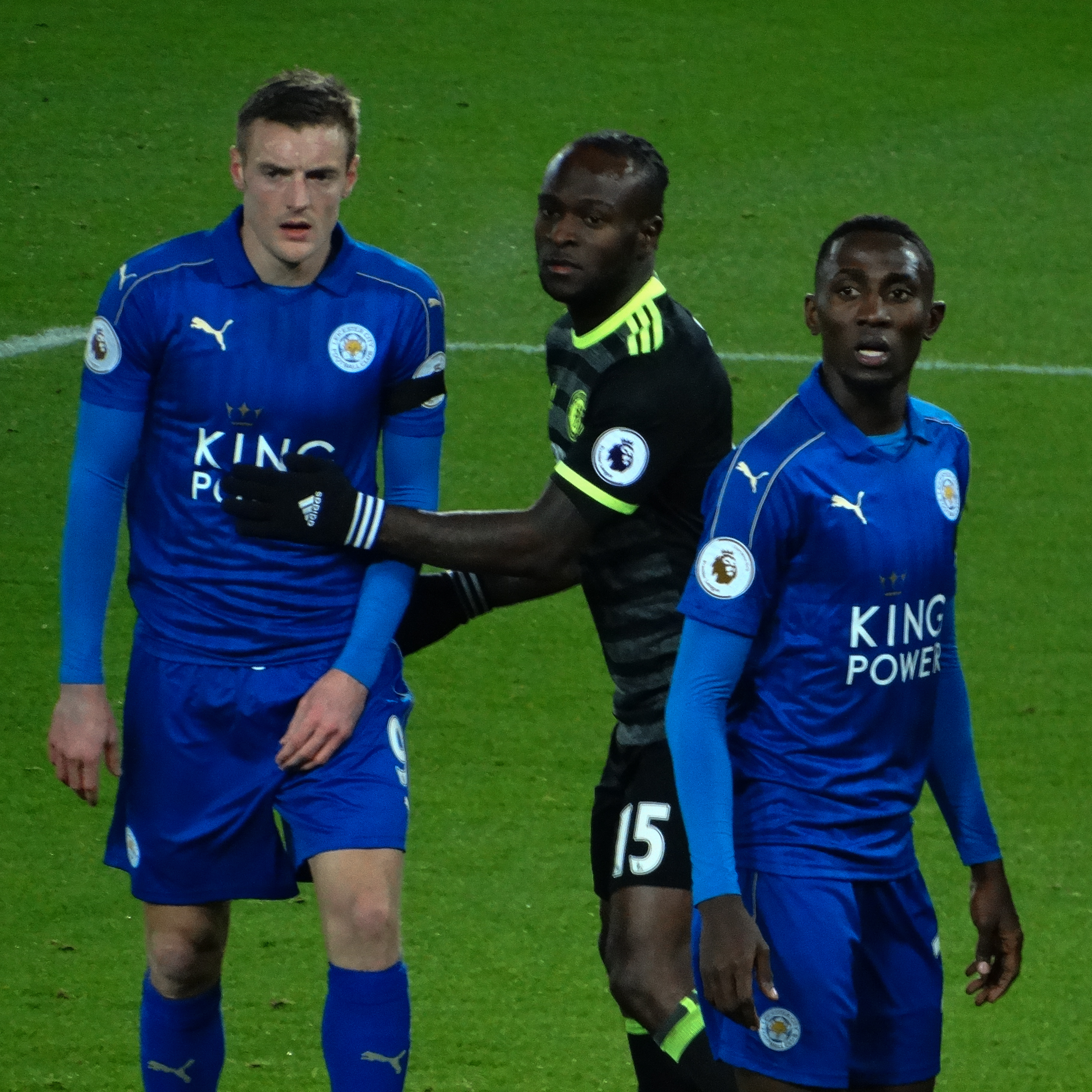
Moses (centre) with national teammate Wilfred Ndidi (right) playing for Chelsea against champions Leicester City, 2017

After impressing new manager Antonio Conte during preseason, Moses was included in the first-team squad. On 15 August 2016, Moses played his first league game for Chelsea in three years, coming off the bench for Eden Hazard against West Ham United in a 2–1 win. On 23 August, Moses made his first start and scored his first goal since his return, in the Second round of the EFL Cup against Bristol Rovers in a 3–2 victory.

After back to back league defeats, Conte converted into a 3–4–3 formation with Moses playing as a right-sided wing-back in the following match against Hull City. His performance as a wing-back helped Chelsea to a 2–0 victory and also earned him the Man of the Match. On 15 October 2016, Moses scored his second league goal of the season against Leicester City in a 3–0 home win. On 26 November 2016, Moses scored the winner in a 2–1 victory against Tottenham Hotspur and was named the Man of the Match. Moses played 40 games in all competitions for Chelsea in the 2016–17 season, scoring four goals. With Chelsea winning the Premier League title, Moses became the Nigerian player with the most Premier League appearances for a title winning team. Moses courted considerable controversy during the 2017 FA Cup Final against Arsenal which Chelsea lost 2–1. Having been booked for a foul on Danny Welbeck earlier, he was given a second booking, resulting in a red card, after diving in the penalty area. He became the fifth player to be sent off in an FA Cup final. The match was played five days after the Manchester Arena bombing in which 23 people, mostly children, died. Chelsea did not wear black armbands during the first half but did during the second. Then, Moses, while walking off the pitch removed his and threw it to the ground, sparking outrage on social media, with many accusing him of failing to show respect to those that lost their lives.

Moses scored the opening goal in the 2017 FA Community Shield, which Chelsea lost to rivals Arsenal on penalties.

==== 2018–19 season: Loan to Fenerbahçe ====
In January 2019, Moses signed an eighteen-month loan deal with Turkish side, Fenerbahçe. On 1 February 2019, Moses scored his first league goal of the season for Fenerbahçe in a 2–0 win against Göztepe.

==== 2019–20 season: Loan to Inter Milan ====
After the Fenerbahçe deal was cut short, Moses signed for Inter Milan on a six-month loan deal with an option to buy on 23 January 2020. He was one of three former Premier League players to join Inter Milan in the January window, alongside Ashley Young and Christian Eriksen. He made his club debut on 29 January, coming on as a second-half substitute for Antonio Candreva in 2–1 home win over Fiorentina in the Coppa Italia quarter-finals. He made his league debut a few days after, on 2 February, starting on the right in a 2–0 win at Udinese.

=== Spartak Moscow ===
On 15 October 2020, Moses joined Russian Premier League club Spartak Moscow on a season-long loan with an option to buy. Two days later on 17 October, he made his club debut from the bench in a 3–2 away win against Khimki. On 24 October, he made his first appearance as a starter and scored his first goal for Spartak in a 3–1 away win against Krasnodar. On 16 May 2021, he scored a late equalizer in the last 2020–21 Russian Premier League game against FC Akhmat Grozny to establish the final score of 2–2. The point that Spartak gained secured the 2nd place and Champions League qualification round entry for the club.

On 2 July 2021, Chelsea confirmed that Moses had completed a permanent transfer to Spartak Moscow, ending his nine-year association with the club. Spartak announced on the same day that he signed a two-year contract with the club. On 10 February 2022, Moses extended his contract with Spartak to 2024. Moses won the 2021-22 Russian Cup with his club on 29 May in a 2–1 Old Russian Derby victory over Dynamo Moscow.

On 23 July 2023, Moses scored the opening goal of Spartak's season on the 45th minute, with the home match against FC Orenburg ultimately finishing 3–2.

On 19 May 2024, it was announced that Moses would leave Spartak at the end of the season when his contract expired.

=== Luton Town ===
On 10 September 2024, Luton Town confirmed that Moses had signed for them. He made his debut for the Hatters on 21 September, coming on as a substitute in the 83rd minute in a 2–1 home win against Sheffield Wednesday. Six days later, Moses scored his first goal for Luton Town in a 1–3 away loss to Plymouth Argyle.

On 9 May 2025, the club announced Moses would be released in June when his contract expires.

=== Kaisar ===
On 24 January 2026, Kazakhstan Premier League club Kaisar announced the signing of Moses.

== International career ==
=== England ===
==== U16 and U17 level ====
Despite originally hailing from Kaduna, Nigeria, Moses initially chose to represent his adopted home of England, featuring for the under-16 team, in which he won the Victory Shield in 2005, and under-17 level. He travelled with the squad to the 2007 UEFA European U-17 Championship in Belgium, scoring three times (including the only goal in the semi-final win over France) to help John Peacock's side to the competition final, where they were narrowly beaten by a single goal by Spain, though Moses managed to finish as the competition's top scorer and collect the Golden Boot for doing so.

That same summer, the squad travelled to South Korea for the FIFA U-17 World Cup. Moses finished as the Young Lions' top scorer, netting three times in the Group B fixtures, but sustained an injury in the victory over Brazil that ruled him out of the competition. Moses' teammates went on to reach the quarterfinal stage.

==== U19s ====
Following that tournament, Moses was promoted to the under-18 squad, and following his goalscoring exploits for Crystal Palace's first-team, he was promoted to the under-19 side without appearing sufficiently for the U-18s to actually collect a cap. He went with the U-19s to the 2008 UEFA European U-19 Championship in the Czech Republic, playing two matches and picking up one assist as the Young Lions failed to make it out of Group B. Speculation grew as manager Stuart Pearce snubbed him that Moses would return to play for Nigeria in the 2010 FIFA World Cup—this move never materialised.

==== U21s ====
Moses was promoted to the under-21 squad at the beginning of the 2010–11 season and made his debut against Uzbekistan in a 2–0 win.

=== Nigeria ===
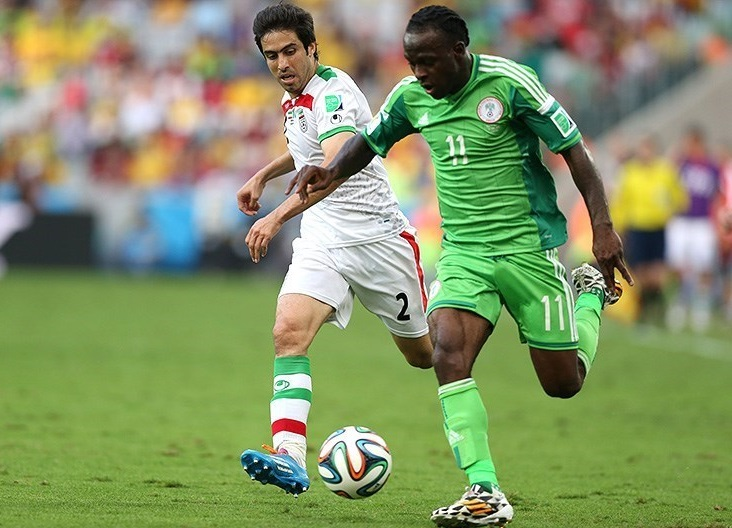
Moses playing for Nigeria against Iran at the 2014 FIFA World Cup.

Moses was selected to play for Nigeria against Guatemala in February 2011, but the friendly was cancelled. He then accepted a call-up in March 2011 for Nigeria's games against Ethiopia and Kenya. However, he was ruled out of those games because his application to FIFA to switch nationalities was not received in time. It was announced on 1 November 2011 that FIFA had cleared both Moses and Shola Ameobi to play for Nigeria. Moses was called up to Nigeria's 23-man squad for the 2013 Africa Cup of Nations, scoring two penalties in their final group stage game against Ethiopia, which Nigeria needed to win to go through. For the second, Ethiopian goalkeeper Sisay Bancha was given his second booking in the events leading to the penalty and was sent off. Ethiopia had already used all three substitutes so their holding midfielder went in goal, and missed Moses' penalty. The game ended 2–0. Nigeria went on to win the tournament, their third such title. Moses started in the final and played the entire game.

Moses was selected for Nigeria's squad for the 2014 FIFA World Cup and started in their opening group match and the Round of 16 match against France as they lost 2–0.

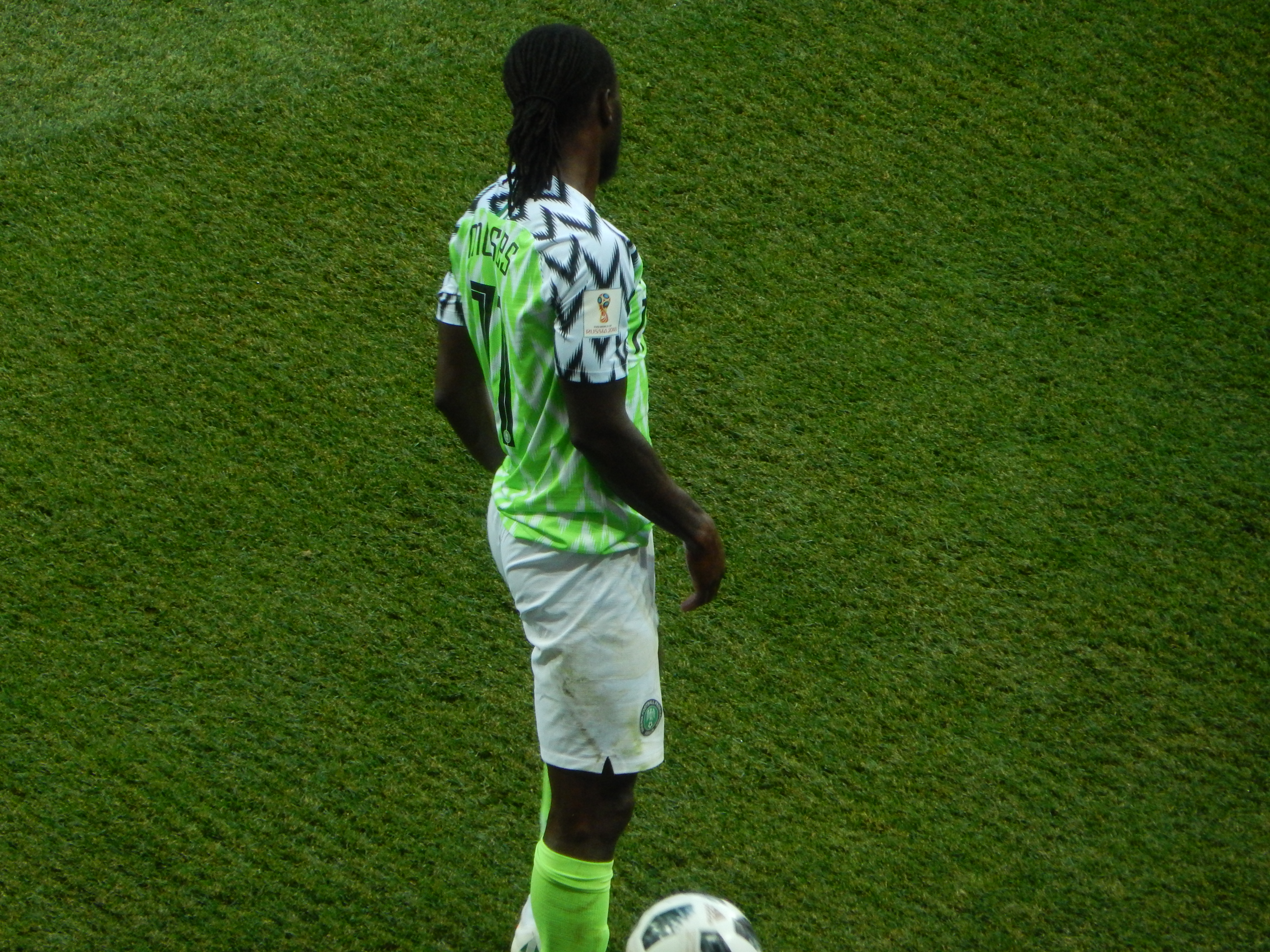
Moses taking a free kick for Nigeria during the 2018 FIFA World Cup.

Upon Gernot Rohr's assumption as Nigeria's head coach in August 2016, Moses featured regularly in the FIFA 2018 qualifying matches. Moses scored a brace for Nigeria during a FIFA 2018 qualifying match against Algeria in November 2016, helping them secure a 3–1 victory.

In May 2018 he was named in Nigeria's preliminary 30 man squad for the 2018 World Cup in Russia, where he got a crucial equalizer against Argentina, though, his side lost the game in the dying minutes to see Argentina through while Nigeria got eliminated. After the tournament, it was announced by Moses on 15 August that he has retired from playing for Nigeria at international football.

== Personal life ==
Moses grew up supporting Arsenal. He has a son, Brentley, (born 2012) and a daughter, Nyah, (born 2015).

== Career statistics ==
=== Club ===
As of match played 31 October 2026

Appearances and goals by club, season and competition
Club	Season	League			National cup (Note: Includes FA Cup, Turkish Cup, Coppa Italia, Russian Cup, Kazakhstan Cup)		League cup (Note: Includes Football League Cup/EFL Cup)		Europe		Other		Total	
Club	Season	Division	Apps	Goals	Apps	Goals	Apps	Goals	Apps	Goals	Apps	Goals	Apps	Goals
Crystal Palace	2007–08	Championship	13	3	1	0	0	0	—		2 (Note: Appearances in Championship play-offs)	0	16	3
Crystal Palace	2008–09	Championship	27	2	3	0	2	0	—		—		32	2
Crystal Palace	2009–10	Championship	18	6	1	0	2	0	—		—		21	6
Crystal Palace	Total		58	11	5	0	4	0	—		2	0	69	11
Wigan Athletic	2009–10	Premier League	14	1	0	0	0	0	—		—		14	1
Wigan Athletic	2010–11	Premier League	21	1	2	0	3	1	—		—		26	2
Wigan Athletic	2011–12	Premier League	38	6	1	0	0	0	—		—		39	6
Wigan Athletic	2012–13	Premier League	1	0	—		—		—		—		1	0
Wigan Athletic	Total		74	8	3	0	3	1	—		—		80	9
Chelsea	2012–13	Premier League	23	1	5	2	3	2	10 (Note: Four appearances and one goal in UEFA Champions League, six appearances and four goals in UEFA Europa League)	5	2 (Note: Appearances in FIFA Club World Cup)	0	43	10
Chelsea	2015–16	Premier League	0	0	—		—		0	0	1 (Note: Appearance in FA Community Shield)	0	1	0
Chelsea	2016–17	Premier League	34	3	4	0	2	1	—		—		40	4
Chelsea	2017–18	Premier League	28	3	3	0	2	0	4 (Note: Appearances in UEFA Champions League)	0	1	1	38	4
Chelsea	2018–19	Premier League	2	0	0	0	1	0	2 (Note: Appearances in UEFA Europa League)	0	1	0	6	0
Chelsea	Total		87	7	12	2	8	3	16	5	5	1	128	18
Liverpool (loan)	2013–14	Premier League	19	1	2	1	1	0	—		—		22	2
Stoke City (loan)	2014–15	Premier League	19	3	2	1	2	0	—		—		23	4
West Ham United (loan)	2015–16	Premier League	21	1	4	1	1	0	—		—		26	2
Fenerbahçe (loan)	2018–19	Süper Lig	14	4	0	0	—		2	0	—		16	4
Fenerbahçe (loan)	2019–20	Süper Lig	6	1	1	0	—		—		—		7	1
Fenerbahçe (loan)	Total		20	5	1	0	—		2	0	—		23	5
Inter Milan (loan)	2019–20	Serie A	12	0	3	0	—		5	0	—		20	0
Spartak Moscow (loan)	2020–21	Russian Premier League	19	4	1	0	—		—		—		20	4
Spartak Moscow	2021–22	Russian Premier League	25	2	2	0	—		7 (Note: One appearance in UEFA Champions League, six appearances and one goal in UEFA Europa League)	1	—		34	3
Spartak Moscow	2022–23	Russian Premier League	10	2	0	0	—		—		—		10	2
Spartak Moscow	2023–24	Russian Premier League	16	1	3	0	—		—		—		19	1
Spartak Moscow	Total		51	5	5	0	—		7	1	—		63	6
Luton Town	2024–25	Championship	18	1	0	0	—		—		—		18	1
Kaisar	2026	Kazakhstan Premier League	17	2	3	1	—		—		—		20	3
Career total			415	48	41	6	19	4	30	6	7	1	512	65

=== International ===
As of match played 26 June 2018

Appearances and goals by national team and year
National team	Year	Apps	Goals
Nigeria	2012	6	2
Nigeria	2013	11	4
Nigeria	2014	6	1
Nigeria	2015	0	0
Nigeria	2016	4	2
Nigeria	2017	3	1
Nigeria	2018	7	2
Total		37	12

Scores and results list Nigeria's goal tally first, score column indicates score after each Moses goal.

List of international goals scored by Victor Moses
No.	Date	Venue	Opponent	Score	Result	Competition
1	13 October 2012	U. J. Esuene Stadium, Calabar, Nigeria	Liberia	3–0	6–1	2013 Africa Cup of Nations qualification
2	13 October 2012	U. J. Esuene Stadium, Calabar, Nigeria	Liberia	6–1	6–1	2013 Africa Cup of Nations qualification
3	29 January 2013	Royal Bafokeng Stadium, Rustenburg, South Africa	Ethiopia	1–0	2–0	2013 Africa Cup of Nations
4	29 January 2013	Royal Bafokeng Stadium, Rustenburg, South Africa	Ethiopia	2–0	2–0	2013 Africa Cup of Nations
5	7 September 2013	U.J. Esuene Stadium, Calabar, Nigeria	Malawi	2–0	2–0	2014 FIFA World Cup qualification
6	16 November 2013	U.J. Esuene Stadium, Calabar, Nigeria	Ethiopia	1–0	2–0	2014 FIFA World Cup qualification
7	7 June 2014	EverBank Field, Jacksonville, United States	United States	1–2	1–2	Friendly
8	12 November 2016	Godswill Akpabio International Stadium, Uyo, Nigeria	Algeria	1–0	3–1	2018 FIFA World Cup qualification
9	12 November 2016	Godswill Akpabio International Stadium, Uyo, Nigeria	Algeria	3–1	3–1	2018 FIFA World Cup qualification
10	1 September 2017	Godswill Akpabio International Stadium, Uyo, Nigeria	Cameroon	3–0	4–0	2018 FIFA World Cup qualification
11	23 March 2018	Stadion Miejski, Wrocław, Poland	Poland	1–0	1–0	Friendly
12	26 June 2018	Krestovsky Stadium, Saint Petersburg, Russia	Argentina	1–1	1–2	2018 FIFA World Cup

== Honours ==
Chelsea

- Premier League: 2016–17
- FA Cup: 2017–18; runner-up: 2016–17
- UEFA Europa League: 2012–13, 2018–19
- FIFA Club World Cup runner-up: 2012

Inter Milan

- UEFA Europa League runner-up: 2019–20

Spartak Moscow

- Russian Cup: 2021–22

Nigeria

- Africa Cup of Nations: 2013

Individual

- PFA Fans' Premier League Player of the Month: November 2016
- Africa Cup of Nations Team of the Tournament: 2013
- Africa Cup of Nations Fair Player of the Tournament: 2013
- UEFA European Under-17 Championship Top Scorer: 2007
- EFL Young Player of the Month: December 2009

Orders

- Member of the Order of the Niger
