= Simon Thomas (footballer) =

English footballer

Personal information
- Full name: Simon Vaughn Thomas
- Date of birth: 21 July 1984 (age 42)
- Place of birth: Stratford, England
- Height: 6 ft 2 in (1.88 m)
- Position: Forward

Senior career*
Years	Team	Apps	(Gls)
2003–2004	Thurrock		
2004–2005	Aveley		
2005–2006	Wivenhoe Town	52	(19)
2006	Redbridge	4	(1)
2006–2008	Boreham Wood	65	(21)
2008–2010	Crystal Palace	1	(0)
2008–2009	→ Grays Athletic (loan)	8	(1)
2009	→ Rotherham United (loan)	2	(0)
2009	→ Ebbsfleet United (loan)	6	(1)
2009–2010	→ Darlington (loan)	7	(1)
2010	Billericay Town		(?)
2010	Chelmsford City	3	(0)
2010–2011	Grays Athletic	35	(12)
2011–2013	Chesham United	81	(38)
2013	Canvey Island	14	(2)
2013–2014	St Neots Town	20	(3)
2014–2015	Chesham United	37	(13)
2015	St Neots Town	16	(4)
2015	Needham Market	3	(0)
2015–2016	Tonbridge Angels	4	(1)
2016	Royston Town	18	(10)
2016	VCD Athletic	1	(0)
2016–2017	Royston Town	10	(0)
2017	Canvey Island		
2017–2018	Enfield Town		
2018	Great Wakering Rovers		
- * Club domestic league appearances and goals

Simon Vaughn Thomas (born 21 July 1984) is an English former footballer who played as a forward.

== Career ==
Thomas spent two years at Boreham Wood, helping them to avoid relegation. Following this he turned professional, signing with Crystal Palace for a small fee. During his first season at Palace, Thomas moved to Conference National side Grays Athletic on loan, and scored the equaliser in the 1–1 home draw against Weymouth. In February 2009, Thomas moved to Rotherham United on a one-month loan deal. The following season began with a loan spell back in the Conference, this time at Ebbsfleet United, where he scored a late winner at Eastbourne Borough.

On 16 October 2009, he joined Darlington on a three-month loan deal, making his debut on 17 October and scoring a goal in a 2–1 home win against Shrewsbury Town. He was released from Crystal Palace in early January 2010, and signed for Isthmian League Premier Division club Billericay Town on 21 January. On 3 February 2010, Thomas played for Colchester United Reserves in a game which he scored two goals in a 5–1 win against Southend United Reserves.

Thomas rejoined Grays Athletic in the Isthmian League Division One North at the start of the 2010–11 season. He made 35 appearances scoring 12 goals for Grays, before being released on 8 April 2011. He went on to join Chesham United in July 2011, ahead of the 2011–12 season and scored 43 goals in 92 matches for the Generals before moving to Canvey Island ahead of the 2013–14 season.

He subsequently played for St Neots Town (2013–2014), Chesham United (2014–2015), St Neots Town again (2015), Needham Market (2015), Tonbridge Angels (2015–2016), Royston Town (2016) and VCD Athletic (2016) before returning to Royston Town and then Canvey Island.
