= 2005–06 Fulham F.C. season =

Fulham F.C.
2005–06 season
- Manager: Chris Coleman
- Stadium: Craven Cottage
- Premier League: 12th
- FA Cup: Third round
- League Cup: Third round
- Top goalscorer: League: Collins John (11); All: Collins John (12)
Home colours	Away colours	Third colours

The 2005–06 season was Fulham's fifth consecutive season in the top flight of English football, the Premier League.

== Season summary ==
Fulham were again managed by Chris Coleman and they managed to achieve a 12th-place finish in the Premier League, one place higher than the previous season. Their best results of the season were home wins against Chelsea (1–0) and Liverpool (2–0).

In the League Cup, they reached the third round by winning an exciting game against Lincoln City 5–4 after extra time, but they then succumbed to West Bromwich Albion. In the FA Cup, they fell at the first hurdle with a humiliating 2–1 home defeat to Leyton Orient.

== Players ==
=== First-team squad ===
Squad at end of season

Note: Flags indicate national team as defined under FIFA eligibility rules; some limited exceptions apply. Players may hold more than one non-FIFA nationality.

No.	Pos.	Nation	Player
1	GK	WAL	Mark Crossley (Note: Crossley was born in Barnsley, England, and represented them at U-21 level, but also qualified to represent Wales internationally through a grandparent and made his international debut for Wales in February 1997.)
2	DF	GER	Moritz Volz
3	DF	USA	Carlos Bocanegra
4	MF	FRA	Steed Malbranque (Note: Malbranque was born in Mouscron, Belgium, but also qualified to represent France internationally and represented them at U-21 level before being called up by France in February 2004 without playing.)
5	MF	FRA	Sylvain Legwinski
6	DF	ENG	Zat Knight
7	MF	WAL	Mark Pembridge
8	MF	DEN	Claus Jensen
9	MF	ENG	Michael Brown
10	FW	ISL	Heiðar Helguson
11	FW	POR	Luís Boa Morte
13	FW	CAN	Tomasz Radzinski (Note: Radzinski was born in Poznań, Poland, but also qualified to represent Canada internationally and made his international debut for Canada in June 1995.)
14	MF	SEN	Papa Bouba Diop
15	FW	NED	Collins John (Note: John was born in Zwedru, Liberia, but was raised in the Netherlands and made his international debut for the Netherlands in August 2004.)

No.	Pos.	Nation	Player
16	GK	POR	Ricardo Batista
17	DF	ENG	Liam Rosenior
18	MF	AUS	Ahmad Elrich
19	DF	FRA	Philippe Christanval
20	FW	USA	Brian McBride
22	DF	ENG	Dean Leacock
23	MF	IRL	Michael Timlin (Note: Timlin was born in Peckham, England, but also qualified to represent the Republic of Ireland internationally and represented them at U-17 and U-21 level.)
24	DF	FRA	Alain Goma
27	MF	NZL	Simon Elliott
29	GK	FIN	Antti Niemi
30	GK	TRI	Tony Warner (Note: Warner was born in Liverpool, England, but also qualified to represent Trinidad and Tobago internationally and made his international debut for Trinidad and Tobago in February 2006.)
31	DF	ENG	Wayne Bridge (on loan from Chelsea)
33	DF	DEN	Niclas Jensen
35	DF	ENG	Ian Pearce

=== Left club during season ===
Note: Flags indicate national team as defined under FIFA eligibility rules; some limited exceptions apply. Players may hold more than one non-FIFA nationality.

No.	Pos.	Nation	Player
19	FW	GHA	Elvis Hammond (to Leicester City)
21	DF	PAK	Zesh Rehman (Note: Rehman was born in Birmingham, England, and represented them at U-18, U-19 and U-20 level, but also qualified to represent Pakistan internationally through his parents and made his international debut for Pakistan in December 2005.) (on loan to Norwich City)
25	GK	CZE	Jaroslav Drobný (on loan to ADO Den Haag)
26	DF	ENG	Adam Green (on loan to Bristol City)

No.	Pos.	Nation	Player
28	DF	ENG	Liam Fontaine (on loan to Bristol City)
31	MF	ENG	Darren Pratley (on loan to Brentford)
—	FW	FRA	Steve Marlet (to VfL Wolfsburg)
—	FW	ARG	Facundo Sava (to Lorca)

=== Reserve squad ===
Note: Flags indicate national team as defined under FIFA eligibility rules; some limited exceptions apply. Players may hold more than one non-FIFA nationality.

No.	Pos.	Nation	Player
32	MF	WAL	Matty Collins
34	MF	ENG	Neale McDermott
36	MF	ENG	Robert Milsom
—	DF	ENG	Kasali Yinka Casal
—	DF	ENG	Elliot Omozusi

No.	Pos.	Nation	Player
—	DF	ENG	TJ Moncur
—	DF	ENG	Robbie Watkins
—	MF	NZL	Chris James
—	FW	FRA	Ismael Ehui

== Transfers ==
=== Summer ===
==== In ====
Date	Pos.	Name	From	Fee
27 June 2005	FW	(Iceland) Heiðar Helguson	(England) Watford	£1,300,000
17 July 2005	DF	(Denmark) Niclas Jensen	(Germany) Borussia Dortmund	Undisclosed
11 Aug 2005	GK	(Trinidad and Tobago) Tony Warner	(Wales) Cardiff City	Six-month loan
8 Sep 2005	DF	(France) Philippe Christanval	(France) Marseille	Free

==== Out ====
Date	Pos.	Name	To	Fee
13 July 2005	DF	(Wales) Alex Lawless	(England) Torquay	Free
20 July 2005	FW	(England) Andy Cole	(England) Manchester City	Free
1 August 2005	DF	(Morocco) Abdeslam Ouaddou	(France) Lens	Undisclosed
1 August 2005	GK	(England) Ross Flitney	(England) Barnet	Free
2 August 2005	MF	(England) Lee Clark	(England) Newcastle	Free
31 August 2005	FW	(Ghana) Elvis Hammond	(England) Leicester City	£225,000
31 August 2005	FW	(Scotland) Stuart Noble	(Scotland) East Fife	Undisclosed

=== Winter ===
==== In ====
Date	Pos.	Name	From	Fee
5 January 2006	GK	(Trinidad and Tobago) Tony Warner	(Wales) Cardiff City	Undisclosed
6 January 2006	MF	(New Zealand) Simon Elliott	(United States) Columbus Crew	Free
10 January 2006	GK	(Finland) Antti Niemi	(England) Southampton	Undisclosed
19 January 2006	DF	(England) Wayne Bridge	(England) Chelsea	Loan (until 8 May 2006)
31 January 2006	MF	(England) Michael Brown	(England) Tottenham Hotspur	Undisclosed

=== Out on loan ===
Date	Pos.	Name	To	Return Date
5 August 2005	FW	Elvis Hammond	Leicester City	30 August 2005
30 August 2005	MF	Darren Pratley	Brentford	15 May 2006
31 August 2005	MF	Neale McDermott	Swindon Town	2 February 2006
20 January 2006	DF	Adam Green	Bristol City	20 April 2006
21 January 2006	DF	Robert Watkins	Ebbsfleet United	1 May 2006
31 January 2006	DF	Zesh Rehman	Norwich City	1 May 2006
24 February 2006	MF	Michael Timlin	Scunthorpe United	11 March 2006
24 February 2006	FW	Ismael Ehui	Scunthorpe United	26 March 2006

== Competitions ==
=== Overall ===
- Premier League:12th
- League Cup:3rd Round
- FA Cup:3rd Round

=== Premier League ===
==== League table ====
Pos	Team	Pld	W	D	L	GF	GA	GD	Pts
10	Wigan Athletic	38	15	6	17	45	52	−7	51
11	Everton	38	14	8	16	34	49	−15	50
12	Fulham	38	14	6	18	48	58	−10	48
13	Charlton Athletic	38	13	8	17	41	55	−14	47
14	Middlesbrough	38	12	9	17	48	58	−10	45

Source: Barclays Premier League
Rules for classification: 1) points; 2) goal difference; 3) number of goals scored.

==== Results summary ====
Overall								Home						Away					
Pld	W	D	L	GF	GA	GD	Pts	W	D	L	GF	GA	GD	W	D	L	GF	GA	GD
38	14	6	18	48	58	−10	48	13	2	4	31	21	+10	1	4	14	17	37	−20

Last updated: 7 May 2006.
Source: Barclays Premier League

==== Results By Round ====
Round	1	2	3	4	5	6	7	8	9	10	11	12	13	14	15	16	17	18	19	20	21	22	23	24	25	26	27	28	29	30	31	32	33	34	35	36	37	38
Ground	H	A	A	H	A	H	A	H	A	H	A	H	A	H	A	A	H	A	H	A	H	H	A	H	A	H	A	H	A	A	H	A	H	H	H	A	A	H
Result	D	L	L	W	D	L	L	L	D	W	L	W	L	W	D	L	W	L	D	L	W	W	L	W	L	W	L	L	L	L	W	D	L	W	W	W	L	W
Position	10	15	16	14	13	16	17	18	17	14	15	14	14	14	14	16	14	15	15	15	15	15	14	13	15	14	14	16	16	16	14	15	15	16	15	14	14	12

Updated to match(es) played on 7 May 2006. Source: https://www.worldfootball.net/teams/te847/fulham-fc/all-matches/
A = Away; H = Home; W = Win; D = Draw; L = Loss

== Matches ==
=== Premier League ===
Match	Date	Opponent	Venue	Result	Attendance	Scorers	Report
1	13 August 2005	Birmingham City	H	0–0	16,550		Report
2	20 August 2005	Blackburn Rovers	A	1–2	16,953	McBride	Report
3	24 August 2005	Arsenal	A	1–4	37,867	Jensen	Report
4	27 August 2005	Everton	H	1–0	17,169	McBride	Report
5	10 September 2005	Newcastle United	A	1–1	52,208	McBride	Report
6	17 September 2005	West Ham United	H	1–2	21,907	Boa Morte	Report
7	26 September 2005	Tottenham Hotspur	A	0–1	35,427		Report
8	1 October 2005	Manchester United	H	2–3	21,862	Jensen, John	Report
9	17 October 2005	Charlton Athletic	A	1–1	26,310	John	Report
10	22 October 2005	Liverpool	H	2–0	22,480	John, Boa Morte	Report
11	29 October 2005	Wigan Athletic	A	0–1	17,266		Report
12	5 November 2005	Manchester City	H	2–1	22,241	Malbranque (2)	Report
13	20 November 2005	Middlesbrough	A	2–3	27,599	John, Bouba Diop	Report
14	27 November 2005	Bolton Wanderers	H	2–1	19,768	McBride (2)	Report
15	3 December 2005	West Bromwich Albion	A	0–0	23,144		Report
16	10 December 2005	Birmingham City	A	0–1	27,597		Report
17	17 December 2005	Blackburn Rovers	H	2–1	20,138	Bouba Diop, Boa Morte	Report
18	26 December 2005	Chelsea	A	2–3	42,313	Boa Morte, Helguson	Report
19	28 December 2005	Aston Villa	H	3–3	20,446	McBride (2), Helguson	Report
20	31 December 2005	Portsmouth	A	0–1	19,101		Report
21	2 January 2006	Sunderland	H	2–1	19,372	John (2)	Report
22	14 January 2006	Newcastle United	H	1–0	21,974	Malbranque	Report
23	23 January 2006	West Ham United	A	1–2	29,812	Helguson	Report
24	31 January 2006	Tottenham Hotspur	H	1–0	21,081	Bocanegra	Report
25	4 February 2006	Manchester United	A	2–4	67,844	Helguson, McBride	Report
26	11 February 2006	West Bromwich Albion	H	6–1	21,508	Helguson (2), Radzinski, John (2), Davies (o.g.)	Report
27	26 February 2006	Bolton Wanderers	A	1–2	23,104	Helguson	Report
28	4 March 2006	Arsenal	H	0–4	22,397		Report
29	11 March 2006	Everton	A	1–3	36,515	John	Report
30	15 March 2006	Liverpool	A	1–5	42,293	John	Report
31	19 March 2006	Chelsea	H	1–0	22,486	Boa Morte	Report
32	25 March 2006	Aston Villa	A	0–0	32,605		Report
33	1 April 2006	Portsmouth	H	1–3	22,322	Malbranque	Report
34	15 April 2006	Charlton Athletic	H	2–1	19,146	Boa Morte (2)	Report
35	24 April 2006	Wigan Athletic	H	1–0	17,164	Malbranque	Report
36	29 April 2006	Manchester City	A	2–1	41,128	Malbranque, John	Report
37	4 May 2006	Sunderland	A	1–2	28,226	Radzinski	Report
38	7 May 2006	Middlesbrough	H	1–0	22,434	Helguson	Report

=== FA Cup ===
Round	Date	Opponent	Venue	Result	Attendance	Scorers	Report
R3	8 January 2006	Leyton Orient	H	1–2	13,394	John	Report

=== League Cup ===
Round	Date	Opponent	Venue	Result	Attendance	Scorers	Report
R2	21 September 2005	Lincoln City	H	5–4	5,365	Rehman, Helguson, Rosenior, Radzinski, McBride	Report
R3	25 October 2005	West Bromwich Albion	H	2–3	7,373	Helguson, Boa Morte	Report
