= 2006–07 Fulham F.C. season =

Fulham F.C.
2006–07 season
- Manager: Chris Coleman; Lawrie Sanchez (caretaker)
- Stadium: Craven Cottage
- FA Premier League: 16th
- FA Cup: Fifth round
- League Cup: Second round
- Top goalscorer: League: Brian McBride (9); All: Brian McBride (12)
- Highest home attendance: 24,554 (vs. Liverpool, 5 May 2007)
- Lowest home attendance: 6,620 (vs. Wycombe Wanderers, 20 September 2006)
Home colours	Away colours

The 2006–07 season was Fulham's sixth consecutive season in the Premier League.

== Season summary ==
Fulham started the season well and looked to be challenging for a mid-table place at least, but a slump towards the end of the season, with one win in 18 games, saw Fulham sucked into the relegation battle. Manager Chris Coleman paid for the club's poor form with his job in April. His replacement, Northern Ireland manager Lawrie Sanchez, did little to stop the rot, but managed to secure Fulham's Premiership status with a 1–0 win over a Liverpool side preparing for the Champions League final, with January signing Clint Dempsey scored the crucial goal. At the end of the season, Sanchez was rewarded for his efforts with a three-year contract, which necessitated his resignation as Northern Ireland manager.

== Players ==
=== First-team squad ===
Squad at end of season

Note: Flags indicate national team as defined under FIFA eligibility rules; some limited exceptions apply. Players may hold more than one non-FIFA nationality.

No.	Pos.	Nation	Player
2	DF	GER	Moritz Volz
3	DF	USA	Carlos Bocanegra
4	DF	FRA	Franck Queudrue
5	DF	FRA	Philippe Christanval
6	DF	ENG	Zat Knight
7	DF	ENG	Liam Rosenior
8	MF	ENG	Michael Brown
9	FW	ISL	Heiðar Helguson
10	FW	SWE	Björn Runström
12	GK	CZE	Jan Laštůvka (on loan from Shakhtar Donetsk)
13	FW	CAN	Tomasz Radzinski (Note: Radzinski was born in Poznań, Poland, but also qualified to represent Canada internationally and made his international debut for Canada in June 1995.)
14	MF	SEN	Papa Bouba Diop
15	FW	NED	Collins John (Note: John was born in Zwedru, Liberia, but was raised in the Netherlands and made his international debut for the Netherlands in August 2004.)

No.	Pos.	Nation	Player
16	MF	DEN	Claus Jensen
18	DF	COD	Gabriel Zakuani
19	DF	ENG	Ian Pearce
20	FW	USA	Brian McBride (captain)
21	MF	ENG	Jimmy Bullard
22	MF	ENG	Wayne Routledge (on loan from Tottenham Hotspur)
23	MF	USA	Clint Dempsey
25	MF	WAL	Simon Davies
29	GK	FIN	Antti Niemi
32	DF	ENG	Elliot Omozusi
36	DF	ENG	Matthew Briggs
37	MF	RUS	Alexey Smertin

=== Left club during season ===
Note: Flags indicate national team as defined under FIFA eligibility rules; some limited exceptions apply. Players may hold more than one non-FIFA nationality.

No.	Pos.	Nation	Player
—	MF	FRA	Sylvain Legwinski (to Ipswich Town)
—	MF	FRA	Steed Malbranque (Note: Malbranque was born in Mouscron, Belgium, but also qualified to represent France internationally and represented them at U-21 level before being called up by France in February 2004 without playing.) (to Tottenham Hotspur)
11	FW	POR	Luís Boa Morte (to West Ham United)
11	FW	ITA	Vincenzo Montella (on loan from Roma)
18	DF	COD	Gabriel Zakuani (on loan to Stoke City)

No.	Pos.	Nation	Player
23	MF	IRL	Michael Timlin (Note: Timlin was born in Peckham, England, but also qualified to represent the Republic of Ireland internationally and represented them at U-17 and U-21 level.) (on loan to Swindon Town)
25	DF	DEN	Niclas Jensen (to FC København)
30	GK	TRI	Tony Warner (Note: Warner was born in Liverpool, England, but also qualified to represent Trinidad and Tobago internationally and made his international debut for Trinidad and Tobago in February 2006.) (on loan to Leeds United and Norwich City)
31	GK	POR	Ricardo Batista (on loan to Wycombe Wanderers)
32	GK	CZE	Jaroslav Drobný (released)

=== Reserve squad ===
Squad at end of season

Note: Flags indicate national team as defined under FIFA eligibility rules; some limited exceptions apply. Players may hold more than one non-FIFA nationality.

No.	Pos.	Nation	Player
1	GK	WAL	Mark Crossley (Note: Crossley was born in Barnsley, England, and represented them at U-21 level, but also qualified to represent Wales internationally through a grandparent and made his international debut for Wales in February 1997.)
17	MF	NZL	Simon Elliott
24	MF	WAL	Mark Pembridge
26	MF	WAL	Matthew Collins
27	MF	AUS	Ahmad Elrich
28	MF	ENG	Robert Milsom
31	GK	POR	Ricardo Batista
—	GK	ENG	Corrin Brooks-Meade

No.	Pos.	Nation	Player
—	DF	ENG	Kasali Yinka Casal
—	DF	ENG	TJ Moncur
—	DF	ENG	Adam Watts
—	MF	ENG	Wayne Brown
—	MF	NZL	Chris James
—	FW	FRA	Ismael Ehui
—	FW	GHA	Bradley Hudson-Odoi

== Statistics ==
=== Appearances and goals ===
No.	Pos	Nat	Player	Total		Premier League		FA Cup		League Cup	
No.	Pos	Nat	Player	Apps	Goals	Apps	Goals	Apps	Goals	Apps	Goals
Goalkeepers
12	GK	(Czech Republic) CZE	Jan Laštůvka	12	0	7+1	0	3	0	1	0
29	GK	(Finland) FIN	Antti Niemi	31	0	31	0	0	0	0	0
30	GK	(Trinidad and Tobago) TRI	Tony Warner	1	0	0	0	1	0	0	0
Defenders
3	DF	(United States) USA	Carlos Bocanegra	34	5	26+4	5	3	0	1	0
4	DF	(France) FRA	Franck Queudrue	32	1	28+1	1	3	0	0	0
5	DF	(France) FRA	Philippe Christanval	23	1	19+1	1	3	0	0	0
6	DF	(England) ENG	Zat Knight	24	2	22+1	2	1	0	0	0
7	DF	(England) ENG	Liam Rosenior	42	0	38	0	3	0	0+1	0
18	DF	(Democratic Republic of the Congo) COD	Gabriel Zakuani	2	0	0	0	0+1	0	1	0
19	DF	(England) ENG	Ian Pearce	23	1	22	1	1	0	0	0
25	DF	(Denmark) DEN	Niclas Jensen	1	0	0	0	0	0	1	0
32	DF	(England) ENG	Elliot Omozusi	2	0	0	0	1	0	0+1	0
36	DF	(England) ENG	Matthew Briggs	1	0	0+1	0	0	0	0	0
Midfielders
2	MF	(Germany) GER	Moritz Volz	34	3	24+5	2	4	1	1	0
8	MF	(England) ENG	Michael Brown	37	0	34	0	3	0	0	0
13	MF	(Canada) CAN	Tomasz Radzinski	40	3	25+10	2	4	1	1	0
14	MF	(Senegal) SEN	Papa Bouba Diop	24	0	20+3	0	1	0	0	0
16	MF	(Denmark) DEN	Claus Jensen	14	2	10+2	2	0+1	0	1	0
21	MF	(England) ENG	Jimmy Bullard	4	2	4	2	0	0	0	0
22	MF	(England) ENG	Wayne Routledge	28	1	13+11	0	3	1	1	0
23	MF	(United States) USA	Clint Dempsey	12	1	1+9	1	0+2	0	0	0
25	MF	(Wales) WAL	Simon Davies	16	2	14	2	1+1	0	0	0
37	MF	(Russia) RUS	Alexei Smertin	8	0	6+1	0	1	0	0	0
Forwards
9	FW	(Iceland) ISL	Heiðar Helguson	34	4	16+14	3	3	0	1	1
10	FW	(Sweden) SWE	Björn Runström	2	0	0+1	0	0	0	1	0
11	FW	(Italy) ITA	Vincenzo Montella	14	5	3+7	2	1+3	3	0	0
15	FW	(Netherlands) NED	Collins John	25	1	9+14	1	0+1	0	0+1	0
20	FW	(United States) USA	Brian McBride	42	12	34+4	9	4	3	0	0
Players transferred or loaned out during the season
11	MF	(Portugal) POR	Luís Boa Morte	15	0	12+3	0	0	0	0	0
23	MF	(Republic of Ireland) IRL	Michael Timlin	1	0	0	0	0	0	1	0

Last updated: 31 June 2007
Source: Competitions

== Transfers ==
=== In ===
Date	Pos.	Name	From	Fee
8 May 2006	MF	(England) Jimmy Bullard	(England) Wigan Athletic	£2,500,000
11 July 2006	DF	(Democratic Republic of the Congo) Gabriel Zakuani	(England) Leyton Orient	Undisclosed
12 July 2006	FW	(Sweden) Björn Runström	(Sweden) Hammarby	Undisclosed
27 July 2006	DF	(France) Franck Queudrue	(England) Middlesbrough	Undisclosed
31 August 2006	MF	(England) Wayne Routledge	(England) Tottenham Hotspur	Season-long loan
31 August 2006	GK	(Czech Republic) Jan Laštůvka	(Ukraine) Shakhtar Donetsk	Season-long loan
4 January 2007	FW	(Italy) Vincenzo Montella	(Italy) Roma	Loan
10 January 2007	MF	(United States) Clint Dempsey	(United States) New England Revolution	£1,500,000
24 January 2007	MF	(Wales) Simon Davies	(England) Everton	Undisclosed
27 January 2007	MF	(Russia) Alexey Smertin	(Russia) Dynamo Moscow	Free

=== Out ===
Date	Pos.	Name	To	Fee
31 August 2006	MF	(France) Sylvain Legwinski	(England) Ipswich Town	Undisclosed
31 August 2006	MF	(France) Steed Malbranque	(England) Tottenham Hotspur	Undisclosed
5 January 2007	FW	(Portugal) Luís Boa Morte	(England) West Ham United	£5,000,000
11 January 2007	DF	(Denmark) Niclas Jensen	(Denmark) København	Free

== Club ==
=== Management ===
Position	Staff
Manager (Aug-Apr)	(Wales) Chris Coleman
Manager (Apr-May)	(Northern Ireland) Lawrie Sanchez
Assistant manager	(Scotland) Steve Kean
Goalkeeping coach	(England) Dave Beasant
Head of Youth Development	(England) John Murtough

Source: Fulham FC

=== Other information ===
Chairman	(Egypt) Mohamed Al Fayed
Ground (capacity and dimensions)	Craven Cottage (26,600 / 112x72 yards)

Source: Fulham article on 15 August 2007

=== Premier League ===
==== Table ====
Pos	Team	Pld	W	D	L	GF	GA	GD	Pts	Qualification or relegation
14	Manchester City	38	11	9	18	29	44	−15	42	
15	West Ham United	38	12	5	21	35	59	−24	41	
16	Fulham	38	8	15	15	38	60	−22	39	
17	Wigan Athletic	38	10	8	20	37	59	−22	38	
18	Sheffield United (R)	38	10	8	20	32	55	−23	38	Relegation to Football League Championship

Source: Barclays Premier League
Rules for classification: 1) points; 2) goal difference; 3) number of goals scored.
(R) Relegated

==== Results summary ====
Overall								Home						Away					
Pld	W	D	L	GF	GA	GD	Pts	W	D	L	GF	GA	GD	W	D	L	GF	GA	GD
38	8	15	15	38	60	−22	39	7	7	5	18	18	0	1	8	10	20	42	−22

Last updated: 13 May 2007.
Source: Barclays Premier League

== Matches ==
=== Pre-season friendlies ===
2006-07-15	Exeter	1 - 0	Fulham	St James Park, Exeter
14:00	Phillips 31'	(Report)

2006-07-21	Luton	1 - 2	Fulham	Kenilworth Road, Luton
19:45	Feeney 30'	(Report)	John 16'; Helguson 48'

2006-07-26	Fulham	1 - 0	Maccabi Petah Tikva	Mur in Selstadion, Bruck an der Mur
18:00	Elrich 56'	(Report)

2006-07-29	Fulham	0 - 0	Real Madrid	ATV Arena, Irdning
18:00		(Report)

2006-08-05	Borussia Mönchengladbach	0 - 1	Fulham	Hubert Houben Stadion, Goch
18:00		Report	Levels 49' (o.g.)

2006-08-12	Fulham	1 - 1	Boavista	Craven Cottage
15:00	Helguson 14'	(Report)	Fary 79'

=== Premier League ===
==== Results by round ====
Round	1	2	3	4	5	6	7	8	9	10	11	12	13	14	15	16	17	18	19	20	21	22	23	24	25	26	27	28	29	30	31	32	33	34	35	36	37
Ground	A	H	H	A	A	H	A	H	A	H	H	A	A	H	H	A	H	H	A	A	H	A	H	A	H	A	H	H	A	H	A	H	A	H	A	H	A
Result	L	D	W	W	D	L	D	W	D	L	W	D	L	L	W	L	W	D	D	D	D	D	D	L	W	L	L	D	D	D	L	L	L	D	L	W	L
Position	20	18	11	8	9	11	11	10	8	9	9	10	11	12	12	13	11	12	12	11	12	13	15	15	14	14	14	14	14	15	15	15	16	15	16	15	16

Updated to match(es) played on 13 May 2007. Source: "Fulham FC – Fixtures & Results 2006/2007". worldfootball.net.
A = Away; H = Home; W = Win; D = Draw; L = Loss

2006-08-20	Manchester United	5 – 1	Fulham	Old Trafford, Manchester
13:30	Saha 7'; Pearce 15' (o.g.); Rooney 16', 64'; Ronaldo 19'	(Report)	Ferdinand 40' (o.g.)	Attendance: 75,115; Referee: Andre Marriner

2006-08-23	Fulham	1 – 1	Bolton Wanderers	Craven Cottage
20:00	Bullard 90' (pen.)	(Report)	Diouf 73' (pen.)	Attendance: 18,559; Referee: Alan Wiley

2006-08-26	Fulham	1 – 0	Sheffield United	Craven Cottage
15:00	Bullard 40'	(Report)		Attendance: 18,362; Referee: Graham Poll

2006-09-09	Newcastle United	1 – 2	Fulham	St James' Park, Newcastle
15:00	Parker 54'	(Report)	McBride 82'; Bocanegra 89'	Attendance: 50,365; Referee: Chris Foy

2006-09-17	Tottenham	0 – 0	Fulham	White Hart Lane, London
15:00		(Report)		Attendance: 36,131; Referee: Mark Clattenburg

2006-09-23	Fulham	0 – 2	Chelsea	Craven Cottage
15:00		(Report)	Lampard 73' (pen.), 80'	Attendance: 24,290; Referee: Mark Halsey

2006-10-02	Watford	3 – 3	Fulham	Vicarage Road, Watford
20:00	King 23'; Young 46', 89'	(Report)	McBride 71'; Helguson 83'; Francis 87' (o.g.)	Attendance: 17,982; Referee: Mike Riley

2006-10-16	Fulham	2 – 1	Charlton Athletic	Craven Cottage
20:00	McBride 65'; C. Jensen 67'	(Report)	Bent 78'	Attendance: 19,179; Referee: Rob Styles

2006-10-21	Aston Villa	1 – 1	Fulham	Villa Park, Birmingham
17:15	Barry 26' (pen.)	(Report)	Volz 45'	Attendance: 30,919; Referee: Chris Foy

2006-10-28	Fulham	0 – 1	Wigan Athletic	Craven Cottage
15:00		(Report)	Camara 83'	Attendance: 22,882; Referee: Graham Poll

2006-11-04	Fulham	1 – 0	Everton	Craven Cottage
12:45	C. Jensen 66'	(Report)		Attendance: 23,327; Referee: Graham Poll

2006-11-11	Portsmouth	1 – 1	Fulham	Fratton Park, Portsmouth
15:00	Cole 74'	(Report)	Knight 57'	Attendance: 19,563; Referee: Steve Bennett

2006-11-18	Manchester City	3 – 1	Fulham	City of Manchester Stadium, Manchester
12:45	Corradi 12', 32'; Barton 45'	(Report)	John 62'	Attendance: 35,776; Referee: Alan Wiley

2006-11-25	Fulham	0 – 1	Reading	Craven Cottage
15:00		(Report)	Doyle 17' (pen.)	Attendance: 22,673; Referee: Dermot Gallagher

2006-11-29	Fulham	2 – 1	Arsenal	Craven Cottage
19:45	McBride 6'; Radzinski 19'	(Report)	Van Persie 36'	Attendance: 24,510; Referee: Howard Webb

2006-12-02	Blackburn	2 – 0	Fulham	Ewood Park, Blackburn
15:00	Nonda 6'; McCarthy 24'	(Report)		Attendance: 16,799; Referee: Steve Bennett

2006-12-09	Liverpool	4 – 0	Fulham	Anfield, Liverpool
15:00	Gerrard 54'; Carragher 61'; García 66'; González 90'	(Report)		Attendance: 43,189; Referee: Uriah Rennie

2006-12-18	Fulham	2 – 1	Middlesbrough	Craven Cottage
20:00	Helguson 12' (pen.); McBride 35'	(Report)	Viduka 74'	Attendance: 16,323; Referee: Mike Dean

2006-12-23	Fulham	0 – 0	West Ham	Craven Cottage
12:45		Report		Attendance: 22,452; Referee: Chris Foy

2006-12-27	Charlton	2 – 2	Fulham	The Valley, London
20:00	Ambrose 19'; Bent 45'	(Report)	McBride 13'; Queudrue 90'	Attendance: 25,203; Referee: Graham Poll

2006-12-30	Chelsea	2 – 2	Fulham	Stamford Bridge, London
15:00	Rosenior 35' (o.g.); Drogba 62'	(Report)	Volz 16'; Bocanegra 84'	Attendance: 41,926; Referee: Howard Webb

2007-01-01	Fulham	0 – 0	Watford	Craven Cottage
15:00		(Report)		Attendance: 19,698; Referee: Steve Bennett

2007-01-13	West Ham United	3 – 3	Fulham	Upton Park, London
15:00	Zamora 28'; Benayoun 46', 64'	(Report)	Radzinski 16'; McBride 59'; Christanval 90'	Attendance: 34,977; Referee: Graham Poll

2007-01-20	Fulham	1 – 1	Tottenham Hotspur	Craven Cottage
15:00	Montella 84' (pen.)	Report	Chimbonda 88'	Attendance: 23,580; Referee: Mike Dean

2007-01-30	Sheffield United	2 – 0	Fulham	Bramall Lane, Sheffield
19:45	Stead 23'; Tonge 28'	(Report)		Attendance: 27,540; Referee: Lee Mason

2007-02-03	Fulham	2 – 1	Newcastle United	Craven Cottage
15:00	Helguson 49'; McBride 73'	(Report)	Martins 90'	Attendance: 24,340; Referee: Phil Dowd

2007-02-11	Bolton Wanderers	2 – 1	Fulham	Reebok Stadium, Bolton
13:30	Speed 23' (pen.); Nolan 51'	(Report)	Knight 66'	Attendance: 24,919; Referee: Howard Webb

2007-02-24	Fulham	1 – 2	Manchester United	Craven Cottage
12:45	McBride 17'	(Report)	Giggs 29'; Ronaldo 88'	Attendance: 24,459; Referee: Peter Walton

2007-03-03	Fulham	1 – 1	Aston Villa	Craven Cottage
15:00	Bocanegra 23'	(Report)	Carew 21'	Attendance: 24,552; Referee: Lee Mason

2007-03-17	Wigan Athletic	0 – 0	Fulham	JJB Stadium, Wigan
15:00		(Report)		Attendance: 16,001; Referee: Steve Tanner

2007-03-31	Fulham	1 – 1	Portsmouth	Craven Cottage
15:00	Pearce 90'	(Report)	Kranjčar 4'	Attendance: 22,806; Referee: Mike Riley

2007-04-06	Everton	4 – 1	Fulham	Goodison Park, Liverpool
19:30	Carsley 25'; Stubbs 34'; Vaughan 45'; Anichebe 80'	Report	Bocanegra 22'	Attendance: 35,612; Referee: Dermot Gallagher

2007-04-09	Fulham	1 – 3	Manchester City	Craven Cottage
15:00	Bocanegra 76'	(Report)	Barton 21'; Beasley 36'; Vassell 59'	Attendance: 22,435; Referee: Steve Bennett

2007-04-14	Reading	1 – 0	Fulham	Madejski Stadium, Reading
15:00	Hunt 15'	(Report)		Attendance: 24,082; Referee: Lee Mason

2007-04-21	Fulham	1 – 1	Blackburn	Craven Cottage
15:00	Montella 10'	Report	McCarthy 61'	Attendance: 23,652; Referee: Graham Poll

2007-04-29	Arsenal	3 – 1	Fulham	Emirates Stadium, London
16:00	Baptista 4'; Adebayor 84'; Gilberto 87' (pen.)	Report	Davies 78'	Attendance: 60,043; Referee: Mark Clattenburg

2007-05-05	Fulham	1 – 0	Liverpool	Craven Cottage
15:00	Dempsey 69'	Report		Attendance: 24,554; Referee: Steve Bennett

2007-05-13	Middlesbrough	3 – 1	Fulham	Riverside Stadium, Middlesbrough
15:00	Viduka 34', 47'; Wheater 45'	(Report)	Davies 42'	Attendance: 29,556; Referee: Mike Riley

=== League Cup ===
2006-09-20	Fulham	1 - 2	Wycombe	Craven Cottage
19:45	Helguson 47'	Report	Easter 8'; Mooney 41' (pen.)	Attendance: 6,620; Referee: Andy Hall

=== FA Cup ===
2007-01-06	Leicester City	2 – 2	Fulham	Walkers Stadium, Leicester
15:00	Kisnorbo 80'; Cadamarteri 90'	Report	McBride 69'; Volz 83'	Attendance: 15,499; Referee: Mark Clattenburg

2007-01-17	Fulham	4 – 3	Leicester City	Craven Cottage
19:45	McBride 35'; Montella 51', 60'; Routledge 90'	(Report)	Fryatt 13'; McAuley 45'; Wesolowski 47'	Attendance: 11,222; Referee: Alan Wiley

2007-01-27	Fulham	3 – 0	Stoke	Craven Cottage
15:00	Montella 11'; McBride 39'; Radzinski 54'	(Report)		Attendance: 11,059; Referee: Martin Atkinson

2007-02-18	Fulham	0 – 4	Tottenham Hotspur	Craven Cottage
16:00		Report	Keane 6', 68'; Berbatov 77', 90'	Attendance: 18,655; Referee: Mark Halsey

== Player statistics ==
=== Goalscorers ===
Goalscoring statistics for 2006–07.

Name	League	FA Cup	League Cup	Total
(United States) Brian McBride	9	3	0	12
(United States) Carlos Bocanegra	5	0	0	5
(Italy) Vincenzo Montella	2	3	0	5
(Iceland) Heiðar Helguson	3	0	1	4
(Canada) Tomasz Radzinski	2	1	0	3
(Germany) Moritz Volz	2	1	0	3
(England) Jimmy Bullard	2	0	0	2
(Wales) Simon Davies	2	0	0	2
(Denmark) Claus Jensen	2	0	0	2
(England) Zat Knight	2	0	0	2
(France) Philippe Christanval	1	0	0	1
(United States) Clint Dempsey	1	0	0	1
(Netherlands) Collins John	1	0	0	1
(France) Franck Queudrue	1	0	0	1
(England) Ian Pearce	1	0	0	1
(England) Wayne Routledge	0	1	0	1
Own goals	2	0	0	2
Total	38	9	1	48
