= 2004–05 Fulham F.C. season =

Fulham F.C.
2004–05 season
- Manager: Chris Coleman
- Stadium: Craven Cottage
- FA Premier League: 13th
- FA Cup: Fifth round
- League Cup: Quarter-finals
- Top goalscorer: League: Andy Cole (12); All: Andy Cole (13)
Home colours	Away colours

The 2004–05 season was Fulham F.C.'s fourth consecutive season in the top flight of English football, the Premier League. They were managed by former player, Chris Coleman, who managed to guide them into a mid-table position of 13th.

Despite not being involved in a relegation dogfight at the end of the season, they still had a big say in deciding who went down as they beat Norwich City 6–0 on the last day to relegate the East Anglians and save West Bromwich Albion.

In other competitions, they reached the quarter finals of the League Cup, where they lost to Chelsea, and also reached the fifth round of the FA Cup.

== Players ==
=== First-team squad ===
Squad at end of season

Note: Flags indicate national team as defined under FIFA eligibility rules; some limited exceptions apply. Players may hold more than one non-FIFA nationality.

No.	Pos.	Nation	Player
1	GK	NED	Edwin van der Sar
2	DF	GER	Moritz Volz
3	DF	USA	Carlos Bocanegra
4	MF	FRA	Steed Malbranque (Note: Malbranque was born in Mouscron, Belgium, but also qualified to represent France internationally and represented them at U-21 level before being called up by France in February 2004 without playing.)
5	MF	FRA	Sylvain Legwinski
6	DF	ENG	Zat Knight
7	MF	WAL	Mark Pembridge
8	FW	USA	Brian McBride
9	FW	ENG	Andy Cole
10	MF	ENG	Lee Clark (captain)
11	FW	POR	Luís Boa Morte
12	GK	WAL	Mark Crossley (Note: Crossley was born in Barnsley, England, and represented them at U-21 level, but also qualified to represent Wales internationally through a grandparent and made his international debut for Wales in February 1997.)
14	MF	SEN	Papa Bouba Diop

No.	Pos.	Nation	Player
15	FW	NED	Collins John (Note: John was born in Zwedru, Liberia, but was raised in the Netherlands and made his international debut for the Netherlands in August 2004.)
17	FW	CAN	Tomasz Radzinski (Note: Radzinski was born in Poznań, Poland, but also qualified to represent Canada internationally and made his international debut for Canada in June 1995.)
19	FW	GHA	Elvis Hammond
20	MF	DEN	Claus Jensen
21	DF	ENG	Zesh Rehman (Note: Rehman was born in Birmingham, England, and represented them at U-18, U-19 and U-20 level, but also qualified to represent Pakistan internationally through his parents and would make his international debut for Pakistan in December 2005.)
23	MF	IRL	Michael Timlin (Note: Timlin was born in Peckham, England, but also qualified to represent the Republic of Ireland internationally and represented them at U-17 and U-21 level.)
24	DF	FRA	Alain Goma
25	MF	ENG	Malik Buari (Note: Buari was born in Accra, Ghana, but also qualified to represent England internationally and represented them at U-15 and U-16 level.)
28	MF	ENG	Omar Saleem
30	DF	ENG	Adam Green
35	DF	ENG	Ian Pearce
36	DF	SCO	Billy McKinlay
37	DF	ENG	Liam Rosenior

=== Reserve squad ===
Note: Flags indicate national team as defined under FIFA eligibility rules; some limited exceptions apply. Players may hold more than one non-FIFA nationality.

No.	Pos.	Nation	Player
13	GK	ENG	Ross Flitney
16	GK	POR	Ricardo Batista
18	DF	FRA	Jérôme Bonnissel
22	DF	ENG	Dean Leacock
26	FW	ARG	Facundo Sava
29	MF	ENG	Sean Doherty

No.	Pos.	Nation	Player
31	MF	ENG	Darren Pratley
33	FW	SCO	Stuart Noble
34	MF	ENG	Neale McDermott
38	DF	ENG	Robbie Watkins
39	FW	FRA	Ismael Ehui
—	MF	WAL	Alex Lawless
—	MF	PAK	Zesh Rehman

== Statistics ==
=== Appearances and goals ===
As of 31 June 2005

No.	Pos	Nat	Player	Total		Premier League		FA Cup		Football League Cup	
No.	Pos	Nat	Player	Apps	Goals	Apps	Goals	Apps	Goals	Apps	Goals
Goalkeepers
1	GK	(Netherlands) NED	Edwin van der Sar	40	0	33+1	0	5	0	1	0
12	GK	(Wales) WAL	Mark Crossley	8	0	5	0	0	0	3	0
Defenders
2	DF	(Germany) GER	Moritz Volz	36	1	31	0	2	1	3	0
3	DF	(United States) USA	Carlos Bocanegra	35	1	26+2	1	4	0	3	0
6	DF	(England) ENG	Zat Knight	42	2	35	1	5	1	2	0
21	DF	(England) ENG	Zesh Rehman	23	0	15+2	0	2	0	4	0
24	DF	(France) FRA	Alain Goma	20	0	15+1	0	2+1	0	1	0
28	DF	(England) ENG	Liam Fontaine	2	0	0+1	0	1	0	0	0
30	DF	(England) ENG	Adam Green	5	0	4	0	0	0	1	0
35	DF	(England) ENG	Ian Pearce	12	0	11	0	0	0	1	0
37	DF	(England) ENG	Liam Rosenior	23	0	16+1	0	4	0	1+1	0
Midfielders
4	MF	(France) FRA	Steed Malbranque	31	7	22+4	6	1	0	4	1
5	MF	(France) FRA	Sylvain Legwinski	22	1	13+2	1	5	0	1+1	0
7	MF	(Wales) WAL	Mark Pembridge	34	1	26+2	0	2+1	0	3	1
10	MF	(England) ENG	Lee Clark	22	1	15+2	1	4+1	0	0	0
14	MF	(Senegal) SEN	Papa Bouba Diop	35	7	29	6	3	1	3	0
20	MF	(Denmark) DEN	Claus Jensen	15	1	10+2	0	0+2	1	1	0
23	MF	(Republic of Ireland) IRL	Michael Timlin	1	0	0	0	0	0	0+1	0
25	MF	(England) ENG	Malik Buari	1	0	0	0	0	0	1	0
36	MF	(Scotland) SCO	Billy McKinlay	3	0	1+1	0	0	0	1	0
Forwards
8	FW	(United States) USA	Brian McBride	37	9	15+16	6	0+2	0	2+2	3
9	FW	(England) ENG	Andy Cole	39	13	29+2	12	5	0	3	1
11	FW	(Portugal) POR	Luís Boa Morte	39	9	29+2	8	5	1	3	0
15	FW	(Netherlands) NED	Collins John	34	6	13+14	4	1+4	2	0+2	0
17	FW	(Canada) CAN	Tomasz Radzinski	41	11	25+10	6	4	1	2	4
19	FW	(Ghana) GHA	Elvis Hammond	2	0	0+1	0	0	0	0+1	0

== Transfers ==
In

Date	Pos.	Name	From	Fee
18 July 2004	FW	(England) Andy Cole	(England) Blackburn Rovers	Undisclosed
23 July 2004	FW	(Canada) Tomasz Radzinski	(England) Everton	Undisclosed (estimated £1,750,000)
23 July 2004	MF	(Denmark) Claus Jensen	(England) Charlton Athletic	£1,250,000
27 July 2004	MF	(Senegal) Papa Bouba Diop	(France) Lens	Undisclosed
1 June 2005	GK	(Czech Republic) Jaroslav Drobný	(Greece) Panionios	Undisclosed
9 June 2005	MF	(Australia) Ahmad Elrich	(South Korea) Busan I'cons	Undisclosed

Out

Date	Pos.	Name	To	Fee
21 June 2004	DF	(England) Jon Harley	(England) Sheffield United	Undisclosed
9 July 2004	MF	(England) Sean Davis	(England) Tottenham Hotspur	£3,000,000
11 July 2004	DF	(England) Mark Hudson	(England) Crystal Palace	Undisclosed
27 August 2004	FW	(Argentina) Facundo Sava	(Spain) Celta Vigo	Loan
6 June 2005	GK	(Netherlands) Edwin van der Sar	(England) Manchester United	Undisclosed (estimated £2,000,000)

== Competitions ==
=== Overall ===
- Premier League: 13th
- League Cup: Quarter-finals
- FA Cup: Fifth round

=== Premier League ===
==== Premier League table ====
Pos	Team	Pld	W	D	L	GF	GA	GD	Pts	Qualification or relegation
11	Charlton Athletic	38	12	10	16	42	58	−16	46	
12	Birmingham City	38	11	12	15	40	46	−6	45	
13	Fulham	38	12	8	18	52	60	−8	44	
14	Newcastle United	38	10	14	14	47	57	−10	44	Qualification for the Intertoto Cup third round
15	Blackburn Rovers	38	9	15	14	32	43	−11	42	

Rules for classification: 1) points; 2) goal difference; 3) number of goals scored.

==== Results summary ====
Overall								Home						Away					
Pld	W	D	L	GF	GA	GD	Pts	W	D	L	GF	GA	GD	W	D	L	GF	GA	GD
38	12	8	18	52	60	−8	44	8	4	7	29	26	+3	4	4	11	23	34	−11

Last updated: 13 May 2004.
Source: Barclays Premier League

==== Results by round ====
Round	1	2	3	4	5	6	7	8	9	10	11	12	13	14	15	16	17	18	19	20	21	22	23	24	25	26	27	28	29	30	31	32	33	34	35	36	37	38
Ground	A	H	H	A	H	A	H	A	H	A	H	A	H	A	H	A	H	A	A	H	H	A	H	A	H	A	A	H	A	H	A	H	A	A	H	H	A	H
Result	D	W	L	L	L	D	W	L	L	L	W	W	L	L	L	W	D	L	L	L	W	D	W	W	D	L	L	D	L	W	L	D	D	L	W	L	W	W
Position	10	4	8	13	16	15	12	14	16	17	15	12	13	13	15	14	14	15	15	16	15	15	15	13	15	15	15	16	16	15	16	16	16	16	16	16	15	13

Updated to match(es) played on 13 May 2004. Source: https://www.worldfootball.net/teams/te847/fulham-fc/all-matches/
A = Away; H = Home; W = Win; D = Draw; L = Loss

== Results ==
=== Premier League ===
Date	Opponent	Venue	Result	Attendance	Scorers
14 August 2004	Manchester City	A	1–1	44,026	John
21 August 2004	Bolton Wanderers	H	2–0	17,541	Cole (2)
25 August 2004	Middlesbrough	H	0–2	17,759	
30 August 2004	Portsmouth	A	3–4	19,728	Cole, Boa Morte, Bocanegra
11 September 2004	Arsenal	H	0–3	21,681	
18 September 2004	West Bromwich Albion	A	1–1	24,128	Cole
25 September 2004	Southampton	H	1–0	19,237	Radzinski
4 October 2004	Crystal Palace	A	0–2	21,825	
16 October 2004	Liverpool	H	2–4	21,884	Boa Morte (2)
23 October 2004	Aston Villa	A	0–2	34,460	
30 October 2004	Tottenham Hotspur	H	2–0	21,137	Boa Morte, Cole
7 November 2004	Newcastle United	A	4–1	51,118	John, Malbranque (2), Boa Morte
13 November 2004	Chelsea	H	1–4	21,877	Diop
20 November 2004	Everton	A	0–1	34,763	
27 November 2004	Blackburn Rovers	H	0–2	19,103	
4 December 2004	Norwich City	A	1–0	23,755	Cole
13 December 2004	Manchester United	H	1–1	21,940	Diop
20 December 2004	Charlton Athletic	A	1–2	26,108	Radzinski
26 December 2004	Arsenal	A	0–2	38,047	
28 December 2004	Birmingham City	H	2–3	18,706	Legwinski, Radzinski
1 January 2005	Crystal Palace	H	3–1	18,680	Cole (2), Radzinski
5 January 2005	Southampton	A	3–3	27,343	Diop, Malbranque, Radzinski
16 January 2005	West Bromwich Albion	H	1–0	16,180	Diop
22 January 2005	Birmingham City	A	2–1	28,512	Cole (pen.), Diop
2 February 2005	Aston Villa	H	1–1	17,624	Clark
5 February 2005	Liverpool	A	1–3	43,534	Cole
26 February 2005	Tottenham Hotspur	A	0–2	35,885	
5 March 2005	Charlton Athletic	H	0–0	18,290	
19 March 2005	Manchester United	A	0–1	67,959	
3 April 2005	Portsmouth	H	3–1	20,502	Cole, McBride, Boa Morte
9 April 2005	Bolton Wanderers	A	1–3	25,493	Boa Morte
16 April 2005	Manchester City	H	1–1	21,796	Boa Morte
19 April 2005	Middlesbrough	A	1–1	30,650	McBride
23 April 2005	Chelsea	A	1–3	42,081	John
30 April 2005	Everton	H	2–0	21,881	John, McBride
4 May 2005	Newcastle United	H	1–3	19,003	Radzinski
7 May 2005	Blackburn Rovers	A	3–1	18,991	Malbranque (2), McBride
15 May 2005	Norwich City	H	6–0	21,927	McBride (2), Diop, Knight, Malbranque, Cole

=== League Cup ===
Date	Round	Opponent	Venue	Result	Attendance	Scorers
22 September 2004	R2	Boston United	A	4–1	5,373	Radzinski (2), Malbranque, McBride
27 October 2004	R3	Birmingham City	A	1–0	26,371	Pembridge
10 November 2004	R4	Nottingham Forest	A	4–2 (a.e.t.)	9,252	Radzinski (2), McBride, Cole
30 November 2004	R5	Chelsea	H	1–2	14,531	McBride

=== FA Cup ===
Date	Round	Opponent	Venue	Result	Attendance	Scorers
8 January 2005	R3	Watford	A	1–1	14,896	Knight
19 January 2005	R3R	Watford	H	2–0	11,306	Volz, Radzinski
29 January 2005	R4	Derby County	A	1–1	22,040	John
12 February 2005	R4R	Derby County	H	4–2	15,528	Diop, Boa Morte, John, Jensen
19 February 2005	R5	Bolton Wanderers	A	0–1	16,151	
