= 2003–04 Fulham F.C. season =

Fulham F.C.
2003–04 season
- Chairman: Mohamed Al-Fayed
- Manager: Chris Coleman
- Stadium: Loftus Road
- Premier League: 9th
- FA Cup: Quarter-finals
- League Cup: Second round
- Top goalscorer: League: Louis Saha (13); All: Louis Saha (15)
- Highest home attendance: 25,357 (vs. Chelsea, 1 January 2004)
- Lowest home attendance: 10,500 (vs. Bolton, 26 September 2003)
Home colours	Away colours

The 2003–04 season was Fulham's third consecutive season in the top league of English football, the Barclaycard Premiership. The club was managed by former player Chris Coleman, who replaced Jean Tigana at the end of the 2002–03 season.

Fulham were near the top of the table after the first few months of the season after a great start to the campaign and consistently remained in the top half throughout the course of the season. They ended up finishing in ninth position, only four points behind fifth-placed Newcastle United. It was a great debut season for Chris Coleman as manager, particularly as the club had to cope for half of the season without top goalscorer, Louis Saha, who left for Manchester United.

== Kit and sponsorship ==
Fulham's last deal with kit supplier Adidas came to an end on 11 May 2003. It was announced on June that dabs.com would be the kits sponsor in a two-year agreement. On June it was announced the new kit would be produced by Puma.

== Players ==
=== First-team squad ===
Squad at end of season

Note: Flags indicate national team as defined under FIFA eligibility rules; some limited exceptions apply. Players may hold more than one non-FIFA nationality.

No.	Pos.	Nation	Player
1	GK	NED	Edwin van der Sar
2	DF	GER	Moritz Volz
3	DF	ENG	Jon Harley
5	DF	FRA	Sylvain Legwinski
6	MF	JPN	Junichi Inamoto
7	MF	WAL	Mark Pembridge
8	FW	USA	Brian McBride
9	FW	ARG	Facundo Sava
10	MF	ENG	Lee Clark (captain)
11	FW	POR	Luís Boa Morte
12	GK	WAL	Mark Crossley (Note: Crossley was born in Barnsley, England and represented them at U-21 level, but qualified to represent Wales internationally through his parents and made his international debut for Wales in February 1997.)
14	MF	FRA	Steed Malbranque (Note: Malbranque was born in Mouscron, Belgium, but also qualified to represent France internationally, and represented them at U-21 level before being called up by France in February 2004 without playing.)
15	FW	JAM	Barry Hayles (Note: Hayles was born in Lambeth, England, but also qualified to represent Jamaica internationally and made his international debut for Jamaica in June 2001, having previously represented the Cayman Islands internationally despite being ineligible to do so.)
16	DF	ENG	Zat Knight

No.	Pos.	Nation	Player
17	DF	FRA	Martin Djetou (Note: Djetou was born in Brogohlo, Ivory Coast, but was raised in France and made his international debut for France in 1996.)
18	DF	FRA	Jérôme Bonnissel
22	DF	ENG	Dean Leacock
23	MF	ENG	Sean Davis
24	DF	FRA	Alain Goma
25	DF	ENG	Malik Buari (Note: Buari was born in Accra, Ghana, but also qualified to represent England internationally and represented them at U-15 and U-16 level.)
26	MF	NED	Bobby Petta (on loan from Celtic)
27	FW	LAT	Andrejs Štolcers
28	DF	ENG	Zesh Rehman (Note: Rehman was born in Birmingham, England and represented them at U-18, U-19 and U-20 level, but qualified to represent Pakistan internationally through his parents and would make his international debut for Pakistan in December 2005.)
30	DF	ENG	Adam Green
31	MF	ENG	Darren Pratley
34	DF	USA	Carlos Bocanegra
35	DF	ENG	Ian Pearce
36	FW	NED	Collins John (Note: John was born in Zwedru, Liberia, but also qualified to represent the Netherlands internationally and made his international debut for the Netherlands in August 2004.)

=== Left club during season ===
Note: Flags indicate national team as defined under FIFA eligibility rules; some limited exceptions apply. Players may hold more than one non-FIFA nationality.

No.	Pos.	Nation	Player
4	DF	WAL	Andy Melville (to West Ham United)
7	FW	FRA	Steve Marlet (on loan to Marseille)
8	FW	FRA	Louis Saha (to Manchester United)

No.	Pos.	Nation	Player
26	FW	SKN	Calum Willock (Note: Willock was born in Lambeth, England, but also qualified to represent Saint Kitts and Nevis internationally and made his international debut for Saint Kitts and Nevis in 2004.) (to Peterborough United)
—	GK	NIR	Maik Taylor (Note: Taylor was born in Hildesheim, West Germany (now Germany), but qualified to represent any of the home nations internationally as he holds a British passport, and made his international debut for Northern Ireland in March 1999.) (to Birmingham City)

=== Reserve squad ===
Note: Flags indicate national team as defined under FIFA eligibility rules; some limited exceptions apply. Players may hold more than one non-FIFA nationality.

No.	Pos.	Nation	Player
13	GK	ENG	Ross Flitney
19	FW	GHA	Elvis Hammond
20	DF	ENG	Mark Hudson
21	GK	ENG	Dave Beasant

No.	Pos.	Nation	Player
29	MF	ENG	Sean Doherty
32	MF	ENG	Tom Davis
33	FW	SCO	Stuart Noble
37	DF	ENG	Liam Rosenior

== Statistics ==
=== Appearances and goals ===
No.	Pos	Nat	Player	Total		Premier League		FA Cup		League Cup	
No.	Pos	Nat	Player	Apps	Goals	Apps	Goals	Apps	Goals	Apps	Goals
Goalkeepers
1	GK	(Netherlands) NED	Edwin van der Sar	43	0	37	0	6	0	0	0
12	GK	(Wales) WAL	Mark Crossley	2	0	1	0	0	0	1	0
Defenders
2	DF	(Germany) GER	Moritz Volz	38	0	32+1	0	5	0	0	0
3	DF	(England) ENG	Jon Harley	4	0	3+1	0	0	0	0	0
16	DF	(England) ENG	Zat Knight	37	0	30+1	0	5+1	0	0	0
17	DF	(France) FRA	Martin Djetou	31	0	19+7	0	4	0	1	0
18	DF	(France) FRA	Jérôme Bonnissel	16	0	16	0	0	0	0	0
22	DF	(England) ENG	Dean Leacock	5	0	3+1	0	0	0	1	0
24	DF	(France) FRA	Alain Goma	29	0	23	0	6	0	0	0
28	DF	(England) ENG	Zesh Rehman	2	0	0+1	0	0	0	0+1	0
30	DF	(England) ENG	Adam Green	7	0	4	0	2	0	1	0
34	DF	(United States) USA	Carlos Bocanegra	19	0	15	0	4	0	0	0
35	DF	(England) ENG	Ian Pearce	13	0	12+1	0	0	0	0	0
Midfielders
5	MF	(France) FRA	Sylvain Legwinski	37	0	30+2	0	4	0	1	0
6	MF	(Japan) JPN	Junichi Inamoto	25	3	15+7	2	2	1	1	0
7	MF	(Wales) WAL	Mark Pembridge	15	1	9+3	1	0+2	0	1	0
10	MF	(England) ENG	Lee Clark	27	2	25	2	2	0	0	0
14	MF	(France) FRA	Steed Malbranque	44	8	38	6	6	2	0	0
23	MF	(England) ENG	Sean Davis	30	6	22+2	5	6	1	0	0
25	MF	(England) ENG	Malik Buari	4	0	1+2	0	0	0	1	0
26	MF	(Netherlands) NED	Bobby Petta	14	0	3+6	0	2+3	0	0	0
27	MF	(Latvia) LAT	Andrejs Štolcers	1	0	0	0	0	0	1	0
31	MF	(England) ENG	Darren Pratley	2	0	0+1	0	0	0	0+1	0
Forwards
8	FW	(United States) USA	Brian McBride	19	5	5+11	4	3	1	0	0
9	FW	(Argentina) ARG	Facundo Sava	9	1	0+6	1	0+2	0	1	0
11	FW	(Portugal) POR	Luís Boa Morte	39	10	32+1	9	5	1	0+1	0
15	FW	(Jamaica) JAM	Barry Hayles	32	5	10+16	4	3+3	1	0	0
36	FW	(Netherlands) NED	Collins John	8	4	3+5	4	0	0	0	0
Players transferred out during the season
4	DF	(Wales) WAL	Andy Melville	11	0	9	0	0+1	0	1	0
7	FW	(France) FRA	Steve Marlet	1	1	1	1	0	0	0	0
8	FW	(France) FRA	Louis Saha	22	15	20+1	13	1	2	0	0

Last updated: 31 June 2004
Source: Competitions

== Transfers ==
=== Summer ===
==== In ====
Note: Flags indicate national team as defined under FIFA eligibility rules; some limited exceptions apply. Players may hold more than one non-FIFA nationality.

No.	Pos.	Nation	Player
—	GK	ENG	Dave Beasant (from Brighton & Hove Albion – free)
—	DF	FRA	Jérôme Bonnissel (from Rangers – free)
—	DF	GER	Moritz Volz (on 4 month loan from Arsenal)

No.	Pos.	Nation	Player
—	GK	WAL	Mark Crossley (from Middlesbrough – £500,000)
—	MF	WAL	Mark Pembridge (from Everton – undisclosed)
—	DF	ENG	Liam Rosenior (from Bristol City – undisclosed)

==== Out ====
Note: Flags indicate national team as defined under FIFA eligibility rules; some limited exceptions apply. Players may hold more than one non-FIFA nationality.

No.	Pos.	Nation	Player
—	MF	SCO	John Collins (retired)
—	FW	ENG	Luke Cornwall (released)
—	MF	DEN	Bjarne Goldbæk (released)
—	DF	IRL	Steve Finnan (to Liverpool – undisclosed)
—	GK	ARG	Martín Herrera (on season-long loan to Estudiantes La Plata)
—	DF	MAR	Abdeslam Ouaddou (on season-long loan to Rennes)

No.	Pos.	Nation	Player
—	GK	NIR	Maik Taylor (on season-long loan to Birmingham City)
—	FW	GHA	Elvis Hammond (on month-long loan to Norwich City)
—	DF	ENG	Mark Hudson (on month-long loan to Oldham Athletic)
—	FW	FRA	Steve Marlet (on season-long loan to Marseille)
—	DF	ENG	Jon Harley (on month-long loan to Sheffield United)

=== January ===
==== In ====
Note: Flags indicate national team as defined under FIFA eligibility rules; some limited exceptions apply. Players may hold more than one non-FIFA nationality.

No.	Pos.	Nation	Player
—	MF	NED	Bobby Petta (on loan from Celtic for season)
—	DF	USA	Carlos Bocanegra (from Chicago Fire – free)
—	DF	GER	Moritz Volz (from Arsenal – undisclosed)

No.	Pos.	Nation	Player
—	DF	ENG	Ian Pearce (from West Ham United – undisclosed)
—	FW	USA	Brian McBride (from Columbus Crew – free)
—	FW	NED	Collins John (from Twente – undisclosed)

==== Out ====
Note: Flags indicate national team as defined under FIFA eligibility rules; some limited exceptions apply. Players may hold more than one non-FIFA nationality.

No.	Pos.	Nation	Player
—	DF	ENG	Mark Hudson (on three-month-long loan to Crystal Palace)
—	DF	ENG	Jon Harley (on three-month loan to West Ham United)
—	DF	WAL	Andy Melville (to West Ham United – nominal)

No.	Pos.	Nation	Player
—	FW	FRA	Louis Saha (to Manchester United – £12,820,000)
—	GK	NIR	Maik Taylor (to Birmingham City – £1,500,000)

== Club ==
=== Management ===
Position	Staff
Manager	(Wales) Chris Coleman
Assistant manager	(Scotland) Steve Kean
Goalkeeping coach	(England) Dave Beasant
Head of Youth Development	(England) John Murtough
Secretary	(England) Mark Maunders

Source: Fulham FC

=== Other information ===
Chairman	(Egypt) Mohamed Al Fayed
Ground (capacity and dimensions)	Loftus Road (19,148 / 112x72 yards)

Source: Fulham article on 15 August 2007

- Fulham used Queens Park Rangers' ground whilst Craven Cottage was being redeveloped

== Competitions ==
=== Premier League ===
Pos	Team	Pld	W	D	L	GF	GA	GD	Pts	Qualification or relegation
7	Charlton Athletic	38	14	11	13	51	51	0	53	
8	Bolton Wanderers	38	14	11	13	48	56	−8	53	
9	Fulham	38	14	10	14	52	46	+6	52	
10	Birmingham City	38	12	14	12	43	48	−5	50	
11	Middlesbrough	38	13	9	16	44	52	−8	48	Qualification for the UEFA Cup first round (Note: Middlesbrough qualified as the 2003–04 Football League Cup winners.)

Source: Premier League
Rules for classification: 1) points; 2) goal difference; 3) number of goals scored.

=== Season statistics ===
Total Goals: 1012
Average Goals per game: 2.66

== Matches ==
=== Pre-season friendlies ===
12 July 2003	Torquay United	1–4	Fulham	Plainmoor, Torquay
	Gritton 32'	Report	Buari 23'; Sava 55'; Saha 69', 76'	Attendance: 1 896

17 July 2003	Fulham	1–2	Celtic	Loftus Road, Fulham, London
	Sava 59'	Report	Petrov 8'; Larsson 12'	Attendance: 14 247

23 July 2003	ASK Voitsberg	1–4	Fulham	Stadium Sportscentre Voitsberg, Voitsberg
	Walther Eccher 73' (pen.)	Report	Sava 8'; Marlet 24'; Hammond 36'; Saha 68' (pen.)	Attendance: 400

26 July 2003	Roma	2–1	Fulham	Franz Fekete Stadium, Kapfenberg
	Cassano 26'; Bombardini 88'	Report	Saha 27'	Attendance: 4 000

2 August 2003	Motherwell	2–2	Fulham	Fir Park, Motherwell
	Burns 40' (pen.), 89'	Report	Saha 18'; Marlet 60'	Referee: Eddie Mack

5 August 2003	Livingston	2–0	Fulham	Almondvale Stadium, Livingston
	Pasquinelli 23', 31'	Report		Attendance: 2 846; Referee: John Underhill

10 August 2003	Fulham	2–1	Mallorca	Loftus Road, London
	Boa Morte 32'; Malbranque 65'	Report	Eto'o 12'	Attendance: 2,489; Referee: Paul Durkin

== Results ==
=== Premier League ===
16 August 2003 1	Fulham	3–2	Middlesbrough	White City, London
15:00 BST	Marlet 81'; Inamoto 56'; Saha 70'	Report	Marinelli 10'; Nemeth 81'	Stadium: Loftus Road; Attendance: 14,546; Referee: Graham Poll

23 August 2003 2	Everton	3–1	Fulham	Liverpool, Merseyside
15:00 BST	Naysmith 7'; Unsworth 20' Watson 35'	Report	Hayles 69'	Stadium: Goodison Park; Attendance: 37,604; Referee: Neale Barry

30 August 2003 3	Tottenham Hotspur	0–3	Fulham	Tottenham, London
15:00 BST		Report	Hayles 23', 67'; Boa Morte 71'	Stadium: White Hart Lane; Attendance: 33,421; Referee: Jeff Winter

14 September 2003 4	Birmingham City	2–2	Fulham	Birmingham, West Midlands
16:05 BST	Mikael Forssell 45', 82'; Purse (red card) 82'	Report	Saha 1'; Boa Morte 78'; Legwinski (red card) 60'	Stadium: St. Andrews; Attendance: 27,250; Referee: Steve Dunn

20 September 2003 5	Fulham	2-2	Manchester City	White City, London
15:00 BST	Malbranque 73'; Saha 79'	Report	Knight 31' (o.g.); Wanchope 90+3'	Stadium: Loftus Road; Attendance: 16,124; Referee: Phil Dowd

28 September 2003 6	Blackburn Rovers	0–2	Fulham	Blackburn, Lancashire
12:00 BST		Report	Boa Morte 5'; Saha 56'	Stadium: Ewood Park; Attendance: 21,985; Referee: Matt Messias

4 October 2003 7	Fulham	2–0	Leicester City	White City, London
15:00 BST	Boa Morte 36', 73'	Report		Stadium: Loftus Road; Attendance: 14,612; Referee: Chris Foy

18 October 2003 8	Fulham	0–0	Wolverhampton Wanderers	White City, London
15:00 BST		Report		Stadium: Loftus Road; Attendance: 17,031; Referee: Howard Webb

21 October 2003 9	Fulham	2–3	Newcastle United	White City, London
19:45 BST	Clark 6'; Saha 8'	Report	Robert 16'; Shearer 51' (pen.), 56'	Stadium: Loftus Road; Attendance: 15,241; Referee: Barry Knight

25 October 2003 10	Manchester United	1–3	Fulham	Manchester, Greater Manchester
	Forlan 45+2'	Report	Clark 3'; Malbranque 66'; Inamoto 79'	Stadium: Old Trafford; Attendance: 67,727; Referee: Mike Riley

2 November 2003 11	Fulham	1–2	Liverpool	White City, London
	Saha 43'; Boa Morte (red card) 90'	Report	Heskey 17'; Murphy 89' (pen.)	Stadium: Loftus Road; Attendance: 17,682; Referee: Rob Styles

8 November 2003 12	Charlton Athletic	3–1	Fulham	Charlton, London
	Stuart 10'; Johansson 69', 76'	Report	Davis 89'	Stadium: The Valley; Attendance: 26,285; Referee: Andy D'Urso

24 November 2003 13	Fulham	2–0	Portsmouth	White City, London
	Saha 30', 33'	Report	Berger (red card) 82'	Stadium: Loftus Road; Attendance: 15,624; Referee: Alan Wiley

30 November 2003 14	Arsenal	0–0	Fulham	Highbury, London
		Report		Stadium: Highbury; Attendance: 38,063; Referee: Graham Barber

6 December 2003 15	Fulham	2–1	Bolton Wanderers	White City, London
	Davis 75'; Sava 76'	Report	Davies 53'	Stadium: Loftus Road; Attendance: 14,393; Referee: Andy D'Urso

14 December 2003 16	Leeds United	3–2	Fulham	Leeds, West Yorkshire
	Duberry 41'; Viduka 46'; Matteo 88'	Report	Saha 47', 85'	Stadium: Elland Road; Attendance: 30,544; Referee: Neale Barry

20 December 2003 17	Fulham	0–1	Chelsea	White City, London
		Report	Crespo 62'	Stadium: Loftus Road; Attendance: 18,431; Referee: Mike Riley

26 December 2003 18	Fulham	2–0	Southampton	White City, London
	Saha 19', 62' (pen.)	Report		Stadium: Loftus Road; Attendance: 15,640; Referee: Dermot Gallagher

28 December 2003 19	Aston Villa	3–0	Fulham	Birmingham, West Midlands
	Angel 32'; Vassell 67', 82'	Report		Stadium: Villa Park; Attendance: 35,617; Referee: Barry Knight

7 January 2004 20	Middlesbrough	2–1	Fulham	Middlesbrough North Yorkshire
	Job 14'; Nemeth 67'	Report	Hayles 90+2'	Stadium: Riverside Stadium; Attendance: 27,869; Referee: Paul Durkin

10 January 2004 21	Fulham	2–1	Everton	White City, London, London
	Saha 45' (pen.); Malbranque 46'	Report	Kilbane 81'	Stadium: Loftus Road; Attendance: 17,308; Referee: Graham Poll

19 January 2004 22	Newcastle United	3–1	Fulham	Newcastle upon Tyne, Tyne and Wear
	O'Brien 4'; Speed 41'; Robert 54'	Report	Davis 74'	Stadium: St James' Park; Attendance: 50,104; Referee: Neale Barry

31 January 2004 23	Fulham	2–1	Tottenham Hotspur	White City, London
	Malbranque 45+2' (pen.); McBride 66'	Report	Keane 18' (pen.)	Stadium: Loftus Road; Attendance: 17,024; Referee: Matt Messias

7 February 2004 24	Southampton	0–0	Fulham	Southampton, Hampshire
		Report		Stadium: St Mary's; Attendance: 31,820; Referee: Andy D'Urso

11 February 2004 25	Fulham	1–2	Aston Villa	White City, London
	Boa Morte 1'; Bocanegra (red card) 74'	Report	Angel 13'	Stadium: Loftus Road; Attendance: 16,153; Referee: Barry Knight

21 February 2004 26	Wolverhampton Wanderers	2–1	Fulham	Wolverhampton, West Midlands
	Ince 20'; Cort 51'	Report	Malbranque 83'	Stadium: Molineux; Attendance: 28,424; Referee: Howard Webb

28 February 2004 27	Fulham	1–1	Manchester United	White City, London
	Boa Morte 64'	Report	Saha 14'	Stadium: Loftus Road; Attendance: 18,306; Referee: Alan Wiley

13 March 2004 28	Fulham	2–0	Leeds United	White City, London
	Davis 71'; Boa Morte 83'	Report		Stadium: Loftus Road; Attendance: 17,104; Referee: Steve Dunn

20 March 2004 29	Chelsea	2–1	Fulham	Fulham, London
	Gudjohnsen 7'; Duff 30'	Report	Pembridge 18'	Stadium: Stamford Bridge; Attendance: 41,459; Referee: Neale Barry

27 March 2004 30	Manchester City	0–0	Fulham	Manchester, Greater Manchester
		Report		Stadium: City of Manchester Stadium; Attendance: 46,522; Referee: Jeff Winter

3 April 2004 31	Fulham	0–0	Birmingham City	White City, London
		Report		Stadium: Loftus Road; Attendance: 14,667; Referee: Mike Riley

10 April 2004 32	Leicester City	0–2	Fulham	Leicester, Leicestershire
		Report	John 65', 89'	Stadium: Walkers Stadium; Attendance: 28,392; Referee: Peter Walton

12 April 2004 33	Fulham	3–4	Blackburn Rovers	White City, London
	John 26', 45+2'; Boa Morte 60'	Report	Cole 23'; Douglas 48'; Amoruso 51'; Stead 74'	Stadium: Loftus Road; Attendance: 13,981; Referee: Steve Bennett

17 April 2004 34	Liverpool	0–0	Fulham	Liverpool, Merseyside
		Report		Stadium: Anfield; Attendance: 42,042; Referee: Steve Bennett

24 April 2004 35	Fulham	2–0	Charlton Athletic	White City, London
	Malbranque 18' (pen.); Davis 64'	Report		Stadium: Loftus Road; Attendance: 16,585; Referee: Matt Messias

1 May 2004 36	Portsmouth	1–1	Fulham	Portsmouth, Hampshire
	Yakubu 80'	Report	McBride 84'	Stadium: Fratton Park; Attendance: 20,056; Referee: Steve Dunn

9 May 2004 37	Fulham	0–1	Arsenal	White City, London
		Report	Reyes 9'	Stadium: Loftus Road; Attendance: 18,102; Referee: Mike Dean

15 May 2004 38	Bolton Wanderers	0–2	Fulham	Bolton, Lancashire
		Report	McBride 44', 78'	Stadium: Reebok Stadium; Attendance: 27,383; Referee: Graham Barber

=== League Cup ===
23 September 2003 2nd Round	Wigan Athletic	1–0	Fulham	Wigan, Lancashire
	Ellington 73'	Report		Stadium: JJB Stadium; Attendance: 4,874; Referee: Alan Kaye

=== FA Cup ===
4 January 2004 3rd Round	Fulham	2–1	Cheltenham Town	White City, London
	Saha 13', 90'	Report	McCann 5'	Stadium: Loftus Road; Attendance: 10,303; Referee: Peter Walton

25 January 2004 4th Round	Everton	1–1	Fulham	Liverpool, Merseyside
	Jeffers 90'	Report	Davis 49'	Stadium: Goodison Park; Attendance: 27,862; Referee: Dermot Gallagher

4 February 2004 4th Round Replay	Fulham	2–1	Everton	White City, London
	Inamoto 57'; Malbranque 102'	Report	Jeffers 90'	Stadium: Loftus Road; Attendance: 11,551; Referee: Paul Durkin

14 February 2004 5th Round	Fulham	0–0	West Ham United	White City, London
		Report		Stadium: Loftus Road; Attendance: 14,705; Referee: Graham Poll

24 February 2004 5th Round Replay	West Ham United	0–3	Fulham	Upton Park, London
		Report	McBride 76'; Hayles 79'; Boa Morte 90'	Stadium: Upton Park; Attendance: 27,934; Referee: Mike Riley

6 March 2004 Quarter Final	Manchester United	2–1	Fulham	Manchester, Greater Manchester
	Van Nistelrooy 25', 62'	Report	Malbranque 23' (pen.)	Stadium: Old Trafford; Attendance: 67,614; Referee: Rob Styles
