= Moritz Volz =

German footballer (born 1983)

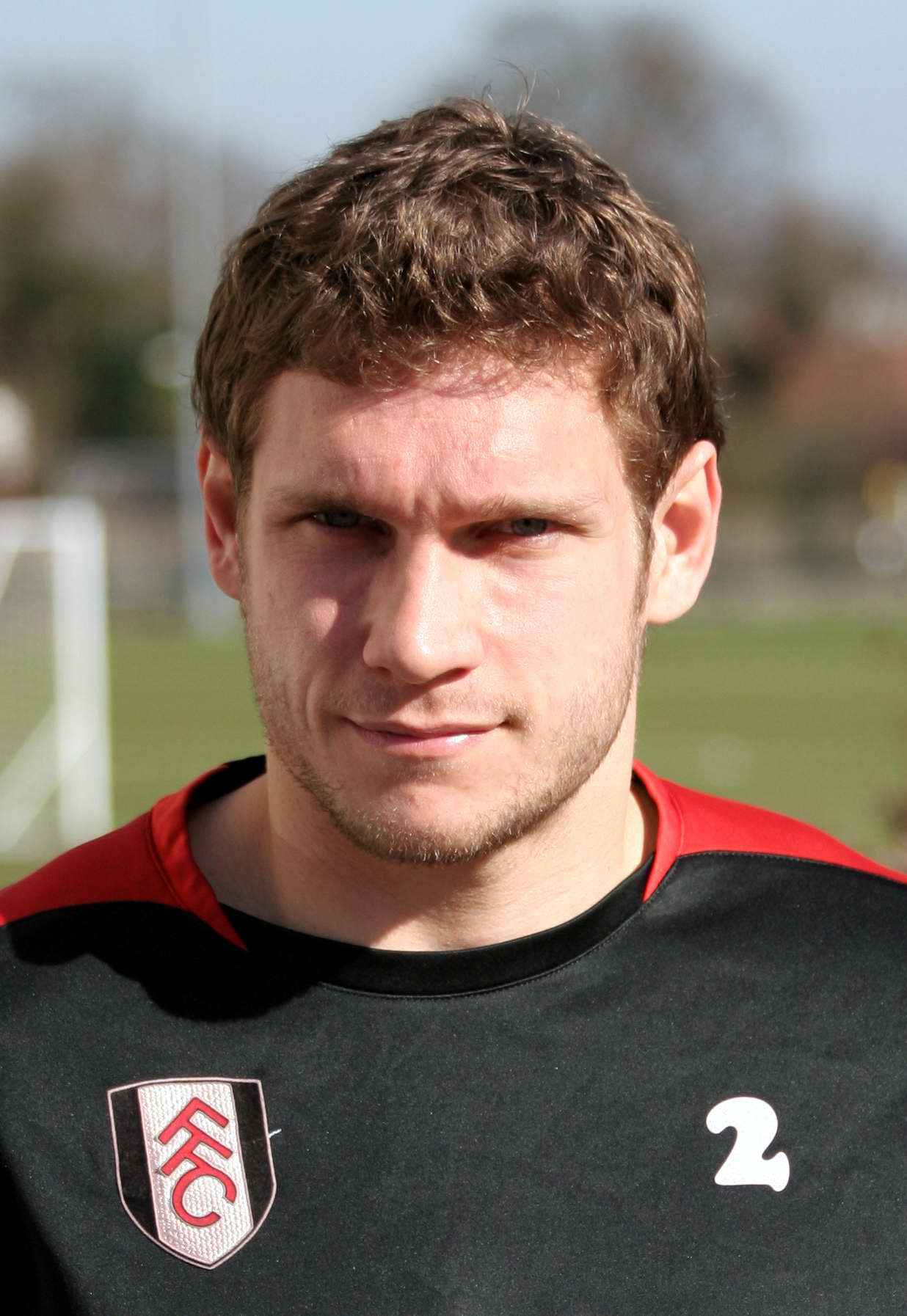
- Volz at Fulham in 2007

Personal information
- Date of birth: 21 January 1983 (age 43)
- Place of birth: Siegen, West Germany
- Height: 1.78 m (5 ft 10 in)
- Position: Right-back

Youth career
- SpVgg Bürbach
- –1999: Schalke 04
- 1999–2000: Arsenal

Senior career*
Years	Team	Apps	(Gls)
2000–2004	Arsenal	0	(0)
2003	→ Wimbledon (loan)	10	(1)
2004–2009	Fulham	125	(2)
2008–2009	→ Ipswich Town (loan)	22	(0)
2010–2012	FC St. Pauli	23	(2)
2012–2015	1860 Munich	45	(0)
Total		225	(5)

International career
2003–2006	Germany U21	20	(0)
- * Club domestic league appearances and goals

Moritz Volz (born 21 January 1983) is a German former professional footballer, media pundit and scout. He played as a right-back with Schalke 04, Arsenal, Wimbledon, Fulham, Ipswich Town, FC St. Pauli and 1860 Munich.

== Club career ==
=== Early career ===
Volz was born in Siegen and started his career in his native Germany at Schalke 04, before being spotted by Arsenal while playing for the German youth team. He was offered a contract and joined the Gunners in the summer of 1999. Volz's debut for the Gunners came in a League Cup defeat to Ipswich Town in 2000. With the club's academy, Volz also won the FA Youth Cup in 2000 and 2001. He made another appearance for Arsenal's first team a year later in a League Cup defeat to Sunderland. In February 2003, he was loaned out to Wimbledon, where he impressed by scoring on his debut against Brighton and going on to make nine further appearances for the Dons. He returned from loan in the summer of the same year before joining Fulham, again on loan, in August 2003. The move was made permanent in January 2004.

=== Fulham ===
At Fulham, Volz attained cult-figure status with the fans, in part due to his commitment, passion and community involvement. He was also popular with the club's faithful given that he rode his bicycle to home games. He had several nicknames at Craven Cottage, such as '220 Volz', 'The Electrician', 'Mr Resistor', 'The Hoff' due to his adulation of David Hasselhoff, 'The Lightbulb' and the rather simple 'Volzy'. For the match against Aston Villa on Saturday 21 October 2006, he had 'The Hoff' written on his boots for good luck and promptly scored his first goal in three years.

Volz signed a contract extension on 9 December 2006, which kept him at the club until 2009. On 30 December 2006, he went on to score the 15,000th goal in Premier League history for Fulham against Chelsea. Inevitably, this feat gave birth to the new nickname '15,000 Volz'. As he scored that goal, Volz donated £15,000 to three charitable organisations: Kick 4 Life, The Prince's Trust, and Fulham Football Club's Community charity. In July 2008, Volz was awarded PPF Community Champion Award, which is associated with The Observer newspaper.

On 28 August 2008, he signed for Championship side Ipswich Town on a season-long loan deal. Volz joined the club as he hoped to help the Tractor Boys get promoted to the Premier League. Altogether, he was capped a total of 22 times for the club.

On 1 July 2009, he was released from Fulham as he came to the end of his contract and was so praised by the club for his loyal service. Volz sent a farewell message to Fulham supporters upon the club's website. While on the lookout for a new team, he kept training with the club to maintain his fitness and also did media work for Sky Sports at the 2009 UEFA European Under-21 Championship.

On 2 January 2010, Volz got a trial with former club Schalke 04. He joined the team at Chiclana de la Frontera for a training camp.

He then trained with Queens Park Rangers, and in March 2010, was offered a short-term deal until the end of the season. Volz did not accept this contract offer.

=== FC St. Pauli ===
Volz eventually joined up with FC St. Pauli on 15 June 2010, signing a two-year contract. He made his debut on 5 November 2010 against Schalke 04.

=== 1860 Munich ===
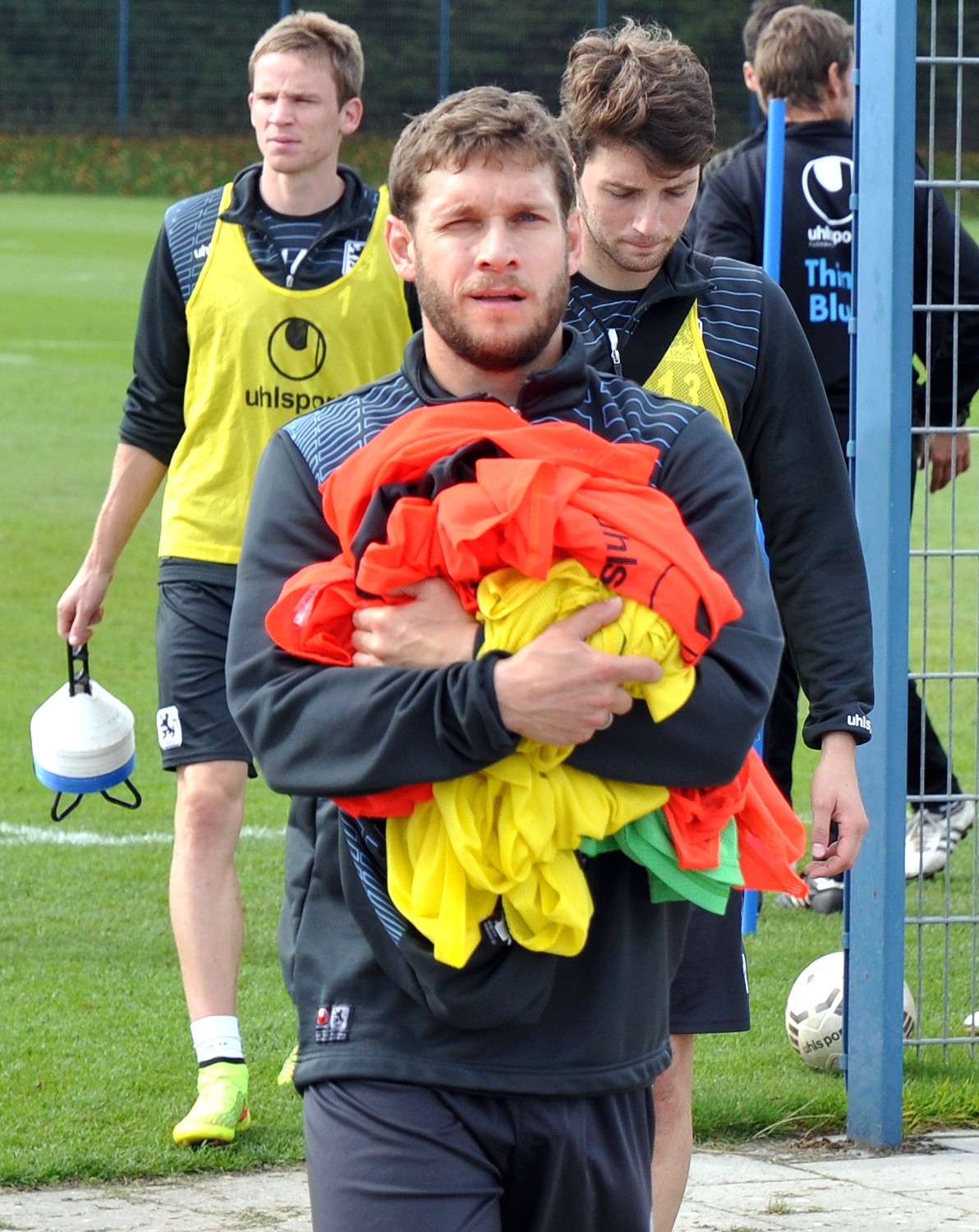
Volz whilst training with 1860 Munich

Volz joined 1860 Munich on 5 June 2012, signing a three-year contract. At 1860 Munich he won the 2014–15 2. Bundesliga relegation playoffs, with the club thus staying within the league.

== International career ==
Although Volz was not part of the German team that reached the semi-finals of the World Cup on home soil in 2006, he was an ever-present force in Dieter Eilts' successful under-21 side. He helped the team qualify for the European Championships in summer 2006. Volz was included in the senior squad for the 17 November 2004 game in Leipzig against Cameroon but did not appear on the field.

== Scouting and media work ==
Volz wrote for The Times and worked as a pundit for Sky Sports, Setanta Sports and ITV while playing in the UK. He later worked as a colour commentator for DAZN in Germany.

After his retirement in the summer of 2015 Volz worked in 1860 Munich's youth department. He was later a scout for Arsenal.

== Career statistics ==
Appearances and goals by club, season and competition
Club	Season	League			National cup (Note: Includes FA Cup, DFB-Pokal)		League cup (Note: Includes Football League Cup)		Total	
Club	Season	Division	Apps	Goals	Apps	Goals	Apps	Goals	Apps	Goals
Arsenal	2001–02	Premier League	0	0	0	0	1	0	1	0
Arsenal	2002–03	Premier League	0	0	0	0	1	0	1	0
Arsenal	Total		0	0	0	0	2	0	2	0
Wimbledon (loan)	2002–03	First Division	10	1	0	0	0	0	10	1
Fulham	2003–04	Premier League	33	0	5	0	0	0	38	0
Fulham	2004–05	Premier League	31	0	2	1	3	0	36	1
Fulham	2005–06	Premier League	23	0	0	0	1	0	24	0
Fulham	2006–07	Premier League	29	2	4	1	1	0	34	3
Fulham	2007–08	Premier League	9	0	2	0	1	0	12	0
Fulham	Total		125	2	13	2	6	0	144	4
Ipswich Town (loan)	2008–09	Championship	22	0	0	0	1	0	23	0
FC St. Pauli	2010–11	Bundesliga	9	0	0	0	—		9	0
FC St. Pauli	2011–12	2. Bundesliga	14	2	0	0	—		14	2
FC St. Pauli	Total		23	2	0	0	—		23	2
1860 Munich	2012–13	2. Bundesliga	26	0	3	0	—		29	0
1860 Munich	2013–14	2. Bundesliga	17	0	2	0	—		19	0
1860 Munich	2014–15	2. Bundesliga	2	0	1	0	—		3	0
1860 Munich	Total		45	0	6	0	—		51	0
Career total			225	5	19	2	9	0	253	7

== Honours ==
Arsenal

- FA Youth Cup: 1999–2000, 2000–01
