= Zat Knight =

English footballer (born 1980)

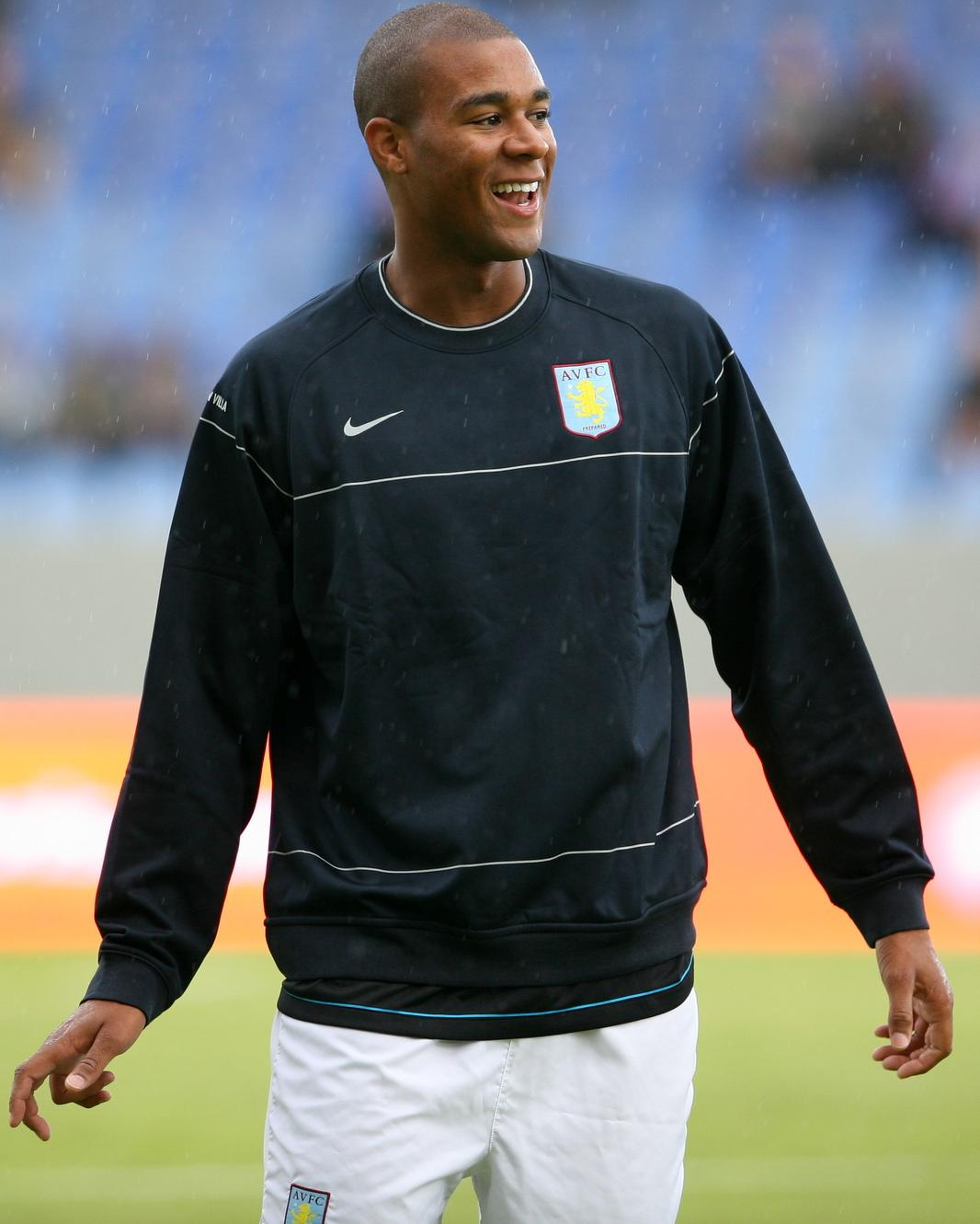
- Knight training with Aston Villa in 2008

Personal information
- Full name: Zatyiah Knight
- Date of birth: 2 May 1980 (age 46)
- Place of birth: Solihull, England
- Height: 6 ft 6 in (1.98 m)
- Position: Centre back

Senior career*
| Years | Team | Apps | (Gls) |
| –1999 | Rushall Olympic | | |
| 1999–2007 | Fulham | 150 | (3) |
| 2000 | → Peterborough United (loan) | 8 | (0) |
| 2007–2009 | Aston Villa | 40 | (4) |
| 2009–2014 | Bolton Wanderers | 168 | (4) |
| 2014–2015 | Colorado Rapids | 4 | (0) |
| 2015 | Reading | 2 | (0) |
| Total | | 372 | (11) |

International career
| 2002 | England U21 | 4 | (0) |
| 2005 | England | 2 | (0) |
- * Club domestic league appearances and goals

Zatyiah Knight (born 2 May 1980) is an English former professional footballer who played as a centre back.

Knight had extended spells at Aston Villa, Bolton Wanderers and Fulham in the Premier League and the Championship. He finished his career at Reading in the Championship. Knight represented England at under-21 and senior international levels.

== Club career ==
=== Fulham ===
Knight was born in Newtown, Birmingham, West Midlands. Fulham signed him from Rushall Olympic on 19 February 1999. As Knight was not a professionally contracted player to Olympic, Fulham were not obliged to pay a fee for him, but owner Mohamed Al-Fayed sent the club 30 tracksuits as a gesture of thanks. After five years at Fulham, Knight signed a contract extension that would keep him at Craven Cottage until 2008, having established himself under Chris Coleman's management.

Knight scored four goals for Fulham, two in the 2004–05 season and two in 2006–07. The first was in a FA Cup match against Watford in a 1–1 draw, his second was a Premier League goal against Norwich City in a 6–0 win. His last goal for Fulham came against Bolton Wanderers in a 2–1 loss. He was arguably Fulham's most consistent player in 2006–07, a reward for this was being given temporary captaincy of the club while regular skipper Luís Boa Morte was out injured.

Before a match against West Ham United, it was announced that he had broken his jaw in two places while messing around with his brother. Chris Coleman has been quoted as saying that it takes more than horseplay to break one's jaw in two places, but Knight insists there was "nothing sinister" about the incident.

At the start of 2007–08, Knight signed a two-year contract extension with Fulham, contracting him until the summer of 2010. Prior to signing a new contract, Knight was linked with a move away from Fulham, but insisted he wanted to stay at the club and win trophies.

=== Aston Villa ===
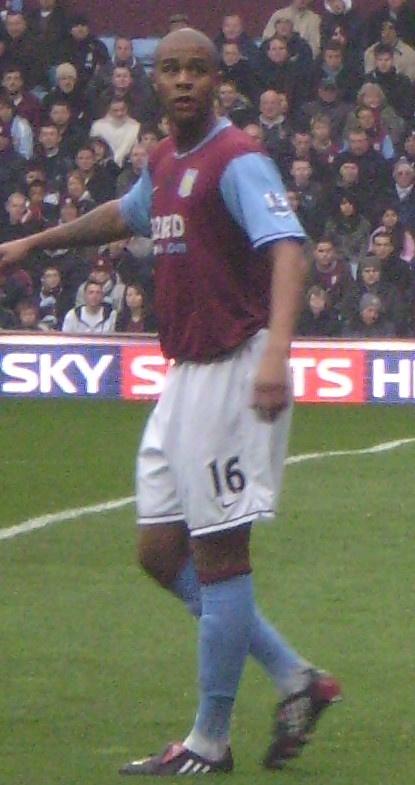
Knight playing for Aston Villa in 2008

On 29 August 2007, Knight signed a four-year contract with the club he supported as a boy, Aston Villa, for a £3.5 million fee. His last Fulham match was the 2–1 defeat against Villa, in which he played a part in Villa's equaliser when an Ashley Young shot deflected off him into the net, although this was later given as Young's goal. In the early hours of the day of his transfer (29 August), Knight and his brother Carlos were arrested in a drugs raid on their family home. Knight was released on police bail while Carlos was remanded in custody. Police said that a quantity of drugs were seized at the home. Knight feared that he might miss the press conference announcing his signing but his agent bailed him out and no mention of the incident was made at the press conference. Knight scored a headed goal on his Villa debut in a 2–0 win against Chelsea on 2 September 2007. Knight's next goal for Villa did not come until the following season, on 26 December 2008, when Villa were trailing 2–1 against Arsenal at Villa Park. Knight scored the equaliser in the 91st minute of the match, in front of the Holte End, to make it 2–2.

=== Bolton Wanderers ===
On 25 July 2009, Knight signed a three-year contract with Premier League club Bolton Wanderers for an undisclosed fee, believed to be in the region of £4 million. Knight made his Bolton debut in the 1–0 defeat to Sunderland on 15 August 2009. He scored his first goal against Wolverhampton Wanderers at the Reebok Stadium on 27 February 2010 and this led to a crucial 1–0 home win which lifted the team out of the relegation zone.

Knight's contract expired at the end of 2011–12, making him a free agent. However, on 9 July 2012, Bolton announced that he had signed a further two-year contract. Knight often took the captain's armband at Bolton when usual skipper Kevin Davies was off the pitch. When Davies left at the end of 2012–13, Knight was named as the new captain for 2013–14. Jay Spearing took the armband when Knight came out of the team and Spearing retained it when Knight returned. On 8 March 2014, Knight scored his first goal in three and a half years when scoring Bolton's third in their 5–1 victory over Leeds United at Elland Road. At the end of that season, he was released by the club along with Chris Eagles, Tyrone Mears and Jay Lynch.

=== Colorado Rapids and Reading ===
On 1 October 2014, Knight signed for Major League Soccer team Colorado Rapids. He played all four of their remaining matches of the season as they finished outside the play-offs, and had his contract terminated by mutual consent on 2 February 2015.

Following his release from the Rapids, Knight went on trial with Watford, before signing with fellow Championship club Reading on 12 March 2015. He was released by Reading on 21 May 2015.

== International career ==
Knight made his England debut on 28 May 2005 as a substitute against the United States in a friendly match. He gained his second cap in a friendly against Colombia on 31 May.

== Post-retirement life ==
After Knight retired, he moved to Los Angeles. He runs a real estate investment company, and also owns a fragrance line.

== Career statistics ==
=== Club ===
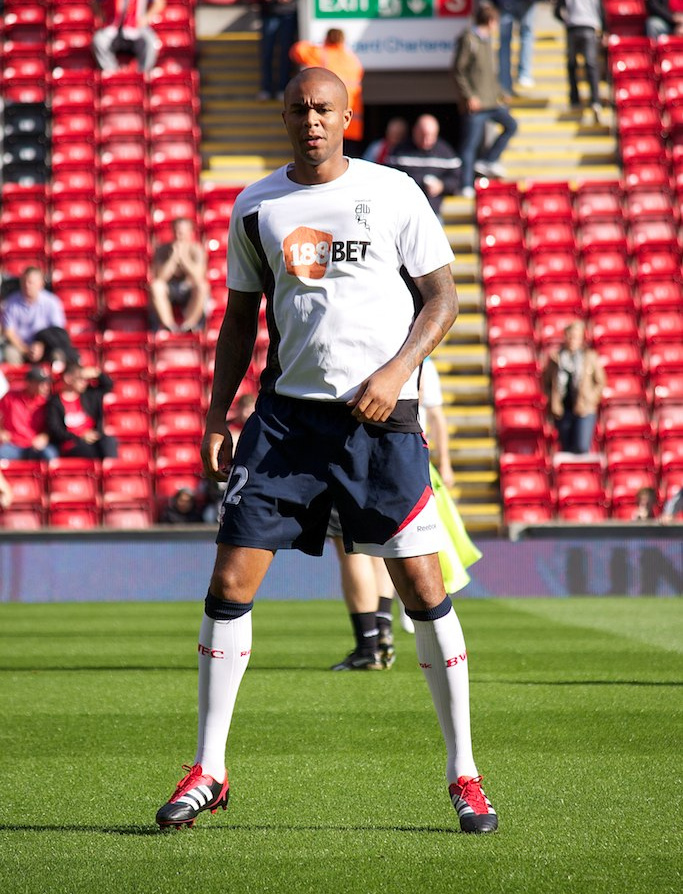
Knight training with Bolton Wanderers in 2011

Appearances and goals by club, season and competition
| Club | Season | League | | | FA Cup | | League Cup | | Europe | | Total | |
| Club | Season | Division | Apps | Goals | Apps | Goals | Apps | Goals | Apps | Goals | Apps | Goals |
|---|---|---|---|---|---|---|---|---|---|---|---|---|
| Fulham | 1999–2000 | First Division | 0 | 0 | 0 | 0 | 0 | 0 | — | | 0 | 0 |
| Fulham | 2000–01 | First Division | 0 | 0 | 0 | 0 | 3 | 0 | — | | 3 | 0 |
| Fulham | 2001–02 | Premier League | 10 | 0 | 3 | 0 | 2 | 0 | — | | 15 | 0 |
| Fulham | 2002–03 | Premier League | 17 | 0 | 1 | 0 | 1 | 0 | 5 (Note: Four appearances in UEFA Intertoto Cup, one in UEFA Cup) | 0 | 24 | 0 |
| Fulham | 2003–04 | Premier League | 31 | 0 | 6 | 0 | 0 | 0 | — | | 37 | 0 |
| Fulham | 2004–05 | Premier League | 35 | 1 | 5 | 1 | 2 | 0 | — | | 42 | 2 |
| Fulham | 2005–06 | Premier League | 30 | 0 | 1 | 0 | 1 | 0 | — | | 32 | 0 |
| Fulham | 2006–07 | Premier League | 23 | 2 | 1 | 0 | 0 | 0 | — | | 24 | 2 |
| Fulham | 2007–08 | Premier League | 4 | 0 | — | | — | | — | | 4 | 0 |
| Fulham | Total | | 150 | 3 | 17 | 1 | 9 | 0 | 5 | 0 | 181 | 4 |
| Peterborough United (loan) | 1999–2000 | Third Division | 8 | 0 | — | | — | | — | | 8 | 0 |
| Aston Villa | 2007–08 | Premier League | 27 | 1 | 0 | 0 | 1 | 0 | — | | 28 | 1 |
| Aston Villa | 2008–09 | Premier League | 13 | 1 | 3 | 0 | 1 | 0 | 9 (Note: Two appearances in UEFA Intertoto Cup, seven in UEFA Cup) | 0 | 26 | 1 |
| Aston Villa | Total | | 40 | 2 | 3 | 0 | 2 | 0 | 9 | 0 | 54 | 2 |
| Bolton Wanderers | 2009–10 | Premier League | 35 | 1 | 3 | 0 | 3 | 0 | — | | 41 | 1 |
| Bolton Wanderers | 2010–11 | Premier League | 34 | 1 | 3 | 0 | 2 | 0 | — | | 39 | 1 |
| Bolton Wanderers | 2011–12 | Premier League | 25 | 0 | 2 | 0 | 2 | 0 | — | | 29 | 0 |
| Bolton Wanderers | 2012–13 | Championship | 43 | 0 | 3 | 0 | 1 | 0 | — | | 47 | 0 |
| Bolton Wanderers | 2013–14 | Championship | 31 | 2 | 2 | 0 | 2 | 0 | — | | 35 | 2 |
| Bolton Wanderers | Total | | 168 | 4 | 13 | 0 | 10 | 0 | — | | 191 | 4 |
| Colorado Rapids | 2014 | Major League Soccer | 4 | 0 | — | | — | | — | | 4 | 0 |
| Reading | 2014–15 | Championship | 2 | 0 | — | | — | | — | | 2 | 0 |
| Career total | | | 372 | 9 | 33 | 1 | 21 | 0 | 14 | 0 | 440 | 10 |

=== International ===
Appearances and goals by national team and year
| National team | Year | Apps | Goals |
|---|---|---|---|
| England | 2005 | 2 | 0 |
| Total | | 2 | 0 |

== Honours ==
Fulham

- UEFA Intertoto Cup: 2002
