= Paddy John =

Liberian professional footballer (born 1990)

Personal information
- Date of birth: 23 February 1990 (age 36)
- Place of birth: Zwedru, Liberia
- Height: 1.75 m (5 ft 9 in)
- Position: Forward

Youth career
- FC Twente VA

Senior career*
Years	Team	Apps	(Gls)
2008–2010	Heracles Almelo	5	(0)
2010–2011	RKC Waalwijk	9	(1)
2011	Fortuna Sittard	14	(2)
2011–2012	VfL Osnabrück	10	(0)
2012–2013	AGOVV Apeldoorn	11	(0)
2016–2017	GVVV	1	(0)
- * Club domestic league appearances and goals as of 19 February 2017 (UTC)

Paddy John (born 23 February 1990) is a Liberian former professional footballer who played as a forward.

== Early and personal life ==
John was born in Zwedru, Liberia, and grew up in the Netherlands. His two brothers Collins and Ola are also footballers.

== Career ==
John began his career with the youth team of Twente, and began his professional career in the 2008–09 season with Heracles Almelo. He later played for RKC Waalwijk and Fortuna Sittard, before signing for German Club VfL Osnabrück in July 2011. After one season he returned to the Netherlands and signed with AGOVV Apeldoorn.

John signed for GVVV in August 2016. He made one appearance in the Tweede Divisie as a substitute against Jong Sparta before leaving the club in January 2017.
