= Adam Green (footballer) =

English footballer

Personal information
- Full name: Adam Green
- Date of birth: 12 January 1984 (age 42)
- Place of birth: Hillingdon, England
- Position: Defender

Team information
- Current team: Leatherhead

Youth career
- 1999–2003: Fulham

Senior career*
Years	Team	Apps	(Gls)
2003–2006	Fulham	13	(0)
2005	→ Sheffield Wednesday (loan)	3	(0)
2005	→ AFC Bournemouth (loan)	3	(0)
2006	→ Bristol City (loan)	2	(0)
2006–2007	Grays Athletic	18	(2)
2007–2008	Woking	38	(0)
2009–2011	Hayes & Yeading United	67	(3)
2011–2013	Dartford	60	(7)
2012–2013	→ Kingstonian (loan)	4	(0)
2013–2014	Basingstoke Town	37	(0)
2014–2015	Dartford	11	(0)
2014–2015	→ Leatherhead (loan)	8	(2)
2015–	Leatherhead	62	(2)
- * Club domestic league appearances and goals as of 17:00, 28 January 2015 (UTC)

Adam Green (born 12 January 1984) is an English semi-professional footballer who plays for Leatherhead as a defender.

== Career ==
Green joined the academy at Fulham in August 1999, gradually working his way through the age groups before breaking into the reserve side in the 2002–03 season. In June 2003, Green signed his first professional contract with the club. Green made his debut for Fulham in September 2003, in a 1–0 defeat by Wigan Athletic in the Football League Cup. His home debut came in January 2004, impressing in a win over Cheltenham Town in the FA Cup. In June 2004, after making his breakthrough into the first team and winning the fans Young Player of the Season award, Green signed a new two-year contract. Green started the 2004–05 season as back-up to Carlos Bocanegra, but was soon given his chance with five appearances during September and October. In January 2005, he joined Football League One side Sheffield Wednesday on a one-month loan deal. Green made three appearances for the Owls, impressing on his debut against Milton Keynes Dons. In the subsequent two games, he featured in a left wing role. In March 2005, Green was on the move again, joined League One side AFC Bournemouth on a one-month loan, making his debut against Walsall. In total, he made three appearances for the Bournemouth before returning to Fulham in April. Green's final appearance for Fulham came in September 2005, a 5–4 win over Lincoln City in the League Cup. In January 2006, he joined League One side Bristol City on loan until the end of the season. He struggled to make an impact at the club and only made two appearances during his loan spell. In May 2006, Green was released by Fulham due to the expiration of his contract.

In June 2006, Green dropped into the non-league game and signed for Conference National side Grays Athletic, as one of manager Frank Gray's first signings. He made his debut for the club on the opening day of the 2006–07 season in a 1–1 draw with Stafford Rangers. He went on to make twenty appearances for Grays scoring twice, away at Tamworth and St Albans City. In January 2007, he was released from his contract. In the same month, Green joined fellow Conference National club Woking on a free transfer, making his debut against Altrincham in a 2–0 win. He spent a year and a half at the club and made 48 appearances, before joining fellow Conference Premier side Hayes & Yeading United in the summer of 2009. He was almost an ever-present in his first season with the club making 45 appearances. In his second season with the club Green failed to nail down a regular place in the side, deciding to leave the club in May 2011 after feeling he needed a change.

In June 2011, he dropped into the semi-professional game with Conference South side Dartford, signing a one-year contract. He impressed in his first season with the club scoring seven times as the club gained promotion to the Conference Premier via the play-offs. In the summer of 2012, Green signed a new one-year contract with the club. In December 2012, he was sent out on loan to Isthmian League Premier Division side Kingstonian on a one-month deal, after failing to hold down a regular place in the first team. Green returned to Dartford in January 2013, having made four appearances. At the end of the season, he was offered a new contract by Dartford but opted to drop down a division to join Conference South side Basingstoke Town. He was a first team regular throughout his career with Basingstoke, making 46 appearances in his only season as the club finished in mid-table. In May 2014, he opted to rejoin recently relegated Conference South side Dartford on a free transfer. However, Dartford were granted a reprieve from relegation due to Salisbury City's expulsion from the league and he made his debut in the opening day defeat by Wrexham at Princes Park. He started the season as first-choice left back for Dartford, but following the arrival of Tom Bender in September, Green lost his place in the side. In October 2014, he joined Isthmian League Premier Division side Leatherhead on a one-month loan deal, making his debut - and getting sent off - in a 2–0 win over Wingate & Finchley. He stayed with the club on loan until January 2015, making ten appearances scoring once in a 3–1 win over Grays Athletic. In January 2015, his contract with Dartford was cancelled by mutual consent having made eleven appearances in his second spell for the club. Later in the month he rejoined Leatherhead on a permanent deal, signing a two-year contract.

== Career statistics ==
As of match played 24 January 2015.

Club statistics
Club	Season	League			FA Cup		League Cup		Other		Total	
Club	Season	Division	Apps	Goals	Apps	Goals	Apps	Goals	Apps	Goals	Apps	Goals
Fulham	2003–04	FA Premier League	4	0	2	0	1	0	—		7	0
Fulham	2004–05	FA Premier League	4	0	0	0	1	0	—		5	0
Fulham	2005–06	FA Premier League	0	0	0	0	1	0	—		1	0
Fulham	Total		8	0	2	0	3	0	—		13	0
Sheffield Wednesday (loan)	2004–05	League One	3	0	0	0	0	0	0	0	3	0
AFC Bournemouth (loan)	2004–05	League One	3	0	0	0	0	0	0	0	3	0
Bristol City (loan)	2005–06	League One	2	0	0	0	0	0	0	0	2	0
Grays Athletic	2006–07	Conference National	18	2	1	0	—		1 (Note: Appearance in FA Trophy)	0	20	2
Woking	2006–07	Conference National	17	0	0	0	—		2 (Note: Appearances in Surrey Senior Cup)	0	19	0
Woking	2007–08	Conference Premier	21	0	0	0	—		8 (Note: Two appearances in FA Trophy, three in Conference League Cup, three in Surrey Senior Cup)	0	29	0
Woking	Total		38	0	0	0	—		10	0	48	0
Hayes & Yeading United	2009–10	Conference Premier	43	3	1	0	—		1	0	45	3
Hayes & Yeading United	2010–11	Conference Premier	24	0	0	0	—		4 (Note: One appearance in FA Trophy, three appearances and one goal in Middlesex Senior Cup)	1	28	1
Hayes & Yeading United	Total		67	3	1	0	—		5	1	73	4
Dartford	2011–12	Conference South	42	7	3	0	—		11 (Note: Five appearances in FA Trophy, three in Kent Senior Cup, three in Conference South play-offs)	0	56	7
Dartford	2012–13	Conference Premier	18	0	0	0	—		3 (Note: Two appearances in FA Trophy, one in Kent Senior Cup)	0	21	0
Dartford	Total		60	7	3	0	—		14	0	77	7
Kingstonian (loan)	2012–13	Isthmian League Premier Division	4	0	0	0	—		0	0	4	0
Basingstoke Town	2013–14	Conference South	37	0	1	0	—		8 (Note: Three appearances and one goal in FA Trophy, five in Hampshire Senior Cup)	1	46	1
Dartford	2014–15	Conference Premier	11	0	0	0	—		0	0	11	0
Leatherhead (loan)	2014–15	Isthmian League Premier Division	8	1	0	0	—		2 (Note: One appearance in Isthmian League Cup, one in Surrey Senior Cup)	0	10	1
Leatherhead	2014–15	Isthmian League Premier Division	62	0	0	2	—		0	0	2	0
Career total			356	13	8	0	3	0	40	2	373	17

== Honours ==
Dartford

- Conference South play-offs: 2011–12
