= Papa Bouba Diop =

Senegalese footballer (1978–2020)

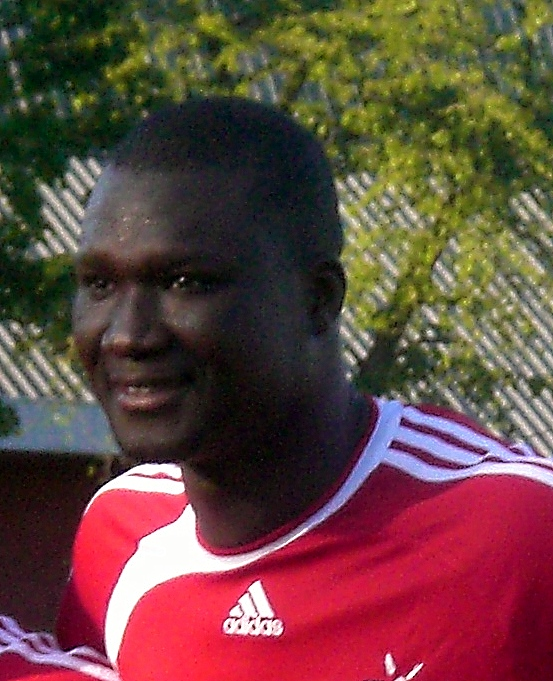
- Papa Bouba Diop in 2014

Personal information
- Full name: Papa Bouba Diop
- Date of birth: 28 January 1978
- Place of birth: Rufisque, Senegal
- Date of death: 29 November 2020 (aged 42)
- Place of death: Paris, France
- Height: 1.95 m (6 ft 5 in)
- Positions: Defensive midfielder; centre back

Youth career
- 1994–1995: Ndeffann Saltigue
- 1995–1996: ASC Diaraf

Senior career*
Years	Team	Apps	(Gls)
1996–1999	ASC Diaraf		
1999–2000	Vevey	35	(1)
2000–2001	Neuchâtel Xamax	19	(4)
2001–2002	Grasshoppers	29	(5)
2002–2004	Lens	47	(6)
2004–2007	Fulham	76	(8)
2007–2010	Portsmouth	53	(0)
2010–2011	AEK Athens	19	(1)
2011–2012	West Ham United	16	(1)
2012–2013	Birmingham City	2	(1)
Total		296	(27)

International career
2001–2008	Senegal	63	(11)
- * Club domestic league appearances and goals

Papa Bouba Diop (28 January 1978 – 29 November 2020) was a Senegalese professional footballer. His preferred position was as a defensive midfielder, but he could also play as a centre-back, where he played at Lens. Diop was considered a physically strong and aggressive player. His playing style, position, and ability drew comparisons to former France holding midfielder Patrick Vieira.

Diop spent much of his career in England, where fans nicknamed him "The Wardrobe" for his stature. He played Premier League football for Fulham and Portsmouth, and won the FA Cup with the latter club in 2008. He also played top-flight football in Switzerland for Neuchâtel Xamax and Grasshoppers, in France for Lens and in Greece for AEK Athens.

Diop's second of a total of 11 international goals for Senegal came in a 1–0 victory over then-world champions France in the opening match of the 2002 FIFA World Cup, in Senegal's first match at the FIFA World Cup. He also played at four Africa Cup of Nations tournaments, finishing as runners-up in 2002.

== Club career ==
=== Early career ===
Diop was born in Rufisque, Dakar. He began his football career with junior team Ndeffann Saltigue before joining ASC Diaraf of the Senegal Premier League in 1996. He left Senegal for Switzerland, where he spent a few months with third-tier club Vevey before signing as a professional for Ligue Nationale A club Neuchâtel Xamax in the 2000 close season. In December that same year, he joined fellow top-flight club Grasshoppers, whom he helped win the championship title in his first half-season and made his first appearance in UEFA competitions the next. He moved to France in January 2002 to join Lens of Division 1 on a five-and-a-half-year contract.

=== Fulham ===
After his impressive performances for Lens, Diop signed with Premier League team Fulham for £6 million, signing a four-year deal in July 2004. Diop made his debut against Manchester City on 14 August 2004, playing the full 90 minutes. Diop scored his first goal for Fulham against Chelsea, scoring Fulham's only goal in a 4–1 home defeat. In his first season at Fulham, Diop made such an impressive display for the club that he was named Fulham's Opta player of the season award for 2004–05.

Former Fulham manager Lawrie Sanchez said that Diop had all the attributes to become one of the best midfielders in the Premiership. He said, "There's no reason why Bouba can't get himself up to being one of the best centre midfield players in the Premiership and that's where I see his long-term position. I've seen Diop play over the years and he has all the attributes to be a top-class midfielder".

For his performances during the 2005–06 season, Diop was nominated for the Fulham "Player of the Year" award. Diop would then sign a new deal keeping him until 2009. Diop then said that he made a right decision to sign a contract with Fulham. Diop became a fans' favourite.

An injury due to hamstring, foot, and back problems resulted in him missing part of the 2006–07 season and losing the captaincy to Danny Murphy. In January 2007 Wigan Athletic made a £5 million bid for the midfielder, but Diop decided against the move and stayed with Fulham, helping them to avoid relegation.

After Diop's three years at Craven Cottage Fulham manager Lawrie Sanchez allowed him to move on, and he transferred to Portsmouth on transfer deadline day. Diop finished his Fulham career having played 84 matches for the side, scoring nine goals.

=== Portsmouth ===
Diop signed a five-year deal with Portsmouth for a fee of £3.5 million. He made his debut against Liverpool on 15 September 2007 in a 0–0 draw. Diop was a key player in Portsmouth's victorious 2008 FA Cup campaign, playing a solid, defensive game and making some crucial tackles against Cardiff City.

Following Portsmouth's relegation, Diop was considered likely to be released. Portsmouth's administrator, Andrew Andronikou, stated that Diop would only be leaving for a fee of £1 million, but Portsmouth eventually agreed to an undisclosed fee (reported as around £750,000) to transfer Diop to AEK Athens in July 2010. He played 72 games for Portsmouth without scoring.

=== AEK Athens ===
On 13 July 2010, Diop agreed terms with AEK Athens signing a two-year deal earning €900,000 per season, despite interest from Fulham, Celtic and Paris Saint-Germain.

Diop made his debut for AEK Athens against Dundee United on 19 August 2010 in a Europa League play-off first-leg game. Diop appeared as a substitute at the 81st minute of the 1–0 victory. Diop scored his first Super League goal against PAOK on 3 June 2011, the match finished 4–0 to AEK. Diop finished the season having played in only 19 league games. On 30 April 2011, Diop won the Greek Cup with AEK in a 3–0 win against Atromitos. Diop also scored two goals against PAOK in the Super League Greece play-offs giving AEK the 3–0 lead.

=== West Ham United ===
On 30 August 2011, West Ham announced the signing of Diop on a one-year deal. He joined on a free transfer after leaving AEK Athens. The deal included an option to sign for a further year. He made his debut for West Ham on 1 October 2011 in a 2–2 away draw with Crystal Palace. He scored his first and only goal for West Ham, against Barnsley on 17 December 2011. His goal proved to be the winner in a 1–0 win. He made 16 appearances for West Ham in the league and was a popular member of the squad. Although not a team member on the day, Diop celebrated on the pitch with the team as they won promotion to the Premier League via the 2012 Football League Championship play-off final at Wembley Stadium on 19 May 2012. On 30 June 2012, Diop was released by West Ham on expiry of his contract.

=== Birmingham City ===
In October 2012, he agreed terms to join former teammate Lee Clark's Birmingham City on a short-term contract, subject to successful application for a working visa, and the deal was completed on 19 October. He then signed for a further month, and finally made his Birmingham debut as a second-half substitute in a 1–1 draw away to Blackpool on 27 November. He was booked within minutes of entering the game. With Hayden Mullins suspended and Jonathan Spector injured for the visit of Crystal Palace on 15 December, Diop made his first start for Birmingham, alongside League debutant Callum Reilly in central midfield. He scored the equalising goal, a powerful header from Rob Hall's corner, as Birmingham came back from 2–0 down to draw, and was rewarded with another month's contract. He injured a hamstring soon afterwards, and despite his imminent return to fitness, the club's financial difficulties meant they could not offer him a further contract extension. He left the club in January 2013.

== International career ==
Bouba Diop received his first call-up to the Senegal national squad in 1999, at the age of 21, while playing for Neuchâtel Xamax in the Swiss Super League. He was part of their squad that finished runners-up at the 2002 Africa Cup of Nations in Mali, and scored the opening goal of a 2–1 win over Nigeria in the semi-finals.

He is perhaps best known for scoring the first goal of 2002 FIFA World Cup against France, which resulted in the 1–0 defeat of the defending world champions and, ultimately, their early elimination from the tournament, in which Senegal reached the quarter-finals. He ended as his team's top scorer of the tournament with three goals, having also scored twice against Uruguay. Diop celebrated his goal against France by running to the corner of the pitch, taking off his shirt, laying it flat on the grass, and having his teammates dance around it.

Diop played at three more Africa Cup of Nations tournaments: in 2004 he scored in a 3–0 group win over Kenya in Tunisia, and in 2006 he netted in a 3–2 victory against Guinea in the quarter-finals. His last appearances were in a group-stage elimination in Ghana in 2008, in which Senegal manager Henryk Kasperczak resigned during the tournament due to the team's ill discipline. Diop played 63 times for Senegal, scoring 11 goals.

== Style of play ==
His manager at Fulham, Chris Coleman, described him as a player with "great feet, scores goals, defends well, tackles, has got good pace", and that his "stature and ability" were unique in the Premier League at the time, similar to that of Patrick Vieira. Former Manchester United midfielder Paul Scholes described him as one of the most "awkward" players he had played against, and noted that "you get involved physically with him and you're wasting your time". During his playing career in England, Diop was nicknamed "The Wardrobe" for his stature (he was 6 feet 5 inches (1.96 m) in height).

== Death ==
Diop died in Paris on 29 November 2020 following a long illness. It was reported by L'Équipe that he had ALS.

Diop's funeral was held in Dakar on 4 December before burial in his hometown. In attendance were his widow Marie-Aude, their son and daughter, President Macky Sall and teammates from the 2002 World Cup.

During the 2022 World Cup, Senegal dedicated their win over Ecuador to Diop on the second anniversary of his death.

== Career statistics ==
=== Club ===
Appearances and goals by club, season and competition
Club	Season	League			National cup (Note: Includes FA Cup, Greek Cup)		League cup (Note: Includes Coupe de la Ligue, Football League Cup)		Europe		Other		Total	
Club	Season	Division	Apps	Goals	Apps	Goals	Apps	Goals	Apps	Goals	Apps	Goals	Apps	Goals
Vevey	1999–2000	1. Liga Classic	35	1					—				35	1
Neuchâtel Xamax	2000–01	Ligue Nationale A	19	4					—				19	4
Grasshoppers	2000–01	Ligue Nationale A	11	1					—				11	1
Grasshoppers	2001–02	Ligue Nationale A	18	4					7 (Note: Two appearances in UEFA Champions League, five appearances in UEFA Cup)	0			25	4
Grasshoppers	Total		83	10					7	0			90	10
Lens	2001–02	Ligue 1	5	0	0	0	—		—		—		5	0
Lens	2002–03	Ligue 1	16	3	0	0	0	0	4 (Note: Appearance(s) in UEFA Champions League)	0	—		20	3
Lens	2003–04	Ligue 1	26	3	0	0	2	0	6 (Note: Appearance(s) in UEFA Cup)	2	—		34	5
Lens	Total		47	6	0	0	2	0	10	2	—		59	8
Fulham	2004–05	Premier League	29	6	3	1	3	0	—		—		35	7
Fulham	2005–06	Premier League	22	2	0	0	1	0	—		—		23	2
Fulham	2006–07	Premier League	23	0	1	0	0	0	—		—		24	0
Fulham	2007–08	Premier League	2	0	0	0	—		—		—		2	0
Fulham	Total		76	8	4	1	4	0	—		—		84	9
Portsmouth	2007–08	Premier League	25	0	5	0	2	0	—		—		32	0
Portsmouth	2008–09	Premier League	16	0	0	0	0	0	4	0	1 (Note: Appearance in FA Community Shield)	0	21	0
Portsmouth	2009–10	Premier League	12	0	7	0	0	0	—		—		19	0
Portsmouth	Total		53	0	12	0	2	0	4	0	1	0	72	0
AEK Athens	2010–11	Super League Greece	19	1	6	0	—		5 (Note: Appearances in qualification play-offs)	2	7 (Note: Appearances in UEFA Europa League)	1	37	4
West Ham United	2011–12	Championship	16	1	0	0	0	0	—		—		16	1
Birmingham City	2012–13	Championship	2	1	0	0	0	0	—		—		2	1
Career total			296	27	22	1	8	0	26	4	8	1	360	33

=== International ===
Appearances and goals by national team and year
National team	Year	Apps	Goals
Senegal	2001	5	1
Senegal	2002	14	5
Senegal	2003	7	1
Senegal	2004	14	3
Senegal	2005	5	0
Senegal	2006	11	1
Senegal	2007	4	0
Senegal	2008	3	0
Total		63	11

Scores and results list Senegal's goal tally first, score column indicates score after each Diop goal.

List of international goals scored by Papa Bouba Diop
No.	Date	Venue	Opponent	Score	Result	Competition
1	8 November 2001	Jeonju World Cup Stadium, Jeonju, South Korea	South Korea	1–0	1–0	Friendly
2	2 February 2002	Stade Modibo Kéïta, Bamako, Mali	Nigeria	1–0	2–1	2002 Africa Cup of Nations
3	27 March 2002	Stade Léopold Sédar Senghor, Dakar, Senegal	Bolivia	1–0	2–1	Friendly
4	31 May 2002	Seoul World Cup Stadium, Seoul, South Korea	France	1–0	1–0	2002 FIFA World Cup
5	11 June 2002	Suwon World Cup Stadium, Suwon, South Korea	Uruguay	2–0	3–3	2002 FIFA World Cup
6	11 June 2002	Suwon World Cup Stadium, Suwon, South Korea	Uruguay	3–0	3–3	2002 FIFA World Cup
7	10 September 2003	Denka Big Swan Stadium, Niigata, Japan	Japan	1–0	1–0	2003 Kirin Challenge Cup
8	30 January 2004	Stade 15 Octobre, Bizerte, Tunisia	Kenya	2–0	3–0	2004 Africa Cup of Nations
9	20 June 2004	Stade de Kégué, Lomé, Togo	Togo	1–2	1–3	2006 FIFA World Cup qualification
10	10 October 2004	Samuel Kanyon Doe Sports Complex, Monrovia, Liberia	Liberia	1–0	3–0	2006 FIFA World Cup qualification
11	3 February 2006	Harras El Hodoud Stadium, Alexandria, Egypt	Guinea	1–1	3–2	2006 Africa Cup of Nations

== Honours ==
Grasshoppers

- Swiss Super League: 2000–01

Portsmouth

- FA Cup: 2007–08; runner-up: 2009–10

AEK Athens

- Greek Cup: 2010–11

Senegal

- Africa Cup of Nations runner-up: 2002

Sporting positions
Preceded by César Sampaio	FIFA World Cup opening goal 2002	Succeeded by Philipp Lahm
