= Neale McDermott =

English footballer

Personal information
- Full name: Neale Terence McDermott
- Date of birth: 8 March 1985 (age 41)
- Place of birth: Newcastle upon Tyne, England
- Position: Midfielder

Youth career
- 2001–2003: Newcastle United

Senior career*
Years	Team	Apps	(Gls)
2003–2006	Fulham	0	(0)
2005–2006	→ Swindon Town (loan)	13	(2)
2006	→ Darlington (loan)	3	(0)
2006–2008	Carlisle United	15	(3)
2009	La Louvière		
2009–2010	Gateshead	11	(1)
Total		42	(6)
- * Club domestic league appearances and goals

Neale Terence McDermott (born 8 March 1985) is an English former footballer who played as a midfielder.

McDermott played in the Football League for Swindon Town, Darlington and Carlisle United. He last played for Gateshead in the National League.

== Playing career ==
McDermott started his career at Newcastle United. As a youth team player, McDermott and his teammates James Beaumont and Ross Gardner lodged a complaint against academy Peter Beardsley and academy director Kenny Wharton accusing the pair of bullying. Wharton and Beardsley were cleared after an inquiry from The FA. Gardner and Beaumount left the club shortly after to join Nottingham Forest while McDermott joined Fulham on the January transfer deadline day in 2003. While at Fulham, McDermott had two loan spells at Swindon Town and Darlington.

He signed for Carlisle United on 1 August 2006 after a successful trial after being released by Fulham in May 2006.

After making only 15 appearances in two years at Carlisle, McDermott's contract was terminated by mutual consent. Neale joined Dundee on trial on Monday 23 June and travelled to Malta with the Dundee squad in an attempt to earn a deal at Dens Park. His attempt failed and he left the club.

On 3 November 2008 McDermott began training with Grimsby Town, with a view to signing a permanent deal with the club. In December he joined Wrexham on trial in an attempt to earn a professional contract with the North Wales club. In 2009, McDermott started playing for La Louvière in Belgian third division.

On 21 July 2009 McDermott played for Gateshead on trial against Durham City and signed for the club on 29 July. McDermott made his competitive debut for Gateshead on 29 August coming on as a substitute against Cambridge United. He scored his first goal for Gateshead on 26 December 2009 away at Barrow. McDermott was released by Gateshead at the end of the 2009–10 season.

== Post-playing career ==
After leaving Gateshead, McDermott began working in marketing and football recruitment. He worked in marketing for Red Bull and Adidas where he was responsible for footballer's endorsement deals. In March 2017, McDermott began working at Sunderland as the club's Head of Academy Recruitment. In September 2017, McDermott began working as part of the club's first team recruitment. Following Sunderland's relegation to League One, McDermott was one of several members of staff made redundant in May 2018. After leaving Sunderland, McDermott began working as an agent.

== Personal life ==
Attended Ponteland High School in Newcastle-upon-Tyne. He is the son of former England international Terry McDermott. His brother Greg played for Newcastle United's reserves. After leaving Newcastle, Greg played for Stockport County, Bury and Gateshead.
