= Claus Jensen =

Danish footballer (born 1977)

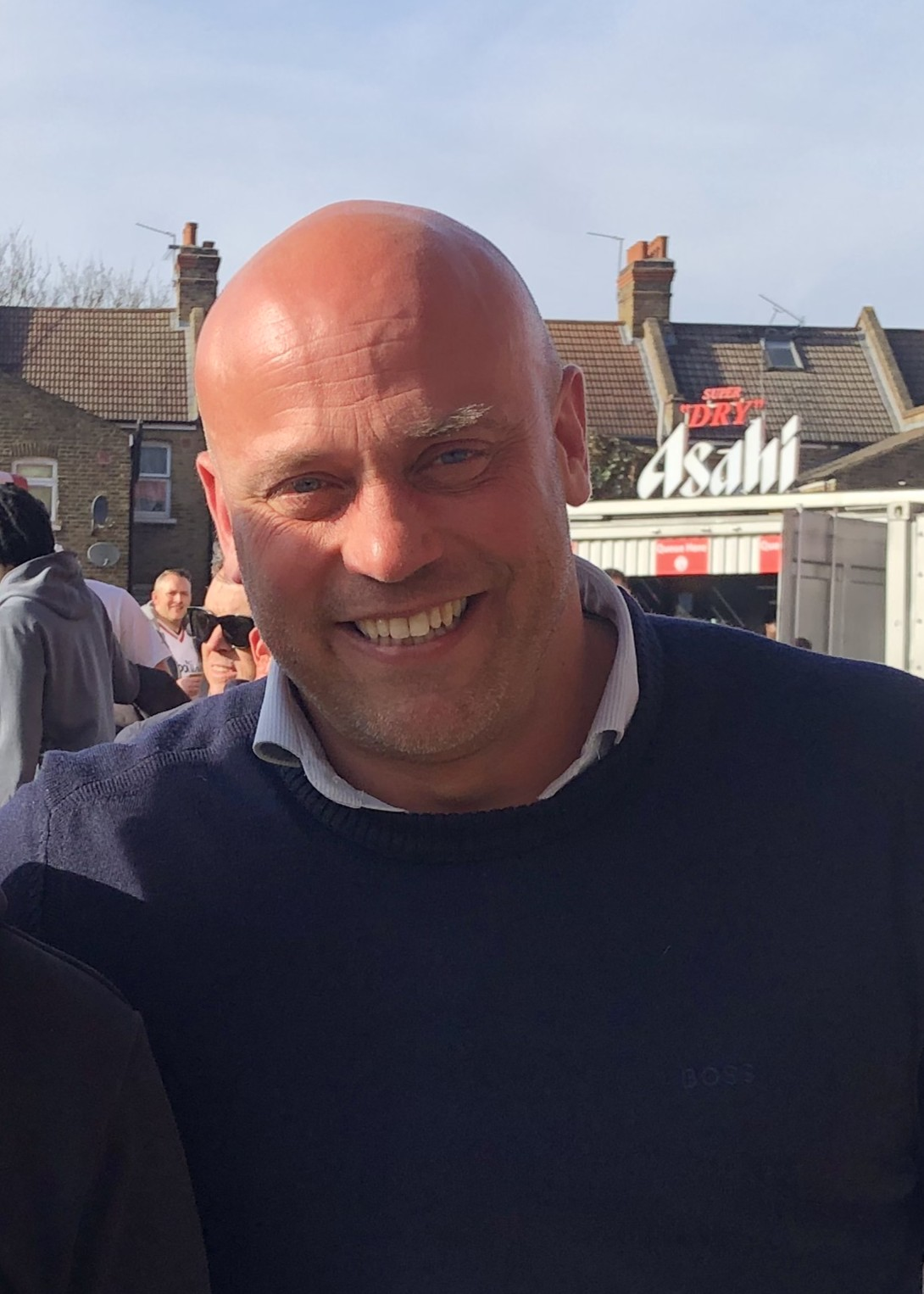
- Jensen in 2025

Personal information
- Full name: Claus William Jensen
- Date of birth: 29 April 1977 (age 49)
- Place of birth: Nykøbing Falster, Denmark
- Height: 6 ft 0 in (1.83 m)
- Position: Midfielder

Team information
- Current team: Nykøbing (Director of Football)

Senior career*
Years	Team	Apps	(Gls)
1995–1996	Næstved	4	(0)
1996–1998	Lyngby	62	(14)
1998–2000	Bolton Wanderers	86	(8)
2000–2004	Charlton Athletic	122	(16)
2004–2007	Fulham	35	(4)
Total		309	(42)

International career
1995	Denmark U19	1	(0)
1996–1999	Denmark U21	18	(3)
2000–2007	Denmark	47	(8)

Managerial career
- 2020–2024: Nykøbing
- * Club domestic league appearances and goals

Claus William Jensen (Danish pronunciation: [ˈklɑws ˈjensn̩]; born 29 April 1977) is a Danish professional football manager, and former player. During his active playing career, he played as an attacking midfielder for homeland clubs Næstved and Lyngby, as well as three other clubs in England. Jensen also made 47 appearances for the Denmark national team, in which he scored eight goals. He also represented Denmark at the 2002 World Cup and 2004 European Championship tournaments. He is the cousin of former winger Anders Due, who currently works as his assistant at Nykøbing.

== Playing career ==
Jensen was born in Nykøbing Falster, and played for a number of Danish lower-league teams, making his debut for the Danish under-19 national team in November 1995. In May 1996, he was loaned out from Danish second division club Nykøbing Falster Alliancen to Næstved in the Danish Superliga. He played four games while at Næstved, but could not prevent the club from being relegated at the end of the season. He moved permanently to Superliga club Lyngby in June 1996, signing a contract alongside later Danish international Dennis Rommedahl.

He played two years at Lyngby, before moving to play in England in July 1998. He was bought by First Division club Bolton Wanderers in a deal worth 1.8 million DKK. While at Bolton, he debuted for the Danish national team in March 2000.

In July 2000, he moved to London to join promoted Premier League club Charlton Athletic for £4 million, and became a popular player with fans due to his influence during games. The Charlton fans would sing his name to the tune "charge" (often used during baseball matches), using Jensen for the build-up and singing his full name, Claus William Jensen, at the climax. He was called up to the Danish squad for the 2002 World Cup, where he made a single appearance as a substitute. In February 2003, he scored a hat-trick in a 4–1 friendly win against Egypt; one of the goals was scored from a direct free kick. He also represented Denmark at the 2004 European Championship, where he took part in three of Denmark's four matches.

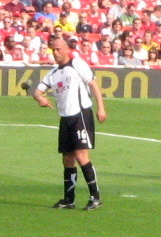
Jensen playing for Fulham in 2007

After more than 100 games for Charlton, in July 2004, he moved to the Addicks' London rivals Fulham in a deal worth £1.25 million. He made his Fulham debut at Manchester City on 14 August 2004. He spent three years with Fulham, but was plagued by injury, and on 17 May 2007, Fulham manager Lawrie Sanchez decided to release him; Jensen claims his release was inevitable because he did not fit into Sanchez's long ball tactics. After three years with repeating injuries, he chose to end his professional career on 25 August 2007.

== Post retirement career ==
In May 2015, Claus Jensen was part of a small group of investors, including TV chef Claus Meyer, comedian Mick Øgendahl and former football player Biri Biri, who bought into Nykøbing FC. At the same time, Jensen joined the board as sports director. In the summer of 2016, he stepped up and also became chairman of the club after the club was promoted to the 2016-17 Danish 1st Division.

On 7 January 2020, Jensen was appointed manager of Nykøbing; a position where he had to combine the role of sports director with the role of head coach of the club's first team. After five years as head coach of the club, the club confirmed on 4 January 2025 that Jensen would continue in the role of Director of Football at the club from the new year.

== Career statistics ==
=== Club ===
Appearances and goals by club, season and competition
Club	Season	League			National Cup		League Cup		Continental		Total	
Club	Season	Division	Apps	Goals	Apps	Goals	Apps	Goals	Apps	Goals	Apps	Goals
Næstved	1995–96	Danish Superliga	4	0								
Lyngby	1996–97	Danish Superliga	31	3								
Lyngby	1997–98	Danish Superliga	31	11								
Lyngby	Total		62	14								
Bolton Wanderers	1998–99	First Division	44	2								
Bolton Wanderers	1999–2000	First Division	42	6								
Bolton Wanderers	Total		86	8								
Charlton Athletic	2000–01	Premier League	38	5								
Charlton Athletic	2001–02	Premier League	18	1								
Charlton Athletic	2002–03	Premier League	35	6								
Charlton Athletic	2003–04	Premier League	31	4								
Charlton Athletic	Total		122	16								
Fulham	2004–05	Premier League	12	0								
Fulham	2005–06	Premier League	11	2								
Fulham	2006–07	Premier League	12	2								
Fulham	Total		35	4								
Career total			309	42								

=== International goals ===
Scores and results list Denmark's goal tally first, score column indicates score after each Jensen goal.

List of international goals scored by Claus Jensen
No.	Date	Venue	Opponent	Score	Result	Competition
1	24 March 2001	Valletta, Malta	Malta	4–0	5–0	2002 World Cup qualification
2	12 February 2003	Cairo, Egypt	Egypt	1–1	4–1	Friendly match
3	12 February 2003	Cairo, Egypt	Egypt	3–1	4–1	Friendly match
4	12 February 2003	Cairo, Egypt	Egypt	4–1	4–1	Friendly match
5	11 June 2003	Luxembourg, Luxembourg	Luxembourg	1–0	2–0	Euro 2004 qualification
6	18 August 2004	Poznań, Poland	Poland	4–1	5–1	Friendly match
7	3 September 2005	Istanbul, Turkey	Turkey	1–0	2–2	2006 World Cup qualification
8	7 September 2005	Copenhagen, Denmark	Georgia	1–0	6–1	2006 World Cup qualification
