= Collins John =

Dutch footballer (born 1985)

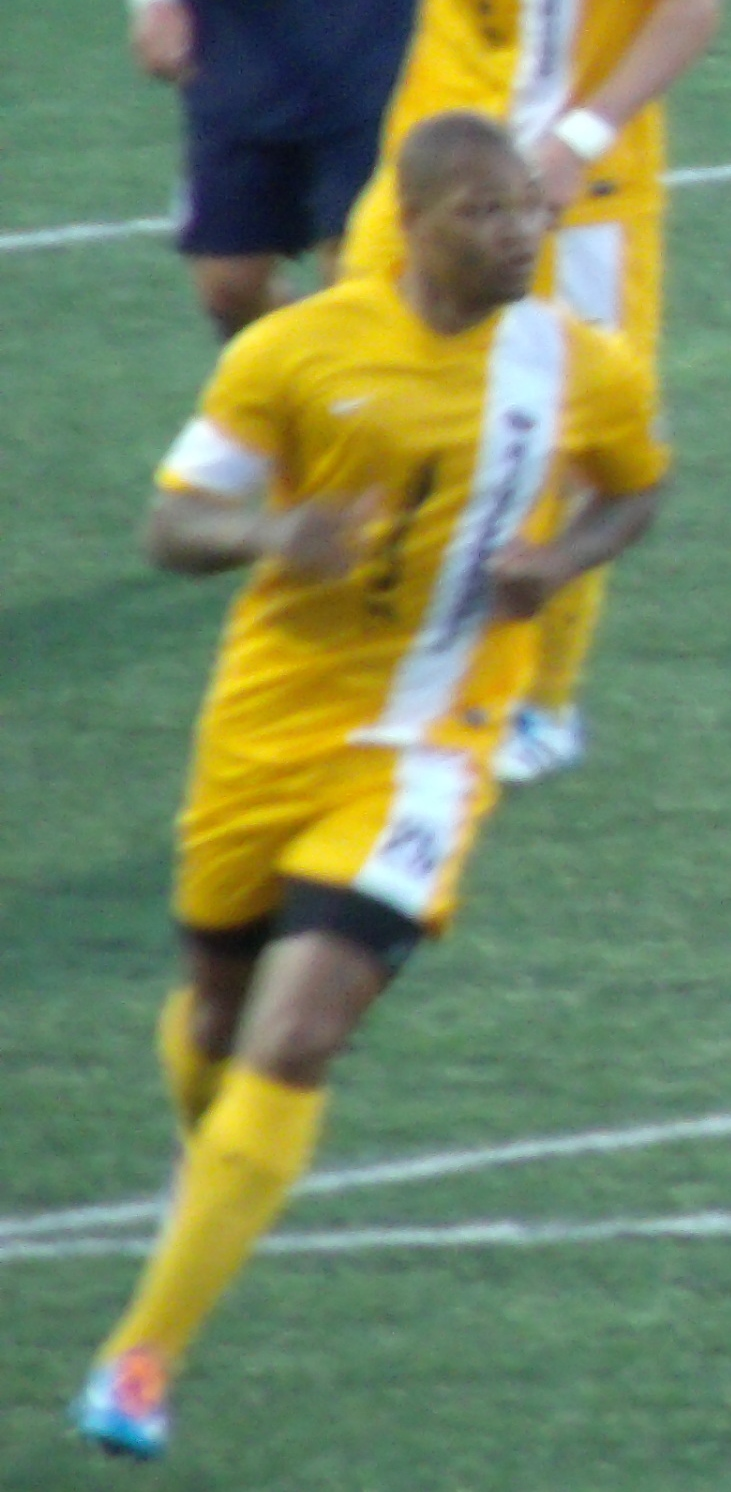
- John with Riverhounds, 2014

Personal information
- Full name: Collins John
- Date of birth: 17 October 1985 (age 41)
- Place of birth: Zwedru, Liberia
- Height: 5 ft 11 in (1.80 m)
- Position: Striker

Youth career
- –2002: DES Nijverdal
- 2002–2004: Twente

Senior career*
Years	Team	Apps	(Gls)
2002–2004	Twente	35	(11)
2004–2009	Fulham	95	(20)
2007–2008	→ Leicester City (loan)	11	(2)
2008	→ Watford (loan)	5	(0)
2008–2009	→ N.E.C. (loan)	5	(0)
2009–2010	Roeselare	11	(0)
2010	Chicago Fire	17	(3)
2011	Gabala	3	(0)
2011–2012	Mes Sarcheshmeh	4	(0)
2012–2013	Barnet	1	(0)
2013	Piast Gliwice	2	(0)
2013	Piast Gliwice II	3	(1)
2014	Pittsburgh Riverhounds	12	(4)
2019–2022	Buitenboys	5	(0)
Total		209	(41)

International career
2001	Netherlands U16	2	(1)
2004–2006	Netherlands U21	9	(4)
2004	Netherlands	2	(0)
Medal record
Men's football
Representing Netherlands
UEFA European Under-21 Championship
Winner	2006 Portugal
- * Club domestic league appearances and goals

Collins John (born 17 October 1985) is a former professional footballer who played as a striker. Born in Liberia, he represented the Netherlands national team.

John notably played in the Premier League for Fulham where he notched up 23 goals in 111 appearances, in all competitions, in a five-year stay at Craven Cottage. He also played in the English football league for Leicester City, Watford, and Barnet, in the Eredivisie for FC Twente and NEC Nijmegen, in Belgium for K.S.V. Roeselare, the United States for Chicago Fire, Azerbaijan for Gabala FC and in Iran for Mes Sarcheshmeh F.C.

== Career ==
=== Club ===
John started his professional career at Dutch first division side FC Twente as a 17-year-old, going on to score 11 league goals during one and a half seasons combined. He was signed by Fulham on 31 January 2004, cited by manager Chris Coleman as a way to expand attacking options in the future. He signed for a fee thought to be in the region of £600,000 where he was introduced at Loftus Road by John Collins, his reverse namesake. His debut for the club came as a substitute for Mark Pembridge against Chelsea in a 2–1 defeat at Stamford Bridge on 20 March. He then scored two goals in each of his next two games against Leicester City and Blackburn Rovers.

Following an auspicious start, John scored 11 league goals in 2005–06, despite only starting 15 of the 37 in which he appeared. With a further two goals in other competitions, he was Fulham's top goalscorer that season. A goal against Middlesbrough on 20 November 2005, a volley from his weaker foot, was later to be named "Goal of the Month" by the BBC, and was in the running for "Goal of the Season".

John started six of the first seven Premiership games of 2006–07, but then lost his place and started only three more times in 2006. Coming on as a second-half substitute, and having had two goals disallowed earlier in the match, he scored his twentieth league goal at Manchester City, in November 2006.

John signed for Leicester City on 23 October 2007 on a three-month loan deal. He made his debut in a 1–0 defeat to Sheffield United a few hours later, and scored his first league goal in a 2–0 win over Barnsley on 27 October.

John scored his last goal against Colchester United six days later, in a 1–1 away draw. He returned to Fulham after making a total of eleven league appearances for Leicester.

On 25 January 2008, John joined Watford on a loan deal until the end of the 2007–08 season, with the option of a permanent move after that. He struggled with his fitness during his time at the club, making only three starts and two substitute appearances. In April 2008 he returned to Fulham after tearing a thigh muscle.

On the 2008 transfer deadline day, John moved to NEC Nijmegen on a one-year loan deal, with the Dutch side also obtaining a transfer option. In Nijmegen John suffered with continual problems. Although he was important as a substitute in two UEFA Cup matches, he failed to make an impression in the Dutch league. In January 2009 he went on trial at Charlton Athletic but wasn't offered a contract. Back in Nijmegen he was suspended to the reserve squad by manager Mario Been. On 3 March John returned to Fulham after both NEC and John didn't see any reason for continuing the loan. In March, John requested to train with Dutch side Heracles Almelo, alongside his brother Paddy, till the end of the 2008–09 season. The request was denied because John had no intention to play for Heracles in the next season.

He chose to sign for Belgian Pro League side Roeselare signing a 2-year contract. On 3 December, John was suspended and demoted to the reserve squad for disciplinary reasons by manager Dennis van Wijk. On 14 December Roeselare terminated John's contract.

John joined Major League Soccer club Chicago Fire during their pre-season training camp on 29 January 2010 with a view to signing before the start of the 2010 MLS season. On 11 March 2010, Chicago Fire hired him on a free transfer. After a disappointing season in MLS, John was released by Chicago on 24 November 2010.

John joined Gabala FC in Azerbaijan on 25 January 2011. After failing to revive his career in Azerbaijan, John handed in a transfer request. John went on trial with Nottingham Forest and flew to Portugal with them for a pre-season break.

He signed a one-year contract with Iran Pro League side Mes Sarcheshmeh on 20 December 2011. In the summer of 2012, John agreed to sign for Gençlik Gücü S.K. in Northern Cyprus, but the transfer fell through. On 22 September 2012, John joined League Two side Barnet. On 12 October 2012 John was joined at the club by fellow former Dutch international Edgar Davids. John made his debut against Plymouth Argyle, but was substituted after just 15 minutes due to a thigh injury. He also played in the FA Cup against Oxford United, but he was to make only two appearances for the club, and after a string of injuries, had his contract terminated by mutual consent in January 2013.

On 25 June 2013 John joined Eredivisie side Go Ahead Eagles on trial. After failing to win a contract with Go Ahead Eagles, John held talks with Polish Ekstraklasa side Piast Gliwice, and later claimed on Twitter that he had signed a two-year deal, but in fact was only training with the club until he had proven his fitness. He eventually made his debut in the Ekstraklasa on 1 September against Śląsk Wrocław as an 82nd-minute substitute.

In March 2014 it was announced the John had signed for the Pittsburgh Riverhounds of the USL Pro, the third division of the United States soccer pyramid. John debuted for the club in their second matchday of the season against the Richmond Kickers on 5 April 2014. After coming on as a 65th-minute substitute for Jason Johnson, John scored his first goal for the club in his debut, the Riverhounds' only goal in the 1–3 defeat. In the Riverhounds' next match, John scored again during his first game at Highmark Stadium against Wilmington Hammerheads FC, for a total of two goals in two matches. Following that match, John was suspended for three matches for "violent conduct". After making thirteen appearances and scoring four goals for the Riverhounds, John and the club mutually terminated the player's contract in July 2014, citing John's desire to return his family to Europe.

John joined Crawley Town on trial in July 2014, scoring in a friendly against Brighton & Hove Albion.

From the 2016–17 season, John coached the under-19 team of SC Buitenboys. He joined their first team as a player in mid-2019, competing in the Derde Klasse.

=== International ===
John was part of the Netherlands under-21 squad that won the 2006 European Championship in Portugal.

Previously, he had already made his main team debuts, appearing in a 2–2 friendly match against Sweden, on 18 August 2004. He then made his second appearance for the Netherlands when they played in a friendly match against Liechtenstein.

== Club statistics ==
Appearances and goals by club, season and competition
Club	Season	League			National cup (Note: Includes KNVB Cup, FA Cup, Belgian Cup, Open Cup, Azerbaijan Cup, Hazfi Cup)		League cup (Note: Includes League Cup)		Continental		Total	
Club	Season	Division	Apps	Goals	Apps	Goals	Apps	Goals	Apps	Goals	Apps	Goals
FC Twente	2002–03	Eredivisie	17	2							17	2
FC Twente	2003–04	Eredivisie	18	9	1	1					19	10
FC Twente	Total		35	11	1	1	—		—		36	12
Fulham	2003–04	Premier League	8	4	—		—		—		8	4
Fulham	2004–05	Premier League	27	4	5	2	2	0	—		34	6
Fulham	2005–06	Premier League	35	11	1	1	2	0	—		38	12
Fulham	2006–07	Premier League	23	1	1	0	1	0	—		25	1
Fulham	2007–08	Premier League	2	0	0	0	1	0	—		3	0
Fulham	Total		95	20	7	3	6	0	—		108	23
Leicester City	2007–08	Championship	11	2	—		—		—		11	2
Watford	2007–08	Championship	5	0	—		—		—		5	0
NEC Nijmegen	2008–09	Eredivisie	5	0	0	0	—		2	1	7	1
K.S.V. Roeselare	2009–10	Belgian Pro League	11	0	0	0	—		—		11	0
Chicago Fire	2010	Major League Soccer	17	3	—		—		—		17	3
Gabala	2010–11	Azerbaijan Premier League	3	0	—		—		—		3	0
Mes Sarcheshmeh	2011–12	Iran Pro League	4	0	0	0	0	0	—		4	0
Barnet	2012–13	Football League Two	1	0	1	0	0	0	—		2	0
Piast Gliwice	2013–14	Ekstraklasa	2	0	0	0	—		—		2	0
Piast Gliwice II	2013–14	III liga	3	1	—		—		—		3	1
Pittsburgh Riverhounds	2014	USL Pro	12	4	2	1	—		—		14	5
Career total			204	41	12	5	6	0	2	1	224	47

== Personal life ==
John was born in Zwedru, Liberia, but his family emigrated to the Netherlands after the murder of his father, during the Liberian Civil War.

His two brothers Paddy and Ola are also footballers.

== Honours ==
Netherlands U21

- UEFA European Under-21 Championship: 2006
