= Louis Saha =

French association football player (born 1978)

- Saha in 2024

Personal information
- Full name: Louis Laurent Saha
- Date of birth: 8 August 1978 (age 48)
- Place of birth: Paris, France
- Height: 1.85 m (6 ft 1 in)
- Position: Striker

Youth career
- 1990–1995: Soisy-Andilly-Margency
- 1992–1995: Clairefontaine
- 1995–1997: Metz

Senior career*
Years	Team	Apps	(Gls)
1997–2000	Metz	47	(5)
1999	→ Newcastle United (loan)	11	(1)
2000–2004	Fulham	117	(53)
2004–2008	Manchester United	86	(28)
2008–2012	Everton	97	(27)
2012	Tottenham Hotspur	10	(3)
2012–2013	Sunderland	11	(0)
2013	Lazio	6	(0)
Total		385	(117)

International career
1998–1999	France U21	12	(3)
2004–2012	France	20	(4)
Medal record
Representing France
Men's football
FIFA World Cup
Runner-up	2006
UEFA European Under-19 Championship
Winner	1997
- * Club domestic league appearances and goals

Louis Laurent Saha (born 8 August 1978) is a French former professional footballer who played as a striker. Saha was capped 20 times for the France national team and scored four goals. Louis Saha was initially a student of the Clairefontaine football academy, before beginning his professional career at Metz, then moving on loan to Newcastle United. Before the start of the 2000–01 season, Saha moved to Fulham where he established himself as first-choice striker, helping them to gain promotion to the Premier League in his first season with them.

His performances gained attraction from Manchester United, who eventually secured his signing for around £12.4 million midway through the 2003–04 season. Injuries plagued his Old Trafford career; however, he enjoyed major success, including winning the Premier League title twice, the UEFA Champions League in 2008, and the League Cup in 2006, where he was the top scorer in the competition and netted in the final. Despite Saha's injury woes, United star Wayne Rooney stated on Sky Sports that Saha was one of his favourite strike partners.

After four and a half years at United, Everton took him to Goodison Park, where he opened the scoring in the 2009 FA Cup Final after 25 seconds, setting the record for the fastest goal scored in FA Cup Final history.

Saha made his France debut in 2004, in a 2–0 victory over Belgium. He represented France at UEFA Euro 2004 and the 2006 FIFA World Cup.

== Early life ==
Saha was born in Paris. His parents were born on the island of Guadeloupe (a department of France), where his grandparents remain to this day. He has a younger sister and younger brother. Saha also revealed he and his siblings were brought up in a strict Caribbean culture.

His father worked as an aircraft mechanic and his mother worked as a nurse. Growing up in Paris, Saha said his family had little money, leading him to "never take anything for granted", In return, he bought his parents a house in the West Indies, and covered his parents' debt. Saha revealed that his father tried to make him balance his football with the rest of his education, but nevertheless pushed him to make sure he "got enough education away from football" and supported him "all the way in helping him mature as a footballer and as a man".

== Club career ==
=== Metz ===
Saha began his football career at Soisy-Andilly-Margency in the commune of Soisy-sous-Montmorency before he joined Clairefontaine. He later moved to Metz at the age of 15 and then signed his first professional contract with the club at 17. Saha progressed to the senior team in 1997. Saha made his Metz debut on 8 August 1997, coming on as a late substitute against Bordeaux and scored the club's fourth goal of the game, in a 4–1 win. This was his only goal of the season, as Metz finished second place in the league behind Lens by goal difference. Overall, he made 25 appearances in all competitions. The 1998–99 season saw Saha lose first team opportunities, as he only made six appearances in all competitions.

Saha went on loan to Newcastle United in January 1999, scoring once against Coventry City and playing in a total of 11 league games. He also scored in Newcastle's run to the 1999 FA Cup Final with the only goal in the fifth round clash against Blackburn Rovers; however, he was left out of the cup final squad entirely by manager Ruud Gullit. He later reflected his time at Newcastle United, saying it made him acknowledge how hard he has to work as a footballer and gaining confidence.

At the conclusion of the 1998–99 season, Saha returned to Metz, where he made an impact, scoring seven goals for the 1999 UEFA Intertoto Cup, against MŠK Žilina, Lokeren, Polonia Warsaw and West Ham United. Saha's first goal for the club came on 7 August 1999, winning 3–0 against Auxerre. Saha scored three more goals later in the 1999–2000, as he made 33 appearances and scoring 11 times in all competitions. Despite being in a goal scoring form, Saha revealed that the club wanted him to "take on a lot more defensive duties", something that made him consider quitting football. By the time Saha left the club at the close of the 1999–2000 season, he netted five goals in 47 matches for a two-year spell.

=== Fulham ===
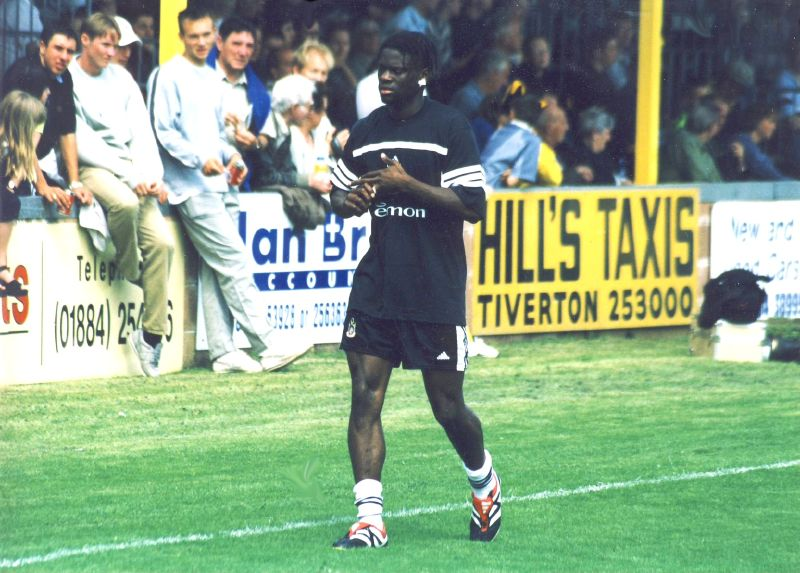
Saha, just after signing for Fulham, in a pre-season friendly against Tiverton Town in 2000

Saha returned to England, where he was signed by Fulham for £2.1 million in 2000. Upon joining the club, Manager Jean Tigana said: "Louis is a very good signing. I have known him since he was 17 and he has great ability. I am sure he will follow the success of his contemporaries Thierry Henry and Nicolas Anelka. I believe he will be a very good player in the First Division and has the right qualities to be a success in the Premiership".

Saha quickly made an impact on his Fulham debut, scoring his first goal of the season in a 2–0 win against Crewe Alexandra in the opening game of the season. This was followed up by scoring in a 3–1 win against Birmingham City. Since making his debut, Saha quickly established himself in the first team, becoming the club's first-choice striker and, along with John Collins and Lee Clark, their performances were described as "world class" by the Evening Standard. He then scored eight goals in four matches in September 2000, scoring once against Nottingham Forest, braces against Northampton Town and Burnley, and a hat-trick against Barnsley. His goalscoring form continued with three goals in two matches against Grimsby Town on 25 November and Derby County on 29 November 2000. Saha scored two goals in two matches between in January 2001 against Norwich City and Watford. He then scored twice for the side in a 4–1 win against Tranmere Rovers on 30 March 2001. Saha scored three goals in two matches between in April 2001 against Portsmouth and Wolverhampton Wanderers. In the promotion-winning campaign of 2000–01 Saha scored 27 league goals to fire Fulham into the Premier League, making him the league top–scorer. At the conclusion of the 2000–01 season, he made 48 appearances and scored 32 times in all competitions. For his achievement, Saha was named PFA Team of the Year.

In the first two matches of the 2001–02 season, Saha scored three goals, against Manchester United and Sunderland. During his first month in the top flight he was named Premier League Player of the Month. Saha continued to regain his first team place as the club's first choice striker, forming a partnership with Barry Hayles throughout the 2001–02 season. Although Saha did score in the League Cup against Derby County on 10 October 2001, he went on a three-month spell without scoring in the league before scoring against Newcastle United, in a 3–1 victory on 17 November 2001. However, Saha's goal scoring form continued to dip, scoring only four more goals later in the 2001–02 season, including a brace against Chelsea. At the conclusion of the season, Saha had made 44 appearances and scored nine times in all competitions.

At the start of the 2002–03 season, Saha appeared in every match of the UEFA Intertoto Cup, scoring once against Egaleo in the third round on 20 July 2002. He played in both legs of the Intertoto Cup finals against Bologna, as they won 5–3 to win the tournament and qualify for the UEFA Cup. Saha scored his first league goal of the season, from a penalty, in a 4–1 win against Bolton Wanderers in the opening game of the season. However, he suffered a hamstring injury that kept him out for the rest of 2002. Saha scored on his return on 5 January 2003, in a 3–1 win against Birmingham City in the third round of the FA Cup. However, his return was short-lived as he suffered another injury that saw him miss two matches. He returned to the first team on 1 February 2003, coming on as a 69th-minute substitute, in a 2–1 loss against Arsenal. He then scored his fourth goal of the season in a 3–0 win against West Bromwich Albion. Following his return, Saha managed to regain his first team place for the rest of the 2002–03 season, playing in the striker position. He scored three more goals later in the 2002–03 season, including scoring two goals in two matches in March 2003 against Sunderland and Southampton. As a result of his injuries he was less prolific in the 2002–03 season, scoring onlyseven goals in 28 appearances in all competitions.

Ahead of the 2003–04 season, it was announced by the club that Saha would be staying put. He started the season well, scoring in the opening game of the season, winning 3–2 win against Middlesbrough. Saha then scored three goals in three matches in September 2003, scoring against Birmingham City, Manchester City and Blackburn Rovers. Throughout the first half of the season, he continued to be in the first team regular for Fulham, playing in the striker position. His goal scoring form continued to the end of the year, scoring three braces. As a result, Saha was named as the Player of the Month for December. In his final season at Fulham, he contributed 15 goals in only 22 appearances before leaving in the January transfer window.

It was announced on 23 December 2003 by the club that they rejected a bid from Manchester United to sign Saha, saying he was not for sale. It came after when his performance at Fulham's victory over Manchester United at Old Trafford in October 2003 was thought to be influential in persuading Alex Ferguson to sign him in 2004. Around this time, Saha revealed that he had a falling out with manager Chris Coleman as a result of the way in which he left Fulham. During a spell of nearly four years at the club, Saha scored 63 goals.

=== Manchester United ===
Saha was transferred to Manchester United for a fee of £12.4 million in 2004, having scored 15 goals so far that season and impressing Alex Ferguson in Fulham's 3–1 win at Old Trafford. Fulham were reluctant to sell Saha but he pushed for a deal and it eventually went through on 23 January 2004. A month later, however, Metz brought a case to FIFA (and later Court of Arbitration for Sport) arguing that they were entitled to a share of Saha's transfer fee from Fulham. Two years later, the Court of Arbitration for Sport ruled in favour of Metz and Fulham were ordered to pay.

Saha impressed early, with seven goals in his ten starting appearances of the 2003–04 season and scoring on his debut against Southampton. After the match, Manager Ferguson praised his performance. In the next match, versus Everton, Saha and Ruud van Nistelrooy both scored two goals in a 4–3 win. On 28 February 2004, he faced his former team for the first time, scoring the only goal for United in a 1–1 draw. Throughout the match, Saha received boos and jeers from Fulham supporters. He then played in both legs of the UEFA Champions League Round of 16 against Porto, as Manchester United lost 3–2 on aggregate. After missing two matches due to an Achilles problem, Saha returned to the first team and scored in the next two matches against Arsenal and Birmingham City. He was unable to play in the 2004 FA Cup Final win over Millwall, being cup-tied due to an earlier appearance with Fulham. Despite this, Saha went on to make 12 appearances and scoring seven times in all competitions by the conclusion of the 2003–04 season.

The 2004–05 season was a stop-start season marred by constant injury for Saha. He made his first appearance of the season on 28 August 2004, coming on as a second half substitute, in a 1–1 draw against Blackburn Rovers. However, Saha picked up a knee injury playing for France against the Faroe Islands which put him out of action for a month. He returned to the first team on 16 October 2004, playing the full 90 minutes of a 0–0 draw against Birmingham City. Saha then scored his first goal of the season, in a 2–0 win against Crystal Palace in the fourth round of the League Cup on 10 November 2004. Shortly after, he picked up an injury again while playing for the national side and costing him nearly two months out. Saha did not next play a full 90 minutes until 12 January 2005, in a 0–0 draw against Chelsea in the first leg of the League Cup semi–finals. Ten days later on 22 January 2005 he scored his second goal of the season, as well as setting up the first goal of the game in a 3–1 win against Aston Villa. However in February, the problem recurred, leaving Saha out for a further two months. At the conclusion of the 2004–05 season, Saha never got going, making only 11 starting appearances, 11 from the bench and scoring two goals.

Over the summer, Saha suffered another hamstring strain which ruled him out for the first three months of the 2005–06 season. He scored on his first appearance of the season, as well as setting up the third goal of the game, in a 3–1 win against West Bromwich Albion on 30 November 2005. Following his return, Saha eased back into side as a substitute, making appearances in League Cup matches. To the surprise of many, the French striker recaptured his initial good form and started a streak of goalscoring form. Six goals in the League Cup run saw him usurp Van Nistelrooy as the first-choice strike partner for Wayne Rooney. Saha was named a starter over Van Nistelrooy in the final against Wigan Athletic, and scored a goal. Despite suffering from an injury along the way, he scored four more goals later in the 2005–06 season, including a brace against West Bromwich Albion on 18 March 2006. At the end of the 2005–06 season, Saha had made 30 appearances and scored 15 times in all competitions.

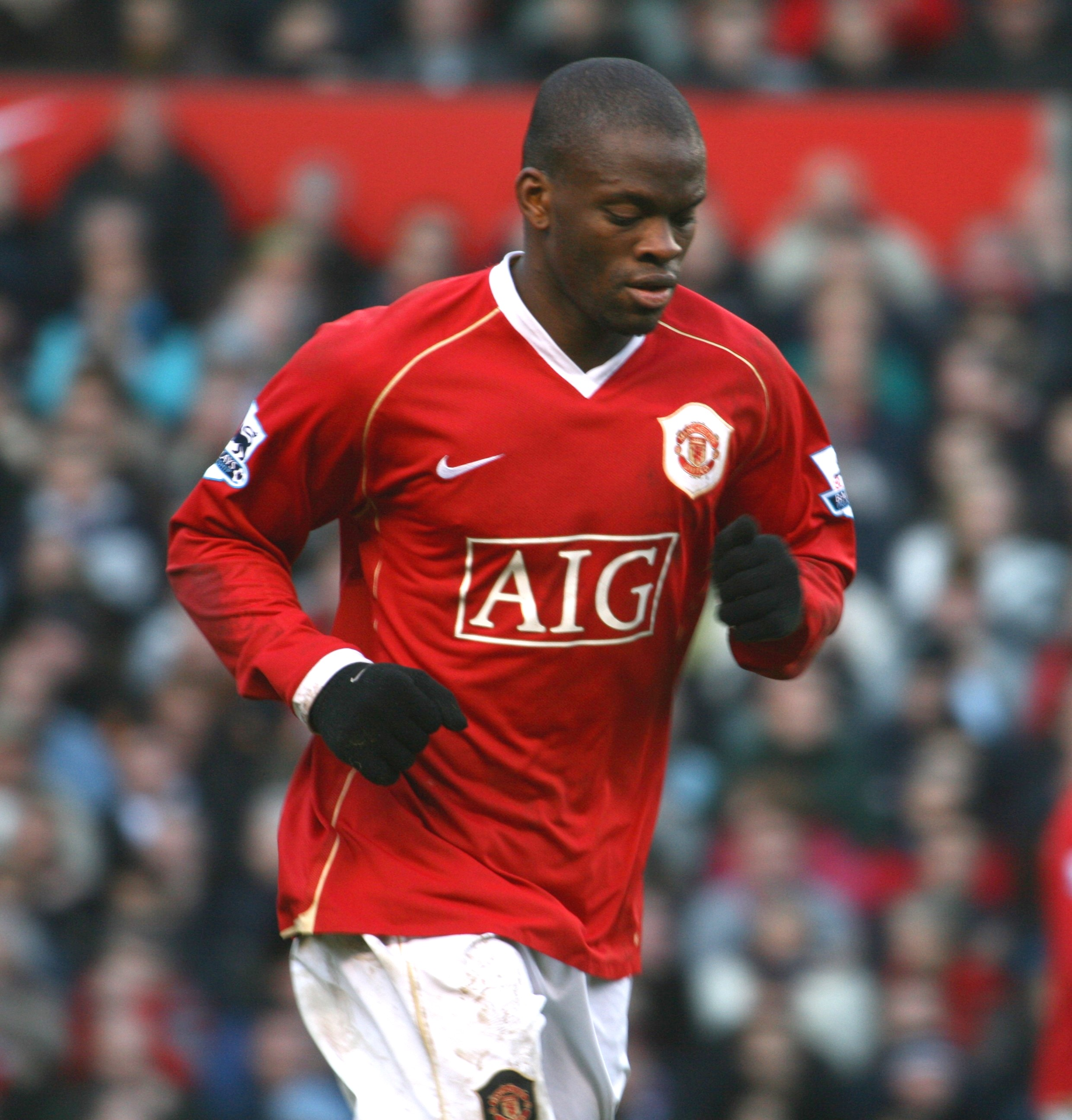
Saha, scorer of United's second goal, pictured during the 3–1 Manchester derby win on 9 December 2006.

Saha was chosen by Ferguson to partner alongside Rooney for the next season, after Van Nistelrooy's exit for Real Madrid during the summer transfer window. He began the 2006–07 season by scoring only seven minutes into the first game against Fulham. This was followed up by scoring his second goal of the season in a 3–0 win against Charlton Athletic, as well as setting up the second goal of the game. Saha then scored twice for the side, as well as setting up the third goal of the game, in a 3–2 win against Celtic in the UEFA Champions League. He scored the winning goal away to Benfica in the UEFA Champions League and later scored in the home leg. Saha's goal scoring form continued for the rest of 2006. As a result, he signed an extension to his contract lasting to 2010, though soon after began suffering from more injury problems. Groin and hamstring injuries restricted appearances and meant he only scored one goal in the second half of the season. He returned as substitute at Roma but then picked up a knee injury and was therefore absent for United's 1–0 extra-time loss to Chelsea in the FA Cup final. Saha ended the season with 13 goals in all competitions, largely thanks to his pre-Christmas form.

In the 2007–08 season, Saha returned from injury and came on as a substitute against Sunderland, scoring the winning goal. On 23 September 2007, Saha won and converted a penalty against Chelsea in Chelsea's first game with Avram Grant in charge. United won the game 2–0. This earned Saha a recall to the France national team after a year out. Against Arsenal, Saha came on to replace the underperforming Carlos Tevez in a 2–2 draw. He was key in setting up a goal as Cristiano Ronaldo gave United a 2–1 lead. Saha continued to make appearances off the bench, but when Wayne Rooney was ruled out for a few weeks he partnered Tevez up front. He then started in a match against Sunderland on Boxing Day, and scored twice including a penalty, winning 2–0 to lift Manchester United to 1st position in the Premier League. After being sidelined with a knee injury that kept him out for a month, Saha made his return in an FA Cup clash versus Arsenal on 16 February 2008, winning 4–0. The following weekend, he came on as a substitute for Ronaldo, scoring the final goal in a 5–1 rout of Newcastle United. After returning to nearly full fitness, Saha's injury haunts returned and forced him off with a hamstring complaint during United's win over Bolton Wanderers at Old Trafford. Saha was ruled out for several weeks, missing key games. In the final game of the Premier League season against Wigan Athletic, Saha was named as a substitute, but played no part in the game. In May 2008, Saha admitted that he believed his United career was in doubt. Despite his desire to stay and love for the club, he was unsure of what the future held for him at Old Trafford.

Despite struggling with injuries in many of his seasons with Manchester United, Saha still contributed 42 goals in all competitions in 120 appearances for the club.

=== Everton ===
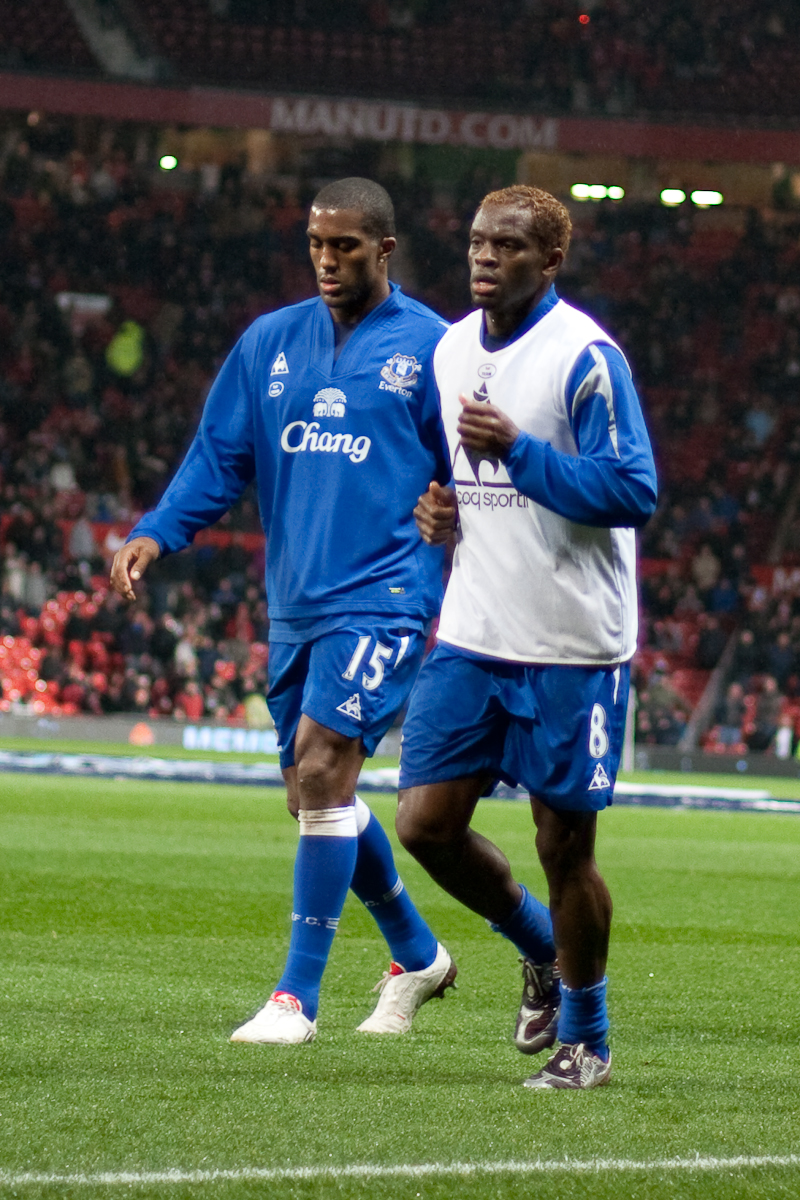
Saha (right) alongside Sylvain Distin with Everton in 2009

Saha joined Everton in 2008 for an undisclosed fee, signing a two-year 'pay-as-you-play' deal. Not match-fit at his time of signing, Saha offered to train without being paid while injured.

Saha made his Everton debut on 22 September coming on as a substitute in a league game away to Hull City, before scoring his first goal against his former club Fulham, at Goodison Park on 1 November. This was followed up by scoring a brace, as well as setting up the first goal of the game in a 3–1 win against West Ham United. However during a 1–0 win against Tottenham Hotspur on 30 November 2008, he suffered a knee injury and was substituted in the 60th minute. Following this, it was announced that Saha would be out for two months. He returned to the first team on 22 February 2009, coming on as a 74th-minute substitute, in a 0–0 draw against Newcastle United. This was followed up by scoring his fourth league goal of the season in a 2–0 win against West Bromwich Albion. A week later on 8 March 2009, he came off the bench at half-time in that season's FA Cup quarter-final against Middlesbrough, scoring the winner and helping Everton reach the semi-finals for the first time since 1995. Two months later, against West Ham United, Saha scored twice for the second time in the season, as the club won 3–1. Two weeks later in the FA Cup final, Saha scored the fastest goal in the final's history after 25 seconds, though opponents Chelsea came from behind to win 2–1. This broke Bob Chatt's record, set 114 years earlier in the 1895 Final. It was also the fastest goal in any match at the new Wembley Stadium, beating the previous record by Giampaolo Pazzini in March 2007 in an under-21 international for Italy. Throughout the 2008–09 season, he established himself in the starting 11, forming a striking partnership with Yakubu. At the end of the 2008–09 season, Saha had made 29 appearances and scored eight times in all competitions.

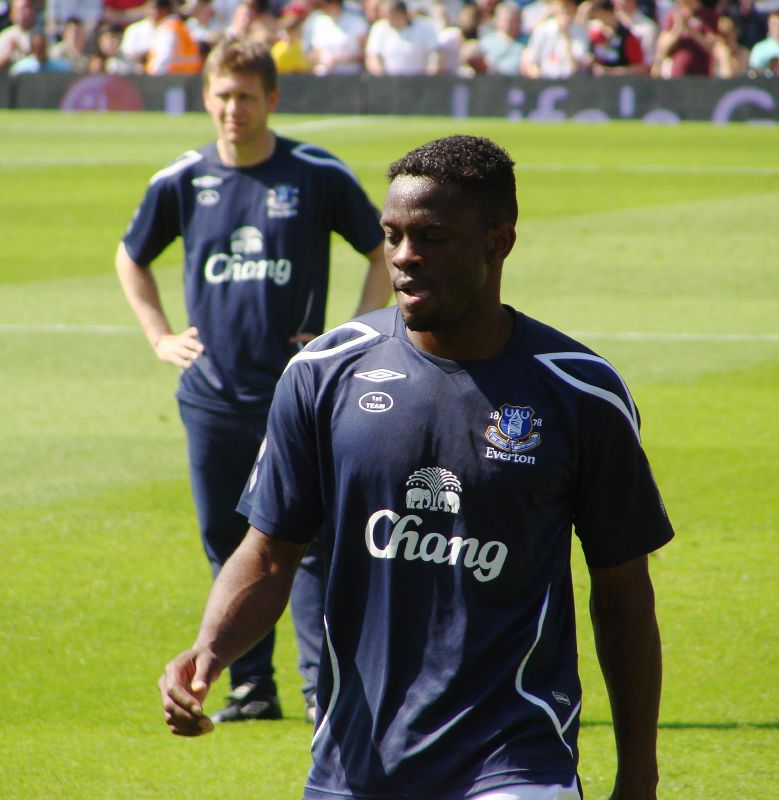
Saha warming up prior to Everton's match against Fulham in 2009

Saha scored his first goal of the 2009–10 season after coming on as a substitute on the opening day of the season against Arsenal, in a 6–1 defeat at Goodison Park. His goalscoring form continued for the next two months, scoring a goal against both Wigan Athletic and Portsmouth, as well as braces against Sigma Olomouc and Blackburn Rovers. He went on to a run of seven goals in seven games in all competitions by the end of the year. The next two months saw Saha earned two Player of the Month awards by the club. Saha signed a two-year contract extension with Everton on 5 February 2010, keeping him at the club until the end of the 2011–12 season. Five days later he scored a brace for the side, in a 2–1 win against Chelsea. Throughout the 2009–10 season he established himself in the starting 11, playing in the striker position, but found his goalscoring form dipped as the season progressed. Despite suffering from injuries during the season along the way, Saha made 40 appearances and scored 15 times in all competitions.

At the start of the 2010–11 season, Saha continued to retain his first team place for the first four matches, scoring his first goal in a 5–1 win against Huddersfield Town in the second round of the League Cup. However, he suffered an injury while on international duty that kept him out for a month. He returned from injury on 23 October 2010, coming on as a 61st-minute substitute in a 1–1 draw against Tottenham Hotspur. Since returning from injury, he was involved in the first team for the next three months, though he struggled to regain his goalscoring form. Saha then suffered a thigh injury that saw him miss one match. Saha scored his eighth goal in five starts against Chelsea on 29 January 2011, and continued his form in the next home game, against Blackpool on 5 February, when he netted four goals in a 5–3 victory. It was his first hat-trick in the Premier League. Saha scored again for Everton against Fulham on 19 March 2011 with a low right footed drive from a free kick, he was later stretchered off with an ankle injury and remained sidelined for the remainder of the season. At the end of the 2010–11 season, Saha had made 26 appearances and scored nine times in all competitions.

Saha made his return for the 2011–12 season on 30 July 2011 in a pre-season fixture against the recently relegated Birmingham City at St Andrews. He was substituted into the match in the second half and scored 3 minutes into his return from injury with a low right footed drive from outside the box. After missing four matches, Saha returned to the first team, coming on as a 66th-minute substitute in a 2–0 loss against Manchester City on 24 September 2011. This was followed up by making his first start of the season for Everton in a home fixture against Liverpool. Everton lost the game 2–0. He then scored his first goal of the season in a 3–1 victory over Fulham at Craven Cottage after coming on as a substitute. Saha continued his scoring in the following game on 26 October against Chelsea in a League Cup tie. He failed to score again for Everton, a drought that lasted 942 consecutive minutes of league football. Saha left Everton having scored 35 goals in 115 appearances.

=== Tottenham Hotspur ===
On 31 January 2012, Saha completed a free transfer move to Tottenham Hotspur, signing a six-month contract. He was given the number 15 jersey, last worn by Peter Crouch.

Less than a week later, he made his debut against Liverpool, coming on as a substitute for Emmanuel Adebayor in a 0–0 draw. He made his full debut in the very next league fixture against Newcastle United, scoring twice in a 5–0 win. On 26 February 2012, he made it three goals in three games for his new club when he scored the opening goal in Tottenham's North London derby defeat against Arsenal, 5-2.

He scored his fourth goal, in all competitions, for the club against Bolton Wanderers to make it 3–1 to Tottenham with the last kick of the game to send his side through to the FA Cup semi-finals against London rivals Chelsea. Following his successful short spell with Tottenham, Saha reported that he was desperate to seal a long term deal at White Hart Lane, citing Harry Redknapp as a big factor in his upturn in form. On 13 July 2012, it was confirmed that Saha was released after his contract expired at the end of the season.

=== Sunderland ===
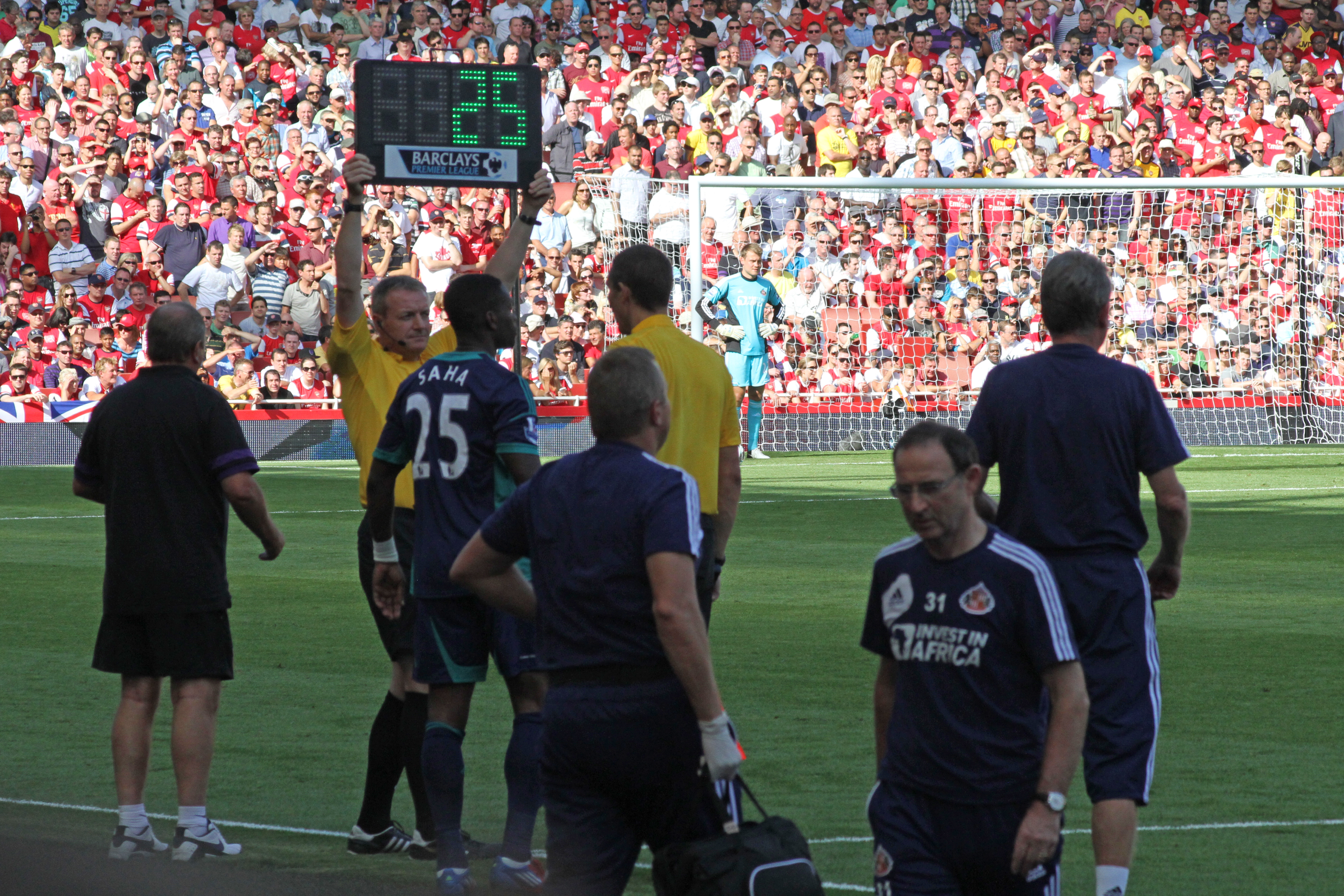
Saha coming on for his Sunderland debut as a substitute

On 16 August 2012, Sunderland confirmed the signing of Saha on a one-year deal. He made his debut two days later, coming on as a substitute in a 0–0 draw with Arsenal. His contract was mutually terminated on transfer deadline day January 2013. During Saha's time at Sunderland, he made only 14 appearances and failed to score a single goal.

=== Lazio ===
On 6 February 2013, Saha signed a six-month contract with Italian club Lazio. The following day, he was presented by the club.

Saha made his debut for Lazio, coming on as a substitute on 9 February 2013 in a match against Napoli. However, he found his playing time limited, mostly coming on as a substitute, as he went on to make six appearances for the club. Despite being keen to stay at the club beyond the 2012–13 season, Saha was released at the end of the short-term deal.

== International career ==
Saha represented France at various youth levels and scored the winning goal in the 1997 UEFA European Under-18 Championship against Portugal.

Saha said he wanted to play for France and put his name in the short–list to be called up to the national squad for the 2002 FIFA World Cup but due to his lack of form during the 2001–02 season, Saha acknowledged that he would be unlikely to be in the squad for the tournament, which turned out to be true. It was not until 2004 that Saha finally earned his first full cap, marking his debut with a goal in a 2–0 victory over Belgium on 18 February. That summer he was also selected for the UEFA Euro 2004 squad. Saha then scored his second goal for France, scoring the third goal of the game in a 4–0 win against Andorra on 28 May 2004. Having appeared in the first two matches as an unused substitute in the group stage, he made his first appearance of the tournament against Switzerland, coming on as a 75th-minute substitute, and set up a goal for Thierry Henry to score the national team's second goal of the game, winning 3–1. However, Saha played 18 minutes, having come on as a 72nd-minute substitute, as France lost 1–0 against Greece in the quarter–finals, eliminating the national side from the competition.

Two years later, Saha was called up to the national team squad for the FIFA World Cup, earning his first call-up in almost a year. He made his first appearance for the national side in almost a year, starting a match against Denmark on 31 May 2006 and set up France's first goal of the game, in a 2–0 win. Saha made his first appearance of the World Cup, coming on as a 69th-minute substitute, in a 0–0 draw against Switzerland. Saha contributed to France reaching the 2006 FIFA World Cup Final, but he was suspended for the final against Italy after receiving a yellow card during the semi-final victory over Portugal.

After the end of the World Cup tournament, Saha was called up to the France squad for the match against Bosnia and Herzegovina, and started in a 2–1 win. Saha then followed up in his next appearance for the national side by scoring in a 3–0 win against Georgia. A month later on 11 October 2006, he scored his fourth goal for France, in a 5–0 win against Faroe Islands.

Saha was named in the squad picked for the Euro 2012 qualifiers, which also included goalkeeper Hugo Lloris, Chelsea's Florent Malouda and nine other players who took part in France's disappointing 2010 World Cup campaign. Prior to this, he had not played for his national side since November 2006 (although he was called up by Raymond Domenech in February 2010, he withdrew from the squad due to injury). Saha made an appearance for France for the first time in four years, coming on as a 79th-minute substitute, in a 1–0 loss against Belarus on 3 September 2010. Two years later, on 29 February 2012, he made his return to the national team in a 2–1 win against Germany, in what turned out to be his last appearance for France.

== Post-playing career ==
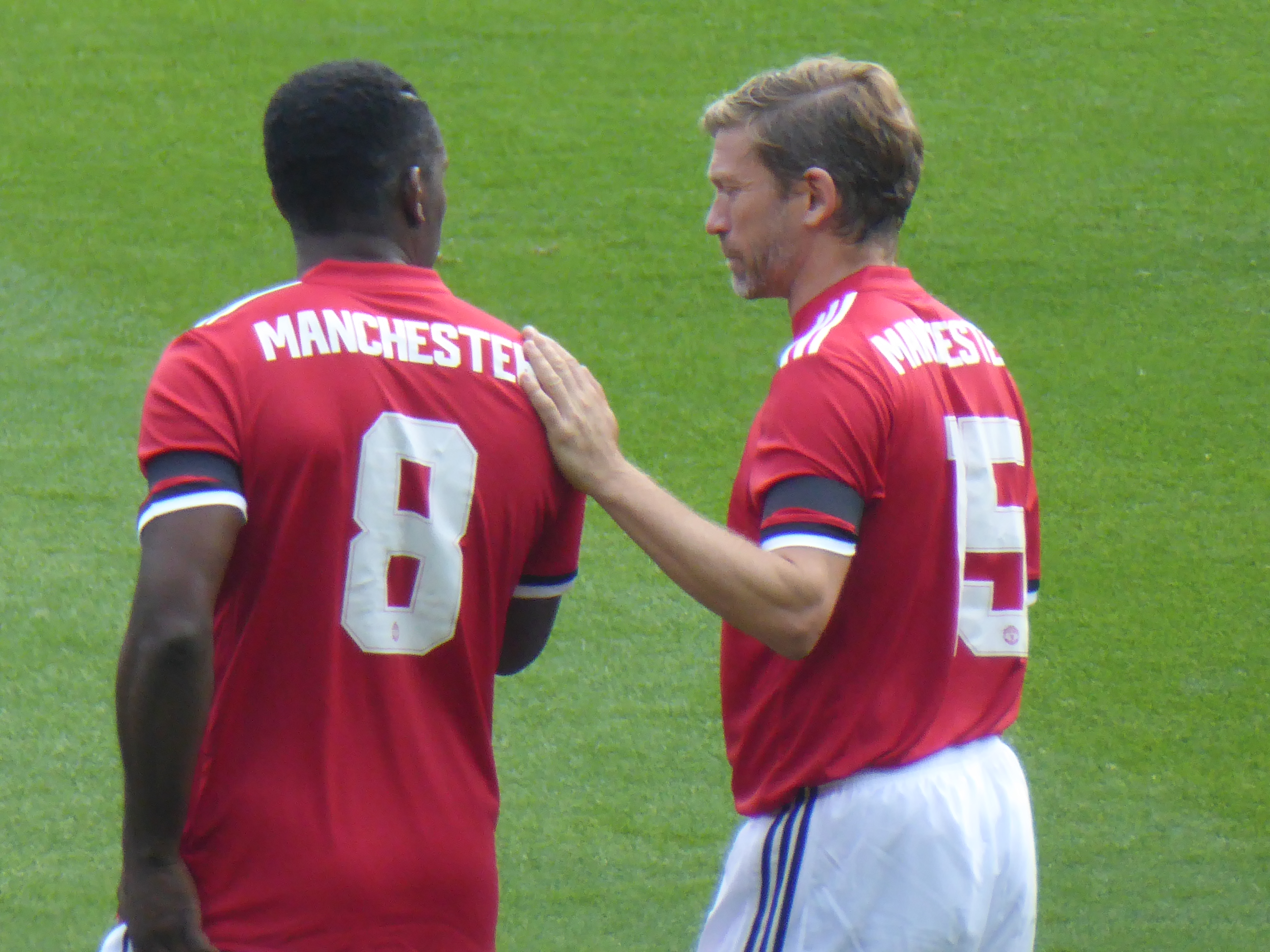
Saha playing alongside Jesper Blomqvist during Manchester United's charity match against Barcelona on 2 September 2017

On 8 August 2013, on his 35th birthday, Saha announced his retirement from professional football via Twitter. Saha joined other retired players at a testimonial match for his former Spurs teammate Ledley King on 12 May 2014. Coming on as a second-half substitute, he scored a hat-trick against a line-up of current Tottenham players. Three years later on 2 September 2017, he once again joined other retired players for a charity match against Barcelona that Manchester United won 3–0.

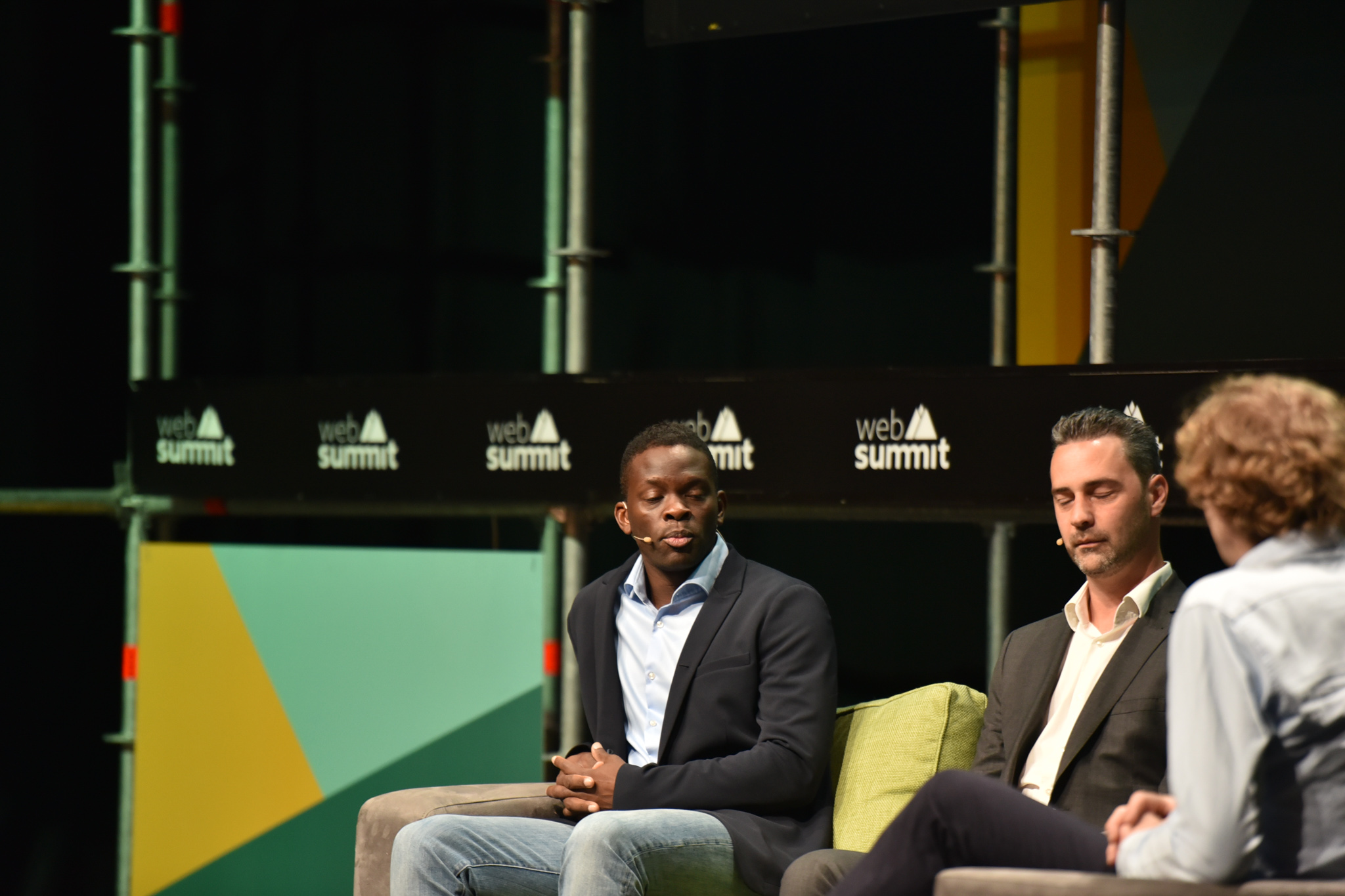
Saha's speaking at the Web Summit in 2016

Following his retirement from professional football, Saha created a private network for pro athletes and entertainers called AxisStars.

In December 2015, Saha said he would be suing a UK bank after it was revealed that a botched investment scheme resulted in him losing "around six figures." He also published his first book titled Thinking Inside the Box?.

== Personal life ==
In addition to speaking French, Saha speaks fluent English. He learned the language after moving to Fulham in 2000, where he experienced some initial struggles before improving.

Saha has three children with his former partner: Stanley, Enzo and Lou. They split up after his retirement from football. Having previously lived in Manchester, North West England, he has since moved to the south of France.

In February 2011, Saha escaped unhurt after his car collided with a fence on Altrincham Road, at the entrance to the tunnels that run under the runways of Manchester Airport.

== Career statistics ==
=== Club ===
Appearances and goals by club, season and competition
Club	Season	League			National cup (Note: Includes Coupe de France, FA Cup)		League cup (Note: Includes Coupe de la Ligue, Football League Cup)		Europe		Other		Total	
Club	Season	Division	Apps	Goals	Apps	Goals	Apps	Goals	Apps	Goals	Apps	Goals	Apps	Goals
Metz	1997–98	Division 1	21	1	2	0	0	0	3 (Note: Appearances in UEFA Cup)	0	—		26	1
Metz	1998–99	Division 1	3	0	0	0	0	0	3	0	—		6	0
Metz	1999–2000	Division 1	23	4	3	0	1	0	8	8	—		35	12
Metz	Total		47	5	5	0	1	0	14	8	0	0	67	13
Newcastle United (loan)	1998–99	Premier League	11	1	1	1	0	0	0	0	—		12	2
Fulham	2000–01	First Division	43	27	1	0	4	5	—		—		48	32
Fulham	2001–02	Premier League	36	8	6	0	2	1	—		—		44	9
Fulham	2002–03	Premier League	17	5	3	1	0	0	8	1	—		28	7
Fulham	2003–04	Premier League	21	13	1	2	0	0	—		—		22	15
Fulham	Total		117	53	11	3	6	6	8	1	0	0	142	63
Manchester United	2003–04	Premier League	12	7	0	0	0	0	2 (Note: Appearances in UEFA Champions League)	0	0	0	14	7
Manchester United	2004–05	Premier League	14	1	2	0	4	1	2	0	—		22	2
Manchester United	2005–06	Premier League	19	7	4	2	5	6	2	0	—		30	15
Manchester United	2006–07	Premier League	24	8	2	1	0	0	8	4	—		34	13
Manchester United	2007–08	Premier League	17	5	2	0	0	0	5	0	0	0	24	5
Manchester United	Total		86	28	10	3	9	7	19	4	0	0	124	42
Everton	2008–09	Premier League	24	6	3	2	1	0	1	0	—		29	8
Everton	2009–10	Premier League	33	13	1	0	1	0	5 (Note: Appearances in UEFA Europa League)	2	—		40	15
Everton	2010–11	Premier League	22	7	3	2	1	1	—		—		26	10
Everton	2011–12	Premier League	18	1	0	0	2	1	—		—		20	2
Everton	Total		97	27	7	4	5	2	6	2	0	0	115	35
Tottenham Hotspur	2011–12	Premier League	10	3	2	1	—		—		—		12	4
Sunderland	2012–13	Premier League	11	0	0	0	3	0	—		—		14	0
Lazio	2012–13	Serie A	6	0	0	0	—		0	0	—		6	0
Career total			385	117	36	12	24	15	47	15	0	0	492	159

=== International ===
Appearances and goals by national team and year
National team	Year	Apps	Goals
France	2004	8	2
France	2005	0	0
France	2006	10	2
France	2007	0	0
France	2008	0	0
France	2009	0	0
France	2010	0	0
France	2011	1	0
France	2012	1	0
Total		20	4

Scores and results list France's goal tally first, score column indicates score after each Saha goal.

List of international goals scored by Louis Saha
No.	Date	Venue	Opponent	Score	Result	Competition
1	18 February 2004	King Baudouin Stadium, Brussels, Belgium	Belgium	2–0	2–0	Friendly
2	28 May 2004	Stade de la Mosson, Montpellier, France	Andorra	3–0	4–0	Friendly
3	2 September 2006	Boris Paichadze National Stadium, Tbilisi, Georgia	Georgia	1–0	3–0	UEFA Euro 2008 qualifying
4	11 October 2006	Stade Auguste Bonal, Montbéliard, France	Faroe Islands	1–0	5–0	UEFA Euro 2008 qualifying

== Honours ==
Fulham

- Football League First Division: 2000–01
- UEFA Intertoto Cup: 2002

Manchester United

- Premier League: 2006–07, 2007–08
- Football League Cup: 2005–06
- UEFA Champions League: 2007–08

Everton

- FA Cup runner-up: 2008–09

France U18

- UEFA European Under-18 Championship: 1997

France

- FIFA World Cup runner-up: 2006

Individual

- PFA Team of the Year: 2000–01 First Division
- Premier League Player of the Month: August 2001
