= 2004–05 Peterborough United F.C. season =

Peterborough United
2004–05 season
- Manager: Barry Fry
- Stadium: London Road Stadium
- League One: 23rd (relegated)
- FA Cup: Fourth Round
- League Cup: First Round
- Football League Trophy: First Round
- Top goalscorer: League: Calum Willock (12); All: Calum Willock (12)
- Highest home attendance: 7,662 (vs Luton Town, 3 January 2005, League One)
- Lowest home attendance: 2,886 (vs MK Dons, 24 August 2004, Carling Cup)
- Average home league attendance: 4,032

The 2004–05 season saw Peterborough United compete in Football League One where they finished in 23rd position with 39 points and were relegated to League Two.

== Competitions ==
=== League One ===
==== League table ====
Pos	Team	Pld	W	D	L	GF	GA	GD	Pts	Promotion or relegation
20	Milton Keynes Dons	46	12	15	19	54	68	−14	51	
21	Torquay United (R)	46	12	15	19	55	79	−24	51	Relegation to Football League Two
22	Wrexham (R)	46	13	14	19	62	80	−18	43 (Note: Wrexham deducted 10 points for entering administration.)	Relegation to Football League Two
23	Peterborough United (R)	46	9	12	25	49	73	−24	39	Relegation to Football League Two
24	Stockport County (R)	46	6	8	32	49	98	−49	26	Relegation to Football League Two

Updated to match(es) played on May 2005. Source:
Rules for classification: 1) points; 2) goal difference; 3) number of goals scored.
(R) Relegated

==== Results summary ====
Overall								Home						Away					
Pld	W	D	L	GF	GA	GD	Pts	W	D	L	GF	GA	GD	W	D	L	GF	GA	GD
46	9	12	25	49	73	−24	39	5	6	12	27	35	−8	4	6	13	22	38	−16

==== Results by matchday ====
Game Week	1	2	3	4	5	6	7	8	9	10	11	12	13	14	15	16	17	18	19	20	21	22	23	24	25	26	27	28	29	30	31	32	33	34	35	36	37	38	39	40	41	42	43	44	45	46
Ground	H	A	A	H	A	H	H	A	H	A	H	A	A	H	H	A	H	A	H	A	H	A	H	A	A	H	H	A	H	A	H	A	H	A	A	H	H	A	H	A	H	A	H	A	H	A
Result	W	D	L	W	L	D	L	W	L	L	D	D	L	D	W	L	L	L	W	D	L	L	L	L	L	D	D	D	L	L	W	D	L	L	W	L	D	L	L	D	L	W	L	W	L	L
Position	8	7	12	5	11	13	15	13	15	18	17	17	19	17	16	19	20	20	19	20	21	21	21	22	21	22	22	23	22	22	22	22	23	22	23	23	23	23	23	23	23	23	23	23	23	23

A = Away; H = Home; W = Win; D = Draw; L = Loss; P = Postponed
Notes: Positions show the situation at the end of the corresponding Game Weeks (GW); not the position at the conclusion of matches or game days

==== League One ====
Match	Date	Opponent	Venue	Result	Attendance	Scorers	Report
1	7 August 2004	Tranmere Rovers	H	1–0	5,390	Burton	Report
2	10 August 2004	Bradford City	A	2–2	6,929	Platt, Kennedy	Report
3	14 August 2004	Colchester United	A	1–2	3,754	Farrell	Report
4	21 August 2004	Brentford	H	3–0	4,668	Platt, Legg, Clarke	Report
5	28 August 2004	Huddersfield Town	A	1–2	9,531	Woodhouse (pen)	Report
6	30 August 2004	Blackpool	H	0–0	4,142		Report
7	4 September 2004	Bristol City	H	0–1	4,227		Report
8	11 September 2004	Swindon Town	A	1–0	5,777	Jenkins	Report
9	18 September 2004	Hull City	H	2–3	5,745	Willock, Clarke	Report
10	25 September 2004	Luton Town	A	1–2	7,694	Woodhouse	Report
11	2 October 2004	Torquay United	H	1–1	3,828	Clarke	Report
12	16 October 2004	Stockport County	A	0–1	4,119		Report
13	19 October 2004	Sheffield Wednesday	H	1–1	5,875	Platt	Report
14	23 October 2004	Hartlepool United	H	3–0	3,841	Kennedy, Willock, Legg	Report
15	26 October 2004	Wrexham	A	1–1	3,009	Willock	Report
16	30 October 2004	Doncaster Rovers	A	1–2	6,039	Platt	Report
17	6 November 2004	Bournemouth	H	0–1	4,004	Platt	Report
18	20 November 2004	Walsall	A	1–2	5,465	Purser	Report
19	27 November 2004	Port Vale	H	4–0	3,785	Purser, Farrell, Boucaud, Woodhouse	Report
20	7 December 2004	Milton Keynes Dons	A	1–1	3,913	Constantine	Report
21	11 December 2004	Chesterfield	H	1–2	3,865	Woodhouse	Report
22	18 December 2004	Barnsley	A	0–4	8,536		Report
23	26 December 2004	Swindon Town	H	0–2	4,212		Report
24	28 December 2004	Oldham Athletic	A	1–2	5,618	Logan	Report
25	1 January 2005	Bristol City	A	0–2	10,873		Report
26	3 January 2005	Luton Town	H	2–2	7,662	Willock (2)	Report
27	11 January 2005	Wrexham	H	2–2	3,048	Branston	Report
28	15 January 2005	Hull City	A	2–2	16,149	Thomson, Willock	Report
29	22 January 2005	Oldham Athletic	H	1–2	4,047	Legg	Report
30	5 February 2005	Stockport County	H	2–1	3,719	Willock, Logan	Report
31	15 February 2005	Torquay United	A	1–2	2,796	Willock	Report
32	19 February 2005	Doncaster Rovers	H	0–2	4,983		Report
33	23 February 2005	Sheffield Wednesday	A	1–2	19,648	Purser	Report
34	26 February 2005	Chesterfield	A	3–1	3,715	Logan, Purser (2)	Report
35	5 March 2005	Barnsley	H	1–3	3,485	Legg	Report
36	12 March 2005	Bradford City	H	2–2	3,472	Thomson, Legg	Report
37	18 March 2005	Tranmere Rovers	A	0–5	8,401		Report
38	25 March 2005	Colchester United	H	0–3	4,048		Report
39	28 March 2005	Brentford	A	0–0	6,341		Report
40	2 April 2005	Huddersfield Town	H	1–2	3,976	Purser	Report
41	5 April 2005	Hartlepool United	A	2–2	4,579	Willock, Logan	Report
42	9 April 2005	Blackpool	A	1–0	5,090	Willock	Report
43	16 April 2005	Walsall	H	0–2	3,481		Report
44	23 April 2005	Bournemouth	A	1–0	7,929	Willock	Report
45	30 April 2005	Milton Keynes Dons	H	0–3	3,742		Report
46	7 May 2005	Port Vale	A	0–1	4,815		Report

=== FA Cup ===
Round	Date	Opponent	Venue	Result	Attendance	Scorers
R1	13 November 2004	Tranmere Rovers	H	2–1	2,940	Kennedy, Woodhouse
R2	4 December 2004	Bath City	H	2–0	4,187	Willock (2)
R3	8 January 2005	Milton Keynes Dons	A	2–0	4,407	Logan, Arber
R4	29 January 2005	Nottingham Forest	A	0–1	16,774	

=== League Cup ===
Round	Date	Opponent	Venue	Result	Attendance	Scorers
R1	24 August 2004	Milton Keynes Dons	H	0–3	2,886	

=== Football League Trophy ===
Round	Date	Opponent	Venue	Result	Attendance	Scorers
R1	29 September 2004	Bristol City	A	0–1	3,092	
