= 2001–02 Fulham F.C. season =

Fulham F.C.
2001–02 season
- Chairman: Mohamed Al-Fayed
- Manager: Jean Tigana
- Stadium: Craven Cottage
- FA Premier League: 13th
- FA Cup: Semi-finals
- League Cup: Fourth round
- Top goalscorer: League: Hayles (8); Saha (8); Malbranque (8); All: Hayles (12)
- Average home league attendance: 19,343

The 2001–02 season was Fulham F.C.'s 104th season of professional football and their first season in the Premier League. They were managed by Jean Tigana, who had also overseen their promotion from the First Division the previous season.

== Season summary ==
After the high-profile signings of Juventus goalkeeper Edwin van der Sar and Lyon striker Steve Marlet, amongst others, Fulham chairman Mohammed Al-Fayed boasted that the newly promoted side would win the Premiership title. As it was, Fulham never came anywhere near matching the pace set by the likes of Arsenal, Liverpool and Manchester United, but the Cottagers still impressed upon their return to the top flight, peaking as high as eighth at one point. The club's good form gave hope to fans that their team could challenge for European qualification either through the league or their FA Cup run, but a run of nine games without a win dragged the club down to 16th with four games left to play and four points between them and 18th-placed Ipswich. Seven points from the club's last four games lifted Fulham to safety in 13th, and, despite the poor league form and elimination from the FA Cup in the semi-finals, Fulham managed to achieve European qualification via the Intertoto Cup.

== Final league table ==
| Pos | Team | Pld | W | D | L | GF | GA | GD | Pts | Qualification or relegation |
|---|---|---|---|---|---|---|---|---|---|---|
| 11 | Southampton | 38 | 12 | 9 | 17 | 46 | 54 | −8 | 45 | |
| 12 | Middlesbrough | 38 | 12 | 9 | 17 | 35 | 47 | −12 | 45 | |
| 13 | Fulham | 38 | 10 | 14 | 14 | 36 | 44 | −8 | 44 | Qualification for the Intertoto Cup second round |
| 14 | Charlton Athletic | 38 | 10 | 14 | 14 | 38 | 49 | −11 | 44 | |
| 15 | Everton | 38 | 11 | 10 | 17 | 45 | 57 | −12 | 43 | |

Source: Premier League
Rules for classification: 1) points; 2) goal difference; 3) number of goals scored.

== Results ==
Fulham's score comes first

=== Legend ===
| Win | Draw | Loss |

=== FA Premier League ===
| Matchday | 1 | 2 | 3 | 4 | 5 | 6 | 7 | 8 | 9 | 10 | 11 | 12 | 13 | 14 | 15 | 16 | 17 | 18 | 19 | 20 | 21 | 22 | 23 | 24 | 25 | 26 | 27 | 28 | 29 | 30 | 31 | 32 | 33 | 34 | 35 | 36 | 37 | 38 |
|---|---|---|---|---|---|---|---|---|---|---|---|---|---|---|---|---|---|---|---|---|---|---|---|---|---|---|---|---|---|---|---|---|---|---|---|---|---|---|
| Ground | A | H | H | A | H | A | H | A | H | H | A | H | A | H | H | A | A | H | H | A | H | A | A | H | H | A | A | H | A | A | H | A | H | A | H | A | H | A |
| Result | L | W | D | D | L | D | D | L | D | W | W | W | D | D | W | D | L | D | L | W | W | D | L | D | W | L | L | L | L | L | L | D | L | D | W | W | D | L |
| Position | 13 | 7 | 8 | 10 | 14 | 15 | 15 | 15 | 15 | 14 | 13 | 11 | 11 | 11 | 9 | 9 | 10 | 10 | 12 | 10 | 9 | 9 | 10 | 10 | 9 | 9 | 9 | 10 | 11 | 12 | 14 | 13 | 16 | 16 | 13 | 11 | 11 | 13 |

Source: WorldFootball.com
A = Away; H = Home; W = Win; D = Draw; L = Loss

| Date | Opponent | Venue | Result | Attendance | Scorers |
|---|---|---|---|---|---|
| 19 August 2001 | Manchester United | A | 2–3 | 67,534 | Saha (2) |
| 22 August 2001 | Sunderland | H | 2–0 | 20,197 | Hayles, Saha |
| 25 August 2001 | Derby County | H | 0–0 | 15,641 | |
| 9 September 2001 | Charlton Athletic | A | 1–1 | 20,451 | Boa Morte |
| 15 September 2001 | Arsenal | H | 1–3 | 20,805 | Malbranque |
| 22 September 2001 | Leicester City | A | 0–0 | 18,918 | |
| 30 September 2001 | Chelsea | H | 1–1 | 20,197 | Hayles |
| 14 October 2001 | Aston Villa | A | 0–2 | 28,579 | |
| 21 October 2001 | Ipswich Town | H | 1–1 | 17,221 | Hayles |
| 27 October 2001 | Southampton | H | 2–1 | 18,771 | Malbranque (2) |
| 3 November 2001 | West Ham United | A | 2–0 | 26,217 | Legwinski, Malbranque |
| 17 November 2001 | Newcastle United | H | 3–1 | 21,159 | Saha, Legwinski, Hayles |
| 24 November 2001 | Bolton Wanderers | A | 0–0 | 23,848 | |
| 2 December 2001 | Leeds United | H | 0–0 | 20,918 | |
| 8 December 2001 | Everton | H | 2–0 | 19,338 | Hayles (2) |
| 12 December 2001 | Liverpool | A | 0–0 | 37,163 | |
| 15 December 2001 | Tottenham Hotspur | A | 0–4 | 36,054 | |
| 26 December 2001 | Charlton Athletic | H | 0–0 | 17,900 | |
| 30 December 2001 | Manchester United | H | 2–3 | 21,159 | Legwinski, Marlet |
| 2 January 2002 | Derby County | A | 1–0 | 28,165 | Carbonari (own goal) |
| 12 January 2002 | Middlesbrough | H | 2–1 | 18,975 | Saha, Marlet |
| 19 January 2002 | Sunderland | A | 1–1 | 45,124 | Malbranque |
| 30 January 2002 | Ipswich Town | A | 0–1 | 25,156 | |
| 2 February 2002 | Aston Villa | H | 0–0 | 20,041 | |
| 9 February 2002 | Blackburn Rovers | H | 2–0 | 19,580 | Hayles, Malbranque |
| 19 February 2002 | Middlesbrough | A | 1–2 | 26,235 | Marlet |
| 23 February 2002 | Arsenal | A | 1–4 | 38,029 | Marlet |
| 2 March 2002 | Liverpool | H | 0–2 | 21,103 | |
| 6 March 2002 | Chelsea | A | 2–3 | 39,744 | Saha (2, 1 pen) |
| 16 March 2002 | Everton | A | 1–2 | 34,639 | Malbranque |
| 24 March 2002 | Tottenham Hotspur | H | 0–2 | 15,885 | |
| 30 March 2002 | Southampton | A | 1–1 | 31,616 | Marlet |
| 1 April 2002 | West Ham United | H | 0–1 | 19,416 | |
| 8 April 2002 | Newcastle United | A | 1–1 | 50,017 | Saha |
| 20 April 2002 | Leeds United | A | 1–0 | 39,111 | Malbranque |
| 23 April 2002 | Bolton Wanderers | H | 3–0 | 18,107 | Goldbæk, Marlet, Hayles |
| 27 April 2002 | Leicester City | H | 0–0 | 21,106 | |
| 11 May 2002 | Blackburn Rovers | A | 0–3 | 30,487 | |

=== FA Cup ===
| Round | Date | Opponent | Venue | Result | Attendance | Goalscorers |
|---|---|---|---|---|---|---|
| R3 | 8 January 2002 | Wycombe Wanderers | A | 2–2 | 9,921 | Legwinski, Marlet |
| R3R | 15 January 2002 | Wycombe Wanderers | H | 1–0 | 11,894 | Hayles |
| R4 | 26 January 2002 | York City | A | 2–0 | 7,563 | Malbranque, Marlet |
| R5 | 16 February 2002 | Walsall | A | 2–1 | 8,766 | Bennett (own goal), Barry Hayles |
| QF | 10 March 2002 | West Bromwich Albion | A | 1–0 | 24,811 | Marlet |
| SF | 14 April 2002 | Chelsea | N | 0–1 | 36,147 | |

=== League Cup ===
| Round | Date | Opponent | Venue | Result | Attendance | Goalscorers |
|---|---|---|---|---|---|---|
| R2 | 11 September 2001 | Rochdale | A | 2–2 (won 6–5 on pens) | 6,303 | Boa Morte, Brevett |
| R3 | 10 October 2001 | Derby County | H | 5–2 | 9,217 | Hayles, Legwinski, Collins, Saha, Malbranque (pen) |
| R4 | 29 November 2001 | Tottenham Hotspur | H | 1–2 | 17,006 | Hayles |

== Players ==
=== First-team squad ===
Squad at end of season

Note: Flags indicate national team as defined under FIFA eligibility rules; some limited exceptions apply. Players may hold more than one non-FIFA nationality.

| No. | Pos. | Nation | Player |
|---|---|---|---|
| 1 | GK | NED | Edwin van der Sar |
| 2 | DF | IRL | Steve Finnan |
| 3 | DF | ENG | Rufus Brevett |
| 4 | DF | WAL | Andy Melville (captain) |
| 7 | MF | ENG | Jon Harley |
| 8 | MF | ENG | Lee Clark |
| 9 | FW | FRA | Steve Marlet |
| 10 | MF | SCO | John Collins |
| 12 | GK | NIR | Maik Taylor (Note: Taylor was born in Hildesheim, West Germany (now Germany), but qualified to represent any of the home nations internationally as he holds a British passport, and made his international debut for Northern Ireland in 1999.) |
| 14 | MF | FRA | Steed Malbranque (Note: Malbranque was born in Mouscron, Belgium, but also qualified to represent France internationally, and represented them at U-21 level. He would be called up to the senior international side in February 2004, but he would not play.) |
| 15 | FW | JAM | Barry Hayles (Note: Hayles was born in Lambeth, England, but also qualified to represent Jamaica internationally and made his international debut for Jamaica in June 2001, having previously represented the Cayman Islands internationally despite being ineligible to do so.) |

| No. | Pos. | Nation | Player |
|---|---|---|---|
| 16 | DF | ENG | Zat Knight |
| 18 | MF | FRA | Sylvain Legwinski |
| 19 | MF | DEN | Bjarne Goldbæk |
| 20 | FW | FRA | Louis Saha |
| 22 | MF | POR | Luís Boa Morte |
| 23 | MF | ENG | Sean Davis |
| 24 | DF | FRA | Alain Goma |
| 25 | DF | MAR | Abdeslam Ouaddou |
| 31 | MF | USA | Eddie Lewis |
| 33 | FW | ENG | Calum Willock (Note: Willock was born in Lambeth, England, but also qualified to represent Saint Kitts and Nevis internationally and would make his international debut for Saint Kitts and Nevis in 2004.) |
| 40 | MF | LVA | Andrejs Štolcers |

=== Left club during season ===
Note: Flags indicate national team as defined under FIFA eligibility rules; some limited exceptions apply. Players may hold more than one non-FIFA nationality.

| No. | Pos. | Nation | Player |
|---|---|---|---|
| 6 | DF | WAL | Kit Symons (to Crystal Palace) |
| 26 | MF | ENG | Kevin Betsy (Note: Betsy was born in Woking, England, but also qualified to represent Seychelles internationally and would make his international debut for Seychelles in 2011.) (to Barnsley) |

| No. | Pos. | Nation | Player |
|---|---|---|---|
| 29 | MF | WAL | Paul Trollope (Note: Trollope was born in Swindon, England, but also qualified to represent Wales internationally and made his international debut for Wales in May 1997.) (to Coventry City) |
| — | DF | WAL | Alan Neilson (Note: Neilson was born in Wegberg, West Germany (now Germany), but also qualified to represent Wales internationally and made his international debut for Wales in February 1992.) (to Grimsby Town) |

=== Reserve squad ===
Note: Flags indicate national team as defined under FIFA eligibility rules; some limited exceptions apply. Players may hold more than one non-FIFA nationality.

| No. | Pos. | Nation | Player |
|---|---|---|---|
| 5 | DF | WAL | Chris Coleman |
| 30 | GK | ENG | Glyn Thompson |
| 32 | GK | USA | Marcus Hahnemann |
| 34 | FW | GHA | Elvis Hammond |
| 35 | DF | SCO | Kieran McAnespie (Note: McAnespie was born in Gosport, England, but also qualified to represent Scotland internationally, and represented them at U-21 level.) |
| 36 | DF | ENG | Mark Hudson |
| 38 | FW | ENG | Luke Cornwall |
| — | GK | ENG | James Bittner |
| — | GK | ENG | Ross Flitney |
| — | DF | ENG | Adam Green |

| No. | Pos. | Nation | Player |
|---|---|---|---|
| — | DF | ENG | Tom Hutchinson |
| — | DF | ENG | Zesh Rehman (Note: Rehman was born in Birmingham, England and represented them at U-18, U-19 and U-20 level, but qualified to represent Pakistan internationally through his parents and would make his international debut for Pakistan in December 2005.) |
| — | DF | ENG | Dean Leacock |
| — | MF | ENG | Sean Doherty |
| — | MF | ENG | Jermaine Hunter |
| — | MF | ENG | Darren Pratley |
| — | MF | IRL | Michael Timlin (Note: Timlin was born in Peckham, England, but also qualified to represent the Republic of Ireland internationally and represented them at U-17 and U-21 level.) |
| — | FW | ENG | Neil Lampton |
| — | FW | SCO | Stuart Noble |

== Transfers ==
=== In ===
| Date | Pos. | Name | From | Fee |
|---|---|---|---|---|
| 25 July 2001 | MF | (England) Sean Doherty | (England) Everton | Undisclosed |
| 1 August 2001 | GK | (Netherlands) Edwin van Der Sar | (Italy) Juventus | Undisclosed (estimated £7,000,000) |
| 1 August 2001 | DF | (Morocco) Abdeslam Ouaddou | (France) Nancy | £2,000,000 |
| 2 August 2001 | MF | (France) (Belgium) Steed Malbranque | (France) Lyon | £5,000,000 |
| 8 August 2001 | DF | (England) Jon Harley | (England) Chelsea | £3,500,000 |
| 22 August 2001 | MF | (France) (Poland) Sylvain Legwinski | (France) Bordeaux | £3,300,000 |
| 29 August 2001 | FW | (France) Steve Marlet | (France) Lyon | £11,500,000 |

- Luís Boa Morte - Southampton
- Matt Clarke - Bradford City (loan)

=== Out ===
- Terry Phelan - Sheffield United
- Paul Peschisolido - Sheffield United
- Simon Morgan - Brighton and Hove Albion
- Wayne Collins - Crewe Alexandra
- Karl-Heinz Riedle - Retired
- James Bittner
- Jacopo Galbiati

== Player statistics ==
=== Appearances and goals ===
| No. | Pos | Nat | Player | Total | | Premier League | | FA Cup | | League Cup | |
| No. | Pos | Nat | Player | Apps | Goals | Apps | Goals | Apps | Goals | Apps | Goals |
Goalkeepers
| 1 | GK | (Netherlands) NED | Edwin van der Sar | 41 | 0 | 37 | 0 | 4 | 0 | 0 | 0 |
| 12 | GK | (Northern Ireland) NIR | Maik Taylor | 6 | 0 | 1 | 0 | 2 | 0 | 3 | 0 |
Defenders
| 2 | DF | (Republic of Ireland) IRL | Steve Finnan | 47 | 0 | 38 | 0 | 6 | 0 | 3 | 0 |
| 3 | DF | (England) ENG | Rufus Brevett | 43 | 1 | 34+1 | 0 | 6 | 0 | 1+1 | 1 |
| 4 | DF | (Wales) WAL | Andy Melville | 43 | 0 | 35 | 0 | 5+1 | 0 | 1+1 | 0 |
| 7 | DF | (England) ENG | Jon Harley | 13 | 0 | 5+5 | 0 | 0+1 | 0 | 2 | 0 |
| 16 | DF | (England) ENG | Zat Knight | 15 | 0 | 8+2 | 0 | 3 | 0 | 2 | 0 |
| 24 | DF | (France) FRA | Alain Goma | 40 | 0 | 32+1 | 0 | 6 | 0 | 1 | 0 |
| 25 | DF | (Morocco) MAR | Abdeslam Ouaddou | 12 | 0 | 4+4 | 0 | 1+1 | 0 | 2 | 0 |
Midfielders
| 8 | MF | (England) ENG | Lee Clark | 12 | 0 | 5+4 | 0 | 0 | 0 | 3 | 0 |
| 10 | MF | (Scotland) SCO | John Collins | 41 | 1 | 29+5 | 0 | 5 | 0 | 2 | 1 |
| 14 | MF | (France) FRA | Steed Malbranque | 46 | 10 | 33+4 | 8 | 6 | 1 | 1+2 | 1 |
| 18 | MF | (France) FRA | Sylvain Legwinski | 40 | 5 | 30+3 | 3 | 5 | 1 | 1+1 | 1 |
| 19 | MF | (Denmark) DEN | Bjarne Goldbæk | 17 | 1 | 8+5 | 1 | 0+2 | 0 | 2 | 0 |
| 22 | MF | (Portugal) POR | Luís Boa Morte | 29 | 2 | 15+8 | 1 | 2+1 | 0 | 2+1 | 1 |
| 23 | MF | (England) ENG | Sean Davis | 37 | 0 | 25+5 | 0 | 3+1 | 0 | 3 | 0 |
| 31 | MF | (United States) USA | Eddie Lewis | 1 | 0 | 1 | 0 | 0 | 0 | 0 | 0 |
| 40 | MF | (Latvia) LVA | Andrejs Štolcers | 6 | 0 | 0+5 | 0 | 0+1 | 0 | 0 | 0 |
Forwards
| 9 | FW | (France) FRA | Steve Marlet | 33 | 9 | 21+5 | 6 | 5+1 | 3 | 1 | 0 |
| 15 | FW | (Jamaica) JAM | Barry Hayles | 43 | 12 | 27+8 | 8 | 2+3 | 2 | 3 | 2 |
| 20 | FW | (France) FRA | Louis Saha | 44 | 9 | 28+8 | 8 | 5+1 | 0 | 0+2 | 1 |
| 33 | FW | (England) ENG | Calum Willock | 2 | 0 | 0+2 | 0 | 0 | 0 | 0 | 0 |
Players transferred out during the season
| 6 | DF | (Wales) WAL | Kit Symons | 4 | 0 | 2+2 | 0 | 0 | 0 | 0 | 0 |
| 26 | MF | (England) ENG | Kevin Betsy | 1 | 0 | 0+1 | 0 | 0 | 0 | 0 | 0 |

Last updated: 19 May 2002
Source: Competitions

== Club ==
=== Management ===
| Position | Staff |
|---|---|
| Manager | (France) Jean Tigana |
| First-team coach | (France) Christian Damiano |
| Goalkeeping Coach | (England) Gerry Peyton |
| Fitness Coach | (France) Roger Propos |
| Academy Coach | (Scotland) Steve Kean |
| Physiotherapist | (England) Jason Palmer |
| Club Doctor | (England) Charlotte Cowie |
| Chief Scout | (England) John Marshall |

Last updated: 22 Feb 2002
Source: Fulham FC

=== Other information ===
| Chairman | (Egypt) Mohamed Al Fayed |
| Vice Chairman | (England) Bill Muddyman |
| Deputy Managing Director | (United States) Lee Hoos |
| Acting Managing Director | (England) Mark Collins |
| Director | (Egypt) Omar Fayed |
| Director | (Egypt) Karim Fayed |
| Director | (England) Andy Muddyman |
| Finance Director | (England) Andy Ambler |
| Stadium Director | (England) Peter Randles |
| Sales & Marketing Director | (England) Juliet Slot |
| Ground (capacity and dimensions) | Craven Cottage (26,600 / 112x72 yards) |

Updated to match played 16 Dec 2001
Source: Fulham FC
