= Calum Willock =

Footballer (born 1981)

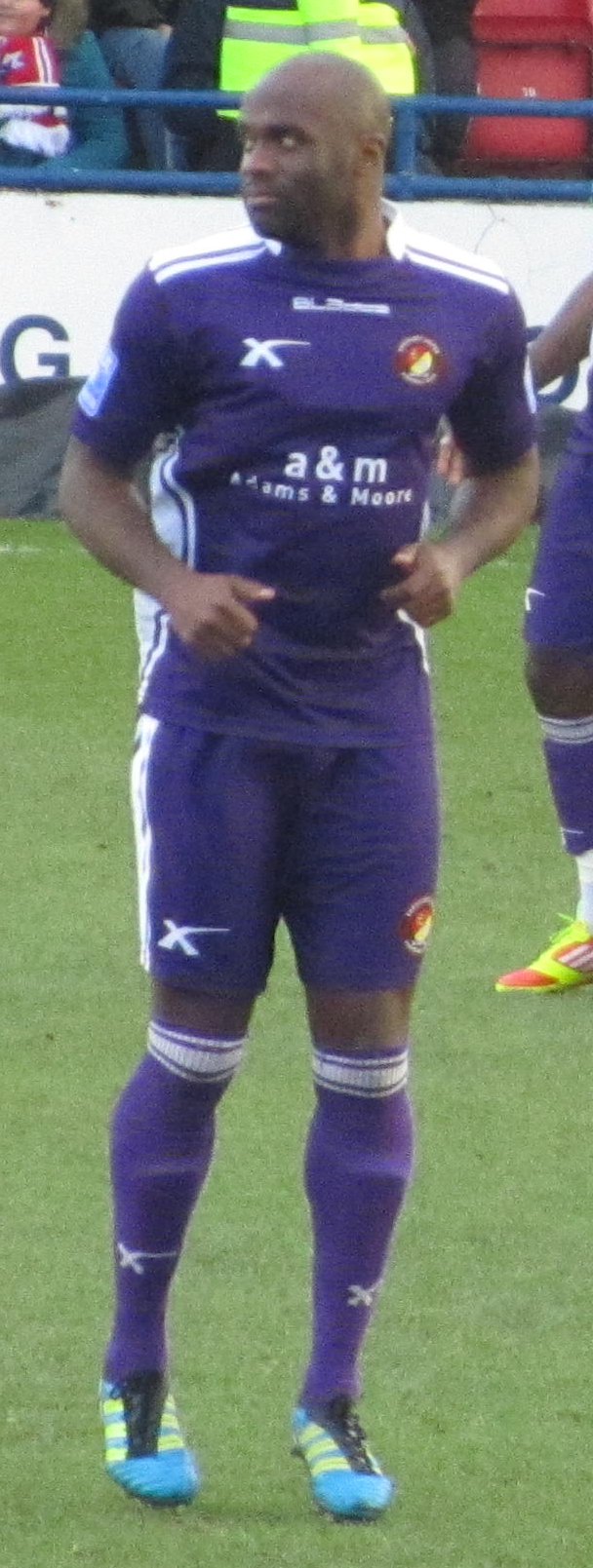
- Willock playing for Ebbsfleet United in 2012

Personal information
- Full name: Calum Daniel Willock
- Date of birth: 29 October 1981 (age 45)
- Place of birth: Lambeth, England
- Height: 5 ft 11 in (1.80 m)
- Position: Forward

Youth career
- ?–2000: Fulham

Senior career*
Years	Team	Apps	(Gls)
2000–2003	Fulham	5	(0)
2002	→ Queens Park Rangers (loan)	3	(0)
2003	→ Bristol Rovers (loan)	5	(0)
2003	→ Peterborough United (loan)	7	(1)
2003–2006	Peterborough United	72	(23)
2006–2007	Brentford	41	(4)
2007–2008	Port Vale	15	(3)
2008–2009	Stevenage Borough	38	(5)
2009–2010	Crawley Town	16	(2)
2010	→ Cambridge United (loan)	14	(0)
2010–2012	Ebbsfleet United	86	(39)
2012–2013	Dover Athletic	27	(5)
2013	Boreham Wood	6	(0)
2013	→ Harrow Borough (loan)	9	(0)
2014–2015	Staines Town	39	(7)
2015	Lewes	10	(0)
2015	Dulwich Hamlet	15	(5)
2015–2017	Merstham		
2017	Farnborough	2	(0)
2018–2019	Cray Valley Paper Mills		
Total		407	(93)

International career
2004	Saint Kitts and Nevis	3	(3)
- * Club domestic league appearances and goals

Calum Daniel Willock (born 29 October 1981) is a former professional footballer who played as a forward. In his career, he played in each of the top seven levels of English football. Born in England, he represented the Saint Kitts and Nevis national team internationally.

Beginning his career with Fulham in 2000, he enjoyed loan spells with Queens Park Rangers, Bristol Rovers, and Peterborough United, before switching permanently to Peterborough in 2003. In 2006, he signed with Brentford, moving to Port Vale in summer 2007. He switched to Stevenage Borough in January 2008 before joining Crawley Town the following year. He played on loan at Cambridge United 2010, before transferring to Ebbsfleet United later in the year. He helped the club to win promotion out of the Conference South in 2011 before he returned to the division when he signed with Dover Athletic in June 2012. He joined Boreham Wood in July 2013 and was dual registered with Harrow Borough before he joined Staines Town in January 2014. He moved on to Lewes in February 2015 before going on to join Merstham via Dulwich Hamlet later in the year. He went on to help Cray Valley Paper Mills win the Southern Counties East League Premier Division title in 2018–19 and also played on the losing side in the 2019 FA Vase final.

== Club career ==
Willock started his career at Fulham, impressing manager Gary Brazil enough to win the chance to sign schoolboy forms at the club. He made his professional debut as a substitute in the First Division on 4 November 2000, in a 3–0 over Huddersfield Town at Craven Cottage. The youngster played no further part in the season. He played two games of the 2001–02 Premier League season, both against Blackburn Rovers, both times the home side winning. In November 2002, he was loaned out to Queens Park Rangers of the Second Division, playing three games. Willock went on to say playing in the Premier League was a "dream coming true".

At the start of the 2003–04 season, he joined Fourth Division club Bristol Rovers. In two months, he made just five appearances, all as a substitute, though at age 21, he had now played at every level of the English Football League. In October 2003, he joined Peterborough United of the Third Division on loan. He scored his first professional goal on 1 November in a 2–2 draw with Brighton & Hove Albion at London Road. On 17 December the loan deal was made permanent for an undisclosed fee. He finished the season with nine goals for the "Posh". He started the 2004–05 season struggling with hamstring trouble, also fighting a calf injury at the end of the season, as well as rumours of a big money move to Gillingham. Despite all this he finished the season with 14 goals, though this was not enough to save Peterborough from relegation to League Two.

Willock was signed by Brentford on the last day of the 2006 January transfer window as a replacement for DJ Campbell, for an undisclosed fee. The "Bees" finished the 2005–06 in third place in League One, though failed to gain promotion. Despite being on the transfer list and receiving interest from Mark Wright of Chester City, Willock was a regular in the Brentford team in the 2006–07 season, due to the serious groin injury sustained by striker Lloyd Owusu. After the signing of Neil Shipperley, Willock dropped to the bench. Brentford released him in May 2007.

In August 2007, Willock had a trial with Martin Foyle's Port Vale. He was soon signed on a short-term deal, due to finish at the end of the year. The first ten games of his 2007–08 season went without a goal before he scored in an FA Cup encounter with Morecambe. He was to score a further three goals in nine games before being released in January 2008 by new manager Lee Sinnott, after Willock rejected a longer contract at the club. He quickly signed for Stevenage Borough of the Conference National. Willock struck six times in 31 games during the 2008–09 season. He was an unused substitute in the FA Trophy 2009 final, and was released by Stevenage in May 2009.

On 28 July 2009, Willock scored twice for AFC Wimbledon in a friendly against a Fulham XI. However, a day later it was announced that Willock would not be joining the club as both parties were unable to reach an agreement regarding Willock's contract demands. He joined Crawley Town on a short-term contract in September. He later signed an extended deal, and went on to play 16 games for the club. Willock joined Cambridge United in February 2010, playing 14 games for the club. At the end of the season, he was a free agent.

In August 2010, he joined Conference South side Ebbsfleet United. He told the press that he believed Liam Daish's team would achieve promotion at the first attempt, before going on to fulfil this prophecy by scoring in the club's 4–2 play-off final victory over Farnborough. Finishing as "Fleet's" top scorer, he was rewarded with a new one-year deal. Both Willock and the club took to life in the Conference National well, as he scored 19 league goals in 2011–12 to help the Stonebridge Road club to a comfortable mid-table finish.

He dropped back into the Conference South in June 2012 to sign a contract with Dover Athletic. He played in the 3–2 play-off final defeat to Salisbury City on 12 May 2013.

He joined Boreham Wood, also of the Conference South, in July 2013. He was dual registered with Isthmian League club Harrow Borough to help him overcome an injury. He signed with Conference South rivals Staines Town in January 2014, in a move that reunited him with the manager Marcus Gayle, his former teammate at Brentford. He played 19 games for the "Swans" in the second half of the 2013–14 season as the club posted an eighth-place finish. He scored six goals in 20 games in the first half of the 2014–15 season, before joining Isthmian League side Lewes in February 2015. The "Rooks" finished 19th in the Premier Division in 2014–15.

After his release from Lewes at the end of the season, he signed forms with Dulwich Hamlet ahead of the start of the 2015–16 Isthmian League Premier Division campaign following a successful trial period in pre-season, with the signing being funded by the 12th Man Scheme. He scored just three minutes into his debut, a 3–0 win over Canvey Island, before scoring again in his second game, a 2–0 win over Merstham. He went on to score seven goals in 19 appearances in all competitions before his release from the club in November 2015, with Hamlet manager Gavin Rose commenting "Calum made a fantastic contribution to our club in the time he was with us and was also a great person to have in the dressing room. I'd like to wish him every success and I'm sure he has a long term future in football well beyond his playing days." Later in the month he signed with Merstham. Merstham finished tenth in the 2015–16 campaign and then 14th in 2016–17.

Willock went on to join Southern Counties East League Premier Division club Cray Valley Paper Mills. The "Millers" won the league title at the end of the 2018–19 season and reached the 2019 FA Vase final. Willock was a late substitute in the final at Wembley Stadium, which Mills lost 3–1 to Chertsey Town after extra time.

== International career ==
Willock represented Saint Kitts & Nevis at international level, earning a total of three caps in 2004. He scored twice against Barbados in a 3–2 win on 19 June 2004 in a 2006 FIFA World Cup qualification qualifying game.

== Career statistics ==
Appearances and goals by club, season and competition
Club	Season	League			FA Cup		League Cup		Other		Total	
Club	Season	Division	Apps	Goals	Apps	Goals	Apps	Goals	Apps	Goals	Apps	Goals
Fulham	2000–01	First Division	1	0	0	0	0	0	—		1	0
Fulham	2001–02	Premier League	2	0	0	0	0	0	—		2	0
Fulham	2002–03	Premier League	2	0	0	0	0	0	0	0	2	0
Fulham	Total		5	0	0	0	0	0	0	0	5	0
Queens Park Rangers (loan)	2002–03	Second Division	3	0	0	0	—		—		3	0
Bristol Rovers (loan)	2003–04	Third Division	5	0	0	0	0	0	0	0	5	0
Peterborough United	2003–04	Second Division	29	8	2	1	0	0	0	0	31	9
Peterborough United	2004–05	League One	35	12	3	2	0	0	0	0	38	14
Peterborough United	2005–06	League Two	15	3	2	0	0	0	0	0	17	3
Peterborough United	Total		79	23	7	3	0	0	0	0	86	26
Brentford	2005–06	League One	13	1	0	0	—		—		13	1
Brentford	2006–07	League One	28	3	0	0	1	0	0	0	29	3
Brentford	Total		41	4	0	0	1	0	0	0	42	4
Port Vale	2007–08	League One	15	3	3	1	1	0	1 (Note: Appearance in Football League Trophy)	0	20	4
Stevenage Borough	2007–08	Conference Premier	9	1	0	0	―		0	0	9	1
Stevenage Borough	2008–09	Conference Premier	29	4	2	2	―		0	0	31	6
Stevenage Borough	Total		38	5	2	2	―		0	0	40	7
Crawley Town	2009–10	Conference Premier	16	2	0	0	―		0	0	16	2
Cambridge United (loan)	2009–10	Conference Premier	14	0	0	0	―		0	0	14	0
Ebbsfleet United	2010–11	Conference South	43	20	2	2	―		0	0	45	22
Ebbsfleet United	2011–12	Conference Premier	43	19	2	0	―		0	0	45	19
Ebbsfleet United	Total		86	39	4	2	―		0	0	90	41
Dover Athletic	2012–13	Conference South	27	5	1	0	―		4 (Note: 2 appearances in Conference South play-offs, 2 appearances and 1 goal in FA Trophy)	1	32	6
Boreham Wood	2013–14	Conference South	6	0	0	0	―		0	0	6	0
Harrow Borough (loan)	2013–14	Isthmian League; Premier Division	9	0	0	0	―		1 (Note: Appearance in FA Trophy)	0	10	0
Staines Town	2013–14	Conference South	19	1	0	0	―		0	0	19	1
Staines Town	2014–15	Conference South	20	6	0	0	―		0	0	20	6
Staines Town	Total		39	7	0	0	―		0	0	39	7
Lewes	2014–15	Isthmian League; Premier Division	10	0	0	0	―		1	0	11	0
Dulwich Hamlet	2015–16	Isthmian League; Premier Division	15	5	1	0	―		3 (Note: 2 appearances and 2 goals in Isthmian League Cup, 1 appearance in FA Trophy)	2	19	7
Merstham	2016–17	Isthmian League; Premier Division	3	1	0	0	―		0	0	3	1
Farnborough	2017–18	Southern League; Premier Division South	2	0	0	0	―		0	0	2	0
Career total (Note: Statistics for Merstham and Cray Valley Paper Mills not known.)			413	94	18	8	2	0	10	3	443	105

== Honours ==
Fulham

- Football League First Division: 2000–01

Stevenage Borough

- FA Trophy: 2008–09

Ebbsfleet United

- Conference South play-offs: 2011

Cray Valley Paper Mills

- Southern Counties East League Premier Division: 2018–19
- FA Vase runner-up: 2019
