= Derek Fazackerley =

English footballer

Personal information
- Full name: Derek William Fazackerley
- Date of birth: 5 November 1951 (age 74)
- Place of birth: Preston, England
- Height: 5 ft 11 in (1.80 m)
- Position: Central defender

Team information
- Current team: Oxford United (Assistant Manager)

Youth career
- Blackburn Rovers

Senior career*
Years	Team	Apps	(Gls)
1969–1987	Blackburn Rovers	596	(23)
1987–1988	Chester City	66	(0)
1988	York City	16	(0)
1988	Bury	14	(0)
1990	Kumu	17	(0)
Total		709	(23)

Managerial career
- 2018: Oxford United (caretaker)
- * Club domestic league appearances and goals

Derek William Fazackerley (born 5 November 1951) is an English former footballer who was previously assistant manager at Oxford United, and managed the club on a caretaker basis for two months in 2018. He spent the majority of his career playing for Blackburn Rovers.

== Playing career ==
Fazackerley made a record 671 appearances for Blackburn in an 18-year career. In February 2019 he was one of the first seven players to be inducted into the club's Hall of Fame.

== Coaching career ==
In January 1987, he joined Chester City as a player and assistant manager. The long-term plan was for qualified coach Fazackerley to succeed Harry McNally as manager, but he grew unhappy at the lack of progress at the club. He moved on in the summer of 1988 to York City to assist ex-Rovers manager Bobby Saxton. In February 1989, he joined Bury where Martin Dobson was manager and ended the season helping run the side after Dobson departed. This was his final playing season in professional football.

In May 1990, he became player-manager of Kumu in Finland before moving to Newcastle United as first team coach. He was involved in the England setup as assistant manager under Kevin Keegan, working alongside Les Reed.

He has since coached at other clubs, including Blackburn, Bolton Wanderers and Barnsley.

He was a scout for Manchester City and sat alongside Sven-Göran Eriksson on the bench at City's matches during his only season in charge. His position at the club was placed under review following Eriksson's departure, and left in July after Mark Hughes was appointed as manager.

On 11 December 2008, Fazackerley was appointed as first team coach at Football League One side Huddersfield Town, following the appointment of Lee Clark as manager.

On 4 October 2010, Fazackerley was appointed as assistant manager at Football League Championship side Leicester City, following the appointment of Sven-Göran Eriksson as manager. Fazackerley left the club in October 2011.

When Clark took over as manager of Birmingham City in June 2012, he appointed Fazackerley to the role of first-team coach. On 17 February 2014, it was widely reported that he and assistant manager Terry McDermott had left Birmingham; the club stated they had "no comment to issue on the matter at this moment in time."

Fazackerley joined Oxford United as assistant manager under Michael Appleton on 21 July 2014. He remained at the club when Appleton joined Leicester City as assistant manager at the end of the 2016–17 season, and when Appleton's successor Pep Clotet was sacked in January 2018, Fazackerley took over as caretaker manager. He was in charge for two months, during which time the team won twice in eight games, before the appointment of Karl Robinson on 22 March 2018. He left his coaching position in 2020, though he retained an advisory position at the club and was involved in the recruitment of Robinson's successor, Liam Manning, in 2023. He left the club altogether in September 2026.

== Bibliography ==
- Sumner, Chas (1997). On the Borderline: The Official History of Chester City F.C. 1885–1997. Yore Publications. ISBN 978-1-874427-52-0.
