= Barry Hayles =

Footballer (born 1972)

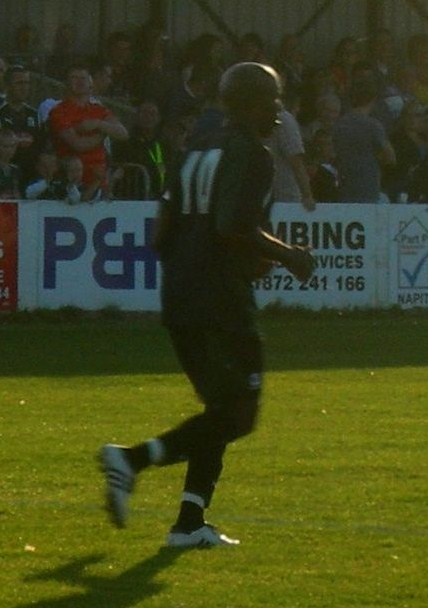
- Hayles playing for Plymouth Argyle in 2007

Personal information
- Full name: Barrington Edward Hayles
- Date of birth: 17 May 1972 (age 54)
- Place of birth: Lambeth, South London, England
- Height: 1.75 m (5 ft 9 in)
- Position: Striker

Senior career*
Years	Team	Apps	(Gls)
1989–1994	Willesden Hawkeye	?	(?)
1994–1997	Stevenage Borough	117	(60)
1997–1998	Bristol Rovers	62	(32)
1998–2004	Fulham	175	(44)
2004	Sheffield United	4	(0)
2004–2006	Millwall	55	(16)
2006–2008	Plymouth Argyle	62	(15)
2008–2009	Leicester City	28	(2)
2008	→ Cheltenham Town (loan)	7	(3)
2008	→ Cheltenham Town (loan)	5	(1)
2009–2010	Cheltenham Town	39	(7)
2010–2012	Truro City	76	(27)
2012	St Albans City	17	(6)
2012–2013	Truro City	23	(6)
2013–2014	Arlesey Town	29	(11)
2014–2015	Truro City	32	(6)
2015–2017	Chesham United	54	(10)
2017–2019	Windsor	42	(13)
2019–2022	Merstham	15	(1)
2022–2023	Windsor	12	(1)
Total		854+	(261+)

International career
1995–1997	England C	2	(2)
2001–2005	Jamaica	10	(0)

Managerial career
- 2019–2022: Merstham (assistant)
- * Club domestic league appearances and goals

Barrington Edward Hayles (born 17 May 1972) is a football coach and former player who played as a striker. Born in England, he was capped ten times by Jamaica at international level.

Hayles began his career in non-League with Willesden Hawkeye and Stevenage Borough, before making more than 350 Football League appearances for Bristol Rovers, Fulham, Sheffield United, Millwall, Plymouth Argyle, Leicester City and Cheltenham Town. He played 215 games over six seasons at Fulham, including 75 in the Premier League and nine in European competition.

Hayles returned to non-League in 2010, featuring for Truro City, St Albans City, Arlesey Town, Chesham United, Merstham and Windsor. During his time at Merstham, Hayles also served as the club's assistant manager.

Hayles finally called time on his playing days in 2023, at the age of 51. In a career that spanned 34 years and fifteen clubs, he played over 1,150 competitive matches (the first Jamaican to achieve the feat, since the time matches are recorded).

== Club career ==
=== Early career ===
Hayles was born in Lambeth, South London. After beginning his career with Willesden Hawkeye in the early 1990s, he joined Isthmian League Premier Division side Stevenage Borough in February 1994, and impressed with the club in his first two seasons there. He was part of the team which won the Football Conference in the 1995–96 season, however when the club were denied promotion to the Football League he became interested in a move away from Broadhall Way. In 1997, after continuing to impress with Stevenage Borough, he earned a move to Football League club Bristol Rovers.

=== Bristol Rovers ===
Hayles impressed immediately, scoring on his debut against Plymouth Argyle with a first half header, and went on to top the Second Division scoring chart in his first season with 23 league goals as Rovers narrowly lost 4–3 on aggregate to Northampton Town in the playoffs. After beginning the 1998–99 season brightly, Hayles earned a £2 million move to Fulham.

=== Fulham ===
Hayles made over 200 appearances during his spell at Fulham, scoring 44 league goals and helping them to two promotions. He was integral to the team that got promoted to the Premier League for the first time in their history in 2001. Highlights during his time in the Premier League included scoring an equaliser against rivals Chelsea, a brace in a 2–0 win over Everton and another brace as Fulham memorably beat Tottenham Hotspur 3–0 at White Hart Lane. During his time at Fulham, he was also called up for international duty for Jamaica.

=== Sheffield United ===
Hayles was released on a free transfer joining Sheffield United. His spell with the Blades was not a success and he moved to Millwall for a nominal fee two months later.

=== Millwall ===
Hayles signed for Millwall aged 32, making over 50 league appearances and scoring 16 goals during his two-year spell at the club. In the 2004–05 season, he notably scored in the local derby against West Ham United and a hat trick away at Derby County helping Millwall to finish 10th.

=== Plymouth Argyle ===
Hayles was signed by Plymouth Argyle by new manager Ian Holloway for a fee of £100,000 prior to the 2006–07 season, where he quickly established himself as a supporters' favourite after a hugely impressive start which earned him the nickname "The Ox in the box". He made his Argyle debut against Wolverhampton Wanderers, where he also scored his first goal for his new club. He has a record of never being on a losing side when scoring for Argyle (14 goals, 7 wins and 7 draws) up to 28 April 2007. In the 2007–08 season, Hayles planned to leave Plymouth at the end of the season.

=== Leicester City ===
On 31 December 2007, Hayles joined Leicester City on an emergency loan, which became permanent for a fee of £150,000 on 2 January, signing an 18-month contract. He made his debut in a 3–1 away defeat to Queens Park Rangers on 1 January, and scored his first goal in a 2–0 win over Coventry City on 12 January, Hayles scored his second and last goal for the club in a 1–0 win over Crystal Palace on 28 January. Leicester was relegated from the Championship at the end of the season.

Following his loan spells with Cheltenham Town, Hayles had a brief run in the Leicester first team upon his return, but failed to score a single goal. He nonetheless earned a medal on 24 April after the club finished the season as League One champions. Hayles was released at the end of his contract on 29 May.

=== Cheltenham Town ===
On 12 August 2008, Hayles joined Cheltenham Town on loan for a month, which was extended for a further month on 11 September. He re-joined Cheltenham on loan for another month on 27 November.

On 13 July 2009, Hayles joined Cheltenham full-time. After making more than 50 league appearances for the Robins, he was released along with seven other players in May 2010.

=== Truro City ===
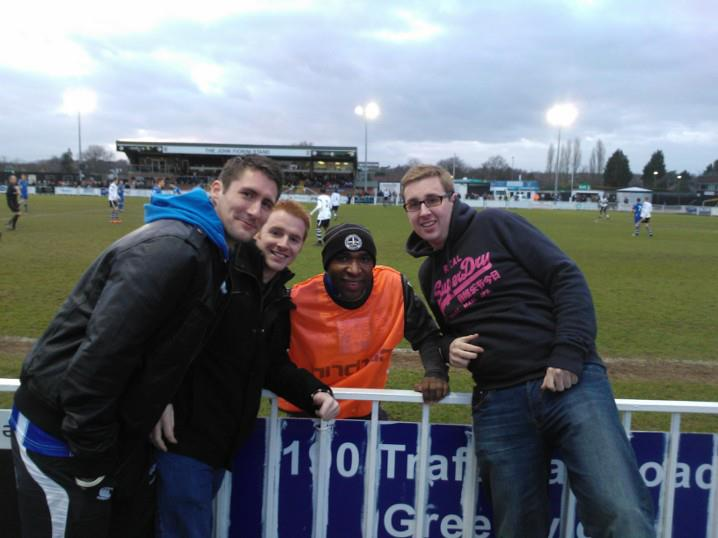
Hayles posing with Truro City fans in 2013

Hayles signed with Southern League Premier Division club Truro City on 18 September 2010. He made his debut three days later against Bideford in the Southern League Cup. He scored his first goal for the club on 9 October 2010 in a 6–0 win against Halesowen Town as City went joint top of the Premier Division table. Having scored two goals in his first month at Treyew Road, Hayles extended his stay for another month. "Barry has settled in fantastically well and has been a great boost for the squad and the club," said Lee Hodges, the manager of Truro City and a teammate of the striker during his time at Plymouth Argyle. "I am absolutely delighted that he is staying" Hodges added. Hayles scored a hat-trick in the top of the table clash between Salisbury City and Truro City on 22 February 2011 in a result that Truro City won 6–0, Salisbury's first home defeat of the 2010–11 Southern League Premier Division season.

=== St Albans City ===
Hayles agreed to join Southern League Premier Division side St Albans City at the start of the 2012–13 season, after leaving Truro City due to the club's financial problems.

=== Return to Truro City ===
On 14 December 2012, Hayles returned to Truro City on a non-contract basis, the same day that the club was sold to new owners.

=== Arlesey Town ===
On 24 July 2013, Hayles signed for Arlesey Town after he had scored twice in the first half of their 6–0 friendly win over Langford the previous evening.

=== Second return to Truro City ===
In August 2014, Hayles re-signed for Truro City and opened his scoring in his second game of the season, scoring both goals in the 2–1 win at Paulton Rovers. That season he helped them reach the Conference South via the play-offs and was again released at the age of 43.

=== Chesham United ===
On 26 June 2015, Chesham United announced they had signed Hayles as a player-coach. Chesham United manager Andy Lees stated, "He has a lot to offer on the pitch still and now off it as well as he looks to start a coaching career". In Chesham United's 1–0 win at Bristol Rovers in the FA Cup on 8 November 2015, Hayles came on as a substitute, receiving an ovation from both sets of supporters.

=== Windsor ===
Hayles joined Hellenic League Premier Division side Windsor for a similar role in July 2017.

=== Merstham ===
After two years with Windsor, Hayles joined Merstham as assistant manager ahead of the 2019–20 season. He was also registered as a player, and made his debut for the club as a second-half substitute in a 4–0 win at Wingate & Finchley.

Following Merstham's relegation from the Isthmian League Premier Division in 2022, Hayles, along with manager Frank Wilson, departed the club.

=== Return to Windsor ===
In July 2022, Hayles returned to Windsor as a member of new manager Mick Woodham's backroom staff, the club refusing to rule out the possibility of him playing for the club again. He made his second debut for the club on 16 August, playing 81 minutes in a 3–2 defeat at Harefield United.

After failing to find another club, Hayles retired from playing in 2023 at the age of 51.

== International career ==
Whilst at Stevenage Borough, Hayles played twice for the England non-League team. The first game was in May 1995 at Clarence Park, against the Scottish Highland Football League who beat the England non-League team 3–2. The second game was in May 1997 at Balmoral Stadium (three miles south of Aberdeen), again against the Scottish Highland Football League. This time, the England non-League team won 5–0, with Hayles scoring two goals, and Lee Hughes, then of Kidderminster Harriers, scoring another two goals.

Hayles was called up to the Cayman Islands squad in 2000 for a pair of FIFA World Cup qualifying matches against Cuba. He took part in an unofficial 5–0 friendly defeat to American club side D.C. United, but he never played for them in a full international after FIFA ruled that he did not meet eligibility requirements.

Hayles played at least ten times for Jamaica, making his debut against Cuba on 10 June 2001. Although he never announced his retirement from international football, the national team did not call him up after 2005.

In addition, he has made appearances for England's veterans national team.

== Career statistics ==
Appearances and goals by club, season and competition
Club	Season	League			FA Cup		League Cup		Other		Total	
Club	Season	Division	Apps	Goals	Apps	Goals	Apps	Goals	Apps	Goals	Apps	Goals
Willesden Hawkeye	1988–89		?		?		?		?		10	3
Willesden Hawkeye	1989–90	Middlesex County League Division 1	?		?		?		?		22	8
Willesden Hawkeye	1990–91	Middlesex County League Division 1	?		?		?		?		19	10
Willesden Hawkeye	1991–92	Spartan League Division 1	?		?		?		?		29	16
Willesden Hawkeye	1992–93	Spartan League Premier League	?		?		?		?		27	11
Willesden Hawkeye	1993–94	Spartan League Premier League	?		?		?		?		34	21
Willesden Hawkeye	Total		?		?		?		?		141	69
Stevenage Borough	1993–94	Isthmian League Premier Division	14	1	—		—		3 (Note: Two appearances one goal in Herts Charity Cup; one appearance in Herts Senior Cup)	1	17	2
Stevenage Borough	1994–95	Football Conference	35	13	2	1	—		8 (Note: Three appearances in FA Trophy; two appearances in Conference League Cup; one appearance in Isthmian League Charity Shield; one appearance one goal in Herts Charity Cup; one appearance in Herts Senior Cup)	1	45	15
Stevenage Borough	1995–96	Football Conference	38	29	6	0	—		5 (Note: Four appearances five goals in FA Trophy; one appearance in Herts Charity Cup)	5	49	34
Stevenage Borough	1996–97	Football Conference	30	17	5	3	—		8 (Note: Five appearances two goals in FA Trophy; one appearance in Conference League Cup; one appearance two goals in Herts Charity Cup; one appearance one goal in JC Thompson Championship Shield)	5	43	25
Stevenage Borough	Total		117	60	13	4	0	0	24	12	154	76
Bristol Rovers	1997–98	Second Division	45	23	5	2	2	0	5 (Note: Three appearances in Football League Trophy; two appearances one goal in Second Division play-offs)	1	57	26
Bristol Rovers	1998–99	Second Division	17	9	0	0	2	1	—		19	10
Bristol Rovers	Total		62	32	5	2	4	1	5	1	76	36
Fulham	1998–99	Second Division	30	8	4	1	—		0	0	34	9
Fulham	1999–2000	First Division	35	5	4	2	4	2	—		43	9
Fulham	2000–01	First Division	35	18	0	0	4	1	—		39	19
Fulham	2001–02	Premier League	35	8	5	2	3	2	—		43	12
Fulham	2002–03	Premier League	14	1	0	0	1	0	9 (Note: Six appearances one goal in UEFA Intertoto Cup; three appearances one goal in UEFA Cup)	2	24	3
Fulham	2003–04	Premier League	26	4	6	1	0	0	—		32	5
Fulham	Total		175	44	19	6	12	5	9	2	215	57
Sheffield United	2004–05	Championship	4	0	—		1	0	—		5	0
Millwall	2004–05	Championship	32	12	1	0	—		0	0	33	12
Millwall	2005–06	Championship	23	4	0	0	4	1	—		27	5
Millwall	Total		55	16	1	0	4	1	0	0	60	17
Plymouth Argyle	2006–07	Championship	39	13	3	1	0	0	—		42	14
Plymouth Argyle	2007–08	Championship	23	2	—		1	0	—		24	2
Plymouth Argyle	Total		62	15	3	1	1	0	0	0	66	16
Leicester City	2007–08	Championship	18	2	1	0	—		—		19	2
Leicester City	2008–09	League One	10	0	0	0	0	0	1 (Note: Appearance(s) in Football League Trophy)	0	11	0
Leicester City	Total		28	2	1	0	0	0	1	0	30	2
Cheltenham Town (loan)	2008–09	League One	12	4	1	0	0	0	0	0	13	4
Cheltenham Town	2009–10	League Two	39	7	1	0	1	0	1	0	42	7
Truro City	2010–11	Southern League Premier Division	46	20	0	0	—		0	0	46	20
Truro City	2011–12	Conference South	30	7	0	0	—		0	0	30	7
Truro City	Total		76	27	0	0	0	0	0	0	76	27
St. Albans City	2012–13	Southern League Premier Division	17	6	2	2	—		2 (Note: One appearance in FA Trophy; one appearance in Southern League Cup)	0	21	8
Truro City	2012–13	Conference South	23	6	0	0	—		—		23	6
Arlesey Town	2013–14	Southern League Premier Division	29	11	2	0	—		7 (Note: Four appearances four goals in FA Trophy; two appearances in Bedfordshire Senior Cup; one appearance in Southern League Cup)	4	38	15
Truro City	2014–15	Southern League Premier Division	32	6	1	0	—		8 (Note: Four appearances three goals in Southern League Cup; two appearances in FA Trophy; two appearances in Southern League Premier Division play-offs)	3	41	9
Chesham United	2015–16	Southern League Premier Division	31	4	4	1	—		8 (Note: Five appearances in FA Trophy; three appearances three goals in Berks & Bucks Senior Cup)	3	43	8
Chesham United	2016–17	Southern League Premier Division	23	6	5	1	—		2 (Note: One appearance in FA Trophy; one appearance in Berks & Bucks Senior Cup)	0	30	7
Chesham United	Total		54	10	9	2	0	0	10	3	73	15
Windsor	2017–18	Hellenic League Premier Division	30	11	1	0	—		14 (Note: Six appearances in FA Vase; four appearances one goal in Hellenic League Challenge Cup; three appearances one goal in Berks & Bucks Senior Cup; one appearance one goal in Hellenic League Floodlit Cup)	3	45	14
Windsor	2018–19	Hellenic League Premier Division	12	2	0	0	—		3 (Note: Two appearances in Hellenic League Challenge Cup; one appearance one goal in Hellenic League Floodlit Cup)	1	15	3
Windsor	Total		42	13	1	0	0	0	17	4	60	17
Merstham	2019–20	Isthmian League Premier Division	8	1	0	0	—		3 (Note: One appearance one goal in FA Trophy; one appearance in Alan Turvey Trophy; one appearance in Surrey Senior Cup)	1	11	2
Merstham	2020–21	Isthmian League Premier Division	3	0	0	0	—		1 (Note: Appearance(s) in FA Trophy)	0	4	0
Merstham	2021–22	Isthmian League Premier Division	4	0	0	0	—		1	0	5	0
Merstham	Total		15	1	0	0	0	0	5	1	20	2
Windsor	2022–23	Combined Counties League Premier Division North	12	1	0	0	—		2 (Note: One appearance in FA Vase; one appearance in Combined Counties League Premier Challenge Cup)	0	14	1
Career total			854+	261+	59+	17+	23+	7+	91+	30+	1,168	384

== Honours ==
Stevenage Borough

- Football Conference: 1995–96
- Isthmian League Premier Division: 1993–94

Fulham

- Football League First Division: 2000–01
- Football League Second Division: 1998–99
- UEFA Intertoto Cup: 2002

Truro City

- Southern League Premier Division: 2010–11
- Southern League Premier Division play-offs: 2015

== See also ==
- List of men's footballers with the most official appearances
