= 2000–01 Fulham F.C. season =

Fulham
2000–2001 season
- Manager: Jean Tigana
- Stadium: Craven Cottage
- First Division: 1st (promoted)
- FA Cup: Third round
- Football League Cup: Quarter-finals
- Top goalscorer: League: Louis Saha (27); All: Louis Saha (32)

The 2000–01 season was Fulham's 103rd season in professional football, competing in the Football League Division 1. This season for Fulham was of note, as they gained promotion to the Premier League and ran away with the Division 1 title with 101 points, with a 10-point margin over runners-up Blackburn Rovers. The manager was former Monaco manager Jean Tigana's first season at Craven Cottage after Paul Bracewell's sacking toward the end of the 1999–2000 season.

== Players ==
=== First-team squad ===
Note: Flags indicate national team as defined under FIFA eligibility rules; some limited exceptions apply. Players may hold more than one non-FIFA nationality.

No.	Pos.	Nation	Player
1	GK	NIR	Maik Taylor (Note: Taylor was born in Hildesheim, West Germany (now Germany), but qualified to represent any of the home nations internationally as he holds a British passport, and made his international debut for Northern Ireland in 1999.)
2	DF	IRL	Steve Finnan
3	DF	ENG	Rufus Brevett
4	DF	WAL	Andy Melville
5	DF	WAL	Chris Coleman
6	DF	WAL	Kit Symons (Note: Symons was born in Basingstoke, England, but also qualified to represent Wales internationally through his father and made his international debut for Wales in February 1992.)
7	MF	WAL	Paul Trollope (Note: Trollope was born in Swindon, England, but also qualified to represent Wales internationally and made his international debut for Wales in May 1997.)
8	MF	ENG	Lee Clark
9	MF	FRA	Nicolas Sahnoun (on loan from Bordeaux)
10	MF	SCO	John Collins
11	FW	DEN	Peter Møller (on loan from Real Oviedo)
12	GK	USA	Marcus Hahnemann
13	FW	GER	Karl-Heinz Riedle
14	DF	ENG	Simon Morgan
15	FW	JAM	Barry Hayles (Note: Hayles was born in Lambeth, England, but also qualified to represent Jamaica internationally and made his international debut for Jamaica in June 2001, having previously represented the Cayman Islands internationally despite being ineligible to do so.)
16	DF	WAL	Alan Neilson (Note: Neilson was born in Wegberg, West Germany (now Germany), but also qualified to represent Wales internationally and made his international debut for Wales in February 1992.)
17	MF	ENG	Wayne Collins

No.	Pos.	Nation	Player
18	DF	SCO	Kieran McAnespie (Note: McAnespie was born in Gosport, England, but also qualified to represent Scotland internationally, and represented them at U-21 level.)
19	MF	DEN	Bjarne Goldbæk
20	FW	FRA	Louis Saha
21	FW	CAN	Paul Peschisolido
22	FW	POR	Luís Boa Morte (on loan from Southampton)
23	MF	ENG	Sean Davis
24	DF	FRA	Alain Goma
26	FW	ENG	Kevin Betsy (Note: Betsy was born in Woking, England, but also qualified to represent Seychelles internationally and would make his international debut for Seychelles in 2011.)
27	DF	ENG	Zat Knight
28	FW	ENG	Luke Cornwall
29	DF	IRL	Terry Phelan (Note: Phelan was born in Manchester, England, but also qualified to represent the Republic of Ireland internationally and made his international debut for the Republic of Ireland in 1991.)
30	GK	ENG	Glyn Thompson
31	MF	USA	Eddie Lewis
33	FW	ENG	Calum Willock (Note: Willock was born in Lambeth, England, but also qualified to represent Saint Kitts and Nevis internationally and would make his international debut for Saint Kitts and Nevis in 2004.)
34	FW	GHA	Elvis Hammond
36	DF	ENG	Mark Hudson
40	FW	LAT	Andrejs Štolcers

=== Left club during season ===
Note: Flags indicate national team as defined under FIFA eligibility rules; some limited exceptions apply. Players may hold more than one non-FIFA nationality.

No.	Pos.	Nation	Player
11	MF	ENG	Steve Hayward (to Barnsley)
25	MF	FRA	Fabrice Fernandes (on loan from Rennes)

No.	Pos.	Nation	Player
32	MF	ENG	Sam Keevill (to Kilmarnock)
35	DF	NIR	Gary McCracken (to Cambridge United)

== Final league table ==
Pos	Team	Pld	W	D	L	GF	GA	GD	Pts	Qualification or relegation
1	Fulham (C, P)	46	30	11	5	90	32	+58	101	Promotion to the Premier League
2	Blackburn Rovers (P)	46	26	13	7	76	39	+37	91	Promotion to the Premier League
3	Bolton Wanderers (O, P)	46	24	15	7	76	45	+31	87	Qualification for the First Division play-offs
4	Preston North End	46	23	9	14	64	52	+12	78	Qualification for the First Division play-offs
5	Birmingham City	46	23	9	14	59	48	+11	78	Qualification for the First Division play-offs

Rules for classification: 1) Points; 2) Goal difference; 3) Goals scored
(C) Champions; (O) Play-off winners; (P) Promoted

== Matches ==
=== Pre-season friendlies ===
8 July 2000	Tiverton Town	0–2	Fulham	Ladysmead, Tiverton
		(Report)	Melville 41'; Peschisolido 45'	Attendance: unknown Referee: unknown

12 July 2000	Rennes	0–1	Fulham	Rennes
		(Report)	Hayles 36'	Stadium: Route de Lorient; Attendance: 7,000; Referee: unknown

19 July 2000	French XI	0–1	Fulham	INF Clairefontaine
		(Report)	Cornwall 63'	Attendance: unknown Referee: unknown

22 July 2000	Fulham	2–0	India	Fulham, London
	Riedle 40', 80'	Report)		Stadium: Craven Cottage; Attendance: 5,773; Referee: William Jordan

26 July 2000	Barnet	0–0	Fulham	Barnet
		(Report)		Stadium: Underhill; Attendance: unknown Referee: unknown

29 July 2000	Brentford	0–2	Fulham	Brentford, London
		(Report)	Boa Morte 6', 40'	Stadium: Griffin Park; Attendance: 2,704; Referee: unknown

2 August 2000	Fulham	0–0	Tottenham Hotspur	Fulham, London
		(Report)		Stadium: Craven Cottage; Attendance: 12,928; Referee: Graham Poll

5 August 2000	AFC Bournemouth	0–1	Fulham	Bournemouth
		(Report)	Symons 86'	Stadium: Dean Court; Attendance: unknown Referee: unknown

=== Results per matchday ===
Matchday	1	2	3	4	5	6	7	8	9	10	11	12	13	14	15	16	17	18	19	20	21	22	23	24	25	26	27	28	29	30	31	32	33	34	35	36	37	38	39	40	41	42	43	44	45	46
Ground	H	A	H	A	H	H	A	H	A	H	H	A	H	A	H	A	H	A	H	A	A	H	A	H	A	H	A	A	H	H	A	H	A	A	H	H	A	A	H	A	A	H	A	H	H	A
Result	W	W	W	W	W	W	W	W	W	W	W	D	L	D	W	W	W	D	W	D	W	W	W	W	L	W	W	W	L	D	D	W	L	W	D	W	W	W	D	W	W	D	D	W	D	L
Position	3	1	1	1	1	1	1	1	1	1	1	1	1	1	1	1	1	1	1	1	1	1	1	1	1	1	1	1	1	1	1	1	1	1	1	1	1	1	1	1	1	1	1	1	1	1

Source: WorldFootball.com
A = Away; H = Home; W = Win; D = Draw; L = Loss

12 August 2000 1	Fulham	2–0	Crewe Alexandra	Fulham, London
15:00	Hayles 64'; Saha 73'	(Report)		Stadium: Craven Cottage; Attendance: 11,157; Referee: Rob Styles

18 August 2000 2	Birmingham City	1–3	Fulham	Birmingham
19:45	Sonner 38'	(Report)	J. Collins 1'; Saha 31'; Davis 45'	Stadium: St Andrew's; Attendance: 21,659; Referee: Neale Barry

26 August 2000 3	Fulham	4–1	Stockport County	Fulham, London
15:00	Hayles 3', 76'; Collins 59'; Boa Morte 87'	(Report)	Cooper 5'	Stadium: Craven Cottage; Attendance: 11,009; Referee: Paul Alcock

28 August 2000 4	Norwich City	0–1	Fulham	Norwich
19:45		(Report)	Boa Morte 88'	Stadium: Carrow Road; Attendance: 16,678; Referee: Mike Fletcher

10 September 2000 5	Fulham	5–1	Barnsley	Fulham, London
13:00	Saha 6', 31', 45' (pen.); Hayles 60'; Boa Morte 90'	(Report)	Appleby 73'	Stadium: Craven Cottage; Attendance: 10,437; Referee: Andy Hall

12 September 2000 6	Fulham	3–1	Burnley	Fulham, London
19:45	Goldbaek 53'; Saha 64', 81'	(Report)	Cook 10'	Stadium: Craven Cottage; Attendance: 11,863; Referee: Trevor Parkes

16 September 2000 7	Nottingham Forest	0–3	Fulham	Nottingham
15:00		(Report)	Saha 58'; Fernandes 82'; Hayles 83'	Stadium: City Ground; Attendance: 18,737; Referee: Eddie Wolstenholme

23 September 2000 8	Fulham	3–0	Gillingham	Fulham, London
15:00	Hayles 45', 87'; Clark 65'	(Report)		Stadium: Craven Cottage; Attendance: 13,032; Referee: Frazer Stretton

30 September 2000 9	Bolton Wanderers	0–2	Fulham	Bolton
15:00		(Report)	Boa Morte 1', 85'	Stadium: Reebok Stadium; Attendance: 19,924; Referee: Anthony Bates

15 October 2000 10	Fulham	2–1	Blackburn Rovers	Fulham, London
13:00	Fernandes 15'; Saha 68' (pen.)	(Report)	Jansen 4'	Stadium: Craven Cottage; Attendance: 15,427; Referee: Uriah Rennie

18 October 2000 11	Fulham	3–1	Crystal Palace	Fulham, London
19:45	Saha 10'; Clark 23', 59'	(Report)	Ruddock 17'	Stadium: Craven Cottage; Attendance: 16,040; Referee: Phil Richards

21 October 2000 12	Wolverhampton Wanderers	0–0	Fulham	Wolverhampton
15:00		(Report)		Stadium: Molineux; Attendance: 21,080; Referee: Graham Laws

24 October 2000 13	Fulham	0–1	Preston North End	Fulham, London
19:45		(Report)	Appleton 68'	Stadium: Craven Cottage; Attendance: 14,354; Referee: Paul Danson

28 October 2000 14	Sheffield Wednesday	3–3	Fulham	Sheffield
15:00	Sibon 41'; Morrison 72'; Westwood 90'	(Report)	Saha 47'; Hayles 55'; Melville 82'	Stadium: Hillsborough; Attendance: 17,559; Referee: Graham Laws

4 November 2000 15	Fulham	3–0	Huddersfield Town	Fulham, London
15:00	Saha 58'; Goldbæk 89'; Finnan 90'	(Report)		Stadium: Craven Cottage; Attendance: 13,108; Referee: Steve Bennett

11 November 2000 16	Wimbledon	0–3	Fulham	Selhurst, London
15:00		(Report)	Saha 32', 59' (pen.); Hayles 86'	Stadium: Selhurst Park; Attendance: 14,071; Referee: Chris Foy

18 November 2000 17	Fulham	3–1	Portsmouth	Fulham, London
15:00	Hayles 11', 69'; Clark 80'	(Report)	Claridge 44'	Stadium: Craven Cottage; Attendance: 19,005; Referee: Keith Hill

21 November 2000 18	Sheffield United	1–1	Fulham	Sheffield
19:45	D'Jaffo 8'	(Report)	Finnan 4'	Stadium: Bramall Lane; Attendance: 16,041; Referee: Paul Rejer

25 November 2000 19	Fulham	2–1	Grimsby Town	Fulham, London
15:00	Boa Morte 60'; Saha 81'	(Report)	Donovan 87'	Stadium: Craven Cottage; Attendance: 12,107; Referee: Paul Durkin

2 December 2000 20	Preston North End	1–1	Fulham	Preston
15:00	Jackson 4'	(Report)	Davis 60'	Stadium: Deepdale; Attendance: 16,047; Referee: Alan Wiley

9 December 2000 21	West Bromwich Albion	1–3	Fulham	West Bromwich
15:00	Lyttle 71'	(Report)	Davis 4', 28'; Štolcers 87'	Stadium: The Hawthorns; Attendance: 22,301; Referee: Rob Harris

16 December 2000 22	Fulham	3–1	Tranmere Rovers	Fulham, London
15:00	Clark 21'; Boa Morte 28', 50'	(Report)	Koumas 7'	Stadium: Craven Cottage; Attendance: 13,157; Referee: Roy Pearson

23 December 2000 23	Crewe Alexandra	1–2	Fulham	Crewe
15:00	Rivers 19'	(Report)	Boa Morte 46'; Hayles 75'	Stadium: Gresty Road; Attendance: 6,935; Referee: Anthony Leake

26 December 2000 24	Fulham	5–0	Watford	Fulham, London
19:45	Saha 29'; Hayles 42', 56', 75'; Štolcers 77'	(Report)		Stadium: Craven Cottage; Attendance: 19,373; Referee: Roy Pearson

1 January 2001 25	Stockport County	2–0	Fulham	Stockport
19:45	Wiss 40'; Clark 47'	(Report)		Stadium: Edgeley Park; Attendance: 6,100; Referee: Alan Butler

13 January 2001 26	Fulham	2–0	Norwich City	Fulham, London
15:00	Saha 39'; Boa Morte 90'	(Report)		Stadium: Craven Cottage; Attendance: 16,052; Referee: William Jordan

20 January 2001 27	Watford	1–3	Fulham	Watford
12:00	Helguson 79'	(Report)	Boa Morte 60', 68'; Saha 82'	Stadium: Vicarage Road; Attendance: 18,333; Referee: David Pugh

27 January 2001 28	Fulham	0–1	Birmingham City	Fulham, London
15:00		(Report)	Grainger 49'	Stadium: Craven Cottage; Attendance: 17,077; Referee: Scott Mathieson

31 January 2001 29	Queens Park Rangers	0–2	Fulham	Shepherd's Bush, London
20:00		(Report)	Møller 45'; Riedle 82'	Stadium: Loftus Road; Attendance: 16,403; Referee: Phil Dowd

4 February 2001 30	Fulham	1–1	Sheffield United	Fulham, London
13:00	Boa Morte 17'	(Report)	D'Jaffo 41'	Stadium: Craven Cottage; Attendance: 12,480; Referee: Graham Frankland

10 February 2001 31	Barnsley	0–0	Fulham	Barnsley
15:00		(Report)		Stadium: Oakwell; Attendance: 14,654; Referee: Paul Robinson

17 February 2001 32	Fulham	1–0	Nottingham Forest	Fulham, London
15:00	Saha 20'	(Report)		Stadium: Craven Cottage; Attendance: 17,425; Referee: Tony Leake

20 February 2001 33	Burnley	2–1	Fulham	Burnley
19:45	Thomas-Moore 73'; Little 88'	(Report)	Hayles 49'	Stadium: Turf Moor; Attendance: 15,737; Referee: Steve Lodge

24 February 2001 34	Gillingham	0–2	Fulham	Gillingham
15:00		(Report)	Collins 74'; Boa Morte 88'	Stadium: Priestfield Stadium; Attendance: 9,931; Referee: Steve Baines

4 March 2001 35	Fulham	1–1	Bolton Wanderers	Fulham, London
13:00	Hayles 42'	(Report)	Frandsen 51'	Stadium: Craven Cottage; Attendance: 16,468; Referee: David Laws

10 March 2001 36	Fulham	2–0	Queens Park Rangers	Fulham, London
15:00	Saha 37' (pen.); Clark 90'	(Report)		Stadium: Craven Cottage; Attendance: 16,021; Referee: Mike Riley

17 March 2001 37	Crystal Palace	0–2	Fulham	Selhurst, London
15:00		(Report)	Boa Morte 15', 69'	Stadium: Selhurst Park; Attendance: 21,133; Referee: Dermot Gallagher

30 March 2001 38	Tranmere Rovers	1–4	Fulham	Birkenhead
19:45	Osborn 90'	(Report)	Saha 3', 84'; Hayles 29'; Clark 65'	Stadium: Prenton Park; Attendance: 12,362; Referee: Roger Furnandiz

7 April 2001 39	Fulham	0–0	West Bromwich Albion	Fulham, London
15:00		(Report)		Stadium: Craven Cottage; Attendance: 17,795; Referee: Matt Messias

11 April 2001 40	Blackburn Rovers	1–2	Fulham	Blackburn
19:45	Jansen 6'	(Report)	Saha 45'; Davis 90'	Stadium: Ewood Park; Attendance: 21,578; Referee: Clive Wilkes

14 April 2001 41	Huddersfield Town	1–2	Fulham	Huddersfield
15:00	Facey 78'	(Report)	Saha 66' (pen.); Boa Morte 85'	Stadium: Kirklees Stadium; Attendance: 15,882; Referee: Keith Hill

16 April 2001 42	Fulham	1–1	Sheffield Wednesday	Fulham, London
15:00	Davis 90'	(Report)	Sibon 45'	Stadium: Craven Cottage; Attendance: 17,341; Referee: Eddie Wolstenhome

21 April 2001 43	Portsmouth	1–1	Fulham	Portsmouth
15:00	Bradbury 10'	(Report)	Saha 79' (pen.)	Stadium: Fratton Park; Attendance: 17,651; Referee: Phil Dowd

24 April 2001 44	Fulham	2–0	Wolverhampton Wanderers	Fulham, London
19:45	Saha 23' (pen.), 70' (pen.)	(Report)		Stadium: Craven Cottage; Attendance: 15,375; Referee: Tony Leake

28 April 2001 45	Fulham	1–1	Wimbledon	Fulham, London
15:00	Boa Morte 87' (pen.)	(Report)	Euell 74' (pen.)	Stadium: Craven Cottage; Attendance: 18,576; Referee: Tony Bates

6 May 2001 46	Grimsby Town	1–0	Fulham	Grimsby
13:30	Groves 27'	(Report)		Stadium: Blundell Park; Attendance: 8,706; Referee: Paul Rejer

=== League Cup ===
22 August 2000 First round, First leg	Northampton Town	1–0	Fulham	Northampton
19:45	Gabbiadini 24'	(Report)		Stadium: Sixfields Stadium; Attendance: 3,847; Referee: Phil Richards

5 September 2000 First round, Second leg	Fulham	4–1 (4–2 agg.)	Northampton Town	Fulham, London
19:45	Davis 45'; Fernandes 56'; Saha 71', 90'	(Report)	Sampson 6'	Stadium: Craven Cottage; Attendance: 5,302; Referee: Ray Oliver

19 September 2000 Second round, First leg	Chesterfield	1–0	Fulham	Saltergate, Chesterfield
19:45	Parrish 90'	(Report)		Attendance: 3,710; Referee: Scott Mathieson

27 September 2000 Second round, Second leg	Fulham	4–0 (4–1 agg.)	Chesterfield	Fulham, London
19:45	Hayward 35'; Symons 73'; Hayles 80'; Boa Morte 90'	(Report)		Stadium: Craven Cottage; Attendance: 4,800; Referee: Barry Knight

1 November 2000 Third round	Fulham	3–2	Wolverhampton Wanderers	Fulham, London
19:45	Boa Morte 67', 83'; Saha 85'	(Report)	Ketsbaia 60'; Osborn 90'	Stadium: Craven Cottage; Attendance: 6,763; Referee: Eddie Wolstenholme

29 November 2000 Fourth round	Fulham	3–2	Derby County	Fulham, London
19:45	Saha 28', 90'; Lewis 39'		Christie 13'; Powell 45'	Stadium: Craven Cottage; Attendance: 11,761; Referee: Peter Jones

13 December 2000 Quarter-final	Liverpool	3–0 (a.e.t.)	Fulham	Liverpool
20:00	Owen 105'; Šmicer 114'; Barmby 120'			Stadium: Anfield; Attendance: 20,144; Referee: Dermot Gallagher

=== FA Cup ===
7 January 2001 Third round	Fulham	1–2	Manchester United	Fulham, London
13:00	Fernandes 24'	(Report)	Solskjær 8'; Sheringham 89'	Stadium: Craven Cottage; Attendance: 19,178; Referee: Jeff Winter
