= Wayne Purser =

English footballer

Personal information
- Full name: Wayne Montague Purser
- Date of birth: 13 April 1980 (age 46)
- Place of birth: Basildon, England
- Height: 5 ft 9 in (1.75 m)
- Position: Striker

Youth career
- –1997: Queens Park Rangers

Senior career*
Years	Team	Apps	(Gls)
1997–2000	Queens Park Rangers	0	(0)
2000–2003	Barnet	73	(14)
2003–2004	Leyton Orient	49	(9)
2004	Hornchurch	14	(11)
2004–2005	Peterborough United	26	(6)
2005–2007	Weymouth	23	(6)
2006	→ Eastleigh (loan)	5	(2)
2007	Cambridge United	10	(0)
2007–2008	East Thurrock United		
2008-2009	Wivenhoe Town	1	(0)
- * Club domestic league appearances and goals

Wayne Montague Purser (born 13 April 1980) is an English football striker, most recently at Wivenhoe Town, then in the Isthmian League.

He began his career at Queens Park Rangers but failed to make an appearance for the club. He joined Barnet following his release in the summer of 2000, where he recorded one of the FA Cup's fastest ever hat-tricks against Havant & Waterlooville in a Fourth Qualifying Round Replay in 2001. The hat-trick was timed at just four minutes which saw the Bees through to the First round Proper. He then signed for Leyton Orient for £9,000 in March 2003, scoring a hat-trick on his debut. In August 2004 he joined ambitious Hornchurch for £15,000, but the club quickly ran into financial difficulties and, following 11 goals in 14 league games, he joined League One side Peterborough United on a free transfer. At the end of the season, however, new manager Mark Wright told Purser to find a new club. He rejoined Hill at Weymouth, but missed the majority of his first season with an eye injury. He joined Eastleigh on-loan for a month in September 2006 to regain match fitness, but he was released from his contract at Weymouth in January 2007 by mutual consent. He joined Cambridge later that day, but was released at the end of the season. He spent several months at East Thurrock United before signing for Wivenhoe Town for the remainder of the season, although he only made one appearance there.
