= Lee Clark (footballer) =

English football manager and former footballer

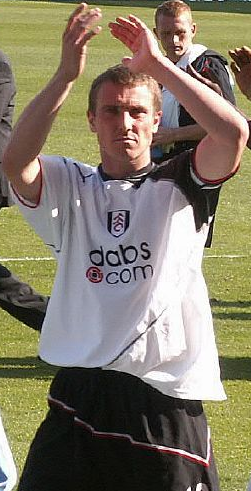
- Clark playing for Fulham in 2005

Personal information
- Full name: Lee Robert Clark
- Date of birth: 27 October 1972 (age 54)
- Place of birth: Wallsend, England
- Position: Midfielder

Youth career
- 1987–1990: Newcastle United

Senior career*
| Years | Team | Apps | (Gls) |
| 1990–1997 | Newcastle United | 195 | (23) |
| 1997–1999 | Sunderland | 74 | (16) |
| 1999–2005 | Fulham | 149 | (20) |
| 2005–2006 | Newcastle United | 22 | (1) |
| Total | | 440 | (60) |

International career
| 1992–1993 | England U21 | 11 | (0) |

Managerial career
- 2008–2012: Huddersfield Town
- 2012–2014: Birmingham City
- 2014–2015: Blackpool
- 2016–2017: Kilmarnock
- 2017: Bury
- 2019–2020: Blyth Spartans
- 2021: Al-Merrikh
- 2021–2022: Al-Ittihad
- 2022: Al-Merrikh
- 2026: Rotherham United
- 2026: Hartlepool United
- * Club domestic league appearances and goals

Lee Robert Clark (born 27 October 1972) is an English football manager and former professional player.

As a player, he was a midfielder and played in the Premier League for Newcastle United, Sunderland and Fulham, with whom he won promotion to the top flight, winning the Football League First Division title in 1993, 1999 and 2001. He was also part of the Magpies squad under Kevin Keegan that finished runners-up in the top flight in consecutive seasons. He was capped 11 times by the England under-21 team and was called up to the full England squad for the World Cup warm up tournament the 1997 Tournoi de France, but he was only named a substitute and never went on to earn a full international cap.

Following his retirement from playing in 2006, he later returned to Newcastle as reserve team manager, before becoming a first team coach at Norwich City. He later became first team manager at Huddersfield Town and had similar spells in charge of Birmingham City, Blackpool, Kilmarnock, Bury and Blyth Spartans. In 2020 he joined non-League side Newcastle Blue Star as director of football, before moving to Sudan to manage Al-Merrikh. In 2026 he briefly joined Rotherham United before moving to Hartlepool United.

== Club career ==
=== Newcastle United ===
Born in Wallsend, North Tyneside, Clark started his career at the club he supported as a boy, Newcastle United coming up through the youth system at the club. In 1993, he was part of the Newcastle side promoted to the Premier League as champions and then helped them finish as runners-up in both 1995–96 and 1996–97. In 1995–96, Newcastle United were pipped to the title by Manchester United. After a game where Newcastle United drew 3–3 away at Manchester City, Newcastle United purchased defensive midfielder David Batty to shore up the team defensively and Clark, more of an attacking midfielder, lost his place in the side. Clark reasons that this was a mistake that hurt the team dynamic that was working, and that this decision may have cost Newcastle United the title. To back up his claim, Clark cited and compared the form of Newcastle United from January 1996 until he was dropped for defensive midfielder Batty; against the form of Newcastle United in the remaining 11 games when Clark was absent. Clark made nearly 200 appearances scoring 23 goals for Newcastle in his first spell at the club.

=== Sunderland ===
Clark moved to Newcastle's local rivals, First Division club Sunderland, in 1997, and was part of the side promoted to the Premier League in 1999 as champions with a (then) professional league record of 105 points. A year earlier, he had been a key player in the side that reached the First Division play-off final, only to suffer a penalty shoot-out defeat to Charlton Athletic after a 4–4 draw at Wembley.

However, at the 1999 FA Cup final he was spotted with the Newcastle fans wearing a T-shirt with the slogan "Sad Mackem Bastards". He was immediately dropped from the team, and never played for Sunderland again.

=== Fulham ===
Clark moved to Fulham in 1999. He collected another Division One title medal with in 2001, enabling him to experience Premier League football for the first time since the 1996–97 season. In 2004, he helped Fulham secure what was, at the time, their highest final position – ninth in the top flight. During that season he opened the scoring as Fulham beat Manchester United 3–1 at Old Trafford in October 2003. Clark left Fulham in 2005 to return to former club Newcastle United, after making 149 league appearances and scoring 20 goals for the West London club.

=== Return to Newcastle ===
Clark was allowed to leave Fulham after his contract expired in the summer of 2005 despite being club captain during the 2004–05 season. At the time of his departure, he was Fulham's longest-serving player. He subsequently returned to Newcastle, coaching and playing on a month-by-month contract.

Clark scored one goal for Newcastle in the 2005–06 season, an equaliser in a 2–2 draw with Middlesbrough. He played his final professional game on 7 May 2006, coming on as a substitute at home to Chelsea. In total he played 265 times for Newcastle, scoring 28 goals.

== International career ==
Clark scored a hat-trick for England schoolboys at Wembley Stadium in 1988 in a 4–1 win for England.

He represented England at international level playing for the England under-21s, making 11 appearances between 1992 and 1993 during his time playing for Newcastle.

In 1997, he was a member of England's squad for Le Tournoi de France but did not play.

== Coaching career ==
On 1 June 2006, the newly appointed Newcastle manager Glenn Roeder installed Clark as a first team coach and reserve team manager following Tommy Craig's departure while Clark was still playing for Newcastle. He remained as first team coach and as reserve team manager after retiring in 2007 until Roeder parted company with the club and Clark followed shortly afterwards in November.

In November 2007, Clark left his post at Newcastle to become assistant manager to Roeder at Championship club Norwich City.

Clark joined Newcastle Blue Star in July 2020 as director of football to temporarily oversee the youth section of the football club.

== Managerial career ==
=== Huddersfield Town ===
After League One club Huddersfield Town had dismissed manager Stan Ternent on 4 November 2008, The Terriers were reported to be interested in then Norwich assistant manager Clark. On 12 December 2008, Clark was officially unveiled as the new manager of Huddersfield, signing a three-and-a-half-year contract. Clark replaced Gerry Murphy, who had been caretaker manager for the League One side following the departure of Ternent. The first move made by Clark was to appoint Terry McDermott as his assistant as well as bringing in Derek Fazackerley in as first team coach and Steve Black as performance coach, all of whom had previously worked with Newcastle United. Clark officially took over on 15 December; his first game in charge of the club was a 2–0 win over Hereford United on 20 December.

In his first season at the club he helped them to a ninth-placed finish in League One. They also only lost two home league games under Clark in the 2008–09 season.

In his second season in charge, Clark helped Huddersfield to secure a play-off spot and became the first manager to win three Manager of the Month awards in a single season since Roberto Martínez in 2007–08. Huddersfield were defeated by Millwall in the 2009–10 play-off semi-final.

In the 2010–11 season, Clark guided Huddersfield to a third-placed finish in the league, earning them a place in the play-offs after a club-record 25-game unbeaten run in the league. They reached the final after beating AFC Bournemouth 4–2 on penalties, but lost 3–0 to Peterborough United in the Old Trafford final. In July 2011, he agreed a new rolling contract with the club.

Clark continued breaking records at the beginning of the 2011–12 season, extending the unbeaten run in domestic regular-season league games to a Football League record 43 games.

Clark was dismissed as manager of Huddersfield on 15 February 2012 following a 1–0 home defeat to Sheffield United.

=== Birmingham City ===
On 26 June 2012, Clark was confirmed as manager of Birmingham City, with Terry McDermott as his Assistant Manager and Derek Fazackerley and Steve Watson as his First Team Coaches. John Vaughan was brought in as his Goalkeeping Coach and Malcolm Crosby was appointed Chief Scout. Clark signed Peter Løvenkrands, David Lucas, Hayden Mullins and Darren Ambrose in the summer of 2012, as well as Ravel Morrison, Ben Gordon, James Hurst, Leroy Lita, Paul Caddis, Paul Robinson, Rob Hall, Shane Ferguson and Wes Thomas later on throughout the 2012–13 season.

Clark endured a difficult start to his managerial reign, with a draw and two losses in his first three games in the Championship. His first win came against Peterborough but Birmingham suffered a 5–0 home defeat against Barnsley in September. During the January 2013 transfer window, Clark sold Jake Jervis, David Lucas and Jack Butland, who returned on loan for the remainder of the season. Clark struggled to get Birmingham out of the bottom half of the league until back to back wins against Derby County and Middlesbrough took them up to 12th place in March. Despite receiving criticism from fans for alleged poor management skills regarding public fallouts with Nikola Žigić, Clark has been praised for introducing academy players into the first team squad, players including Jack Butland, Will Packwood, Mitch Hancox, Callum Reilly, Koby Arthur and Reece Hales. Clark continued the start of 2013 with his team producing good form, including a 4–0 away win at Crystal Palace and back to back 1–0 wins against Bristol City and Leeds. After finishing the season in 12th place, 7 points off the play-offs, Clark made his first signings for the 2013–14 Championship season with Darren Randolph, Andrew Shinnie and Lee Novak all signing on free transfers, whilst Olly Lee's loan was made permanent. The 2013–14 season started poorly again for Clark, with Birmingham winning a single game in the league against Yeovil Town as the Blues made their worst start to a league season for 25 years. Despite poor results in the league (including an 18 home match run without a league win) and the removal from the coaching staff of Clark's right-hand men Derek Fazackerley and Terry McDermott, Clark managed to keep Birmingham City in the Championship with an injury time equaliser from Paul Caddis in the final game of the 2013–14 season against Bolton, the 2–2 result being enough to keep the team up on goal difference.

On 20 October 2014, with Birmingham 21st in the table and having won at home in the league only once in more than a year, Clark and assistant Steve Watson were dismissed. At the time of his dismissal, Clark had won 33 of his 116 games – the lowest win ratio for a quarter of a century from a Birmingham manager – and left the club one point above the relegation zone.

=== Blackpool ===
On 30 October 2014, Clark was appointed manager of Blackpool on a one-year rolling deal. Having been bottom of the Championship since October 2014 and having won only four games all season, Blackpool were relegated to League One on 6 April 2015 with six games left to play. On 9 May 2015, Clark resigned as manager of Blackpool following their relegation from the Championship. Blackpool won only three games from 33 played under Clark's tenure.

=== Kilmarnock ===
Clark was appointed manager of Scottish Premiership club Kilmarnock on 15 February 2016 while they were in the relegation zone. He went on to help Kilmarnock keep their 23-year long Scottish Premiership status by defeating Falkirk 4–1 in the play off final with the latter of the two legs being a 4–0 thrashing with goals from Greg Kiltie (2), Miles Addison and Kris Boyd. He left the club in February 2017, exactly a year after joining and with the club in the top six.

=== Bury ===
Clark was appointed manager of League One club Bury on 15 February 2017. With the club in the relegation zone, he was tasked with keeping them in the league and succeeded in doing so. After eight months in charge of Bury, Clark was sacked on 30 October 2017. Four consecutive losses before his dismissal saw Bury second from bottom in League One, at the conclusion of October 2017.

=== Blyth Spartans ===
On 1 June 2019, National League North club Blyth Spartans unveiled Clark as their new manager. He left by mutual consent on 4 March 2020.

=== Al-Merrikh ===
On 7 March 2021, Clark was appointed as the new manager of Sudanese club Al-Merrikh and described the opportunity as an 'exciting' and 'different' experience. He took charge of his first game - a 2–1 win over Hilal Al-Fasher in the Sudan Premier League on 9 March 2021.

Clark's first experience of the CAF Champions League was a 3–0 away defeat to Simba of Tanzania on 16 March 2021 after which he blamed the loss on 'sabotage'.

On 19 June 2021, Al-Merrikh announced Clark had resigned as manager.

=== Al-Ittihad ===
In November 2021, Clark was appointed manager of Al-Ittihad of the Oman Professional League and drew 0–0 with Al-Nahda during his first game in charge.

=== Return to Al-Merrikh ===
On 29 January 2022, Al-Merrikh announced the return of Clark as their manager.

However, Clark was sacked just 51 days later following a 3–1 defeat to Al Ahly in the CAF Champions League.

=== Rotherham United ===
On 18 March 2026, Clark was appointed manager of Rotherham United until the end of the 2025–26 season. Rotherham were relegated to League Two with Clark winning one of his nine matches. On 2 May 2026, after the away defeat to Wycombe Wanderers, Clark announced that he had failed to agree a new deal with the club and had left the club.

=== Hartlepool United ===
On 14 May 2026, he was appointed as head coach of National League club Hartlepool United. Speaking following his appointment, Clark said "We're all going to try our utmost to get this club back into the Football League, without putting any timescales on it, that's the goal... I just felt this was an opportunity, even though I'm coming down a level, that I couldn't turn down because of what the outcome can be if we get it right." They won the opening match of the 2026–27 season, defeating Barrow 2–0 at Victoria Park. Clark resigned from his position following a 3–1 home defeat to Worthing on 19 September 2026. It was Hartlepool's sixth defeat in seven league games and left the club in 19th place in the table.

== Personal life ==
Clark's son, Bobby, plays as a midfielder for Derby County. His brother-in-law is Paul Baker, a former professional footballer. Clark is a Newcastle United supporter.

In 2025, Clark was declared bankrupt over an unpaid business loan.

== Career statistics ==
Appearances and goals by club, season and competition
| Club | Season | League | | | FA Cup | | League Cup | | Other | | Total | |
| Club | Season | Division | Apps | Goals | Apps | Goals | Apps | Goals | Apps | Goals | Apps | Goals |
|---|---|---|---|---|---|---|---|---|---|---|---|---|
| Newcastle United | 1990–91 | Second Division | 19 | 2 | 0 | 0 | 0 | 0 | 0 | 0 | 19 | 2 |
| Newcastle United | 1991–92 | Second Division | 29 | 5 | 2 | 0 | 3 | 0 | 1 (Note: Appearance in Full Members' Cup) | 1 | 35 | 6 |
| Newcastle United | 1992–93 | First Division | 46 | 9 | 4 | 1 | 5 | 0 | 3 (Note: Appearances in Anglo-Italian Cup) | 0 | 58 | 10 |
| Newcastle United | 1993–94 | Premier League | 29 | 2 | 3 | 0 | 2 | 0 | — | | 34 | 2 |
| Newcastle United | 1994–95 | Premier League | 19 | 1 | 2 | 1 | 3 | 0 | 3 (Note: Appearances in UEFA Cup) | 0 | 27 | 2 |
| Newcastle United | 1995–96 | Premier League | 28 | 2 | 2 | 0 | 3 | 0 | — | | 33 | 2 |
| Newcastle United | 1996–97 | Premier League | 25 | 2 | 3 | 1 | 1 | 0 | 5 | 0 | 34 | 3 |
| Newcastle United | Total | | 195 | 23 | 16 | 3 | 17 | 0 | 12 | 1 | 240 | 27 |
| Sunderland | 1997–98 | First Division | 46 | 13 | 2 | 0 | 1 | 0 | 3 (Note: Appearances in Football League play-offs) | 0 | 52 | 13 |
| Sunderland | 1998–99 | First Division | 27 | 3 | 2 | 0 | 4 | 0 | — | | 33 | 3 |
| Sunderland | Total | | 73 | 16 | 4 | 0 | 5 | 0 | 3 | 0 | 85 | 16 |
| Fulham | 1999–2000 | First Division | 42 | 8 | 4 | 0 | 6 | 1 | — | | 52 | 9 |
| Fulham | 2000–01 | First Division | 45 | 7 | 1 | 0 | 4 | 0 | — | | 50 | 7 |
| Fulham | 2001–02 | Premier League | 9 | 0 | 0 | 0 | 3 | 0 | — | | 12 | 0 |
| Fulham | 2002–03 | Premier League | 11 | 2 | 0 | 0 | 2 | 1 | 2 | 0 | 15 | 3 |
| Fulham | 2003–04 | Premier League | 25 | 2 | 2 | 0 | 0 | 0 | — | | 27 | 2 |
| Fulham | 2004–05 | Premier League | 17 | 1 | 5 | 0 | 0 | 0 | — | | 22 | 1 |
| Fulham | Total | | 149 | 20 | 12 | 0 | 15 | 2 | 2 | 0 | 178 | 22 |
| Newcastle United | 2005–06 | Premier League | 22 | 1 | 2 | 0 | 1 | 0 | 0 | 0 | 25 | 1 |
| Career total | | | 439 | 60 | 34 | 3 | 38 | 2 | 17 | 1 | 528 | 66 |

== Managerial statistics ==
As of 19 September 2026

Managerial record by team and tenure
| Team | From | To | Record | | | | | Ref |
| Team | From | To | P | W | D | L | Win % | Ref |
|---|---|---|---|---|---|---|---|---|
| Huddersfield Town | 15 December 2008 | 15 February 2012 | 177 | 86 | 51 | 40 | 48.6 | |
| Birmingham City | 26 June 2012 | 20 October 2014 | 116 | 33 | 35 | 48 | 28.4 | |
| Blackpool | 30 October 2014 | 9 May 2015 | 33 | 3 | 11 | 19 | 9.1 | |
| Kilmarnock | 15 February 2016 | 15 February 2017 | 44 | 10 | 14 | 20 | 22.7 | |
| Bury | 15 February 2017 | 30 October 2017 | 33 | 9 | 7 | 17 | 27.3 | |
| Blyth Spartans | 1 June 2019 | 4 March 2020 | 35 | 7 | 6 | 22 | 20.0 | |
| Al-Merrikh | 8 March 2021 | 19 June 2021 | 8 | 4 | 2 | 2 | 50.00 | |
| Al-Ittihad | 14 November 2021 | 28 January 2022 | 7 | 1 | 2 | 4 | 14.29 | |
| Al-Merrikh | 29 January 2022 | 21 March 2022 | 6 | 3 | 1 | 2 | 50.00 | |
| Rotherham United | 18 March 2026 | 2 May 2026 | 9 | 1 | 2 | 6 | 11.11 | |
| Hartlepool United | 14 May 2026 | 19 September 2026 | 9 | 3 | 0 | 6 | 33.33 | |
| Total | | | 478 | 160 | 131 | 187 | 33.5 | |

== Honours ==
=== Player ===
Newcastle United

- Football League First Division: 1992–93

Sunderland

- Football League First Division: 1998–99

Fulham

- Football League First Division: 2000–01

England

- Tournoi de France: 1997

Individual

- PFA Team of the Year: 1992–93 First Division, 1997–98 First Division, 1998–99 First Division, 2000–01 First Division
- Newcastle United Player of the Year: 1992–93

=== Manager ===
Kilmarnock

- Scottish Premiership play-offs: 2016

Individual

- Football League One Manager of the Month: November 2009, February 2010, April 2010, October 2011
