= List of Fulham F.C. records and statistics =

The following article features the records and statistics of Fulham Football Club, based in Fulham, West London.

== Player appearances ==
There are five Fulham players who have played more than 450 games for the club, all of whom have since retired from football:

- Johnny Haynes – 658
- Eddie Lowe – 511
- Les Barrett – 491
- Frank Penn – 459
- George Cohen – 459

=== Current ===
The players with the most appearances across all competitions who are still at the club as of 23 January 2026 (Note: Squad and appearance numbers per team Wikipedia page which in turn cites Soccerbase.) are:

- Tom Cairney – 371
- Harrison Reed – 204
- Antonee Robinson – 201
- Harry Wilson – 170 (Note: Including one season on loan.)
- Ryan Sessegnon – 160 (Note: Across two spells.)

== Goalscorers ==
Eight players have scored 100 or more goals for the club:

- Gordon Davies – 178
- Johnny Haynes – 158
- Bedford Jezzard – 154
- Jim Hammond – 150
- Graham Leggat – 134
- Arthur Stevens – 124
- Aleksandar Mitrović – 111
- Steve Earle – 108

=== Current ===
The three most prolific goalscorers currently at the club as of 13 September 2024 (Note: Squad and appearance numbers per team Wikipedia page which in turn cites Soccerbase.) are:

- Tom Cairney – 45
- Ryan Sessegnon – 25 (Note: Across two spells.)
- Harry Wilson – 19 (Note: Including one season on loan.)

== Transfers ==
=== Highest transfer fees paid ===
Rank	Player	From	Fee	Year
1	(Brazil) Kevin	(Ukraine) Shakhtar Donetsk	£34,600,000	2025
2	(Spain) Gonzalo García	(Spain) Real Madrid	£34,200,000	2026
3	(England) Emile Smith Rowe	(England) Arsenal	£27,000,000	2024
3	(Norway) Oscar Bobb	(England) Manchester City	£27,000,000	2026
5	(Northern Ireland) Shea Charles	(England) Southampton	£26,000,000	2026
6	(Ivory Coast) Jean Michaël Seri	(France) Nice	£25,000,000	2018
6	(Denmark) Joachim Andersen	(England) Crystal Palace	£25,000,000	2024
8	(Cameroon) André-Frank Zambo Anguissa	(France) Marseille	£22,800,000	2018
9	(Serbia) Aleksandar Mitrović	(England) Newcastle United	£22,000,000	2018
9	(Nigeria) Alex Iwobi	(England) Everton	£22,000,000	2023

=== Highest transfer fees received ===
Rank	Player	To	Fee	Year
1	(Serbia) Aleksandar Mitrović	(Saudi Arabia) Al Hilal	£50,000,000	2023
2	(Portugal) João Palhinha	(Germany) Bayern Munich	£43,400,000	2024
3	(England) Ryan Sessegnon	(England) Tottenham Hotspur	£25,000,000	2019
4	(Belgium) Mousa Dembélé	(England) Tottenham Hotspur	£15,000,000	2012
5	(Cameroon) André-Frank Zambo Anguissa	(Italy) Napoli	£14,700,000	2022
6	(France) Louis Saha	(England) Manchester United	£12,400,000	2004
7	(Scotland) Ross McCormack	(England) Aston Villa	£12,000,000	2016
8	(Serbia) Saša Lukić	(England) Ipswich Town	£9,000,000	2026
9	(Brazil) Andreas Pereira	(Brazil) Palmerias	£8,650,000	2025
10	(Morocco) Issa Diop	(England) Ipswich Town	£8,500,000	2026

== Player of the season ==
=== Winners ===
The following is a list of every Fulham player who has won the Player of the Season award. This is an award voted for by the fans, and commenced at the end of the 2001–02 season.

Player of the Season Winners
Season	Player	Position (Note: The Premier League general reference below links to the database search of all footballers who have played in the league, where the profiles of each winner can be found and their position verified.)	Apps	Goals	Ref(s)
2001–02	(Republic of Ireland) Steve Finnan	Defender	47	0	
2002–03	(England) Sean Davis	Midfielder	45	4	
2003–04	(Netherlands) Edwin van der Sar	Goalkeeper	43	0	
2004–05	(Portugal) Luís Boa Morte	Forward	39	9	
2005–06	(United States) Brian McBride	Forward	39	10	
2006–07	(United States) Brian McBride (2)	Forward	42	12	
2007–08	(Wales) Simon Davies	Midfielder	40	5	
2008–09	(Australia) Mark Schwarzer	Goalkeeper	44	0	
2009–10	(Hungary) Zoltán Gera	Midfielder	50	10	
2010–11	(United States) Clint Dempsey	Forward	42	13	
2011–12	(United States) Clint Dempsey (2)	Forward	46	23	
2012–13	(Bulgaria) Dimitar Berbatov	Forward	35	15	
2013–14	(Iran) Ashkan Dejagah	Midfielder	25	6	
2014–15	(Scotland) Ross McCormack	Forward	51	19	
2015–16	(Scotland) Ross McCormack (2)	Forward	49	23	
2016–17	(Scotland) Tom Cairney	Midfielder	51	13	
2017–18	(United States) Tim Ream	Defender	48	1	
2018–19	(England) Calum Chambers	Defender	33	2	
2019–20	(Serbia) Aleksandar Mitrović	Forward	41	26	
2020–21	(France) Alphonse Areola	Goalkeeper	37	0	
2021–22	(Serbia) Aleksandar Mitrović (2)	Forward	46	43	
2022–23	(Portugal) João Palhinha	Midfielder	40	4	
2023–24	(United States) Antonee Robinson	Defender	38	0	
2024–25	(Nigeria) Calvin Bassey	Defender	37	2	
2025–26	(Wales) Harry Wilson	Forward	41	11	

=== Multiple awards won by players ===
The following table lists the number of awards won by players who have won at least two Player of the Season awards.

Awards	Player	Country	Seasons
2	Brian McBride	United States	2005–06, 2006–07
2	Clint Dempsey	United States	2010–11, 2011–12
2	Ross McCormack	Scotland	2014–15, 2015–16
2	Aleksandar Mitrović	Serbia	2019–20, 2021–22

=== Awards won by nationality ===
Country	Players	Total
United States	4	6
Scotland	2	3
England	2	2
Portugal	2	2
Wales	2	2
Serbia	1	2
Australia	1	1
Bulgaria	1	1
France	1	1
Hungary	1	1
Iran	1	1
Ireland	1	1
Netherlands	1	1
Nigeria	1	1

=== Awards won by position ===
Position	Players	Total
Forward	7	11
Midfielder	6	6
Defender	5	5
Goalkeeper	3	3

== International squad players ==
Algeria

- (Algeria) Hamer Bouazza
- (Algeria) Rafik Halliche

Argentina

- (Argentina) Facundo Sava

Australia

- (Australia) Mark Schwarzer
- (Australia) Adrian Leijer
- (Australia) Len Quested
- (Australia) Ahmad Elrich
- (Australia) Ryan Williams

Austria

- (Austria) Michael Madl

Belgium

- (Belgium) Philippe Albert
- (Belgium) Mousa Dembélé
- (Belgium) Denis Odoi
- (Belgium) Timothy Castagne

Bermuda

- (Bermuda) Kyle Lightbourne

Bulgaria

- (Bulgaria) Dimitar Berbatov

Brazil

- (Brazil) Andreas Pereira
- (Brazil) Carlos Vinícius
- (Brazil) Rodrigo Muniz
- (Brazil) Willian

Cameroon

- (Cameroon) Pierre Womé
- (Cameroon) André-Frank Zambo Anguissa

Canada

- (Canada) Paul Peschisolido
- (Canada) Tomasz Radzinski
- (Canada) Paul Stalteri

Costa Rica

- (Costa Rica) Bryan Ruiz

Czech Republic

- (Czech Republic) Marcel Gecov
- (Czech Republic) Zdeněk Grygera
- (Czech Republic) Jan Laštůvka

Denmark

- (Denmark) Leon Andreasen
- (Denmark) Claus Jensen
- (Denmark) Bjarne Goldbæk
- (Denmark) Peter Møller
- (Denmark) Joachim Andersen

DR Congo

- (Democratic Republic of the Congo) Neeskens Kebano
- (Democratic Republic of the Congo) Gabriel Zakuani

England

- (England) Alan Mullery
- (England) Bedford Jezzard
- (England) Bernard Joy
- (England) Bobby Moore
- (England) Bobby Robson
- (England) Bobby Zamora
- (England) George Cohen
- (England) Stan Collymore
- (England) Dave Beasant
- (England) Johnny Haynes
- (England) Zat Knight
- (England) Malcolm Macdonald
- (England) Paul Parker
- (England) Rodney Marsh
- (England) Peter Beardsley
- (England) Andy Cole
- (England) Wayne Bridge
- (England) Paul Konchesky
- (England) Danny Murphy
- (England) Andy Johnson
- (England) David Stockdale
- (England) Jim Taylor
- (England) Tim Coleman
- (England) Albert Barrett
- (England) Len Oliver
- (England) Danny Shea
- (England) Arthur 'Pablo' Stevens
- (England) Frank Penn
- (England) Johnny Price
- (England) Jim Langley
- (England) Roy Bentley
- (England) Eddie Lowe
- (England) Pat Beasley
- (England) Allan Clarke
- (England) Robert Wilson
- (England) Lee Clark
- (England) Franky Osborne
- (England) Gordon Hoare
- (England) Arthur Berry
- (England) Johnny 'Budgie' Byrne
- (England) Chris Smalling
- (England) Joe Bacuzzi
- (England) Jim Hammond

Egypt

- (Egypt) Hussein Hegazi

Finland

- (Finland) Jari Litmanen
- (Finland) Toni Kallio
- (Finland) Shefki Kuqi
- (Finland) Antti Niemi
- (Finland) Lauri Dalla Valle

France

- (France) Alain Goma
- (France) Anthony Knockaert
- (France) Aboubakar Kamara
- (France) Martin Djetou
- (France) Steve Marlet
- (France) Louis Saha
- (France) Philippe Christanval
- (France) Olivier Dacourt
- (France) Sylvain Legwinski
- (France) Maxime Le Marchand

Gabon

- (Gabon) Mario Lemina

Germany

- (Germany) Karl-Heinz Riedle
- (Germany) Moritz Volz
- (Germany) Bernd Leno
- (Germany) Steven Benda

Ghana

- (Ghana) John Paintsil
- (Ghana) Elvis Hammond

Gibraltar

- (Gibraltar) Tony Macedo

Great Britain (at the Olympics)

- (United Kingdom) Bobby Brown

Greece

- (Greece) Giorgos Karagounis
- (Greece) Kostas Mitroglou

Guinea

- (Guinea) Ibrahima Cissé

Guinea-Bissau

- (Guinea-Bissau) Mesca
- (Guinea-Bissau) Marcelo Djaló

Hungary

- (Hungary) Zoltán Gera
- (Hungary) Csaba Somogyi

Iceland

- (Iceland) Heiðar Helguson
- (Iceland) Eiður Guðjohnsen
- (Iceland) Ragnar Sigurðsson

Iran

- (Iran) Andranik Teymourian
- (Iran) Ashkan Dejagah

Ireland (Eire)

- (Republic of Ireland) Gerry Peyton
- (Republic of Ireland) Jimmy Conway
- (Republic of Ireland) Ray Houghton
- (Republic of Ireland) Steve Finnan
- (Republic of Ireland) Stephen Kelly
- (Republic of Ireland) Damien Duff
- (Republic of Ireland) Robin Lawler
- (Republic of Ireland) John Dempsey
- (Republic of Ireland) Jimmy Dunne
- (Republic of Ireland) Joe Connor
- (Republic of Ireland) Georgie Reid
- (Republic of Ireland) Terry Phelan
- (Republic of Ireland) Cyrus Christie

Israel

- (Israel) Manor Solomon

Italy

- (Italy) Vincenzo Montella
- (Italy) Marcello Trotta

Ivory Coast

- (Ivory Coast) Jean Michaël Seri

Japan

- (Japan) Junichi Inamoto

Jamaica

- (Jamaica) Barry Hayles
- (Jamaica) Bobby De Cordova-Reid
- (Jamaica) Michael Hector

Latvia

- (Latvia) Andrejs Štolcers

Mali

- (Mali) Mahamadou Diarra

Mexico

- (Mexico) Carlos Salcido
- (Mexico) Raúl Jiménez

Morocco

- (Morocco) Abdeslam Ouaddou

Netherlands

- (Netherlands) Edwin van der Sar
- (Netherlands) Collins John
- (Netherlands) Kenny Tete

New Zealand

- (New Zealand) Simon Elliott

Nigeria

- (Nigeria) Dickson Etuhu
- (Nigeria) Sone Aluko
- (Nigeria) Calvin Bassey
- (Nigeria) Alex Iwobi

Northern Ireland

- (Northern Ireland) Maik Taylor
- (Northern Ireland) Steven Davis
- (Northern Ireland) David Healy
- (Northern Ireland) George Best
- (Northern Ireland) Aaron Hughes
- (Northern Ireland) Chris Baird
- (Northern Ireland) Hugh Kelly
- (Northern Ireland) Johnny Campbell

Norway

- (Norway) Brede Hangeland
- (Norway) Erik Nevland
- (Norway) Bjørn Helge Riise
- (Norway) John Arne Riise
- (Norway) Sander Berge
- (Norway) Stefan Johansen

Pakistan

- (Pakistan) Zesh Rehman

Philippines

- (Philippines) Neil Etheridge

Portugal

- (Portugal) Luís Boa Morte
- (Portugal) Orlando Sá
- (Portugal) Ricardo Batista
- (Portugal) João Palhinha

Russia

- (Russia) Alexey Smertin
- (Russia) Pavel Pogrebnyak

Saint Kitts and Nevis

- (Saint Kitts and Nevis) Calum Willock

Scotland

- (Scotland) John Collins
- (Scotland) Graham Leggat
- (Scotland) Jimmy Sharp
- (Scotland) Ian Black
- (Scotland) Peter Buchanan
- (Scotland) Steve Archibald
- (Scotland) Des Bremner
- (Scotland) Doug Rougvie
- (Scotland) Gordon Boyd
- (Scotland) Ross McCormack
- (Scotland) Tom Cairney
- (Scotland) Kevin McDonald

Senegal

- (Senegal) Papa Bouba Diop
- (Senegal) Diomansy Kamara
- (Senegal) Fodé Ballo-Touré

Serbia

- (Serbia) Dejan Stefanović
- (Serbia) Aleksandar Mitrović
- (Serbia) Saša Lukić

Seychelles

- (Seychelles) Kevin Betsy

Sierra Leone

- (Sierra Leone) Leroy Rosenior

Slovakia

- (Slovakia) Marek Rodák

South Africa

- (South Africa) Kagisho Dikgacoi
- (South Africa) Andre Arendse

South Korea

- (South Korea) Seol Ki-hyeon

Spain

- (Spain) Adama Traoré
- (Spain) Jorge Cuenca

Sweden

- (Sweden) Fredrik Stoor
- (Sweden) Björn Runström
- (Sweden) Alexander Kačaniklić

Switzerland

- (Switzerland) Pascal Zuberbühler
- (Switzerland) Philippe Senderos
- (Switzerland) Pajtim Kasami
- (Switzerland) Kerim Frei

Togo

- (Togo) Floyd Ayité

Trinidad and Tobago

- (Trinidad and Tobago) Tony Warner

United States

- (United States) Clint Dempsey
- (United States) Brian McBride
- (United States) Carlos Bocanegra
- (United States) Kasey Keller
- (United States) Tim Ream
- (United States) Marcus Hahnemann
- (United States) Emerson Hyndman
- (United States) Eddie Lewis
- (United States) Eddie Johnson
- (United States) Marlon Fossey
- (United States) Luca de la Torre
- (United States) Antonee Robinson

Uruguay

- (Uruguay) Martín Herrera

Wales

- (Wales) Andy Melville
- (Wales) Chris Coleman
- (Wales) Gordon Davies
- (Wales) Mark Crossley
- (Wales) Mark Pembridge
- (Wales) Simon Davies
- (Wales) Sonny Gibbon
- (Wales) Kit Symons
- (Wales) Paul Trollope
- (Wales) Jeff Hopkins
- (Wales) Alan Neilson
- (Wales) Dick Richards
- (Wales) Syd Thomas
- (Wales) Harry Wilson
- (Wales) Neco Williams
- (Wales) Daniel James

== Milestones ==
Fulham has never won a major trophy; however, it has a number of achievements. In the list below, all trophies and leagues are referred to by the names they held at the time, which, due to commercial and practical reasons, have changed over time. For more information, see articles in individual leagues from here.

- 1885 – London FA Cup quarter-finalists
- 1886 – West London Cup winners, beating St Matthew's 2–1 in the final
- 1891 – West London Observer Cup winners, Billy Mugford scored a hat-trick when they beat local rivals Stanley 5–3 in a replay.
- 1892 – West London League champions
- 1892 – Middlesex Senior Cup quarter-finalists
- 1892 – London Senior Cup quarter-finalists
- 1893 – West London League champions
- 1893 – West London Cup runners-up
- 1893 – West London Observer Cup runners-up, lost 3–2 to QPR
- 1896 – London Senior Cup runners-up
- 1897–88 – London League runners-up (to Barnet F.C.)
- 1899–1900 – Southern League Second Division, finished runners-up to Watford F.C.
- 1901–02 – Southern League Second Division champions (lost Test (play-off) and was subsequently not promoted)
- 1902–03 – Southern League Second Division Second Division champions
- 1904–05 – Southern League Second Division Second Division champions
- 1906 – Southern League (1st Division) Champions
- 1907 – Southern League (1st Division) Champions
- 1907 – Admission to The Football League as Southern League Champions
- 1908 – FA Cup Semi-Finalists
- 1910 – London Challenge Cup winners (and 1931 and 1951)
- 1912 – FA Cup Quarter-Finalists
- 1919 – London Victory Cup runners up (to Chelsea)
- 1926 – FA Cup Quarter-Finalists
- 1932 – Division Three South Champions
- 1936 – FA Cup Semi-Finalists
- 1939 – FA Cup Quarter-Finalists
- 1948 – FA Cup Quarter-Finalists
- 1949 – Division Two Champions
- 1951 – FA Cup Quarter-Finalists
- 1958 – FA Cup Semi-Finalists
- 1959 – Promotion from Division Two
- 1962 – FA Cup Semi-Finalists
- 1968 – League Cup Quarter-Finalists
- 1971 – Promotion from Division Three
- 1975 – FA Cup Finalists (Best ever finish)
- 1975 – Anglo-Scottish Cup Finalists
- 1982 – Promotion from Division Three
- 1997 – Promotion from Division Three
- 1999 – Division Two Champions
- 2001 – Division One Champions
- 2002 – FA Cup Semi-Finalists
- 2002 – UEFA Intertoto Cup winners
- 2003 – UEFA Cup 3rd round
- 2004 – Ninth-place finish in the Premier League
- 2009 – Seventh-placed finish in the Premier League; highest-ever finish, qualify for Europa League
- 2010 – UEFA Europa League finalists, defeating Juventus 4–1 at home en route to the final.
- 2011 – Eighth-place finish in the Premier League. Europa League qualification via Fair Play league
- 2012 – Defeated rivals Queens Park Rangers 6–0 in October with Andy Johnson scoring Fulham's first ever Premier League hat-trick. Finish in 9th.
- 2018 – Promotion from the EFL Championship to the Premier League via the play-offs, defeating Aston Villa 1–0 in the final at Wembley Stadium on 26 May.
- 2020 – Promotion from the EFL Championship to the Premier League via the play-offs, defeating Brentford 2–1 in the final at Wembley Stadium on 4 August.
- 2022 – EFL Championship champions, promotion to the Premier League, with Aleksandar Mitrovic scoring a record 43 goals in 43 league games, and recording 7-0 wins on three occasions, and two 6-2 wins within the space of a week.
- 2024 – EFL Cup Semi-Finalists (Best ever finish)

== Fulham in Europe ==
Season	Competition	Round	Country	Club	Score
2002–03	UEFA Intertoto Cup	2R	(Finland)	Haka	0–0, 1–1 (away goal)
2002–03	UEFA Intertoto Cup	3R	(Greece)	Egaleo	1–0, 1–1
2002–03	UEFA Intertoto Cup	SF	(France)	Sochaux	1–0, 2–0
2002–03	UEFA Intertoto Cup	F	(Italy)	Bologna	2–2, 1–3

Season	Competition	Round	Country	Club	Score
2002–03	UEFA Cup	1R	(Croatia)	Hajduk Split	1–0, 2–2
2002–03	UEFA Cup	2R	(Croatia)	Dinamo Zagreb	3–0, 2–1
2002–03	UEFA Cup	3R	(Germany)	Hertha BSC	1–2, 0–0

=== 2009–10 Europa League ===
Date	Round	Opponents	H / A	Result F – A	Scorers	Attendance
30 July	Third qualifying round, 1st leg	(Lithuania) Vėtra	A	3–0	Zamora 44', Murphy 56' (pen.), Seol 84'	5,900
6 August	Third qualifying round, 2nd leg	(Lithuania) Vėtra	H	3–0	Etuhu 57', A. Johnson 80', 84'	15,016
20 August	Play-off round, 1st leg	(Russia) Amkar Perm	H	3–1	A. Johnson 4', Dempsey 51', Zamora 75' (Amkar Perm: Vitaliy Grishin 77')	13,029
27 August	Play-off round, 2nd leg	(Russia) Amkar Perm	A	0–1	(Amkar Perm: Kushev 90')	20,000
17 September	Group stage	(Bulgaria) CSKA Sofia	A	1–1	Kamara 65' (CSKA Sofia: Michel 62')	28,000
1 October	Group stage	(Switzerland) Basel	H	1–0	Murphy 57'	16,100
22 October	Group stage	(Italy) Roma	H	1–1	Hangeland 24' (Roma: Andreolli 90+3')	23,561
5 November	Group stage	(Italy) Roma	A	1–2	Kamara 19' (pen.) (Roma: Riise 69', Okaka 76')	20,000
3 December	Group stage	(Bulgaria) CSKA Sofia	H	1–0	Gera 14'	23,604
16 December	Group stage	(Switzerland) Basel	A	3–2	Zamora 42', 45', Gera 77' (Basel: Frei 64' (pen.), Streller 87')	20,063
18 February	Round of 32, 1st leg	(Ukraine) Shakhtar Donetsk	H	2–1	Gera 3', Zamora 63' (Shakhtar Donetsk: Luiz Adriano 32')	21,832
25 February	Round of 32, 2nd leg	(Ukraine) Shakhtar Donetsk	A	1–1	Hangeland 33' (Shakhtar Donetsk: Jádson 69')	47,509
11 March	Round of 16, 1st leg	(Italy) Juventus	A	1–3	Etuhu 36' (Juventus: Legrottaglie 9', Zebina 25', Trezeguet 48')	11,402
18 March	Round of 16, 2nd leg	(Italy) Juventus	H	4–1	Zamora 9', Gera 39',49' (pen.), Dempsey 82' (Juventus: Trezeguet 2')	23,458
1 April	Quarter-final, 1st leg	(Germany) VfL Wolfsburg	H	2–1	Zamora 59', Duff 63' (Wolfsburg: Madlung 89')	22,307
8 April	Quarter-final, 2nd leg	(Germany) VfL Wolfsburg	A	1–0	Zamora 1'	24,843
22 April	Semi-final, 1st leg	(Germany) Hamburger SV	A	0–0		49,171
29 April	Semi-final, 2nd leg	(Germany) Hamburger SV	H	2–1	Davies 69', Gera 76' (Hamburg: Petrić 22')	25,700
12 May	Final	(Spain) Atlético Madrid	N	1–2	Davies 37' (Atlético: Forlán 32',116,)	49,000

=== Group stage: final table ===
Team	Pld	W	D	L	GF	GA	GD	Pts
(Italy) Roma	6	4	1	1	10	5	+5	13
(England) Fulham	6	3	2	1	8	6	+2	11
(Switzerland) Basel	6	3	0	3	10	7	+3	9
(Bulgaria) CSKA Sofia	6	0	1	5	2	12	−10	1

=== 2011–12 Europa League ===
Date	Round	Opponents	H / A	Result F – A	Scorers	Attendance
30 June	First qualifying round, 1st leg	(Faroe Islands) NSI	H	3–0	Duff 33', Murphy 61' (pen.), Andy Johnson 70'	14,910
7 July	First qualifying round, 2nd leg	(Faroe Islands) NSI	A	0–0		1,245
14 July	Second qualifying round, 1st leg	(Northern Ireland) Crusaders	A	3–1	Briggs 39', Zamora 74', Murphy 77'	2,477
21 July	Second qualifying round, 2nd leg	(Northern Ireland) Crusaders	H	4–0	Johnson 19', Murphy 56', Zamora 66', Sidwell 70'	14,910
28 July	Third qualifying round, 1st leg	(Croatia) Split	A	0–0		4,000
4 August	Third qualifying round, 2nd leg	(Croatia) Split	H	2–0	Johnson 19', Murphy 56'	17,087

=== Group stage: final table ===
Pos	Team	Pld	W	D	L	GF	GA	GD	Pts	Qualification	TWE	WK	FUL	OB
1	(Netherlands) Twente	6	4	1	1	14	7	+7	13	Advance to knockout phase	—	4–1	1–0	3–2
2	(Poland) Wisła Kraków	6	3	0	3	8	13	−5	9	Advance to knockout phase	2–1	—	1–0	1–3
3	(England) Fulham	6	2	2	2	9	6	+3	8		1–1	4–1	—	2–2
4	(Denmark) Odense	6	1	1	4	9	14	−5	4		1–4	1–2	0–2	—

Source: Soccerway

== Penalty shoot-outs ==
Season	Date	Competition	Round	Opponent	Venue	Result	Score
1999/2000	12 January 2000	League Cup	Fifth Round	Leicester City	Away	Lost	0–3
2001/02	11 September 2001	League Cup	Second Round	Rochdale	Away	Won	6–5
2007/08	22 January 2008	FA Cup	Third Round	Bristol Rovers	Away	Lost	3–5
2011/12	21 September 2011	League Cup	Third Round	Chelsea	Away	Lost	3–4
2013/14	27 August 2013	League Cup	Second Round	Burton Albion	Away	Won	5–4
2014/15	13 January 2015	FA Cup	Third Round	Wolverhampton Wanderers	Away	Won	5–3
2021/22	21 September 2021	EFL Cup	Third Round	Leeds United	Home	Lost	5–6
2023/24	29 August 2023	EFL Cup	Second Round	Tottenham Hotspur	Home	Won	5–3
2023/24	19 December 2023	EFL Cup	Quarter-finals	Everton	Away	Won	7–6
2024/25	17 September 2024	EFL Cup	Third Round	Preston North End	Away	Lost	15–16
2024/25	2 March 2025	FA Cup	Fifth Round	Manchester United	Away	Won	4–3
2025/26	28 October 2025	EFL Cup	Fourth Round	Wycombe Wanderers	Away	Won	5–4
