= 1999–2000 Fulham F.C. season =

Fulham
1999–2000 season
- Chairman: Mohamed Al-Fayed
- Manager: Paul Bracewell (until 29 March); Karl-Heinz Riedle/Roy Evans (caretakers from 29 March until end of season)
- Stadium: Craven Cottage
- First Division: 9th
- FA Cup: Fifth round
- Football League Cup: Fifth round
- Top goalscorer: League: Lee Clark (7); All: Geoff Horsfield (14)
- Average home league attendance: 13,076
Home colours

During the 1999–2000 English football season, Fulham F.C. competed in the Football League First Division.

== Season summary ==
Before the 1999-2000 season, Paul Bracewell was appointed as Fulham manager and despite them competing in the top half of Division One throughout the campaign, Bracewell was sacked on 30 March 2000 by millionaire owner Mohamed Al-Fayed after failing to provide instant success that was demanded from the owner who is desperate to see Fulham play Premiership football and Karl-Heinz Riedle along with assistant Roy Evans took over as caretaker managers on a temporary basis until the end of the season and they guided the Cottagers to a 9th-place finish. On 9 April 2000, the more experienced Jean Tigana was appointed as Bracewell's successor and took over in July.

== Final league table ==
Pos	Team	Pld	W	D	L	GF	GA	GD	Pts
7	Wolverhampton Wanderers	46	21	11	14	64	48	+16	74
8	Huddersfield Town	46	21	11	14	62	49	+13	74
9	Fulham	46	17	16	13	49	41	+8	67
10	Queens Park Rangers	46	16	18	12	62	53	+9	66
11	Blackburn Rovers	46	15	17	14	55	51	+4	62

Rules for classification: 1) Points; 2) Goal difference; 3) Goals scored

Results summary

Overall								Home						Away					
Pld	W	D	L	GF	GA	GD	Pts	W	D	L	GF	GA	GD	W	D	L	GF	GA	GD
46	17	16	13	49	41	+8	67	13	7	3	33	13	+20	4	9	10	16	28	−12

Source: Soccerbase: 1999-2000 Football League First Division table

Results by round

Round	1	2	3	4	5	6	7	8	9	10	11	12	13	14	15	16	17	18	19	20	21	22	23	24	25	26	27	28	29	30	31	32	33	34	35	36	37	38	39	40	41	42	43	44	45	46
Ground	A	H	A	H	A	A	H	H	A	H	H	A	A	H	A	H	H	A	H	A	H	A	A	H	A	H	A	H	H	A	A	H	A	H	H	A	H	A	A	H	A	H	A	H	A	H
Result	D	D	D	W	D	W	W	W	W	W	L	D	D	D	L	W	L	L	D	W	D	D	D	D	L	W	L	L	W	W	L	W	D	W	W	L	D	L	L	W	D	W	L	D	L	W
Position	11	14	16	10	8	6	5	3	2	2	3	4	3	5	8	4	6	8	8	6	6	6	7	7	9	8	10	10	8	8	8	8	8	8	7	8	8	9	10	10	9	9	9	9	9	9

Source: 11v11.com: 1999-2000 Fulham results
A = Away; H = Home; W = Win; D = Draw; L = Loss

== Results ==
Fulham's score comes first

=== Legend ===
Win	Draw	Loss

=== Football League First Division ===
Date	Opponent	Venue	Result	Attendance	Scorers
7 August 1999	Birmingham City	A	2–2	24,042	Horsfield (2)
14 August 1999	Manchester City	H	0–0	16,754	
21 August 1999	Grimsby Town	A	1–1	6,196	Finnan
28 August 1999	Charlton Athletic	H	2–1	15,154	Neilson, Peschisolido
30 August 1999	West Bromwich Albion	A	0–0	17,120	
11 September 1999	Port Vale	A	2–0	6,130	Peschisolido, Coleman
18 September 1999	Queens Park Rangers	H	1–0	19,623	Peschisolido
25 September 1999	Crewe Alexandra	H	3–0	12,156	Horsfield, Hayles, Symons
2 October 1999	Norwich City	A	2–1	16,332	Riedle, Hayles
16 October 1999	Swindon Town	H	1–0	13,715	Horsfield
19 October 1999	Wolverhampton Wanderers	H	0–1	13,160	
23 October 1999	Huddersfield Town	A	1–1	13,350	Gray (own goal)
26 October 1999	Crewe Alexandra	A	1–1	5,493	Coleman
30 October 1999	Norwich City	H	1–1	13,552	Symons
6 November 1999	Stockport County	A	1–2	7,200	Cadamarteri
9 November 1999	Portsmouth	H	1–0	13,229	Collins
13 November 1999	Barnsley	H	1–3	10,635	Riedle
20 November 1999	Blackburn Rovers	A	0–2	18,543	
23 November 1999	Bolton Wanderers	H	1–1	9,642	Peschisolido (pen)
26 November 1999	Walsall	A	3–1	5,449	Riedle, Horsfield (2)
4 December 1999	Birmingham City	H	0–0	12,290	
15 December 1999	Nottingham Forest	A	0–0	14,250	
18 December 1999	Crystal Palace	A	0–0	17,480	
26 December 1999	Ipswich Town	H	0–0	17,255	
28 December 1999	Sheffield United	A	0–2	17,375	
3 January 2000	Tranmere Rovers	H	1–0	11,377	Roberts (own goal)
16 January 2000	Manchester City	A	0–4	30,057	
22 January 2000	Grimsby Town	H	0–1	10,802	
5 February 2000	West Bromwich Albion	H	1–0	12,044	Riedle (pen)
12 February 2000	Portsmouth	A	1–0	17,337	Goldbæk
15 February 2000	Charlton Athletic	A	0–1	19,940	
19 February 2000	Walsall	H	2–0	10,540	Phelan, Clark
28 February 2000	Queens Park Rangers	A	0–0	16,308	
4 March 2000	Port Vale	H	3–1	10,418	Clark (2), Melville
7 March 2000	Stockport County	H	4–1	8,688	Hayles (2), Goldbæk, Finnan
11 March 2000	Bolton Wanderers	A	1–3	12,761	Clark
18 March 2000	Blackburn Rovers	H	2–2	15,108	Hayles, Riedle
21 March 2000	Barnsley	A	0–1	14,262	
25 March 2000	Ipswich Town	A	0–1	20,168	
1 April 2000	Crystal Palace	H	1–0	16,356	Horsfield
9 April 2000	Tranmere Rovers	A	1–1	7,132	Melville
15 April 2000	Sheffield United	H	4–0	12,197	Phelan, Clark (2), Melville
22 April 2000	Swindon Town	A	0–1	7,556	
24 April 2000	Nottingham Forest	H	1–1	12,696	Coleman
30 April 2000	Wolverhampton Wanderers	A	0–3	19,912	
7 May 2000	Huddersfield Town	H	3–0	13,728	Clark (2) (1 pen), Goldbæk

=== FA Cup ===
Round	Date	Opponent	Venue	Result	Attendance	Goalscorers
R3	11 December 1999	Luton Town	H	2–2	8,251	Horsfield, Davis
R3R	21 December 1999	Luton Town	A	3–0	8,170	Hayles (2), Hayward
R4	8 January 2000	Wimbledon	H	3–0	16,177	Collins (2), Finnan
R5	29 January 2000	Tranmere Rovers	H	1–2	13,859	Coleman

=== League Cup ===
Round	Date	Opponent	Venue	Result	Attendance	Goalscorers
R1 1st Leg	10 August 1999	Northampton Town	A	2–1	4,415	Davis, Horsfield
R1 2nd Leg	24 August 1999	Northampton Town	H	3–1	5,515	Horsfield (3)
R2 1st Leg	14 September 1999	Norwich City	A	4–0	11,160	Peschisolido, Clark, Coote (own goal), Collins
R2 2nd Leg	21 September 1999	Norwich City	H	2–0	5,246	Hayles, Davis
R3	12 October 1999	West Bromwich Albion	A	2–1	10,556	Peschisolido, Collymore
R4	1 December 1999	Tottenham Hotspur	H	3–1	18,134	Hayles, Horsfield, Collins
QF	12 January 2000	Leicester City	A	3–3 a.e.t. (pen 0–3)	13,576	Peschisolido, Horsfield, Coleman

== Players ==
=== First-team squad ===
Squad at end of season

Note: Flags indicate national team as defined under FIFA eligibility rules; some limited exceptions apply. Players may hold more than one non-FIFA nationality.

No.	Pos.	Nation	Player
1	GK	NIR	Maik Taylor (Note: Taylor was born in Hildesheim, West Germany, but qualified to represent any of the home nations internationally as he holds a British passport, and made his international debut for Northern Ireland in 1999.)
2	DF	IRL	Steve Finnan
3	DF	ENG	Rufus Brevett
4	DF	WAL	Andy Melville
5	DF	WAL	Chris Coleman
6	DF	WAL	Kit Symons (Note: Symons was born in Basingstoke, England, but also qualified to represent Wales internationally through his father and made his international debut for Wales in February 1992.)
7	MF	WAL	Paul Trollope (Note: Trollope was born in Swindon, England, but also qualified to represent Wales internationally and made his international debut for Wales in May 1997.)
8	MF	ENG	Lee Clark
9	FW	ENG	Geoff Horsfield
10	FW	CAN	Paul Peschisolido
11	MF	ENG	Steve Hayward
12	GK	USA	Marcus Hahnemann
13	FW	GER	Karl-Heinz Riedle
14	DF	ENG	Simon Morgan
15	FW	ENG	Barry Hayles (Note: Hayles was born in Lambeth, England, but also qualified to represent Jamaica internationally and made his international debut for Jamaica in June 2001, having previously represented the Cayman Islands internationally despite being ineligible to do so.)
16	DF	WAL	Alan Neilson (Note: Neilson was born in Wegberg, West Germany, but also qualified to represent Wales internationally and made his international debut for Wales in February 1992.)

No.	Pos.	Nation	Player
17	MF	ENG	Wayne Collins
18	MF	ENG	Kevin Ball
19	MF	DEN	Bjarne Goldbæk
20	DF	SUR	Gus Uhlenbeek
21	FW	ENG	Ian Selley
22	DF	SCO	Steve McAnespie
23	MF	ENG	Sean Davis
24	MF	ENG	Paul Brooker
25	DF	ENG	Ian McGuckin
26	MF	ENG	Kevin Betsy (Note: Betsy was born in Woking, England, but also qualified to represent Seychelles internationally and would make his international debut for Seychelles in June 2011.)
27	DF	ENG	Zat Knight
28	FW	ENG	Luke Cornwall
29	DF	IRL	Terry Phelan (Note: Phelan was born in Manchester, England, but also qualified to represent the Republic of Ireland internationally and made his international debut for the Republic of Ireland in 1991.)
30	GK	ENG	Glyn Thompson
31	MF	USA	Eddie Lewis

=== Left club during season ===
Note: Flags indicate national team as defined under FIFA eligibility rules; some limited exceptions apply. Players may hold more than one non-FIFA nationality.

No.	Pos.	Nation	Player
18	MF	ENG	John Salako (Note: Salako was born in Ibadan, Nigeria, but also qualified to represent England internationally and made his international debut for England in 1991.) (to Charlton Athletic)
18	FW	ENG	Danny Cadamarteri (on loan from Everton)
19	MF	ENG	Neil Smith (to Reading)

No.	Pos.	Nation	Player
29	FW	ENG	Stan Collymore (on loan from Aston Villa)
30	MF	ENG	Stephen Hughes (on loan from Arsenal)

=== Reserve squad ===
Note: Flags indicate national team as defined under FIFA eligibility rules; some limited exceptions apply. Players may hold more than one non-FIFA nationality.

No.	Pos.	Nation	Player
—	DF	ENG	Mark Hudson
—	MF	ENG	Sammy Keevil

No.	Pos.	Nation	Player
—	FW	GHA	Elvis Hammond
