= Sidney Thomas =

Sidney Thomas may refer to:

- Sidney R. Thomas (born 1953), American lawyer and judge
- Sidney Gilchrist Thomas (1850–1885), English inventor

== See also ==
- Syd Thomas (1919–2012), Welsh footballer
