= 2002–03 Fulham F.C. season =

Fulham
2002–03 season
- Chairman: Mohamed Al-Fayed
- Manager: Jean Tigana (until 17 April); Chris Coleman (from 17 April)
- Stadium: Loftus Road
- FA Premier League: 14th
- FA Cup: Fifth round
- League Cup: Fourth round
- UEFA Intertoto Cup: Winners
- UEFA Cup: Third round
- Top goalscorer: League: Steed Malbranque (6); All: Steed Malbranque (13)
- Highest home attendance: 18,800 (vs. Arsenal, 3 November, Premier League)
- Lowest home attendance: 4,717 (vs. Sochaux, 31 July, Intertoto Cup)
- Average home league attendance: 16,707

The 2002–03 season was Fulham F.C.'s 105th season in professional football and second consecutive season in the FA Premier League. It was also the first season in over 115 years where Fulham did not play at Craven Cottage. Due to pending decisions on re-vamping the cottage, all home games (apart from two early-season fixtures) were played at Loftus Road, the home of Queens Park Rangers. Jean Tigana remained as Fulham manager up until his sacking in April 2003. Former Fulham player Chris Coleman had not long been retired from the game since suffering a career-ending injury in a car crash when he was appointed caretaker manager for the rest of the season.

Concerning the league, it was another relatively disappointing season for Fulham. Finishing in 14th place, it was seeming Fulham were finding top-flight football more of a struggle than was originally anticipated two years ago. However, an invitation to the Intertoto Cup after the 2001–02 campaign meant that Fulham could play European football for the first time in their history. Upon entering, Fulham went on to be one of the three winners of the competition, allowing them into the first round draw of the UEFA Cup. Performing better than most expected, Fulham reached the third round before being knocked out by German club Hertha BSC.

== Players ==
=== First-team squad ===
Note: Flags indicate national team as defined under FIFA eligibility rules; some limited exceptions apply. Players may hold more than one non-FIFA nationality.

No.	Pos.	Nation	Player
1	GK	NED	Edwin van der Sar
2	DF	IRL	Steve Finnan
4	DF	WAL	Andy Melville
6	MF	JPN	Junichi Inamoto (on loan from Gamba Osaka)
7	FW	FRA	Steve Marlet
8	MF	ENG	Lee Clark
9	FW	ARG	Facundo Sava
10	MF	SCO	John Collins
11	FW	POR	Luís Boa Morte
12	GK	NIR	Maik Taylor (Note: Taylor was born in Hildesheim, West Germany (now Germany), but qualified to represent any of the home nations internationally as he holds a British passport, and made his international debut for Northern Ireland in 1999.)
13	GK	ENG	Ross Flitney
14	MF	FRA	Steed Malbranque (Note: Malbranque was born in Mouscron, Belgium, but also qualified to represent France internationally, and represented them at U-21 level before being called up by France in February 2004 without playing.)
15	FW	JAM	Barry Hayles (Note: Hayles was born in Lambeth, England, but also qualified to represent Jamaica internationally and made his international debut for Jamaica in June 2001, having previously represented the Cayman Islands internationally despite being ineligible to do so.)
16	DF	ENG	Zat Knight
17	DF	FRA	Martin Djetou (Note: Djetou was born in Brogohlo, Ivory Coast, but was raised in France and made his international debut for France in 1996.) (on loan from Parma)
18	MF	FRA	Sylvain Legwinski

No.	Pos.	Nation	Player
19	MF	DEN	Bjarne Goldbæk
20	FW	FRA	Louis Saha
21	GK	ARG	Martín Herrera
23	MF	ENG	Sean Davis
24	DF	FRA	Alain Goma
25	DF	MAR	Abdeslam Ouaddou
26	DF	ENG	Jon Harley
27	DF	CMR	Pierre Womé (on loan from Bologna)
31	MF	ENG	Darren Pratley
33	FW	ENG	Calum Willock (Note: Willock was born in Lambeth, England, but also qualified to represent Saint Kitts and Nevis internationally and would make his international debut for Saint Kitts and Nevis in 2004.)
34	FW	GHA	Elvis Hammond
36	DF	ENG	Mark Hudson
38	FW	ENG	Luke Cornwall
39	DF	ENG	Dean Leacock
40	MF	LAT	Andrejs Štolcers

=== Left club during season ===
Note: Flags indicate national team as defined under FIFA eligibility rules; some limited exceptions apply. Players may hold more than one non-FIFA nationality.

No.	Pos.	Nation	Player
3	DF	ENG	Rufus Brevett (to West Ham United)
5	DF	WAL	Chris Coleman (retired)
30	GK	ENG	Glyn Thompson (to Northampton Town)

No.	Pos.	Nation	Player
31	MF	USA	Eddie Lewis (to Preston North End)
35	DF	SCO	Kieran McAnespie (Note: McAnespie was born in Gosport, England, but also qualified to represent Scotland internationally, and represented them at U-21 level.) (to Plymouth Argyle)

=== Reserves and academy ===
Note: Flags indicate national team as defined under FIFA eligibility rules; some limited exceptions apply. Players may hold more than one non-FIFA nationality.

No.	Pos.	Nation	Player
—	DF	ENG	Adam Green
—	DF	ENG	Zesh Rehman (Note: Rehman was born in Birmingham, England and represented them at U-18, U-19 and U-20 level, but qualified to represent Pakistan internationally through his parents and would make his international debut for Pakistan in December 2005.)
—	MF	ENG	Sean Doherty

No.	Pos.	Nation	Player
—	MF	IRL	Michael Timlin (Note: Timlin was born in Peckham, England, but also qualified to represent the Republic of Ireland internationally and represented them at U-17 and U-21 level.)
—	FW	SCO	Stuart Noble

== Transfers ==
=== Summer ===
==== In ====
Note: Flags indicate national team as defined under FIFA eligibility rules; some limited exceptions apply. Players may hold more than one non-FIFA nationality.

No.	Pos.	Nation	Player
—	FW	ARG	Facundo Sava (from (Argentina) Gimnasia – £2,000,000)
—	GK	ARG	Martín Herrera (from (Spain) Alavés – free)
—	DF	FRA	Martin Djetou (two-year loan from (Italy) Parma)

No.	Pos.	Nation	Player
—	MF	JPN	Junichi Inamoto (season-long loan from (Japan) Gamba Osaka)
—	DF	CMR	Pierre Womé (season-long loan from (Italy) Bologna)

==== Out ====
Note: Flags indicate national team as defined under FIFA eligibility rules; some limited exceptions apply. Players may hold more than one non-FIFA nationality.

No.	Pos.	Nation	Player
—	GK	USA	Marcus Hahnemann (released)
—	MF	WAL	Paul Trollope (to (England) Northampton Town – free)

No.	Pos.	Nation	Player
—	MF	USA	Eddie Lewis (to (England) Preston North End – undisclosed)

=== Winter ===
==== Out ====
Note: Flags indicate national team as defined under FIFA eligibility rules; some limited exceptions apply. Players may hold more than one non-FIFA nationality.

No. / Pos. / Nation / Player; — / FW / ENG / Luke Cornwall (one-month loan to (England) Lincoln City)	No. / Pos. / Nation / Player; — / DF / ENG / Rufus Brevett (to (England) West Ham United - undisclosed)

== League table ==
Pos	Team	Pld	W	D	L	GF	GA	GD	Pts
12	Charlton Athletic	38	14	7	17	45	56	−11	49
13	Birmingham City	38	13	9	16	41	49	−8	48
14	Fulham	38	13	9	16	41	50	−9	48
15	Leeds United	38	14	5	19	58	57	+1	47
16	Aston Villa	38	12	9	17	42	47	−5	45

Source: Premier League
Rules for classification: 1) points; 2) goal difference; 3) number of goals scored.

== Results ==
=== Premier League ===
Matchday	1	2	3	4	5	6	7	8	9	10	11	12	13	14	15	16	17	18	19	20	21	22	23	24	25	26	27	28	29	30	31	32	33	34	35	36	37	38
Ground	H	A	A	H	A	H	A	H	H	H	A	H	A	A	H	A	H	H	A	A	H	A	H	A	A	H	H	A	H	H	A	H	A	H	A	A	H	A
Result	W	D	L	W	W	D	L	W	D	L	L	L	L	D	W	L	W	L	L	D	L	D	W	L	L	W	W	D	W	D	L	L	L	W	L	D	W	W
Position	2	3	14	8	6	6	9	6	9	9	11	11	13	13	12	14	13	14	14	15	16	16	15	15	15	15	15	15	13	13	13	13	15	14	16	15	15	14

Source: WorldFootball.com
A = Away; H = Home; W = Win; D = Draw; L = Loss

17 August 2002 1	Fulham	4–1	Bolton Wanderers	Fulham, London
15:00 BST	Saha 11' (pen.); Legwinski 34', 79'; Marlet 38'	Report	Ricketts 3' (pen.)	Stadium: Loftus Road; Attendance: 16,338; Referee: Alan Wiley

24 August 2002 2	Middlesbrough	2–2	Fulham	Middlesbrough, North Yorkshire
15:00 BST	Maccarone 32', 51'	Report	Davis 89'; Sava 90'	Stadium: Riverside Stadium; Attendance: 28,588; Referee: Mike Dean

31 August 2002 3	West Bromwich Albion	1–0	Fulham	West Bromwich, West Midlands
15:00 BST	Moore 48'	Report		Stadium: The Hawthorns; Attendance: 25,461; Referee: Rob Styles

11 September 2002 4	Fulham	3–2	Tottenham Hotspur	Fulham, London
19:45 BST	Inamoto 68'; Malbranque 84' (pen.); Legwinski 90'	Report	Richards 36'; Sheringham 44'	Stadium: Loftus Road; Attendance: 16,757; Referee: Mark Halsey

14 September 2002 5	Sunderland	0–3	Fulham	Sunderland, Tyne and Wear
15:00 BST		Report	Inamoto 34'; Hayles 54'; Marlet 78'	Stadium: Stadium of Light; Attendance: 35,432; Referee: Chris Foy

23 September 2002 6	Fulham	0–0	Chelsea	Fulham, London
20:00 BST		Report		Stadium: Loftus Road; Attendance: 16,503; Referee: Paul Durkin

28 September 2002 7	Everton	2–0	Fulham	Liverpool, Merseyside
15:00 BST	Gravesen 45'; Campbell 45+2'	Report		Stadium: Goodison Park; Attendance: 34,371; Referee: Steve Dunn

6 October 2002 8	Fulham	1–0	Charlton Athletic	Fulham, London
13:00 BST	Sava 36'	Report		Stadium: Loftus Road; Attendance: 14,775; Referee: Jeff Winter

19 October 2002 9	Fulham	1–1	Manchester United	Fulham, London
	Marlet 35'	Report	Solskjær 62'	Stadium: Loftus Road; Attendance: 18,103; Referee: Mike Dean

23 October 2002 10	Fulham	0–1	West Ham United	Fulham, London
	Knight (red card) 90'	Report	Di Canio 90' (pen.)	Stadium: Loftus Road; Attendance: 15,858; Referee: Rob Styles

27 October 2002 11	Southampton	4–2	Fulham	Southampton, Hampshire
	Beattie 27' (pen.), 42', 53'; Ormerod 72'	Report	Clark 15'; Malbranque 25'	Stadium: St. Mary's; Attendance: 26,188; Referee: Mark Halsey

3 November 2002 12	Fulham	0–1	Arsenal	Fulham, London
		Report	Marlet 31' (o.g.)	Stadium: Loftus Road; Attendance: 18,800; Referee: Jeff Winter

9 November 2002 13	Aston Villa	3–1	Fulham	Birmingham, West Midlands
	Ángel 20'; Allbäck 66'; Leonhardsen 83'	Report	Boa Morte 51'	Stadium: Villa Park; Attendance: 29,563; Referee: Andy D'Urso

17 November 2002 14	Birmingham City	0–0	Fulham	Birmingham, West Midlands
15:00 GMT (UTC)		Report	Brevett (red card) 37'; Marlet (red card) 79'	Stadium: St Andrew's; Attendance: 26,164; Referee: Matt Messias

23 November 2002 15	Fulham	3–2	Liverpool	Fulham, London
	Sava 5', 68'; Davis 38'	Report	Hamann 62'; Baroš 86'	Stadium: Loftus Road; Attendance: 18,144; Referee: Graham Poll

30 November 2002 16	Blackburn Rovers	2–1	Fulham	Blackburn
	Yorke 36'; Brevett 77' (o.g.)	Report	Marlet 60'	Stadium: Ewood Park; Attendance: 21,096; Referee: Phil Dowd

7 December 2002 17	Fulham	1–0	Leeds United	Fulham, London
	Djetou 10'	Report		Stadium: Loftus Road; Attendance: 17,494; Referee: Paul Durkin

15 December 2002 18	Fulham	0–1	Birmingham City	Fulham, London
14:00 GMT (UTC)		Report	Kirovski 7'; Purse (red card) 70'	Stadium: Loftus Road; Attendance: 14,962; Referee: Andy D'Urso

21 December 2002 19	Newcastle United	2–0	Fulham	Newcastle upon Tyne, Tyneside
15:00	Solano 8'; Bellamy 70'	Report	Womé (red card) 66'	Stadium: St James' Park; Attendance: 51,576; Referee: Alan Wiley

26 December 2002 20	West Ham United	1–1	Fulham	London
	Sinclair 65'	Report	Sava 49'	Stadium: Boleyn Ground; Attendance: 35,025; Referee: Dermot Gallagher

28 December 2002 21	Fulham	0–1	Manchester City	Fulham, London
15:00		Report	Anelka 15'	Stadium: Loftus Road; Attendance: 17,937; Referee: Paul Durkin

1 January 2003	Fulham	P–P	West Bromwich Albion	Fulham, London
		Report		Stadium: Loftus Road; Referee: Graham Barber

11 January 2003 22	Bolton Wanderers	0–0	Fulham	Horwich
		Report		Stadium: University of Bolton Stadium; Attendance: 25,156; Referee: Alan Wiley

19 January 2003 23	Fulham	1–0	Middlesbrough	Fulham, London
	Davis 39'	Report		Stadium: Loftus Road; Attendance: 14,253; Referee: Mark Halsey

29 January 2003 24	Manchester City	4–1	Fulham	Manchester
15:00	Anelka 21'; Benarbia 47'; Foé 61'; Wright-Phillips 70'	Report	Malbranque 2'	Stadium: Maine Road; Attendance: 33,260; Referee: Steve Bennett

1 February 2003 25	Arsenal	2–1	Fulham	Islington, London
	Pires 17', 90'	Report	Malbranque 29'	Stadium: Highbury; Attendance: 38,050; Referee: Eddie Wolstenholme

8 February 2003 26	Fulham	2–1	Aston Villa	Fulham, London
		Report		Stadium: Loftus Road

19 February 2003 27	Fulham	3–0	West Bromwich Albion	Fulham, London
				Stadium: Loftus Road

24 February 2003 28	Tottenham Hotspur	1–1	Fulham	London
	Sheringham 40' (pen.)	Report	King 15' (o.g.)	Stadium: White Hart Lane; Attendance: 34,704; Referee: Graham Barber

1 March 2003 29	Fulham	1–0	Sunderland	Fulham, London
				Stadium: Loftus Road

15 March 2003 30	Fulham	2–2	Southampton	Fulham, London
				Stadium: Loftus Road

22 March 2003 31	Manchester United	3–0	Fulham	Manchester
				Stadium: Old Trafford

7 April 2003 32	Fulham	0–4	Blackburn Rovers	Fulham, London
			David Dunn 37' (pen.); Hakan Şükür 42', 54'; Damien Duff 53'	Stadium: Loftus Road

12 April 2003 33	Liverpool	2–0	Fulham	Liverpool, Merseyside
	Heskey 36'; Owen 59'	Report		Stadium: Anfield; Attendance: 42,120; Referee: Alan Wiley

19 April 2003 34	Fulham	2–1	Newcastle United	Fulham, London
15:00	Lewinski 69'; Clark 86'	Report	Shearer 39'; Griffin (yellow card) 63' (red card)	Stadium: Loftus Road; Attendance: 17,900; Referee: Dermot Gallagher

22 April 2003 35	Leeds United	2–0	Fulham	Leeds, West Yorkshire
	Viduka 4', 49'	Report		Stadium: Elland Road; Attendance: 37,220; Referee: Neale Barry

26 April 2003 36	Chelsea	1–1	Fulham	Fulham
				Stadium: Stamford Bridge

3 May 2003 37	Fulham	2–0	Everton	Fulham, London
				Stadium: Loftus Road

11 May 2003 38	Charlton Athletic	0–1	Fulham	Charlton
				Stadium: The Valley

=== League Cup ===
6 November 2002 3	Fulham	3–1	Bury	Fulham, London
	Štolcers 40', 53'; Clark 73'	Report	Newby 90'	Stadium: Craven Cottage; Attendance: 6,700; Referee: David Pugh

4 December 2002 4	Wigan Athletic	2–1	Fulham	Wigan, Greater Manchester
	Ellington 20', 28'	Report	Boa Morte 86'	Stadium: JJB Stadium; Attendance: 7,651; Referee: Mark Halsey

=== FA Cup ===
5 January 2003 3	Fulham	3–1	Birmingham City	Fulham, London
	Sava 11'; Goldbæk 23'; Saha 46'	Report	John 90'	Stadium: Loftus Road; Attendance: 9,203; Referee: Neale Barry

26 January 2003 4	Fulham	3–0	Charlton Athletic	Fulham, London
	Malbranque 59', 66' (pen.), 87' (pen.)	(Report)	Fish (red card) 86'	Stadium: Loftus Road; Attendance: 12,203; Referee: Paul Durkin

16 February 2003 5	Fulham	1–1	Burnley	Fulham, London
	Malbranque 45'	Report	Moore 4'	Stadium: Loftus Road; Attendance: 13,062; Referee: Graham Poll

26 February 2002 5R	Burnley	3–0	Fulham	Burnley, Lancashire
	Taylor 27'; Moore 35'; Diallo 52'	Report	Davis (red card) 49'	Stadium: Turf Moor; Attendance: 11,635; Referee: Phil Dowd

=== UEFA Intertoto Cup ===
6 July 2002 2 Leg 1	Fulham (England)	0–0	(Finland) Haka	London, England
15:00		Report		Stadium: Craven Cottage; Attendance: 7,908; Referee: Ladislav Gadosi

14 July 2002 2 Leg 2	Haka (Finland)	1–1	(England) Fulham	Valkeakoski, Finland
19:00	Ristilä 66'	Report	Marlet 47'	Stadium: Tehtaan Kenttä; Attendance: 3,500; Referee: Emil Laursen

20 July 2002 3 Leg 1	Fulham (England)	1–0	(Greece) Egaleo	London, England
17:00	Saha 77'	Report		Stadium: Craven Cottage; Attendance: 5,199; Referee: Ver Eecke

27 July 2002 3 Leg 2	Egaleo (Greece)	1–1	(England) Fulham	Athens, Greece
21:00	Chloros 24'	Report	Marlet 34'	Stadium: Leoforos Alexandras Stadium; Attendance: 2,500; Referee: Ruud Bossen

31 July 2002 Semi-final; Leg 1	Fulham (England)	1–0	(France) Sochaux	London, England
19:45	Davis 90+2'	Report		Stadium: Loftus Road; Attendance: 4,717; Referee: Sorin Corpodean

7 August 2002 Semi-final; Leg 2	Sochaux (France)	0–2	(England) Fulham	Montbéliard, France
21:30		Report	Legwinski 64'; Hayles 72'	Stadium: Stade Auguste Bonal; Attendance: 11,000; Referee: Franz-Xaver Wack

13 August 2002 Final; Leg 1	Bologna (Italy)	2–2	(England) Fulham	Bologna, Italy
20:30	Signori 53' (pen.), 76' (pen.)	Report	Inamoto 63'; Legwinski 87'	Stadium: Stadio Renato Dall'Ara; Attendance: 23,620; Referee: Eduardo Iturralde González

27 August 2002 Final; Leg 2	Fulham (England)	3–1	(Italy) Bologna	London, England
19:30	Inamoto 12', 47', 50'	Report	Locatelli 34'	Stadium: Loftus Road; Attendance: 13,756; Referee: Massimo Busacca

=== UEFA Cup ===
19 September 2002 1 Leg 1	Hajduk Split (Croatia)	0–1	(England) Fulham	Split, Croatia
		Report	Malbranque 50'	Stadium: Poljud Stadium; Attendance: 25,000; Referee: Fernando Carmona Mendez

3 October 2002 1 Leg 2	Fulham (England)	2–2	(Croatia) Hajduk Split	London, England
	Marlet 24'; Malbranque 44'	(Report)		Stadium: Loftus Road; Attendance: 18,500; Referee: Stefano Farina

31 October 2002 2 Leg 1	Dinamo Zagreb (Croatia)	0–3	(England) Fulham	Zagreb, Croatia
	Polovanec (red card)	Report	Boa Morte 35'; Marlet 59'; Hayles 77'	Stadium: Maksimir Stadium; Attendance: 30,000; Referee: Eduardo Iturralde González

14 November 2002 2 Leg 2	Fulham (England)	2–1	(Croatia) Dinamo Zagreb	London, England
	Malbranque 89'; Boa Morte 90'	Report	Olić 52'	Stadium: Loftus Road; Attendance: 7,700; Referee: Laurent Duhamel

26 November 2002 3 Leg 1	Hertha BSC (Germany)	2–1	(England) Fulham	Berlin, Germany
	Beinlich 26'; Sava 68' (o.g.)	Report	Marlet 53'	Stadium: Olympiastadion; Attendance: 14,477; Referee: Dick Van Egmond

12 December 2002 3 Leg 2	Fulham (England)	0–0	(Germany) Hertha BSC	London, England
		Report		Stadium: Loftus Road; Attendance: 15,161; Referee: Pierluigi Collina

== Statistics ==
=== Appearances and goals ===
No.	Pos	Nat	Player	Total		Premier League		FA Cup		League Cup		Continental	
No.	Pos	Nat	Player	Apps	Goals	Apps	Goals	Apps	Goals	Apps	Goals	Apps	Goals
Goalkeepers
1	GK	(Netherlands) NED	Edwin van der Sar	30	0	19	0	0	0	0	0	11	0
12	GK	(Northern Ireland) NIR	Maik Taylor	28	0	18+1	0	4	0	2	0	3	0
21	GK	(Argentina) ARG	Martín Herrera	2	0	1+1	0	0	0	0	0	0	0
Defenders
2	DF	(Republic of Ireland) IRL	Steve Finnan	41	0	32	0	3	0	1	0	5	0
4	DF	(Wales) WAL	Andy Melville	40	0	24+2	0	3	0	1	0	10	0
16	DF	(England) ENG	Zat Knight	24	0	12+5	0	0+1	0	1	0	3+2	0
17	DF	(France) FRA	Martin Djetou	35	1	22+3	1	4	0	1+1	0	3+1	0
24	DF	(France) FRA	Alain Goma	45	0	29	0	3	0	0	0	13	0
25	DF	(Morocco) MAR	Abdeslam Ouaddou	26	0	9+4	0	0+1	0	2	0	10	0
26	DF	(England) ENG	Jon Harley	19	1	11	1	4	0	0	0	4	0
27	DF	(Cameroon) CMR	Pierre Womé	19	1	13+1	1	0+1	0	2	0	1+1	0
36	DF	(England) ENG	Mark Hudson	1	0	0	0	0	0	0+1	0	0	0
39	DF	(England) ENG	Dean Leacock	1	0	0	0	0	0	1	0	0	0
Midfielders
6	MF	(Japan) JPN	Junichi Inamoto	33	6	9+10	2	1+1	0	2	0	3+7	4
8	MF	(England) ENG	Lee Clark	15	3	9+2	2	0	0	2	1	1+1	0
10	MF	(Scotland) SCO	John Collins	12	0	0+5	0	0+1	0	2	0	3+1	0
11	MF	(Portugal) POR	Luís Boa Morte	45	5	25+4	2	2	0	0+1	1	10+3	2
14	MF	(France) FRA	Steed Malbranque	55	13	35+2	6	4	4	0	0	12+2	3
18	MF	(France) FRA	Sylvain Legwinski	51	8	33+2	4	3+1	2	0	0	10+2	2
19	MF	(Denmark) DEN	Bjarne Goldbæk	20	1	8+2	0	2+1	1	1	0	2+4	0
23	MF	(England) ENG	Sean Davis	45	4	28	3	4	0	0+1	0	12	1
40	MF	(Latvia) LAT	Andrejs Štolcers	9	2	0+5	0	0	0	2	2	0+2	0
Forwards
7	FW	(France) FRA	Steve Marlet	44	9	28	4	1+1	0	0	0	13+1	5
9	FW	(Argentina) ARG	Facundo Sava	33	6	13+7	5	3+1	1	1+1	0	6+1	0
15	FW	(England) ENG	Barry Hayles	24	3	4+10	1	0	0	1	0	2+7	2
20	FW	(France) FRA	Louis Saha	28	7	13+4	5	3	1	0	0	5+3	1
33	FW	(England) ENG	Calum Willock	2	0	0+2	0	0	0	0	0	0	0
34	FW	(Ghana) GHA	Elvis Hammond	10	0	3+7	0	0	0	0	0	0	0
Players transferred out during the season
3	DF	(England) ENG	Rufus Brevett	30	0	20	0	0	0	0	0	10	0

Last updated: 30 May 2003
Source: Competitions
