= Frank Osborne (footballer) =

Footballer (1896–1988)

Personal information
- Full name: Frank Raymond Osborne
- Date of birth: 14 October 1896
- Place of birth: Wynberg, Cape Colony
- Date of death: 8 March 1988 (aged 91)
- Place of death: Epsom, England
- Height: 5 ft 11 in (1.80 m)
- Position: Centre-forward

Youth career
- 1911–1914: Netley

Senior career*
Years	Team	Apps	(Gls)
1919–1921	Bromley		
1921–1924	Fulham	67	(18)
1924–1931	Tottenham Hotspur	210	(78)
1931–1933	Southampton	17	(0)

International career
1922–1926	England	4	(3)

Managerial career
- 1948–1949: Fulham
- 1953–1956: Fulham
- * Club domestic league appearances and goals

Frank Raymond Osborne (14 October 1896 – 8 March 1988) was a professional footballer. He was one of the top forwards of the 1920s, playing for Tottenham Hotspur. Born in South Africa, he made four appearances for England. He subsequently went on to manage Fulham with whom he was associated for over 50 years.

== Playing career ==
=== Fulham ===
Osborne was born in Wynberg, Cape Colony and moved to England in 1911. He played youth football at Netley, near Southampton. He subsequently moved to London, joining Bromley (then a Kent amateur side) after the end of World War I, before he was signed by Phil Kelso for Football League Second Division side Fulham in November 1921 (aged 25).

At Fulham, playing alongside Andy Ducat and Frank Penn, he was top scorer in 1922–23 accounting for 10 of the team's 43 league goals, in what was generally a low-scoring season in Division Two. His goal-scoring exploits in a weak Fulham side brought him to the notice of the England selectors who picked him for the matches against Northern Ireland on 21 October 1922 (won 2–0) and France on 10 May 1923 (won 4–1), although he failed to score in either match. He thus became the first Fulham player to be capped by England.

Financial pressures led to his transfer to Football League First Division side Tottenham Hotspur for £1,500 in January 1924. Osborne spent two years at Fulham, making 70 appearances and scoring 18 goals.

=== Tottenham Hotspur ===
He made a slow start to his Tottenham career, scoring only once in his first season and a half, although he was again selected for England against Belgium on 8 December 1924 (won 4–0). In 1925–26 however, playing alongside Jimmy Dimmock and Jack Elkes, he struck a rich vein of form scoring three hat tricks in the space of two weeks in October/November 1925, finishing the season as the club's top scorer on 25 goals.

On 24 May 1926, he was again selected for the England match in Antwerp against Belgium where he finally brought his goal-scoring talents to the national stage, scoring a hat-trick as England came from 3–2 down to take the match 5–3.

In 1928, despite Osborne's 18 goals, Spurs were relegated to the Second Division. In the first season in the lower division Spurs continued to struggle, finishing in mid-table with Osborne again top-scorer on 16. In June 1931, he was sold to fellow Second Division side Southampton for a fee of £450, surprisingly large for a player now in his mid-30s. In his Spurs career he played a total of 220 matches, scoring 82 goals.

=== Southampton ===
He was unable to reproduce his goal-scoring form at The Dell, failing to score either in the league or cup. In May 1932, the club were suffering serious financial problems and Osborne was placed on the transfer list as manager George Kay attempted to trim the wages bill, as Osborne's "wages of £8 in the winter and £6 in the summer were considered to be too extravagant". At this stage Osborne contemplated retirement, but remained at The Dell for a further season before returning to London in 1933 to work as a sales representative for Fulham chairman John Dean's company in Putney. In his brief Saints career he made twenty appearances, failing to score.

== Director and manager ==
In March 1935, he was invited to join Fulham's board of directors, after special dispensation from the Football Association, thus beginning an involvement with the club that would continue, in various roles, right up to his death over fifty years later.

When manager Jack Peart died in September 1948, the board offered the position to Frank Osborne, who reluctantly accepted. From 1948 until his retirement in November 1964 at the age of 68, Osborne had some managerial responsibility at the Cottage, either solely or with a team manager, whilst he became general manager or secretary manager.

Osborne's career was exceptionally long, matched only by that of his former teammate and later trainer, Frank Penn.Penn made his debut two years earlier than Osborne and retired about six months later.

Although a player of some renown in his day, Osborne was not a track-suited manager. Intensely superstitious and fond of practising his golf swing in his Cottage office, he steered Fulham to the Second Division title in his first season, with the assistance of team manager Eddie Perry.

For the next four seasons, Osborne was the general manager and assumed responsibilities for the team again in 1953 for another couple of years until the next team manager was appointed. Whilst he was not necessary in charge of team affairs, Osborne was the key figure at Craven Cottage throughout the post-war period right up to his retirement.

Once he left, he never returned, and lived quietly at his Epsom home until his death at the age of 91 in March 1988.

== Personal life ==
Frank had two brothers who also played in the Football League. Harold made one appearance for Norwich City whilst Reg was a left-back with Leicester City, who made one England appearance in 1927.

== Career statistics ==
=== International ===
Appearances and goals by national team and year
National team	Year	Apps	Goals
England	1922	1	0
England	1923	1	0
England	1924	1	0
England	1926	1	3
Total		4	3

As of match played 16 January 2023

Wales score listed first, score column indicates score after each Osborne goal

List of international goals scored by Frank Osborne
No.	Date	Venue	Cap	Opponent	Score	Result	Competition	Ref.
1	24 May 1926	Olympisch Stadion, Antwerp, Belgium	4	Belgium	1–0	5–3	Friendly	
2	24 May 1926	Olympisch Stadion, Antwerp, Belgium	4	Belgium	3–3	5–3	Friendly	
3	24 May 1926	Olympisch Stadion, Antwerp, Belgium	4	Belgium	4–3	5–3	Friendly	

== Honours ==
=== As a manager ===
Fulham

- Football League Second Division: 1948–49
