= Luís Boa Morte =

Portuguese football coach and former player

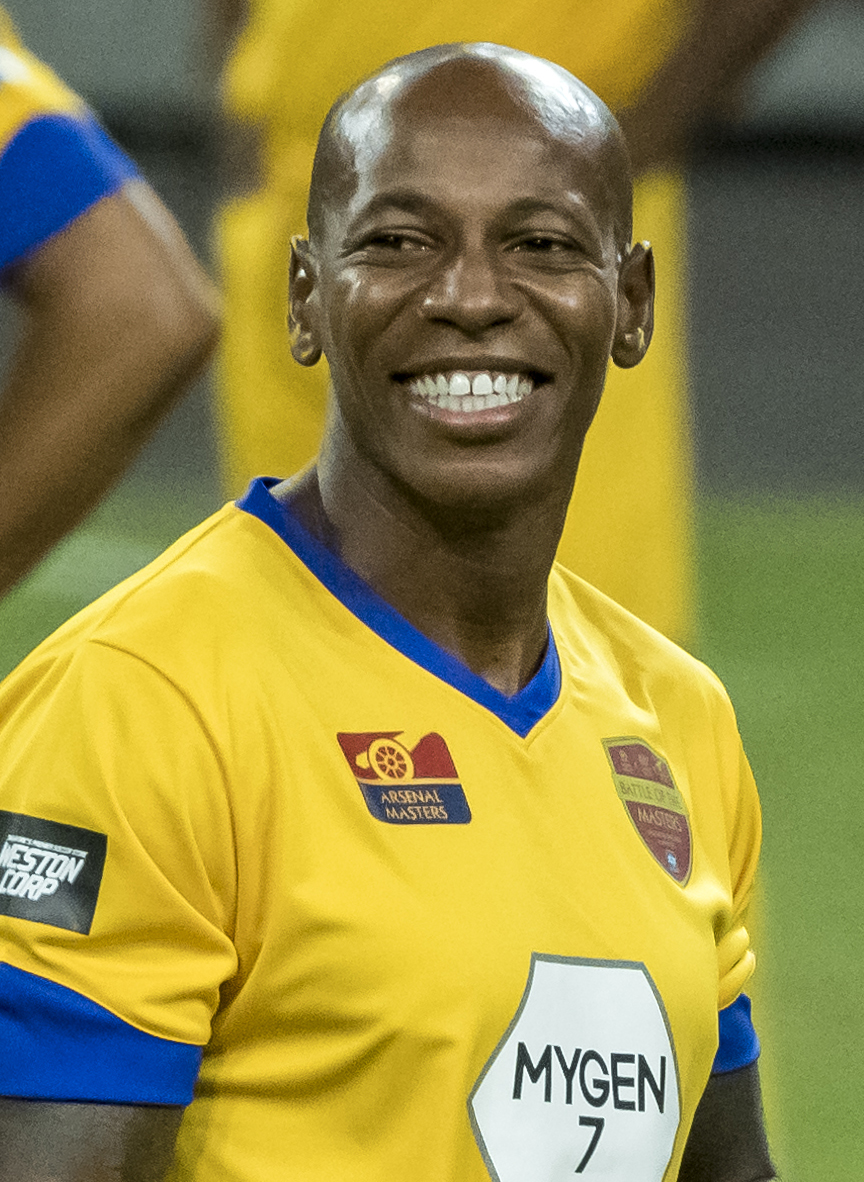
- Boa Morte playing a friendly in 2017

Personal information
- Full name: Luís Boa Morte Pereira
- Date of birth: 4 August 1977 (age 49)
- Place of birth: Lisbon, Portugal
- Height: 1.78 m (5 ft 10 in)
- Positions: Winger; midfielder

Team information
- Current team: (assistant coach)

Youth career
- 1994–1996: Sporting CP

Senior career*
Years	Team	Apps	(Gls)
1996–1997	Sporting CP	0	(0)
1996–1997	→ Lourinhanense (loan)		
1997–1999	Arsenal	25	(0)
1999–2001	Southampton	14	(1)
2000–2001	→ Fulham (loan)	39	(18)
2001–2007	Fulham	166	(26)
2007–2011	West Ham United	91	(2)
2011–2012	AEL	7	(0)
2012	Orlando Pirates	3	(0)
2012–2013	Chesterfield	12	(0)
Total		357	(47)

International career
2004	Portugal Olympic (O.P.)	1	(0)
2001–2009	Portugal	28	(1)

Managerial career
- 2017: Sintrense
- 2024–2025: Guinea-Bissau
- * Club domestic league appearances and goals

Luís Boa Morte Pereira (Portuguese pronunciation: [luˈiʒ ˈβoɐ ˈmɔɾtɨ]; born 4 August 1977) is a Portuguese football coach and a former professional football player who played as an attacking winger, forward and centre midfielder.

Having come through the youth ranks with Sporting CP, Boa Morte joined Premier League side Arsenal in 1997. He went on to play in England's top flight for Southampton, Fulham and West Ham United. He was released in 2011 and joined Greek side AEL before moving on to South African club Orlando Pirates. In October 2012, he returned to England and joined fourth-tier side Chesterfield.

Part of the Portugal national team from 2001 to 2009, Boa Morte earned 28 caps for Portugal. He was selected for the 2004 Olympics and the 2006 FIFA World Cup.

== Club career ==
=== Sporting CP ===
Born in Lisbon to parents from São Tomé and Príncipe, Boa Morte started his professional career with Sporting CP.

=== Arsenal ===
Boa Morte made his debut in English football for Arsenal when he became one of Arsène Wenger's first signings for the club, joining for a fee of £1.75 million.

He made his debut on 23 August 1997 as a substitute against Southampton. During Arsenal's double winning 1997–98 season, he made 15 league appearances, mostly as substitute and four in the FA Cup, although he did not appear in the final itself. He scored two goals this season, with both coming in a League Cup tie against Birmingham City.

The following season, he was a fairly regular squad member, usually as substitute in the early part of the season, with a few European Cup appearances, including against Panathinaikos on 9 December 1998, when he scored Arsenal's third goal. His fourth and final Arsenal goal came against Preston North End in the FA Cup. He came on as a substitute as Arsenal won the 1999 FA Charity Shield. His final appearance for Arsenal was as a second-half substitute away to Sunderland on 14 August 1999.

=== Southampton ===
In his season at The Dell, he made a total of 17 appearances, mostly as substitute, with one goal – a thundering left foot drive at Watford in a 2–3 defeat on 28 December 1999.

=== Fulham ===
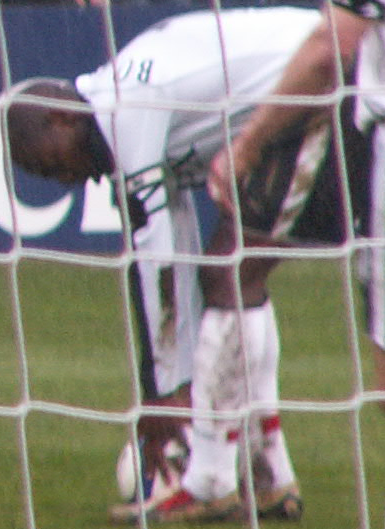
Boa Morte in action for Fulham

In his first season at Fulham, he helped Jean Tigana's side win the 2000–01 Division 1 title, making 39 league appearances and scoring 18 goals as Fulham ran away with the Championship with a total of 101 points. His contributions to the championship-winning season resulted in him being signed permanently in June 2001 (on a fee of £1.7 million paid to Arsenal), despite Southampton's attempts to bring him back after the expiry of the loan arrangement.

In Fulham's first two seasons in the Premiership, he was not able to replicate his form of the Championship-winning season, scoring only three goals, although his form returned to some extent in 2003–04, since when he averaged eight goals per season. He gave away all of his kit to the fans on the last game of the season, including his shorts. He was also voted Player of the Season for 2004–05 and got the nickname Dead Snake as a joking mistranslation of his surname.

Boa Morte accused Everton forward Duncan Ferguson of racial abuse after an FA Cup fourth round match in January 2004. The accusation was dismissed by the Football Association, who found insufficient evidence.

In August 2005, Boa Morte was made team captain. On 19 March 2006, he scored the only goal in the 1–0 win over league leaders and reigning champions Chelsea in the West London derby at Craven Cottage; it was Fulham's first win over their neighbours since 1979.

He became a favourite amongst Fulham's supporters whilst he played for them, for his impassioned, never-say-die and sometimes aggressive style of play – although this led to problems with referees. Even though his form dipped towards the end of his Fulham career, he was considered something of a cult hero there due to his ability to take players on, his ability to "cause panic like an unpinned grenade in the opposition ranks", and his "emotional character, a trait that strengthened the bond between him and the fans".

=== West Ham United ===
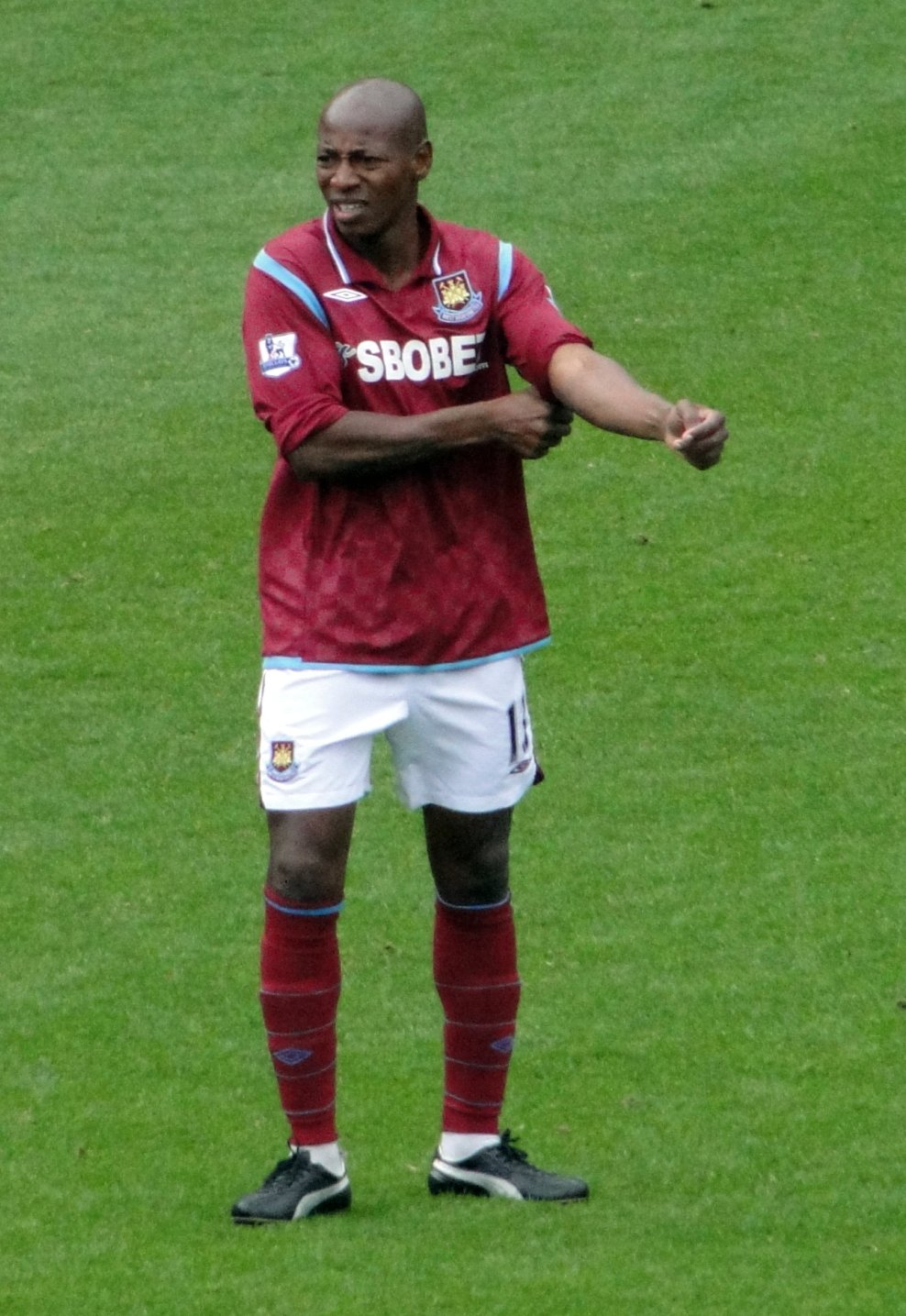
Boa Morte with West Ham in 2010

Boa Morte signed for West Ham United in January 2007 on a three-and-a-half-year contract for an undisclosed fee, which was believed to be around £5 million.

He played his first game for the Hammers in an FA Cup tie against Brighton & Hove Albion, setting up two goals and on 13 January 2007 in the Premier League against former team Fulham. On 28 April 2007, he scored his first goal for the club in an important 3–0 win against Wigan Athletic at the JJB Stadium. On 29 July 2009, Boa Morte picked up a serious injury in the pre-season friendly against Tottenham Hotspur. West Ham were playing in the Premier League Asia Trophy in Beijing when Boa Morte got his studs stuck in the ground, twisted his knee and suffered an anterior cruciate ligament injury. Boa Morte made his comeback from injury on 13 April 2010, playing 45 minutes in a reserve team 4–1 defeat by Wolves reserves. Making an appearance in the first team for the first time since the end of 2008–09 season he opened the scoring for West Ham against Manchester City in a 1–1 draw on 9 May 2010. It was his first goal for West Ham for over three years. In June 2010, West Ham Chairman David Sullivan announced that Boa Morte had been offered a new deal as his contract was due to finish at the end of the 2009–10 season. On 17 June 2010, Boa Morte signed a new two-year contract saying that he was looking forward to working with new West Ham manager, Avram Grant for the next two seasons. In August 2011 Boa Morte's contract with West Ham was cancelled by mutual consent.

=== AEL ===
In August 2011 Boa Morte signed a two-year contract with AEL. He thus rejoined former coach Chris Coleman whom he worked with over four years at Fulham. Luis Boa Morte signaled his intent to help Larissa back to top flight football in Greece. He provided his first assist in an impressive 3–0 away win over Veria on 20 November 2011. However, he left in January 2012, just six months into his stay, due to financial problems at the club. He was immediately linked with moves to South African Premier League sides Orlando Pirates and Kaizer Chiefs.

=== Orlando Pirates ===
On 24 January 2012, it was confirmed by Orlando Pirates boss Irvin Khoza that Boa Morte had signed an 18-month deal. He made only two starts for Pirates and left the club on 14 May.

Boa Morte joined Football League One team Portsmouth on trial on 27 September 2012, along with Ákos Buzsáky.

=== Chesterfield ===
On 10 October 2012, Boa Morte signed for League Two side Chesterfield. He commented "The most important thing for me now is to play football," and confirming the initial length of his contract added "I'll be here until the end of January but that doesn't mean I won't stay until the end of the season." The move followed a chance meeting with former Fulham teammate Mark Crossley who was a coach with the club. His contract was not renewed in January 2013 and he left the club.

In August 2013, Boa Morte joined Four Marks, ranked bottom in the Hampshire Premier League in the 11th tier of the English football league system. He knew their manager, who used to run security at Fulham.

== International career ==
Boa Morte made his debut for the Portugal national football team on 25 April 2001 in a friendly 4–0 defeat away to World and European champions France, as an 87th-minute substitute for Rui Jorge. His only goal came in a 5–1 home win against Angola on 14 November that year, a game which had to be abandoned when the African team were reduced to six players on the pitch.

Boa Morte was not selected by manager Luiz Felipe Scolari for UEFA Euro 2004. His former Fulham teammate Louis Saha publicly called the omission "revolting and scandalous", and advised Boa Morte never to play for Portugal again. Later that year, he was included in the under-23 team for the Olympic tournament in Greece in which they came bottom of their group. He was sent off early in the second half of a 4–2 loss to Iraq for a kick at Bassim Abbas, in a match that received widespread media coverage due to the ongoing war in the opponents' nation.

Boa Morte was part of Scolari's team that came fourth at the 2006 FIFA World Cup in Germany, playing ten minutes in place of captain Luís Figo at the end of a 2–1 win over Mexico in the final group game. After an absence of three years, he was recalled by Carlos Queiroz on 29 May 2009. He earned his first cap since 2006 on 6 June in a 2–1 win in Tirana against Albania in a 2010 World Cup qualifier. He made 27 appearances, scoring once, for Portugal from 2001 to 2009.

== Coaching career ==
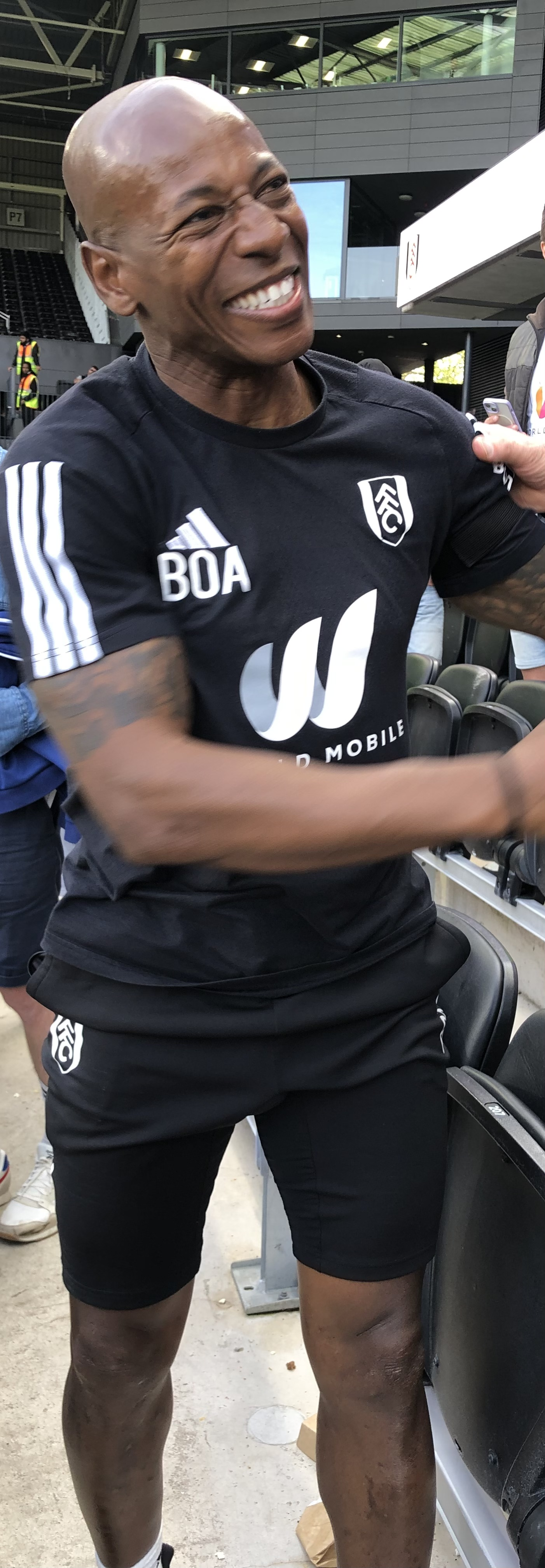
Boa Morte as Fulham first-team coach, 2024

After retiring, Boa Morte immediately spent time assisting the coaches at the Fulham academy. In the summer 2014, Boa Morte was appointed assistant manager of Sporting CP B, the reserve team of Sporting CP. After three months, he was appointed manager of the club's U19s. He was in charge until the end of the season, where he moved to Arsenal and worked as a scout. He left Arsenal in February 2017, to become manager of Sintrense.

In June 2018, he was appointed manager of Portimonense's U23 squad. He left the position to become assistant manager of Maccabi Haifa on 15 January 2019.

In June 2019, Boa Morte was appointed as assistant manager to compatriot Marco Silva at Everton. He was sacked, along with Silva, in December.

Following Silva's appointment as manager at Fulham in July 2021, Boa Morte joined him as first team coach. On 19 March 2024, it was announced that Boa Morte would be leaving Fulham at the end of the season to take up the role as manager of Guinea-Bissau. His first game in charge, on 6 June 2024 resulted in a goalless draw against Ethiopia.

== Personal life ==
Boa Morte made a guest appearance as himself in a February 1999 episode of the BBC children's drama series Grange Hill, giving out prizes at a school sports day. He appeared on the MTV reality series Cribs, showing viewers a relatively modest detached house in Surrey and his Vauxhall Corsa; he said that he had never been in his own garden.

Boa Morte's nephew Aylton (born 1993) is also a professional footballer, playing as a winger.

== Career statistics ==
=== Club ===
Appearances and goals by club, season and competition
Club	Season	League			National cup		League cup		Continental		Total	
Club	Season	Division	Apps	Goals	Apps	Goals	Apps	Goals	Apps	Goals	Apps	Goals
Arsenal	1997–98	Premier League	15	0	4	0	1	2	1	0	21	2
Arsenal	1998–99	Premier League	8	0	1	1	2	0	3	1	14	2
Arsenal	1999–2000	Premier League	2	0	0	0	0	0	0	0	2	0
Arsenal	Total		25	0	5	1	3	2	4	1	37	4
Southampton	1999–2000	Premier League	14	1	1	0	2	0	0	0	17	1
Fulham (loan)	2000–01	First Division	39	18	1	0	6	3	0	0	46	21
Fulham	2001–02	Premier League	23	1	3	0	3	1	1	0	30	2
Fulham	2002–03	Premier League	29	2	2	0	1	1	11	2	43	5
Fulham	2003–04	Premier League	33	9	5	1	1	0	0	0	39	10
Fulham	2004–05	Premier League	31	8	5	1	3	0	0	0	39	9
Fulham	2005–06	Premier League	35	6	1	0	1	1	0	0	37	7
Fulham	2006–07	Premier League	15	0	0	0	0	0	0	0	15	0
Fulham	Total		166	26	16	2	9	3	12	2	203	33
West Ham United	2006–07	Premier League	14	1	2	0	0	0	0	0	16	1
West Ham United	2007–08	Premier League	27	0	1	0	4	0	0	0	32	0
West Ham United	2008–09	Premier League	27	0	3	0	2	0	0	0	32	0
West Ham United	2009–10	Premier League	1	1	0	0	0	0	0	0	1	1
West Ham United	2010–11	Premier League	22	0	2	0	4	0	0	0	28	0
West Ham United	Total		91	2	8	0	10	0	0	0	109	2
AEL	2011–12	Football League Greece	7	0	0	0	0	0	0	0	7	0
Orlando Pirates	2011–12	Premier Soccer League	3	0	0	0	0	0	0	0	3	0
Chesterfield	2012–13	League Two	12	0	1	0	0	0	0	0	13	0
Career total			357	47	32	3	29	8	16	3	435	61

=== International ===
Appearances and goals by national team and year
National team	Year	Apps	Goals
Portugal	2001	4	1
Portugal	2002	2	0
Portugal	2003	6	0
Portugal	2004	7	0
Portugal	2005	5	0
Portugal	2006	2	0
Portugal	2007	0	0
Portugal	2008	0	0
Portugal	2009	2	0
Total		28	1

Scores and results list Portugal's goal tally first, score column indicates score after each Boa Morte goal.

List of international goals scored by Luís Boa Morte
No.	Date	Venue	Opponent	Score	Result	Competition
1	14 November 2001	Estádio José Alvalade, Lisbon, Portugal	Angola	4–1	5–1	Friendly

=== Managerial record ===
As of match played 12 October 2025

Managerial record by team and tenure
Team	Nat	From	To	Record					Ref.
Team	Nat	From	To	G	W	D	L	Win %	Ref.
Guinea-Bissau		2024	present	18	2	5	11	11.11	
Career total				18	2	5	11	11.11	—

== Honours ==
Arsenal

- Premier League: 1997–98
- FA Charity Shield: 1998, 1999

Fulham

- Football League First Division: 2000–01
- UEFA Intertoto Cup: 2002

Orlando Pirates

- Premier Soccer League: 2011–12

Individual

- Fulham Player of the Year: 2004–05

== Orders ==
- Medal of Merit, Order of the Immaculate Conception of Vila Viçosa (House of Braganza)
