= Sean Davis (footballer, born 1979) =

English footballer

Personal information
- Full name: Sean Davis
- Date of birth: 20 September 1979 (age 47)
- Place of birth: Clapham, England
- Height: 1.78 m (5 ft 10 in)
- Position: Midfielder

Youth career
- 1993-1994: Wimbledon
- 1994: West Ham United
- 1994: Battersea Sports Centre
- 1994–1996: Fulham

Senior career*
Years	Team	Apps	(Gls)
1996–2004	Fulham	155	(14)
2004–2006	Tottenham Hotspur	15	(0)
2006–2009	Portsmouth	102	(2)
2009–2012	Bolton Wanderers	3	(0)
2012	→ Bristol City (loan)	3	(0)
Total		278	(16)

International career
2000–2002	England U21	12	(1)
- * Club domestic league appearances and goals

Sean Davis (born 20 September 1979) is an English former professional footballer who played as a midfielder.

He made his professional debut for Fulham in 1996 and went on to make over 150 league appearances for the club. He joined Tottenham Hotspur in 2004. In January 2006, he signed for Portsmouth, helping them avoid relegation and then win the FA Cup in 2008. He moved on a free transfer to Bolton Wanderers in 2009, and following a loan to Bristol City and relegation from the Premier League, retired in 2012. He was called up for England in 2003, but did not play.

== Club career ==
=== Fulham ===
Born in Clapham, London, Davis attended Ernest Bevin College in Tooting.

Davis is a product of the Fulham youth system. He is one of the few players to have played at all four professional levels of football in England with the same club and is also the only Fulham player to achieve this.

He made his first-team debut for Fulham aged just 17 years and 25 days in 1996. Davis progressed under managers Keegan, Jean Tigana and later Chris Coleman. At the end of the 2002–03 season, Davis was named as the Player of the Season.

He attracted interest from Everton and Middlesbrough during that season, more so after he had handed in a transfer request citing his "ambition to further his career". However, Fulham were reluctant to sell Davis until they had found a suitable replacement. A transfer to either Everton or Middlesbrough never occurred as Davis was injured during the summer and unable to pass a medical to switch clubs, so this kept him at Fulham for the 2003–04 season. Davis sustained a knee injury in a pre-season friendly match against ASK Voitsberg As a result of his sustained injury, his proposed move to Everton was broken down.

After a month out injured, Davis made his return in the reserve match against Watford on 8 October 2003. A month later, Davis withdrew his transfer request, as he dedicated to Fulham by starting negotiations to sign a new contract. In an exclusive interview with the club, Davis says his attempted move in the summer transfer window resulted in fans questioning his commitment to Fulham. Davis is the only player in the Club's history to have represented Fulham in all four divisions.

=== Tottenham Hotspur ===
Davis signed for Tottenham Hotspur prior to the 2004–05 season. After starting early season games, injuries restricted his appearances.

=== Portsmouth ===
He was unable to break into the Tottenham team and was later bought by Harry Redknapp in the January 2006 transfer window in a combined deal estimated at £7 million which saw Davis and fellow Tottenham fringe players Pedro Mendes and Noé Pamarot sign for Portsmouth. While arriving at the club short of match fitness, he played an important part in Portsmouth's 2006 survival campaign, including scoring the second goal in their 4–2 win over West Ham United on 18 March 2006.

At the end of the 2005–06 campaign, Davis stated that Portsmouth supporters had yet to see his best form, and expected that after having taken part in a full pre-season, that he would be much more prepared to play a greater role in the coming season.

Davis was part of Portsmouth's 2007–08 FA Cup-winning team. Despite not making the squad for the final he appeared in the earlier rounds, including the semi-final.

On 1 February 2009, Portsmouth rejected a bid in the region of £3 million for Davis from Bolton Wanderers. Pompey manager Tony Adams was keen to secure the player to a new contract with his present deal due to run until the summer of 2009.

=== Bolton Wanderers ===
On 1 July 2009, Bolton confirmed the signing of Davis on a free transfer on a three-year deal. He made his debut in a 1–0 loss to Sunderland on 15 August but made only three more appearances after two major injuries, his last appearance, against Liverpool on 29 August 2009, bringing him the first red card of the 2009–10 Premier League. Davis played for the first time in 27 months on 13 December 2011 when playing the first 45 minutes for the reserve team in a 1–1 draw against Newcastle reserves.

On 24 February 2012, Davis joined Bristol City on a one-month loan deal and made his debut the day after in their 3–1 home defeat to Blackpool, picking up a booking. At the conclusion of the month he returned to Bolton after playing just three games and picking up another injury.

He was released at the end of the 2011–12 season following Bolton's relegation from the Premier League and announced his retirement from football on 25 September.

== International career ==
After a 2002–03 campaign in which he firmly established his position in the Fulham starting line up Davis was called up to be part of the England squad that faced Australia, although he did not play.

== Personal life ==
During his time at Portsmouth, due to the influence of teammate Linvoy Primus and the Faith and Football organisation, Davis converted to Christianity.

Since retiring, Davis has returned to Fulham as a columnist and commentator for their home matches.

== Career statistics ==
Appearances and goals by club, season and competition
Club	Season	League			FA Cup		EFL Cup		Other		Total	
Club	Season	Division	Apps	Goals	Apps	Goals	Apps	Goals	Apps	Goals	Apps	Goals
Fulham	1996–97	Third Division	1	0	0	0	0	0	0	0	1	0
Fulham	1997–98	Second Division	0	0	0	0	0	0	0	0	0	0
Fulham	1998–99	Second Division	6	0	1	0	2	0	0	0	9	0
Fulham	1999–2000	First Division	26	0	2	1	4	2	—		32	3
Fulham	2000–01	First Division	40	6	0	0	4	1	—		44	7
Fulham	2001–02	Premier League	30	0	4	0	3	0	—		37	0
Fulham	2002–03	Premier League	28	3	4	0	1	0	12 (Note: Eight appearances and one goal in UEFA Intertoto Cup, four in UEFA Cup)	1	45	4
Fulham	2003–04	Premier League	24	5	6	1	0	0	—		30	6
Fulham	Total		155	14	17	2	14	3	12	1	198	20
Tottenham Hotspur	2004–05	Premier League	15	0	0	0	1	0	—		16	0
Tottenham Hotspur	2005–06	Premier League	0	0	—		1	0	—		1	0
Tottenham Hotspur	Total		15	0	0	0	2	0	—		17	0
Portsmouth	2005–06	Premier League	17	1	1	1	—		—		18	2
Portsmouth	2006–07	Premier League	31	0	1	0	1	0	—		33	0
Portsmouth	2007–08	Premier League	22	0	2	0	1	0	—		25	0
Portsmouth	2008–09	Premier League	32	1	2	0	0	0	6 (Note: Appearances in UEFA Cup)	0	40	1
Portsmouth	Total		102	2	6	1	2	0	6	0	116	3
Bolton Wanderers	2009–10	Premier League	3	0	0	0	1	0	—		4	0
Bolton Wanderers	2010–11	Premier League	0	0	0	0	0	0	—		0	0
Bolton Wanderers	2011–12	Premier League	0	0	0	0	0	0	—		0	0
Bolton Wanderers	Total		3	0	0	0	1	0	—		4	0
Bristol City (loan)	2011–12	Championship	3	0	—		—		—		3	0
Career total			278	16	23	3	19	3	18	1	338	23

== Honours ==
Fulham

- Football League First Division: 2000–01
- UEFA Intertoto Cup: 2002

Individual

- PFA Team of the Year: 2000–01 First Division
