= Maik Taylor =

British footballer & coach (born 1971)

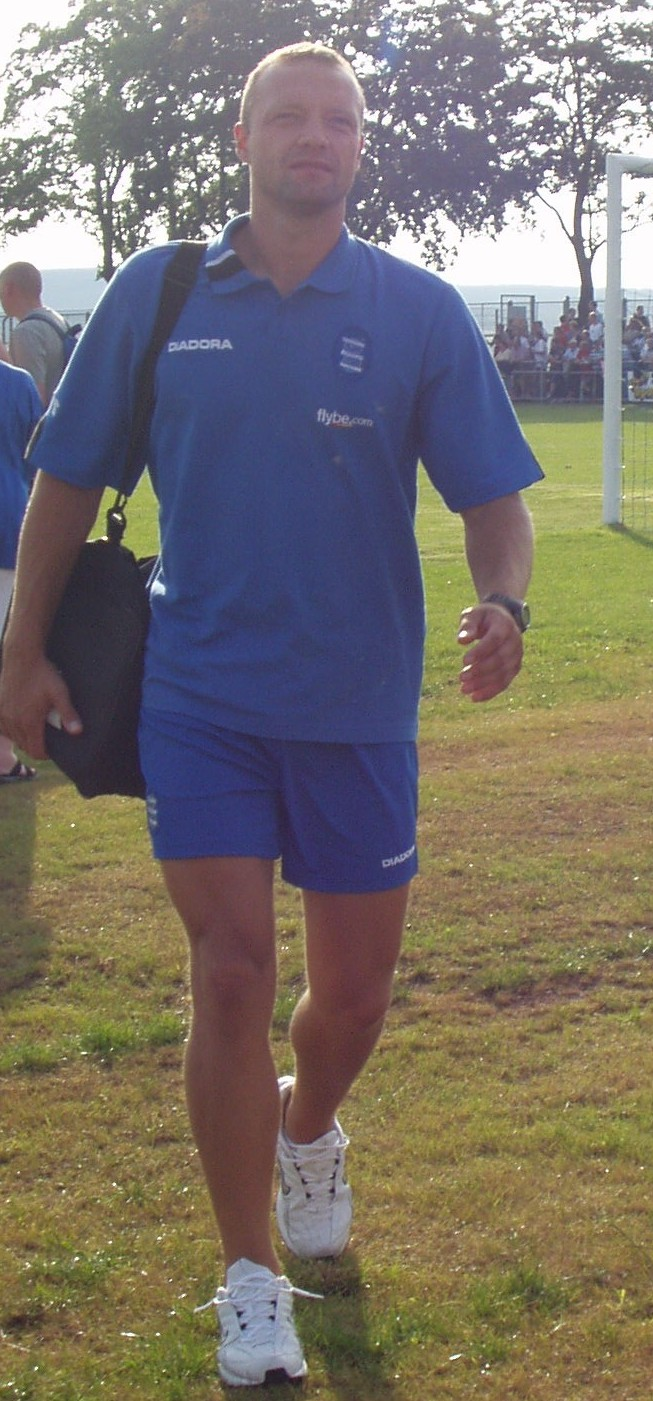
- Taylor during 2004 pre-season with Birmingham City

Personal information
- Full name: Maik Stefan Taylor
- Date of birth: 4 September 1971 (age 55)
- Place of birth: Hildesheim, West Germany
- Height: 6 ft 4 in (1.93 m)
- Position: Goalkeeper

Team information
- Current team: Birmingham City (goalkeeper coach)

Youth career
- 1985–1990: ASC Nienburg
- Princess Marina College

Senior career*
| Years | Team | Apps | (Gls) |
- Petersfield Town
- Basingstoke Town
| 1992–1995 | Farnborough Town | | |
| 1995–1997 | Barnet | 70 | (0) |
| 1997 | Southampton | 18 | (0) |
| 1997–2004 | Fulham | 189 | (0) |
| 2003–2004 | → Birmingham City (loan) | 27 | (0) |
| 2004–2011 | Birmingham City | 187 | (0) |
| 2011–2012 | Leeds United | 0 | (0) |
| 2012 | → Millwall (loan) | 10 | (0) |
| 2012–2013 | Millwall | 6 | (0) |
| Total | | 502 | (0) |

International career
| 1998 | Northern Ireland U21 | 1 | (0) |
| 1999 | Northern Ireland B | 1 | (0) |
| 1999–2011 | Northern Ireland | 88 | (0) |
- * Club domestic league appearances and goals

Maik Stefan Taylor (born 4 September 1971) is a former Northern Ireland international football goalkeeper and, since July 2022, goalkeeping coach at Birmingham City.

At club level, Taylor played non-League football for Petersfield Town, Basingstoke Town and Farnborough Town before moving into the Football League with Barnet. He went on to play for Southampton, Fulham, Birmingham City, where he spent eight years before his release at the end of the 2010–11 season, Leeds United and Millwall. In international football, he played for Northern Ireland, qualifying for that country through his British passport which at that time, as he was born abroad, entitled him to play for any of the Home Nations.

Taylor took up goalkeeper coaching, initially with the Northern Ireland setup. He was briefly goalkeeping coach at Bradford City in 2019, and then spent three years in that role with Walsall before moving on to Birmingham City in July 2022.

== Early life ==
Taylor was born in Hildesheim, West Germany, to a German mother and an English father who was serving as a staff sergeant in the Royal Electrical and Mechanical Engineers (REME) regiment of the British Army. Taylor began his football career at ASC Nienburg of Nienburg, Lower Saxony, in Germany before moving to England as a schoolboy. He later followed in his father's footsteps by joining the REME based at Arborfield in Berkshire, where he attended Princess Marina College.

He later moved to Bordon in Hampshire where he played football for his regiment and for the Army and Combined Services representative sides. During this period he also played for Petersfield Town, Basingstoke Town and Farnborough Town, with whom he won the Southern League Premier Division title in 1993–94.

== Club career ==
In June 1995, Taylor joined Barnet of the Football League Third Division for a fee of £700. Eighteen months later he was signed by Southampton of the Premier League for a fee of £500,000.

=== Southampton ===
Taylor had become a "Saints" fan as a schoolboy so when Graeme Souness brought him to The Dell in January 1997, no-one was more delighted than Taylor himself. Taylor immediately went into the first-team, replacing Dave Beasant, and made his debut on 11 January in a 1–0 victory at Middlesbrough. During his first season at Southampton, the team struggled near the foot of the table, avoiding relegation by one point, having been in last place with five matches to play.

Souness left the club in the summer of 1997, being replaced by Dave Jones who brought in several new players, including goalkeeper Paul Jones from his previous club, Stockport County. Taylor spent the rest of his time at Southampton on the bench and was sold to Fulham in November 1997.

=== Fulham ===
Taylor was bought by Fulham in 1997 from Southampton at a cost of £800,000. Fulham's manager Kevin Keegan rated him as the "best taker of a cross I've ever seen" and he proved to be a good signing for the Cottagers, helping them win the Second Division title in 1999. The First Division championship followed in 2001 and thus promotion to the Premier League.

Whilst at Craven Cottage, Taylor earned his first international cap for Northern Ireland in a 3–0 defeat by Germany on 27 March 1999. He went on to make over 80 appearances for his adopted country.

He was the first-choice goalkeeper at Craven Cottage until Fulham reached the Premier League, when manager Jean Tigana signed Edwin van der Sar, thus relegating Taylor to the bench. Taylor made only one Premier League appearance in 2001–02, but an injury to Van der Sar sustained at Newcastle United on 21 December 2002 ruled him out for several months, allowing Taylor to return to the side, and he retained his place for the remainder of the season.

=== Birmingham City ===
Taylor signed for Birmingham City in August 2003, initially on a year-long loan deal with the possibility of a permanent contract. Manager Steve Bruce made the contract permanent in March 2004 for a £1.5 million fee. Taylor continued his impressive form and was rewarded by being nominated as the goalkeeper for the Premiership team of the 2003–04 season.

Taylor was replaced as Birmingham's first choice goalkeeper in February 2007 by Colin Doyle, but regained his place after the first three matches of the 2007–08 Premier League season. He was again replaced as the first choice keeper in the 2009–10 Premier League season by loan signing Joe Hart, playing only the two fixtures against Hart's parent club, Manchester City. He spent the rest of the season on the bench.

In May 2010, Taylor signed a new one-year deal with Birmingham just after they had signed new keeper Ben Foster from Manchester United. He played only four matches in 2010–11, all in cup competitions, and was on the bench as Birmingham won the 2011 Football League Cup Final. He was not offered a new contract at the end of the season.

=== Final playing years ===
After training with the club for two weeks in November 2011, and saving a penalty in a friendly against a Chelsea XI, Taylor signed a short-term contract, until January 2012, with Championship club Leeds United. Taylor took his place on the bench behind loan goalkeeper Alex McCarthy two days later against Barnsley. His contract was extended until the end of the season, to act as backup for Andy Lonergan,

But in March, having made no appearances for Leeds and with new manager Neil Warnock preferring not to name a goalkeeper among the substitutes, Taylor agreed to move to fellow Championship club Millwall on loan for the remainder of the season. After a string of clean sheets, Taylor was nominated for the Championship player of the month award for April. After his six-month deal came to an end, Taylor was told he would be released by Leeds at the expiry of his contract. In May 2012, Taylor agreed a 12-month contract with Millwall, staying with them for one season before retiring.

== International career ==
Taylor was born in Germany to an English father and a German mother. As a British citizen who was born abroad, FIFA eligibility rules at the time of Taylor's first international selection entitled him to represent any of the constituent countries of the United Kingdom at international level. He opted for Northern Ireland, despite having no familial connection to that country.

Taylor made his debut for the Northern Ireland U21 team in April 1998 at the age of 27, as an over-age player in a 2-1 friendly victory over Switzerland. His senior debut was against Germany in 1999: Northern Ireland lost 3–0. In an August 2005 friendly Taylor saved an injury time penalty from Malta's George Mallia to keep the score at 1–1. He became a regular in the Northern Ireland national team, and played 88 matches, including the famous 1–0 victory over England in September 2005.

Taylor was replaced by Lee Camp as first choice goalkeeper, but was recalled to the Northern Ireland squad in August 2011 despite not being registered with a club since leaving Birmingham City. He made his 88th appearance for Northern Ireland on 11 October 2011, captaining his country in a 3–0 defeat away to Italy in a Euro 2012 qualifier. While working as the national goalkeeping coach, the 43-year-old Taylor made an emergency return to the squad in June 2015 as a back-up goalkeeper, following an injury to Roy Carroll the day before a Euro 2016 qualifier against Romania.

== Coaching career ==
In July 2013, Taylor – who had studied UEFA B Licence and UEFA A Licence, Part 1 – was hired as goalkeeping coach for the Northern Ireland national team.

On 8 March 2019, he agreed a short-term deal to become the goalkeeping coach at Bradford City until the end of the 2018–19 season. In June 2019 he left Bradford to take up a similar role at Walsall, and in July 2022, returned to Birmingham City as part of newly appointed head coach John Eustace's backroom staff.

== Career statistics ==
Appearances and goals by club, season and competition
| Club | Season | League | | | FA Cup | | League Cup | | Other | | Total | |
| Club | Season | Division | Apps | Goals | Apps | Goals | Apps | Goals | Apps | Goals | Apps | Goals |
|---|---|---|---|---|---|---|---|---|---|---|---|---|
| Barnet | 1995–96 | Third Division | 45 | 0 | 2 | 0 | 2 | 0 | 2 (Note: Appearances in Football League Trophy) | 0 | 51 | 0 |
| Barnet | 1996–97 | Third Division | 25 | 0 | 4 | 0 | 4 | 0 | — | | 33 | 0 |
| Barnet | Total | | 70 | 0 | 6 | 0 | 6 | 0 | 2 | 0 | 84 | 0 |
| Southampton | 1996–97 | Premier League | 18 | 0 | — | | — | | — | | 18 | 0 |
| Southampton | 1997–98 | Premier League | 0 | 0 | — | | 0 | 0 | — | | 0 | 0 |
| Southampton | Total | | 18 | 0 | — | | — | | — | | 18 | 0 |
| Fulham | 1997–98 | Second Division | 28 | 0 | 2 | 0 | — | | 3 (Note: One appearance in Football League Trophy, two in Football League play-offs) | 0 | 33 | 0 |
| Fulham | 1998–99 | Second Division | 46 | 0 | 7 | 0 | 5 | 0 | 0 | 0 | 58 | 0 |
| Fulham | 1999–2000 | First Division | 46 | 0 | 4 | 0 | 7 | 0 | — | | 57 | 0 |
| Fulham | 2000–01 | First Division | 44 | 0 | 1 | 0 | 5 | 0 | — | | 50 | 0 |
| Fulham | 2001–02 | Premier League | 1 | 0 | 2 | 0 | 3 | 0 | — | | 6 | 0 |
| Fulham | 2002–03 | Premier League | 19 | 0 | 4 | 0 | 2 | 0 | 3 (Note: Two appearances in UEFA Intertoto Cup, one in UEFA Cup) | 0 | 28 | 0 |
| Fulham | Total | | 184 | 0 | 20 | 0 | 22 | 0 | 6 | 0 | 232 | 0 |
| Birmingham City | 2003–04 | Premier League | 34 | 0 | 4 | 0 | 1 | 0 | — | | 39 | 0 |
| Birmingham City | 2004–05 | Premier League | 38 | 0 | 2 | 0 | 2 | 0 | — | | 42 | 0 |
| Birmingham City | 2005–06 | Premier League | 34 | 0 | 6 | 0 | 1 | 0 | — | | 41 | 0 |
| Birmingham City | 2006–07 | Championship | 27 | 0 | 3 | 0 | 1 | 0 | — | | 31 | 0 |
| Birmingham City | 2007–08 | Premier League | 34 | 0 | 1 | 0 | 0 | 0 | — | | 35 | 0 |
| Birmingham City | 2008–09 | Championship | 45 | 0 | 1 | 0 | 0 | 0 | — | | 46 | 0 |
| Birmingham City | 2009–10 | Premier League | 2 | 0 | 0 | 0 | 2 | 0 | — | | 4 | 0 |
| Birmingham City | 2010–11 | Premier League | 0 | 0 | 1 | 0 | 3 | 0 | — | | 4 | 0 |
| Birmingham City | Total | | 214 | 0 | 18 | 0 | 10 | 0 | — | | 242 | 0 |
| Leeds United | 2011–12 | Championship | 0 | 0 | 0 | 0 | — | | — | | 0 | 0 |
| Millwall (loan) | 2011–12 | Championship | 10 | 0 | — | | — | | — | | 10 | 0 |
| Millwall | 2012–13 | Championship | 6 | 0 | 0 | 0 | 1 | 0 | — | | 7 | 0 |
| Millwall | Total | | 16 | 0 | 0 | 0 | 1 | 0 | — | | 17 | 0 |
| Career total | | | 502 | 0 | 44 | 0 | 39 | 0 | 8 | 0 | 613 | 0 |

== Honours ==
Farnborough Town

- Southern League Premier Division: 1993–94

Fulham

- Football League Second Division: 1998–99
- Football League First Division: 2000–01
- UEFA Intertoto Cup: 2002

Birmingham City

- Football League Championship runner-up: 2006–07, 2008–09
- Football League Cup: 2010–11

Individual

- PFA Team of the Year: 1998–99 Football League Second Division, 2000–01 Football League First Division
