= Frank Penn (footballer) =

English footballer

Francis John Penn (5 April 1896 – 1966) was an English footballer and one-club man for Fulham. He joined the club in 1915 and, 19 years later played his last game for them in 1934, against West Ham United. By this time, he had played 460 times for the club, at the time a club record, which since then has only been surpassed by three players.

Penn was an outside left noted for his speed and crossing ability. He also contributed a number of goals to the club. After his retirement, he lent his physiotherapy skills to the club (he qualified as a physio while still playing), and worked for the club for a further 26 years, from 1939 to 1965. He was unlucky to never win a full England cap, having been picked for various wartime representative teams.

== Personal life ==
Penn was a qualified mechanical engineer and served in the Royal Air Force during the First World War.
