= Syd Thomas =

Welsh footballer (1919–2012)

Personal information
- Full name: David Sidney Thomas
- Date of birth: 12 November 1919
- Place of birth: Machynlleth, Wales
- Date of death: 19 January 2012 (aged 92)
- Place of death: Machynlleth, Wales
- Height: 5 ft 5 in (1.65 m)
- Position: Winger

Senior career*
Years	Team	Apps	(Gls)
1938–1950	Fulham	57	(4)
1950	Bristol City	13	(1)

International career
1947–1948	Wales	4	(0)
- * Club domestic league appearances and goals

David Sidney Thomas (12 November 1919 – 19 January 2012) was a Welsh professional footballer who played as a winger. After playing local amateur football as a teenager, he joined Fulham in 1938 after impressing in a trial match, however, due to the outbreak of World War Two, he did not make his professional debut until 1946.

He helped the side win promotion to the First Division in 1949 but left the club the following year to sign for Bristol City. However, he was forced to retire from football soon after having contracted tuberculosis.

== Career ==
Born in Machynlleth, Thomas worked in a local bakery as a teenager while playing amateur football for his local side alongside his two brothers Eric and Leslie, his performances being said to have "amazed" spectators. His reputation attracted the attention of Wrexham, where he played for the club's reserve side during the 1937–38 season but was not offered a contract. In August 1938, he was offered a trial with Second Division side Fulham after being recommended to the club by Bob McCormick, a goalkeeper also from Machynlleth who himself had spent time on trial with the club.

His performance in a trial match for Fulham impressed the club's manager Jack Peart so much that he signed Thomas to a professional contract during the half-time interval. However, he was forced to wait for his debut following the outbreak of World War Two, with the Football League suspended during the hostilities. During his war service, Thomas served as a driver in the RAF at a construction site in Sekondi-Takoradi in the African Gold Coast.

When the Football League resumed in 1946, Thomas made his professional debut for Fulham eight years after originally signing with the club, playing in a draw with Tottenham Hotspur in November 1946. During the 1947–48 season, he made 35 appearances in all competitions and his form saw him called up to make his senior international debut in a 3–0 defeat to England on 18 October 1947 at Ninian Park. His selection for the side attracted huge interest in his home village of Machynlleth and twelve buses of residents travelled to the match to see Thomas play. He played in Wales' three following fixtures but was displaced by Ernie Jones and never played for Wales again.

He helped Fulham to win the Second Division title the following season but featured infrequently for the club as Arthur Stevens was moved to Thomas' preferred position to accommodate new signing Arthur Rowley in the side. Thomas featured in three league matches following the club's promotion to the First Division and was eventually sold to Bristol City in June 1950 for a fee of £9000. However, he and his wife Ivy contracted tuberculosis soon after which led to Thomas' retirement from football.

== After football ==
Thomas returned home to Machynlleth following his retirement, working in his family's bakery until 1987. He died on 19 January 2012, aged 92.

== Honours ==
Fulham

- Football League Second Division winner: 1948–49
