= Chris Coleman (footballer) =

Welsh footballer and manager (born 1970)

Chris Coleman OBE
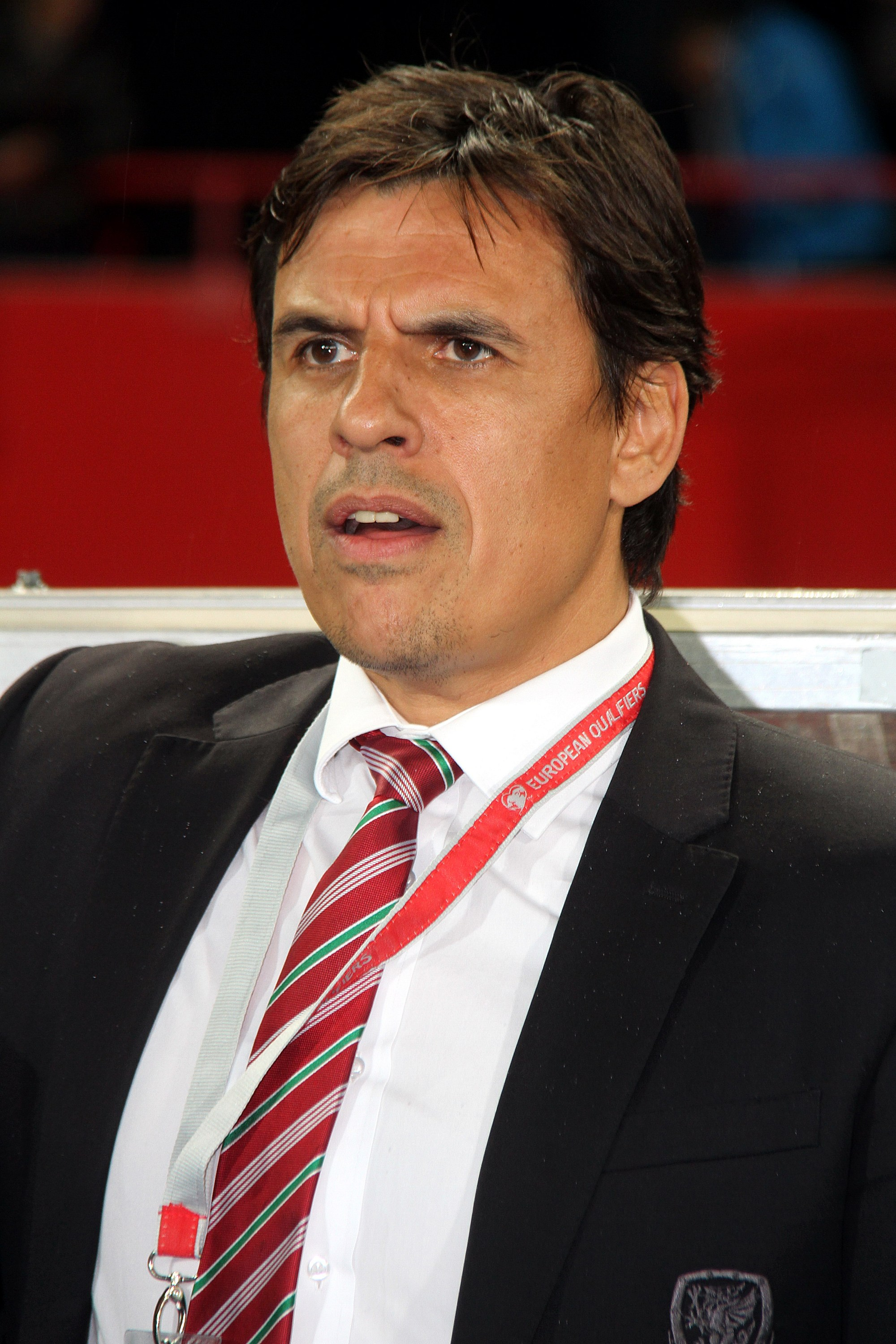
- Coleman as manager of Wales in 2016

Personal information
- Full name: Christopher Patrick Coleman
- Date of birth: 10 June 1970 (age 56)
- Place of birth: Swansea, Wales
- Height: 6 ft 2 in (1.88 m)
- Position: Centre-back

Youth career
- –1986: Manchester City

Senior career*
Years	Team	Apps	(Gls)
1986–1987	Manchester City	0	(0)
1987–1991	Swansea City	159	(2)
1991–1995	Crystal Palace	143	(13)
1995–1997	Blackburn Rovers	28	(0)
1997–2002	Fulham	140	(8)
Total		470	(23)

International career
1992–2002	Wales	32	(4)

Managerial career
- 2003–2007: Fulham
- 2007–2008: Real Sociedad
- 2008–2010: Coventry City
- 2011–2012: AEL
- 2012–2017: Wales
- 2017–2018: Sunderland
- 2018–2019: Hebei China Fortune
- 2022–2023: Atromitos
- 2024: AEL Limassol
- 2024–2025: OH Leuven
- 2025–2026: Asteras Tripolis
Medal record
Men's football
Representing Wales (as manager)
UEFA European Championship
Bronze medal – third place	2016
- * Club domestic league appearances and goals

Christopher Patrick Coleman OBE (born 10 June 1970) is a Welsh professional football coach and former player.

As a player, Coleman usually played in defence, while also occasionally appearing as a forward. He began his career at Manchester City, leaving as a teenager to make his debut for hometown team Swansea City in 1987. In 1991, he joined Crystal Palace, whom he represented in the Premier League. He spent a year-and-a-half at league champions Blackburn Rovers before signing for Fulham in 1997, helping the team to two promotions from the third tier to the top flight. He won 32 caps playing for Wales. Coleman's playing career ended at the age of 32, when his leg was broken in a car crash.

Coleman at the St David Awards in 2016

Following this, he started his coaching career at Fulham. In his first full season as manager, he guided the club to ninth place in the 2003–04 Premier League. After leaving Fulham, Coleman was appointed manager of Real Sociedad, where he resigned in January 2008 due to differences with the incoming president. He returned to England to manage Coventry City, but was dismissed in May 2010 following a poor run of results. Coleman then managed Greek side AEL for the first half of the 2011–12 season before resigning due to financial troubles at the club. In 2012, he took over as Wales national team manager after the death of Gary Speed, and led Wales to UEFA Euro 2016, their first major tournament since the 1958 FIFA World Cup, where they made the semi-finals.

== Early life ==
Coleman was born in Swansea. His Irish father was from Dublin.

Coleman was educated at St Joseph's Roman Catholic Primary School and Bishop Vaughan Catholic School. Coleman has been nicknamed "Cookie" since childhood, as friends likened his eating habits to the Cookie Monster from Sesame Street.

== Playing career ==
=== Club ===
==== Swansea City ====
The first professional team Coleman was contracted to was Manchester City, aged 16, although he later left them, citing homesickness as the major reason. He then joined his hometown club Swansea City.

He made his first professional appearance for them aged 17, in the autumn of 1987. He made nearly 200 appearances for the south Wales club and helped win the Welsh Cup in 1989 and 1991.

==== Crystal Palace ====
After spending four years with Swansea, Coleman was signed by Crystal Palace in 1991 for a transfer fee set by a Football League tribunal at around £270,000, plus a percentage of any future sale. After making 143 appearances, scoring 16 goals in that period – a 1 in 9 record explained by the fact that manager Steve Coppell often used Coleman as a makeshift centre forward. Palace finished 10th in Coleman's first season at Selhurst Park, but they were relegated from the new FA Premier League in his second season (although they did reach the semi-finals of the League Cup). They won promotion as Division One champions at the first attempt, but were relegated the following season. Coleman was sold to Blackburn Rovers. While at Palace, he was capped for Wales at senior level for the first time.

In 2005, Palace supporters voted Coleman into their Centenary XI.

==== Blackburn Rovers ====
Coleman joined Premier League champions Blackburn Rovers for a fee of £2.8 million. Blackburn did not retain the Premier League title they had won in 1995, and finished seventh, just missing out on a UEFA Cup place. Coleman made 28 league appearances over his season-and-a-half at the club, and when he often found himself out of the starting line-up (hampered by a persistent Achilles injury), he took the gamble to further his career by dropping two divisions to join Fulham.

==== Fulham ====
Fulham, at the time in the third tier, were financed by wealthy businessman Mohamed Al-Fayed, and were able to spend a record transfer fee for the division and club, of £2.1 million for Coleman in late 1997. He quickly became club captain, and led Fulham to promotion under manager Kevin Keegan in 1998–99 to the First Division.

He remained captain and a regular in the team under new manager Jean Tigana in the 2000–01 season as Fulham made a successful start to the campaign. However, Coleman's career was effectively ended midway through the season, after he broke his leg in a car crash near Bletchingley in Surrey on 2 January 2001, just days before an FA Cup tie against Manchester United. He never recovered from this injury despite playing a reserve fixture in March 2002, a game that only served as an indication that he would never again play at the highest level of English football. He announced his retirement as a player in October 2002, but stayed at the West London club as a member of the coaching staff.

=== International ===
Coleman was capped by Wales at school, youth, under-21 and senior levels. His only competitive football appearance after his leg injuries came for Wales on 14 May 2002, when he was called up to the squad as a replacement for Danny Gabbidon, and then came on as a late substitute for goalscorer Robert Earnshaw in a 1–0 win over Germany at the Millennium Stadium.

Coleman was also eligible to play for Ireland, through his father.

== Managerial career ==
=== Fulham ===
Coleman joined Fulham's coaching staff in October 2002 under Tigana. He later succeeded the Frenchman as caretaker manager in April 2003, and steered Fulham away from relegation danger. He was named as Fulham's permanent manager in May 2003, beating the more experienced Klaus Toppmöller and George Burley to the post, and also became the youngest manager in the Premier League.

His first full season in charge saw Fulham finish a surprise ninth place, as many pundits had predicted a season of struggle for the club. Many of Fulham's key players, such as Edwin van der Sar, Louis Saha, Steed Malbranque and Luís Boa Morte, were sold in the following years and Fulham did not repeat their earlier successes under Coleman though he kept them clear of relegation. He was dismissed on 10 April 2007 in a move that caught some observers by surprise, after a seven-game winless run that left the club four points above the relegation zone.

=== Real Sociedad ===
Coleman moved abroad to manage recently relegated Segunda División side Real Sociedad on 4 July 2007, after being recommended to the club by fellow Welshman and former Real Sociedad manager John Toshack. With the club in 5th place and having only lost once in its previous eleven games, Coleman resigned as manager on 16 January 2008, citing a divergence in vision for the club with newly elected President Iñaki Badiola.

=== Coventry City ===
Coleman was appointed manager of Championship club Coventry City on 19 February 2008, signing a three-and-a-half-year contract. He replaced Iain Dowie, who had been dismissed by new owner Ray Ranson.

On 26 August 2008, the BBC reported that Coleman was no longer interested in the Wales national team. He later said that his words had been misinterpreted; when answering a question on whether Coventry striker Freddy Eastwood was fit to play for Wales, he meant to say that he wanted Eastwood fit for club before returning to international duty. On 4 May 2010, Coleman was dismissed following Coventry's 19th-place finish during the 2009–10 season, their lowest league finish in more than 45 years.

=== AEL ===
On 26 May 2011, Coleman was appointed as manager of Greek side AEL. In January 2012, Coleman announced that because of financial troubles at the club he would be quitting from his position as manager.

=== Wales ===
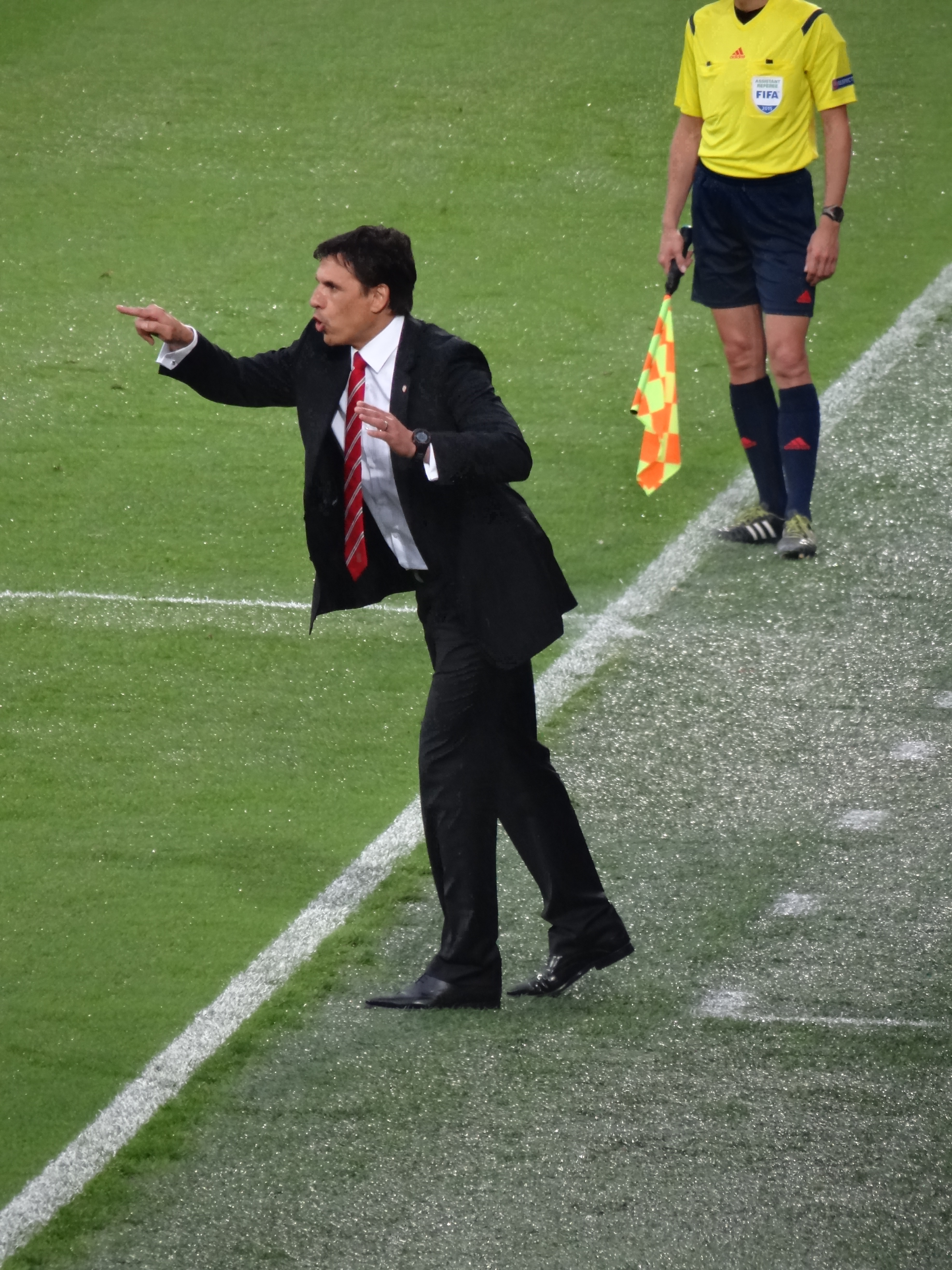
Coleman as manager of Wales in 2015

On 19 January 2012, Coleman was appointed team manager of the Wales national team, as successor to his friend Gary Speed, who had died the previous November. After letting his assistant Osian Roberts take charge in Speed's memorial match against Costa Rica in February, his first game in charge was a 2–0 defeat against Mexico at the MetLife Stadium in New Jersey on 27 May.

Wales' first match in 2014 FIFA World Cup qualification was on 7 September at home to Belgium, with centre back James Collins sent off for a late lunge on Guillaume Gillet in the 25th minute of an eventual 2–0 loss. Four days later in Novi Sad, the team lost 6–1 to Serbia; Coleman said in October 2015 that he considered leaving his post after the defeat. After becoming the first Welsh manager to lose his first five games, Coleman got his first win on 12 October 2012, a 2–1 victory against Scotland. On 26 March 2013, in a qualifier against Croatia at the Liberty Stadium, Wales led 1–0 for the majority of the game through a Gareth Bale penalty, but two late goals from the opponents ended any hopes of qualification.

In October 2015, Coleman led Wales to their best ever position on the FIFA World Rankings, 8th. On 10 October, their qualification for the UEFA Euro 2016 tournament was confirmed, a first tournament qualification since 1958. The team came first in their group in France, and eliminated Northern Ireland and Belgium to reach the semi-finals, losing to eventual champions Portugal. Coleman received interest from other teams due to his management of the Welsh team at the tournament.

On 23 May 2016, it was announced at a Football Association of Wales press conference that Coleman had signed a two-year contract extension to take in the 2018 World Cup qualifying campaign. Wales's 1–0 home loss to the Republic of Ireland on 9 October 2017 meant that they were eliminated from qualification. Coleman resigned as Wales manager on 17 November.

=== Sunderland ===
On 19 November 2017, Coleman was appointed as the new manager of under-performing Championship club Sunderland. He replaced the dismissed Simon Grayson, who had left the Black Cats third from bottom of the league table in twenty-second place and within the relegation drop zone. Coleman's first game in charge was a 2–1 defeat at Aston Villa, two days after his appointment. By the conclusion of 2017, Sunderland had collected eleven points, out of a possible twenty-four, under Coleman's guidance, briefly lifting out of the relegation zone into twenty-first place, following a satisfactory run of form.

During the winter transfer window, Coleman was informed that club chairman Ellis Short had refused to invest any more money into player transfers, with the American businessman announcing his intentions to sell the club. Joining the club for free of charge included the loan signings of Jake Clarke-Salter from Chelsea, Ovie Ejaria from Liverpool, Lee Camp from Cardiff City and Ashley Fletcher from fierce rivals Middlesbrough; Kazenga LuaLua was the only permanent transfer that window, joining from Brighton & Hove Albion on a free transfer.

After their transfer window nightmare, Sunderland went on a nine-game winless run, ending when they defeated Derby County 4–1 at Pride Park. This was Coleman's final victory in charge of Sunderland; his final six games saw the Black Cats record three draws and three defeats. Relegation to League One was confirmed following a 2–1 defeat against Burton Albion at the Stadium of Light. His final game in charge was a 2–1 defeat to Fulham. On 29 April 2018, Coleman was dismissed shortly following the club's sale.

=== Hebei China Fortune ===
On 10 June 2018, Coleman was appointed as the head coach of Chinese club Hebei China Fortune, as successor to Manuel Pellegrini, who left the side to return to the Premier League with West Ham United. The club had become notable during the year for completing the high-profile signing of Javier Mascherano from Spanish La Liga giants Barcelona. His side finished the 2018 Super League season in sixth position, two places and fourteen points adrift from qualification to the 2019 AFC Champions League.

Coleman's side struggled to adapt in the 2019 league campaign, with the club sat in fifteenth place, in the relegation zone, following nine games. Having only won one game that league season, a 2–1 victory over Shanghai Greenland Shenhua, he was dismissed on 15 May.

=== Later career ===
On 27 November 2024, Coleman was announced at OH Leuven. On 11 June 2025, he was sacked by OH Leuven.

== Personal life ==
He is married to TV presenter Charlotte Jackson. They had a son at the end of 2014. Coleman's godson is Republic of Ireland international Ronan Curtis, who plays as a forward for Plymouth Argyle.

In June 2010, Coleman worked as a commentator for ITV at the 2010 FIFA World Cup in South Africa. He has also worked as a commentator and pundit for Sky Sports. For Euro 2020, he worked for ESPN.

On 20 October 2016 he was awarded the Freedom of the City of Swansea. Coleman was appointed Officer of the Order of the British Empire (OBE) in the 2017 New Year Honours for services to football. In 2017, he was awarded an honorary degree from his hometown's University of Swansea, and fellowships at both Bangor University and University of Wales Trinity Saint David. In July 2017, he endorsed the Welsh Government's project to double the number of speakers of Welsh by 2050.

== Career statistics ==
Appearances and goals by club, season and competition
Club	Season	League			FA Cup		League Cup		Europe		Total	
Club	Season	Division	Apps	Goals	Apps	Goals	Apps	Goals	Apps	Goals	Apps	Goals
Swansea City	1987–88	Fourth Division	30	0	2	0	2	0	0	0	34	0
Swansea City	1988–89	Third Division	43	0	3	0	2	0	5	0	53	0
Swansea City	1989–90	Third Division	46	2	4	0	2	0	2	0	54	2
Swansea City	1990–91	Third Division	41	0	4	1	2	0	8	0	55	1
Crystal Palace	1991–92	First Division	18	4	1	0	5	0	0	0	24	4
Crystal Palace	1992–93	Premier League	38	5	1	0	7	2	0	0	46	7
Crystal Palace	1993–94	First Division	46	3	1	0	4	0	0	0	51	3
Crystal Palace	1994–95	Premier League	35	1	7	1	6	0	0	0	48	2
Crystal Palace	1995–96	First Division	17	0	2	0	2	0	0	0	21	0
Blackburn Rovers	1995–96	Premier League	20	0	0	0	0	0	0	0	20	0
Blackburn Rovers	1996–97	Premier League	8	0	0	0	1	0	0	0	9	0
Blackburn Rovers	1997–98	Premier League	0	0	0	0	1	0	0	0	1	0
Fulham	1997–98	Second Division	26	1	1	0	0	0	0	0	27	1
Fulham	1998–99	Second Division	45	4	7	0	5	1	0	0	57	5
Fulham	1999–2000	First Division	40	3	3	1	7	1	0	0	50	5
Fulham	2000–01	First Division	25	0	0	0	1	0	0	0	26	0
Fulham	2001–02	Premier League	0	0	0	0	0	0	0	0	0	0
Career total			478	23	36	3	48	4	15	0	576	30

== Managerial statistics ==
As of match played 11 January 2026

Managerial record by team and tenure
Team	From	To	Record					Ref
Team	From	To	P	W	D	L	Win %	Ref
Fulham	17 April 2003	10 April 2007	176	61	44	71	34.7	
Real Sociedad	4 July 2007	16 January 2008	21	8	7	6	38.1	
Coventry City	19 February 2008	4 May 2010	117	34	37	46	29.1	
AEL	26 May 2011	10 January 2012	12	6	4	2	50.0	
Wales	19 January 2012	17 November 2017	50	19	13	18	38.0	
Sunderland	19 November 2017	29 April 2018	29	5	8	16	17.2	
Hebei China Fortune	10 June 2018	15 May 2019	21	7	6	8	33.3	
Atromitos	7 January 2022	10 October 2023	60	16	21	23	26.7	
AEL Limassol	25 May 2024	27 November 2024	11	5	1	5	45.5	
OH Leuven	2 December 2024	11 June 2025	26	7	9	10	26.9	
Asteras Tripolis	7 October 2025	14 January 2026	13	3	5	5	23.1	
Total			536	171	155	210	31.9	—

== Honours ==
=== Player ===
Swansea City

- Football League Fourth Division play-offs: 1988
- Welsh Cup: 1988–89, 1990–91

Crystal Palace

- Football League First Division: 1993–94

Fulham

- Football League First Division: 2000–01
- Football League Second Division: 1998–99

Individual

- PFA Team of the Year: 1988–89 Third Division, 1990–91 Third Division, 1997–98 Second Division, 1998–99 Second Division, 1999–2000 First Division, 2000–01 First Division
- Crystal Palace Player of the Year: 1994

=== Manager ===
Wales

UEFA European Championship

  - (bronze) Semi-finals (1): 2016

Individual

- Football League Championship Manager of the Month: February 2009
