= List of Fulham F.C. players =

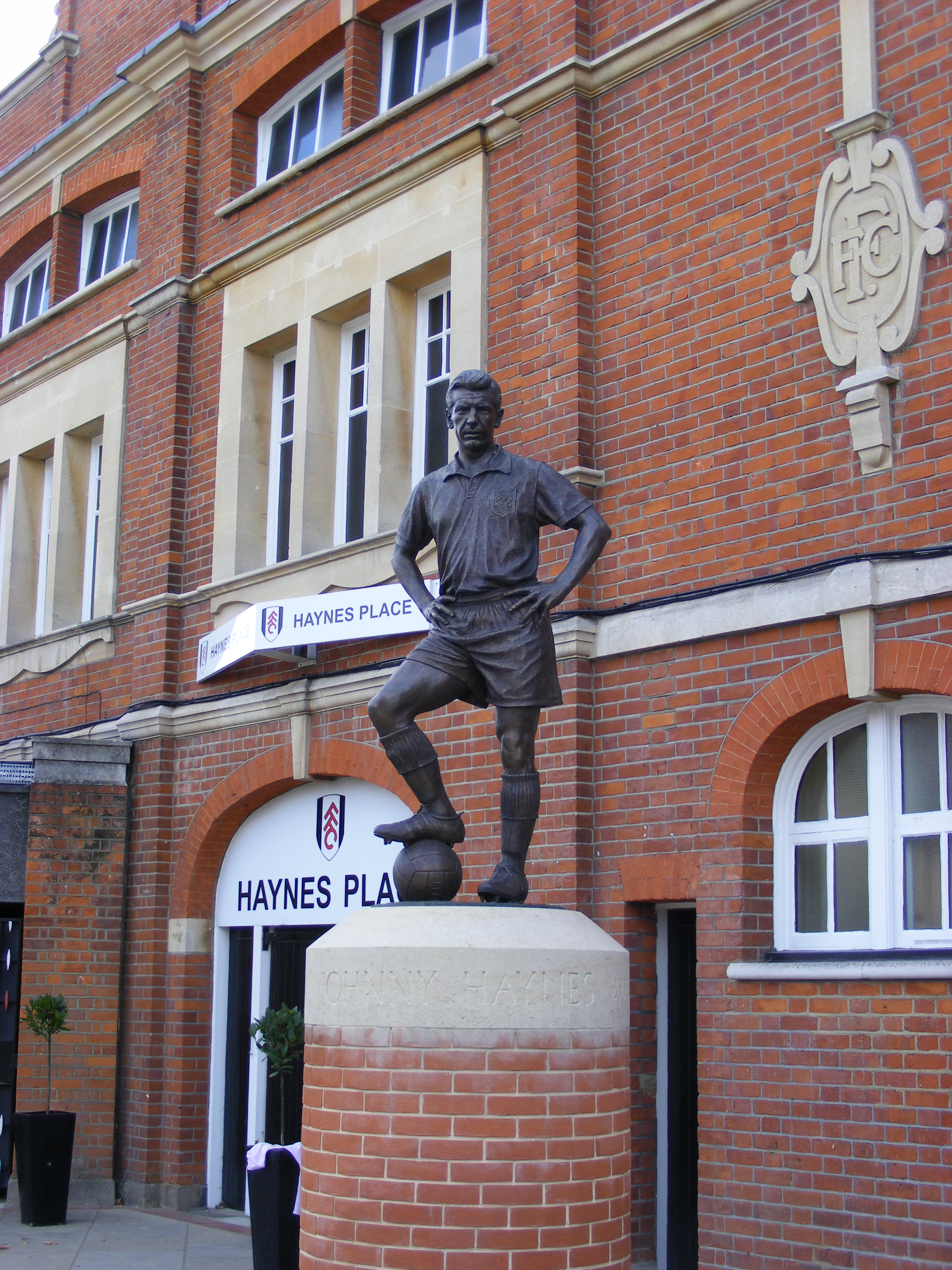
Johnny Haynes is Fulham's all-time record appearance maker with 658 matches, scoring 158 goals, and he is often considered Fulham's best-ever player. He was also a committed performer for the England national team, scoring 18 times in his 56 caps. This statue was erected outside Craven Cottage after his death in 2005.

Fulham Football Club is an English professional football team based in Fulham in the London Borough of Hammersmith and Fulham. The club was formed in West Kensington in 1879 as Fulham St Andrew's Church Sunday School F.C., shortened to Fulham F.C. in 1888. They initially played at Fulham Fields before a move to Craven Cottage in 1896; the club played their first professional match in December 1898 and made their FA Cup debut in the 1902–03 season. The club competed in the Southern Football League between 1898 and 1907, when they were accepted into the Football League Second Division. Having spent much of their history outside the top division, the team gained promotion to the Premier League in 2001. They spent more than ten seasons in the top flight, and reached the final of the UEFA Europa League in 2010. In 2014 they were relegated to the Championship. They have since spent one further season back in the Premier League in 2018–19 but suffered an immediate return to the Championship.

Since the club's first competitive match, 966 players have made an appearance in a competitive match, of which 186 have made at least 100 appearances (including substitute appearances); all players who have reached this milestone are listed below. The record number of appearances is held by Johnny Haynes, who played 658 matches in all competitions, scoring 158 goals, in a career spent entirely at Craven Cottage. Eddie Lowe is the only other player to have played more than 500 matches, although Les Barrett came close with 491 appearances. Gordon Davies is the club's record goalscorer, with 179 goals in 450 matches. Five other players have scored more than 100 goals for Fulham. Ryan Sessegnon, Tom Cairney, Harrison Reed, Antonee Robinson, and Harry Wilson are the current squad members who have played over 100 matches for Fulham.

== Players ==
This list contains the 187 players, including five current squad members, as of 22 December 2024, who have made more than 100 appearances for Fulham, ordered by the years in which they played for the club and then alphabetically by surname. The figure for league appearances and goals comprise those in the Southern Football League, the Football League and the Premier League. Total appearances and goals comprise those in the Southern Football League, Football League (including play-offs), Premier League, FA Cup, Football League Cup, Football League Trophy, UEFA Intertoto Cup and UEFA Cup/Europa League. Wartime matches are regarded as unofficial and are excluded, as are matches from the abandoned 1939–40 season. Statistics for the Watney Cup and Anglo-Scottish Cup are not included in the table. International appearances and goals are given for the senior national team only.

Figures are mostly taken from Fulham: The Complete Record by Dennis Turner (published in 2007). UEFA Intertoto Cup and UEFA Cup/Europa League appearance statistics for the 2002–03 and 2009–10 seasons are taken from Soccerbase, along with all other statistics from the 2007–08 season onwards.

Statistics are correct as of 22 December 2024. International statistics correct as of 19 November 2024.

Positions key
Pre-1960s		Post-1960s	
GK	Goalkeeper		
FB	Full back	DF	Defender
HB	Half back	MF	Midfielder
FW	Forward		

Symbol	Meaning
‡	Fulham player in the 2024–25 season.
*	Player has left Fulham but is still playing professional football.
^	Player is currently playing international football.
♦	Player went on to manage the club.
♠	Player holds the appearance or goalscoring record for Fulham.
(c)	Player captained the side.
Fulham career	The year of the player's first appearance for Fulham to the year of his last appearance
Apps	Number of appearances for Fulham, both starting and as a substitute
Int. apps	Appearances for his country's senior international team
Int. country	Flag only shown when a player has represented his country
Int. goals	Goals scored for his country's senior international team

Name	Position	Fulham career	League apps	League goals	Total apps	Total goals	Int. country (Note: Where a player did not compete internationally, no country is denoted. Between 1926 and 1950, two competing teams claimed to represent the island of Ireland. Where an Irish player from this period played for both teams, no flag is given. denotes players who played for the Irish Football Association team. denotes players who played for the Football Association of Ireland team. For more information, see Ireland national football team (1882–1950) and Republic of Ireland national football team.)	Int. apps	Int. goals	Notes	Refs
Jack Fryer	GK	1903–1911	142	0	168	0	None	0	0	—	
William Goldie	FB	1904–1908	156	5	178	5	None	0	0	—	
Billy Morrison	FB	1904–1908	122	8	142	9	None	0	0	—	
Harry Ross	FB	1904–1908	127	12	146	15	None	0	0	—	
Jimmy Sharp	FB	1904–1920	114	1	125	1	Scotland	5	0	—	
Arthur Collins	FB	1905–1914	260	9	279	11	None	0	0	—	
Ted Charlton	FB	1906–1920	249	7	267	7	None	0	0	—	
Fred Threlfall	HB	1907–1909	96	17	107	19	None	0	0	—	
Fred Harrison	FW	1907–1911	120	47	132	54	None	0	0	—	
Bob Suart	FB	1908–1911	97	1	102	1	None	0	0	—	
Robert Dalrymple	HB	1909–1911	98	40	108	44	None	0	0	—	
Fred Mavin	FB	1909–1913	140	29	149	29	None	0	0	—	
James Smith	HB	1909–1915	181	17	193	17	None	0	0	—	
Alf Marshall	FB	1909–1920	100	0	107	0	None	0	0	—	
Willie Walker	HB	1909–1921	170	23	178	24	None	0	0	—	
Wattie White	HB	1910–1923	191	18	203	18	None	0	0	—	
Arthur Reynolds	GK	1910–1925	399	0	446	0	None	0	0	—	
Jimmy Torrance	HB	1910–1926	338	33	357	33	None	0	0	—	
Tim Coleman	HB	1911–1914	94	46	100	49	England	1	0	—	
Harry Russell	FB	1913–1923	138	7	142	7	None	0	0	—	
Frank Penn	HB	1915–1934	427	45	459	52	None	0	0	—	
Harry Bagge	FB	1919–1926	179	1	191	1	None	0	0	—	
Alex Chaplin	FB	1919–1926	259	1	276	1	None	0	0	—	
Danny Shea	HB	1920–1923	100	23	107	24	England	2	0	—	
Tom Fleming	FB	1922–1925	111	0	114	0	None	0	0	—	
Teddy Craig	HB	1924–1930	151	29	161	31	None	0	0		
Len Oliver	FB	1924–1935	406	3	434	3	England	1	0	—	
Reg Dyer	FB	1925–1930	98	0	103	0	None	0	0	—	
David McNab	FB	1925–1930	158	21	169	21	None	0	0	—	
Ernie Beecham	GK	1925–1932	174	0	187	0	None	0	0	—	
Albert Barrett	FB	1925–1937	389	15	419	20	England	1	0	—	
Jimmy Temple	HB	1926–1931	156	58	168	61	None	0	0	—	
Bill Haley	HB	1928–1931	93	50	101	54	None	0	0	—	
Johnny Price	HB	1928–1937	190	49	205	53	England	0	0	(Note: Represented England at amateur level.)	
Jim Hammond	HB	1928–1939	316	142	342	151	None	0	0	—	
Sonny Gibbon	FB	1929–1934	114	1	127	1	Wales	0	0	(Note: Represented Wales at amateur level.)	
Syd Gibbons	FB	1930–1938	299	13	318	15	None	0	0	—	
Jimmy Hindson	FB	1930–1938	104	0	113	0	None	0	0	—	
Joe Birch	FB	1931–1938	185	0	195	0	None	0	0	—	
Alf Tootill	GK	1932–1938	203	0	214	0	None	0	0	—	
Jimmy Tompkins	FB	1932–1939	154	5	164	5	None	0	0	—	
Johnny Arnold	FB	1933–1939	202	57	213	62	England	1	0	—	
Mike Keeping	FB	1933–1939	205	7	217	7	None	0	0	—	
Bruce Clarke	HB	1934–1939	112	1	114	1	None	0	0	—	
Joe Bacuzzi	FB	1935–1956	283	2	289	2	None	0	0	—	
Trevor Smith	HB	1935–1938	93	19	100	21	None	0	0	—	
Bert Worsley	HB	1935–1940	106	15	112	16	None	0	0	—	
Ronnie Rooke	FW	1936–1946	105	70	110	78	None	0	0	—	
Harry Freeman	FB	1937–1952	179	7	190	8	None	0	0	—	
Jim Taylor	FB	1938–1953	261	5	278	5	England	2	0	—	
Arthur Stevens	HB	1943–1959	386	11	413	126	None	0	0	—	
Pat Beasley	HB	1945–1950	152	13	163	13	England	1	1	—	
Len Quested	HB	1946–1952	175	6	188	7	Australia	2	0		
Bob Thomas	HB	1947–1952	167	56	176	57	None	0	0	—	
Bedford Jezzard ♦	FW	1948–1956	292	154	306	154	England	2	0	(Note: Bedford Jezzard served as Fulham manager from a year after his retirement in 1957 through to 1964.)	
Bill Dodgin Jr.♦	DF	1949–1952; 1961–1964	104	0	113	0	England	0	0	(Note: Represented England at under-23 level.)	
Robin Lawler	FB/DF	1949–1962	281	0	299	0	Republic of Ireland	8	0	—	
Bobby Robson ♦	FW	1950–1956; 1962–1967	344	77	370	80	England	20	4	(Note: Bobby Robson became Fulham manager in January 1968 and saw out the rest of that season. He left the club in November 1968.)	
Ian Black	GK	1950–1959	263	1	277	1	Scotland	1	0	—	
Eddie Lowe	FB/DF	1950–1963	473	8	511	10	England	3	0	—	
Trevor "Tosh" Chamberlain	HB/MF	1951–1965	187	59	204	64	None	0	0	—	
Charlie Mitten	HB	1952–1956	154	32	160	33	None	0	0	—	
Roy Bentley	FB/DF / FW	1952–1961	142	23	158	25	England	12	9	—	
Jimmy Hill	HB/MF	1952–1961	276	41	297	52	None	0	0	—	
Joe Stapleton	FB/DF	1952–1961	97	2	104	2	None	0	0	—	
Johnny Haynes ♠ ♦ (c)	FW	1952–1970	594	147	658 ♠	158	England	56	18	(Note: Johnny Haynes is Fulham's record appearance maker, making 658 appearances in 18 years at the club. He was briefly player manager in 1968 after Bobby Robson was sacked.) (Note: Player spent a period of time as caretaker manager of the club)	
Tony Macedo	GK	1955–1968	346	0	391	0	None	0	0	—	
George Cohen	FB/DF	1956–1969	408	6	459	6	England	37	0	—	
Jim Langley	FB/DF	1957–1965	323	31	356	33	England	3	0	—	
Alan Mullery	HB/MF	1958–1964; 1972–1976	364	37	412	42	England	35	1	—	
Maurice Cook	FW	1958–1965	221	89	248	97	None	0	0	—	
Johnny Key	HB/MF	1958–1966	163	29	181	37	None	0	0	—	
Pat O'Connell	HB/MF	1958–1966	152	26	170	28	None	0	0	—	
Graham Leggat	FW	1958–1967	254	127	280	134	Scotland	18	8	—	
Bobby Keetch	FB/DF	1959–1966	106	2	120	2	None	0	0	—	
Stan Brown	FW	1959–1972	353	16	397	19	None	0	0	—	
Steve Earle	FW	1963–1973	291	98	327	108	None	0	0	—	
John Dempsey	DF	1964–1969	149	4	171	8	Republic of Ireland	19	1	—	
Fred Callaghan	DF	1964–1974	295	9	336	12	None	0	0	—	
Les Barrett	MF	1965–1977	423	75	491	90	None	0	0	—	
Allan Clarke	FW	1966–1968	86	45	100	57	England	19	10	—	
Jimmy Conway	MF	1966–1976	316	67	360	76	Republic of Ireland	20	0	—	
Reg Matthewson	DF	1968–1973	158	1	174	1	None	0	0	—	
Malcolm Webster	GK	1969–1974	94	0	104	0	None	0	0	—	
Barry Lloyd	MF	1969–1976	257	29	290	30	None	0	0	—	
Jimmy Dunne	DF	1970–1976	143	2	166	2	Republic of Ireland	1	0	—	
John Lacy	DF	1971–1978	168	7	188	8	None	0	0	—	
Les Strong	DF	1971–1983	372	5	427	6	None	0	0	—	
John Cutbush	DF	1972–1977	134	3	160	3	None	0	0	—	
Peter Mellor	GK	1972–1977	190	0	224	0	None	0	0	—	
John Mitchell	FW	1972–1978	169	56	194	60	None	0	0	—	
Viv Busby	FW	1973–1976	118	28	143	36	None	0	0	—	
Alan Slough	MF	1973–1977	154	14	187	17	None	0	0	—	
Bobby Moore	DF	1974–1977	124	1	150	1	England	108	2	—	
Terry Bullivant	MF	1974–1979	101	2	115	2	None	0	0	—	
John Evanson	MF	1976–1979	95	5	107	5	None	0	0	—	
Gerry Peyton	GK	1976–1986	345	0	395	0	Republic of Ireland	33	0	—	
Richard Money	DF	1977–1980	106	3	115	4	None	0	0	—	
Tony Gale	DF	1977–1984	277	19	318	21	None	0	0	—	
John Beck	MF	1978–1983	114	12	126	13	None	0	0	—	
Kevin Lock	DF	1978–1985	211	27	236	29	None	0	0	—	
Gordon Davies ♠	FW	1978–1991	396	159	450	178 ♠	Wales	16	2	(Note: Gordon Davies is Fulham's record goalscorer with 178 goals in 450 games in all competitions.)	
Robert Wilson	MF	1979–1985; 1987–1989	223	38	243	42	England	0	0	(Note: Represented England at under-21 level.)	
Roger Brown	DF	1980–1983	141	18	161	19	None	0	0	(Note: Roger Brown holds a club record for goalscoring as a defender with twelve goals in the 1981–82 season.)	
Jim Stannard	GK	1980–1985	391	1	430	1	None	0	0	—	
Ray Lewington ♦	MF	1980–1985; 1986–1990	234	21	276	24	None	0	0	(Note: Ray Lewington became player manager at Fulham in 1986 and remained in this position until 1990. He was the youngest manager in the Football League at the time of his appointment, aged 29.)	
Dean Coney	FW	1980–1987	211	56	244	72	None	0	0	—	
Peter Scott	MF	1981–1992	277	27	306	34	None	0	0	—	
Jeff Hopkins	DF	1981–1988	219	4	257	6	Wales	16	0	—	
Ray Houghton	MF	1982–1985	129	16	145	21	Republic of Ireland	73	6	—	
Paul Parker	DF	1982–1997	157	2	184	3	England	19	0	—	
Leroy Rosenior	FW	1982–1990	99	38	109	40	Sierra Leone	1	0	—	
John Marshall	MF	1982–1997	413	28	467	32	None	0	0	—	
Gary Elkins	DF	1983–1990	104	2	114	2	None	0	0	—	
Gary Barnett	MF	1984–1990	182	31	209	35	None	0	0	—	
Glen Thomas	DF	1985–1994	253	6	282	6	None	0	0	—	
Justin Skinner	MF	1986–1991	137	23	154	27	None	0	0	—	
Clive Walker	MF	1987–1989	109	29	125	32	None	0	0	—	
Jeff Eckhardt	DF	1987–1994	249	25	270	25	None	0	0	—	
Gary Brazil	FW	1990–1996	214	48	256	60	None	0	0	—	
Mark Newson	DF	1990–1993	102	4	110	4	None	0	0	—	
Julian Hails	MF	1990–1994	109	12	126	13	None	0	0	—	
Martin Pike	DF	1990–1994	190	14	205	15	None	0	0	—	
Simon Morgan	DF	1990–2001	352	47	420	56	None	0	0	—	
Sean Farrell	FW	1991–1994	94	31	104	35	None	0	0	—	
Duncan Jupp	MF	1993–1996	105	3	127	3	None	0	0	—	
Terry Angus	DF	1993–1997	120	5	146	7	None	0	0	—	
Robbie Herrera	DF	1993–1998	144	2	180	2	None	0	0	—	
Nick Cusack	MF	1994–1997	112	14	135	18	None	0	0	—	
Mark Blake	DF	1994–1998	141	17	161	20	None	0	0	—	
Martin Thomas	MF	1994–1998	87	8	105	11	None	0	0	—	
Mike Conroy	FW	1995–1998	94	32	115	42	None	0	0	—	
Sean Davis	MF	1996–2004	155	14	198	20	England	0	0		
Steve Hayward	MF	1997–2001	117	8	150	12	None	0	0	—	
Paul Peschisolido	FW	1997–2001	97	24	117	30	Canada	53	10	—	
Chris Coleman (c) ♦	DF	1997–2002	138	8	165	11	Wales	32	4	(Note: Chris Coleman was appointed Fulham manager ahead of the 2003–04 season.)	
Paul Trollope	MF	1997–2002	78	5	101	6	Wales	9	0	—	
Maik Taylor	GK	1997–2004	187	0	235	0	Northern Ireland	87	0	—	
Kit Symons	DF	1998–2001	102	13	129	14	Wales	36	2	—	
Rufus Brevett	DF	1998–2003	175	1	217	2	None	0	0	—	
Steve Finnan	DF	1998–2003	173	6	209	7	Republic of Ireland	52	2	—	
Barry Hayles	FW	1998–2004	175	44	215	57	Jamaica	10	0	—	
Andy Melville (c)	DF	1999–2004	153	4	193	4	Wales	65	3	—	
Lee Clark (c)	MF	1999–2005	151	20	178	22	England	0	0		
Zat Knight (c)	DF	1999–2007	150	3	181	4	England	2	0	—	
Luís Boa Morte (c)	FW	2000–2001; 2001–2007	205	44	250	54	Portugal	28	1	—	
Bjarne Goldbæk	MF	2000–2003	85	6	104	7	Denmark	28	0	—	
Louis Saha	FW	2000–2004	117	53	144	64	France	20	4	—	
Edwin van der Sar	GK	2001–2005	127	0	154	0	Netherlands	130	0	—	
Alain Goma (c)	DF	2001–2006	117	0	152	0	France	2	0	—	
Sylvain Legwinski	MF	2001–2006	128	8	164	12	France	0	0	(Note: Represented France at under-21 level.)	
Steed Malbranque	MF	2001–2006	172	32	211	44	None	0	0	(Note: Steed Malbranque was born in Belgium but represented France internationally.)	
Moritz Volz	DF	2003–2004; 2004–2009	125	2	144	4	Germany	0	0	(Note: Represented Germany at under-21 level.)	
Tomasz Radzinski	FW	2004–2007	103	10	117	17	Canada	46	10	—	
Carlos Bocanegra	DF	2004–2008	116	8	136	8	United States	110	14	—	
Collins John	FW	2004–2008	95	20	108	23	Netherlands	2	0	—	
Brian McBride	FW	2004–2008	139	32	153	40	United States	95	30	—	
Chris Baird	DF	2007–2013; 2016	127	4	167	4	Northern Ireland	77	0	—	
Simon Davies	MF	2007–2013	137	13	169	17	Wales	58	6	—	
Clint Dempsey	MF	2007–2012; 2014	189	49	230	58	United States	135	57	—	
Aaron Hughes	DF	2007–2014	186	1	238	2	Northern Ireland	112	1	—	
Paul Konchesky	DF	2007–2010	97	2	122	2	England	2	0	—	
Danny Murphy (c)	MF	2007–2012	169	18	210	29	England	9	1	—	
Dickson Etuhu	MF	2008–2012	91	3	127	6	Nigeria	33	0	—	
Brede Hangeland (c)	DF	2008–2014	221	8	281	12	Norway	91	4	—	
Mark Schwarzer	GK	2008–2013	172	0	221	0	Australia	109	0	—	
Zoltán Gera	MF	2008–2011	86	5	121	17	Hungary	97	26	—	
Andrew Johnson	FW	2008–2012	86	13	111	27	England	8	0	—	
Bobby Zamora	FW	2008–2012	91	20	134	37	England	2	0	—	
Damien Duff	MF	2009–2014	134	15	173	22	Republic of Ireland	100	8	—	
Steve Sidwell	MF	2011–2014	92	14	113	17	England	0	0		
Bryan Ruiz	FW	2011–2015	97	12	107	13	Costa Rica	147	29	—	
Scott Parker (c)♦	MF	2013–2017	119	6	128	6	England	18	0	(Note: Scott Parker was named Fulham manager on a temporary basis in February 2019, and this was made permanent in May 2019.)	
Marcus Bettinelli *	GK	2014– 2021	103	0	120	0	England	0	0		
Ross McCormack *	FW	2014–2016	96	38	100	42	Scotland ^	13	2	—	
Tom Cairney (c) ‡	MF	2015–	291	40	325	44	Scotland ^	2	0	—	
Tim Ream ‡	DF	2015–2024	281	5	312	5	United States ^	56	1	—	
Ryan Fredericks *	FW	2015–2018	106	0	114	0	England	0	0	(Note: Represented England at under-19 level.)	
Stefan Johansen *	MF	2016–2021	125	19	136	21	Norway ^	55	6	—	
Neeskens Kebano *	MF	2016–2023	139	21	160	24	DR Congo	35	6	—	
Kevin McDonald *	MF	2016–2021	116	6	128	6	Scotland ^	5	0	—	
Denis Odoi *	DF	2016–2022	151	4	170	7	Ghana ^	12	0	(Note: Odoi has 1 cap for Belgium and has since represented Ghana internationally.)	
Ryan Sessegnon ‡	FW	2016–2019, 2024–	107	22	123	25	England	0	0		
Aleksandar Mitrović *	FW	2018–2023	190	109	206	111	Serbia^	89	57	—	
Joe Bryan *	DF	2018–2023	102	2	117	5	None	0	0	—	
Antonee Robinson ‡	DF	2020–	153	2	168	3	United States^	50	4	—	
Harrison Reed ‡	MF	2020–	167	3	189	3	England	0	0	(Note: Represented England at under-20 level.)	
Harry Wilson ‡	MF	2021–	118	19	134	22	Wales^	60	12		
