= Arthur Collins =

Arthur Collins may refer to:

== Arts and entertainment ==
- Arthur Collins (singer) (1864–1933), American singer
- Arthur Collins (theatre manager) (1864–1932), manager of Drury Lane Theatre
- Arthur Greville Collins (1895–1980), American film director

== Business and commerce ==
- Arthur A. Collins (1909–1987), founder of Collins Radio
- Arthur D. Collins Jr. (born 1947), chairman of Medtronic

== Politics ==
- Arthur Collins (politician) (1832–1911), New Zealand politician
- Arthur R. Collins (born 1960), American political consultant

== Sport ==
- A. E. J. Collins (1885–1914), English cricketer and soldier
- Art Collins (basketball) (born 1954), retired American basketball player
- Arthur Collins (cricketer) (1871–1945), English cricketer
- Arthur Collins (footballer, born 1882) (1882–1953), English football defender
- Arthur Collins (footballer, born 1902) (1902–1974), English football goalkeeper
- Arthur Collins (rugby union) (1906–1988), New Zealand rugby player
- Arthur W. Collins (1890–1970), American college football player and coach

== Other ==
- Arthur Collins (antiquarian) (1682–1760), English genealogist and historian
- Arthur Collins (courtier) (1845–1911), English equerry in the courts of Queen Victoria and King Edward VII
- Arthur Collins (judge) (1834–1915), English colonial judge
- Arthur L. Collins (1868–1902), British metallurgist, mining engineer and mine manager
- Arthur S. Collins Jr. (1915–1984), United States Army general
- Arthur Collins (murder victim) (1937–1965), American man murdered in New York City

== See also ==
- Collins (surname)
