= List of Fulham F.C. seasons =

Fulham performances from 1907 until 2026

This article lists every season of Fulham Football Club from their first professional season in the Southern Football League Division 2, up to the present day. It details the club's achievements in major competitions and the top scorers in the league for each season. The table is correct up to the 2025–26 season.

== Seasons ==
Season	League									FA Cup	EFL Cup (Note: The EFL Cup was first held in 1960–61.)	Europe / Other		Top scorer(s) (Note: League goals only.)	
Season	Division	Pld	W	D	L	GF	GA	Pts	Pos	FA Cup	EFL Cup	Europe / Other		Player(s)	Goals
1898–99	SL Div 2L	22	6	4	12	36	44	16	10th	—				Freddie Hopkinson George Sheeran	9
1899–1900	SL Div 2	20	10	4	6	44	23	24	2nd	1Q				David Lloyd	14
1900–01	SL Div 2	16	8	0	8	38	26	16	5th	—				Tommy Meade	16
1900–01	LL Div 1	20	8	3	9	37	35	19	6th	—				Tommy Meade	16
1901–02	SL Div 2	16	13	0	3	51	19	26	1st	—				Tommy Meade	29
1902–03	SL Div 2	10	7	1	2	27	7	15	1st	5Q				David Lloyd Tommy Meade	9
1903–04	SL Div 1	34	9	12	13	34	35	30	11th	R1				Harry Fletcher	15
1903–04	LL Prem	12	3	1	8	10	29	7	6th	R1				Harry Fletcher	15
1904–05	SL Div 1	34	14	10	10	46	34	38	6th	QF				Willie Wardrope	26
1904–05	WL Div 1	20	7	3	10	29	32	17	6th	QF				Willie Wardrope	26
1905–06	SL Div 1	34	19	12	3	44	15	50	1st	R2				Willie Wardrope	14
1905–06	WL Div 1	20	5	5	10	23	32	15	10th	R2				Willie Wardrope	14
1906–07	SL Div 1	38	20	13	5	58	32	53	1st	R2				Walter Freeman	16
1906–07	WL Div 1A	10	7	1	2	16	9	15	1st	R2				Walter Freeman	16
1907–08	Div 2	38	22	5	11	82	49	49	4th	SF				Robert Dalrymple	19
1908–09	Div 2	38	13	11	14	58	48	37	10th	R2				Fred Harrison	13
1909–10	Div 2	38	14	13	11	51	43	41	7th	R2				Fred Harrison	14
1910–11	Div 2	38	15	7	16	52	48	37	10th	R1				James Smith	11
1911–12	Div 2	38	16	7	15	66	58	39	8th	QF				Bert Pearce	21
1912–13	Div 2	38	17	5	16	65	55	39	9th	R1				Tim Coleman	20
1913–14	Div 2	38	16	6	16	46	43	38	11th	R1				Bert Pearce	14
1914–15	Div 2	38	15	7	16	53	47	37	12th	R2				Harry Lee	16
1915–16	—N/a (Note: Regional competitions implemented due to outbreak of World War I.)									—				Will Taylor	21
1916–17	—N/a									—				Gordon Hoare	23
1917–18	—N/a									—				Harry Morris	24
1918–19	—N/a									—				Johnny McIntyre	16
1919–20	Div 2	42	19	9	14	61	50	47	6th	R1				Donald Cock	25
1920–21	Div 2	42	16	10	16	43	47	42	9th	R3				Barney Travers	11
1921–22	Div 2	42	18	9	15	57	38	45	7th	R2				Barney Travers	17
1922–23	Div 2	42	16	12	14	43	32	44	10th	R1				Frank Osborne	10
1923–24	Div 2	42	10	14	18	45	56	34	20th	R2				George Edmonds	13
1924–25	Div 2	42	15	10	17	41	56	40	12th	R2				Bill Prowse	16
1925–26	Div 2	42	11	12	19	46	77	34	19th	QF				Albert Pape	11
1926–27	Div 2	42	13	8	21	58	92	34	18th	R4				Johnny Tonner	13
1927–28	Div 2	42	13	7	22	68	89	33	21st	R3				Sid Elliott	26
1928–29	Div 3S	42	21	10	11	101	71	52	5th	R2				Jimmy Temple	26
1929–30	Div 3S	42	18	11	13	87	83	47	7th	R4				Bill Haley	21
1930–31	Div 3S	42	18	7	17	77	75	43	9th	R3				Jim Hammond	14
1931–32	Div 3S	42	24	9	9	111	62	57	1st	R3				Frank Newton	43
1932–33	Div 2	42	20	10	12	78	65	50	3rd	R3				Frank Newton	27
1933–34	Div 2	42	15	7	20	48	67	37	16th	R3				Jim Hammond	15
1934–35	Div 2	42	17	12	13	76	56	46	7th	R3				Jim Hammond	22
1935–36	Div 2	42	15	14	13	76	52	44	9th	SF				Jim Hammond	15
1936–37	Div 2	42	15	13	14	71	61	43	11th	R3				Ronnie Rooke	19
1937–38	Div 2	42	16	11	15	61	57	43	8th	R3				Ronnie Rooke	17
1938–39	Div 2	42	17	10	15	61	55	44	12th	R4				Ronnie Rooke	21
1939–40	Div 2	3	0	1	2	3	6	1	— (Note: The 1939–40 league season was abandoned due to the outbreak of World War II, with regional competitions implemented.)	—				Ronnie Rooke	27
1940–41	—N/a (Note: Regional competitions implemented due to outbreak of World War II.)									—				Ronnie Rooke	24
1941–42	—N/a									—				Ronnie Rooke	30
1942–43	—N/a									—				Ronnie Rooke	23
1943–44	—N/a									—				Ronnie Rooke	32
1944–45	—N/a									—				Ronnie Rooke	27
1945–46	—N/a									R3				Ronnie Rooke	33
1946–47	Div 2	42	15	9	18	63	74	39	15th	R3				Ronnie Rooke	13
1947–48	Div 2	42	15	10	17	47	46	40	11th	QF				Arthur Stevens	11
1948–49	Div 2	42	24	9	9	77	37	57	1st	R3				Bob Thomas	23
1949–50	Div 1	42	10	14	18	41	54	34	17th	R3				Bob Thomas	10
1950–51	Div 1	42	13	11	18	52	68	37	18th	QF				Bob Thomas	14
1951–52	Div 1	42	8	11	23	58	77	27	22nd	R3				Bedford Jezzard	8
1952–53	Div 2	42	17	10	15	81	71	44	8th	R3				Bedford Jezzard	35
1953–54	Div 2	42	17	10	15	98	85	44	8th	R4				Bedford Jezzard	39
1954–55	Div 2	42	14	11	17	76	79	39	14th	R3				Bedford Jezzard Bobby Robson	23
1955–56	Div 2	42	20	6	16	89	79	46	9th	R4				Bedford Jezzard	27
1956–57	Div 2	42	19	4	19	84	76	42	11th	R4				Roy Dwight	25
1957–58	Div 2	42	20	12	10	97	59	52	5th	SF				Roy Dwight	22
1958–59	Div 2	42	27	6	9	96	61	60	2nd	R4				Johnny Haynes	25
1959–60	Div 1	42	17	10	15	73	80	44	10th	R4				Graham Leggat	18
1960–61	Div 1	42	14	8	20	72	95	36	17th	R3	R1			Graham Leggat	23
1961–62	Div 1	42	13	7	22	66	74	33	20th	SF	R1			Maurice Cook Graham Leggat	14
1962–63	Div 1	42	14	10	18	50	71	38	16th	R3	R4			Maurice Cook	15
1963–64	Div 1	42	13	13	16	58	65	39	15th	R4	R2			Graham Leggat	15
1964–65	Div 1	42	11	12	19	60	78	34	20th	R3	R3			Rodney Marsh	17
1965–66	Div 1	42	14	7	21	67	85	35	20th	R3	R4			Graham Leggat	16
1966–67	Div 1	42	11	12	19	71	83	34	18th	R4	R4			Allan Clarke	24
1967–68	Div 1	42	10	7	25	56	98	27	22nd	R4	QF			Allan Clarke	20
1968–69	Div 2	42	7	11	24	40	81	25	22nd	R4	R2			Brian Dear	7
1969–70	Div 3	46	20	15	11	81	55	55	4th	R1	R2			Steve Earle	22
1970–71	Div 3	46	24	12	10	68	41	60	2nd	R1	QF			Les Barrett	15
1971–72	Div 2	42	12	10	20	45	68	34	20th	R4	R2			Steve Earle	11
1972–73	Div 2	42	16	12	14	58	49	44	9th	R3	R2			Steve Earle	15
1973–74	Div 2	42	16	10	16	39	43	42	13th	R4	R3			Viv Busby	11
1974–75	Div 2	42	13	16	13	44	39	42	9th	RU	R4			Viv Busby	11
1975–76	Div 2	42	13	14	15	45	47	40	12th	R3	R3	Anglo-Scottish Cup	RU	John Mitchell	10
1976–77	Div 2	42	11	13	18	54	61	35	17th	R3	R3	Anglo-Scottish Cup	GS	John Mitchell	19
1977–78	Div 2	42	14	13	15	49	49	41	10th	R3	R1	Anglo-Scottish Cup	QF	John Mitchell	9
1978–79	Div 2	42	13	15	14	50	47	41	10th	R4	R2	Anglo-Scottish Cup	GS	Chris Guthrie	13
1979–80	Div 2	42	11	7	24	42	74	29	20th	R3	R2			Gordon Davies	15
1980–81	Div 3	46	15	13	18	57	64	43	13th	R4	R1			Gordon Davies	18
1981–82	Div 3	46	21	15	10	77	51	78	3rd	R2	R4			Gordon Davies	24
1982–83	Div 2	42	20	9	13	64	47	69	4th	R4	R2			Gordon Davies	19
1983–84	Div 2	42	15	12	15	60	53	57	11th	R3	R3			Gordon Davies	21
1984–85	Div 2	42	19	8	15	68	64	65	9th	R3	R3			Robert Wilson	11
1985–86	Div 2	42	10	6	26	45	69	36	22nd	R3	R3	Full Members' Cup	R1(S)	Dean Coney	12
1986–87	Div 3	46	12	17	17	59	77	53	18th	R3	R2	Associate Members' Cup	QF(S)	Dean Coney	10
1987–88	Div 3	46	19	9	18	69	60	66	9th	R1	R2	Associate Members' Cup	PR(S)	Leroy Rosenior	20
1988–89	Div 3	46	22	9	15	69	67	75	4th	R1	R1	Associate Members' Cup	PR(S)	Gordon Davies	14
1988–89	Div 3	46	22	9	15	69	67	75	4th	R1	R1	League play-offs	SF	Gordon Davies	14
1989–90	Div 3	46	12	15	19	55	66	51	20th	R2	R2	Associate Members' Cup	PR(S)	Clive Walker	13
1990–91	Div 3	46	10	16	20	41	56	46	21st	R2	R1	Associate Members' Cup	R1(S)	Gordon Davies	6
1991–92	Div 3	46	19	13	14	57	53	70	9th	R1	R1	Associate Members' Cup	QF(S)	Gary Brazil	14
1992–93	Div 2 (Note: After formation of the Premier League, the Football League restructured and Division Three became Division Two.)	46	16	17	13	57	55	65	12th	R1	R1	Football League Trophy	R2(S)	Sean Farrell	12
1993–94	Div 2	46	14	10	22	50	63	52	21st	R1	R2	Football League Trophy	SF(S)	Gary Brazil	14
1994–95	Div 3	42	16	14	12	60	54	62	8th	R2	R2	Football League Trophy	R2(S)	Simon Morgan	11
1995–96	Div 3	46	12	17	17	57	63	53	17th (Note: Lowest League finish.)	R3	R2	Football League Trophy	QF(S)	Mike Conroy	9
1996–97	Div 3	46	25	12	9	72	38	87	2nd	R1	R2	Football League Trophy	R1(S)	Mike Conroy	23
1997–98	Div 2	46	20	10	16	60	43	70	6th	R3	R2	Football League Trophy	R2(S)	Paul Moody	15
1997–98	Div 2	46	20	10	16	60	43	70	6th	R3	R2	League play-offs	SF	Paul Moody	15
1998–99	Div 2	46	31	8	7	79	32	101	1st	R5	R3	Football League Trophy	R2(S)	Geoff Horsfield	15
1999–2000	Div 1	46	17	16	13	49	41	67	9th	R5	QF			Lee Clark	8
2000–01	Div 1	46	30	11	5	90	32	101	1st	R3	QF			Louis Saha	27
2001–02	Prem	38	10	14	14	36	44	44	13th	SF	R4			Barry Hayles Steed Malbranque Louis Saha	8
2002–03	Prem	38	13	9	16	41	50	48	14th	R5	R4	UEFA Intertoto Cup	W (Note: Intertoto Cup winners entered the first round of the UEFA Cup this season.)	Steed Malbranque	6
2002–03	Prem	38	13	9	16	41	50	48	14th	R5	R4	UEFA Cup	R3	Steed Malbranque	6
2003–04	Prem	38	14	10	14	52	46	52	9th	QF	R2			Louis Saha	13
2004–05	Prem	38	12	8	18	52	60	44	13th	R5	QF			Andy Cole	12
2005–06	Prem	38	14	6	18	48	58	48	12th	R3	R3			Collins John	11
2006–07	Prem	38	8	15	15	38	60	39	16th	R5	R2			Brian McBride	9
2007–08	Prem	38	8	12	18	38	60	36	17th	R3	R3			Clint Dempsey	6
2008–09	Prem	38	14	11	13	39	34	53	7th (Note: Highest League finish.)	QF	R3			Andrew Johnson	10
2009–10	Prem	38	12	10	16	39	46	46	12th	QF	R3	UEFA Europa League	RU	Bobby Zamora	8
2010–11	Prem	38	11	16	11	49	43	49	8th	R5	R3			Clint Dempsey	13
2011–12	Prem	38	14	10	14	48	51	52	9th	R4	R3	UEFA Europa League	GS	Clint Dempsey	17
2012–13	Prem	38	11	10	17	50	60	43	12th	R4	R2			Dimitar Berbatov	15
2013–14	Prem	38	9	5	24	40	85	32	19th	R4	R4			Steve Sidwell	8
2014–15	Champ	46	14	10	22	62	83	52	17th	R4	R4			Ross McCormack	17
2015–16	Champ	46	12	15	19	66	79	51	20th	R3	R3			Ross McCormack	21
2016–17	Champ	46	22	14	10	85	57	80	6th	R5	R3	League play-offs	SF	Tom Cairney	12
2017–18	Champ	46	25	13	8	79	46	88	3rd (Note: Promoted via the play-offs.)	R3	R2	League play-offs	W	Ryan Sessegnon	15
2018–19	Prem	38	7	5	26	34	81	26	19th	R3	R4			Aleksandar Mitrović	11
2019–20	Champ	46	23	12	11	64	48	81	4th (Note: Promoted via the play-offs.)	R4	R2	League play-offs	W	Aleksandar Mitrović	26
2020–21	Prem	38	5	13	20	27	53	28	18th	R4	R4			Bobby De Cordova-Reid	5
2021–22	Champ	46	27	9	10	106	43	90	1st	R4	R3			Aleksandar Mitrović	43
2022–23	Prem	38	15	7	16	55	53	52	10th	QF	R2			Aleksandar Mitrović	14
2023–24	Prem	38	13	8	17	55	61	47	13th	R4	SF			Rodrigo Muniz	9
2024–25	Prem	38	15	9	14	54	54	54	11th	QF	R3			Raúl Jiménez	12
2025–26	Prem	38	15	7	16	47	51	52	11th	R5	QF			Harry Wilson	10

=== Overall ===
- Seasons spent at Level 1 of the football league system: 31
- Seasons spent at Level 2 of the football league system: 57
- Seasons spent at Level 3 of the football league system: 18
- Seasons spent at Level 4 of the football league system: 3

== Key ==
- Pld – Matches played
- W – Matches won
- D – Matches drawn
- L – Matches lost
- GF – Goals for
- GA – Goals against
- Pts – Points
- Pos – Final position
- Prem – Premier League
- Champ – EFL Championship
- Div 1 – Football League First Division
- Div 2 – Football League Second Division
- Div 3 – Football League Third Division
- Div 3S – Football League Third Division South
- SL Div 1 – Southern League Division One
- SL Div 2 – Southern League Division Two
- SL Div 2L – Southern League Division Two (London section)
- LL Prem – London League Premier Division
- LL Div 1– London League Division One
- WL Div 1 – Western League Division One
- WL Div 1A – Western League Division One Section A
- n/a – Not applicable
- 5Q – Fifth qualifying round
- PR – Preliminary round
- GS – Group stage
- R1 – First round
- R2 – Second round
- R3 – Third round
- R4 – Fourth round
- R5 – Fifth round
- QF – Quarter-finals
- SF – Semi-finals
- RU – Runners-up
- W – Winners
- (S) – Southern section of regionalised stage

Winners	Runners-up	Promoted	Relegated
