= James Tompkins =

James Tompkins may refer to:

- Jimmy Tompkins (priest) (1870–1953), Canadian Roman Catholic priest
- Jimmy Tompkins (footballer) (1914–1944), English footballer
- James Tompkins (Australian rules footballer), Australian rules footballer for Port Adelaide

== See also ==
- James Tomkins (disambiguation)
