= Bill Haley (disambiguation) =

Bill Haley (1925–1981) was a pioneering American rock and roll musician.

Bill Haley may also refer to:

- Bill Haley (Texas politician) (born 1943), Texan legislator
- Bill Haley (Wyoming politician), Wyoming legislator
- Bill Haley (footballer), English association football midfielder
- William Michael Haley, husband of politician Nikki Haley, known as William or Bill until 1989
