= Bruce Clark =

Bruce Clark (or Clarke) may refer to:

- Bruce Allan Clark (born 1944), activist for Native American rights
- Bruce Clark (gridiron football) (born 1958), American NFL football player who played for the New Orleans Saints and Kansas City Chiefs
- Bruce Clark (journalist), international security editor of The Economist
- Bruce Clark (bishop) (born 1939), Anglican bishop of Riverina, Australia
- Bruce Clark (rugby league) (born 1958), Australian rugby league footballer
- Bruce Clarke (musician) (1925–2008), Australian jazz musician
- Bruce Clarke (soccer) (1910–?), South African footballer
- Bruce C. Clarke (1901–1988), commander of the Continental Army Command
- Bruce B. G. Clarke (born 1943), retired US Army officer, author and consultant
