= Alfred Marshall (disambiguation) =

Alfred Marshall (1842–1924) was an economist.

Alfred Marshall may also refer to:

- Alfred Marshall (politician) (1797–1868), United States representative from Maine
- Alf Marshall (footballer, born 1888) (1888–1923), English footballer
- Alfred Marshall (RAF officer) (1915–1944), British flying ace with the Royal Air Force during the Second World War
- Alfred Marshall (businessman) (1919–2013), American businessman who founded Marshalls, a chain of department stores
- Alf Marshall (footballer, born 1933) (1933–2021), English footballer

== See also ==
- Alfred Marshall Bailey (1894–1978)
