= Ted Charlton =

Ted Charlton may refer to:

- Ted Charlton (New Zealand footballer), New Zealand international footballer in the 1960s
- Ted Charlton (footballer, born 1888) (1888–1978), English football defender
