= New York City Subway attack =

New York City Subway attack may refer to:

- Murder of Arthur Collins (1965)
- 1984 New York City Subway shooting
- 2017 New York City Subway bombing
- 2020 New York City Subway fire
- Killing of Michelle Go (2022)
- 2022 New York City Subway attack
- Killing of Jordan Neely (2023)
- Killing of Debrina Kawam (2024)

== See also ==
- Crime in New York City
- List of mass shootings in the United States
