= Jimmy Tompkins (footballer) =

English footballer

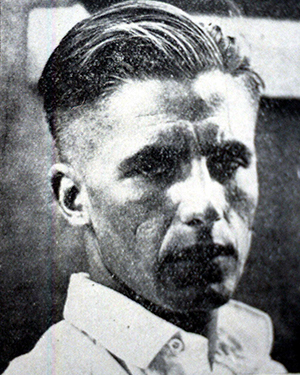
- Jimmy Tompkins

Personal information
- Full name: John James Tompkins
- Date of birth: 1914
- Place of birth: Edmonton, London, England
- Date of death: 1944 (aged 29–30)

Senior career*
Years	Team	Apps	(Gls)
1934–1939	Fulham		
- * Club domestic league appearances and goals

John James Tompkins (1914–1944) was an English professional footballer who played all his professional career for Fulham Football Club before his death in World War II.

== Early life and career ==
Tompkins was born in Edmonton, North London in 1914, the son of Arthur and Annie Tompkins. He began his football career playing as an amateur for Woking whilst at the same time being registered (as an amateur) with Fulham. His paid employment was as a member of Arsenal's ground staff; it was during this period that the legendary Arsenal manager Herbert Chapman saw him play and was reportedly disappointed to hear that Fulham had already signed him, opining that "Tompkins was a future international."

== Fulham ==
Tompkins signed as a professional for Fulham on 15 March 1934. Between then and 1939 he made 164 appearances for the club, 154 of which were in the Football League. He began his career as a centre half-back, but suffered from a lack of opportunities due to the presence of club stalwart Syd Gibbons. Moved to left half-back he quickly became established in the side, his 164 appearances including an unbroken run of ninety games. A forceful player renowned for his brave tackling, time on the ball in defence and attacking runs, he also scored five goals. His career highlights included playing in an F.A. cup semi-final against Sheffield United in 1936. Towards the end of his career he occasionally deputised as captain when regular skipper Mike Keeping was absent through injury.

== War service ==
Seeing the imminent approach of World War II Tompkins signed on in the Territorial Army. On the outbreak of hostilities he was swiftly drafted into the regular army as a private with the Royal Fusiliers. He worked his way rapidly through the non-commissioned ranks, then was commissioned as an officer in 1942. At the time of his death he had been seconded to the Hampshire regiment, had attained the rank of Major and held a provisional rank as lieutenant colonel, a remarkable rise even in the accelerated promotions of wartime.

== Death ==
Tompkins joined the Allied offensive in France shortly after D-Day. On 10 July 1944 he was ordered to lead his command in an attempt to secure the village of Maltot; unknown to his commanders, Maltot was surrounded by German Tiger tanks concealed in woods and depressions which opened fire as the Hampshires entered the town. Fifty-six men were killed before the order to withdraw was given. Tompkins was last seen charging a machine gun nest, but his body was never found. It is assumed he and his comrades must have suffered a direct hit from a German tank shell. His name is inscribed on the war memorial at Bayeux, panel 13, column 1.

== Personal life ==
Tompkins married Cecilia Parker in 1939. The couple had two children, Neil (1940–1965) and Jill (m. Harris) (1943–present). Cecilia died from a liver infection in 1944, two months before her husband. Neil was a promising sportsman, playing cricket for Surrey seconds; he also played football for the RAF, having joined the service in 1959. He was killed in February 1965 when the Canberra bomber in which he was navigator crashed into a hillside near Osnabrück during a low level exercise in poor visibility, killing both himself and the pilot.

Fulham Football Club paid each of Tompkins' children half of the £500 Tompkins had been due to receive from his benefit year, which he missed due to the war, on their 21st birthdays.
