= 1898–99 Fulham F.C. season =

Fulham
1898–99 season
- Southern League Division Two (London): 10th
Home colours

The 1898–99 season was Fulham's first season as a professional club. They competed in the London section of the Southern League Division Two, where they finished 10th out of 12 clubs.

== See also ==
- Fulham F.C. seasons
