= James Tomkins =

James Tomkins may refer to:

- James Tomkins (MP) (c. 1569–1636), English MP for Leominster
- James Tomkins (rower) (born 1965), Australian rower
- James Tomkins (footballer) (born 1989), English footballer

== See also ==
- James Tompkins (disambiguation)
