= Switzerland national football B team =

Switzerland B
- Association: Swiss Football Association
First colours	Second colours

The Switzerland national football B team was a secondary football team that served as a support for the Switzerland national football team.

== History ==
The team played its first game on 6 November 1932 in Luxembourg City, ending in a 2–2 draw against Team Luxembourg A.

The B Team saw the development of many future stars of the national team and the Swiss Raiffaisen Super League. The side played home games across the country. Stadiums used included Geneva's Servette Stadium, St. Jakob-Park (Basel), and Letzigrund (Zürich).

The Swiss side occasionally played against B teams from other nations such as England, a game they lost 4–0. The squads official website was on www.football.ch and seats were cheap and at times free. The team led to the development of many players cherished by the game today.
