= England national football B team =

Secondary national association football team

England B
- Nickname: The Three Lions
- Association: The Football Association
- Head coach: England national football team manager
- Most caps: Joe Corrigan (10)
- Top scorer: Bedford Jezzard (6)
First colours	Second colours

First international
- Switzerland 0–0 England (Geneva, Switzerland; 21 February 1947)

Biggest win
- Singapore 0–8 England (Singapore; 18 June 1978)

Biggest defeat
- France Espoirs 7–1 England (Le Havre, France; 22 May 1952)

The England national football B team is a secondary football team run occasionally as support for the England national football team. At times they have played other nations' full teams; they have also played matches against 'B' teams from other football associations. Since the team's first use in 1947, there have been 54 official and 3 unofficial B team matches. It has been inactive since May 2007.

== History ==
Walter Winterbottom first proposed B team matches as a way of bringing players through into the national side (the Under 21 team, the current stepping stone to the national team, did not exist until 1976.). He organised the first recorded game held under the name of 'England B', which was played in Geneva on 21 February 1947 against Switzerland B team. The match finished 0–0. The games proved useful as an introduction to the national team and the first official England B team game came in 1949 in a 4–0 victory over Finland.

The frequency of the games depends almost entirely upon the head coach of the England squad. For example, there were no B team internationals under Sir Alf Ramsey or Don Revie; indeed there were none between 1957 and 1978. Ron Greenwood reintroduced them and Bobby Robson used them regularly – there were nine B team internationals in 1989 and 1990. This period saw the likes of Paul Gascoigne enter the England team via the B squad. Graham Taylor continued Robson's practice of holding regular B team matches. Terry Venables held two in 1994, but a four-year hiatus followed. Glenn Hoddle also arranged two B team matches, as part of his build up to the 1998 FIFA World Cup, with a further gap until 2006.

Both Sven-Göran Eriksson and Steve McClaren arranged just one B team match each during their periods as England manager, Eriksson's match was held on 25 May 2006 against Belarus as a World Cup warm-up game. England lost 2–1, with a goal from Jermaine Jenas. McClaren's only match with the B team was against the Albania full side on 25 May 2007 at Burnley's Turf Moor ground, which they won 3–1, as preparation for England's Euro 2008 qualifier against Estonia on 6 June 2007. The squad included a recovering Michael Owen, who captained the side, as well as seven uncapped players, five of whom went on to receive full international caps. There have been no B team matches since May 2007.

== Prestige and purpose ==
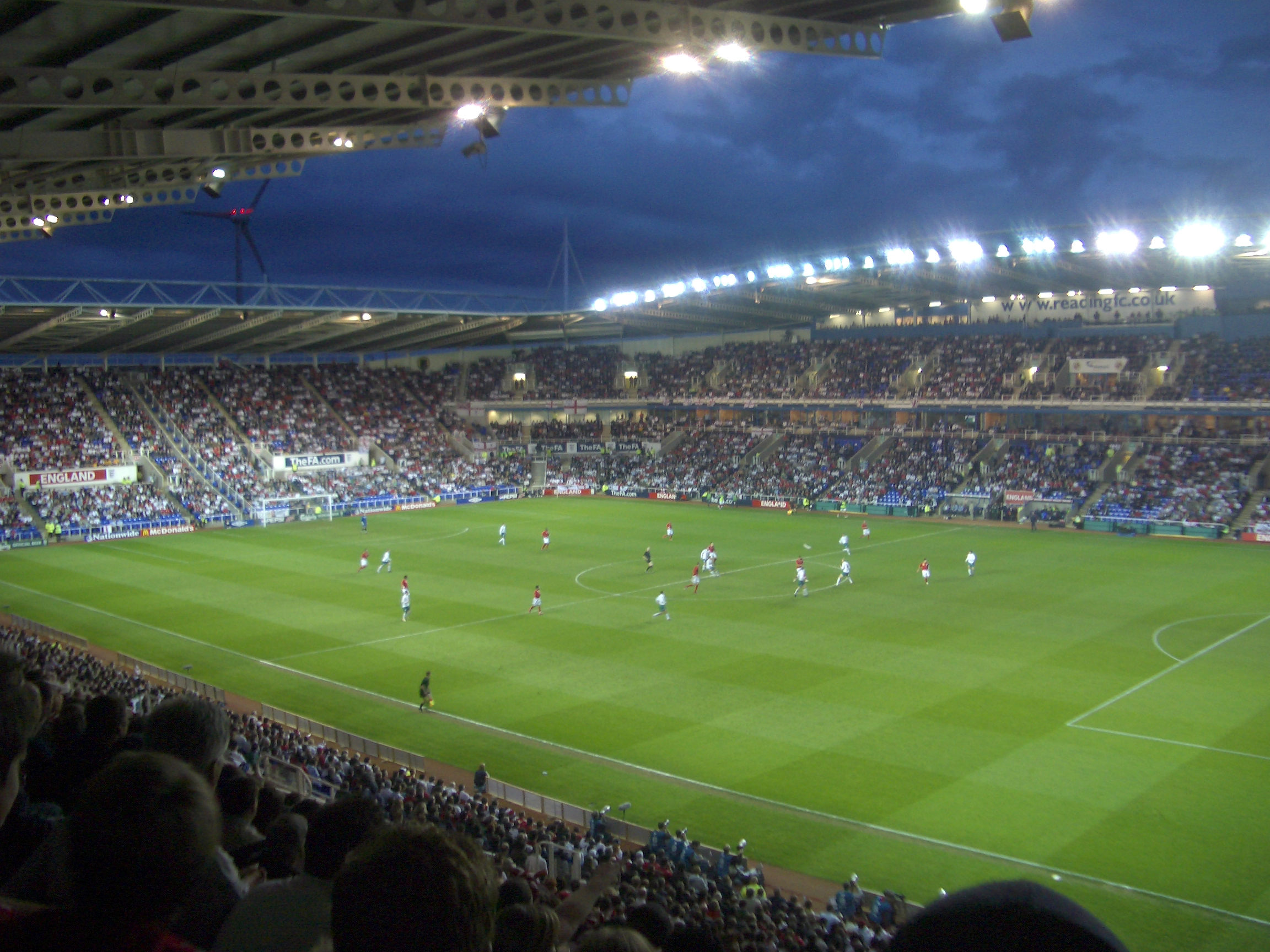
Match at the Madejski Stadium against Belarus in 2006

The aim of games has typically been to introduce younger or more inexperienced players into the national team set up, without giving them a full cap. They may often be held before World Cups or other tournaments to give second choice players, injured players or possible choices an opportunity to have a full game to either keep their fitness or play their way into the first team.

Attendances at matches and opponents have varied widely, with matches against first teams (the last of which was in 2007 against Albania), Olympics teams, youth teams and other B team squads. The most recent game against Albania had an attendance of 22,500 at Turf Moor. Prior to the two higher attendances for the games in 2006 and 2007, the previous time that the B team had played in front of more than 20,000 people was in 1978 in a match in Singapore, against their national team, when 40,000 people attended. The matches have often struggled to interest fans, however, with games during the 1980s and 1990s attracting as few as 4,000 fans. The highest attendances for England B games were in a series of matches against the Netherlands and Netherlands B in the 1950s, when the Olympisch Stadion in Amsterdam saw three matches with an attendance of 60,000. The highest attendance at home for the B team was 43,068 at St James' Park, Newcastle, again against the Netherlands on 22 February 1950.

Players have also sometimes expressed a dislike for the B team. When Chris Sutton was picked for England B before the 1998 FIFA World Cup, he refused to play for the team, claiming that it was a waste of time and that he should have been picked for the first team. This boycott, however, ended Sutton's chances of ever playing for the full national team again. Furthermore, Matt Le Tissier, who scored a hat-trick for the England B team against Russia B in that match, controversially failed to make the 1998 FIFA World Cup squad. On the other hand, Darren Anderton successfully returned to the first team squad via the B team after recovering from injury in 1998, whilst other players such as Paul Gascoigne have been brought to the full team via the Bs.

In 2006, the England B team game was seen as being useful for giving a glimpse of potential future England players. In particular, it proved useful for Aaron Lennon and Peter Crouch to stake their claims for places in the 2006 FIFA World Cup squad. Furthermore, it provided match practice for Michael Owen and Sol Campbell, who were both returning from injury. Overall, 12 players from the 2006 B team squad eventually made it to the final World Cup squad. However, an injury picked up in the game prevented goalkeeper Robert Green from playing at the World Cup and of the twelve players in both squads, five were established players with over 25 caps.

In the period since the most recent match in 2007, there has been little comment about the B team. Former England international goalkeeper David James in 2010 called for a return of regular matches, but this call has not been repeated.

== Statistics ==
=== Results and fixtures ===
The England B team has not played since 2007. Its most recent match was a 3–1 victory against Albania at Turf Moor, Burnley, 25 May 2007. There are no scheduled fixtures.

=== Historical statistics ===
- Highest attendance – 60,000 v Netherlands and Netherlands B (3 times) at Olympisch Stadion, Amsterdam
- Highest home attendance – 43 608 v Netherlands at St James' Park, Newcastle, 22 February 1950
- Biggest victory – 8–0 v Singapore, 18 June 1978 at National Stadium, Singapore
- Heaviest defeat – 1–7 v France espoirs, 22 May 1952, Le Havre

Overall match record:

- Played 57, Won 37, Drawn 10, Lost 9, Abandoned 1
  - Versus national teams: P19 W15 D2 L2
  - Versus national B teams: P38 W22 D8 L7 A1
  - Versus others: P2 W1 D0 L1

== Player records ==
Player records for the England B team come largely from groups of players who were involved with the side during short periods in which frequent games were played, notably between 1978 and 1981, and again between 1989 and 1994. These two periods count for 29, or just over half, of all England B games.

=== Most appearances ===
Rank	Name	Caps	Goals	Years
1	Joe Corrigan	10	0	1978–1981
2	Gary Pallister	9	0	1989–1992
=	Gary Mabbutt	9	1	1984–1992
4	Brian Talbot	8	3	1978–1980
5	Gary Owen	7	0	1978
=	Viv Anderson	7	2	1978–1980
=	Alan Kennedy	7	2	1978–1980
=	Paul Mariner	7	2	1978–1980
=	Alan Sunderland	7	1	1978–1981
=	Dave Beasant	7	0	1989–1991
=	Tony Dorigo	7	0	1989–1992

=== Top scorers ===
Rank	Name	Caps	Goals	Years
1	Bedford Jezzard	3	6	1954–1955
2	Tommy Taylor	2	4	1956
=	Gordon Hill	6	4	1978
=	Alan Smith	4	4	1990–1992
5	Jack Rowley	1	3	1949
=	Brian Talbot	8	3	1978–1980
=	Paul Merson	4	3	1991–1998
=	Matt Le Tissier	6	3	1990–1998

== See also ==
- England national football team
- England national football C team
