= Bert Worsley =

English footballer

Personal information
- Full name: Bert Worsley
- Date of birth: 20 September 1911
- Place of birth: Stockport, England
- Date of death: 21 June 1971 (aged 59)
- Height: 5 ft 7 in (1.70 m)
- Position: Right winger

Senior career*
Years	Team	Apps	(Gls)
?–1931	Manchester North End		
1931–1932	Bolton Wanderers		
1932–1935	Leeds United	3	(0)
1935–1940	Fulham	106	(15)
- * Club domestic league appearances and goals

Bert Worsley (20 September 1911 – 21 June 1971) was a professional footballer who played as a right-winger for Leeds United and Fulham F.C. Earlier in his career when he was playing for Manchester North End, in October 1931 he was signed as a professional by Bolton Wanderers.
