= Sonny Gibbon =

Welsh footballer

Personal information
- Date of birth: 9 January 1910
- Place of birth: Merthyr Tydfil, Wales
- Date of death: 8 April 1935 (aged 25)
- Place of death: Kent, England
- Position: Full back

Senior career*
Years	Team	Apps	(Gls)
	Aberdare Athletic	25	(0)
1929–1935	Fulham	127	(2)
- * Club domestic league appearances and goals

Samuel "Sonny" Gibbon (9 January 1910 – 8 April 1935) was a Welsh footballer who played as a defender for Fulham F.C. He made 127 appearances in League and Cup games for Fulham.

A native of Merthyr Tydfil, Gibbon started his career with Merthyr Town F.C., where his father was chairman. When the club ran into financial difficulties, he was signed by Aberdare Athletic, where he had 25 appearances. Fulham manager Joe Bradshaw paid £700 to transfer Gibbon to Craven Cottage as a fullback.

Gibbon made his Fulham debut in March 1929 in a match against Exeter City, which it won 4–1. That year, he had five more appearances, including a match against Swindon Town, which Fulham won 2–1, with one goal scored by Gibbon. He played regularly during the 1930–31 season.

The following season (1931–1932) under new manager James McIntyre was one of Fulham's most storied seasons. Gibbon was one of two fullbacks who played the most frequently that season, during which Fulham scored a record-setting 111 goals. He finished with a medal in the Football League Third Division South championship. On 9 May 1932, Gibbon scored a goal for Fulham during the London Challenge Cup final against Crystal Palace at Selhurst Park.

Following the club's promotion back to the Second Division, Gibbon played mainly for the Fulham reserve team, occasionally making first-team appearances when other players were injured.

In April 1935, he was killed in a motorbike accident near Deal in Kent, aged 25. Many of his teammates attended his funeral in Merthyr Tydfil, Wales, the day after losing 2–0 at Swansea Town.
