= Arthur Collins (cricketer) =

English cricketer

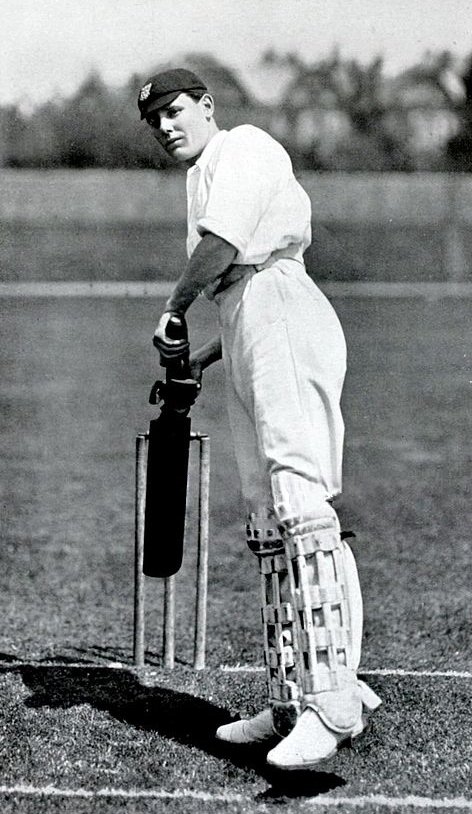

Personal information
- Born: 7 September 1871; East Grinstead, Sussex, England
- Died: 22 July 1945 (aged 73); Hadlow Down, Sussex, England
- Batting: Right-handed
- Bowling: Slow left-arm orthodox

Career statistics
Competition	First-class
Matches	53
Runs scored	1812
Batting average	25.52
100s/50s	1/9
Top score	102
Balls bowled	4030
Wickets	36
Bowling average	46.00
5 wickets in innings	1
10 wickets in match	0
Best bowling	5/61
Catches/stumpings	28/–
- Source: Cricinfo, 26 August 2021

Arthur Collins (7 September 1871 – 22 July 1945) was an English cricketer who played first-class cricket for Sussex between 1895 and 1902. He appeared in 53 first-class matches as a right-handed batsman who bowled left-arm orthodox spin.

An opening batsman, Collins made his only first-class century against Gloucestershire in June 1900, when he scored 22 and 102. Later that month, on a difficult pitch at Eastbourne, he batted for 195 minutes while top-scoring with 29 in a team total of 108 against Essex. He missed the 1901 season after contracting typhoid fever. In Sussex's two matches against Gloucestershire in 1896, he dismissed W. G. Grace twice with his spin bowling, though Grace scored 547 runs in the two matches.
