= Willie Walker (footballer, born 1891) =

English footballer

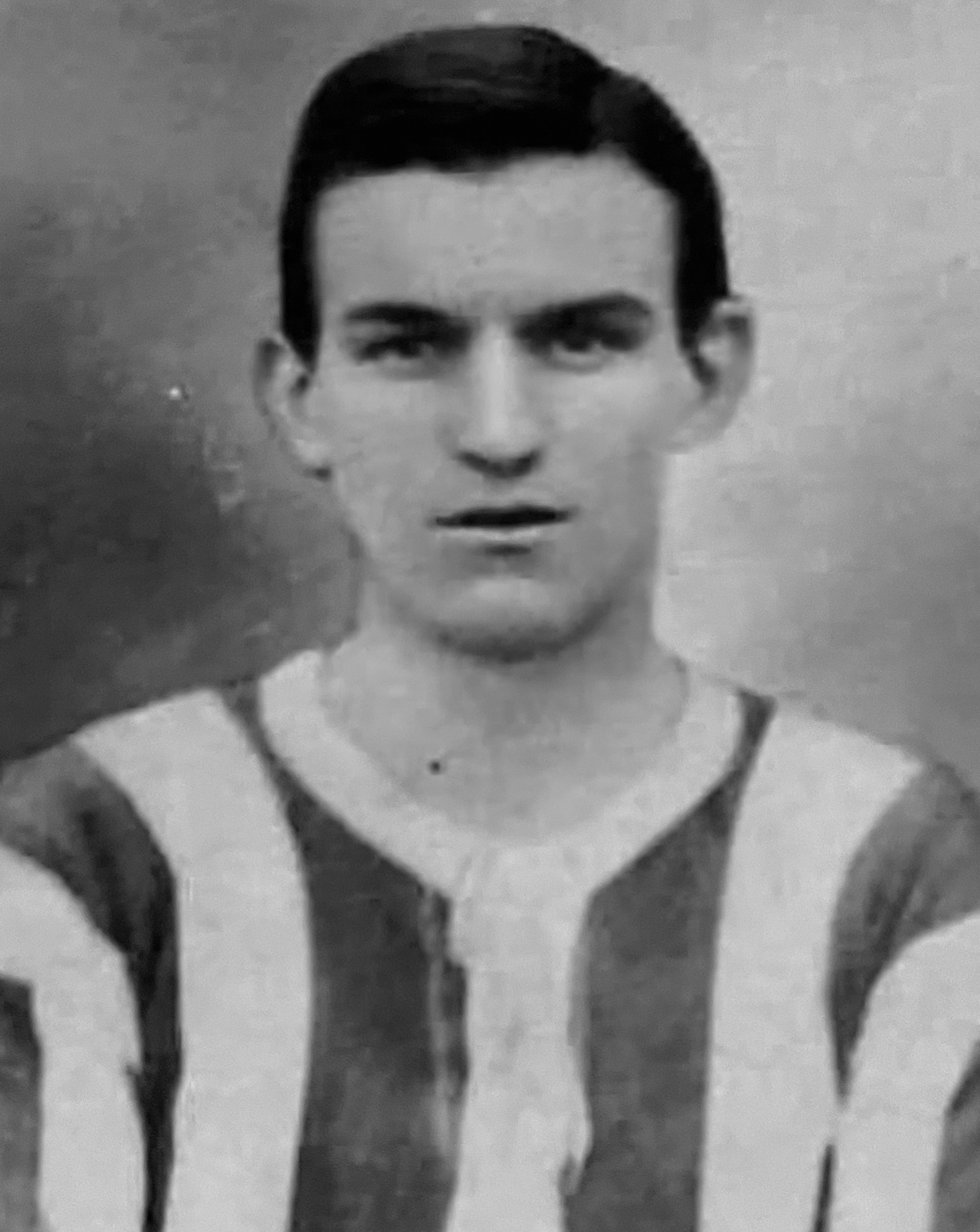
- Walker while with Fulham

Personal information
- Full name: William Burn Walker
- Date of birth: 1891
- Place of birth: Darlington, England
- Date of death: 1968 (aged 76–77)
- Height: 5 ft 8 in (1.73 m)
- Position: Outside left

Senior career*
Years	Team	Apps	(Gls)
- Darlington Albion
- Darlington
- Darlington St Augustine's
1909–1921	Fulham	168	(24)
1921–1922	Lincoln City	33	(5)
1923–1924	Lincoln City	3	(0)
- * Club domestic league appearances and goals

William Burn Walker (1891–1968) was an English professional footballer who played as an outside left in the Football League for Fulham and Lincoln City. He was the first Fulham player to receive a red card in a Football League match, versus Bradford City on 15 February 1913.

== Personal life ==
Walker served in the British Army during the First World War and saw service in Salonika, Egypt and Palestine. The malaria he contracted in Palestine hindered his football career. After the war, Walker married Bertha, the sister of former Fulham teammate Alf Marshall.

== Career statistics ==
Appearances and goals by club, season and competition
Club	Season	League			FA Cup		Total	
Club	Season	Division	Apps	Goals	Apps	Goals	Apps	Goals
Fulham	1914–15	Second Division	15	0	2	1	17	1
Career total			15	0	2	1	17	1
