= Worcester City F.C. =

Association football club in Worcester, Worcestershire, England

Coordinates: 52.2247°N 2.2121°W

Worcester City Football Club
- Full name: Worcester City Football Club
- Nicknames: City, The Blues, Faithful
- Founded: 1902; 124 years ago
- Ground: Sixways Stadium
- Capacity: 12,067
- Chairman: Steve Goode
- Manager: Chris Cornes
- League: Southern League Premier Division Central
- 2025–26: Southern League Premier Division Central, 9th of 22
Home colours	Away colours

Worcester City Football Club is an English football club based in Worcester, Worcestershire. The club play in the Southern Football League Premier Division Central, the seventh tier of English football. Established in 1902, the club play at Sixways Stadium.

Worcester City's most notable successes include an FA Cup first round victory against Coventry City and a third round win, in the same competition, against Liverpool.

== History ==
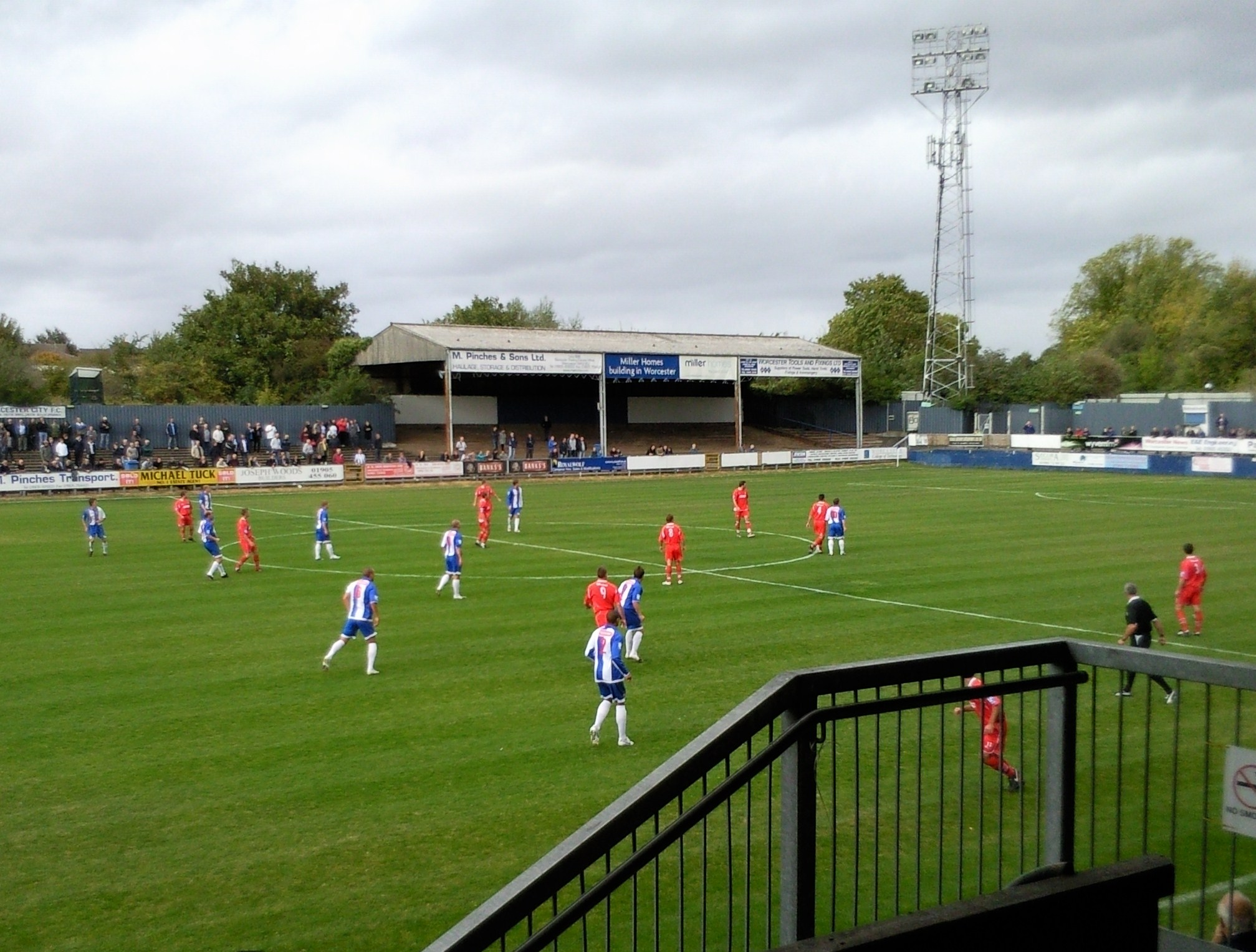
Worcester (blue and white shirts) in action against Dover Athletic in 2009 at St George's Lane, vacated in 2013 and later turned into a housing development

The club was formed on 9 September 1902 when, following the liquidation of another local side, Berwick Rangers, Worcester Rovers amalgamated taking the present name of Worcester City F. C. taking over Berwick's fixture list in the Birmingham & District League. Initially, they played on Pitchcroft on an enclosed area called Severn Terrace (behind the modern day Swan Theatre). They played there until the start of the 1905 season. It was in 1905 that they reached the first round of the FA Cup, losing 6–0 at home to Watford. In 1924–25, they won the league for the first time, and the following season reached the FA Cup first round again, losing 2–0 to Kettering Town in a second replay at St Andrew's. The club won back-to-back league titles in 1928–29 and 1929–30, also reaching the FA Cup first round in the former, losing 3–1 at Walsall.

In 1938, they joined the Southern League. In 1940, they won the Southern League Cup beating Chelmsford 7–3 over two legs under the guidance of former Fulham F.C. legend Syd Gibbons. During World War II, the club returned to the Birmingham & District League for two seasons.

After the war, Worcester rejoined the Southern League. In 1958–59, the club reached the first round of the FA Cup again. After beating Chelmsford City in a replay and then Millwall 5–2 in the second round, they were drawn against Liverpool. A 2–1 win saw Worcester qualify for the fourth round against Sheffield United. They were defeated 2–0 in front of a record home attendance of 17,042 at St George's Lane.

In 1973–74, the club were relegated to Division One North of the Southern League. They returned to the Premier Division as Division One champions in 1977, and in 1978–79, won the title. The following season they became founder members of the Alliance Premier League, finishing third in their first season. However, they were relegated at the end of the 1984–85 season.

The 1973–74 season saw City reach the quarter-final of the FA Trophy (reached 5 times in the club's history). They beat Taunton Town 1–0 away from home and then a 5–1 home win over Bletchley saw the club reach the third round. Having beaten Sandbach Ramblers 4–1, City progressed to the last eight where a 2–0 away defeat followed a goalless draw against South Shields ended their cup run. Also in 1973–74, Worcester played in the Welsh Cup for the first time, losing in the quarter-finals to Stourbridge In 1975–76 City were drawn against Shrewsbury Town in the quarter-finals at home and took them to a replay after a 2–2 draw, losing 3–0 in the replay. In the 1978–79 season, Worcester reached the semi-finals after beating Cardiff City 3–2 in the quarters. They again played Shrewsbury, this time losing 2–0 away.

The club remained in the Southern League Premier Division until 2004, when a fifth-placed finish earned them a place in the newly established Conference North. In 2008, they were moved to the Conference South after no southern teams were relegated from the Conference National. In 2009–10, they finished in the relegation zone, but were reprieved after several other clubs were demoted or folded – these clubs were all based in northern England so Worcester were transferred back to the Conference North.

On 9 November 2014, In the FA Cup first round, Worcester went to the Ricoh Arena and beat Coventry City 2–1. This earned them a second-round away tie against Scunthorpe United four weeks later. City secured a replay at Aggborough after a 1–1 draw, in which Daniel Nti equalised immediately after half-time with a strike into the roof of the net in front of the 2,200 travelling fans. The replay also finished 1–1 and, some 2 1/2 hours after kick-off, Scunthorpe won 14–13 on penalties, setting a record for the longest shoot-out in FA Cup history.

Worcester resigned from National League North towards the end of the 2016–17 season, but finished in one of the relegation places anyway. The FA then decided the club would be further relegated to the Midland League to ease the club's financial situation. The 2023–24 season saw Worcester promoted from the Hellenic Football League as champions, as well as reaching the semi-finals of the FA Vase. The following season saw the club achieve back-to-back promotions, defeating Corby Town in the play-off final.

== Stadium ==
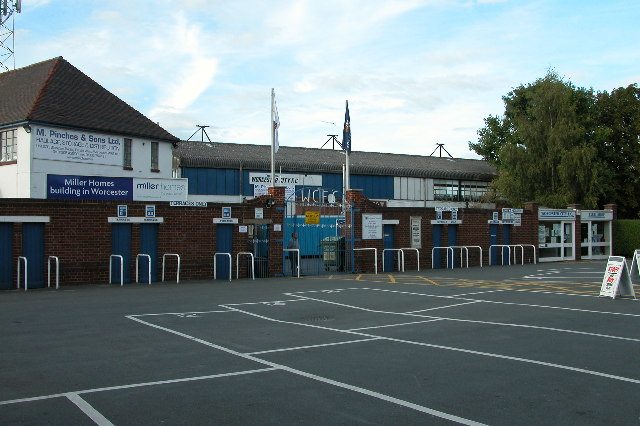
Entrance to St George's Lane

The club used to play at St George's Lane. The ground had four main areas; the Dressing Room End and the Canal End (which was used for away fans), the Main Stand (containing all 1,121 seats) and the Brookside Terrace, including The Shed. The capacity was 4,523.

The ground's record attendance is 17,042 from a fourth round FA Cup game against Sheffield United in 1959.

The ground was vacated in June 2013, as it has been sold to a housing developer. The sale of the ground was aimed at helping to fund the building of a new 6,000-capacity ground to be built at Nunnery Way on the edge of Worcester but the sale of the ground failed to provide sufficient finances to pay for such a stadium. On 30 January 2013, it was announced that Worcester would ground-share with Kidderminster Harriers at their Aggborough ground from the 2013–14 season.

Worcester City decided to terminate their arrangement with Kidderminster and move to Bromsgrove and groundshare the Victoria Ground with Bromsgrove Sporting from the start of the 2016–17 season.

=== New stadium ===
In 2013, previous plans for the club's new stadium to be built out of the city at Nunnery Way were shelved. The Worcester City Supporters' Trust have since tabled plans for a multi-use sporting facility on land currently occupied by Perdiswell Sports Centre, close to the city centre. Being a modest stadium with a capacity of 4,130, it would consist of a covered stand with 500 seats and two covered, terraced stands to hold 130 each (the capacity could be increased to 5,540 if tiered terraces are utilised). The proposal includes a full-size, all-weather and flood-lit artificial pitch, alongside three existing grass pitches. It would incorporate community facilities, in conjunction with the proposal of a new swimming pool. A full planning application was submitted to the City of Worcester Council and was rejected. New plans were drawn up for a new stadium at Parsonage Way, but this land was unfeasible.

In late 2019, it was announced that City would be returning to Worcester for the start of the 2020–21 season and playing at the Worcestershire FA headquarters at Claines Lane.

In November 2023, the club unveiled plans to move to a permanent home at a new Worcestershire Community Sports Park at Fernhill Heath, to the north of the city.

In January 2025, it was announced that Worcester City would move to the Sixways Stadium for the 2025–26 season. Worcester Raiders subsequently moved back to Claines Lane.

== Players ==
=== Current squad ===
Note: Flags indicate national team as defined under FIFA eligibility rules; some limited exceptions apply. Players may hold more than one non-FIFA nationality.

No.	Pos.	Nation	Player
—	GK	POL	Cristiano Dzialuk
—	DF	ENG	Charlie Wise
—	DF	ENG	Luke Ward
—	DF	ENG	Mitchell Roberts
—	DF	ENG	Josh Ezewele
—	DF	ENG	Duncan Idehen
—	MF	WAL	Josh Taroni
—	MF	ENG	Elliott Hartley
—	MF	ENG	Nathan Hayward
—	MF	ENG	Harry Burns

No.	Pos.	Nation	Player
—	MF	ENG	Luke Rowe
—	MF	ENG	Matt Richards
—	MF	ENG	Liam Lockett
—	MF	ENG	Kyle Clayton
—	MF	POR	Miro Pais
—	MF	ENG	Ryan McLean
—	FW	ENG	Brandon Smalley
—	FW	ENG	Zac Guinan
—	FW	ENG	Charlie Lutz
—	FW	ENG	Fabian Salmon

== Management and coaching staff ==
=== Current staff ===
Position	Name
Manager	Chris Cornes
Assistant Manager	Thomas Milward
Coach	Nick Clayton
Football Secretary	Kevin Preece
Physio	Abi Wells
Kit Manager	Dave Boddy

== Managerial history ==
List of Worcester City F.C. managers
Image	Name	Nationality	From	To	P	W	D	L	GF	GA	Win%	Honours	Notes
	Frank Womack	England	May 1928	July 1930	0	0	0	0	0	0	—		
	Joe Smith	England	1930	1932	0	0	0	0	0	0	—		
	Alex Hair	Scotland	1932	1934	0	0	0	0	0	0	—		
	Jack Whitehouse	England	1934	1935	0	0	0	0	0	0	—		
	Frank Keetley	England	1935	1936	0	0	0	0	0	0	—		
	Jack Russell	England	1936	1937	0	0	0	0	0	0	—		
	Syd Wallington	England	1937	1938	0	0	0	0	0	0	—		
	Syd Gibbons	England	1938	1946	0	0	0	0	0	0	—		
	Bob Jackson	England	1946	1947	0	0	0	0	0	0	—		
	Jack Vinall	England	1947	1950	0	0	0	0	0	0	—		
	Percy Percy	England	1950	1953	0	0	0	0	0	0	—		
	Bill Jones	England	1953	1957	0	0	0	0	0	0	—		
	Roy Paul	Wales	1957	1958	0	0	0	0	0	0	—		
	Bill Thompson	Scotland	1958	1962	0	0	0	0	0	0	—		
	Danny McLennan	Scotland	1962	1962	0	0	0	0	0	0	—		
	Bill Jones	England	1962	1968	0	0	0	0	0	0	—		
	Eddie Stuart	South Africa	1968	December 1971	0	0	0	0	0	0	—		
	Wilf Grant	England	December 1971	1973	0	0	0	0	0	0	—		
	Graham Newton	England	1973	1973	0	0	0	0	0	0	—		
	Bill Jackman	England	1973	July 1974	0	0	0	0	0	0	—		
	Ronnie Radford	England	July 1974	1975	0	0	0	0	0	0	—		
	Nobby Clark	England	1975	1984	0	0	0	0	0	0	—		
	Bobby Shinton	England	1984	1984	0	0	0	0	0	0	—		
	George Armstrong	England	1984	1985	0	0	0	0	0	0	—		
	Ian Cooper	England	1985	1986	0	0	0	0	0	0	—		
	John Jones	England	1986	1986	0	0	0	0	0	0	—		
	George Rooney	England	1986	1989	0	0	0	0	0	0	—		
	Dave Boddy	England	1989	1989	0	0	0	0	0	0	—		
	Steve Fergusson	England	1989	1990	0	0	0	0	0	0	—		
	Ally Robertson	Scotland	1990	1991	0	0	0	0	0	0	—		
	Martyn Bennett	England	1991	1992	0	0	0	0	0	0	—		
	George Rooney	England	1992	1998	0	0	0	0	0	0	—		
	Graham Allner	England	1998	1999	0	0	0	0	0	0	—		
	John Barton	England	1999	January 2005	0	0	0	0	0	0	—		
	Richard Dryden	England	November 2007	17 January 2010	0	0	0	0	0	0	—		
	Carl Heeley	England	13 March 2010	2017	0	0	0	0	0	0	—		
	Ashley Vincent	England	2019	2020	0	0	0	0	0	0			
	Tim Harris	England	2021	2022	0	0	0	0	0	0			

== Records ==
- Largest victory: 19–1 vs Bilston, Birmingham League, 21 November 1931
- Heaviest defeat: 0–19 vs Wellington Town, Birmingham League, 29 August 1920
- Highest attendance: 17042 vs Sheffield United, FA Cup, 24 January 1959
- Highest transfer fee received: £27,500 for John Barton to Everton, 1979
- Highest transfer fee paid: £10,000 for Jai Stanley from Moor Green, 2003
- All-time goalscorer: John Inglis (189, 1970–77)
- Most appearances: Bobby McEwan (596, 1959–75)
- Youngest scorer: Sam Wedgbury, aged 16 versus Bemerton Heath Harlequins, FA Cup, 2005

=== Cup records ===
- Best FA Cup performance: Fourth round, 1958–59
- Best FA Trophy performance: Quarter-finals, 1969–70, 1973–74 (replay), 1980–81, 1981–82
- Best FA Vase performance: Semi-finals, 2023–24
- Best Welsh Cup performance: Semi-finals, 1978–79

== Honours ==
- Birmingham & District league
  - Winners: 1913–14, 1924–25, 1928–29, 1929–30
  - Runners-up: 1931–32, 1932–33, 1933–34
- Southern League Western Section
  - Runners-up: 1939–40
- Southern League Division One North
  - Winners: 1967–68, 1976–77
- Southern League Premier
  - Winners: 1978–79
- Northern Premier League Division One Midlands
  - Play-off winners: 2024–25
- Hellenic Football League
  - Winners: 2023–24
- Football Conference (Alliance Premier League)
  - Third place: 1979–80
- Southern League Cup
  - Winners: 1940, 2001
- Worcestershire Senior Cup
  - Winners: 28 times
- Staffordshire Senior Cup
  - Winners: 1976–77
