= James Tompkins (Australian rules footballer) =

Australian rules footballer

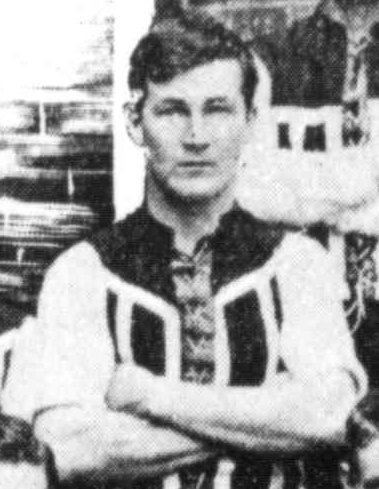

Personal information
- Full name: James John Tompkins
- Nickname: Jimmy

Playing career
Years	Club	Games (Goals)
1895–1908	Port Adelaide	147 (151)

James Tompkins was an Australian rules footballer for Port Adelaide. In a match against West Adelaide at Alberton Oval in 1903 he kicked 15 goals (3 behinds). This feat would remain the club record until 1980 when Tim Evans kicked 16 goals, also in a match against West Adelaide.
