= Arthur W. Collins =

American football player (1890–1970)

Biographical details
- Born: September 26, 1890; Chiang Mai, Siam
- Died: August 19, 1970 (aged 79); Berea, Ohio, U.S.

Playing career
- 1910–1912: Wooster

Coaching career (HC unless noted)
- 1914–1916: Geneva HS (OH)
- 1917–1918: Painesville HS (OH)
- 1919–1924: Lorain HS (OH)
- 1924–1927: Baldwin–Wallace

Administrative career (AD unless noted)
- 1924–1928: Baldwin–Wallace

Head coaching record
- Overall: 11–19–2 (college)

Arthur Worth Collins (September 26, 1890 – August 19, 1970) was an American college football player and coach. The son of a pastor, he was born in Siam (presently Thailand) and served as the head football at Baldwin Wallace University in Berea, Ohio from 1924 to 1927, compiling a record of 11–19–2.

== Head coaching record ==
=== College ===
| Year | Team | Overall | Conference | Standing | Bowl/playoffs |
|---|---|---|---|---|---|
Baldwin–Wallace Yellow Jackets (Ohio Athletic Conference) (1924–1927)
| 1924 | Baldwin–Wallace | 1–7 | 1–4 | T–17th | |
| 1925 | Baldwin–Wallace | 5–3 | 5–3 | 7th | |
| 1926 | Baldwin–Wallace | 3–3–2 | 3–3–2 | 13th | |
| 1927 | Baldwin–Wallace | 2–6 | 2–6 | T–15th | |
| Baldwin–Wallace: | | 11–19–2 | 11–16–2 | | |
| Total: | | 11–19–2 | | | |
