= Bruce Clarke (soccer) =

South African soccer player

Personal information
- Full name: Bruce Mitchell Clarke
- Date of birth: 4 October 1910
- Place of birth: Johannesburg, South Africa
- Height: 6 ft 0 in (1.83 m)
- Position: Right half

Senior career*
Years	Team	Apps	(Gls)
- Hillside Juniors
1928	Montrose		
1928–1934	Third Lanark	112	(13)
1934–1938	Fulham	112	(1)
- Worcester City
- * Club domestic league appearances and goals

Bruce Mitchell Clarke (born 4 October 1910, date of death unknown) was a football player who played as a right half for Fulham in the Football League. He also played in England for Worcester City and in Scotland for Hillside Juniors, Montrose and Third Lanark (where he won the Scottish Division Two title in 1930–31 and was selected for two editions of the Glasgow Football Association's annual challenge match against Sheffield.)

Clarke's grandson Chad Perris is an international para-athlete for Australia.
