= Reg Dyer =

English footballer

Personal information
- Full name: Reginald Ernest Dyer
- Date of birth: April 18, 1900
- Place of birth: Bristol, England
- Date of death: Registered: January 1990 (Age 89)
- Place of death: Harlow, England
- Height: 5 ft 10 in (1.78 m)
- Position: Full back

Senior career*
Years	Team	Apps	(Gls)
–1920	Ashton City		
1920–1925	Bristol City	49	(0)
1925–1930	Fulham	98	(0)
1930	Yeovil and Petters United		
1930	Moules (France)		
1930	Bath City (non-contract)		
1931–1932	Tunbridge Wells Rangers		
1932	Ashford (trial)		
- * Club domestic league appearances and goals

Reg Dyer (1900–1990) was an English footballer who played as a defender. He played a total of 147 matches in the Football League for Bristol City and Fulham.

== Career ==
Dyer had been playing in the Bristol Downs League with Ashton City when in 1920 he joined Bristol City. He made his league debut on 18 February 1922 in a Second Division match, a 1–0 defeat to Sheffield Wednesday, in what was his only appearance that season, after which Bristol City relegated. The club bounced straight back as 1922–23 season Division Three South champions with Dyer playing in 17 league matches. He played a similar number the following season as Bristol City were again relegated and after 14 appearances in the following 1924–25 season Dyer, who had never established himself as a regular starter, was signed in the summer of 1925 by Fulham of the Second Division.

Dyer played in 80 league matches during his first 3 seasons in the Second Division with Fulham before they were relegated at the end of the 1927–28 season. Playing with Fulham in the Division Three South he made 17 appearances in the 1928–29 season and only one more appearance during the next campaign after which he was not retained by the club.

In September 1930 Dyer moved into non-league football when he was reported as joining Western League club Yeovil and Petters United. In December 1930 Dyer played for Southern League Bath City's reserve team whilst attached to the Army at Aldershot and had previously played in France with Moules. His next club in England was Tunbridge Wells Rangers of the Kent League for the 1931–32 season. In late 1932 Dyer played on a trial basis with another Kent League club Ashford.
