= Arthur D. Collins Jr. =

American businessman

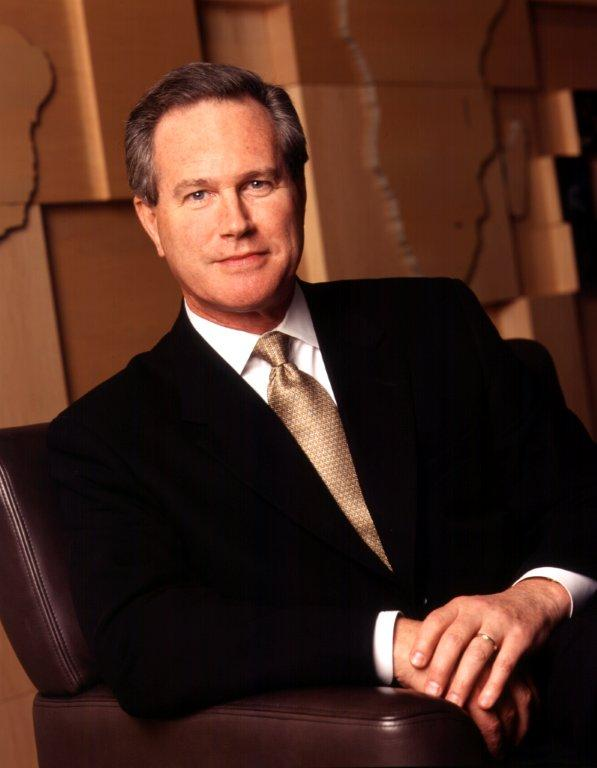
- Born: 1947 (age 78–79); Lakewood, Ohio
- Education: Miami University; University of Pennsylvania
- Occupation: Businessman
- Notable work: The Adventures of Archibald and Jockabeb

Arthur D. Collins Jr. is an American executive, the retired chairman of the board of Medtronic, Inc., and formerly served the company as president and chief executive officer. He is now a senior advisor to Oak Hill Capital Partners and a managing partner at Acorn Advisors, LLC. Collins is also the author of the children's book series The Adventures of Archibald and Jockabeb.

== Early life and education ==
Collins was born in 1947 in Lakewood, Ohio, to his parents Arthur D. Collins Sr. and Irene Collins. His father was a physician, and encouraged him to pursue a different path if medicine was not for him.

Collins received a Bachelor of Science degree in 1969 and a Doctor of Laws honorary degree from Miami University in Oxford, Ohio, in 2006.

Collins also holds a Master of Business Administration Degree from the Wharton School of the University of Pennsylvania, graduating in 1973.

== Career ==
Prior to his business career, he served as an officer in the US Navy, and taught naval sciences at his alma mater, the University of Pennsylvania. He worked as a consultant for Booz Allen Hamilton, an executive at Abbott Laboratories, and as an executive at Medtronic Inc. from 1992 to 2007, stepping down as CEO. Prior to this role he served as president and COO of the company. He joined Oak Hill Capital Partners as a senior advisor in 2009. In 2016 he formed the consulting firm Acorn Advisors, LLC, with Sophia Shaw.

== Board, civic and community activities ==
Collins serves on the board of directors of Alcoa, The Boeing Company, Cargill, and U.S. Bancorp, where he is the lead director. He is a member of the Board of Overseers of the Wharton School at the University of Pennsylvania. He was chairman of AdvaMed, the medical technology industry association.

== Books ==
Collins is the author of the children's book series The Adventures of Archibald and Jockabeb, the profits from which he donates to educational charities.

Business positions
Preceded by William W. George	CEO of Medtronic; 2001–2007	Succeeded by
