= Maurice Cook =

English footballer and cricketer

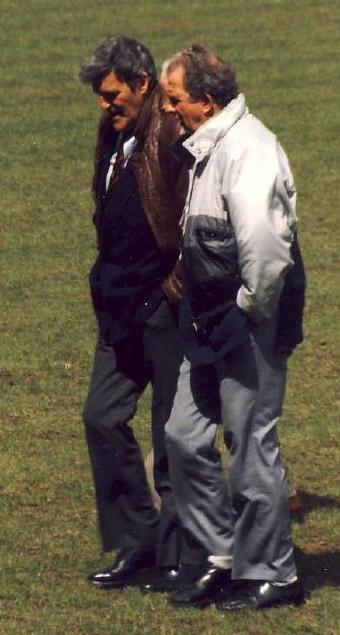
- Cook (right) with former Fulham team-mate Jimmy Hill

Personal information
- Date of birth: 10 December 1931
- Place of birth: Hemel Hempstead, Hertfordshire
- Date of death: 31 December 2006 (aged 75)
- Position: Striker

Youth career
- Hertfordshire schools

Senior career*
Years	Team	Apps	(Gls)
- Potten End
- Berkhamsted Town
1952–1958	Watford	208	(68)
1958–1965	Fulham	221	(89)
1965–1966	Reading	12	(2)
1966–1967	Banbury United (player-coach)		
- * Club domestic league appearances and goals

Maurice Cook (10 December 1931 – 31 December 2006) was an English professional association footballer, and also an amateur cricketer for Hertfordshire. Capable of playing in any outfield position, Cook spent the majority of his career as a centre forward. He was best known for his spells at Football League clubs Watford and Fulham. He also played for Berkhamsted Town and Reading, and finished his playing career with a season as player-coach of Banbury United, in the Southern League. In 1960, Cook scored the first ever goal in the Football League Cup.

== Early career and Watford ==
Born and raised in Hemel Hempstead, Cook played for Hertfordshire as a schoolboy, and later for local sides Potten End and Berkhamsted Town.

Cook joined Football League Third Division South side Watford as an amateur in 1952, turning professional at the end of the 1952–53 season. He made his debut in Watford's first game of the following campaign, away to Southampton on 19 August 1953. His first professional goal came exactly one month later, giving Watford a 1–0 win at Coventry City. Playing 45 of a possible 47 games, Cook finished 1953–54 with nine goals as Watford ended the season fourth in the division.

Although Cook's strike rate was poor compared with other forwards in the team, manager Len Goulden kept faith with him for the following campaign. One of three players to play in all 50 of Watford's fixtures, he finished as the club's top scorer with 31 goals in all competitions, more than twice as many as his nearest competitor—and the previous season's top scorer—Roy Brown. Cook scored 15 and 16 goals in 1955–56 and 1956–57 respectively, and amassed 10 goals in 30 Watford games in the first half of 1957–58. Between his debut and his final appearance, Cook made 218 appearances in the Football League and FA Cup, scoring 77 goals and missing only four games.

== Fulham and later life ==
Widely regarded by fans as Watford's best player at the time, Cook was sold to Second Division side Fulham in January 1958 for £15,000, which at the time was the highest fee Watford had ever received. He played regularly for the rest of the season, but having played for Watford in the FA Cup, was unable to contribute to Fulham's run to the semi finals. Nonetheless, Cook played a central part in 1958–59, scoring 17 of Fulham's 96 goals as they gained promotion to the First Division for only the second time in their history.

Fulham survived the following season, and on 26 September 1960, Cook became the first player ever to score a goal in the Football League Cup. Cook remained a First Division Fulham player until 1965, with a goalscoring record of 89 goals in 229 league games. Among his teammates during this period were England internationals George Cohen and Johnny Haynes. Shortly after the departure of manager Bedford Jezzard in December 1964, Cook transferred to Reading in the Third Division. After playing only 12 league games for them, he took up a post as player-coach at Banbury United. Under the management of his former Watford boss Len Goulden, Cook helped Banbury reach the Southern League for the first time in their history.

Cook died on 31 December 2006, aged 75. Coincidentally, the following day Fulham hosted Watford in a league match at Craven Cottage, where both sets of supporters observed a minute's silence in his honour.
