= Syd Gibbons =

English footballer (1907–1953)

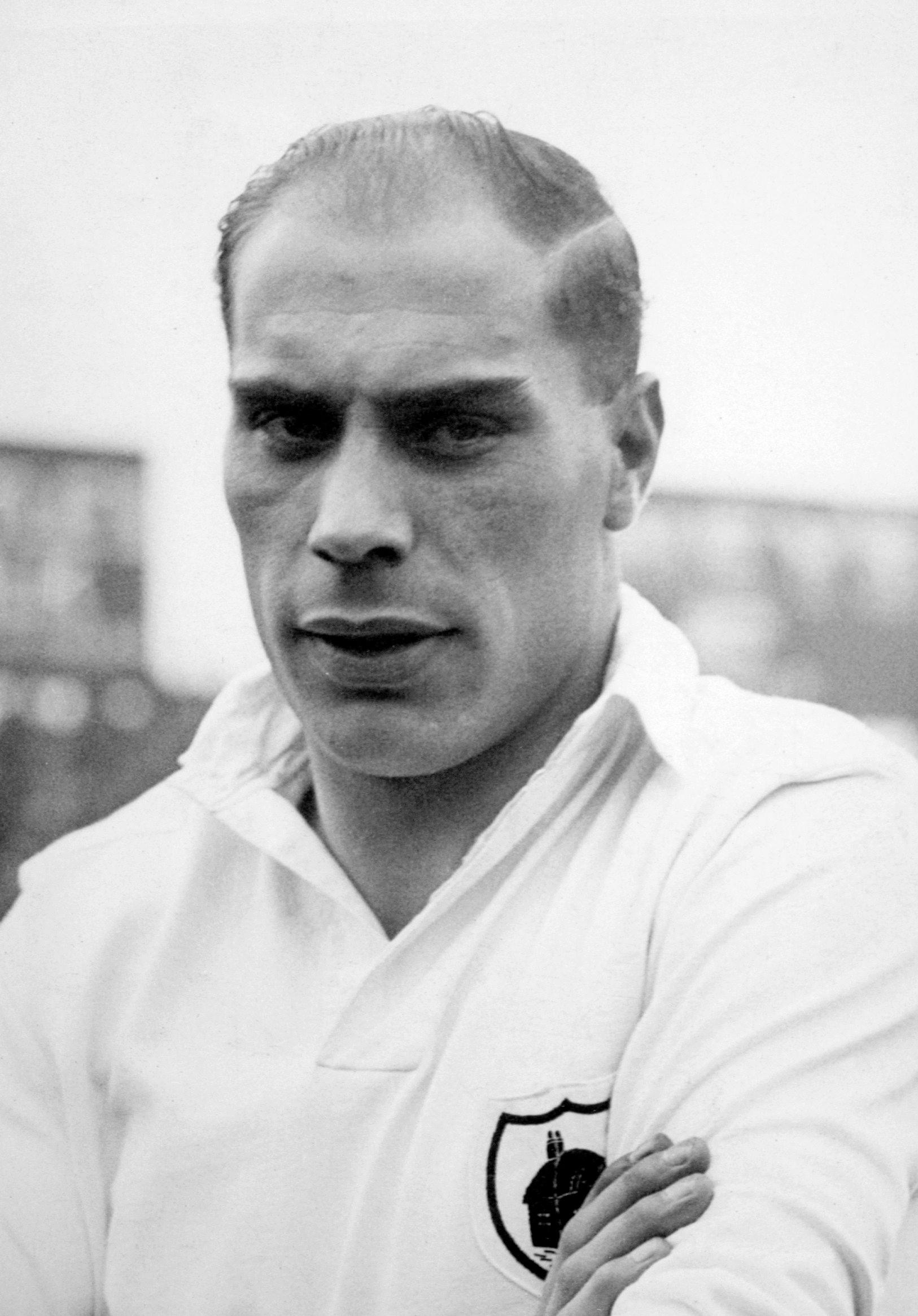
Syd Gibbons with Fulham.

Syd Gibbons (24 March 1907 – 17 July 1953) was a professional footballer in the 1930s.

== Career ==
=== Early career ===
Gibbons started his football career with Birmingham School Boys, before going on to sign for Wolverhampton Wanderers who played in the Third Division North, as an amateur in March 1924. On 9 December 1924, he was signed on professional forms for £2-10-0 per week, he made several reserve team appearances but never made the first team.

In April 1925 he was granted a free transfer and joined Walsall who also played in Third Division North in the summer of 1925. He went on to play four games for the first-team in 1925–26 (v Grimsby in August 1925, v Halifax on Boxing Day 1925 and v Chesterfield and New Brighton, both in February 1926).

At the end of the 1925–26 season he was released and joined the now defunct Cradley Heath in the Birmingham League, at the time one of the strongest leagues outside the Football League, and won the Worcestershire Senior cup with them in that season.

It is commonly thought that he also represented England Juniors v Scotland in 1927. He did not in fact represent England at any level. He represented Birmingham County Football Association (known wrongly in some quarters as England Juniors) who played an annual match against Scotland Juniors, it was popularly known as the Junior International.

On 14 April 1927, he was signed by Manchester City for a transfer fee of £400. In his first season City won the 2nd Division and he made five first team appearances. In his next two seasons with City in the First Division he only made a further six first team appearances.

=== Fulham ===
On 12 May 1930, he was transferred to Fulham, who played in the Third Division for £400.00.

He soon became a first team regular and along with Len Oliver and Albert Barrett, he formed a superb half back line, which helped win the Third Division title in 1931–32 season, being the only ever present in that season. He was also an ever-present the following season when they just missed promotion to the First Division of the football league, finishing third behind Stoke City and Tottenham.

He played all the games in their famous F.A. Cup run in 1936, beating First Division sides Chelsea and Derby County before finally losing in the semi-final to Sheffield United.

He became a Fulham legend and was known as "Carnera" because of his imposing physique – he stood 5 ft 11 in (1.80 m) in height and weighed 13 stone (180 lb; 83 kg) – and similarity to Primo Carnera, the Italian world heavyweight boxing champion.

On 3 November 1934, in an amazing home match. Fulham were 3–0 down, against Southampton with 15 minutes to play. Syd, saved the day, by scoring a hat-trick, to earn a 3–3 draw. He is the only Fulham defender to score a hat-trick in open play.

He played for Fulham from 1930 to 1938 and made 318 appearances (including 299 league appearances). This places him in the top 20 of all-time appearance holders for Fulham.

=== Later career ===
After leaving Fulham, he moved on to the Southern League Worcester City F.C. as player-manager in 1938. His major success came in 1940 winning the Southern League Cup, in a two-legged final against Chelmsford 7–3 on aggregate. They also won the Worcestershire Senior Cup in the same season. Further cup success followed in 1941. He remained them until 1942 when senior football stopped, due to the second world war. He briefly returned in 1946 as club secretary.

Syd went on to run a newsagents in Putney and worked part-time for Fulham after the war ended, as a scout, but died aged 47 on 17 July 1953.

== Career statistics ==
Appearances and goals by club, season and competition
Club	Season	League		FA Cup	
Club	Season	Apps	Goals	Apps	Goals
Fulham	1930–31	32	0	3	2
Fulham	1931–32	42	0	5	0
Fulham	1932–33	42	3	1	0
Fulham	1933–34	38	3	2	0
Fulham	1934–35	42	5	1	0
Fulham	1935–36	39	1	6	0
Fulham	1936–37	42	1	1	0
Fulham	1937–38	22	0	0	0
Fulham	Total	299	13	19	2
