= Murder of Arthur Collins =

1965 murder in New York City

- Date: October 9, 1965
- Location: 125th Street station East Harlem, New York; 40.804259°N 73.937473°W
- Type: Murder
- Cause: Stabbing
- Target: Arthur Collins
- Perpetrator: Jose Antonio Saldana
- Outcome: Creation of the NY Crime Victims Compensation Board
- Deaths: 1
- Arrests: 1
- Convictions: 1

Arthur F. Collins (1937 – October 9, 1965) was a 28-year-old man who was murdered in a New York City subway after defending two women who were being assaulted by an intoxicated man. Soon after his murder, his wife obtained employment, but in order to work, she had to send their infant daughter to live with her relatives in Europe. Less than two months after Collins's wife was widowed, public outcry resulted in New York City Mayor Wagner signing a "good Samaritan" bill into law. In August 1966, New York State Governor Nelson Rockefeller signed into law a bill that would provide state compensation to eligible crime victims. Rockefeller stated that the law was a direct response to Collins's murder. This legislation led to the establishment of New York State Office of Victims Services, an agency dedicated to providing compensation to all innocent victims of all crimes.

== Murder ==
On the evening of October 9, 1965, Arthur Collins, accompanied by his wife Christine and their 15-month-old daughter Patricia, were returning home after visiting his uncle in the Bronx. As they boarded a southbound subway at 149th Street, a young man, later described as around 20 years old and intoxicated, got on at the same time. Once on the train, he stepped on the foot of an elderly woman and leaned against another, all while shouting obscenities. Collins, who noticed the women were too scared to confront their harasser, asked the man to leave the train as they approached the 125th Street station. The man disregarded Collins and kept cursing while Collins handed his daughter to his wife, then stepped toward the assailant, yanked him to his feet, and hurled him onto the subway platform. The man immediately re-entered the train, drew a switchblade, and stabbed Collins in the chest before fleeing. Collins staggered out of the train, which still had not left the station, and collapsed on the platform. Within minutes, he died in front of his wife and child. The murder occurred less than an hour before the Transit Authority's anticrime patrol were to begin their shift.

=== Investigation and arrest ===
A combined 200 New York City and Transit Authority police officers searched the subway and neighborhood surrounding the 125th Street station for the killer. Meanwhile, Collins's widow and several witnesses assisted in the creation of the killer's facial composite.

Four days after the murder, Esli Ramon Gonzalez, a reporter for the Spanish language newspaper, El Diario, received an anonymous phone call that led Gonzalez to the suspected killer's uncle. With the uncle's assistance, Gonzalez was brought to the Bronx residence of 20-year-old Jose Antonio Saldana. The two men persuaded Saldana to surrender himself to police. From a lineup, Collins's widow immediately identified Saldana as her husband's killer. He was arrested and held without bail.

The day following Saldana's arrest was supposed to be his last day of work at Crown Die Casting Corp. He had quit his job with the intention of moving back to Puerto Rico. On November 11, 1966, Saldana pled guilty to the murder of Collins and he was sentenced 20 years to life in prison on December 12, 1966. During sentencing, State Supreme Court Justice Charles Marks stated, "more stringent regulations are needed for people from Puerto Rico." Saldana was released from prison on August 11, 1983.

== Aftermath ==
While employed as a computer programmer for Pan American Airways, Collins was paid an annual salary of $6,000, but without life insurance, his wife was left without income to support herself and their child. In an effort to assist, Pan American employed her at their data processing unit with the payrate of $90 per week. However, in order to work, Christine, was forced to send her daughter to live with her mother in her hometown of Lehrberg, Germany.

On December 2, 1965, Christine testified at a public hearing before a New York State joint legislative committee, stating that financial compensation, "would go far in easing at least my financial loss and in bringing me and my daughter back together again." This testimony contributed to a growing public outcry for the assistance of Christine and her child.

The City of New York passed a bill on December 29, 1965 that would award financial assistance, determined by New York City Board of Estimate, to the families of those hurt or killed while assisting a victim of a violent crime.

The New York State Senate passed a bill on July 5, 1966, that would allow innocent victims of crime to receive as much as $15,000 in compensation from the state. State Assembly Minority Leader, Moses Weinstein, who sponsored the bill, said, "For the first time, the state recognizes that it has a responsibility to be interested in what happens to the victim of a crime."

Weinstein's bill was signed into law by Governor Rockefeller on August 1, 1966, creating the Crime Victims Compensation Board. During the board's first year of existence, it accepted 196 claims. The board eventually transitioned into what is now Office of Victim Services, a state agency that provides compensation to all eligible victims of crime and helps fund programs throughout the state that provide services to crime victims.

On October 14, 1966, a year and five days after Arthur Collins's murder, the Board of Estimate approved an annual compensation of $4,420 to his widow. The payments were to be paid retroactively (from the date of the murder) for the rest of her life or until she remarried. Christine Collins was the first person in New York State to be awarded victim compensation.
