= Ted Charlton (footballer, born 1888) =

English footballer

Personal information
- Full name: Edward Charlton
- Date of birth: 15 January 1888
- Place of birth: Southwick, Hampshire, England
- Date of death: 20 January 1978 (aged 90)
- Height: 5 ft 10 1/2 in (1.79 m)
- Position: Full back

Senior career*
| Years | Team | Apps | (Gls) |
| 1906–1920 | Fulham | 249 | (7) |
| 1921–1923 | Carlisle United | | |
- * Club domestic league appearances and goals

Edward Charlton (15 January 1888 – 20 January 1978) was an English footballer who played for Fulham and Carlisle United as a full back.

== Career ==
He spent the majority of his career at Fulham, making 249 league appearances and scoring 7 goals between 1906 and 1920, becoming the first player to make 100 appearances for the club. He spent the final couple of playing years at Carlisle United before announcing his retirement in 1923.

== Personal life ==
Charlton worked at J.L. Thompson and Sons during the First World War. He died in 1978 at 90 years old.
