= Alf Marshall (footballer, born 1888) =

English footballer

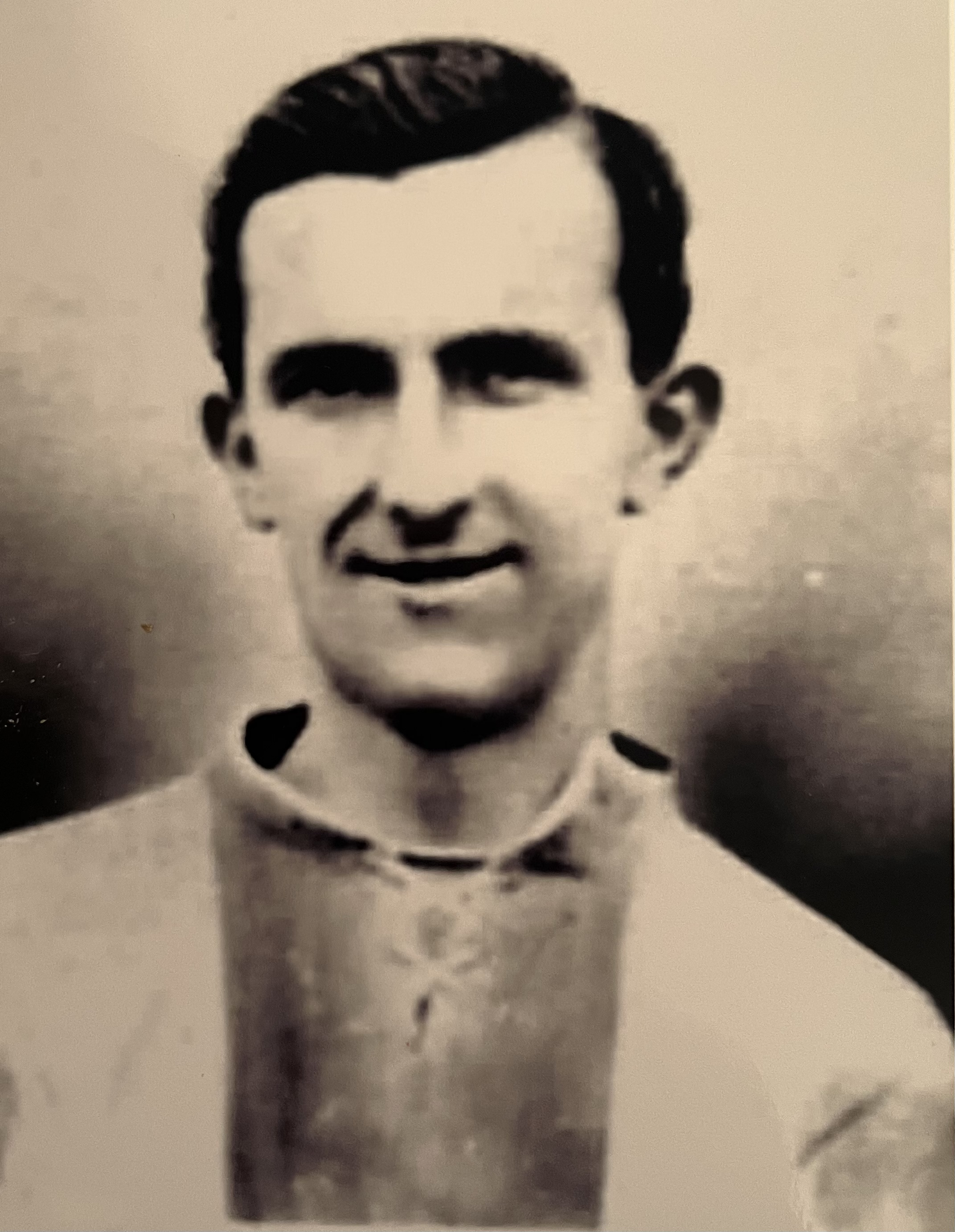

Personal information
- Full name: Alfred Willis Marshall
- Date of birth: 9 January 1888
- Place of birth: Darlington, England
- Date of death: 1923 (aged 34–35)
- Height: 5 ft 8 1/2 in (1.74 m)
- Position: Wing-half

Senior career*
| Years | Team | Apps | (Gls) |
| 1906–1907 | Darlington St John's | | |
| 1907–1909 | Darlington St Augustine's | | |
| 1909–1920 | Fulham | 100 | (0) |
| 1920–1923 | Oldham Athletic | 66 | (3) |
| Total | | 166 | (3) |
- * Club domestic league appearances and goals

Alfred Willis Marshall (9 January 1888–1923) was an English footballer who played in the Football League for Fulham and Oldham Athletic. Brother-in-law to Willie Walker (footballer, born 1891)
