= Jim Hammond (footballer) =

English sportsperson (1907–1985)

Personal information
- Full name: Herbert Edward Hammond
- Date of birth: 2 November 1907
- Place of birth: Brighton, England
- Date of death: 16 June 1985 (aged 77)
- Height: 6 ft 1 1/2 in (1.87 m)
- Position: Forward

Senior career*
Years	Team	Apps	(Gls)
1928–1938	Fulham		

International career
1932	England amateur	1	(0)
- * Club domestic league appearances and goals

Herbert Edward "Jim" Hammond (7 November 1907 – 16 June 1985) was an English professional footballer who played as a forward. After playing non-League football for Lewes, he signed for Football League side Fulham. He became a prolific goalscorer for the club, scoring 150 goals which remained a club record until the 1950s. He also played cricket for Sussex, appearing in 196 matches.

== Career ==
Born in Brighton, Hammond was a noted sportsman from a young age and represented the county of Sussex in football at the age of 16.

He began his senior career with non-league club Lewes, before signing for Football League Third Division South side Fulham in 1928.

Hammond played for Fulham between 1928 and 1938, scoring 150 goals in 342 games. He was once called up for duty with the national team, but was left out of the side for an international friendly match against Austria. When he retired, it was forced on him by injury. His nickname was "the galloping hairpin".

He meanwhile had a batting average of 18.73 (4,251 runs) and a bowling average of 28.71 (428 wickets), and became an umpire in his retirement.
