= Arthur Collins (footballer, born 1882) =

English footballer

Personal information
- Date of birth: 29 May 1882
- Place of birth: Chesterfield, England
- Date of death: 6 February 1953 (aged 70)
- Height: 5 ft 8 1/2 in (1.74 m)
- Positions: Full back; centre back

Youth career
- Leicester City

Senior career*
Years	Team	Apps	(Gls)
1901–1905	Leicester City		
1905–1914	Fulham	260	(9)
1914–1915	Norwich City		
1915–1917	Leicester City		
- * Club domestic league appearances and goals

Arthur "Pat" Collins (29 May 1882 – 6 February 1953) was an English footballer who played as a defender for Leicester City, Fulham and Norwich City in a career spanning sixteen years from 1901 to 1917.

Collins began in the youth team at Leicester City, progressing to first team action in 1901. Four years later he moved to London to represent Fulham, where he spent nine years and pulled on their shirt 279 times, scoring 11 goals.

In 1914, Collins went to East Anglia to play for Norwich City. He spent only a year with the club before he went back to Leicester to see out the last couple of years of his career. He retired from football in 1917.

He died in 1953, aged 70.
