= Bedford Jezzard =

English footballer

Personal information
- Full name: Bedford Alfred George Jezzard
- Date of birth: 19 October 1927
- Place of birth: Clerkenwell, England
- Date of death: 21 May 2005 (aged 77)
- Place of death: Alton, England
- Position: Forward

Youth career
- Croxley Boys

Senior career*
Years	Team	Apps	(Gls)
1944–1945	Watford	0	(0)
1948–1957	Fulham	292	(154)

International career
1954–1955	England	2	(0)
1954–1955	England B	3	(6)

Managerial career
- 1958–1964: Fulham
- * Club domestic league appearances and goals

Bedford Alfred George Jezzard (19 October 1927 – 21 May 2005) was an English footballer. Jezzard's teenage years coincided with the Second World War, and he began football as an amateur with Croxley Boys and later Watford, for whom he made three FA Cup appearances. Upon the resumption of peacetime football, Jezzard spent his entire professional career as a striker at Fulham, during the 1940s and 1950s. He holds the club's post-war record for league goals scored in a season – 39 in 1953–54. His Fulham career lasted only from 1948 to 1957, due to an irreversible injury. During his time at Fulham, he was picked for the London XI in the Inter-Cities Fairs Cup.

He won two England caps in 1954–55 and three England B caps, scoring six goals making him the England B all-time top scorer.

Jezzard later managed Fulham from 1958 until 1964, taking them back into the First Division. He became discontented with the changes in football culture in the mid-1960s; essentially the abolition of the maximum wage, through the efforts of teammates Jimmy Hill and Johnny Haynes, which led to the concentration of power in the hands of the richer clubs. He retired to run a pub.

He died in May 2005 at the age of 77, and had been ill with multi-infarct dementia for some time.
