= 2003–04 West Ham United F.C. season =

English football team season

West Ham United
2003–04 season
- Chairman: Terry Brown
- Manager: Glenn Roeder (until 24 August); Sir Trevor Brooking (caretaker); Alan Pardew (from October)
- Stadium: Boleyn Ground
- First Division: 4th
- Play-offs: Runners-up (eliminated by Crystal Palace)
- FA Cup: Fifth round (eliminated by Fulham)
- League Cup: Third round (eliminated by Tottenham Hotspur)
- Top goalscorer: League: Marlon Harewood (13); All: Jermain Defoe (15)
- Average home league attendance: 31,325

The 2003–04 season saw West Ham United competing in the First Division for the first time since the 1992–93 season, having been relegated from the Premiership in 18th place the previous year.

== Season summary ==
Following West Ham's relegation from the Premiership, several key players left the club that summer, including Les Ferdinand, Trevor Sinclair, Frédéric Kanouté, Joe Cole, Paolo Di Canio and Glen Johnson. Young striker Jermain Defoe had also submitted a transfer request just one day after their relegation, but this was rejected and he would remain with the club for the start of the new season. Manager Glenn Roeder, who had since recovered from the brain tumour that caused him to miss the end of the previous season, immediately set about rebuilding his squad, signing Kevin Horlock, Matthew Etherington, Rob Lee and David Connolly prior to the beginning of the campaign. After a win over Preston North End on the opening day, a draw and a loss would follow and Roeder was sacked three games into the season. Sir Trevor Brooking once again took over as caretaker manager, and form improved as they won their next four games. A permanent replacement was soon found for Roeder, when Alan Pardew was bought in from Reading as new manager in October.

Despite continuing to be a prolific goalscorer for the club, disciplinary issues became a problem for striker Jermain Defoe, who was sent off three times and played just 22 out of a possible 34 games due to suspension in the first half of the season. This, combined with his repeated refusal to sign a new contract, meant West Ham allowed him to leave the club in January to sign with Tottenham Hotspur in a swap deal that saw West Ham take out of favour striker Bobby Zamora. Along with Defoe, goalkeeper David James and club mainstay Ian Pearce would also leave for Manchester City and Fulham F.C. respectively.

Under the guidance of Pardew, West Ham performed well enough to finish fourth and earn themselves a playoff finish. They would lose 1–0 to 5th place Ipswich Town in the first leg of their playoff semi-final, but bounced back to win 2–0 in the second, advancing to the final where they would face Crystal Palace at the Millennium Stadium. A goal from Neil Shipperley after 61 minutes would be enough to give Palace the win, consigning the Hammers to another season in English football's second tier.

== Final League table ==
Pos	Team	Pld	W	D	L	GF	GA	GD	Pts	Promotion, qualification or relegation
2	West Bromwich Albion (P)	46	25	11	10	64	42	+22	86	Promotion to the FA Premier League
3	Sunderland	46	22	13	11	62	45	+17	79	Qualification for the First Division play-offs
4	West Ham United	46	19	17	10	67	45	+22	74	Qualification for the First Division play-offs
5	Ipswich Town	46	21	10	15	84	72	+12	73	Qualification for the First Division play-offs
6	Crystal Palace (O, P)	46	21	10	15	72	61	+11	73	Qualification for the First Division play-offs

Source: Soccerway
Rules for classification: 1) points; 2) goal difference; 3) number of goals scored.
(O) Play-off winners; (P) Promoted

== First-team squad ==
Squad at end of season

Note: Flags indicate national team as defined under FIFA eligibility rules; some limited exceptions apply. Players may hold more than one non-FIFA nationality.

No.	Pos.	Nation	Player
2	DF	CZE	Tomáš Řepka
3	DF	ENG	Rufus Brevett
4	MF	SCO	Don Hutchison
5	MF	ENG	Rob Lee
6	MF	ENG	Michael Carrick
7	DF	SCO	Christian Dailly
8	FW	IRL	David Connolly
10	FW	ENG	Marlon Harewood
11	MF	NIR	Steve Lomas
12	MF	ENG	Matthew Etherington
14	DF	ENG	Wayne Quinn (on loan from Newcastle United)
15	DF	ENG	Anton Ferdinand
16	MF	NIR	Kevin Horlock
17	MF	ENG	Hayden Mullins

No.	Pos.	Nation	Player
18	FW	FRA	Youssef Sofiane
19	MF	ENG	Adam Nowland
20	MF	ENG	Nigel Reo-Coker
21	MF	AUS	Richard Garcia
22	DF	WAL	Andy Melville
24	DF	ENG	Jon Harley (on loan from Fulham)
25	FW	ENG	Bobby Zamora
26	MF	JAM	Jobi McAnuff
27	DF	ENG	Shaun Byrne
29	FW	ENG	Brian Deane
30	GK	CZE	Pavel Srníček
32	GK	ENG	Stephen Bywater
34	DF	ENG	Elliott Ward
35	DF	ENG	Chris Cohen

=== Left club during season ===
Note: Flags indicate national team as defined under FIFA eligibility rules; some limited exceptions apply. Players may hold more than one non-FIFA nationality.

No.	Pos.	Nation	Player
1	GK	ENG	David James (to Manchester City)
9	FW	ENG	Jermain Defoe (to Tottenham Hotspur)
19	DF	ENG	Ian Pearce (to Fulham)
20	MF	SWE	Niclas Alexandersson (on loan from Everton)
20	MF	SCO	Robbie Stockdale (on loan from Middlesbrough)

No.	Pos.	Nation	Player
22	DF	ENG	Matthew Kilgallon (on loan from Leeds United)
28	MF	ENG	David Noble (to Boston United)
30	DF	FRA	Sebastian Schemmel (to Portsmouth)
30	GK	SWE	Rami Shaaban (on loan from Arsenal)
33	FW	ENG	Neil Mellor (on loan from Liverpool)

== Results ==
=== First Division ===
Manager: Glenn Roeder

9 August 2003	Preston North End	1–2	West Ham United	Preston
	Lewis 2'	Report	Defoe 5'; Connolly 69'	Stadium: Deepdale; Attendance: 18,246; Referee: Paul Danson

16 August 2003	West Ham United	0–0	Sheffield United	London
		Report		Stadium: Boleyn Ground; Attendance: 28.972; Referee: Keith Hill

23 August 2003	Rotherham United	1–0	West Ham United	Rotherham
	Byfield 14'	Report		Stadium: Millmoor; Attendance: 8,739; Referee: Mike Pike

Caretaker Manager: Trevor Brooking

26 August 2003	West Ham United	1–0	Bradford City	London
	Defoe 32'	Report		Stadium: Boleyn Ground; Attendance: 30,370; Referee: Richard Beeby

30 August 2003	Ipswich Town	1–2	West Ham United	Ipswich
	Wright 65'	Report	Defoe 21'; Connolly 47'	Stadium: Portman Road; Attendance: 29,679; Referee: Andy Hall

13 September 2003	West Ham United	1–0	Reading	London
	Dailly 17'	Report		Stadium: Boleyn Ground; Attendance: 32,634; Referee: Dermot Gallagher

16 September 2003	Crewe Alexandra	0–3	West Ham United	Crewe
		Report	Connolly 16', 21'; Etherington 25'	Stadium: Gresty Road; Attendance: 9,575; Referee: Alan Butler

20 September 2003	Gillingham	2–0	West Ham United	Gillingham
	King 57'; Benjamin 82'	Report		Stadium: Priestfield Stadium; Attendance: 11,418; Referee: Paul Armstrong

28 September 2003	West Ham United	1–1	Millwall	London
	Connolly 25'	Report	Cahill 73'	Stadium: Boleyn Ground; Attendance: 31,626; Referee: Mark Halsey

1 October 2003	West Ham United	3–0	Crystal Palace	London
	Defoe 19'; Mellor 32', 56'	Report		Stadium: Boleyn Ground; Attendance: 31,861; Referee: Michael Jones

4 October 2003	Derby County	0–1	West Ham United	Derby
		Report	Hutchison 90'	Stadium: Pride Park; Attendance: 22,810; Referee: Mick Fletcher

15 October 2003	West Ham United	1–1	Norwich City	London
	Edworthy 6', og'	Report	Crouch 63'	Stadium: Boleyn Ground; Attendance: 31,308; Referee: Steve Tomlin

18 October 2003	West Ham United	2–2	Burnley	London
	Connolly 20'; Hutchison 86'	Report	Facey 38'; Moore 82'	Stadium: Boleyn Ground; Attendance: 31,474; Referee: Iain Williamson

Manager: Alan Pardew

22 October 2003	West Ham United	1–1	Nottingham Forest	London
	Defoe 56'	Report	Reid 5'	Stadium: Boleyn Ground; Attendance: 29,544; Referee: Tony Bates

25 October 2003	Cardiff City	0–0	West Ham United	Cardiff
		Report		Stadium: Ninian Park; Attendance: 19,202; Referee: Mike Ryan

1 November 2003	Coventry City	1–1	West Ham United	Coventry
	Barrett 38'	Report	Defoe 15'	Stadium: Highfield Road; Attendance: 19,126; Referee: Graham Salisbury

8 November 2003	West Ham United	3–4	West Bromwich Albion	London
	Defoe 1'; Deane 10', 18'	Report	Hulse 25', 40'; Deane 66', og' Hughes 77'	Stadium: Boleyn Ground; Attendance: 30,359; Referee: Mike Dean

22 November 2003	Watford	0–0	West Ham United	Watford
		Report		Stadium: Vicarage Road; Attendance: 20,950; Referee: Phil Prosser

25 November 2003	Wimbledon	1–1	West Ham United	Milton Keynes
	McAnuff 63'	Report	Deane 51'	Stadium: National Hockey Stadium; Attendance: 8,118; Referee: Barry Knight

29 November 2003	West Ham United	4–0	Wigan Athletic	London
	Horlock 4'; Jarrett 17', og' Harewood 55', 75'	Report		Stadium: Boleyn Ground; Attendance: 34,375; Referee: Frazer Stretton

6 December 2003	West Bromwich Albion	1–1	West Ham United	West Bromwich
	Mullins 80', og'	Report	Deane 68'	Stadium: The Hawthorns; Attendance: 26,194; Referee: Mark Clattenburg

9 December 2003	West Ham United	0–1	Stoke City	London
		Report	Richardson 33'	Stadium: Boleyn Ground; Attendance: 24,365; Referee: Brian Curson

13 December 2003	West Ham United	3–2	Sunderland	London
	Defoe 55', 61'; Pearce 80'	Report	McAteer 4'; Oster 30'	Stadium: Boleyn Ground; Attendance: 30,329; Referee: Phil Joslin

20 December 2003	Walsall	1–1	West Ham United	Walsall
	Leitao 69'	Report	Harewood 10'	Stadium: Bescot Stadium; Attendance: 9,272; Referee: Scott Mathieson

26 December 2003	West Ham United	1–2	Ipswich Town	London
	Defoe 49'	Report	Couñago 70', 79'	Stadium: Boleyn Ground; Attendance: 35,021; Referee: Barry Knight

28 December 2003	Nottingham Forest	0–2	West Ham United	Nottingham
		Report	Harewood 7'; Defoe 84'	Stadium: City Ground; Attendance: 27,491; Referee: Richard Beeby

10 January 2004	West Ham United	1–2	Preston North End	London
	Connolly 19'	Report	Fuller 64'; Healy 67'	Stadium: Boleyn Ground; Attendance: 28,777; Referee: Mark Warren

17 January 2004	Sheffield United	3–3	West Ham United	Sheffield
	Peschisolido 5'; Shaw 72'; Jagielka 90'	Report	Carrick 19'; Harley 22'; Harewood 37'	Stadium: Brammall Lane; Attendance: 22,787; Referee: Paul Durkin

31 January 2004	West Ham United	2–1	Rotherham United	London
	Deane 15'; Dailly 59'	Report	Repka 23', og'	Stadium: Boleyn Ground; Attendance: 34,483; Referee: Grant Hegley

7 February 2004	Bradford City	1–2	West Ham United	Bradford
	Atherton 35'	Report	Zamora 65'; Harewood 78'	Stadium: Valley Parade; Attendance: 13,078; Referee: Mark Halsey

21 February 2004	Norwich City	1–1	West Ham United	Norwich
	Huckerby 76'	Report	Harewood 61'	Stadium: Carrow Road; Attendance: 23,940; Referee: Ray Olivier

28 February 2004	West Ham United	1–0	Cardiff City	London
	Zamora 73'	Report		Stadium: Boleyn Ground; Attendance: 31,858; Referee: George Cain

2 March 2004	Burnley	1–1	West Ham United	Burnley
	Branch 31'	Summary	Connolly 36'	Stadium: Turf Moor; Attendance: 12,440; Referee: Phil Dowd

6 March 2004	West Ham United	0–0	Walsall	London
		Report		Stadium: Boleyn Ground; Attendance: 33,177; Referee: Graham Laws

9 March 2004	West Ham United	5–0	Wimbledon	London
	Etherington 37', 49', 70'; Zamora 39'; Reo-Coker 62'	Report		Stadium: Boleyn Ground; Attendance: 29,818; Referee: Eddie Evans

13 March 2004	Sunderland	2–0	West Ham United	Sunderland
	Kyle 61'; Whitley 76'	Report		Stadium: Stadium of Light; Attendance: 29,533; Referee: Richard Beeby

17 March 2004	West Ham United	4–2	Crewe Alexandra	London
	Harewood 6', 20'; Reo-Coker 35'; McAnuff 41'	Report	S. Jones 61', 72'	Stadium: Boleyn Ground; Attendance: 31,158; Referee: David Crick

21 March 2004	Millwall	4–1	West Ham United	London
	Dailly 34', og' Cahill 46', 56'; Chadwick 80'	Report	Harewood 49'	Stadium: The Den; Attendance: 14,055; Referee: Jeff Winter

27 March 2004	West Ham United	2–1	Gillingham	London
	Zamora 3'; Etherington 76'	Report	Spiller 32'	Stadium: Boleyn Ground; Attendance: 34,551; Referee: Andy Penn

3 April 2004	Reading	2–0	West Ham United	Reading
	Kitson 35', 52'	Report		Stadium: Madejski Stadium; Attendance: 21,718; Referee: Phil Joslin

10 April 2004	West Ham United	0–0	Derby County	London
		Report		Stadium: Boleyn Ground; Attendance: 28,207; Referee: Paul Robinson

12 April 2004	Crystal Palace	1–0	West Ham United	London
	Freedman 66'	Report		Stadium: Selhurst Park; Attendance: 23,977; Referee: Tony Bates

17 April 2004	West Ham United	2–0	Coventry City	London
	Zamora 37'; Connolly 71'	Report		Stadium: Boleyn Ground; Attendance: 27,890; Referee: Howard Webb

24 April 2004	Stoke City	0–2	West Ham United	Stoke-on-Trent
		Report	Connolly 39'; Harewood 59'	Stadium: Britannia Stadium; Attendance: 18,227; Referee: Neale Barry

1 May 2004	West Ham United	4–0	Watford	London
	Hutchison 17'; Dailly 44'; Harewood 63', 90'	Report		Stadium: Boleyn Ground; Attendance: 34,685; Referee: Michael Jones

9 May 2004	Wigan Athletic	1–1	West Ham United	Wigan
	N. Roberts 34'	Report	Deane 90'	Stadium: JJB Stadium; Attendance: 20,669; Referee: Roy Pearson

=== First Division play-offs ===
15 May 2004	Ipswich Town	1–0	West Ham United	Ipswich
	Bent 57'	Report		Stadium: Portman Road; Attendance: 28,435; Referee: Mark Clattenburg

18 May 2004	West Ham United	2–0 (2–1 agg.)	Ipswich Town	London
	Etherington 50'; Dailly 71'	Report		Stadium: Boleyn Ground; Attendance: 34,002; Referee: Neale Barry

29 May 2004	West Ham United	0–1	Crystal Palace	Cardiff
		Report	Shipperley 61'	Stadium: Millennium Stadium; Attendance: 72,523; Referee: Graham Poll

=== League Cup ===
13 August 2003 First Round	West Ham United	3–1	Rushden & Diamonds	London
	Defoe 9'; Connolly 14', 78'	Report	Lowe 34'	Stadium: Boleyn Ground; Attendance: 13,715; Referee: Mark Cowburn

23 September 2003 Second Round	Cardiff City	2–3	West Ham United	Cardiff
	Earnshaw 12', 25'	Report	Defoe 45', 64', 88'	Stadium: Ninian Park; Attendance: 10,724; Referee: Andy D'Urso

29 October 2003 Third Round	Tottenham Hotspur	1–0 (a.e.t.)	West Ham United	London
	Zamora 91'	Report		Stadium: White Hart Lane; Attendance: 36,053; Referee: Graham Barber

=== FA Cup ===
3 January 2004 Third Round	Wigan Athletic	1–2	West Ham United	Wigan
	Quinn 90', og'	Report	Mullins 80'; Connolly 85'	Stadium: JJB Stadium; Attendance: 11,793; Referee: Howard Webb

25 January 2004 Fourth Round	Wolverhampton Wanderers	1–3	West Ham United	Wolverhampton
	Ganea 23'	Report	Deane 4'; Harewood 21'; Connolly 32'	Stadium: Molineux; Attendance: 24,143; Referee: Mark Halsey

14 February 2004 Fifth Round	Fulham	0–0	West Ham United	London
		Report		Stadium: Loftus Road; Attendance: 14,705; Referee: Graham Poll

24 February 2004 Fifth Round Replay	West Ham United	0–3	Fulham	London
		Report	McBride 76'; Hayles 79'; Boa Morte 90'	Stadium: Boleyn Ground; Attendance: 27,934; Referee: Mike Riley

== Statistics ==
=== Overview ===
Competition	Record							
Competition	P	W	D	L	GF	GA	GD	Win %
First Division	46	19	17	10	67	45	+22	41.30
Play-offs	3	1	0	2	2	2	+0	33.33
FA Cup	4	2	1	1	5	5	+0	50.00
League Cup	3	2	0	1	6	4	+2	66.67
Total	56	24	18	14	80	56	+24	42.86

=== Goalscorers ===
Rank	Pos	No.	Nat	Name	First Division	Play-offs	FA Cup	League Cup	Total
1	ST	9	(England)	Jermain Defoe	11	0	0	4	15
2	ST	8	(Republic of Ireland)	David Connolly	10	0	2	2	14
2	ST	10	(England)	Marlon Harewood	13	1	0	0	14
4	ST	29	(England)	Brian Deane	6	0	1	0	7
5	MF	12	(England)	Matthew Etherington	5	1	0	0	6
6	ST	25	(England)	Bobby Zamora	5	0	0	0	5
7	DF	7	(Scotland)	Christian Dailly	3	1	0	0	4
8	MF	4	(Scotland)	Don Hutchison	3	0	0	0	3
9	MF	20	(England)	Nigel Reo-Coker	2	0	0	0	2
9	ST	33	(England)	Neil Mellor	2	0	0	0	2
9	Own goals				2	0	0	0	2
12	MF	6	(England)	Michael Carrick	1	0	0	0	1
12	MF	16	(Northern Ireland)	Kevin Horlock	1	0	0	0	1
12	MF	17	(England)	Hayden Mullins	0	0	1	0	1
12	DF	19	(England)	Ian Pearce	1	0	0	0	1
12	DF	24	(England)	Jon Harley	1	0	0	0	1
12	MF	26	(Jamaica)	Jobi McAnuff	1	0	0	0	1
Totals					67	2	5	6	80

=== League position by matchday ===
Round	1	2	3	4	5	6	7	8	9	10	11	12	13	14	15	16	17	18	19	20	21	22	23	24	25	26	27	28	29	30	31	32	33	34	35	36	37	38	39	40	41	42	43	44	45	46
Ground	A	H	A	H	A	H	A	A	H	H	A	H	H	H	A	A	H	A	A	H	A	H	H	A	H	A	H	A	H	A	A	H	A	H	H	A	H	A	H	A	H	A	H	A	H	A
Result	W	D	L	W	W	W	W	L	D	W	W	D	D	D	D	D	L	D	D	W	D	L	W	D	L	W	L	D	W	W	D	W	D	D	W	L	W	L	W	L	D	L	W	W	W	D
Position	7	8	12	10	6	3	2	4	5	4	3	4	5	5	6	6	6	9	9	7	8	9	6	6	8	7	8	8	7	5	5	6	5	5	3	5	3	5	4	4	6	8	6	5	3	4

A = Away; H = Home; W = Win; D = Draw; L = Loss

=== Appearances and goals ===
No.	Pos	Nat	Player	Total		First Division		Play-offs		FA Cup		League Cup	
No.	Pos	Nat	Player	Apps	Goals	Apps	Goals	Apps	Goals	Apps	Goals	Apps	Goals
Goalkeepers
1	GK	(England) ENG	David James	31	0	27	0	0	0	1	0	3	0
30	GK	(Czech Republic) CZE	Pavel Srnicek	3	0	2+1	0	0	0	0	0	0	0
32	GK	(England) ENG	Stephen Bywater	23	0	17	0	3	0	3	0	0	0
Defenders
2	DF	(Czech Republic) CZE	Tomáš Řepka	47	0	40	0	3	0	2	0	2	0
3	DF	(England) ENG	Rufus Brevett	3	0	2	0	0	0	0	0	1	0
7	DF	(Scotland) SCO	Christian Dailly	53	3	43	2	3	1	3+1	0	3	0
14	DF	(England) ENG	Wayne Quinn	27	0	22	0	0	0	2+1	0	2	0
15	DF	(England) ENG	Anton Ferdinand	26	0	9+11	0	0	0	3	0	2+1	0
19	DF	(England) ENG	Ian Pearce	26	1	24	1	0	0	1	0	1	0
20	DF	(Scotland) SCO	Robbie Stockdale	9	0	5+2	0	0	0	1	0	1	0
22	DF	(England) ENG	Matthew Kilgallon	4	0	1+2	0	0	0	0	0	1	0
22	DF	(Wales) WAL	Andy Melville	17	0	11+3	0	3	0	0	0	0	0
24	DF	(England) ENG	Jon Harley	16	1	15	1	0	0	1	0	0	0
27	DF	(England) ENG	Shaun Byrne	1	0	0	0	0	0	0	0	0+1	0
35	DF	(England) ENG	Chris Cohen	7	0	1+6	0	0	0	0	0	0	0
Midfielders
4	MF	(Scotland) SCO	Don Hutchison	27	4	10+14	4	0+1	0	0+1	0	1	0
5	MF	(England) ENG	Rob Lee	19	0	12+4	0	0	0	0+1	0	2	0
6	MF	(England) ENG	Michael Carrick	43	1	34+1	1	3	0	4	0	1	0
11	MF	(Northern Ireland) NIR	Steve Lomas	10	0	5	0	3	0	0+2	0	0	0
12	MF	(England) ENG	Matthew Etherington	45	6	34+1	5	3	1	4	0	3	0
16	MF	(Northern Ireland) NIR	Kevin Horlock	33	1	23+4	1	0	0	4	0	2	0
17	MF	(England) ENG	Hayden Mullins	34	1	27	0	3	0	4	1	0	0
19	MF	(England) ENG	Adam Nowland	11	0	2+9	0	0	0	0	0	0	0
20	MF	(Sweden) SWE	Niclas Alexandersson	8	0	5+3	0	0	0	0	0	0	0
20	MF	(England) ENG	Nigel Reo-Coker	18	2	13+2	2	0+3	0	0	0	0	0
23	MF	(France) FRA	Sebastien Carole	1	0	0+1	0	0	0	0	0	0	0
26	MF	(Jamaica) JAM	Jobi McAnuff	13	1	4+8	1	0+1	0	0	0	0	0
28	MF	(England) ENG	David Noble	4	0	0+3	0	0	0	0	0	1	0
Forwards
8	FW	(Republic of Ireland) IRL	David Connolly	48	14	37+2	10	3	0	4	2	2	2
9	FW	(England) ENG	Jermain Defoe	22	15	19	11	0	0	0	0	3	4
10	FW	(England) ENG	Marlon Harewood	35	14	28	13	3	0	4	1	0	0
18	FW	(France) FRA	Youssef Sofiane	2	0	0+1	0	0	0	0	0	1	0
21	FW	(Australia) AUS	Richard Garcia	10	0	2+5	0	0	0	0	0	0+3	0
25	FW	(England) ENG	Bobby Zamora	20	5	15+2	5	3	0	0	0	0	0
29	FW	(England) ENG	Brian Deane	32	7	9+17	6	0+3	0	3	1	0	0
33	FW	(England) ENG	Neil Mellor	21	2	8+8	2	0	0	0+3	0	1+1	0
