= 2003–04 Crystal Palace F.C. season =

English football club season

Crystal Palace
2003–04 season
- Chairman: Simon Jordan
- Manager: Steve Kember; Kit Symons (caretaker); Iain Dowie
- Stadium: Selhurst Park
- First Division: 6th (qualified for play-offs)
- Play-offs: Winners
- FA Cup: Third round
- League Cup: Fourth round
- Top goalscorer: League: Andy Johnson (28); All: Andy Johnson (32)
- Average home league attendance: 19,968
Home colours	Away colours

During the 2003–04 English football season, Crystal Palace competed in the Football League First Division.

== Season summary ==
Crystal Palace started the season on the right foot, winning their first three games to top the table, but that was as good as it got under manager Steve Kember and, after a 5–0 defeat at newly promoted Wigan Athletic in November saw the club in 20th place, Kember was sacked (chairman Simon Jordan had previously declared that Kember would have a "job for life" at Palace). Kit Symons stepped up as caretaker until Northern Irishman and former Palace striker Iain Dowie was appointed. Under Dowie, Palace rocketed up the table to reach the play-offs. After beating Sunderland on penalties in the semi-final to reach the Millennium Stadium, they beat West Ham United to regain promotion to the Premiership.

Crucial to Palace's promotion was striker Andy Johnson, who scored 28 times in the league alone. He finished as the First Division's top scorer, and was voted as the club's Player of the Year.

== Kit ==
English company Admiral Sportswear became Palace's kit manufacturers. The new home kit retained the navy shorts worn last season, albeit with a new blue and red striped design along the sides, and the navy socks, which now featured white trim. Palace's traditional blue and red striped shirts were modified with navy trim on the sleeves.

Churchill Insurance remained the kit sponsors for the fourth consecutive season.

== Final league table ==
Pos	Team	Pld	W	D	L	GF	GA	GD	Pts	Promotion, qualification or relegation
4	West Ham United	46	19	17	10	67	45	+22	74	Qualification for the First Division play-offs
5	Ipswich Town	46	21	10	15	84	72	+12	73	Qualification for the First Division play-offs
6	Crystal Palace (O, P)	46	21	10	15	72	61	+11	73	Qualification for the First Division play-offs
7	Wigan Athletic	46	18	17	11	60	45	+15	71	
8	Sheffield United	46	20	11	15	65	56	+9	71	

Source: Soccerway
Rules for classification: 1) points; 2) goal difference; 3) number of goals scored.
(O) Play-off winners; (P) Promoted

== Results ==
Crystal Palace's score comes first

=== Legend ===
Win	Draw	Loss

=== Football League First Division ===
Date	Opponent	Venue	Result	Attendance	Scorers
9 August 2003	Burnley	A	3–2	12,976	Freedman (3, 1 pen)
16 August 2003	Watford	H	1–0	15,333	Shipperley
23 August 2003	Wimbledon	A	3–1	6,113	Butterfield, Freedman (pen), Hughes
26 August 2003	Sheffield United	H	1–2	15,466	Johnson
30 August 2003	Millwall	A	1–1	14,425	Watson
13 September 2003	Sunderland	A	1–2	27,324	Johnson
16 September 2003	Bradford City	H	0–1	13,514	
20 September 2003	West Bromwich Albion	H	2–2	17,477	Freedman, Johnson
27 September 2003	Norwich City	A	1–2	16,425	Derry
1 October 2003	West Ham United	A	0–3	31,861	
4 October 2003	Cardiff City	H	2–1	16,160	Routledge, Shipperley
14 October 2003	Derby County	H	1–1	14,344	Butterfield
18 October 2003	Rotherham United	H	1–1	18,715	Freedman
21 October 2003	Ipswich Town	H	3–4	15,483	Johnson, Freedman (2, 1 pen)
25 October 2003	Gillingham	A	0–1	8,889	
1 November 2003	Wigan Athletic	A	0–5	6,796	
8 November 2003	Preston North End	H	1–1	14,608	Johnson
22 November 2003	Walsall	A	0–0	6,910	
25 November 2003	Stoke City	A	1–0	10,277	Johnson
29 November 2003	Coventry City	H	1–1	14,622	Edwards
6 December 2003	Preston North End	A	1–4	12,836	Derry
9 December 2003	Crewe Alexandra	H	1–3	12,259	Butterfield
13 December 2003	Nottingham Forest	H	1–0	16,935	Johnson
20 December 2003	Reading	A	3–0	12,743	Johnson (2), Routledge
26 December 2003	Millwall	H	0–1	19,737	
28 December 2003	Ipswich Town	A	3–1	27,629	Johnson, Gray
10 January 2004	Burnley	H	0–0	15,276	
17 January 2004	Watford	A	5–1	15,017	Johnson (2, 1 pen), Routledge, Gray, Freedman
24 January 2004	Bradford City	A	2–1	10,310	Johnson, Shipperley
31 January 2004	Wimbledon	H	3–1	20,552	Johnson (2), Granville
7 February 2004	Sheffield United	A	3–0	23,816	Johnson, Popovic, Shipperley
14 February 2004	Stoke City	H	6–3	16,715	Johnson (3, 2 pens), Hughes, Shipperley, Routledge
21 February 2004	Derby County	A	1–2	21,856	Hughes
28 February 2004	Gillingham	H	1–0	17,485	Butterfield
6 March 2004	Reading	H	2–2	17,853	Freedman, Johnson
13 March 2004	Nottingham Forest	A	2–3	28,306	Shipperley, Granville
20 March 2004	Norwich City	H	1–0	23,798	Routledge
27 March 2004	West Bromwich Albion	A	0–2	24,990	
6 April 2004	Rotherham United	A	2–1	6,001	Gray, Shipperley
10 April 2004	Cardiff City	A	2–0	16,656	Johnson, Routledge
12 April 2004	West Ham United	H	1–0	23,977	Freedman
17 April 2004	Wigan Athletic	H	1–1	18,799	Granville
21 April 2004	Sunderland	H	3–0	18,291	Johnson (pen), Shipperley, Freedman
24 April 2004	Crewe Alexandra	A	3–2	8,136	Johnson (3, 1 pen)
1 May 2004	Walsall	H	1–0	21,518	Johnson
9 May 2004	Coventry City	A	1–2	22,195	Freedman

=== First Division play-offs ===
Round	Date	Opponent	Venue	Result	Attendance	Goalscorers
SF 1st Leg	14 May 2004	Sunderland	H	3–2	25,287	Shipperley, Butterfield, Johnson
SF 2nd Leg	17 May 2004	Sunderland	A	1–2 (won 5–4 on pens)	34,536	Powell
F	29 May 2004	West Ham United	N	1–0	72,523	Shipperley

=== FA Cup ===
Round	Date	Opponent	Venue	Result	Attendance	Goalscorers
R3	3 January 2004	Tottenham Hotspur	A	0–3	32,340	

=== League Cup ===
Round	Date	Opponent	Venue	Result	Attendance	Goalscorers
R1	12 August 2003	Torquay United	A	1–1 (won 3–1 on pens)	3,366	Freedman
R2	23 September 2003	Doncaster Rovers	H	2–1	4,904	Johnson (2 pens)
R3	28 October 2003	Blackpool	A	3–1	6,010	Johnson (2), Freedman
R4	3 December 2003	Aston Villa	A	0–3	24,258	

== Players ==
=== First-team squad ===
Note: Flags indicate national team as defined under FIFA eligibility rules; some limited exceptions apply. Players may hold more than one non-FIFA nationality.

No.	Pos.	Nation	Player
2	DF	IRL	Curtis Fleming (Note: Fleming was born in Manchester, England.)
3	DF	ENG	Danny Granville
4	DF	ENG	Danny Butterfield
5	DF	WAL	Kit Symons (Note: Symons was born in Basingstoke, England, but also qualified to represent Wales internationally through his father and made his international debut for Wales in February 1992.)
6	DF	AUS	Tony Popovic
8	FW	ENG	Andy Johnson
9	FW	SCO	Dougie Freedman
10	MF	ENG	Shaun Derry
11	FW	ENG	Neil Shipperley
12	DF	ENG	Jamie Smith
13	GK	FRA	Cédric Berthelin
14	MF	ENG	Ben Watson
15	MF	FIN	Aki Riihilahti
16	MF	ENG	Tommy Black

No.	Pos.	Nation	Player
17	MF	NIR	Michael Hughes
18	DF	ENG	Gary Borrowdale
20	DF	ENG	Mark Hudson (on loan from Fulham)
21	MF	ENG	Julian Gray
22	MF	ENG	Wayne Routledge
23	FW	WAL	Gareth Williams (Note: Williams was born in Johannesburg, South Africa, but also qualified to represent Wales internationally and represented them at U-21 level.)
24	MF	ENG	Mikele Leigertwood (Note: Leigertwood was born in Enfield, England, but qualified to represent Antigua and Barbuda internationally and would make his international debut for Antigua and Barbuda in November 2008.)
26	MF	ENG	Ben Surey
27	GK	BEL	Nico Vaesen (on loan from Birmingham City)
28	MF	ENG	Tom Soares
29	MF	MRI	Gavin Heeroo (Note: Heeroo was born in Haringey, England, but qualified to represent Mauritius internationally and made his international debut for Mauritius in 2002.)
30	GK	ENG	Lance Cronin
32	MF	ENG	Darren Powell
36	DF	ENG	Tariq Nabil

=== Left club during season ===
Note: Flags indicate national team as defined under FIFA eligibility rules; some limited exceptions apply. Players may hold more than one non-FIFA nationality.

No.	Pos.	Nation	Player
1	GK	ENG	Matt Clarke (retired)
7	MF	ENG	Hayden Mullins (to West Ham United)
19	DF	WAL	Rob Edwards (Note: Edwards was born in Madeley, England, but qualified to represent Wales internationally and made his international debut for Wales in March 2003.) (on loan from Aston Villa)

No.	Pos.	Nation	Player
25	GK	NOR	Thomas Myhre (on loan from Sunderland)
31	FW	NGA	Ade Akinbiyi (Note: Akinbiyi was born in Hackney, England, but also qualified to represent Nigeria internationally through his parents and made his international debut for Nigeria in 1999.) (to Stoke City)
