= 2004 Football League First Division play-off final =

Association football match in Cardiff, UK

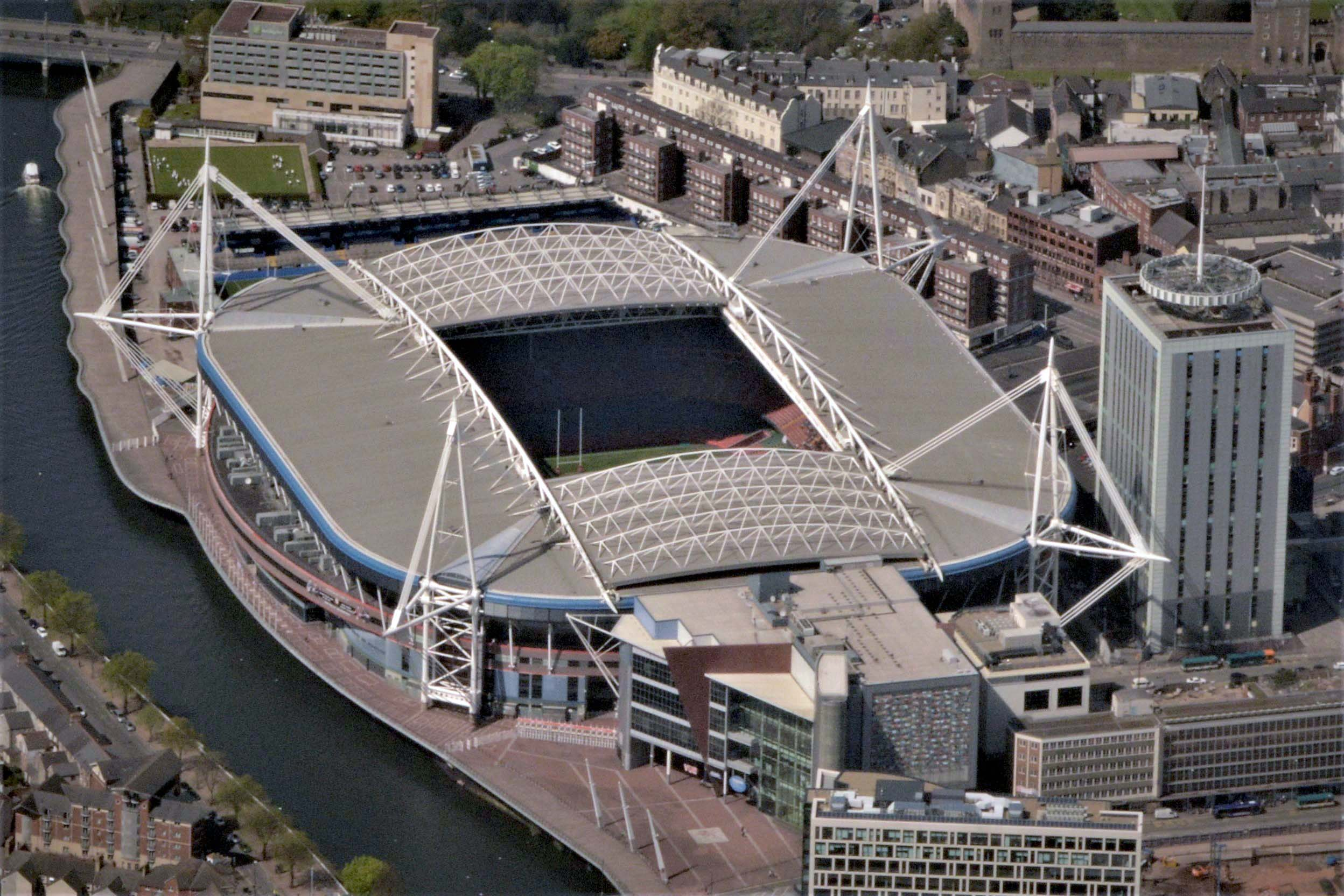
- The match was played at the Millennium Stadium in Cardiff.
Crystal Palace	West Ham United
1	0
- Date: 29 May 2004
- Venue: Millennium Stadium, Cardiff
- Referee: Graham Poll (Herts)
- Attendance: 72,523

The 2004 Football League First Division play-off final was an association football match which was played on 29 May 2004 at the Millennium Stadium, Cardiff, between Crystal Palace and West Ham United. The match was to determine the third and final team to gain promotion from the Football League First Division, the second tier of English football, to the FA Premier League. The top two teams of the 2003–04 Football League First Division season gained automatic promotion to the Premier League, while the clubs placed from third to sixth place in the table took part in play-off semi-finals; West Ham ended the season in fourth position while Crystal Palace finished sixth. The winners of these semi-finals competed for the final place for the 2004–05 season in the Premier League. Ipswich Town and Sunderland were the losing semi-finalists. Winning the final was estimated to be worth up to £30 million to the successful team.

The 2005 final was played in front of a crowd of 72,523 and was refereed by Graham Poll. After a goalless first half, Crystal Palace took the lead with a goal from Neil Shipperley in the 62nd minute. West Ham twice had goals ruled out for offside and were denied a penalty late in the second half, and Palace held on to win 1–0.

West Ham finished the following season in sixth place in the Championship and gained promotion through the play-offs, beating Preston North End in the final. Palace were relegated on the final day of the following season finishing in 18th place in the table, making an immediate return to the second tier.

== Route to the final ==
Football League Championship final table, leading positions
Pos	Team	Pld	W	D	L	GF	GA	GD	Pts
1	Norwich City	46	28	10	8	79	39	+40	94
2	West Bromwich Albion	46	25	11	10	64	42	+22	86
3	Sunderland	46	22	13	11	62	45	+17	79
4	West Ham United	46	19	17	10	67	45	+22	74
5	Ipswich Town	46	21	10	15	84	72	+12	73
6	Crystal Palace	46	21	10	15	72	61	+11	73

West Ham United finished the regular 2003–04 season in fifth place in the Football League First Division, the second tier of the English football league system, two places and one point ahead of Crystal Palace. Both therefore missed out on the two automatic places for promotion to the Premier League and instead took part in the play-offs, along with Sunderland and Ipswich Town, to determine the third promoted team. West Ham finished twelve points behind West Bromwich Albion (who were promoted in second place) and twenty behind league winners Norwich City.

Crystal Palace manager Iain Dowie had been appointed in December 2003 with the club in 19th position, before losing just six times in the final half of the season to finish sixth, a turnaround in form described by the BBC as "a remarkable transformation". Their qualification for the play-offs was secured in injury time of the final game of the season when West Ham's Brian Deane equalised against Wigan Athletic. Palace faced Sunderland in their play-off semi-final with the first leg being played at Selhurst Park on 14 May 2004. After a goalless first half, Sunderland took the lead early in the second through a Marcus Stewart penalty. Within a minute, Neil Shipperley equalised with a header before Danny Butterfield's deflected shot gave Palace the lead ten minutes later. Kevin Kyle levelled the tie with five minutes to go before Andrew Johnson restored Palace's lead two minutes later, with the match ending 3–2. The second leg took place at the Stadium of Light in Sunderland three days later. Although Palace's Aki Riihilahti hit the woodwork in the sixth minute, Kyle scored in the 42nd minute to level the tie on aggregate. Stewart scored with a header just before half-time to make it 4–3 to Sunderland before substitute Darren Powell's header made it 4–4 on aggregate and sent the semi-final to penalties. John Oster and Jason McAteer both missed penalties for Sunderland while Mart Poom saved twice, from Shaun Derry and Wayne Routledge. Jeff Whitley then failed to score and Michael Hughes struck the winning spot-kick.

West Ham's play-off semi-final opponents were Ipswich Town, and the first leg took place at Portman Road in Ipswich on 15 May 2004. Ian Westlake's shot was cleared off the line by West Ham's Andy Melville in the first half, which ended goalless. Twelve minutes into the second half, Darren Bent scored with a header after Richard Naylor's initial shot rebounded off the crossbar, and the game ended 1–0. The return leg was played at the Boleyn Ground three days later. Bent missed an early chance to extend Ipswich's lead and Steve Lomas hit the post for West Ham, the first half ending goalless. In the 50th minute, Matthew Etherington scored from inside the Ipswich penalty area with a strike described by the BBC as a "screamer" to level the tie. Twenty minutes later, an Etherington corner was poorly defended by Ipswich, and Christian Dailly's shot was deflected into the Ipswich goal off Tommy Miller's heel. Westlake hit the post in the last minute but West Ham held on to win the semi-final 2–1 on aggregate to qualify for the final.

== Match ==
=== Background ===
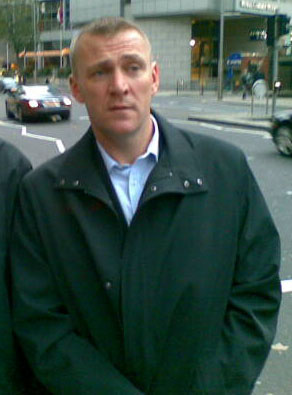
Graham Poll was the match referee.

This was Crystal Palace's fourth appearance in the second tier play-off final, with their most recent being in the 1997 final at the old Wembley Stadium which they won 1–0 against Sheffield United. Palace had also won the 1989 final (over two legs) against Blackburn Rovers and had lost the 1996 final in extra time against Leicester City. West Ham were making their first appearance in a second-tier playoff final. Crystal Palace's Johnson was the league's leading scorer with 27 goals in the regular season, while his teammate Dougie Freedman was the club's second highest scorer with 13. West Ham's top scorer was Marlon Harewood who had struck 25 goals during the regular league season, although 12 of them were for his previous club, Nottingham Forest, from whom he moved in November 2004.

During the regular league season, both sides won at home in the matches between them: in October 2003, West Ham won 3–0 at Boleyn Park while six months later, Palace triumphed 1–0 at Selhurst Park. The referee for the match was Graham Poll representing the Hertfordshire County Football Association. Winning the final was estimated to be worth up to £30 million to the successful team. It was the fourth time the second tier play-off final was hosted by the Millennium Stadium in Cardiff.

=== Summary ===
The match kicked off around 3 p.m. in front of a Millennium Stadium crowd of 72,523 spectators. Early in the first half, Dailly fouled Riihilahti and from the resulting Palace free kick, Butterfield's shot was just wide of the West Ham goalpost. On 17 minutes, Johnson's free header from a Routledge cross went over the crossbar despite Shipperley being in a better position. Palace defender Danny Granville subsequently missed a chance after West Ham's goalkeeper Stephen Bywater fumbled a Shaun Derry corner. In the 20th minute, Michael Carrick's chipped through-ball sent Bobby Zamora free but his shot was straight into Nico Vaesen's legs. Approaching half time, Routledge played in a cross and Hughes' initial strike was blocked. His second attempt from the rebound beat Bywater but was cleared off the line by Tomáš Řepka. Zamora then saw a penalty appeal denied after he felt he was fouled by Mikele Leigertwood on the edge of the Palace box. The first half ended goalless.

Early in the second half, West Ham increased the pressure with Vaesen saving a 25 yards (23 m) Lomas shot, and Melville's appeal for a penalty was turned down mafter his shot was blocked. The deadlock was broken in the 62nd minute as Shipperley scored for Palace. Johnson twisted and struck a shot through Dailly's legs which Bywater failed to hold, allowing Shipperley to tap the ball in from close range. David Connolly and subsequently Zamora then saw goals disallowed for offside. Carrick's shot from distance was then saved by Vaesen. In the 68th minute, West Ham made a double substitution with Deane and Nigel Reo-Coker coming on to replace Zamora and Harewood. A minute later Palace brought on Powell for Butterfield before West Ham made their third and final substitution, with Don Hutchison replacing Connolly. In the 83rd minute, Leigertwood appeared to bring down Carrick in front of Poll, but no penalty was awarded. Palace held on to win 1–0 and secure promotion to the Premier League.

=== Details ===
29 May 2004
15:00 BST

Crystal Palace	1–0	West Ham United
Shipperley 61'	Report

Millennium Stadium, Cardiff
Attendance: 72,523
Referee: Graham Poll (Hertfordshire)

GK	27	(Belgium) Nico Vaesen
RB	4	(England) Danny Butterfield		(substituted off) 69'
CB	6	(Australia) Tony Popović
CB	24	(England) Mikele Leigertwood
LB	3	(England) Danny Granville
RM	22	(England) Wayne Routledge	Booked
CM	15	(Finland) Aki Riihilahti
CM	10	(England) Shaun Derry	Booked
LM	17	(Northern Ireland) Michael Hughes	Booked
CF	11	(England) Neil Shipperley (captain)
CF	8	(England) Andrew Johnson
Substitutes:
GK	13	(France) Cédric Berthelin
DF	32	(England) Darren Powell		(substituted on) 69'
MF	14	(England) Ben Watson
MF	16	(England) Tommy Black
FW	9	(Scotland) Dougie Freedman
Manager:
(Northern Ireland) Iain Dowie

GK	32	(England) Stephen Bywater
RB	2	(Czech Republic) Tomáš Řepka	Booked
CB	7	(Scotland) Christian Dailly (captain)
CB	22	(Wales) Andy Melville
LB	17	(England) Hayden Mullins	Booked
RM	10	(England) Marlon Harewood		(substituted off) 68'
CM	6	(England) Michael Carrick
CM	11	(Northern Ireland) Steve Lomas
LM	12	(England) Matthew Etherington	Booked
CF	25	(England) Bobby Zamora		(substituted off) 68'
CF	8	(Republic of Ireland) David Connolly		(substituted off) 74'
Substitutes:
GK	30	(Czech Republic) Pavel Srníček
DF	3	(England) Rufus Brevett
MF	4	(Scotland) Don Hutchison		(substituted on) 74'
MF	20	(England) Nigel Reo-Coker	Booked	(substituted on) 68'
FW	29	(England) Brian Deane		(substituted on) 68'
Manager:
(England) Alan Pardew

Statistics
Statistic	Crystal Palace	West Ham United
Total shots	12	10
Shots on target	8	4
Ball possession	50%	50%
Corner kicks	4	9
Fouls committed	17	10
Offsides	2	6
Yellow cards	3	4
Red cards	0	0

== Post-match ==
Winning manager Dowie was quick to praise his team: "The players have shown great commitment and desire. We showed today that we are a good football side and now we have to take on the superpowers". He was realistic about the forthcoming season, noting "we have got to come up with a format for keeping us in the Premier League; it is a huge ask". His counterpart Alan Pardew described it as a "dark day" for West Ham, suggesting: "all our fans, their dreams and ambitions for the club, have been ended and it hits your right between the eyes".

West Ham finished the following season in sixth place in the Championship and gained promotion through the play-offs, beating Preston North End 1–0 in the final. Palace were relegated on the final day of the following season after a 2–2 draw with Charlton Athletic consigned them to 18th place in the table and assured their immediate return to the second tier.
