= Andrew Johnson (footballer, born 1981) =

English footballer (born 1981)

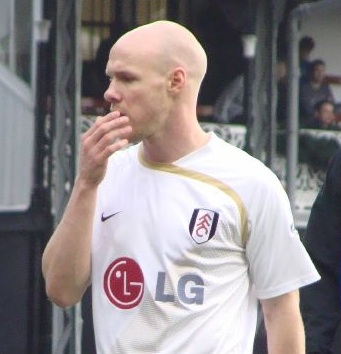
- Johnson in 2008

Personal information
- Full name: Andrew Johnson
- Date of birth: 10 February 1981 (age 45)
- Place of birth: Bedford, England
- Height: 5 ft 7 in (1.70 m)
- Position: Striker

Youth career
- Luton Town
- –1998: Birmingham City

Senior career*
Years	Team	Apps	(Gls)
1998–2002	Birmingham City	83	(8)
2002–2006	Crystal Palace	140	(74)
2006–2008	Everton	61	(17)
2008–2012	Fulham	86	(13)
2012–2014	Queens Park Rangers	20	(2)
2014–2015	Crystal Palace	0	(0)
Total		390	(114)

International career
2005–2007	England	8	(0)
- * Club domestic league appearances and goals

Andrew Johnson (born 10 February 1981) is an English former professional footballer who played as a striker. He played for Birmingham City, Crystal Palace, Everton, Fulham and Queens Park Rangers.

A legend at Crystal Palace, Johnson scored more than one goal per every other game in 140 appearances and helped Crystal Palace win promotion to the Premier League

He was capped eight times for England.

== Club career ==
=== Birmingham City ===
Johnson was born in Bedford, Bedfordshire, and started his career at Luton Town's Academy. He moved on to Birmingham City, where he signed his first professional contract on 11 March 1998. He missed a deciding penalty in the 2001 League Cup Final penalty shoot-out defeat to Liverpool.

After making over 100 appearances for the Blues, he was sold to Crystal Palace in 2002, following Birmingham's promotion into the Premier League. Johnson was used as the makeweight in a transfer deal for Clinton Morrison, valued at £750,000 for the purposes of the transaction.

=== Crystal Palace ===
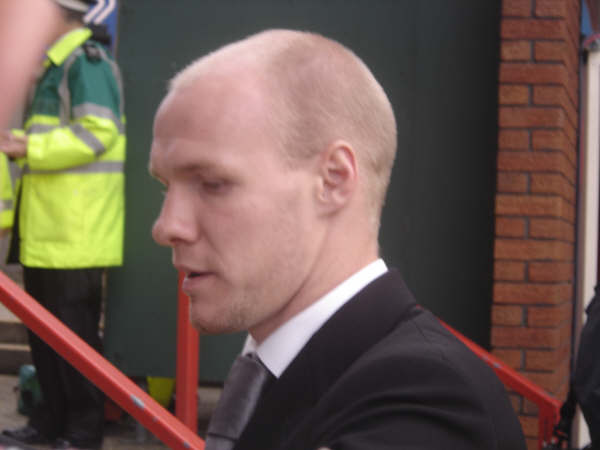
Johnson in 2005

Johnson scored his first goal for Crystal Palace on 10 September 2002; the extra time winner in a League Cup tie against Plymouth Argyle. Johnson continued to make a strong start to his career at Palace by scoring a hat-trick in the 5–0 thrashing of rivals Brighton & Hove Albion on 26 October 2002, and then another, in the next match, at Walsall. Despite this, he made few appearances until manager Trevor Francis was dismissed with the Eagles mid-table, and replaced by Steve Kember. Kember was replaced by Iain Dowie a few months into the 2003–04 season. Under the new manager, Johnson ended the season as top scorer in the 2003–04 First Division season with 32 goals. Palace reached the play-offs and were promoted into the Premier League for 2004–05 after beating West Ham United 1–0 in the final.

Despite Palace's relegation back into the Championship the following season, Johnson was the highest scoring English player with 21 goals and the second highest overall in the Premier League. his form attracted the attention of England manager Sven-Göran Eriksson. Johnson requested a transfer, but signed a new five-year contract with Palace in August 2005.

Johnson was soon playing alongside Clinton Morrison, who had rejoined Palace from Birmingham for a fee of £2 million, three years after Birmingham had bought him in a deal for £4.25 million plus Johnson. However, due to injury to Johnson, and Morrison's lack of form, the pairing was limited in the early part of the season. With a return to fitness and form, the two soon became Dowie's first choice pairing as the season progressed, with Dougie Freedman adding experience to the strike force.

Palace comfortably made it into a top-six position but in the play-offs failed to recover from a first leg defeat at the hands of Watford, being beaten on aggregate in the semi-final. Johnson scored 15 goals in the Championship that season.

In 2005, Johnson was voted into Palace's Centenary XI, the only player at the club at the time to be selected, and, together with Nigel Martyn, the only members of the XI then playing on a professional basis.

=== Everton ===
After Crystal Palace's failure to return to top-flight football, speculation about Johnson's future at the club began with a transfer to a Premier League club seeming highly likely. However, when an initial bid from Everton of £7.25 million was rejected, it looked more likely that the club would be able to keep Johnson for a further year after all. Nevertheless, the departure of manager Iain Dowie only increased the likelihood of Johnson's departure, and on 24 May 2006 Palace accepted an £8.5m million offer from Wigan Athletic for Johnson. This bid was matched by fellow Lancashire club Bolton Wanderers a day later, which was also accepted.

With Johnson having indicated a preference for a move to Merseyside, Everton, prompted by the two other bids, improved their offer to £8.6 million the following day. On 30 May 2006, he passed his medical and completed the move to Goodison Park, signing a five-year contract. Johnson's move set new club transfer records, both as Everton's most expensive purchase and Palace's most expensive sale.

Johnson scored his first goal for Everton on his debut on 19 August 2006, in a 2–1 win over Watford. He continued a good start to his Everton career by scoring against Tottenham Hotspur away to end a 21-year victory drought there and then scoring twice in the 3–0 derby victory against Liverpool. Johnson was Everton's top scorer in the 2006–07 FA Premier League with 11 goals (and one in the FA Cup). However, Johnson was allegedly affected by allegations of simulation, going 13 matches without scoring a goal at one stage.

After a league match with Chelsea on 17 December 2006, Chelsea manager José Mourinho branded Johnson "untrustworthy" following a challenge with Chelsea goalkeeper Henrique Hilário. Everton issued a statement threatening legal action and calling on Mourinho to apologise, which he did two days later. Mourinho was not the first to air such sentiments about Johnson; former Sheffield United manager Neil Warnock also having accused Johnson of resorting to "gamesmanship" to win a penalty in a Premier League match between the two clubs.

Everton manager David Moyes took the unusual step of contacting the Professional Game Match Officials Board in order to counter these accusations. The board's general manager Keith Hackett agreed that Johnson was being treated harshly and had been denied several clear penalties.

On 6 November 2007, Johnson signed a new five-year contract with Everton. During the new season, Johnson scored some vital goals for Everton, including a Premier League winner away to West Ham. He scored Everton's first goal in the 2–1 away victory against Wigan Athletic, and was denied a winning goal at Blackburn Rovers, adjudged to have been offside.

Johnson scored twice in Everton's 6–1 thrashing of SK Brann in the UEFA Cup. He scored Everton's second and sixth goal and the last goal was a driven shot from outside the box. Johnson also scored in Everton's Round of 16 tie against Fiorentina. He picked up a groin injury in Everton's match at the Craven Cottage against Fulham.

=== Fulham ===
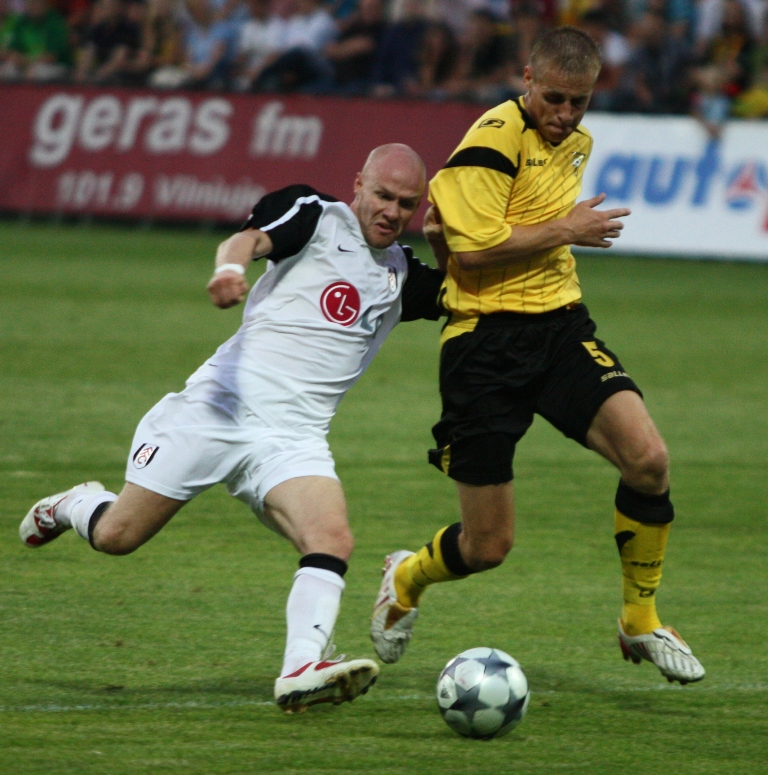
Johnson (left) playing for Fulham in 2009

In July 2008, Everton accepted an offer of "an eight figure sum" from Fulham for Johnson. It was reported that problems had arisen from his medical, prompting a possible renegotiation of the fee, but the move was completed on 7 August 2008, the player signing a four-year contract for an undisclosed fee, thought to be in the region of £10.5 million. He made his debut for the club in a 2–1 win over Bolton Wanderers at Craven Cottage on 13 September 2008. Johnson was sent off against West Ham United on 27 September 2008 for two bookable offences. He scored his first and second Fulham goals against Wigan Athletic on 29 October 2008.

Johnson finished the 2008–09 season with 10 goals helping Fulham to finish in seventh place and qualify for the UEFA Europa League. He made only 13 appearances for Fulham in 2009–10, scoring three goals, as he missed much of the season due to a troublesome knee problem. He also missed most of the early part of the 2010–11 season with injury. He made a good start to the 2011–12 season, scoring a Premier League hat-trick on 2 October in the 6–0 win over West London rivals Queens Park Rangers. Johnson also scored twice in Fulham's 4–1 win over Wisła Kraków on 4 November 2011, putting them on the brink of securing a place in the knockout stages of the UEFA Europa League. These goals were Johnson's seventh and eighth in the UEFA Europa League; he also scored against NSÍ Runavík, Crusaders, RNK Split, Twente and Odense.

Johnson's contract at Fulham expired in June 2012 and he was released after four years at the club.

=== Queens Park Rangers ===
In June 2012, Johnson signed for Queens Park Rangers on a two-year contract. Johnson made his debut as a substitute in the first match of the season at home against Swansea City. Johnson made his first start away at Manchester City, providing an assist for Bobby Zamora's equalising goal. On 17 September 2012, it was announced that Johnson was likely to miss the majority of the season with a cruciate ligament injury. In August 2013, Johnson scored the winning goal in Queens Park Rangers' opening fixture of the Championship season against Sheffield Wednesday. He was released on 1 July 2014 following the end of his contract.

=== Return to Crystal Palace ===
On 3 September 2014, Johnson signed a short-term contract with Crystal Palace on a free transfer, and was given some coaching responsibility with academy players. He left the club at the start of January 2015 when that contract expired, having made a solitary appearance in the League Cup.

On 30 March 2016, Johnson returned to Crystal Palace as an ambassador. His duties would again involve some coaching responsibility as well as involvement with the community.

== International career ==
Johnson was first capped for England at U20 level, being selected in the team for the 1999 FIFA World Youth Championship alongside Stuart Taylor, Ashley Cole, Peter Crouch and Matthew Etherington. The team finished bottom of their group, losing all three matches without scoring.

As the top English goalscorer in the 2004–05 Premier League, there were many calling for him to be selected for the full England squad. Midway through the season, Johnson revealed that he would accept a call-up to the national team of Poland, after being eligible through his grandfather being born in Poland. This subsequently hurried then England manager Sven-Göran Eriksson into giving Johnson his first call-up, to face the Netherlands on 9 February 2005, and he made his first international appearance in that match.

A second cap came when Johnson made his full debut for England, in a 2–1 friendly win over the United States, during England's tour of America in the summer of 2005. On 9 May 2006, Johnson was put on standby by Eriksson in his squad for the 2006 World Cup in Germany. He was also an unused substitute in the England B match against Belarus and the first team's wins over Hungary and Jamaica.

When Steve McClaren was installed as England coach, Johnson got further opportunities to play for his country in the UEFA Euro 2008 qualifiers. Johnson made substitute appearances against Andorra (at Old Trafford on 2 September 2006) and away to Macedonia (on 6 September 2006). Johnson then made his first competitive start for England in the Euro 2008 qualifier with Israel.

== Post-retirement life ==
Johnson now runs a property company, and also works for BAND, a business advisory firm. In February 2024, Johnson was appointed to the role of director of football at AFC Croydon Athletic, a non-league club.

== Career statistics ==
=== Club ===
Appearances and goals by club, season and competition
Club	Season	League			FA Cup		League Cup		Europe		Other		Total	
Club	Season	Division	Apps	Goals	Apps	Goals	Apps	Goals	Apps	Goals	Apps	Goals	Apps	Goals
Birmingham City	1998–99	First Division	3	0	0	0	2	0	—		—		5	0
Birmingham City	1999–2000	First Division	23	1	0	0	5	1	—		2 (Note: Appearances in First Division play-offs)	0	30	2
Birmingham City	2000–01	First Division	34	4	0	0	7	3	—		0	0	41	7
Birmingham City	2001–02	First Division	23	3	1	0	2	1	—		2	0	28	4
Birmingham City	Total		83	8	1	0	16	5	—		4	0	104	13
Crystal Palace	2002–03	First Division	28	11	3	0	3	3	—		—		34	14
Crystal Palace	2003–04	First Division	42	27	1	0	3	4	—		3	1	49	32
Crystal Palace	2004–05	Premier League	37	21	1	1	0	0	—		—		38	22
Crystal Palace	2005–06	Championship	33	15	3	2	1	0	—		2 (Note: Appearances in Championship play-offs)	0	39	17
Crystal Palace	Total		140	74	8	3	7	7	—		5	1	160	85
Everton	2006–07	Premier League	32	11	1	1	2	0	—		—		35	12
Everton	2007–08	Premier League	29	6	1	0	2	0	7 (Note: Appearances in UEFA Cup)	4	—		39	10
Everton	Total		61	17	2	1	4	0	7	4	—		74	22
Fulham	2008–09	Premier League	31	7	4	3	1	0	—		—		36	10
Fulham	2009–10	Premier League	8	0	1	0	0	0	4 (Note: Appearances in UEFA Europa League)	3	—		13	3
Fulham	2010–11	Premier League	27	3	2	0	0	0	—		—		29	3
Fulham	2011–12	Premier League	20	3	1	0	0	0	13	8	—		34	11
Fulham	Total		86	13	8	3	1	0	17	11	—		112	27
Queens Park Rangers	2012–13	Premier League	3	0	0	0	1	0	—		—		4	0
Queens Park Rangers	2013–14	Championship	17	2	1	0	2	0	—		0	0	20	2
Queens Park Rangers	Total		20	2	1	0	3	0	—		0	0	24	2
Crystal Palace	2014–15	Premier League	0	0	0	0	1	0	—		—		1	0
Career total			390	114	20	7	32	12	24	15	9	1	475	149

=== International ===
Appearances and goals by national team and year
National team	Year	Apps	Goals
England	2005	2	0
England	2006	3	0
England	2007	3	0
Total		8	0

== Honours ==
Birmingham City

- Football League First Division play-offs: 2002
- Football League Cup runner-up: 2000–01

Crystal Palace

- Football League First Division play-offs: 2004

Individual

- Premier League Player of the Month: October 2004, September 2006
- PFA Team of the Year: 2003–04 First Division, 2004–05 Premier League
- Crystal Palace Player of the Year: 2003–04, 2004–05
