= Iain Dowie =

Northern Irish football manager (born 1965)

Personal information
- Date of birth: 9 January 1965 (age 61)
- Place of birth: Hatfield, Hertfordshire, England
- Height: 6 ft 1 in (1.85 m)
- Position: Striker

Youth career
- Southampton

Senior career*
Years	Team	Apps	(Gls)
1983–1985	Cheshunt	34	(2)
1985–1986	St Albans City	53	(13)
1986–1988	Hendon	87	(47)
1988–1991	Luton Town	66	(15)
1989	→ Fulham (loan)	5	(1)
1991	West Ham United	12	(4)
1991–1995	Southampton	122	(30)
1995	Crystal Palace	19	(6)
1995–1998	West Ham United	68	(8)
1998–2001	Queens Park Rangers	31	(2)
Total		497	(128)

International career
1990–1999	Northern Ireland	59	(12)

Managerial career
- 1998: Queens Park Rangers (caretaker)
- 2002–2003: Oldham Athletic
- 2003–2006: Crystal Palace
- 2006: Charlton Athletic
- 2007–2008: Coventry City
- 2008: Queens Park Rangers
- 2010: Hull City
- * Club domestic league appearances and goals

Iain Dowie (born 9 January 1965) is a football manager, former professional footballer and sports television pundit.

He played as a striker from 1983 until 2001, notably in the Premier League for Southampton, Crystal Palace and West Ham United. He earned 59 caps for Northern Ireland, scoring 12 goals. He also played in the Football League for Luton Town, Fulham and Queens Park Rangers, and in Non-league for Cheshunt, St Albans City and Hendon.

After retiring from playing he went on to manage Oldham Athletic, Crystal Palace, Charlton Athletic, Coventry City, Queens Park Rangers before joining Hull City in a football management consultant role. He has since worked as a pundit largely for Sky Sports.

== Club career ==
Born in Hatfield, Hertfordshire, Dowie was rejected by Southampton aged 16 and later went to the University of Hertfordshire to study for a MEng degree in engineering. On completion he became an employee of British Aerospace, whilst keeping up football at non-League level playing for Cheshunt alongside his brother Bob. He left Cheshunt to improve his fitness and signed for St Albans City, then moved on to Hendon. While playing for Hendon, Dowie was spotted by Luton Town who signed him in the 1988–89 season, when they were in the First Division. He then moved in quick succession to Fulham (a brief loan spell), before establishing himself as a first team player in the 1989–90 season when his eight goals in 29 league games helped Luton finish seventeenth.

On 22 March 1991, with Luton still in the First Division and Dowie still a first team regular with seven goals from 29 games that season, Dowie agreed to join Second Division promotion chasers West Ham United for a fee of £480,000. He proved himself to be a competent deputy for the injured Trevor Morley as his four goals in the final 12 league games of the season secured the team's promotion as Second Division runners-up. But when the 1991–92 season began, Morley had returned to fitness and Dowie found himself on the sidelines until his £500,000 move to Southampton on 3 September 1991 after less than six months at Upton Park.

He played alongside Alan Shearer and Matthew Le Tissier – two of the country's highest regarded strikers in the early 1990s – and scored nine goals in 30 league games to ensure that the team finished high enough for a place in the newly formed FA Premier League. His good form continued in the 1992–93 season, despite the loss of Shearer, as he scored 11 league goals. His tally dropped to five goals in 39 games during the 1993–94 season, though the club avoided relegation again, and he managed another five goals from 17 league games in the 1994–95 season before manager Alan Ball decided that he wanted younger partners for Le Tissier in attack, signing Gordon Watson and Neil Shipperley while dropping Craig Maskell and selling Dowie to Crystal Palace for £400,000 on 13 January 1995.

His spell at Palace was a frustrating one; he was cup-tied for the League Cup semi-finals against Liverpool, and Palace reached the FA Cup semi-finals where they lost to Manchester United after a replay. Lastly, despite a dynamic fightback after being three goals down to Newcastle United on the final day of the season, they still lost 3–2 and were relegated from the Premier League one season after promotion.

He then spent nearly three years back at West Ham. During his second stint with the Hammers, he came under fire from the supporters for going long periods without scoring at a time when the club were suffering a crisis in attack and goals were in short supply. Dowie is probably best remembered by West Ham fans for scoring a bizarre headed own goal in an infamous defeat to Stockport County in the League Cup in front of the live Sky cameras at Edgeley Park. Dowie then moved across London to Queens Park Rangers (QPR), where he ended his days playing in defence, and being player-manager of QPR's reserve team. Dowie also had a brief spell as caretaker manager of QPR in the autumn of 1998, between the dismissal of Ray Harford and appointment of Gerry Francis.

== International career ==
Dowie's father was born in Belfast, thus qualifying him to play for Northern Ireland, for whom Dowie gained 59 caps and scored 12 goals.

== Managerial career ==
=== Oldham Athletic ===
After retirement from playing, Dowie then became assistant manager of Oldham Athletic. However, following the dismissal of manager Mick Wadsworth, Dowie became manager and led the club into the Second Division play-offs in the 2002–03 season after spending heavily. However, financial trouble hit Oldham and Dowie lost much of his first team squad. Funds were so hard for the club at the time that Dowie along with the remaining members of the squad were not paid for several months. Dowie tried to stick out the post for as long as possible until he decided to move on citing the need to support his family as a reason.

=== Crystal Palace ===
On 21 December 2003, Dowie was appointed manager of Crystal Palace, inheriting a squad with low morale and occupying 19th place in Division One. However, under his leadership, the club went on an impressive run that included 17 wins from 23 games after he took over, until the end of the season, enabling the club to finish in sixth place in the First Division, just scraping into the play-off places. This feat was attributed to complete change in the atmosphere and training regime at the club, including a tougher disciplinary regime, introduced by Dowie. After beating Sunderland in the semi-final, on a penalty shootout, the club beat Dowie's former club West Ham by a single goal in the Final for a place in the FA Premier League.

Dowie's squad contained some promising footballers, including Andrew Johnson. Dowie made a couple of signings for the 2004–05 season: he signed goalkeeper Gabor Kiraly to challenge Julián Speroni for the number 1 top. Kiraly was first choice throughout the season. The club lasted only one season there, being relegated on the final day of the season when Charlton Athletic scored a late equaliser in a 2–2 draw.

Dowie remained at Palace in the Championship. Portsmouth chairman Milan Mandarić approached Palace chairman Simon Jordan to speak to Dowie, in November 2005. Jordan refused this approach, and for the meantime Dowie stayed. After losing the play-off semi final to eventual winners Watford, Dowie left Crystal Palace by "mutual consent" on 22 May 2006 following discussions with chairman Jordan.

Dowie had been allowed to leave without compensation as he had stated his wish to be nearer to his family in Bolton. Jordan was infuriated when just eight days later, on 30 May 2006, Premier League club Charlton unveiled Dowie as their new manager. Jordan then issued Dowie with a writ, claiming that he had misled him about his reasons for leaving Crystal Palace. Dowie, however, insisted this was not the case, and was publicly backed by both Charlton Chief Executive Peter Varney, who branded the writ "a sad and pathetic publicity stunt", and chairman Richard Murray, who was adamant that his legal team could find no grounds for the writ to be upheld, and suggested that there may be more personal reasons behind the writ being issued. The case was heard in the London High Court in the summer of 2007, and on 14 June The Hon. Mr Justice Tugendhat ruled that Dowie had "deceived" Jordan and made "false representations" in conversations with Crystal Palace on 20 and 22 May, stating he had had no contact with Charlton when he had in fact spoken to them on 17 and 22 May. Dowie was ordered to pay Palace's legal bill, estimated at up to £400,000 and a similar amount to his own legal team in addition to compensation due to Crystal Palace. Dowie won the right to appeal and thus the case dragged on. In 2008 an out-of-court agreement between Dowie and Crystal Palace was reached "on terms acceptable to Crystal Palace Football Club".

=== Charlton Athletic ===
When Dowie took over at The Valley, he was given more money than any previous manager to spend on players. He signed Jimmy Floyd Hasselbaink, and Scott Carson on loan, but was unable to prevent the team suffering a disastrous start to the Premier League season. Despite this, the team reached the quarter-final of the League Cup for the first time in their history. However, Dowie was unable to lift the team away from the relegation zone of the Premier League and build on the success of former manager Alan Curbishley, resulting in him and the club parting company on 13 November 2006, after just 15 games in charge.

Soon after his departure from Charlton, in December 2006, he was linked with the vacant managers job at Hull City, but he turned down the position.

=== Coventry City ===
Dowie was unveiled as Coventry City manager on 19 February 2007. He found immediate success at the club with a number of wins but towards the end of the season their form dropped off and the Sky Blues finished 17th in the Championship table.

On 29 August, Dowie was linked with the vacant manager's position at Leicester City following the dismissal of Martin Allen. Coventry City dismissed claims that an approach was made and that any approach would be "firmly rebuffed". These rumours renewed again on 24 October when Gary Megson left Leicester to manage Bolton Wanderers. Dowie refused to comment on the speculation. On 11 February 2008, Dowie was released from his contract as Coventry manager, which was officially cited as being due to significant differences of opinion between the management team and the Board as to how the club should be going forward.

=== Queens Park Rangers ===
On 14 May 2008, Queens Park Rangers appointed Dowie as their new first team coach following the previous week's departure of Luigi de Canio. He was sacked as manager of QPR after just 15 games in charge on 24 October, with the team in ninth position in the league.

=== Newcastle United ===
On 1 April 2009, Newcastle United appointed Alan Shearer as manager until the end of the season, with Dowie being appointed to his coaching staff.

=== Hull City ===
Dowie was named as the temporary "Football Management Consultant" of Premier League team Hull City on 17 March 2010, after manager Phil Brown was placed on gardening leave. He was faced with the challenge of guiding the Yorkshire club to Premier League safety in order to secure them a third season in the top flight; however, the challenge was effectively ended on 24 April 2010 when Hull were beaten 1–0 at home by Sunderland and fellow relegation battlers West Ham United (a club that Dowie served twice as a player) won their game 3–2 against a Wigan Athletic side still faced with an outside chance of relegation. Hull City were relegated on 3 May 2010 after an injury time equaliser from Wigan Athletic's Steve Gohouri made their game 2–2, ending Hull's hopes of survival with one game to go.

== Personal life ==
Dowie worked as a commentator for Sky Sports News.

His niece Natasha Dowie is an international footballer who played for Charlton Athletic Women while he was manager of the men's team. Dowie has two sons, Oliver and William. Dowie's brother, Bob, was a semi-professional footballer and manager and worked alongside Iain as Director of Football at Crystal Palace.

In March 2016, Dowie was employed as Regional Sales Manager for "Go To Surveys".

He coined the word 'bouncebackability' which entered the Oxford English Dictionary in 2005.

Dowie suffered a cardiac arrest in March 2024 during an exercise class in Chorley.

== Playing statistics ==
=== Club ===
Appearances and goals by club, season and competition
Club	Season	League			FA Cup		League Cup		Other		Total	
Club	Season	Division	Apps	Goals	Apps	Goals	Apps	Goals	Apps	Goals	Apps	Goals
St Albans City
St Albans City	1984–85	Isthmian Division 1	13	3	0	0	—		—		13	3
St Albans City	1985–86	Isthmian Division 1	29	9	0	0	—		4 (Note: Appearances in Isthmian League Cup (1 appearance, 1 goal), Herts Senior Cup (2 appearance) and Amateur Cup (1 appearance))	1	33	10
St Albans City	1986–87	Isthmian Premier	11	1	1	0	—		3 (Note: Appearances in Isthmian League Cup (1 appearance, 1 goal), Herts Charity Cup (2 appearance) and FA Trophy (1 appearance))	1	15	2
St Albans City	Total		53	13	1	0	0	0	7	2	61	15
Hendon
Hendon	1986–87	Isthmian Premier	31	17	0	0	—		15 (Note: Appearances in GM Associates Cup (7 appearance, 3 goals), Middlesex Senior Cup (5 appearance, 1 goal) and London Senior Cup (3 appearances, 2 goals))	6	46	23
Hendon	1987–88	Isthmian Premier	39	19	2	0	—		15 (Note: Appearances in Isthmian League Cup (2 appearances, 1 goal), Premier Inter-League Cup (1 appearance), FA Trophy (4 appearances, 2 goals), Middlesex Senior Cup (2 appearances), Middlesex Charity Cup (4 appearances, 6 goals) and London Senior Cup (2 appearances))	9	56	28
Hendon	1988–89	Isthmian Premier	17	11	6	10	—		7 (Note: Appearances in Isthmian League Cup (4 appearances, 3 goals), Premier Inter-League Cup (1 appearance, 1 goal) and FA Trophy (2 appearances, 2 goals))	6	30	27
Hendon	Total		87	47	8	10	0	0	37	21	132	78
Luton Town
Luton Town	1988–89	First Division	8	0	0	0	1	0	1 (Note: Appearances in Full Members' Cup)	1	10	1
Luton Town	1989–90	First Division	29	8	1	0	1	0	2	3	33	11
Luton Town	1990–91	First Division	29	7	2	0	2	0	2	0	35	7
Luton Town	Total		66	15	3	0	4	0	5	4	78	19
Fulham (loan)	1989–90	Third Division	5	1	0	0	0	0	—		5	1
West Ham United	1990–91	Second Division	12	4	—		—		—		12	4
Southampton
Southampton	1991–92	First Division	30	9	4	0	4	0	4	0	42	9
Southampton	1992–93	Premier League	36	11	0	0	2	1	—		38	12
Southampton	1993–94	Premier League	39	5	2	1	2	0	—		43	6
Southampton	1994–95	Premier League	17	5	0	0	3	0	—		20	5
Southampton	Total		122	30	6	1	11	1	4	0	143	32
Crystal Palace
Crystal Palace	1994–95	Premier League	15	4	6	4	—		—		21	8
Crystal Palace	1995–96	First Division	4	2	0	0	0	0	—		4	2
Crystal Palace	Total		19	6	6	4	0	0	0	0	25	10
West Ham United
West Ham United	1995–96	Premier League	33	8	3	1	3	0	—		39	9
West Ham United	1996–97	Premier League	23	0	0	0	5	2	—		28	2
West Ham United	1997–98	Premier League	12	0	1	0	3	0	—		16	0
West Ham United	Total		68	8	4	1	11	2	0	0	83	11
Queens Park Rangers
Queens Park Rangers	1997–98	First Division	11	1	0	0	0	0	—		11	1
Queens Park Rangers	1998–99	First Division	19	1	1	0	1	0	—		21	1
Queens Park Rangers	1999–2000	First Division	0	0	1	0	0	0	—		1	0
Queens Park Rangers	2000–01	First Division	1	0	0	0	0	0	—		1	0
Queens Park Rangers	Total		31	2	2	0	1	0	0	0	34	2
Career total			463	126	30	16	27	3	53	27	573	172

=== International ===
Appearances and goals by national team and year
National team	Year	Apps	Goals
Northern Ireland	1990	5	0
Northern Ireland	1991	5	1
Northern Ireland	1992	3	0
Northern Ireland	1993	8	1
Northern Ireland	1994	6	1
Northern Ireland	1995	7	5
Northern Ireland	1996	6	2
Northern Ireland	1997	6	1
Northern Ireland	1998	6	1
Northern Ireland	1999	7	0
Total		59	12

Scores and results list Northern Ireland's goal tally first.

#	Date	Venue	Opponent	Score	Result	Competition
1	16 October 1991	Belfast, Northern Ireland	Austria	1–0	2–1	UEFA Euro 1992 qualifying
2	25 May 1993	Vilnius, Lithuania	Lithuania	1–0	1–0	1994 FIFA World Cup qualification
3	20 April 1994	Belfast, Northern Ireland	Liechtenstein	4–0	4–1	1994 FIFA World Cup qualification
4	29 March 1995	Dublin, Ireland	Republic of Ireland	1–0	1–1	UEFA Euro 1996 qualifying
5	26 April 1995	Riga, Latvia	Latvia	1–0	1–0	UEFA Euro 1996 qualifying
6	25 May 1995	Edmonton, Canada	Chile	1–0	1–2	Friendly match
7	7 June 1995	Belfast, Northern Ireland	Latvia	1–0	1–2	UEFA Euro 1996 qualifying
8	15 November 1995	Belfast, Northern Ireland	Austria	2–0	5–3	UEFA Euro 1996 qualifying
9	14 December 1996	Belfast, Northern Ireland	Albania	1–0	2–0	1998 FIFA World Cup qualification
10	14 December 1996	Belfast, Northern Ireland	Albania	2–0	2–0	1998 FIFA World Cup qualification
11	2 April 1997	Kyiv, Ukraine	Ukraine	1–0	1–2	1998 FIFA World Cup qualification
12	18 November 1998	Belfast, Northern Ireland	Moldova	1–1	2–2	UEFA Euro 2000 qualifying

== Managerial statistics ==
As of 9 May 2010

Team	Nation	From	To	Matches	Won	Drawn	Lost	Win %
Queens Park Rangers (caretaker)	England	28 September 1998	16 October 1998	2	1	0	1	50.00
Oldham Athletic	England	31 May 2002	19 December 2003	82	31	28	23	37.80
Crystal Palace	England	22 December 2003	22 May 2006	123	50	29	44	40.65
Charlton Athletic	England	30 May 2006	13 November 2006	15	4	3	8	26.67
Coventry City	England	19 February 2007	11 February 2008	49	20	8	21	40.82
Queens Park Rangers	England	14 May 2008	24 October 2008	15	8	3	4	53.33
Hull City	England	17 March 2010	9 May 2010	9	1	3	5	11.11
Total				295	115	74	106	38.98

== Honours ==
=== As a player ===
Southampton

- Full Members' Cup runner-up: 1991–92

=== As a manager ===
Crystal Palace

- Football League First Division play-offs: 2004

Individual

- Football League First Division Manager of the Month: January 2004
