= 2004–05 FA Premier League =

English football season

FA Premier League
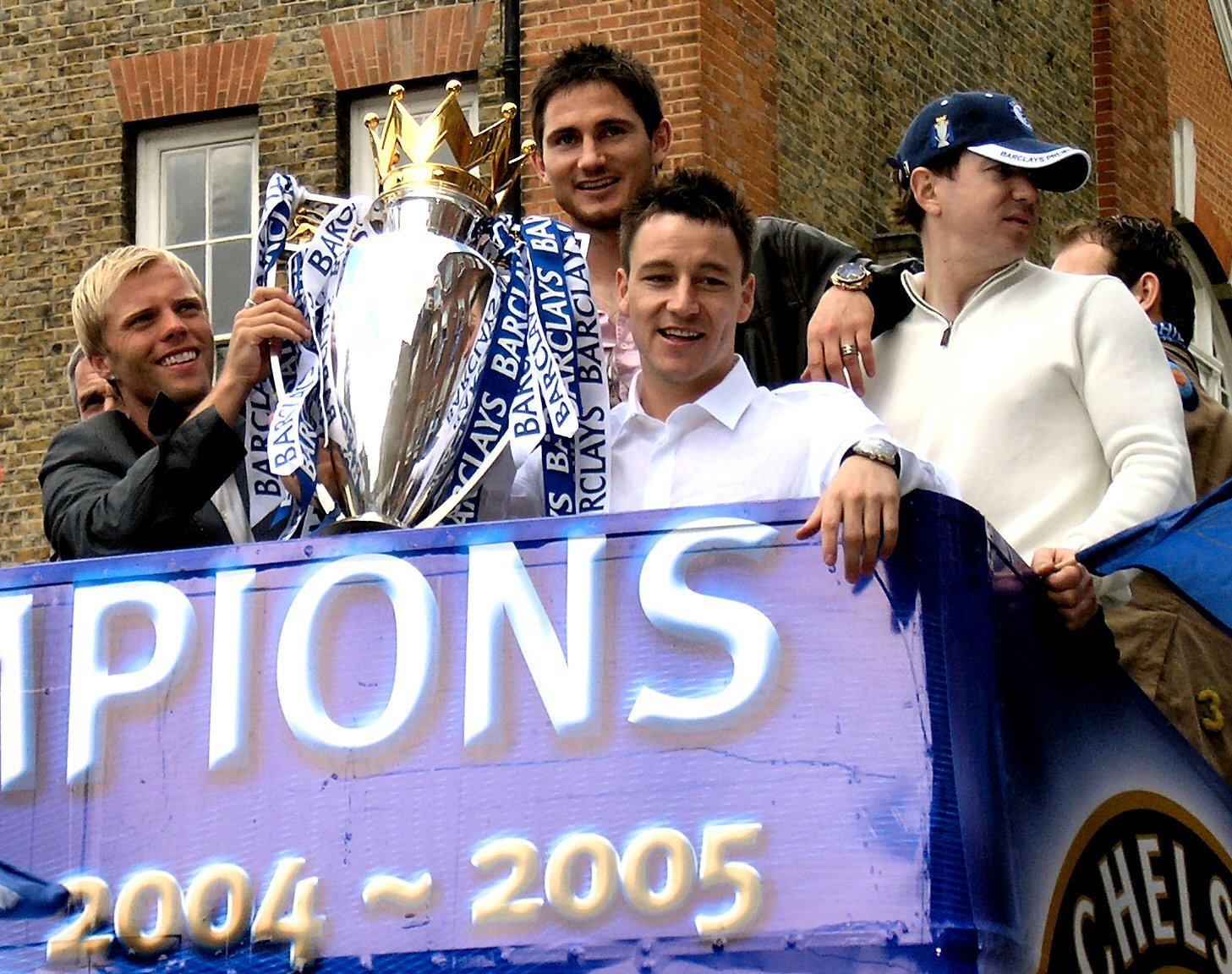
- Season: 2004–05
- Dates: 14 August 2004 – 15 May 2005
- Champions: Chelsea; 1st Premier League title 2nd English title
- Relegated: Crystal Palace; Norwich City; Southampton
- Champions League: Chelsea; Arsenal; Manchester United; Everton; Liverpool (as Champions League winners)
- UEFA Cup: Bolton Wanderers; Middlesbrough
- Intertoto Cup: Newcastle United
- Matches: 380
- Goals: 975 (2.57 per match)
- Top goalscorer: Thierry Henry (25 goals)
- Best goalkeeper: Petr Čech (24 clean sheets)
- Biggest home win: Arsenal 7–0 Everton (11 May 2005)
- Biggest away win: West Bromwich Albion 0–5 Liverpool (26 December 2004)
- Highest scoring: Tottenham Hotspur 4–5 Arsenal (13 November 2004)
- Longest winning run: 8 games Chelsea
- Longest unbeaten run: 29 games Chelsea
- Longest winless run: 15 games West Bromwich Albion
- Longest losing run: 6 games Bolton Wanderers; Tottenham Hotspur
- Highest attendance: 67,989; Manchester United 2–1 Portsmouth (26 February 2005)
- Lowest attendance: 16,180; Fulham 1–0 West Bromwich Albion (16 January 2005)
- Total attendance: 12,882,140
- Average attendance: 33,900

The 2004–05 FA Premier League (known as the FA Barclays Premiership for sponsorship reasons) was the 13th season of the Premier League. It began on 14 August 2004 and ended on 15 May 2005. Arsenal were the defending champions after going unbeaten the previous season. Chelsea won the title with a then record 95 points, which was previously set by Manchester United in the 1993–94 season, and later surpassed by Manchester City in the 2017–18 season (100), securing the title with a 2–0 win at the Reebok Stadium against Bolton Wanderers. Chelsea also broke a number of other records during their campaign, most notably breaking the record of most games won in a single Premier League campaign, securing 29 wins in the league in home and away matches, which they later surpassed in the 2016–17 season.

== Season summary ==
Arsenal were the favourites to defend their title after finishing the previous season unbeaten, but they also faced competition in the form of regular challengers Manchester United and Chelsea, the latter under the new management of Portuguese José Mourinho, who had just won the UEFA Champions League with Porto. Liverpool also had a new manager in Spaniard Rafael Benítez, who had just won La Liga and the UEFA Cup with Valencia and were expected to challenge for the title too. Another managerial change at a club aiming for the top was at Tottenham Hotspur, who appointed Jacques Santini, who had just led France to the quarter-finals of the 2004 European Championship.

At the other end of the table, amongst those tipped for relegation were Norwich City, Crystal Palace and West Bromwich Albion, having all just been promoted from the First Division (rebranded this season as the Championship). Everton, Manchester City, Blackburn Rovers and Portsmouth were also tipped to struggle, the first three finishing just outside the relegation places the previous season and Portsmouth being in their second season.

Arsenal's record-breaking unbeaten streak of 49 games ended on 24 October 2004, when Manchester United beat them 2–0 at Old Trafford.

=== Relegation ===
For the first time since the advent of the Premier League in 1992, no team was relegated before the final day of the season. In each of the last three weekends of the season, the team that was bottom of the table at the start of the weekend finished it outside the drop zone. The final round of the season began with West Bromwich Albion at the bottom, Southampton and Crystal Palace one point ahead and Norwich City a further point ahead, in the last safe spot. West Brom, who had been bottom of the table and eight points from safety on Christmas Day, did their part by beating Portsmouth 2–0. Norwich, the only side to have their fate completely in their own hands, lost 6–0 to Fulham and went down. Southampton took the lead against Manchester United within 10 minutes through a John O'Shea own goal, but ultimately lost the match 2–1 and were also relegated. Crystal Palace, away to Charlton Athletic, were leading 2–1 after 71 minutes, but with eight minutes to go, Jonathan Fortune equalised for Charlton to send their South East London rivals down. Had Palace won they would have stayed up; instead they became the first team to be relegated from the Premier League four times. As a result, West Brom stayed up, becoming the first club in Premier League history to avoid relegation after being bottom of the table at Christmas.

As all four matches ended, cameras focused on West Brom's home ground, The Hawthorns, as confirmation of other results began to filter through. Once the realisation dawned on the players and fans that survival had been achieved, a mass pitch invasion was sparked, with huge celebrations. The Portsmouth fans joined in the celebrations as, through losing, they had "helped" relegate arch-rivals Southampton.

== Teams ==
Twenty teams competed in the league – the top seventeen teams from the previous season and the three teams promoted from the First Division. The promoted teams were Norwich City, West Bromwich Albion and Crystal Palace, returning to the top flight after an absence of nine, one and six years respectively. The promoted teams replaced Leicester City, Leeds United and Wolverhampton Wanderers, who were relegated to the newly branded Championship. Leicester City and Wolverhampton Wanderers were both relegated after a season's presence while Leeds United ended their top flight spell of fourteen years.

=== Stadiums and locations ===
Locations of the 2004–05 Premier League teams
Greater London Premier League football clubs
West Midlands Premier League football clubs

Team	Location	Stadium	Capacity
Arsenal	London (Highbury)	Arsenal Stadium	38,419
Aston Villa	Birmingham (Aston)	Villa Park	42,553
Birmingham City	Birmingham (Bordesley)	St Andrew's	30,079
Blackburn Rovers	Blackburn	Ewood Park	31,367
Bolton Wanderers	Bolton	Reebok Stadium	28,723
Charlton Athletic	London (Charlton)	The Valley	27,111
Chelsea	London (Fulham)	Stamford Bridge	42,360
Crystal Palace	London (Selhurst)	Selhurst Park	25,073
Everton	Liverpool (Walton)	Goodison Park	40,569
Fulham	London (Fulham)	Craven Cottage (Note: Fulham returned to Craven Cottage this season after a two-year refurbishment took place at their home ground.)	24,600
Liverpool	Liverpool (Anfield)	Anfield	45,276
Manchester City	Manchester (Bradford)	City of Manchester Stadium	48,000
Manchester United	Manchester (Old Trafford)	Old Trafford	68,217
Middlesbrough	Middlesbrough	Riverside Stadium	35,049
Newcastle United	Newcastle upon Tyne	St James' Park	52,387
Norwich City	Norwich	Carrow Road	27,010
Portsmouth	Portsmouth	Fratton Park	20,220
Southampton	Southampton	St Mary's Stadium	32,505
Tottenham Hotspur	London (Tottenham)	White Hart Lane	36,240
West Bromwich Albion	West Bromwich	The Hawthorns	26,484

=== Personnel and kits ===
Team	Manager	Captain	Kit manufacturer	Shirt sponsor
Arsenal	(France) Arsène Wenger	(France) Patrick Vieira	Nike	O_{2}
Aston Villa	(Republic of Ireland) David O'Leary	(Sweden) Olof Mellberg	Hummel	DWS Investments
Birmingham City	(England) Steve Bruce	(Republic of Ireland) Kenny Cunningham	Diadora	Flybe
Blackburn Rovers	(Wales) Mark Hughes	(England) Garry Flitcroft	Lonsdale	HSA
Bolton Wanderers	(England) Sam Allardyce	(Nigeria) Jay-Jay Okocha	Reebok	Reebok
Charlton Athletic	(England) Alan Curbishley	(Republic of Ireland) Matt Holland	Joma	All:Sports
Chelsea	(Portugal) José Mourinho	(England) John Terry	Umbro	Emirates
Crystal Palace	(Northern Ireland) Iain Dowie	(Northern Ireland) Michael Hughes	Diadora	Churchill
Everton	(Scotland) David Moyes	(Scotland) David Weir	Umbro	Chang
Fulham	(Wales) Chris Coleman	(England) Lee Clark	Puma	dabs.com
Liverpool	(Spain) Rafael Benítez	(England) Steven Gerrard	Reebok	Carlsberg
Manchester City	(England) Stuart Pearce	(France) Sylvain Distin	Reebok	Thomas Cook
Manchester United	(Scotland) Alex Ferguson	(Republic of Ireland) Roy Keane	Nike	Vodafone
Middlesbrough	(England) Steve McClaren	(England) Gareth Southgate	Erreà	888.com
Newcastle United	(Scotland) Graeme Souness	(England) Alan Shearer	Adidas	Northern Rock
Norwich City	(Northern Ireland) Nigel Worthington	(England) Craig Fleming	Xara	Proton
Portsmouth	(France) Alain Perrin	(Netherlands) Arjan De Zeeuw	Pompey Sport	TY
Southampton	(England) Harry Redknapp	(Scotland) Nigel Quashie	Saints	Friends Provident
Tottenham Hotspur	(Netherlands) Martin Jol	(England) Ledley King	Kappa	Thomson Holidays
West Bromwich Albion	(England) Bryan Robson	(England) Kevin Campbell	Diadora	T-Mobile

=== Managerial changes ===
Team	Outgoing manager	Manner of departure	Date of vacancy	Position in table	Incoming manager	Date of appointment
Liverpool	(France) Gérard Houllier	Mutual consent	24 May 2004	Pre-season	(Spain) Rafael Benítez	16 June 2004
Chelsea	(Italy) Claudio Ranieri	Sacked	31 May 2004	Pre-season	(Portugal) José Mourinho	2 June 2004
Tottenham Hotspur	(England) David Pleat (caretaker)	End of caretaker spell	1 June 2004	Pre-season	(France) Jacques Santini	3 June 2004
Southampton	(Scotland) Paul Sturrock	Mutual consent	23 August 2004	10th	(England) Steve Wigley	23 August 2004
Newcastle United	(England) Sir Bobby Robson	Sacked	30 August 2004	17th	(Scotland) Graeme Souness	6 September 2004
Blackburn Rovers	(Scotland) Graeme Souness	Signed by Newcastle United	6 September 2004	19th	(Wales) Mark Hughes	16 September 2004
West Bromwich Albion	(England) Gary Megson	Sacked	26 October 2004	16th	(England) Bryan Robson	9 November 2004
Tottenham Hotspur	(France) Jacques Santini	Resigned	5 November 2004	11th	(Netherlands) Martin Jol	8 November 2004
Portsmouth	(England) Harry Redknapp	Resigned	24 November 2004	12th	(Croatia) Velimir Zajec	21 December 2004
Southampton	(England) Steve Wigley	Sacked	8 December 2004	18th	(England) Harry Redknapp	21 December 2004
Manchester City	(England) Kevin Keegan	Resigned	11 March 2005	12th	(England) Stuart Pearce (caretaker)	11 March 2005
Portsmouth	(Croatia) Velimir Zajec	Returned to director of football position	7 April 2005	16th	(France) Alain Perrin	7 April 2005
Manchester City	(England) Stuart Pearce (caretaker)	End of caretaker period	12 May 2005	8th	(England) Stuart Pearce	12 May 2005

== League table ==
Pos	Team	Pld	W	D	L	GF	GA	GD	Pts	Qualification or relegation
1	Chelsea (C)	38	29	8	1	72	15	+57	95	Qualification for the Champions League group stage
2	Arsenal	38	25	8	5	87	36	+51	83	Qualification for the Champions League group stage
3	Manchester United	38	22	11	5	58	26	+32	77	Qualification for the Champions League third qualifying round
4	Everton	38	18	7	13	45	46	−1	61	Qualification for the Champions League third qualifying round
5	Liverpool	38	17	7	14	52	41	+11	58	Qualification for the Champions League first qualifying round (Note: Although they failed to qualify for the Champions League as one of the top four English clubs, Liverpool were given a special dispensation to compete as the defending champions. They were, however, forced to enter in the first qualifying round.)
6	Bolton Wanderers	38	16	10	12	49	44	+5	58	Qualification for the UEFA Cup first round (Note: Since the finalists of the FA Cup, Arsenal and Manchester United, as well as Chelsea, who won the 2004–05 Football League Cup, were qualified for the Champions League, and the fifth-placed team (Liverpool) were moved to the Champions League, the sixth and seventh-placed teams in the Premier League were rewarded entry to the UEFA Cup.)
7	Middlesbrough	38	14	13	11	53	46	+7	55	Qualification for the UEFA Cup first round
8	Manchester City	38	13	13	12	47	39	+8	52	
9	Tottenham Hotspur	38	14	10	14	47	41	+6	52	
10	Aston Villa	38	12	11	15	45	52	−7	47	
11	Charlton Athletic	38	12	10	16	42	58	−16	46	
12	Birmingham City	38	11	12	15	40	46	−6	45	
13	Fulham	38	12	8	18	52	60	−8	44	
14	Newcastle United	38	10	14	14	47	57	−10	44	Qualification for the Intertoto Cup third round
15	Blackburn Rovers	38	9	15	14	32	43	−11	42	
16	Portsmouth	38	10	9	19	43	59	−16	39	
17	West Bromwich Albion	38	6	16	16	36	61	−25	34	
18	Crystal Palace (R)	38	7	12	19	41	62	−21	33	Relegation to the Football League Championship
19	Norwich City (R)	38	7	12	19	42	77	−35	33	Relegation to the Football League Championship
20	Southampton (R)	38	6	14	18	45	66	−21	32	Relegation to the Football League Championship

Rules for classification: 1) points; 2) goal difference; 3) number of goals scored.
(C) Champions; (R) Relegated

== Results ==
Home \ Away	ARS	AVL	BIR	BLB	BOL	CHA	CHE	CRY	EVE	FUL	LIV	MCI	MUN	MID	NEW	NOR	POR	SOU	TOT	WBA
Arsenal		3–1	3–0	3–0	2–2	4–0	2–2	5–1	7–0	2–0	3–1	1–1	2–4	5–3	1–0	4–1	3–0	2–2	1–0	1–1
Aston Villa	1–3		1–2	1–0	1–1	0–0	0–0	1–1	1–3	2–0	1–1	1–2	0–1	2–0	4–2	3–0	3–0	2–0	1–0	1–1
Birmingham City	2–1	2–0		2–1	1–2	1–1	0–1	0–1	0–1	1–2	2–0	1–0	0–0	2–0	2–2	1–1	0–0	2–1	1–1	4–0
Blackburn Rovers	0–1	2–2	3–3		0–1	1–0	0–1	1–0	0–0	1–3	2–2	0–0	1–1	0–4	2–2	3–0	1–0	3–0	0–1	1–1
Bolton Wanderers	1–0	1–2	1–1	0–1		4–1	0–2	1–0	3–2	3–1	1–0	0–1	2–2	0–0	2–1	1–0	0–1	1–1	3–1	1–1
Charlton Athletic	1–3	3–0	3–1	1–0	1–2		0–4	2–2	2–0	2–1	1–2	2–2	0–4	1–2	1–1	4–0	2–1	0–0	2–0	1–4
Chelsea	0–0	1–0	1–1	4–0	2–2	1–0		4–1	1–0	3–1	1–0	0–0	1–0	2–0	4–0	4–0	3–0	2–1	0–0	1–0
Crystal Palace	1–1	2–0	2–0	0–0	0–1	0–1	0–2		1–3	2–0	1–0	1–2	0–0	0–1	0–2	3–3	0–1	2–2	3–0	3–0
Everton	1–4	1–1	1–1	0–1	3–2	0–1	0–1	4–0		1–0	1–0	2–1	1–0	1–0	2–0	1–0	2–1	1–0	0–1	2–1
Fulham	0–3	1–1	2–3	0–2	2–0	0–0	1–4	3–1	2–0		2–4	1–1	1–1	0–2	1–3	6–0	3–1	1–0	2–0	1–0
Liverpool	2–1	2–1	0–1	0–0	1–0	2–0	0–1	3–2	2–1	3–1		2–1	0–1	1–1	3–1	3–0	1–1	1–0	2–2	3–0
Manchester City	0–1	2–0	3–0	1–1	0–1	4–0	1–0	3–1	0–1	1–1	1–0		0–2	1–1	1–1	1–1	2–0	2–1	0–1	1–1
Manchester United	2–0	3–1	2–0	0–0	2–0	2–0	1–3	5–2	0–0	1–0	2–1	0–0		1–1	2–1	2–1	2–1	3–0	0–0	1–1
Middlesbrough	0–1	3–0	2–1	1–0	1–1	2–2	0–1	2–1	1–1	1–1	2–0	3–2	0–2		2–2	2–0	1–1	1–3	1–0	4–0
Newcastle United	0–1	0–3	2–1	3–0	2–1	1–1	1–1	0–0	1–1	1–4	1–0	4–3	1–3	0–0		2–2	1–1	2–1	0–1	3–1
Norwich City	1–4	0–0	1–0	1–1	3–2	1–0	1–3	1–1	2–3	0–1	1–2	2–3	2–0	4–4	2–1		2–2	2–1	0–2	3–2
Portsmouth	0–1	1–2	1–1	0–1	1–1	4–2	0–2	3–1	0–1	4–3	1–2	1–3	2–0	2–1	1–1	1–1		4–1	1–0	3–2
Southampton	1–1	2–3	0–0	3–2	1–2	0–0	1–3	2–2	2–2	3–3	2–0	0–0	1–2	2–2	1–2	4–3	2–1		1–0	2–2
Tottenham Hotspur	4–5	5–1	1–0	0–0	1–2	2–3	0–2	1–1	5–2	2–0	1–1	2–1	0–1	2–0	1–0	0–0	3–1	5–1		1–1
West Bromwich Albion	0–2	1–1	2–0	1–1	2–1	0–1	1–4	2–2	1–0	1–1	0–5	2–0	0–3	1–2	0–0	0–0	2–0	0–0	1–1	

Source: Barclays Premier League
Legend: Blue = home team win; Yellow = draw; Red = away team win.

== Top scorers ==
Rank	Player	Club	Goals
1	(France) Thierry Henry	Arsenal	25
2	(England) Andy Johnson	Crystal Palace	21
3	(France) Robert Pires	Arsenal	14
4	(England) Jermain Defoe	Tottenham Hotspur	13
4	(Netherlands) Jimmy Floyd Hasselbaink	Middlesbrough	13
4	(England) Frank Lampard	Chelsea	13
4	(Nigeria) Yakubu	Portsmouth	13
8	(England) Andy Cole	Fulham	12
8	(England) Peter Crouch	Southampton	12
8	(Iceland) Eiður Guðjohnsen	Chelsea	12

== Awards ==
=== Monthly awards ===
Month	Manager of the Month	Player of the Month
August	(France) Arsène Wenger (Arsenal)	(Spain) José Antonio Reyes (Arsenal)
September	(Scotland) David Moyes (Everton)	(England) Ledley King (Tottenham Hotspur)
October	(England) Harry Redknapp (Portsmouth)	(England) Andy Johnson (Crystal Palace)
November	(Portugal) José Mourinho (Chelsea)	(Netherlands) Arjen Robben (Chelsea)
December	(Netherlands) Martin Jol (Tottenham Hotspur)	(England) Steven Gerrard (Liverpool)
January	(Portugal) José Mourinho (Chelsea)	(England) John Terry (Chelsea)
February	(Scotland) Sir Alex Ferguson (Manchester United)	(England) Wayne Rooney (Manchester United)
March	(England) Harry Redknapp (Southampton)	(England) Joe Cole (Chelsea)
April	(England) Stuart Pearce (Manchester City)	(England) Frank Lampard (Chelsea)

=== Annual awards ===
Award	Winner	Club
PFA Players' Player of the Year	(England) John Terry	Chelsea
PFA Young Player of the Year	(England) Wayne Rooney	Manchester United
PFA Fans' Player of the Year	(England) Frank Lampard	Chelsea
FWA Footballer of the Year	(England) Frank Lampard	Chelsea
Premier League Player of the Season	(England) Frank Lampard	Chelsea
Premier League Golden Boot	(France) Thierry Henry	Arsenal
Premier League Golden Glove	(Czech Republic) Petr Čech	Chelsea
Premier League Manager of the Season	(Portugal) José Mourinho	Chelsea

PFA Team of the Year
Goalkeeper	(Czech Republic) Petr Čech (Chelsea)			
Defenders	(England) Gary Neville (Manchester United)	(England) John Terry (Chelsea)	(England) Rio Ferdinand (Manchester United)	(England) Ashley Cole (Arsenal)
Midfielders	(England) Shaun Wright-Phillips (Manchester City)	(England) Frank Lampard (Chelsea)	(England) Steven Gerrard (Liverpool)	(Netherlands) Arjen Robben (Chelsea)
Forwards	(France) Thierry Henry (Arsenal)		(England) Andy Johnson (Crystal Palace)	

== Attendances ==
No.	Club	Matches	Total attendance	Average
1	Manchester United	19	1,289,541	67,871
2	Newcastle United	19	985,040	51,844
3	Manchester City	19	858,655	45,192
4	Liverpool FC	19	809,148	42,587
5	Chelsea FC	19	795,534	41,870
6	Arsenal FC	19	721,602	37,979
7	Aston Villa	19	709,730	37,354
8	Everton FC	19	699,846	36,834
9	Tottenham Hotspur	19	679,980	35,788
10	Middlesbrough FC	19	608,236	32,012
11	Southampton FC	19	581,583	30,610
12	Birmingham City	19	546,434	28,760
13	Charlton Athletic	19	507,770	26,725
14	West Bromwich Albion	19	493,746	25,987
15	Bolton Wanderers	19	492,308	25,911
16	Norwich City	19	462,653	24,350
17	Crystal Palace	19	458,051	24,108
18	Blackburn Rovers	19	423,985	22,315
19	Portsmouth FC	19	381,370	20,072
20	Fulham FC	19	376,928	19,838

== See also ==
- 2004–05 in English football
