= 2003–04 Football League First Division =

Football League First Division
- Season: 2003–04
- Champions: Norwich City
- Promoted: Norwich City; West Bromwich Albion; Crystal Palace
- Relegated: Bradford City; Walsall; Wimbledon
- UEFA Cup: Millwall (as FA Cup runners-up)
- Matches: 552

The 2003–04 Football League First Division (referred to as the Nationwide First Division for sponsorship reasons) was the twelfth and final season of the league under the First Division name, and the twelfth season under its current league division format.

== Changes from last season ==
=== From First Division ===
Promoted to Premier League

- Portsmouth
- Leicester City
- Wolverhampton Wanderers

Relegated to Second Division

- Brighton & Hove Albion
- Grimsby Town
- Sheffield Wednesday

=== To First Division ===
Promoted from Second Division

- Wigan Athletic
- Crewe Alexandra
- Cardiff City

Relegated from Premier League

- Sunderland
- West Bromwich Albion
- West Ham United

== Team overview ==
=== Stadia and locations ===
Locations of teams in the 2003–04 Football League First Division

Team	Location	Stadium	Capacity
Bradford City	Bradford	Valley Parade	25,136
Burnley	Burnley	Turf Moor	22,546
Cardiff City	Cardiff	Ninian Park	21,508
Coventry City	Coventry	Highfield Road	23,489
Crewe Alexandra	Crewe	Alexandra Stadium	10,153
Crystal Palace	London	Selhurst Park	26,309
Derby County	Derby	Pride Park Stadium	33,597
Gillingham	Gillingham	Priestfield Stadium	11,582
Ipswich Town	Ipswich	Portman Road	30,311
Millwall	London	The Den	20,146
Nottingham Forest	Nottingham	City Ground	30,576
Norwich City	Norwich	Carrow Road	26,018
Preston North End	Preston	Deepdale	23,408
Reading	Reading	Madjeski Stadium	24,161
Rotherham United	Rotherham	Millmoor	8,300
Sheffield United	Sheffield	Bramall Lane	32,702
Stoke City	Stoke	Britannia Stadium	27,740
Sunderland	Sunderland	Stadium of Light	49,000
Walsall	Walsall	Bescot Stadium	11,300
Watford	Watford	Vicarage Road	17,504
West Bromwich Albion	West Bromwich	The Hawthorns	26,484
West Ham United	London	Boleyn Ground	35,303
Wigan Athletic	Wigan	JJB Stadium	25,133
Wimbledon	Milton Keynes	National Hockey Stadium	9,000

== League table ==
Pos	Team	Pld	W	D	L	GF	GA	GD	Pts	Promotion, qualification or relegation
1	Norwich City (C, P)	46	28	10	8	79	39	+40	94	Promotion to the FA Premier League
2	West Bromwich Albion (P)	46	25	11	10	64	42	+22	86	Promotion to the FA Premier League
3	Sunderland	46	22	13	11	62	45	+17	79	Qualification for the First Division play-offs
4	West Ham United	46	19	17	10	67	45	+22	74	Qualification for the First Division play-offs
5	Ipswich Town	46	21	10	15	84	72	+12	73	Qualification for the First Division play-offs
6	Crystal Palace (O, P)	46	21	10	15	72	61	+11	73	Qualification for the First Division play-offs
7	Wigan Athletic	46	18	17	11	60	45	+15	71	
8	Sheffield United	46	20	11	15	65	56	+9	71	
9	Reading	46	20	10	16	55	57	−2	70	
10	Millwall	46	18	15	13	55	48	+7	69	Qualification for the UEFA Cup first round (Note: Since the FA Cup winners Manchester United qualified for the Champions League, their place in the UEFA Cup went to Millwall, who were the FA Cup runners-up.)
11	Stoke City	46	18	12	16	58	55	+3	66	
12	Coventry City	46	17	14	15	67	54	+13	65	
13	Cardiff City	46	17	14	15	68	58	+10	65	
14	Nottingham Forest	46	15	15	16	61	58	+3	60	
15	Preston North End	46	15	14	17	69	71	−2	59	
16	Watford	46	15	12	19	54	68	−14	57	
17	Rotherham United	46	13	15	18	53	61	−8	54	
18	Crewe Alexandra	46	14	11	21	57	66	−9	53	
19	Burnley	46	13	14	19	60	77	−17	53	
20	Derby County	46	13	13	20	53	67	−14	52	
21	Gillingham	46	14	9	23	48	67	−19	51	
22	Walsall (R)	46	13	12	21	45	65	−20	51	Relegation to Football League One
23	Bradford City (R)	46	10	6	30	38	69	−31	36	Relegation to Football League One
24	Wimbledon (R)	46	8	5	33	41	89	−48	29	Renamed Milton Keynes Dons in Football League One

Source: Soccerway
Rules for classification: 1) points; 2) goal difference; 3) number of goals scored.
(C) Champions; (O) Play-off winners; (P) Promoted; (R) Relegated

=== Semi-finals ===
==== First leg ====
2004-05-14
19:45 BST

Crystal Palace	3 – 2	Sunderland
Shipperley 52'; Butterfield 64'; Johnson 87'	Statistics	Stewart 51' (pen.); Kyle 85'

Selhurst Park, London
Attendance: 25,287
Referee: Richard Beeby

2004-05-15
12:15 BST

Ipswich Town	1 – 0	West Ham United
Bent 57'	Statistics

Portman Road, Ipswich
Attendance: 28,435
Referee: Mark Clattenburg

==== Second leg ====
2004-05-17
20:00 BST

Sunderland	2 – 1 (a.e.t.) (4 - 5p)	Crystal Palace
Kyle 42'; Stewart 45'	Statistics	Powell 90'

Stadium of Light, Sunderland
Attendance: 34,536
Referee: David Pugh
- Aggregate score 4-4. Crystal Palace win 5–4 on penalties.

2004-05-18
19:45 BST

West Ham United	2 – 0	Ipswich Town
Etherington 50'; Dailly 71'	Statistics

Boleyn Ground, London
Attendance: 34,002
Referee: Neale Barry
- West Ham United win 2–1 on aggregate.

=== Final ===
2004-05-29
15:00 BST

Crystal Palace	1 – 0	West Ham United
Shipperley 62'	Statistics

Millennium Stadium, Cardiff
Attendance: 72,523
Referee: Graham Poll

== Attendances ==
#	Club	Average
1	West Ham United	31,167
2	Sunderland	27,119
3	West Bromwich Albion	24,765
4	Nottingham Forest	24,751
5	Ipswich Town	24,520
6	Derby County	22,200
7	Sheffield United	21,646
8	Norwich City	18,987
9	Crystal Palace	17,344
10	Cardiff City	15,569
11	Reading	15,095
12	Watford	14,856
13	Coventry City	14,816
14	Stoke City	14,425
15	Preston North End	14,150
16	Burnley	12,541
17	Bradford City	11,377
18	Millwall	10,497
19	Wigan Athletic	9,531
20	Gillingham	8,517
21	Walsall	7,853
22	Crewe Alexandra	7,741
23	Rotherham United	7,138
24	Wimbledon	4,751
