= Bobby Zamora =

English footballer (born 1981)

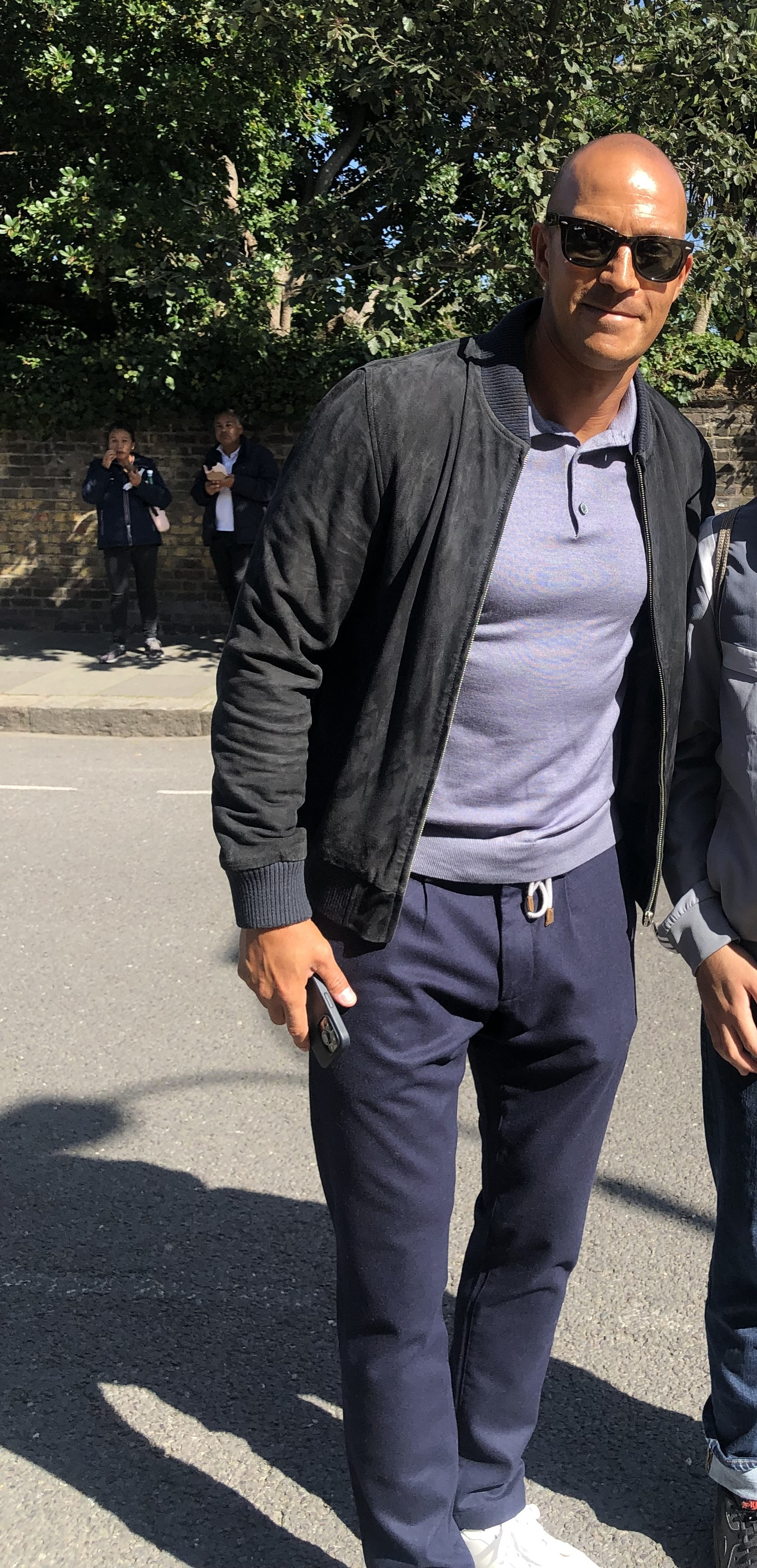
- Zamora in 2024

Personal information
- Full name: Robert Lester Zamora
- Date of birth: 16 January 1981 (age 45)
- Place of birth: Barking, England
- Height: 6 ft 0 in (1.83 m)
- Position: Forward

Youth career
- Senrab
- West Ham United
- Norwich City
- Bristol Rovers

Senior career*
Years	Team	Apps	(Gls)
1999–2000	Bristol Rovers	4	(0)
2000	→ Bath City (loan)	5	(7)
2000	→ Brighton & Hove Albion (loan)	6	(6)
2000–2003	Brighton & Hove Albion	119	(70)
2003–2004	Tottenham Hotspur	16	(0)
2004–2008	West Ham United	130	(30)
2008–2012	Fulham	91	(20)
2012–2015	Queens Park Rangers	83	(12)
2015–2016	Brighton & Hove Albion	26	(7)
Total		480	(152)

International career
2002–2003	England U21	6	(0)
2010–2011	England	2	(0)
- * Club domestic league appearances and goals

Robert Lester Zamora (born 16 January 1981) is a former English professional footballer who played as a forward. Zamora began his professional career at Football League club Bristol Rovers, and was signed by Brighton & Hove Albion, where he scored 77 goals in three seasons and helped the club achieve two successive promotions.

Following a spell at Tottenham Hotspur, Zamora was signed by West Ham United, where he played for five years and won promotion to the Premier League. Zamora joined Fulham in 2008, where, in his first season, he played regularly but scored only four goals. However, Zamora's form in the 2009–10 season gained praise and subsequently saw the player gain a call-up for England. Zamora had an important role in Fulham's successes in the Premier League, FA Cup and UEFA Europa League, before transferring to Queens Park Rangers in January 2012. He returned to play for Brighton in 2015 and retired from football in December 2016.

Zamora also played for the England national under-21 team before gaining his first full cap at senior level almost a decade later.

== Background ==
Born in Barking, London, Zamora attended Essex Junior School (in Manor Park) followed by Little Ilford School before moving onto Barking Abbey Secondary School. As a boy, he played for Senrab in east London, alongside John Terry, Ledley King, Paul Konchesky and Jlloyd Samuel. A West Ham United fan, he started his footballing career as an apprentice at the club's Academy of Football but was released from the east London club on the same year group as Samuel, Fitz Hall and Konchesky. Zamora then joined the youth build-up at Norwich City, but was again released at age 16.

== Club career ==
=== Bristol Rovers ===
Zamora joined Bristol Rovers as a trainee in August 1999, making a total of six substitute appearances for Bristol Rovers in all competitions, before joining Bath City on a one-month loan in early 2000, where he scored 11 goals in eight appearances, and then Brighton & Hove Albion on loan in February 2000.

=== Brighton & Hove Albion ===
Zamora joined Brighton in February 2000 on a three-month loan until the end of the 1999–2000 season, scoring six goals in six appearances. In August 2000, he made a permanent move to Brighton for a £100,000 fee. During his tenure he quickly established himself as a prolific goalscorer, breaking into the England national under-21 team and attracting interest from several higher-division clubs. He scored 83 times for the club in 136 appearances, helping Brighton win two successive championships as the team won promotion into what became the Championship. The Brighton fans had a chant they used to sing in his honour, to the tune of Dean Martin's "That's Amore": "When the ball hits the goal it's not Shearer or Cole, it's Zamora."

=== Tottenham Hotspur ===
Having been watched for much of the previous two seasons by the then manager Glenn Hoddle, Zamora moved to Tottenham Hotspur for a £1.5 million fee in July 2003. However, he struggled to gain a consistent first-team place at White Hart Lane, making only 18 cup and league appearances, 11 as substitute, and scoring a single goal, knocking West Ham United out of the League Cup in October 2003.

=== West Ham United ===
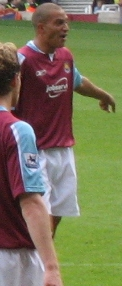
Zamora playing for West Ham United in 2006

In January 2004, Zamora joined West Ham in a deal which saw Jermain Defoe go the other way to Tottenham Hotspur. He scored on his debut as West Ham came from behind to beat Bradford City and also on his home debut, when he scored the winning goal against Cardiff City.

In the 2004–05 season, Zamora scored 13 goals, including one in the first leg and two in the second leg of the Championship play-off semi-final against Ipswich Town and the only goal in West Ham's 1–0 victory over Preston North End in the 2005 Championship play-off final, sending West Ham into the Premier League. In the 2005–06 season, he made 42 league and cup appearances and scored ten goals as West Ham finished in the top half of the Premier League and reached the FA Cup final, for which he received an FA Cup runners-up medal, missing a penalty in the shootout against Liverpool. He was rewarded for his contribution to the team with a new four-year contract in January 2006, and extended it to 2011 in October 2006, saying, "I'm delighted to have extended my contract and I'm now looking forward to spending my long-term future at Upton Park. I've been here for almost three years now, and there is really no other place I would rather be. This is my club and wearing a claret and blue shirt is all I have ever wanted to do."

He started the 2006–07 with five of West Ham's six goals in the first four matches of the season but, as West Ham then struggled in the relegation places, he did not score again until January 2007. However, he ended the season with 11 goals, including a controversial goal against Blackburn Rovers in March 2007 and being the first player to score a winning goal against Arsenal at the Emirates Stadium in April 2007, as West Ham pulled off an unexpected escape from relegation. He made only 14 appearances for West Ham in the 2007–08 season after missing five months of the season with tendinitis suffered in August 2007 but scored against Derby in West Ham's 2–1 win. By the end of the 2007–08 season, Zamora had made 152 appearances in all competitions for West Ham, scoring 40 goals.

=== Fulham ===
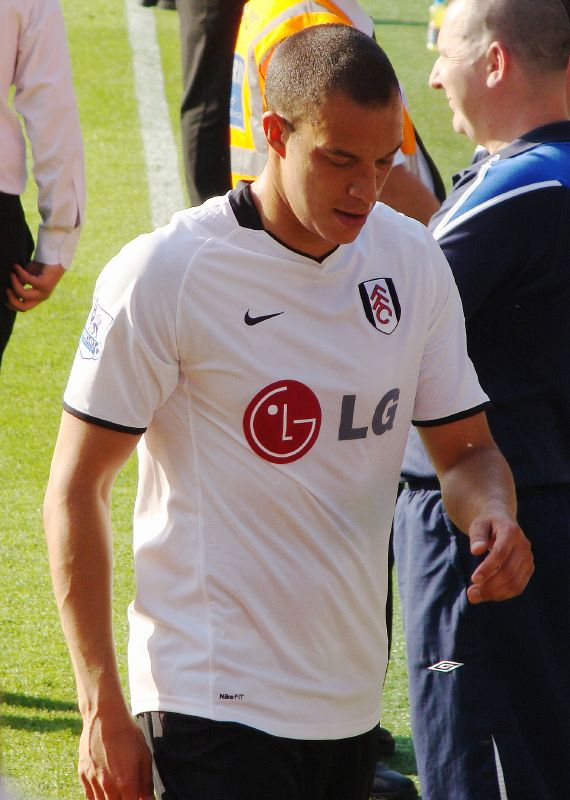
Zamora playing for Fulham in 2009.

In July 2008, Zamora and teammate John Paintsil were signed by Fulham for a joint total of £6.3 million, Zamora accounting for £4.8 million of the fee. In his first season with Fulham, Zamora scored twice in 35 league appearances over the 2008–09 season. After the season had concluded, Fulham and Hull City agreed a fee on 15 July, which would have seen Zamora move to Hull for £5 million. Zamora turned down the move to stay with Fulham.

Shortly after he turned down Hull, he played in a friendly against Peterborough United and scored twice in a 3–3 draw. Four days later he made his UEFA Europa League debut, against FK Vėtra of Lithuania, scoring once and setting up two goals to give Fulham a 3–0 away advantage going into the second leg. He opened his 2009–10 Premier League account on the opening day of the season when a Clint Dempsey shot hit him on the back and beat David James in the Portsmouth goal. He scored his second goal of the season against Hull on 19 October 2009 by heading in a rebound in the 43rd minute as Fulham won 2–0. By scoring the lone goal against Sunderland on 6 December 2009, Zamora doubled his output from the previous season with his fourth goal of the campaign. In celebrating his winning goal, Zamora held a finger against his lips in response to the Fulham fans who had previously jeered him.

On 17 December 2009, with Fulham needing a win to progress from Group E in the UEFA Europa League, Zamora scored twice against Basel in a 3–2 victory at St. Jakob-Park. Two days later, Zamora scored once again in a 3–0 win against Manchester United at Craven Cottage prompting talk of a call-up to the England squad. On 5 January 2010, he dislocated his shoulder at the Britannia Stadium during Fulham's 3–2 loss to Stoke City.

Zamora struck the winner in Fulham's UEFA Europa League Round of 32 first leg match against Shakhtar Donetsk, his strike from outside the box earning the Premier League side a 2–1 win. Zamora scored again on 22 February 2010 when netting a last minute free-kick against Birmingham City as Fulham came from behind to win 2–1. Zamora also scored Fulham's first goal in a UEFA Europa League comeback against Juventus, Fulham winning 4–1 on the night and 5–4 on aggregate. Zamora was widely praised for the trouble he caused Juventus' veteran captain Fabio Cannavaro, who was sent off in the 27th minute, having suggested that the Italian was past his best prior to the match. He scored in both legs of a 3–1 aggregate win against reigning Bundesliga champions Wolfsburg as Fulham progressed to the UEFA Europa League semi-final. His goal during the second leg in Germany came after 22 seconds. Fulham went on to reach the final of the UEFA Europa League but, with Zamora's fitness in real doubt, they were beaten 2–1 by Atlético Madrid of Spain.

On 10 September 2010, Zamora signed a new four-year contract with Fulham, which would have kept him at the London club until the summer of 2014. The day after, Zamora broke his leg during a match against Wolverhampton Wanderers following a challenge from Karl Henry that drew criticism. Zamora made his return from injury as a substitute in the FA-Cup encounter against Bolton Wanderers on 21 February 2011. He marked his Premier League return, again as a substitute, with a match-deciding goal from the penalty spot against Blackburn Rovers on 5 March 2011.

=== Queens Park Rangers ===
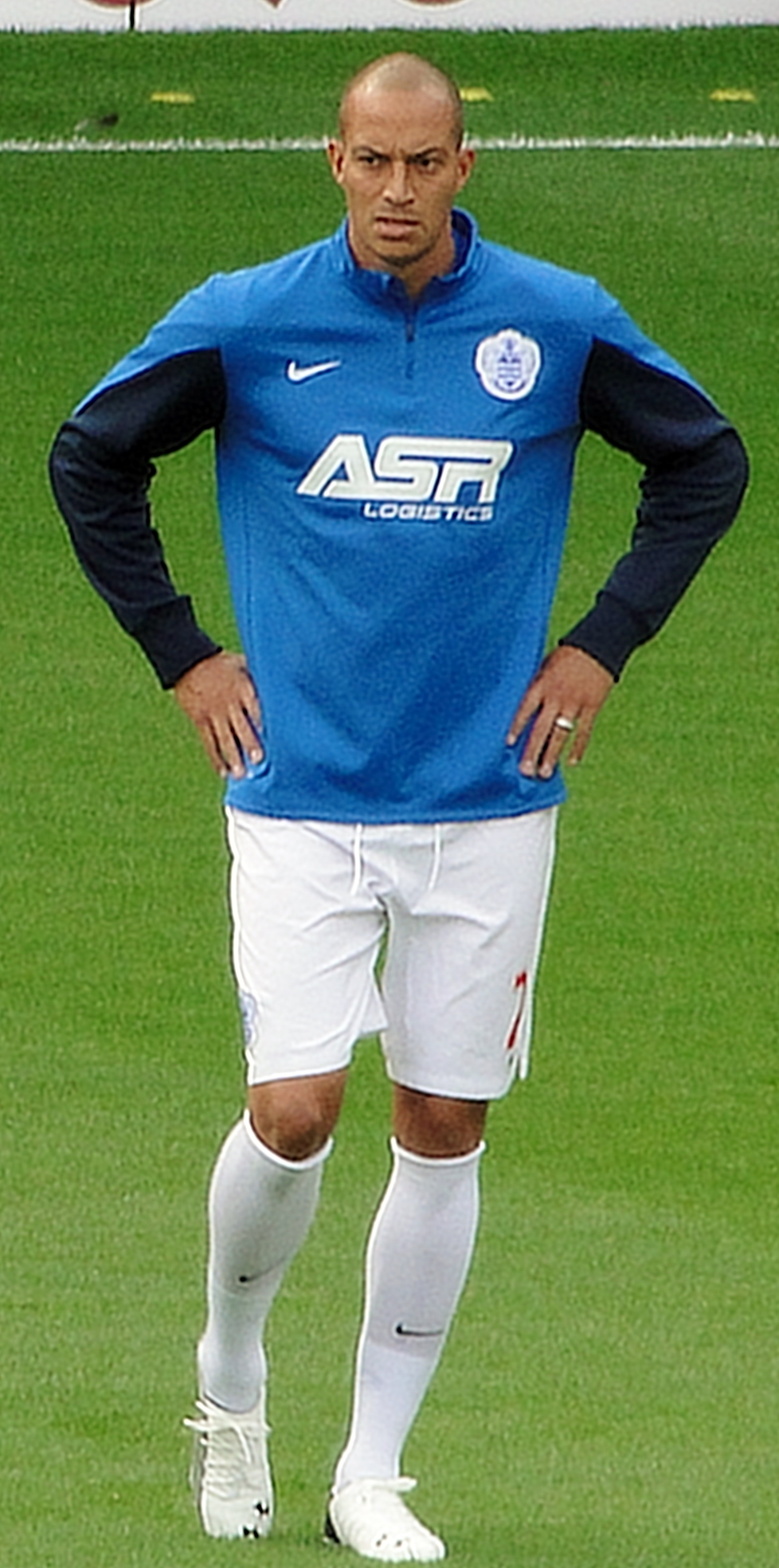
Zamora training with Queens Park Rangers in 2014.

On 31 January 2012, Zamora joined Fulham's west London Premier League rivals Queens Park Rangers on a two-and-a-half-year contract for a fee believed to be around £4 million. He scored on his debut on 4 February in a 2–1 defeat to Wolverhampton Wanderers. On 21 November 2012, it was announced Zamora would be out injured for three months due to requiring surgery on a hip injury. Zamora was a member of the Queens Park Rangers side which won the 2014 Championship play-off final 1–0 against Derby County on 24 May 2014 at Wembley Stadium. He scored the only goal of the match in the 90th minute to return QPR to the Premier League after a one-season absence. In May 2015, Queens Park Rangers announced the release of Zamora.

=== Return to Brighton & Hove Albion ===
On 3 August 2015, Zamora joined former club Brighton on a one-year deal on a free transfer. He claimed that he turned down an approach by a team competing in the UEFA Champions League to return to Brighton. His first goal on return to Brighton was an 89th-minute winner against Leeds United on 17 October 2015, coming 4,549 days after his last goal for the club in a 2–2 draw at Grimsby on 4 May 2003. Zamora was released by Brighton when his contract expired at the end of 2015–16.

== International career ==
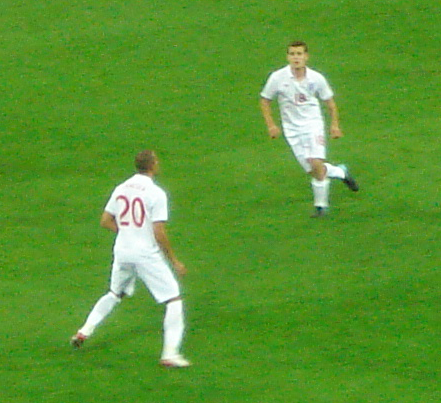
Zamora (left) making his England debut in 2010

Zamora was called up for the England Under-21 squad for a friendly with Portugal in April 2002. Zamora was named in the England Under-21 squad for the 2002 UEFA European Under-21 Championship with David Platt, the then England under-21 team manager, saying of him, "My mistake was not going to have a look at him earlier than I did. He's been in one squad, did very well in training and came on for 25 minutes and did great. If I need a goal and look at my bench and see a player who has scored 30 for the past two seasons, there is a chance he could come on. He warrants his place. [...]" Zamora was capped six times for the England Under-21 team.

Zamora was watched by the Trinidad and Tobago coach, Leo Beenhakker, who also spoke to his club manager at the time Alan Pardew. However, Zamora turned down the chance of playing in the 2006 FIFA World Cup with Trinidad and Tobago, saying in August 2005, "Trinidad is my dad's country and to play in the finals would be a dream but West Ham are more important. I am only thinking about the club at the moment and do not want to be distracted from that."

On 7 August 2009, it was revealed that Zamora and Jlloyd Samuel had received their Trinidadian passports, and would play for the Soca Warriors in their 2010 FIFA World Cup qualifier against El Salvador on 12 August. However, Zamora did not get his first cap due to an injury he picked up while training. His form in the 2009–10 season led to calls for Zamora to be called up to the England squad, and there had been rumours that Fabio Capello had been visiting Craven Cottage to look at his performances. However, due to an Achilles injury, he was not included in Fabio Capello's provisional squad of 30 players for the run-up to the 2010 FIFA World Cup, which was announced on 11 May 2010.

On 7 August 2010, Zamora was one of five uncapped players named in the England squad for their friendly on 11 August against Hungary alongside Jack Wilshere, Kieran Gibbs, Michael Dawson, and Gary Cahill. On 11 August 2010, Zamora won his first England cap in a friendly, coming on as a half time substitute against Hungary in a 2–1 win at Wembley Stadium.

On 23 May 2011, Zamora was selected for the England squad to face Switzerland in the UEFA Euro 2012 qualifier on 4 June at Wembley Stadium. On 15 November 2011, Zamora made his full England debut by starting in the 1–0 friendly victory over Sweden at Wembley Stadium.

== Coaching career ==
In October 2024, Zamora returned to Brighton as part of the coaching team of manager Fabian Hürzeler, taking a role coaching strikers.

== Personal life ==
Zamora has three daughters. He retired from football in December 2016. He had not played since March 2016 and had been struggling with a hip injury for which he had undergone an operation. His interests outside football include involvement in a social housing scheme with Rio Ferdinand and Mark Noble.

Zamora appeared on The Grand Fishing Adventure in 2022 with Ali Hamidi, a four-episode series where the two visited some of Britain's best fishing locations.

== Career statistics ==
=== Club ===
Appearances and goals by club, season and competition
Club	Season	League			FA Cup		League Cup		Other		Total	
Club	Season	Division	Apps	Goals	Apps	Goals	Apps	Goals	Apps	Goals	Apps	Goals
Bristol Rovers	1999–2000	Second Division	4	0	1	0	1	0	0	0	6	0
Bath City (loan)	1999–2000	Southern Football League; Premier Division	5	7	—		—		1 (Note: Appearance in Southern League Cup)	1	6	8
Brighton & Hove Albion (loan)	1999–2000	Third Division	6	6	—		—		—		6	6
Brighton & Hove Albion	2000–01	Third Division	43	28	2	2	2	0	1 (Note: Appearance in Football League Trophy)	1	48	31
Brighton & Hove Albion	2001–02	Second Division	41	28	3	2	2	2	0	0	46	32
Brighton & Hove Albion	2002–03	First Division	35	14	1	0	0	0	—		36	14
Brighton & Hove Albion	Total		125	76	6	4	4	2	1	1	136	83
Tottenham Hotspur	2003–04	Premier League	16	0	1	0	1	1	—		18	1
West Ham United	2003–04	First Division	17	5	—		—		3 (Note: Appearances in First Division play-offs)	0	20	5
West Ham United	2004–05	Championship	34	7	0	0	2	2	3 (Note: Appearances in Championship play-offs)	4	39	13
West Ham United	2005–06	Premier League	34	6	7	2	1	2	—		42	10
West Ham United	2006–07	Premier League	32	11	2	0	1	0	2 (Note: Appearances in UEFA Cup)	0	37	11
West Ham United	2007–08	Premier League	13	1	0	0	1	0	—		14	1
West Ham United	Total		130	30	9	2	5	4	8	4	152	40
Fulham	2008–09	Premier League	35	2	5	2	1	0	—		41	4
Fulham	2009–10	Premier League	27	8	4	3	0	0	17 (Note: Appearances in UEFA Europa League)	8	48	19
Fulham	2010–11	Premier League	14	5	1	0	1	2	—		16	7
Fulham	2011–12	Premier League	15	5	2	0	1	0	11	2	26	7
Fulham	Total		91	20	12	5	3	2	28	10	134	37
Queens Park Rangers	2011–12	Premier League	14	2	—		—		—		14	2
Queens Park Rangers	2012–13	Premier League	21	4	1	0	2	1	—		24	5
Queens Park Rangers	2013–14	Championship	17	3	0	0	2	0	2	1	21	4
Queens Park Rangers	2014–15	Premier League	31	3	1	0	1	0	—		33	3
Queens Park Rangers	Total		83	12	2	0	5	1	2	1	92	14
Brighton & Hove Albion	2015–16	Championship	26	7	0	0	0	0	0	0	26	7
Career total			480	152	31	11	19	10	40	17	570	190

=== International ===
Appearances and goals by national team and year
National team	Year	Apps	Goals
England	2010	1	0
England	2011	1	0
Total		2	0

== Honours ==
Brighton & Hove Albion

- Football League Third Division: 2000–01
- Football League Second Division: 2001–02

West Ham United

- Football League Championship play-offs: 2005
- FA Cup runner-up: 2005–06

Fulham

- UEFA Europa League runner-up: 2009–10

Queens Park Rangers

- Football League Championship play-offs: 2014

Individual

- PFA Fans' Player of the Year: 2000–01 Third Division, 2001–02 Second Division
- PFA Team of the Year: 2000–01 Third Division, 2001–02 Second Division
- Football League Third Division Top scorer: 2000–01
- Football League Second Division Top scorer: 2001–02
