= Danny Granville =

English footballer (born 1975)

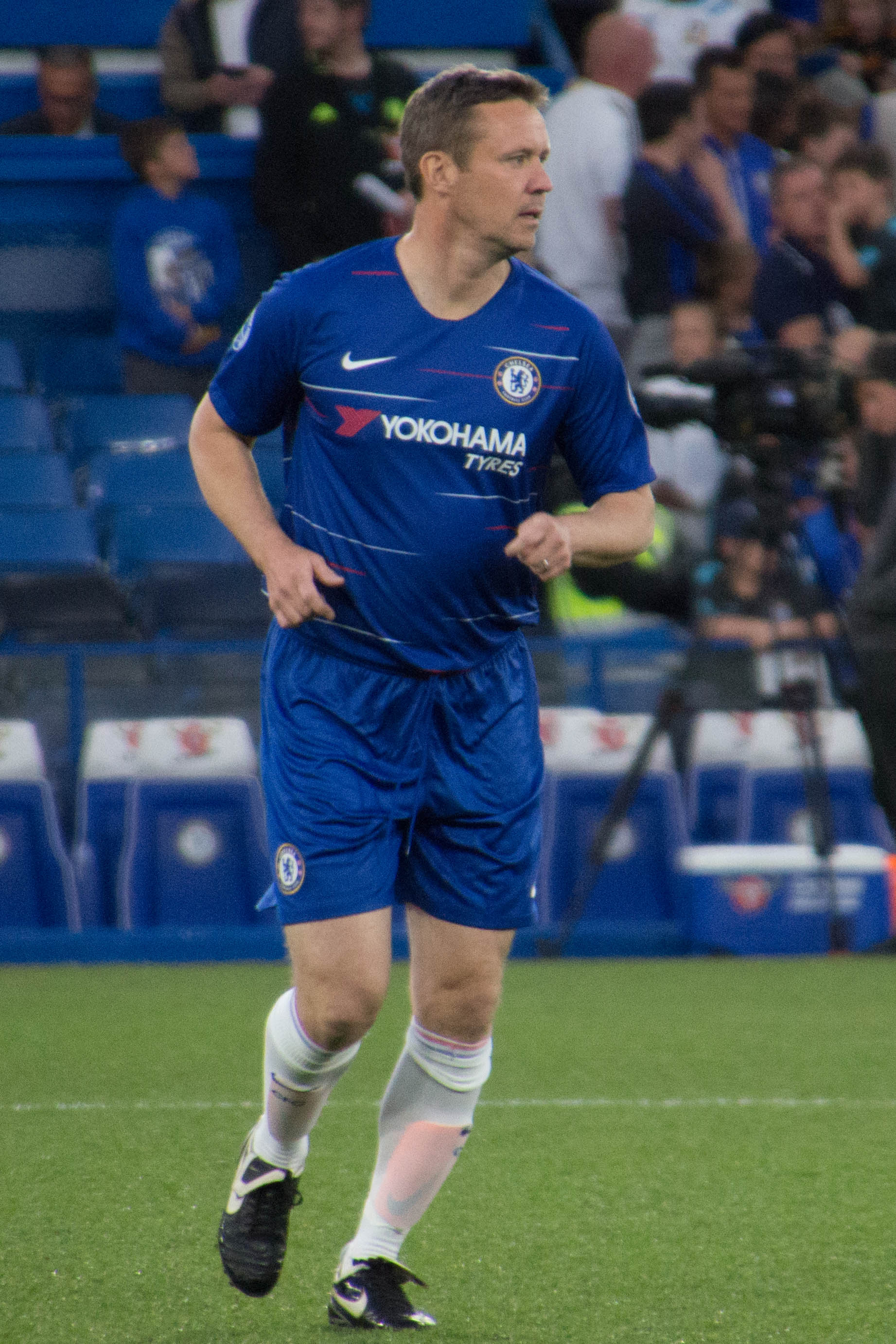
- Granville playing in a Chelsea legends game.

Personal information
- Full name: Danny Patrick Granville
- Date of birth: 19 January 1975 (age 51)
- Place of birth: Islington, London, England
- Height: 6 ft 0 in (1.83 m)
- Position: Defender

Team information
- Current team: Arsenal (academy coach)

Youth career
- 1993–1996: Cambridge United

Senior career*
Years	Team	Apps	(Gls)
1993–1997	Cambridge United	99	(7)
1997–1998	Chelsea	18	(0)
1998–1999	Leeds United	9	(0)
1999	→ Manchester City (loan)	11	(1)
1999–2001	Manchester City	59	(2)
2001	→ Norwich City (loan)	6	(0)
2001–2007	Crystal Palace	122	(9)
2007–2008	Colchester United	19	(0)
2008–2009	Leyton Orient	12	(0)
2009–2013	Hemel Hempstead	42	(3)
Total		397	(22)

International career
1997	England U21	4	(0)
- * Club domestic league appearances and goals

Daniel Patrick Granville (born 19 January 1975) is an English football coach and former footballer, who is an academy coach for Premier League side Arsenal.

As a player he was a left back who played in the Premier League for Chelsea, Leeds United, Manchester City and Crystal Palace. He also played in the Football League for Cambridge United, Norwich City, Colchester United and Leyton Orient before retiring with non-league side Hemel Hempstead Town. He was capped four times by England U21. Since retiring he has coached football in schools as a PE Teacher and has worked with Arsenal as an academy coach.

== Club career ==
=== Cambridge United ===
Granville began his career with Cambridge United, playing 99 games and attracting a number of top clubs.

=== Chelsea ===
Granville moved to Chelsea in 1997 for a fee of £300,000, but lost his place in the Chelsea side when Graeme Le Saux was re-signed from Blackburn Rovers. Arguably the highlight of his career occurred during his time at Chelsea, playing in the winning side in the 1998 UEFA Cup Winners' Cup triumph over VfB Stuttgart. It was earlier in that campaign that Granville scored his only Chelsea goal, against Slovan Bratislava.

=== Leeds United ===
He was signed by Leeds United in the summer of 1998 for £1,600,000. He made his debut when coming on as a substitute in a UEFA Cup tie against Marítimo, and then went onto score his penalty in the shootout as Leeds eventually won the tie. However Granville made only 14 appearances for Leeds in all competitions, and was sent off on his first start against Nottingham Forest.

=== Manchester City ===
Following a successful loan spell at Manchester City in November 1999 Granville moved again, joining City permanently for £1,000,000. He helped the club gain promotion to the Premier League, another highlight of his career. Towards the end of time at Manchester City, he was pushed onto the bench and spent a month on loan at Norwich City, a successful spell after which Norwich asked for his signature. He opted to return to City to help the club retain their Premier League status.

=== Crystal Palace ===
In December 2001 Granville signed for Crystal Palace and played regularly in the first team. Danny was an integral part of the play-off-winning team of 2003–04, scoring three goals and recording many assists. Granville made 138 appearances for Crystal Palace.

=== Later career ===
Granville signed with Colchester United at the start of the 2007–08 season and was given the number 2 shirt. He was released by the club at the end of the season.

After being released from Colchester, Granville signed for Leyton Orient on 4 June 2008. His stay lasted less than a year as, after only 15 first team appearances and one goal (against Bradford in the FA Cup) he was released by Orient manager Geraint Williams on 4 May 2009. Williams had also been the manager at Colchester when the Essex club released Granville the previous year.

Granville signed for Hemel Hempstead Town in October 2009 after being released by Leyton Orient.

== International career ==
Granville represented England at under-21 level.

== Coaching career ==
After retiring as a player, Granville worked as a coach with Arsenal's academy and coached in school football.

== Personal life ==
Granville works as a Games Teacher at Duncombe School in Hertfordshire. Granville's son Sam played professionally for Barnet.

== Honours ==
Chelsea

- UEFA Cup Winners' Cup: 1997–98

Manchester City

- Football League First Division: 2001–02

Crystal Palace

- Football League First Division play-offs: 2004
