= Neil Shipperley =

English footballer (born 1974)

Personal information
- Full name: Neil Jason Shipperley
- Date of birth: 30 October 1974 (age 51)
- Place of birth: Chatham, England
- Position: Striker

Youth career
- Chelsea

Senior career*
Years	Team	Apps	(Gls)
1992–1995	Chelsea	37	(7)
1994	→ Watford (loan)	6	(1)
1995–1996	Southampton	66	(12)
1996–1998	Crystal Palace	61	(20)
1998–1999	Nottingham Forest	20	(1)
1999–2001	Barnsley	78	(27)
2001–2003	Wimbledon	87	(32)
2003–2005	Crystal Palace	41	(8)
2005–2007	Sheffield United	39	(11)
2007	Brentford	11	(0)
2013	North Greenford United	1	(0)
Total		446	(119)

International career
1993–1995	England U21	7	(3)

Managerial career
- 2009–2010: Bedfont
- 2010–2011: Walton Casuals
- 2011–2012: North Greenford United
- 2012–2014: North Greenford United
- * Club domestic league appearances and goals

Neil Jason Shipperley (born 30 October 1974) is an English football manager and former professional player who played as a forward.

He notably played in the Premier League for Chelsea, Southampton, Crystal Palace, Nottingham Forest and Sheffield United as well as featuring in the Football League for Watford, Barnsley, Wimbledon and Brentford. He scored the only goal of the 2004 Football League First Division play-off final for Crystal Palace. He was also capped seven times by the England U21 team, scoring three goals.

Following retirement he moved into management with non-league clubs Bedfont, Walton Casuals and North Greenford United.

== Playing career ==
=== Chelsea ===
Shipperley got his break in football at the age of 15, when playing for Spartan League side Brook House in the Middlesex Charity Cup. The tournament's patron, celebrity astrologer Russell Grant, was friends with Chelsea chairman Ken Bates, whose club sent a team to the tournament. Shipperley bettered Chelsea centre-back Frank Sinclair for strength and pace, and was scouted by the club. An article in The Independent in January 1994 predicted that Shipperley could become Chelsea's first homegrown star striker since Peter Osgood in the 1960s.

In the inaugural Premier League season of 1992–93, Shipperley made his professional debut towards the end of the campaign. On 10 April, he came on as a 65th-minute substitute for Robert Fleck in a 1–0 loss at his future club Southampton, and two days later on his first start and first game at Stamford Bridge he scored their last goal in a 4–2 win against Wimbledon.

=== Southampton and Crystal Palace ===
Shipperley was signed for Southampton by Alan Ball for a record fee of £1.25 million on 6 January 1995. New manager Graeme Souness signed Norwegian Egil Østenstad, prompting Shipperley to drop to the First Division by signing for Crystal Palace for a £1 million fee in October 1996. He scored 13 times for the Eagles over the rest of the season as they were promoted via the play-offs, including one on 10 May in a 3–1 home win over Wolverhampton Wanderers in the first leg of the semi-finals. In 1997–98, he scored seven times – including five consecutive games from October to December – in a season that ended with relegation.

=== Nottingham Forest and Barnsley ===
In September 1998, Shipperley returned to the Premier League by signing for Nottingham Forest for £1.5 million. He scored only once in 21 games as Forest went down, that coming on 13 March 1999 to round off a 3–1 win at his future club Wimbledon.

For 1999–2000, Shipperley signed for First Division club Barnsley for £700,000. He scored 15 times in 46 total games in his first season, including both of a 2–0 home win over South Yorkshire rivals Sheffield United on 6 November. On 13 May 2000, he opened the scoring in a 4–0 win at Birmingham City in the first leg of the play-off semi-finals, though his team would lose 4–2 to Ipswich Town in the final at Wembley.

=== Wimbledon and return to Palace ===
Ahead of the 2001–02 season, Shipperley joined Wimbledon for £750,000, and scored on his debut on 11 August to open a 3–1 win over Birmingham. He scored 12 times in his first season with the Dons, including braces in both games against Manchester City (4–0 away and 2–1 home wins). He captained the side, and built a prolific partnership with Irishman David Connolly in 2002–03, the club's final season.

In July 2003, Shipperley returned to Palace on a three-year deal. On 29 May 2004 at the Millennium Stadium, he captained the side and scored the only goal of a play-off final win against West Ham United to take the Eagles back to the Premier League.

=== Later career ===
After Palace's immediate relegation, Shipperley moved on to Sheffield United on a two-year deal on a free transfer in July 2005. He scored 11 times as the Blades won promotion as runners-up to Reading, including two on 10 December in a 3–0 home win over Burnley.

On 15 January 2007, his contract with Sheffield United was terminated by mutual consent, and he signed a four-month contract with Brentford, eight days later. He failed to score in his eleven appearances for Brentford, and on 25 April 2007 announced his retirement from professional football. In June that year, he rejected the chance to play for Wimbledon's successor AFC Wimbledon, telling the Surrey Comet that he was in the Middle East to coach a club there.

== Managerial career ==
On 20 May 2009, it was announced that Shipperley had become manager of Bedfont in the Combined Counties League. In the summer of 2010, Shipperley was appointed manager of Walton Casuals in the Isthmian League Division One South. In October 2011, after 15 months in the role he re resigned from the role.

On Boxing Day 2011, Shipperley was confirmed as the successor to Steve Ringrose at North Greenford United a post he held until May 2012 when he resigned to look for management experience at a higher level, though he returned in October 2012 following the sacking of Jon-Barrie Bates. He made an appearance as a player against Leighton Town in the final game of the 2012–13 season.

Shipperley's second spell as manager at North Greenford United came to an end when he resigned in February 2014 following a 4–1 defeat to Dunstable Town.

== Personal life ==
Shipperley's father was Dave Shipperley, who played for many years at centre back for Charlton Athletic and Gillingham.

In December 2019, Shipperley was found guilty of public masturbation and intentionally exposing himself to a mother and her 16-year-old daughter. He was given a 12-month community order, ordered to complete 120 hours' unpaid work plus costs and compensation. He was also made subject to a five-year sexual offences notification requirement order. Shipperley had been receiving counselling for personal issues, including the death of his father and gambling addiction, as well as debts.

== Honours ==
Crystal Palace

- Football League First Division play-offs: 1997, 2004
