= Ehui =

Ehui is a surname. Notable people with the surname include:

- Georges Ehui (born 1994), Ivorian-born English football midfielder
- Ismael Ehui (born 1986), French footballer
