= 2008–09 Fulham F.C. season =

Fulham
2008–09 season
- Chairman: Mohamed al-Fayed
- Manager: Roy Hodgson
- Stadium: Craven Cottage
- Premier League: 7th
- FA Cup: Quarter-finals
- League Cup: Third round
- Top goalscorer: League: Andy Johnson and Clint Dempsey (7); All: Andy Johnson (10)
- Highest home attendance: 25,661 vs Liverpool (4 April 2009)
- Lowest home attendance: 7,584 vs Leicester City (27 August 2008)
Home colours	Away colours	Third colours

The 2008–09 Fulham season was the club's 111th professional season and their eighth consecutive season in the top flight of English football, the Premier League, since their return in 2001. They were managed by Roy Hodgson in his first full season as Fulham manager. They played in the Premier League by virtue of staying up on goal difference from Reading on the last day of the previous campaign and were hoping to improve on their placing of 17th. They eventually finished in seventh place in the Premier League table with 53 points, an improvement of ten places and 18 points. Their league position secured a place in the newly formed UEFA Europa League for the 2009–10 season as well as their highest League finish in their history. The club received a number of additional awards from the Premier League, namely the Fair Play Award, the Behaviour of the Public Award and the Barclays Spirit Award for manager Roy Hodgson.

Some of the most notable results of the season came against clubs who finished in the top four in the table. The club beat Manchester United and Arsenal at home and managed a draw at home against Chelsea and away against Liverpool. In other competitions, Fulham reached the quarter-finals of the FA Cup before losing to league champions Manchester United. In the Football League Cup, they defeated Leicester City in the second round but were knocked out by Burnley in the third round.

== Pre-season ==
Roy Hodgson added to the team in the summer with signings including goalkeeper Mark Schwarzer from Middlesbrough and strikers Bobby Zamora from West Ham United and Andy Johnson who arrived from Everton for a club record £10.5 million (though Steve Marlet had cost more when including agents fees in 2001). Club captain Brian McBride decided to return to United States, where he eventually signed with Major League Soccer's Chicago Fire. Olivier Dacourt joined Fulham during the winter transfer window.

Date	Opponents	H / A	Result F – A	Scorers	Attendance
15 July 2008	Southend United	A	2–0	Nevland 59', Murphy 61'	3,750
19 July 2008	Celtic	H	3–1	Nevland 2', Zamora 30', Andreasen 86' (Celtic: Barry Robson 41')	16,000
23 July 2008	Busan I'Park	A	0–1	(Busan I'Park: Choi Ki Suk 57')
26 July 2008	Ulsan Hyundai Horang-i	A	2–1	Davies 57', Gera 79' (Ulsan: Lee Jin Ho 32')
2 August 2008	Birmingham City	A	1–1	Davies 17' (Birmingham: Larsson 77')
9 August 2008	Torino	H	2–2	Zamora 22', Gera 28' (Torino: Abbruscato 82', Ogbonna 88')

Fulham also put out teams in away matches consisting of first and reserve team players against Walton Casuals (won 3–1), Staines Town (lost 2–0), Banstead (won 3–0)Goals coming in from Jordan Wilson, Joe Anderson and Enrico dos Santos continued the win streak for the whites, Carshalton (won 2–0), Crystal Palace (drew 0–0) and Kingstonian (won 8–0).

== Premier League ==
Fulham started the season playing away at the KC Stadium against newly promoted Hull City. Seol Ki-hyeon gave Fulham the lead in the eighth minute. Their lead lasted less than 15 minutes because Geovanni equalised in the 22nd minute. Caleb Folan completed the Hull turn-around ten minutes from the end of normal time, capping a 2–1 victory for the home team. However, the following week the team gained their first victory of the season with a win against much-fancied Arsenal for only the second time in 43 years. The only goal of the game came from Brede Hangeland midway through the first half who scored directly from a Jimmy Bullard cross, from a couple of yards. A slightly off-colour Arsenal played their usual passing game but could not break Fulham down.

The team did not have another Premier League game to play until 13 September due to Manchester United's participation in the UEFA Super Cup, as well as the break from league football at the beginning of September for international World Cup qualifying matches.

On 17 May 2009, the club confirmed their highest ever league finish with a 1–0 victory over relegation-threatened Newcastle United at St James' Park. The victory kept them in seventh place in the table, with eighth being the lowest they could finish, bettering the ninth-place finish in 2004. Kamara scored in the 41st minute of a tense game which was full of chances for both sides.

Date	Opponents	H / A	Result F – A	Scorers	Attendance
16 August 2008	Hull City	A	1–2	Ki-Hyeon 8' (Hull: Geovanni 22', Folan 81')	24,525
23 August 2008	Arsenal	H	1–0	Hangeland 10'	25,276
13 September 2008	Bolton Wanderers	H	2–1	Gera 15', Zamora 41' (Bolton: K. Davies 82')	23,656
20 September 2008	Blackburn Rovers	A	0–1	(Blackburn: Derbyshire 84')	19,398
27 September 2008	West Ham United	H	1–2	Murphy pen 59' (West Ham: C. Cole 43', Etherington 45'+1)	23,946
4 October 2008	West Bromwich Albion	A	0–1	(West Brom: Bednář 61')	25,708
18 October 2008	Sunderland	H	0–0		25,116
26 October 2008	Portsmouth	A	1–1	Dempsey 87' (Portsmouth: Crouch 61')	19,233
29 October 2008	Wigan Athletic	H	2–0	Johnson 11', 60'	22,500
1 November 2008	Everton	A	0–1	(Everton: Saha 87')	31,278
9 November 2008	Newcastle United	H	2–1	A. Johnson 23', Murphy pen 66' (Newcastle: Ameobi 57')	24,740
15 November 2008	Tottenham Hotspur	H	2–1	Davies 33', A. Johnson 70' (Tottenham: F. Campbell 81')	25,139
22 November 2008	Liverpool	A	0–0		43,589
29 November 2008	Aston Villa	A	0–0		36,625
6 December 2008	Manchester City	H	1–1	Bullard 27' (Manchester City: Benjani 6')	24,012
13 December 2008	Stoke City	A	0–0		25,287
20 December 2008	Middlesbrough	H	3–0	Bullard 41', Murphy pen 54', Dempsey 59'	23,722
26 December 2008	Tottenham Hotspur	A	0–0		35,869
28 December 2008	Chelsea	H	2–2	Dempsey 10', 89' (Chelsea: Lampard 50', 72')	25,462
18 January 2009	West Ham United	A	1–3	Konchesky 22' (West Ham: Di Michele 7', Noble pen 60', C. Cole 76')	31,838
27 January 2009	Sunderland	A	0–1	(Sunderland: K. Jones 55')	36,539
31 January 2009	Portsmouth	H	3–1	A. Johnson 14', Nevland 71', 80' (Portsmouth: Nugent 84')	23,722
7 February 2009	Wigan Athletic	A	0–0		16,499
18 February 2009	Manchester United	A	0–3	(Manchester United: Scholes 12', Berbatov 30', Rooney 63')	75,437
22 February 2009	West Bromwich Albion	H	2–0	Zamora 61', A. Johnson 72'	22,394
28 February 2009	Arsenal	A	0–0		60,102
4 March 2009	Hull City	H	0–1	(Hull: Manucho 90+3')	23,051
11 March 2009	Blackburn Rovers	H	1–2	Dempsey 2' (Blackburn: Diouf 69', Roberts 85')	22,259
14 March 2009	Bolton Wanderers	A	3–1	A. Johnson 42', S. Davies 56', Kamara 88' (Bolton: K. Davies 45')	22,117
21 March 2009	Manchester United	H	2–0	Murphy pen 18, Gera 87	25,652
4 April 2009	Liverpool	H	0–1	(Liverpool: Benayoun 90'+2)	25,661
12 April 2009	Manchester City	A	3–1	Dempsey 50', 83', Etuhu 59' (Man City: Ireland 27')	39,841
18 April 2009	Middlesbrough	A	0–0		30,389
25 April 2009	Stoke City	H	1–0	Nevland 29'	25,069
2 May 2009	Chelsea	A	1–3	Nevland 4' (Chelsea: Anelka 1', Malouda 10', Drogba 53')	41,801
9 May 2009	Aston Villa	H	3–1	Murphy pen 6', Kamara 46', 60' (Aston Villa: Young 14')	25,660
16 May 2009	Newcastle United	A	1–0	Kamara 41'	52,114
24 May 2009	Everton	H	0–2	(Everton: Osman 45', 88')	25,497

- Fulham's home match against Blackburn Rovers was postponed due to a waterlogged pitch on 10 January 2009. Their match away against Manchester United, due to be played in August, was rearranged due to United's involvement in the UEFA Super Cup.

=== Premier League table ===
Pos	Team	Pld	W	D	L	GF	GA	GD	Pts	Qualification or relegation
5	Everton	38	17	12	9	55	37	+18	63	Qualification for the Europa League play-off round (Note: Since both finalists of the FA Cup (Chelsea and Everton) and the League Cup winners (Manchester United) qualified for the European competitions based on their league position, the sixth-placed team (Aston Villa) received a berth in the Europa League play-off round and the seventh-placed team (Fulham) received a berth in the Europa League third qualifying round.)
6	Aston Villa	38	17	11	10	54	48	+6	62	Qualification for the Europa League play-off round
7	Fulham	38	14	11	13	39	34	+5	53	Qualification for the Europa League third qualifying round
8	Tottenham Hotspur	38	14	9	15	45	45	0	51	
9	West Ham United	38	14	9	15	42	45	−3	51	

Source: Barclays Premier League
Rules for classification: 1) points; 2) goal difference; 3) number of goals scored.
Notes:

Results summary

Overall								Home						Away					
Pld	W	D	L	GF	GA	GD	Pts	W	D	L	GF	GA	GD	W	D	L	GF	GA	GD
38	14	11	13	39	34	+5	53	11	3	5	28	16	+12	3	8	8	11	18	−7

Results by round

Round	1	2	3	4	5	6	7	8	9	10	11	12	13	14	15	16	17	18	19	20	21	22	23	24	25	26	27	28	29	30	31	32	33	34	35	36	37	38
Ground	A	H	H	A	H	A	H	A	H	A	H	H	A	A	H	A	H	A	H	A	A	H	A	A	H	A	H	H	A	H	H	A	A	H	A	H	A	H
Result	L	W	W	L	L	L	D	D	W	L	W	W	D	D	D	D	W	D	D	L	L	W	D	L	W	D	L	L	W	W	L	W	D	W	L	W	W	L
Position	13	12	7	12	13	16	17	18	17	18	14	11	10	9	11	10	8	10	9	13	16	14	12	13	11	12	14	14	9	9	9	8	8	7	9	7	7	7

Source: https://www.worldfootball.net/teams/te847/fulham-fc/all-matches/
A = Away; H = Home; W = Win; D = Draw; L = Loss

== FA Cup ==
The club entered the FA Cup in the third round, with an away match against Sheffield Wednesday at Hillsborough on 3 January 2009. Fulham took the lead through Andrew Johnson from a Danny Murphy through-ball in the 12th minute but were pegged back by a 25-yard goal from Tommy Spurr after 21 minutes. The game remained 1–1 until the 88th minute, when Andy Johnson scored his second of the game which turned out to be the winner.

Fulham next faced one of only two non-league sides left in the competition, Kettering Town. After a positive opening from the underdogs Kettering, Fulham took the lead in the 12th minute, Simon Davies scoring a volley from 15 yards from a Clint Dempsey cross. But the lead only lasted until the 36th minute as the lively Craig Westcarr scored a deflected freekick. Kettering continued to press after the break and with the additions of Danny Murphy and Bobby Zamora, they regained the lead in the 77th minute with Murphy scoring the goal. Kettering, however, were not finished and 9 minutes later, Westcarr scored a penalty after a trip from Brede Hangeland. With Kettering planning a trip to London, Andy Johnson and Zamora scored two late goals to seal the tie.

In the fifth round, Fulham were drawn away again to Championship side Swansea City at the Liberty Stadium. Roy Hodgson made three changes from Fulham's last Premier League match against Wigan, with Dempsey and Paintsil rested after playing abroad in midweek for their countries. to be replaced by Gera and Stoor while Zamora also dropped to the bench in favour of Nevland. Swansea created some clear-cut opportunities in the early stages, with Mark Gower, Alan Tate and Lloyd Dyer testing Mark Schwarzer. Fulham, however, found the breakthrough a minute before half-time with a slice of luck as Paul Konchesky's corner was deflected in off Swansea defender Garry Monk. Swansea continued to dominate and equalised in the 52nd minute when Jason Scotland scored, evading a challenge before firing the ball low past Schwarzer. With both sides playing attractive passing football the sides could not be separated.

Fulham and Swansea both went into the hat for the quarter-finals and were given the prospect of a tie with defending Premier League and Champions League champions Manchester United. They first had to get through the fifth round replay, which took place on 24 February 2009 at Craven Cottage. It was Fulham's second game in three days but Roy Hodgson put out a strong side with the only changes being Nevland replacing Johnson up front and Dacourt making his first start for the club in place of Danny Murphy. Jason Scotland scored just after half-time following an even first half, knocking the ball in from 15 yards. Fulham, however, did not give up, Zamora coming close on several occasions before they equalised through Dempsey in the 67th minute. Four minutes later, they turned the game around when Zamora scored his second goal in as many games. The home side held on to secure victory.

Date	Round	Opponents	H / A	Result F – A	Scorers	Attendance
3 January 2009	Third Round	Sheffield Wednesday	A	2–1	A. Johnson 12', 88' (Sheffield Wednesday: Spurr 21')	18,377
24 January 2009	Fourth Round	Kettering Town	A	4–2	Davies 12', Murphy 77', Johnson 88', Zamora 89' (Kettering: Craig Westcarr 36', 86' (pen))	5406
14 February 2009	Fifth Round	Swansea City	A	1–1	Monk 44' (o.g.) (Swansea: Scotland 52')	16,573
24 February 2009	Fifth Round replay	Swansea City	H	2–1	Dempsey 77', Zamora 81' (Swansea: Scotland 47')	12,316
7 March 2009	Quarter final	Manchester United	H	0–4	(Manchester United: Tevez 20', 35', Rooney 50', Park 81')	24,662

== Football League Cup ==
Fulham entered the Football League Cup at the second round stage after receiving the bye awarded to Premier League clubs in the first round. They faced a Leicester City side finding their feet in League One after relegation the previous season. Fulham took the lead in the 31st minute through one of their new signings, Hungarian international Zoltán Gera, but Leicester turned the game around in the early stages of the second half. Veteran Paul Dickov drew them level on 46 minutes and just two minutes later Andy King completed the turnaround. The match remained 2–1 until the 83rd minute when Jimmy Bullard levelled the score. But this was not the end of the scoring and with the game seemingly heading for extra-time, Danny Murphy scored the winner for Fulham in the second minute of stoppage time to win the encounter and send Fulham through to the third round.

In the third round, a Fulham side featuring the attacking talents of Johnson, Gera and Dempsey lost 1–0 to a Burnley side who had been performing well and sitting in the play-off positions in the Championship. With the match seemingly heading for extra-time, Jay Rodriguez won the match in the 88th minute. He collected a Chris Eagles through ball just inside the area and then slotted the ball past Pascal Zuberbühler. Fulham were therefore knocked out of the competition.

Date	Round	Opponents	H / A	Result F – A	Scorers	Attendance
27 August 2008	Second Round	Leicester City	H	3–2	Gera 31', Bullard 83', Murphy 90'+2 (Leicester: Dickov 46', A. King 48')
23 September 2008	Third Round	Burnley	A	0–1	(Burnley: Rodriguez 88')	7719

== Statistics ==
=== Squad statistics ===
Elliot Omozusi received Jimmy Bullard's squad number 21, when Bullard left the club. Giles Barnes wore number 7 while Seol Ki-hyeon was out on loan.

Statistics correct as of final match against Everton, played 24 May 2009.

No.	Pos.	Name	League		FA Cup		Carling Cup		Other		Total		Discipline	
No.	Pos.	Name	Apps	Goals	Apps	Goals	Apps	Goals	Apps	Goals	Apps	Goals	Yellow card	Red card
1	GK	(Australia) Mark Schwarzer	38	0	5	0	1	0	0	0	44	0	0	0
2	DF	(Germany) Moritz Volz *	0	0	0	0	0	0	0	0	0	0	0	0
3	DF	(England) Paul Konchesky	36	1	5	0	1	0	0	0	42	1	5	0
4	DF	(Ghana) John Pantsil	37	0	2	0	0(1)	0	0	0	39(1)	0	8	0
5	DF	(Norway) Brede Hangeland	37	1	5	0	1	0	0	0	43	1	4	0
6	MF	(Iran) Andranik Teymourian **	0(1)	0	0	0	1	0	0	0	1(1)	0	1	0
7	MF	(South Korea) Seol Ki-hyeon *	2(2)	1	0	0	2	0	0	0	4(2)	1	0	0
7	MF	(England) Giles Barnes	0	0	0	0	0	0	0	0	0	0	0	0
8	FW	(England) Andrew Johnson	30(1)	7	4	3	1	0	0	0	34(1)	10	0	1
9	FW	(England) Bobby Zamora	32(3)	2	3(2)	2	1	0	0	0	36(5)	4	1	0
10	FW	(Norway) Erik Nevland	4(17)	4	2(1)	0	0(2)	0	0	0	6(20)	4	2	0
11	MF	(Hungary) Zoltán Gera	20(12)	2	2(2)	0	2	1	0	0	24(14)	3	2	0
12	GK	(England) David Stockdale	0	0	0	0	0	0	0	0	0	0	0	0
13	MF	(England) Danny Murphy	37	5	3(2)	1	1	1	0	0	41(1)	7	8	0
14	FW	(United States) Eddie Johnson *	0	0	0	0	0	0	0	0	0	0	0	0
15	FW	(Senegal) Diomansy Kamara	3(9)	4	0(2)	0	0	0	0	0	3(11)	4	0	0
16	MF	(France) Olivier Dacourt	0(9)	0	2(1)	0	0	0	0	0	2(10)	0	2	0
17	MF	(England) Julian Gray	0(1)	0	1(1)	0	0	0	0	0	1(2)	0	0	0
18	DF	(Northern Ireland) Aaron Hughes	38	0	6	0	1	0	0	0	44	0	0	0
19	GK	(Switzerland) Pascal Zuberbühler	0	0	0	0	1	0	0	0	1	0	0	0
20	MF	(Nigeria) Dickson Etuhu	20(2)	1	4	0	0	0	0	0	24(2)	1	2	0
21	MF	(England) Jimmy Bullard **	18	2	0	0	1	1	0	0	19	3	1	0
21	DF	(England) Elliot Omozusi	0	0	0	0	0	0	0	0	0	0	0	0
22	DF	(Sweden) Fredrik Stoor	0(1)	0	3	0	2	0	0	0	6	0	0	0
23	MF	(United States) Clint Dempsey	28(7)	7	4(1)	1	1	0	0	0	33(8)	8	5	0
24	MF	(England) Matthew Saunders	0	0	0	0	0	0	0	0	0	0	0	0
25	MF	(Wales) Simon Davies	33	2	4(1)	1	1	0	0	0	38(1)	3	2	0
26	MF	(Denmark) Leon Andreasen *	0(6)	0	1	0	1	0	0	0	2(6)	0	1	0
27	DF	(Australia) Adrian Leijer *	0	0	0	0	0	0	0	0	0	0	0	0
28	MF	(England) Rob Milsom	0(1)	0	0	0	0	0	0	0	0(1)	0	0	0
30	MF	(England) Wayne Brown *	0(1)	0	0	0	0	0	0	0	0(1)	0	0	0
33	DF	(Finland) Toni Kallio	2(1)	0	0	0	2	0	0	0	4(1)	0	1	0
34	DF	(Northern Ireland) Chris Baird	3(7)	0	0	0	1	0	0	0	4(7)	0	0	0
37	DF	(England) Chris Smalling	0(1)	0	0	0	0	0	0	0	0(1)	0	0	0
38	GK	(England) (Philippines) Neil Etheridge	0	0	0	0	0	0	0	0	0	0	0	0
	DF	(England) Adam Watts	0	0	0	0	0	0	0	0	0	0	0	0
	MF	(Algeria) Hamer Bouazza *	0	0	0	0	0	0	0	0	0	0	0	0
	DF	(Democratic Republic of the Congo) Gabriel Zakuani **	0	0	0	0	0	0	0	0	0	0	0	0
	FW	(Netherlands) Collins John *	0	0	0	0	0	0	0	0	0	0	0	0
	FW	(Brazil) Rico **	0	0	0	0	0	0	3	2	3	2	0	0
	DF	(England) Joe Anderson **	0	0	0	0	0	0	2	1	2	1	0	0
	MF	(England) Jordan Wilson **	0	0	0	0	0	0	4	1	4	1	0	0
	DF	(England) TJ Moncur **	0	0	0	0	0	0	4	0	4	0	0	0

- * Player out on loan
- ** Player left club

=== Top scorers ===
Player	PL	FAC	LC	Total
(England) Andrew Johnson	7	3	0	10
(United States) Clint Dempsey	7	1	0	8
(England) Danny Murphy	5	1	1	7
(Senegal) Diomansy Kamara	4	0	0	4
(England) Bobby Zamora	2	2	0	4
(Norway) Erik Nevland	4	0	0	4
(Wales) Simon Davies	2	1	0	3
(Hungary) Zoltán Gera	2	0	1	3

== Transfers ==
=== Summer ===
Mark Schwarzer arrived on a free transfer from Middlesbrough when his contract expired and fellow goalkeeper David Stockdale came from Darlington. Despite the promotion of West Bromwich Albion to the Premier League, Zoltán Gera rejected "the best contract the club could [offer]" and signed with Fulham. The club also signed Andranik Teymourian from Bolton Wanderers on 12 June 2008. Toni Kallio signed a permanent contract after a loan spell during the second half of the previous season. On 15 July 2008, Bobby Zamora and John Pantsil signed on a joint-deal from West Ham United. On 30 July 2008, Sweden international Fredrik Stoor signed a deal with the team, moving on from Rosenborg. Andy Johnson was bought from Everton for a fee of around £10.5 million, Fulham's second highest transfer fee.

Fulham released ten players, including Carlos Bocanegra, Philippe Christanval and goalkeeper Tony Warner. Paul Stalteri returned to Tottenham Hotspur after a loan spell and Brian McBride returned to the United States to play for the Chicago Fire. Norwich City took two of Fulham's players, Dejan Stefanović permanently and Elliot Omozusi on loan for the season. Two goalkeepers also left the club, as Ricardo Batista left for Sporting CP and veteran Kasey Keller was released. David Healy moved to Sunderland, Steven Davis made a permanent switch to Rangers and Moritz Volz and Hamer Bouazza both went out on loan. Alexey Smertin had his contract with Fulham terminated.

In

Date	Pos.	Name	From	Fee
22 May 2008	GK	(Australia) Mark Schwarzer	Middlesbrough	Free
4 June 2008	GK	(England) David Stockdale	Darlington	Undisclosed
11 June 2008	MF	(Hungary) Zoltán Gera	West Bromwich Albion	Free
12 June 2008	MF	(Iran) Andranik Teymourian	Bolton Wanderers	Free
24 June 2008	DF	(England) Chris Smalling	Maidstone United	Free
4 July 2008	DF	(Finland) Toni Kallio	(Switzerland) Young Boys	Undisclosed*
15 July 2008	FW	(England) Bobby Zamora	West Ham United	£6,300,000
15 July 2008	DF	(Ghana) John Paintsil	West Ham United	£6,300,000
30 July 2008	DF	(Sweden) Fredrik Stoor	(Norway) Rosenborg	£2,000,000
6 August 2008	GK	(Switzerland) Pascal Zuberbühler	(Switzerland) Neuchâtel Xamax	Free
7 August 2008	FW	(England) Andy Johnson	Everton	£12,500,000
29 August 2008	MF	(Nigeria) Dickson Etuhu	Sunderland	Undisclosed
1 September 2008	MF	(England) Julian Gray	Coventry City	Season-long loan

- Kallio had been on loan at the club since January on loan and signed a permanent two-year deal.
- Zamora and Paintsil came for a joint fee of £6,300,000.

Out

Date	Pos.	Name	To	Fee
23 May 2008	DF	(Canada) Paul Stalteri	Tottenham Hotspur	Loan return
23 May 2008	DF	(United States) Carlos Bocanegra	(France) Rennes	Free
23 May 2008	DF	(France) Philippe Christanval	Released	Free
23 May 2008	DF	(England) Ian Pearce	Oxted & District	Free
23 May 2008	MF	(New Zealand) Simon Elliott	Released	Free
23 May 2008	MF	(Finland) Jari Litmanen	(Finland) Lahti	Free
23 May 2008	MF	(Northern Ireland) Michael Timlin	Swindon Town	Free
23 May 2008	FW	(France) Ismael Ehui	Released	Free
23 May 2008	FW	(Sweden) Björn Runström	(Denmark) OB	Free
28 May 2008	GK	(England) Corrin Brooks-Meade	Released	Free
28 May 2008	GK	(Trinidad and Tobago) Tony Warner	Hull City	Free
28 May 2008	FW	(United States) Brian McBride	(United States) Chicago Fire	Free
16 July 2008	GK	(United States) Kasey Keller	(United States) Seattle Sounders FC	Free
18 July 2008	GK	(Portugal) Ricardo Batista	(Portugal) Sporting CP	Nominal
18 July 2008	DF	(Serbia) Dejan Stefanović	Norwich City	Undisclosed
25 July 2008	DF	(England) Nathan Ashton	Wycombe Wanderers	Undisclosed
21 August 2008	FW	(Northern Ireland) David Healy	Sunderland	Undisclosed
21 August 2008	MF	(Northern Ireland) Steven Davis	Rangers	£3,000,000
1 September 2008	MF	(Russia) Alexei Smertin		Contract terminated

=== Winter ===
The first departures of the winter transfer window happened in December when Lee Cook returned to his former club Queens Park Rangers on a permanent deal, having spent several months back there on loan. He had not made any first-team appearances for Fulham since signing in the summer 2007 transfer window. Gabriel Zakuani also moved to Peterborough United following a successful loan spell. Midfielder Jimmy Bullard also left the club on 23 January 2009, signing for Hull City in a £5 million deal. He had been a target for Bolton Wanderers but they decided not to pursue their interest in him. Adrian Leijer and Andranik Teymourian moved on loan to Norwich City and Barnsley respectively, with Elliot Omozusi returning from Norwich. Leon Andreasen signed for German side Hannover 96 on loan. TJ Moncur left the club to sign for League Two side Wycombe Wanderers.

Giles Barnes was Fulham's first signing during the winter transfer window, moving on loan from Derby County until the end of the season. He was also joined on transfer deadline day by former Leeds United player Olivier Dacourt, who also signed on loan from Inter Milan. Julian Gray made his loan signing from Coventry City a permanent deal.

In

Date	Pos.	Name	From	Fee
31 January 2009	MF	(England) Giles Barnes	Derby County	Loan
2 February 2009	MF	(France) Olivier Dacourt	Inter Milan	Loan
2 February 2009	MF	(England) Julian Gray	Coventry City	Undisclosed

Out

Date	Pos.	Name	To	Fee
5 December 2008	MF	(England) Lee Cook	Queens Park Rangers	Undisclosed
December 2008	DF	(Republic of the Congo) Gabriel Zakuani	Peterborough United	Free
2 January 2009	DF	(England) TJ Moncur	Wycombe Wanderers	Free
23 January 2009	MF	(England) Jimmy Bullard	Hull City	£5,000,000

=== Loan out ===
Date From	Date To	Pos.	Name	Moving To
19 July 2008	2 February 2009	DF	(England) Elliot Omozusi	(England) Norwich City
1 August 2008	8 January 2009	MF	(England) Lee Cook	(England) Queens Park Rangers
8 August 2008	1 January 2009	DF	(England) TJ Moncur	(England) Bradford City
9 August 2008	30 June 2009	MF	(Algeria) Hamer Bouazza	(England) Charlton Athletic
22 August 2008	30 June 2009	FW	(United States) Eddie Johnson	(Wales) Cardiff City
28 August 2008	30 June 2009	DF	(Germany) Moritz Volz	(England) Ipswich Town
31 August 2008	3 March 2009	FW	(Netherlands) Collins John	(Netherlands) NEC
11 September 2008	13 December 2008	DF	(Republic of the Congo) Gabriel Zakuani	(England) Peterborough United
21 November 2008	31 December 2009	MF	(England) Robert Milsom	(England) Southend United
8 January 2009	30 June 2009	MF	(Algeria) Hamer Bouazza	(England) Birmingham City
14 January 2009	30 June 2009	MF	(South Korea) Seol Ki-hyeon	(Saudi Arabia) Al-Hilal
2 February 2009	30 June 2009	DF	(Denmark) Leon Andreasen	(Germany) Hannover 96
2 February 2009	30 June 2009	DF	(Australia) Adrian Leijer	(England) Norwich City
2 February 2009	30 June 2009	MF	(Iran) Andranik Teymourian	(England) Barnsley
2 March 2009	30 June 2009	GK	(England) David Stockdale	(England) Leicester City
26 March 2009	30 June 2009	DF	(England) Adam Watts	(England) Northampton Town
2 April 2009	16 August 2009	MF	(England) Wayne Brown	(Finland) Turun Palloseura

- David Stockdale was initially signed by Leicester City on a one-month loan deal but this was later extended for the rest of the season.

== Club ==
=== Coaching staff ===
Position	Staff
Manager	(England) Roy Hodgson
Assistant manager	(England) Mike Kelly
First team coach	(England) Ray Lewington
Reserve team coach	(Scotland) Billy McKinlay

Last updated: 7 August
Source: Fulham FC

=== Kits ===
Supplier: Nike
Sponsor: LG

=== Other information ===
Chairman	(Egypt) Mohamed Al-Fayed
Ground (capacity and dimensions)	Craven Cottage (26,000 / 105x68 meters)

Updated to match played 7 August
Source: Fulham F.C. and Craven Cottage
