= 2009–10 Fulham F.C. season =

Fulham
2009–10 season
- Chairman: Mohamed al-Fayed
- Manager: Roy Hodgson
- Stadium: Craven Cottage
- Premier League: 12th
- FA Cup: Sixth round
- League Cup: Third round
- UEFA Europa League: Runners-up
- Top goalscorer: League: Bobby Zamora (8); All: Bobby Zamora (19)
Home colours	Away colours	Third colours

The 2009–10 season was Fulham's 112th professional season and their ninth consecutive season in the top flight of English football, the Premier League, since their return in 2001. They also competed in European competition for the second time in their history, in the newly formed UEFA Europa League after finishing in the seventh position in the 2008–09 season. After beginning in the qualifying rounds of the competition, Fulham eventually reached the final, where they lost 2–1 to Atlético Madrid after extra-time.

The fixtures for the Premier League season were announced on 17 June, with Fulham beginning the season against Portsmouth at Fratton Park on the weekend of 15 August. They entered the Football League Cup at the third round stage due to their participation in European competition. They also reached the quarter-finals of the FA Cup, where they were defeated by Tottenham Hotspur.

== Pre-season and friendlies ==
Fulham announced the first three fixtures of their 2009 pre-season schedule on 4 May 2009, with the team scheduled to tour Australia soon after the end of the squad's summer break. The team first played Gold Coast United at Skilled Park in Robina on Wednesday, 8 July. Next, the squad travelled to Melbourne to face Melbourne Victory at Etihad (Docklands) Stadium on Saturday, 11 July. The trip concluded with a match against Perth Glory at Members Equity Stadium (Perth Oval) on Wednesday, 15 July.

Upon their return to England, they played a friendly against AFC Bournemouth on 21 July and Peterborough United on 25 July. Further fixtures were added for the Development Squad against local semi-professional sides AFC Wimbledon, Woking, Aldershot, Staines and Walton Casuals. The team were also involved in a third round qualifying match for the UEFA Europa League. The draw was made on 17 July, giving Fulham a match against Lithuanian side FK Vėtra or Finnish club HJK Helsinki. Vėtra were confirmed as Fulham's opponents after winning the tie 3–2 on aggregate.

Their pre-season campaign started with defeat to Gold Coast United. Despite Danny Murphy scoring in the 15th minute, Gold Coast scored twice in the final ten minutes to win the match. This was followed by a 3–0 victory against Melbourne Victory and a 5–0 win against Perth Glory. Andy Johnson scored in both games and Erik Nevland scored a hat-trick against Perth to follow up a goal in Melbourne. Eddie Johnson and Andranik Teymourian were the other two scorers in the matches in Melbourne and Perth respectively.

Fulham's first match back in England was a 0–0 draw against AFC Bournemouth on 21 July at Dean Court. This was followed four days later by their final pre-season friendly, an eventful match at London Road against Peterborough United. Clint Dempsey and Bobby Zamora (2) gave Fulham a 3–0 half-time lead, but Aaron McLean and George Boyd (2) scored second-half goals to salvage a 3–3 draw.

Date	Opponents	H / A	Result F – A	Scorers	Attendance
8 July 2009	Gold Coast United	A	1–2	Danny Murphy 15' (Gold Coast: Milson 80', Smeltz 86')	10,336
11 July 2009	Melbourne Victory	A	3–0	A. Johnson 32' (pen.), E. Johnson 67', Nevland 72'	20,666
15 July 2009	Perth Glory	A	5–0	A. Johnson 16', Nevland 60', 64', 67' (hat-trick), Teymourian 84'	14,903
21 July 2009	AFC Bournemouth	A	0–0		3,030
25 July 2009	Peterborough United	A	3–3	Dempsey 21', Zamora 34', 45' (Peterborough: McLean 55', Boyd 85', 87' (pen.))	1,738

== Premier League ==
Fulham began their Premier League season with an away match at Fratton Park against Portsmouth. Their opponents were in financial trouble and had sold many of their top players, including Peter Crouch and Glen Johnson during the summer. A minute's applause was held before the game in memory of Fulham's former manager Sir Bobby Robson. In a game that Fulham controlled, Bobby Zamora put the away side in the lead after 13 minutes, deflecting a Clint Dempsey shot past Portsmouth goalkeeper David James. Both sides created chances but Fulham held the greater threat and won the match 1–0.

Fulham's second league match of the season was against near-neighbours Chelsea in the West London derby. Fulham were missing the injured Andy Johnson and new signing Damien Duff came into the side to replace him, with Dempsey playing alongside Zamora. Dempsey and Chelsea's Didier Drogba both had opportunities but, in the hot conditions, neither side had many shots in the first half. Drogba, however, gave Chelsea the lead five minutes before the break, shooting low past Schwarzer. Nicolas Anelka, the provider for Drogba's goal, doubled their lead from Drogba's throughball in the 76th minute, effectively sealing the match 2–0 in Chelsea's favour.

The third fixture of the season was an away match at Villa Park against Aston Villa. New midfield signing Jonathan Greening made his debut and Aaron Hughes captained the side in the absence of Murphy. Fulham got off to the worst possible start when John Paintsil, under pressure from Villa's Carlos Cuéllar, inadvertently headed the ball past Schwarzer. Villa had a few promising attacks, notably through the pace of striker Gabriel Agbonlahor, but Fulham created chances of their own in an even first half. However they could not score past goalkeeper Brad Friedel and were punished by a second goal, this time from their own player Agbonlahor on the hour mark. Villa held out for a 2–0 victory and Fulham lost their second successive Premier League match.

Date	Opponents	H / A	Result F – A	Scorers	Attendance
15 August 2009	Portsmouth	A	1–0	Zamora 13'	17,510
23 August 2009	Chelsea	H	0–2	(Chelsea: Drogba 39', Anelka 76')	25,404
30 August 2009	Aston Villa	A	0–2	(Aston Villa: Paintsil 3' (o.g.), Agbonlahor 59')	32,917
13 September 2009	Everton	H	2–1	Konchesky 57', Duff 79' (Everton: Cahill 33')	24,191
20 September 2009	Wolverhampton Wanderers	A	1–2	Murphy 66' (pen.) (Wolves: Doyle 18', Edwards 50')	27,670
26 September 2009	Arsenal	H	0–1	(Arsenal: Van Persie 52')	25,700
4 October 2009	West Ham United	A	2–2	Murphy 47' (pen.), Gera 57' (West Ham: Cole 16', Stanislas 90+2')	32,612
19 October 2009	Hull City	H	2–0	Zamora 43', Kamara 64'	23,943
25 October 2009	Manchester City	A	2–2	Duff 62', Dempsey 68' (Man City: Lescott 53', Petrov 60')	44,906
31 October 2009	Liverpool	H	3–1	Zamora 24', Nevland 73', Dempsey 87' (Liverpool: Torres 42')	25,700
8 November 2009	Wigan Athletic	A	1–1	Dempsey 39' (pen.) (Wigan: Boyce 13')	16,172
21 November 2009	Birmingham City	A	0–1	(Birmingham City: Bowyer 16')	23,659
25 November 2009	Blackburn Rovers	H	3–0	Nevland 43', Dempsey 67', 88'	21,414
28 November 2009	Bolton Wanderers	H	1–1	Duff 75' (Bolton Wanderers: Klasnić 35')	23,554
6 December 2009	Sunderland	H	1–0	Zamora 7'	23,168
12 December 2009	Burnley	A	1–1	Zamora 50' (Burnley: Elliott 60')	18,397
19 December 2009	Manchester United	H	3–0	Murphy 22', Zamora 46', Duff 75'	25,700
26 December 2009	Tottenham Hotspur	H	0–0		25,679
28 December 2009	Chelsea	A	1–2	Gera 4' (Chelsea: Drogba 73', Smalling 75' (o.g.))	41,805
5 January 2010	Stoke City	A	2–3	Duff 61', Dempsey 85' (Stoke: Tuncay 12', Faye 34', Sidibé 37')	25,104
17 January 2010	Blackburn Rovers	A	0–2	(Blackburn: Samba 25', Nelsen 54')	21,287
26 January 2010	Tottenham Hotspur	A	0–2	(Tottenham: Crouch 27', Bentley 60')	35,467
30 January 2010	Aston Villa	H	0–2	(Aston Villa: Agbonlahor 40', 44')	25,408
3 February 2010	Portsmouth	H	1–0	Greening 74'	21,934
6 February 2010	Bolton Wanderers	A	0–0		22,289
9 February 2010	Burnley	H	3–0	Murphy 23', Elm 31', Zamora 54'	23,005
21 February 2010	Birmingham	H	2–1	Duff 23' Zamora 91' (Birmingham: Baird 3' (o.g.))	21,758
28 February 2010	Sunderland	A	0–0		40,192
14 March 2010	Manchester United	A	0–3	(Man Utd: Rooney 46', 84', Berbatov 89')	75,207
21 March 2010	Manchester City	H	1–2	Murphy 75' (Man City: Santa Cruz 7', Tevez 36')	25,359
27 March 2010	Hull City	A	0–2	(Hull City: Bullard 16', Fagan 48')	24,361
4 April 2010	Wigan Athletic	H	2–1	Okaka 47' Hangeland 58' (Wigan: Scotland 3')	22,730
11 April 2010	Liverpool	A	0–0		42,331
17 April 2010	Wolverhampton Wanderers	H	0–0		25,597
25 April 2010	Everton	A	1–2	Nevland 36' (Everton: Smalling 49' (o.g.), Arteta 94')	35,578
2 May 2010	West Ham United	H	3–2	Dempsey 45' Cole (o.g) 58' Okaka 79' (West Ham: Cole 61' Franco 92')	24,201
5 May 2010	Stoke City	H	0–1	(Stoke: Etherington 83')	20,831
9 May 2010	Arsenal	A	0–4	(Arsenal: Arshavin 21' Van Persie 26' Baird 37' (o.g.) Vela 84')	60,039

Pos	Team	Pld	W	D	L	GF	GA	GD	Pts
10	Blackburn Rovers	38	13	11	14	41	55	−14	50
11	Stoke City	38	11	14	13	34	48	−14	47
12	Fulham	38	12	10	16	39	46	−7	46
13	Sunderland	38	11	11	16	48	56	−8	44
14	Bolton Wanderers	38	10	9	19	42	67	−25	39

Source: Barclays Premier League

=== Results summary ===
Overall								Home						Away					
Pld	W	D	L	GF	GA	GD	Pts	W	D	L	GF	GA	GD	W	D	L	GF	GA	GD
38	12	10	16	39	46	−7	46	11	3	5	27	15	+12	1	7	11	12	31	−19

Last updated: 9 May.
Source: Barclays Premier League

=== Results by round ===
Round	1	2	3	4	5	6	7	8	9	10	11	12	13	14	15	16	17	18	19	20	21	22	23	24	25	26	27	28	29	30	31	32	33	34	35	36	37	38
Ground	A	H	A	H	A	H	A	H	A	H	A	A	H	H	H	A	H	H	A	A	A	A	H	H	A	H	H	A	A	H	A	H	A	H	A	H	H	A
Result	W	L	L	W	L	L	D	W	D	W	D	L	W	D	W	D	W	D	L	L	L	L	L	W	D	W	W	D	L	L	L	W	D	D	L	W	L	L
Position	8	12	15	10	14	17	15	12	13	11	11	12	10	10	8	9	9	9	9	9	9	9	11	10	10	9	9	9	10	10	12	11	12	10	12	10	12	12

Updated to match(es) played on 9 May. Source: Fulham Fixture List 2009/2010
A = Away; H = Home; W = Win; D = Draw; L = Loss

== FA Cup ==
Date	Opponents	Round	H / A	Result F – A	Scorers	Attendance
2 January 2010	Swindon Town	3rd round	H	1–0	Zamora 16'	19,623
23 January 2010	Accrington Stanley	4th round	A	3–1	Nevland 21', Duff 59', Gera 80' (Accrington Stanley: Symes 25')	3,712
14 February 2010	Notts County	5th round	H	4–0	Davies 22', Zamora 41', Duff 73', Okaka 79'	16,132
6 March 2010	Tottenham Hotspur	6th round	H	0–0		24,533
24 March 2010	Tottenham Hotspur	6th round replay	A	1–3	Zamora 17' (Tottenham Hotspur: Bentley 47' Pavlyuchenko 60' Guðjohnsen 66')

== Football League Cup ==
In the third round draw, Fulham were drawn against fellow Premier League side Manchester City, who had spent £120 million on new players during the summer.

Date	Opponents	H / A	Result F – A	Scorers	Attendance
23 September 2009	Manchester City	A	1–2	Gera 34' (Man City: Barry 52', Touré 111' AET)	24,507

== UEFA Europa League ==
Fulham began their first European campaign in seven years with a third qualifying round tie against FK Vėtra from Lithuania. The first leg was played away at the Vėtra Stadium on 30 July 2009. Hodgson started with his preferred line-up from the previous season, with Brede Hangeland, Aaron Hughes, John Pantsil and Paul Konchesky in front of Schwarzer and the front pairing of Andy Johnson and Bobby Zamora. Dickson Etuhu was the only absentee, giving an opportunity to Chris Baird in central midfield. The game was tight for the first half-hour before Fulham seized the initiative and Bobby Zamora gave them the lead on the stroke of half-time with a shot just inside the penalty area. Danny Murphy doubled Fulham's advantage from the penalty spot in the 56th minute following a foul on Zamora. Both sides made changes but Fulham continued to press and they added a third goal through Seol Ki-hyeon five minutes from the end. A minute's silence was held before the second match at Craven Cottage following the death of former Fulham manager Sir Bobby Robson. Fulham took the lead in the 57th minute through Etuhu, putting the tie beyond any real doubt at 4–0. Andy Johnson scored two further goals from close range in the 80th and 84th minutes, the latter set up by his namesake Eddie Johnson. Fulham progressed to the next round and awaited the identity of their opponents for the play-offs.

The draw for the play-off round was conducted on 7 August and saw Fulham drawn against the unfamiliar opposition of Amkar Perm from Russia. In the first leg at Craven Cottage, Andy Johnson scored early on in the 4th minute to settle any nerves but he also picked up an injury to his collarbone in the first half and had to be substituted. Clint Dempsey scored a second goal just after half-time and Zamora added to the lead in the 75th minute. Amkar Perm did manage to score an away-goal two minutes later in the shape of a Martin Kushev volley but Fulham held a 3–1 advantage. Fulham travelled to Russia for the second leg without the presence of injured first-team regulars Andy Johnson, Murphy, Zamora and Konchesky. Amkar Perm dominated the match but did not score a goal until the last minute when Martin Kushev scored a header past Schwarzer. Fulham's 3–1 victory from the first leg, however, was enough to see them through 3–2 on aggregate.

The draw for the group stages was made a day later. Fulham were drawn in Group E along with Roma of Italy, Swiss side Basel and Bulgaria's CSKA Sofia.

=== Group stage ===
Date	Round	Opponents	H / A	Result F – A	Scorers	Attendance	Referee
30 July	Third qualifying round, 1st leg	(Lithuania) Vėtra	A	3–0	Zamora 44', Murphy 56' (pen.), Seol 84'	5,900	Fritz Stuchlik (Austria)
6 August	Third qualifying round, 2nd leg	(Lithuania) Vėtra	H	3–0	Etuhu 57', A. Johnson 80', 84'	15,016	Istvan Vad (Hungary)
20 August	Play-off round, 1st leg	(Russia) Amkar Perm	H	3–1	A. Johnson 4', Dempsey 51', Zamora 75' (Amkar Perm: Vitaliy Grishin 77')	13,029	Pedro Proença (Portugal)
27 August	Play-off round, 2nd leg	(Russia) Amkar Perm	A	0–1	(Amkar Perm: Kushev 90')	20,000	Markus Strombergsson (Sweden)
17 September	Group stage	(Bulgaria) CSKA Sofia	A	1–1	Kamara 65' (CSKA Sofia: Michel 62')	28,000	Darko Čeferin (Slovenia)
1 October	Group stage	(Switzerland) Basel	H	1–0	Murphy 57'	16,100	Michael Weiner (Germany)
22 October	Group stage	(Italy) Roma	H	1–1	Hangeland 24' (Roma: Andreolli 90+3')	23,561	Paul Allaerts (Belgium)
5 November	Group stage	(Italy) Roma	A	1–2	Kamara 19' (pen.) (Roma: John Arne Riise 69', Okaka 76')	20,000	Kevin Blom (Netherlands)
3 December	Group stage	(Bulgaria) CSKA Sofia	H	1–0	Gera 14'	23,604	Cristian Balaj (Romania)
16 December	Group stage	(Switzerland) Basel	A	3–2	Zamora 42', 45', Gera 77' (Basel: A. Frei 64' (pen.), Streller 87')	20,063	Stefan Johannesson (Sweden)
18 February	Round of 32, 1st leg	(Ukraine) Shakhtar Donetsk	H	2–1	Gera 3', Zamora 63' (Shakthar Donetsk: Luiz Adriano 32')	21,832	Serge Gumienny (Belgium)
25 February	Round of 32, 2nd leg	(Ukraine) Shakhtar Donetsk	A	1–1	Hangeland 33' (Shakthar Donetsk: Jádson 69')	47,509	Svein Oddvar Moen (Norway)
11 March	Round of 16, 1st leg	(Italy) Juventus	A	1–3	Etuhu 36' (Juventus: Legrottaglie 9', Zebina 25', Trezeguet 48')	11,402	Florian Meyer (Germany)
18 March	Round of 16, 2nd leg	(Italy) Juventus	H	4–1	Zamora 9', Gera 39',49' (pen.), Dempsey 82' (Juventus: Trezeguet 2')	23,458	Björn Kuipers (Netherlands)
1 April	Quarter-final, 1st leg	(Germany) VfL Wolfsburg	H	2–1	Zamora 59', Duff 63' (Wolfsburg: Madlung 89')	22,307	Damir Skomina (Slovenia)
8 April	Quarter-final, 2nd leg	(Germany) VfL Wolfsburg	A	1–0	Zamora 1'	24,843	Viktor Kassai (Hungary)
22 April	Semi-final, 1st leg	(Germany) Hamburger SV	A	0–0		49,171	Claus Bo Larsen (Denmark)
29 April	Semi-final, 2nd leg	(Germany) Hamburger SV	H	2–1	Davies 69', Gera 76' (Hamburg: Petrić 22')	25,700	Cüneyt Çakır (Turkey)
12 May	Final	(Spain) Atlético Madrid	N	2–1	Davies 37' (Atlético: Forlán 32',116,)	49,000	Terje Hauge (Norway)

Pos	Team	Pld	W	D	L	GF	GA	GD	Pts	Qualification
1	(Italy) Roma	6	4	1	1	10	5	+5	13	Advance to knockout phase
2	(England) Fulham	6	3	2	1	8	6	+2	11	Advance to knockout phase
3	(Switzerland) Basel	6	3	0	3	10	7	+3	9	
4	(Bulgaria) CSKA Sofia	6	0	1	5	2	12	−10	1	

Source: Soccerway

== Statistics ==
=== Appearances and goals ===
Last updated on 9 May 2010.

The squad numbers were announced at the beginning of the 2009–10 season. Chris Baird was given the number 6 shirt, which Andranik Teymourian wore during the 2008–09 season – Teymourian was given the number 14 shirt instead. Seol Ki-hyeon managed to get back the number 7 after Giles Barnes returned to Derby County after having been at Fulham on loan. Bobby Zamora was given the number 25 shirt, pushing Simon Davies to number 29. The players with higher squad numbers changed squad numbers to fill the list. Before Joe Anderson left the club and made his debut, he was given the number 36 shirt.

No.	Pos	Nat	Player	Total		Premier League		Europa League		FA Cup		League Cup	
No.	Pos	Nat	Player	Apps	Goals	Apps	Goals	Apps	Goals	Apps	Goals	Apps	Goals
1	GK	(Australia) AUS	Mark Schwarzer	60	0	37	0	18	0	5	0	0	0
2	DF	(Republic of Ireland) IRL	Stephen Kelly	22	0	7+1	0	9+1	0	3	0	1	0
3	DF	(England) ENG	Paul Konchesky	42	1	27	1	13	0	2	0	0	0
4	DF	(Ghana) GHA	John Paintsil	37	0	27	0	9+1	0	0	0	0	0
5	DF	(Norway) NOR	Brede Hangeland	52	3	32	1	16	2	4	0	0	0
6	DF	(Northern Ireland) NIR	Chris Baird	52	0	29+3	0	13+3	0	3	0	1	0
7	DF	(England) ENG	Nicky Shorey	11	0	9	0	0	0	2	0	0	0
8	FW	(England) ENG	Andrew Johnson	13	3	7+1	0	4	3	1	0	0	0
9	FW	(Italy) ITA	Stefano Okaka	13	3	3+8	2	0	0	0+2	1	0	0
10	FW	(Norway) NOR	Erik Nevland	33	4	12+11	3	2+7	0	1	1	0	0
11	MF	(Hungary) HUN	Zoltán Gera	50	10	19+8	2	18	6	3+1	1	1	1
12	GK	(England) ENG	David Stockdale	3	0	1	0	1	0	0	0	1	0
13	MF	(England) ENG	Danny Murphy	41	7	25	5	13	2	3	0	0	0
14	MF	(Iran) IRI	Andranik Teymourian	0	0	0	0	0	0	0	0	0	0
16	MF	(Republic of Ireland) IRL	Damien Duff	50	9	30+2	6	10+4	1	4	2	0	0
17	MF	(Norway) NOR	Bjørn Helge Riise	28	0	5+7	0	7+5	0	2+1	0	1	0
18	DF	(Northern Ireland) NIR	Aaron Hughes	56	0	34	0	16+1	0	5	0	0	0
19	GK	(Switzerland) SUI	Pascal Zuberbühler	0	0	0+0	0	0	0	0	0	0	0
20	MF	(Nigeria) NGR	Dickson Etuhu	37	2	14+6	0	14	2	3	0	0	0
22	DF	(Sweden) SWE	Fredrik Stoor	3	0	0+2	0	0	0	0	0	1	0
23	MF	(United States) USA	Clint Dempsey	44	9	27+2	7	6+7	2	1+1	0	0	0
25	FW	(England) ENG	Bobby Zamora	48	19	27	8	16+1	8	4	3	0	0
26	DF	(England) ENG	Chris Smalling	18	0	9+3	0	4	0	1	0	1	0
27	MF	(England) ENG	Jonathan Greening	38	1	15+8	1	6+1	0	6+1	0	1	0
29	MF	(Wales) WAL	Simon Davies	33	3	12+5	0	11	2	3+1	1	1	0
34	MF	(South Africa) RSA	Kagisho Dikgacoi	15	0	7+5	0	0	0	1+1	0	0+1	0
35	FW	(Sweden) SWE	David Elm	16	1	3+7	1	0+2	0	1+2	0	0+1	0
Players who are no longer playing for Fulham or who have been loaned out in the January transfer window:
7	FW	(South Korea) KOR	Seol Ki-hyeon	5	1	0+2	0	0+2	1	0	0	1	0
15	FW	(Senegal) SEN	Diomansy Kamara	13	3	5+4	1	3+1	2	0	0	0	0
21	FW	(United States) USA	Eddie Johnson	4	0	0+2	0	0+1	0	0	0	1	0
33	DF	(Finland) FIN	Toni Kallio	2	0	0+1	0	0	0	1	0	0	0
36	DF	(England) ENG	Joe Anderson	1	0	0	0	0	0	0	0	0+1	0

=== Top scorers ===
Includes all competitive matches. The list is sorted by shirt number when total goals are equal.

Last updated on 9 May 2010

Position	Nation	Number	Name	Premier League	Europa League	FA Cup	League Cup	Total
1	(England)	25	Bobby Zamora	8	8	3	0	19
2	(Hungary)	11	Zoltán Gera	2	6	1	1	10
3	(Republic of Ireland)	16	Damien Duff	6	1	2	0	9
=	(United States)	23	Clint Dempsey	7	2	0	0	9
4	(England)	13	Danny Murphy	5	2	0	0	7
5	(Norway)	10	Erik Nevland	3	0	1	0	4
6	(Norway)	5	Brede Hangeland	1	2	0	0	3
=	(England)	8	Andrew Johnson	0	3	0	0	3
=	(Italy)	9	Stefano Okaka	2	0	1	0	3
=	(Senegal)	15	Diomansy Kamara	1	2	0	0	3
=	(Wales)	29	Simon Davies	0	2	1	0	3
7	(Nigeria)	20	Dickson Etuhu	0	2	0	0	2
8	(England)	3	Paul Konchesky	1	0	0	0	1
=	(South Korea)	7	Seol Ki-hyeon†	0	1	0	0	1
=	(England)	27	Jonathan Greening	1	0	0	0	1
8	(Sweden)	35	David Elm	1	0	0	0	1
/	/	/	Own Goals	1	0	0	0	1
/	/	/	TOTALS	39	31	9	1	80

† = Player is no longer with the club but still scored a goal during the season.

=== Disciplinary record ===
Includes all competitive matches. Players with 1 card or more included only.

Last updated on 25 October 2009

Position	Nation	Number	Name	Premier League		Europa League		League Cup		FA Cup		Total (FA Total)	
Position	Nation	Number	Name	Y	R	Y	R	Y	R	Y	R	Y	R
DF	(Republic of Ireland)	2	Stephen Kelly	0	0	1	1	1	0	0	0	2 (1)	1 (0)
DF	(England)	3	Paul Konchesky	2	0	0	0	0	0	0	0	2 (2)	0
DF	(Ghana)	4	John Paintsil	3	0	1	0	0	0	0	0	4 (3)	0
DF	(Norway)	5	Brede Hangeland	2	0	0	0	0	0	0	0	2 (2)	0
DF	(Northern Ireland)	6	Chris Baird	0	0	2	0	0	0	0	0	2 (0)	0
MF	(England)	13	Danny Murphy	3	0	0	0	0	0	0	0	3 (3)	0
FW	(Senegal)	15	Diomansy Kamara	0	0	1	0	0	0	0	0	1 (0)	0
DF	(Northern Ireland)	18	Aaron Hughes	1	0	0	0	0	0	0	0	1 (1)	0
MF	(Nigeria)	20	Dickson Etuhu	1	0	0	0	0	0	0	0	1 (1)	0
FW	(United States)	21	Eddie Johnson	1	0	0	0	0	0	0	0	1 (1)	0
MF	(United States)	23	Clint Dempsey	0	0	1	0	0	0	0	0	1 (0)	0
FW	(England)	25	Bobby Zamora	1	0	0	0	0	0	0	0	1 (1)	0
DF	(England)	26	Chris Smalling	0	0	1	0	0	0	0	0	1 (0)	0
MF	(England)	27	Jonathan Greening	1	0	2	0	0	0	0	0	3 (1)	0
MF	(South Africa)	34	Kagisho Dikgacoi	0	1	0	0	1	0	0	0	1 (1)	1 (1)
			TOTALS	15	1	9	1	2	0	0	0	26 (17)	2 (1)

== Transfers ==
There was transfer speculation surrounding the futures of Brede Hangeland and Bobby Zamora, with the former wanted by several clubs including Arsenal and the latter by Hull City, however both remained at Fulham. Goalkeeper Mark Schwarzer was in talks about a new contract at the club. Danny Murphy signed a new contract during pre-season to keep him at the club until 2011.

=== In ===
Roy Hodgson made his first signing of the summer on 16 June when he brought in Stephen Kelly from Birmingham City on a free transfer. Bjørn Helge Riise, the brother of former Liverpool player John Arne Riise, became Fulham's second signing of the summer when he moved from Lillestrøm SK. Damien Duff was Fulham's third summer signing when he joined from Newcastle United for an undisclosed fee. Midfielder Jonathan Greening signed from West Bromwich Albion and he was joined by another midfielder, South African Kagisho Dikgacoi from Golden Arrows. Swedish international striker David Elm was the final transfer of the summer, signing on deadline day from Kalmar FF.

Date	Pos.	Name	From	Fee
16 June 2009	DF	(Republic of Ireland) Stephen Kelly	(England) Birmingham City	Free
22 July 2009	MF	(Norway) Bjørn Helge Riise	(Norway) Lillestrøm SK	Undisclosed
18 August 2009	MF	(Republic of Ireland) Damien Duff	(England) Newcastle United	Undisclosed
24 August 2009	MF	(England) Jonathan Greening	(England) West Brom	Season-long loan
27 August 2009	MF	(South Africa) Kagisho Dikgacoi	(South Africa) Golden Arrows	Undisclosed
1 September 2009	FW	(Sweden) David Elm	(Sweden) Kalmar FF	Undisclosed
1 February 2010	FW	(Italy) Stefano Okaka	(Italy) Roma	Season-long loan
1 February 2010	DF	(England) Nicky Shorey	(England) Aston Villa	Season-long loan
1 February 2010	DF	(Germany) Christopher Buchtmann	(England) Liverpool	Undisclosed

=== Out ===
Seven players left the club on 2 July: Karim Laribi, Collins John, Moritz Volz and Julian Gray were released; Giles Barnes and Olivier Dacourt departed at the end of their loan spells; Leon Andreasen made a permanent move to Hannover 96. Hamer Bouazza and Adrian Leijer were both released by the club; Bouazza moved to Turkish club Sivasspor while Leijer went to Melbourne Victory for an undisclosed fee.

Date	Pos.	Name	To	Fee
2 July 2009	DF	(Germany) Moritz Volz		Released
2 July 2009	FW	(Netherlands) Collins John	(Belgium) KSV Roeselare	Released
2 July 2009	DF	(Denmark) Leon Andreasen	(Germany) Hannover 96	£2.5m
2 July 2009	MF	(France) Olivier Dacourt	(Belgium) Standard Liège	End of Loan
2 July 2009	MF	(England) Julian Gray	(England) Barnsley	Released
2 July 2009	MF	(England) Giles Barnes	(England) Derby County	End of Loan
2 July 2009	DF	(Italy) Karim Laribi	(Italy) Palermo	Released
17 August 2009	MF	(Algeria) Hamer Bouazza	(Turkey) Sivasspor	Released
21 August 2009	DF	(Australia) Adrian Leijer	(Australia) Melbourne Victory	Undisclosed
1 January 2010	DF	(England) Joe Anderson	(England) Lincoln City	Undisclosed
1 January 2010	DF	(England) Adam Watts	(England) Lincoln City	Undisclosed
15 January 2010	FW	(South Korea) Seol Ki-hyeon	(South Korea) Pohang Steelers	Released

=== Loan Out ===
Date	Pos.	Name	To	Return Date
20 August 2009	MF	(England) Wayne Brown	(Finland) TPS Turku	31 October 2009
26 September 2009	DF	(Sweden) Fredrik Stoor	(England) Derby County	27 December 2009
2 October 2009	DF	(England) Adam Watts (Note: Adam Watts was due to return in November 2009, but extended his loan until 2 January 2010.)	(England) Lincoln City	2 January 2010
30 October 2009	DF	(England) Elliot Omozusi	(England) Charlton Athletic	1 December 2009
26 November 2009	DF	(Finland) Toni Kallio	(England) Sheffield United	23 December 2009
31 December 2009	FW	(United States) Eddie Johnson	(Greece) Aris Thessaloniki	30 June 2010
1 January 2010	MF	(England) Matthew Saunders	(England) Lincoln City	30 January 2010
1 January 2010	FW	(Nigeria) Michael Uwezu	(England) Lincoln City	30 January 2010
15 January 2010	DF	(England) Matthew Briggs	(England) Leyton Orient	13 February 2010
22 January 2010	GK	(England) David Stockdale	(England) Plymouth Argyle	18 February 2010
1 February 2010	DF	(Finland) Toni Kallio	(England) Sheffield United	End of season
1 February 2010	FW	(Senegal) Diomansy Kamara	(Scotland) Celtic	30 June 2010

== 2010 Europa League Final Lineup ==
12 May 2010
20:45 CEST

Atlético Madrid (Spain)	2–1 (a.e.t.)	(England) Fulham
Forlán 32', 116'	Report	Davies 37'

HSH Nordbank Arena, Hamburg
Attendance: 49,000
Referee: Nicola Rizzoli (Italy)

Atlético Madrid	Fulham

ATLÉTICO MADRID:
GK	43	(Spain) David de Gea
RB	17	(Czech Republic) Tomáš Ujfaluši
CB	21	(Colombia) Luis Perea
CB	18	(Spain) Álvaro Domínguez
LB	3	(Spain) Antonio López (c)
RM	19	(Spain) José Antonio Reyes		(substituted off) 78'
CM	12	(Brazil) Paulo Assunção
CM	8	(Spain) Raúl García	(yellow card) 114'
LM	20	(Portugal) Simão Sabrosa		(substituted off) 68'
CF	7	(Uruguay) Diego Forlán	(yellow card) 117'
CF	10	(Argentina) Sergio Agüero		(substituted off) 119'
Substitutes:
GK	42	(Spain) Joel Robles
DF	2	(Spain) Juan Valera		(substituted on) 119'
DF	16	(Spain) Juanito
DF	24	(Uruguay) Leandro Cabrera
MF	6	(Spain) Ignacio Camacho
MF	9	(Spain) José Manuel Jurado		(substituted on) 68'
FW	14	(Argentina) Eduardo Salvio	(yellow card) 107'	(substituted on) 78'
Manager:
(Spain) Quique Sánchez Flores

FULHAM:
GK	1	(Australia) Mark Schwarzer
RB	6	(Northern Ireland) Chris Baird
CB	18	(Northern Ireland) Aaron Hughes
CB	5	(Norway) Brede Hangeland	(yellow card) 63'
LB	3	(England) Paul Konchesky
RM	16	(Republic of Ireland) Damien Duff		(substituted off) 84'
CM	20	(Nigeria) Dickson Etuhu
CM	13	(England) Danny Murphy (c)		(substituted off) 118'
LM	29	(Wales) Simon Davies
AM	11	(Hungary) Zoltán Gera
CF	25	(England) Bobby Zamora		(substituted off) 55'
Substitutes:
GK	19	(Switzerland) Pascal Zuberbühler
DF	4	(Ghana) John Paintsil
MF	17	(Norway) Bjørn Helge Riise
MF	23	(United States) Clint Dempsey		(substituted on) 55'
MF	27	(England) Jonathan Greening		(substituted on) 118'
MF	34	(South Africa) Kagisho Dikgacoi
FW	10	(Norway) Erik Nevland		(substituted on) 84'
Manager:
(England) Roy Hodgson

Man of the Match:
(Uruguay) Diego Forlán (Atlético)

Assistant referees:
(Italy) Cristiano Copelli (touchline)
(Italy) Luca Maggiani (touchline)
(Italy) Paolo Tagliavento (penalty area)
(Italy) Andrea De Marco (penalty area)
Fourth official:
(Italy) Gianluca Rocchi
Reserve official:
(Italy) Nicola Nicoletti
