= Chris Baird =

Northern Irish footballer (born 1982)

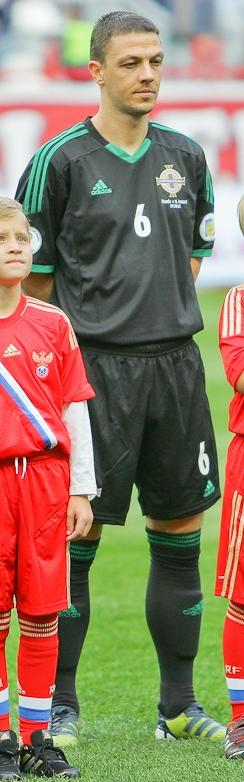
- Baird playing for Northern Ireland in 2012

Personal information
- Full name: Christopher Patrick Baird
- Date of birth: 25 February 1982 (age 44)
- Place of birth: Ballymena, Northern Ireland
- Height: 6 ft 1 in (1.85 m)
- Positions: Defender; midfielder

Youth career
- –1998: Ballymena United
- 1998–2001: Southampton

Senior career*
Years	Team	Apps	(Gls)
2001–2007	Southampton	68	(3)
2003	→ Walsall (loan)	10	(0)
2004	→ Watford (loan)	8	(0)
2007–2013	Fulham	127	(4)
2013–2014	Reading	9	(0)
2014	Burnley	7	(0)
2014–2015	West Bromwich Albion	19	(0)
2015–2018	Derby County	69	(0)
2016	→ Fulham (loan)	7	(0)
Total		328	(7)

International career
	Northern Ireland U18	4	(0)
2002–2003	Northern Ireland U21	6	(1)
2003–2016	Northern Ireland	79	(0)
- * Club domestic league appearances and goals

Christopher Patrick Baird (born 25 February 1982) is a Northern Irish former professional footballer who last played for Derby County and represented the Northern Ireland national football team from 2003 to 2016. His preferred position was right-back or centre-half, but he also played on occasion as a left-back, defensive midfielder and central midfielder. In addition to his three-year stint at Derby County, Baird previously played for Southampton, Fulham, Reading, Burnley and West Bromwich Albion.

== Club career ==
=== Southampton ===
Baird started his career at Northern Irish club, Ballymena United, before moving to Southampton in 1998. Baird went on to make his progress through the Southampton's Academy and in 2001, Baird signed his first professional contract with the club, keeping him until 2002.

Baird made his debut for Southampton on 22 March 2003 as a late substitute for David Prutton in a 2–2 draw at home to Aston Villa. His second appearance came in a 6–1 defeat at Arsenal, when he came on after 26 minutes to replace Fabrice Fernandes, with Arsenal already 5–0 up. Baird's first start came on the final day of the 2002–03 League season, in a 1–0 win at Manchester City. A week later, he started for Southampton in the 2003 FA Cup final, also against Arsenal. Southampton lost the match 1–0, but Baird was voted as the Saints man of the match.

In the 2003–04 season, Baird struggled to make the first team and was loaned out to Walsall on a one–month deal. Baird made his Walsall debut on 27 September 2003, in a 2–1 win over Preston North End. Baird then provided an assist for one of the goals for Darren Wrack, in a 2–0 win over Wigan Athletic on 25 October 2003. Baird's regular playing time in the first team saw him extend his loan spell at Walsall for another month, leading manager Colin Lee to unsuccessfully try to sign him for £1 million. Baird was sent off in his last appearance for Walsall, when he received a second yellow card, in a 0–0 draw against Crystal Palace on 21 November 2003.

After his loan spell at Walsall came to an end, Baird made his first Southampton appearance of the 2003–04 season, in a 3–1 win over local rivals Portsmouth on 21 December 2003. With his first team opportunities limited, Baird joined Watford on a month loan. Baird made his Watford debut on 20 March 2004, in a 4–1 loss against Ipswich Town. On 16 April 2004, Baird's loan spell at Watford extended until the end of the season. After making eight appearances for Watford, Baird returned to his parent club and played the last game of the season. Baird made only four league appearances for Southampton.

Ahead of the 2004–05 season, Baird said he was considering leaving Southampton if he does not get a guarantee first team place under new manager Paul Sturrock. Nevertheless on 1 July 2004, Baird signed a two–year contract with the club. Despite guarantee of first team football under Sturrock, Baird, however, was left out the squad for Saints' pre-season tour of Sweden. As a result, Baird's lack of first opportunities frustrated him and was planned on re-joining Watford on loan, only to be blocked by Harry Redknapp. Baird never made an appearance for the club in the 2004–05 season, as the club were relegated to the Championship. Following Southampton's relegation from the Premiership, Baird was told by Redknapp that he was to be loaned out to get first experience, but this never happened. After Redknapp's departure to Portsmouth, Baird made his first Southampton appearance in two years in a 1–0 win over Luton Town on 11 December 2005. He started 16 league games in the 2005–06 season. Despite this, Baird signed a three–year contract with the club.

In the first game of the 2006–07 season, away to Derby County on 6 August 2006, he was drafted into the centre half position when Claus Lundekvam went off injured in the sixth minute. On 25 November 2006, in his 50th first-team game for Southampton, he scored his first professional goal in a 2–1 victory over Luton Town. Having established himself in the Southampton team, he was singled out for praise by Southampton manager George Burley. During the match in a 4–3 win over against Birmingham City on 29 November 2006, Baird find himself in alteration with goalkeeper Kelvin Davis after the pair shoved each other and the tension were so high that teammates got involved to calm the situation. However, this was played down by Burley. His second goal of the season came on 26 December 2006, in a 1–1 draw against Crystal Palace. Baird then scored his third goal of the same on 13 March 2007, in a 2–2 draw against Cardiff City. Despite missing out two matches, due to a groin injury, Baird spent most of the 2006–07 season in central defence, making forty–four appearances and at the end of the season he was the winner of the Saints Player of the Season award.

At the end of the 2006–07 season, Baird found himself in a transfer move when Fulham made an initial £2.5m bid for him, which was rejected by Southampton. In response, Baird informed the club that he wanted to leave by handing in a transfer request. Despite being confident of keeping Baird, Burley, stated that he would sell Baird at the right price. In response to Burley's comment, Fulham increased their bid to sign Baird. Baird, himself, later stated it wasn't an easy decision to leave Southampton.

=== Fulham ===
Baird left Southampton on 12 July 2007 to move to Premier League club Fulham for £3.025 million, where he linked up with manager Lawrie Sanchez. Baird was also linked with a move to Sunderland, but was in favour in joining Fulham.

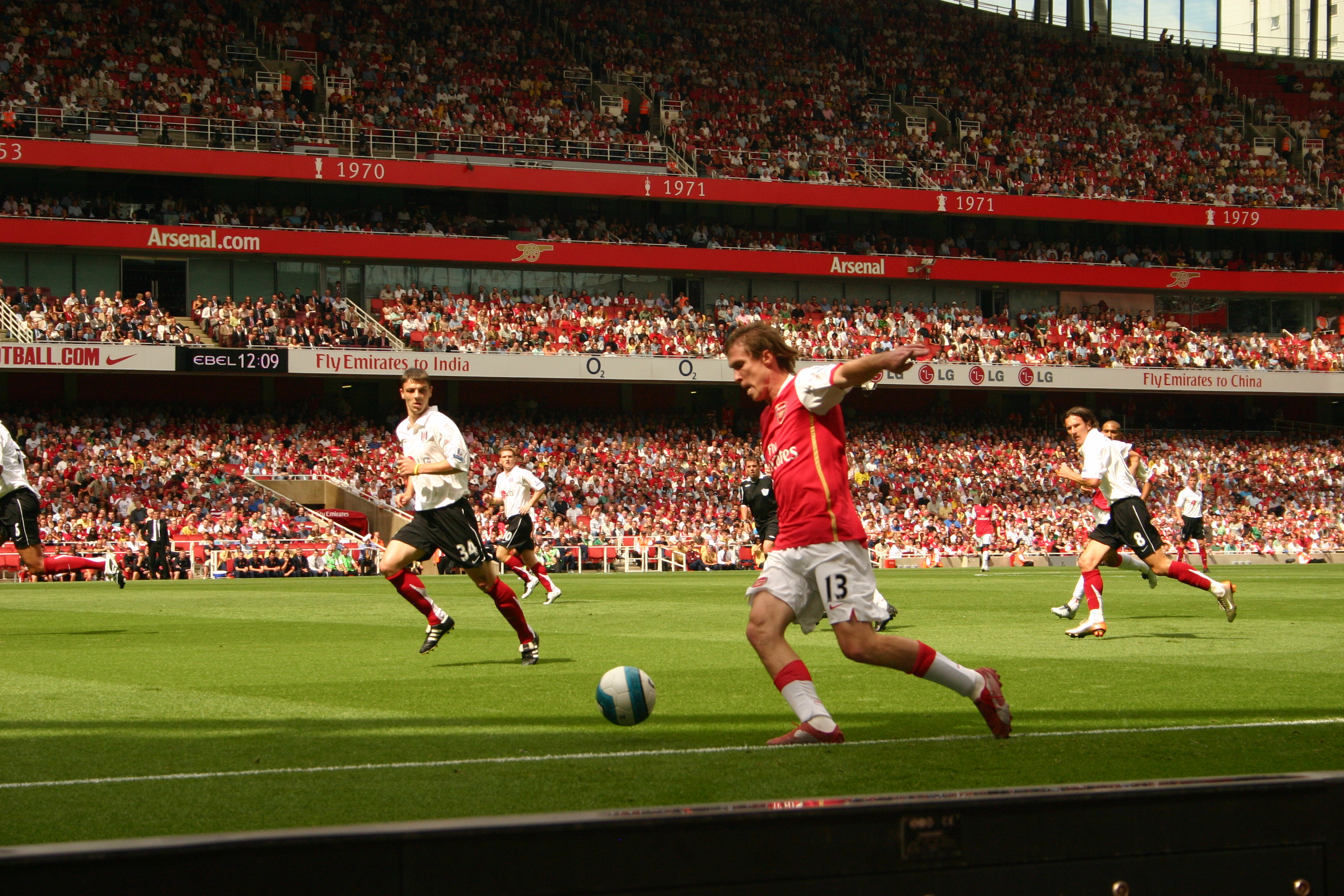
Baird making his Fulham debut, as he defended against Arsenal's Alexander Hleb.

Baird made his Fulham debut, in the opening game of the season, in a 2–1 loss against Arsenal. Weeks later on 25 August 2007, Baird was sent–off after receiving a second bookable offence, in a 2–1 loss against Aston Villa and served a suspension in the second round in the League Cup against Shrewsbury Town. However, Baird struggled to make a first team breakthrough, due to injuries and was fell out favour for the remainder of the season, under Manager Roy Hodgson. Despite this, Baird made eighteen appearances in his first season at Fulham. Due to lack of first team opportunity, Baird was linked with a move to Scottish Premier League side Rangers.

Having initially worn the number 34 shirt, he changed to the number 6 for the 2009–10 season. Although typically a centre-back, and often surplus to requirements behind the rarely injured pairing of Aaron Hughes and Brede Hangeland, manager Roy Hodgson brought out a versatility in Baird which made him indispensable for long periods at Fulham, where first he filled in very successfully at right-back when John Paintsil was injured, and then due to the injuries to Dickson Etuhu and Danny Murphy he was often used in a central midfield role during the 2009–10 season, returning to right-back when they regained fitness. His success at right-back also earned him a start in the UEFA Europa League against Atlético Madrid ahead of the fit-again Paintsil. The season saw Baird redeem himself at Fulham, where he made thirty–two appearances for the club.

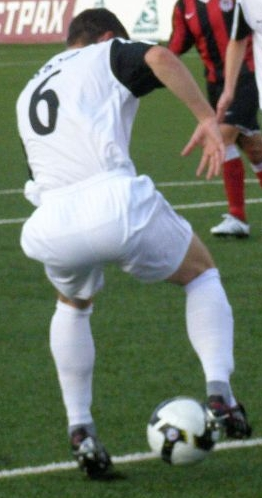
Baird in action for the club in 2010.

In the 2010–11 season, Baird remained on the bench for the first three matches, with Panstil regaining his first team place as a right–back, under new manager Mark Hughes. On 11 September 2010, Baird made his first appearance of the season, in a 2–1 win over Wolves. On 14 September 2010 Baird signed a new contract with Fulham, keeping him at Craven Cottage until at least the summer of 2013, and on 28 December 2010 he scored his first and second goals for Fulham against Stoke City at the Britannia Stadium in a 2–0 victory. This was voted the second Fulham "Goal of the Season" by the Fulham fans, just behind his teammate Mousa Dembélé. Both were long-range strikes, earning him the nickname "Bairdinho" amongst Fulham fans. Baird was charged with abusive and insulting gestures towards a match official during a match against Liverpool on 9 May 2011, after he played the full 90 minutes and picked up a yellow card by referee Lee Mason in the 5–2 defeat at Craven Cottage. He then subsequently missed the last two games of the season against Birmingham City and Arsenal and was replaced by Philippe Senderos. Despite this, Baird made twenty–nine appearances for the club in the 2010–11 season.

The 2011–12 season was a less successful one for Baird. With the arrival of Martin Jol as manager he found it difficult to get games, having to rely mostly on injuries to in-form right-back Stephen Kelly, but his proven versatility meant that he was almost always on the bench, and was the go-to substitute for central midfield, right-back and sometimes centre-back as well. Despite making nineteen appearances for the club in the 2011–12 season, Baird dismissed claims he heading for an exit and expressed desire to fight for his first team place.

With Kelly falling out of favour in the early part of the 2012–13 season, and injuries to players like Mahamadou Diarra, plus the departures of Danny Murphy, Mousa Dembélé and Dickson Etuhu, Baird has become a regular in central midfield again, alongside Steve Sidwell, and with just those two goals at Stoke to his name for Fulham in 113 games prior to 20 October 2012, he scored in consecutive weeks at the end of October, the first being the winner in the 1–0 defeat of Aston Villa and then scoring a header in a 3–3 draw with Reading on 27 October 2012. In January transfer window, Baird started negotiations with a move to West Brom, but the move to West Brom was broken down and stayed at Fulham. Baird sat out from the first team and made nineteen appearances for the 2012–13 season.

Baird was one of twelve players released by Fulham at the end of the 2012–13 Premier League season.

=== Reading ===
Despite training with QPR for two weeks and receiving a contract offer, Baird signed for Reading on 20 September 2013 on a deal until January 2014.

He made his debut the next day in a 3–1 win over Derby at Pride Park. Then on 9 November 2013, Baird provided assist for Garath McCleary to score the opener, in a 1–1 draw against QPR. However, a few weeks later, Baird sustained ankle injury that kept him out in the sidelined for weeks. But on 20 January 2014, Baird's contract was expired and left the club.

=== Burnley ===
After being left without a club since leaving Reading in January, Baird signed for Burnley on 20 March 2014 on a short-term deal until May 2014.

Two days after signing for the club, Baird made his Burnley debut, playing as a right–back, in a 3–0 win over Charlton Athletic. After the match, Baird said it was nice to make his return to the pitch, in addition, with a victory, though he was tired during the game. Two weeks later on 5 April 2014, Baird then provided assist for Scott Arfield, in a 1–1 draw against Watford.

At the end of the 2013–14 season, Baird went on to make seven appearances, as he played a little role of helping Burnley reaching promotion to the Premier League. Despite this, the club was keen to keep a hold of Baird beyond the season.

=== West Bromwich Albion ===
Baird returned to the Premier League on 7 July 2014, signing a one-year contract at West Bromwich Albion.

Baird made his West Brom debut, coming on as a substitute for Chris Brunt in the 77th minute, in the opening game of the season, with a 2–2 draw against Sunderland. Baird then made his first start for the club on 22 November 2014, in a 2–0 loss against Chelsea. However, Baird struggled in the first team, due to being on the substitute bench and injuries. Towards the end of the season, Baird initially played in the left–back position, but soon played in defensive–midfielder for four matches.

At the end of the 2014–15 season, it was announced that Baird was released by the club.

=== Derby County ===
After leaving West Brom, Baird signed for Derby County in June 2015 on a two-year contract. Upon joining the club, Baird was given a number twelve shirt.

Ahead of the 2015–16 season, Baird was given the captain armband, succeeding Richard Keogh, under the new management of Paul Clement. Upon learning he was the new captain, Baird said it was an honour, while Manager Clement cited his responsibilities and great qualities as the reason he was appointed captain.

Baird made his Derby County debut in the opening game of the season, in a 0–0 draw against Bolton Wanderers. Baird remained as captain for the first six matches, playing in the right–back and defensive midfielder until he suffered a concussion during a match against Preston North End and missed two matches as a result. After making his first team return against MK Dons on 26 September 2015, Baird was dropped to the substitute bench and played six times between October and December.

However, Baird struggled to be in the first team, having been sidelined to substitute bench and injuries. As a result, Baird lost his first team place to Cyrus Christie. Following Clement's sacking, Baird was removed as a captain and captaincy was returned to Keogh for the remainder of the season. Baird played his last game as captain on 6 February 2016, in a 1–1 draw against Fulham. Baird went on to make fourteen league appearances for Derby County in his first season. On 18 February 2016, Baird re–joined his former club Fulham on loan until the end of the season. Baird then made his Fulham debut two days later, playing forty–five minutes after coming on as a substitute, in a 3–0 win over Charlton Athletic. But unfortunately in mid–March, Baird suffered ankle injury. After missing three matches, Baird then made his return to the first team the following month on 9 April 2016, coming on as a substitute in the 77th minute, in a 2–1 win over Cardiff City.

Despite hopes of re-joining the club permanently, Baird was recalled from his loan on 2 May 2016. He was released by Derby at the end of the 2017–18 season.

In February 2019, Baird announced his retirement as a player with immediate effect.

== International career ==
On 3 June 2003, Baird made his Northern Ireland début against Italy in a 2–0 defeat, becoming a regular member of the national side, despite playing little domestically between 2003 and 2005.

In March 2007, Baird was called up by the national team despite sustaining a groin injury against Colchester United a week before. Baird missed two international matches as a result. Northern Ireland FA deemed it a failure to comply to call-up, thus invoked a FIFA rule which states that "any player who fails to comply with a call-up for whatever reason may not play for his club for the duration of the call-up plus one day," and Southampton would risk points deduction by playing him during the said period. Baird then made his 50th international cap on 25 March 2011 and was given a captaincy against Serbia. He was previously given a captaincy in August 2007 against Liechtenstein in a Euro 2008 qualifier.

On 18 May 2016, Baird was selected as part of the provisional 27-man squad to represent Northern Ireland in the UEFA Euro 2016 competition. On 28 May 2016, Baird was named in the final 23 man Euro 2016 squad for Northern Ireland.

On 17 August 2016, Baird announced his retirement from international football.

== Personal life ==
In September 2010 his mother's home in Rasharkin was petrol bombed by the loyalists in a sectarian attack.

Baird became a father on New Years Day in 2005 when his partner gave birth to a daughter, Shannon. In May 2006, Baird and his partner, Sarah, were married.

== Career statistics ==
=== Club ===
Appearances and goals by club, season and competition
Club	Season	League			FA Cup		League Cup		Europe		Other		Total	
Club	Season	Division	Apps	Goals	Apps	Goals	Apps	Goals	Apps	Goals	Apps	Goals	Apps	Goals
Southampton	2002–03	Premier League	3	0	1	0	0	0	—		—		4	0
Southampton	2003–04	Premier League	4	0	0	0	0	0	0	0	—		4	0
Southampton	2004–05	Premier League	0	0	0	0	0	0	—		—		0	0
Southampton	2005–06	Championship	17	0	2	0	1	0	—		—		20	0
Southampton	2006–07	Championship	44	3	2	0	3	0	—		2 (Note: Appearances in the Championship play-offs)	0	51	3
Southampton	Total		68	3	5	0	4	0	0	0	2	0	79	3
Walsall (loan)	2003–04	First Division	10	0	—		—		—		—		10	0
Watford (loan)	2003–04	First Division	8	0	—		—		—		—		8	0
Fulham	2007–08	Premier League	18	0	2	0	1	0	—		—		21	0
Fulham	2008–09	Premier League	10	0	0	0	1	0	—		—		11	0
Fulham	2009–10	Premier League	32	0	3	0	1	0	16 (Note: Appearances in the Europa League)	0	—		52	0
Fulham	2010–11	Premier League	29	2	2	0	0	0	—		—		31	2
Fulham	2011–12	Premier League	19	0	1	0	1	0	7	0	—		28	0
Fulham	2012–13	Premier League	19	2	2	0	1	0	—		—		22	2
Fulham	Total		127	4	10	0	5	0	23	0	—		165	4
Reading	2013–14	Championship	9	0	0	0	0	0	—		—		9	0
Burnley	2013–14	Championship	7	0	—		—		—		—		7	0
West Bromwich Albion	2014–15	Premier League	19	0	3	0	2	0	—		—		24	0
Derby County	2015–16	Championship	14	0	1	0	1	0	—		—		16	0
Fulham (loan)	2015–16	Championship	7	0	—		—		—		—		7	0
Career total			269	7	19	0	12	0	23	0	2	0	325	7

=== International ===
Appearances and goals by national team and year
National team	Year	Apps	Goals
Northern Ireland	2003	5	0
Northern Ireland	2004	7	0
Northern Ireland	2005	7	0
Northern Ireland	2006	6	0
Northern Ireland	2007	5	0
Northern Ireland	2008	8	0
Northern Ireland	2009	6	0
Northern Ireland	2010	4	0
Northern Ireland	2011	8	0
Northern Ireland	2012	5	0
Northern Ireland	2013	3	0
Northern Ireland	2014	5	0
Northern Ireland	2015	7	0
Northern Ireland	2016	3	0
Total		79	0

== Honours ==
Southampton

- FA Cup runner-up: 2002–03

Fulham

- UEFA Europa League runner-up: 2009–10

Burnley

- Football League Championship second-place promotion: 2013–14

Individual

- Southampton Fans' Player of the Season: 2006–07
