= Adam Watts =

Adam Watts may refer to:

- Adam Watts (footballer) (born 1988), English footballer
- Adam Watts (musician) (born 1975), American musician, songwriter and producer

== See also ==
- Adam Watt (born 1967), Australian boxer and kickboxer
