= Joe Anderson (footballer, born 1989) =

English association football player

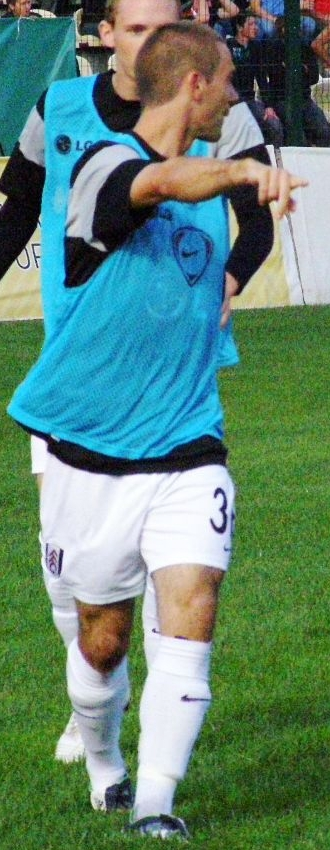
- Anderson warming up for Fulham in 2009

Personal information
- Full name: Joe William Anderson
- Date of birth: 13 October 1989 (age 37)
- Place of birth: Stepney, England
- Height: 5 ft 11 in (1.80 m)
- Position: Left-back

Team information
- Current team: Welling United

Youth career
- 2005–2006: Chelsea
- 2006–2008: Fulham

Senior career*
Years	Team	Apps	(Gls)
2008–2010	Fulham	0	(0)
2009	→ Woking (loan)	14	(1)
2010–2011	Lincoln City	45	(0)
2011–2012	AFC Hornchurch	40	(1)
2012–2013	Billericay Town	18	(0)
2013	Cambridge United	5	(0)
2013–2017	Bromley	165	(6)
2017–2018	Maidstone United	42	(2)
2018–2019	Chelmsford City	37	(1)
2019–2021	Welling United	22	(0)
2021–2022	Margate	36	(1)
- * Club domestic league appearances and goals as of 19:38, 4 February 2023 (UTC)

Joe William Anderson (born 13 October 1989) is an English retired semi-professional footballer, who usually played as a left-back.

== Career ==
=== Fulham ===
Born in Stepney, London, Anderson began his career as a youth player at Fulham before he was promoted to the reserve team and was loaned out to Woking during the second half of the 2008–09 season. After signing his first professional contract, he quickly earned a first team place.

Anderson made his first team debut for Fulham on 23 September 2009 in a 2–1 League Cup defeat at the City of Manchester Stadium against Manchester City, coming on as a replacement for Zoltán Gera in extra time.

Anderson was five times an unused substitute for Fulham's Europa League group matches against Amkar Perm, CSKA Sofia, Basel and Roma (home and away).

=== Lincoln City ===
On 31 December it was announced that Anderson would be joining Lincoln City on a permanent deal with the Imps that will run until the summer of 2011. The deal was officially completed when the transfer window reopened on 1 January 2010.

On 9 February 2011, it was announced that Anderson had been training with Grimsby Town ahead of a potential loan move, however Grimsby did not follow there interest in the player and he returned to Sincil Bank after spending a week with The Mariners.

In May 2011 he was not offered a new contract after a mass clear out of players following the club's relegation from the Football League.

=== Hornchurch ===
In August 2011, he joined AFC Hornchurch, debuting in the club's Isthmian League Premier Division 2–1 defeat at Lowestoft Town on 29 August 2011. Anderson was voted Hornchurch's 2011–12 player of the season.

=== Billericay Town ===
In September 2012, Anderson signed for Billericay Town. After making a total of 23 appearances in all competitions, he left the club in February 2013.

=== Cambridge United ===
Shortly after leaving Billericay, Anderson joined Cambridge United on a short-term deal. He made his debut on 12 February 2013, in a 3–0 home defeat to Alfreton Town. He went on to make four further appearances before leaving the club at the end of the season.

=== Bromley ===
Anderson joined Conference South side Bromley on 5 June 2013. He scored his first goal for the club in a 4–1 home win over Dorchester Town on 2 November 2013. He then scored a free-kick in Bromley's next match, a 5–0 win over Chelmsford City. Anderson's next goal came on 10 December, in a 2–0 away win over Dover Athletic. In December 2013, Anderson was named Conference South player of the month. Manager Mark Goldberg won the Manager of the month award. His final goal of the league season came in a 2–1 away win over Gosport Borough on 26 April. Having spent four seasons at the club, Anderson departed Bromley towards the end of the 2016–17 season.

=== Maidstone United ===
On 27 May 2017, Anderson joined Maidstone United on a permanent deal. On 4 August Anderson made his full debut in the 1–1 draw with newly promoted Maidenhead United playing the full 90 minutes. At the end of the 2017–18 season Anderson was released by Maidstone having made more than 50 appearances for The Stones over the course of the season.

=== Chelmsford City ===
On 14 May 2018, Anderson signed for Chelmsford City. On 11 August 2018, Anderson scored his first goal for the club, scoring the opener in a 6–0 win against Hungerford Town. On 9 May 2019, Anderson was released by Chelmsford.

=== Welling United ===
On 17 June 2019, Welling United announced that they had signed Anderson.

=== Margate ===
On 20 May 2022, Anderson announced his retirement from football.

== Career statistics ==
As of match played 28 April 2018

Appearances and goals by club, season and competition
Club	Season	League			FA Cup		League Cup		Other		Total	
Club	Season	Division	Apps	Goals	Apps	Goals	Apps	Goals	Apps	Goals	Apps	Goals
Fulham	2008–09	Premier League	0	0	0	0	0	0	—		0	0
Fulham	2009–10	Premier League	0	0	0	0	1	0	0	0	1	0
Fulham	Fulham total		0	0	0	0	1	0	0	0	1	0
Woking (loan)	2008–09	Conference Premier	14	1	0	0	—		0	0	14	1
Lincoln City	2009–10	League Two	23	0	1	0	—		0	0	24	0
Lincoln City	2010–11	League Two	22	0	2	0	1	0	1 (Note: Appearance in the Football League Trophy)	0	26	0
Lincoln City	Lincoln total		45	0	3	0	1	0	1	0	50	0
AFC Hornchurch	2011–12	Isthmian Premier Division					—					
AFC Hornchurch	2012–13	Conference South	3	0	0	0	—		0	0	3	0
Billericay Town	2012–13	Conference South	18	0	3	0	—		3 (Note: One appearance in the Essex Senior Cup and two in the FA Trophy)	0	24	0
Cambridge United	2012–13	Conference Premier	5	0	—		—		0	0	5	0
Bromley	2013–14	Conference South	41	4	2	0	—		4 (Note: One appearance in the FA Trophy, one in the London Senior Cup and two in the Conference South play-offs)	0	47	4
Bromley	2014–15	Conference South	38	0	5	0	—		5 (Note: One appearance in the Kent Senior Cup and four in the FA Trophy)	0	48	0
Bromley	2015–16	National League	45	1	1	0	—		1 (Note: Appearance in the Kent Senior Cup)	0	47	1
Bromley	2016–17	National League	41	1	1	0	—		6 (Note: Three appearances in the Kent Senior Cup and three in the FA Trophy)	0	48	1
Bromley	Bromley total		165	6	9	0	0	0	16	0	190	6
Maidstone United	2017–18	National League	42	2	4	0	—		4 (Note: Appearance in the FA Trophy)	0	50	2
Career total			292	9	19	0	2	0	24	0	337	9
