= David Stockdale =

English footballer (born 1985)

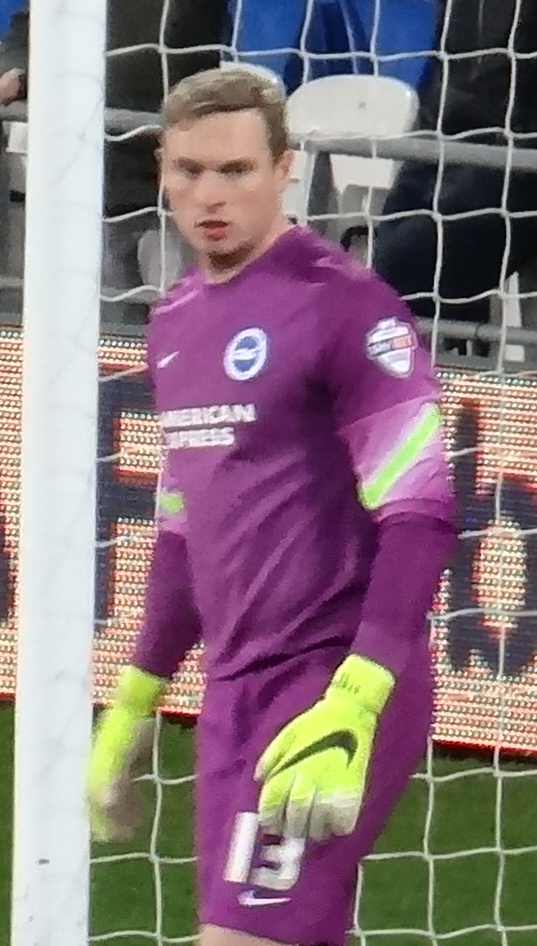
- Stockdale playing for Brighton & Hove Albion in 2015

Personal information
- Full name: David Adam Stockdale
- Date of birth: 20 September 1985 (age 41)
- Place of birth: Leeds, England
- Height: 6 ft 3 in (1.91 m)
- Position: Goalkeeper

Team information
- Current team: FC Farsley (manager)

Youth career
- –2000: Huddersfield Town
- 2000–2003: York City

Senior career*
Years	Team	Apps	(Gls)
2003–2006	York City	24	(0)
2005	→ Wakefield-Emley (loan)	7	(0)
2006	→ Worksop Town (loan)	6	(0)
2006–2008	Darlington	47	(0)
2008–2014	Fulham	39	(0)
2008–2009	→ Rotherham United (loan)	8	(0)
2009	→ Leicester City (loan)	8	(0)
2010	→ Plymouth Argyle (loan)	21	(0)
2011	→ Ipswich Town (loan)	18	(0)
2012	→ Hull City (loan)	5	(0)
2013	→ Hull City (loan)	19	(0)
2014–2017	Brighton & Hove Albion	133	(0)
2017–2020	Birmingham City	36	(0)
2018	→ Southend United (loan)	3	(0)
2018	→ Wycombe Wanderers (loan)	2	(0)
2019	→ Coventry City (loan)	2	(0)
2020	→ Wycombe Wanderers (loan)	2	(0)
2020–2022	Wycombe Wanderers	63	(0)
2021	→ Stevenage (loan)	5	(0)
2022–2023	Sheffield Wednesday	24	(0)
2023–2024	York City	4	(0)
Total		436	(0)

International career
2004	England C	1	(0)

Managerial career
- 2024: Blyth Spartans
- 2025: Farsley Celtic
- 2025–: FC Farsley
- * Club domestic league appearances and goals

David Adam Stockdale (born 20 September 1985) is an English football manager and former professional player who is manager of FC Farsley.

A goalkeeper, Stockdale started his career with the Huddersfield Town youth system before joining York City's youth system in 2000, where he became a trainee in 2002. He made his first-team debut on the last day of the 2002–03 season. He established himself in the team during 2004–05 and in 2006, following loan spells at Wakefield-Emley and Worksop Town, was released by the club. He moved to Darlington and in his second season with the club played in the play-offs. He signed for Premier League club Fulham for an undisclosed fee in 2008, but never became a regular, and spent several spells on loan to Football League clubs. He joined Brighton & Hove Albion of the Championship in 2014, and helped them win promotion to the Premier League in his third season with the club. He turned down a new contract with Brighton, and signed for Birmingham City in 2017. In the 2018–19 season, he spent short spells on loan at Southend United, Wycombe Wanderers and Coventry City. He has been called up to the England squad but remains uncapped.

He worked as head of recruitment for York City before joining Blyth Spartans where he was briefly first-team manager, and joined Farsley Celtic as manager in 2025.

== Club career ==
=== York City ===
Born in Leeds, West Yorkshire, Stockdale played for the Huddersfield Town youth system before joining the York City youth system in 2000 and was promoted from the under-16 team to the under-19 team for a match against Bradford City in October 2001. He was offered a scholarship by the club in February 2002 to become a first-year trainee for the 2002–03 season. By March 2003 he had established himself as the York first team's number two goalkeeper, having ousted John Collinson. He made his debut for York as a 17-year-old when coming on as a 46th-minute substitute for Michael Ingham in the last match of 2002–03, which the team lost 2–0 at Oxford United on 3 May 2003.

Stockdale's first appearance of 2004–05 came as a 20th-minute substitute for Chris Porter in a 1–0 defeat to Accrington Stanley on 31 August 2004. After playing 19 successive matches from August to December, he was dropped by caretaker manager Viv Busby. Despite this, he stated his determination at earning a new contract with York. After discussing his future at York with manager Billy McEwan he was offered a one-year professional contract in April 2005. He stalled on this contract offer and McEwan criticised him, saying "He's a young apprentice getting his first professional contract and the last thing in his mind should be money. That should be of secondary importance and he should be grateful York City are offering him a contract". He was ruled out of most of York's pre-season schedule after breaking a bone in his foot in July. Contract talks between Stockdale and York progressed and on 9 August he signed on for the club.

Stockdale made a loan move to Northern Premier League Premier Division club Wakefield-Emley in September and made his debut in a 1–0 victory over Gateshead. After making seven appearances for Wakefield-Emley he returned to York in October and was rewarded with a place on the bench for the team's match against Canvey Island. Having lost his place on the bench to teenager Arran Reid he signed for Conference North club Worksop Town on 1 March 2006, after McEwan questioned his commitment to the club. He made his debut in a 1–1 draw with Vauxhall Motors on 14 March and the loan was extended for a second month in April. Stockdale made six appearances for Worksop. He was released by York at the end of 2005–06, after being publicly criticised by McEwan about his weight.

=== Darlington ===
Stockdale joined League Two club Darlington on a one-year contract on 1 August 2006 after impressing in a period on trial in pre-season. He made eight appearances in 2006–07, and when first-choice goalkeeper Andy Oakes was sent off in the opening match of 2007–08, Stockdale took over and became manager Dave Penney's preferred choice in goal. Stockdale was rewarded with a new contract in November 2007, and went on to make over 40 appearances for Darlington in 2007–08. Stockdale was scouted by Premier League clubs including Birmingham City and Newcastle United before, in April 2008, Darlington accepted a bid from Fulham. He remained with Darlington until the end of the season, won the club's Player of the Year award, and played in the play-offs, in which they lost 5–4 in a penalty shoot-out to Rochdale in the semi-final after the matches had ended 3–3 on aggregate.

=== Fulham ===
Stockdale completed his move to Fulham on 4 June 2008 on a two-year contract; the fee was undisclosed, but reported as £350,000 potentially rising to £600,000. He returned to League Two after joining Rotherham United on a one-month loan on 21 November. He made his debut a day later in a 2–0 defeat to Bradford City, and in his next match, a 1–1 draw away at Exeter City, he saved a Ben Watson penalty and made a late save from a Ryan Harley header. The loan deal was extended for a further month, and he finished the spell with eight appearances, all in league competition.

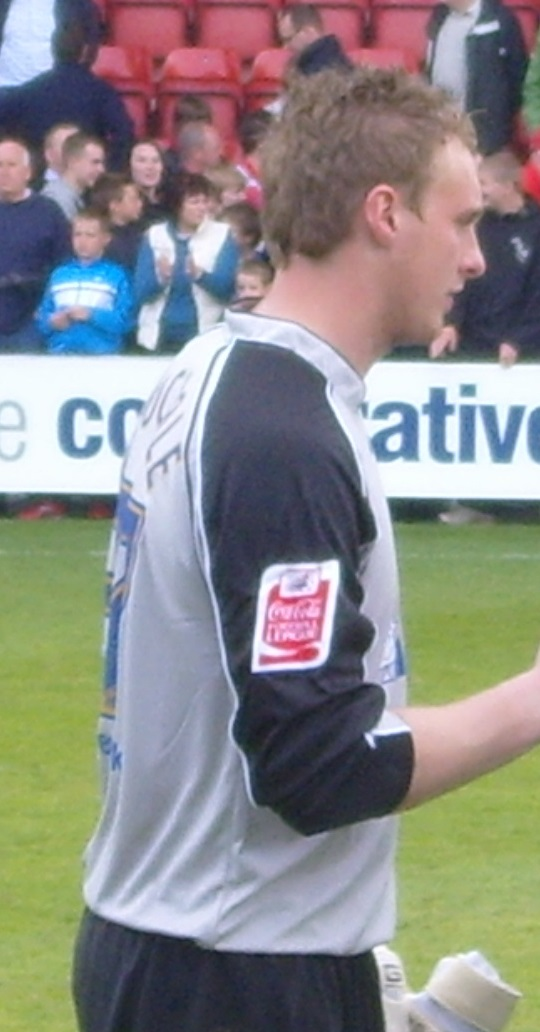
Stockdale training with Leicester City in 2009

On 2 March 2009, Stockdale joined League One club Leicester City on a one-month loan as cover for senior goalkeepers David Martin and Paul Henderson after previous loanee Mark Bunn was recalled by parent club Blackburn Rovers. He made his debut in Leicester's 1–1 draw with Stockport County the next day. He later picked up a shoulder injury, which led to Leicester signing Tony Warner on loan. Stockdale extended his loan at Leicester until the end of the season on 6 April. He played for Leicester as their promotion to the Championship as League One champions was confirmed after a 2–0 victory over Southend United, after which he said he would be interested in joining the club for the following season.

Stockdale made his Fulham debut on 13 September 2009 in a 2–1 victory at home to Everton. Stockdale was Fulham's number two goalkeeper for the team's UEFA Europa League campaign; he was at the centre of controversy when he and the reserve goalkeepers were injured ahead of the fixture against FC Basel, but UEFA refused to allow the club to bring in the club's other senior goalkeeper, Pascal Zuberbühler, at short notice. On 29 December, his contract was extended to June 2013. On 22 January 2010, he joined Championship club Plymouth Argyle on a one-month loan until 18 February, after impressing in a behind-closed-doors friendly between the two clubs. He made 21 appearances for the club as they were relegated to League One.

Due to Mark Schwarzer being injured in pre-season and being linked with a move to Arsenal, Stockdale was the first-choice goalkeeper at Fulham at the start of the 2010–11 season. He started the season by keeping a clean sheet at Bolton Wanderers, and followed up by saving a penalty kick at Craven Cottage against Manchester United in a 2–2 draw on 22 August. He continued his run in the team in January due to Schwarzer's participation in the AFC Asian Cup, starting with West Bromwich Albion where he kept a clean sheet. He went on to appear in five further matches during January. Stockdale played 10 matches under manager Mark Hughes during 2010–11, 7 of which were in the Premier League.

In June 2011, new Fulham manager Martin Jol said he wanted to loan Stockdale out to get a regular run of matches, but had no intention of selling the player. After reports of interest from Championship clubs Swansea City and Leeds United, Stockdale said he would be willing to join either club and was prepared to drop down a division for regular football. Swansea had a £2 million bid rejected on 11 July, and Stockdale tweeted that he would "love to help [his] hometown club back to where they belong" if a move to Leeds became an option. He later stated that "complications" prevented such a move.

On 26 July 2011, Stockdale signed a new four-year contract with Fulham and subsequently went out on a one-year loan to Championship club Ipswich Town. He made 18 appearances for Ipswich before an injury to Mark Schwarzer in mid-December meant he was recalled to Fulham.

On 22 November 2012, Stockdale moved to Hull City on loan until 2 January 2013. He made his debut on 24 November 2012 in the 1–0 loss at home to Burnley. After making five appearances for Hull he was recalled by Fulham on 19 December 2012. Stockdale returned to Hull on 18 January 2013 on loan for what remained of the season, and made 19 appearances as the team earned promotion to the Premier League as Championship runners-up.

=== Brighton & Hove Albion ===
Stockdale signed for Championship club Brighton & Hove Albion on a three-year contract for an undisclosed fee on 28 July 2014. He made his debut on 9 August, the opening day of the season, in a 1–0 defeat against Sheffield Wednesday, and appeared in 42 league matches as Albion finished 20th in the table. He was active in his support for the families of victims of the 2015 Shoreham Airshow crash, which led to his being named as Brighton & Hove Albion's PFA Community Champion.

During the 2015–16 season, he kept 17 clean sheets, helping Brighton finish third in the Championship and qualify for the playoffs. They lost in the semi-final over two legs to Sheffield Wednesday.

Stockdale made 45 appearances in 2016–17, saving a Stefan Johansen penalty in a 2–1 win over his former club Fulham, and keeping 20 clean sheets as Brighton were promoted to the Premier League. A poor finish to the season, during which Stockdale scored two own goals in a defeat away to Norwich City, meant Albion finished as runners-up to Newcastle United. He was named in the 2016–17 PFA Championship Team of the Year, and was runner-up to Anthony Knockaert as Albion's player of the season.

=== Birmingham City ===
Stockdale chose to reject Brighton's offer of a new contract and instead signed for three years with Birmingham City of the Championship. He said afterwards that he needed a longer deal because he did not want to disrupt his daughter's education by uprooting the family as often as had happened in the past. He went straight into the starting eleven for the opening fixture of the 2017–18 season, which Birmingham lost 1–0 away to Ipswich Town, and kept his place until he injured his wrist in mid September. He returned to the starting eleven two months later, in a 1–1 draw with Sheffield United, and kept his place for the rest of the campaign. He made what the Daily Telegraph reporter dubbed a magnificent save from Fulham's Aleksandar Mitrović in the final game of the season to help Birmingham avoid relegation and end their opponents' 23-match unbeaten run.

Stockdale joined Southend United on 8 September 2018 on an initial seven-day loan, as the League One club had only one goalkeeper available. He made his debut the same day, starting in their 3–2 home defeat to Peterborough United, and played three matches before Southend's main goalkeeper, Mark Oxley, returned from suspension.

Stockdale joined another League One club, Wycombe Wanderers, on 22 November on a seven-day emergency loan, due to injuries to both first- and second-choice keepers, Ryan Allsop and Yves Ma-Kalambay. He made his debut in a 3–2 win at home to Shrewsbury Town, and in his second match, in which Wycombe came back from a goal down to win away to Accrington Stanley, the Press Association reported that "Accrington could have extended their advantage but for [Stockdale's] heroics".

His third stint on loan in League One began on 8 February 2019; this time he joined Coventry City, both of whose senior goalkeepers were injured. He played twice before returning to his parent club.

He played in Birmingham's 3–0 defeat away to Portsmouth in August 2019, when manager Pep Clotet fielded a shadow squad, but the starting spot in league matches was shared by Lee Camp and Connal Trueman. After Wycombe Wanderers' second-choice goalkeeper, Cameron Yates, was injured in training, Stockdale returned to the club on 24 January 2020 on loan until the end of the season. He was an unused substitute in Wycombe's 2–1 win over Oxford in the 2020 League One play-off final at Wembley, as the club was promoted to the Championship for the first time.

=== Wycombe Wanderers ===
After being released from Birmingham, Stockdale signed for Wycombe Wanderers for a third occasion, this time permanently. He re-joined the club on 9 September 2020, agreeing a one-year deal. He served as back-up goalkeeper to Ryan Allsop throughout the 2019–20 season, making two appearances in all competitions.

==== Loan to Stevenage ====
Having not played first-team football in over a year, Stockdale joined League Two club Stevenage on an emergency two-week loan deal on 2 February 2021, providing temporary cover for the injured Jamie Cumming. He made his debut for Stevenage in the club's 1–0 home defeat to Exeter City on the same day as his signing was announced. In his third appearance for Stevenage, Stockdale provided the assist for Danny Newton's goal in a 1–0 away victory at Tranmere Rovers on 9 February 2021. It was also Stockdale's first clean sheet in over two years. He was subsequently named in the EFL League Two 'Team of the Week' for his performance. In the final appearance of the two-week agreement, Stockdale saved a 90th-minute penalty to help Stevenage record a 1–0 victory at Crawley Town; again being named in the EFL League Two 'Team of the Week'.

==== Return to Wycombe ====
Just four days after his return from Stevenage, Stockdale made his first competitive start for Wycombe in over a year after Allsop suffered an injury in training. He helped the team to keep a clean sheet on his return; as Wycombe and Millwall played out a goalless draw at The Den on 20 February 2021. He continued as first choice for the rest of the season, as Wycombe were relegated to League One. He renewed his contract in May 2021, as Allsop left the club on a free transfer. Stockdale was the undisputed first choice throughout the 2021-22 season, starting every game and keeping 18 clean sheets. For that tally he was awarded the 2021–22 League One Golden Glove, jointly with Plymouth Argyle's Michael Cooper.

=== Sheffield Wednesday ===
On 15 June 2022, it was announced Stockdale would join Sheffield Wednesday following the expiration of his contract at Wycombe. He made his Wednesday debut, starting against Portsmouth on 30 July 2022. Following promotion back to the EFL Championship it was confirmed that Stockdale would be released following the end of his contract.

=== Return to York City ===
On 4 June 2023, York City confirmed that Stockdale would be returning to the club, combining the role with head of recruitment. Stockdale was released by York City on 22 April 2024.

== International career ==
He was named in the England C squad (non-League under-23s) in October 2004 for a friendly against Italy, and he came on as a substitute for Nikki Bull in the 1–0 victory on 10 November. He was included in the 25-man squad for England for the match against Denmark in February 2011 after impressing manager Fabio Capello with his calmness standing in for Schwarzer at Fulham. Stockdale was also called up for the UEFA Euro 2012 qualifier with Switzerland, however he withdrew from the squad and was replaced by Robert Green.

== Coaching career ==
Stockdale joined recently relegated Northern Premier League Premier Division club Blyth Spartans on 5 August 2024 as assistant to the newly appointed manager Nolberto Solano. Following Solano's sacking on 27 August, Stockdale acted as interim manager before being given the job permanently on 13 September. The club was sold in late October, and Stockdale was sacked after just 48 days in post.

On 12 February 2025, National League North club Farsley Celtic appointed Stockdale as their fourth manager of the season. With the club in dire financial straits and further relegated to the 9th tier, Stockdale agreed to purchase the club in June 2025. The deal was completed on 18 December 2025, and he stayed with the phoenix club FC Farsley as the original Farsley Celtic were liquidated.

== Personal life ==
Stockdale married his fiancée Kate on 3 June 2011, missing out on a place in the England squad for the Euro 2012 qualifier with Switzerland the following day.

== Career statistics ==
As of match played 9 December 2023

Appearances and goals by club, season and competition
Club	Season	League			FA Cup		League Cup		Other		Total	
Club	Season	Division	Apps	Goals	Apps	Goals	Apps	Goals	Apps	Goals	Apps	Goals
York City	2002–03	Third Division	1	0	0	0	0	0	0	0	1	0
York City	2003–04	Third Division	0	0	0	0	0	0	0	0	0	0
York City	2004–05	Conference National	21	0	1	0	—		1 (Note: Appearance in Football League Trophy)	0	23	0
York City	2005–06	Conference National	2	0	0	0	—		1 (Note: Appearance in FA Trophy)	0	3	0
York City	Total		24	0	1	0	0	0	2	0	27	0
Wakefield-Emley (loan)	2005–06	Northern Premier League; Premier Division	7	0	—		—		—		7	0
Worksop Town (loan)	2005–06	Conference North	6	0	—		—		—		6	0
Darlington	2006–07	League Two	6	0	0	0	2	0	0	0	8	0
Darlington	2007–08	League Two	41	0	2	0	1	0	2 (Note: Appearances in League Two play-offs)	0	46	0
Darlington	Total		47	0	2	0	3	0	2	0	54	0
Fulham	2008–09	Premier League	0	0	0	0	0	0	—		0	0
Fulham	2009–10	Premier League	1	0	0	0	1	0	1 (Note: Appearance in UEFA Europa League)	0	3	0
Fulham	2010–11	Premier League	7	0	2	0	1	0	—		10	0
Fulham	2011–12	Premier League	8	0	2	0	—		0	0	10	0
Fulham	2012–13	Premier League	2	0	1	0	0	0	—		3	0
Fulham	2013–14	Premier League	21	0	3	0	2	0	—		26	0
Fulham	Total		39	0	8	0	4	0	1	0	52	0
Rotherham United (loan)	2008–09	League Two	8	0	—		—		0	0	8	0
Leicester City (loan)	2008–09	League One	8	0	—		—		—		8	0
Plymouth Argyle (loan)	2009–10	Championship	21	0	—		—		—		21	0
Ipswich Town (loan)	2011–12	Championship	18	0	—		—		—		18	0
Hull City (loan)	2012–13	Championship	24	0	—		—		—		24	0
Brighton & Hove Albion	2014–15	Championship	42	0	2	0	2	0	—		46	0
Brighton & Hove Albion	2015–16	Championship	46	0	0	0	0	0	2 (Note: Appearances in Championship play-offs)	0	48	0
Brighton & Hove Albion	2016–17	Championship	45	0	0	0	0	0	—		45	0
Brighton & Hove Albion	Total		133	0	2	0	2	0	2	0	139	0
Birmingham City	2017–18	Championship	36	0	3	0	0	0	—		39	0
Birmingham City	2018–19	Championship	0	0	0	0	0	0	—		0	0
Birmingham City	2019–20	Championship	0	0	0	0	1	0	—		1	0
Birmingham City	Total		36	0	3	0	1	0	—		40	0
Southend United (loan)	2018–19	League One	3	0	—		—		—		3	0
Wycombe Wanderers (loan)	2018–19	League One	2	0	—		—		—		2	0
Coventry City (loan)	2018–19	League One	2	0	—		—		—		2	0
Wycombe Wanderers (loan)	2019–20	League One	2	0	—		—		0	0	2	0
Wycombe Wanderers	2020–21	Championship	17	0	0	0	0	0	—		17	0
Wycombe Wanderers	2021–22	League One	46	0	1	0	2	0	3 (Note: Appearances in League One play-offs)	0	52	0
Wycombe Wanderers	Total		65	0	1	0	2	0	3	0	71	0
Stevenage (loan)	2020–21	League Two	5	0	0	0	0	0	—		5	0
Sheffield Wednesday	2022–23	League One	24	0	2	0	1	0	0	0	27	0
York City	2023–24	National League	4	0	3	0	0	0	1 (Note: Appearance in FA Trophy)	0	8	0
Career total			476	0	22	0	13	0	11	0	522	0

== Honours ==
Hull City

- Football League Championship second-place promotion: 2012–13

Brighton & Hove Albion

- EFL Championship second-place promotion: 2016–17

Wycombe Wanderers

- EFL League One play-offs: 2020

Sheffield Wednesday

- EFL League One play-offs: 2023

Individual

- EFL Team of the Season: 2016–17
- PFA Team of the Year: 2016–17 Championship
- EFL League One Golden Glove: 2021–22
