= Georges Ehui =

Ivorian footballer

Personal information
- Full name: Kouadio Georges Ehui
- Date of birth: 2 February 1994 (age 32)
- Place of birth: Ivory Coast
- Height: 1.77 m (5 ft 10 in)
- Positions: Midfielder; defender

Team information
- Current team: Marlow

Youth career
- 2011–2012: Wycombe Wanderers

Senior career*
| Years | Team | Apps | (Gls) |
| 2012–2013 | Wycombe Wanderers | 2 | (0) |
| 2013 | → Eastbourne Borough (loan) | 4 | (0) |
| 2013 | Corby Town | 3 | (0) |
| 2013 | Wealdstone | 1 | (0) |
| 2014 | Margate | 4 | (0) |
| 2014–2015 | A.F.C. Hayes | 8 | (1) |
| 2015 | Hadley | 4 | (0) |
| 2015 | Burnham | ? | (0) |
| 2015–2016 | Northwood | 15 | (0) |
| 2016 | → Oxhey Jets (dual-registration) | 2 | (0) |
| 2016 | Aylesbury | 7 | (0) |
| 2016–2018 | Hanwell Town | 26 | (0) |
| 2018 | Egham Town | 13 | (0) |
| 2018–2019 | Chalfont St Peter | 13 | (0) |
| 2019 | Hertford Town | 7 | (1) |
| 2019–2021 | Waltham Abbey | ? | (?) |
| 2021– | Marlow | | |
- * Club domestic league appearances and goals as of 15:55, 23 September 2021 (UTC)

Kouadio Georges Ehui (born 2 February 1994) is an Ivorian footballer who plays as a midfielder for Marlow, having previously played for Wycombe Wanderers in Football League Two.

== Career ==
=== Wycombe Wanderers ===
Ehui started a two-year scholarship with Wycombe Wanderers in 2011. He finished his first year as a scholar and signed his first professional contract in July 2012. He made his professional debut on 24 November 2012, in a 3–0 victory over Burton Albion in Football League Two, coming on as a substitute for Josh Scowen. He made his second league appearance against Cheltenham Town. Ehui moved on loan to Eastbourne Borough in 2013, making four appearances.

=== Non-League moves ===
Ehui has since had spells with Corby Town, Wealdstone, Margate, A.F.C. Hayes, Hadley and Burnham. However, in late December 2015, Ehui signed for Northwood - joining up with his cousin Joakim. Incidentally, his other cousin Ismael also had a spell at Northwood between 2014 and 2015.

Ehui would leave Northwood in September 2016 to sign for league counterparts Aylesbury. In 2016, Ehui signed for fellow Southern League members Hanwell Town and later in the season signed for fellow Southern League team Egham Town.

Ehui has since had spells with Chalfont St Peter, Hertford Town, Waltham Abbey and Marlow.

== Personal life ==
Ehui's older cousins Ismael and Joakim are also footballers.
