= Brede Hangeland =

Norwegian footballer (born 1981)

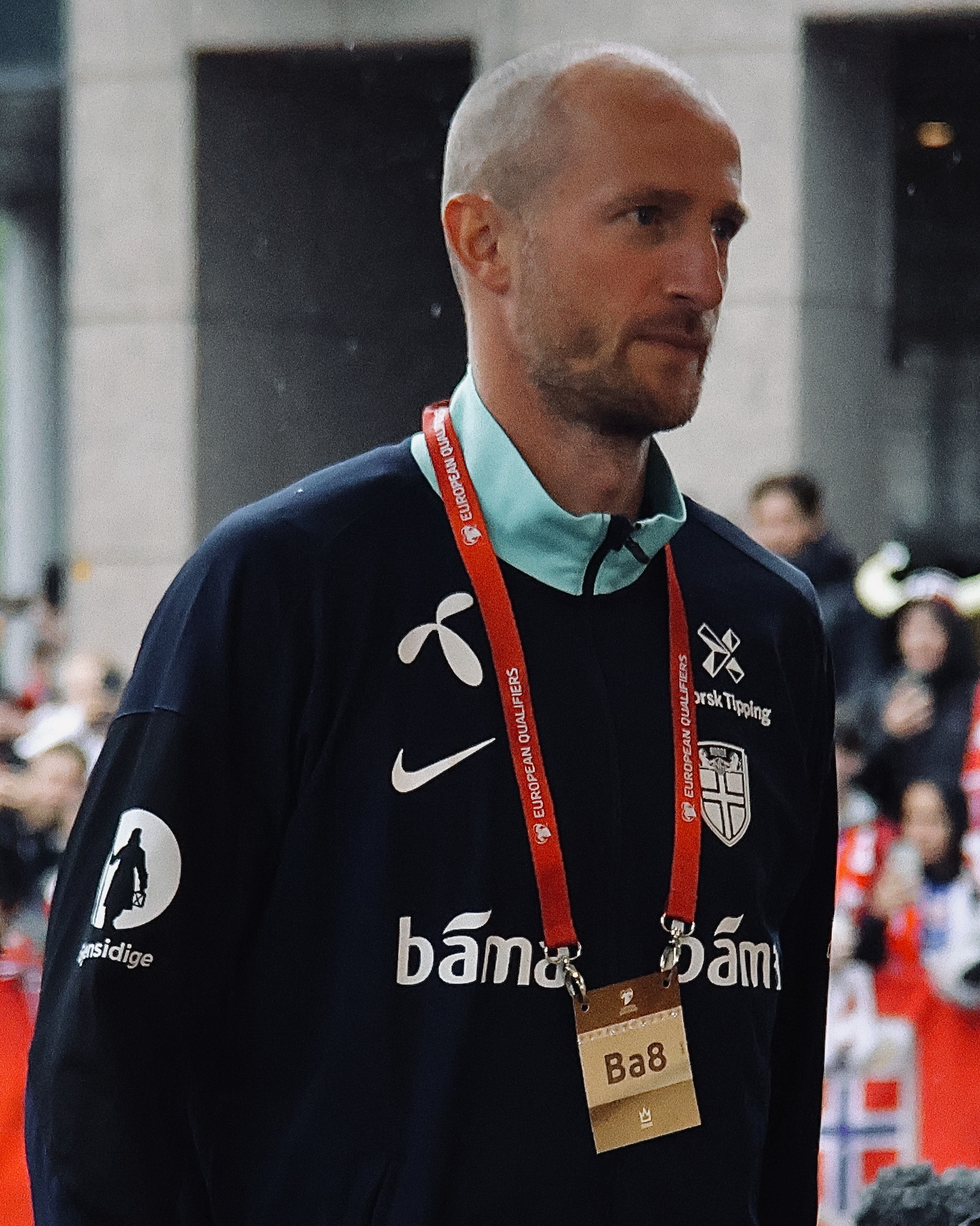
- Hangeland in 2025

Personal information
- Full name: Brede Paulsen Hangeland
- Date of birth: 20 June 1981 (age 45)
- Place of birth: Houston, Texas, United States
- Height: 1.95 m (6 ft 5 in)
- Position: Centre-back

Youth career
- 1998–2000: Vidar

Senior career*
| Years | Team | Apps | (Gls) |
| 2000–2005 | Viking | 114 | (6) |
| 2006–2008 | Copenhagen | 63 | (3) |
| 2008–2014 | Fulham | 217 | (8) |
| 2014–2016 | Crystal Palace | 21 | (2) |
| Total | | 415 | (19) |

International career
| 2001–2003 | Norway U21 | 12 | (0) |
| 2002–2014 | Norway | 91 | (4) |

Managerial career
- 2021–: Norway (Sports coordinator)
- * Club domestic league appearances and goals

Brede Paulsen Hangeland (Norwegian pronunciation: [ˈbrèːdə ˈhɑ̀ŋəlɑn]; born 20 June 1981) is a former professional footballer who played as a centre-back. Born in the United States, he represented the Norway national team.

He began his career with Viking, where he won the Norwegian Cup in 2001. In 2006, he moved to Copenhagen, and went on to win two Danish Superliga titles at the club. From 2008 to 2014 he played for Fulham, helping the team to the 2010 UEFA Europa League Final, but was released in 2014 after the club's relegation, subsequently joining Crystal Palace.

Hangeland played for the Norway national team between 2002 and 2014. He was the team captain from 2008 until his resignation, and in total he played 91 matches and scored four goals.

== Club career ==
=== Viking ===
The son of a Norwegian oil company worker, Hangeland was born in Houston, Texas during his parents' two-year spell in the United States, but grew up in Stavanger. Since moving back to Stavanger, Hangeland said on America, quoting: "We were there for a short period in 1980/81, which is when I was born and then we went back home, so obviously I don't remember too much about my time there!" Hangeland arrived at Viking from local club FK Vidar at the start of the 2001 season. He helped win the Norwegian cup in his debut season, playing as a central defensive midfielder in the 3–0 victory over rivals Bryne FK in the final. In 2005, he was made captain of Viking. When he left Viking he had played a total of 187 games for the club.

=== Copenhagen ===
On 16 January 2006, Hangeland signed a contract with the Danish club F.C. Copenhagen. The tall defender made an impact right from the start together with Danish captain Michael Gravgaard and the two defenders were feared. Because of their height and dominance when it came to headers, they were known as the Copenhagen Air Force. With several great performances in the 2006–07 UEFA Champions League group stage Brede Hangeland was linked with numerous big clubs around Europe. During his time at Copenhagen, Hangeland won the Danish Superliga twice and the Royal League once. He played in 63 league games, scoring three times and total played over 100 games in the different tournaments.

=== Fulham ===
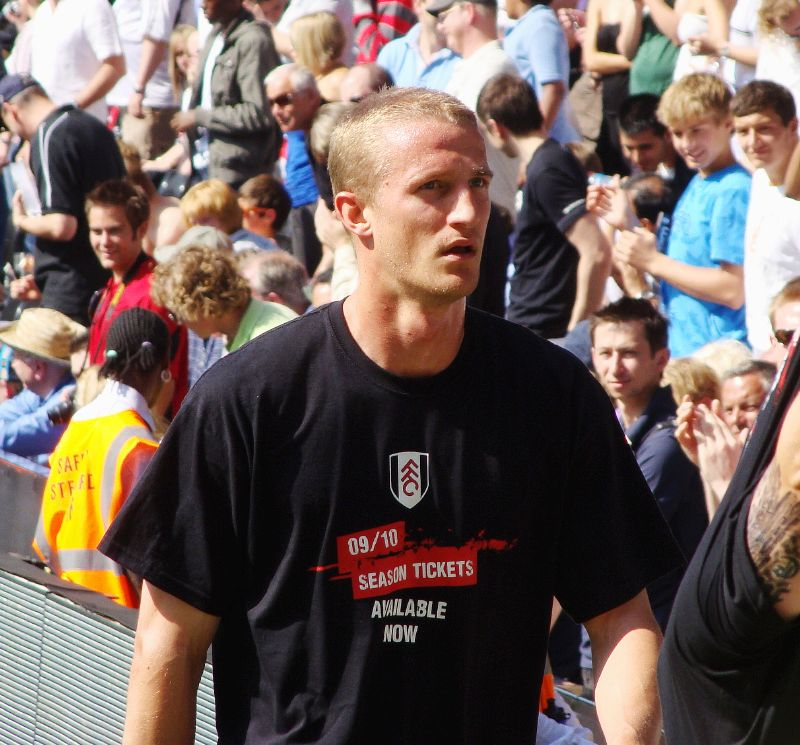
Hangeland with Fulham in 2009

During the summer of 2007 newspapers linked him with Premier League clubs Newcastle United, Liverpool, Aston Villa and Manchester City. Hangeland refuted the rumours and said he was glad to play for Copenhagen, but finally on 18 January 2008 after days of speculation, it was officially confirmed that he had signed for Fulham, where he was reunited with his former manager from Viking, Roy Hodgson, and former Viking FK striker Erik Nevland.

On 29 January 2008, he made his Fulham debut when Fulham played Bolton Wanderers at Reebok Stadium. He was voted Man of the Match by Sky Sports after the game. The club survived relegation in the 2007–08 season with Hangeland forming a formidable partnership with Aaron Hughes at the heart of Fulham's defence.

Hangeland was appointed captain of the Norway national team on 12 August 2008, and on 23 August he scored his first goal for Fulham against Arsenal, with Fulham winning the game 1–0.

During the summer of 2009, media reports linked him to Arsenal, but Hangeland indicated that he was happy to remain at Fulham. On 22 October, he scored his second goal for Fulham in the Europe League match against A.S. Roma.

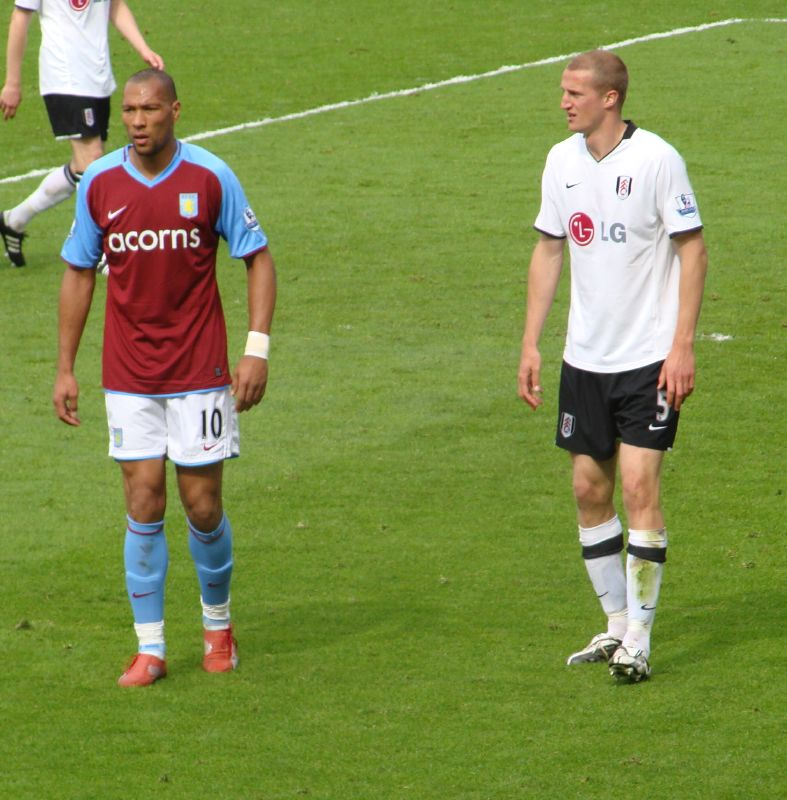
Hangeland marking fellow Norwegian John Carew of Aston Villa in April 2009

On 27 November 2009, Hangeland was rewarded with a new deal with Fulham to last until the summer of 2013. He played in the UEFA Cup Final on 12 May 2010, which Fulham lost 2–1 after extra time to Atlético Madrid in Hamburg.

Hangeland scored two goals in an away win at Birmingham City on 15 May 2011. This took his tally up to six Premier League goals on the season which made him the highest scoring centre back in the league, and the second highest goalscorer for Fulham behind Clint Dempsey.

Hangeland signed a two-year contract extension with the option of a further year on 28 March 2013, which would have kept him at the club until the summer of 2015. However, on 3 June 2014, Hangeland was released by Fulham. Through his advisor, Hangeland released a statement saying that he had been dismissed by e-mail, without having talked to anyone in the club about the future or his contract. This was countered by the club who noted "personal protocol was followed and that Brede Hangeland was notified in the right way".

Months later, when Felix Magath was sacked as Fulham manager, Hangeland claimed after his sacking that in the previous season Magath ignored doctors and instructed him to place a block of cheese on his thigh in order to make him fit for the next match. Magath stated that Hangeland did not have a thigh injury but an inflammation of the knee, and that he suggested the additional use of an alternative treatment with a bandage (dressing) consisting of Quark. Fulham player Sascha Riether later that the story was greatly exaggerated and that Magath had suggested he use a traditional topfen curd.

=== Crystal Palace ===
On 1 August 2014, Hangeland joined Crystal Palace on a free transfer, signing a one-year deal. On the 16th, he made his competitive debut for the club, on the opening day of the Premier League season away to Arsenal. Hangeland opened the scoring by heading in Jason Puncheon's corner, but Palace eventually lost 2–1. He scored twice in 17 appearances as Palace finished the season in 10th place under Alan Pardew.

On 10 June 2015, it was announced that Hangeland had been released by Crystal Palace but he signed a new one-year extension on 15 June, keeping him at the club for another season. However, at the end of the 2015–16 season Hangeland was again released by Crystal Palace.

Hangeland announced his retirement from professional football on 5 August 2016.

== International career ==
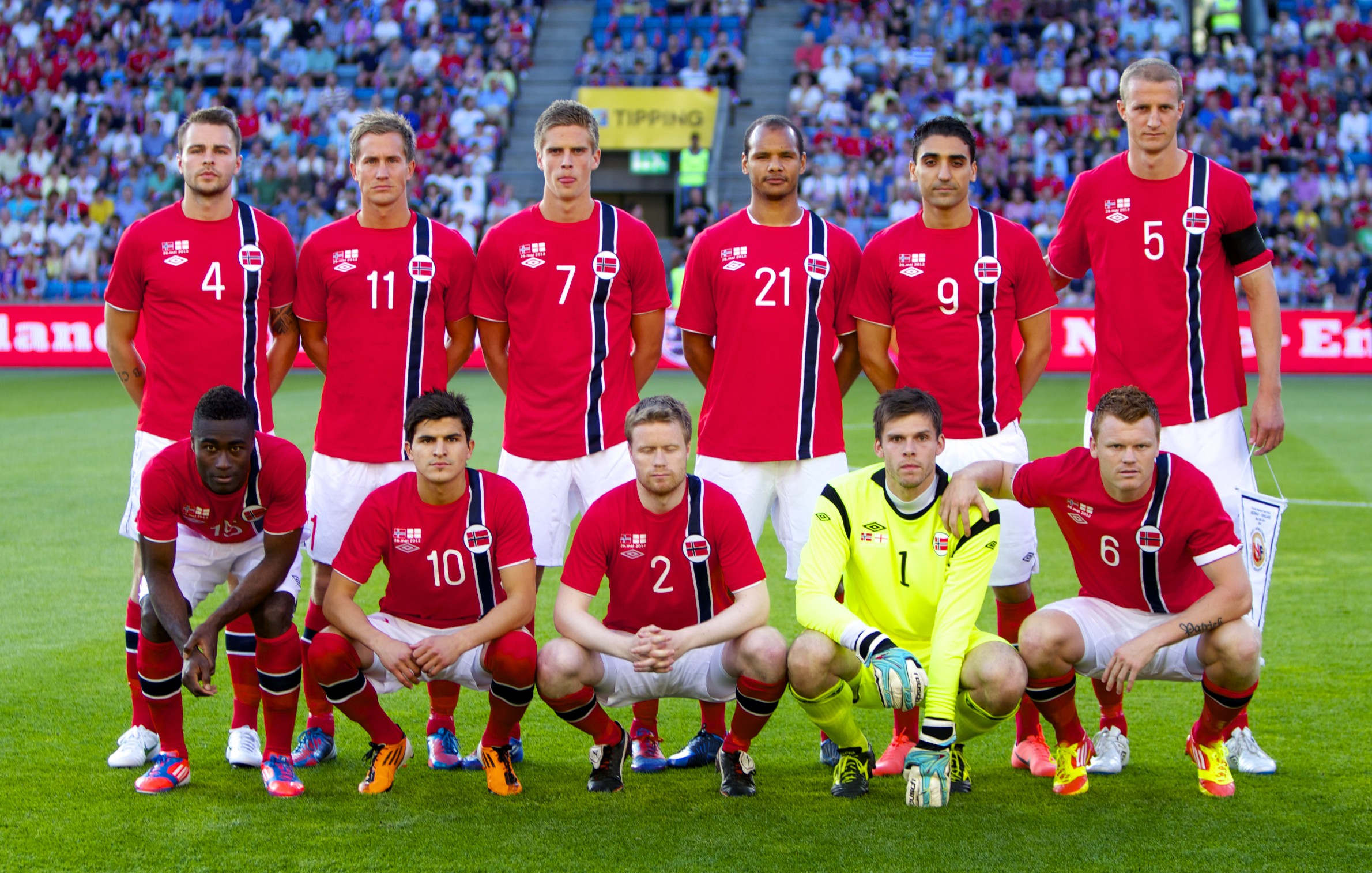
Hangeland (back, furthest right) lining up as captain of Norway in 2012

Born in Houston in the United States, Hangeland was eligible to represent the US national team and the Norway national team.

After playing 12 matches on the Norway under-21 national team, Hangeland made his debut for the senior national team as a defensive midfielder in a 1–0 win against Austria on 20 November 2002. After the UEFA Euro 2008 qualifying, national team coach Åge Hareide named him as captain instead of Vålerenga's player-coach Martin Andresen. Hangeland's first goal came in his 62nd match; a UEFA Euro 2012 qualifying match against Iceland. He was capped 91 times, 48 of them as captain, and scored four goals for the Norway national team.

== Personal life ==
When Hangeland married Celin Trana in 2009, rather than giving presents, guests were asked to contribute to a Save the Children project to build a school in Cambodia. Around £45,000 was raised.

== Career statistics ==
=== Club ===
Appearances and goals by club, season and competition
| Club | Season | League | | | National cup (Note: Includes Norwegian Cup, Danish Cup, FA Cup) | | League cup (Note: Includes Football League Cup) | | Continental | | Total | |
| Club | Season | Division | Apps | Goals | Apps | Goals | Apps | Goals | Apps | Goals | Apps | Goals |
|---|---|---|---|---|---|---|---|---|---|---|---|---|
| Viking | 2001 | Tippeligaen | 22 | 0 | 7 | 0 | – | | 4 | 0 | 33 | 0 |
| Viking | 2002 | Tippeligaen | 26 | 2 | 7 | 0 | – | | 4 | 0 | 41 | 2 |
| Viking | 2003 | Tippeligaen | 26 | 1 | 6 | 0 | – | | – | | 32 | 1 |
| Viking | 2004 | Tippeligaen | 14 | 3 | 0 | 0 | – | | – | | 14 | 3 |
| Viking | 2005 | Tippeligaen | 26 | 0 | 3 | 0 | – | | 10 | 0 | 39 | 0 |
| Viking | Total | | 114 | 6 | 23 | 0 | – | | 18 | 0 | 155 | 6 |
| Copenhagen | 2005–06 | Danish Superliga | 13 | 1 | 1 | 0 | – | | 0 | 0 | 14 | 1 |
| Copenhagen | 2006–07 | Danish Superliga | 32 | 0 | 6 | 1 | – | | 10 (Note: Appearances in UEFA Champions League) | 1 | 48 | 2 |
| Copenhagen | 2007–08 | Danish Superliga | 18 | 2 | 2 | 0 | – | | 9 | 0 | 29 | 2 |
| Copenhagen | Total | | 63 | 3 | 9 | 1 | – | | 19 | 1 | 91 | 5 |
| Fulham | 2007–08 | Premier League | 15 | 0 | 0 | 0 | 0 | 0 | – | | 15 | 0 |
| Fulham | 2008–09 | Premier League | 37 | 1 | 5 | 0 | 1 | 0 | – | | 43 | 1 |
| Fulham | 2009–10 | Premier League | 32 | 1 | 4 | 0 | 0 | 0 | 16 (Note: Appearances in UEFA Europa League) | 2 | 52 | 3 |
| Fulham | 2010–11 | Premier League | 37 | 6 | 3 | 1 | 2 | 0 | – | | 42 | 7 |
| Fulham | 2011–12 | Premier League | 38 | 0 | 2 | 0 | 0 | 0 | 14 | 0 | 54 | 0 |
| Fulham | 2012–13 | Premier League | 35 | 0 | 3 | 1 | 1 | 0 | – | | 39 | 1 |
| Fulham | 2013–14 | Premier League | 23 | 0 | 1 | 0 | 1 | 0 | – | | 25 | 0 |
| Fulham | Total | | 217 | 8 | 18 | 2 | 5 | 0 | 30 | 2 | 270 | 12 |
| Crystal Palace | 2014–15 | Premier League | 14 | 2 | 0 | 0 | 2 | 0 | – | | 16 | 2 |
| Crystal Palace | 2015–16 | Premier League | 7 | 0 | 0 | 0 | 2 | 0 | – | | 9 | 0 |
| Crystal Palace | Total | | 21 | 2 | 0 | 0 | 4 | 0 | – | | 25 | 2 |
| Career total | | | 415 | 19 | 50 | 3 | 9 | 0 | 67 | 3 | 541 | 25 |

=== International ===
Appearances and goals by national team and year
| National team | Year | Apps | Goals |
|---|---|---|---|
| Norway | 2002 | 1 | 0 |
| Norway | 2003 | 7 | 0 |
| Norway | 2004 | 6 | 0 |
| Norway | 2005 | 7 | 0 |
| Norway | 2006 | 9 | 0 |
| Norway | 2007 | 11 | 0 |
| Norway | 2008 | 8 | 0 |
| Norway | 2009 | 8 | 0 |
| Norway | 2010 | 9 | 1 |
| Norway | 2011 | 7 | 0 |
| Norway | 2012 | 8 | 3 |
| Norway | 2013 | 8 | 0 |
| Norway | 2014 | 2 | 0 |
| Total | | 91 | 4 |

Scores and results list Norway's goal tally first, score column indicates score after each Hangeland goal.

List of international goals scored by Brede Hangeland
| No. | Date | Venue | Opponent | Score | Result | Competition |
|---|---|---|---|---|---|---|
| 1 | 3 September 2010 | Laugardalsvöllur, Reykjavík, Iceland | Iceland | 2–1 | 2–1 | UEFA Euro 2012 qualifier |
| 2 | 15 August 2012 | Ullevaal Stadion, Oslo, Norway | Greece | 1–2 | 2–3 | Friendly |
| 3 | 12 October 2012 | Stade de Suisse, Bern, Switzerland | Switzerland | 1–1 | 1–1 | 2014 FIFA World Cup qualification |
| 4 | 16 October 2012 | Antonis Papadopoulos Stadium, Larnaca, Cyprus | Cyprus | 1–1 | 3–1 | 2014 FIFA World Cup qualification |

== Honours ==
Viking

- Norwegian Cup: 2001

FC Copenhagen

- Danish Superliga: 2005–06, 2006–07
- Royal League: 2005–06

Fulham

- UEFA Europa League runner-up: 2009–10

Individual

- Kniksen of the Year: 2009, 2012
