= Ismael Ehui =

French footballer (born 1986)

Personal information
- Full name: Ismaël Ehui
- Date of birth: 10 December 1986 (age 39)
- Place of birth: Lille, France
- Height: 5 ft 8 in (1.73 m)
- Position: Striker

Senior career*
Years	Team	Apps	(Gls)
2004–2008	Fulham	0	(0)
2006	→ Scunthorpe United (loan)	3	(0)
2008	→ Carshalton Athletic (loan)	2	(3)
2008	Harrow Borough		
2008–2009	Ermis Aradippou		
2009–??	R.R.F.C. Montegnée	41	(30)
2014–2015	Northwood	25	(10)
2015–2016	Hayes & Yeading United	33	(9)
2015–2016	→ Hendon (dual-registration)	1	(1)
2016	→ Flackwell Heath (dual-registration)		
2016–2017	Northwood	9	(1)
2017	Chalfont St Peter	12	(0)
2017–2018	Hayes & Yeading United	26	(11)
2018	Potters Bar Town	3	(0)
2018	Hanwell Town	3	(0)
2018	North Greenford United	2	(0)
2018–2019	Chalfont St Peter	6	(0)
2019–2021	Broadfields United	13	(2)
2021–2022	Northwood	8	(1)
- * Club domestic league appearances and goals as of 24 March 2022

Ismaël Ehui (born 10 December 1986) is a French footballer who plays as a striker. He played in the Football League for Scunthorpe United.

== Career ==
Ismael signed a two-year professional contract at Fulham football club after being prolific in front of goal for the youth and reserve team, he then signed a one-year extension. In late February 2006, Ehui joined Football League One side Scunthorpe United on loan to gain vital experience, and to also help them with their survival in League One. He made his debut for the Iron coming on as a second-half substitute in their 3–1 away win at Gillingham. In March 2008, Ehui joined Isthmian League Premier Division side Carshalton Athletic on loan for the rest of the season to assist in their relegation fight. He made an immediate impact with the club, scoring three goals in his first two games and also winning a penalty to set up another. After his release from Fulham in 2008, he then joined Harrow Borough where he had a brief spell. In June 2009 he left Ermis Aradippou to sign with Belgian provincial team R.R.F.C. Montegnée.

Ehui signed for Southern League Division One Central side Northwood in September 2014, joining his younger brother Joakim at the club, but left in the summer of 2015.

After leaving Northwood, Ehui signed for Conference South side Hayes & Yeading United on 3 August 2015, after impressing in pre-season. Ehui later joined Isthmian League side Hendon on dual-registration in December 2015. He later had a short spell with Flackwell Heath before rejoining Northwood in September 2016.

Ehui has since had spells with Chalfont St Peter, Potters Bar Town, Hanwell Town, North Greenford United and Broadfields United. He then returned for a short third spell at Northwood between 2021 and 2022, before departing the club. He also returned for a short spell at Broadfields United.

== Personal life ==
Ehui's younger brother Joakim and cousin Georges are also footballers.
