= Adam Watts (footballer) =

English footballer

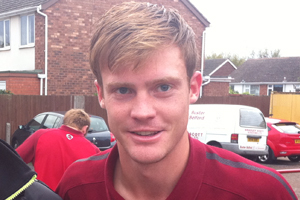

Personal information
- Full name: Adam James Watts
- Date of birth: 4 March 1988 (age 38)
- Place of birth: Hackney, England
- Height: 6 ft 2 in (1.88 m)
- Position: Defender

Youth career
- ?–2007: Fulham

Senior career*
Years	Team	Apps	(Gls)
2007–2010	Fulham	0	(0)
2007	→ Milton Keynes Dons (loan)	2	(0)
2009	→ Northampton Town (loan)	5	(0)
2009	→ Lincoln City (loan)	10	(0)
2010–2011	Lincoln City	59	(1)
2012	Gainsborough Trinity	8	(0)
2012–2015	Eastbourne Borough	93	(5)
Total		177	(6)

International career
2004	England U17	4	(0)
- * Club domestic league appearances and goals

Adam James Watts (born 4 March 1988) is an English former professional footballer who played as a defender.

He came through the youth academy at Fulham before going on to play in the Football League for Milton Keynes Dons, Northampton Town and Lincoln City. He ended his career in non-league football with spells at Gainsborough Trinity and Eastbourne Borough.

== Career ==
=== Fulham ===
Watts began his professional career at Fulham; however, he never went on to make a first team appearance for Fulham. In 2007, Watts signed his first professional contract with Fulham. Yet, in the League Cup match against Shrewsbury Town, he was an unused substitute. He made a league appearance during a loan spell with Milton Keynes Dons in Football League Two. On 10 September 2008, Watts signed a new contract with Fulham that will keep him at the club until the summer of 2010. In April 2009 he signed for League One side Northampton Town, on loan until the end of the season. He made a handful of appearances, but could not prevent Northampton being relegated, before he returned to Fulham. After starting the 2009/10 season in Fulham's first team squad, making the bench against CSKA Sofia and Manchester City, he departed the club.

=== Lincoln City ===
On 2 October 2009 he agreed to join Lincoln City on an initial month's loan, becoming newly installed managed Chris Sutton's first signing for the club. He made his debut in the club's 1–0 home victory over Aldershot Town the following day and, after helping his side to two clean sheets in his first two games, his loan was extended until 2 January 2010. Having impressed during his loan period, on 31 December 2009 the club announced that Watts had agreed terms on a permanent contract with the Imps that will run until the summer of 2012, joining for an undisclosed fee; the paperwork being completed on 5 January 2010. On 20 February 2010 his season was ended when he suffered a fracture of his left fibula in the 2–2 draw at Grimsby Town, the injury seeing him undergo surgery to pin the fracture. The following season, he returned to the side and scored his first and only goal for the club in a 4–3 win at Stockport County.

In May 2011, he was made available on a free transfer by the club, after a mass clear out of players following relegation from the Football League. On 27 December 2011 he departed Sincil Bank by mutual consent.

=== Gainsborough Trinity ===
Watts signed with Conference North side Gainsborough Trinity on 6 January 2012 He was amongst the Trinity side that missed out on promotion to the Conference National after defeat to Nuneaton Town in the play-off final. He was released with three other players on 18 May 2012.

=== Eastbourne Borough ===
Watts signed for Eastbourne Borough of the Conference South in October 2012. He received the Manager's player and the Player's player of the year awards in his first season at the club, making 29 appearances in all competitions (26 league). On 26 November 2015, he decided to take a break from the game to allow himself to recover from recurring injury problems.

== International career ==
Watts made four appearances for the England under-17 side in 2004, playing in the Nordic Cup.

== Career statistics ==
Appearances and goals by club, season and competition
Club	Season	League			FA Cup		League Cup		Other		Total	
Club	Season	Division	Apps	Goals	Apps	Goals	Apps	Goals	Apps	Goals	Apps	Goals
Fulham	2006–07	Premier League	0	0	0	0	0	0	0	0	0	0
→ Milton Keynes (loan)	2006–07	League Two	2	0	0	0	0	0	0	0	2	0
Fulham	2007–08	Premier League	0	0	0	0	0	0	0	0	0	0
Fulham	2008–09	Premier League	0	0	0	0	0	0	0	0	0	0
→ Northampton Town (loan)	2008–09	League One	5	0	0	0	0	0	0	0	5	0
→ Lincoln City (loan)	2009–10	League Two	10	0	2	0	0	0	0	0	12	0
Total			17	0	2	0	0	0	0	0	19	0
Lincoln City	2009–10	League Two	8	0	0	0	0	0	0	0	8	0
Lincoln City	2010–11	League Two	40	1	2	0	1	0	1 (Note: Appearance(s) in Football League Trophy)	0	44	1
Lincoln City	2011–12	Conference Premier	11	0	0	0	0	0	0	0	11	0
Total			59	1	2	0	1	0	1	0	63	1
Gainsborough Trinity	2011–12	Conference North	8	0	0	0	0	0	0	0	8	0
Total			8	0	0	0	0	0	0	0	8	0
Eastbourne Borough	2012–13	Conference South	26	1	0	0	0	0	0	0	26	1
Eastbourne Borough	2013–14	Conference South	38	1	0	0	0	0	0	0	38	1
Eastbourne Borough	2014–15	Conference South	20	3	0	0	0	0	0	0	20	3
Eastbourne Borough	2015–16	National League South	9	0	0	0	0	0	0	0	9	0
Total			93	5	0	0	0	0	0	0	93	5
Career total			177	6	4	0	1	0	1	0	183	6
