= 2007–08 Fulham F.C. season =

Fulham F.C.
2007–08 season
- Manager: Lawrie Sanchez (until December); Roy Hodgson (from December)
- Stadium: Craven Cottage
- Premier League: 17th
- FA Cup: Third round
- League Cup: Third round
- Top goalscorer: League: Clint Dempsey (6); All: Clint Dempsey; David Healy; Diomansy Kamara; Danny Murphy (6)
- Highest home attendance: 25,357 (vs. Chelsea, 1 January)
- Lowest home attendance: 10,500 (vs. Bolton Wanderers, 26 September)
Home colours	Away colours	Third colours

The 2007–08 season was Fulham F.C.'s seventh consecutive season in the Premier League. Lawrie Sanchez was in charge of the club for the first few months of the season after taking charge at the end of the previous campaign, but left the club by mutual consent in December 2007 after a string of poor results had sent Fulham sliding towards the relegation zone. He was replaced by ex-Finland national team coach Roy Hodgson, who had previously been in charge of fellow Premier League side Blackburn Rovers amongst many other clubs around Europe. Fulham managed to save themselves from relegation to the Championship with a 1–0 away win against Portsmouth at Fratton Park, their third-straight away victory, despite wins for relegation rivals Reading and Birmingham City, staying up on goal difference.

== Season review ==
=== August ===
Fulham almost started the season off perfectly when they went ahead against Arsenal through a David Healy goal after one minute during the first weekend of the season, but Arsenal won the game in the last ten minutes with goals from Robin van Persie and Alexander Hleb. Fulham, however, did win their first home match of the season in a midweek match against Bolton Wanderers with goals from Healy and Alexey Smertin (later confirmed as a Gerald Cid own goal), having come from behind after ex-Fulham striker Heiðar Helguson's early goal. It would be several months before Fulham would experience another league victory.

In their third game of the season, Fulham again experienced a turnaround, but this time the scoreline went against them. They were 1–0 up against Middlesbrough – Brian McBride scoring before being carried off injured – but they could not hold on to their lead and lost 2–1. There was controversy about the result because, in the last minute, Healy had a clear goal not given as the referee or linesman could not see that the ball had crossed the line.

The final league game of the month was against Aston Villa; for a fourth game in succession, the team scoring the first goal failed to win. Fulham scored through Healy after six minutes, but two second half goals from former Fulham defender Zat Knight and Shaun Maloney gave Villa the victory.

=== September ===
After three agonising defeats in their first four games, Fulham felt that they deserved some luck; this came in the first game of September against Tottenham Hotspur. Younès Kaboul and Dimitar Berbatov had put Tottenham in cruise control with two first goals before Dempsey replied for Fulham just before half-time. Gareth Bale extended Tottenham's lead on 61 minutes to 3–1 but Fulham managed to snatch a draw. Alexey Smertin's 77th-minute goal (also confirmed as an own goal, this time by Ricardo Rocha) and Diomansy Kamara's bicycle kick in stoppage time gave Fulham a 3–3 draw.

In the next game, away to Wigan Athletic, it was the opposition that rescued the game late on. Dempsey gave Fulham the lead but Jason Koumas scored a penalty 10 minutes from time after Hamer Bouazza's foul on Mario Melchiot to give Wigan a point. Another two draws followed in September: firstly a 3–3 draw against Manchester City, throwing away a lead twice before having to eventually come from behind (Hamer Bouazza, Simon Davies and Danny Murphy scoring for Fulham, with the City goals coming from Martin Petrov and Émile Mpenza). They followed that up by holding Chelsea to a 0–0 at Stamford Bridge.

In the League Cup, Fulham suffered a 2–1 home defeat to Bolton.

=== October ===
Fulham started October with a home defeat against Portsmouth, through deflected strikes by Benjani and Hermann Hreiðarsson. A week later, against Derby County, Fulham had their second goalless draw of the season in a game of few chances, although in truth Derby could have snatched the win.

The final game of the month saw Fulham throw away yet another lead with a 1–1 draw against Sunderland. Simon Davies gave Fulham the lead in the first half and they held out until the 86th minute, when Kenwyne Jones was in the right place to score an equaliser for Sunderland.

=== November ===
Fulham started November with a 3–1 home victory against Reading. Simon Davies put Fulham in front after 18 minutes. Kevin Doyle equalised ten minutes after the break, but Fulham struck back with goals from Clint Dempsey and David Healy. Elliott Omozusi was sent off in injury time, in only his second appearance, for a second yellow card. Fulham were unlucky to lose in their next game away at Liverpool as Fernando Torres and Steven Gerrard both scored in the last ten minutes for a 2–0 victory. It was very harsh on Fulham, who had resisted the Liverpool pressure for the majority of the game.

After the international break, Fulham drew 2–2 with Blackburn Rovers, having twice been in front through goals from Danny Murphy and Diomansy Kamara, only to be pegged back by Brett Emerton and Stephen Warnock.

=== December ===
December was a busy month, with matches crammed together at the end of the month. It turned out to be a very unsuccessful period for Fulham, as they took just two points from a possible 18. The home defeat to Newcastle United spelt the end for manager Lawrie Sanchez; first-team coach Ray Lewington took charge of the following three fixtures prior to the permanent appointment of Roy Hodgson at the end of the month.

=== January ===
On Hodgson's first match in charge, Fulham were defeated by close rivals Chelsea 2–1 at Craven Cottage.

=== April ===
April started with a 3–1 defeat at home against Sunderland with second half goals from Danny Collins, Michael Chopra and Kenwyne Jones, even though Fulham had equalised through a brilliant David Healy goal from 30 yards out. Things improved the next week though as Fulham finally recorded their first away win since beating Newcastle United in September 2006, against Reading at the Madejski Stadium. Brian McBride and Erik Nevland scored the goals. It came as some relief to the long-suffering away support and put Fulham's survival bid back on track. However, Fulham then suffered a home defeat against an under-strength Liverpool side, Jermaine Pennant and Peter Crouch scoring for Liverpool. This defeat meant for most Fulham fans that relegation was looking almost certain; if results would not go their way the following week, then they could be relegated.

The following week, Fulham gained a priceless three points away to Manchester City to record their second successive away victory. After falling behind 2–0 in the first half, Fulham fought back from mathematical relegation to score three goals in the last twenty minutes, culminating with a 92nd-minute goal by Diomansy Kamara, his second of the game.

=== May ===
On 3 May, Fulham were able to pull themselves out of the drop zone as Reading lost to Tottenham, and Fulham earned a vital three points with a win against Birmingham, one point above Fulham in the league table. This sent Birmingham to 19th position and Reading to 18th position, as Fulham leapfrogged both to 17th position on goal difference. Fulham's Premier League survival was in their own hands going into the last game of the season; both Reading and Birmingham registered big wins, but Fulham survived on goal difference with a 1–0 victory away to Portsmouth.

== Players ==
=== First-team squad ===
Note: Flags indicate national team as defined under FIFA eligibility rules; some limited exceptions apply. Players may hold more than one non-FIFA nationality.

No.	Pos.	Nation	Player
1	GK	USA	Kasey Keller
2	DF	GER	Moritz Volz
3	DF	USA	Carlos Bocanegra
4	DF	ENG	Paul Konchesky
5	DF	FRA	Philippe Christanval
6	DF	SRB	Dejan Stefanović
7	MF	KOR	Seol Ki-hyeon
8	MF	RUS	Alexey Smertin
9	FW	NIR	David Healy
10	FW	FIN	Jari Litmanen
11	FW	SEN	Diomansy Kamara (Note: Kamara was born in Paris, France, but also qualified to represent Senegal internationally and made his international debut for Senegal in 2003.)
12	GK	TTO	Tony Warner (Note: Warner was born in Liverpool, England, but also qualified to represent Trinidad and Tobago internationally and made his international debut for Trinidad and Tobago in February 2006.)
13	GK	POR	Ricardo Batista
14	FW	USA	Eddie Johnson
15	FW	NOR	Erik Nevland
16	MF	IRL	Michael Timlin (Note: Timlin was born in Peckham, England, but also qualified to represent the Republic of Ireland internationally and represented them at U-17 and U-21 level.)
17	DF	CAN	Paul Stalteri (on loan from Tottenham Hotspur)
18	DF	NIR	Aaron Hughes

No.	Pos.	Nation	Player
20	FW	USA	Brian McBride (captain)
21	MF	ENG	Jimmy Bullard
22	DF	ENG	Elliot Omozusi
23	MF	USA	Clint Dempsey
24	FW	ALG	Hamer Bouazza (Note: Bouazza was born in Évry, France, but also qualified to represent Algeria internationally through his parents and made his international debut for Algeria in February 2007.)
25	MF	WAL	Simon Davies
26	MF	DEN	Leon Andreasen
27	MF	ENG	Danny Murphy
28	MF	ENG	Robert Milsom
29	GK	FIN	Antti Niemi
31	DF	ENG	Adam Watts
32	DF	NOR	Brede Hangeland (Note: Hangeland was born in Houston, Texas, United States, but was raised in Norway from the age of 1 and made his international debut for Norway in November 2002.)
33	DF	FIN	Toni Kallio
34	DF	NIR	Chris Baird
35	MF	NZL	Simon Elliott
37	DF	AUS	Adrian Leijer
38	DF	ENG	Nathan Ashton

=== Left club during season ===
Note: Flags indicate national team as defined under FIFA eligibility rules; some limited exceptions apply. Players may hold more than one non-FIFA nationality.

No.	Pos.	Nation	Player
6	DF	ENG	Zat Knight (to Aston Villa)
7	DF	ENG	Liam Rosenior (to Reading)
10	MF	NIR	Steven Davis (on loan to Rangers)
14	MF	SEN	Papa Bouba Diop (to Portsmouth)

No.	Pos.	Nation	Player
14	FW	FIN	Shefki Kuqi (Note: Kuqi was born in Vushtrri, SFR Yugoslavia (now Kosovo), but was raised in Finland and made his international debut for Finland in August 1999.) (on loan from Crystal Palace)
15	FW	NED	Collins John (Note: John was born in Zwedru, Liberia, but was raised in the Netherlands and made his international debut for the Netherlands in August 2004.) (on loan to Watford)
17	MF	ENG	Lee Cook (on loan to Charlton Athletic)

== Transfers ==
=== Summer ===
==== In ====
Date	Pos.	Name	From	Fee
27 June 2007	DF	(Northern Ireland) Aaron Hughes	(England) Aston Villa	£1,000,000
5 July 2007	MF	(Northern Ireland) Steven Davis	(England) Aston Villa	£4,000,000
9 July 2007	FW	(Senegal) Diomansy Kamara	(England) West Bromwich Albion	£6,000,000
12 July 2007	DF	(Northern Ireland) Chris Baird	(England) Southampton	£3,035,000
13 July 2007	FW	(Northern Ireland) David Healy	(England) Leeds United	£1,500,000
13 July 2007	DF	(England) Paul Konchesky	(England) West Ham United	£3,250,000
19 July 2007	MF	(England) Lee Cook	(England) Queens Park Rangers	£2,500,000
4 August 2007	MF	(Australia) Adrian Leijer	(Australia) Melbourne Victory	Undisclosed
8 August 2007	DF	(Algeria) Hamer Bouazza	(England) Watford	£3,000,000
23 August 2007	GK	(United States) Kasey Keller	(Germany) Borussia Mönchengladbach	Free
30 August 2007	DF	(England) Nathan Ashton	Unattached	Free
31 August 2007	FW	(Finland) Shefki Kuqi	(England) Crystal Palace	Loan
31 August 2007	MF	(England) Danny Murphy	(England) Tottenham Hotspur	Loan
31 August 2007	MF	(South Korea) Seol Ki-hyeon	(England) Reading	Undisclosed
31 August 2007	DF	(Serbia) Dejan Stefanović	(England) Portsmouth	£1,000,000

==== Out ====
Date	Pos.	Name	To	Fee
14 June 2007	GK	(Wales) Mark Crossley (Note: Crossley was born in Barnsley, England, and represented them at U-21 level, but also qualified to represent Wales internationally through a grandparent and made his international debut for Wales in February 1997.)	(England) Oldham Athletic	Free
1 July 2007	MF	(Wales) Matthew Collins	(Wales) Swansea City	Free
23 July 2007	FW	(Iceland) Heiðar Helguson	(England) Bolton Wanderers	Undisclosed
31 July 2007	MF	(England) Michael Brown	(England) Wigan Athletic	Undisclosed
3 August 2007	DF	(France) Franck Queudrue	(England) Birmingham City	£2,000,000
29 August 2007	DF	(England) Zat Knight	(England) Aston Villa	£3,500,000
31 August 2007	MF	(Senegal) Papa Bouba Diop	(England) Portsmouth	Undisclosed
31 August 2007	DF	(England) Liam Rosenior	(England) Reading	Undisclosed

=== Winter ===
==== In ====
Date	Pos.	Name	From	Fee
18 January 2008	DF	(Norway) Brede Hangeland	(Denmark) Copenhagen	Undisclosed
22 January 2008	DF	(Denmark) Leon Andreasen	(Germany) Werder Bremen	Undisclosed
23 January 2008	FW	(United States) Eddie Johnson	(United States) Kansas City Wizards	Undisclosed
28 January 2008	FW	(Norway) Erik Nevland	(Netherlands) Groningen	£1,850,000
31 January 2008	DF	(Finland) Toni Kallio	(Switzerland) Young Boys	Undisclosed
31 January 2008	FW	(Finland) Jari Litmanen	(Sweden) Malmö FF	Free
31 January 2008	DF	(Canada) Paul Stalteri	(England) Tottenham Hotspur	Loan

=== Out on loan ===
Note: Flags indicate national team as defined under FIFA eligibility rules; some limited exceptions apply. Players may hold more than one non-FIFA nationality.

No.	Pos.	Nation	Player
12	GK	TTO	Tony Warner (on loan to Barnsley)
16	MF	IRL	Michael Timlin (on loan to Swindon Town)
19	DF	ENG	Ian Pearce (on loan to Southampton)
28	MF	ENG	Robert Milsom (on loan to Brentford)
30	MF	ENG	Wayne Brown (on loan to Brentford)
38	MF	ENG	Nathan Ashton (on loan to Crystal Palace)

No.	Pos.	Nation	Player
—	DF	ENG	TJ Moncur (on loan to Bradford City)
—	DF	COD	Gabriel Zakuani (on loan to Stoke City)
—	MF	ENG	Lee Cook (on loan to Charlton Athletic)
—	MF	NIR	Steven Davis (on loan to Rangers)
—	FW	FRA	Ismael Ehui (on loan to Carshalton Athletic)
—	FW	SWE	Björn Runström (on loan to 1. FC Kaiserslautern)

== Club ==
=== Management ===
Position	Staff
Manager	(England) Roy Hodgson
First-team coach	(England) Ray Lewington
Goalkeeping coach	(England) Mike Kelly
Reserve team coach	(Scotland) Billy McKinlay
Academy coach	(England) Gary Brazil
Head of youth development	(England) John Murtough
Physiotherapist	(Australia) Jason Palmer
Club doctor	(England) Steve Nance
Chief scout	(England) John Marshall

Last updated: 21 Sep 2007
Source: Fulham FC

=== Other information ===
Chairman	(Egypt) Mohamed Al Fayed
Managing director	(Scotland) David McNally
Technical director	(England) Les Reed
Director	(Egypt) Omar Fayed
Director	(Egypt) Karim Fayed
Director	(England) Mark Collins
Director	(England) Stuart Benson
Commercial manager	(England) Olly Dale
Commercial manager	(England) Mark Maunders
Secretary	(England) Zoe Ward
Ground (capacity and dimensions)	Craven Cottage (26,600 / 112x72 yards)

Source: Fulham article on 15 Aug 2007

== Competitions ==
=== Overall ===
Competition	Started round	Current position / round	Final position / round	First match	Last match
Premier League	—	—	17	12 Aug 2007	11 May 2008
Football League Cup	2nd round	—	2nd round	28 Aug 2007	26 September 2007
FA Cup	3rd round	—	3rd round	6 Jan 2008	22 January 2008

Updated to match played 11 May 2008
Source: Competitions

=== Premier League ===
==== Table ====
Pos	Team	Pld	W	D	L	GF	GA	GD	Pts	Qualification or relegation
15	Sunderland	38	11	6	21	36	59	−23	39	
16	Bolton Wanderers	38	9	10	19	36	54	−18	37	
17	Fulham	38	8	12	18	38	60	−22	36	
18	Reading (R)	38	10	6	22	41	66	−25	36	Relegation to Football League Championship
19	Birmingham City (R)	38	8	11	19	46	62	−16	35	Relegation to Football League Championship

Source: Barclays Premier League
Rules for classification: 1) points; 2) goal difference; 3) number of goals scored.
For further information on European qualification see Premier League – Competition
(R) Relegated

==== Results summary ====
Overall								Home						Away					
Pld	W	D	L	GF	GA	GD	Pts	W	D	L	GF	GA	GD	W	D	L	GF	GA	GD
38	8	12	18	38	60	−22	36	5	5	9	22	31	−9	3	7	9	16	29	−13

Last updated: 11 May 2008.
Source: Barclays Premier League

==== Results by round ====
Round	1	2	3	4	5	6	7	8	9	10	11	12	13	14	15	16	17	18	19	20	21	22	23	24	25	26	27	28	29	30	31	32	33	34	35	36	37	38
Ground	A	H	H	A	H	A	H	A	H	H	A	H	A	H	A	A	H	H	A	A	H	A	A	H	A	A	H	H	A	H	A	A	H	A	H	A	H	A
Result	L	W	L	L	D	D	D	D	L	D	D	W	L	D	L	L	L	D	L	D	L	L	L	D	W	L	L	L	D	W	L	D	L	W	L	W	W	W
Position	15	9	13	18	15	16	17	16	18	13	14	13	13	12	14	14	18	17	18	19	19	19	19	19	19	19	19	19	19	19	19	19	19	19	19	19	17	17

Updated to match(es) played on 11 May 2008. Source: Competitive Matches
A = Away; H = Home; W = Win; D = Draw; L = Loss

== Matches ==
=== Pre-season ===
2007-07-17	Dagenham & Redbridge	0–1	Fulham	Victoria Road, Dagenham
19:45		(Report)	Kamara 44'	Attendance: 1,224

2007-07-20	Brighton & Hove Albion	1–2	Fulham	Withdean Stadium, Brighton & Hove
20:00	Robinson 3'	(Report)	Dempsey 44'; Smertin 71'	Attendance: 3,658

2007-07-24	Portsmouth	1–0	Fulham	Hong Kong Stadium, So Kon Po
11:00	Benjani 44'	(Report)		Attendance: 36,801

2007-07-27	South China	1–4	Fulham	Hong Kong Stadium, So Kon Po
11:00	Barros 56'	(Report)	Diop 19'; Bocanegra 46'; Healy 73'; McBride 82'	Attendance: 39,535

2007-08-01	Staines Town	1–2	Fulham XI	Wheatsheaf Park, Staines
19:35	Watts 16' (o.g.)	(Report)	Timlin 35'; Gonçalves 77'	Attendance: 385; Referee: Paul Forrester

2007-08-03	Queens Park Rangers	2–1	Fulham	Loftus Road, Shepherd's Bush
20:00	Sahar 58', 68'	(Report)	McBride 10'	Attendance: 5,479

2007-08-07	Aldershot Town	1–1	Fulham XI	Recreation Ground, Aldershot
19:45	Chalmers 27'	(Report)	Brown 30' (pen.)	Attendance: 1,035; Referee: Steve Creighton

=== Premier League ===
2007-08-12 1	Arsenal	2–1	Fulham	Islington, London
12:00	Van Persie 84' (pen.); Hleb 90'	(Report)	Healy 1'	Stadium: Emirates Stadium; Attendance: 60,093; Referee: Phil Dowd

2007-08-15 2	Fulham	2–1	Bolton Wanderers	Fulham, London
19:45	Healy 23'; Cid 26' (o.g.)	(Report)	Helguson 12'	Stadium: Craven Cottage; Attendance: 21,102; Referee: Lee Probert

2007-08-18 3	Fulham	1–2	Middlesbrough	Fulham, London
15:00	McBride 16'	(Report)	Mido 55'; Cattermole 88'	Stadium: Craven Cottage; Attendance: 20,948; Referee: Lee Mason

2007-08-25 4	Aston Villa	2–1	Fulham	Birmingham, West Midlands
15:00	Young 51'; Maloney 90+1'	(Report)	Dempsey 6'	Stadium: Villa Park; Attendance: 36,638; Referee: Steve Bennett

2007-09-01 5	Fulham	3–3	Tottenham Hotspur	Fulham, London
15:00	Dempsey 42'; Rocha 77' (o.g.); Kamara 90'	(Report)	Kaboul 10'; Berbatov 28'; Bale 61'	Stadium: Craven Cottage; Attendance: 24,007; Referee: Mike Riley

2007-09-15 6	Wigan Athletic	1–1	Fulham	Wigan, Greater Manchester
15:00	Skoko (yellow card) 66'; Koumas 80'	(Report)	Dempsey 11'	Stadium: JJB Stadium; Attendance: 16,975; Referee: Rob Styles

2007-09-22 7	Fulham	3–3	Manchester City	Fulham, London
17:15	Davies 13'; Bouazza 48'; Murphy 75'	(Report)	Petrov 36', 60'; Mpenza 50'	Stadium: Craven Cottage; Attendance: 24,674; Referee: Mark Halsey

2007-09-29 8	Chelsea	0–0	Fulham	Walham Green, London
15:00		(Report)		Stadium: Stamford Bridge; Attendance: 41,147; Referee: Mark Halsey

2007-10-07 9	Fulham	0–2	Portsmouth	Fulham, London
16:10	Davis (yellow card) 21'	(Report)	Benjani 50'; Hreiðarsson 52'	Stadium: Craven Cottage; Attendance: 20,774; Referee: Howard Webb

2007-10-20 10	Fulham	0–0	Derby County	Fulham, London
15:00		(Report)		Stadium: Craven Cottage; Attendance: 22,576; Referee: Phil Dowd

2007-10-27 11	Sunderland	1–1	Fulham	Sunderland, Tyne and Wear
15:00	Jones 86'	(Report)	Davies 32'	Stadium: Stadium of Light; Attendance: 39,392; Referee: Andre Marriner

2007-11-03 12	Fulham	3–1	Reading	Fulham, London
15:00	Davies 18'; Dempsey 72'; Healy 90+1'	(Report)	Doyle 54'	Stadium: Craven Cottage; Attendance: 22,086; Referee: Mark Clattenburg

2007-11-10 13	Liverpool	2–0	Fulham	Liverpool, Merseyside
17:15	Torres 81'; Gerrard 85' (pen.)	(Report)		Stadium: Anfield; Attendance: 43,057; Referee: Steve Tanner

2007-11-25 14	Fulham	2–2	Blackburn Rovers	Fulham, London
16:00	Murphy 51'; Kamara 63'	(Report)	Emerton 57'; Warnock 79'	Stadium: Craven Cottage; Attendance: 22,826; Referee: Mike Dean

2007-12-03 15	Manchester United	2–0	Fulham	Trafford, Greater Manchester
20:00	Ronaldo 10', 58'	(Report)		Stadium: Old Trafford; Attendance: 75,055; Referee: Rob Styles

2007-12-08 16	Everton	3–0	Fulham	Liverpool, Merseyside
15:00	Yakubu 51', 61', 79'	(Report)		Stadium: Goodison Park; Attendance: 32,743; Referee: Steve Bennett

2007-12-15 17	Fulham	0–1	Newcastle United	Fulham, London
17:15		(Report)	Barton 90+2' (pen.)	Stadium: Craven Cottage; Attendance: 24,959; Referee: Howard Webb

2007-12-22 18	Fulham	1–1	Wigan Athletic	Fulham, London
15:00	Dempsey 78'	(Report)	Bent 70'	Stadium: Craven Cottage; Attendance: 20,820; Referee: Alan Wiley

2007-12-26 19	Tottenham Hotspur	5–1	Fulham	Tottenham, London
13:00	Keane 27', 62'; Huddlestone 46', 71'; Defoe 90'	(Report)	Dempsey 60'	Stadium: White Hart Lane; Attendance: 36,077; Referee: Andre Marriner

2007-12-29 20	Birmingham City	1–1	Fulham	Bordesley Green, Birmingham
15:00	Larsson 55'	(Report)	Bocanegra 8'	Stadium: St Andrew's Stadium; Attendance: 28,923; Referee: Mark Clattenburg

2008-01-01 21	Fulham	1–2	Chelsea	Fulham, London
12:45	Murphy 10' (pen.)	(Report)	Kalou 54'; Ballack 62' (pen.)	Stadium: Craven Cottage; Attendance: 25,357; Referee: Mark Halsey

2008-01-12 22	West Ham United	2–1	Fulham	Newham, London
15:00	Ashton 28'; Ferdinand 69'	(Report)	Davies 8'	Stadium: Upton Park; Attendance: 34,947; Referee: Mike Riley

2008-01-19 23	Fulham	0–3	Arsenal	Fulham, London
15:00		(Report)	Adebayor 19', 38'; Rosický 81'	Stadium: Craven Cottage; Attendance: 25,297; Referee: Peter Walton

2008-01-29 24	Bolton Wanderers	0–0	Fulham	Horwich, Bolton
20:00		(Report)		Stadium: Reebok Stadium; Attendance: 17,732; Referee: Mark Clattenburg

2008-02-03 25	Fulham	2–1	Aston Villa	Fulham, London
16:00	Davies 73'; Bullard 86'	(Report)	Hughes 69' (o.g.)	Stadium: Craven Cottage; Attendance: 24,760; Referee: Chris Foy

2008-02-09 26	Middlesbrough	1–0	Fulham	Middlesbrough, Tees Valley
15:00	Aliadière 11'	(Report)		Stadium: Riverside Stadium; Attendance: 26,885; Referee: Phil Dowd

2008-02-23 27	Fulham	0–1	West Ham United	Fulham, London
15:00		(Report)	Solano 87'	Stadium: Craven Cottage; Attendance: 25,280; Referee: Howard Webb

2008-03-01 28	Fulham	0–3	Manchester United	Fulham, London
15:00		(Report)	Hargreaves 15'; Park 44'; Davies 72' (o.g.)	Stadium: Craven Cottage; Attendance: 25,314; Referee: Mike Dean

2008-03-08 29	Blackburn Rovers	1–1	Fulham	Blackburn, Lancashire
15:00	Pedersen 59'	(Report)	Bullard 89'	Stadium: Ewood Park; Attendance: 20,362; Referee: Mike Riley

2008-03-16 30	Fulham	1–0	Everton	Fulham, London
13:30	McBride 67'	Report		Stadium: Craven Cottage; Attendance: 25,262; Referee: Steve Bennett

2008-03-22 31	Newcastle United	2–0	Fulham	Newcastle upon Tyne, Tyne and Wear
15:00	Viduka 6'; Owen 83'	Report		Stadium: St James' Park; Attendance: 52,293; Referee: Howard Webb

2008-03-29 32	Derby County	2–2	Fulham	Derby, Derbyshire
15:00	Villa 10', 80'	Report	Kamara 24'; Leacock 78' (o.g.)	Stadium: Pride Park; Attendance: 33,034; Referee: Mike Dean

2008-04-05 33	Fulham	1–3	Sunderland	Fulham, London
15:00	Healy 73'	Report	Collins 44'; Chopra 53'; Jones 75'	Stadium: Craven Cottage; Attendance: 25,053; Referee: Mark Halsey

2008-04-12 34	Reading	0–2	Fulham	Reading
15:00		Report	McBride 24'; Nevland 90+2'	Stadium: Madejski Stadium; Attendance: 24,112; Referee: Chris Foy

2008-04-19 35	Fulham	0–2	Liverpool	Fulham, London
15:00		Report	Pennant 17'; Crouch 70'	Stadium: Craven Cottage; Attendance: 25,311; Referee: Martin Atkinson

2008-04-26 36	Manchester City	2–3	Fulham	Manchester
15:00	Ireland 10'; Benjani 21'	Report	Kamara 70', 90+2'; Murphy 79'	Stadium: City of Manchester Stadium; Attendance: 44,504; Referee: Mike Dean

2008-05-03 37	Fulham	2–0	Birmingham City	Fulham, London
15:00	McBride 52'; Nevland 87'	Report		Stadium: Craven Cottage; Attendance: 25,308; Referee: Chris Foy

2008-05-11 38	Portsmouth	0–1	Fulham	Portsmouth
15:00		Report	Murphy 76'	Stadium: Fratton Park; Attendance: 20,582; Referee: Mark Clattenburg

=== League Cup ===
2007-08-28	Shrewsbury Town	0–1	Fulham	Shrewsbury, Shropshire
19:45		(Report)	Kamara 59'	Stadium: New Meadow; Attendance: 6,223; Referee: Paul Taylor

2007-09-26	Fulham	1–2 (a.e.t.)	Bolton Wanderers	Fulham, London
20:00	Healy 78'	(Report)	Guthrie 57'; Giannakopoulos 112'	Stadium: Craven Cottage; Attendance: 10,500; Referee: Steve Bennett

=== FA Cup ===
2008-01-06	Fulham	2–2	Bristol Rovers	Fulham, London
14:00	Healy 40'; Murphy 73'	(Report)	Coles 2'; Hinton 65'	Stadium: Craven Cottage; Attendance: 13,634; Referee: Keith Stroud

2008-01-22	Bristol Rovers	0–0 (a.e.t.) (5–3 p)	Fulham	Horfield, Bristol
19:45		(Report)	Stefanović (yellow card) 86' (yellow-red card) 119'	Stadium: Memorial Stadium; Attendance: 11,882; Referee: Martin Atkinson
	Penalties
	Lines (penalty scored); Jacobson (penalty scored); Lambert (penalty scored); Hinton (penalty scored); Disley (penalty scored)		(penalty missed) Bullard; (penalty scored) Konchesky; (penalty scored) Hughes; (penalty scored) Healy

== Squad statistics ==
No.	Pos.	Name	League		FA Cup		League Cup		Total		Discipline	
No.	Pos.	Name	Apps	Goals	Apps	Goals	Apps	Goals	Apps	Goals	Yellow card	Red card
1	GK	(United States) Kasey Keller	12	0	0	0	1	0	13	0	0	0
2	DF	(Germany) Moritz Volz	5 (4)	0	2	0	1	0	8 (4)	0	1	1
3	DF	(United States) Carlos Bocanegra	18 (4)	1	2	0	2	0	22 (4)	0	5	0
4	DF	(England) Paul Konchesky	32	0	2	0	2	0	36	0	5	1
5	DF	(France) Philippe Christanval	0 (1)	0	0	0	0	0	0 (1)	0	0	0
6	DF	(England) Zat Knight **	4	0	0	0	0	0	4	0	0	0
6	DF	(Serbia) Dejan Stefanović	13	0	2	0	0	0	15	0	4	1
7	MF	(South Korea) Seol Ki-hyeon	4 (8)	0	0 (2)	0	0 (1)	0	4 (11)	0	0	0
8	MF	(Russia) Alexey Smertin	11 (4)	0	1	0	1	0	13 (4)	0	2	0
9	FW	(Northern Ireland) David Healy	15 (15)	4	2	1	1 (1)	1	18 (16)	6	4	0
10	MF	(Northern Ireland) Steven Davis *	22	0	0 (1)	0	2	0	24 (1)	0	2	0
11	FW	(Senegal) Diomansy Kamara	16 (11)	5	0	0	1 (1)	1	17 (12)	6	7	0
12	GK	(Trinidad and Tobago) Tony Warner *	3	0	1	0	1	0	5	0	1	0
14	MF	(Senegal) Papa Bouba Diop	0 (2)	0	0	0	0	0	0 (2)	0	0	0
14	FW	(Finland) Shefki Kuqi **	3 (7)	0	0	0	0	0	3 (7)	0	0	0
14	FW	(United States) Eddie Johnson	4 (2)	0	0	0	0	0	4 (2)	0	0	0
15	FW	(Netherlands) Collins John *	0 (2)	0	0	0	0 (1)	0	0 (3)	0	0	0
15	FW	(Norway) Erik Nevland	2 (5)	2	0	0	0	0	2 (5)	2	1	0
17	DF	(Canada) Paul Stalteri	12	0	0	0	0	0	12	0	3	0
18	DF	(Northern Ireland) Aaron Hughes	28 (1)	0	1	0	1	0	30 (1)	0	0	0
19	DF	(England) Ian Pearce *	0 (1)	0	0	0	1	0	1 (1)	0	1	0
20	FW	(United States) Brian McBride (c)	13 (3)	4	0	0	0	0	13 (3)	4	1	0
21	MF	(England) Jimmy Bullard	14 (2)	2	1	0	0	0	15 (2)	2	0	0
22	DF	(England) Elliott Omozusi	8	0	0	0	0 (1)	0	8 (1)	0	0	0
23	MF	(United States) Clint Dempsey	28 (6)	6	2	0	2	0	32 (6)	6	4	0
24	MF	(Algeria) Hamer Bouazza	15 (5)	1	1	0	1	0	17 (5)	1	1	1
25	MF	(Wales) Simon Davies	35 (1)	5	1	0	2	0	38 (1)	5	6	0
26	MF	(Denmark) Leon Andreasen	9 (3)	0	0	0	0	0	9 (3)	0	2	1
27	MF	(England) Danny Murphy	27 (5)	5	1	1	1	0	29 (5)	6	5	0
29	GK	(Finland) Antti Niemi	22	0	1	0	0	0	23	0	0	0
30	MF	(England) Wayne Brown *	0	0	1	0	0	0	1	0	0	0
32	DF	(Norway) Brede Hangeland	14	0	0	0	0	0	14	0	1	0
34	DF	(Northern Ireland) Chris Baird	17 (1)	0	1 (1)	0	1	0	19 (2)	0	2	1
38	DF	(England) Nathan Ashton *	1	0	0	0	0	0	1	0	0	0

Updated 5 May 2008

- * Player is out on loan
- ** Player has left club
