= 2012–13 Racing de Santander season =

== Competitions ==
=== Segunda División ===
==== League table ====
| Pos | Team | Pld | W | D | L | GF | GA | GD | Pts | Promotion, qualification or relegation |
|---|---|---|---|---|---|---|---|---|---|---|
| 18 | Guadalajara (R) | 42 | 12 | 14 | 16 | 46 | 53 | −7 | 50 (Note: HÉR 0–0 GUA; GUA 0–2 HÉR) | Relegation to Segunda División B (Note: Guadalajara were relegated to the Segunda División B by the LFP. Guadalajara had appealed the decision, but LFP confirmed the sanction. CEDD also confirmed the relegation.) |
| 19 | Murcia | 42 | 12 | 11 | 19 | 43 | 56 | −13 | 47 | |
| 20 | Racing Santander (R) | 42 | 12 | 10 | 20 | 38 | 51 | −13 | 46 | Relegation to Segunda División B |
| 21 | Huesca (R) | 42 | 11 | 12 | 19 | 46 | 58 | −12 | 45 | Relegation to Segunda División B |
| 22 | Xerez (R) | 42 | 7 | 9 | 26 | 38 | 74 | −36 | 30 | Relegation to Tercera División (Note: Xerez were relegated to the Tercera División on 1 August after enduring serious financial difficulties for several years.) |

Source: LFP - Liga Adelante
Rules for classification: 1st points; 2nd head-to-head points; 3rd head-to-head goal difference; 4th head-to-head goals scored; 5th goal difference; 6th number of goals scored; 7th Fair-play points
(R) Relegated

==== Matches ====
Win Draw Loss Postponed

| 19 August 2012 1 | Racing de Santander | 0 – 1 | Las Palmas | Santander |
| 18:00 CEST | Francis (yellow card) 37'; Quique (yellow card) 75' | Summary | Chrisantus 29'; Corrales (yellow card) 41'; David García Santana (yellow card) 69'; Dani Castellano (yellow card) 89' | Stadium: Campos de Sport de El Sardinero; Attendance: 11,040; Referee: Iñaki Bikandi; Assistant referees: Ramón Hernández; Rubén Porras; Fourth official: Ander Zarrabeitia |

| 26 August 2012 2 | Córdoba | 2 – 0 | Racing de Santander | Córdoba |
| 17:00 CEST | López Silva 15'; Ruymán Hernández 71' | Summary | Albert Dorca (yellow card) 46' | Stadium: Estadio Nuevo Arcángel; Attendance: 8,537; Referee: Juan Martínez Munuera; Assistant referees: David Canales; Sergio Chinchilla; Fourth official: Victor Rives |

| 2 September 2012 3 | Racing de Santander | 0 – 0 | Sporting de Gijón | Santander |
| 11:00 CEST | Gaizka Saizar (yellow card) 22' | Summary | Ricardo (yellow card) 78'; Hugo Filipe Vieira (yellow card) 81'; Canella (yellow card) 84' | Stadium: Campos de Sport de El Sardinero; Attendance: 10,091; Referee: José María Sánchez Martínez; Assistant referees: Javier Martínez Nicolás; Juan Jose López Mir; Fourth official: Eduardo García |

| 9 September 2012 4 | Huesca | 1 – 1 | Racing de Santander | Huesca |
| 13:00 CEST | Nacho Novo 47'; Jorkin (yellow card) 89' | Summary | Kaluđerović 32'; Ruymán (yellow card) 72'; Jorge Alonso (yellow card) 77'; Héctor Yuste (yellow card) 88' | Stadium: Estadio El Alcoraz; Attendance: 3,000; Referee: Daniel Ocón; Assistant referees: Iñigo Retegui; Antonio Carreño |

| 15 September 2012 5 | Racing de Santander | 3 – 0 | Recreativo de Huelva | Santander |
| 13:00 CEST | Jairo Samperio 59'; Kaluđerović 64' (pen.); Kaluđerović (yellow card) 64'; Assulin 90+2' | Summary | Juan Zamora (yellow card) 61'; Jesús Rubio (yellow card) 86' | Stadium: Campos de Sport de El Sardinero; Attendance: 6,390; Referee: José Piñeiro; Assistant referees: Damián Abril; Francisco Villanueva; Fourth official: José Hernández |

| 22 September 2012 6 | Mirandés | 0 – 1 | Racing de Santander | Miranda de Ebro |
| 13:00 CEST | Raúl García (yellow card) 66' | Summary | Jairo Samperio (yellow card) 7'; Jorge Alonso (yellow card) 11'; David Rochela (yellow card) 44'; M. Kone 84' | Stadium: Estadio Municipal de Anduva; Attendance: 5,120; Referee: Ricardo de Burgos Bengoetxea; Assistant referees: Raúl Gago Santaolalla; Francisco García; Fourth official: Aarón Suberbiola |

| 29 September 2012 7 | Racing de Santander | 1 – 1 | Numancia | Santander |
| 13:00 CEST | Bouazza (yellow card) 7'; Albert Dorca 12'; Borja Docal (yellow card) 46'; Óscar Pérez (yellow card) 72' | Summary | Unai Expósito (yellow card) 31'; Sastrústegui (yellow card) 53'; Txomin Nagore (yellow card) 63' (goal) 73' (pen.); Nieto (yellow card) 79' | Stadium: Campos de Sport de El Sardinero; Attendance: 11,086; Referee: Santiago Jaime; Assistant referees: Juan Gallego; Jorge Bueno; Fourth official: Aitor Gorostegui |

| 6 October 2012 8 | Real Murcia | 1 – 0 | Racing de Santander | Murcia |
| 13:00 CEST | Molinero (yellow card) 39'; Molinero 60'; Emilio José Sánchez Fuentes (yellow card) 66'; Nafti (yellow card) 73' (yellow-red card) 79'; C. García (yellow card) 74' | Summary | Gullón (yellow card) 23'; Docal (yellow card) 70'; Bovela (red card) 89' | Stadium: Estadio Nueva Condomina; Attendance: 7,596; Referee: Dámaso Arcediano; Assistant referees: Enrique Rodríguez; Jaime Jiménez; Fourth official: Francisco Fernández |

=== Copa del Rey ===
| 12 September 2012 Second Round | Lugo | 0 – 1 | Racing de Santander | Lugo |
| 16:00 CEST | Fernando Seoane (yellow card) 83'; Héctor Font (yellow card) 88' | Summary | Kaluđerović 15'; Daniel Sotres (yellow card) 26'; Goikoetxea (yellow card) 34'; Óscar Pérez (yellow card) 62'; Bouazza (yellow card) 89' | Stadium: Estadio Anxo Carro; Attendance: 3,000; Referee: Pablo González |
