= 2006–07 in English football =

Football in England
- Season: 2006–07

Men's football
- FA Premier League: Manchester United
- Championship: Sunderland
- League One: Scunthorpe United
- League Two: Walsall
- Conference National: Dagenham & Redbridge
- FA Cup: Chelsea
- League Cup: Chelsea
- Community Shield: Liverpool

Women's football
- Premier League National Division: Arsenal
- Premier League Northern Division: Liverpool
- Premier League Southern Division: Watford
- FA Women's Cup: Arsenal
- Premier League Cup: Arsenal

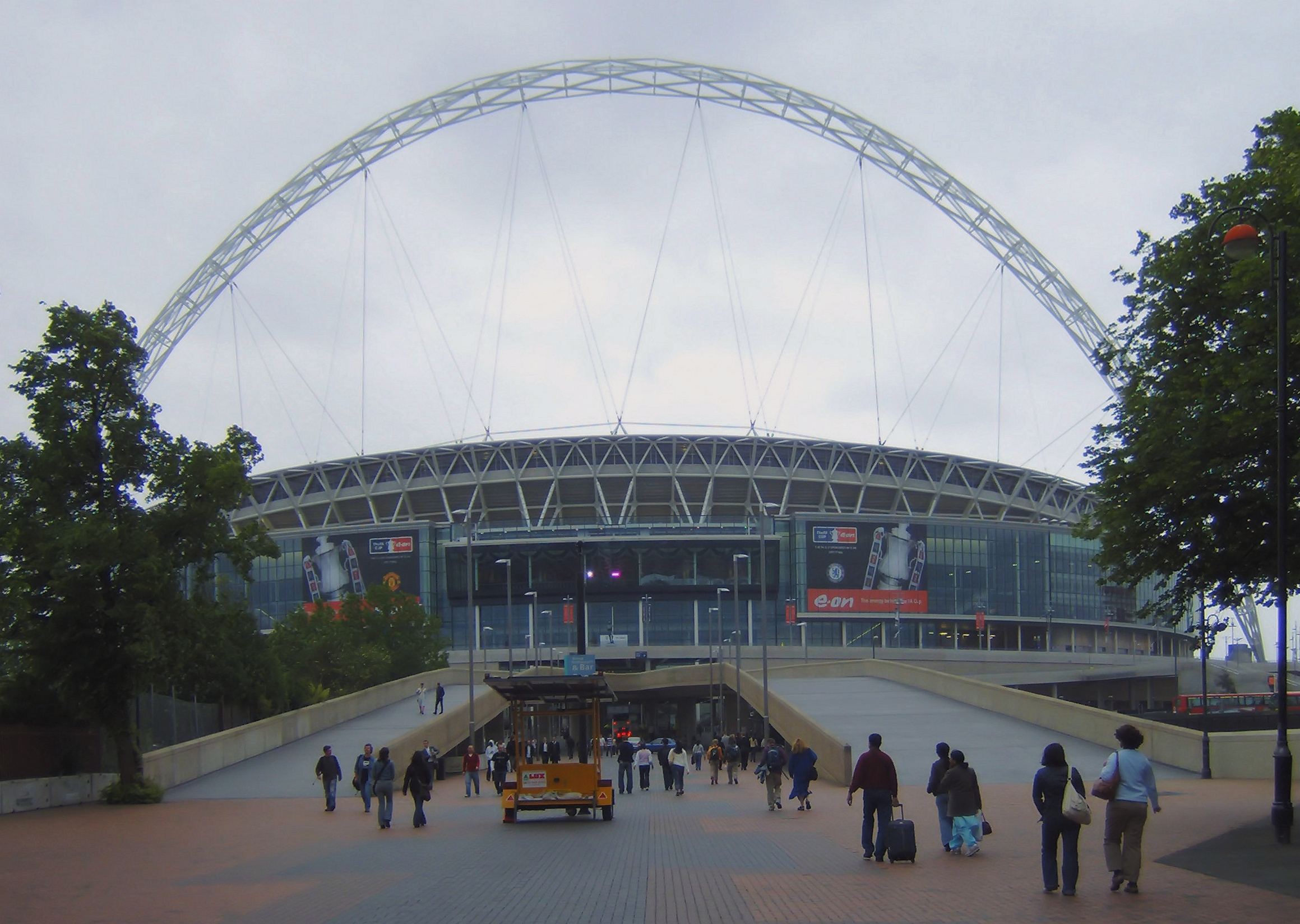
The new Wembley Stadium was completed in time for the 2006–07 season's FA Cup Final.

The 2006–07 season was the 127th season of competitive association football in England.

== Overview ==
- Manchester United regain the league title for the first time in four years, overcoming a stiff challenge from defending champions Chelsea to be crowned Premier League victors for the 9th time in 16 seasons
- The number of divisions at Level 8 of the English football league system increased from four to five. Level 9 decreased from fifteen divisions to fourteen.
- Wembley Stadium was completed to host the FA Cup Final, however it was not ready for the national team's first three 2008 UEFA European Football Championship home qualifiers. The three matches were played at Old Trafford in Manchester.
- Arsenal moved into their new home, the 60,000-capacity Emirates Stadium. Emirates became the club's shirt sponsor.
- Following promotion from the Championship, Reading played in the Premiership and the "top flight" of English football for the first time in their 135-year history and won their first game, coming back from 0–2 down to beat Middlesbrough 3–2. They went on to finish 8th.
- Accrington Stanley (the third, present version) played in the Football League for the first time. The previous club of the same name dissolved with massive debts and in 1962 became the first club to leave the Football League mid-season.
- Oxford United played in the Conference National after being relegated from the Football League. They are the first former winners of a major trophy to play at this level, having won the League Cup in 1986.

== Diary of the season ==
- 22 June 2006 – Fixtures for the Premier League and the Football League are released.
- 30 June 2006 – Rupert Lowe resigns from Southampton. Michael Wilde's consortium takes control of the club.
- 27 July 2006 – A consortium led by Niall Quinn takes full control of Sunderland after previously buying out the former chairman Bob Murray.
- 1 August 2006 – Steve McClaren begins his job as England manager.
- 2 August 2006 – Leeds United chairman Ken Bates reports his former club Chelsea to The Football Association, Premier League and FIFA over the alleged 'tapping-up' of three Leeds youth team players.
- 5 August 2006 – The Football League season begins, with Luton Town beating Leicester City 2–0 in the first game.
- 8 August 2006 – The 500,000th goal in the history of English league football (FA Premier League and Football League) was scored by Huddersfield Town's Gary Taylor-Fletcher in their 3–0 victory over Rotherham United.
- 10 August 2006 – John Terry is appointed as the new captain of England.
- 12 August 2006 – The Football Conference begins, along with most other non-league campaigns.
- 13 August 2006 – Liverpool take the first silverware of the season, as they beat Chelsea 2–1 in the FA Community Shield at the Millennium Stadium in Cardiff.
- 19 August 2006 – The Premier League season begins with Sheffield United and Liverpool drawing 1–1.
- 23 August 2006 – Manchester City defender Ben Thatcher elbows Portsmouth's Pedro Mendes in the face at the City of Manchester Stadium, after the two challenged for the same ball. This left Mendes unconscious and needing hospital treatment. Thatcher was shown a yellow card for the incident, but he was later banned by his club and charged with violent misconduct by The FA. Ole Gunnar Solskjær scores his first competitive goal in more than three years in Manchester United's 3–0 away league win over Charlton Athletic.
- 31 August 2006 – Chelsea are fined £40,000 by The FA for breaching doping regulations.
- 31 August 2006: August ends with last season's runners-up Manchester United top of the Premiership with three wins out of three. Portsmouth, Aston Villa, Everton, Chelsea, West Ham United and Liverpool complete the top seven. Watford, Sheffield United and Blackburn Rovers prop up the table with one point each from their opening three matches, with Arsenal only above the relegation zone on goal difference. Cardiff City lead the Championship, with Norwich City, Crystal Palace, Birmingham City and Wolverhampton Wanderers all three points behind the Welsh club and Burnley completing the top six, ahead of Plymouth Argyle and West Bromwich Albion on goal difference. Sunderland, despite playing in a lower division, have failed to turn around their poor form from the previous season and stand in the Championship drop zone, sandwiched by Colchester United and Hull City. Nottingham Forest lead the way in League One, with Port Vale second. Bradford, Tranmere, Brentford and Cheltenham Town completing the top six. Rotherham, only bottom after a 10 point deduction for due to entering a Company Voluntary Agreement, Scunthorpe United and Northampton Town sandwiching Millwall, failing to turn around their fortunes after relegation last season. Swindon Town, Walsall and Milton Keynes Dons lie in the automatic promotion places, with Peterborough and Lincoln a point behind. Wycombe and Wrecham complete the play-off places. Macclesfield and Rochdale in the drop zone.
- 4 September 2006 – Andy Webster's controversial move to Wigan Athletic is ratified by FIFA.
- 8 September 2006 – Liverpool get permission from Liverpool city council to build a new 60,000 all-seater stadium in nearby Stanley Park.
- 18 September 2006 – Bryan Robson is sacked after less than two years as manager of West Bromwich Albion.
- 19 September 2006 – After becoming majority shareholder at the club, Randy Lerner officially becomes chairman of Aston Villa, replacing 82-year-old Doug Ellis. A BBC Panorama programme is aired, alleging widespread corruption in the English game.
- 30 September 2006 – September ends with reigning champions Chelsea top of the Premiership. Bolton Wanderers are keeping up their push for a European place, being only two points behind in second place. Manchester United, Portsmouth, Everton, Aston Villa and Arsenal complete the top seven, with Tottenham Hotspur, Watford and Charlton Athletic in the relegation zone. Cardiff have extended their lead in the Championship to five points, ahead of Birmingham. Preston North End, Crystal Palace, Southampton and West Brom stand in the play-off places and Southend United, Hull City and Sheffield Wednesday in the relegation zone. Nottingham Forest continue to lead League One, with a three point cushion over their nearest challenges Yeovil Town and Bristol City, with Yeovil above Bristol City on goal difference. Bradford, Tranmere and Carlisle in the play-off places, with Scunthorpe a point behind, recovering from their slow start. Rotherham, Leyton Orient, Millwall and Blackpool in the bottom four. Walsall lead League Two, with Swindon and Wycombe completing the automatic promotion places. Lincoln, MK Dons, Notts County and Hartlepool complete the top seven. Macclesfield and Boston United in the drop zone.
- 1 October 2006 – Norwich City, 17th in the Championship, sack manager Nigel Worthington after nearly six years in charge.
- 14 October 2006 – Chelsea goalkeepers, Petr Čech and Carlo Cudicini, both received head injuries during their match against Reading. Čech underwent surgery for a depressed skull fracture and is expected to be out for six months, while Cudicini was treated and released.
- 16 October 2006 – Norwich City appoint West Ham United assistant manager Peter Grant as their new manager.
- 18 October 2006 – Hibernian's Tony Mowbray is appointed manager of West Bromwich Albion.
- 28 October 2006 – Aston Villa, the last unbeaten team in any professional English division, lose 3–1 to Liverpool at Anfield.
- 30 October 2006 – Manchester United have moved to the top of the Premiership on goal difference; both United and Chelsea have 25 points apiece. Bolton, Portsmouth, Arsenal, Everton and Aston Villa complete the top seven, while Watford, Sheffield United and Charlton Athletic finish the month in the relegation zone. Cardiff remain top of the Championship and Preston have claimed second place, with Burnley, Birmingham, West Brom and Plymouth not far behind. Hull, Barnsley and Southend stand in the bottom three.
- 21 November 2006 – West Ham United accept Eggert Magnússon's £85 million takeover bid for the club.
- 29 November 2006 – England National Game XI, the English semi-professional team, win the inaugural European Challenge Trophy after a 4–1 win over the Netherlands.
- 30 November 2006 – Manchester United remain top of the Premiership, three points ahead of Chelsea. Portsmouth, having narrowly avoided relegation the previous season, are maintaining their European push although they are 11 points adrift of Chelsea in third. Bolton, Aston Villa, Arsenal and Liverpool complete the top seven, while Sheffield United, Watford and Charlton Athletic remain in the relegation zone. Preston have leaped to the top of the Championship, a point ahead of Cardiff, Birmingham and Derby County. Burnley and Stoke City are also challenging for a play-off spot, while Leeds United, Hull and Southend are battling relegation.
- 5 December 2006 – Macclesfield Town, the last team without a win in the Football League, beat Rochdale 1–0 at Moss Rose.
- 20 December 2006 – Bury are thrown out of this season's FA Cup after they fielded an ineligible player, Stephen Turnbull, on-loan from Hartlepool United in their 3–1 second round replay win at Chester City on 12 December. Chester will replace Bury in the third round. Lord Stevens releases the results of his inquiry in the allegation of corruption in the English game, pin-pointing seventeen transfers that he will investigate further.
- 23 December 2006 – Doncaster Rovers play their final game at Belle Vue against Nottingham Forest. They move into the 15,000 seat Keepmoat Stadium.
- 30 December 2006 – Moritz Volz of Fulham scored the 15,000th goal in the history of the F.A. Premier League, opening the scoring in his side's 2–2 draw away at Chelsea.
- 30 December 2006 – Manchester United have increased the gap between them and Chelsea, still in second place, to six points. Bolton, Liverpool, Arsenal, Portsmouth and Everton complete the top seven. Watford see in the New Year being bottom of the Premiership and ten points adrift of safety, with West Ham United and Charlton Athletic also several points behind fellow strugglers Sheffield United, Wigan Athletic and Middlesbrough. Birmingham now lead the Championship, six points ahead of Preston and Derby. Colchester have overcome a slow start to stand in sixth, behind Southampton and West Brom. Hull, Leeds and Southend remain in the Championship drop zone.
- 11 January 2007 – Former Barrow defender James Cotterill is sentenced to four months in prison for causing grievous bodily harm to Bristol Rovers player Sean Rigg during an FA Cup first round match in November 2006. Rigg suffered a double fracture of the jaw after being punched by Cotterill.
- 16 January 2007 – In the FA Cup third round replays, third tier Bristol City knock out Championship club Coventry City. Elsewhere, top-flight sides Manchester City and Middlesbrough survive scares against Football League teams to progress, beating Sheffield Wednesday and Hull City respectively.
- 25 January 2007 – Peter Taylor resigns as England under-21 manager, stating that he wants to focus on managing his other team, Crystal Palace.
- 31 January 2007 – Manchester United remain top of the Premiership and look safe to reclaim the title they last won in 2003. Chelsea remain six points behind, with Liverpool, Arsenal, Bolton, Portsmouth and Reading (the latter expected by many to struggle in their first ever top-flight campaign) completing the top seven. The relegation zone remains unchanged from the end of December, but the strugglers are cranking up the pressure on Wigan Athletic. Derby end the month as the leader of the Championship, six points clear of Birmingham (who have two games in hand) and Preston, with West Brom, Southampton and a resurgent Cardiff not far behind. Leeds has swapped places with Southend at the foot of the Championship while Hull have escaped the bottom three at the expense of QPR.
- 1 February. 2007 – Stuart Pearce is appointed as Peter Taylor's replacement.
- 6 February 2007 – George Gillett and Tom Hicks complete their takeover of Liverpool.
- 7 February 2007 – Milan Mandarić completes his takeover of Leicester City.
- 25 February 2007 – Chelsea defeat Arsenal 2–1 in the Carling Cup final at the Millennium Stadium. The match was marred by a mass brawl between the two sides during the final few minutes of the game, in which three players were sent off.
- 28 March 2007 – Manchester United now lead Chelsea by nine points, but have played one match more. Liverpool, Arsenal and Bolton are still in the mix for a Champions League place, with sixth-placed Reading and seventh-place Everton's challenge for UEFA Cup qualification is being threatened by Portsmouth and Tottenham. Wigan remains six points ahead of eighteenth-placed Charlton, joined in the relegation zone by West Ham and Watford. Birmingham are back on top of the Championship, a point ahead of West Brom and Derby. An improving Sunderland have moved into the top six, ahead of Southampton and Cardiff. The relegation zone is unchanged from the end of January.
- 3 March 2007 – Stockport County set a Football League record of nine consecutive wins without conceding a goal by beating Swindon Town 3–0 at Edgeley Park. Goalkeeper Wayne Hennessey keeps the club record nine consecutive clean sheets and is named Player of the Month for February 2007.
- 17 March 2007 – The new Wembley Stadium opens for a special community event.
- 31 March 2007 – Chelsea have moved to within six points of leaders Manchester United but, with only seven matches left to play, there is little hope of the Londoners retaining the title for a third successive season. Liverpool and Arsenal have put distance between Bolton in the chase for the Champions League, who complete the top seven with Everton and Tottenham. Charlton, West Ham and Watford remain in the relegation zone but have caught up with strugglers Wigan and Sheffield United, now only three points and one point above the relegation zone respectively. Sunderland have finally moved into the automatic promotion spots in the Championship, sandwiched by leaders Derby and Birmingham. Preston, West Brom and Wolves are in the play-off places. Luton Town have slipped to the bottom of the table, behind Southend and Leeds.
- 1 April 2007 – Doncaster Rovers win the competition for lower-division football league clubs, as they beat Bristol Rovers 3–2 after extra time in the Johnstone's Paint Trophy at the Millennium Stadium in Cardiff.
- 7 April 2007 – Dagenham & Redbridge win the Conference National and promotion to the Football League.
- 9 April 2007 – St Albans City are relegated from the Conference National. Brentford are relegated to League Two.
- 10 April 2007 – Manchester United beat Roma 7–1 in the Champions League quarter-final second leg at Old Trafford, completing an 8–3 aggregate victory and booking their first semi-final appearance in the competition for five years.
- 14 April 2007 – Torquay United are relegated to the Conference. Scunthorpe United are promoted to the Championship. Hartlepool United and Walsall are both promoted to League One. Rotherham United are relegated to League Two.
- 20 April 2007 – Luton Town are relegated to League One.
- 21 April 2007 – Watford are relegated from the Premiership. Droylsden are promoted to the Conference.
- 22 April 2007 – Cristiano Ronaldo is named PFA Player of the Year as well as PFA Young Player of the Year. Eight out of the eleven players who are named in the PFA Premiership Team of the Year are Manchester United players, including Ronaldo.
- 24 April 2007 – Tamworth and Southport are relegated from the Conference. Manchester United beat Milan 3–2 in the Champions League semi-final first leg at Old Trafford.
- 28 April 2007 – Southend United are relegated from the Championship. Chesterfield and Bradford City are both relegated from League One.
- 29 April 2007 – Derby County lose to Crystal Palace meaning that Birmingham City and Sunderland are promoted to the Premiership. Sam Allardyce resigns after seven and a half years as manager of Bolton Wanderers.
- 30 April 2007 – Sammy Lee is promoted from the coaching staff to the manager's seat at Bolton Wanderers.
- 30 April 2007 – Manchester United remain five points ahead of Chelsea with both left with three games to play, but both have secured automatic Champions League qualification, meaning Liverpool and Arsenal will both have to face a two-legged tie to secure qualification to the group stage. Two points separate Bolton, Everton, Reading, Portsmouth and Tottenham in the race to qualify for the UEFA Cup. At the bottom of the table Watford have already been relegated, with Charlton and a resurgent West Ham completing the relegation zone but still with a slim chance of survival at the possible expense of Wigan, Fulham, Sheffield United and Middlesbrough.
- 1 May 2007 – Liverpool beat Chelsea on penalties in the Champions League semi-final at Anfield after both sides won their home leg 1–0.
- 2 May 2007 – Manchester United's hopes of an all-English European Cup final with Liverpool and second Treble are ended when they lose 3–0 to Milan in the semi-final second leg at the San Siro.
- 4 May 2007 – Leeds United are relegated to League One for the first time in their history after they go into administration.
- 5 May 2007 – Manchester United come out on top in the Manchester derby beating Manchester City 1–0. In doing so United extend their lead at the top of the Premiership to 8 points. City's failure to score means that they set a new record for the fewest goals scored at home in a season by a club in the top flight, with only 10 scored in the season. Bristol City are promoted to the Championship. Boston United are relegated to the Conference. Swindon Town are promoted to League One and Walsall are League Two champions. MK Dons moved out of the National Hockey Stadium and into stadium:mk
- 6 May 2007 – Manchester United win the Premiership after Chelsea only draw 1–1 at Arsenal. Sunderland win the Championship with a 5–0 win at Luton Town, whilst Birmingham City lose 1–0 at Preston North End.
- 7 May 2007 – Arsenal Ladies completed an unprecedented Quadruple of trophies, defeating Charlton Athletic 4–1 in the FA Women's Cup final, to add to their FA Women's Premier League, Women's League Cup and UEFA Women's Cup victories. Charlton Athletic are relegated from the Premiership after they lose to Tottenham Hotspur.
- 13 May 2007 – Sheffield United are relegated from the Premiership after losing 2–1 at home to Wigan Athletic and West Ham United beat Manchester United 1–0 at Old Trafford. The season ends with Manchester United champions, Chelsea runners-up and Liverpool and Arsenal completing the top four. Tottenham, Everton and Bolton all qualify for the UEFA Cup.
- 16 May 2007 – Neil Warnock resigns after seven and a half years in charge of Sheffield United.
- 18 May 2007 – The Football League confirms that Boston United were docked ten points for entering a Company Voluntary Arrangement in the final seconds of their League Two defeat at Wrexham, a game which saw The Pilgrims relegated.
- 19 May 2007 – Chelsea beat Manchester United 1–0 to win the FA Cup. at the first FA Cup Final at the new Wembley and stop Manchester United winning the double.
- 20 May 2007 – Morecambe are promoted to the Football League for the first time in their history after beating Exeter City 2–1 in the Conference National play-off final.
- 23 May 2007 – A.C. Milan beat Liverpool 2–1 in the European Cup final in Athens, two years after Liverpool had beaten the Italians on penalties after a 3–3 draw in the Istanbul final.
- 26 May 2007 – Bristol Rovers win the League Two play-off final.
- 27 May 2007 – Blackpool win the League One play off final.
- 28 May 2007 – Derby County defeat West Bromwich Albion 1–0 in the Championship play-off final.
- 20 June 2007 – Nottingham Forest announce plans to relocate from the City Ground to a new 50,000-seat stadium by 2014. Scarborough, who were relegated from the Conference North this season but are best remembered for being Football League members from 1897 to 1999, go out of business with debts of £2.5million.
- 25 June 2007 – Five days after the demise of the 128-year-old Scarborough FC, a new club – Scarborough Athletic – is formed.

=== Clubs removed ===
- Scarborough (Conference North)

== Managerial changes ==
Name	Club	Date of departure	Replacement	Date of appointment
Glenn Hoddle	Wolverhampton Wanderers	1 July 2006	Mick McCarthy	21 July 2006
David O'Leary	Aston Villa	19 July 2006	Martin O'Neill	4 August 2006
Niall Quinn	Sunderland	28 August 2006	Roy Keane	28 August 2006
Dave Penney	Doncaster Rovers	30 August 2006	Sean O'Driscoll	8 September 2006
Mark McGhee	Brighton & Hove Albion	8 September 2006	Dean Wilkins	29 September 2006
Sean O'Driscoll	AFC Bournemouth	8 September 2006	Kevin Bond	13 October 2006
Bryan Robson	West Bromwich Albion	18 September 2006	Tony Mowbray	13 October 2006
Gary Waddock	Queens Park Rangers	20 September 2006	John Gregory	20 September 2006
Kevin Blackwell	Leeds United	20 September 2006	Dennis Wise	24 October 2006
Nigel Spackman	Millwall	25 September 2006	Willie Donachie	22 November 2006
Nigel Worthington	Norwich City	1 October 2006	Peter Grant	13 October 2006
Brian Horton	Macclesfield Town	1 October 2006	Paul Ince	23 October 2006
David Hodgson	Darlington	4 October 2006	Dave Penney	30 October 2006
Paul Sturrock	Sheffield Wednesday	19 October 2006	Brian Laws	6 November 2006
Dennis Wise	Swindon Town	24 October 2006	Paul Sturrock	7 November 2006
Graham Rodger	Grimsby Town	6 November 2006	Alan Buckley	9 November 2006
Brian Laws	Scunthorpe United	6 November 2006	Nigel Adkins	7 December 2006
Iain Dowie	Charlton Athletic	13 November 2006	Les Reed	14 November 2006
Leroy Rosenior	Brentford	18 November 2006	Scott Fitzgerald	21 December 2006
Andy Ritchie	Barnsley	21 November 2006	Simon Davey	31 December 2006
Ian Atkins	Torquay United	27 November 2006	Luboš Kubík	27 November 2006
Phil Parkinson	Hull City	4 December 2006	Phil Brown	4 January 2007
Alan Pardew	West Ham United	11 December 2006	Alan Curbishley	13 December 2006
Steve Parkin	Rochdale	17 December 2006	Keith Hill	3 January 2007
Peter Shirtliff	Mansfield Town	19 December 2006	Billy Dearden	28 December 2006
John Gorman	Northampton Town	20 December 2006	Stuart Gray	2 January 2007
Les Reed	Charlton Athletic	24 December 2006	Alan Pardew	24 December 2006
Denis Smith	Wrexham	11 January 2007	Brian Carey	12 January 2007
Keith Alexander	Peterborough United	15 January 2007	Darren Ferguson	20 January 2007
Micky Adams	Coventry City	17 January 2007	Iain Dowie	19 January 2007
Luboš Kubík	Torquay United	5 February 2007	Keith Curle	8 February 2007
Colin Todd	Bradford City	12 February 2007	Stuart McCall	22 May 2007
Kenny Jackett	Swansea City	15 February 2007	Roberto Martínez	24 February 2007
Alan Knill	Rotherham United	1 March 2007	Mark Robins	6 April 2007
Peter Jackson	Huddersfield Town	6 March 2007	Andy Ritchie	11 April 2007
Roy McFarland	Chesterfield	12 March 2007	Lee Richardson	26 April 2007
Mike Newell	Luton Town	15 March 2007	Kevin Blackwell	27 March 2007
Scott Fitzgerald	Brentford	10 April 2007	Terry Butcher	24 April 2007
Chris Coleman	Fulham	10 April 2007	Lawrie Sanchez	11 May 2007
Rob Kelly	Leicester City	11 April 2007	Martin Allen	25 May 2007
Sam Allardyce	Bolton Wanderers	29 April 2007	Sammy Lee	30 April 2007
Mark Wright	Chester City	30 April 2007	Bobby Williamson	11 May 2007
Glenn Roeder	Newcastle United	6 May 2007	Sam Allardyce	15 May 2007
Paul Jewell	Wigan Athletic	14 May 2007	Chris Hutchings	14 May 2007
Stuart Pearce	Manchester City	14 May 2007	Sven-Göran Eriksson	6 July 2007
Neil Warnock	Sheffield United	16 May 2007	Bryan Robson	22 May 2007
Martin Allen	Milton Keynes Dons	25 May 2007	Paul Ince	25 June 2007
Paul Ince	Macclesfield Town	24 June 2007	Ian Brightwell	29 June 2007

== National team ==
England began their qualifying campaign for Euro 2008 in September, beating Andorra 5–0. Steve McClaren began his reign as head coach against Greece.

Date	Venue	Opponents	Score	Competition	England scorers	Match report
16 August 2006	Old Trafford (H)	Greece	4–0	F	John Terry; Frank Lampard; Peter Crouch (2)	BBC
2 September 2006	Old Trafford (H)	Andorra	5–0	ECQ	Peter Crouch (2); Steven Gerrard; Jermain Defoe (2)	BBC
6 September 2006	Skopje City Stadium (A)	Macedonia	1–0	ECQ	Peter Crouch	BBC
7 October 2006	Old Trafford (H)	Macedonia	0–0	ECQ		BBC
11 October 2006	Maksimir Stadium, Zagreb (A)	Croatia	0–2	ECQ		BBC
15 November 2006	Amsterdam ArenA (A)	Netherlands	1–1	F	Wayne Rooney	BBC
7 February 2007	Old Trafford (H)	Spain	0–1	F		BBC
24 March 2007	Ramat Gan Stadium, Ramat Gan (A)	Israel	0–0	ECQ		BBC
28 March 2007	Estadi Olímpic Lluís Companys, Barcelona, Spain (A)	Andorra	3–0	ECQ	Steven Gerrard (2); David Nugent	BBC
1 June 2007	Wembley Stadium (H)	Brazil	1–1	F	John Terry	BBC
6 June 2007	A. Le Coq Arena, Tallinn (A)	Estonia	3–0	ECQ	Joe Cole; Peter Crouch; Michael Owen	BBC

Key

- H = Home match
- A = Away match
- F = Friendly
- ECQ = European Championship qualifier

== Honours ==
=== League football ===
Competition	Winner	Details	Match report
Premier League	Manchester United	2006–07 Premier League	BBC
FA Cup	Chelsea	2006–07 FA Cup beat Manchester United 1–0 in final	BBC
Carling Cup	Chelsea	2006–07 Carling Cup beat Arsenal 2–1 in final	BBC
Football League Championship	Sunderland	2006–07 Football League	BBC
Football League One	Scunthorpe United	2006–07 Football League	BBC
Football League Two	Walsall	2006–07 Football League	BBC
Johnstone's Paint Trophy	Doncaster Rovers	beat Bristol Rovers 3–2 in final	BBC
FA Community Shield	Manchester United	2007 FA Community Shield beat Chelsea 1–1 (3-0 on penalties)	BBC

=== Non-league football ===
Competition	Winners	Details
Conference National winners	Dagenham & Redbridge	
Conference National playoff winners	Morecambe	
Conference North winners	Droylsden	
Conference North playoff winners	Farsley Celtic	
Conference South winners	Histon	
Conference South playoff winners	Salisbury City	
FA Trophy	Stevenage Borough	beat Kidderminster 3–2 in final
FA Vase	Truro City	beat A.F.C. Totton 3–1 in final

== European qualification ==
Competition	Qualifiers	Reason for Qualification
UEFA Champions League	Manchester United	1st in FA Premier League
UEFA Champions League	Chelsea	2nd in FA Premier League
UEFA Champions League Third Qualifying Round	Liverpool	3rd in FA Premier League
UEFA Champions League Third Qualifying Round	Arsenal	4th in FA Premier League
UEFA Cup	Tottenham Hotspur	5th in FA Premier League
UEFA Cup	Everton	In lieu of League Cup winners (qualification awarded as next-highest (6th) Premier League finishers to have not qualified for Europe because League Cup winners Chelsea had already qualified for the Champions League)
UEFA Cup	Bolton Wanderers	In lieu of FA Cup winners (qualification awarded as next-highest (7th) Premier League finishers to have not qualified for Europe because FA Cup winners Chelsea and Runners Up Manchester United had already qualified for the Champions League)
UEFA Intertoto Cup third round	Blackburn Rovers	Highest Premier League finishers (10th) to have entered and not qualified for any other European competition

== League tables ==
=== FA Premier League ===
After 3 seasons of missing out, Manchester United fought off the challenge of Chelsea and regained the Premier League title for the 9th time in 15 years. Despite finishing second, the Blues claimed a League Cup and FA Cup double, and Didier Drogba was the top flight's leading goalscorer with 20 in the league. The final two Champions League places went to Liverpool (who nearly won the competition for the 2nd time in 3 seasons only to lose out to A.C. Milan, the same opponents from the final 2 years previous) and Arsenal. Tottenham and Everton qualified for the UEFA Cup, as did Bolton, despite the departure of long-serving manager Sam Allardyce shortly before the end of the season. Blackburn qualified for the Intertoto Cup thanks to the 18 goals of striker Benni McCarthy as well as the impressive efforts of manager Mark Hughes.

Newly promoted Reading, tipped by many critics for relegation, defied the odds by finishing 8th on their first ever season in the top flight. Portsmouth put last season's managerial debacle behind them to finish 9th, finishing just 2 points short of European qualification. Aston Villa's campaign, their first under former Celtic manager Martin O'Neill, marked an improvement on the previous campaign which saw them go undefeated in their first nine and last nine matches, although a staggering 17 draws prevented a top-half finish.

Watford finished bottom, managing only 5 wins all season as they made a swift return to the Championship. The loss of Alan Curbishley and 3 managerial changes in Iain Dowie, Les Reed and then Alan Pardew ended Charlton Athletic's 7-year stay in the top flight. Ironically, Curbishley took charge at West Ham, another London club who looked certain for the drop after a poor season. However, a run of seven wins from their final nine matches was enough to secure their Premiership status, with a goal from Carlos Tevez giving the Hammers victory over champions Manchester United at Old Trafford, while sending Sheffield United down and beginning speculation from the Yorkshire club over whether Tevez was eligible to play. The matter was eventually settled out of court, with West Ham fined £5.5 million by the Premier League and ordered to pay the Blades compensation over five years. Wigan Athletic, in their second year in the top flight, narrowly avoided relegation on goal difference.

Pos	Team	Pld	W	D	L	GF	GA	GD	Pts	Qualification or relegation
1	Manchester United (C)	38	28	5	5	83	27	+56	89	Qualification for the Champions League group stage
2	Chelsea	38	24	11	3	64	24	+40	83	Qualification for the Champions League group stage
3	Liverpool	38	20	8	10	57	27	+30	68	Qualification for the Champions League third qualifying round
4	Arsenal	38	19	11	8	63	35	+28	68	Qualification for the Champions League third qualifying round
5	Tottenham Hotspur	38	17	9	12	57	54	+3	60	Qualification for the UEFA Cup first round (Note: Since both finalists of the FA Cup (Manchester United and Chelsea) and the League Cup winners (Chelsea) were qualified for the Champions League, their UEFA Cup spots were given to the 6th- and 7th-placed Premier League teams.)
6	Everton	38	15	13	10	52	36	+16	58	Qualification for the UEFA Cup first round
7	Bolton Wanderers	38	16	8	14	47	52	−5	56	Qualification for the UEFA Cup first round
8	Reading	38	16	7	15	52	47	+5	55	
9	Portsmouth	38	14	12	12	45	42	+3	54	
10	Blackburn Rovers	38	15	7	16	52	54	−2	52	Qualification for the Intertoto Cup third round (Note: The highest-placed team who applied for the Intertoto Cup and not in an automatic UEFA Cup spot was awarded with a place in that competition. Blackburn Rovers occupied the Intertoto place, because Portsmouth and Reading did not apply. A further place in the UEFA Cup was up for grabs via the Premiership Fair Play League. The winner is placed into a draw with the winners of Fair Play leagues in other countries. The representatives from the two countries that come out of the hat first are given a place in the UEFA Cup first qualifying round. Since the winners of the Premiership Fair Play League, Tottenham Hotspur, had already qualified for the UEFA Cup by virtue of their league position, their place in the Fair Play draw was given to Aston Villa. However, the places in the UEFA Cup were awarded to the representatives from Finland and Norway.)
11	Aston Villa	38	11	17	10	43	41	+2	50	
12	Middlesbrough	38	12	10	16	44	49	−5	46	
13	Newcastle United	38	11	10	17	38	47	−9	43	
14	Manchester City	38	11	9	18	29	44	−15	42	
15	West Ham United	38	12	5	21	35	59	−24	41	
16	Fulham	38	8	15	15	38	60	−22	39	
17	Wigan Athletic	38	10	8	20	37	59	−22	38	
18	Sheffield United (R)	38	10	8	20	32	55	−23	38	Relegation to Football League Championship
19	Charlton Athletic (R)	38	8	10	20	34	60	−26	34	Relegation to Football League Championship
20	Watford (R)	38	5	13	20	29	59	−30	28	Relegation to Football League Championship

Source: Barclays Premier League
Rules for classification: 1) points; 2) goal difference; 3) number of goals scored.
(C) Champions; (R) Relegated
Notes:

Leading goalscorer: Didier Drogba (Chelsea) – 20

=== Football League Championship ===
After losing their first four games, Sunderland looked ominous for a second relegation. The surprise appointment of Roy Keane by rookie chairman Niall Quinn paid off and they surged up the table, losing just one of their final 20 games to clinch promotion as champions. Keane's former Manchester United colleague, Steve Bruce also took Birmingham City back into the Premier League, ensuring that they only remained in the Championship for one season.

Derby County spent half the season in the top 2, but fell away in the final weeks to slip into the play-off places. Nonetheless, they won promotion by beating West Bromwich Albion 1–0 in the final at the recently opened new Wembley Stadium. This denied the Baggies an immediate return to the Premier League, which would have meant all 3 relegated clubs from the previous season were promoted.

Preston were perhaps the biggest chokers as they lost 5 of their final 7 games to slump out of the play-off places they had occupied through the bulk of the season, missing out on a third successive play-off finish. Cardiff City had been the early pace-setters, leading the table up until the midway point before their form tailed off badly in the second half.

After a play-off final appearance the previous year, Leeds finished bottom amidst yet more financial worries and acrimony, falling into the relegation zone in early October and, despite a late improvement, never leaving it. Their placing at the foot of the table was due to a 10-point deduction they suffered after going into voluntary administration after their relegation was all but confirmed on the penultimate weekend. The club came close to being expelled from the Football League during the summer after being unable to agree a deal with their creditors, but they were allowed to remain for the following season, albeit with a 15-point deduction. Regardless, it meant they would spend next season competing outside of the top two divisions for the first time in their history.

Luton, who would have finished bottom but for Leeds's deduction, were relegated after being forced to sell many of their top players due to mounting financial problems. They had spent the first half of the season safely in mid-table, but a disastrous run of form after the turn of the year saw them relegated back to League One after just two seasons. Southend lasted only a single season in the Championship after their two successive promotions; their season was essentially the opposite of Luton's, winning just three games until the turn of the year before an improvement in form gave them some hope. Colchester fared best of the newly promoted clubs, comfortably finishing in 10th, largely on the back of their strong home form at the division's smallest stadium, Layer Road.

Pos	Team	Pld	W	D	L	GF	GA	GD	Pts	Promotion, qualification or relegation
1	Sunderland (C, P)	46	27	7	12	76	47	+29	88	Promotion to the Premier League
2	Birmingham City (P)	46	26	8	12	67	42	+25	86	Promotion to the Premier League
3	Derby County (O, P)	46	25	9	12	62	46	+16	84	Qualification for Championship play-offs
4	West Bromwich Albion	46	22	10	14	81	55	+26	76	Qualification for Championship play-offs
5	Wolverhampton Wanderers	46	22	10	14	59	56	+3	76	Qualification for Championship play-offs
6	Southampton	46	21	12	13	77	53	+24	75	Qualification for Championship play-offs
7	Preston North End	46	22	8	16	64	53	+11	74	
8	Stoke City	46	19	16	11	62	41	+21	73	
9	Sheffield Wednesday	46	20	11	15	70	66	+4	71	
10	Colchester United	46	20	9	17	70	56	+14	69	
11	Plymouth Argyle	46	17	16	13	63	62	+1	67	
12	Crystal Palace	46	18	11	17	59	51	+8	65	
13	Cardiff City	46	17	13	16	57	53	+4	64	
14	Ipswich Town	46	18	8	20	64	59	+5	62	
15	Burnley	46	15	12	19	52	49	+3	57	
16	Norwich City	46	16	9	21	56	71	−15	57	
17	Coventry City	46	16	8	22	47	62	−15	56	
18	Queens Park Rangers	46	14	11	21	54	68	−14	53	
19	Leicester City	46	13	14	19	49	64	−15	53	
20	Barnsley	46	15	5	26	53	85	−32	50	
21	Hull City	46	13	10	23	51	67	−16	49	
22	Southend United (R)	46	10	12	24	47	80	−33	42	Relegation to Football League One
23	Luton Town (R)	46	10	10	26	53	81	−28	40	Relegation to Football League One
24	Leeds United (R)	46	13	7	26	46	72	−26	36 (Note: Leeds United had 10 points deducted for entering financial administration.)	Relegation to Football League One

Source: RSSSF
Rules for classification: In the Football League goals scored (F) takes precedence over goal difference (GD).
(C) Champions; (O) Play-off winners; (P) Promoted; (R) Relegated
Notes:

Leading goalscorer: Jamie Cureton (Colchester United) – 23

=== Football League One ===
With club physiotherapist Nigel Adkins promoted to the manager's role, Scunthorpe United topped the league as champions, having been in the bottom two divisions since the early 1960s. Prolific striker Billy Sharp was the also the division's leading marksman with 30 goals. Gary Johnson helped Bristol City achieve automatic-promotion after nearly a decade of near-misses and 2 play-off defeats, ending their eight-year exile from the Championship. Blackpool won the play-offs, ending nearly three decades in the bottom two divisions.

Brentford, who lost their manager Martin Allen just before the start of the season, finished bottom, having a dismal run of 21 games without a win. Rotherham won their first few games, wiping out their ten-point deduction early in the season; they ended up finishing thirteen points adrift however, and were relegated. Having started the decade in the Premier League, Bradford City fell into the bottom division for the first time in twenty-five years, with Chesterfield occupying the final relegation spot.

Pos	Team	Pld	W	D	L	GF	GA	GD	Pts	Promotion, qualification or relegation
1	Scunthorpe United (C, P)	46	26	13	7	73	35	+38	91	Promotion to Football League Championship
2	Bristol City (P)	46	25	10	11	63	39	+24	85	Promotion to Football League Championship
3	Blackpool (O, P)	46	24	11	11	76	49	+27	83	Qualification for League One play-offs
4	Nottingham Forest	46	23	13	10	65	41	+24	82	Qualification for League One play-offs
5	Yeovil Town	46	23	10	13	55	39	+16	79	Qualification for League One play-offs
6	Oldham Athletic	46	21	12	13	69	47	+22	75	Qualification for League One play-offs
7	Swansea City	46	20	12	14	69	53	+16	72	
8	Carlisle United	46	19	11	16	54	55	−1	68	
9	Tranmere Rovers	46	18	13	15	58	53	+5	67	
10	Millwall	46	19	9	18	59	62	−3	66	
11	Doncaster Rovers	46	16	15	15	52	47	+5	63	
12	Port Vale	46	18	6	22	64	65	−1	60	
13	Crewe Alexandra	46	17	9	20	66	72	−6	60	
14	Northampton Town	46	15	14	17	48	51	−3	59	
15	Huddersfield Town	46	14	17	15	60	69	−9	59	
16	Gillingham	46	17	8	21	56	77	−21	59	
17	Cheltenham Town	46	15	9	22	49	61	−12	54	
18	Brighton & Hove Albion	46	14	11	21	49	58	−9	53	
19	Bournemouth	46	13	13	20	50	64	−14	52	
20	Leyton Orient	46	12	15	19	61	77	−16	51	
21	Chesterfield (R)	46	12	11	23	45	53	−8	47	Relegation to Football League Two
22	Bradford City (R)	46	11	14	21	47	65	−18	47	Relegation to Football League Two
23	Rotherham United (R)	46	13	9	24	58	75	−17	38 (Note: Rotherham United had 10 points deducted for entering financial administration.)	Relegation to Football League Two
24	Brentford (R)	46	8	13	25	40	79	−39	37	Relegation to Football League Two

Rules for classification: In the Football League goals scored (GF) takes precedence over goal difference (GD).
(C) Champions; (O) Play-off winners; (P) Promoted; (R) Relegated
Notes:

Leading goalscorer: Billy Sharp (Scunthorpe United) – 30

=== Football League Two ===
The four teams relegated from League One in 2005–06 would occupy the top four this season, sending Walsall, Hartlepool United and Swindon Town back up. Bristol Rovers won the play-offs however, returning to League One after six years.

Torquay United had been both the last team to finish bottom under the old election system, and the last team to finish bottom of the League and survive due to the Conference champions not having a good enough ground. However, this season they finished bottom and dropped out of the League. They were joined by Boston United, who had voluntary arrangements in the 87th minute of the season's final game, but would still have been relegated even without the 10-point administration penalty. In a first since the introduction of automatic promotion and relegation between the Football League and Conference, Boston were relegated two divisions due to failing to pay footballing creditors, along with financial irregularities committed during their promotion season in 2001–02.

Pos	Team	Pld	W	D	L	GF	GA	GD	Pts	Promotion, qualification or relegation
1	Walsall (C, P)	46	25	14	7	66	34	+32	89	Promotion to Football League One
2	Hartlepool United (P)	46	26	10	10	65	40	+25	88	Promotion to Football League One
3	Swindon Town (P)	46	25	10	11	58	38	+20	85	Promotion to Football League One
4	Milton Keynes Dons	46	25	9	12	76	58	+18	84	Qualification for League Two play-offs
5	Lincoln City	46	21	11	14	70	59	+11	74	Qualification for League Two play-offs
6	Bristol Rovers (O, P)	46	20	12	14	49	42	+7	72	Qualification for League Two play-offs
7	Shrewsbury Town	46	18	17	11	68	46	+22	71	Qualification for League Two play-offs
8	Stockport County	46	21	8	17	65	54	+11	71	
9	Rochdale	46	18	12	16	70	50	+20	66	
10	Peterborough United	46	18	11	17	70	61	+9	65	
11	Darlington	46	17	14	15	52	56	−4	65	
12	Wycombe Wanderers	46	16	14	16	52	47	+5	62	
13	Notts County	46	16	14	16	55	53	+2	62	
14	Barnet	46	16	11	19	55	70	−15	59	
15	Grimsby Town	46	17	8	21	57	73	−16	59	
16	Hereford United	46	14	13	19	45	53	−8	55	
17	Mansfield Town	46	14	12	20	58	63	−5	54	
18	Chester City	46	13	14	19	40	48	−8	53	
19	Wrexham	46	13	12	21	43	65	−22	51	
20	Accrington Stanley	46	13	11	22	70	81	−11	50	
21	Bury	46	13	11	22	46	61	−15	50	
22	Macclesfield Town	46	12	12	22	55	77	−22	48	
23	Boston United (R)	46	12	10	24	51	80	−29	36 (Note: Boston United had 10 points deducted for entering a Company Voluntary Arrangement. They were relegated directly to the Conference North for not paying their footballing creditors.)	Relegation to Conference North
24	Torquay United (R)	46	7	14	25	36	63	−27	35	Relegation to Football Conference

Rules for classification: In the Football League goals scored (GF) takes precedence over goal difference (GD).
(C) Champions; (O) Play-off winners; (P) Promoted; (R) Relegated
Notes:

Leading goalscorer: Izale McLeod (Milton Keynes Dons) – 21

== Monthly awards ==
Month	Premiership		Championship		League One		League Two	
	Manager	Player	Manager	Player	Manager	Player	Manager	Player
August	Alex Ferguson; Manchester United	Ryan Giggs; Manchester United	Dave Jones; Cardiff City	Gareth Bale; Southampton	Colin Calderwood; Nottingham Forest	Leon Constantine; Port Vale	Dennis Wise; Swindon Town	Christian Roberts; Swindon Town
September	Steve Coppell; Reading	Andy Johnson; Everton	Geraint Williams; Colchester United	Michael Chopra; Cardiff City	Brian Laws; Scunthorpe United	Nicky Maynard; Crewe Alexandra	Danny Wilson; Hartlepool United	Mark Stallard; Lincoln City
October	Alex Ferguson; Manchester United	Paul Scholes; Manchester United	Steve Cotterill; Burnley	Diomansy Kamara; West Bromwich Albion	Alan Knill; Rotherham United	Billy Sharp; Scunthorpe United	John Schofield; Lincoln City	Jamie Forrester; Lincoln City
November	Steve Coppell; Reading	Cristiano Ronaldo; Manchester United	Billy Davies; Derby County	Darel Russell; Stoke City	John Sheridan; Oldham Athletic	Kris Commons; Nottingham Forest	Richard Money; Walsall	Steve Phillips; Bristol Rovers
December	Sam Allardyce; Bolton Wanderers	Cristiano Ronaldo; Manchester United	Steve Bruce; Birmingham City	Jason Koumas; West Bromwich Albion	Simon Grayson; Blackpool	Paul Heffernan; Doncaster Rovers	Paul Ince; Macclesfield Town	Dimitrios Konstantopoulos; Hartlepool United
January	Rafael Benítez; Liverpool	Cesc Fàbregas; Arsenal	Billy Davies; Derby County	David Nugent; Preston North End	Sean O'Driscoll; Doncaster Rovers	Enoch Showunmi; Bristol City	Paul Sturrock; Swindon Town	Michael Nelson; Hartlepool United
February	Alex Ferguson; Manchester United	Ryan Giggs; Manchester United	Roy Keane; Sunderland	Stephen Ward; Wolverhampton Wanderers	Nigel Adkins; Scunthorpe United	Joe Murphy; Scunthorpe United	Danny Wilson; Hartlepool United	Wayne Hennessey; Stockport County
March	José Mourinho; Chelsea	Petr Čech; Chelsea	Roy Keane; Sunderland		Gary Johnson; Bristol City		Danny Wilson; Hartlepool United	
April	Martin O'Neill; Aston Villa	Dimitar Berbatov & Robbie Keane; Tottenham Hotspur	Tony Pulis; Stoke City		Simon Grayson; Blackpool		Paul Trollope; Bristol Rovers	

== Women's football ==
=== Women's Premier League ===
==== National Division ====
Pos	Team	Pld	W	D	L	GF	GA	GD	Pts	Qualification or relegation
1	Arsenal (C)	22	22	0	0	119	10	+109	66	Qualification for the UEFA Cup qualifying round (Note: Because Arsenal won the 2006-07 European Cup, Everton qualified as League runner-up.)
2	Everton	22	17	1	4	56	15	+41	52	Qualification for the UEFA Cup qualifying round
3	Charlton Athletic	22	16	2	4	63	32	+31	50	
4	Bristol Academy	22	13	1	8	53	41	+12	40	
5	Leeds United	22	12	1	9	50	44	+6	37	
6	Blackburn Rovers	22	10	2	10	37	36	+1	32	
7	Birmingham City	22	8	4	10	34	29	+5	28	
8	Chelsea	22	8	4	10	33	34	−1	28	
9	Doncaster Rovers Belles	22	7	2	13	29	54	−25	23	
10	Cardiff City	22	3	3	16	26	64	−38	12	Qualification for the UEFA Cup qualifying round (Note: Qualified by winning the Welsh Women's Cup.)
11	Sunderland (R)	22	3	2	17	15	72	−57	11	Relegation to the Northern Division
12	Fulham (R)	22	1	2	19	12	96	−84	5	Relegation to the Southern Division

Source: FA WPL
(C) Champions; (R) Relegated

==== Northern Division ====
Pos	Team	Pld	W	D	L	GF	GA	GD	Pts	Promotion or relegation
1	Liverpool (C, P)	22	16	2	4	56	17	+39	50	Promotion to the National Division
2	Lincoln City	22	13	6	3	50	23	+27	45	
3	Nottingham Forest	22	11	3	8	41	36	+5	36	
4	Crewe Alexandra	22	10	4	8	33	38	−5	34	
5	Preston North End	22	9	6	7	36	41	−5	33	
6	Tranmere Rovers	22	9	4	9	41	34	+7	31	
7	Newcastle United	22	8	5	9	37	34	+3	29	
8	Stockport County	22	8	4	10	34	36	−2	28	
9	Aston Villa	22	6	6	10	36	43	−7	24	
10	Manchester City	22	6	6	10	27	35	−8	24	
11	Wolverhampton Wanderers (R)	22	5	6	11	26	44	−18	21	Relegation to the Midland Combination League
12	Curzon Ashton (R)	22	4	2	16	24	60	−36	14	Relegation to the Northern Combination League

Source: FA WPL
(C) Champions; (P) Promoted; (R) Relegated

==== Southern Division ====
Pos	Team	Pld	W	D	L	GF	GA	GD	Pts	Promotion or relegation
1	Watford (C, P)	22	19	0	3	99	35	+64	57	Promotion to the National Division
2	Portsmouth	22	14	5	3	60	32	+28	47	
3	Millwall Lionesses	22	13	3	6	61	35	+26	42	
4	Barnet	22	11	4	7	52	33	+19	37	
5	Keynsham Town	22	11	4	7	52	46	+6	37	
6	AFC Team Bath	22	9	5	8	44	37	+7	32	
7	Reading Royals	22	10	1	11	36	34	+2	31	
8	Crystal Palace	22	7	5	10	48	48	0	26	
9	Brighton & Hove Albion	22	7	2	13	39	65	−26	23	
10	West Ham United	22	6	3	13	25	44	−19	21	
11	AFC Wimbledon (R)	22	5	2	15	26	61	−35	17	Relegation to the South East Combination League
12	Southampton Saints (R)	22	1	4	17	21	93	−72	7	Relegation to the South West Combination League

Source: FA WPL
(C) Champions; (P) Promoted; (R) Relegated

=== FA Women's Cup ===
==== Final ====
7 May 2007

Arsenal	4–1	Charlton Athletic
K. Smith 7', 80'; Ludlow 15', 45+1'	Report	Holtham 2'

City Ground, Nottingham
Attendance: 24,529
Referee: Anthony Bates (Staffordshire)

== Transfer deals ==
The summer transfer window saw many high-profile moves. These included Andriy Shevchenko and Michael Ballack joining Chelsea, and Ruud van Nistelrooy leaving Manchester United to join Real Madrid. West Ham United secured the surprise double signing of Javier Mascherano and Carlos Tevez from Corinthians, and Dietmar Hamann's transfer to Bolton Wanderers became the shortest in English footballing history.

The January transfer window was quieter than the summer, with Ashley Young's £9.65m move to Aston Villa and Matthew Upson's £6m move to West Ham United the window's most expensive.

In total, Premiership clubs spent the highest amount on transfers in the summer since the transfer window system was introduced.

== Notable debutants ==
- 25 February 2007 – Andy Carroll, 18-year-old striker, makes his debut for Newcastle United in a 1–0 away Premier League defeat by Wigan Athletic.

== Retirements ==
- 1 August 2006 – Peter Atherton (Halifax Town)
- 13 September 2006 – David Johnson (Nottingham Forest)
- 6 October 2006 – Brian O'Neil (Preston North End)
- 23 October 2006 – Steve Blatherwick (Chesterfield)
- 27 October 2006 – Peter Beagrie (Grimsby Town)
- 29 November 2006 – Mickey Evans (Torquay United)
- 6 December 2006 – Mark Kinsella (Walsall)
- 13 December 2006 – Chris Plummer (Peterborough United)
- 15 December 2006 – Steve Stone (Leeds United)
- 19 December 2006 – Thomas Gaardsøe (West Bromwich Albion)
- 9 February 2007 – Mark Clyde (Wolverhampton Wanderers)
- 1 March 2007 – Ian Stonebridge (Wycombe Wanderers)
- 8 March 2007 – Marino Keith (Colchester United)
- 11 April 2007 – Eoin Jess (Northampton Town)
- 17 May 2007 – Martin Phillips (Torquay United)
- End of season – Rufus Brevett (Oxford United)
- End of season – Alec Chamberlain (Watford)
- End of season – Gary Kelly (Leeds United)
- End of season – Jason McAteer (Tranmere Rovers)
- End of season – John McDermott (Grimsby Town)
- End of season – Ian Taylor (Northampton Town)
- 23 June 2007 – Eddie Howe (AFC Bournemouth)

== Deaths ==
- 18 July 2006 – Jimmy Leadbetter, 78, former Ipswich Town winger.
- 21 July 2006 – Bert Slater, 70, former Liverpool and Watford goalkeeper.
- 28 July 2006 – Sep Smith, 94, former Leicester City wing-half, and oldest living England international.
- 28 July 2006 – Billy Walsh, 85, former Manchester City defender, and Republic of Ireland international.
- 18 August 2006 – Norman Rowlinson, 83, former chairman of Crewe Alexandra.
- 2 September 2006 – Lionel Pickering, 74, former chairman of Derby County and noted businessman. Bought the club from Robert Maxwell in 1990 and owned it for 13 years, during which time Derby spent six seasons in the Premier League and moved into a new stadium.
- 2 September 2006 – Charlie Williams, 77, former Doncaster Rovers defender who later became a successful comedian.
- 9 September 2006 – Matt Gadsby, 27, Hinckley United defender, died on the pitch in a game against Harrogate Town.
- 9 September 2006 – Simon Patterson, 24, former Watford and Wycombe Wanderers striker, died in a car accident.
- 17 September 2006 – George Heslop, 66, former Manchester City defender.
- 1 November 2006 – Johnny Schofield, 75, former Birmingham City goalkeeper.
- 31 December 2006 – Joe Walton, 81, former Preston North End full-back.
- 8 January 2007 – Johnny Spuhler, 89, former Sunderland and Middlesbrough winger, and former manager of Shrewsbury Town.
- 20 January 2007 – Don Weston, 70, former Leeds United striker.
- 22 January 2007 – Bobby Dale, 75, former Bury and Colchester United winger, cancer.
- 23 February 2007 – John Ritchie, 65, former Stoke City striker; club's all-time top goalscorer. Played in the 1972 Football League Cup triumph.
- 24 February 2007 – Jock Dodds, 91, Blackpool striker who held the record for fastest hat-trick in English football history.
- 14 March 2007 – Tommy Cavanagh, 78, Huddersfield Town forward who later manager Brentford and Burnley, and was assistant manager at Manchester United when Dave Sexton was manager between 1977 and 1981. Died after a five-year struggle with Alzheimer's disease.
- 7 April 2007 – Brian Miller, 70, former Burnley and England international footballer. Managed the club during the late 1980s.
- 12 April 2007 – Len Hill, 65, former Newport County and Swansea City wing-half; also a first-class cricketer.
- 14 April 2007 – Bobby Cram, 67, former West Bromwich Albion and Colchester United full-back.
- 24 April 2007 – Alan Ball, 61, former England international midfielder, 1966 World Cup winner. Died from a heart attack at his home in Hampshire.
- 6 June 2007 – Warren Bradley, 73, former Manchester United and England winger.
- 24 June 2007 – Derek Dougan, 69, former Wolverhampton Wanderers and Northern Ireland forward, heart attack.

== See also ==
- 2005–06 in English football
- 2007–08 in English football
- 2006–07 Premier League
- 2006–07 Football League
- 2006–07 FA Cup
- 2006–07 Carling Cup
