= Hamer Bouazza =

Algeria international footballer (born 1985)

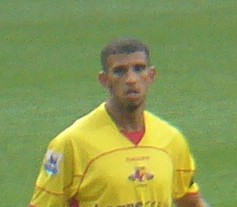
- Bouazza playing for Watford

Personal information
- Full name: Hamer Bouazza
- Date of birth: 22 February 1985 (age 41)
- Place of birth: Évry, France
- Height: 1.78 m (5 ft 10 in)
- Position: Left winger

Youth career
- 2000–2001: Auxerre
- 2001–2002: Évry
- 2002–2003: Watford

Senior career*
Years	Team	Apps	(Gls)
2003–2007	Watford	83	(8)
2005–2006	→ Swindon Town (loan)	13	(2)
2007–2009	Fulham	20	(1)
2008–2009	→ Charlton Athletic (loan)	25	(4)
2009	→ Birmingham City (loan)	16	(1)
2009	Sivasspor	0	(0)
2009–2010	Blackpool	19	(1)
2010–2011	Arles-Avignon	9	(1)
2011	→ Millwall (loan)	12	(1)
2011–2012	Millwall	26	(2)
2012	AC Omonia	0	(0)
2012–2013	Racing Santander	17	(0)
2013–2014	ES Sétif	4	(0)
2014–2017	Red Star	80	(20)
2017	Étoile du Sahel	11	(1)
2017	Tours	16	(0)
2017	Tours B	2	(0)
2017–2018	FC Fleury 91	1	(0)
Total		354	(42)

International career
2007–2013	Algeria	21	(3)
- * Club domestic league appearances and goals

Hamer Bouazza (Arabic: عامر بوعزة; born 22 February 1985) is a former professional footballer who played as a left winger.

Bouazza spent most of his football career in England, having also played in Turkey, France, Cyprus, Spain, Algeria and Tunisia.

An Algerian international between 2007 and 2013, Bouazza played for his country in two editions of the Africa Cup of Nations: 2010 in Angola and 2013 in South Africa.

== Early life ==
Hamer Bouazza was born on 22 February 1985 in Évry, Essonne in France. He grew up in Évry with his parents, two brothers and two sisters. In October 2005, speaking about his early life, Bouazza said: "Sometimes I didn't go to school because all that I wanted was to play football. It was football, football. I started playing at nine and when I was 15 I got a chance with Auxerre. It did not go well and after a year I returned to Évry."

== Club career ==
=== Watford ===
In 2003, at the age of 16, Bouazza moved to England having won a scholarship at Watford following a trial.

He made his first team debut as an 88th-minute substitute on 7 February 2004 in a 2–2 with Sunderland at Vicarage Road. A week later, he scored on his full debut, a 2–0 home win over Preston North End. He made a total of nine appearances in the 2003–04 season. The following season, he made 28 league and eight cup appearances, scoring three goals. During the 2005–06 season, Bouazza was overshadowed by Darius Henderson, Marlon King, and Ashley Young and missed a lengthy spell with a broken metatarsal but still tallied three goals in nineteen games, one of which was the fourth in Watford's 4–1 win over Championship runners-up Sheffield United.

On 6 October 2005, Bouazza was loaned out to League One club Swindon Town, initially for one month, but later extended to the end of the year. He scored three goals in 15 games for Swindon.

Bouazza broke his metatarsal during a Watford home game against Derby County on 4 March 2006, and had the bone pinned in an operation. On 21 May 2006, he played in Watford's 3–0 win over Leeds United in the Championship play-off final at the Millennium Stadium, Cardiff, coming on as a 72nd-minute substitute.

Throughout the 2006–07 season, with Watford in the Premier League, Bouazza started most league games, principally as a left-sided winger, scoring five goals and winning the club's "Young Player of the Season award".

=== Fulham ===
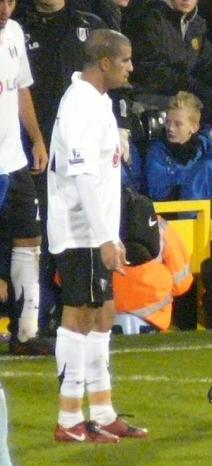
Bouazza playing for Fulham in 2007

On 8 August 2007, Bouazza joined Premier League club Fulham on a four-year contract for an initial fee of £3m (potentially rising to £4m, depending on appearances and Fulham's divisional status). He his debut in a 2–1 defeat to Arsenal on 12 August. However, after just three appearances he dislocated his shoulder in a 2–1 defeat to Middlesbrough on 18 August. He returned to the Fulham starting XI after a couple of weeks out, and scored his first Fulham goal with a close-range free kick against Manchester City in a 3–3 draw at Craven Cottage on 22 September 2007. He made 22 appearances for Fulham in the 2007–08 season, scoring one goal.

On 9 August 2008, he signed for Championship club Charlton Athletic on a season-long loan, making his debut later that day as an 83rd-minute substitute in a 3–0 win over Swansea City at The Valley. He scored his first goal for the Addicks on 23 August in a 4–2 home win over Reading.

On 8 January 2009, after a total of 27 appearances and four goals at Charlton, Fulham activated a recall clause in the loan agreement and immediately loaned him to another Championship side, Birmingham City, for the remainder of the season. Bouazza made his Birmingham debut in their next league game, a 1–1 draw at home to Cardiff City on 17 January, and scored his first goal, a clever finish after a defensive error, in a 2–0 win over Doncaster Rovers at the Keepmoat Stadium on 14 March. He made a total of 16 appearances for Birmingham, helping them win promotion to the Premier League as Championship runners-up.

=== Sivasspor ===
On 18 August 2009 Bouazza signed for Turkish Süper Lig club Sivasspor. However, his stay in Sivas was short lived, lasting only five days. He played one game for the club, a 3–0 home defeat to Shahktar Donetsk in the Europa League play-off round.

On 23 August, he left Sivasspor, stating that he did not wish to remain in Turkey, and agreeing a mutual termination of his contract. Sivasspor head-coach Bulent Uygun said they had to release Bouazza as they didn't want him to damage the morale of the team.

=== Blackpool ===
On 1 September 2009, Bouazza signed for Championship club Blackpool on a one-year contract with an option for a further year. He made his debut on 12 September as a 73rd-minute substitute in a 2–1 defeat to Leicester City at the Walkers Stadium. He made his full debut four days later in the Seasiders' 2–1 win over Newcastle United at Bloomfield Road. His first goal came on 26 September, in a 2–0 home win over Peterborough United, when he nutmegged defender Tom Williams before curling the ball into the net from a tight angle.

In January 2010, Bouazza's goal against Peterborough was voted by Blackpool supporters the best goal of 2009, and so became the club's nominated goal for the Goal of the Year at the annual Football League Awards to be held on 14 March. He missed the whole of January, while he was away in the Africa Cup of Nations in Angola. However, on his return to Blackpool in early February it was discovered that he had picked up an injury in the tournament, believed to be a hernia. His return to action came on 16 February as an 81st-minute substitute in the 2–0 home win over Middlesbrough, when he set up D. J. Campbell to score Blackpool's second goal in injury time. He was released at the end of the season.

=== Millwall ===
On 28 January 2011, Bouazza was loaned out by AC Arles-Avignon to Millwall until the end of the season. Bouazza made his debut for Millwall on 19 February. He came on as a substitute and scored a curling free-kick after being on the field for only 10 minutes, in a 3–2 home defeat to Middlesbrough. Millwall completed the permanent signing of Bouazza on 19 April on a two-year contract, for a fee believed to be in the region of €100,000.

=== AC Omonia ===
On 22 June 2012, Bouazza signed for Cypriot First Division club AC Omonia on a one-year contract, despite having initially rejected a contract offer from the club. However, he left the club in August, having only been in Cyprus for a few weeks.

=== Racing Santander ===
In September 2012, Bouazza moved to Spain, joining Segunda División side Racing Santander. In December, following a 1–0 defeat against Sabadell, Bouazza was chased by three masked men, leading to a confrontation outside of his home. He left the club after his contract expired at the end of the season, and had a trial with Scottish team Rangers in the summer of 2013.

=== Later career ===
In December 2013 he made his debut for Algerian side ES Sétif and made three further appearances before leaving to join Championnat National team Red Star. He appeared in 80 matches and scored 20 goals across three seasons, with the majority coming in Ligue 2 following Red Star's promotion in Bouazza's debut season. In January 2017, Bouazza joined Tunisian Ligue Professionnelle 1 side Étoile du Sahel.

== International career ==
=== Early career ===
Although born in France, Bouazza was approached by the Algerian Football Federation, to play at national level for them. Bouazza accepted, explaining later: "I grew up in Paris, yes, but I've always known my nationality. I am Algerian, just as my father and mother are. My grandmother lives just outside Algiers, and I have many cousins there."

Bouazza made his debut for Algeria against Libya on 7 February 2007 and scored his first goal in a 3–2 victory over Mali on 20 November 2007.

=== 2010 World Cup and 2010 Africa Cup of Nations qualification ===
Bouazza played in Algeria's opening second round qualification game for the 2010 World Cup, a 1–0 loss to Senegal on 31 May 2008 at the Stade Leopold Senghor, Dakar, Senegal, coming on as a second-half substitute. However, he didn't make any further appearances as Algeria won group Six and progressed to the third round. He then played in the opening third-round game, an away 0–0 draw with Rwanda on 28 March 2009, again as a substitute. He continued to be used as a second-half substitute in Algeria's next three qualifying games, a 3–1 win over Egypt on 7 June, a 2–0 away win over Zambia on 20 June and a 1–0 home win over Zambia on 6 September, a result which booked Algeria a place at the 2010 Africa Cup of Nations.

On 13 November, as the Algerian squad arrived in Cairo for their vital World Cup qualifier against Egypt the following day, their team bus was attacked by stone-throwers. Three players were injured by flying glass, although Bouazza himself was not. Speaking later about the attack, Bouazza said: "I had a very bad feeling when we landed at the airport because there was no security. And when our coach was attacked on the road from the airport to the city, it was the most terrifying experience of my life. People threw rocks at us, and there was nobody to stop them. Some of the players were hit by flying glass and I only escaped because I was lying on the floor. That is no way to prepare for a World Cup match."

=== 2010 Africa Cup of Nations finals ===
In January 2010 Bouazza was in the Algeria squad at the Africa Cup of Nations finals in Angola, as they reached the semi-finals; finishing the tournament in 4th place.

He was a second-half substitute in Algeria's first two Group A matches at the Estádio 11 de Novembro in Luanda, a 0–3 defeat to Malawi on 11 January, and a 1–0 victory over Mali, three days later. His first start in the tournament came in Algeria's final group game, a 0–0 draw with Angola on 18 January at the same venue; a result which saw Algeria qualify for the quarter-finals.

On 24 January Bouazza scored the winning goal against Ivory Coast, to ensure Algeria qualified for the semi-finals. Just two minutes after coming on as a substitute at the start of extra time, with the scores level at 2–2, Bouazza's headed goal gave Algeria the lead and with it a 3–2 victory. Four days later he was an unused substitute as Algeria lost their semi-final 0–4 to North African rivals Egypt, but started the 3rd place play-off on 30 January, which they lost 0–1 to Nigeria at the Ombaka National Stadium in Benguela. He made a total of five appearances in the tournament in Angola, three of them as a substitute.

== Personal life ==
Bouazza is a practising Muslim. He observes ramadan each year, fasting during daylight hours for a month. He has admitted fasting can be hard, but said it was part of his faith. "I'm proud to be a Muslim. I'm not going to say (combining fasting and football) is easy. Ramadan is hard, and I try to do my best every time. You know God is there to help us, we believe in Him. We just need to pray and believe in Him."

== Career statistics ==
=== Club ===
Appearances and goals by club, season and competition
Club	Season	League			National Cup		League Cup		Continental		Other		Total	
Club	Season	Division	Apps	Goals	Apps	Goals	Apps	Goals	Apps	Goals	Apps	Goals	Apps	Goals
Watford	2003–04	First Division	9	1	0	0	0	0	–		–		9	1
Watford	2004–05	Championship	28	1	2	0	6	2	–		–		36	3
Watford	2005–06	Championship	14	1	0	0	2	1	–		1 (Note: Appearance in Championship play-offs)	0	17	2
Watford	2006–07	Premier League	32	5	4	2	2	0	–		–		38	7
Watford	Total		83	8	6	2	10	3	0	0	1	0	100	13
Swindon Town (loan)	2005–06	League One	13	2	–		–		–		2 (Note: Appearances in Football League Trophy)	1	15	3
Fulham	2007–08	Premier League	20	1	1	0	1	0	–		–		22	1
Fulham	2008–09	Premier League	0	0	–		–		–		–		0	0
Fulham	Total		20	1	1	0	1	0	0	0	0	0	22	1
Charlton Athletic (loan)	2008–09	Championship	25	4	1	0	1	0	–		–		27	4
Birmingham City (loan)	2008–09	Championship	16	1	–		–		–		–		16	1
Sivasspor	2009–10	Süper Lig	–		–		–		1 (Note: Appearance in UEFA Europa League)	0	–		1	0
Blackpool	2009–10	Championship	19	1	0	0	1	0	–		–		20	1
Arles-Avignon	2010–11	Ligue 1	9	1	0	0	0	0	–		–		9	1
Millwall (loan)	2010–11	Championship	12	1	–		–		–		–		12	1
Millwall	2011–12	Championship	26	2	3	0	3	1	–		–		32	3
Racing Santander	2012–13	Segunda División	17	0	2	1	–		–		–		19	1
ES Sétif	2013–14	Algerian Ligue Professionnelle 1	4	0	1	0	–		–		–		5	0
Red Star	2014–15	National	28	7	4	3	–		–		–		32	10
Red Star	2015–16	Ligue 2	35	10	0	0	1	0	–		–		36	10
Red Star	2016–17	Ligue 2	17	3	1	0	1	0	–		–		19	3
Red Star	Total		80	20	5	3	2	0	0	0	0	0	87	23
Étoile du Sahel	2016–17	Tunisian Ligue Professionnelle 11	11	1	1	0	–		5	3	–		17	4
Tours	2017–18	Ligue 2	16	0	0	0	2	2	–		–		18	2
Tours B	2017–18	National 3	2	0	0	0	–		–		–		2	0
FC Fleury 91	2017–18	National 2	1	0	1	0	–		–		–		2	0
Career total			354	42	21	6	20	6	6	3	3	1	404	58

=== International ===
Appearances and goals by national team and year
National team	Year	Apps	Goals
Algeria	2007	3	1
Algeria	2008	2	0
Algeria	2009	5	0
Algeria	2010	4	1
Algeria	2011	2	1
Algeria	2012	3	0
Algeria	2013	2	0
Total		21	3

Scores and results list Algeria's goal tally first, score column indicates score after each Bouazza goal

List of international goals scored by Hamer Bouazza
No.	Date	Venue	Opponent	Score	Result	Competition	Ref.
1	20 November 2007	Stade Robert Diochon, Rouen, France	Mali	1–0	3–2	Friendly	
2	24 January 2010	Estádio Nacional do Chiazi, Cabinda, Angola	Ivory Coast	3–2	3–2 (a.e.t.)	2010 Africa Cup of Nations	
3	3 September 2011	Benjamin Mkapa National Stadium, Dar es Salaam, Tanzania	Tanzania	1–1	1–1	2012 Africa Cup of Nations qualification	

== Honours ==
Watford

- Football League Championship play-offs: 2006

Birmingham City

- Football League Championship second-place promotion: 2008–09
