= 2006–07 FA Premier League =

English football season

FA Premier League
- Season: 2006–07
- Dates: 19 August 2006 – 13 May 2007
- Champions: Manchester United; 9th Premier League title 16th English title
- Relegated: Sheffield United; Charlton Athletic; Watford
- Champions League: Manchester United; Chelsea; Liverpool; Arsenal
- UEFA Cup: Tottenham Hotspur; Everton; Bolton Wanderers
- Intertoto Cup: Blackburn Rovers
- Matches: 380
- Goals: 931 (2.45 per match)
- Top goalscorer: Didier Drogba (20 goals)
- Best goalkeeper: Pepe Reina (19 clean sheets)
- Biggest home win: Reading 6–0 West Ham United (1 January 2007)
- Biggest away win: Middlesbrough 0–4 Portsmouth (28 August 2006); Reading 0–4 Arsenal (22 October 2006); Bolton Wanderers 0–4 Manchester United (28 October 2006); Wigan Athletic 0–4 Liverpool (2 December 2006); Tottenham Hotspur 0–4 Manchester United (4 February 2007)
- Highest scoring: Arsenal 6–2 Blackburn Rovers (23 December 2006)
- Longest winning run: 9 games Chelsea
- Longest unbeaten run: 14 games Chelsea
- Longest winless run: 11 games Aston Villa; Watford; West Ham United
- Longest losing run: 8 games Wigan Athletic
- Highest attendance: 76,098; Manchester United 4–1 Blackburn Rovers (31 March 2007)
- Lowest attendance: 13,760; Watford 2–1 Blackburn Rovers (23 January 2007)
- Total attendance: 13,058,755
- Average attendance: 34,365

The 2006–07 FA Premier League (known as the FA Barclays Premiership for sponsorship reasons) was the 15th season of the FA Premier League since its establishment in 1992. The season started on 19 August 2006 and concluded on 13 May 2007. Chelsea were the two-time defending champions.

On 12 February 2007, the FA Premier League renamed itself simply to the Premier League. The change introduced a new logo, sleeve patches and typeface. The sponsored name remains the Barclays Premier League.

The 2006–07 season was the lowest-scoring season in Premier League history, with only 931 goals (with a 2.45 goals per match ratio, the poorest in the history of Premier League).

Manchester United won their first Premiership title since 2003, following Chelsea's 1–1 draw with Arsenal on 6 May 2007. The result left the defending champions seven points behind United with two games left. It was their ninth title in fifteen seasons.

The three relegation spots were occupied by Watford and Sheffield United who each lasted one season in the league, along with Charlton Athletic who went down after seven seasons.

== Teams ==
Twenty teams competed in the league – the top seventeen teams from the previous season and the three teams promoted from the Championship. The promoted teams were Reading (playing in the top flight for the first time ever), Sheffield United (playing top flight football for the first time in twelve years) and Watford (returning to the Premier League after a six-year absence). They replaced Birmingham City, West Bromwich Albion and Sunderland, who were relegated to the Championship after their top flight spells of four, two and one year respectively.

=== Stadiums and locations ===
Locations of the 2006–07 Premier League teams
Greater London Premier League football clubs
Greater Manchester Premier League football clubs

Team	Location	Stadium	Capacity
Arsenal	London (Holloway)	Emirates Stadium (Note: Arsenal moved to the larger 60,000-seat Emirates Stadium after 93 years at Arsenal Stadium.)	60,600
Aston Villa	Birmingham	Villa Park	42,553
Blackburn Rovers	Blackburn	Ewood Park	31,367
Bolton Wanderers	Bolton	Reebok Stadium	28,723
Charlton Athletic	London (Charlton)	The Valley	27,111
Chelsea	London (Fulham)	Stamford Bridge	42,360
Everton	Liverpool (Walton)	Goodison Park	40,569
Fulham	London (Fulham)	Craven Cottage	24,600
Liverpool	Liverpool (Anfield)	Anfield	45,276
Manchester City	Manchester (Bradford)	City of Manchester Stadium	48,000
Manchester United	Manchester (Old Trafford)	Old Trafford	76,212 (Note: Old Trafford is now a fully completed 76,000-seater stadium, making it the largest club stadium in the UK.)
Middlesbrough	Middlesbrough	Riverside Stadium	35,049
Newcastle United	Newcastle upon Tyne	St James' Park	52,387
Portsmouth	Portsmouth	Fratton Park	20,220
Reading	Reading	Madejski Stadium (Note: The Madejski Stadium was a new Premier League ground for this season, Reading's first in the competition.)	24,250
Sheffield United	Sheffield	Bramall Lane	32,609
Tottenham Hotspur	London (Tottenham)	White Hart Lane	36,240
Watford	Watford	Vicarage Road	19,920
West Ham United	London (Upton Park)	Boleyn Ground	35,146
Wigan Athletic	Wigan	JJB Stadium	25,138

=== Personnel and kits ===
(as of 13 May 2007)

Team	Manager	Captain	Kit manufacturer	Shirt sponsor
Arsenal	(France) Arsène Wenger	(France) Thierry Henry	Nike	Fly Emirates
Aston Villa	(Northern Ireland) Martin O'Neill	(England) Gareth Barry	Hummel	32red.com
Blackburn Rovers	(Wales) Mark Hughes	(New Zealand) Ryan Nelsen	Lonsdale	bet24.com
Bolton Wanderers	(England) Sammy Lee	(England) Kevin Nolan	Reebok	Reebok
Charlton Athletic	(England) Alan Pardew	(England) Luke Young	Joma	Llanera
Chelsea	(Portugal) José Mourinho	(England) John Terry	Adidas	Samsung Mobile
Everton	(Scotland) David Moyes	(England) Phil Neville	Umbro	Chang
Fulham	(Northern Ireland) Lawrie Sanchez	(United States) Brian McBride	Airness	Pipex
Liverpool	(Spain) Rafael Benítez	(England) Steven Gerrard	Adidas	Carlsberg
Manchester City	(England) Stuart Pearce	(Republic of Ireland) Richard Dunne	Reebok	Thomas Cook
Manchester United	(Scotland) Sir Alex Ferguson	(England) Gary Neville	Nike	AIG
Middlesbrough	(England) Gareth Southgate	(Netherlands) George Boateng	Erreà	888.com
Newcastle United	(England) Nigel Pearson (caretaker)	(England) Scott Parker	Adidas	Northern Rock
Portsmouth	(England) Harry Redknapp	(Serbia) Dejan Stefanović	Jako	Oki
Reading	(England) Steve Coppell	(Scotland) Graeme Murty	Puma	Kyocera
Sheffield United	(England) Neil Warnock	(England) Chris Morgan	Le Coq Sportif	Capital One
Tottenham Hotspur	(Netherlands) Martin Jol	(England) Ledley King	Puma	Mansion.com
Watford	(England) Aidy Boothroyd	(England) Gavin Mahon	Diadora	loans.co.uk
West Ham United	(England) Alan Curbishley	(England) Nigel Reo-Coker	Reebok	Jobserve
Wigan Athletic	(England) Paul Jewell	(Netherlands) Arjan De Zeeuw	JJB	JJB

=== Managerial changes ===
Team	Outgoing manager	Manner of departure	Date of vacancy	Position in table	Incoming manager	Date of appointment
Charlton Athletic	(England) Alan Curbishley	End of contract	24 April 2006	Pre-season	(Northern Ireland) Iain Dowie	27 May 2006
Middlesbrough	(England) Steve McClaren	Signed by England	4 May 2006	Pre-season	(England) Gareth Southgate	7 June 2006
Aston Villa	(Republic of Ireland) David O'Leary	Sacked	19 July 2006	Pre-season	(Northern Ireland) Martin O'Neill	4 August 2006
Charlton Athletic	(Northern Ireland) Iain Dowie	Sacked	13 November 2006	20th	(England) Les Reed	13 November 2006
West Ham United	(England) Alan Pardew	Sacked	11 December 2006	18th	(England) Alan Curbishley	13 December 2006
Charlton Athletic	(England) Les Reed	Sacked	20 December 2006	19th	(England) Alan Pardew	24 December 2006
Fulham	(Wales) Chris Coleman	Sacked	10 April 2007	15th	(Northern Ireland) Lawrie Sanchez	10 April 2007
Bolton Wanderers	(England) Sam Allardyce	Resigned	29 April 2007	5th	(England) Sammy Lee	30 April 2007
Newcastle United	(England) Glenn Roeder	Resigned	6 May 2007	13th	(England) Nigel Pearson (caretaker)	6 May 2007

== League table ==
Pos	Team	Pld	W	D	L	GF	GA	GD	Pts	Qualification or relegation
1	Manchester United (C)	38	28	5	5	83	27	+56	89	Qualification for the Champions League group stage
2	Chelsea	38	24	11	3	64	24	+40	83	Qualification for the Champions League group stage
3	Liverpool	38	20	8	10	57	27	+30	68	Qualification for the Champions League third qualifying round
4	Arsenal	38	19	11	8	63	35	+28	68	Qualification for the Champions League third qualifying round
5	Tottenham Hotspur	38	17	9	12	57	54	+3	60	Qualification for the UEFA Cup first round (Note: Since both finalists of the FA Cup (Manchester United and Chelsea) and the League Cup winners (Chelsea) were qualified for the Champions League, their UEFA Cup spots were given to the 6th- and 7th-placed Premier League teams.)
6	Everton	38	15	13	10	52	36	+16	58	Qualification for the UEFA Cup first round
7	Bolton Wanderers	38	16	8	14	47	52	−5	56	Qualification for the UEFA Cup first round
8	Reading	38	16	7	15	52	47	+5	55	
9	Portsmouth	38	14	12	12	45	42	+3	54	
10	Blackburn Rovers	38	15	7	16	52	54	−2	52	Qualification for the Intertoto Cup third round (Note: The highest-placed team who applied for the Intertoto Cup and not in an automatic UEFA Cup spot was awarded with a place in that competition. Blackburn Rovers occupied the Intertoto place, because Portsmouth and Reading did not apply. A further place in the UEFA Cup was up for grabs via the Premiership Fair Play League. The winner is placed into a draw with the winners of Fair Play leagues in other countries. The representatives from the two countries that come out of the hat first are given a place in the UEFA Cup first qualifying round. Since the winners of the Premiership Fair Play League, Tottenham Hotspur, had already qualified for the UEFA Cup by virtue of their league position, their place in the Fair Play draw was given to Aston Villa. However, the places in the UEFA Cup were awarded to the representatives from Finland and Norway.)
11	Aston Villa	38	11	17	10	43	41	+2	50	
12	Middlesbrough	38	12	10	16	44	49	−5	46	
13	Newcastle United	38	11	10	17	38	47	−9	43	
14	Manchester City	38	11	9	18	29	44	−15	42	
15	West Ham United	38	12	5	21	35	59	−24	41	
16	Fulham	38	8	15	15	38	60	−22	39	
17	Wigan Athletic	38	10	8	20	37	59	−22	38	
18	Sheffield United (R)	38	10	8	20	32	55	−23	38	Relegation to Football League Championship
19	Charlton Athletic (R)	38	8	10	20	34	60	−26	34	Relegation to Football League Championship
20	Watford (R)	38	5	13	20	29	59	−30	28	Relegation to Football League Championship

Source: Barclays Premier League
Rules for classification: 1) points; 2) goal difference; 3) number of goals scored.
(C) Champions; (R) Relegated

== Results ==
Home \ Away	ARS	AVL	BLB	BOL	CHA	CHE	EVE	FUL	LIV	MCI	MUN	MID	NEW	POR	REA	SHU	TOT	WAT	WHU	WIG
Arsenal		1–1	6–2	2–1	4–0	1–1	1–1	3–1	3–0	3–1	2–1	1–1	1–1	2–2	2–1	3–0	3–0	3–0	0–1	2–1
Aston Villa	0–1		2–0	0–1	2–0	0–0	1–1	1–1	0–0	1–3	0–3	1–1	2–0	0–0	2–1	3–0	1–1	2–0	1–0	1–1
Blackburn Rovers	0–2	1–2		0–1	4–1	0–2	1–1	2–0	1–0	4–2	0–1	2–1	1–3	3–0	3–3	2–1	1–1	3–1	1–2	2–1
Bolton Wanderers	3–1	2–2	1–2		1–1	0–1	1–1	2–1	2–0	0–0	0–4	0–0	2–1	3–2	1–3	1–0	2–0	1–0	4–0	0–1
Charlton Athletic	1–2	2–1	1–0	2–0		0–1	1–1	2–2	0–3	1–0	0–3	1–3	2–0	0–1	0–0	1–1	0–2	0–0	4–0	1–0
Chelsea	1–1	1–1	3–0	2–2	2–1		1–1	2–2	1–0	3–0	0–0	3–0	1–0	2–1	2–2	3–0	1–0	4–0	1–0	4–0
Everton	1–0	0–1	1–0	1–0	2–1	2–3		4–1	3–0	1–1	2–4	0–0	3–0	3–0	1–1	2–0	1–2	2–1	2–0	2–2
Fulham	2–1	1–1	1–1	1–1	2–1	0–2	1–0		1–0	1–3	1–2	2–1	2–1	1–1	0–1	1–0	1–1	0–0	0–0	0–1
Liverpool	4–1	3–1	1–1	3–0	2–2	2–0	0–0	4–0		1–0	0–1	2–0	2–0	0–0	2–0	4–0	3–0	2–0	2–1	2–0
Manchester City	1–0	0–2	0–3	0–2	0–0	0–1	2–1	3–1	0–0		0–1	1–0	0–0	0–0	0–2	0–0	1–2	0–0	2–0	0–1
Manchester United	0–1	3–1	4–1	4–1	2–0	1–1	3–0	5–1	2–0	3–1		1–1	2–0	3–0	3–2	2–0	1–0	4–0	0–1	3–1
Middlesbrough	1–1	1–3	0–1	5–1	2–0	2–1	2–1	3–1	0–0	0–2	1–2		1–0	0–4	2–1	3–1	2–3	4–1	1–0	1–1
Newcastle United	0–0	3–1	0–2	1–2	0–0	0–0	1–1	1–2	2–1	0–1	2–2	0–0		1–0	3–2	0–1	3–1	2–1	2–2	2–1
Portsmouth	0–0	2–2	3–0	0–1	0–1	0–2	2–0	1–1	2–1	2–1	2–1	0–0	2–1		3–1	3–1	1–1	2–1	2–0	1–0
Reading	0–4	2–0	1–2	1–0	2–0	0–1	0–2	1–0	1–2	1–0	1–1	3–2	1–0	0–0		3–1	3–1	0–2	6–0	3–2
Sheffield United	1–0	2–2	0–0	2–2	2–1	0–2	1–1	2–0	1–1	0–1	1–2	2–1	1–2	1–1	1–2		2–1	1–0	3–0	1–2
Tottenham Hotspur	2–2	2–1	1–1	4–1	5–1	2–1	0–2	0–0	0–1	2–1	0–4	2–1	2–3	2–1	1–0	2–0		3–1	1–0	3–1
Watford	1–2	0–0	2–1	0–1	2–2	0–1	0–3	3–3	0–3	1–1	1–2	2–0	1–1	4–2	0–0	0–1	0–0		1–1	1–1
West Ham United	1–0	1–1	2–1	3–1	3–1	1–4	1–0	3–3	1–2	0–1	1–0	2–0	0–2	1–2	0–1	1–0	3–4	0–1		0–2
Wigan Athletic	0–1	0–0	0–3	1–3	3–2	2–3	0–2	0–0	0–4	4–0	1–3	0–1	1–0	1–0	1–0	0–1	3–3	1–1	0–3	

Source: Barclays Premier League
Legend: Blue = home team win; Yellow = draw; Red = away team win.

== Season statistics ==
=== Scoring ===
- Biggest win: 6 goals – Reading 6–0 West Ham United (1 January 2007)
- Highest scoring match: 8 goals – Arsenal 6–2 Blackburn Rovers
- First goal: Rob Hulse for Sheffield United against Liverpool (19 August 2006)
- Last goal: Harry Kewell (pen.) for Liverpool against Charlton Athletic (13 May 2007)

=== Overall ===
- Most wins: 28 – Manchester United
- Fewest wins: 5 – Watford
- Most losses: 21 – West Ham United
- Fewest losses: 3 – Chelsea
- Most goals scored: 83 – Manchester United
- Fewest goals scored: 29 – Manchester City and Watford
- Most goals conceded: 60 – Fulham and Charlton Athletic
- Fewest goals conceded: 24 – Chelsea

=== Home ===
- Most wins: 15 – Manchester United
- Fewest wins: 3 – Watford
- Most losses: 10 – Wigan Athletic
- Fewest losses: 0 – Chelsea
- Most goals scored: 46 – Manchester United
- Fewest goals scored: 10 – Manchester City
- Most goals conceded: 30 – Wigan Athletic
- Fewest goals conceded: 7 – Liverpool

=== Away ===
- Most wins: 13 – Manchester United
- Fewest wins: 1 – Fulham and Charlton Athletic
- Most losses: 14 – Sheffield United
- Fewest losses: 3 – Manchester United and Chelsea
- Most goals scored: 37 – Manchester United
- Fewest goals scored: 8 – Sheffield United
- Most goals conceded: 42 – Fulham
- Fewest goals conceded: 13 – Chelsea

=== Top scorers ===
Rank	Player	Club	Goals
1	(Ivory Coast) Didier Drogba	Chelsea	20
2	(South Africa) Benni McCarthy	Blackburn Rovers	18
3	(Portugal) Cristiano Ronaldo	Manchester United	17
4	(England) Wayne Rooney	Manchester United	14
4	(Australia) Mark Viduka	Middlesbrough	14
6	(England) Darren Bent	Charlton Athletic	13
6	(Republic of Ireland) Kevin Doyle	Reading	13
8	(Bulgaria) Dimitar Berbatov	Tottenham Hotspur	12
8	(Netherlands) Dirk Kuyt	Liverpool	12
8	(Nigeria) Yakubu	Middlesbrough	12

=== Historic goals ===
==== 15,000th goal ====
The Premier League expected to have the league's 15,000th goal scored at some point in the period between Christmas and New Year. The target was reached on 30 December when Moritz Volz scored for Fulham against Chelsea. Barclays, the Premiership's sponsor, donated £15,000 to the Fulham Community Sports Trust in Volz' name. Additionally, a fan who correctly predicted that Volz would score the historic goal in a contest presented the player with a special award prior to Fulham's game against Watford at Craven Cottage on 1 January. The honour of scoring the 15,000th goal led to Volz being nicknamed "15,000 Volz".

==== Goalkeeper scores ====
On 17 March 2007, Tottenham Hotspur goalkeeper Paul Robinson scored against Watford from an 83-yard free kick, which bounced over his England teammate Ben Foster, who was in goal for the Hornets, leading Spurs to a 3–1 win at White Hart Lane. This was the third goal scored by a goalkeeper in Premiership history. The other two were scored by Peter Schmeichel, for Aston Villa against Everton on 21 October 2001, and Brad Friedel, for Blackburn Rovers against Charlton Athletic on 21 February 2004. In those two cases, the teams they played for lost. Robinson became the first keeper to score for the winning team in a Premiership match.

== Relegation controversy ==
West Ham escaped relegation on the final day of the season with a 1–0 win over Manchester United, with Carlos Tevez scoring the winner. Sheffield United were relegated, along with Charlton and Watford. Tevez was subsequently found to have been ineligible to play, as he was not owned by West Ham, but by a third party. Sheffield United sued to keep their Premier League status and, when that failed, went to an FA arbitration panel seeking up to £30m compensation. The arbitration panel found in favour of Sheffield United. The two clubs subsequently settled out of court for an undisclosed sum, while West Ham were fined £5.5 million by the Premier League.

== Awards ==
=== Monthly awards ===
Month	Manager of the Month		Player of the Month		Reference
Month	Manager	Club	Player	Club	Reference
August	(Scotland) Sir Alex Ferguson	Manchester United	(Wales) Ryan Giggs	Manchester United	
September	(England) Steve Coppell	Reading	(England) Andrew Johnson	Everton	
October	(Scotland) Sir Alex Ferguson	Manchester United	(England) Paul Scholes	Manchester United	
November	(England) Steve Coppell	Reading	(Portugal) Cristiano Ronaldo	Manchester United	
December	(England) Sam Allardyce	Bolton Wanderers	(Portugal) Cristiano Ronaldo	Manchester United	
January	(Spain) Rafael Benítez	Liverpool	(Spain) Cesc Fàbregas	Arsenal	
February	(Scotland) Sir Alex Ferguson	Manchester United	(Wales) Ryan Giggs	Manchester United	
March	(Portugal) José Mourinho	Chelsea	(Czech Republic) Petr Čech	Chelsea	
April	(Northern Ireland) Martin O'Neill	Aston Villa	(Republic of Ireland) Robbie Keane (Bulgaria) Dimitar Berbatov	Tottenham Hotspur	

=== Annual awards ===
Award	Winner	Club
Premier League Manager of the Season	(Scotland) Sir Alex Ferguson	Manchester United
Premier League Player of the Season	(Portugal) Cristiano Ronaldo	Manchester United
PFA Players' Player of the Year	(Portugal) Cristiano Ronaldo	Manchester United
PFA Young Player of the Year	(Portugal) Cristiano Ronaldo	Manchester United
PFA Fans' Player of the Year	(Portugal) Cristiano Ronaldo	Manchester United
FWA Footballer of the Year	(Portugal) Cristiano Ronaldo	Manchester United

PFA Team of the Year
Goalkeeper	(Netherlands) Edwin van der Sar (Manchester United)			
Defence	(England) Gary Neville (Manchester United)	(England) Rio Ferdinand (Manchester United)	(Serbia) Nemanja Vidić (Manchester United)	(France) Patrice Evra (Manchester United)
Midfield	(Portugal) Cristiano Ronaldo (Manchester United)	(England) Steven Gerrard (Liverpool)	(England) Paul Scholes (Manchester United)	(Wales) Ryan Giggs (Manchester United)
Attack	(Ivory Coast) Didier Drogba (Chelsea)		(Bulgaria) Dimitar Berbatov (Tottenham Hotspur)	

== Attendances ==
#	Football club	Home games	Average attendance
1	Manchester United	19	75,826
2	Arsenal FC	19	60,045
3	Newcastle United	19	50,686
4	Liverpool FC	19	43,561
5	Chelsea FC	19	41,542
6	Manchester City	19	39,997
7	Everton FC	19	36,739
8	Aston Villa	19	36,214
9	Tottenham Hotspur	19	35,739
10	West Ham United	19	34,719
11	Sheffield United	19	30,512
12	Middlesbrough FC	19	27,730
13	Charlton Athletic	19	26,195
14	Reading FC	19	23,829
15	Bolton Wanderers	19	23,606
16	Fulham FC	19	22,279
17	Blackburn Rovers	19	21,275
18	Portsmouth FC	19	19,862
19	Watford FC	19	18,751
20	Wigan Athletic	19	18,159

== See also ==
- 2006–07 in English football
- 2006–07 Football League
