= Borja Docal =

Spanish footballer

Personal information
- Full name: Borja Docal Sáiz
- Date of birth: 3 October 1991 (age 35)
- Place of birth: Santander, Spain
- Height: 1.75 m (5 ft 9 in)
- Positions: Left-back; left winger

Youth career
- Racing Santander

Senior career*
Years	Team	Apps	(Gls)
2010–2012	Racing B	88	(19)
2012–2013	Racing Santander	17	(1)
2013–2015	Mirandés	26	(1)
2015–2016	Racing Santander	14	(0)
2016	Senica	2	(0)
2017	Dynamo Brest	6	(0)
2018	Gimnástica	5	(0)
Total		158	(21)
- * Club domestic league appearances and goals

Borja Docal Sáiz (born 3 October 1991) is a Spanish former professional footballer who played as either a left-back or a left winger.

== Career ==
Docal was born in Santander, Cantabria. A product of local giants Racing de Santander's youth system, he made his first-team debut on 19 August 2012, starting in a 1–0 home loss against Las Palmas in the Segunda División. He scored his first professional goal the following 23 March but in another defeat, this time 3–2 at CD Lugo. He finished his first season with the main squad with 14 starts and 1,314 minutes of action, suffering relegation.

On 14 July 2013, Docal signed with fellow second-tier club Mirandés. He returned to Racing the following year, and subsequently had abroad spells with FK Senica (Slovak Super Liga) and Dynamo Brest (Belarusian Premier League) before returning to Spain in 2018 with Gimnástica de Torrelavega.

== Personal life ==
Docal's second cousin, Sergio Canales – their paternal grandmothers being sisters – was also a footballer.
