= Nathan Ashton =

English footballer (born 1987)

Personal information
- Full name: Nathan Wesley Ashton
- Date of birth: 30 January 1987 (age 39)
- Place of birth: Beckton, England
- Height: 5 ft 9 in (1.75 m)
- Position: Winger

Youth career
- ?–2005: Charlton Athletic

Senior career*
Years	Team	Apps	(Gls)
2005–2007	Charlton Athletic	0	(0)
2007	→ Millwall (loan)	0	(0)
2007–2008	Fulham	1	(0)
2008	→ Crystal Palace (loan)	1	(0)
2008–2009	Wycombe Wanderers	11	(0)
2009	AFC Wimbledon	1	(0)
2010–2011	Cray Wanderers	1	(1)
2011–2011	Dover Athletic	9	(1)
2011	Thurrock	17	(1)
2013	Billericay Town	?	(?)
2013–2014	Tilbury	7	(2)

International career
2002–2003	England U16	8	(0)
2004	England U17	8	(0)
2004	England U18	1	(0)
2005	England U19	3	(0)
- * Club domestic league appearances and goals

Nathan Wesley Ashton (born 30 January 1987) is an English former footballer who played as a winger.

== Career ==
In the early part of the 2004–05 season, Ashton had an ankle injury, but having shaken this off, he made his first appearances for Charlton Athletic's youth team in the 2005–06 season. Having been named on the bench the previous match, he made his first-team debut in the League Cup against Carlisle United on 19 September 2006.

Ashton signed for Fulham in August 2007, making his debut in the 3–1 win against Reading in November 2007. He never played for the club again.

On 27 March 2008, he joined Crystal Palace on loan until the end of the season, though he only featured for 45 minutes for Palace.

He joined Wycombe Wanderers on 25 July on a two-year deal, though he left on 30 May 2009 with his contract being cancelled by mutual consent after Ashton expressed a desire to play football more regularly.

On 29 October 2009, it was announced that he had joined AFC Wimbledon on a short-term contract, with a view to a longer deal. He made his debut for AFC Wimbledon against Chester City on 31 October at the Deva Stadium. However, he left the club in search of first team football just two weeks later.

In December 2010, Ashton joined Isthmian League Premier Division side Cray Wanderers scoring on his debut. His stay there, however, did not last long and he soon joined Conference South side Dover Athletic, where he made his debut in a 2–1 victory against Dorchester Town. His first goal for the club came during a final day 4–1 victory over St Albans City. In December 2011, Ashton moved to fellow Conference South club Thurrock.

In the summer of 2013, he moved to Billericay Town. Later in the year, he joined Isthmian League Division One North club, Tilbury. He was released later that season due to off field issues.

== Personal life ==
In 2016, Ashton was convicted of conspiracy to rob in association with firearms offences. He was subsequently sentenced to 15 years imprisonment.

In July 2024, Ashton was convicted of the rape of two women in separate attacks and sentenced to 16 years imprisonment. He was described by the judge as "manipulative". Ashton was also placed on the sex offenders' register for life.
