= Simon Patterson (footballer) =

English footballer

Personal information
- Full name: Simon George Patterson
- Date of birth: 4 September 1982
- Place of birth: Harrow, London, England
- Date of death: 9 September 2006 (aged 24)
- Place of death: Shepherd's Bush, London, England
- Position: Striker

Senior career*
Years	Team	Apps	(Gls)
2001–2004	Watford	0	(0)
2002	→ Slough Town (loan)	2	(0)
2003	→ Wycombe Wanderers (loan)	4	(2)
2004–2005	Maidenhead United	12	(2)
2005	Hemel Hempstead Town	3	(0)
2005–2006	Wingate & Finchley	30	(11)
- * Club domestic league appearances and goals

Simon George Patterson (4 September 1982 – 9 September 2006) was an English footballer. He was born in Harrow, London, and signed for Watford on leaving Nower Hill High School in 1999.

Patterson was a striker who scored nine goals in his first eight games for Watford's youth team in their FA Premier Academy League campaign. He received a professional contract in March 2001, six months after his 18th birthday.

On 15 October 2002, Patterson was loaned to non-league Slough Town for a period of one month before returning to Vicarage Road. Later that season he had a loan spell with Wycombe Wanderers, scoring twice in four Division Two fixtures. He remained at Watford until being given a free transfer on 12 May 2004. By this stage he was almost 22 years old but had never played a competitive game for the Hornets.

He later played for Maidenhead before joining Wingate & Finchley. It was while on the payroll of this club that he died in a car crash on 9 September 2006, less than a week after his 24th birthday. Patterson had been driving along the A40 in Shepherd's Bush when he lost control of his BMW 328i and the vehicle smashed into roadside barriers. He died instantly from multiple injuries. His two passengers were badly injured but survived.
