= Les Reed (football manager) =

English association football player and manager (born 1952)

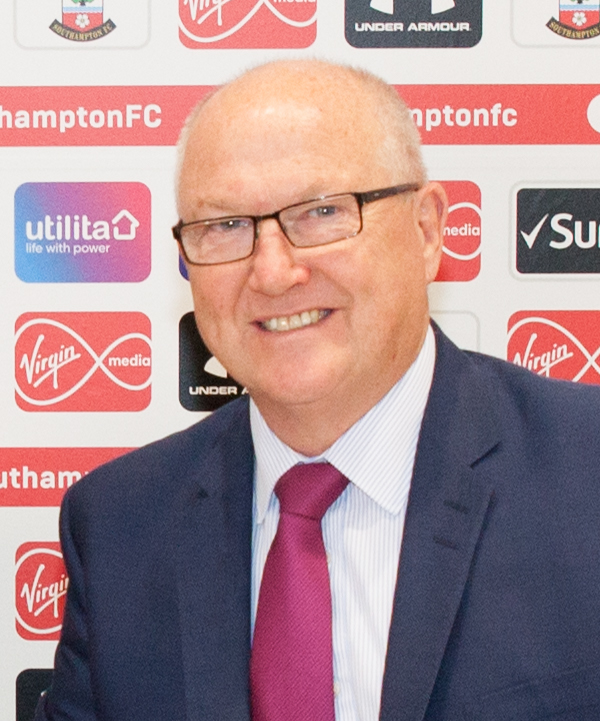
- Reed in 2017

Personal information
- Date of birth: 12 December 1952 (age 73)
- Place of birth: Wapping, England

Senior career*
Years	Team	Apps	(Gls)
	Cambridge United	0	(0)
	Watford	0	(0)
	Wycombe Wanderers	0	(0)

Managerial career
- 2006: Charlton Athletic
- * Club domestic league appearances and goals

Leslie Arnold Reed (born 12 December 1952) is an English football coach and former player who was the manager of Charlton Athletic between 14 November and 24 December 2006. He was technical director of the Football Association between 2002 and 2004. Between April 2010 and November 2018, Reed was Head of Football Development and the Vice-Chairman of Football at Southampton.

Reed was appointed as football strategy advisor at Wrexham on 1 June 2021.

== Early life and playing career ==
Reed was born in Wapping, London. He was on the books as a football player for Cambridge United, Watford, and Wycombe Wanderers as a centre forward, but did not play any league matches for any of the three clubs.

== Coaching and managerial career ==
=== Early career ===
Reed started his coaching career in non-league football, coaching both Finchley and Wealdstone. In 1985 Wealdstone won both the Football Conference and the FA Trophy with him.

In 1986, he joined the Football Association (FA) as development officer. He worked there for nine years in a variety of roles including Regional Director of Coaching and coach at The FA National School, where he worked with Joe Cole, Sol Campbell, Nick Barmby and Michael Owen, among others. He went to Italy for his first World Cup in 1990 with Bobby Robson's England team. It was the first of three World Cup finals tournaments in which he would serve his country.

In 1995 Reed left the FA to become Alan Curbishley's assistant at Charlton Athletic, helping them to gain promotion to the FA Premier League via the playoffs in 1998. After the final Reed was appointed Director of Technical Development at the FA by Howard Wilkinson, its Technical Director at the time. He coached England's new under-15 National Team to win the Nationwide Trophy at Wembley, defeating an Argentine team that included Carlos Tevez.

=== The FA and England ===
In 1998 Reed rejoined the FA as part of the England national coaching setup under Kevin Keegan. During Euro 2000, Keegan allowed Reed to respond to virtually all the tactical questions posed by the English press after England's defeat by Portugal. Many journalists wondered in their columns how a manager and his coaching team had allowed a minor member of their entourage such an important role.

In his autobiography, Gerrard: My Autobiography, Liverpool captain Steven Gerrard said that he had "no respect" for Les Reed after the way he treated him during England's Euro 2000 campaign. Gerrard wrote, "To this day, I have no respect for Reed or (fellow coach) Derek Fazackerley. I was a young lad who had never been away from home to play football before. They didn't seem to understand that not everyone can board a plane, settle in a strange hotel far from the family they love, and find it easy. In fact they made me feel like shit. My homesickness worsened whenever I was forced to be in their company. I felt they could have shown more care and sympathy. They were always pushing me, always telling me to buck up my ideas."

In 2002 Reed replaced Howard Wilkinson as the FA's Technical Director. During Reed's second spell at the FA he authored the FA's official coaching manual, The Official FA Guide to Basic Team Coaching, but he left the FA in 2004.

=== Charlton Athletic ===
Reed worked for a time as a consultant. Among his clients was the Northern Ireland national football team, who would defeat England during his stint with the side. He returned to Charlton to become Iain Dowie's assistant manager in summer 2006. Dowie was dismissed on 13 November 2006 and Reed was promoted to replace him. During his six-week spell as manager Reed managed just one victory, and Charlton were knocked out of the League Cup by League Two team Wycombe Wanderers. He was replaced as manager by Alan Pardew on 24 December, leaving Charlton Athletic by mutual consent.

=== Fulham ===
Reed was linked with a consultancy role helping Northern Ireland boss Lawrie Sanchez, who approached him after a League Managers' Association meeting at West Bromwich Albion in February 2007. He had been considering consultancy roles with the football associations of Turkey and Latvia, and he revealed that he could return to Charlton in an overseas development role. After a period advising the Football Association of Ireland, he became first-team coach at Fulham in April 2007, where he helped the club retain their league position at the expense of Charlton. In June 2007 he was appointed Director of Football at Fulham, recruiting Chris Smalling from non-league football, later to be sold for an estimated £12 million to Manchester United.

=== Bishop's Stortford ===
On 19 December 2008 Reed was appointed assistant manager on a voluntary basis at Bishop's Stortford in the Conference South, to help manager Mark Simpson.

=== Maccabiah Games ===
Reed, who had been to Israel several times, was Team GB head coach at the 2009 Maccabiah Games in Israel, with Jonathan Kestenbaum, Baron Kestenbaum as his Team GB manager. The team won the silver medal, losing in the finals to Argentina. Reed said: "The 18th Maccabiah Games were one of the highlights of my career as a coach."

=== Southampton ===
On 16 April 2010 Reed was appointed Head of Football Development and Support at Southampton, and later the Vice-Chairman, overseeing four main areas: the Youth Academy, Scouting and Recruitment, Sports medicine and Science, and Kit and Equipment Management. Reed left the club on 8 November 2018.

== Football Association ==
On 21 December 2018, It was announced that Reed was appointed as the Football Association's technical director, and would take up the post in February 2019.

== Managerial stats ==
Team	Nat	From	To	Record				
Team	Nat	From	To	G	W	D	L	Win %
Charlton Athletic	(England)	14 November 2006	24 December 2006	8	1	1	6	12.5
