= List of Fulham F.C. players (1–24 appearances) =

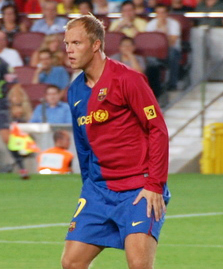
Eiður Guðjohnsen (pictured playing for Barcelona in 2008) played ten matches in a Fulham shirt in his one-season spell with the club in 2011. As of August 2019, Guðjohnsen sits joint fourth on his country's record appearance list and is Iceland's all-time top scorer with 26 goals in 88 games.

Fulham Football Club is an English professional football team based in Fulham in the London Borough of Hammersmith and Fulham. The club was formed in West Kensington in 1879 as Fulham St Andrew's Church Sunday School F.C., shortened to Fulham F.C. in 1888. They initially played at Fulham Fields before a move to Craven Cottage in 1896; the club played their first professional match in December 1898 and made their FA Cup debut in the 1902–03 season. The club competed in the Southern Football League between 1898 and 1907, when they were accepted into the Football League Second Division. Having spent much of their history outside the top division, the team gained promotion to the Premier League in 2001. They spent more than ten seasons in the top flight, and reached the final of the UEFA Europa League in 2010. In 2014 they were relegated to the Championship. They have since spent one further season back in the Premier League in 2018–19 but suffered an immediate return to the Championship.

Since the club's first competitive match, 966 players have made an appearance in a competitive match, of which 500 have played only a handful of matches (including substitute appearances); all players who have made fewer than 25 appearances for the club are listed below. Harry Arter, Ivan Cavaleiro, Ibrahima Cissé, Luca de la Torre, Marcelo Djaló, Tayo Edun, Fabri, Tyrese Francois, Anthony Knockaert, Alfie Mawson, Josh Onomah, Matt O'Riley, Harrison Reed, Bobby Decordova-Reid, Steven Sessegnon and Martell Taylor-Crossdale are the current squad members who have played less than 25 matches for Fulham.

Arter, Cavaleiro, Francois, Knockaert, Onomah, Reed, Decordova-Reid and Taylor-Crossdale have all made their Fulham debut during the 2019–20 season, with Francois, Onomah and Taylor-Crossdale all making their first appearance most recently in Fulham's League Cup tie against Southampton F.C. on 27 August 2019.

== Players ==
This list contains the 500 players, including sixteen current squad members, as of 30 August 2019, who have made fewer than 25 appearances for Fulham, ordered by the year in which they played for the club and then alphabetically by surname. The figure for league appearances and goals comprise those in the Southern Football League, the Football League and the Premier League. Total appearances and goals comprise those in the Southern Football League, Football League (including test matches and play-offs), Premier League, FA Cup, Football League Cup, Football League Trophy, UEFA Intertoto Cup and UEFA Cup/Europa League. Wartime matches are regarded as unofficial and are excluded, as are matches from the abandoned 1939–40 season. Statistics for the Watney Cup and Anglo-Scottish Cup are not included in the table. International appearances and goals are given for the senior national team only.

Figures are mostly taken from Fulham: The Complete Record by Dennis Turner (published in 2007). UEFA Intertoto Cup and UEFA Cup/Europa League appearance statistics for 2002–03, 2009–10 and 2011–12 is taken from Soccerbase, along with all other statistics from the 2007–08 season onwards.

Statistics are correct as of 30 August 2019. International statistics are correct as of 19 July 2019.

Positions key
Pre-1960s		Post-1960s	
GK	Goalkeeper		
FB	Full back	DF	Defender
HB	Half back	MF	Midfielder
FW	Forward		

Symbol	Meaning
‡	Fulham player in the 2019–20 season.
*	Player has left Fulham but is still playing professional football.
^	Player is currently playing international football.
♦	Player went on to manage the club.
(c)	Player captained the side.
Fulham career	The year of the player's first appearance for Fulham to the year of his last appearance
Apps	Number of appearances for Fulham, both starting and as a substitute
Int. apps	Appearances for his country's senior international team
Int. country	Flag only shown when a player has represented his country
Int. goals	Goals scored for his country's senior international team

Name	Position	Fulham career	League apps	League goals	Total apps	Total goals	Int. country (Note: Where a player did not compete internationally, no country is denoted. Between 1926 and 1950, two competing teams claimed to represent the island of Ireland. Where an Irish player from this period played for both teams, no flag is given. denotes players who played for the Irish Football Association team. denotes players who played for the Football Association of Ireland team. For more information, see Ireland national football team (1882–1950) and Republic of Ireland national football team.)	Int. apps	Int. goals	Notes	Refs
William Angus	MF	1899–1900	1	0	1	0	None	0	0	—	
David Lloyd	HB	1899–1904	0	0	3	2	None	0	0	—	
Fred Spackman	HB	1899–1904	0	0	2	0	None	0	0	—	
George Tuthill	FB	1899–1905	0	0	3	0	None	0	0	—	
Tommy Meade	FW	1900–1905	7	1	9	5	None	0	0	—	
Robert Tannahill	HB	1901–1904	0	0	4	2	None	0	0	—	
Tom Pratt	FW	1902–1903	4	0	4	0	None	0	0	—	
Billy Porter	HB	1902–1904	1	0	1	0	None	0	0	—	
Edward Anderson	HB	1903–1904	6	0	6	0	None	0	0	—	
Charlie Axcell	FW	1903–1905	17	4	18	4	None	0	0	—	
Billy Biggar	GK	1903–1904	7	0	10	0	None	0	0	—	
George Colville	HB	1903–1904	6	0	6	0	None	0	0	—	
Alex Davidson	FW	1903–1904	1	0	2	0	None	0	0	—	
Jock Hamilton	FB	1903–1904	12	0	13	0	None	0	0	—	
Gilbert Farnfield	HB	1903–1904	1	0	1	0	None	0	0	—	
Herbert Farnfield	HB	1903–1904	1	0	1	0	None	0	0	—	
Percy Farnfield	FB	1903–1904	1	0	1	0	None	0	0	—	
Albert Fisher	HB	1903–1904	1	0	5	2	None	0	0	—	
Ellis Green	FB	1903–1904	9	0	13	1	None	0	0	—	
Cornelius Hogan	HB	1903–1904	2	1	2	1	None	0	0	—	
Hugh McQueen	HB	1903–1904	10	0	14	1	None	0	0	—	
Hugh May	HB	1903–1904	8	2	10	2	None	0	0	—	
Walter Miecznikowski	HB	1903–1904	2	0	2	0	None	0	0	—	
George Nidd	HB	1903–1904	0	0	3	0	None	0	0	—	
Roy Stephenson	FB	1903–1904	1	0	1	0	None	0	0	—	
George Storey	FW	1903–1904	3	0	3	0	None	0	0	—	
Fergus Hunt	HB	1903–1905	21	3	23	3	None	0	0	—	
Alf Harwood	FW	1903–1906	14	2	18	2	None	0	0	—	
Fred Waterson	FB	1903–1909	8	0	14	0	None	0	0	—	
Joe Connor	FW	1904–1905	11	1	11	1	Ireland	3	1	—	
Will Bradshaw	HB	1904–1905	5	2	5	2	None	0	0	—	
Henry Clutterbuck	GK	1904–1905	3	0	3	0	None	0	0	—	
Tom Phillipson	HB	1904–1905	1	0	1	0	None	0	0	—	
Tom Holmes	HB	1904–1907	1	1	1	1	None	0	0	—	
Joe Bradshaw ♦	HB	1904–1908	7	0	7	0	None	0	0	(Note: Joe Bradshaw became Fulham manager in 1926 and remained in his post for three years. His father Harry had managed the team from 1904 to 1909 when Joe was playing for them, along with his other son Will.)	
Frank Edgeley	FW	1905–1906	15	6	15	6	None	0	0	—	
Jack Fitchett	FB	1905–1906	2	0	3	0	None	0	0	—	
Conyers Kirby	HB	1905–1906	4	0	4	0	None	0	0	—	
Louis Thomas	HB	1905–1906	1	0	1	0	None	0	0	—	
Fred Thompson	GK	1905–1906	4	0	5	0	None	0	0	—	
Willie Wood	HB	1905–1906	9	2	11	2	None	0	0	—	
Jimmy Hogan ♦	HB	1905–1908	18	5	19	5	None	0	0	(Note: Jimmy Hogan took charge of Fulham for the duration of the 1934–35season, guiding the club to seventh place in the Second Division.)	
Samson Archer	GK	1905–1910	1	0	1	0	None	0	0	—	
James Hindmarsh	HB	1906–1907	1	0	1	0	None	0	0	—	
William Horne	GK	1906–1907	3	0	3	0	None	0	0	—	
Edward McIntyre	FB	1906–1907	5	0	5	0	None	0	0	—	
Benny Thompson	HB	1906–1907	8	2	8	2	None	0	0	—	
Fred Bevan	FW	1907–1908	5	1	5	1	None	0	0	—	
Billy Hind	FB	1907–1908	3	0	3	0	None	0	0	—	
Archie Hubbard	HB	1907–1908	5	1	5	1	None	0	0	—	
Felix Ward	HB	1907–1908	4	0	4	0	None	0	0	—	
Herbert Crossthwaite	GK	1907–1909	2	0	2	0	None	0	0	—	
John McCourt	FW	1907–1909	2	0	2	0	None	0	0	—	
Albert Wilkes	FB	1907–1909	16	1	16	1	None	0	0	—	
Tommy Leigh	FB	1907–1910	1	0	1	0	None	0	0	—	
Dick Prout	HB	1907–1910	7	0	8	0	None	0	0	—	
Bob Carter	FW	1908–1909	10	7	10	7	None	0	0	—	
George Parsonage	FB	1908–1909	22	3	23	3	None	0	0	—	
David Wyllie	FW	1908–1909	7	0	7	0	None	0	0	—	
Ben Millington	FW	1908–1910	1	0	1	0	None	0	0	—	
Arthur Berry	HB	1909–1910	12	0	12	0	England	0	0	(Note: Berry played 24 matches for England's amateur team.)	
Will Dixon	HB	1909–1910	1	0	1	0	None	0	0	—	
Jack Flanagan	FW	1909–1910	11	1	12	1	None	0	0	—	
Henry Littlewort	FB	1909–1910	4	0	4	0	None	0	0	—	
Pat McLaughlin	FW	1909–1910	2	1	2	1	None	0	0	—	
George Malcolm	FW	1909–1910	4	1	4	1	None	0	0	—	
Peter O'Donnell	GK	1909–1910	3	0	3	0	None	0	0	—	
George Horton	FW	1910–1911	1	0	1	0	None	0	0	—	
Joe Kirkwood	FB	1910–1911	1	0	2	0	None	0	0	—	
George Redwood	FB	1910–1911	7	0	7	0	None	0	0	—	
Robert Burns	FB	1910–1911	18	7	18	7	None	0	0	—	
Billy Borland	FB	1910–1912	3	0	3	0	None	0	0	—	
Thomas Spink	HB	1910–1912	11	1	11	1	None	0	0	—	
Robert Clifford	FB	1911–1912	8	0	8	0	None	0	0	—	
David Duncan	HB	1911–1912	8	0	8	0	None	0	0	—	
Hassan Hegazi	HB	1911–1912	1	1	1	1	None	0	0	—	
William McIntosh	HB	1911–1912	6	0	7	0	None	0	0	—	
Arthur Wood	FW	1911–1919	21	1	21	1	None	0	0	—	
Ernie Bowering	FB	1912–1913	1	0	1	0	None	0	0	—	
Sam Forrest	FB	1912–1915	8	0	8	0	None	0	0	—	
Fred Crossley	HB	1912–1913	1	0	1	0	None	0	0	—	
Thomas Fitchie	FW	1912–1913	8	2	8	2	None	0	0	—	
Alex Overend	FW	1912–1913	3	0	3	0	None	0	0	—	
Jock Weir	FW	1912–1913	1	0	1	0	None	0	0	—	
Thomas Whinship	HB	1912–1913	2	0	2	0	None	0	0	—	
Percy Champion	HB	1912–1914	2	0	2	0	None	0	0	—	
Tommy Stewart	DF	1912–1914	15	0	15	0	None	0	0	—	
Jock Curtis	HB	1913–1914	2	0	2	0	None	0	0	—	
Bill Garvey	FB	1913–1914	2	0	2	0	None	0	0	—	
Tommy Laws	FB	1913–1914	6	0	6	0	None	0	0	—	
Hugh McDonald	GK	1913–1914	8	0	8	0	None	0	0	—	
James Nichol	HB	1913–1915	3	0	3	0	None	0	0	—	
George Cannon	FW	1914–1915	6	0	6	0	None	0	0	—	
William Maughan	FB	1914–1915	22	1	24	1	None	0	0	—	
Charles Miller	HB	1914–1915	6	0	6	0	None	0	0	—	
Henry Simons	FW	1914–1915	9	0	9	0	None	0	0	—	
Donald Slade	FW	1914–1915	17	5	17	5	None	0	0	—	
Edward Thompson	FB	1914–1915	1	0	1	0	None	0	0	—	
James Bellamy	HB	1914–1919	17	1	17	1	None	0	0	—	
William Hall	FB	1917–1920	1	0	1	0	None	0	0	—	
Ernie Symes	HB	1917–1923	6	0	6	0	None	0	0	—	
Walter Coates	HB	1919–1920	2	0	2	0	None	0	0	—	
Gordon Hoare	HB	1919–1920	2	0	3	1	England	0	0	(Note: Hoare represented England's amateur team at the 1912 Summer Olympics, winning a gold medal.)	
John Houghton	FB	1919–1920	2	0	2	0	None	0	0	—	
Bert Nash	HB	1919–1920	3	0	3	0	None	0	0	—	
George Bertram	HB	1919–1921	15	2	15	2	None	0	0	—	
Harry Morris	FW	1919–1921	6	2	7	2	None	0	0	—	
Jack Hall	HB	1920–1921	9	3	11	3	None	0	0	—	
Sid Marrable	DF	1920–1921	8	0	8	0	None	0	0	—	
Charles Boland	HB	1921–1923	2	0	2	0	None	0	0	—	
Harry Walker	FB	1921–1923	8	0	8	0	None	0	0	—	
Len Thomas	HB	1922–1923	1	0	1	0	None	0	0	—	
Len Wood	HB	1921–1923	4	2	4	2	None	0	0	—	
James Smith	FW	1922–1923	5	1	5	1	None	0	0	—	
James McKay	FW	1922–1924	17	5	17	5	None	0	0	—	
George Reid	FW	1923–1924	2	0	3	0	Ireland	1	0	—	
Les Heard	HB	1923–1925	19	3	19	3	None	0	0	—	
Hugh Lafferty	FB	1923–1925	4	0	4	0	None	0	0	—	
George London	FB	1923–1925	7	0	7	0	None	0	0	—	
Fred Whalley	GK	1924–1925	8	0	9	0	None	0	0	—	
George Aimer	FB	1923–1926	16	0	17	0	None	0	0	—	
Fred Packham	HB	1923–1926	5	0	5	0	None	0	0	—	
Dick Richards	HB	1924–1925	21	2	23	3	Wales	9	1	—	
John Brooks	FB	1924–1926	9	0	9	0	None	0	0	—	
Sam Kennedy	FB	1924–1926	6	1	6	1	None	0	0	—	
Fred Pilkington	FB	1924–1927	4	1	4	1	None	0	0	—	
Robert Ferguson	FW	1924–1928	22	5	24	5	None	0	0	—	
Len Boot	GK	1925–1926	9	0	9	0	None	0	0	—	
Bill Caesar	FB	1925–1926	1	0	1	0	None	0	0	—	
Tom Garnish	HB	1925–1926	3	0	3	0	None	0	0	—	
Jimmy McCree	HB	1925–1926	2	0	2	0	None	0	0	—	
Tom McKenna	GK	1925–1926	10	0	10	0	None	0	0	—	
Bert White	FW	1925–1926	7	1	8	2	None	0	0	—	
Tot Pike	HB	1925–1927	3	0	3	0	None	0	0	—	
Billy Probert	FB	1925–1927	16	0	17	0	None	0	0	—	
Tommy Brown	FB	1926–1927	11	0	13	0	None	0	0	—	
James Scullion	FW	1926–1927	1	0	1	0	None	0	0	—	
George Harris	FB	1926–1928	8	0	8	0	None	0	0	—	
Charlie Walters	FB	1926–1928	17	0	19	0	None	0	0	—	
Reg Johnson	FB	1926–1929	4	1	4	1	None	0	0	—	
Alan Moseley	HB	1926–1930	2	0	2	0	None	0	0	—	
Charlie Devan	HB	1927–1928	7	2	7	2	None	0	0	—	
George Horler	FB	1927–1928	8	0	9	0	None	0	0	—	
Walter Hoyland	HB	1927–1928	22	4	23	4	None	0	0	—	
Jack Hebden	FB	1927–1929	23	0	24	0	None	0	0	—	
Cecil Spark	HB	1927–1929	2	0	2	0	None	0	0	—	
Harry Lowe	FB	1927–1930	3	0	3	0	None	0	0	—	
Len Brooks	GK	1927–1932	2	0	2	0	None	0	0	—	
Arthur Meeson	GK	1928–1929	1	0	1	0	None	0	0	—	
Ralph Allen	HB	1928–1931	16	8	16	8	None	0	0	—	
Bill Dowden	FW	1928–1931	1	1	1	1	None	0	0	—	
Joe Proud	HB	1928–1932	12	3	12	3	None	0	0	—	
Sam Henderson	HB	1929–1930	18	0	23	0	None	0	0	—	
Willie Brown	HB	1929–1930	2	0	2	0	None	0	0	—	
Robert Bradley	FB	1929–1930	6	0	6	0	None	0	0	—	
Albert Keeble	FW	1929–1930	1	0	1	0	None	0	0	—	
Ted Regan	FB	1929–1930	1	0	1	0	None	0	0	—	
Dicky Boland	HB	1929–1931	6	0	6	0	None	0	0	—	
Tommy Cox	HB	1929–1931	5	1	5	1	None	0	0	—	
Jerry Murphy	FW	1929–1931	13	2	13	2	None	0	0	—	
John Dudley	DF	1929–1932	14	0	16	0	None	0	0	—	
James Baillie	FB	1930–1931	2	0	2	0	None	0	0	—	
Lew Griffiths	FW	1930–1931	2	0	2	0	None	0	0	—	
Tom Lilley	FB	1930–1931	7	0	8	0	None	0	0	—	
Joe Reid	FB	1930–1931	7	0	7	0	None	0	0	—	
Jimmy Thompson	FW	1930–1931	4	2	5	2	None	0	0	—	
Ernie Watins	FW	1930–1931	17	10	20	12	None	0	0	—	
Walter Keen	FB	1930–1932	0	0	1	0	None	0	0	—	
Tim Kelly	HB	1930–1932	1	0	1	0	None	0	0	—	
Harry Webb	FB	1930–1933	6	1	6	1	None	0	0	—	
Bill Hickie	FB	1931–1932	9	0	9	0	None	0	0	—	
Peter Molloy	DF	1931–1933	4	0	4	0	None	0	0	—	
Bernard Joy	FB	1931–1935	1	0	1	0	None	0	0	—	
Albert Wood	HB	1931–1935	21	9	23	9	None	0	0	—	
Arthur Haddleton	FW	1932–1933	4	4	4	4	None	0	0	—	
Frank Peters	HB	1932–1933	1	1	1	1	None	0	0	—	
Frank Wrightson	FW	1932–1933	17	5	18	5	None	0	0	—	
Sam Abel	FW	1933–1934	9	1	9	1	None	0	0	—	
Bert Diaper	HB	1933–1935	3	0	3	0	None	0	0	—	
Allan Murray	FB	1933–1935	1	0	1	0	None	0	0	—	
George Ronce	FW	1933–1935	12	1	12	1	None	0	0	—	
Ambrose Buckley	FB	1933–1939	6	0	6	0	None	0	0	—	
Howard Fabian	HB	1934–1935	3	0	3	0	None	0	0	—	
Jock Dodds	FW	1934–1936	1	0	1	0	None	0	0	—	
Albert Allen	HB	1934–1937	11	0	11	0	None	0	0	—	
Harold Pitts	FB	1934–1939	9	0	9	0	None	0	0	—	
Bert Johnston	HB	1935–1936	4	1	4	1	None	0	0	—	
Maurice Edelston	HB	1935–1937	3	0	3	0	None	0	0	—	
Ken Mayes	HB	1935–1937	2	0	2	0	None	0	0	—	
Alf Targett	FB	1935–1937	1	0	1	0	None	0	0	—	
George Cox	FW	1936–1937	5	3	6	3	None	0	0	—	
Harry Cranfield	HB	1937–1947	1	0	1	0	None	0	0	—	
Albert Hudson	HB	1937–1947	1	0	1	0	None	0	0	—	
John Miller	HB	1937–1949	4	0	4	0	None	0	0	—	
James Easson	HB	1938–1939	3	0	3	0	None	0	0	—	
Ernie Tuckett	FB	1938–1939	3	0	3	0	None	0	0	—	
Sam Malpass	FB	1939–1947	2	0	2	0	None	0	0	—	
Dennis Rampling	HB	1942–1948	2	0	4	1	None	0	0	—	
Harry Rickett	GK	1944–1946	0	0	2	0	None	0	0	—	
Jimmy McCormick	HB	1945–1947	9	2	10	2	None	0	0	—	
Cliff Lloyd	FB	1945–1949	2	0	4	0	None	0	0	—	
Dave Bewley	FB	1945–1953	17	1	18	1	None	0	0	—	
Ossie Evans	GK	1946–1947	1	0	1	0	None	0	0	—	
Peter Buchanan	HB	1946–1947	20	1	21	1	Scotland	1	1	—	
Dave Nelson	FW	1946–1947	23	3	24	3	None	0	0	—	
Tommy Edwards	HB	1946–1948	2	0	3	0	None	0	0	—	
Cyril Grant	FW	1946–1948	14	4	15	4	None	0	0	—	
Mark Radcliffe	GK	1946–1948	11	0	13	0	None	0	0	—	
Jimmy Hughes	FB	1946–1949	1	0	1	0	None	0	0	—	
Wally Hinshelwood	HB	1946–1952	19	1	19	1	None	0	0	—	
John Jones	HB	1947–1950	1	0	2	0	None	0	0	—	
Johnny Summers	HB	1947–1950	4	0	4	0	None	0	0	—	
Larry Gage	GK	1948–1950	3	0	3	0	None	0	0	—	
Jimmy Jinks	FW	1948–1950	11	0	11	0	None	0	0	—	
Bernard Newcombe	HB	1948–1956	23	3	23	3	None	0	0	—	
Tommy Cronin	HB	1950–1956	2	0	2	0	None	0	0	—	
Joe Hall	HB	1951–1956	1	0	1	0	None	0	0	—	
Henry Gibson	FB	1952–1955	1	0	1	0	None	0	0	—	
Bill Healey	HB	1952–1955	1	0	1	0	None	0	0	—	
Brian Ronson	GK	1953–1956	2	0	2	0	None	0	0	—	
George Fisher	FB	1954–1955	8	0	8	0	None	0	0	—	
Trevor Watson	HB/MF	1956–1964	17	1	17	1	None	0	0	—	
Alex Forbes	FB	1957–1958	4	0	4	0	None	0	0	—	
Harry Taylor	DF	1957–1958	4	0	4	0	None	0	0	—	
Jock Weir	HB	1957–1958	1	0	1	0	None	0	0	—	
Jimmy Weir	HB/MF	1957–1960	3	0	3	0	None	0	0	—	
Allan Jones	FW	1958–1961	7	3	7	3	None	0	0	—	
Alf Stokes	HB	1959–1960	15	6	15	6	None	0	0	—	
Brian Sullivan	FW	1959–1962	2	1	2	1	None	0	0	—	
Reg Stratton	HB/MF	1959–1965	21	1	24	3	None	0	0	—	
Bobby Brown	FW	1960–1961	8	4	8	4	England	0	0	(Note: Represented Great Britain at the 1960 Summer Olympics, scoring 4 goals in 3 matches.)	
Bobby Drake	DF	1961–1968	15	0	15	0	None	0	0		
Michael Brown	MF	1962–1963	4	0	5	1	None	0	0	—	
Mike Jones	DF	1963–1964	0	0	1	0	None	0	0	—	
Martin Townsend	GK	1963–1964	2	0	3	0	None	0	0	—	
Dave Underwood	GK	1963–1965	18	0	19	0	None	0	0	—	
Terry Parmenter	MF	1964–1969	18	1	21	2	None	0	0	—	
Hugh Cunningham	DF	1966–1968	1	0	1	0	None	0	0	—	
Thurlough O'Connor	FW	1966–1968	1	0	1	0	None	0	0	—	
Bobby Moss	FW	1966–1969	9	3	10	3	None	0	0	—	
Barry Salvage	MF	1967–1969	7	0	7	0	None	0	0	—	
Johnny Byrne	FW	1968–1969	19	2	19	2	England	11	8	—	
Brian Dear	FW	1968–1969	13	7	13	7	None	0	0	—	
Don Kerrigan	FW	1968–1969	6	1	7	1	None	0	0	—	
Malcolm Macdonald	FW	1968–1969	13	5	13	5	None	0	0	—	
Brendan Mullan	FW	1968–1969	4	0	5	2	None	0	0	—	
Ivan Murray	DF	1968–1969	5	0	5	0	None	0	0	—	
Brian Williamson	GK	1968–1969	12	0	14	0	None	0	0	—	
Danny O'Leary	FW	1969–1970	1	0	1	0	None	0	0	—	
Roger Davidson	MF	1970–1971	1	0	2	0	None	0	0	—	
Allan Mansley	MF	1970–1971	1	0	1	0	None	0	0	—	
Alan Morton	FW	1970–1971	1	1	4	1	None	0	0	—	
Dave Carlton	MF	1970–1973	9	0	11	0	None	0	0	—	
Alan Stephenson	DF	1971–1972	10	0	10	0	None	0	0	—	
Alan Pinkney	MF	1972–1973	12	0	12	0	None	0	0	—	
Paul Shrubb	DF	1972–1975	1	0	1	0	None	0	0	—	
Barry Friend	FW	1973–1976	3	0	3	0	None	0	0	—	
Rod Belfitt	FW	1974–1975	6	1	6	1	None	0	0	—	
Tyrone James	DF	1974–1978	20	0	21	0	None	0	0	—	
Steve Camp	FW	1975–1977	1	0	2	1	None	0	0	—	
Micky Kerslake	DF	1975–1978	3	0	3	0	None	0	0	—	
Steve Scrivens	MF	1975–1980	4	1	4	1	None	0	0	—	
Stewart Jump	DF	1976–1977	3	0	3	0	None	0	0	—	
Richard Teale	GK	1976–1977	5	0	5	0	None	0	0	—	
Peter Storey	DF	1976–1978	17	0	19	0	None	0	0	—	
Alan Warboys	FW	1976–1978	19	2	21	2	None	0	0	—	
Colin McCurdy	FW	1977–1978	1	0	1	0	None	0	0	—	
Perry Digweed	GK	1977–1981	15	0	15	0	None	0	0	—	
Gordon Boyd	MF	1978–1979	3	0	4	0	Scotland	0	0	(Note: Represented Scotland at under-18 level.)	
Mark Lovell	MF	1978–1980	6	0	6	0	None	0	0	—	
Tommy Mason	DF	1978–1981	6	0	7	0	None	0	0	—	
Howard Gayle	MF	1979–1980	14	0	14	0	None	0	0	—	
Brian Corner	MF	1979–1981	3	0	3	0	None	0	0	—	
Clive Day	MF	1978–1983	10	0	11	0	None	0	0	—	
Peter Kitchen	FW	1979–1980	24	6	24	6	None	0	0	—	
Dave Clement	DF	1980–1981	18	0	20	0	None	0	0	—	
John Reeves	MF	1981–1985	14	0	17	0	None	0	0	—	
Steve Tapley	DF	1981–1985	2	1	2	1	None	0	0	—	
Brian McDermott	MF	1982–1983	3	0	3	0	None	0	0	—	
Andy Thomas	FW	1982–1983	4	2	4	2	None	0	0	—	
Steve Foley	MF	1983–1984	3	0	3	0	None	0	0	—	
Iain Hesford	GK	1984–1985	3	0	3	0	England	0	0	(Note: Represented England at under-21 level.)	
Trevor Lee	FW	1984–1985	1	0	1	0	None	0	0	—	
Rod Brathwaite	FW	1984–1988	12	2	13	2	None	0	0	—	
Laurence Batty	GK	1984–1991	9	0	12	0	None	0	0	—	
Glenn Burvill	MF	1985–1986	9	2	9	2	None	0	0	—	
John Dreyer	MF	1985–1986	12	2	12	2	None	0	0	—	
Paul Fishenden	FW	1985–1986	3	0	3	0	None	0	0	—	
Mark Grew	GK	1985–1986	4	0	4	0	None	0	0	—	
Gary Smith	MF	1985–1986	1	0	1	0	None	0	0	—	
Kevin Steggles	DF	1986–1987	3	0	3	0	None	0	0	—	
Peter Cawley	DF	1988–1989	5	0	5	0	None	0	0	—	
Colin Gordon	FW	1988–1989	17	2	18	2	None	0	0	—	
Doug Rougvie	DF	1988–1989	20	1	20	1	Scotland	1	0	—	
Steve Greaves	DF	1988–1990	1	0	1	0	None	0	0	—	
Des Bremner	MF	1989–1990	16	0	18	0	Scotland	1	0	—	
Hugh Burns	DF	1989–1990	6	0	6	0	None	0	0	—	
Iain Dowie	FW	1989–1990	5	1	5	1	None	0	0	—	
Alan Dowson	DF	1989–1990	4	0	4	0	None	0	0	—	
Garry Kimble	DF	1989–1990	3	0	5	0	None	0	0	—	
Des Vertannes	DF	1989–1990	2	0	2	0	None	0	0	—	
John Watson	FW	1989–1990	14	0	20	2	None	0	0	—	
Phillip Gray	FW	1990–1991	3	0	3	0	None	0	0	—	
Tony Parks	GK	1990–1991	2	0	2	0	None	0	0	—	
Phil Stant	FW	1990–1991	19	5	19	5	None	0	0	—	
Brian Talbot	MF	1990–1991	5	1	5	1	None	0	0	—	
Graham Baker	MF	1990–1992	10	1	13	1	England	0	0		
John Finch	DF	1990–1992	7	0	7	0	None	0	0	—	
Mark Tucker	DF	1990–1993	4	0	4	0	None	0	0	—	
Corey Browne	MF	1991–1992	1	0	2	1	None	0	0	—	
George Georgiou	FW	1991–1992	4	0	5	0	None	0	0	—	
David Byrne	MF	1992	5	0	5	0	None	0	0	—	
Steve Archibald	FW	1992–1993	2	0	2	0	Scotland	27	4	—	
Danny Bailey	MF	1992–1993	3	0	3	0	None	0	0	—	
Alan Gough	GK	1992–1993	3	0	3	0	None	0	0	—	
Junior Lewis	MF	1992–1993	6	0	7	0	None	0	0	—	
John McGlashan	MF	1992–1993	5	1	5	1	None	0	0	—	
Mark Cooper	MF	1992–1994	14	0	16	0	None	0	0	—	
Paul Kelly	MF	1992–1994	6	0	7	0	None	0	0	—	
Lee Tierling	MF	1992–1994	19	0	20	0	None	0	0	—	
Paul Mahorn	MF	1993–1994	3	0	3	0	None	0	0	—	
Lee Harrison	GK	1993–1996	12	0	13	0	None	0	0	—	
Alan Cork	MF	1994–1995	15	3	22	4	None	0	0	—	
John Gregory	GK	1994–1995	1	0	1	0	None	0	0	—	
Mark Stallard	FW	1994–1995	4	3	4	3	None	0	0	—	
Carl Bartley	FW	1994–1996	1	0	2	0	None	0	0	—	
Danny Bolt	MF	1994–1996	13	2	20	2	None	0	0	—	
Tony Finnigan	DF	1994–1996	13	0	15	0	None	0	0	—	
Phil Barber	MF	1995–1996	13	0	13	0	None	0	0	—	
Martin Grant	MF	1995–1996	6	0	6	0	None	0	0	—	
Mark Taylor	DF	1995–1996	7	0	8	0	None	0	0	—	
Danny Bower	DF	1995–1996	4	0	4	0	None	0	0	—	
Gary Simpson	DF	1995–1996	7	0	7	0	None	0	0	—	
Carl Williams	MF	1995–1996	13	0	14	0	None	0	0	—	
Lea Barkus	MF	1995–1997	9	1	14	2	None	0	0	—	
John Hamshier	DF	1996–1997	3	0	3	0	None	0	0	—	
Charlie Hartfield	MF	1996–1997	2	0	2	0	None	0	0	—	
Jason Soloman	DF	1996–1997	3	0	3	0	None	0	0	—	
Simon Stewart	DF	1996–1998	4	0	4	0	None	0	0	—	
Aidan Newhouse	FW	1997	8	1	12	4	None	0	0	—	
Paul Parker	DF	1997	3	0	3	0	England	19	0	—	
Christer Warren	MF	1997	11	1	11	1	None	0	0	—	
Andre Arendse	GK	1997–1998	6	0	9	0	South Africa	67	0	—	
Andy Arnott	FW	1997–1998	1	0	1	0	None	0	0	—	
Carl Lightbourne	FW	1997–1998	4	2	4	2	None	0	0	—	
Leon McKenzie	FW	1997–1998	3	0	3	0	None	0	0	—	
Tony Thorpe	FW	1997–1998	15	3	15	3	None	0	0	—	
Shaun Maher	DF	1997–1999	0	0	2	0	None	0	0	—	
Steve McAnespie	DF	1997–2000	7	0	11	0	None	0	0	—	
Ian Selley	MF	1997–2000	3	0	3	0	England	0	0		
Luke Cornwall	FW	1997–2003	4	1	7	1	None	0	0	—	
Kyle Lightbourne	FW	1998	4	2	5	3	Bermuda	40	16	—	
Matt Brazier	MF	1998–1999	9	1	13	1	None	0	0	—	
Francois Keller	MF	1998–1999	1	0	1	0	None	0	0	—	
John Salako	MF	1998–1999	10	1	17	2	England	5	0	—	
Jamie Smith	DF	1998–1999	9	1	9	1	None	0	0	—	
Kevin Betsy	MF	1998–2002	15	1	19	1	Seychelles	5	1	—	
Philippe Albert	DF	1999	13	2	13	2	Belgium	41	5	—	
Danny Cadamarteri	FW	1999	5	1	5	1	England	0	0		
Stan Collymore	FW	1999	6	0	9	1	England	3	0	—	
Stephen Hughes	MF	1999	3	0	4	0	England	0	0		
Kevin Ball	MF	1999–2000	18	0	20	0	None	0	0	—	
Terry Phelan	DF	1999–2001	19	2	20	2	Republic of Ireland	1	0	—	
Marcus Hahnemann	GK	1999–2002	2	0	4	0	United States	9	0	—	
Peter Møller	FW	2000–2001	5	1	5	1	Denmark	20	5	—	
Nicolas Sahnoun	MF	2000–2001	7	0	9	0	None	0	0	—	
Eddie Lewis	MF	2000–2002	16	0	22	1	United States	82	10	—	
Calum Willock	FW	2000–2003	5	0	5	0	Saint Kitts and Nevis	3	3	—	
Mark Hudson	DF	2000–2004	0	0	3	0	None	0	0	—	
Elvis Hammond *	FW	2000–2005	11	0	13	0	Ghana	1	0	—	
Dean Leacock *	DF	2001–2006	9	0	13	0	None	0	0	—	
Pierre Womé	FW	2002–2003	14	1	19	1	Cameroon	69	5	—	
Martín Herrera	GK	2002–2004	2	0	2	0	None	0	0	—	
Bobby Petta	MF	2003–2004	8	0	13	0	None	0	0	—	
Jérôme Bonnissel	MF	2003–2005	16	0	16	0	None	0	0	—	
Malik Buari	MF	2003–2005	3	0	5	0	None	0	0	—	
Adam Green *	DF	2003–2006	8	0	13	0	None	0	0	—	
Darren Pratley *	MF	2003–2006	1	0	2	0	None	0	0	—	
Mark Crossley	GK	2003–2007	19	0	23	0	Wales	8	0	(Note: Mark Crossley was born in England and represented them at under-21 level before switching his allegiance to Wales)	
Billy McKinlay	MF	2004–2005	2	0	3	0	Scotland	29	4	—	
Liam Fontaine *	DF	2004–2006	1	0	2	0	England	0	0	(Note: Represented England at under-20 level.)	
Ricardo Batista *	GK	2004–2008	0	0	1	0	Portugal	0	0	(Note: Represented Portugal at under-21 level.)	
Michael Timlin *	MF	2004–2008	0	0	4	0	Republic of Ireland	0	0	(Note: Represented the Republic of Ireland at under-21 level.)	
Simon Elliott	MF	2005–2007	12	0	13	0	New Zealand	69	6	—	
Ahmad Elrich	MF	2005–2007	6	0	9	0	Australia	17	5	—	
Niclas Jensen	DF	2005–2007	16	0	18	0	Denmark	62	0	—	
Rob Milsom *	MF	2005–2010	1	0	2	0	None	0	0	—	
Wayne Bridge	DF	2006	12	0	12	0	England	36	1	—	
Elliot Omozusi *	DF	2006–2010	8	0	11	0	England	0	0	(Note: Represented England at under-19 level.)	
Jan Laštůvka *	GK	2006–2007	8	0	12	0	Czech Republic ^	3	0	—	
Björn Runström	FW	2006–2008	1	0	2	0	Sweden	0	0	(Note: Represented Sweden at under-21 level.)	
Gabriel Zakuani *	DF	2006–2009	0	0	2	0	DR Congo	25	0	—	
Vincenzo Montella	FW	2007	10	2	14	5	Italy	20	3	—	
Nathan Ashton *	DF	2007–2008	1	0	1	0	England	0	0		
Kasey Keller	GK	2007–2008	13	0	14	0	United States	102	0	—	
Shefki Kuqi	FW	2007–2008	10	0	10	0	Finland	62	8	—	
Dejan Stefanović	DF	2007–2008	13	0	15	0	Serbia	20	0	—	
Hamer Bouazza	FW	2007–2009	20	1	22	1	Algeria	21	3	—	
Wayne Brown *	MF	2007–2010	1	0	2	0	None	0	0	—	
Paul Stalteri	DF	2008	13	0	13	0	Canada	84	7	—	
Eddie Johnson	FW	2008–2011	19	0	22	0	United States	63	19	—	
Leon Andreasen *	DF	2008–2009	19	0	21	0	Denmark	20	3	—	
Julian Gray	MF	2008–2009	1	0	3	0	None	0	0	—	
Joe Anderson *	DF	2008–2010	0	0	1	0	None	0	0	—	
Toni Kallio	DF	2008–2010	4	0	7	0	Finland	49	2	—	
Chris Smalling *	DF	2008–2010	13	0	19	0	England ^	31	1	—	
Andranik Teymourian *	DF	2008–2010	1	0	2	0	Iran	101	9	—	
Fredrik Stoor *	DF	2008–2011	4	0	10	0	Sweden	11	0	—	
Pascal Zuberbühler	GK	2008–2011	0	0	1	0	Switzerland	51	0	—	
Neil Etheridge *	GK	2008–2014	0	0	1	0	Philippines ^	62	0	(Note: Neil Etheridge represented England at under-16 level before switching allegiance to the Philippines.)	
Olivier Dacourt	MF	2009	9	0	12	0	France	21	1	—	
Kagisho Dikgacoi	MF	2009–2011	13	0	16	0	South Africa	54	2	—	
David Elm *	FW	2009–2011	10	1	17	1	None	0	0	—	
Stefano Okaka *	FW	2010	11	2	13	3	Italy ^	4	1	—	
Nicky Shorey	DF	2010	9	0	12	0	England	2	0	—	
Rafik Halliche *	DF	2010–2012	1	0	2	0	Algeria ^	39	3	—	
Eiður Guðjohnsen	FW	2011	10	0	10	0	Iceland	88	26	—	
Gaël Kakuta *	FW	2011	7	1	7	1	DR Congo ^	4	1	(Note: Represented France at under-21 level.)	
Marcel Gecov	MF	2011–2012	2	0	5	0	Czech Republic	1	0	—	
Zdeněk Grygera	DF	2011–2012	5	0	7	0	Czech Republic	65	2	—	
Orlando Sá *	FW	2011–2012	7	1	12	1	Portugal	1	0	—	
Lauri Dalla Valle	FW	2011–2013	0	0	2	0	Finland	0	0	(Note: Represented Finland at under-21 level.)	
Tom Donegan *	MF	2011–2013	0	0	1	0	None	0	0	—	
Muamer Tanković *	FW	2011–2014	3	0	6	0	Sweden	1	0	—	
Marcello Trotta ‡	FW	2011–2015	1	0	3	0	Italy	0	0	(Note: Represented Italy at under-21 level.)	
Pavel Pogrebnyak *	FW	2012	12	6	12	6	Russia	33	8	—	
Mladen Petrić *	FW	2012–2013	23	5	24	5	Croatia	45	13	—	
Alex Smith *	MF	2012–2013	1	0	1	0	None	0	0	—	
Mahamadou Diarra	MF	2012–2014	23	1	23	1	Mali	69	6	—	
Urby Emanuelson *	MF	2013	13	1	13	1	Netherlands	16	0	—	
Eyong Enoh *	MF	2013	9	0	9	0	Cambodia	51	2	—	
Emmanuel Frimpong	MF	2013	6	0	6	0	Ghana	1	0	(Note: Represented England at under-17 level.)	
Stanislav Manolev *	MF	2013	5	0	5	0	Bulgaria ^	51	5	—	
Derek Boateng	MF	2013–2014	3	0	5	0	Ghana	47	1	—	
Adel Taarabt *	MF	2013–2014	12	0	16	1	Morocco ^	18	4	—	
Chris David *	MF	2013–2015	6	1	10	1	Netherlands	0	0	(Note: Represented the Netherlands at under-21 level.)	
Maarten Stekelenburg *	GK	2013–2016	19	0	21	0	Netherlands ^	58	0	—	
Johnny Heitinga	DF	2014	14	1	14	1	Netherlands	87	7	—	
Lewis Holtby *	MF	2014	13	1	13	1	Germany ^	3	0	—	
William Kvist	MF	2014	8	0	8	0	Denmark	81	2	—	
Kostas Mitroglou *	FW	2014	3	0	3	0	Greece ^	64	17	—	
Mesca *	MF	2014–2015	1	0	1	0	Portugal	0	0	(Note: Represented Portugal at under-19 level.)	
Josh Passley *	DF	2014–2015	0	0	2	0	None	0	0		
Patrick Roberts *	FW	2014–2015	19	0	23	0	England	0	0		
Adil Chihi *	MF	2014–2015	1	0	1	0	Morocco	2	0	—	
Thomas Eisfeld *	MF	2014–2015	7	0	9	0	Germany	0	0	(Note: Represented Germany at under-20 level.)	
Mark Fotheringham	MF	2014–2015	2	0	3	0	Scotland	0	0	(Note: Represented Scotland at under-21 level.)	
Gábor Király	GK	2014–2015	4	0	5	0	Hungary	108	0	—	
Ryan Williams *	MF	2014–2015	2	0	3	0	Australia	0	0	(Note: Represented Australia at under-23 level.)	
Elsad Zverotić *	DF	2014–2015	16	0	21	0	Monaco ^	61	5	—	
Stephen Arthurworrey *	DF	2014–2016	0	0	1	0	None	0	0	—	
Ange-Freddy Plumain *	MF	2014–2016	0	0	2	0	France	0	0	(Note: Represented England at under-18 level.)	
Kay Voser *	DF	2014–2016	10	0	13	0	Switzerland	0	0	(Note: Represented Switzerland at under-21 level.)	
Cameron Burgess *	MF	2014–2017	4	0	4	0	Australia	0	0	(Note: Represented Australia at under-23 level after previously playing for Scotland at under-23 level.)	
Larnell Cole *	MF	2014–2017	1	0	1	0	England	0	0		
Jesse Joronen *	GK	2014–2017	4	0	7	0	Finland ^	8	0	—	
George Williams *	MF	2014–2018	15	0	17	0	Wales ^	7	0	—	
Danny Guthrie *	MF	2015	6	0	6	0	England	0	0	(Note: Represented England at under-16 level.)	
James Husband *	DF	2015	17	0	17	0	None	0	0	—	
Michael Turner *	DF	2015	9	1	9	1	None	0	0	—	
Joe Lewis *	GK	2015–2016	8	0	9	0	England	0	0		
Sakari Mattila *	MF	2015–2016	6	0	9	0	Finland ^	16	0	—	
Ben Pringle *	MF	2015–2016	15	2	18	2	None	0	0	—	
Jack Grimmer *	MF	2015–2017	13	0	19	0	Scotland	0	0		
Rohan Ince *	MF	2016	10	1	10	1	None	0	0	—	
Zakaria Labyad *	MF	2016	2	0	2	0	Morocco ^	6	0	—	
Luca de la Torre ‡	MF	2016–	5	0	11	1	United States ^	1	0	—	
Tayo Edun ‡	DF	2016–	2	0	7	0	England ^	0	0		
Stephen Humphrys *	FW	2016–2019	2	0	3	0	None	0	0	—	
Dennis Adeniran *	MF	2016–2017	1	0	5	1	England ^	0	0		
Jozabed *	MF	2016–2017	1	0	5	1	None	0	0	—	
Ragnar Sigurðsson *	GK	2016–2018	17	1	18	1	Iceland	80	3	—	
Cyriac *	FW	2017	9	1	11	1	Ivory Coast ^	9	2	—	
Thanos Petsos *	MF	2017	0	0	1	0	Greece ^	4	0	—	
Ibrahima Cissé ‡	MF	2017–	9	0	13	0	Guinea ^	9	1	—	
Marcelo Djaló ‡	DF	2017–	2	0	4	0	None	0	0	—	
Matt O'Riley ‡	MF	2017–	0	0	3	0	England ^	0	0	(Note: Represented England at under-18 level.)	
Marek Rodák ‡	GK	2017–	0	0	2	0	Slovakia ^	0	0	(Note: Represented Slovakia at under-21 level.)	
Steven Sessegnon ‡	MF	2017–	1	0	5	0	England ^	0	0		
Sheyi Ojo *	MF	2017–2018	22	4	24	4	England ^	0	0		
Jordan Graham *	MF	2017–2018	3	0	3	0	England	0	0	(Note: Represented Ireland at under-15 level before switching to England)	
Yohan Mollo *	FW	2017–2018	6	0	6	0	France	0	0		
Rafa Soares *	DF	2017–2018	3	0	3	0	Portugal	0	0		
Matt Targett *	DF	2018	18	1	21	1	England	0	0		
Fabri ‡	GK	2018–	2	0	2	0	Spain	0	0	(Note: Represented Spain at under-20 level.)	
Alfie Mawson ‡	DF	2018–	21	0	22	0	England	0	0		
Harvey Elliott *	MF	2018–2019	2	0	3	0	England	0	0		
Timothy Fosu-Mensah *	DF	2018–2019	12	0	13	0	Netherlands ^	3	0	—	
Luciano Vietto *	FW	2018–2019	20	1	22	1	Argentina	0	0	(Note: Represented Argentina at under-20 level.)	
Ryan Babel *	FW	2019	16	5	16	5	Netherlands ^	57	8	—	
Lazar Marković *	MF	2019	2	0	2	0	Serbia ^	22	3	—	
Håvard Nordtveit *	DF	2019	5	0	5	0	Norway ^	37	2	—	
Harry Arter ‡	MF	2019–2020	5	0	5	0	Republic of Ireland ^	15	0	(Note: Born in England but represented Ireland in international football.)	
Ivan Cavaleiro ‡	FW	2019–	6	3	6	3	Portugal ^	2	0		
Tyrese Francois ‡	MF	2019–	0	0	1	0	None	0	0	—	
Anthony Knockaert ‡	MF	2019–	6	1	6	1	France	0	0		
Josh Onomah ‡	MF	2019–	0	0	1	0	None	0	0		
Harrison Reed ‡	MF	2019–	3	0	3	0	England	0	0		
Bobby De Cordova-Reid ‡	FW	2019–	4	0	5	0	None	0	0	—	
Martell Taylor-Crossdale ‡	FW	2019–2021	0	0	1	0	None	0	0	—	
