= List of people from the London Borough of Wandsworth =

The following is a list of those who were born in the London Borough of Wandsworth, or have lived/live within the borders of the modern borough (in alphabetical order):

- Phil Collins - musician, singer, songwriter
- Kyle Sinckler — rugby player
- Leomie Anderson - model
- Michail Antonio — footballer
- Jonathan Ansell — singer
- Alun Armstrong — actor
- Martin Bashir — journalist
- Tony Blair — former Prime Minister (shared a house with Lord Charlie Falconer in the Tonsleys on Bramford Road)
- Derek James Fowlds - Actor
- Emily Blunt — actress
- Ernie Bowering — footballer
- Edward James Boys — military historian
- Marcus Brigstocke — comedian
- Ben Bruce — musician, lead guitarist of Asking Alexandria
- Frank Bruno — boxer
- Daisy Burrell — actress
- Charles Bernard Childs — physicist
- Thomas Craig — actor
- Sophie Dahl — model
- Jack Dee — comedian
- Daniel Defoe — author
- Lesley-Anne Down — actor
- Yootha Joyce — actress
- George Eliot — author
- Lord Charlie Falconer — politician (shared a house with Tony Blair in the Tonsleys on Bramford Road)
- Jason Flemyng — actor
- Edward Gibbon — historian
- Francis Grose — antiquary, lived in Mulberry Cottage on the Common (1731–1791)
- Thomas Hardy — author (a blue plaque at the junction of Trinity Road and Broderick Road commemorates his residence)
- Ainsley Harriott — TV chef
- Callum Hudson-Odoi — footballer
- Mick Jones — guitarist/songwriter (The Clash, Big Audio Dynamite)
- Mollie King — member of girl band The Saturdays
- Keira Knightley — actress, lived on Swaffield Road
- Gabrielle Lambrick - civil servant, teacher and historian
- David Lloyd George — former Prime Minister
- Ademola Lookman — footballer
- Lionel Marson — actor, British Army officer, cricketer
- Martin Marquez — actor
- Ramona Marquez — actress
- Daniel Massey — actor
- Irene Mawer — mime artist and educator
- Michael Nicholson — journalist
- Mark Owen — singer
- Harry S. Pepper — BBC producer and songwriter
- Kevin Pietersen — cricketer
- Brian Sibley — writer
- Steve Sidwell — footballer
- Phil Spencer — TV presenter
- Jessica Taylor — singer with Liberty X
- William Makepeace Thackeray — novelist
- Louis Theroux — TV presenter
- Paul Theroux — travel writer
- Hannah Waddingham - actress
- Andrew Wakely — musician
- Penelope Wilton — actor
- Ed Wynne — musician
- Phil Coulter, Musician and songwriter
