= William Maughan =

William Maughan may refer to:

- William Maughan (footballer) (1894–1916), English footballer
- William Ryott Maughan (1863–1933), English-born Australian politician
