= Samuel Henderson =

Samuel Henderson may refer to:

- Samuel Henderson (Pennsylvania politician) (1764–1841), member of the U.S. House of Representatives from Pennsylvania
- Samuel Henderson (Indianapolis mayor) (c. 1800–1883), first mayor of Indianapolis, Indiana
- Samuel Henderson (born 1827) (c. 1827–1907), African-American groundskeeper and Catholic convert, under consideration for beatification
- Sam Henderson (footballer), English footballer

== See also ==
- Sam Henderson (born 1969), American cartoonist, writer, and expert on American comedy history
