= John Houghton =

John Houghton may refer to:

== Politicians ==
- John Houghton (fl.1393), MP for Leicester (UK Parliament constituency)
- John Houghton (died 1583) (before 1522–1583), MP for Stamford (UK Parliament constituency)
- John Houghton (Manx politician) (born 1958/1959), Manx politician
- John Houghton (Zimbabwean politician) (born 1945), Zimbabwean politician, MP (since 2018)

== Others ==
- John Houghton (physicist) (1931–2020), Welsh atmospheric physicist
- John Houghton (martyr) (c. 1486–1535), English Catholic priest and martyr
- John Houghton (apothecary) (1645–1705), English writer, apothecary and merchant
- John Houghton (footballer) (1945–2019), New Zealand international footballer
- John Houghton (footballer born 1891) (1891–1991), English footballer
- John Houghton (rugby league) (fl. 1970), former St Helens RLFC rugby player
