= 2011–12 Fulham F.C. season =

Fulham
2011–12 season
- Chairman: Mohamed al-Fayed
- Manager: Martin Jol
- Stadium: Craven Cottage
- Premier League: 9th
- FA Cup: Fourth round
- League Cup: Third round
- UEFA Europa League: Group stage
- Top goalscorer: League: Clint Dempsey (17); All: Clint Dempsey (23)
- Highest home attendance: 25,700
- Lowest home attendance: 14,110
- Average home league attendance: 22,611
- Biggest win: 6–0 vs. Queens Park Rangers
- Biggest defeat: 5–0 vs. Manchester United
Home colours	Away colours	Third colours

The 2011–12 season was Fulham's 114th professional season and their 11th consecutive season in the top flight of English football, the Premier League. They also competed in the FA Cup, the League Cup, and the Europa League. Fulham finished the season in ninth place after their last league match against Tottenham Hotspur resulted in a 0–2 defeat on 13 May 2012.

== Premier League ==
=== League table ===
Pos	Team	Pld	W	D	L	GF	GA	GD	Pts	Qualification or relegation
7	Everton	38	15	11	12	50	40	+10	56	
8	Liverpool	38	14	10	14	47	40	+7	52	Qualification for the Europa League third qualifying round (Note: Liverpool won the League Cup and thus qualified for the Europa League third qualifying round.)
9	Fulham	38	14	10	14	48	51	−3	52	
10	West Bromwich Albion	38	13	8	17	45	52	−7	47	
11	Swansea City	38	12	11	15	44	51	−7	47	

Source: Barclays Premier League
Rules for classification: 1) points; 2) goal difference; 3) number of goals scored.

=== Results summary ===
Overall								Home						Away					
Pld	W	D	L	GF	GA	GD	Pts	W	D	L	GF	GA	GD	W	D	L	GF	GA	GD
38	14	10	14	48	51	−3	52	10	5	4	36	26	+10	4	5	10	12	25	−13

Last updated: 13 May 2012..

Round	1	2	3	4	5	6	7	8	9	10	11	12	13	14	15	16	17	18	19	20	21	22	23	24	25	26	27	28	29	30	31	32	33	34	35	36	37	38
Ground	H	A	A	H	H	A	H	A	H	A	H	A	A	H	A	H	H	A	A	H	A	H	H	A	H	A	H	A	H	A	H	A	H	H	A	A	H	A
Result	D	L	L	D	D	D	W	L	L	W	L	D	D	W	L	W	L	D	D	W	L	W	D	L	W	W	W	L	L	L	W	W	D	W	L	W	W	L
Position	9	15	16	18	18	17	12	12	17	15	16	16	15	13	14	11	13	13	13	13	14	12	13	14	12	11	8	10	11	13	11	10	9	9	9	9	8	9

Updated to match(es) played on 13 May. Source: premierleague.com
A = Away; H = Home; W = Win; D = Draw; L = Loss

=== Results ===
13 August 2011 1	Fulham	0–0	Aston Villa	London
15:00 BST		Report		Stadium: Craven Cottage; Attendance: 25,700; Referee: Lee Mason

21 August 2011 2	Wolverhampton Wanderers	2–0	Fulham	Wolverhampton
14:00 BST	Doyle 42'; Jarvis 45+1'	Report		Stadium: Molineux Stadium; Attendance: 22,657; Referee: Mike Dean

28 August 2011 3	Newcastle United	2–1	Fulham	Newcastle upon Tyne
13:00 BST	Best 48', 66'; Simpson (yellow card) 87'; Smith (yellow card) 90+5'	Report	Sidwell (yellow card) 64'; Dempsey 88'	Stadium: St James' Park; Attendance: 42,684 (443 away); Referee: Kevin Friend

11 September 2011 4	Fulham	1–1	Blackburn Rovers	London
16:00 BST	Zamora 38'	Report	Rochina 32'	Stadium: Craven Cottage; Attendance: 24,856; Referee: Howard Webb

18 September 2011 5	Fulham	2–2	Manchester City	London
15:00 BST	Zamora 55'; Kompany 75' (o.g.)	Report	Agüero 18', 46'	Stadium: Craven Cottage; Attendance: 24,750; Referee: Mark Clattenburg

24 September 2011 6	West Bromwich Albion	0–0	Fulham	West Bromwich
15:00 BST		Report		Stadium: The Hawthorns; Attendance: 23,835; Referee: Stuart Attwell

2 October 2011 7	Fulham	6–0	Queens Park Rangers	London
15:00 BST	Johnson 2', 38', 59'; Sidwell (yellow card) 5'; Murphy 20' (pen.); Dempsey 65'; Hangeland (yellow card) 69'; Zamora 74'	Report	Hall (yellow card) 61'; Faurlín (yellow card) 68'; Wright-Phillips (yellow card) 82'	Stadium: Craven Cottage; Attendance: 23,835; Referee: Stuart Attwell

15 October 2011 8	Stoke City	2–0	Fulham	Stoke-on-Trent
15:00 BST	Walters 80'; Delap 87'	Report		Stadium: Britannia Stadium; Attendance: 23,835; Referee: Martin Atkinson

23 October 2011 9	Fulham	1–3	Everton	London
13:30 BST	Ruiz 67'	Report	Drenthe 3'; Saha 90'; Rodwell 90+3'	Stadium: Craven Cottage; Attendance: 25,646; Referee: Lee Probert

29 October 2011 10	Wigan Athletic	0–2	Fulham	Wigan
15:00 BST		Report	Dempsey 41'; Dembélé 86'	Stadium: DW Stadium; Attendance: 15,796; Referee: Mike Jones

6 November 2011 11	Fulham	1–3	Tottenham Hotspur	London
16:00 GMT	Kaboul 57' (o.g.)	Report	Bale 10'; Lennon 45+3'; Kaboul (yellow card) 69'; Defoe 90+5'	Stadium: Craven Cottage; Attendance: 25,698; Referee: Peter Walton

19 November 2011 12	Sunderland	0–0	Fulham	Sunderland
15:00 GMT		Report		Stadium: Stadium of Light; Attendance: 37,688; Referee: Anthony Taylor

26 November 2011 13	Arsenal	1–1	Fulham	London
17:30 GMT	Vermaelen 82'	Report	Vermaelen 65' (o.g.)	Stadium: Emirates Stadium; Attendance: 60,043; Referee: Mike Dean

5 December 2011 14	Fulham	1–0	Liverpool	London
20:00 GMT	Dembélé (yellow card) 45'; Dempsey (yellow card) 48', (goal) 85'; Senderos (yellow card) 59'	Report	Bellamy (yellow card) 48'; Spearing (red card) 72'	Stadium: Craven Cottage; Attendance: 25,688; Referee: Kevin Friend

10 December 2011 15	Swansea City	2–0	Fulham	Swansea
15:00 GMT	Sinclair 56'; Graham 90+1'	Report		Stadium: Liberty Stadium; Attendance: 19,286; Referee: Jonathan Moss

17 December 2011 16	Fulham	2–0	Bolton Wanderers	London
15:00 GMT	Dempsey 32'; Ruiz 34'	Report		Stadium: Craven Cottage; Attendance: 25,643; Referee: Chris Foy

21 December 2011 17	Fulham	0–5	Manchester United	London
20:00 GMT		Report	Welbeck 5'; Nani 28'; Giggs 43'; Rooney 88'; Berbatov 90'	Stadium: Craven Cottage; Attendance: 25,700; Referee: Mark Halsey

26 December 2011 18	Chelsea	1–1	Fulham	London
13:00 GMT	Mata 47'	Report	Dempsey 56'	Stadium: Stamford Bridge; Attendance: 41,548; Referee: Kevin Friend

31 December 2011 19	Norwich City	1–1	Fulham	Norwich
15:00 GMT	Jackson 90+4'	Report	Sá 7'	Stadium: Carrow Road; Attendance: 26,406; Referee: Howard Webb

2 January 2012 20	Fulham	2–1	Arsenal	London
17:30 GMT	Sidwell 85'; Zamora 90+2'	Report	Koscielny 21'; Djourou (yellow card) 63' (yellow-red card) 78'	Stadium: Craven Cottage; Attendance: 25,700; Referee: Lee Probert

14 January 2012 21	Blackburn Rovers	3–1	Fulham	Blackburn
15:00 GMT	Pedersen 45+4'; Dunn 46'; Formica 79'	Report	Duff 56'	Stadium: Ewood Park; Attendance: 18,003; Referee: Anthony Taylor

21 January 2012 22	Fulham	5–2	Newcastle United	London
15:00 GMT	Murphy 52' (pen.); Dempsey 59', 65', 89'; Zamora 68' (pen.)	Report	Guthrie 43'; Ben Arfa 85'	Stadium: Craven Cottage; Attendance: 25,692; Referee: Lee Mason

1 February 2012 23	Fulham	1–1	West Bromwich Albion	London
19:45 GMT	Dempsey 69'	Report	Tchoyi 82'	Stadium: Craven Cottage; Attendance: 25,689; Referee: Mark Halsey

4 February 2012 24	Manchester City	3–0	Fulham	Manchester
15:00 GMT	Agüero 10' (pen.); Baird 30' (o.g.); Džeko 72'	Report		Stadium: City of Manchester Stadium; Attendance: 46,963; Referee: Mike Dean

11 February 2012 25	Fulham	2–1	Stoke City	London
15:00 GMT	Pogrebnyak 16'; Sørensen 28' (o.g.)	Report	Shawcross 78'	Stadium: Craven Cottage; Attendance: 23,555; Referee: Chris Foy

25 February 2012 26	Queens Park Rangers	0–1	Fulham	London
15:00 GMT	Diakité (yellow card) 20' (yellow-red card) 33'	Report	Pogrebnyak 7', (yellow card) 7'; Dembélé (yellow card) 65'; J. A. Riise (yellow card) 69'; Baird (yellow card) 85'	Stadium: Loftus Road; Attendance: 18,015; Referee: Phil Dowd

4 March 2012 27	Fulham	5–0	Wolverhampton Wanderers	London
14:05 GMT	Hangeland (yellow card) 22'; Pogrebnyak 36', 44', 61'; Dempsey 56', 83'	Report	Zubar (yellow card) 7'; Berra (yellow card) 73'	Stadium: Craven Cottage; Attendance: 24,034; Referee: Mike Jones

10 March 2012 28	Aston Villa	1–0	Fulham	Birmingham
15:00 GMT	Petrov (yellow card) 66'; Herd (yellow card) 73'; Weimann 90+2'	Report		Stadium: Villa Park; Attendance: 32,372; Referee: Jonathan Moss

17 March 2012 29	Fulham	0–3	Swansea City	London
15:00 GMT		Report	Sigurðsson 36', 66'; Allen 77'	Stadium: Craven Cottage; Attendance: 25,690; Referee: Mark Halsey

26 March 2012 30	Manchester United	1–0	Fulham	Manchester
20:00 BST	Giggs (yellow card) 34'; Rooney 42'	Report		Stadium: Old Trafford; Attendance: 75,570 (320 away); Referee: Michael Oliver

31 March 2012 31	Fulham	2–1	Norwich City	London
15:00 BST	Dempsey 2'; Duff 13'; Etuhu (yellow card) 89'	Report	Ward (yellow card) 26'; Fox (yellow card) 54'; Wilbraham 77'	Stadium: Craven Cottage; Attendance: 25,700; Referee: Anthony Taylor

7 April 2012 32	Bolton Wanderers	0–3	Fulham	Manchester
15:00 BST	Ricketts (yellow card) 90+3'	Report	Dempsey 30', 45'; Diarra 80'	Stadium: Reebok Stadium; Attendance: 21,939; Referee: Mike Dean

9 April 2012 33	Fulham	1–1	Chelsea	Fulham
20:00	Dempsey 82'	Report	Lampard 45' (pen.)	Stadium: Craven Cottage; Attendance: 25,697; Referee: Mark Clattenburg

21 April 2012 34	Fulham	2–1	Wigan Athletic	Fulham
15:00	Pogrebnyak 58'; Senderos 89'	Report	Boyce 57'	Stadium: Craven Cottage; Attendance: 25,689; Referee: Lee Mason

28 April 2012 35	Everton	4–0	Fulham	Liverpool
15:00	Jelavić 7', 40'; Fellaini 16'; Cahill 60'	Report		Stadium: Goodison Park; Attendance: 31,885; Referee: Phil Dowd

1 May 2012 36	Liverpool	0–1	Fulham	Liverpool
19:45		Report	Škrtel 5' (o.g.)	Stadium: Anfield; Attendance: 40,106; Referee: Lee Probert

6 May 2012 37	Fulham	2–1	Sunderland	London
14:00	Dempsey 12'; Dembélé 35'	Report	Bardsley 34'	Stadium: Craven Cottage; Attendance: 25,683; Referee: Martin Atkinson

13 May 2012 38	Tottenham Hotspur	2–0	Fulham	London
15:00	Adebayor 2'; Defoe 63'	Report		Stadium: White Hart Lane; Attendance: 36,256; Referee: Phil Dowd

== FA Cup ==
7 January 2012 3rd Round	Fulham	4–0	Charlton	London
15:00 GMT	Dempsey 8', 61', 81' (pen.); Duff 87'	Report	Green (yellow card) 34'	Stadium: Craven Cottage; Attendance: 20,317; Referee: Phil Dowd

27 January 2012 4th Round	Everton	2–1	Fulham	Liverpool
20:00 GMT	Heitinga (yellow card) 13'; Stracqualursi 27'; Gibson (yellow card) 37'; Cahill (yellow card) 57'; Fellaini 73'	Report	Murphy 14' (pen.); Baird (yellow card) 73'; Dempsey (yellow card) 86'	Stadium: Goodison Park; Attendance: 25,300; Referee: Howard Webb

== Football League Cup ==
21 September 2011 3rd Round	Chelsea	0–0 (a.e.t.) (4–3 p)	Fulham	London
19:45 BST	Alex (red card) 47'; Lampard (yellow card) 120'	Fulham report BBC Sport report	Frei (yellow card) 98'	Stadium: Stamford Bridge; Attendance: 37,632; Referee: Chris Foy
	Penalties
	Lampard (penalty missed); David Luiz (penalty scored); Terry (penalty scored); Kalou (penalty scored); Malouda (penalty scored)		(penalty scored) Zamora; (penalty scored) Sidwell; (penalty missed) Dembélé; (penalty scored) Baird; (penalty missed) Ruiz

== UEFA Europa League ==
=== Qualifying ===
Fulham entered at the First qualifying round, having qualified through the UEFA Fair Play League. The First and Second Qualifying Round draws took place at UEFA headquarters in Nyon, Switzerland, on 20 June 2011, while the Third Qualifying Round and Play-off draws were also held at UEFA headquarters in Nyon on 15 July 2011 and 5 August 2011 respectively.

30 June 2011 Q1 Leg 1	Fulham (England)	3–0	(Faroe Islands) NSÍ Runavík	London
19:30 BST	Duff 33'; Murphy 61' (pen.); Johnson 70'	Fulham report UEFA report	Petersen (yellow card) 60'	Stadium: Craven Cottage; Attendance: 14,910; Referee: Bernhard Brugger (Austria)

7 July 2011 Q1 Leg 2	NSÍ Runavík (Faroe Islands)	0–0 (3–0 agg.)	(England) Fulham	Toftir
18:45 BST	Joensen (yellow card) 38'	Fulham report UEFA report	Sidwell (yellow card) 53'	Stadium: Svangaskarð; Attendance: 1,245; Referee: Nikolaj Hänni (Switzerland)

14 July 2011 Q2 Leg 1	Crusaders (Northern Ireland)	1–3	(England) Fulham	Belfast
19:45 BST	Watson (yellow card) 53'; Adamson 54'; Leeman (yellow card) 63'	Fulham report UEFA report	Briggs 39'; Frei (yellow card) 62'; Zamora 74'; Murphy 77' (pen.)	Stadium: Seaview; Attendance: 3,011; Referee: Clément Turpin (France)

21 July 2011 Q2 Leg 2	Fulham (England)	4–0 (1–7 agg.)	(Northern Ireland) Crusaders	London
19:30 BST	Johnson 19'; Duff 56'; Zamora 66'; Sidwell 70'	Fulham report UEFA report		Stadium: Craven Cottage; Attendance: 15,676; Referee: Marios Stamatis (Cyprus)

28 July 2011 Q3 Leg 1	RNK Split (Croatia)	0–0	(England) Fulham	Dugopolje
18:30 BST		Fulham report UEFA report	Etuhu (yellow card) 21'; Sidwell (yellow card) 77'	Stadium: Stadion Hrvatski vitezovi Attendance: 9,987; Referee: Sergei Karasev (Russia)

4 August 2011 Q3 Leg 2	Fulham (England)	2–0 (0–2 agg.)	(Croatia) RNK Split	London
19:30 BST	Johnson 19', (yellow card) 59'; Murphy 57' (pen.), (yellow card) 84'; Briggs (yellow card) 87'	Fulham report UEFA report	Baraban (yellow card) 44'; Vidić (yellow card) 56'; Marčić (yellow card) 87'; Rašić (yellow card) 89'	Stadium: Craven Cottage; Attendance: 17,087; Referee: Duarte Gomes (Portugal)

18 August 2011 Play-off Leg 1	Fulham (England)	3–0	(Ukraine) Dnipro Dnipropetrovsk	London
19:30 BST	Hughes 38'; Dempsey 43', 49'; Duff (yellow card) 65'; Zamora (yellow card) 68'	Fulham report UEFA report	Boateng (yellow card) 50'; Oliynyk (yellow card) 72'	Stadium: Craven Cottage; Attendance: 14,823; Referee: Pavel Královec (Czech Republic)

25 August 2011 Play-off Leg 2	Dnipro Dnipropetrovsk (Ukraine)	1–0 (3–1 agg.)	(England) Fulham	Dnipropetrovsk
19:30 BST	Shakhov 22'; Boateng (yellow card) 34'	Fulham report UEFA report	Murphy (yellow card) 34'; Baird (yellow card) 58'	Stadium: Dnipro Arena; Attendance: 12,100; Referee: Tom Harald Hagen (Norway)

=== Group stage ===
Key to colours in group table
Group winner and runner-up advance to the round of 32
Third and fourth placed teams cannot advance to the round of 32
Fulham's group positioning

Team	Pld	W	D	L	GF	GA	GD	Pts
(Netherlands) Twente	6	4	1	1	14	7	+7	13
(Poland) Wisła Kraków	6	3	0	3	8	13	−5	9
(England) Fulham	6	2	2	2	9	6	+3	8
(Denmark) Odense	6	1	1	4	9	14	−5	4

15 September 2011 Matchday 1	Fulham (England)	1–1	(Netherlands) Twente	London
20:05	Grygera (yellow card) 16'; Johnson 19'; Murphy (yellow card) 71'; Senderos (yellow card) 83'; Dempsey (yellow card) 90+1'	Report	Brama (yellow card) 36'; Schwarzer 41' (o.g.); Rosales (yellow card) 61'	Stadium: Craven Cottage; Attendance: 14,110; Referee: Antonio Damato (Italy)

29 September 2011 Matchday 2	Odense (Denmark)	0–2	(England) Fulham	Odense
18:00	Traoré (yellow card) 71' (yellow-red card) 90+1'	Report	Johnson 36', 88'; Senderos (yellow card) 62'; Etuhu (yellow card) 85'	Stadium: TRE-FOR Park; Attendance: 7,969; Referee: Maksim Layushkin (Russia)

20 October 2011 Matchday 3	Wisła Kraków (Poland)	1–0	(England) Fulham	Kraków
19:00	Iliev (yellow card) 2'; Chávez (yellow card) 27' (yellow-red card) 86'; Biton 60'	Report	Dembélé (red card) 29'	Stadium: Stadion im. Henryka Reymana; Attendance: 16,377; Referee: Martin Hansson (Sweden)

3 November 2011 Matchday 4	Fulham (England)	4–1	(Poland) Wisła Kraków	London
20:05	Duff 5'; Johnson 30', 57'; Zamora (yellow card) 43'; Etuhu (yellow card) 65'; Sidwell 79'	Report	Kirm 9'; Jaliens (yellow card) 43'; Paljić (yellow card) 56'; Díaz (yellow card) 66'	Stadium: Craven Cottage; Attendance: 20,319; Referee: Halis Özkahya (Turkey)

1 December 2011 Matchday 5	Twente (Netherlands)	1–0	(England) Fulham	Enschede
18:00	Janko 89'	Report	Johnson (yellow card) 63' (yellow-red card) 90+2'	Stadium: De Grolsch Veste; Attendance: 21,000; Referee: Marijo Strahonja (Croatia)

14 December 2011 Matchday 6	Fulham (England)	2–2	(Denmark) Odense	London
20:05	Dempsey 27'; Frei 31'; Gecov (yellow card) 79'	Report	Andreasen 64'; Gíslason (yellow card) 67'; Reginiussen (yellow card) 74'; Fall 90+3'	Stadium: Craven Cottage; Attendance: 15,297; Referee: Alon Yefet (Israel)

== Statistics ==
=== Appearances & goals ===
Last updated 5 May 2012

No.	Pos	Nat	Player	Total		Premier League		FA Cup		League Cup		Europa League	
No.	Pos	Nat	Player	Apps	Goals	Apps	Goals	Apps	Goals	Apps	Goals	Apps	Goals
1	GK	(Australia) AUS	Mark Schwarzer	42	0	29+0	0	0+0	0	1+0	0	12+0	0
2	DF	(Republic of Ireland) IRL	Stephen Kelly	33	0	20+3	0	2+0	0	1+0	0	7+0	0
3	DF	(Norway) NOR	John Arne Riise	42	0	34+1	0	2+0	0	0+0	0	5+0	0
4	MF	(England) ENG	Steve Sidwell	27	3	12+2	1	0+2	0	0+1	0	4+6	2
5	DF	(Norway) NOR	Brede Hangeland	52	0	37+0	0	2+0	0	0+0	0	13+0	0
6	DF	(Northern Ireland) NIR	Chris Baird	27	0	13+6	0	1+0	0	1+0	0	6+0	0
7	FW	(Russia) RUS	Pavel Pogrebnyak	11	6	11+0	6	0+0	0	0+0	0	0+0	0
8	FW	(England) ENG	Andy Johnson	33	11	13+7	3	1+0	0	0+0	0	11+1	8
9	FW	(Portugal) POR	Orlando Sá	12	1	3+4	1	0+0	0	1+0	0	1+3	0
10	MF	(Switzerland) SUI	Pajtim Kasami	16	0	3+3	0	0+1	0	1+0	0	3+5	0
11	FW	(Costa Rica) CRC	Bryan Ruiz	30	2	17+10	2	2+0	0	1+0	0	0+0	0
12	GK	(England) ENG	David Stockdale	10	0	8+0	0	2+0	0	0+0	0	0+0	0
13	MF	(England) ENG	Danny Murphy	47	6	32+3	2	2+0	1	0+0	0	10+0	3
14	DF	(Switzerland) SUI	Philippe Senderos	25	1	21+0	1	1+0	0	1+0	0	1+1	0
15	MF	(Czech Republic) CZE	Marcel Gecov	5	0	0+2	0	0+0	0	1+0	0	2+0	0
16	MF	(Republic of Ireland) IRL	Damien Duff	42	6	22+5	2	1+1	1	0+0	0	11+2	3
17	MF	(Norway) NOR	Bjørn Helge Riise	4	0	0+0	0	0+0	0	0+0	0	0+4	0
18	DF	(Northern Ireland) NIR	Aaron Hughes	27	1	17+1	0	1+0	0	0+0	0	8+0	1
19	MF	(Mali) MLI	Mahamadou Diarra	10	1	7+3	1	0+0	0	0+0	0	0+0	0
20	MF	(Nigeria) NGR	Dickson Etuhu	33	0	9+13	0	0+0	0	0+0	0	9+2	0
21	MF	(Switzerland) SUI	Kerim Frei	24	1	5+10	0	1+0	0	1+0	0	2+5	1
22	GK	(Hungary) HUN	Csaba Somogyi	0	0	0+0	0	0+0	0	0+0	0	0+0	0
23	MF	(United States) USA	Clint Dempsey	46	23	37+0	17	2+0	3	0+0	0	6+1	3
24	FW	(Finland) FIN	Lauri Dalla Valle	2	0	0+0	0	0+0	0	0+0	0	0+2	0
25	FW	(England) ENG	Bobby Zamora	0	5	0	5	0	0	0	0	0	0
26	DF	(Czech Republic) CZE	Zdeněk Grygera	7	0	5+0	0	0+0	0	1+0	0	1+0	0
28	DF	(England) ENG	Matthew Briggs	14	1	1+1	0	0+0	0	1+0	0	10+1	1
29	MF	(Wales) WAL	Simon Davies	6	0	2+3	0	0+0	0	0+0	0	1+0	0
30	FW	(Belgium) BEL	Mousa Dembélé	43	2	32+3	2	1+0	0	0+1	0	4+2	0
31	MF	(Sweden) SWE	Alexander Kačaniklić	4	0	2+2	0	0+0	0	0+0	0	0+0	0
32	DF	(Algeria) ALG	Rafik Halliche	0	0	0+0	0	0+0	0	0+0	0	0+0	0
34	MF	(England) ENG	Tom Donegan	1	0	0+0	0	0+0	0	0+0	0	0+1	0
38	GK	(Philippines) PHI	Neil Etheridge	1	0	0+0	0	0+0	0	0+0	0	1+0	0
42	FW	(Italy) ITA	Marcello Trotta	2	0	0+1	0	0+1	0	0+0	0	0+0	0

=== Top scorers ===
Includes all competitive matches. The list is sorted by shirt number when total goals are equal.

Last updated on 5 May 2012

Position	Nation	Number	Name	Premier League	FA Cup	League Cup	Europa League	Total
1	(United States)	23	Clint Dempsey	17	3	0	3	23
2	(England)	8	Andy Johnson	3	0	0	8	11
3	(England)	25	Bobby Zamora	5	0	0	2	7
4	(England)	13	Danny Murphy	2	1	0	3	6
4	(Republic of Ireland)	16	Damien Duff	2	1	0	3	6
6	(Russia)	7	Pavel Pogrebnyak	6	0	0	0	6
7	(England)	4	Steve Sidwell	1	0	0	2	3
8	(Costa Rica)	11	Bryan Ruiz	2	0	0	0	2
8	(Belgium)	30	Mousa Dembélé	2	0	0	0	2
10	(Portugal)	9	Orlando Sá	1	0	0	0	1
10	(Northern Ireland)	18	Aaron Hughes	0	0	0	1	1
10	(Mali)	19	Mahamadou Diarra	1	0	0	0	1
10	(Switzerland)	21	Kerim Frei	0	0	0	1	1
10	(England)	28	Matthew Briggs	0	0	0	1	1
10	(Switzerland)	14	Philippe Senderos	1	0	0	0	1
/	/	/	Own Goals	5	0	0	0	5
/	/	/	TOTALS	48	5	0	24	76

=== Disciplinary record ===
Includes all competitive matches.

Last updated 5 May 2012

Number	Nation	Position	Name	Premier League		FA Cup		League Cup		Europa League		Total	
Number	Nation	Position	Name	Yellow card	Red card	Yellow card	Red card	Yellow card	Red card	Yellow card	Red card	Yellow card	Red card
6	(Northern Ireland)	DF	Chris Baird	6	0	1	0	0	0	1	0	8	0
13	(England)	MF	Danny Murphy	6	0	0	0	0	0	3	0	8	0
14	(Switzerland)	DF	Philippe Senderos	5	0	0	0	0	0	2	0	7	0
20	(Nigeria)	MF	Dickson Etuhu	4	0	0	0	0	0	3	0	7	0
4	(England)	MF	Steve Sidwell	4	0	0	0	0	0	2	0	6	0
30	(Belgium)	FW	Mousa Dembélé	6	0	0	0	0	0	0	1	6	1
4	(Norway)	DF	Brede Hangeland	6	0	0	0	0	0	0	0	6	0
8	(England)	FW	Andy Johnson	1	0	0	0	0	0	3	1	4	1
23	(United States)	MF	Clint Dempsey	2	0	1	0	0	0	1	0	4	0
25	(England)	FW	Bobby Zamora	2	0	0	0	0	0	2	0	4	0
16	(Republic of Ireland)	MF	Damien Duff	2	0	0	0	0	0	1	0	3	0
26	(Czech Republic)	DF	Zdeněk Grygera	2	0	0	0	0	0	1	0	3	0
3	(Norway)	DF	John Arne Riise	2	0	0	0	0	0	0	0	2	0
21	(Switzerland)	MF	Kerim Frei	0	0	0	0	1	0	1	0	2	0
1	(Australia)	GK	Mark Schwarzer	1	0	0	0	0	0	0	0	1	0
7	(Russia)	FW	Pavel Pogrebnyak	1	0	0	0	0	0	0	0	1	0
15	(Czech Republic)	MF	Marcel Gecov	0	0	0	0	0	0	1	0	1	0
28	(England)	DF	Matthew Briggs	0	0	0	0	0	0	1	0	1	0
			TOTALS	49	0	2	0	1	0	22	2	74	2

== Transfers ==
=== Players in ===
Date	Pos.	Name	From	Fee
1 July 2011	DF	(England) Dan Burn	(England) Darlington	Undisclosed
1 July 2011	MF	(England) Tom Donegan	(England) Everton	Undisclosed
8 July 2011	GK	(Hungary) Csaba Somogyi	(Hungary) Rákospalotai	Free
13 July 2011	DF	(Norway) John Arne Riise	(Italy) Roma	Undisclosed
20 July 2011	MF	(Czech Republic) Marcel Gecov	(Czech Republic) Slovan Liberec	Undisclosed
25 July 2011	MF	(Switzerland) Pajtim Kasami	(Italy) Palermo	Undisclosed
31 August 2011	DF	(Czech Republic) Zdeněk Grygera	(Italy) Juventus	Undisclosed
31 August 2011	FW	(Costa Rica) Bryan Ruiz	(Netherlands) Twente	£10.6 million
31 August 2011	FW	(Portugal) Orlando Sá	(Portugal) Porto	Free
31 January 2012	FW	(Russia) Pavel Pogrebnyak	(Germany) VfB Stuttgart	Undisclosed
31 January 2012	MF	(Australia) Ryan Williams	(England) Portsmouth	Undisclosed
16 February 2012	MF	(Mali) Mahamadou Diarra	Free Agent	

=== Players out ===
Date	Pos.	Name	To	Fee
1 July 2011	MF	(Hungary) Zoltán Gera	(England) West Bromwich Albion	Free
1 July 2011	FW	(United States) Eddie Johnson	(United States) Seattle Sounders	Free
1 July 2011	FW	(Senegal) Diomansy Kamara	(Turkey) Eskişehirspor	Free
1 July 2011	DF	(Ghana) John Pantsil	(England) Leicester City	Free
1 July 2011	MF	(England) Matthew Saunders		Free
1 July 2011	GK	(Switzerland) Pascal Zuberbühler		Retired
4 July 2011	MF	(South Africa) Kagisho Dikgacoi	(England) Crystal Palace	Undisclosed
18 July 2011	MF	(England) Jonathan Greening	(England) Nottingham Forest	Undisclosed
21 November 2011	MF	(England) Keanu Marsh-Brown		Released
31 January 2012	FW	(England) Bobby Zamora	(England) QPR	Undisclosed
7 March 2012	DF	(Mexico) Carlos Salcido	(Mexico) Tigres UANL	Undisclosed

=== Loans out ===
Date	Pos.	Name	To	Date Returned
24 July 2011	FW	(Netherlands) Danny Hoesen	(Netherlands) Fortuna Sittard	End of season
26 July 2011	GK	(England) David Stockdale	(England) Ipswich Town	End of season (recalled in December)
17 August 2011	DF	(Mexico) Carlos Salcido	(Mexico) Tigres UANL	End of season
24 August 2011	FW	(Finland) Lauri Dalla Valle	(Scotland) Dundee United	16 January 2012
30 August 2011	MF	(England) Keanu Marsh-Brown	(Scotland) Dundee United	January 2012
26 September 2011	MF	(Norway) Bjørn Helge Riise	(England) Portsmouth	17 November 2011
24 November 2011	FW	(Italy) Marcello Trotta	(England) Wycombe Wanderers	2 January 2012
