= Pat Laughlin =

Pat Laughlin may refer to:

- Pat Laughlin, comic fan who named the Fawcett Comics character Tawky Tawny
- Pat Laughlin, a character played by John Belushi in the TV movie Who Killed Atlanta's Children?

== See also ==
- Pat McLaughlin, singer and songwriter
- Pat McLaughlin (baseball) player
- Pat McLaughlin (footballer)
