= Charles Childs =

Charles Childs may refer to:

- Charles W. Childs (1844–1922), American educator and academic administrator
- Charles Bernard Childs (1895–1956), British physicist and mathematician
- Charlie Childs (died 1957), English jockey

== See also ==
- Charles Child (disambiguation)
