= Charles Child =

Charles Child may refer to:

- C. Judson Child Jr. (1923–2004), American bishop
- Charles Manning Child (1869–1954), American zoologist
- Charles the Child (c. 844–866), King of Aquitaine

== See also ==
- Charles Childs (disambiguation)
