= Brian Williamson (footballer) =

Australian rules footballer

Personal information
- Full name: Brian James Williamson
- Born: 9 December 1928
- Died: 20 December 2016 (aged 88)
- Height: 179 cm (5 ft 10 in)
- Weight: 74 kg (163 lb)

Playing career^{1}
Years	Club	Games (Goals)
1947	North Melbourne	1 (0)
- ^{1} Playing statistics correct to the end of 1947.

Brian James Williamson (9 December 1928 – 20 December 2016) was an Australian rules footballer who played with North Melbourne in the Victorian Football League (VFL).
