= Ibrahima Cissé =

Ibrahima Cissé may refer to:

- Ibrahima Cissé (footballer, born 1994), Guinean footballer
- Ibrahima Cissé (footballer, born 2001), Malian footballer
