= Bill Garvey =

English footballer

Personal information
- Date of birth: 1888
- Place of birth: London, England
- Height: 5 ft 7 in (1.70 m)
- Position: Left half

Senior career*
Years	Team	Apps	(Gls)
–1913	Metrogas		
1913–1914	Fulham	2	(0)
- Livesey United
- * Club domestic league appearances and goals

William G. Garvey was an English professional footballer who played as a left half in the Football League for Fulham.

== Personal life ==
Garvey served in the British Armed Forces during the First World War.

== Career statistics ==
Appearances and goals by club, season and competition
Club	Season	League			FA Cup		Total	
Club	Season	Division	Apps	Goals	Apps	Goals	Apps	Goals
Fulham	1913–14	Second Division	2	0	0	0	2	0
Career Total			2	0	0	0	2	0
