= Tommy Laws =

Scottish footballer

Personal information
- Full name: Thomas Laws
- Date of birth: 28 January 1890
- Place of birth: Summerston, Scotland
- Date of death: 1980 (aged 89–90)
- Position: Right half

Senior career*
Years	Team	Apps	(Gls)
- De Never Rubber Mills
- Summerstown
1913–1914	Fulham	6	(0)
1916–1918	Morton	5	(0)
1918–1919	Clyde	26	(0)
- * Club domestic league appearances and goals

Thomas Laws (28 January 1890 – 1980) was a Scottish professional footballer who played as a right half in the Scottish League for Clyde and Morton.

== Club career ==
He also played in the Football League for Fulham.

== Personal life ==
Laws served in the Cameronians (Scottish Rifles) during the First World War.

== Career statistics ==
Appearances and goals by club, season and competition
Club	Season	League			National cup (Note: Includes FA Cup)		Total	
Club	Season	Division	Apps	Goals	Apps	Goals	Apps	Goals
Fulham	1913–14	Second Division	6	0	0	0	6	0
Morton	1916–17	Scottish League	2	0	—		2	0
Morton	1917–18	Scottish League	3	0	—		3	0
Morton	Total		5	0	—		5	0
Clyde	1917–18	Scottish League	16	0	—		16	0
Clyde	1918–19	Scottish League	10	0	—		10	0
Clyde	Total		26	0	—		26	0
Career Total			31	0	0	0	31	0
