= Alan Pinkney =

English footballer

Personal information
- Date of birth: 1 January 1947 (age 79)
- Place of birth: Battersea, Greater London
- Position: Forward

Senior career*
Years	Team	Apps	(Gls)
1967–1969	Exeter City	7	(1)
1969–1974	Crystal Palace	24	(0)
1972–1973	→ Fulham (loan)	12	(0)
1974– ?	Wimbledon	6	(3)
	Cape Town City	?	(?)
- * Club domestic league appearances and goals

Alan J. Pinkney (born 1 January 1947 in Battersea, Greater London) is an English former professional footballer who played in the Football League, as a forward. He began his league career with Exeter City in 1967, making seven appearances scoring once, before signing for Crystal Palace in July 1969. Pinkney made 24 appearances for Palace over five seasons, without scoring and had a loan spell with Fulham in 1972–73 (12 appearances, no goals). He was released by Palace in 1974 and went on to play for Wimbledon and Cape Town City.
