= George Redwood =

English footballer

Personal information
- Full name: George Edward Redwood
- Date of birth: 4 June 1885
- Place of birth: Shoreditch, England
- Date of death: 24 November 1956 (aged 71)
- Place of death: Southend-on-Sea, England
- Position: Left back

Senior career*
Years	Team	Apps	(Gls)
- Tottenham St Louis
- Enfield
- Royal Fusiliers
1910–1911	Fulham	7	(0)
1911–1912	West Ham United	10	(0)
- * Club domestic league appearances and goals

George Edward Redwood (4 June 1885 – 24 November 1956) was an English professional footballer who played as a left back in the Football League for Fulham. He also played in the Southern League for West Ham United.

== Personal life ==
Redwood served as a lance corporal in the Royal Fusiliers during the First World War and suffered a wound that necessitated the amputation of one of his arms.

== Career statistics ==
Appearances and goals by club, season and competition
Club	Season	League			FA Cup		Total	
Club	Season	Division	Apps	Goals	Apps	Goals	Apps	Goals
West Ham United	1910–11	Southern League First Division	1	0	0	0	1	0
West Ham United	1911–12	Southern League First Division	9	0	3	0	12	0
Career total			10	0	3	0	13	0
