= Fred Waterson =

English footballer (1877–1918)

Personal information
- Full name: Frederick Waterson
- Date of birth: 1877
- Place of birth: Burton upon Trent, England
- Date of death: 12 October 1918 (aged 41)
- Place of death: near Hazebrouck, France
- Positions: Right half; centre forward

Senior career*
Years	Team	Apps	(Gls)
1896–1901	Burton Swifts	103	(2)
1901–1903	Burton United	62	(1)
1903–1909	Fulham	2	(0)
1909–1911	Doncaster Rovers	60	(0)
- * Club domestic league appearances and goals

Frederick Waterson (1877 – 12 October 1918) was an English professional footballer who made over 160 appearances in the Football League for Burton Swifts and Burton United as a right half. After his retirement as a player, he served Doncaster Rovers as reserve team trainer.

== Personal life ==
After his retirement from League football, Waterson worked at Doncaster Works. During the First World War he enlisted in the 1/5th King's Own (Yorkshire Light Infantry). He subsequently transferred to the 2/6th Durham Light Infantry and was serving as a corporal when he was wounded on the Western Front during the Hundred Days Offensive in October 1918. Waterson died of his wounds on 12 October 1918, at a Casualty Clearing Station near Hazebrouck, France. His death occurred just under a month before the Armistice. He was buried in La Kreule Military Cemetery, near Hazebrouck.

== Career statistics ==
Appearances and goals by club, season and competition
Club	Season	League			FA Cup		Total	
Club	Season	Division	Apps	Goals	Apps	Goals	Apps	Goals
Burton Swifts	1896–97	Second Division	6	0	0	0	6	0
Burton Swifts	1897–98	Second Division	27	1	1	0	28	1
Burton Swifts	1898–99	Second Division	13	1	0	0	13	1
Burton Swifts	1899–1900	Second Division	25	0	2	0	27	0
Burton Swifts	1900–01	Second Division	32	0	4	1	36	1
Burton Swifts	Total		103	2	7	1	110	3
Burton United	1901–02	Second Division	33	1	2	0	35	1
Burton United	1902–03	Second Division	29	0	4	0	33	0
Burton United	Total		62	1	6	0	68	1
Fulham	1907–08	Second Division	1	0	0	0	1	0
Fulham	1908–09	Second Division	1	0	0	0	1	0
Fulham	Total		2	0	0	0	2	0
Doncaster Rovers	1909–10	Midland League	33	0	0	0	36	0
Doncaster Rovers	1910–11	Midland League	27	0	0	0	32	0
Doncaster Rovers	Total		60	0	0	0	68	0
Career total			227	3	13	1	248	4
