= Bill Healey (footballer) =

English footballer (1926–2018)

Personal information
- Full name: William Richard Ernest Healey
- Date of birth: 22 May 1926
- Place of birth: Liverpool, England
- Date of death: November 2018 (aged 92)
- Place of death: Middlesbrough, England
- Position: Wing half

Senior career*
Years	Team	Apps	(Gls)
1949–1952	Arsenal	0	(0)
1952–1953	Fulham	1	(0)
1955–1956	Hartlepool United	6	(0)
Total		7	(0)
- * Club domestic league appearances and goals

William Richard Ernest Healey (22 May 1926 – November 2018) was an English footballer who played as a wing half for Fulham and Hartlepool United.
