= Rod Brathwaite =

English footballer

John Roderick Brathwaite (born 19 December 1965) was an English footballer who played for Fulham between 1984 and 1988. Born in Isleworth, Roderick was a striker who scored 2 goals in 13 appearances for the club. He also played for the England Schoolboys.
