= Reg Johnson (footballer, born 1904) =

English footballer (1904–1984)

Personal information
- Full name: Reginald Johnson
- Date of birth: 15 April 1904
- Place of birth: Quarry Bank, England
- Date of death: 1984 (aged 79–80)
- Position: Half-back

Senior career*
| Years | Team | Apps | (Gls) |
| 1923–1924 | Stourport Swifts | | |
| 1924–1926 | Cradley Heath | | |
| 1926–1928 | Fulham | 4 | (1) |
| 1929–1930 | Swindon Town | 10 | (0) |
| 1930–1935 | Cradley Heath | | |
| 1935 | Wednesbury St Paul's | | |
| Total | | 14 | (1) |
- * Club domestic league appearances and goals

Reginald Johnson (15 April 1904 – 1984) was an English footballer who played in the Football League for Fulham and Swindon Town.
