= Fred Whalley =

English footballer

Personal information
- Full name: Frederick Howard Whalley
- Date of birth: 9 October 1898
- Place of birth: Bolton, England
- Date of death: 25 April 1976 (aged 77)
- Place of death: Eccles, England
- Height: 6 ft 0 in (1.83 m)
- Position: Goalkeeper

Senior career*
Years	Team	Apps	(Gls)
1919–1920	Preston North End	8	(0)
1920–1921	Grimsby Town	23	(0)
1921–1924	Leeds United	87	(0)
1924–1926	Fulham	8	(0)
- * Club domestic league appearances and goals

Frederick Howard Whalley (8 October 1898 – 25 April 1976) was an English professional footballer who played in the Football League for Leeds United, Grimsby Town, Preston North End and Fulham as a goalkeeper.

== Personal life ==
Whalley enlisted as a reservist in the Loyal North Lancashire Regiment of the British Army in November 1913, whilst working as a cotton spinner. After Britain's declaration of war on Germany in August 1914, he was mobilised and arrived on the Western Front one month later. Whalley saw action through the winter operations of 1914–1915, but was court-martialed in January 1915 for falling asleep at his post. He was sentenced to one year's hard labour and owing to a case of trench foot, he was moved from Rouen to Britain. In November 1915, he returned to his battalion, but was reprimanded after going AWOL for three days. Whalley returned to the front in January 1916 and was again evacuated after another case of trench foot, before being transferred to the King's Regiment (Liverpool) and then to the Labour Corps in March 1917. He was discharged in December 1918, one month after the Armistice. After his retirement from football in the mid-1920s, Whalley became a policeman in Preston and later lived in Eccles.

== Career statistics ==
Appearances and goals by club, season and competition
Club	Season	League			FA Cup		Total	
Club	Season	Division	Apps	Goals	Apps	Goals	Apps	Goals
Preston North End	1919–20	First Division	8	0	0	0	8	0
Leeds United	1921–22	Second Division	38	0	1	0	39	0
Leeds United	1922–23	Second Division	42	0	3	0	45	0
Leeds United	1923–24	Second Division	7	0	0	0	0	0
Leeds United	Total		87	0	4	0	91	0
Fulham	1924–25	Second Division	8	0	0	0	8	0
Career total			103	0	4	0	107	0
