= Terry Parmenter =

English footballer

Personal information
- Full name: Terrence Leslie Parmenter
- Date of birth: October 21, 1947 (age 79)
- Place of birth: England

Senior career*
Years	Team	Apps	(Gls)
1964–1972	Fulham		
- Orient
- Gillingham
- * Club domestic league appearances and goals

Terrence Leslie Parmenter (born 21 October 1947) is an English former professional footballer. He played for Fulham, Orient and Gillingham between 1964 and 1972.
