= Sam Malpass =

English footballer (1918–1983)

Samuel Thomas Malpass (12 September 1918 – 1983) was a professional footballer. He played as a Defender for Huddersfield Town, Fulham, Watford and Great Yarmouth, and as a wartime guest for several Football League clubs.
