= Joe Bradshaw (footballer) =

English footballer (1884–?)

Personal information
- Date of birth: 1884
- Place of birth: Lancashire, England
- Position: Outside right

Youth career
- Woolwich Polytechnic

Senior career*
Years	Team	Apps	(Gls)
????–1904	Woolwich Arsenal	0	(0)
1904	West Norwood		
1904	Southampton	0	(0)
1904–1909	Fulham	3	(0)
1909–1910	Chelsea	8	(0)
1910–1911	Queens Park Rangers		
1911–1915	Southend United		

Managerial career
- 1912–1919: Southend United
- 1919–1926: Swansea Town
- 1926–1929: Fulham
- 1929–1932: Bristol City
- * Club domestic league appearances and goals

Joe Bradshaw (1884 – date unknown) was an English football player and manager.

== Playing career ==
As a player, he started out at Woolwich Polytechnic before turning professional at Woolwich Arsenal, where his father Harry Bradshaw, was manager; however he never made a first-team appearance. After his father left to manage Fulham in 1904, Bradshaw had brief spells at West Norwood and Southampton before rejoining his father at his new club; he played as an outside right for Fulham in a five-year spell that saw the club win the Southern League title twice and join the Football League in 1907. He then had stints at Chelsea, Queens Park Rangers and Southend United.

His brother, William, also played for Woolwich Arsenal and Fulham under their father.

== Coaching career ==
Bradshaw became player-manager of Southend United in 1912 (from a part-time basis only in 1913), winning promotion to the Southern League First Division, and seeing the club through World War I. In 1919 he moved to Swansea Town and spent seven years there, winning the Third Division South title in 1924–25, before being tempted by one of his former clubs; he moved back to Fulham, following in the footsteps of his father. His reign at Fulham was not auspicious - overseeing relegation to the Third Division South and failing to regain promotion. In 1929 he moved to Bristol City, whom he managed for three years.
