= Barry Friend =

English footballer

Personal information
- Date of birth: 13 October 1951 (age 75)
- Place of birth: Wandsworth, England
- Height: 5 ft 5 in (1.65 m)
- Positions: Winger; midfielder

Senior career*
| Years | Team | Apps | (Gls) |
| 1969–1970 | Fulham | 0 | (0) |
| 1970–1974 | Leatherhead | | |
| 1974–1976 | Fulham | 3 | (0) |
| 1976 | Ottawa Tigers | | |
| 1976 | Leatherhead | | |
| 1976–1977 | Wimbledon | | |
| 1977–1982 | Slough Town | 156 | (15) |
- Carshalton Athletic
| 1984–1985 | Tooting & Mitcham United | 8 | (0) |
- * Club domestic league appearances and goals

Barry Friend (born 13 October 1951) is an English former professional footballer who played in the Football League for Fulham. He also played non-league football in the London area for clubs including Leatherhead, Wimbledon, with whom he won the Southern League title in 1977, Slough Town, Carshalton Athletic and Tooting & Mitcham United. He played as a winger or midfielder. In the summer of 1976, he played abroad in Canada's National Soccer League with Ottawa Tigers.
