= Steve Greaves =

English footballer

Personal information
- Full name: Steven Ronald Greaves
- Date of birth: 17 January 1970 (age 56)
- Place of birth: Chelsea, England
- Position: Central defender

Youth career
- –1988: Fulham

Senior career*
Years	Team	Apps	(Gls)
1988–1990	Fulham	1	(0)
1988	→ Waterford United (loan)		
1989–1990	→ Brighton & Hove Albion (loan)	0	(0)
1990–1991	Preston North End	2	(0)
1991–1992	Ipswich Town	0	(0)
1992–1993	Scunthorpe United	15	(0)
- Dagenham & Redbridge
- Sudbury Town
- Bishop's Stortford
- Cambridge City
- * Club domestic league appearances and goals

Steven Ronald Greaves (born 17 January 1970 in Chelsea, London, England), is an English footballer who played as a central defender. He played in the Football League for Fulham, Brighton & Hove Albion, Preston North End, Ipswich Town and Scunthorpe United.
