= William Bradshaw (footballer) =

English footballer (1882–?)

Personal information
- Date of birth: 1882
- Place of birth: Burnley, England
- Date of death: ?
- Position: Outside right

Youth career
- Burnley Belvedere

Senior career*
Years	Team	Apps	(Gls)
1900–1904	Woolwich Arsenal	4	(2)
1904–1905	Fulham		
1905–1907	Burton United	64	(14)
1907–1908	Burnley	11	(1)
- Burnell's Ironworks
- Chester
- Ton Pentre
- * Club domestic league appearances and goals

William Bradshaw (1882–?) was an English professional footballer who played as an outside right for various clubs in the 1900s.

== Career ==
Bradshaw was born in Burnley and after playing for Burnley Belvedere, he joined Woolwich Arsenalof the Football League Second Division in 1900. He remained with the "Gunners" for four years, scoring two goals in four appearances. He then spent a season in the Southern League with Fulham before returning to the Second Division of the Football League with Burton United in 1905. In his two years at Burton, he made 64 league appearances, scoring 14 goals. The club finished in the penultimate place in the league table in 1906, and the following season in 1907 finished bottom. The club was then voted out of the Football League.

Bradshaw then joined his home-town club, Burnley for another season in the Second Division, before dropping out of league football, with spells at Burnell's Ironworks, Chester and Ton Pentre.

== Personal life ==
His father Harry and brother Joe were involved with Arsenal at some point in their careers, as manager and player respectively.
