= Mark Tucker (footballer) =

English footballer

Personal information
- Full name: Mark James Tucker
- Date of birth: 27 April 1972 (age 54)
- Place of birth: Woking, England
- Position: Right back

Senior career*
Years	Team	Apps	(Gls)
1991–1993	Fulham	4	(0)
1993–1996	Woking	103	(3)
1996–1997	Rushden & Diamonds	6	(0)
1997–2000	Kettering Town	?	(?)
1999	→ Wisbech Town (loan)	?	(?)
2000	→ Hayes (loan)	2	(0)
2000–2001	Worcester City	?	(?)
2001–2002	Bedford Town	?	(?)
- * Club domestic league appearances and goals

Mark James Tucker (born 27 April 1972) is an English former professional footballer who played in the Football League as a right back.

== Honours ==
Woking

- FA Trophy: 1993–94, 1994–95
