= Les Heard =

English footballer (1893–1970)

Personal information
- Full name: Leslie Henry Heard
- Date of birth: 25 May 1893
- Place of birth: Hendon, England
- Date of death: 1970 (aged 76–77)
- Position: Inside forward

Senior career*
Years	Team	Apps	(Gls)
1922–1923	Southall		
1923–1924	Fulham	19	(3)
Total		19	(3)
- * Club domestic league appearances and goals

Leslie Henry Heard (25 May 1893 – 1970) was an English footballer who played in the Football League for Fulham.
