= Dicky Boland =

English footballer

Personal information
- Full name: George Boland
- Date of birth: 6 October 1902
- Place of birth: Marley Hill, England
- Date of death: 1977 (aged 74–75)
- Position: Winger

Senior career*
Years	Team	Apps	(Gls)
1924–1925	White-le-Head Rangers		
1925–1928	Hartlepools United	64	(9)
1928–1929	Reading	1	(0)
1929–1930	Fulham	6	(0)
1931–1934	Gateshead	92	(16)
1934–1935	Crewe Alexandra	20	(2)
1936–1937	Walker Celtic		
1938	Ouston United		
Total		183	(27)
- * Club domestic league appearances and goals

George Boland (6 October 1902 – 1977) was an English footballer who played in the Football League for Crewe Alexandra, Fulham, Gateshead, Hartlepools United and Reading.
