= Harry Bradshaw (football manager) =

English football manager

Personal information
- Full name: Henry Bradshaw
- Date of birth: 1853
- Place of birth: Burnley, England
- Date of death: 28 September 1924 (aged 71)
- Place of death: Wandsworth, London, England

Managerial career
- Years: Team
- 1894–1899: Burnley
- 1899–1904: Woolwich Arsenal
- 1904–1909: Fulham

Henry Bradshaw (1853 – 28 September 1924) was an English football manager.

Although he was never a professional footballer himself, Bradshaw was a committee member of Burnley since 1887. In August 1894, he became Burnley's inaugural first team manager. In 1896–97, the team was relegated from the First Division after finishing bottom and losing the test matches, but they were promoted straight back up again the following season. Back in the top flight, Burnley finished third in 1898–99, the then best position in the club's history.

In the summer of 1899, Bradshaw moved south to Second Division Woolwich Arsenal, and achieved promotion with them as well. He signed several influential players including Archie Cross, Percy Sands, Jimmy Jackson and Jimmy Ashcroft for Arsenal, and brought in a Scottish style of play with short passing and fluid movement into position. After several seasons of near-misses, Arsenal finished second in 1903-04 and won promotion to the First Division, for the first time in the club's history. Eighteen of the twenty Arsenal players in the squad had been Bradshaw's signings.

However, he never oversaw Arsenal at the top, as he joined Southern League side Fulham in the summer of 1904, becoming the club's first professional manager. At Fulham, he won the Southern League title twice in succession, and won election to the Second Division at the end of 1906-07. In their first season at the top, Fulham finished fourth and reached the semi-finals of the FA Cup; however, they could not maintain their ascendance and only finished tenth the next season. Bradshaw continued to manage Fulham until his contract expired in 1909.

Bradshaw declined to continue as Fulham manager and instead went on to become secretary of the Southern League, a post he held until his retirement in 1921. He died in 1924. His sons, Joe Bradshaw and William Bradshaw, played for Arsenal and Fulham under him, and Joe went on to follow in his father's footsteps and was manager of Fulham between 1926 and 1929.
