= Tommy Brown (footballer, born 1906) =

English footballer

Personal information
- Full name: Thomas Frank Brown
- Date of birth: q3 1906
- Place of birth: Sunderland, County Durham, England
- Height: 5 ft 9 in (1.75 m)
- Position: Full back

Senior career*
Years	Team	Apps	(Gls)
- Percy Main Amateurs
–1925	Crook Town		
1925–1926	Newcastle United	0	(0)
1926–1927	Fulham	11	(0)
1927–1928	Charlton Athletic	0	(0)
1928–1929	York City	41	(0)
Total		52	(0)
- * Club domestic league appearances and goals

Thomas Frank Brown (1906 – after 1928) was an English professional footballer who played as a full back in the Football League for Fulham and in non-League football for Percy Main Amateurs, Crook Town and York City.
