= Charlie Devan =

Scottish footballer

Personal information
- Date of birth: 22 April 1901
- Place of birth: Girvan, Scotland
- Date of death: 1980 (aged 78–79)
- Height: 5 ft 8 in (1.73 m)
- Position: Outside left

Senior career*
Years	Team	Apps	(Gls)
1921–1922	Ashfield		
1922–1923	St Anthony's		
1923	Clydebank	10	(0)
1923–1924	Morton	8	(1)
1924–1925	South Shields	12	(0)
1925–1927	Grimsby Town	50	(13)
1927–1928	Fulham	7	(2)
- * Club domestic league appearances and goals

Charles F. Devan (22 April 1901 – 1980) was a Scottish professional footballer, who played as an outside left.
