= Tommy Cronin (footballer) =

English footballer

Personal information
- Full name: Thomas Patrick Cronin
- Date of birth: 17 December 1932 (age 93)
- Place of birth: Richmond, London, England
- Position: Inside forward

Senior career*
Years	Team	Apps	(Gls)
1953–1955	Fulham	2	(0)
1956	Reading	30	(4)
Total		32	(4)
- * Club domestic league appearances and goals

Thomas Patrick Cronin (born 17 December 1932) is an English former professional footballer who played as an inside forward for Fulham and Reading.
