= Pat McLaughlin (footballer) =

English footballer

Personal information
- Full name: Patrick McLaughlin
- Date of birth: 1883
- Place of birth: Jarrow, England
- Date of death: 27 March 1916 (aged 32–33)
- Place of death: Sint-Elooi, Belgium
- Position: Centre forward

Senior career*
Years	Team	Apps	(Gls)
- Blaydon United
- Hebburn Argyle
- Chorley
- Hebburn Argyle
- Blyth Spartans
- South Shields Adelaide
1909	Fulham	2	(1)
- Wallsend Park Villa
- Southend United
- Jarrow Caledonians
- Scotswood
- * Club domestic league appearances and goals

Patrick McLaughlin (1883 – 27 March 1916) was an English professional footballer who played as a centre forward in the Football League for Fulham. He had a long career in non-League football in North East England.

== Personal life ==
Prior to the First World War, McLaughlin worked as commissionaire at Palmer's Works in Jarrow. In August 1914, shortly after the outbreak of the First World War, McLaughlin enlisted in the Northumberland Fusiliers in Jarrow. By the end of the month, he had been promoted to acting sergeant and was posted to the Western Front in December 1914. McLaughlin was made a permanent sergeant in March 1915 and was wounded in July 1915. He was promoted to company sergeant major in February 1916. McLaughlin was killed by a sniper shortly after his unit had taken a German trench near Sint-Elooi, Belgium on the morning of 27 March 1916. He is commemorated on the Menin Gate.

== Career statistics ==
Appearances and goals by club, season and competition
Club	Season	League			FA Cup		Total	
Club	Season	Division	Apps	Goals	Apps	Goals	Apps	Goals
Fulham	1909–10	Second Division	2	1	0	0	2	1
Career total			2	1	0	0	2	1
