= Charles Bernard Childs =

British physicist and mathematician

Charles Bernard Childs FRSE (23 June 1895 – 4 July 1956) was a British physicist and mathematician. He was founder and chairman of the Scottish Community Drama Association. He was also Chairman of the British Universities Film Council.

== Life ==
He was born in Wandsworth in London on 23 June 1895, the son of Emily G. and Charles Alfred Childs, a commercial clerk, both originally from Kingston, Surrey. In 1911, records show Childs studied at The College, Hadham Road, Bishop's Stortford.

He graduated from the University of Birmingham in 1920 with a BSc and remained at the university for a while after in order to start research for a doctorate in natural philosophy. This was awarded in 1922 for his thesis entitled, "The thermomagnetic properties of carbon steels at temperatures round the Curie point". Afterwards, he obtained a post lecturing at the University of Edinburgh in 1922, where he was appointed assistant lecturer in natural philosophy. In 1924, he was promoted to lecturer. Shortly after arriving at Edinburgh, he joined the Edinburgh Mathematical Society in March 1923. In 1951, he was appointed as a senior lecturer, and remained in the role until his death five years later.

In the Second World War he worked under J.A. Ratcliffe on ionospheric research at the University of Cambridge.

He was elected a Fellow of the Royal Society of Edinburgh on 5 March 1956, his main proposers being Norman Feather, Robert Schlapp, James Paton and Thomas R Bolam. He grew ill shortly afterwards and was moved to an Edinburgh nursing home.

He died in Edinburgh on 4 July 1956.
