= Ernie Bowering =

English footballer

Personal information
- Full name: Ernest George Bowering
- Date of birth: 30 March 1891
- Place of birth: Wandsworth, England
- Date of death: 23 November 1961 (aged 70)
- Place of death: Tonbridge, England
- Height: 5 ft 10 in (1.78 m)
- Position: Left half

Youth career
- Tottenham Thursday

Senior career*
Years	Team	Apps	(Gls)
1912	Tottenham Hotspur	7	(0)
1912	Fulham	1	(0)
- Merthyr Town
- * Club domestic league appearances and goals

Ernest George Bowering (30 March 1891 – 23 November 1961) was a professional footballer who played for Tottenham Hotspur, Fulham and Merthyr Town.

== Career ==
After playing for the youth side Tottenham Thursday, Bowering joined Tottenham Hotspur where the left half appeared in seven matches in the second half of the 1911–12 season. He went on to sign for Fulham in October 1912, where he played one match before ending his career at Merthyr Town.

== Personal life ==
Bowering served in the Royal Navy, the Royal Naval Air Service and the Royal Air Force during the First World War. He finished the war with the rank of Corporal Mechanic.
