= William Maughan (footballer) =

English footballer (1894–1916)

Personal information
- Full name: William Henry Maughan
- Date of birth: July 1894
- Place of birth: West Stanley, England
- Date of death: 2 October 1916 (aged 22)
- Place of death: Dernancourt, France
- Position: Right half

Senior career*
Years	Team	Apps	(Gls)
- West Stanley
- Easington Colliery Welfare
1913–1916	Fulham	22	(1)
- * Club domestic league appearances and goals

William Henry Maughan (July 1894 – 2 October 1916) was an English professional footballer who played as a right half in the Football League for Fulham.

== Personal life ==
Maughan enlisted in the Durham Light Infantry in 1915, during the First World War and achieved the rank of corporal. He was wounded in action during the opening phase of the Battle of Le Transloy and died of wounds at a Casualty Clearing Station in Dernancourt, France on 2 October 1916. Maughan was buried in Dernancourt Communal Cemetery Extension.

== Career statistics ==
Appearances and goals by club, season and competition
Club	Season	League			FA Cup		Total	
Club	Season	Division	Apps	Goals	Apps	Goals	Apps	Goals
Fulham	1913–14	Second Division	1	0	0	0	1	0
Fulham	1914–15	Second Division	21	1	2	0	23	1
Career total			22	1	2	0	24	1
