= Sam Henderson (footballer) =

English footballer (1901-1980)

Personal information
- Full name: Samuel Joplin Henderson
- Date of birth: 3 November 1901
- Place of birth: Willington Quay, England
- Date of death: 1980 (aged 78–79)
- Position: Wing-half

Senior career*
Years	Team	Apps	(Gls)
1921–1925	Willington Quay		
1925–1928	South Shields	14	(1)
1928–1929	Chelsea	0	(0)
1929–1930	Fulham	18	(0)
1930–1931	Tunbridge Wells Rangers		
1931	North Shields		
Total		188	(9)
- * Club domestic league appearances and goals

Samuel Joplin Henderson (3 November 1901 – 1980) was an English footballer who played in the Football League for Fulham and South Shields.
