= John Houghton (English footballer) =

English footballer (1882–1985)

Personal information
- Full name: John Houghton
- Date of birth: 14 September 1891
- Place of birth: Prescot, England
- Date of death: 14 January 1991 (aged 99)
- Place of death: La Mesa, California, United States
- Height: 5 ft 8 1/2 in (1.74 m)
- Positions: Left back; centre half

Senior career*
Years	Team	Apps	(Gls)
- Prescot
- St Helens Town
- Norwich City
1919	Fulham	2	(0)
1921–1922	Wigan Borough	29	(0)
- Mistletoe Lodge
- Canadian Club
- * Club domestic league appearances and goals

John Houghton (14 September 1891 – 14 January 1991), sometimes known as Jack Houghton, was an English professional footballer who played in the Football League for Fulham and Wigan Borough as a left back and centre half.

== Personal life ==
Houghton emigrated to the United States with his family and lived in Chicago, Montreal and Niagara Falls. He died in La Mesa, California on 14 January 1991, at the age of 99.

== Career statistics ==
Appearances and goals by club, season and competition
Club	Season	League			FA Cup		Other		Total	
Club	Season	Division	Apps	Goals	Apps	Goals	Apps	Goals	Apps	Goals
Fulham	1919–20	Second Division	2	0	0	0	―		2	0
Wigan Borough	1921–22	Third Division North	29	0	0	0	3 (Note: Appearances in Lancashire Senior Cup)	0	32	0
Career total			31	0	0	0	3	0	34	0
