= 1907–08 Crystal Palace F.C. season =

English football club season

Crystal Palace
1907–08 season
- Chairman: Sydney Bourne
- Manager: Edmund Goodman
- Southern Football League Division One: 4th
- FA Cup: Third round
- Top goalscorer: League: George Woodger 13; All: George Woodger 15
- Highest home attendance: 14,000 (vs. Norwich City, 20 April)
- Lowest home attendance: 4,000 (vs. Luton Town, 4 March)
- Average home league attendance: 8,710

The 1907–08 season was one of change for the new club. John Robson departed the club to manage Brighton and Hove Albion, and club secretary Edmund Goodman stepped in to take over the role. Goodman's first problem was to find a replacement for goalkeeper Bob Hewitson. Hewitson had departed for Oldham, and his early replacement was William Hall of Manchester City. Hall played in the first ten games before losing his place to Josh Johnson, signed from Plymouth Argyle. Johnson swiftly established himself as first choice and would go on to play 295 times for the first team. Dick Harker left for Hibernian and Charlie Wallace was snapped up by Aston Villa, where he would go on to win both the Football League and the FA Cup. Horace Astley, hero of last season's FA Cup exploits, moved on to Heywood United, and Bill Ledger moved on to Sunderland.

Although Goodman brought players into the club, the squad of players used dropped from last season's 26 to 22. George Walker returned to the club from New Brompton, and forward Jimmy Bauchop was signed from Norwich City. John Brearley came to the club from Tottenham and Billy Davies joined from Stoke City. Davies would become Palace's first International, playing for Wales in their match against Scotland on 7 March 1908. George Woodger was called into the England squad as a reserve for the 4 April 1908 game against Scotland but did not make the first team. Forwards Isaac Owens and George Smith also played for Palace during this season, joining from Bristol Rovers and Bristol City respectively.

== Southern Football League First Division ==
Date	Opponents	H / A	Result F – A	Scorers	Attendance
4 September 1907	Northampton Town	H	0 – 2		5,000
7 September	Southampton	A	3 – 2	Davies, Woodger, Edwards (pen)	5,000
14 September 1907	Plymouth Argyle	H	0 – 4		8,000
28 September	Queen's Park Rangers	H	2 – 3	Roberts (2)	8,000
5 October 1907	Tottenham Hotspur	A	2 – 1	Innerd, Needham	17,000
7 October 1907	Northampton Town	A	1 – 1	Innerd	
12 October 1907	Swindon Town	H	4 – 1	Woodger (3), Owens	8,000
19 October 1907	New Brompton	H	3 – 3	Owens, Davies, Woodger	8,000
26 October 1907	Luton Town	A	0 – 4		6,000
2 November 1907	Brighton & Hove Albion	H	2 – 1	Owens, Innerd	10,000
9 November	Portsmouth	A	1 – 0	Swann	8,000
16 November	Bradford (Park Avenue)	H	1 – 1	Roberts (pen)	11,000
23 November 1907	Millwall	A	0 – 1		5,000
30 November 1907	Brentford	H	2 – 1	Roberts, Woodger	7,000
7 December 1907	Bristol Rovers	A	1 – 2	Roberts	7,000
14 December 1907	Leyton	H	3 – 0	Swann (2), Owens	6,000
21 December 1907	Reading	A	1 – 2	Brearley	5,000
25 December 1907	Norwich City	A	1 – 0	Brearley	13,500
28 December 1907	Watford	H	3 – 1	Roberts (pen), Woodger (2)	7,000
4 January 1908	Southampton	H	1 – 0	Roberts (pen)	8,000
18 January 1908	West Ham United	H	1 – 3	Woodger	10,000
25 January 1908	Queen's Park Rangers	A	2 – 1	Smith, Swann	8,000
8 February 1908	Swindon Town	A	0 – 0		7,000
12 February 1908	Tottenham Hotspur	H	0 – 2		8,000
15 February 1908	New Brompton	A	2 – 2	Smith, Woodger	2,000
29 February 1908	Brighton & Hove Albion	A	1 – 0	Owens	4,000
4 March 1908	Luton Town	H	4 – 2	Needham, Owens (2), Davies	4,000
7 March 1908	Portsmouth	H	2 – 2	Woodger, Ryan	10,000
14 March 1908	Bradford (Park Avenue)	A	1 – 0	Owens	8,000
21 March 1908	Millwall	H	2 – 0	Needham, Bauchop	13,500
28 March 1908	Brentford	A	1 – 1	Bauchop	9,000
4 April 1908	Bristol Rovers	H	1 – 1	Woodger	10,000
8 April 1908	Plymouth Argyle	A	1 – 1	Bauchop	7,000
11 April 1908	Leyton	A	0 – 0		5,000
18 April 1908	Reading	H	2 – 0	Bauchop, Woodger	10,000
20 April 1908	Norwich City	H	2 – 1	Needham, Bauchop	14,000
25 April 1908	Watford	A	1 – 4	Bauchop	3,000

Pos	Team	Pld	W	D	L	GF	GA	GR	Pts
2	Plymouth Argyle	38	19	11	8	50	31	1.613	49
3	Millwall	38	19	8	11	49	32	1.531	46
4	Crystal Palace	38	17	10	11	54	51	1.059	44
5	Swindon Town	38	16	10	12	55	40	1.375	42
6	Bristol Rovers	38	16	10	12	59	56	1.054	42

Rules for classification: The system of using goal average to separate two teams tied on points was used until the 1976-77 season. The points system: 2 points for a win, 1 point for a draw and 0 points for losing.

== FA Cup ==
After a good run in the FA Cup last season, Palace were this time allowed to enter the draw in the first round proper. They were eventually dispatched by Grimsby Town in the third round, having been drawn away from home in each tie. Had they managed to beat Grimsby, a rematch with Newcastle would have been the reward.

Date	Round	Opponents	H / A	Result F – A	Scorers	Attendance
11 January 2908	First Round	Coventry City	A	4 – 2	Roberts, Woodger (2), Davies	9,992
1 February 1908	Second Round	Plymouth Argyle	A	3 – 2	Roberts, Smith, Swann	17,830
22 February 1908	Third Round	Grimsby Town	A	0 – 1		8,828

== Squad statistics ==
Pos.	Name	League		FA Cup		Total	
Pos.	Name	Apps	Goals	Apps	Goals	Apps	Goals
GK	(England) William Hall	10	0	0	0	10	0
GK	(England) Henry Balding	5	0	0	0	5	0
GK	(England) Joshua Johnson	23	0	3	0	26	0
FB	(England) Matthew Edwards	11	1	0	0	11	1
FB	(England) Harry Collyer	21	0	2	0	23	0
FB	(England) George Walker	34	0	3	0	37	0
HB	(England) Wilf Innerd (c)	34	3	3	0	37	3
HB	(England) Charles Ryan	28	1	2	0	30	1
HB	(England) Bill Forster	20	0	3	0	23	0
HB	(England) Arthur Wilson	1	0	0	0	1	0
HB	(England) Fred Lewis	3	0	0	0	3	0
HB	(England) John Brearley	31	2	3	0	34	2
FW	(Wales) Billy Davies	31	3	3	1	34	4
FW	George Smith	9	2	2	1	11	3
FW	(England) George Woodger	35	13	3	2	38	15
FW	(England) Archie Needham	30	4	1	0	31	4
FW	(England) Dick Roberts	20	7	2	2	22	9
FW	(England) Robert Baker	4	0	0	0	4	0
FW	(Scotland) James Bauchop	8	6	0	0	8	6
FW	(England) H. Higgins	1	0	0	0	1	0
FW	(England) Herbert Swann	37	4	3	1	40	5
FW	(England) Isaac Owens	22	8	0	0	22	8
