= 1908–09 Crystal Palace F.C. season =

English football club season

Crystal Palace
1908–09 season
- Chairman: Sydney Bourne
- Manager: Edmund Goodman
- Southern Football League Division One: 16th
- FA Cup: Second round
- Top goalscorer: League: Jimmy Bauchop 17; All: Jimmy Bauchop 20
- Highest home attendance: 17,076 (vs. Burnley, 6 February, FA Cup)
- Lowest home attendance: 1,500 (vs. Exeter City, 6 March)
- Average home league attendance: 7,519

The 1908–09 season saw Palace fail to reach the heights of the previous season. They had finished fourth in 1907-08, but this season would see them end up in 16th place. The squad underwent changes once again, with Matthew Edwards moving from Palace to Doncaster Rovers, Bill Forster moving to Grimsby Town, Billy Davies moving to West Bromwich Albion, Dick Roberts to Worcester City and Isaac Owens to Bath City.

Edward Collins came into the club from Carlisle United as a full back. James Thorpe, a half back, joined from Leeds City, while forward George Garratt joined from West Bromwich Albion. Adam Haywood joined as a player-coach, playing in a forward role, mainly as an inside right. Charles McGibbon, a centre forward, came from New Brompton and Bill Lawrence returned for a second spell at the club. Jimmy Bauchop not only finished the season top-scorer, he also started it off by becoming the first player to be sent off in a Palace shirt, on 9 September 1908 in a London Challenge Cup tie against Croydon Common.

== Southern Football League First Division ==
| Date | Opponents | H / A | Result F – A | Scorers | Attendance |
|---|---|---|---|---|---|
| 1 September 1908 | Coventry City | A | 1 – 1 | Bauchop | 5,000 |
| 5 September 1908 | Leyton | H | 5 – 1 | Bauchop 2, Swann, Woodger, unknown | 10,000 |
| 12 September 1908 | West Ham United | A | 1 – 0 | Woodger | 10,000 |
| 16 September 1908 | Southampton | H | 2 – 3 | Swann, Bauchop | |
| 19 September 1908 | Brighton & Hove Albion | H | 4 – 0 | McGibbon 3, Bauchop | 10,000 |
| 26 September 1908 | Plymouth Argyle | A | 0 – 0 | | 8,000 |
| 30 September 1908 | Norwich City | H | 4 – 0 | Woodger, Haywood, McGibbon, Lawrence | 5,000 |
| 3 October 1908 | Brentford | A | 3 – 1 | Haywood, Barker, McGibbon | 6,000 |
| 5 October 1908 | Southampton | A | 4 – 4 | McGibbon 3, Lawrence | 5,000 |
| 10 October 1908 | Luton Town | H | 2 – 0 | McGibbon, Woodger | 10,000 |
| 15 October 1908 | Norwich City | A | 0 – 2 | | 5,000 |
| 17 October 1908 | Swindon Town | A | 0 – 4 | | 7,000 |
| 21 October 1908 | Queen's Park Rangers | H | 3 – 0 | Garratt, Lawrence 2 | 6,000 |
| 24 October 1908 | Portsmouth | H | 3 – 2 | Bauchop 3 | 9,500 |
| 31 October 1908 | Exeter City | A | 1 – 1 | McGibbon | 7,000 |
| 7 November 1908 | Northampton Town | H | 2 – 3 | Swann 2 | 12,000 |
| 14 November 1908 | New Brompton | A | 1 – 2 | McGibbon | 4,000 |
| 21 November 1908 | Millwall | H | 2 – 1 | Swann, Bauchop | 10,000 |
| 28 November 1908 | Southend United | A | 0 – 1 | | 6,000 |
| 12 December 1908 | Bristol Rovers | A | 2 – 2 | Ryan, Bauchop | 6,000 |
| 19 December 1908 | Watford | H | 3 – 1 | McGibbon 2, Swann | 8,000 |
| 26 December 1908 | Reading | A | 2 – 2 | Woodger | 11,000 |
| 2 January 1909 | Leyton | A | 0 – 2 | | 4,000 |
| 9 January 1909 | West Ham United | H | 2 – 2 | Bauchop, Woodger | 6,000 |
| 23 January 1909 | Brighton & Hove Albion | A | 3 – 0 | | 5,000 |
| 30 January 1909 | Plymouth Argyle | H | 0 – 1 | | 6,000 |
| 13 February 1909 | Luton Town | A | 1 – 4 | Bauchop | 5,000 |
| 20 February 1909 | Swindon Town | H | 1 – 1 | Swann | 7,000 |
| 27 February 1909 | Portsmouth | A | 1 – 1 | Bauchop | 5,000 |
| 6 March 1909 | Exeter City | H | 0 – 0 | | 1,500 |
| 13 March 1909 | Northampton Town | A | 0 – 1 | | 7,000 |
| 17 March 1909 | Southend United | H | 1 – 3 | Brearley | |
| 20 March 1909 | New Brompton | H | 1 – 2 | Bauchop | 4,000 |
| 27 March 1909 | Millwall | | 1 – 2 | Swann | 5,000 |
| 31 March 1909 | Brentford | H | 3 – 1 | Woodger 2, Bauchop | 2,000 |
| 3 April 1909 | Queen's Park Rangers | A | 1 – 1 | Swann | 5,000 |
| 10 April 1909 | Coventry City | H | 0 – 1 | | 5,000 |
| 12 April 1909 | Reading | H | 0 – 0 | | 5,000 |
| 17 April 1909 | Bristol Rovers | H | 4 – 1 | Lee 2, Swann, Bauchop | 4,000 |
| 24 April 1909 | Watford | A | 1 – 5 | Bauchop | 4,000 |

| Pos | Team | Pld | W | D | L | GF | GA | GR | Pts |
|---|---|---|---|---|---|---|---|---|---|
| 14 | Watford | 40 | 14 | 9 | 17 | 51 | 64 | 0.797 | 37 |
| 15 | Queens Park Rangers | 40 | 12 | 12 | 16 | 52 | 50 | 1.040 | 36 |
| 16 | Crystal Palace | 40 | 12 | 12 | 16 | 62 | 62 | 1.000 | 36 |
| 17 | West Ham United | 40 | 16 | 4 | 20 | 56 | 60 | 0.933 | 36 |
| 18 | Brighton & Hove Albion | 40 | 14 | 7 | 19 | 60 | 61 | 0.984 | 35 |

Rules for classification: The system of using goal average to separate two teams tied on points was used until the 1976-77 season. The points system: 2 points for a win, 1 point for a draw and 0 points for losing.

== FA Cup ==
Palace again entered the draw in the first round proper. They were drawn away to the winners of the previous season, Wolverhampton Wanderers. Bauchop, formerly of Celtic, secured a draw with two goals for Palace. In the replay, Wolves took the lead with barely a minute gone, before Palace equalised through Lawrence within 15 minutes. Bauchop then thought he had put Palace ahead, but was in an off-side position. Palace lost Ryan to an injury shortly before half-time and battled on with ten men, before Ryan re-entered the fray to help see them to the half-time whistle. Collins eventually put Palace ahead but they failed to hold onto the lead and a resurgent Wolves equalised with 8 minutes to play. The tie went to extra time, and Bauchop scored a third with Needham, covering at full back, putting the tie beyond Wolves in the final minute. The goal was recalled nearly forty years later by a letter writer to the Croydon Advertiser: "Needham playing at left back tackled and robbed a Wolves forward - a clever piece of play. Instead of passing the ball up field, he simply weaved his way through all the players and dribbled it right up to the Wolves' goal, putting in an unstoppable shot." In the second round they drew Burnley, drawing at home and losing the replay 9–0 in. The defeat remains the club's heaviest loss in the FA Cup.

| Date | Round | Opponents | H / A | Result F – A | Scorers | Attendance |
|---|---|---|---|---|---|---|
| 16 January 1909 | First Round | Wolverhampton Wanderers | A | 2 – 2 | Bauchop 2 | 18,653 |
| 21 January 1909 | First Round Replay | Wolverhampton Wanderers | H | 4 – 2 | Lawrence, Garratt, Bauchop, Needham | 12,300 |
| 6 February 1909 | Second Round | Burnley | H | 0 – 0 | | 17,066 |
| 10 February 1909 | Second Round Replay | Burnley | A | 0 – 9 | | 12,000 |

== Squad statistics ==
| Pos. | Name | League | | FA Cup | | Total | |
| Pos. | Name | Apps | Goals | Apps | Goals | Apps | Goals |
|---|---|---|---|---|---|---|---|
| GK | (England) Henry Balding | 2 | 0 | 0 | 0 | 2 | 0 |
| GK | (England) Joshua Johnson | 38 | 0 | 4 | 0 | 42 | 0 |
| FB | (England) Harry Collyer | 27 | 0 | 4 | 0 | 31 | 0 |
| FB | (England) George Walker | 8 | 0 | 0 | 0 | 8 | 0 |
| FB | (England) Edward Collins | 24 | 0 | 3 | 0 | 27 | 0 |
| HB | (England) Wilf Innerd (c) | 24 | 0 | 4 | 0 | 28 | 0 |
| HB | (England) Charles Ryan | 28 | 1 | 4 | 0 | 32 | 1 |
| HB | (England) Fred Lewis | 13 | 0 | 1 | 0 | 14 | 0 |
| HB | (England) John Brearley | 39 | 1 | 4 | 0 | 40 | 1 |
| HB | James Thorpe | 17 | 0 | 0 | 0 | 17 | 0 |
| HB | (England) James Hullock | 5 | 0 | 0 | 0 | 5 | 0 |
| HB | Arthur Wilson | 1 | 0 | 0 | 0 | 1 | 0 |
| FW | (England) George Garratt | 33 | 1 | 4 | 1 | 37 | 2 |
| FW | (England) George Woodger | 37 | 9 | 4 | 0 | 41 | 9 |
| FW | (England) Archie Needham | 24 | 0 | 4 | 1 | 28 | 1 |
| FW | (England) Dick Roberts | 2 | 0 | 0 | 0 | 2 | 0 |
| FW | (Scotland) James Bauchop | 35 | 17 | 4 | 3 | 39 | 20 |
| FW | (England) H. Higgins | 1 | 0 | 0 | 0 | 1 | 0 |
| FW | (England) Herbert Swann | 25 | 11 | 0 | 0 | 25 | 11 |
| FW | Jack Kyle | 3 | 0 | 0 | 0 | 3 | 0 |
| FW | (England) Adam Haywood | 9 | 2 | 0 | 0 | 9 | 2 |
| FW | (England) Charles McGibbon | 17 | 13 | 0 | 0 | 17 | 13 |
| FW | H. Barker | 6 | 1 | 0 | 0 | 6 | 1 |
| FW | Bill Lawrence | 16 | 4 | 4 | 1 | 20 | 5 |
| FW | Frank Lee | 6 | 2 | 0 | 0 | 6 | 2 |
