= 1906–07 Crystal Palace F.C. season =

English football club season

Crystal Palace
1906–07 season
- Chairman: Sydney Bourne
- Manager: John Robson
- Southern Football League Division One: 19th
- FA Cup: Fourth round
- Top goalscorer: League: Horace Astley 10; All: Horace Astley 12
- Highest home attendance: 35,000 (vs. Everton, 9 March, FA Cup)
- Lowest home attendance: 2,000 (vs. Bristol Rovers, 17 April)
- Average home league attendance: 9,437

Crystal Palace started their second season in a new division, having gained promotion from the Southern League Division Two the previous season. There were a number of personnel changes this season, with Archie Grant and captain Ted Birnie moving to Chelsea and George Walker going to New Brompton. Palace's hat-trick hero in their FA Cup exploits of last season, Walter Watkins, also moved on to Northampton Town. In their places Palace brought in a number of new faces. Charles Ryan joined from Nunhead, Thomas Wills from Newcastle, Bill Forster from Sheffield United and Bill Ledger from Pryhope Villa. Wilf Innerd was made captain and played in all but one of the club's League and Cup matches. The club struggled to find their feet on the new division, and failed to score in 13 of their matches, finishing the season in 19th position, one place off the bottom. This was enough to ensure safety though, as for this season there was no relegation. Palace again called on a number of amateurs from the local area and beyond, including Henry Littlewort. Littlewort, who made his only appearance for the club this season, would go on to win a gold medal with the British Football team in the 1912 Olympics.

== Southern Football League First Division ==
Date	Opponents	H / A	Result F–A	Scorers	Attendance
1 September 1906	Northampton Town	H	3–0	Woodger (2), Harker	7,000
8 September 1906	Queen's Park Rangers	A	0–1		7,900
15 September 1906	Fulham	A	0–3		7,900
19 September 1906	Reading	H	4–1	Harker, Roberts, Woodger, Hodgkinson	4,000
22 September 1906	Southampton	A	1–1	Edwards (pen)	4,500
29 September 1906	West Ham United	H	1–1	Wallace	10,000
6 October 1906	Tottenham Hotspur	A	0–3		18,000
13 October 1906	Swindon Town	H	3–2	Wallace (3)	5,000
20 October 1906	Norwich City	A	2–4	Edwards (pen.), Wallace	5,000
27 October 1906	Luton Town	H	0–1		8,000
3 November 1906	Bristol Rovers	A	1–1	Wallace	5,000
10 November 1906	Brentford	A	0–2		6,000
17 November 1906	Millwall	H	3–0	Roberts, Wallace, Innerd	6,000
24 November 1906	Leyton	A	4–0	Astley (2), Wallace, Harker	
1 December 1906	Portsmouth	H	1–0	Woodger	7,500
15 December 1906	Plymouth Argyle	H	0–2		6,000
22 December 1906	Brighton & Hove Albion	A	1–2	Wallace	5,000
26 December 1906	Watford	A	0–2		3,000
29 December 1906	Northampton Town	A	1–2	Roberts	3,000
5 January 1907	Queen's Park Rangers	H	5–1	Astley (4), Harker	15,000
19 January 1907	Fulham	A	1–2	Astley	6,500
26 January 1907	Southampton	H	1–1	Roberts	6,500
9 February 1907	Tottenham Hotspur	H	0–1		8,000
16 February 1907	Swindon Town	A	1–2	Astley	5,000
2 March 1907	Luton Town	A	1–2	Astley	8,000
16 March 1907	Brentford	H	0–3		7,000
23 March 1907	Millwall	A	0–2		10,000
25 March 1907	West Ham United	A	1–1	Harker	3,000
29 March 1907	Reading	A	1–1	Weston	10,000
30 March 1907	Leyton	H	1–0	Woodger	7,000
1 April 1907	Watford	H	1–3	Roberts (pen.)	10,000
6 April 1907	Portsmouth	A	0–6		7,000
13 April 1907	New Brompton	H	1–3	Edwards (pen.)	5,500
17 April 1907	Bristol Rovers	H	3–3	Astley, Roberts, Woodger	2,000
20 April 1907	Plymouth Argyle	A	0–0		
24 April 1907	Norwich City	H	0–1		2000
27 April 1907	Brighton & Hove Albion	H	2–2	Harker, Edwards (pen.)	4,000
29 April 1907	New Brompton	A	2–4	Harker, Roberts	3,000

Pos	Team	Pld	W	D	L	GF	GA	GR	Pts
16	New Brompton	38	12	9	17	47	59	0.797	33
17	Swindon Town	38	11	11	16	43	54	0.796	33
18	Queens Park Rangers	38	11	10	17	47	55	0.855	32
19	Crystal Palace	38	8	9	21	46	66	0.697	25
20	Northampton Town	38	5	9	24	29	88	0.330	19

Rules for classification: The system of using goal average to separate two teams tied on points was used until the 1976-77 season. The points system: 2 points for a win, 1 point for a draw and 0 points for losing.

== FA Cup ==
After their exploits in the FA Cup the previous season, Crystal Palace were entered into the Cup in the final qualifying round by the Football Association. They drew Rotherham County, overcoming them 4–0 at Stamford Bridge. The match was a home tie for Palace, but due to their Crystal Palace ground already being booked for a rugby international the club had to have the tie moved. The next round, the first round proper, saw them drawn against the biggest club of the time, Newcastle United. Unbeaten at home in over a year, and unbeaten at home in the Cup since the previous century, Newcastle were expected to easily defeat Palace, but in the first great FA Cup shock, Palace went to Newcastle and won 1–0. The second round saw Palace defeat Fulham in a replay, and then the club took Brentford to a replay and won that too. Drawn at home against Everton in the quarter finals, Palace took a 1–0 lead, but were unable to hold on and drew 1–1 in front of their highest crowd to date of 35,000. In the replay at Goodison Park Palace lost 4–0 and another good cup run was at an end.

Date	Round	Opponents	H / A	Result F–A	Scorers	Attendance
8 December 1906	Fourth Qualifying Round	Rotherham County	N (Note: An international rugby match between England and South Africa was being played at Crystal Palace so the game was held at Stamford Bridge.)	4–0	Roberts (2), Harker, own goal	1,500
12 January 1907	First Round	Newcastle United	A	1–0	Astley	28,000
2 February 1907	Second Round	Fulham	A	0–0		28,000
6 February 1907	Second Round Replay	Fulham	H	1–0	Woodger	20,000
23 February 1907	Third Round	Brentford	H	1–1	Harker	31,123
27 February 1907	Third Round Replay	Brentford	A	1–0	Roberts	4,000
9 March 1907	Fourth Round	Everton	H	1–1	Astley	35,000
13 March 1907	Fourth Round Replay	Everton	A	0–4		34,340

== Squad statistics ==
Pos.	Name	League		FA Cup		Total	
Pos.	Name	Apps	Goals	Apps	Goals	Apps	Goals
GK	(England) Bob Hewitson	36	0	8	0	44	0
GK	(England) Herbert Hunter	2	0	0	0	2	0
FB	(England) Matthew Edwards	31	4	8	0	39	4
FB	(Scotland) Thomas Wills	17	0	1	0	18	0
FB	(Scotland) Harry Menzies	4	0	0	0	4	0
FB	(England) Harry Collyer	4	0	0	0	4	0
FB	(England) J. Richard Jackson	7	0	0	0	7	0
HB	(England) Wilf Innerd (c)	37	1	8	0	45	1
HB	(England) Charles Ryan	26	0	6	0	32	0
HB	(England) Bill Forster	30	0	8	0	38	0
HB	(England) Arthur Wilson	2	0	0	0	2	0
HB	(Republic of Ireland) Frank Ransom	1	0	0	0	1	0
HB	Bill Ledger	11	0	2	0	11	2
HB	(England) Henry Littlewort	1	0	0	0	1	0
HB	(England) Frank Edwards	1	0	0	0	1	0
FW	(England) Charles Wallace	35	9	7	0	42	9
FW	(England) Dick Harker	35	7	8	2	43	9
FW	(England) George Woodger	34	6	8	1	42	7
FW	(England) Archie Needham	28	0	8	0	36	0
FW	(England) Dick Roberts	36	7	8	3	44	10
FW	(England) Horace Astley	19	10	8	2	27	12
FW	(England) Joe Hodgkinson	5	1	0	0	5	1
FW	(England) William Weston	6	1	0	0	6	1
FW	(England) Arthur Sans	2	0	0	0	2	0
FW	(England) Herbert Swann	7	0	0	0	7	0
FW	Bill Lawrence	1	0	0	0	1	0
