= 1905–06 Crystal Palace F.C. season =

English football club season

Crystal Palace
1905–06 season
- Chairman: Sydney Bourne
- Manager: John Robson
- Southern Football League Division Two: 1st (promoted)
- FA Cup: First round
- Top goalscorer: League: Archie Needham 20; All: Archie Needham 21
- Highest home attendance: 5,000 (vs. Peterborough, 23 September)
- Lowest home attendance: 1,500 (vs. Fulham Reserves, 14 October)
- Average home league attendance: 2,812

Crystal Palace F.C.'s first official league season started in Division Two of the Southern League, which consisted mainly of other clubs' reserve sides alongside Grays United, Leyton, Southern United and St. Leonard's and was a successful one.

The Palace opening match was against Southampton Reserves, and approximately 3,000 people paid 6d to stand or a shilling to sit. Palace led 3–0 after 30 minutes, before fading and losing 3–4. However, that was the club's only defeat in the League all season, and Crystal Palace won the championship and were promoted to the Southern League First Division. The season included a run of 17 straight victories, and a 9–1 win over Grays United at Crystal Palace. Attendances for the season were regularly between 2,000 and 3,000 although 4,000 watched the 1–1 FA Cup tie against Blackpool. Palace also secured their record victory in this season, a friendly against West Beckenham on 24 February 1906 which Palace won 17–2.

== Southern Football League Second Division ==
Date	Opponents	H / A	Result F–A	Scorers	Attendance
2 September 1905	Southampton Reserves	H	3–4	Roberts, Needham, Thompson	3,000
16 September 1905	Swindon Town Reserves	A	2–1	Birnie, Harker	
18 September 1905	West Ham United Reserves	A	0–0		
23 September 1905	Leyton	H	0–0		
14 October 1905	Fulham Reserves	H	5–0	Wallace, Watkins (2), Needham (2)	1,500
21 October 1905	Southern United	H	1–0	Watkins	
4 November 1905	Grays United	H	9–1	Birnie, Harker (2), Watkins (2), Needham (2), Astley, Roberts	
25 November 1905	Watford Reserves	A	3–1	Roberts (2), Ross	
13 December 1905	Reading Reserves	H	3–0	Harker, Roberts, Watkins	3,000
23 December 1905	Swindon Town Reserves	H	3–0	Astley, Ross (2)	
26 December 1905	Portsmouth Reserves	H	1–0	Needham	2,000
6 January 1906	Wycombe Wanderers	A	4–1	Thompson, Needham, Wallace (2)	
20 January 1906	St Leonards United	H	3–1	Woodger (2), Thompson	3,000
27 January 1906	Grays United	A	3–0	Walker (2), Needham	
10 February 1906	West Ham United Reserves	H	3–1	Woodger (2), Needham	2,000
21 February 1906	St Leonards United	A	3–0	Needham (2), Wallace	
28 February 1906	Southern United	H	4–0	Needham (2), Woodger, own goal	
3 March 1906	Watford Reserves	H	4–0	Roberts, Needham (2), Woodger	2,000
10 March 1906	Southampton Reserves	A	2–0	Thompson, Needham	
24 March 1906	Reading Reserves	A	1–0	Needham	
7 April 1906	Leyton	A	2–1	Wallace, Needham	3,000
13 April 1906	Portsmouth Reserves	A	1–1	Watkins	8,000
14 April 1906	Wycombe Wanderers	H	4–0	Woodger (2), Moody, Needham	
17 April 1906	Fulham Reserves	A	2–2	Needham, Harker	5,000

Pos	Team	Pld	W	D	L	GF	GA	GR	Pts	Promotion or relegation
1	Crystal Palace	24	19	4	1	66	14	4.714	42	Promoted to Division One
2	Leyton	24	16	6	2	61	18	3.389	38	Promoted to Division One
3	Portsmouth II	24	12	8	4	52	24	2.167	32	
4	Fulham II	24	11	6	7	52	39	1.333	28	
5	Southampton II	24	7	9	8	39	41	0.951	23	

Rules for classification: The system of using goal average to separate two teams tied on points was used until the 1976-77 season. The points system: 2 points for a win, 1 point for a draw and 0 points for losing.

== FA Cup ==
The Crystal Palace squad of 1905–06

As a brand new club Crystal Palace had to qualify for entry into the first round proper of the FA Cup. In the first qualifying round Palace were drawn at home against Clapham. The match saw Palace run out 7–0 winners, with William Watkins scoring the first ever hat-trick. The next round saw Palace overcome the 2nd Grenadier Guards and earn a draw against Chelsea in the third qualifying round. Chelsea at the time were a big draw, fielding the famous goalkeeper, William Foulke. Sadly, Chelsea were obliged to fulfil a League fixture on the same day, and chasing promotion from the Football League Second Division, decided to concentrate on the league. They fielded a reserve side against Palace who duly ran out 7–1, with Watkins scoring another hat-trick. The ease of this victory saw the FA change the rules to ensure clubs always fielded their strongest sides. Palace then dispatched Luton Town in the fourth and final qualifying round to ensure a place in the First Round Draw. Here they were paired with Blackpool, and the tie was eventually settled in a second replay at neutral venue Villa Park after both teams failed to make home advantage pay.

Date	Round	Opponents	H / A	Result F–A	Scorers	Attendance
7 October 1905	First Qualifying Round	Clapham	H	7–0	Watkins (3), Innerd, Astley, Roberts, Harker	1,500
28 October 1905	Second Qualifying Round	2nd Grenadier Guards	A	3–0	Harker, Wallace, Astley	1,200
18 November 1905	Third Qualifying Round	Chelsea	H	7–1	Watkins (3; 2 pen.), Innerd (2), Harker, Needham	3,000
9 December 1905	Fourth Qualifying Round	Luton Town	H	1–0	Harker	5,000
13 January 1906	First Round	Blackpool	A	1–1	Harker	2,500
17 January 1906	First Round Replay	Blackpool	H	1–1 (aet)	Birnie	4,000
22 January 1906	First Round Second Replay	Blackpool	N	0–1		5,000

== Squad statistics ==
Pos.	Name	League		FA Cup		Total	
Pos.	Name	Apps	Goals	Apps	Goals	Apps	Goals
GK	(England) Bob Hewitson	24	0	7	0	31	0
FB	(England) George Walker	24	2	7	0	31	2
FB	(England) Matthew Edwards	15	0	6	0	21	0
FB	Archie Grant	15	0	2	0	17	0
HB	(England) Wilf Innerd	16	0	7	3	23	3
HB	(England) Ted Birnie (c)	22	2	7	1	29	3
HB	(England) Horace Astley	13	2	6	2	19	4
HB	Charles Palmer	1	0	0	0	1	0
HB	Arthur Wilson	7	0	0	0	0	0
HB	(England) W. Mills	1	0	0	0	1	0
HB	(England) Stan Cubberley	1	0	0	0	1	0
HB	(England) A.E. Henwood	1	0	0	0	1	0
HB	(England) John Dick	1	0	0	0	1	0
FW	(England) George Thompson	10	4	1	0	11	1
FW	(England) Dick Harker	16	5	7	5	23	10
FW	(Wales) Walter Watkins	15	7	6	6	22	13
FW	(England) Archie Needham	21	20	6	1	27	21
FW	(England) Dick Roberts	24	6	7	1	31	7
FW	(England) Charles Wallace	19	5	7	1	26	6
FW	Robert Ross	4	3	1	0	5	3
FW	(England) George Woodger	12	8	0	0	12	8
FW	(England) W. Bryden	1	0	0	0	1	0
FW	F. Moody	1	0	0	0	1	0
