= History of Crystal Palace F.C. =

History of an English football club

Crystal Palace Football Club is an English professional association football club based in Selhurst, South London, England. Although formally created as a professional outfit in 1905 at the site of the famous Crystal Palace Exhibition building, the club's origins can be traced as far back as 1861. In recognition of this, the club's official crest features that date. The club played their home games inside the grounds of the Palace at the FA Cup Final stadium from 1905 until 1915, when they were forced to leave due to the outbreak of the First World War. They moved to their current home at Selhurst Park in 1924.

Shortly after the professional club was created in 1905, Crystal Palace applied for election to the Football League, but were rejected and forced to settle for a place in the Southern League Second Division. The club were finally admitted to the Football League in 1920 and have overall mostly played in the top two tiers of English football. Their best ever top-flight season came in 1990–91, when they challenged for the English league title, but fell just short, finishing in third place behind champions Arsenal and runners-up Liverpool, to achieve the club's highest league finish to date. Palace were unfortunate to be denied a place in Europe, because although the ban on English clubs after the Heysel Stadium disaster had now been lifted, it meant England were unranked in European competitions which resulted in only one place being available in the UEFA Cup and this went to Liverpool rather than Palace. It was around this time that the club also reached the 1990 FA Cup final and became founding members of the Premier League in 1992–93.

Following their relegation from the Premier League in 1998, Palace went into decline after suffering financial problems which saw the club go into administration twice, in 1999 and 2010. But they recovered and returned to the Premier League in 2013, where the club have remained ever since. During this period, Palace also reached another two FA Cup finals, finishing runners-up in 2016, but winning the coveted trophy at the third attempt in 2025. The club followed this up by winning the 2025 FA Community Shield and their first European trophy, the 2025–26 UEFA Conference League.

== Origins and formation (1854–1905) ==
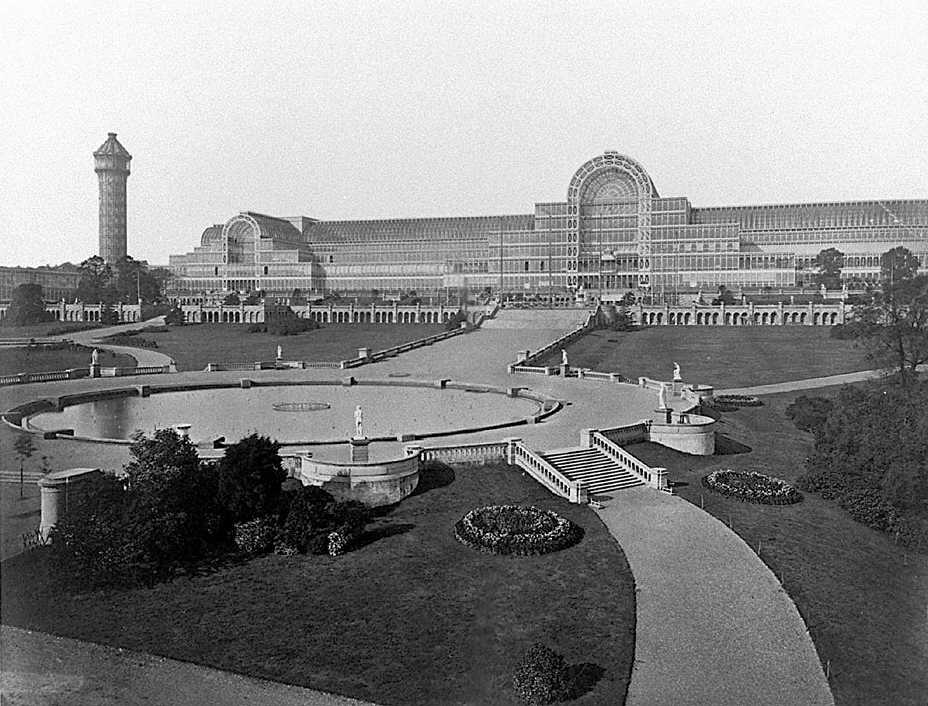
The Crystal Palace Exhibition building (1854)

Between 1852 and 1854, the glass exhibition building known as The Crystal Palace was relocated from Hyde Park, London and rebuilt in an area of South London next to Sydenham Hill. This area was renamed Crystal Palace - including the Crystal Palace Park surrounding the site where various sports facilities were built. The Crystal Palace Cricket Club was established here in 1857 and played at the cricket ground situated inside the park, before turning their attention to football after its members had lobbied to provide a continuation of sporting activities during the winter months. An amateur Crystal Palace football club was formed in 1861, with a number of its first players coming from the cricket club, and they initially shared the cricket ground. The football club went on to become one of the original founding members of the Football Association in 1863, and competed in the first ever FA Cup competition in 1871–72, reaching the semi-finals, but were eliminated by the Royal Engineers in a replay after the first game ended goalless. They also played in the FA Cup over the next four seasons before disappearing from historical records after a match against Barnes F.C. on 18 December 1875.

In 1895, the Football Association found a new permanent venue for the FA Cup final at the sports stadium situated inside the Palace grounds. The Crystal Palace Company, who owned the Palace building, were reliant on tourist activity for their income and sought fresh attractions for the venue. They founded the London County Cricket Club of W. G. Grace before deciding to form a new professional football club to play at the stadium.

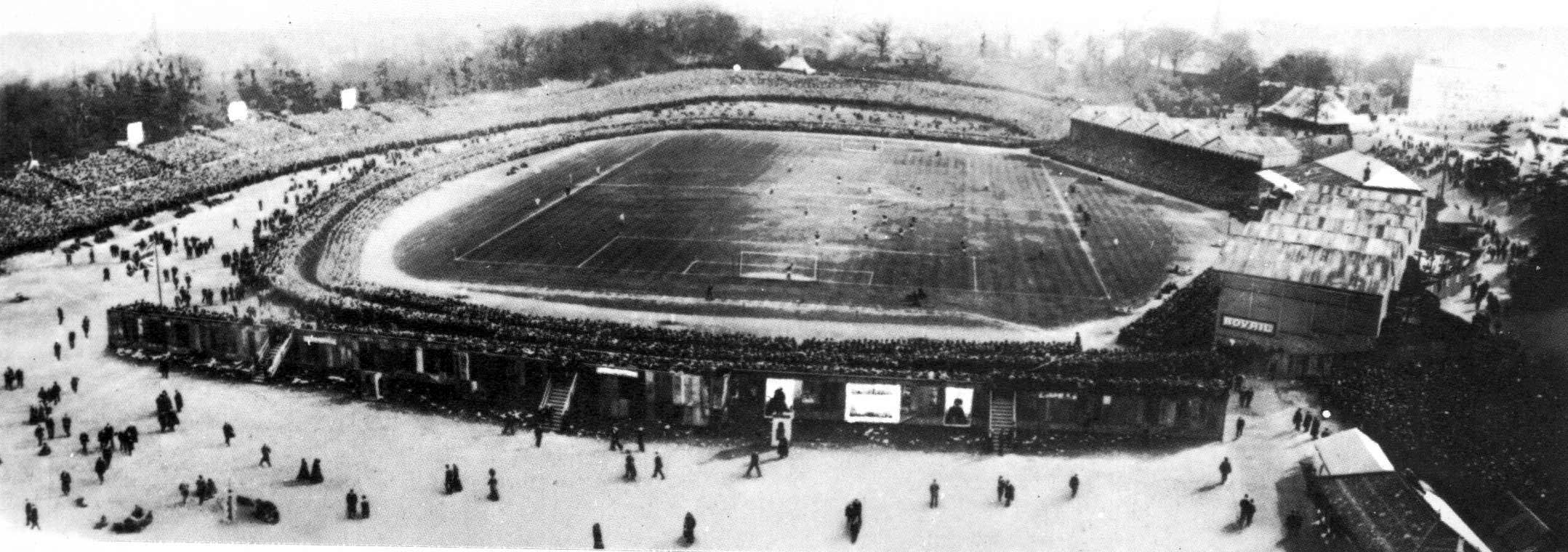
The 1905 FA Cup Final at the Crystal Palace Stadium.

The professional Crystal Palace Football Club was formed on 10 September 1905, under the chairmanship of Sydney Bourne and were assisted by Edmund Goodman, an Aston Villa employee who was recommended to Palace by the Villa chairman, William McGregor. Goodman organised the business side of the club and appointed John Robson to be the team's manager. Robson had transformed his previous club Middlesbrough from an amateur outfit to an established Football League First Division team. Goodman, a former amateur player with Villa, had his playing career cut short by an injury which led to the amputation of his right leg. He later went on to become Palace's longest ever serving manager.

== Southern League (1905–20) ==
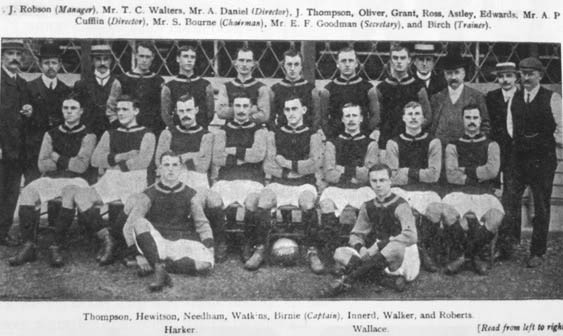
The Crystal Palace F.C. squad (1905–06).

The newly-formed professional club applied to join the Second Division of the Football League, but were rejected and forced to settle for a place in the Southern League Second Division. To increase the number of club fixtures, Palace also joined the mid-week United League, where they won their first recorded match as a professional club, 3–0 away at New Brompton. The team's manager John Robson established a squad of sixteen professionals, most of them signed from clubs in the North East area of England, where he came from. Palace's inaugural campaign in the Southern League Second Division consisted mainly of matches against other clubs' reserve sides, alongside the first teams of Wycombe Wanderers, Leyton, Southern United, St. Leonards United and Grays United. The club's opening fixture was at home against Southampton Reserves, and approximately 3,000 spectators paid 6d to stand or a shilling to be seated. Palace led 3–0 after 30 minutes, before fading and losing 3–4. However, that was the club's only defeat in the league all season, and Palace were crowned champions. The season included a run of seventeen straight victories, one of them being a 9–1 win over Grays United. The club's home attendances in the league for that season were regularly between 2,000 and 3,000 spectators.

Following their promotion, Palace started their second season as a professional club competing in the Southern League First Division, finishing in nineteenth-place, but having enjoyed better form in the FA Cup. After beating Rotherham County in a qualifying tie, Palace were drawn away to Newcastle United in the first round proper. Newcastle were one of the biggest and most successful clubs in the top-flight of English football at that time. They had played in the previous two FA Cup finals, were Football League First Division champions in 1905, and this season were on their way to another title. In what still stands as one of the club's greatest ever wins, Palace scored through Horace Astley against the run of play and then held off Newcastle to come away with a shock 1–0 win. The second and third rounds saw the club dispose of Fulham and Brentford respectively after both ties went to replays. In the quarter-finals, Palace were drawn at home to the cup holders Everton, who had been challenging Newcastle for the First Division title throughout that season. In front of a then record crowd of 35,000, Palace took the lead, but their opponents equalised taking the tie to a replay, where Everton proved too strong, running out 4–0 winners.

A headed goal scored by Palace striker Edwin Smith against Reading F.C., c. 1914.

John Robson left Palace to manage neighbours Croydon Common F.C. for the 1907–08 season, and Edmund Goodman took over as manager and club secretary. Palace had a good season, finishing fourth. Billy Davies became the first professional Palace player to be capped at international level when he was called up for Wales. The club could not sustain their league form the following season, finishing in a disappointing sixteenth-place. In the FA Cup, Palace lost 0–9 to Burnley in a second round replay, which is to date, a record defeat for the club in this competition. Palace finished seventh in the league the following season and fourth the season after, with league attendances as high as 12,000. The club recorded seventh and fifth-place finishes over the next couple of seasons and won the London Challenge Cup in 1913, overcoming West Ham United 1–0 in a replay. Palace enjoyed good form in the 1913–14 season, with the club putting together some long unbeaten runs and finishing the season runners-up to Swindon Town on goal average. They also retained the London Challenge Cup, defeating Tottenham Hotspur 2–1 in the final at Highbury, and defender Horace Colclough was called up by England to play in the team that beat Wales in Cardiff on 16 March 1914.

Following the outbreak of the First World War on 4 August 1914, the club had three players called up as Reservists before the 1914–15 season had started. Former Palace players Ginger Williams and Joe Bulcock were amongst those killed in the conflict. In March 1915, The Admiralty, who had taken over the Crystal Palace and its grounds at the start of the war, ordered the club to leave and they chose to move to nearby Herne Hill Velodrome. The club finished that season in fifteenth place. When Croydon Common F.C. failed to return to business after the war, Palace moved into their ground known as The Nest which was situated opposite Selhurst railway station. In the first full season after the war, Palace finished in third-place in 1919–20.

== The Football League (1920–58) ==
Crystal Palace became a Football League club in 1920 when the Southern League First Division clubs were admitted en bloc as founder members of a newly formed Football League Third Division. In their first season as a Football League club, Palace lost their opening game at Merthyr Town 1–2 with George Milligan scoring the club's first ever league goal. Milligan's Palace career was short-lived however, and he made just one more appearance for the club. Palace's first ever home Football League match was a disappointing 0–0 draw against Plymouth Argyle, but the club then went on a run of six consecutive wins. Goalkeeper Jack Alderson, who had been signed in 1918, kept a clean sheet in five of those wins and they lost just six more league games all season. Palace were unbeaten in the final sixteen games of the season which included an eight-game winning streak and went on to win the championship by five points from runners-up Southampton and gain promotion to the Second Division. The club conceded just 34 goals over the season, a record that stood until 1979, and joined Preston North End, Small Heath, Liverpool and Bury as the only clubs at that time to have won a championship in their first season as a league club. Palace also won their third London Challenge Cup, beating Clapton Orient 1–0 at White Hart Lane with a goal from forward John Conner.

Palace goalkeeper Jack Alderson, caricatured in the Football Special (1922). In 2005, Alderson was voted the club's third best goalkeeper of all time by fans.

The following season saw the formation of a Northern section of the Third Division which meant the southern clubs were now part of a new division called the Third Division South. But for now Palace were above all of that, and in 1921–22 they opened their second season in the Football League as a Second Division club, finishing in fourteenth-place. In the first round of the FA Cup that season, Palace achieved one of their greatest ever wins, thrashing First Division Everton 6–0 at Goodison Park. In the 1922–23 season, Palace struggled in the lower reaches of the division, finishing in sixteenth-place and the next season fared only slightly better, finishing fifteenth. It was also around this time that the club made a significant purchase which would lead to the eventual completion of a new permanent home stadium.

Back in 1919, the Palace minute book contained an entry instructing the Secretary to investigate the possibility of obtaining a lease on the 'ground at Selhurst', although calling it a 'ground' was a little misleading since at the time it was a piece of wasteland valuable only to the London, Brighton and South Coast Railway Company. At one time it had been a brickfield, and two chimney stacks still remained. On 3 January 1922, the club purchased the ground at a cost of £2,750, and renowned football stadium architect Archibald Leitch was commissioned to design Selhurst Park. Leitch had designed stands at Craven Cottage, Stamford Bridge, White Hart Lane and Leeds Road, but the design for Selhurst Park was unusual in that it had no roof gable. The other three sides of the ground remained open banking with just the lower parts being terraced. Construction work was delayed by industrial disputes, and when the ground was opened by the Lord Mayor of London on 30 August 1924, the stand had not been completed. It did however boast many luxuries, including "offices, tea rooms, training quarters, plunge, slipper, shower and needle baths". The opening fixture was against The Wednesday, and in front of a crowd of 25,000, Palace lost 0–1, with the first goal at Selhurst Park being scored by Billy Marsden. That defeat set the tone for the season, with the club eventually finishing in twenty-first place – and were relegated along with Coventry City. A win in the last game at home to Oldham Athletic would have secured survival, but Palace lost by a single goal and it would be almost 40 years before the club would again grace the second level of English football. The following year saw Selhurst Park stage the England versus Wales international on 1 March 1926. It remains the only full international match to be played at the stadium.

The club's relegation to the Third Division South eventually led to Edmund Goodman stepping down as manager three months into the 1925–26 season, after 18 years at the helm to return to administrative duties, following which a succession of managers attempted to plot Palace's climb back up the Football League pyramid. However, their stay in the division was to last as long as the existence of the Third Division South itself. With only the champions gaining promotion, it was a difficult division to get out of, although Palace came close on more than one occasion. In the fourteen Third Division South seasons pre-Second World War, Palace finished above eighth place ten times, and never lower than fourteenth and also finished runners-up no less than three times. At the start of the 1939–40 season, Palace were sitting second in the table, but the season was cancelled after just three matches with the onset of the Second World War.

The war years of 1939–45 saw football enter a period of disarray with the creation of Wartime Leagues. Palace joined the South "A" League in 1939 and the South "D" League in 1940, winning the latter competition, and then promptly won an improvised South Regional League the following season on goal average. They joined the London League for the 1941–42 season, with the clubs in London refusing to accept the ad-hoc competitions the Football League were organising. This division only lasted one season before the London clubs were back in the Football League fold, with Palace joining the Football League South for the next four seasons. The club fielded 186 different players during the seven wartime seasons.

After the war, Palace returned to the Third Division South and endured their worst season up to that point in 1948–49, finishing bottom and applying for re-election for the first time. The club kept their place and finished seventh the next campaign. They followed this up with another bottom place and re-election in 1950–51, with the unwanted record of scoring the fewest number of goals that season. Palace continued to struggle over the next few seasons and required re-election for a third and final time in 1955–56, with only Swindon Town keeping them from bottom place, and they would remain in the lower half of the division until the league was restructured in 1958.

== Rising through the divisions (1958–73) ==
The 1958–59 season began a period of change with Arthur Wait taking control of the club as chairman, and the Football League was restructured with Palace playing in the new Fourth Division. This new division had been formed with the merging of the clubs in the bottom half of the Third Division South with those in the bottom half of the Third Division North. Palace had failed to qualify for the new Third Division, falling outside the top twelve finish required by two places. Palace's first season in the Fourth Division saw them finish seventh, with the club faring slightly worse the following campaign with an eighth-place finish. Wait appointed the ex-Tottenham manager Arthur Rowe in April 1960 and the club then enjoyed a successful 1960–61 season, finishing second behind league newcomers Peterborough United who thus matched Palace's 1920–21 achievement of winning a championship in their inaugural league season. Palace also set Fourth Division records for the highest average attendance of 19,092, and the highest attendance at an individual match; 37,774 for the Good Friday game at Selhurst Park against Millwall. Surrey-born Johnny Byrne scored 31 of Palace's 110 goals that season, and his strike partner Roy Summersby contributed 25 as the club moved up to the Third Division.

Palace finished fifteenth in the Third Division at the end of the 1961–62 season. In November 1961, Byrne was called up to the England national team despite playing outside the top two divisions at the time, one of only five players ever to achieve this. He played the whole of the 1–1 draw against Northern Ireland, part of the 1962 British Home Championship, at Wembley Stadium. After international recognition, the West Ham manager Ron Greenwood paid a transfer fee of £65,000, including ex-Palace striker Ron Brett in exchange, to take "Budgie" to the Hammers in March 1962. This was a record fee between two British clubs at the time. Byrne left Palace having scored 95 goals for the club, then a post-war record.

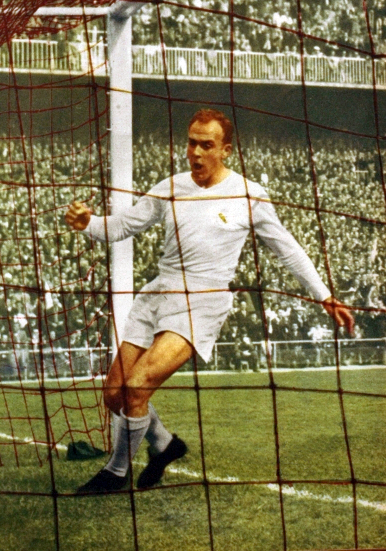
Alfredo Di Stéfano, who played for Real Madrid against Palace in 1962. The Croydon Advertiser reported that his "move that led to Madrid's fourth goal was conducted with effortless ease at walking pace."

On Wednesday 18 April 1962, Palace achieved distinction when the great Real Madrid team of that era made their first ever appearance in London in a friendly match at Selhurst Park to celebrate the opening of the club's new floodlights, and it was only two weeks before the Spanish giants were due to play Benfica in the European Cup final. Madrid beat Palace 4–3 in a thrilling match. Arthur Rowe resigned as Palace manager for health reasons in December 1962, and the club appointed former player Dick Graham to replace him. The 1962–63 season saw the club finish eleventh, before gaining promotion to the Second Division the following season, after finishing second behind Coventry City on goal average.

Over the next few seasons, Palace achieved respectable top half finishes in the Second Division, during which they appointed Bert Head as their new manager in April 1966. Head promoted from the youth team and transferred in a number of new players, including the re-signing of old favourite Johnny Byrne. His work paid dividends in the 1968–69 season when Palace, not fancied as promotion candidates at the beginning of the season, finished second behind Derby County, who were managed by Brian Clough. Palace had achieved a place in the top-flight for the first time in their history, clinching promotion with a sixteen-game unbeaten run to end the season.

The Dave Clark Five's chart-hit "Glad All Over" became a huge crowd favourite around this time, after the band performed the song at a concert staged at Selhurst Park. It was played regularly before the start of home games, with the Palace fans banging on advertising hoardings in time with the drum beat in the chorus of the song and it remains the club's anthem today.

Palace's life in the top division of English football began with a home game against Manchester United. The club's first ever Division One goal was scored by defender Mel Blyth after eleven minutes, and a second goal from new signing Gerry Queen saw Palace hold United to a 2–2 draw. The club's next match was again at home, this time against Sunderland which Palace won 2–0. However, the season soon became a long struggle against relegation for the club, but they were eventually able to secure safety, finishing in twentieth-place above demoted Sheffield Wednesday and Sunderland. Palace avoided the drop for two more seasons, and followed the trend of many other top-flight clubs by introducing a new "Player of the Year" award which has been presented at the end of every season since 1971–72. The first recipient was defender John McCormick.

Despite some good performances in the 1972–73 season, most notably a 5–0 home win against Manchester United, Palace eventually succumbed to relegation in their fourth season in the top-flight. Arthur Wait, having overseen the rise of the club from the Fourth to the First Division, was replaced as chairman by Raymond Bloye in November 1972, and the club appointed Malcolm Allison as the new manager in March the following year, replacing Bert Head. In Allison's first game in charge at home against Chelsea, he gave a debut to young Scottish defender Jim Cannon. Palace had never won a London derby in the top-flight up to this point, but Cannon, who had come through the youth ranks, marked Chelsea's star striker Peter Osgood out of the game and then scored the second goal in a 2–0 win to begin a long career with the club.

== The coming of The Eagles (1973–84) ==
Despite relegation, the 1973–74 season started with much optimism among the Palace supporters. Malcolm Allison had a strong recent record as a coach, having won trophies with Manchester City as an assistant to Joe Mercer in the late 1960s. Allison or 'Big Mal' as he was nicknamed in the press, had a flamboyant personality which was something of a change for the club, who previously had a rather conservative image. Palace's nickname was changed from "The Glaziers" to "The Eagles" and the club also changed its kit colours from their traditional claret and blue to a red and dark blue scheme inspired by Barcelona. The Eagle was introduced as the club mascot at this time, an idea borrowed from Benfica, and the club badge was redesigned. The new campaign saw the introduction of a three-up, three-down promotion and relegation system. Palace struggled to adjust to life in the Second Division, failing to win any of their first fifteen league games. In bottom place for most of the season, the club aided by the signing from Southend United of talented winger Peter Taylor, climbed to seventeenth-place with a 3–1 win at Fulham on Good Friday. Palace then lost three consecutive matches which saw them needing to win in their final game of the season at Cardiff City to remain in the second tier of English football. They could only draw 1–1, and suffered relegation for a second successive season.

Allison's rebranded Palace crest.

The 1974–75 season saw Palace back in the Third Division for the first time since 1963–64, and they missed out on promotion, finishing in fifth place. Allison signed Terry Venables and Ian Evans from QPR with Don Rogers moving the other way in a trade that was to be significant to Palace's, and indeed England's football future. It was also around this time that Allison persuaded the club to put more resources into developing a strong youth team, a decision that would lead to both success at youth level, and the emergence of a number of promising young players in the first team. Palace again failed to gain promotion the following season, distracted in part by their run in the FA Cup which took the club to the semi-finals, beating Leeds United and Chelsea along the way, before losing 0–2 to Southampton at Stamford Bridge on 3 April 1976. Allison resigned at the end of the season, partly because of the failure to get Palace promoted, but he had also come under scrutiny due to some of his off the field antics, including being photographed in the team bath with actress and glamour model Fiona Richmond.

Allison was replaced as manager by Terry Venables, who had been his assistant the previous season, and he guided the club to promotion at the first attempt. The Palace youngsters also won the FA Youth Cup with a side including Kenny Sansom, Vince Hilaire and Billy Gilbert. They repeated this achievement the following season to become the first team to win the FA Youth Cup in successive seasons since Chelsea did in 1960 and 1961. These talented young players had become regulars in the first team by the 1978–79 season which saw Palace vying not only for promotion, but also the Second Division title. The final game of the season was on a Friday night at home to Burnley on 11 May 1979. In front of the club's record home crowd of 51,482, there was all to play for: a Palace win, and they would be crowned champions; a draw would mean promotion for Palace, but they would hand the title to fierce rivals Brighton; a defeat would see Sunderland clinch the final promotion place instead of Palace. At half-time the deadlock had not been broken despite Palace's dominance, but a second-half cross from Vince Hilaire allowed Ian Walsh to head the opener, before a great run by David Swindlehurst was completed by a finish from outside the penalty area to give the Eagles a 2–0 win. Palace were crowned champions, and had reached the top-flight again.

As an increasing number of players from the FA Youth Cup winning team had now established themselves in the first team, the press dubbed Palace the "Team of the Eighties". They began the 1979–80 season well, staying unbeaten longer than any other club in the top-flight, and also briefly went top of the whole Football League when they beat Ipswich Town 4–1 at Selhurst Park in late September. Unfortunately the young starlets could not keep this form up, and a slide down the table resulted in Palace finishing thirteenth, which at that point was the club's highest ever league finish.

The slide continued into the 1980–81 season, with nine defeats in the first ten games, which saw Venables quit Palace to join QPR. The club were also suffering financial problems, and were virtually relegated by the end of January when another, even bigger change occurred. Ron Noades, previously the chairman of Wimbledon, led a consortium to take financial control of the club, purchasing it from Raymond Bloye. Palace spent the next couple of seasons flirting with relegation from the second tier and there were numerous managerial changes, including the unpopular appointment of ex-Brighton manager Alan Mullery.

== Steve Coppell era (1984–93) ==
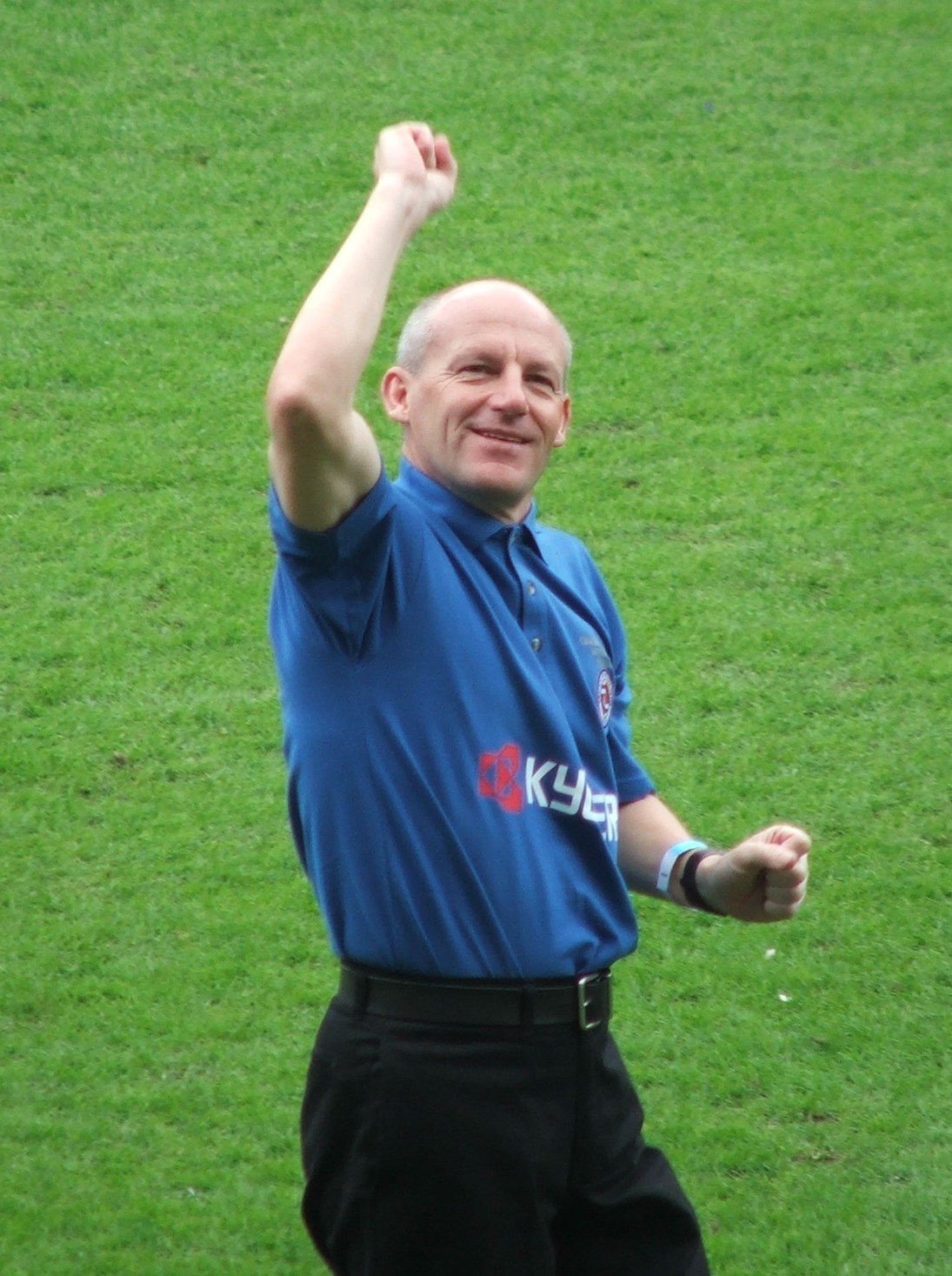
Steve Coppell, who led Palace to an FA Cup Final and a third place finish in the top-flight. He managed the club over four separate spells.

The former Manchester United and England winger Steve Coppell was appointed as Crystal Palace's new manager for the 1984–85 season. Coppell, whose playing career had been cut short by a knee injury, worked on rebuilding the club and was assisted by former Palace player Ian Evans. They signed the then unknown Ian Wright from non-league Greenwich Borough and Mark Bright from Leicester City, who went on to form the successful "Wrighty & Brighty" strike partnership. Coppell stabilised the club in his first two seasons, and after a further two seasons of narrowly missing out on the play-offs, they followed this up by only just missing out on automatic promotion by a single point. The club instead entered the 1989 Second Division play-offs, beating Swindon in the semi-finals to set up a two-legged final against Blackburn Rovers. In the first leg at Ewood Park, the Lancashire club won 3–1, but a 30,000 full capacity at Selhurst Park saw the Eagles triumph 3–0 after extra-time in the second leg to end their eight-year exile from the top-flight. Ian Wright, who scored 24 league goals, and 33 in all competitions in the promotion campaign, was voted player of the year by the club's supporters.

Palace began their first top-flight campaign in almost a decade by re-signing former youth team product Andy Gray from QPR for £500,000. Gray had been a regular in the Palace first team between 1984 and 1987. The club hit the headlines in November 1989, when they signed Bristol Rovers goalkeeper Nigel Martyn for £1 million – a record fee for a goalkeeper in Britain at that time. Palace's form was mixed and they ended up finishing fifteenth after spending most of the first half of the season in the top ten. But it was in the FA Cup that the club really shone. After a succession of ties against lower division teams (Portsmouth, Huddersfield Town, Rochdale and Cambridge United), Palace reached the semi-finals, drawing the same Liverpool team that had beaten them 9–0 in the league earlier in the season. The tie was played at Villa Park, and saw Liverpool score first to lead 1–0 at half-time. Palace emerged from the interval with more of an attacking intent, and within a minute of the restart equalised through Mark Bright. After going 2–1 up, Palace then found themselves 2–3 down late in the match and were seemingly beaten. However an equaliser by Andy Gray with just two minutes remaining took the tie into extra-time, with the winner for the Eagles scored by Alan Pardew in a thrilling 4–3 victory and for the first time in their history, Palace had reached the FA Cup Final.

Their first ever appearance at Wembley Stadium saw Palace facing Alex Ferguson's Manchester United. Gary O'Reilly opened the scoring for Palace, but Bryan Robson and Mark Hughes put United 2–1 up. Ian Wright then equalised immediately after coming on as a substitute to take the final into extra-time, before scoring again early in the added period to put Palace back in the lead. Hughes scored his second late on for United to leave the game drawn 3–3 and requiring a replay. Palace chose to wear a new one-off change strip of yellow and black striped shirts for the replay. The match was a tense affair won by a single goal from United left-back Lee Martin, who capped an inspired 40-yard run to get on the end of a cross from Neil Webb and convert to secure the Cup for the Red Devils.

The club built on the success of the previous campaign and even challenged for the English league title for most of the following season, but fell just short, finishing in third place behind champions Arsenal and runners-up Liverpool, to achieve the club's highest league finish to date. Palace were unfortunate to be denied a place in Europe, because although the ban on English clubs after the Heysel Stadium disaster of 1985 had now been lifted, it meant England were unranked in European competitions which resulted in only one place being available in the 1991–92 edition of the UEFA Cup, and this went to Liverpool rather than Palace. That season also saw Palace make their third trip to Wembley in twelve months, where they won the Full Members Cup beating Everton 4–1 after extra-time in the final.

The following season was to become one marked by controversy for the club. In September 1991, Channel 4 showed a documentary called Critical Eye – Great Britain United, which featured interviews with a number of club personnel. Among them was chairman Ron Noades, who commented "the black players at this club lend the side a lot of skill and flair, but you also need white players in there to balance things up and give the team some brains and common sense". Noades claimed he was reported out of context, an allegation rejected by the programme makers, and his comments stunned Palace's many black players. Ian Wright left the club soon after, transferring to Arsenal for £2.5 million and Palace finished tenth in the First Division at the end of the 1991–92 season. A breakaway by the top 22 clubs saw Palace become founding members of the new FA Premier League in 1992–93. Mark Bright was sold to Sheffield Wednesday in September and the Eagles struggled to score goals without him. They were relegated on goal difference, after Oldham Athletic's 4–3 victory over Southampton on the last day of the season. Palace's 49 points from 42 games that season became the joint-highest total of any club ever to have been relegated from the top-flight of English football, and remains a Premier League record. The club's relegation prompted the resignation of Coppell after nine years at the helm, and he was succeeded by his assistant Alan Smith.

== Ups and downs (1993–98) ==
Alan Smith immediately guided Palace back to the Premier League as runaway champions of the second tier, with striker Chris Armstrong top-scoring with 22 league goals. During this period the club badge was changed, with the image of the bird on it replaced by one which the chairman Ron Noades felt more closely resembled that of an eagle. The following season back in the Premier League saw the club again making news for off the field reasons. On 25 January 1995, Palace played Manchester United at Selhurst Park. After a bad foul on the Palace defender Richard Shaw, United's maverick French forward Eric Cantona was sent off. As Cantona walked towards the tunnel he was taunted by Palace fan Matthew Simmons. This angered the frenchman, who launched a flying kick at Simmons with both feet. Manchester United suspended Cantona for the remainder of the season, while the French Football Federation dropped him from the France national football team and he was also stripped of the captaincy of Les Bleus. Cantona was sentenced to two weeks in jail; this was reduced to 120 hours community service on appeal. Simmons was immediately banned from Selhurst Park and later found guilty of two charges of using threatening words and behaviour towards Cantona. More was to follow in March, when Chris Armstrong was suspended by the FA for failing a drugs test. Palace reached the semi-finals of both domestic cups, but a shortage of goals counted against them, alongside the introduction of a fourth relegation place. The Premier League was being cut from 22 to 20 clubs at the end of the 1994–95 season and Palace unluckily found themselves demoted on the last day again.

Smith left the club by "mutual agreement" within days of Palace's relegation. Steve Coppell returned as technical director, with Ray Lewington handling first team affairs, assisted by former Palace player Peter Nicholas at the start of the 1995–96 season. This set-up was augmented in February with Dave Bassett joining as manager, overseeing a run of form which took the club to the 1996 First Division play-off final. Palace suffered agony in the final at Wembley losing 1–2 against Leicester City in dramatic fashion after a long range Steve Claridge goal in the final minute of extra-time. Bassett then departed to Nottingham Forest in March 1997, but Coppell took over as manager again and the club reached the play-off final for the second year running. Palace achieved promotion back to the Premier League after defeating Sheffield United 1–0, with David Hopkin scoring the winner in the 90th minute.

The 1997–98 season saw a new board member and new arrivals on the pitch. Mark Goldberg was the new board member who had aspirations to take over the club and spent the first part of season negotiating with Ron Noades. Goldberg's initial plans involved the club becoming part owned by Juventus, and it was from this source that Palace gained two Italian stars, Attilio Lombardo and Michele Padovano. Goldberg agreed a deal to gain control of the club in February 1998, with Palace bottom of the Premier League, and moved Coppell to Director of Football. The club appointed Lombardo as player-manager, with former Swedish international striker Tomas Brolin as his assistant. The pair failed to achieve an improvement in form and Palace were demoted back to the second tier, having won just two home games all season and finishing bottom of the table with 33 points. Lombardo and Brolin were replaced as the management team by out-going chairman Noades and Ray Lewington for the last three games of the campaign. Despite finishing bottom, the club's application for a place in the UEFA Intertoto Cup to be held during the summer was approved. Goldberg's takeover of Palace was finally completed in early June, although Noades maintained ownership of the ground, leasing it back to the club to use.

== Two administrations, recovery and promotion (1998–2013) ==
The club's first experience of European football was brief, entering the UEFA Intertoto Cup in the Third Round with a tie against Samsunspor of Turkey, Palace lost 0–4 on aggregate. Terry Venables had returned to the club for a second spell after being appointed head coach, but the dream of success for the 1998–99 season quickly turned sour due to owner Mark Goldberg being unable to sustain his financial backing of the club and they were placed into administration. Venables left and Steve Coppell returned to manage Palace once again, with Peter Morley installed as temporary chairman. Coppell guided the club to consecutive mid-table finishes and in July 2000, Singapore financier Jerry Lim purchased an almost bankrupt Crystal Palace, immediately selling the club on to millionaire businessman and lifelong fan Simon Jordan. Soon after taking control, Jordan replaced Coppell with Alan Smith who returned to the club for a second spell as manager. Despite reaching the semi-final of the League Cup, Smith was sacked in April 2001, with relegation to the third tier looking imminent. Long-serving coach and former Palace player Steve Kember was put in temporary charge of the first team alongside Terry Bullivant, and relegation was avoided on the last day of the season with an 87th-minute Dougie Freedman goal away to Stockport County.

Palace turned to former Manchester United captain Steve Bruce as their new permanent manager for the 2001–02 season. After a good start, Bruce attempted to walk out on the club after only four months in charge following an approach by Birmingham City to become their new manager, and was put on gardening leave for a short period. Palace eventually allowed Bruce to join Birmingham, and replaced him with Trevor Francis, who ironically had been his predecessor at St Andrew's. After just two seasons, Francis was sacked, and Steve Kember was appointed manager on a permanent basis. Kember led Palace to victories in their opening three games of the 2003–04 Division One campaign, which put the club at the top of the table, but was sacked at the beginning of November after a dismal spell of form saw them drop near to the relegation zone. Kit Symons was appointed caretaker player-manager and oversaw an improvement in form before the permanent appointment of Iain Dowie as manager was made in December. Dowie, a former Palace player, transformed the club from relegation candidates at Christmas into play-off contenders by April, and they reached the play-off final at the Millennium Stadium beating West Ham United 1–0 with a goal from captain Neil Shipperley to return to the Premiership. However, the next campaign brought more disappointment as the club once again could not keep their seat at the top table despite the 21 goals struck by Andrew Johnson, the second highest goalscorer in the division. At that time, Palace held the unwanted distinction of being the only club to have been relegated from the Premier League four times.

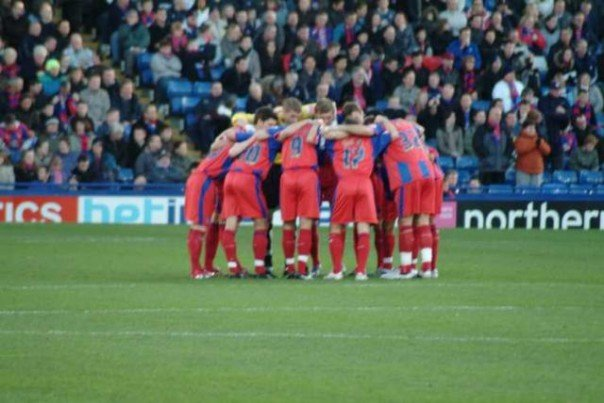
Palace players huddle before a match at Selhurst Park in 2007.

The following season saw the club reach the play-offs for the second time in three seasons, but on this occasion they failed to progress to the final, losing to Watford. Palace also lost another manager with Dowie leaving the club on 22 May 2006, after stating that he wanted to be closer to his family in Bolton. Simon Jordan had accepted Dowie's reasons and waived a £1million compensation fee in his contract. However, when Dowie was appointed as manager of local rivals Charlton Athletic just a week later, Jordan pursued him through the courts, eventually settling the affair in April 2008. Former Palace fans favourite Peter Taylor succeeded Dowie as manager for the 2006–07 season. Taylor was unsuccessful in getting the club promoted, and he was replaced by Neil Warnock two months into the following season. Warnock guided Palace to the 2008 Championship play-offs where they lost in the semi-finals to Bristol City. The club followed this up with a disappointing fifteenth-place finish the next season.

The 2009–10 season began with the club in financial uncertainty after failing to pay bonuses to former players, as well as money owed to Bristol City for the transfer of Australian international midfielder Nick Carle twelve months before. The Football League placed a transfer embargo on Palace in early August, which was lifted near the end of that month. However, it was only another three weeks before a second embargo was put into effect, this time due to an unpaid portion of a transfer fee owed to Ipswich Town for striker Alan Lee. The financial problems came to a head at the end of January 2010, when the club was forced into administration by a creditor called Agilo Finance. The P&A Partnership and its representative Brendan Guilfoyle, were appointed administrators, and took over the day to day running of the club. Star players soon departed including Victor Moses who was sold to Wigan Athletic, and manager Neil Warnock also left at the beginning of March to take over the helm at QPR. Paul Hart was appointed caretaker manager along with former Palace players Dougie Freedman and John Pemberton returning to the club as assistant and first team coach respectively. Before administration, the Eagles appeared to be building towards a run for the play-offs, but the ten-point deduction the club suffered as a result, turned the season into a battle against relegation. Survival was only achieved on the final day, with a memorable 2–2 draw at Sheffield Wednesday, who were demoted to League One instead of Palace. Following the end of the season, Freedman replaced Hart as temporary manager and the club emerged from administration owned by a consortium of wealthy fans called CPFC 2010. The consortium praised the efforts of the Palace fans who led a campaign which helped secure the freehold of Selhurst Park by putting pressure on Lloyds Bank to sell the ground back to the club.

The CPFC 2010 consortium, consisting of businessmen Steve Parish, Martin Long, Stephen Browett and Jeremy Hosking, appointed former Scotland boss George Burley as the club's new manager for the 2010–11 season, with Dougie Freedman remaining as his assistant. Palace were short on players, with several members of the squad from the previous season having departed. One of Burley's first signings to bridge this gap was former Netherlands midfielder Edgar Davids. The club did not make a good start to the season, and by November sat bottom in the Championship table, with Davids departing. Palace's away form in the first half of the season had been poor and a 0–3 South London derby defeat at Millwall on New Year's Day saw Burley sacked. Freedman was promoted to manager, and Lennie Lawrence was brought in as his assistant to provide some much needed experience. The duo successfully guided Palace to safety with a game to spare.

In the midst of the managerial change from Burley to Freedman, the club announced plans to relocate back to the site of the Crystal Palace National Sports Centre, built on their original home, and redeveloping it into a 40,000-seater, purpose-built football stadium. However, it was not long before the club abandoned those plans, and instead put forward proposals for the redevelopment of Selhurst Park. The following season started well, and by late October the club were sitting in third place in the league. Palace were also enjoying a good League Cup run that saw them beat Crawley Town, Wigan Athletic, Middlesbrough and Southampton to set up a quarter final tie away at Manchester United. However league form began to slip and Palace went on a run of five winless games without even scoring immediately prior to the match against United. Entering the tie as obvious underdogs, a 35-yard strike from Darren Ambrose and an extra-time header from Glenn Murray saw Palace win at Old Trafford for the first time in 22 years. The club's league form though remained patchy, and the semi-final of the League Cup ended in a penalty shoot-out defeat to Cardiff City. Palace finished the 2011–12 season in seventeenth place, an improvement on the previous campaign.

Freedman took charge for a third season in 2012–13 – Palace's eighth consecutive campaign in the Championship – before departing to manage Bolton Wanderers on 23 October 2012. After the brief caretaker tenures of Lennie Lawrence and Curtis Fleming, the former QPR and Blackpool manager Ian Holloway was appointed as the new permanent Palace manager in early November. His first game in charge was a 5–0 home win against Ipswich Town which put the club at the top of the table. However, a poor run of results towards the end of the season saw Palace only scrape into the play-offs by finishing fifth. They played Brighton in the semi-final, achieving a 2–0 aggregate win after a 0–0 draw at Selhurst Park in the first-leg; both goals in the second-leg were scored by Wilfried Zaha. Palace met Watford at Wembley in the final, winning 1–0 courtesy of a Kevin Phillips penalty in extra-time which ensured a return to the Premier League for the Eagles after an eight-year absence.

== Back among the elite, Cup kings and European glory (2013–present) ==
In October of the 2013–14 season, Holloway quit as manager, with the club having only taken three points from their first eight games in the Premier League. He was replaced by former Stoke City manager Tony Pulis, who led the team to safety, but then resigned just two days before the start of the 2014–15 season. Neil Warnock returned to Palace for a second spell as manager, but was sacked on 27 December 2014, with the club in the relegation zone. In January, former Palace player Alan Pardew was confirmed as the new manager, signing a three-and-a-half-year contract with the club after a compensation package of £3.5 million was agreed with Newcastle United for his release. Under Pardew, the club won eight games out of twelve in the new year, eventually securing mid-table safety and a third consecutive season in the Premier League.

The following season saw Palace reach their first FA Cup Final for 26 years against Manchester United, who they were defeated by in the 1990 final. Palace would suffer disappointment again, losing 1–2 after extra-time. Pardew was sacked on 22 December 2016 after a poor run of results, and the following day Sam Allardyce was appointed as the new manager, signing a 2½-year contract. Allardyce left Palace two days after the end of the 2016–17 season for personal reasons. On 26 June 2017, former Dutch international Frank de Boer signed a three-year deal to become the club's first ever permanent foreign manager, but was sacked after losing all of his first four games in the league. He was replaced by former England manager Roy Hodgson, who at the age of 70 became the oldest appointee in Premier League history. However poor results continued for a few more games, and Palace achieved the unenviable record of the worst start to a season in English football history with seven successive defeats and no goals scored. Despite their nightmare start, the club eventually finished in a respectable eleventh place in the Premier League at the end of the 2017–18 season. This was followed by twelfth and fourteenth-place finishes in the following two seasons. After another fourteenth-place finish in the 2020–21 season, Hodgson left the club upon the expiration of his contract.

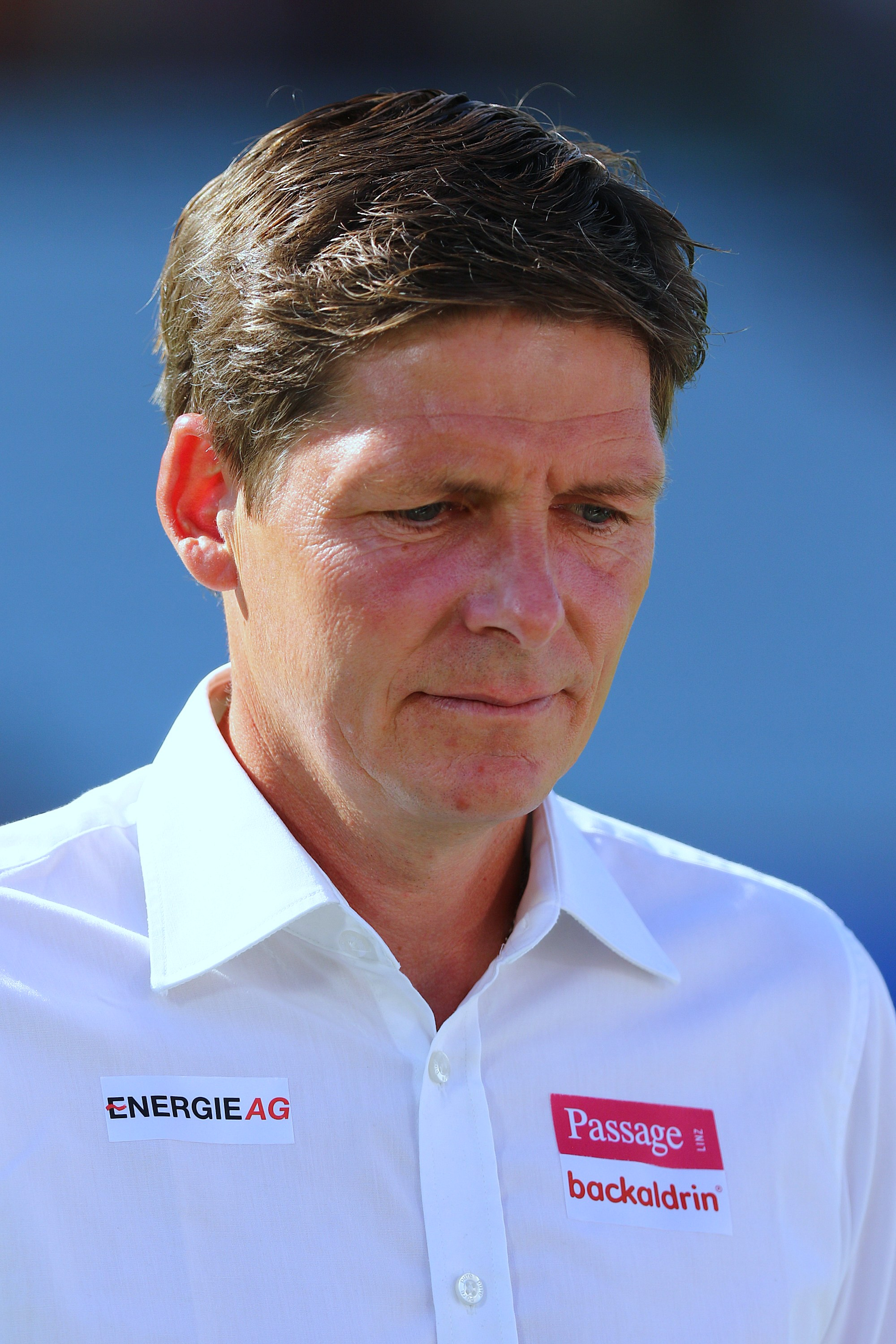
Oliver Glasner led Palace to their first major trophy, the FA Cup in 2025, and European football for the first time.

On 4 July 2021, Palace appointed former Arsenal legend Patrick Vieira as their new manager on a three-year contract. The Frenchman led the club to a twelfth-place finish and an FA Cup semi-final in his first full season. However, he was dismissed in March 2023 after a dismal winless run of 12 games, which had left the club in a relegation battle. That same month, Roy Hodgson was re-appointed Palace manager until the end of the season. His experience proved crucial as he successfully guided the club to safety, finishing in eleventh-place in the Premier League at the end of the 2022–23 season. Hodgson was appointed permanent manager for a second time at the start of the following season, but stepped down from the role prematurely on 19 February 2024. On the same day, he was replaced by former Eintracht Frankfurt manager Oliver Glasner.

Glasner made an instant impact and Palace achieved a strong finish at the end of the 2023–24 season, winning six of their last seven league games. The following season, Glasner steered Palace to their first ever major trophy, with a 1–0 victory over Manchester City in the 2025 FA Cup final, which also saw the club qualify for the UEFA Europa League for the first time. However, their place in that competition came under threat due to UEFA's strict rules on multi-club ownership, which in Palace's case involved their majority shareholder John Textor also owning French club Lyon, who had qualified for the Europa League as well. This eventually led to UEFA ruling that Palace were in breach of the rules on multi-club ownership and therefore should be demoted to the UEFA Conference League. The club took their appeal to the Court of Arbitration for Sport (CAS), who upheld UEFA's ruling on 11 August 2025.

At the start of the 2025–26 season, Palace followed up their FA Cup triumph by winning the 2025 FA Community Shield. The club also progressed to the group stages of the UEFA Conference League, after defeating Norwegian club Fredrikstad 1–0 on aggregate, in the qualifying play-off round. In the third round of the FA Cup, Palace as the holders, lost to sixth-tier Macclesfield in arguably the greatest shock of all time in the competition. However, the club made amends in the Conference League, progressing through the group stages and subsequent knockout rounds to reach their first major European final. On 27 May 2026, Palace beat Spanish club Rayo Vallecano 1–0 in Leipzig to win their first European trophy. Glasner departed the club at the end of the season after his contract expired, and was replaced by Pierre Sage, the former RC Lens manager who signed a three-year contract. But after a poor start to the season, which saw only two wins from their first ten league games and the club bottom, Sage was sacked on 12 November 2026. He was replaced by Thomas Frank four days later.
