= Newcastle United F.C. 0–1 Crystal Palace F.C. (1907) =

Football match played in 1907

Newcastle United 0–1 Crystal Palace
- Event: 1906–07 FA Cup
Newcastle United	Crystal Palace
0	1
- Date: 12 January 1907
- Venue: St James' Park, Newcastle
- Referee: A.G. Hines
- Attendance: 28,000 (estimate)

Newcastle United v Crystal Palace was a football match played on 12 January 1907 at St James' Park, Newcastle. The match was an FA Cup First Round match. The result, a 1–0 victory for Crystal Palace, is notable for being one of the greatest shocks in the history of the FA Cup.

The home team, Newcastle United, played in the Football League First Division, the highest level of English football at that time. They had been in the FA Cup final for the previous two seasons and had won the First Division title as recently as 1904–05. They had also maintained an unbeaten at home record which had started on 25 November 1905. Crystal Palace were a non-league side formed the previous year who were playing in the Southern League.

== The build-up ==
As a Southern League team, Palace were required to enter the FA Cup at the Fourth Qualifying Round stage whereas Newcastle, a top-flight team, entered at the First Round stage. Palace had to overcome Rotherham County in their qualifier. With their home stadium already booked to host a Rugby International game, Palace were forced to move the tie to neutral territory, and an estimated 1,500 fans made the trip to Stamford Bridge to watch them triumph 4–0 to ensure a place in the draw for the First Round. When the draw was made, of the 32 ties Newcastle were thought to have the easiest game in the whole round. They were drawn at home, where they had not been beaten in League or Cup since November 25, 1905. In fact, Newcastle had not lost a home tie in the FA Cup since the previous century, 11 years earlier in 1896. They were the pre-eminent side of the era, having been to the Cup Final on the previous two occasions and having won the League in 1904–05. They were again going well in the First Division season, having dropped the fewest points of all the teams. In strict contrast, Palace were only halfway through their second season as a club. The previous season had seen them begin their career in football in the Southern League Second Division, and they were now struggling to compete in the First Division.

The two sides met at St James' Park on 12 January 1907 for the scheduled First Round match.

== Match summary ==
Newcastle played in their traditional shirts of black and white, paired with blue shorts. Palace were still playing in the claret and blue kit handed down from Aston Villa, paired with white shorts. The Magpies fielded a side featuring ten internationals, whilst Palace could count only four players who had tasted the Football League. The Glaziers captain Wilf Innerd had been on the books for Newcastle United, but had only made three appearances for the club, and Bill Forster and Archie Needham had managed twenty appearances between them for Sheffield United. The Palace team had been drawn predominately from the North of players who struggled to get into their home teams by former Middlesbrough manager Jack Robson. Thanks to these roots the squad were able to find accommodation for free and travelled up the day before, so avoiding a six-hour journey on the day of the match.

The stadium was filled with 28,000 Newcastle fans, while no more than a dozen Londoners had made the trip, with Palace themselves believing only two or three of their own supporters were in the crowd. It was a cold and wet January day, with a light breeze, and the Newcastle fans gave the Palace team a good reception, rather than the hostile one they might have been expecting. When the game got under way Newcastle started off somewhat complacently. Their passes were going astray and they allowed Palace to impose themselves. Before long the Southern league side were in control. Dickie Roberts, playing on the wing for Palace, was too much for Newcastle's Scottish international defender Andy McCombie, and whilst his crosses were mostly coming to nothing, they were starting to unsettle the crowd. The opening twenty minutes were largely chance free, but then Roberts turned McCombie once again and had the ball in the net, only for the goal to be disallowed controversially as off-side.

Newcastle were shocked into action, and the Palace goalkeeper Hewitson failed to keep out a Howie strike which was likewise ruled out for off-side. The decision seemed to unnerve Newcastle, and they once again lost impetus. Palace then took the lead through Horace Astley not long before half-time. Reports differ as to whether Astley seized on a clearance or received a pass from George Woodger, but the old Millwall opportunist managed to evade the Newcastle defenders and crash a shot past an astonished Jimmy Lawrence. The Magpies started the second half the stronger side, but although they had the better of the play and possession, they failed to make it count. Palace were quick on the counter-attack, and Lawrence twice had to deny Woodger the chance to double the lead in the fifteen minutes after the restart. Palace's attacking energy was lost after a crunching collision between Newcastle's forward Speedie and Palace's centre half Ryan. Both men were injured, and whilst Newcastle pushed Speedie out wide, Palace left Ryan in the middle but also pulled back Woodger, Astley and Harker in an attempt to close the game down. With Palace sitting back, Newcastle threw everything into attacking football. With six minutes to go Ryan was again injured, this time forced off the field, leaving Palace reduced to ten men.

Hewiston came under terrible pressure for the remainder of the match, with Newcastle forcing a corner which led to a tremendous goal-mouth scramble, ended when the keeper calmly asserted his authority. It was one of his many clearances that brought the game to an end with the referee blowing for full-time. The Palace players received a standing ovation from the Newcastle fans, and the Geordie support was commended in turn by the Palace club as exemplary in the programme notes of their next match. News of the result astounded the nation, with the Athletic News stating that it would "be many a long day before the glorious victory will be forgotten", The Daily Mirror wrote that to "say that the result is the surprise of the round would be to put it mildly", and The Penny Illustrated Paper declared the result was "to the utter astonishment of the football world". With some of the team remaining in the North-East to spend time with family, a depleted squad made the six hour journey home, arriving at midnight. They were astonished to find themselves feted by the West Norwood temperance band and around 2000 fans. When the rest of the team returned home on the Monday, an even larger crowd gathered to hoist captain Innerd along to Anerley and back.

== Match details ==
1907-01-12

Newcastle United	0 – 1	Crystal Palace
		Astley 41'

St James' Park, Newcastle
Attendance: 28,000 (est.)
Referee: A.G. Hines, Nottingham

Newcastle United	Crystal Palace

GK
Coach:
(Scotland) Frank Watt

(Scotland) Jimmy Lawrence
(Scotland) Andy McCombie
(Ireland) Billy McCracken
(Scotland) Alex Gardner
(England) Colin Veitch (c)
(Scotland) Peter McWilliam
(England) Jock Rutherford
(Scotland) Jimmy Howie
(Scotland) Finlay Speedie
(Scotland) Ronald Orr
(England) Bert Gosnell

GK	(England) Bob Hewitson
	(England) Matthew Edwards
	(England) Archie Needham
	(England) Bill Forster
	(England) Charles Ryan
	(England) Wilf Innerd (c)
	(England) Dick Roberts
	(England) George Woodger
	(England) Horace Astley
	(England) Dick Harker
	(England) Charlie Wallace
Manager:
(England) Jack Robson

MATCH RULES

- 90 minutes
- 30 minutes of extra-time if necessary
- Match replayed if scores still level
- No substitutes

== Legacy ==
Palace took home their share of a gate of £841, and went on to play Fulham in the Second Round, drawing 0–0 at Craven Cottage. The replay at Crystal Palace was played on 6 February in front of an estimated 20,000 spectators. Palace won 1–0 to progress to the Third Round. Here they faced Brentford, and after a 1–1 draw they went to Griffin Park and won 1–0. Their prize in the Quarter Finals was a home tie against the holders, Everton. Watched by an estimated 35,000, Palace established a 1–0 lead in the first half, but could not hold on and the game was drawn 1–1. The club made the long trip to Goodison Park on the 13 March and were duly beaten 4–0. At the end of the season they finished 19th in the Southern League. It would take until 1965 for the club to match their run to the Quarter Finals.

Meanwhile, Newcastle were to remain unbeaten at home in the League for the rest of the season, eventually winning the First Division by three points. They went on to win the Division again in the 1908–09 season. The Magpies were never to win the cup in a final held at the Crystal Palace stadium, and this defeat to Palace only added to the idea that a jinx of some sort prevailed between Newcastle and the location. While Newcastle featured in five FA Cup finals during the time it was played at Crystal Palace, their only victory came courtesy of a replay at Goodison Park in 1910.

Of the Crystal Palace players involved in the match George Woodger would go on to play for Oldham Athletic and represent England on one occasion, while Charlie Wallace would move to Aston Villa and win both the League in 1910 and the FA Cup in 1913 and 1920. In the 1913 FA Cup Final Wallace became the first player to miss a penalty in a cup final.

Thirteen years and a world war later Crystal Palace again were drawn against Newcastle in the first round of the FA Cup. The press had not forgotten the precedent with the Dundee Evening Telegraph reporting, "Now the moment for revenge has arrived – after 13 years – but even yet the name Crystal Palace is sufficient to cause trepidation in the minds of Newcastle supporters." Newcastle won 2–0.
