= Woodger =

Woodger is an English surname. It is an occupational surname; originally, the word woodger meant wood-cutter.

People with the surname Woodger include:

- George Woodger (1883–1961), English international footballer
- Joseph Henry Woodger (1894–1981), British theoretical biologist and philosopher of biology
- Mike Woodger (1923–2025), English computer pioneer
- William George Woodger (1887–1979), Australian stock-and-station agent and auctioneer
