= Thomas Wills =

Thomas or Tom Wills may refer to:

- Thomas Wills (minister) (1740–1802), English evangelical preacher
- Thomas Wills (politician) (1826–1907), politician from Ontario, Canada
- Thomas N. Wills (1866–1940), Arizona rancher and politician
- Thomas Wills (footballer) (1877–1912), Scottish footballer
- Tom Wills (1835–1880), cricketer and one of the inventors of Australian rules football
- Tom Wills, meteorologist with WAVE
- Tom Wills, news anchor with Florida television station WJXT
- Tom Wills Interchange, an interchange on the Eastlink M3 in Melbourne, Australia
- Tom Wills (singer), UK singer

== See also ==
- Thomas Willis (disambiguation)
