= Herbert Swan =

Herbert Swan may refer to:

- Herbert Swan (Australian politician), member of the Legislative Assembly of Western Australia
- Herbert Swan (Canadian politician), Speaker of the Legislative Assembly of Saskatchewan

== See also ==
- Herbert Swann, English footballer
