= 1918–19 Manchester United F.C. season =

English football club season

Manchester United
1918–19 season
- Chairman: John Henry Davies
- Manager: Jack Robson
- Principal Tournament: 9th
- Subsidiary Tournament Group C: 3rd
Home colours	Away colours

The 1918–19 season was Manchester United's fourth and final season in the non-competitive War League during the First World War.

With the ongoing First World War, once again Manchester United played non-competitive war league football. In the principal tournament they contested the Lancashire Section, in a 30-game season. In the subsidiary tournament they contested Group C of the Lancashire Section, in a group of four teams. However, none of these were considered to be competitive football, and thus their records are not recognised by the Football League.

== Lancashire Section Principal Tournament ==
Date	Opponents	H / A	Result F–A	Scorers	Attendance
7 September 1918	Oldham Athletic	H	1–4		
14 September 1918	Oldham Athletic	A	2–0		
21 September 1918	Blackburn Rovers	H	1–0		
28 September 1918	Blackburn Rovers	A	1–1		
5 October 1918	Manchester City	H	0–2		
12 October 1918	Manchester City	A	0–0		
19 October 1918	Everton	H	1–1		
26 October 1918	Everton	A	2–6		
2 November 1918	Rochdale	H	3–1		
9 November 1918	Rochdale	A	0–1		
16 November 1918	Preston North End	A	2–4		
23 November 1918	Preston North End	H	1–2		
30 November 1918	Bolton Wanderers	A	1–3		
7 December 1918	Bolton Wanderers	H	1–0		
14 December 1918	Port Vale	A	1–3		
21 December 1918	Port Vale	H	5–1		
28 December 1918	Blackpool	A	2–2		
11 January 1919	Stockport County	A	1–2		
18 January 1919	Stockport County	H	0–2		
25 January 1919	Liverpool	A	1–1		
1 February 1919	Liverpool	H	0–1		
8 February 1919	Southport Vulcan	A	1–2		
15 February 1919	Southport Vulcan	H	1–3		
22 February 1919	Burnley	A	2–4		
1 March 1919	Burnley	H	4–0		
8 March 1919	Stoke	A	2–1		
15 March 1919	Stoke	H	3–1		
23 March 1919	Bury	A	2–0		
29 March 1919	Bury	H	5–1		
30 April 1919	Blackpool	H	5–1		

Pos	Team	Pld	W	D	L	GF	GA	GAv	Pts
8	Stockport County	30	11	7	12	48	52	0.923	29
9	Manchester United	30	11	5	14	51	50	1.020	27
10	Rochdale	30	11	5	14	56	61	0.918	27

== Lancashire Section Subsidiary Tournament Group C ==
Date	Opponents	H / A	Result F–A	Scorers	Attendance
5 April 1919	Port Vale	A	3–1		
12 April 1919	Port Vale	H	2–1		
18 April 1919	Manchester City	A	0–3		
19 April 1919	Stoke	H	0–1		
21 April 1919	Manchester City	H	2–4		
26 April 1919	Stoke	A	2–4		

Pos	Team	Pld	W	D	L	GF	GA	GAv	Pts
1	Manchester City	6	5	1	0	14	4	3.500	11
2	Stoke	6	2	2	2	9	10	0.900	6
3	Manchester United	6	2	0	4	9	14	0.643	4
4	Port Vale	6	1	1	4	9	13	0.692	3
