= Southern United F.C. =

Southern United F.C. may refer to:

- Southern United F.C. (England), football club in England
- Southern United F.C. (Solomon Islands), football club in the Solomon Islands
- Southern United FC, football club in New Zealand
