= Thomas Willis (disambiguation) =

Thomas Willis (1621–1675) was an English physician and anatomist.

Thomas Willis may also refer to:

- Thomas Willis (Clerk of the Crown in Chancery) (1576–1656), high-ranking official during the English Civil War
- Thomas H. Willis (1850–1925), American painter
- Tom Willis (soccer) (born 1983), Australian goalkeeper
- Tom Willis (rugby union, born 1979), New Zealand rugby union player
- Tom Willis (rugby union, born 1999), England rugby union player
- Thomas Willis (sailor) (1756–1797), sailor with the second voyage of James Cook
- Tom Willis (politician), member of the West Virginia Senate
- Tom Willis (The Jeffersons), character in the American sitcom The Jeffersons

== See also ==
- Thomas Willys, MP
- Thomas Wills (disambiguation)
