= William Weston (footballer) =

English footballer

Personal information
- Full name: William Weston
- Date of birth: 1882
- Place of birth: Southwick, Northamptonshire
- Date of death: 1948 (aged 65–66)
- Position: Inside forward

Senior career*
Years	Team	Apps	(Gls)
1905–1906	Sunderland	0	(0)
1906–1907	Crystal Palace	6	(1)
1907–1909	Blackpool	46	(9)
1909	Nelson		
1909–19??	Spennymoor United		
Total		52+	(10+)
- * Club domestic league appearances and goals

William Weston (1882–1948) was an English professional footballer who played as an inside forward. He joined Crystal Palace from Sunderland in 1906. He moved on to Blackpool the following year.

== Career statistics ==
Appearances and goals by club, season and competition
Club	Season	League			FA Cup		Total	
Club	Season	Division	Apps	Goals	Apps	Goals	Apps	Goals
Sunderland	1905–06	Second Division	0	0	0	0	0	0
Crystal Palace	1906–07	Southern League Division One	6	1	0	0	6	1
Blackpool	1907–08	Second Division	27	5	1	0	28	5
Blackpool	1908–09	Second Division	19	4	1	1	20	5
Blackpool	Total		46	9	2	1	48	10
