= William George Woodger =

William George Woodger (12 December 1887 – 25 January 1979) was an Australian army officer, auctioneer, real estate agent, soldier and stock and station agent. Woodger was born in Garryowen and died in Lane Cove.

== See also ==
- Leslie Joseph Hooker
