= Isaac Owens =

English footballer (1881–1916)

Personal information
- Full name: Isaac Owens
- Date of birth: 1881
- Place of birth: Howden-le-Wear, England
- Date of death: 1916 (aged 35)
- Place of death: Devonport, England
- Height: 5 ft 10 1/2 in (1.79 m)
- Positions: Inside left; centre forward

Senior career*
Years	Team	Apps	(Gls)
–	Darlington		
1???–1901	Bishop Auckland		
1901	Crook Town		
1901–1902	Woolwich Arsenal (Note: For consistency, the infobox statistics for Woolwich Arsenal, Plymouth Argyle, Bristol Rovers and Crystal Palace only include appearances and goals in each club's main league – the Football League for Woolwich Arsenal and the Southern League for the other three – so appearances and goals in the London League, Western League, or any other secondary league competition are excluded.)	9	(2)
1903–1904	Darlington		
1904–1906	Plymouth Argyle	25	(4)
1906–1907	Bristol Rovers	17	(6)
1907–1908	Crystal Palace	22	(8)
1908–1909	Grimsby Town	6	(3)
1909–19??	Darlington		(15)
- * Club domestic league appearances and goals

Isaac Owens (1881–1916) was an English footballer who played as an inside left or centre forward in the Football League for Woolwich Arsenal and Grimsby Town. He also played non-league football for Darlington (in three separate spells), Bishop Auckland, Crook Town, Plymouth Argyle, Bristol Rovers and Crystal Palace.

== Life and career ==
Owens was born in Howden-le-Wear, County Durham, in 1881. He began his football career with Darlington of the Northern League and then joined Bishop Auckland. He contributed to Bishops winning the 1900–01 Northern League title, and played for them in the first Champions versus Rest of the League fixture, before moving on to another Northern League team, FA Amateur Cup-holders Crook Town. His stay there was brief: in October 1901 he signed for Football League Second Division club Woolwich Arsenal.

Owens made his debut in the Football League away to Gainsborough Trinity on 12 October; playing at inside left, he scored one of the goals in a 2–2 draw. He was not selected for the next match, but returned to the side for the one after, in the London League, and retained the inside-left position for twelve competitive matches, scoring once more, in a 2–0 win at home to Newton Heath. He also scored on his last senior Arsenal appearance, playing at outside left in a London League match against Queens Park Rangers. When not required for first-team matches, Owens contributed to Arsenal's junior teams winning the London League Reserve Championship and West Kent League titles.

Owens returned to Darlington, playing for them in the Northern League and 1903–04 FA Cup – he contributed the winner against Shildon in the preliminary round replay and two goals in a 5–2 defeat of Bishop Auckland in the second qualifying round – and then, in May 1904, he signed for Plymouth Argyle of the Southern League.

His first appearance for Argyle came on 12 October in a Western League match at home to Queens Park Rangers. He played his first Southern League match some six weeks later, and scored his first goals on 10 December, contributing both Argyle goals in a 2–2 draw at home to Northampton Town in the Southern League. Assessing his performance in a friendly match against First Division club West Bromwich Albion, the Daily Express reporter described him as "essentially a trier, by no means lacking in dash or the finer points of the game." In the 1904–05 season, Owens was used as backup to centre-forward Jasper McLuckie, and finished the season with four goals from 13 league appearances. With the arrival of Harry Wilcox ahead of the 1905–06 season, Owens' chances of first-team football appeared limited, but he had a run in the team when Wilcox was used at centre half, and ended up making 28 appearances from which he scored seven goals.

In 1906, Owens signed for another Southern League club, Bristol Rovers; he had played against them several times – and scored against them – for Plymouth Argyle. He returned the favour in January 1907, with the first goal of a 2–0 win against Argyle, but was unable to establish himself as a first-team regular, and finished the season with six goals from 17 Southern League appearances. He spent the 1907–08 season with Crystal Palace, for whom he appeared at half back as well as in the forward line. He scored eight goals from 22 Southern League matches, and then returned to the Football League with Grimsby Town. Despite scoring on his debut, against Stockport County on the opening day of the season, and adding two more goals from just five more Second Division matches, he was rated "disappointing and lacking pace", and by February 1909 he was back at Darlington. He scored 15 goals between then and the end of the season, including a run of at least one goal in each of the eight North-Eastern League matches in February and March, and scored in the 1909–10 FA Cup in a 2–0 defeat of Horden Athletic.

Owens died in Devonport, Devon, in 1916 at the age of 35.
