= Stan Cubberley =

English footballer

Personal information
- Full name: Stanley Morris Cubberley
- Date of birth: 18 July 1882
- Place of birth: Edmonton, London, England
- Date of death: 1933 (aged 50–51)
- Position: Wing half

Senior career*
Years	Team	Apps	(Gls)
1902–1903	Enfield		
1903–1904	Cheshunt		
1904–1905	Asplin Rovers		
1905–1906	Crystal Palace		
1906–1913	Leeds City	181	(6)
1913–1914	Swansea Town		
1914–1915	Manchester United	0	(0)
Total		181	(6)
- * Club domestic league appearances and goals

Stanley Morris Cubberley (18 July 1882–1933) was an English footballer who played in the Football League for Leeds City.
