= Dick Harker =

English footballer

Personal information
- Full name: Richard Harker
- Date of birth: 20 May 1883
- Place of birth: Wardley Colliery, Gateshead, England
- Date of death: 9 April 1917 (aged 33)
- Place of death: Arras, France
- Position: Inside forward

Senior career*
Years	Team	Apps	(Gls)
1904–1905	Newcastle United	0	(0)
1905–1907	Crystal Palace	51	(12)
1907–1909	Hibernian	68	(29)
1909–1911	Heart of Midlothian	67	(20)
1911–1912	Crystal Palace	15	(7)
1912–1914	Darlington	52	(22)
- * Club domestic league appearances and goals

Richard Harker (20 May 1883 – 9 April 1917) was an English professional footballer who played for Newcastle United, Crystal Palace, Hibernian, Heart of Midlothian and Darlington.

== Playing career ==
Harker signed amateur terms with Newcastle United in 1903 after a trial, and turned professional in 1904, appearing for Newcastle reserves in a championship winning season in the Northern League. During this season Harker scored 16 goals in 17 games. In 1905 he transferred to the new Crystal Palace F.C. where he was one of the 16 players manager John Robson brought from the North East. At Palace he played inside right and featured in their debut fixtures, although he failed to finish the first match the club played in the Southern League against Southampton Reserves due to an injury. He played in the F.A. Cup defeat of Newcastle United in 1907, featuring in Palace's cup run that season. After transferring to Hibernian for the 1907–1908 season he finished his first season as their top scorer. After moving to Heart of Midlothian he was their top scorer for the 1910–1911 season. In his second spell at Palace he scored a hat-trick against West Ham in a 6–1 victory on 30 September 1911. He won the North Eastern League with Darlington in 1913.

== Death ==
He enlisted at the outbreak of the First World War, serving in the Northumberland Fusiliers where he was ultimately part of the 20th Tyneside Scottish Battalion. He was listed as killed in action in the Battle of Arras on 9 April 1917 in France. Having no known grave, he is commemorated on the Arras Memorial.

He was one of the eight former Palace players killed during the war memorialised by the club in November 2018, planting eight saplings at their Beckenham training ground.
