= Peterborough City F.C. =

Peterborough City
- Full name: Peterborough City Football Club
- Nickname(s): the City
- Founded: 1906
- Dissolved: 1916
- Ground: Midland Road
Home colours

Peterborough City F.C. was an English football club based in Peterborough, Cambridgeshire.

== History ==
The club was founded in 1906, and at its first annual general meeting reported a profit of just over £3 on a turnover of £310; the total weekly player wage was £3 per week. It played one season in the Southern League, in 1909–10.

It entered the FA Cup a number of times in the 1910s; it reached fourth qualifying round - one before the main draw, and the equivalent of the second round in 2024–25 - three times, but never made the main draw.

The club was struggling for finance in 1914, and had to withdraw from the Eastern League to join the Central Alliance. The effects of the First World War caused the club to disband in 1916.

A new club, with the same name and colours, playing at the White Hart ground in New England, was founded in 1923, and it took part in the 1923–24 FA Cup and Northants League. However it disbanded in November 1923, failing to attract support in the shadow of Peterborough & Fletton United.

== Colours ==
The club wore amber and black jerseys with white knickers and black socks.

== Ground ==
The club originally played at the Old Town Cricket Ground, later moving to Midland Road.

== See also ==
- Peterborough City F.C. players
