= Tom Wills (singer) =

UK singer-songwriter

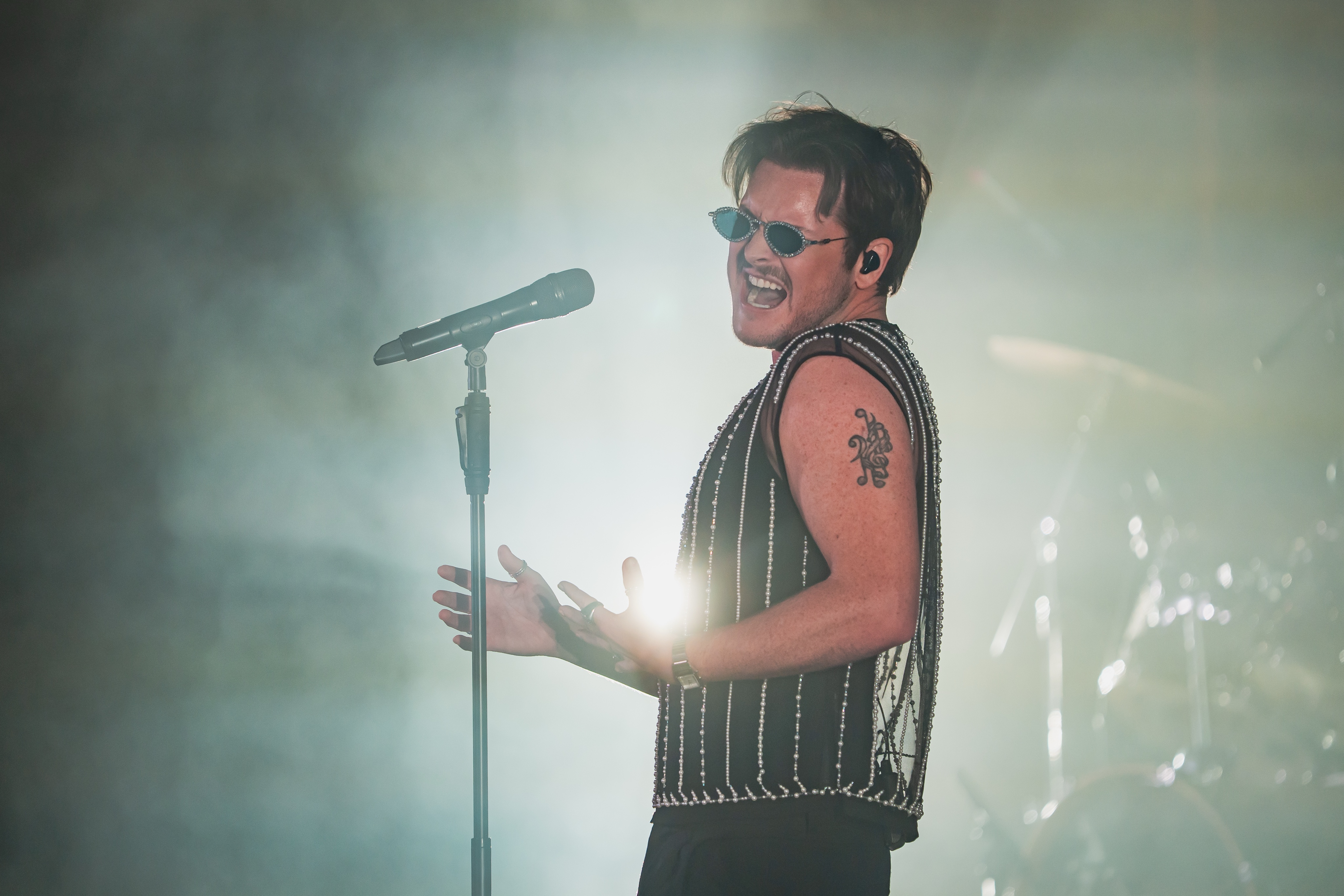
- Tom Wills performing live in Manchester, 2025

Background information
- Born: August 28, 1998 (age 28)
- Origin: Manchester, England
- Genres: Dance-pop, House music
- Occupations: Singer, songwriter
- Years active: 2020–present
- Label: The Dance Division
- Website: www.tom-wills.com

Tom Wills is a UK singer and songwriter who releases dance-pop and house music. His work has charted on UK and international digital music charts and has received coverage from UK and international music publications.

In 2025, Wills signed to the Sweden-based record label The Dance Division and released the EP Mid-Night Moves in collaboration with producer Sholz-Y.

The title track entered the German Dance-Charts Top 100, peaking at number 19, and reached number 5 on the GSA Commercial House Chart, while the EP reached number 4 on the UK iTunes Dance Chart and number 40 on the UK iTunes All Genres Chart.

== Early life ==
Wills was born in Chorley, Lancashire, and is now based in Manchester, England.

== Career ==
Wills began releasing original music in the early 2020s, focusing on dance-pop and house music styles. His singles received support through BBC Music Introducing on BBC Radio.

In 2026, Wills released the single "Laid". The single received coverage from regional UK press including Lancashire Post, Lancashire Telegraph, Bolton News, Bury Times, and Oldham Times, alongside music publications including RGM, We Write About Music, KIMU, and Rotate Magazine.

Wills has performed at Pride events across the United Kingdom and has been involved with community-focused LGBTQ+ initiatives.

== Discography ==
=== EPs ===
- Mid-Night Moves (with Sholz-Y)

=== Singles ===
- "Let Me Go"
- "Feel the Same"
- "Mid-Night Moves" (with Sholz-Y)
- "Laid"
