= Fred Lewis (footballer, born 1886) =

English footballer

Personal information
- Full name: Fredrick Lewis
- Date of birth: 1886
- Place of birth: Birmingham, England
- Date of death: 1949 (aged 63)
- Place of death: Stoke-on-Trent, England
- Position: Defender

Senior career*
Years	Team	Apps	(Gls)
	West Bromwich Albion	0	(0)
1909–1910	Stoke	2	(0)
- Cradley Heath St Luke's
–	Dudley Town		
–	Brierley Hill Alliance		
- * Club domestic league appearances and goals

Fredrick Lewis (1886–1949) was an English footballer who played for Stoke.

== Career ==
Owen was born in Stoke-upon-Trent and played for West Bromwich Albion before joining Stoke in 1909. He played in two matches during the 1909–10 season before entering amateur football with Cradley Heath St Luke's, Dudley Town and Brierley Hill Alliance.

== Career statistics ==
Appearances and goals by club, season and competition
Club	Season	League		FA Cup		Total	
Club	Season	Apps	Goals	Apps	Goals	Apps	Goals
Stoke	1909–10	2	0	0	0	2	0
Career total		2	0	0	0	2	0
