= Joshua Johnson (footballer, born 1884) =

English footballer

Personal information
- Date of birth: 1884
- Place of birth: Tibshelf, Derbyshire, England
- Position: Goalkeeper

Youth career
- ?–1905: Ripley Athletic

Senior career*
Years	Team	Apps	(Gls)
1905–1906	Aston Villa	0	(0)
1906–1907	Plymouth Argyle	7	(0)
1907–1919	Crystal Palace	276	(0)
1919–1921	Nottingham Forest		
1921–?	Sutton United		

International career
	Southern League XI	3	(0)
- * Club domestic league appearances and goals

Joshua Johnson (born 1884; date of death unknown) was an English football goalkeeper who played in the Football League for Nottingham Forest and in the Southern League for Crystal Palace and Plymouth Argyle. Outside football, Johnson was a lay preacher.

== Career ==
Johnson was born in Tibshelf, Derbyshire and began his career with local club Ripley Athletic. He signed for Aston Villa, in 1905, but moved on to Plymouth Argyle in 1906, without making a senior appearance. Johnson spent one season at Plymouth (7 appearances) before signing for Crystal Palace in November 1907. He went on to make 276 appearances for Palace in the Southern League up until the start of World War I. In 1919, he moved on to Nottingham Forest, then of the Football League second division, where he made 53 appearances in all competitions over the following two seasons. He then ended his career with Sutton United. During his time with Palace, Johnson represented the Southern League on three occasions.
