= Jimmy Bauchop =

Scottish footballer (1886–1948)

Personal information
- Full name: James Rae Bauchop
- Date of birth: 22 May 1886
- Place of birth: Sauchie, Scotland
- Date of death: 13 June 1948 (aged 62)
- Place of death: Bradford, England
- Position: Forward

Senior career*
Years	Team	Apps	(Gls)
	Alloa Athletic	?	(?)
1906–1909	Celtic	14	(5)
	Norwich City	?	(?)
1908–1909	Crystal Palace	43	(23)
1909–1912	Derby County	126	(68)
1913	Tottenham Hotspur	10	(6)
1913–1921	Bradford Park Avenue	157	(67)
1922–1923	Doncaster Rovers		(2)
1923	Lincoln City	28	(11)
- * Club domestic league appearances and goals

James Rae Bauchop (22 May 1886 in Sauchie – 13 June 1948 Bradford) was a professional footballer who played as a forward for Alloa Athletic, Celtic, Norwich City, Crystal Palace, Derby County, Tottenham Hotspur, Bradford Park Avenue, Doncaster Rovers and Lincoln City.

== Football career ==
Bauchop began his career at Alloa Athletic before playing for Glasgow Celtic where he was member of the club's Championship winning sides of 1905–06 and 1906–07.

Bauchop later played for Norwich City before moving to Crystal Palace early in 1908. He made his debut on 21 March in the home derby against Millwall, scoring the second in a 2–0 victory. He would make 47 appearances for the club in both the Southern League and the FA Cup, scoring 26 goals. He scored one hat-trick for the club, in a home game against Portsmouth on 24 October 1908. He also became the first Palace player to be sent off, in a London Challenge Cup tie against Croydon Common on 9 September 1908.

In 1909 he joined Derby County where he featured in 126 matches and scoring 68 goals between 1909 and 1912.

Bauchop signed for Tottenham Hotspur in 1913. He scored twice on his Lilywhites debut in a 4–1 victory over Sheffield United at Bramall Lane in September 1913 in the old First Division. Jimmy played in 10 matches and found the net on six occasions for the Spurs.

In 1913 he moved on to Bradford Park Avenue and participated in 157 games and found the net 67 times.

Bauchop went on to play for Doncaster Rovers where he scored 3 League and FA Cup goals. His debut was in the first game at Rovers' new ground Low Pastures, which was to become known as Belle Vue, in front of what was then Doncaster's highest ever home crowd of around 10,000.

He then ended his career at Lincoln City where he played a further 28 games, scoring 11 goals.

Bauchop died on 13 June 1948, in Bradford, England.

== Honours ==
Celtic

- Scottish Football League First Division: Winners 1905–06, 1906–07
