= Thomas Wills (footballer) =

Scottish footballer

Personal information
- Full name: Thomas Guthrie Wills
- Date of birth: 15 October 1877
- Place of birth: Ayr, Scotland
- Date of death: 1929 (aged 50–51)
- Position: Full-back

Senior career*
Years	Team	Apps	(Gls)
1902–1903	Ayr		
1903–1905	Newcastle United	18	(0)
1906–1907	Crystal Palace	17	(0)
1907–1908	Ayr		
1908–1911	Carlisle United		
1911	Johannesburg		
Total		18	(0)
- * Club domestic league appearances and goals

Thomas Guthrie Wills (15 October 1877 – 1912) was a Scottish footballer who played in the Football League for Newcastle United.
