= Harry Collyer =

English footballer

Personal information
- Date of birth: c. 1885
- Place of birth: Bromley, England
- Position: Full back

Senior career*
Years	Team	Apps	(Gls)
- Catford Southend
1906–1915	Crystal Palace	263	(1)
- Ramsgate
- * Club domestic league appearances and goals

Harold W. "Harry" Collyer (born c. 1885) was an English footballer who played for Crystal Palace as a full back.

== Career ==
Collyer joined Palace in 1906, the club's second season and their first in the Southern League First Division. He made his debut on Boxing Day away to Watford, and initially played as a left back. However, he quickly switched to right back and established himself in the team, remaining at the club until the outbreak of World War I. Described by former Palace chaplain Reverend Nigel Sands as "a tough, sturdy, strong, muscular full-back with a giant-sized heart", Collyer was the first Palace player to earn a testimonial match, the 1912 home match against Coventry City. Collyer made 263 Southern League appearances for the club, and a further 18 in the FA Cup, totalling 281 outings at Palace, netting just one goal. By the time of the First World War, Collyer was the longest serving player at the club, his total not beaten until Albert Harry in the 1930s.
