= Charles Ryan (footballer) =

English footballer (1883–1962)

Personal information
- Full name: Charles William Ryan
- Date of birth: 1883
- Place of birth: Camberwell, England
- Date of death: 24 January 1962 (aged 78–79)
- Place of death: Harlesden, England
- Height: 5 ft 5 in (1.65 m)
- Position: Half back

Senior career*
Years	Team	Apps	(Gls)
1897–?	Nunhead		
?–?	Hitchin		
?–?	Ilford		
?–1906	Nunhead		
1906–1909	Crystal Palace	82	(2)
1909–1910	Croydon Common	34	(2)
1910–1911	Peterborough City		
1911–?	Peterborough GN Loco		
Total		124	(4)
- * Club domestic league appearances and goals

Charles William Ryan (1883 – 24 January 1962) was an English professional footballer, who played as a half back for Crystal Palace and Croydon Common.

== Career ==
Ryan had a long career in non-league football, initially playing for Nunhead when only thirteen or fourteen, moving to Hitchin and then Ilford before a return to Nunhead. Ryan signed professionally for Crystal Palace in 1906, joining the club in their second season, appearing as a half back. Ryan played for Palace in the club's shock defeat of Newcastle in the first round of the 1906–07 FA Cup. Ryan left Palace for Croydon Common in 1909. After Croydon Common he returned to non-league with stints at Peterborough City and Peterborough GN Loco.
