= Wilf Innerd =

English footballer (1878–1967)

Personal information
- Full name: Wilfred Innerd
- Date of birth: 1878
- Place of birth: Newcastle upon Tyne, England
- Date of death: 24 June 1967 (aged 88–89)
- Place of death: Newcastle upon Tyne, England
- Height: 5 ft 9 in (1.75 m)
- Position: Half back

Senior career*
Years	Team	Apps	(Gls)
1899–1900	Wallsend Park Villa	?	
1900–1905	Newcastle United	3	(0)
1905–1909	Crystal Palace	111	(4)
1909–1910	Shildon Athletic	?	(?)
1910–19??	Newcastle City	?	(?)
- * Club domestic league appearances and goals

Wilfred Innerd (1878 – 24 June 1967) was a professional footballer who played for Wallsend Park Villa, Newcastle United, Crystal Palace, Shildon Athletic and Newcastle City.

He signed for Newcastle United from Wallsend Park Villa in May 1900. Innerd found it hard to break into the Newcastle side, which was the pre-eminent team of the era, and played mainly for the reserve team, Newcastle United 'A's. He made only three appearances in the first team, two in 1901 and a final appearance in 1905. At the end of the 1905 season Innerd signed for Crystal Palace and took over as captain from Ted Birnie in 1906. He captained the club during their shock FA Cup win over Newcastle in 1907. Innerd was a regular in the side until he was badly injured in a January 1909 FA Cup match against Wolverhampton Wanderers which curtailed his Palace career.
