= Southern United F.C. (England) =

Southern United
- Full name: Southern United Football Club
- Nickname(s): Southrons
- Founded: 1904
- Dissolved: 1907
- Ground: Brown's Ground, Nunhead

Southern United Football Club was a football club based in the Nunhead area of London, England.

== History ==
The club was established in 1904 by former West Norwood officials Baron William von Reiffenstein and William Hooton. Playing in black and mauve hooped shirts with black shorts and socks and comprising a mixture of amateur and professional players, the club became members of the Football Association but were unable to join the Surrey Football Association as it would not accept professional members.

The club joined the South-Eastern League for the 1904–05 season. A difficult first season saw the club fail to field eleven players on several occasions and a deduction of two points for signing C.W. Ryan who was registered with Hitchin Town. As a result, they finished bottom of the table in their first season in the league. Despite the club's problems, they invested heavily in players, signing former England international Fred Spiksley and entering teams into Division Two of the Southern League, Division One of the London League and the United League for the 1905–06 season, with a reserve team playing in the South-Eastern League. Difficulties continued and the club were censured by the Southern League after arriving so late for a match at Sittingbourne that most of the crowd had gone home. They were suspended from footballing activity in April 1906 due to debts, and although the suspension was subsequently lifted, the Football Association created a commission to investigate the club. The commission banned the club secretary and suspended the club again until debts were cleared.

Southern United managed to start the 1906–07 season, playing their first game a week after the rest of the league due to the suspension still being in place. They were suspended again in October due to more unpaid debts, but the suspension was lifted after the debts were paid off. In January von Reiffenstein was censured by the FA after they ruled that Deptford Invicta were illegally acting as the reserve team for Southern United. Another investigation was launched that month, and after the FA ordered club officials to attend a meeting, von Reiffenstein reacted by dissolving the club. As a result, their record in each of their three leagues was expunged. They had lost all eleven matches played in the Southern League.

== Ground ==
Southern United played at Brown's Ground in Nunhead. Following Southern United folding, the ground was used by Nunhead.

== See also ==
- Southern United F.C. players
