= Ted Birnie =

English footballer (1878–1935)

Personal information
- Full name: Edward Lawson Birnie
- Date of birth: 25 August 1878
- Place of birth: Sunderland, England
- Date of death: 21 December 1935 (aged 57)
- Place of death: Westcliff-on-Sea, Essex, England
- Position: Centre half

Senior career*
Years	Team	Apps	(Gls)
1898–1903	Newcastle United	19	(0)
1905–1906	Crystal Palace	22	(0)
1906–1909	Chelsea	101	(3)
1910	Tottenham Hotspur	4	(1)
Total		146	(4)

Managerial career
- 1922–1934: Southend United
- * Club domestic league appearances and goals

Edward Lawson Birnie (25 August 1878 – 21 December 1935) was an English professional football player and manager. He played for Sunderland Seaburn, Newcastle United, Crystal Palace, Chelsea and Tottenham Hotspur In his managerial career, he took on the reins at Southend United, staying in charge of the seaside club until his retirement in 1934.

== Playing career ==
Born in Sunderland, Birnie began his career at local club Sunderland Seaburn before joining Newcastle United. The commanding centre half played in 19 matches between 1898 and 1903. Birnie went on to play for Crystal Palace where he featured in 29 matches in all competitions (22 league). In August 1906 he joined Chelsea, making his debut on 8 September 1906 in a 0–0 draw away at Blackpool. Birnie participated in 108 games in all competitions and scored on three occasions for the Stamford Bridge club. After Chelsea decided against renewing his contract, Tottenham Hotspur signed him in 1910, playing in four matches and scoring a single goal at White Hart Lane.

== Coaching and managerial career ==
After his playing career had ended, Birnie joined German club 1. FC Mülheim as a coach. He then had spells as a trainer at Sunderland and Rochdale. In 1922 he became manager of Southend United and spent 12 seasons in charge of the club, becoming the only manager to preside over a Southend team for more than 500 matches (April 2009). Birnie retired in May 1934, but would be beset with ill-health and died in December 1935 aged 57.

== Managerial statistics ==
Team	Nat	From	To	Record				
Team	Nat	From	To	G	W	D	L	Win %
Southend United	(England)	1921	1934	571	218	118	235	38.18
Total				571	218	118	235	38.18
