= Billy Davies (Welsh footballer) =

Welsh footballer

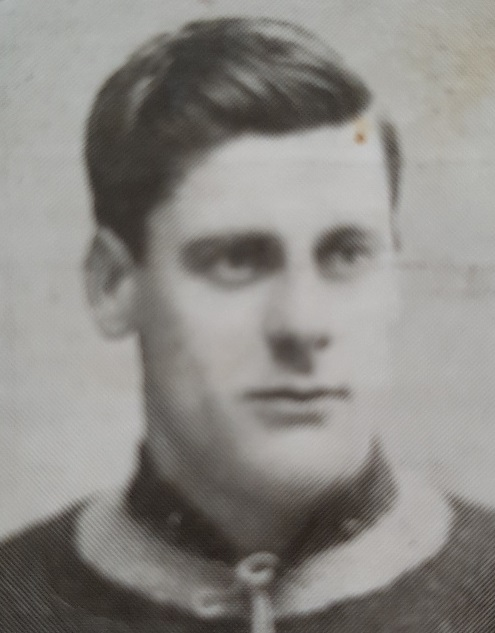
- Davies with Crystal Palace in 1914.

Personal information
- Full name: William Charles Davies
- Date of birth: 28 February 1881
- Place of birth: Newtown, Wales
- Date of death: 18 August 1962 (aged 81)
- Position: Outside forward

Senior career*
Years	Team	Apps	(Gls)
1900	Rhayader		
1901	Llandrindod		
1902	Knighton		
1903–1905	Shrewsbury Town		
1905–1907	Stoke	16	(1)
1907–1908	Crystal Palace	32	(3)
1908–1910	West Bromwich Albion	53	(4)
1910–1915	Crystal Palace	173	(23)
Total		277	(28)

International career
1908–1914	Wales	4	(0)
- * Club domestic league appearances and goals

William Charles Davies (28 February 1881 – 18 August 1962) was a Welsh international footballer who played as an outside forward for Crystal Palace, Shrewsbury Town, Stoke, West Bromwich Albion and the Wales national team.

== Career ==
Davies was born in Newtown and played for Rhayader, Llandrindod, Knighton and Shrewsbury Town before he joined Stoke in 1905. He played 17 times for Stoke in two seasons scoring once against Preston North End on the final day of the 1906–07 which saw Stoke suffer relegation. He then spent a season with Crystal Palace before playing over 50 matches for West Bromwich Albion. He returned to Palace in 1910 and went on to play 162 times in five years.

He was capped on four occasions by the Wales national football team. His first cap came in March 1908 when he became Crystal Palace's first current international player.

== Career statistics ==
=== Club ===
Appearances and goals by club, season and competition
Club	Season	League			FA Cup		Total	
Club	Season	Division	Apps	Goals	Apps	Goals	Apps	Goals
Stoke	1905–06	First Division	4	0	0	0	4	0
Stoke	1906–07	First Division	12	1	1	0	13	1
Crystal Palace	1907–08	Southern League	35	4	0	0	35	4
West Bromwich Albion	1908–09	Second Division	33	3	2	0	35	3
West Bromwich Albion	1909–10	Second Division	20	1	1	0	21	1
Crystal Palace	1910–11	Southern League	32	3	0	0	32	3
Crystal Palace	1911–12	Southern League	35	6	0	0	35	6
Crystal Palace	1912–13	Southern League	37	3	0	0	37	3
Crystal Palace	1913–14	Southern League	35	5	0	0	35	5
Crystal Palace	1914–15	Southern League	34	2	0	0	34	2
Crystal Palace	Total		173	19	0	0	173	19
Career Total			277	28	4	0	281	28

=== International ===
National team	Year	Apps	Goals
Wales	1908	1	0
Wales	1909	1	0
Wales	1910	1	0
Wales	1914	1	0
Total		4	0
