= Bill Forster (footballer) =

English footballer (1879–1962)

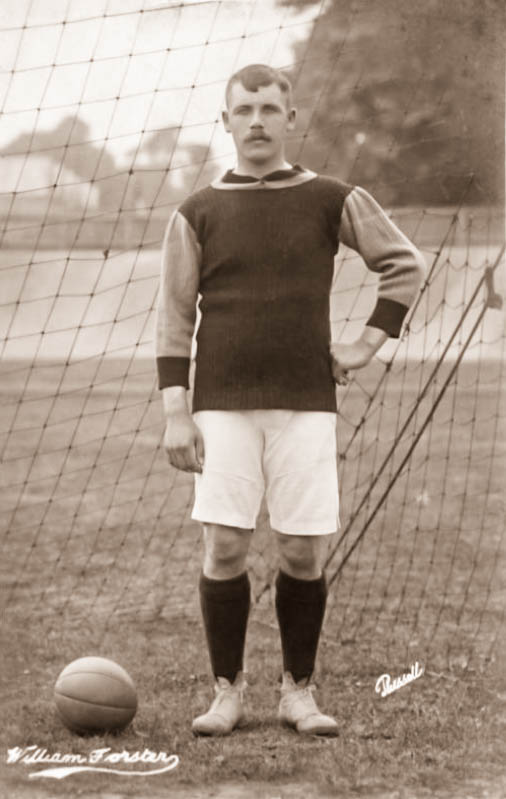

Personal information
- Full name: William Allison Forster
- Date of birth: 1879
- Place of birth: Danesmoor, Chesterfield.
- Date of death: 28 October 1962 (aged 82–83)
- Place of death: Clay Lane, Clay Cross, Derbyshire.

Senior career*
Years	Team	Apps	(Gls)
1902-1906	Sheffield United		
1906–1908	Crystal Palace	50	(0)
1908-	Grimsby Town		
- * Club domestic league appearances and goals

William Allison Forster (1879 – 28 October 1962) was an English professional footballer, who played for Sheffield United, Crystal Palace and Grimsby Town.

== Career ==
Forster played professionally for Sheffield United, before signing for Crystal Palace in 1906. Forster played for Palace in the club's shock defeat of Newcastle in the first round of the 1906–07 FA Cup. Forster left Palace for Grimsby Town in 1908.
