= Bob Hewitson =

English footballer

Personal information
- Full name: Robert Hewitson
- Date of birth: 26 February 1884
- Place of birth: Blyth, Northumberland, England
- Date of death: 1957 (aged 72–73)
- Place of death: Northumberland
- Position: Goalkeeper

Senior career*
Years	Team	Apps	(Gls)
	Morpeth Harriers	?	
1903–1904	Barnsley	62	
1905–1907	Crystal Palace	60	
1907	Oldham Athletic	27	
1908–1909	Tottenham Hotspur	30	
	Croydon Common	?	
	Doncaster Rovers	?	
- * Club domestic league appearances and goals

Robert Hewitson (26 February 1884 – 1957) was an English professional footballer who played for Morpeth Harriers, Barnsley, Crystal Palace, Oldham Athletic, Tottenham Hotspur, Croydon Common and Doncaster Rovers.

== Football career ==
Hewitson began his playing career at Morpeth Harriers before joining Barnsley in 1903, the goalkeeper played a total of 62 matches between 1903 and 1904. Hewitson moved on to Crystal Palace where he featured in 75 matches in all competitions. In 1907 he signed for Oldham Athletic before joining Tottenham Hotspur in June 1908. Hewitson debut was also Tottenham's first ever Football League game which was a 3–0 home win over Wolverhampton Wanderers. He went on to participate in a further 34 matches in the league and FA Cup.

After leaving White Hart Lane he played for Croydon Common and finally Doncaster Rovers.

== Works cited ==
- Goodwin, Bob (1992). The Spurs Alphabet. ACL & Polar Publishing (UK) Ltd. ISBN 0-9514862-8-4.
