= Edmund Goodman =

English football manager (1873–1960)

- Goodman circa 1908

Personal information
- Date of birth: 8 October 1873
- Place of birth: Birmingham, England
- Date of death: 1960 (aged 86–87)
- Place of death: Bromley, England

Managerial career
- Years: Team
- 1907–1925: Crystal Palace

Edmund Goodman (8 October 1873 – 1960) was an English football manager. He had his playing career at Aston Villa cut short by an injury, sustained playing for the reserves, which meant he had to have his leg amputated. After this, he became assistant secretary at Villa. When Crystal Palace F.C. were formed as a professional outfit in 1905, they asked Villa for help in setting up the club. The West Midlands club offered Goodman to Palace and he helped to appoint their first manager and also chairman. After two seasons, he took over as manager and remained so for 18 years, becoming Palace's longest serving manager in the process.

Under Goodman's management, Palace were the runners up in the Southern League in 1914, behind Swindon Town on goal-average, and won the inaugural Football League Third Division title in 1920–21. Palace were relegated from the Second Division in 1925 and in November that year, the club's directors "recognised that the dual duties of secretary and manager had become too onerous" and appointed Alex Maley as team manager with Goodman returning to his original position of club secretary. Goodman retired in 1933 and ran a grocery shop in nearby Anerley, South London.
