= Herbert Swann =

English footballer (1882–1954)

Personal information
- Full name: Herbert Swann
- Date of birth: 28 March 1882
- Place of birth: Lytham, England
- Date of death: 5 September 1954 (aged 72)
- Place of death: Lytham, England
- Position: Centre forward

Senior career*
| Years | Team | Apps | (Gls) |
- Lytham Institute
| 1903–1906 | Bury | 40 | (11) |
| 1906–1907 | Plymouth Argyle | 28 | (15) |
| 1907–1909 | Crystal Palace | 69 | (15) |
| 1909–1910 | Queens Park Rangers | 4 | (1) |
- * Club domestic league appearances and goals

Herbert Swann (28 March 1882 – 5 September 1954) was an English professional footballer who played in the Football League for Bury between 1903 and 1906. A centre forward, he then spent the 1906–07 season playing in the Southern League and the Western League for Plymouth Argyle. On 31 October 1906, Swann scored all five goals in a 5–0 Western League victory over Millwall. He went on to spend two seasons as a first-team regular with Crystal Palace, and finished his career with a third Southern League club, Queens Park Rangers.
