= Matthew Edwards (footballer) =

English footballer (1882–1944)

Personal information
- Date of birth: 1882
- Place of birth: South Shields, England
- Date of death: 1944 (aged 61–62)

Senior career*
Years	Team	Apps	(Gls)
- Barnsley
1905–1908	Crystal Palace	5	(5)
- Doncaster Rovers
- * Club domestic league appearances and goals

Matthew Edwards (1882–1944) was an English footballer who played for Barnsley, Crystal Palace as a fullback and Doncaster Rovers. Edwards played for Palace during their shock FA Cup win over Newcastle United in 1907.
