= Horace Astley =

English footballer

Personal information
- Date of birth: 1882
- Place of birth: Bolton, England
- Position: Forward

Senior career*
Years	Team	Apps	(Gls)
- Middlesbrough
1905–1907	Crystal Palace	32	(12)
- Heywood United
- * Club domestic league appearances and goals

Horace Astley (born 1882) was an English footballer who played for Crystal Palace as a forward.

== Career ==
Born in Bolton, Astley played professionally for Middlesbrough, before following manager Jack Robson South to join the newly established club, Crystal Palace. Astley was the top scorer in the club's second season, 1906–07, the club's first playing in the Southern League Division One. Astley famously scored the only goal in Palace's shock defeat of Newcastle in the first round of the 1906–07 FA Cup.
