= George Walker (footballer, born 1877) =

English footballer

Personal information
- Date of birth: 1877
- Place of birth: Wednesbury, England
- Date of death: 1930 (aged 52–53)
- Position: Full back

Senior career*
Years	Team	Apps	(Gls)
- Wolverhampton Wanderers
1905–06	Crystal Palace	24	(2)
1906–07	New Brompton		
1907–09	Crystal Palace	42	(8)
Total		66	(10)
- * Club domestic league appearances and goals

George Walker (1877–1930) was an English footballer who played for Crystal Palace as a full back.

== Career ==
Born in Wednesbury, Walker played for Wolverhampton Wanderers, before joining the newly established club, Crystal Palace. After one season at Palace Walker moved to New Brompton for the 1906–07 season, before returning to Palace in 1907. He remained with Palace until 1909.

Walker's final career match was a four-nil loss to Swindon Town in the Southern Football League Division One on 17 October 1908, where he suffered a knee injury that left him unable to continue playing. He remained contracted to Crystal Palace until 30 April 1909, when the club opted to not re-sign him. Following this decision by the club, Walker sued Crystal Palace under the Workmen's Compensation Act 1906, where the King's Bench Division upheld a Croydon county court judge's decision to award him with compensation on the basis that he was permanently incapacitated from earning wages in any suitable employment.
