= George Woodger =

English footballer

Personal information
- Date of birth: 3 September 1883
- Place of birth: Croydon, England
- Date of death: 6 March 1961 (aged 77)
- Place of death: Croydon, England
- Height: 5 ft 7 1/2 in (1.71 m)
- Position: Outside left

Senior career*
Years	Team	Apps	(Gls)
1905–1910	Crystal Palace	150	(36)
1910–?	Oldham Athletic		

International career
1911	England	1	(0)
- * Club domestic league appearances and goals

George Woodger (3 September 1883 – 6 March 1961) was an English international footballer, who played as an outside left.

== Career ==
Born in Croydon, he signed for Crystal Palace in 1905 from local club Thornton Heath Wednesday, and played a part in their 1–0 away win against Newcastle United in the FA Cup in 1907. In some reports, Woodger was said to have provided the pass that led to the goal that was scored by Horace Astley.

Woodger moved to Oldham Athletic, in September 1910 for a fee of £750 and earned one cap for England in 1911 during his time with the Lancashire club.
