= Sydney Bourne =

English football club executive

Sydney Bourne (c. 1857- 1930) was the first chairman of Crystal Palace F.C..

Bourne was a local football enthusiast who joined the board of Crystal Palace at the invitation of Edmund Goodman. Goodman had stumbled upon Bourne's name after searching the records of FA Cup Final ticket sales. Noting that Bourne was a regular purchaser of tickets, Goodman approached him regarding the idea of a new club playing at the FA Cup Final venue. Bourne was very agreeable to the idea and joined the board of directors, being elected chairman at the club's first ever meeting and remaining until his death in 1930.

In 1909, Bourne was quoted in the press on the idea circulating at the time of football players forming a trade union. Bourne wished to place a Director's view of the idea on the public record, and noted: "nine out of ten clubs in England are insolvent, and are only kept alive by the personal sacrifices of their directors. If trade unionism is going to step in and interfere in every petty dispute there is not a director who will risk another shilling or devote another hour's work for the sport. Club directors have no objection to players forming a union of their own on fair and proper lines, but they are unanimously determined that any federation of players must work with their employers, and not against them, as the present players' union would do." Bourne also oversaw the purchase of the land for the building of Selhurst Park, which is still the club's home stadium today.
