= Dick Roberts (footballer, born 1878) =

English footballer (1878–1931)

Dickie Roberts
Personal information
- Full name: Richard James Hollis Roberts
- Date of birth: 30 March 1878
- Place of birth: Redditch, England
- Date of death: 5 March 1931 (aged 52)
- Place of death: Birmingham, England
- Position: Winger

Senior career*
Years	Team	Apps	(Gls)
1899–1901	West Bromwich Albion	52	(10)
1901–1904	Newcastle United	54	(18)
1904–1905	Middlesbrough	23	(5)
1905–1908	Crystal Palace	74	(25)
1908–1909	Worcester City	18	(2)
- * Club domestic league appearances and goals

Richard James Hollis Roberts (30 March 1878 – 5 March 1931) was an English footballer who played as a winger.

== Career ==
Roberts was born in Redditch in Worcestershire. He turned professional with West Bromwich Albion in April 1899, but remained with the club for just two years. In May 1901 he joined Newcastle United for a £150 fee, before signing for Middlesbrough for £450 in April 1904. Roberts moved to Crystal Palace for £100 in August 1905, and three years later joined Worcester City, before retiring in April 1909 due to injury. He died in Birmingham in 1931, aged 52.
