= Archie Needham =

English footballer

Personal information
- Full name: Archibald Needham
- Date of birth: 2 August 1881
- Place of birth: Sheffield, England
- Date of death: 1950 (aged 68–69)
- Position: Utility player

Senior career*
Years	Team	Apps	(Gls)
- Sheffield United
1905–09	Crystal Palace	103	(24)
- Glossop
- * Club domestic league appearances and goals

Archibald Needham (2 August 1881 – 1950) was an English footballer, who played for Crystal Palace in a variety of positions.

== Career ==
Born in Sheffield, Needham played professionally for Sheffield United but unlike his namesake (relative?) Ernest Needham he was not a regular first team player. In 1905 he joined new club Crystal Palace, and was the club's top scorer in their first season, playing in the Southern League Division Two. Needham was a versatile player, and played in almost every position save for goalkeeper whilst at Palace. On 21 January 1909, he scored a memorable goal against Football League side Wolves in an FA Cup first round replay. In the dying minutes of extra time, Fred Fountain wrote of the goal in the Croydon Advertiser in 1946: "...he simply weaved his way through all the players and dribbled it right up to the Wolves' goal, putting in an unstoppable shot." Writing in The Penny Illustrated Paper, John Cameron called Needham "The brilliant Crystal Palace 'utility man'."
