= Jack Robson (football manager) =

English football manager (1860–1922)

Personal information
- Full name: John Robson
- Date of birth: 24 May 1860
- Place of birth: Durham, England
- Date of death: 11 January 1922 (aged 61)
- Place of death: Manchester, England

Managerial career
- Years: Team
- 1899–1905: Middlesbrough (secretary)
- 1905–1907: Crystal Palace (secretary)
- 1908–1914: Brighton & Hove Albion (secretary)
- 1914–1921: Manchester United

John Robson (24 May 1860 – 11 January 1922) was an Englishman who was the full-time secretary manager of Middlesbrough, Crystal Palace and Brighton & Hove Albion, as well as manager of Manchester United.

== Career ==
Robson started his managerial career with Middlesbrough, where he was paid £3 a week and declined to travel to away games as an economic measure. Despite his parsimonious attitude, he took the club from being an amateur outfit in the Northern League to a professional club in the First Division. He was also the first manager of Crystal Palace and coached the club to one of the greatest FA Cup shocks of all time when they defeated Newcastle United at St James' Park in 1907. He later managed Brighton & Hove Albion and started the concept of being a manager and not a secretary at Manchester United. He stepped down as United manager due to ill health in October 1921 and died of pneumonia on 11 January 1922.

== Managerial statistics ==
Team	Nat	From	To	Record				
Team	Nat	From	To	G	W	L	D	Win %
Middlesbrough	England	May 1899	May 1905	215	82	86	47	38.14
Crystal Palace	England	August 1905	April 1907	77	35	18	24	45.45
Brighton & Hove Albion	England	August 1908	May 1914	14	5	6	3	35.71
Manchester United	England	December 1914	October 1921	139	41	42	56	29.5
Total				445	163	152	130	36.63

== Honours ==
=== As a manager ===
Brighton & Hove Albion

- Southern League Division One: 1909–10
- Charity Shield: 1910
