= List of Crystal Palace F.C. seasons =

Crystal Palace's team during its first season, 1905–06.

This is a list of Crystal Palace F.C. seasons in English and European football, from their first official season in 1905–06 up to the 2025–26 season. It details the club's achievements in senior league and cup competitions, European competitions and the top scorers for each season. The list of top scorers also chronicles how the club's scoring records have progressed throughout its history.

== Key ==
Key to divisions

- SL Div 2 = Southern League Second Division
- SL Div 1 = Southern League First Division
- Div 1 = Football League First Division
- Div 2 = Football League Second Division
- Div 3 = Football League Third Division
- Div 3S = Football League Third Division South
- Div 4 = Football League Fourth Division
- Prem = Premier League
- Champ = Football League Championship

Key to positions and symbols

- 1st/W = Winners
- 2nd/RU = Runners-up
- ↑ = Promoted
- ↓ = Relegated

Key to rounds

- GS = Group stage
- LP = League phase
- R1 = First round, etc.
- KPO = Knockout phase play-offs
- R16 = Round of 16
- QF = Quarter-finals
- SF = Semi-finals
- SF/S = Semi-finals – Southern Section
- RU = Runners-up
- RU/S = Runners-up Southern Section
- W = Winners

== Seasons ==
List of seasons, including league division and statistics, cup results and top scorer(s)
Season	League									FA Cup	EFL Cup (Note: The League Cup was founded in the 1960–61 season.)	Europe / Other		Top scorer(s) (Note: Figures include goals in the Southern, Football and Premier Leagues, FA Cup, League Cup, European competitions, play-offs and the Full Members' Cup.)	
Season	Division	Pld	W	D	L	GF	GA	Pts	Pos	FA Cup	EFL Cup	Competition	Result	Player(s)	Goals
1905–06	SL Div 2 ↑	24	19	4	1	66	14	42	1st	R1				Archie Needham	21
1906–07	SL Div 1	38	8	9	21	46	66	25	19th	R4				Horace Astley	12
1907–08	SL Div 1	38	17	10	11	54	51	44	4th	R3				George Woodger	15
1908–09	SL Div 1	40	12	12	16	62	62	36	16th	R2				James Bauchop	20
1909–10	SL Div 1	42	20	6	16	69	50	46	7th	R1				George Payne	23
1910–11	SL Div 1	38	17	13	8	55	48	47	4th	R1				Charlie Woodhouse	15
1911–12	SL Div 1	38	15	10	13	70	46	40	7th	R2				Ted Smith	20
1912–13	SL Div 1	38	17	11	10	55	36	45	5th	R3		London Challenge Cup (Note: The London Challenge Cup was a football tournament formerly organised by the London FA. The London Challenge Cup was first contested in 1908, and other than during the World Wars, was contested every season until 1974, when the tournament was disbanded. League clubs tended to play reserve sides whilst non-league clubs fielded a full strength team. Only the instances where Palace won the cup are listed here, and appearances and goals scored do not contribute to player totals.)	W	Ted Smith	27
1913–14	SL Div 1	38	17	16	5	60	32	50	2nd	R2		London Challenge Cup	W	Ted Smith	27
1914–15	SL Div 1	38	13	8	17	47	61	34	15th	R1				Ted Smith	20
No competitive football was played between 1915 and 1919 due to the First World War
1919–20	SL Div 1	42	20	6	16	69	50	46	3rd	R1				Ted Smith	19
1920–21	Div 3 ↑ (Note: In 1921 the English Football League created the Third Division by electing all of the clubs in the Southern League Division One bar Cardiff City. Cardiff were elected to Division Two and Grimsby Town, last place in the Second Division for 1919–20, were relegated.)	42	24	11	7	70	34	59	1st	R2		London Challenge Cup	W	John Conner	28
1921–22	Div 2	42	13	13	16	45	51	39	14th	R2				John Conner	10
1922–23	Div 2	42	13	11	18	54	62	37	16th	R1				George Whitworth	17
1923–24	Div 2	42	13	13	16	53	65	39	15th	R3				George Whitworth	17
1924–25	Div 2 ↓	42	12	10	20	38	54	34	21st	R2				George Whitworth	14
1925–26	Div 3S	42	19	3	20	75	79	41	13th	R5				Percy Cherrett	33
1926–27	Div 3S	42	18	9	15	84	81	45	6th	R1				Percy Cherrett	32
1927–28	Div 3S	42	18	12	12	79	72	48	5th	R2				George Clarke	22
1928–29	Div 3S	42	23	8	11	81	67	54	2nd	R5				Harry Havelock	24
1929–30	Div 3S	42	17	12	13	81	74	46	9th	R3				Peter Simpson	37
1930–31	Div 3S	42	22	7	13	107	71	51	2nd	R4				Peter Simpson	54 (Note: Peter Simpson's 54 goals, 46 in the League and 8 in the FA Cup, still stands as the club record.)
1931–32	Div 3S	42	20	11	11	74	63	51	4th	R2				Peter Simpson	24
1932–33	Div 3S	42	19	8	15	78	64	46	5th	R1				Peter Simpson	15
1933–34	Div 3S	42	16	9	17	71	67	41	12th	R4		Third Division South Cup (Note: The Football League Third Division South Cup ran from the 1933–34 season until 1945–46 season.)	R1	Peter Simpson	21
1934–35	Div 3S	42	19	10	13	86	64	48	5th	R1		Third Division South Cup	R3	Albert Dawes	19
1935–36	Div 3S	42	22	5	15	96	74	49	6th	R2		Third Division South Cup	SF	Albert Dawes	39
1936–37	Div 3S	42	13	12	17	62	61	38	14th	R1		Third Division South Cup	R2	Jack Blackman	12
1937–38	Div 3S	42	18	12	12	67	47	48	7th	R3		Third Division South Cup	R2	Jack Blackman	17
1938–39	Div 3S	42	20	12	10	71	52	52	2nd	R1		Third Division South Cup	SF	Albert Dawes	14
1939–40 (Note: The 1939–40 season was abandoned in early September and all results annulled, after only three matches had been played.)	Div 3S	3	2	1	0	8	9	5	2nd					Ernest Waldron	5
No competitive football was played between 1939 and 1945 due to the Second World War
1945–46	There was no league football in 1945–46.									R3 (Note: All FA Cup ties in 1945–46 were played on a two legged basis.)					
1946–47	Div 3S	42	13	11	18	49	62	37	18th	R3				Bill Naylor	11
1947–48	Div 3S	42	13	13	16	49	49	39	13th	R3				Fred Kurz	18
1948–49	Div 3S	42	8	11	23	38	76	27	22nd (Note: The club successfully applied for re-election to the Football League.)	R1				Fred Kurz	12
1949–50	Div 3S	42	15	14	13	55	54	44	7th	R1				Ronnie Rooke	21
1950–51	Div 3S	46	8	11	27	33	84	27	24th	R1				Noel Kelly Ronnie Rooke	5
1951–52	Div 3S	46	15	9	22	61	80	39	19th	R1				Cam Burgess	21
1952–53	Div 3S	46	15	13	18	66	82	43	13th	R2				Cam Burgess	19
1953–54	Div 3S	46	14	12	20	60	86	40	22nd	R1				Bob Thomas	20
1954–55	Div 3S	46	11	16	19	52	80	38	20th	R2				Jimmy Belcher	12
1955–56	Div 3S	46	12	10	24	54	83	34	23rd	R1				Mike Deakin	8
1956–57	Div 3S	46	11	18	17	62	75	40	20th	R3				Mike Deakin	16
1957–58	Div 3S	46	15	13	18	70	72	43	14th	R3				George Cooper	17
1958–59	Div 4 (Note: Crystal Palace were placed in the Fourth Division on league reorganisation.)	46	20	12	14	90	71	52	7th	R3				Mike Deakin	27
1959–60	Div 4	46	19	12	15	84	64	50	8th (Note: Lowest League finish.)	R3				Johnny Byrne	19
1960–61	Div 4 ↑	46	29	6	11	110	69	64	2nd	R2	R1			Johnny Byrne	31
1961–62	Div 3	46	14	14	18	83	80	42	15th	R3	R1			Andy Smillie	19
1962–63	Div 3	46	17	13	16	68	58	47	11th	R2	R2			Peter Burridge	15
1963–64	Div 3 ↑	46	23	14	9	73	51	60	2nd	R2	R2			Cliff Holton	23
1964–65	Div 2	42	16	13	13	55	51	45	7th	QF	R4			Cliff Holton	17
1965–66	Div 2	42	14	13	15	47	52	41	11th	R3	R2			Brian Whitehouse	7
1966–67	Div 2	42	19	10	13	61	55	48	7th	R3	R2			Bobby Woodruff	18
1967–68	Div 2	42	14	11	17	56	56	39	11th	R3	R2			Bobby Woodruff	18
1968–69	Div 2 ↑	42	22	12	8	70	47	56	2nd	R3	QF			Cliff Jackson	17
1969–70	Div 1	42	6	15	21	34	68	27	20th	R5	R4			Cliff Jackson	11
1970–71	Div 1	42	12	11	19	39	57	35	18th	R3	QF	Anglo-Italian Cup	GS	Alan Birchenall	14
1971–72	Div 1	42	8	13	21	39	65	29	20th	R3	R3			Bobby Tambling	11
1972–73	Div 1 ↓	42	9	12	21	41	58	30	21st	R4	R2	Anglo-Italian Cup	SF	Don Rogers	15
1973–74	Div 2 ↓	42	11	12	19	43	56	34	20th	R3	R2			Don Rogers	15
1974–75	Div 3	46	18	15	13	66	57	51	5th	R2	R2			Alan Whittle	16
1975–76	Div 3	46	18	17	11	61	46	53	5th	SF	R2			Dave Swindlehurst	19
1976–77	Div 3 ↑	46	23	13	10	68	40	59	3rd	R3	R2			Rachid Harkouk Dave Swindlehurst	13
1977–78	Div 2	42	13	15	14	50	47	41	9th	R3	R2			Rachid Harkouk Dave Swindlehurst	12
1978–79	Div 2 ↑	42	19	19	4	51	24	57	1st	R5	R3			Dave Swindlehurst	15
1979–80	Div 1	42	12	16	14	41	50	40	13th	R3	R3			Mike Flanagan Ian Walsh	9
1980–81	Div 1 ↓	42	6	7	29	47	83	19	22nd	R3	R3			Clive Allen	11
1981–82	Div 2	42	13	9	20	34	45	48 (Note: The 1981–82 season saw the introduction of three points for a win.)	15th	QF	R4			Kevin Mabbutt	8
1982–83	Div 2	42	12	12	18	43	52	48	15th	R5	R3	Football League Group Cup (Note: The Football League Group Cup was founded in the 1981–82 season and lasted just two seasons.)	GS	Kevin Mabbutt	12
1983–84	Div 2	42	12	11	19	42	52	47	18th	R4	R1			Tony Evans	7
1984–85	Div 2	42	12	12	18	46	65	48	15th	R3	R2			Trevor Aylott	9
1985–86	Div 2	42	19	9	14	57	52	66	5th	R3	R2	Full Members' Cup (Note: The Full Members' Cup was founded in the 1985–86 season and lasted until the 1991–92 season.)	R1	Andy Gray Phil Barber	11
1986–87	Div 2	42	19	5	18	51	53	62	6th	R4	R3	Full Members' Cup	R1	Ian Wright	11
1987–88	Div 2	44	22	9	13	86	59	75	6th	R3	R3	Full Members' Cup	R1	Mark Bright	
1988–89	Div 2 ↑	46	23	12	11	71	49	81	3rd (Note: Promoted via play-offs after defeating Blackburn Rovers 4–3 on aggregate after extra time in the two-leg final.)	R3	R3	Full Members' Cup	SF	Ian Wright	33
1989–90	Div 1	38	13	9	16	42	66	48	15th	RU	R3	Full Members' Cup	RU/S	Mark Bright	17
1990–91	Div 1	38	20	9	9	50	41	69	3rd (Note: Highest League finish.)	R3	R4	Full Members' Cup	W	Ian Wright	25
1991–92	Div 1	42	14	15	13	53	61	57	10th	R3	QF	Full Members' Cup	SF/S	Mark Bright	22
1992–93	Prem (Note: The 22 teams in the First Division broke away and formed a new division, the Premier League, but retained promotion from the Football League's Division One, which now consisted of teams from the Second Division.) ↓	42	11	16	15	48	61	49 (Note: The relegation with 49 points is the highest points total amassed by a team relegated from the Premier League, which initially held 22 teams. It is the joint highest total of points attained by a team relegated from the top flight division, equalling Norwich's total in 1984–85.)	20th	R3	SF			Chris Armstrong	15
1993–94	Div 1 ↑	46	27	9	10	73	46	90	1st	R3	R3			Chris Armstrong	25
1994–95	Prem ↓	42	11	12	19	34	49	45	19th (Note: The Premier League reduced from 22 teams to 20 at the end of this season so four teams were relegated, with the club relegated after finishing fourth from bottom.)	SF	SF			Chris Armstrong	18
1995–96	Div 1	46	20	15	11	67	48	75	3rd (Note: Lost in play-off final to Leicester.)	R3	R3			Dougie Freedman	20
1996–97	Div 1 ↑	46	19	14	13	78	48	71	6th (Note: Promoted via play-offs after defeating Sheffield United 1–0.)	R3	R3			Bruce Dyer	18
1997–98	Prem ↓	38	8	9	21	37	71	33	20th	R5	R2			Bruce Dyer	8
1998–99	Div 1	46	14	16	16	58	71	58	14th	R3	R2	UEFA Intertoto Cup	R3	Clinton Morrison	13
1999–2000	Div 1	46	13	15	18	57	67	54	15th	R3	R2			Clinton Morrison	15
2000–01	Div 1	46	12	13	21	57	70	49	21st	R3	SF			Clinton Morrison	19
2001–02	Div 1	46	20	6	20	70	62	66	10th	R3	R3			Clinton Morrison	24
2002–03	Div 1	46	14	17	15	59	52	59	14th	R5	QF			Andrew Johnson	17
2003–04	Div 1 ↑	46	21	10	15	72	61	73	6th (Note: Promoted via play-offs after defeating West Ham 1–0.)	R3	R4			Andrew Johnson	32
2004–05	Prem ↓	38	7	12	19	41	62	33	18th	R3	R4			Andrew Johnson	21
2005–06	Champ (Note: The First Division had been renamed the Championship in the previous season.)	46	21	12	13	67	48	75	6th (Note: Lost in play-off semi-final to Watford.)	R4	R4			Andrew Johnson	17
2006–07	Champ	46	18	11	17	59	51	65	12th	R4	R1			Clinton Morrison	12
2007–08	Champ	46	18	17	11	58	42	71	5th (Note: Lost in play-off semi-final to Bristol City.)	R3	R1			Clinton Morrison	16
2008–09	Champ	46	15	12	19	52	55	56 (Note: One point deducted for fielding an ineligible player.)	15th	R4	R2			Shefki Kuqi	10
2009–10	Champ	46	14	17	15	50	53	49 (Note: Ten points deducted for entering administration.)	21st	R5	R2			Darren Ambrose	20
2010–11	Champ	46	12	12	22	44	69	48	20th	R3	R2			James Vaughan	9
2011–12	Champ	46	13	17	16	46	51	56	17th	R3	SF			Darren Ambrose	10
2012–13	Champ ↑	46	19	15	12	73	62	72	5th (Note: Promoted via play-offs after defeating Watford 1–0 after extra time. The club have now appeared in a record 5 play-off finals, been promoted a record 4 times via the play-offs, and have equalled the record of 7 appearances in the play-offs, held with Ipswich Town and Leicester City.)	R3	R2			Glenn Murray	31
2013–14	Prem	38	13	6	19	33	48	45	11th	R4	R2			Dwight Gayle	8
2014–15	Prem	38	13	9	16	47	51	48	10th	R5	R3			Dwight Gayle	10
2015–16	Prem	38	11	9	18	39	51	42	15th	RU	R4			Dwight Gayle	7
2016–17	Prem	38	12	5	21	50	63	41	14th	R4	R3			Christian Benteke	15
2017–18	Prem	38	11	11	16	45	55	44	11th	R3	R4			Luka Milivojević	10
2018–19	Prem	38	14	7	17	51	53	49	12th	QF	R4			Luka Milivojević	12
2019–20	Prem	38	11	10	17	31	50	43	14th	R3	R2			Jordan Ayew	9
2020–21	Prem	38	12	8	18	41	66	44	14th	R3	R2			Wilfried Zaha	11
2021–22	Prem	38	11	15	12	50	46	48	12th	SF	R2			Wilfried Zaha	15
2022–23	Prem	38	11	12	15	40	49	45	11th	R3	R3			Eberechi Eze	10
2023–24	Prem	38	13	10	15	57	58	49	10th	R3	R3			Jean-Philippe Mateta	19
2024–25	Prem	38	13	14	11	51	51	53	12th	W	QF			Jean-Philippe Mateta	17
2025–26	Prem	38	11	12	15	41	51	45	15th	R3	QF	FA Community Shield	W	Ismaïla Sarr	21
2025–26	Prem	38	11	12	15	41	51	45	15th	R3	QF	UEFA Conference League	W	Ismaïla Sarr	21

=== Overall ===
- Seasons spent at Level 1 of the football league system: 26
- Seasons spent at Level 2 of the football league system: 37
- Seasons spent at Level 3 of the football league system: 33
- Seasons spent at Level 4 of the football league system: 3

== Sources ==
- Soccerbase
- Football Club History Database
- Football Site
- Peskett, Roy (1969). The Crystal Palace Story. Roy Peskett Limited. ISBN 9780950103907.
- King, Ian (2012). Crystal Palace: The Complete Record 1905-2011. Derby Books Publishing Company Limited. ISBN 978-1-78091-221-9.
