= List of Crystal Palace F.C. records and statistics =

This article lists the records set by Crystal Palace Football Club, their managers and players, including honours won by the club and details of their performance in European competition. The player records section itemises the club's leading goalscorers and those who have made the most appearances in first-team competitions. It also records notable achievements by Palace players on the international stage, and the highest transfer fees paid and received by the club.

== Player records ==
=== Appearances ===
- Youngest first-team player: John Bostock, 15 years, 287 days, v Watford, 29 October 2007
- Oldest first-team player: Jack Little, 41 years, 68 days v Gillingham (away), 3 April 1926
- First substitute: Keith Smith v Leyton Orient, 28 August 1965

==== Most appearances ====
Competitive and professional matches only

| No. | Country | Name | Played | Apps | Goals | Position |
|---|---|---|---|---|---|---|
| 1 | (Scotland) | Jim Cannon | 1973–1988 | 660 | 36 | DF |
| 2 | (England) | Terry Long | 1955–1970 | 480 | 18 | DF |
| 3 | (Ivory Coast) | Wilfried Zaha | 2010–2013; 2014–2023 | 458 | 90 | FW |
| 4 | (England) | Bert Harry | 1921–1934 | 440 | 55 | MF |
| 5 | (Argentina) | Julián Speroni | 2004–2019 | 405 | 0 | GK |
| 6 | (England) | John Jackson | 1964–1973 | 393 | 0 | GK |
| 7 | (Scotland) | Dougie Freedman | 1995–1997; 2000–2008 | 368 | 108 | FW |
| 8 | (England) | Joel Ward | 2012–2025 | 363 | 5 | DF |
| 9 | (England) | Nigel Martyn | 1989–1996 | 349 | 0 | GK |
| 10 | (England) | Simon Rodger | 1990–2002 | 328 | 12 | MF |

=== Goalscorers ===
- Most goals in a season: 54, Peter Simpson, 1930–31
- Most league goals in a season: 46, Peter Simpson, 1930–31
- Most league goals in a top-flight season: 21, Andy Johnson, 2004–05
- Most goals in a competitive match: 6, Peter Simpson, v Exeter City, Football League Division Three South, 4 October 1930 (Note: Amateur Sidney Sanders scored 6 in the 10-1 defeat of Reading, 4 March 1916 in the inter-war competitions, but is not considered part of official records.)
- Most goals in an FA Cup match: 4, Peter Simpson, v Newark Town, 13 December 1930
- Most goals in a League Cup match: 3
  - Mark Bright, v Southend United, 25 September 1990
  - Ian Wright, v Southend United, 25 September 1990
  - Dwight Gayle, v Walsall, 26 August 2014
  - Dwight Gayle, v Charlton Athletic, 23 September 2015
  - Jean-Philippe Mateta, v Plymouth Argyle, 29 August 2023
- Fastest recorded goal: 6 seconds, Keith Smith v Derby County (away), 12 December 1964
- Most hat-tricks, all competitions: 20, Peter Simpson (Note: Includes Simpson's 6 goals against Exeter City as a double hat-trick)
- Oldest player to score a goal: Kevin Phillips, 39 years 306 days, v Watford, 27 May 2013
- Quickest hat-trick in a League match: Kevin Phillips, 8 minutes, 37 seconds v Hull City, 5 March 2013 (Note: Hat-trick completed either side of Half Time Period)
- Quickest hat-trick in a Cup match: Danny Butterfield, 6 minutes, 48 seconds v Wolverhampton Wanderers, FA Cup Fourth round Replay, 2 February 2010

==== Top goalscorers ====
Peter Simpson is the all-time top goalscorer for the club. He was leading goalscorer for five consecutive seasons, from 1929–30 to 1933–34.

Competitive, professional matches only. Goalscorers with an equal number of goals are ranked with the highest to lowest goals per game ratio.

| # | Country | Name | Played | Goals | Apps | Position | Goals per game |
|---|---|---|---|---|---|---|---|
| 1 | (Scotland) | Peter Simpson | 1929–1935 | 165 | 195 | FW | 0.85 |
| 2 | (England) | Edwin Smith | 1911–1920 | 124 | 192 | FW | 0.65 |
| 3 | (England) | Ian Wright | 1985–1991 | 118 | 277 | FW | 0.43 |
| 4 | (England) | Mark Bright | 1986–1992 | 114 | 286 | FW | 0.40 |
| 5 | (Republic of Ireland) | Clinton Morrison | 1998–2002; 2005–2008 | 112 | 316 | FW | 0.35 |
| 6 | (Scotland) | Dougie Freedman | 1995–1997; 2000–2008 | 108 | 368 | FW | 0.29 |
| 7 | (England) | George Clarke | 1925–1933 | 106 | 299 | MF | 0.35 |
| 8 | (England) | Johnny Byrne | 1956–1962; 1967–1968 | 101 | 259 | FW | 0.39 |
| 9 | (England) | Albert Dawes | 1933–1936; 1938–1939 | 92 | 156 | FW | 0.59 |
| 10 | (Ivory Coast) | Wilfried Zaha | 2010–2013; 2014–2023 | 90 | 458 | FW | 0.20 |

=== International caps ===
This section refers only to international caps won by players during their time at Crystal Palace.

- First capped player: Billy Davies for Wales, v Scotland, 7 March 1908, Dundee
- First capped player for England: Horace Colclough, v Wales, 16 March 1914, Cardiff
- Most capped player: 55, Wayne Hennessey, Wales
- Most capped player for England: 23, Marc Guéhi
- First player to play in the World Cup: Gregg Berhalter, 2002, United States
- First player to score in the World Cup: Mile Jedinak, 2014, Australia

=== Transfers ===
==== Record transfer fees paid ====
| # | Pos: | Player | Transferred from | Fee | Date | Source |
|---|---|---|---|---|---|---|
| 1 | FW | (Norway) Jørgen Strand Larsen | (England) Wolverhampton Wanderers | £48,000,000 | February 2026 | BBC Sport |
| 2 | FW | (Wales) Brennan Johnson | (England) Tottenham Hotspur | £35,000,000 | January 2026 | BBC Sport |
| 3 | FW | (Belgium) Christian Benteke | (England) Liverpool | £32,000,000 | August 2016 | BBC Sport |
| 4 | FW | (England) Eddie Nketiah | (England) Arsenal | £30,000,000 | August 2024 | BBC Sport |
| 5 | DF | (France) Mamadou Sakho | (England) Liverpool | £26,000,000 | August 2017 | BBC Sport |
| 5 | FW | (Spain) Yeremy Pino | (Spain) Villarreal | £26,000,000 | August 2025 | BBC Sport |
| 7 | DF | (England) Marc Guéhi | (England) Chelsea | £20,500,000 | July 2021 | BBC Sport |
| 8 | MF | (Mali) Cheick Doucouré | (France) Lens | £19,800,000 | July 2022 | BBC Sport |
| 9 | MF | (England) Eberechi Eze | (England) Queens Park Rangers | £19,500,000 | August 2020 | BBC Sport |
| 10 | DF | (France) Maxence Lacroix | (Germany) VfL Wolfsburg | £18,000,000 | August 2024 | BBC Sport |
| 10 | MF | (England) Adam Wharton | (England) Blackburn Rovers | £18,000,000 | January 2024 | BBC Sport |

==== Record transfer fees received ====
| # | Pos: | Player | Transferred to | Fee | Date | Source |
|---|---|---|---|---|---|---|
| 1 | MF | (England) Eberechi Eze | (England) Arsenal | £68,000,000 | August 2025 | BBC Sport |
| 2 | DF | (France) Maxence Lacroix | (England) Chelsea | £52,000,000 | July 2026 | BBC Sport |
| 3 | FW | (France) Michael Olise | (Germany) Bayern Munich | £50,800,000 | July 2024 | BBC Sport |
| 4 | DF | (Democratic Republic of the Congo) Aaron Wan-Bissaka | (England) Manchester United | £45,000,000 (~ £50,000,000) | June 2019 | BBC Sport |
| 5 | DF | (Denmark) Joachim Andersen | (England) Fulham | £30,000,000 | August 2024 | BBC Sport |
| 6 | FW | (Democratic Republic of the Congo) Yannick Bolasie | (England) Everton | £25,000,000 | August 2016 | BBC Sport |
| 7 | DF | (England) Marc Guéhi | (England) Manchester City | £20,000,000 | January 2026 | BBC Sport |
| 8 | FW | (Norway) Alexander Sørloth | (Germany) RB Leipzig | £17,600,000 | September 2020 | BBC Sport |
| 9 | GK | (England) Sam Johnstone | (England) Wolverhampton Wanderers | £10,000,000 | August 2024 | BBC Sport |
| 9 | FW | (England) Dwight Gayle | (England) Newcastle United | £10,000,000 | July 2016 | BBC Sport |
| 9 | FW | (Ivory Coast) Wilfried Zaha | (England) Manchester United | £10,000,000 | January 2013 | BBC Sport |

== Managerial records ==
- First manager: John Robson, managed the club from 1905 to 1907, encompassing 77 games.
- Longest serving manager: Edmund Goodman, managed the club from 1907 to 1925, encompassing 613 matches excluding wartime competition.
- Second longest serving manager: Steve Coppell, managed the club over four spells; 1984 to 1993, 1995–96, 1997–98, and 1999–2000, encompassing 565 matches in total. He also achieved Palace's highest ever league finish (third-place in the top-flight in 1990–91), took the club to the FA Cup final in 1990 and won the Full Members' Cup the following season.
- First manager to win a major trophy: Oliver Glasner, who won the FA Cup in 2025. He then went on to win the 2025 FA Community Shield and the 2025–26 UEFA Conference League, becoming the club's most successful manager to date.

== Club records ==
=== Positions ===
- Highest League Finish: 3rd in the Old First Division (now Premier League) 1990–91
- Lowest League Finish:
  - Southern League: 1st in the Southern League Division Two, 1905–06
  - Football League: 24th in the Old Division Three South, 1950–51
- Highest League Position: 1st in the Old First Division, 29 September 1979 – 6 October 1979
- Lowest League Position: 20th in the Old Fourth Division, 2 September 1959

=== Goals ===
- Most league goals scored in a season: 110, Division Four, 1960–61
- Fewest league goals scored in a season: 31, Premier League, 2019–20
- Most league goals conceded in a season: 86, Division Three South, 1953–54
- Fewest league goals conceded in a season:
  - Southern League; 14, Division Two, 1905–06
  - Football League; 24, Division Two, 1978–79

=== Points ===
- Most points in a season:

Two points for a win: 64, Division Four, 1960–61
Three points for a win: 90, Division One, 1993–94

- Fewest points in a season:

Two points for a win: 19, Division One, 1980–81
Three points for a win: 33, Premier League, 1997–98

=== Matches ===
==== Firsts ====
- First match: New Brompton 0–3 v Crystal Palace, United League, 1 September 1905
- First FA Cup match: Crystal Palace 7–0 v Clapham, 7 October 1905, Crystal Palace Stadium
- First Southern League match: Crystal Palace 3–4 v Southampton Reserves, 2 September 1905, Crystal Palace Stadium
- First Football League match: Merthyr 2–1 v Crystal Palace, 28 August 1920
- First match at Herne Hill Velodrome: Crystal Palace 1–2 v Southampton, 3 March 1915
- First match at The Nest:
  - Friendly; Crystal Palace 4–1 v Millwall, August 1918
  - London Combination; Crystal Palace 4–2 v Queens Park Rangers, 14 September 1918
  - Southern League; Crystal Palace 2–2 v Northampton Town 30 August 1919
- First match at Selhurst Park: Crystal Palace 0–1 v The Wednesday, 30 August 1924
- First European match: Crystal Palace 0–2 v Samsunspor, 19 July 1998, Selhurst Park
- First League Cup match: Darlington 2–0 v Crystal Palace, 12 October 1960

==== Record wins ====
- Record league win: 9–0 v Barrow, 10 October 1959 (Note: During the First World War Crystal Palace won 10–1 v Reading, 4 March 1916, but this, as with all other wartime competitions, is not considered part of official records.)
- Record FA Cup win: 7–0
  - v Clapham, 7 October 1905
  - v Luton Town, 16 January 1929
- Record League Cup win: 8–0 v Southend United, 25 September 1990
- Record European win: 4–0 v Lech Poznan, 17 September 2026
- Record Friendly win: 13–1 v GAK Graz, 16 July 2014

==== Record defeats ====
- Record league defeat home: 0–7 v Liverpool, 19 December 2020
- Record league defeat away: 0–9 v Liverpool, 12 September 1989
- Record FA Cup defeat: 0–9 v Burnley (away), 10 February 1909
- Record League Cup defeat: 0–5
  - v Nottingham Forest (away), 1 November 1989
  - v Liverpool (away), 24 January 2001
- Record European defeat: 0–2
  - v Samsunspor (home), 19 July 1998
  - v Samsunspor (away), 25 July 1998

=== Record consecutive results ===
This section applies to league matches only, unless otherwise stated.

- Record consecutive wins: 8, 9 February – 26 March 1921
- Record consecutive Premier League wins: 5, 29 March – 19 April 2014
- Record consecutive draws: 5
  - 28 March – 16 April 1921
  - 30 December 1978 – 24 February 1979
  - 21 September – 19 October 2002
- Record consecutive defeats: 8
  - 18 April – 19 September 1925
  - 1 January – 14 March 1998
  - 21 May – 30 September 2017
- Record consecutive matches without a defeat: 19, 19 April – 2 October 2025
- Record consecutive top-division matches without a defeat: 12, 19 April – 5 October 2025
- Record consecutive matches in all competitions without a defeat: 19, 19 April – 5 October 2025
- Record consecutive matches without a draw: 24, 31 December 1960 – 26 August 1961
- Record consecutive matches without a win: 20, 3 March – 8 September 1962
- Record consecutive clean sheets: 6, 1 September 1920 – 25 September 1920
- Record consecutive matches without a clean sheet: 24, 30 September 1998 – 20 February 1999
- Record consecutive matches scoring: 24, 27 April 1929 – 21 December 1929
- Record consecutive matches without scoring: 9, 19 November 1994 – 2 January 1995

==== Home ====
- Record consecutive home wins: 12, 19 December 1925 – 28 August 1926
- Record consecutive home draws: 7
  - 24 March 1962 – 1 September 1962
  - 28 November 1998 – 13 February 1999
- Record consecutive home defeats: 6
  - 10 April 1925 – 12 September 1925
  - 10 January 1998 – 11 April 1998
  - 3 January 2016 – 19 March 2016
- Record consecutive home matches without a defeat: 32, 28 February 1931 – 17 September 1932
- Record consecutive home matches without a draw: 17, 17 February 1981 – 19 January 1982
- Record consecutive home matches without a win: 16, 4 May 1997 – 11 April 1998
- Record consecutive home clean sheets: 8
  - 28 December 1963 – 18 March 1964
  - 13 November 2010 – 19 February 2011
- Record consecutive home matches without a clean sheet: 19, 20 January 1951 – 17 November 1951
- Record consecutive home matches scoring: 36, 17 November 1928 – 6 September 1930
- Record consecutive home matches without scoring: 4
  - 3 March 1951 – 31 March 1951
  - 26 November 1994 – 31 December 1994
  - 7 February 2002 – 9 March 2002
  - 20 November 2004 – 26 December 2004

==== Away ====
- Record consecutive away wins: 5, 20 December 2003 – 7 February 2004
- Record consecutive away draws: 6, 18 November 1978 – 10 March 1979
- Record consecutive away defeats: 10
  - 1 April 1980 – 25 October 1980
  - 8 November 1980 – 7 March 1981
- Record consecutive away matches without a defeat: 10
  - 22 December 1928 – 1 April 1929
  - 26 December 1968 – 28 April 1969
  - 23 August 1975 – 6 December 1975
  - 18 November 1978 – 3 April 1979
  - 2 November 2024 – 2 April 2025
- Record consecutive Premier League away matches without a defeat: 10, 2 November 2024 – 2 April 2025
- Record consecutive away matches without a draw: 18
  - 3 October 1960 – 19 August 1961
  - 12 April 1986 – 17 March 1987
- Record consecutive away matches without a win: 31, 15 March 1980 – 3 October 1981
- Record consecutive away clean sheets: 5, 26 December 2024 – 22 February 2025
- Record consecutive away matches without a clean sheet: 30, 22 March 1980 – 3 October 1981
- Record consecutive away matches scoring: 22, 17 March 1928 – 1 April 1929
- Record consecutive away matches without scoring: 8, 11 November 1950 – 24 February 1951

=== Attendances ===
This section applies to attendances at Selhurst Park, where Crystal Palace have played their home matches since the start of the 1924–25 season. Attendance figures from the club's early days are approximate. Palace's highest attendance for a match outside of Selhurst Park is 88,619, v Manchester United at the 2016 FA Cup Final on 21 May 2016.

- Highest attendance: 51,482, 11 May 1979 v Burnley
- Highest FA Cup attendance: 45,384, 10 Mar 1965 v Leeds Utd
- Lowest attendance: 2,165, 18 December 1935 v Newport County
- Highest average league attendance: 29,900, Division 1 1969–70 season.
- Lowest average league attendance: 6,440, Division 2 1984–85 season.

== Crystal Palace in Europe ==
=== Record by season ===
Crystal Palace's scores are given first in all scorelines.

==== Minor/or defunct competitions ====
| Season | Competition | Round | Opponent | | Home leg | Away leg | Ref. |
| Season | Competition | Round | Country | Club | Home leg | Away leg | Ref. |
|---|---|---|---|---|---|---|---|
| 1971 | Anglo-Italian Cup | Group | Italy | Cagliari | 1–0 | 0–2 | |
| 1971 | Anglo-Italian Cup | Group | Italy | Internazionale | 1–1 | 2–1 | |
| 1973 | Anglo-Italian Cup | Group | Italy | Hellas Verona | 4–1 | | |
| 1973 | Anglo-Italian Cup | Group | Italy | Bari | | 1–0 | |
| 1973 | Anglo-Italian Cup | Group | Italy | Lazio | 3–1 | | |
| 1973 | Anglo-Italian Cup | Group | Italy | Fiorentina | | 2–2 | |
| 1973 | Anglo-Italian Cup | Semi-finals | England | Newcastle United | 0–0 | 1–5 | |
| 1998 | UEFA Intertoto Cup | Third round | Turkey | Samsunspor | 0–2 | 0–2 | (Note: Clubs were invited to enter the Intertoto Cup during the preceding season. The Premier League club finishing in the highest position who had not otherwise qualified for Europe were accepted into the competition. Despite finishing twentieth, Palace were entered after the other applicant, Aston Villa, qualified for the UEFA cup.) |

==== Major competitions ====
| Season | Competition | Round | Opponent | | Home leg | Away leg | Ref. |
| Season | Competition | Round | Country | Club | Home leg | Away leg | Ref. |
|---|---|---|---|---|---|---|---|
| 2025–26 | UEFA Conference League | Play-off round | Norway | Fredrikstad | 1–0 | 0–0 | |
| 2025–26 | UEFA Conference League | League phase | Ukraine | Dynamo Kyiv | | 2–0 | |
| 2025–26 | UEFA Conference League | League phase | Cyprus | AEK Larnaca | 0–1 | | |
| 2025–26 | UEFA Conference League | League phase | Netherlands | AZ | 3–1 | | |
| 2025–26 | UEFA Conference League | League phase | France | Strasbourg | | 1–2 | |
| 2025–26 | UEFA Conference League | League phase | Republic of Ireland | Shelbourne | | 3–0 | |
| 2025–26 | UEFA Conference League | League phase | Finland | KuPS | 2–2 | | |
| 2025–26 | UEFA Conference League | Knockout phase play-offs | Bosnia and Herzegovina | Zrinjski Mostar | 2–0 | 1–1 | |
| 2025–26 | UEFA Conference League | Round of 16 | Cyprus | AEK Larnaca | 0–0 | 2–1 (a.e.t.) | |
| 2025–26 | UEFA Conference League | Quarter-finals | Italy | Fiorentina | 3–0 | 1–2 | |
| 2025–26 | UEFA Conference League | Semi-finals | Ukraine | Shakhtar Donetsk | 2–1 | 3–1 | |
| 2025–26 | UEFA Conference League | Final | Spain | Rayo Vallecano | 1–0 (N) | | |

The 2025–26 UEFA Conference League season marked Palace's debut in a major UEFA competition.

=== Record by major competitions ===
| Competition | Record | | | | | | | |
| Competition | Pld | W | D | L | GF | GA | GD | Win % |
|---|---|---|---|---|---|---|---|---|
| UEFA Conference League | 17 | 10 | 4 | 3 | 27 | 12 | +15 | 58.82 |
| Total | 17 | 10 | 4 | 3 | 27 | 12 | +15 | 58.82 |

Last updated: 27 May 2026

=== European attendance records ===
- Highest recorded home attendance: 25,152 v Internazionale, 29 May 1971
- Lowest recorded home attendance: 11,758 v Samsunspor, 19 July 1998
- Highest recorded away attendance: 39,176 v Rayo Vallecano, 27 May 2026
- Lowest recorded away attendance: 10,016 v Fredrikstad, 28 August 2025

== Honours ==
=== Domestic ===
League

- Second Division / First Division / Championship (level 2)
  - Champions: 1978–79, 1993–94
  - Runners-up: 1968–69
  - Play-off winners: 1989, 1997, 2004, 2013
- Third Division / Third Division South (level 3)
  - Champions: 1920–21
  - Runners-up: 1928–29, 1930–31, 1938–39, 1963–64
- Fourth Division (level 4)
  - Runners-up: 1960–61

Cup

- FA Cup
  - Winners: 2024–25
  - Runners-up: 1989–90, 2015–16
- FA Community Shield
  - Winners: 2025
- Full Members' Cup (Note: This was a cup competition held from 1985 to 1992. It was also known under its sponsored names of the Simod Cup from 1987 to 1989 and the Zenith Data Systems Cup from 1989 to 1992. It was created after the Heysel Stadium disaster, when English clubs were banned from European competition, as an additional competition for clubs in the top two divisions.)
  - Winners: 1990–91

=== European ===
- UEFA Conference League
  - Winners: 2025–26

=== Regional ===
- Football League South
  - Champions: 1940–41
- South D League
  - Champions: 1939–40
- Southern Football League Division One
  - Runners-up: 1913–14
- Southern Football League Division Two
  - Champions: 1905–06
- United League
  - Champions: 1906–07
  - Runners-up: 1905–06
- Southern Professional Floodlit Cup
  - Runners-up: 1958–59
- London Challenge Cup (Note: This was a tournament organised by the London FA. It was first contested in 1908, and other than during the World Wars, was contested every season until 1974, when the tournament was disbanded.)
  - Winners: 1912–13, 1913–14, 1920–21
  - Runners-up: 1919–20, 1921–22, 1922–23, 1931–32, 1937–38, 1946–47
- Surrey Senior Cup
  - Winners: 1996–97, 2000–01, 2001–02
- Kent Senior Shield
  - Winners: 1911–12
  - Runners-up: 1912–13
