= Joseph Little =

Joseph Little may refer to:

- Joseph J. Little (1841–1913), U.S. Representative from New York
- Joseph Ignatius Little (1835–1902), lawyer, politician, and judge in the Newfoundland Colony
- Jack Little (footballer) (1885–1965), born Joseph Little, English football full back for Crystal Palace
- Joe Little (1902–1965), English football outside left for Plymouth Argyle, Darlington, Bradford Park Avenue and Rotherham United
- Joe N Little III, American singer and musician best known as the lead singer of 1990s R&B/New jack swing group The Rude Boys
