= 1920–21 in English football =

Football in England
- Season: 1920–21

Men's football
- Football League: Burnley
- Football League Second Division: Birmingham City
- FA Cup: Tottenham Hotspur
- Charity Shield: Tottenham Hotspur

The 1920–21 season was the 46th season of competitive football in England.

== Overview ==
The Football League Third Division is introduced, expanding the League's operational radius south of Birmingham by absorbing top division of the 'non-League' Southern Football League into its ranks. Cardiff City, however, as the strongest club in Wales in the era, is invited directly into the Second Division, and Grimsby Town takes its place in the new Third Division, thereby being the first club relegated to the League's third tier. Leeds United is also elected into the Second Division to replace Leeds City after its debacle. Lincoln City is not re-elected to the Second Division and thus Port Vale's Second Division place is formalized as well.

== Honours ==
Competition	Winner	Runner-up
First Division	Burnley (1)	Manchester City
Second Division	Birmingham	Cardiff City
Third Division	Crystal Palace	Southampton†
FA Cup	Tottenham Hotspur (2)	Wolverhampton Wanderers
Charity Shield	Tottenham Hotspur	Burnley
Home Championship	Scotland	Wales & England

† Not promoted

Notes = Number in parentheses is the times that club has won that honour. * indicates new record for competition

== Football League ==
=== First Division ===
Pos	Team	Pld	W	D	L	GF	GA	GAv	Pts	Relegation
1	Burnley (C)	42	23	13	6	79	36	2.194	59	
2	Manchester City	42	24	6	12	70	50	1.400	54	
3	Bolton Wanderers	42	19	14	9	77	53	1.453	52	
4	Liverpool	42	18	15	9	63	35	1.800	51	
5	Newcastle United	42	20	10	12	66	45	1.467	50	
6	Tottenham Hotspur	42	19	9	14	70	48	1.458	47	
7	Everton	42	17	13	12	66	55	1.200	47	
8	Middlesbrough	42	17	12	13	53	53	1.000	46	
9	Arsenal	42	15	14	13	59	63	0.937	44	
10	Aston Villa	42	18	7	17	63	70	0.900	43	
11	Blackburn Rovers	42	13	15	14	57	59	0.966	41	
12	Sunderland	42	14	13	15	57	60	0.950	41	
13	Manchester United	42	15	10	17	64	68	0.941	40	
14	West Bromwich Albion	42	13	14	15	54	58	0.931	40	
15	Bradford City	42	12	15	15	61	63	0.968	39	
16	Preston North End	42	15	9	18	61	65	0.938	39	
17	Huddersfield Town	42	15	9	18	42	49	0.857	39	
18	Chelsea	42	13	13	16	48	58	0.828	39	
19	Oldham Athletic	42	9	15	18	49	86	0.570	33	
20	Sheffield United	42	6	18	18	42	68	0.618	30	
21	Derby County (R)	42	5	16	21	32	58	0.552	26	Relegation to the Second Division
22	Bradford (Park Avenue) (R)	42	8	8	26	43	76	0.566	24	Relegation to the Second Division

Source: World Football
Rules for classification: 1) Points; 2) Goal average; 3) Goals scored
(C) Champions; (R) Relegated

=== Second Division ===
Pos	Team	Pld	W	D	L	GF	GA	GAv	Pts	Promotion or relegation
1	Birmingham (C, P)	42	24	10	8	79	38	2.079	58	Promotion to the Frst Division
2	Cardiff City (P)	42	24	10	8	59	32	1.844	58	Promotion to the Frst Division
3	Bristol City	42	19	13	10	49	29	1.690	51	
4	Blackpool	42	20	10	12	54	42	1.286	50	
5	West Ham United	42	19	10	13	51	30	1.700	48	
6	Notts County	42	18	11	13	55	40	1.375	47	
7	Clapton Orient	42	16	13	13	43	42	1.024	45	
8	South Shields	42	17	10	15	61	46	1.326	44	
9	Fulham	42	16	10	16	43	47	0.915	42	
10	The Wednesday	42	15	11	16	48	48	1.000	41	
11	Bury	42	15	10	17	45	49	0.918	40	
12	Leicester City	42	12	16	14	39	46	0.848	40	
13	Hull City	42	10	20	12	43	53	0.811	40	
14	Leeds United	42	14	10	18	40	45	0.889	38	
15	Wolverhampton Wanderers	42	16	6	20	49	66	0.742	38	
16	Barnsley	42	10	16	16	48	50	0.960	36	
17	Port Vale	42	11	14	17	43	49	0.878	36	
18	Nottingham Forest	42	12	12	18	48	55	0.873	36	
19	Rotherham County	42	12	12	18	37	53	0.698	36	
20	Stoke	42	12	11	19	46	56	0.821	35	
21	Coventry City	42	12	11	19	39	70	0.557	35	
22	Stockport County (R)	42	9	12	21	42	75	0.560	30	Relegation to the Third Division North

(C) Champions; (P) Promoted; (R) Relegated

=== Third Division ===
Pos	Team	Pld	W	D	L	GF	GA	GR	Pts	Promotion
1	Crystal Palace (C, P)	42	24	11	7	70	34	2.059	59	Promotion to the Second Division
2	Southampton	42	19	16	7	64	28	2.286	54	
3	Queens Park Rangers	42	22	9	11	61	32	1.906	53	
4	Swindon Town	42	21	10	11	73	49	1.490	52	
5	Swansea Town	42	18	15	9	56	45	1.244	51	
6	Watford	42	20	8	14	59	44	1.341	48	
7	Millwall	42	18	11	13	42	30	1.400	47	
8	Merthyr Town	42	15	15	12	60	49	1.224	45	
9	Luton Town	42	16	12	14	61	56	1.089	44	
10	Bristol Rovers	42	18	7	17	68	57	1.193	43	
11	Plymouth Argyle	42	11	21	10	35	34	1.029	43	
12	Portsmouth	42	12	15	15	46	48	0.958	39	
13	Grimsby Town	42	15	9	18	49	59	0.831	39	Transferred to the Third Division North
14	Northampton Town	42	15	8	19	59	75	0.787	38	
15	Newport County	42	14	9	19	43	64	0.672	37	
16	Norwich City	42	10	16	16	44	53	0.830	36	
17	Southend United	42	14	8	20	44	61	0.721	36	
18	Brighton & Hove Albion	42	14	8	20	42	61	0.689	36	
19	Exeter City	42	10	15	17	39	54	0.722	35	
20	Reading	42	12	7	23	42	59	0.712	31	
21	Brentford	42	9	12	21	42	67	0.627	30	Re-elected
22	Gillingham	42	8	12	22	34	74	0.459	28	Re-elected

Source: fchd.info
(C) Champions; (P) Promoted

=== Top goalscorers ===
First Division

- Joe Smith (Bolton Wanderers) – 38 goals

Second Division

- Syd Puddefoot (West Ham United) – 29 goals

Third Division

- John Conner (Crystal Palace), Ernie Simms (Luton Town) and George Whitworth (Northampton Town) – 28 goals
