= 2021–22 Crystal Palace F.C. season =

English football club season

Crystal Palace
2021–22 season
- Owner: Steve Parish; Josh Harris; David Blitzer; John Textor
- Chairman: Steve Parish
- Manager: Patrick Vieira
- Stadium: Selhurst Park
- Premier League: 12th
- FA Cup: Semi-finals
- EFL Cup: Second round
- Top goalscorer: League: Wilfried Zaha (14); All: Wilfried Zaha (15)
Home colours	Away colours	Third colours

The 2021–22 season was Crystal Palace's ninth consecutive season in the Premier League (extending their longest ever spell in the top division of English football) and the 116th year in their history. This season, Palace participated in the Premier League, FA Cup and EFL Cup. The season covers the period from 1 July 2021 to 30 June 2022.

== Squad ==
Squad no.	Name	Nationality	Date of birth (age)
Goalkeepers
1	Jack Butland	(England)	10 March 1993 (aged 28)
13	Vicente Guaita	(Spain)	10 January 1987 (aged 34)
19	Remi Matthews	(England)	10 February 1994 (aged 27)
Defenders
2	Joel Ward	(England)	29 October 1989 (aged 31)
3	Tyrick Mitchell	(England)	1 September 1999 (aged 21)
5	James Tomkins	(England)	29 March 1989 (aged 32)
6	Marc Guéhi	(England)	13 July 2000 (aged 21)
16	Joachim Andersen	(Denmark)	31 May 1996 (aged 25)
17	Nathaniel Clyne	(England)	5 April 1991 (aged 30)
34	Martin Kelly	(England)	27 April 1990 (aged 31)
36	Nathan Ferguson	(England)	6 October 2000 (aged 20)
43	Reece Hannam	(England)	19 September 2000 (aged 20)
45	Tayo Adaramola	(Republic of Ireland)	14 November 2003 (aged 17)
Midfielders
4	Luka Milivojević (c)	(Serbia)	7 April 1991 (aged 30)
7	Michael Olise	(France)	12 December 2001 (aged 19)
8	Cheikhou Kouyaté	(Senegal)	21 December 1989 (aged 31)
10	Eberechi Eze	(England)	29 June 1998 (aged 23)
12	Will Hughes	(England)	17 April 1995 (aged 26)
15	Jeffrey Schlupp	(Ghana)	23 December 1992 (aged 28)
18	James McArthur	(Scotland)	7 October 1987 (aged 33)
23	Conor Gallagher (on loan from Chelsea)	(England)	6 February 2000 (aged 21)
44	Jaïro Riedewald	(Netherlands)	9 September 1996 (aged 24)
49	Jesurun Rak-Sakyi	(England)	5 October 2002 (aged 18)
Forwards
9	Jordan Ayew	(Ghana)	11 September 1991 (aged 29)
11	Wilfried Zaha	(Ivory Coast)	10 November 1992 (aged 28)
14	Jean-Philippe Mateta	(France)	28 June 1997 (aged 24)
20	Christian Benteke	(Belgium)	3 December 1990 (aged 30)
22	Odsonne Édouard	(France)	16 January 1998 (aged 23)
40	Scott Banks	(Scotland)	26 September 2001 (aged 19)

Last updated: 3 March 2021.
Source: Crystal Palace F.C.

== Managerial changes ==
On 4 July, Patrick Vieira was appointed as Palace's new manager on a three-year deal, replacing Roy Hodgson.

== Pre-season friendlies ==
Palace announced they would have a friendly matches against Portsmouth, Walsall, Ipswich Town, Charlton Athletic, Reading and Watford as part of their pre-season preparations.

16 July 2021 Friendly	Crystal Palace	Cancelled	Portsmouth	Burton upon Trent
12:00 BST				Stadium: St George's Park National Football Centre
Note: Match was later cancelled.

17 July 2021 Friendly	Walsall	0–1	Crystal Palace	Bescot
13:00 BST		Report	Zaha 41'	Stadium: Banks' Stadium

24 July 2021 Friendly	Ipswich Town	0–1	Crystal Palace	Ipswich
15:00 BST		Report	Zaha 60' (pen.)	Stadium: Portman Road

27 July 2021 Friendly	Crystal Palace	2–2	Charlton Athletic	Selhurst
19:00 BST	Rak-Sakyi 15'; Banks 75'	Report	Stockley 38'; Davison 79'	Stadium: Selhurst Park

31 July 2021 Friendly	Reading	1–3	Crystal Palace	Reading
15:00 BST	Swift 67'		Mateta 55' (pen.); Ayew 80'; Banks 90+3'	Stadium: Madejski Stadium; Referee: Keith Stroud

7 August 2021 Friendly	Crystal Palace	3–1	Watford	Selhurst
15:00 BST	Zaha 30' (pen.), 54'; Benteke 86'		Deeney 83'	Stadium: Selhurst Park

== Competitions ==
=== Premier League ===
==== League table ====
Pos	Team	Pld	W	D	L	GF	GA	GD	Pts
10	Wolverhampton Wanderers	38	15	6	17	38	43	−5	51
11	Newcastle United	38	13	10	15	44	62	−18	49
12	Crystal Palace	38	11	15	12	50	46	+4	48
13	Brentford	38	13	7	18	48	56	−8	46
14	Aston Villa	38	13	6	19	52	54	−2	45

Source: Premier League
Rules for classification: 1) Points; 2) Goal difference; 3) Goals scored; 4) If the champions, relegated teams or qualified teams for UEFA competitions cannot be determined by rules 1 to 3, rules 4.1 to 4.3 are applied – 4.1) Points gained in head-to-head record between such teams; 4.2) Away goals scored in head-to-head record between such teams; 4.3) Play-offs

==== Results summary ====
Overall								Home						Away					
Pld	W	D	L	GF	GA	GD	Pts	W	D	L	GF	GA	GD	W	D	L	GF	GA	GD
38	11	15	12	50	46	+4	48	7	8	4	24	17	+7	4	7	8	26	29	−3

==== Results by matchday ====
Matchday	1	2	3	4	5	6	7	8	9	10	11	12	13	14	15	16	17	18	19	20	21	22	23	24	25	26	27	28	29	30	31	32	33	34	35	36	37	38
Ground	A	H	A	H	A	H	H	A	H	A	H	A	H	A	A	H	H	A (Note: Match 18 was postponed due to COVID-19 and played between matches 26 and 27)	A	H	H	A	H	A	A	H	H	A	H	H	A	A	H	A	H	A	A	H
Result	L	D	D	W	L	D	D	D	D	W	W	D	L	L	L	W	D	W	L	W	L	D	L	D	D	L	D	W	D	W	L	L	D	W	W	D	L	W
Position	18	14	14	11	14	15	14	14	15	13	10	10	11	11	14	12	11	11	12	12	12	13	13	13	13	13	11	10	11	9	10	14	14	12	10	13	13	12

Source: Statto.com
A = Away; H = Home; W = Win; D = Draw; L = Loss

==== Matches ====
The league fixtures were announced on 16 June 2021.

14 August 2021 1	Chelsea	3–0	Crystal Palace	Fulham
15:00 BST	Alonso 27'; Pulisic 40'; Chalobah 58'	Report		Stadium: Stamford Bridge; Attendance: 38,965; Referee: Jonathan Moss

21 August 2021 2	Crystal Palace	0–0	Brentford	Selhurst
15:00 BST		Report		Stadium: Selhurst Park; Attendance: 23,091; Referee: Martin Atkinson

28 August 2021 3	West Ham United	2–2	Crystal Palace	Stratford
15:00 BST	Fornals 39'; Antonio 68'	Report	Gallagher 58', 70'	Stadium: London Stadium; Attendance: 59,751; Referee: Stuart Attwell

11 September 2021 4	Crystal Palace	3–0	Tottenham Hotspur	Selhurst
12:30 BST	Zaha 76' (pen.); Édouard 84', 90+2'	Report	Tanganga (yellow card) 53' (yellow-red card) 58'	Stadium: Selhurst Park; Attendance: 22,704; Referee: Jonathan Moss

18 September 2021 5	Liverpool	3–0	Crystal Palace	Liverpool
15:00 BST	Mané 43'; Salah 78'; Keïta 89'	Report		Stadium: Anfield; Attendance: 52,985; Referee: Andy Madley

27 September 2021 6	Crystal Palace	1–1	Brighton & Hove Albion	Selhurst
20:00 BST	Zaha 45+2' (pen.)	Report	Maupay 90+5'	Stadium: Selhurst Park; Attendance: 22,975; Referee: Andre Marriner

3 October 2021 7	Crystal Palace	2–2	Leicester City	Selhurst
14:00 BST	Olise 61'; Schlupp 72'	Report	Iheanacho 31'; Vardy 37'	Stadium: Selhurst Park; Attendance: 22,445; Referee: Anthony Taylor

18 October 2021 8	Arsenal	2–2	Crystal Palace	Holloway
20:00 BST	Aubameyang 8'; Lacazette 90+5'	Report	Benteke 50'; Édouard 73'	Stadium: Emirates Stadium; Attendance: 59,475; Referee: Mike Dean

23 October 2021 9	Crystal Palace	1–1	Newcastle United	Selhurst
15:00 BST	Benteke 56'	Report	Wilson 65'	Stadium: Selhurst Park; Attendance: 24,609; Referee: Darren England

30 October 2021 10	Manchester City	0–2	Crystal Palace	Manchester
15:00 BST	Laporte (red card) 45+2'	Report	Zaha 6'; Gallagher 88'	Stadium: Etihad Stadium; Attendance: 53,014; Referee: Andre Marriner

6 November 2021 11	Crystal Palace	2–0	Wolverhampton Wanderers	Selhurst
15:00 GMT	Zaha 61'; Gallagher 78'	Report		Stadium: Selhurst Park; Attendance: 24,390; Referee: Graham Scott

20 November 2021 12	Burnley	3–3	Crystal Palace	Burnley
15:00 GMT	Mee 19'; Wood 27'; Cornet 49'	Report	Benteke 8', 36'; Guéhi 42'	Stadium: Turf Moor; Attendance: 18,028; Referee: Simon Hooper

27 November 2021 13	Crystal Palace	1–2	Aston Villa	Selhurst
15:00 GMT	Guéhi 90+5'	Report	Targett 15'; McGinn 86'	Stadium: Selhurst Park; Attendance: 25,203; Referee: Michael Salisbury

30 November 2021 14	Leeds United	1–0	Crystal Palace	Leeds
20:15 GMT	Raphinha 90+3' (pen.)	Report		Stadium: Elland Road; Attendance: 35,558; Referee: Kevin Friend

5 December 2021 15	Manchester United	1–0	Crystal Palace	Manchester
14:00 GMT	Fred 77'	Report		Stadium: Old Trafford; Attendance: 73,172; Referee: Craig Pawson

12 December 2021 16	Crystal Palace	3–1	Everton	Selhurst
16:30 GMT	Gallagher 41', 90+3'; Tomkins 62'	Report	Rondón 70'	Stadium: Selhurst Park; Attendance: 24,066; Referee: Andrew Madley

15 December 2021 17	Crystal Palace	2–2	Southampton	Selhurst
19:30 GMT	Zaha 2'; Ayew 65'	Report	Ward-Prowse 32'; Broja 36'	Stadium: Selhurst Park; Attendance: 22,861; Referee: Simon Hooper

26 December 2021 19	Tottenham Hotspur	3–0	Crystal Palace	Tottenham
15:00 GMT	Kane 32'; Lucas 34'; Son Heung-min 74'	Report	Zaha (yellow card) 26' (yellow-red card) 37'	Stadium: Tottenham Hotspur Stadium; Attendance: 40,539; Referee: Jonathan Moss

28 December 2021 20	Crystal Palace	3–0	Norwich City	Selhurst
15:00 GMT	Édouard 8' (pen.); Mateta 38'; Schlupp 42'	Report		Stadium: Selhurst Park; Attendance: 24,433; Referee: Paul Tierney

1 January 2022 21	Crystal Palace	2–3	West Ham United	Selhurst
17:30 GMT	Édouard 83'; Olise 90'	Report	Antonio 22'; Lanzini 25', 45+5' (pen.)	Stadium: Selhurst Park; Attendance: 24,351; Referee: Darren England

14 January 2022 22	Brighton & Hove Albion	1–1	Crystal Palace	Falmer
20:00 GMT	Groß (penalty missed) 38'; Andersen 87' (o.g.)	Report	Gallagher 69'	Stadium: Falmer Stadium; Attendance: 30,675; Referee: Robert Jones

23 January 2022 23	Crystal Palace	1–3	Liverpool	Selhurst
14:00 GMT	Édouard 55'	Report	van Dijk 8'; Oxlade-Chamberlain 32'; Fabinho 89' (pen.)	Stadium: Selhurst Park; Attendance: 25,002; Referee: Kevin Friend

9 February 2022 24	Norwich City	1–1	Crystal Palace	Norwich
19:45 GMT	Pukki 1'	Report	Zaha 60' (penalty missed) 62'	Stadium: Carrow Road; Attendance: 26,652; Referee: Paul Tierney

12 February 2022 25	Brentford	0–0	Crystal Palace	Brentford
15:00 GMT		Report		Stadium: Brentford Community Stadium; Attendance: 16,958; Referee: Simon Hooper

19 February 2022 26	Crystal Palace	0–1	Chelsea	Selhurst
15:00 GMT		Report	Ziyech 89'	Stadium: Selhurst Park; Attendance: 25,109; Referee: David Coote

23 February 2022 18	Watford	1–4	Crystal Palace	Watford
19:30 GMT	Sissoko 18'	Report	Mateta 15'; Gallagher 42'; Zaha 85', 90'	Stadium: Vicarage Road; Attendance: 20,012; Referee: Andre Marriner
Note: The match, originally scheduled for 18 December 2021, was postponed due to a COVID-19 outbreak within Watford's squad.

26 February 2022 27	Crystal Palace	1–1	Burnley	Selhurst
15:00 GMT	Schlupp 9'	Report	Milivojević 46' (o.g.)	Stadium: Selhurst Park; Attendance: 24,203; Referee: Jonathan Moss

5 March 2022 28	Wolverhampton Wanderers	0–2	Crystal Palace	Wolverhampton
15:00 GMT		Report	Mateta 19'; Zaha 34' (pen.)	Stadium: Molineux; Attendance: 31,395; Referee: Andrew Madley

14 March 2022 29	Crystal Palace	0–0	Manchester City	Selhurst
20:00 GMT		Report		Stadium: Selhurst Park; Attendance: 25,309; Referee: Martin Atkinson

4 April 2022 30	Crystal Palace	3–0	Arsenal	Selhurst
20:00 BST	Mateta 16'; Ayew 24'; Zaha 74' (pen.)	Report		Stadium: Selhurst Park; Attendance: 25,149; Referee: Paul Tierney

10 April 2022 31	Leicester City	2–1	Crystal Palace	Leicester
14:00 BST	Lookman 39'; Dewsbury-Hall 45'	Report	Zaha (penalty missed) 65', 66'	Stadium: King Power Stadium; Attendance: 31,896; Referee: Robert Jones

20 April 2022 32	Newcastle United	1–0	Crystal Palace	Newcastle upon Tyne
19:45 BST	Almirón 32'	Report		Stadium: St James' Park; Attendance: 51,938; Referee: Tony Harrington

25 April 2022 33	Crystal Palace	0–0	Leeds United	Selhurst
20:00 BST		Report		Stadium: Selhurst Park; Attendance: 25,357; Referee: Darren England

30 April 2022 34	Southampton	1–2	Crystal Palace	Southampton
15:00 BST	Romeu 9'	Report	Eze 60'; Zaha 90+2'	Stadium: St Mary's Stadium; Attendance: 31,359; Referee: Jarred Gillett

7 May 2022 35	Crystal Palace	1–0	Watford	Selhurst
15:00 BST	Zaha 31' (pen.)	Report		Stadium: Selhurst Park; Attendance: 24,622; Referee: Graham Scott

15 May 2022 36	Aston Villa	1–1	Crystal Palace	Aston
14:00 BST	Watkins 69'	Report	Schlupp 81'	Stadium: Villa Park; Attendance: 41,136; Referee: Chris Kavanagh

19 May 2022 37	Everton	3–2	Crystal Palace	Walton
19:45 BST	Keane 54'; Richarlison 75'; Calvert-Lewin 85'	Report	Mateta 21'; Ayew 36'	Stadium: Goodison Park; Attendance: 38,448; Referee: Anthony Taylor

22 May 2022 38	Crystal Palace	1–0	Manchester United	Selhurst
16:00 BST	Zaha 37'	Report		Stadium: Selhurst Park; Attendance: 25,434; Referee: Martin Atkinson

=== FA Cup ===
Palace were drawn away to Millwall in the third round.

8 January 2022 Third round	Millwall	1–2	Crystal Palace	Bermondsey
12:45 GMT	Afobe 18'	Report	Olise 46'; Mateta 58'	Stadium: The Den; Attendance: 16,746; Referee: Anthony Taylor

5 February 2022 Fourth round	Crystal Palace	2–0	Hartlepool United	Selhurst
15:00 GMT	Guéhi 4'; Olise 22'	Report		Stadium: Selhurst Park; Attendance: 25,073; Referee: Peter Bankes

1 March 2022 Fifth round	Crystal Palace	2–1	Stoke City	Selhurst
19:30 GMT	Kouyaté 53'; Riedewald 82'	Report	Tymon 58'	Stadium: Selhurst Park; Attendance: 25,420; Referee: Robert Jones

20 March 2022 Quarter-finals	Crystal Palace	4–0	Everton	Selhurst
12:30 GMT	Guéhi 25'; Mateta 41'; Zaha 79'; Hughes 88'	Report		Stadium: Selhurst Park; Attendance: 25,400; Referee: Stuart Attwell

17 April 2022 Semi-finals	Chelsea	2–0	Crystal Palace	London
16:30 BST	Loftus-Cheek 65'; Mount 76'	Report		Stadium: Wembley Stadium; Attendance: 76,238; Referee: Anthony Taylor

=== EFL Cup ===
Palace entered the competition in the second round and were drawn away to Watford.

24 August 2021 Second round	Watford	1–0	Crystal Palace	Watford
19:45 BST	Fletcher 86'	Report		Stadium: Vicarage Road; Attendance: 9,011; Referee: Tim Robinson

== Transfers ==
=== Transfers in ===
Date	Position	Nationality	Player	From	Fee	Ref.
1 July 2021	CM	(United States)	Jacob Montes	(United States) Georgetown Hoyas	Free transfer	
1 July 2021	CM	(Cyprus)	Jack Roles	Tottenham Hotspur	Free transfer	(Note: Roles had a trial with Crystal Palace then was signed by the club, according to Palace website he signed on 1 July 2021.)
8 July 2021	AM	(France)	Michael Olise	Reading	£8,000,000	
13 July 2021	GK	(England)	Remi Matthews	Sunderland	Free transfer	
17 July 2021	FW	(Portugal)	Adler Nascimento	Peterborough United	Tribunal	
18 July 2021	DF	(England)	Marc Guéhi	Chelsea	Undisclosed	
28 July 2021	DF	(Denmark)	Joachim Andersen	(France) Lyon	Undisclosed	
16 August 2021	CB	(Republic of Ireland)	Jake O'Brien	(Republic of Ireland) Cork City	Undisclosed	(Note: O'Brien had been on loan from Cork City since January 2021)
28 August 2021	MF	(England)	Will Hughes	Watford	£6,000,000	
31 August 2021	FW	(France)	Odsonne Édouard	(Scotland) Celtic	Undisclosed	
11 January 2022	CM	(Republic of Ireland)	Killian Phillips	(Republic of Ireland) Drogheda United	Undisclosed	
15 January 2022	RB	(England)	Joshua Addae	Langley	Undisclosed	
31 January 2022	CF	(France)	Jean-Philippe Mateta	(Germany) Mainz 05	£9,000,000	(Note: Mateta had been on loan with the club since January 2021)
31 January 2022	CF	(England)	Luke Plange	Derby County	£1,000,000	(Note: After signing, Plange was loaned back to Derby County for the remainder of the season)

=== Loans in ===
Date from	Position	Nationality	Player	From	Date until	Ref.
30 July 2021	CM	(England)	Conor Gallagher	Chelsea	End of season	

=== Loans out ===
Date from	Position	Nationality	Player	To	Date until	Ref.
9 July 2021	AM	(Wales)	Sion Spence	Bristol Rovers	End of season	
1 August 2021	AM	(United States)	Jacob Montes	(Belgium) Waasland-Beveren	13 January 2022 (Note: On 13 January, Montes' loan at Waasland-Beveren was terminated to facilitate a new loan at RWD Molenbeek.)	
4 January 2022	CB	(Republic of Ireland)	Jake O'Brien	Swindon Town	End of season	
13 January 2022	AM	(United States)	Jacob Montes	(Belgium) RWD Molenbeek	End of season	
15 January 2022	DM	(Wales)	James Taylor	Tonbridge Angels	End of season	
26 January 2022	CM	(England)	Luke Dreher	Bromley	End of season	
26 January 2022	CF	(England)	Robert Street	(Wales) Newport County	End of season	
31 January 2022	MF	(England)	Dylan Thisleton	Farnborough	End of season	
31 January 2022	DF	(England)	Danny Imray	Chelmsford City	End of season	

=== Transfers out ===
Date	Position	Nationality	Player	To	Fee	Ref.
30 June 2021	AM	(Portugal)	Brandon Aveiro	Unattached (Note: Aveiro later joined Queens Park Rangers)	Released	
30 June 2021	RB	(England)	Lion Bello	Unattached	Released	
30 June 2021	CB	(England)	Lewis Bryon	Unattached	Released	
30 June 2021	CB	(England)	Gary Cahill	Unattached (Note: Cahill later joined Bournemouth)	Released	
30 June 2021	CB	(England)	Scott Dann	Unattached (Note: Dann later joined Reading)	Released	
30 June 2021	AM	(Republic of Ireland)	Kian Flanagan	Unattached (Note: Flanagan later jointed Barnet)	Released	
30 June 2021	RW	(Colombia)	Kevin Gonzalez	Unattached	Released	
30 June 2021	RW	(England)	Harlem Hale	Unattached	Released	
30 June 2021	MF	(England)	Kyran Henderson	Unattached	Released	
30 June 2021	GK	(Republic of Ireland)	Stephen Henderson	Unattached (Note: Henderson later joined Charlton Athletic)	Released	
30 June 2021	GK	(Wales)	Wayne Hennessey	Unattached (Note: Hennessey later joined Burnley)	Released	
30 June 2021	CB	(England)	Lewis Hobbs	Unattached (Note: Hobbs later joined Hendon)	Released	
30 June 2021	CB	(England)	Cameron Jessup	Unattached (Note: Jessup later joined Sunderland)	Released	
30 June 2021	GK	(England)	Rohan Luthra	Unattached (Note: Luthra later joined Cardiff City)	Released	
30 June 2021	CF	(England)	Alfie Matthews	Unattached	Released	
30 June 2021	CM	(Republic of Ireland)	James McCarthy	Unattached (Note: McCarthy later joined Celtic)	Released	
30 June 2021	GK	(England)	Jacob Russell	Unattached (Note: Jacob Russell later joined Ramsgate)	Released	
30 June 2021	RB	(England)	Jude Russell	Unattached (Note: Jude Russell later joined Brentford)	Released	
30 June 2021	CB	(France)	Mamadou Sakho	Unattached (Note: Sakho later joined Montpellier)	Released	
30 June 2021	RB	(England)	Rowan Smith	Unattached	Released	
30 June 2021	RW	(England)	Andros Townsend	Unattached (Note: Townsend later joined Everton)	Released	
30 June 2021	LB	(Netherlands)	Patrick van Aanholt	Unattached (Note: van Aanholt later joined Galatasaray)	Released	
30 June 2021	CF	(England)	Connor Wickham	Unattached (Note: Wickham later joined Preston North End)	Released	
30 June 2021	CB	(England)	Sam Woods	Unattached (Note: Woods later joined Barnet)	Released	
30 June 2021	MF	(England)	Ellison Wright	Unattached	Released	
6 July 2021	CB	(Croatia)	Nikola Tavares	Wealdstone	Free transfer	
7 July 2021	MF	(England)	Richard Faakye	(Wales) Swansea City	Free transfer	
13 August 2021	LW	(England)	Brandon Pierrick	(Denmark) Vejle	Undisclosed	
14 January 2022	CB	(Australia)	Jay Rich-Baghuelou	Accrington Stanley	Undisclosed	
26 January 2022	GK	(Northern Ireland)	Oliver Webber	Portsmouth	Undisclosed	
27 January 2022	CM	(Cyprus)	Jack Roles	Free agent	Released	

== Statistics ==
=== Appearances ===
Last updated: 22 May 2022.
Source: 11v11.com

No.	Pos.	Player	Premier League		FA Cup		EFL Cup		Total	
No.	Pos.	Player	Apps	Goals	Apps	Goals	Apps	Goals	Apps	Goals
Goalkeepers
1	GK	(England) Jack Butland	8+1	0	5	0	1	0	14+1	0
13	GK	(Spain) Vicente Guaita	30	0	0	0	0	0	30	0
19	GK	(England) Remi Matthews	0	0	0	0	0	0	0	0
Defenders
2	DF	(England) Joel Ward	27+1	0	3	0	1	0	31+1	0
3	DF	(England) Tyrick Mitchell	35+1	0	4	0	0+1	0	39+2	0
5	DF	(England) James Tomkins	6+2	1	0	0	1	0	7+2	1
6	DF	(England) Marc Guéhi	36	2	5	2	1	0	42	4
16	DF	(Denmark) Joachim Andersen	32+2	0	4	0	1	0	37+2	0
17	DF	(England) Nathaniel Clyne	15+1	0	2+2	0	0	0	17+3	0
34	DF	(England) Martin Kelly	0	0	1	0	0	0	1	0
36	DF	(England) Nathan Ferguson	0+1	0	0	0	0	0	0+1	0
45	DF	(Republic of Ireland) Tayo Adaramola	0	0	1+1	0	0	0	1+1	0
Midfielders
4	MF	(Serbia) Luka Milivojević	9+6	0	1+4	0	0	0	10+10	0
7	MF	(France) Michael Olise	12+14	2	4+1	2	0	0	16+15	4
8	MF	(Senegal) Cheikhou Kouyaté	23+4	0	3	1	1	0	27+4	1
10	MF	(England) Eberechi Eze	6+7	1	4	0	0	0	10+7	1
12	MF	(England) Will Hughes	13+3	0	2+2	1	0	0	15+5	1
15	MF	(Ghana) Jeffrey Schlupp	20+12	4	3+1	0	1	0	24+13	4
18	MF	(Scotland) James McArthur	15+6	0	1	0	0+1	0	16+7	0
23	MF	(England) Conor Gallagher	33+1	8	3+1	0	1	0	37+2	8
44	MF	(Netherlands) Jaïro Riedewald	1+2	0	0+2	1	0	0	1+4	1
49	MF	(England) Jesurun Rak-Sakyi	1+1	0	0	0	0	0	1+1	0
Forwards
9	FW	(Ghana) Jordan Ayew	23+8	3	1+1	0	1	0	25+9	3
11	FW	(Ivory Coast) Wilfried Zaha	31+2	14	3	1	1	0	35+2	15
14	FW	(France) Jean-Philippe Mateta	13+9	5	5	2	1	0	19+9	7
20	FW	(Belgium) Christian Benteke	11+14	4	0+5	0	0+1	0	11+20	4
22	FW	(France) Odsonne Édouard	18+10	6	0+3	0	0	0	18+13	6

=== Goalscorers ===
The list is sorted by shirt number when total goals are equal.

Rnk	Pos	No.	Player	Premier League	FA Cup	EFL Cup	Total
1	FW	11	(Ivory Coast) Wilfried Zaha	14	1	0	15
2	MF	23	(England) Conor Gallagher	8	0	0	8
3	FW	14	(France) Jean-Philippe Mateta	5	2	0	7
4	FW	22	(France) Odsonne Édouard	6	0	0	6
5	DF	6	(England) Marc Guéhi	2	2	0	4
5	MF	7	(France) Michael Olise	2	2	0	4
5	MF	15	(Ghana) Jeffrey Schlupp	4	0	0	4
5	FW	20	(Belgium) Christian Benteke	4	0	0	4
9	FW	9	(Ghana) Jordan Ayew	3	0	0	3
10	DF	5	(England) James Tomkins	1	0	0	1
10	MF	8	(Senegal) Cheikhou Kouyaté	0	1	0	1
10	MF	10	(England) Eberechi Eze	1	0	0	1
10	MF	12	(England) Will Hughes	0	1	0	1
10	MF	44	(Netherlands) Jaïro Riedewald	0	1	0	1
Total				50	10	0	60

Last updated: 22 May 2022.
Source: 11v11.com

=== Clean sheets ===
The list is sorted by shirt number when total clean sheets are equal.

Rank	No.	Player	Premier League	FA Cup	EFL Cup	Total
1	13	(Spain) Vicente Guaita	11	0	0	11
2	1	(England) Jack Butland	1	2	0	3
Total			12	2	0	14

Last updated: 22 May 2022.
Source: premierleague.com

== See also ==
- 2021–22 in English football
- List of Crystal Palace F.C. seasons
