= Marc Guéhi =

Ivorian-English footballer (born 2000)

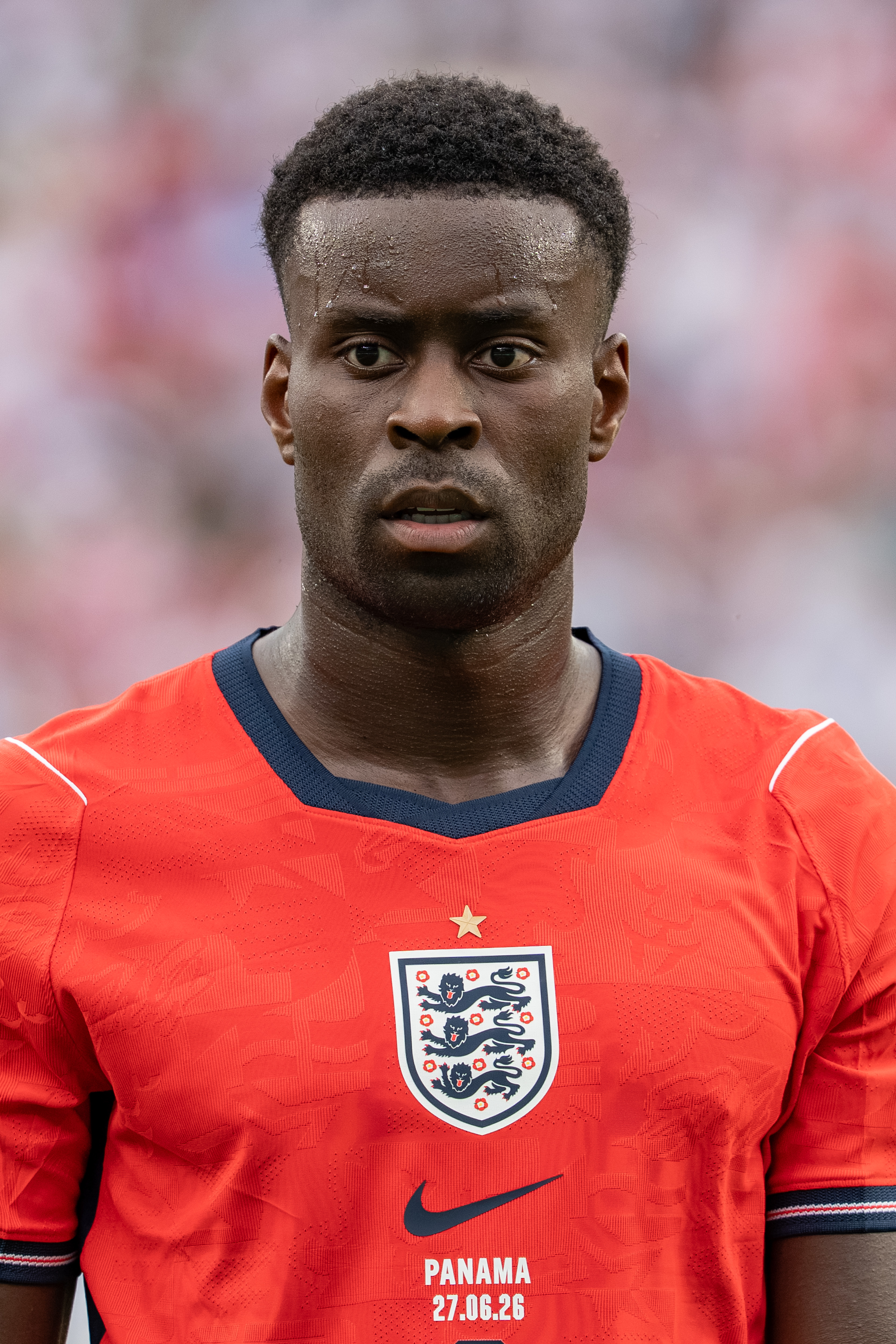
- Guéhi with England in 2026

Personal information
- Full name: Addji Keaninkin Marc-Israel Guéhi
- Date of birth: 13 July 2000 (age 26)
- Place of birth: Abidjan, Ivory Coast
- Height: 6 ft 0 in (1.83 m)
- Position: Centre-back

Team information
- Current team: Manchester City
- Number: 6

Youth career
- 2005–2007: Cray Wanderers
- 2007–2019: Chelsea

Senior career*
Years	Team	Apps	(Gls)
2019–2021	Chelsea	0	(0)
2020–2021	→ Swansea City (loan)	52	(0)
2021–2026	Crystal Palace	152	(8)
2026–	Manchester City	20	(2)

International career^{‡}
2015–2016	England U16	10	(2)
2016–2017	England U17	20	(2)
2017–2018	England U18	3	(0)
2018–2019	England U19	6	(2)
2019	England U20	3	(0)
2019–2021	England U21	16	(1)
2022–	England	41	(1)
Medal record
Men's football
Representing England
FIFA World Cup
Third place	2026 Canada–Mexico–US
UEFA European Championship
Runner-up	2024 Germany
FIFA U-17 World Cup
Winner	2017 India
UEFA European Under-17 Championship
Runner-up	2017 Croatia
- * Club domestic league appearances and goals as of 23:55, 20 September 2026 (UTC) ‡ National team caps and goals as of 16:10, 7 October 2026 (UTC)

Addji Keaninkin Marc-Israel Guéhi (/ˈɡeɪ.i/ GAY-ee; born 13 July 2000) is a professional footballer who plays as a centre-back for Premier League club Manchester City. Born in the Ivory Coast, he plays for the England national team.

Guéhi came through the youth system at Chelsea, making his first-team debut in 2019 before spending a season and a half on loan at Swansea City. He joined Crystal Palace in 2021 for £18 million, becoming the club's third-most expensive signing. He went on to make over 180 appearances for the club; appointed club captain in 2024, he led them to FA Cup and Community Shield titles in 2025. In January 2026, Guéhi joined Manchester City, winning a second consecutive FA Cup title in his first season with the side.

Guéhi represented England at youth level, and was a key part of their 2017 FIFA U-17 World Cup winning squad. He made his debut for the senior team in 2022, and was a starting member of the squads that were runners-up at UEFA Euro 2024 and third place at the 2026 FIFA World Cup.

== Early life ==
Addji Keaninkin Marc-Israel Guéhi was born on 13 July 2000 in Abidjan, Ivory Coast, and moved with his family to Lewisham, London, England, at the age of one. He attended St George's Church of England School in Gravesend, Kent. His father was a minister of a local church, meaning his childhood often focused on religion and education over football. He began playing in the Cray Wanderers youth system aged six and was coached by a scout from Premier League club Chelsea. After two years with the non-League club, he signed for Chelsea and progressed through the academy.

== Club career ==
=== Chelsea ===
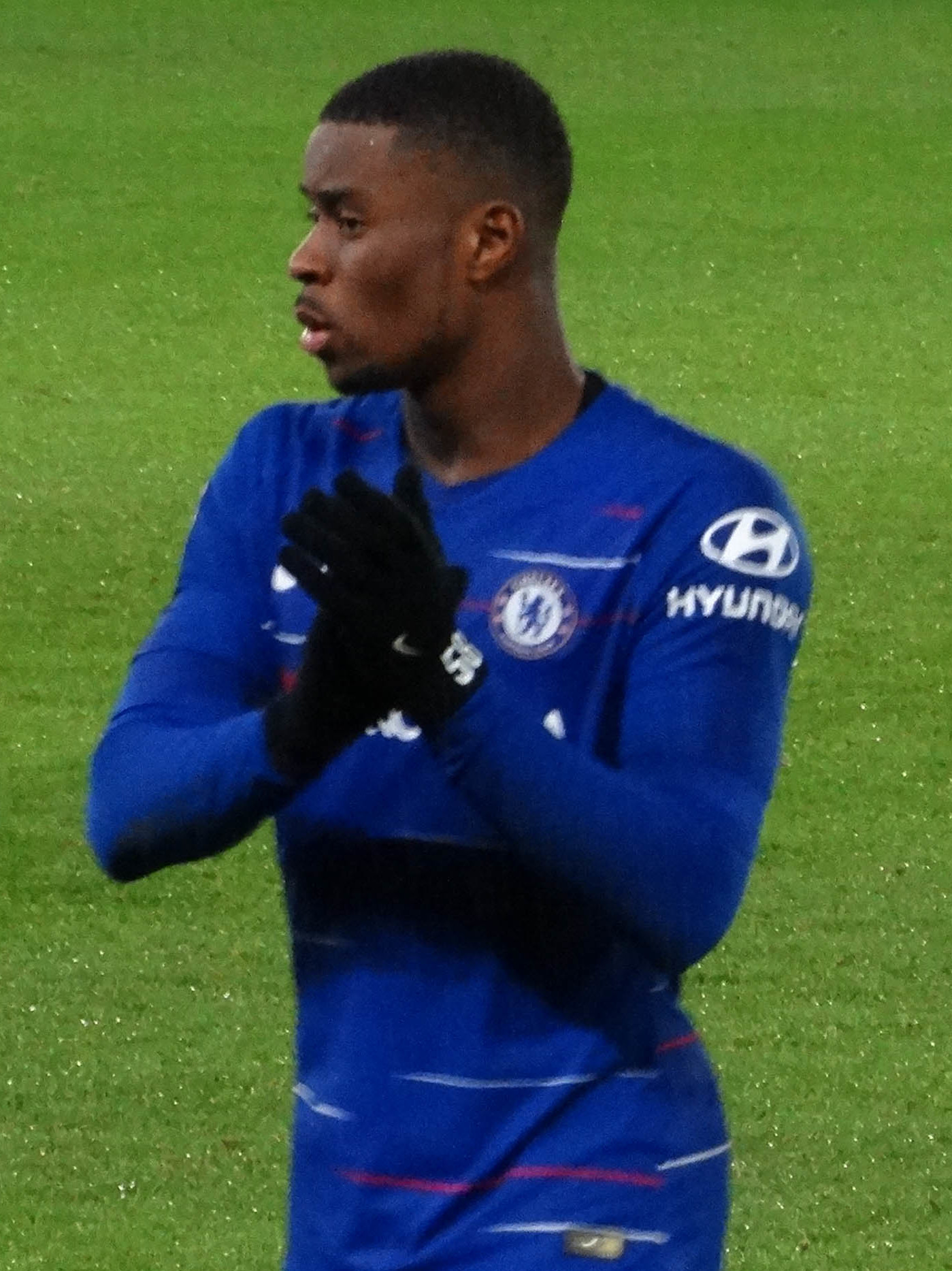
Guéhi playing for Chelsea in 2018

Progressing through the youth ranks, Guéhi regularly featured for the under-18s during their treble-winning campaign in 2017. In September 2017, he signed his first professional contract, for three years. The following season, he helped the under-18s win a quadruple and reach the final of the UEFA Youth League.

On 12 May 2019, Guéhi was named in a Premier League squad for the first time as a substitute in a 0–0 draw away to Leicester City. He featured as an unused substitute a further three times during the 2019–20 season. On 17 September, he was an unused substitute in a 1–0 defeat to Valencia in the UEFA Champions League. The following week, he made his professional debut in a 7–1 win against Grimsby Town in the EFL Cup third round. His second and final appearance for the club came in a 2–1 defeat to Manchester United in the fourth round on 30 October.

==== Loans to Swansea City ====
On 10 January 2020, Guéhi joined Championship club Swansea City on loan for the remainder of the 2019–20 season. The move saw him re-unite with Steve Cooper, who had previously managed him in England's 2017 FIFA U-17 World Cup winning squad. After being named as an unused substitute on two occasions, Guéhi made his debut in a 2–0 defeat to Stoke City on 25 January. He remained in the starting lineup for the next four games, but came under criticism after Swansea failed to win any of their last five games. Cooper backed the defender and stated "it's difficult for young players to make an instant impact".

Following a three-month pause due to the COVID-19 pandemic, Guéhi was named on the bench twice before returning as a late substitute in a 1–1 draw against Millwall. On 5 July, he made his first start in five months in a 2–1 win over Sheffield Wednesday. He started in all five of Swansea's remaining league matches and helped guide the team to sixth place and a play-off position. He featured in both legs of the semi-final as Swansea lost 3–2 on aggregate to Brentford.

On 26 August 2020, Guéhi returned to Swansea on loan for the 2020–21 season. He became a regular in defence with only four Swansea players appearing for more minutes throughout the campaign. Guéhi began the season with three consecutive clean sheets against Preston North End, Birmingham City and Wycombe Wanderers, and went on to keep a further 14 in the league as Swansea finished fourth. He played every minute of their play-off campaign, beating Barnsley 2–1 across the semi-finals before a 2–0 final defeat to Brentford.

=== Crystal Palace ===
==== 2021–2024: Early seasons ====
On 18 July 2021, Guéhi joined Crystal Palace on a five-year contract for a reported fee of £18 million, making him the club's third-most expensive signing of all-time, behind Christian Benteke and Mamadou Sakho. It was also reported that Chelsea had included sell-on incentives and the right to match any offers made for Guéhi in future.

On 20 November 2021, Guéhi scored the first senior goal of his career in a 3–3 draw with Burnley in the Premier League. He scored a consolation goal in a 2–1 loss to Aston Villa at Selhurst Park a week later, ensuring he had scored in back-to-back games. Overall, he made 42 appearances in his first season, forming a centre-back partnership with Joachim Andersen and starting in Palace's run to the FA Cup semi-final, as well as scoring goals in wins against Hartlepool United and Everton along the way.

In the following campaign, the 2022–23 season, Guéhi started all but one of Crystal Palace's games in all competitions, as well as scoring a goal in a 5–1 routing of Leeds United on 9 April 2023. He spent several months of the 2023–24 season out with a knee injury, though returned for the final few matches of the season.

==== 2024–2025: Captaincy and FA Cup win ====
Amidst interest and numerous bids rejected from Newcastle United, Guéhi was named club captain ahead of the 2024–25 season, replacing Joel Ward. He scored a career-best three Premier League goals over the season, against Everton, Wolverhampton Wanderers and Leicester City; he also scored three own goals, in a 3–1 win at rivals Brighton & Hove Albion, and both home and away against Newcastle, becoming the second player in Premier League history to do so home and away against an opponent in a single campaign after Jamie Carragher against Tottenham Hotspur in 1998–99. He was also sent off for the first time in his career on 5 April 2025, receiving a second yellow card in stoppage time in a 2–1 home win against Brighton.

On 17 May, Guéhi captained Crystal Palace to the club's first ever major trophy, starting in a 1–0 victory over Manchester City in the 2025 FA Cup final; he lifted the trophy alongside previous captain Ward, having been substituted off with an injury in the second half.

==== 2025–2026: Community Shield win and final season ====
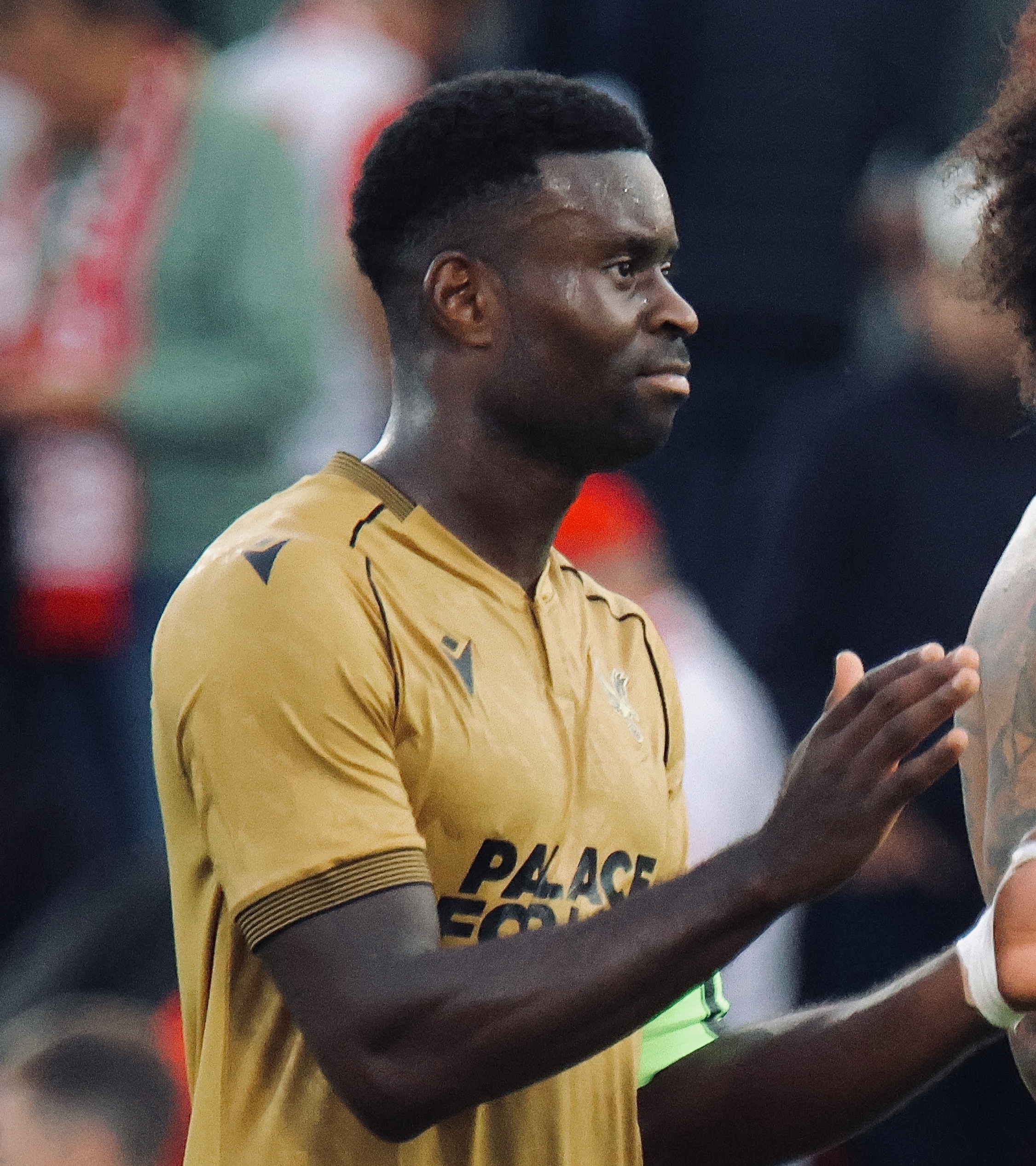
Guéhi playing for Crystal Palace in 2025

On 10 August 2025, Guéhi captained Palace in the 2025 FA Community Shield against Liverpool, later lifting his second trophy following Palace's win in the penalty shootout after a 2–2 draw. Amid links with a transfer to Liverpool the next day, Palace chairman Steve Parish stated that Guéhi, with a year left on his contract and no interest in an extension, would likely be sold to avoid the club losing him for free the following summer. However, Palace manager Oliver Glasner contradicted Parish's words, stating the following week that Guéhi "[had] to stay" at the club.

In spite of further speculation towards the end of the transfer window, Guéhi started in a 3–0 win at Aston Villa on 30 August, scoring Palace's second goal, a "stunning curling effort" that went on to be nominated for Premier League Goal of the Month; his teammate Dean Henderson was later shown urging him to say goodbye to the Palace fans after the full-time whistle. Following the match, Glasner reiterated that Palace could not sell Guéhi. The following day, which was transfer deadline day, Liverpool agreed a £35 million deal with Palace for Guéhi, who completed an hour-long medical and was on the verge of signing a five-year contract with the Premier League champions. However, the transfer dramatically collapsed minutes before the deadline, with Palace, having been unable to secure an adequate replacement in time, pulling out of the deal. It was reported by some outlets that Glasner had threatened to resign from his position as manager had Guéhi been sold. Guéhi was later nominated for Premier League Player of the Month for August 2025.

On 7 December, Guéhi scored an 87th-minute winner against Fulham to seal a 2–1 win for Palace. His last goal for Palace was a 95th-minute equaliser against Arsenal in the EFL Cup on 23 December to seal a 1–1 draw, though Arsenal went on to triumph on penalties. On 10 January 2026, he played all 90 minutes as Palace's FA Cup defence came to an end in an historic 2–1 defeat to sixth division side Macclesfield, and was later seen conversing with supporters after the full-time whistle; the match ended up being his final game for Crystal Palace.

=== Manchester City ===
On 19 January 2026, Manchester City completed the signing of Guéhi for a reported fee of £20 million. On 24 January, Guéhi made his debut for the club, starting and keeping a clean sheet in a 2–0 win over Wolverhampton Wanderers. On 14 February, Guéhi scored his first City goal as a substitute for John Stones in a 2–0 home win over EFL League Two side Salford City in the FA Cup fourth round. On 12 April, Guéhi scored his first Premier League goal for City in a 3–0 win at Stamford Bridge against his former club Chelsea.

On 16 May 2026, Guéhi played the full match in the 2026 FA Cup final, becoming the fourth player in history to win the competition in consecutive seasons with different clubs.

== International career ==
=== Youth career ===
Guéhi captained the England national under-17 team at the UEFA European Under-17 Championship in May 2017. He played in every match at the competition, scoring an own goal in the opening 3–1 win against Norway. England went on to lose on penalties to Spain in the final. In October 2017, he was included in the squad for the 2017 FIFA U-17 World Cup. On 28 October, he scored the fourth goal in a 5–2 victory against Spain as England were crowned world champions.

In October 2018, Guéhi progressed to the England under-19 team and scored in a friendly against Portugal. He also scored in 2019 Elite Qualifiers against the Czech Republic and Denmark.

In August 2019, Guéhi was included in an England under-21 squad for the first time. On 6 September 2021, Lee Carsley confirmed Guéhi as captain of the under-21s.

=== Senior career ===
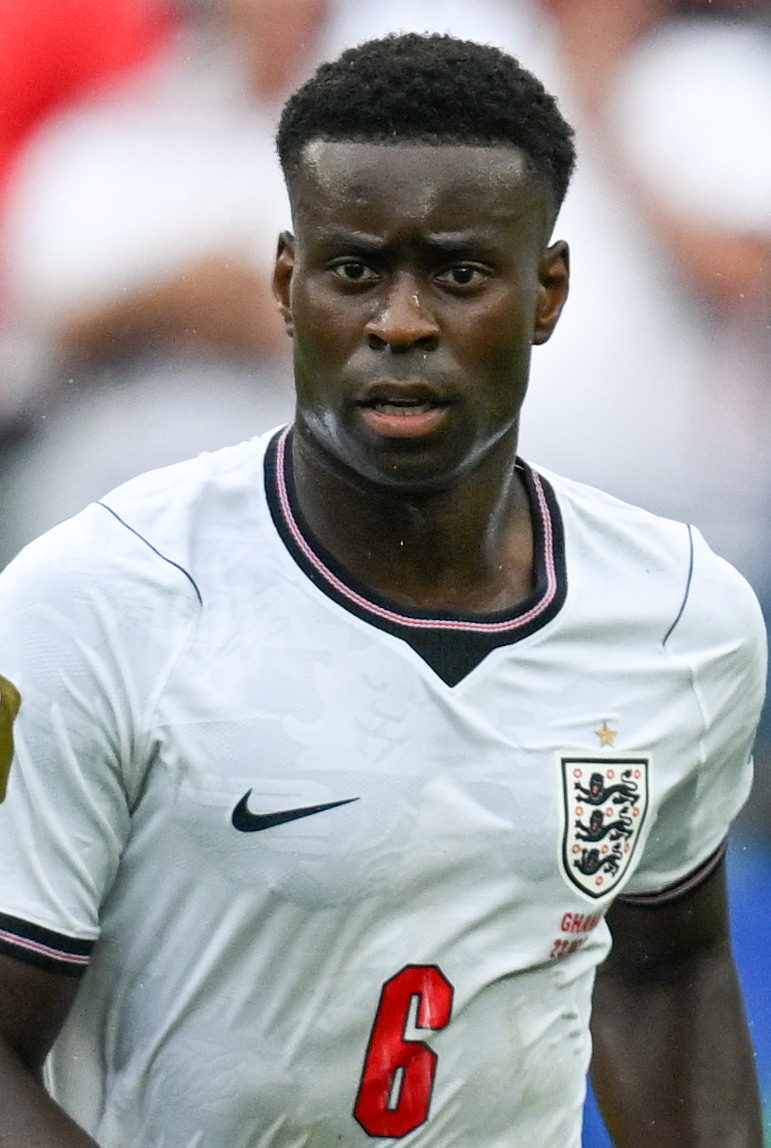
Guéhi playing for England at the 2026 FIFA World Cup

Guéhi received his first call-up to the England senior team in March 2022 as part of Gareth Southgate's squad for friendly matches against Switzerland and Ivory Coast. He made his senior debut in a 2–1 win over Switzerland at Wembley Stadium on 26 March.

On 6 June 2024, Guéhi was named in England's 26-man squad for UEFA Euro 2024. He played every minute as England topped Group C, partnering John Stones in central defence and keeping clean sheets against Serbia and Slovenia. He was praised by Southgate and numerous pundits for his performances at the tournament, with Micah Richards deeming him "calm and composed" and "a joy to watch", and Joe Hart describing him as "exceptional" and England's "standout performer". In the round of 16 match against Slovakia on 30 June, with England 1–0 down in the fifth minute of stoppage time, Guéhi flicked on a header from Kyle Walker's throw-in and assisted Jude Bellingham's last-second equalising goal. Having previously received his second yellow card of the tournament for a foul on David Strelec following a misplaced pass from Kieran Trippier, he was suspended for the following match, the quarter-final against Switzerland. Returning to the starting line-up for England's 2–1 semi-final victory over the Netherlands on 10 July, he started in the final against Spain on 14 July, with his last-minute header cleared off the line by Dani Olmo as England were defeated 2–1.

On 9 September 2025, Guéhi scored his first England goal in a 5–0 win over Serbia in qualifying for the 2026 World Cup. He captained England for the first time in a 1–0 friendly loss to Japan on 31 March 2026.

On 22 May 2026, Guéhi was selected in the 26-man squad for the 2026 FIFA World Cup. On 17 June, Guéhi made his World Cup debut, appearing as a substitute for John Stones in England's opening match against Croatia. He went on to replace Stones in the starting line-up, partnering Ezri Konsa against Ghana and Panama in the second and third group fixtures, keeping back-to-back clean sheets. He retained his place in central defence for the knockout stage as England beat DR Congo, Mexico and Norway to reach the semi-finals.

== Style of play ==
Guéhi has been described as very strong, and well positioned, although not particularly tall for a central defender. He has been credited for his coolness and maturity, and the strength of his concentration on the next game.

== Personal life ==
Guéhi has been described as being defined by his Christian faith. He is the son of a church minister, and has spoken about how "God first" was the rule in his household. Some of those close to him have described him as "extremely humble" and "low maintenance". As of August 2025, he still lived at home with his parents and three younger sisters.

In December 2024, the Football Association indicated that they would contact Guéhi to remind him religious messaging is banned from equipment, after he played with "I love Jesus" handwritten over the rainbow-coloured captain's armband as part of Stonewall's Rainbow Laces campaign to support LGBTQ+ issues. In spite of the warning, Guéhi further risked FA charges by writing "Jesus loves you" over his rainbow armband in Palace's following game. Guéhi's father defended him from criticism, accusing the LGBT community of "trying to impose on others what they believe in".

== Career statistics ==
=== Club ===
As of match played 20 September 2026

Appearances and goals by club, season and competition
Club	Season	League			FA Cup		EFL Cup		Europe		Other		Total	
Club	Season	Division	Apps	Goals	Apps	Goals	Apps	Goals	Apps	Goals	Apps	Goals	Apps	Goals
Chelsea U23	2018–19	—			—		—		—		5 (Note: Appearances in EFL Trophy)	0	5	0
Chelsea U23	2019–20	—			—		—		—		2	0	2	0
Chelsea U23	Total		—		—		—		—		7	0	7	0
Chelsea	2019–20	Premier League	0	0	0	0	2	0	0	0	0	0	2	0
Swansea City (loan)	2019–20	Championship	12	0	—		—		—		2 (Note: Appearances in Championship play-offs)	0	14	0
Swansea City (loan)	2020–21	Championship	40	0	2	0	0	0	—		3	0	45	0
Swansea City (loan)	Total		52	0	2	0	0	0	—		5	0	59	0
Crystal Palace	2021–22	Premier League	36	2	5	2	1	0	—		—		42	4
Crystal Palace	2022–23	Premier League	37	1	1	0	2	0	—		—		40	1
Crystal Palace	2023–24	Premier League	25	0	2	0	2	0	—		—		29	0
Crystal Palace	2024–25	Premier League	34	3	6	0	4	0	—		—		44	3
Crystal Palace	2025–26	Premier League	20	2	1	0	3	1	8 (Note: Appearances in UEFA Conference League)	0	1 (Note: Appearance in FA Community Shield)	0	33	3
Crystal Palace	Total		152	8	15	2	12	1	8	0	1	0	188	11
Manchester City	2025–26	Premier League	15	1	3	1	—		2 (Note: Appearances in UEFA Champions League)	0	—		20	2
Manchester City	2026–27	Premier League	5	1	0	0	0	0	1	0	1	0	7	1
Manchester City	Total		20	2	3	1	0	0	3	0	1	0	27	3
Career total			224	10	20	3	14	1	11	0	14	0	283	14

=== International ===
As of match played 6 October 2026

Appearances and goals by national team and year
National team	Year	Apps	Goals
England	2022	3	0
England	2023	6	0
England	2024	13	0
England	2025	4	1
England	2026	15	0
Total		41	1

As of match played 18 July 2026
England score listed first, score column indicates score after each Guéhi goal

List of international goals scored by Marc Guéhi
No.	Date	Venue	Cap	Opponent	Score	Result	Competition	Ref.
1	9 September 2025	Red Star Stadium, Belgrade, Serbia	25	Serbia	4–0	5–0	2026 FIFA World Cup qualification	

== Honours ==
Crystal Palace

- FA Cup: 2024–25
- FA Community Shield: 2025

Manchester City

- FA Cup: 2025–26

England U17

- FIFA U-17 World Cup: 2017
- UEFA European Under-17 Championship runner-up: 2017

England

- UEFA European Championship runner-up: 2024
- FIFA World Cup third place: 2026

Individual

- UEFA European Under-17 Championship Team of the Tournament: 2017
