= Fred Kurz =

English footballer

Personal information
- Date of birth: 3 September 1918
- Place of birth: Grimsby, England
- Date of death: 28 November 1978 (aged 60)
- Height: 5 ft 9 in (1.75 m)
- Position: Forward

Youth career
- ?–1938: Grimsby YMCA

Senior career*
Years	Team	Apps	(Gls)
1938–1939	Grimsby Town	3	(0)
1946–1951	Crystal Palace	148	(48)
1951–?	Boston United	?	(?)
- * Club domestic league appearances and goals

Frederick J. Kurz (3 September 1918 – 28 November 1978) was an English professional footballer who played as a forward. He made 148 appearances in the English Football League for Crystal Palace and also played for Grimsby Town. He concluded his career in non-league football with Boston United.

== Playing career ==
Kurz began his youth career in local football with Grimsby YMCA. In 1938, he signed for Grimsby Town but made only three senior appearances before his career was interrupted by World War II. He made wartime football appearances for Crystal Palace before signing for the club on a regular basis on 26 December 1945. When League football resumed in 1946–47, Palace played in the Third Division South. Kurz made 36 appearances that season, scoring five times. Over the subsequent four seasons he made 33 (18 goals), 37 (12 goals), 25 (10 goals), and 17 (3 goals) appearances respectively.

In August 1951, Kurz moved on to Boston United.

== Personal life ==
Fred Kurz died on 28 November 1978, aged 60.
