= Joachim Andersen (footballer) =

Danish footballer (born 1996)

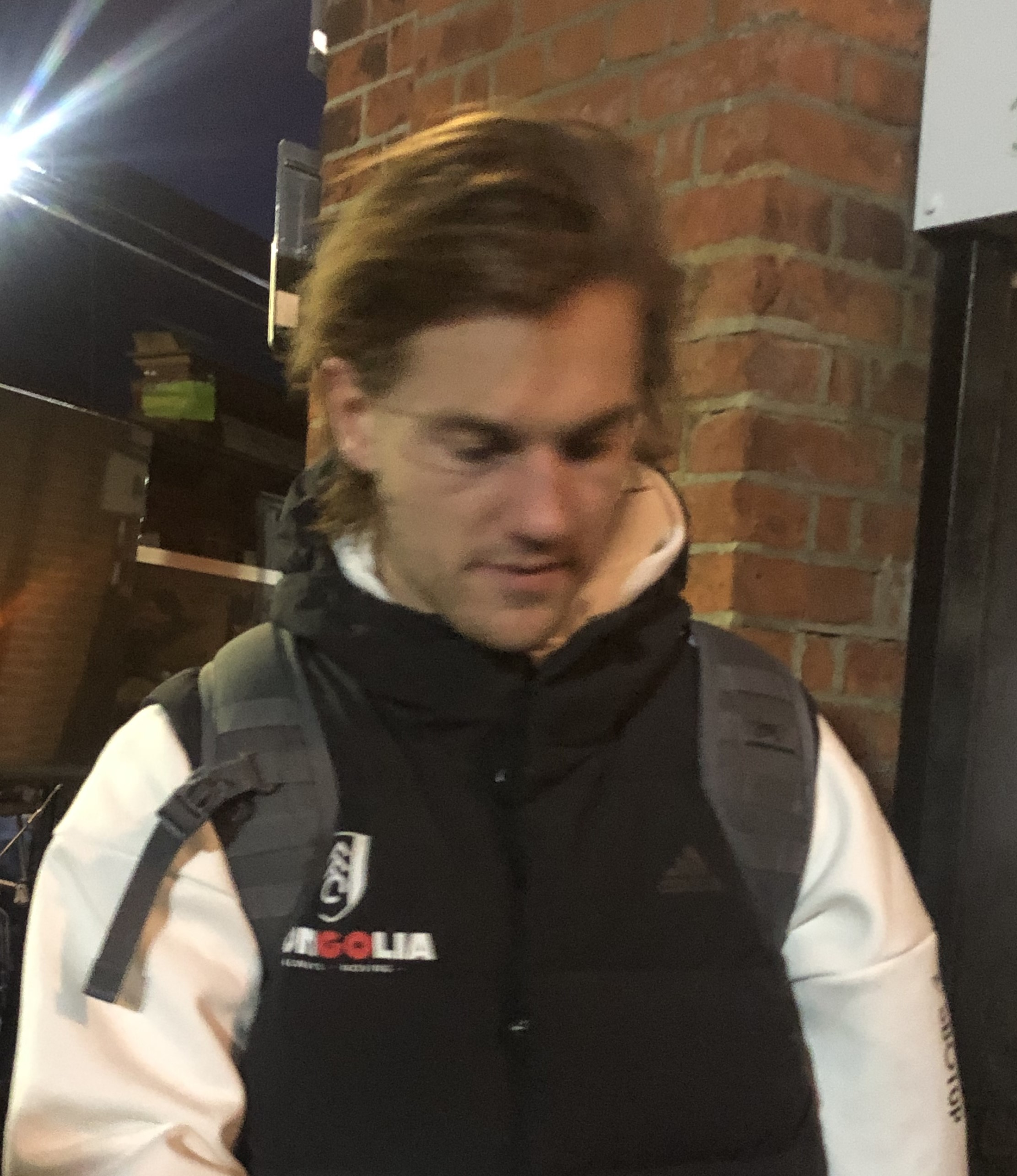
- Andersen in 2024

Personal information
- Full name: Joachim Christian Andersen
- Date of birth: 31 May 1996 (age 30)
- Place of birth: Solrød Strand, Denmark
- Height: 1.92 m (6 ft 4 in)
- Position: Centre-back

Team information
- Current team: Fulham
- Number: 5

Youth career
- 2000–2009: Greve Fodbold
- 2009–2011: Copenhagen
- 2011–2013: Midtjylland
- 2013–2014: Twente

Senior career*
Years	Team	Apps	(Gls)
2013–2017	Jong Twente	40	(0)
2013–2017	Twente	49	(4)
2017–2019	Sampdoria	39	(0)
2019–2021	Lyon	21	(1)
2020–2021	→ Fulham (loan)	31	(1)
2021–2024	Crystal Palace	104	(3)
2024–	Fulham	65	(0)

International career^{‡}
2012	Denmark U16	1	(0)
2013	Denmark U17	2	(0)
2014–2015	Denmark U19	13	(0)
2017	Denmark U20	2	(0)
2015–2018	Denmark U21	14	(0)
2019–	Denmark	57	(3)
- * Club domestic league appearances and goals as of 16:02, 20 September 2026 (UTC) ‡ National team caps and goals as of 21:57, 17 November 2026 (UTC)

Joachim Christian Andersen (Danish pronunciation: [ˈɑnɐsn̩]; born 31 May 1996) is a Danish professional footballer who plays as a centre-back for Premier League club Fulham and the Denmark national team.

After academy stints with numerous Danish clubs, Andersen began his senior career at Dutch club Twente. After a spell in Italy with Sampdoria, he was signed by French club Lyon in 2019. After a loan spell at Fulham, he remained in London to sign permanently with Crystal Palace in 2021, where he made 112 appearances over three years before returning to Fulham, this time on a permanent deal.

A Danish youth international, Andersen made his debut for the senior team in 2019, and went on to represent his nation at UEFA Euro 2020, the 2022 FIFA World Cup, and Euro 2024.

== Club career ==
=== Youth ===
Andersen started playing football at the age of four for local club Greve Fodbold, where he played from 2000 until 2009. He then joined Copenhagen's academy, School of Excellence, before leaving for Midtjylland when he was 15. At Midtjylland he moved into the talent academy in Ikast where players like Simon Kjær, Winston Reid, Erik Sviatchenko, Viktor Fischer and Pione Sisto had stayed before him.

In April 2013, before he had made his first team debut with Midtjylland, Twente sent out scouts to observe Andersen, and offered him a one-week trial, which he accepted. Four months later, he signed a youth contract with FC Twente for a fee rumoured to be around 5 million Danish kroner (€650,000). The plan was to start in the youth team to acclimatise, and progress to the senior sides after about 6 months.

=== Twente ===
Though he was still an under-19 player he was promoted to the senior team and on 8 November 2013, Andersen made his first appearance for Jong Twente playing the whole match. He did not play any matches for the first team in his first season, but already in his second year at the club he was promoted to train with the first team squad with players like Dušan Tadić, Hakim Ziyech, Jesús Manuel Corona, Quincy Promes, Andreas Bjelland, Kasper Kusk and Kamohelo Mokotjo.

On 7 March 2015, he got his chance in the first team debuting against Willem II, and playing the last 20 minutes. A week later, he signed a new contract with Twente until 2018. In 2015, Andersen won the prize for U19 talent of the year by the Danish Football Association.

On 22 March, he was named in the starting eleven against Groningen and scored his first goal for the first team. He slowly got more and more time on the pitch for the first team. He continued his development and became almost a regular part of the first team squad in the 2015–16 season.

=== Sampdoria ===
On 26 August 2017, Andersen signed a contract with Serie A club Sampdoria. He had offers from other clubs in different leagues but chose Sampdoria to develop in Serie A.

Andersen made his debut on 25 February 2018, in a match against Udinese. He played seven more matches that season and from the beginning of the 2018–19 season he became a regular starter attracting attention from bigger clubs. In his second season he only missed one game due to a ban. Sampdoria offered him a new contract until summer 2022 which he signed on 8 November 2018.

=== Lyon ===
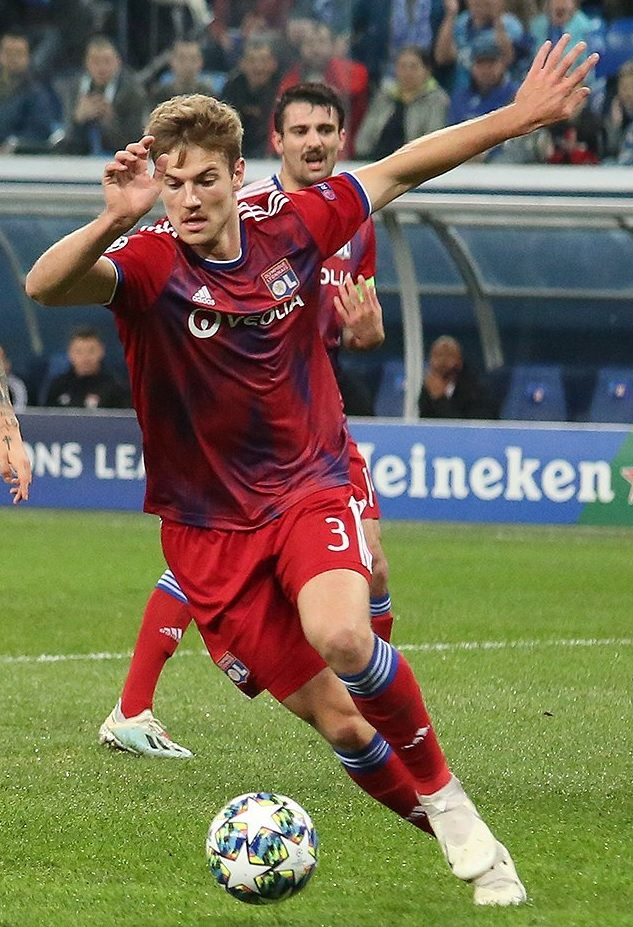
Andersen playing for Lyon in 2019

On 12 July 2019, Andersen signed a five-year contract with French side Olympique Lyonnais. The transfer fee amounted to €30 million (24 + 6 million in bonuses), meaning Andersen became Lyon's record transfer. It was also a record high transfer fee for a Danish football player.

On 2 October, he made his debut in the Champions League against RB Leipzig, and on 11 November he scored his first Champions League goal in the 3–1 win against Benfica.

==== Loan to Fulham ====
On 5 October 2020, Andersen joined Premier League club Fulham on a season-long loan. On 19 December, Andersen was sent off in a 1–1 draw with Newcastle United, receiving a second yellow when he gave away a controversial penalty for a foul on Callum Wilson which was dispatched by the latter. Andersen was nominated for the league's Player of the Month award for February 2021 after a number of impressive defensive displays that saw Fulham concede just three goals in six matches as they picked up a vital nine points in their fight against relegation. On 19 March, Andersen scored his first Fulham goal in a 1–2 home league defeat to Leeds United.

=== Crystal Palace ===
On 28 July 2021, Crystal Palace announced the signing of Andersen on a five-year deal for a fee of €17.5 million with €2.5 million add-on bonuses and a 12.5% sell on fee. In his first season, he made 39 appearances, forming a centre-back partnership with Marc Guéhi and starting in Palace's run to the FA Cup semi-final.

In the following season, Andersen was headbutted by Darwin Núñez, for which the Uruguayan was sent off on his home debut for Liverpool, a 1–1 draw with Palace on 15 August 2022. On 27 August, Andersen scored his first goal for the club to put Palace 2–0 up away at champions Manchester City, though City ultimately won 4–2.

Andersen's second goal for Palace was a late equaliser at Brentford on 26 August 2023, almost a year after his previous goal. He later scored the only goal, described as a "superb strike", in a victory over Manchester United at Old Trafford on 30 September. He finished the 2023–24 season as the player with most clearances in the Premier League in 229 occasions.

=== Return to Fulham ===
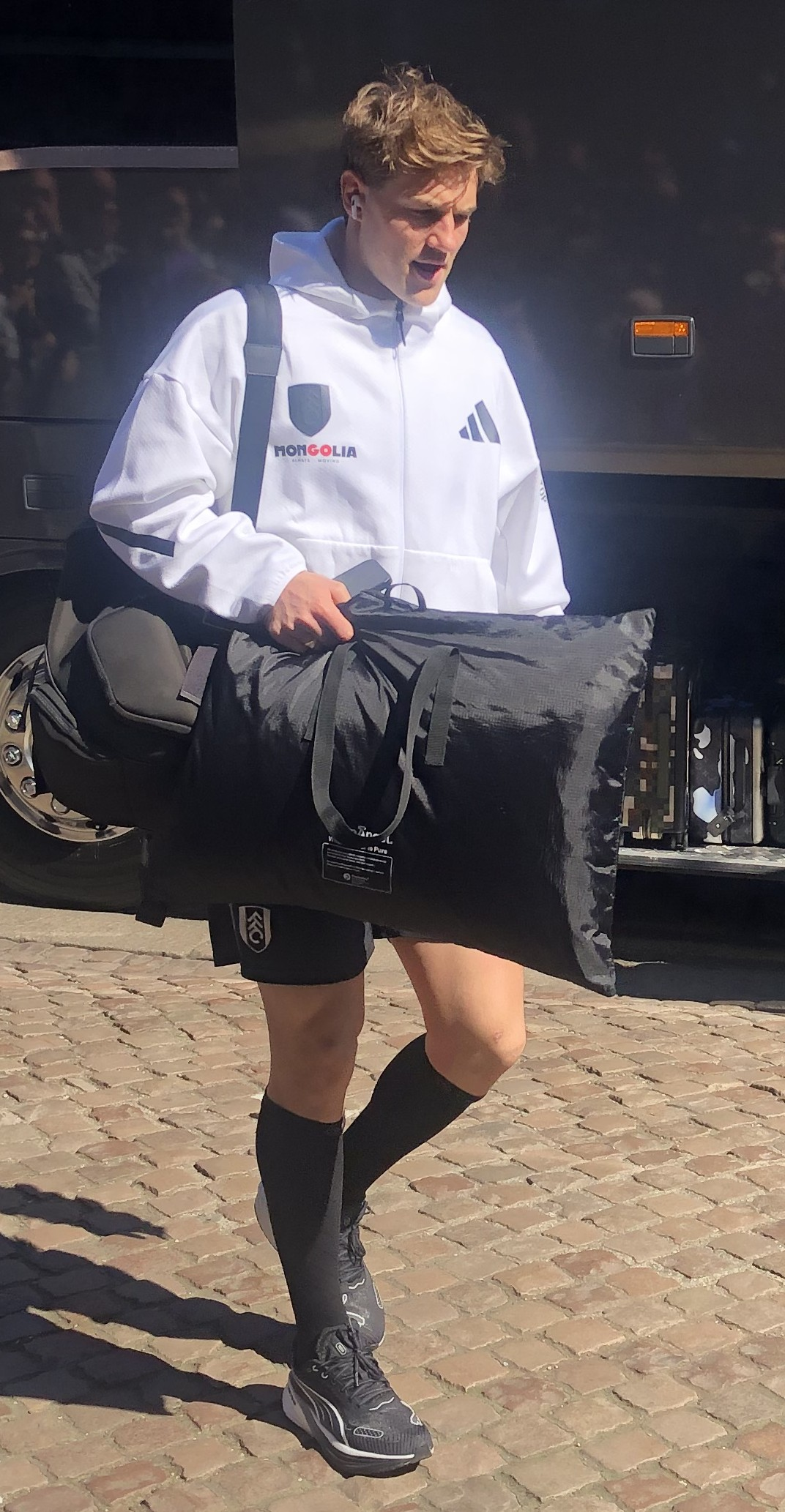
Andersen in 2025.

On 23 August 2024, Andersen returned to Fulham, this time on a permanent basis, signing a five-year deal with the club for a reported fee of £30 million.

== International career ==
He represented Denmark at U16, U17, U19, U20, and U21 levels before he was called up to the senior team for matches against Kosovo and Switzerland in March 2019. On 15 October 2019, he earned his first national team cap when Denmark beat Luxembourg 4–0.

On 25 May 2021, Andersen was included in the squad for UEFA Euro 2020. On 7 November 2022, he was named in the squad for the FIFA World Cup 2022.

On 30 May 2024, he was selected in the 26-man squad for the UEFA Euro 2024. In the round of 16 match against Germany, he had a goal disallowed for offside and later conceded a penalty for handling a cross, as the game concluded with a 2–0 defeat.

During 2026 FIFA World Cup qualification, Andersen scored his first goal for the national team in a 3–1 victory over Greece on 12 October 2025.

== Style of play ==
Andersen is considered a ball-playing defender with the ability to play on both right and left side of the central defence and even in defensive midfield. In the 2018–19 season, Inter Milan midfielder Marcelo Brozović was the only player in Serie A with more accurate long-passes than Andersen.

== Career statistics ==
=== Club ===
As of match played 28 October 2026

Appearances and goals by club, season and competition
Club	Season	League			National cup (Note: Includes KNVB Cup, Coppa Italia, Coupe de France, FA Cup)		League cup (Note: Includes Coupe de la Ligue, EFL Cup)		Europe		Total	
Club	Season	Division	Apps	Goals	Apps	Goals	Apps	Goals	Apps	Goals	Apps	Goals
Twente	2014–15	Eredivisie	7	1	1	0	—		—		8	1
Twente	2015–16	Eredivisie	18	1	0	0	—		—		18	1
Twente	2016–17	Eredivisie	22	2	0	0	—		—		22	2
Twente	2017–18	Eredivisie	2	0	0	0	—		—		2	0
Twente	Total		49	4	1	0	—		—		50	4
Sampdoria	2017–18	Serie A	7	0	1	0	—		—		8	0
Sampdoria	2018–19	Serie A	32	0	2	0	—		—		34	0
Sampdoria	Total		39	0	3	0	—		—		42	0
Lyon	2019–20	Ligue 1	18	1	4	0	4	0	6 (Note: Appearances in UEFA Champions League)	1	32	2
Lyon	2020–21	Ligue 1	3	0	0	0	—		0	0	3	0
Lyon	Total		21	1	4	0	4	0	6	1	35	2
Fulham (loan)	2020–21	Premier League	31	1	0	0	—		—		31	1
Crystal Palace	2021–22	Premier League	34	0	4	0	1	0	—		39	0
Crystal Palace	2022–23	Premier League	32	1	1	0	0	0	—		33	1
Crystal Palace	2023–24	Premier League	37	2	2	0	0	0	—		39	2
Crystal Palace	2024–25	Premier League	1	0	—		—		—		1	0
Crystal Palace	Total		104	3	7	0	1	0	—		112	3
Fulham	2024–25	Premier League	29	0	3	1	1	0	—		33	1
Fulham	2025–26	Premier League	33	0	1	0	1	0	—		35	0
Fulham	2026–27	Premier League	3	0	0	0	2	0	—		5	0
Fulham	Total		65	0	4	1	4	0	—		73	1
Career total			309	9	19	1	9	0	6	1	343	11

=== International ===
As of match played 17 November 2026

Appearances and goals by national team and year
National team	Year	Apps	Goals
Denmark	2019	1	0
Denmark	2020	0	0
Denmark	2021	10	0
Denmark	2022	11	0
Denmark	2023	7	0
Denmark	2024	10	0
Denmark	2025	9	1
Denmark	2026	9	2
Total		57	3

Denmark score listed first, score column indicates score after each Andersen goal.

List of international goals scored by Joachim Andersen
No.	Date	Venue	Cap	Opponent	Score	Result	Competition
1	12 October 2025	Parken Stadium, Copenhagen, Denmark	47	Greece	2–0	3–1	2026 FIFA World Cup qualification
2	31 March 2026	Stadion Letná, Prague, Czech Republic	49	Czech Republic	1–1	2–2 (a.e.t.) (1–3 p)	2026 FIFA World Cup qualification
3	14 November 2026	Estádio Municipal de Braga, Braga, Portugal	56	Portugal	4–0	4–1	2026–27 UEFA Nations League A
