= Percy Cherrett =

English footballer (1899–1984)

Personal information
- Full name: Percy Albert Mark Cherrett
- Date of birth: 12 September 1899
- Place of birth: Christchurch, England
- Date of death: 1984 (aged 84–85)
- Place of death: Bournemouth, England
- Position: Centre forward

Senior career*
Years	Team	Apps	(Gls)
1920–1923	Portsmouth	67	(36)
1923–1925	Plymouth Argyle	61	(36)
1925–1927	Crystal Palace	75	(58)
1927–1928	Bristol City	25	(15)
1928–1929	Bournemouth & Boscombe	36	(19)
- Cowes
Total		264	(164)
- * Club domestic league appearances and goals

Percy Albert Mark Cherrett (12 September 1899 – 1984) was an English footballer who played as a centre forward in the Football League for Portsmouth, Plymouth Argyle, Crystal Palace, Bristol City and Bournemouth & Boscombe.

== Life and career ==
Cherrett was born in Christchurch. A centre forward who could also play as an inside forward, Cherrett turned professional with Portsmouth in 1920, having started his career with Boscombe. He scored 36 goals in 67 league appearances before losing his place in the team after three seasons. He was transferred to Plymouth Argyle in the summer of 1923 and continued to score goals regularly. Cherrett was the club's top goalscorer in his first season with Argyle, scoring 27 goals in 41 matches, and he scored nine more in 21 games the following season. The arrival of Jack Cock in 1925 saw Cherrett lose his place in the side and he was sold to Crystal Palace later that year.

He finished as the club's top goalscorer in the two seasons that he played for Palace, scoring 33 and 32 goals in all competitions, and he also scored two hat-tricks. Cherrett joined Bristol City in 1927, where he scored 15 league goals in 25 appearances, and then moved to Bournemouth & Boscombe in 1928. Cherrett scored 19 more league goals in 36 matches to bring his tally in the Football League to 164 goals scored in 264 appearances. He finished his career in non-league football, playing for Cowes on the Isle of Wight.
