= John Conner (footballer) =

Scottish footballer

John "Jack" Conner
Personal information
- Full name: John Conner
- Date of birth: 27 December 1896
- Place of birth: Glasgow, Scotland
- Position: Forward

Senior career*
Years	Team	Apps	(Gls)
- Belfast Distillery
1919–1923	Crystal Palace	98	(55)
- Newport County

International career
1911	England	1	(0)
- * Club domestic league appearances and goals

John Conner (27 December 1896 – ?) was a Scottish footballer, who played as a forward.

== Career ==
Born in Glasgow, Conner played professionally for Crystal Palace. He made 37 appearances for the club in the Southern League, scoring 18 goals, and when the club joined the Football League he made a further 61 appearances scoring 37 goals. He played across the front line, sometimes used as an inside right or inside left. He also appeared 6 times for the club in the FA Cup, netting on two occasions, for a total of 104 appearances and 57 goals. Conner's goals in the 1920-21 season lifted the club from the Third Division to the Second, and he finished top-scorer with 29 goals and was one of only four players to play every game of the season. Conner also scored the winning goal in the London Challenge Cup Final of that season, Palace beating Clapton Orient 1-0. At the end of the 1922-23 season Conner left the club for Newport County.

== Sources ==
- King, Ian (2012). Crystal Palace: The Complete Record 1905-2011. Derby Books Publishing Company Limited. pp. 258–9, 484 & 534–5. ISBN 978-1-78091-221-9.
