= George Clarke (footballer, born 1900) =

English footballer

Personal information
- Date of birth: 24 July 1900
- Place of birth: Bolsover, England
- Date of death: 11 February 1977 (aged 76)
- Height: 5 ft 9 in (1.75 m)
- Position: Outside left

Youth career
- ?–1922: Mansfield Town

Senior career*
Years	Team	Apps	(Gls)
1922–1925	Aston Villa	1	(?)
1925–1933	Crystal Palace	274	(98)
1933–1934	Queens Park Rangers	16	(6)
1934–?	Folkestone	?	(?)
- * Club domestic league appearances and goals

George B. Clarke (24 July 1900 – 11 February 1977) was an English professional footballer, who played as an outside left in the Football League for Aston Villa, Crystal Palace and Queens Park Rangers. He also played non-league football for Mansfield Town and Folkestone.

== Playing career ==
Clarke began his playing career with Mansfield Town, at that time a non-league team, having previously worked as a miner at Welbeck Colliery. In 1922, Aston Villa paid £500 to sign him but his sole Villa appearance was not made until February 1925, and in May 1925, he was signed by former Aston Villa reserve player and then Crystal Palace manager, Edmund Goodman. In his first season with Crystal Palace, Clarke missed only one game and remained a fixture in the side for the next seven seasons. His 98 goals, as a winger, for Palace has only been exceeded by central strikers, but his main contribution was as a creator of scoring chances; supplying opportunities for the main strikers, particularly Peter Simpson.

In the 1933 close season, Clarke moved to Queens Park Rangers but remained there for only one season, before moving into non-league football with Folkestone.

George Clarke died on 11 February 1977 aged 76.
