= 1930–31 in English football =

Football in England
- Season: 1930–31

Men's football
- Football League: Arsenal
- Football League Second Division: Everton
- FA Cup: West Bromwich Albion

The 1930–31 season was the 56th season of competitive football in England.

== Overview ==
Aston Villa scored 128 league goals, a First Division record, and the number of goals scored per match, at just under four, was the highest in any season since 1900.

Manchester United lost fourteen consecutive matches, including twelve at the start of this season, to create a long-time record for most consecutive losses in top-flight English football. The record was beaten by Sunderland who lost the last fifteen matches of the 2002–03 Premier League season.

Chesterfield scored in 47 consecutive games between December 1929 and December 1930 in the Third Division North, setting the record for the most number of consecutive games in which a club has scored in League football; a record that would not be broken until 2003, when Arsenal scored in 55 consecutive games in the Premier League between May 2001 and December 2003.

== Honours ==
Competition	Winner	Runner-up
First Division	Arsenal (1)	Aston Villa
Second Division	Everton	West Bromwich Albion
Third Division North	Chesterfield	Lincoln City
Third Division South	Notts County	Crystal Palace
FA Cup	West Bromwich Albion (3)	Birmingham
Charity Shield	Arsenal	Sheffield Wednesday
Home Championship	Shared by England and Scotland	

Notes = Number in parentheses is the times that club has won that honour. * indicates new record for competition

== Football League ==
=== First Division ===
Pos	Team	Pld	W	D	L	GF	GA	GAv	Pts	Relegation
1	Arsenal (C)	42	28	10	4	127	59	2.153	66	
2	Aston Villa	42	25	9	8	128	78	1.641	59	
3	Sheffield Wednesday	42	22	8	12	102	75	1.360	52	
4	Portsmouth	42	18	13	11	84	67	1.254	49	
5	Huddersfield Town	42	18	12	12	81	65	1.246	48	
6	Derby County	42	18	10	14	94	79	1.190	46	
7	Middlesbrough	42	19	8	15	98	90	1.089	46	
8	Manchester City	42	18	10	14	75	70	1.071	46	
9	Liverpool	42	15	12	15	86	85	1.012	42	
10	Blackburn Rovers	42	17	8	17	83	84	0.988	42	
11	Sunderland	42	16	9	17	89	85	1.047	41	
12	Chelsea	42	15	10	17	64	67	0.955	40	
13	Grimsby Town	42	17	5	20	82	87	0.943	39	
14	Bolton Wanderers	42	15	9	18	68	81	0.840	39	
15	Sheffield United	42	14	10	18	78	84	0.929	38	
16	Leicester City	42	16	6	20	80	95	0.842	38	
17	Newcastle United	42	15	6	21	78	87	0.897	36	
18	West Ham United	42	14	8	20	79	94	0.840	36	
19	Birmingham	42	13	10	19	55	70	0.786	36	
20	Blackpool	42	11	10	21	71	125	0.568	32	
21	Leeds United (R)	42	12	7	23	68	81	0.840	31	Relegation to the Second Division
22	Manchester United (R)	42	7	8	27	53	115	0.461	22	Relegation to the Second Division

Source: World Football
Rules for classification: 1) Points; 2) Goal average; 3) Goals scored
(C) Champions; (R) Relegated

=== Second Division ===
Pos	Team	Pld	W	D	L	GF	GA	GAv	Pts	Relegation
1	Everton (C, P)	42	28	5	9	121	66	1.833	61	Promotion to the First Division
2	West Bromwich Albion (P)	42	22	10	10	83	49	1.694	54	Promotion to the First Division
3	Tottenham Hotspur	42	22	7	13	88	55	1.600	51	
4	Wolverhampton Wanderers	42	21	5	16	84	67	1.254	47	
5	Port Vale	42	21	5	16	67	61	1.098	47	
6	Bradford (Park Avenue)	42	18	10	14	97	66	1.470	46	
7	Preston North End	42	17	11	14	83	64	1.297	45	
8	Burnley	42	17	11	14	81	77	1.052	45	
9	Southampton	42	19	6	17	74	62	1.194	44	
10	Bradford City	42	17	10	15	61	63	0.968	44	
11	Stoke City	42	17	10	15	64	71	0.901	44	
12	Oldham Athletic	42	16	10	16	61	72	0.847	42	
13	Bury	42	19	3	20	75	82	0.915	41	
14	Millwall	42	16	7	19	71	80	0.888	39	
15	Charlton Athletic	42	15	9	18	59	86	0.686	39	
16	Bristol City	42	15	8	19	54	82	0.659	38	
17	Nottingham Forest	42	14	9	19	80	85	0.941	37	
18	Plymouth Argyle	42	14	8	20	76	84	0.905	36	
19	Barnsley	42	13	9	20	59	79	0.747	35	
20	Swansea Town	42	12	10	20	51	74	0.689	34	
21	Reading (R)	42	12	6	24	72	96	0.750	30	Relegation to the Third Division South
22	Cardiff City (R)	42	8	9	25	47	87	0.540	25	Relegation to the Third Division South

Rules for classification: 1) Points; 2) Goal average; 3) Goals scored
(C) Champions; (P) Promoted; (R) Relegated

=== Third Division North ===
Pos	Team	Pld	W	D	L	GF	GA	GAv	Pts	Promotion or relegation
1	Chesterfield (C, P)	42	26	6	10	102	57	1.789	58	Promotion to the Second Division
2	Lincoln City	42	25	7	10	102	59	1.729	57	
3	Wrexham	42	21	12	9	94	62	1.516	54	
4	Tranmere Rovers	42	24	6	12	111	74	1.500	54	
5	Southport	42	22	9	11	88	56	1.571	53	
6	Hull City	42	20	10	12	99	55	1.800	50	
7	Stockport County	42	20	9	13	77	61	1.262	49	
8	Carlisle United	42	20	5	17	98	81	1.210	45	
9	Gateshead	42	16	13	13	71	73	0.973	45	
10	Wigan Borough	42	19	5	18	76	86	0.884	43	
11	Darlington	42	16	10	16	71	59	1.203	42	
12	York City	42	18	6	18	85	82	1.037	42	
13	Accrington Stanley	42	15	9	18	84	108	0.778	39	
14	Rotherham United	42	13	12	17	81	83	0.976	38	
15	Doncaster Rovers	42	13	11	18	65	65	1.000	37	
16	Barrow	42	15	7	20	68	89	0.764	37	
17	Halifax Town	42	13	9	20	55	89	0.618	35	
18	Crewe Alexandra	42	14	6	22	66	93	0.710	34	
19	New Brighton	42	13	7	22	49	76	0.645	33	
20	Hartlepools United	42	12	6	24	67	86	0.779	30	
21	Rochdale	42	12	6	24	62	107	0.579	30	Re-elected
22	Nelson (R)	42	6	7	29	43	113	0.381	19	Failed re-election and demoted

Source: rsssf.com
(C) Division Champions; (P) Promoted; (R) Relegated

=== Third Division South ===
Pos	Team	Pld	W	D	L	GF	GA	GAv	Pts	Promotion or relegation
1	Notts County (C, P)	42	24	11	7	97	46	2.109	59	Promotion to the Second Division
2	Crystal Palace	42	22	7	13	107	71	1.507	51	
3	Brentford	42	22	6	14	90	64	1.406	50	
4	Brighton & Hove Albion	42	17	15	10	68	53	1.283	49	
5	Southend United	42	22	5	15	76	60	1.267	49	
6	Northampton Town	42	18	12	12	77	59	1.305	48	
7	Luton Town	42	19	8	15	76	51	1.490	46	
8	Queens Park Rangers	42	20	3	19	82	75	1.093	43	
9	Fulham	42	18	7	17	77	75	1.027	43	
10	Bournemouth & Boscombe Athletic	42	15	13	14	72	73	0.986	43	
11	Torquay United	42	17	9	16	80	84	0.952	43	
12	Swindon Town	42	18	6	18	89	94	0.947	42	
13	Exeter City	42	17	8	17	84	90	0.933	42	
14	Coventry City	42	16	9	17	75	65	1.154	41	
15	Bristol Rovers	42	16	8	18	75	92	0.815	40	
16	Gillingham	42	14	10	18	61	76	0.803	38	
17	Walsall	42	14	9	19	78	95	0.821	37	Transferred to the Third Division North
18	Watford	42	14	7	21	72	75	0.960	35	
19	Clapton Orient	42	14	7	21	63	91	0.692	35	
20	Thames	42	13	8	21	54	93	0.581	34	
21	Newport County (R)	42	11	6	25	69	111	0.622	28	Failed re-election and demoted to the Southern League
22	Norwich City	42	10	8	24	47	76	0.618	28	Re-elected

(C) Division Champions; (P) Promoted; (R) Relegated

=== Top goalscorers ===
First Division

- Tom Waring (Aston Villa) – 49 goals

Second Division

- Dixie Dean (Everton) – 39 goals

Third Division North

- Jimmy McConnell (Carlisle United) – 37 goals

Third Division South

- Peter Simpson (Crystal Palace) – 46 goals
