= Edwin Smith (footballer) =

English footballer

Ted Smith
Personal information
- Full name: Edwin Smith
- Place of birth: Birmingham, England
- Height: 5 ft 9 in (1.75 m)
- Position: Striker

Senior career*
Years	Team	Apps	(Gls)
Unknown–1911	Hull City A.F.C.		
1911–1920	Crystal Palace F.C.	192	(124)
- * Club domestic league appearances and goals

Edwin 'Ted' Smith was an English footballer who most notably played for Crystal Palace as a striker.

Born in Birmingham, Smith first started his career at Hull and was then spotted by Crystal Palace and was signed in 1911. Smith was regarded as one of Palace's greatest strikers and is their second all-time top goalscorer, with 124 goals.
