= George Whitworth (footballer, born 1896) =

English footballer (1896–c.1928)

Personal information
- Date of birth: 14 July 1896
- Place of birth: Northampton, England
- Height: 5 ft 9 in (1.75 m)
- Position: Centre forward

Senior career*
| Years | Team | Apps | (Gls) |
| ?–1914 | Rushden Windmill | ? | (?) |
| 1914–1922 | Northampton Town | 67 | (42) |
| 1922–1925 | Crystal Palace | 111 | (48) |
| 1925 | Sheffield Wednesday | 0 | (0) |
| 1925–1928 | Hull City | 67 | (31) |
| 1928 | South Shields | 0 | (0) |
| | Peterborough & Fletton United | ? | (?) |
| Total | | 245 | (121) |
- * Club domestic league appearances and goals

George H. Whitworth (14 July 1896 – after 1928) was an English footballer who played for Northampton Town, Crystal Palace and Hull City in the Football League.

Whitworth began his playing career with Rushden Windmill, and joined Northampton Town in 1914, but his career was then interrupted by World War I. He played for Crystal Palace as a guest in wartime football competitions, but returned to Northampton thereafter. It was not until after Palace had joined the Football League as a founder member of the Third Division South for season 1920–21 and were subsequently promoted to the Second Division in 1921 that Whitworth joined the club on a full-time basis. He signed in May 1922, for what was quoted to be a "large fee" and played in eight games before the end of the season, scoring twice.

Over the next three seasons Whitworth made a further 105 appearances scoring 46 goals but in 1925 Palace were relegated and in May, he moved to Sheffield Wednesday. However, Whitworth could not break into the first team and in November 1925 moved on to Hull City, where he made 67 appearances in three seasons scoring 31 goals, before finishing his career with Peterborough & Fletton United, whom he joined in the 1928 close season.
