= Jack Little (footballer) =

English footballer

Personal information
- Full name: Joseph Little
- Date of birth: 25 January 1885
- Place of birth: Seaton Delaval, England
- Date of death: 1965 (aged 79–80)
- Height: 5 ft 8 in (1.73 m)
- Position: Full back

Senior career*
Years	Team	Apps	(Gls)
- Croydon Common
1919–1926	Crystal Palace	242	(0)
- Sittingbourne
- * Club domestic league appearances and goals

Joseph Little also known as Jack Little (25 January 1885 – 1965) was an English professional footballer, who played for Croydon Common, Crystal Palace and Sittingbourne.

== Career ==
Born in Northumberland, Little played professionally for Croydon Common until the outbreak of World War I in 1914. When Croydon Common were wound up in 1917, Little signed for nearby club and Southern Football League rivals Crystal Palace. Little stayed at Palace as the club went from the Southern League to the Third Division, winning the new Division at the first attempt. Little played in Palace's campaigns in the Second Division. Palace were relegated to the then Division Three South for the 1925–26 season, and this proved to be Little's last with the club. His last match was that season's away 1–1 draw with Gillingham on 3 April 1926, which saw him become the oldest player to appear in first team competitive football for the club at 41 years, 68 days. Little made 42 appearances for Palace in the Southern League, 200 in the Football League and 19 in the FA Cup. After Palace, Little moved on to Sittingbourne.
