= Peter Simpson (Scottish footballer) =

Scottish footballer (1904–1974)

Personal information
- Full name: Peter Simpson
- Date of birth: 13 November 1904
- Place of birth: Leith, Scotland
- Date of death: March 1974 (aged 69)
- Place of death: Croydon, Surrey
- Height: 5 ft 10 in (1.78 m)
- Position: Striker

Senior career*
Years	Team	Apps	(Gls)
?–1925	Leith Amateurs	20	(15)
1925–1927	St Bernard's	58	(78)
1927–1929	Kettering Town	60	(100)
1929–1935	Crystal Palace	195	(165)
1935–1937	West Ham United	?	(?)
1937–?	Reading	?	(?)
	Aldershot	?	(?)
- * Club domestic league appearances and goals

Peter Simpson (13 November 1904 – March 1974) was a Scottish footballer of the 1920s and 1930s who set many scoring records.

== Club career ==
=== Early career ===
Simpson was born in Leith and began his career with local side Leith Amateurs, before joining Division Two side St Bernard's for the start of the 1925–26 season. He scored 12 times in his first 7 games for "Saints" and eventually totalled 33 goals for the season. However, the 1926 General Strike had severe financial ramifications for Scottish lower-league sides, and part way into the 1926–27 season Simpson left St Bernard's for English non-league side Kettering Town.

At Kettering, Simpson did well and his break came, in a game for Kettering playing against Crystal Palace in an FA Cup First Round tie in 1928. Though he failed to find the net, Simpson impressed Palace manager Fred Mavin who signed him the following summer.

=== Crystal Palace ===
Simpson made his Crystal Palace debut in the fifth game of the 1929–30 season against Norwich City and scored a hat-trick, and by March of that season, had scored 27 goals in 27 league and cup games. This alerted the big clubs of the time to his talent, and a transfer away from Selhurst Park seemed certain. However, the Palace directors put a huge price-tag on his contract, and no move came. He finished the season, and improved on his record up until March, finally having netted 36 times in 34 games.

In the 1930–31 season, he achieved a Palace record, scoring six goals in a 7–2 win over Exeter City, in a Division Three South fixture. He would go on to score 46 goals that season, a Palace record that still stands.

In his first five Palace seasons, Simpson topped the goalscoring charts every time, another unbeaten record.

In the 1934–35 season, Simpson suffered a knee injury. After his comeback, Simpson appeared to be inferior to the player he was before. In April 1935, he scored in a 1–1 draw with Swindon Town which would prove to be his last outing for Palace. He was transferred to West Ham United that summer. His final Palace total was 165 goals, from 195 appearances, a goals-per-game total of 0.85. He also scored 19 hat-tricks for Palace, in four years. His goals and hat-trick totals for Palace are records that are still unbeaten.

=== West Ham United, Reading and Aldershot ===
After two largely un-noteworthy seasons with West Ham, and still not fully recovered from his injury, he left in 1937, moving to Reading. At Elm Park, despite being towards the end of his career, he seemed to regain some form. He would return to Selhurst Park in early 1938 with "The Royals", and score two of Reading's three goals, to beat "The Glaziers" 3–2. Simpson ended his career with a short spell at Aldershot.

== Biography ==
After his playing career ended, Simpson returned to the Croydon area, taking over a tobacconist's there. He died in Croydon, at the age of sixty-nine. However, though he did not make it into Palace's Centenary XI (possibly because the majority of the voters were more accustomed to the talents of later players, Ian Wright and Andrew Johnson, who played in the top division, rather than a vintage great, such as Simpson), the record books of Crystal Palace F.C., continue to show Simpson's achievements.
