= George Irwin =

George Irwin may refer to:

- George Irwin (football manager) (1891–?), manager of the English football clubs Crystal Palace, 1939–1947, and Darlington, 1950–1952
- George A. Irwin (1844–1913), Seventh-day Adventist administrator
- George Rankine Irwin (1907–1998), American scientist in the field of fracture mechanics and strength of materials
- George LeRoy Irwin (1868–1931), U.S. Army general
- George Macaulay Irwin (1921–2020), American arts expert

== See also ==
- George Irving (disambiguation)
- George Irvine (disambiguation)
