= Holmesdale Fanatics =

English football supporters' group

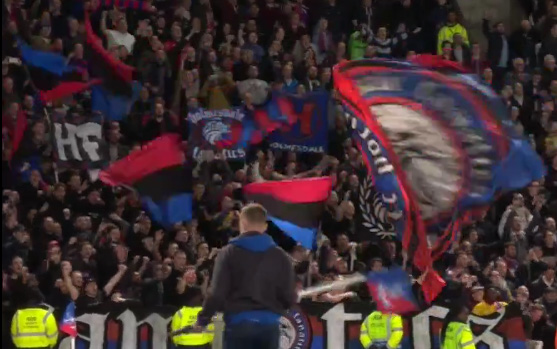
- Holmesdale Fanatics in 2017
- Nickname: Fanatics
- Abbreviation: HF05
- Established: 2005
- Type: Ultras group Supporters' group
- Team: Crystal Palace
- Location: Selhurst, London, England
- Stadium: Selhurst Park
- Stand: Holmesdale Road Stand
- Coordinates: 51°23′54″N 0°5′8″W
- Colours: Red Blue Black
- Website: Official website

The Holmesdale Fanatics were an ultras group associated with English Premier League club Crystal Palace F.C.. The group were responsible for vocal support as well as flag and tifo displays.

As a footballing nation, England does not traditionally have a strong ultra culture compared with much of the rest of Europe, although groups such as the Holmesdale Fanatics were often described as among England’s closest equivalents to a continental ultra group.

== History ==
The group was founded in December 2005 by a small group of supporters who had attended matches together since childhood in the 1980s and had stood in Block B of the Holmesdale Road Stand since 1999. They formed the group having experienced what they described as the "old school days of terracing" and wished to continue those traditions.

The group spent its early years opposing stadium regulations introduced following the Taylor report, which they described as restrictive. In the early part of 2010, Palace entered administration, during which time the Holmesdale Fanatics became increasingly prominent by organising protests that attracted national and international attention. The club was subsequently saved from administration in June that year.

In 2019, the group moved into Block E, although the move was preceded by a supporter strike following delays and concerns over communication from the club regarding the relocation.

Crystal Palace supporters, particularly those in the Holmesdale Road End, had become known for organised displays and coordinated support, with the Holmesdale Fanatics playing a prominent role. During Palace’s FA Cup-winning campaign in the 2024–25 season, the Fanatics gained wider attention for their large-scale tifos and vocal backing. The group organised fundraising efforts that raised more than £45,000, contributing to supporter displays at Wembley Stadium during the semi-final and final.

The Guardian wrote in December 2025 that the Holmesdale Fanatics have been involved in a long-running feud with a loosely organised pro-Tommy Robinson group of Crystal Palace supporters. Footage uploaded to X showed the two rival groups clashing in Strasbourg, with bottles and chairs being thrown, and a violent incident reportedly took place inside the stadium in which a lone member of the Holmesdale Fanatics was targeted.

In August 2026, new Palace manager Pierre Sage stated that a key reason he decided to take charge of the club is because it was one of the only clubs in the Premier League that had ultras. However, later that same month after 21 years, the group announced its disbandment, citing the commercialised state of modern football, high ticket prices preventing younger fans from attending matches, and increasing stadium restrictions as primary factors.
