= When Eagles Dare =

- Genre: Sports documentary
- Written by: Chris Grierson; Sean Webb; James Woodroof
- Directed by: Sean Webb
- Starring: Steve Parish; Wilfried Zaha; Ian Holloway; Stephen Browett; Kevin Day; Damien Delaney; Doc Brown; Chris Grierson; Scott Guyett; Mile Jedinak; Glenn Murray; Peter Ramage; Julián Speroni; Mark Steel; Joel Ward; Jonny Williams; Yannick Bolasie; Mark Bright; Dougie Freedman; Kevin Phillips
- Country of origin: United Kingdom
- Original language: English
- No. of episodes: 5

Production
- Executive producer: James Woodroof
- Producer: Chris Grierson
- Cinematography: Sean Webb
- Editor: Sean Webb
- Running time: 42–59 minutes
- Production company: Palace TV

Original release
- Network: Amazon Prime Video
- Release: 4 June 2021

When Eagles Dare is a British sports documentary television series on Amazon Prime Video. The series follows Crystal Palace Football Club during their 2012–13 league campaign, which concluded with the club gaining promotion to the Premier League after winning the Championship play-offs. The series features fly-on-the-wall footage recorded during that league season, which had never been released, as well as interviews with celebrity supporters, players and staff that were involved throughout the season.

The series, consisting of five episodes, was released on 4 June 2021.

== Cast ==
=== Staff ===
- Steve Parish
- Ian Holloway
- Stephen Browett
- Dougie Freedman
- Chris Grierson
- Scott Guyett

=== Players ===
- Wilfried Zaha
- Damien Delaney
- Mile Jedinak
- Glenn Murray
- Peter Ramage
- Julián Speroni
- Joel Ward
- Jonny Williams
- Yannick Bolasie
- Kevin Phillips

=== Supporters ===
- Kevin Day
- Doc Brown
- Mark Bright
- Mark Steel

== Episodes ==
| No. | Title | Directed by | Written by | Original release date |
|---|---|---|---|---|
| 1 | "Back from the Brink" | Sean Webb | Chris Grierson, Sean Webb & James Woodroof | 4 June 2021 |
With Crystal Palace deducted 10 points and on the brink of going out of business forever, four fans battle to strike a deal that will save the club they've supported since childhood.
| 2 | "Dougie's Team" | Sean Webb | Chris Grierson, Sean Webb & James Woodroof | 4 June 2021 |
Rookie manager Dougie Freedman adds to his band of misfits. The frontline finally clicks, Wilfried Zaha is on fire...what could possibly go wrong?
| 3 | "Ollie" | Sean Webb | Chris Grierson, Sean Webb & James Woodroof | 4 June 2021 |
Ian Holloway comes bounding in the door. Even with promotion-winning pedigree, taking over a winning team is a tough job. Especially when Manchester United come after your best player.
| 4 | "The Old Enemy" | Sean Webb | Chris Grierson, Sean Webb & James Woodroof | 4 June 2021 |
The wheels have come off. Steve Parish's nightmare of Bolton beating Palace to the play-offs is a real possibility. Something stinks on the south coast and Ollie is raging.
| 5 | "Standing on the Edge of Greatness" | Sean Webb | Chris Grierson, Sean Webb & James Woodroof | 4 June 2021 |
Excitement builds for the fans as the big day out at Wembley nears, but it's business as usual for Ollie and his boys. No sunshine break on a beach, just a 39 year-old on a bench.
