= George Irving =

George Irving may refer to:

- George Irving (American actor) (1874–1961), American film actor and director
- George Irving (English actor) (born 1954), British television actor
- George S. Irving (1922–2016), American theatre actor
- George Vere Irving (1815–1869), Scottish lawyer and antiquary

== See also ==
- George Irvine (disambiguation)
- George Irwin (disambiguation)
