= Selhurst Park =

Football stadium in London, England

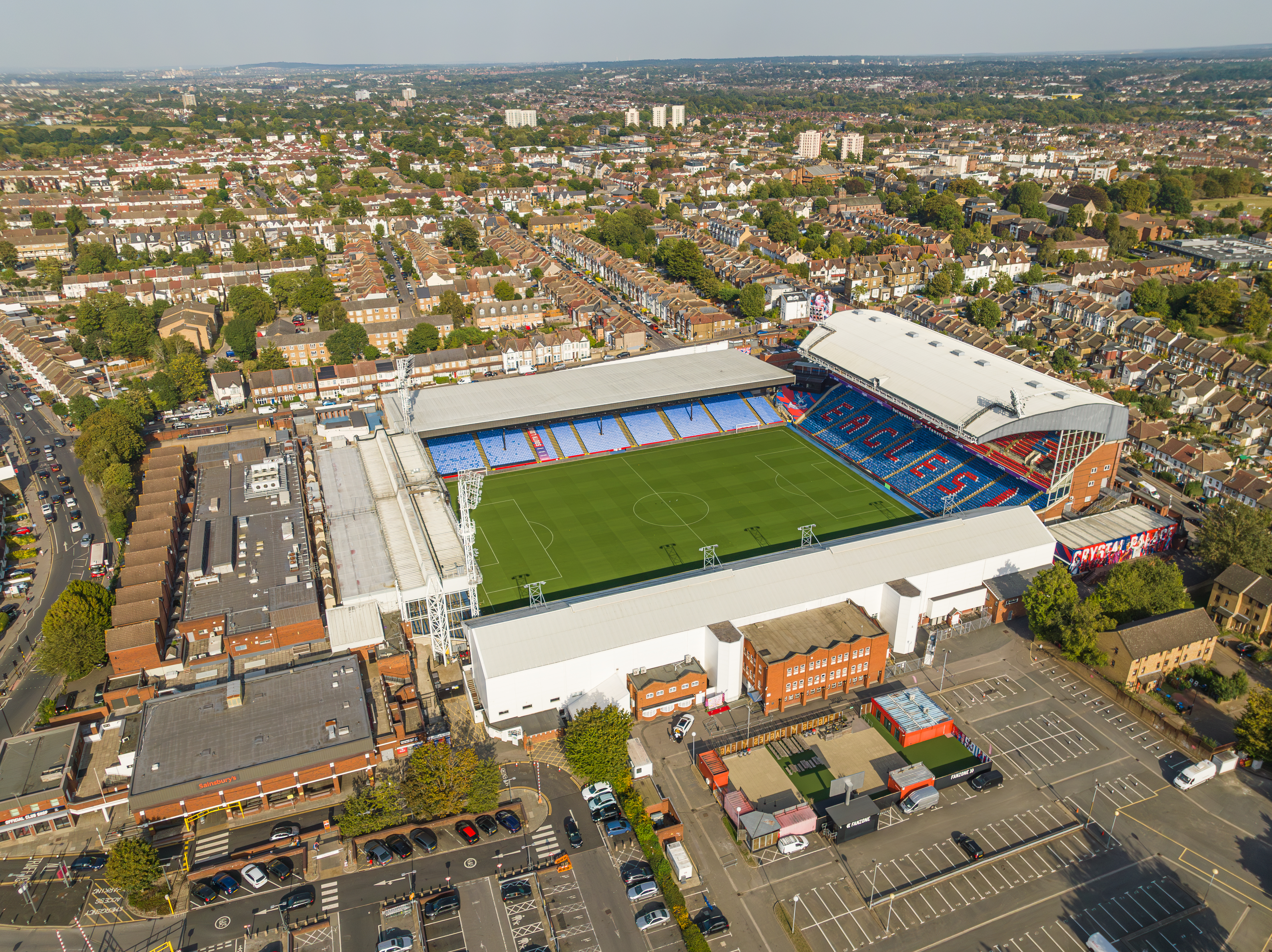
- Selhurst Park aerial view (2023); UEFA
- Interactive map of Selhurst Park
- Full name: Selhurst Park
- Location: Selhurst, London, SE25; England
- Coordinates: 51°23′54″N 0°5′8″W
- Owner: Crystal Palace
- Capacity: 25,194
- Surface: GrassMaster
- Scoreboard: JumboTron
- Field size: 101 by 68 metres (110.5 yd × 74.4 yd)
- Public transit: Norwood Junction; Selhurst; Thornton Heath

Construction
- Groundbreaking: 1922 / 1923
- Built: 1924
- Opened: 30 August 1924; 102 years ago
- Renovated: 1983, 1995, 2013, 2014
- Expanded: 1969, 1994
- Cost: £ 30,000
- Architect: Archibald Leitch
- Structural engineer: Humphreys of Kensington

Tenants
- Crystal Palace (1924–present); Charlton Athletic (1985–1991); Wimbledon (1991–2003)

Selhurst Park is a football stadium in Selhurst, in the London Borough of Croydon, England. It serves as the home ground of Premier League club Crystal Palace. The stadium was designed by Archibald Leitch and opened in 1924. It has hosted international football, as well as games for the 1948 Summer Olympics. It was shared by Charlton Athletic from 1985 to 1991 and Wimbledon from 1991 to 2003.

== History ==
In 1922, a former brickfield site was bought from the London, Brighton and South Coast Railway Company for £2,750 by Crystal Palace F.C.. The club had been pursuing a deal for the ground as early as 25 February 1919. The stadium was designed by Scottish architect Archibald Leitch, and constructed by Humphreys of Kensington (a firm regularly used by Leitch) for around £30,000. It was officially opened by the Lord Mayor of London on 30 August 1924. There was then only one stand, the present Main Stand, but this was unfinished due to industrial action. Crystal Palace played The Wednesday and lost 0–1 in front of 25,000 fans.

Two years later, on St David's Day in 1926, England played Wales in an international match at the stadium. England amateur matches and various other finals were also staged there, as were other sports including boxing, bicycle polo (in the late 1940s), and cricket and music concerts (in the 1980s). In addition to this, it hosted two games for the 1948 Summer Olympics.

In 1953, the stadium's first floodlights were installed, consisting of numerous poles around the 3 sides of terracing and four roof-mounted installations on the Main Stand. They were replaced nine years later by floodlights mounted on pylons in each corner, and six installations on the Main Stand roof. Real Madrid marked the occasion by playing under the new set of bulbs – a real footballing coup at the time for third division Palace, as it was Real's first ever match in London.

The ground remained undeveloped until 1969, when Palace were promoted to Division One (then the highest tier of English football) for the first time. The Arthur Wait Stand was built, named after the club's long-serving chairman, who was a builder by trade and was often seen working on the site himself. Arthur Wait was notable for overseeing Palace's rise from the Fourth to the First Division, in the 1960s. The Whitehorse Lane end was given a new look when a "second tier" of terracing, brick-built refreshments and toilets were provided along the top.

The Safety of Sports Grounds Act 1975 required the Holmesdale Road terrace (the preferred stand for the Crystal Palace supporters) to be split into three sections for safety reasons. The remaining poorer facilities were mainly where opposition supporters were situated. New facilities were subsequently built at the back of the Holmesdale Stand. In the summer of 1981, the Main Stand terraced enclosure was redesigned and refitted with seating. This year also saw Palace sell the back of the Whitehorse Lane terrace and adjacent land to supermarket retailer Sainsbury's for £2m, to help their financial problems. The size of the terrace at this end was effectively halved.

Charlton Athletic moved into the stadium as temporary tenants in 1985, and became with Palace the first league clubs in England to agree such a ground-sharing scheme. The following year, Palace chairman Ron Noades purchased the stadium from the club as a means of raising revenue. In the summer of 1990, the lower half of the Arthur Wait Stand was converted to all-seater with the assistance of Football Trust Grant Aid, following the Taylor Report into the Hillsborough Disaster. Two rows of executive boxes (48 in total) were constructed above the Whitehorse Lane terrace (on the roof of Sainsbury's supermarket) in 1991, and this was subsequently roofed and made all-seater in the summer of 1993.

Charlton moved back to The Valley via West Ham's Boleyn Ground, and Wimbledon F.C. replaced them as tenants in 1991. The Holmesdale terrace was demolished in 1994 and replaced a year later with a two-tiered 8,500 capacity stand. The roof cladding of the main stand was also replaced, the previous one having started to leak. Some 25 years on, this remains the most recent major work to be carried out at Selhurst Park.

When Mark Goldberg bought Crystal Palace F.C. in 1998, he just owned the club and not the stadium. Former Palace chairman Ron Noades retained ownership of Selhurst Park, having purchased it from the club in 1986. Simon Jordan became chairman in 2000, and took out a ten-year lease on the stadium upon his purchase of Crystal Palace, with Noades receiving rent from the club. When Wimbledon relocated to Milton Keynes in 2003, a section of their fans had already decamped to the newly established AFC Wimbledon in protest, when the old club were given permission by the FA to move in 2002.

Jordan stated that he had completed a purchase of the freehold of Selhurst Park from Altonwood Limited (Ron Noades' company) for £12m in October 2006. However, he never owned the freehold or had any interest in it and his reasons for claiming he had bought it are still unknown. Ownership was in fact held by Selhurst Park Limited, a joint venture between HBOS and the Rock property empire owned by Paul Kemsley, a former director of Tottenham Hotspur. In April 2008, a 25-year lease was granted to Crystal Palace at an annual rent of £1.2m.

The Rock Group went into administration in June 2009, the management of the freehold was taken on by PwC acting on behalf of Lloyds Bank, which now own HBOS. PwC expected to sell it within two years. The club and Selhurst Park stadium were purchased by the CPFC 2010 consortium in June 2010, leading to the stadium and football club being united in a company for the first time since 1998.

In 2011, the club announced proposals to move back to their original home at the National Stadium. In June 2012, Crystal Palace co-chairman Steve Parish approached Rugby Union team London Welsh about a possible ground-share. London Welsh's promotion to the English Premiership was in doubt, as their plans to play their matches at Kassam Stadium were deemed unsuitable by the RFU.

In 2018, the club announced that a £100m renovation of Selhurst Park was imminent, to bring it closer in terms of quality to modern Premier League grounds. However, the expansion was delayed due to the Covid-19 pandemic, and the club's focus on delivering its Academy upgrade at Beckenham, completed in 2021. When the club finally focused again on the stand expansion, further delays occurred due to opposition to the demolition of houses in nearby Wooderson Close which was resolved when the club signed a legal agreement to provide replacement homes to relocate residents. In August 2024, the expansion was re-approved by Croydon Council and demolition works commenced in June 2026, with proposed completion by the early part of 2029.

Selhurst Park was used in the Apple TV+ series Ted Lasso as Nelson Road, the fictional home stadium of AFC Richmond.

On 15 June 2024, Chris Billam-Smith successfully defended his WBO cruiserweight championship against hometown boxer Richard Riakporhe in a rematch of their 2019 bout. The event at the stadium was attended by approximately 15,000 fans.

== The stands ==
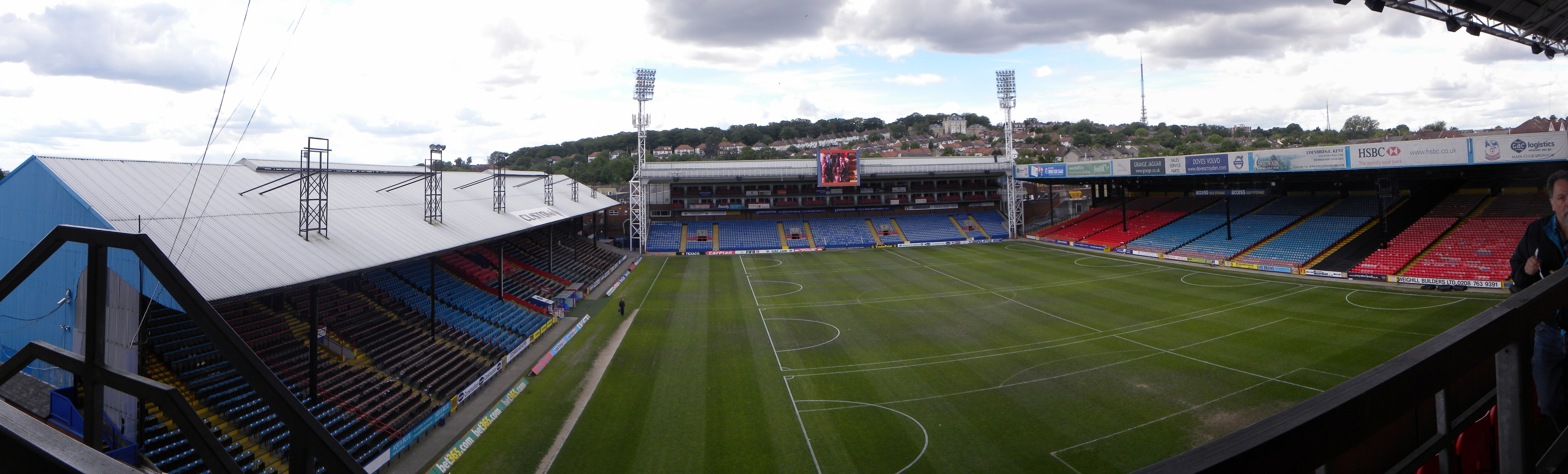

=== Holmesdale Road Stand ===
Capacity of stand: 8,329

The Holmesdale is a double-tiered stand (Lower tier 5,510, Upper tier 2,819). Built in 1994, this is the newest stand in the stadium, which replaced the previous terrace end. It forms the south-east end of the stadium.

=== Arthur Wait Stand ===
Capacity of stand: 9,574

Part of this stand seats the away supporters (approx. 3,000). It was opened in 1969, and named after the then Palace chairman. It forms the north-east side of the stadium.

=== Main Stand ===
Capacity of stand: 5,460 + Press seats (63)

This original stand opened in 1924 and forms the south-west side of the stadium. It includes the Directors Box, and offices/main entrance that were built at the rear of the stand during the 1990s. The exterior of the stand has been re-cladded in white replacing the old original blue painted corrugated iron. New seats were also installed during the summer of 2013, including several lounges/bars and a restaurant situated within the stand. With new investment confirmed, the club put forward plans for this stand to be redeveloped into a three-tier structure (13,500-seater), building over then removing the current stand (extending overall stadium capacity to 34,000). The new stand will feature an all-glass frontage, inspired by the original Crystal Palace. It was approved at a Croydon Council meeting on 19 April 2018, and the club had planned for the work to start in summer 2019, with the new stand to be ready in time for the 2021–22 season. However, various delays put back the work, which eventually commenced in 2026, to be completed by early 2029.

=== Whitehorse Lane Stand ===
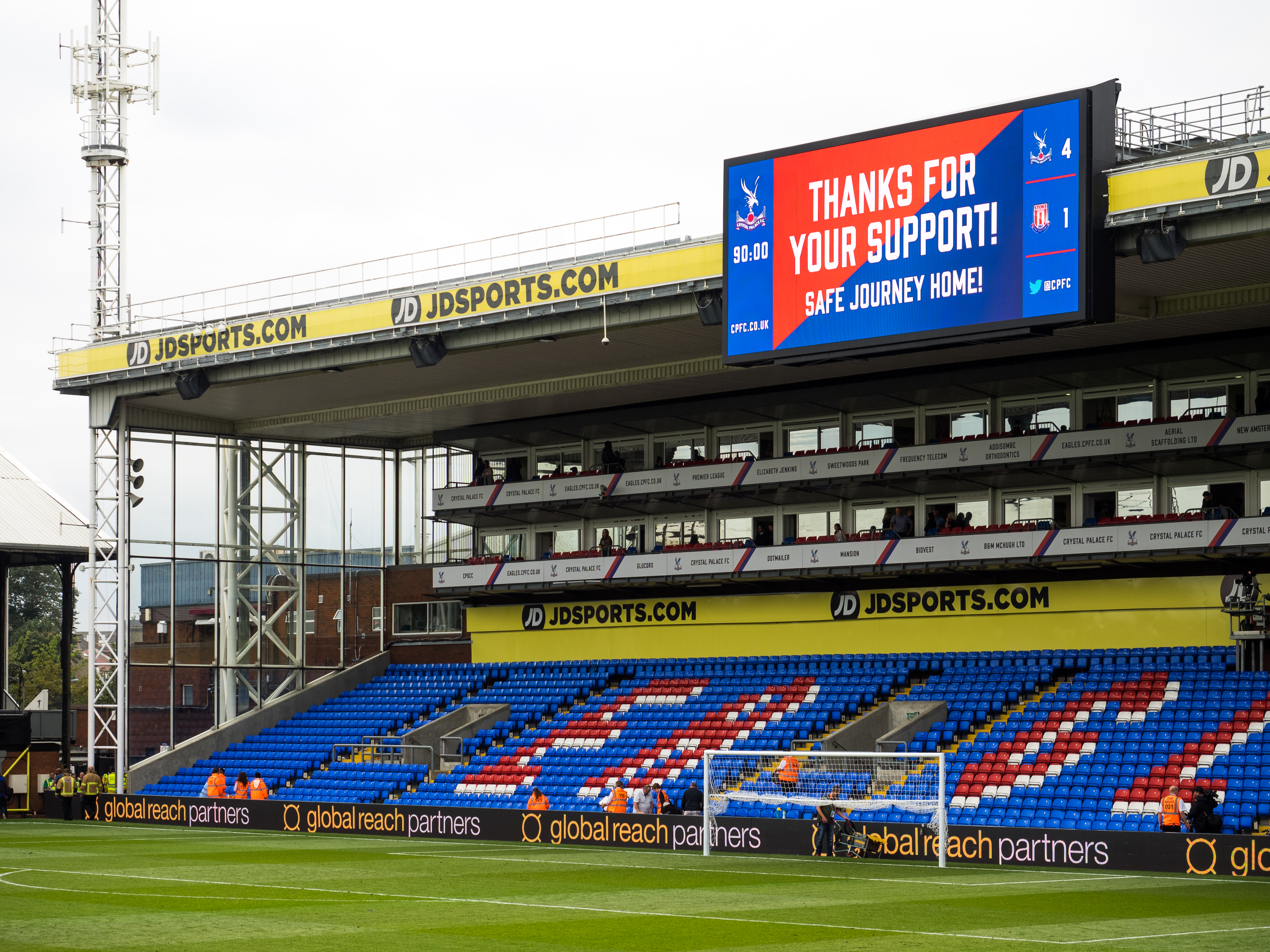
Whitehorse Lane Stand with the Jumbotron

Capacity of stand: 2,219 + seating for executive boxes (480)

Originally built as a standing terrace, it was redeveloped in the early 1980s. It is also known as the Family Stand for Crystal Palace supporters. The stand includes 24 luxury Executive Boxes. It forms the north-west end of the stadium.

== Attendance ==
=== Average ===
Season	Average Attendance	League	Reference
2025–26	24,925	Premier League	
2024–25	25,064	Premier League	
2023–24	24,937	Premier League	
2022–23	25,551	Premier League	
2021–22	24,282	Premier League	
2020–21	446* Due to COVID-19 restrictions	Premier League	
2019–20	19,784	Premier League	
2018–19	25,455	Premier League	
2017–18	25,036	Premier League	
2016–17	25,161	Premier League	
2015–16	24,636	Premier League	
2014–15	24,421	Premier League	
2013–14	24,375	Premier League	
2012–13	17,280	Football League Championship	
2011–12	15,219	Football League Championship	
2010–11	15,351	Football League Championship	
2009–10	14,945	Football League Championship	
2008–09	15,220	Football League Championship	
2007–08	16,030	Football League Championship	
2006–07	17,541	Football League Championship	
2005–06	19,457	Football League Championship	
2004–05	24,108	Premier League	

=== Records ===
The record attendance at Selhurst Park was achieved in 1979, when 51,482 saw Crystal Palace defeat Burnley 2–0 to clinch the Football League Second Division championship title. The stadium also holds the attendance record of 37,774 for a Division Four match (now League Two in the English football pyramid), when Crystal Palace played local rivals Millwall in 1961.

Selhurst Park recorded the lowest attendance for a Premier League game – 3,039 for Wimbledon v Everton on 26 January 1993.

== See also ==
- List of football stadiums in England
- List of stadiums in the United Kingdom by capacity
- Lists of stadiums
