= Crystal Palace F.C. =

Association football club in London, England

Crystal Palace
- Full name: Crystal Palace Football Club
- Nicknames: The Eagles; The Glaziers (Note: Historical. Still used today, although uncommon.)
- Short name: Palace; CPFC
- Founded: 10 September 1905; 121 years ago (Note: The professional Crystal Palace F.C. was established in 1905, but claim to be a continuation of the original amateur football team formed in 1861.)
- Stadium: Selhurst Park
- Capacity: 25,194
- Owners: Woody Johnson (43%); Josh Harris (10%); David Blitzer (10%); Steve Parish (10%)
- Chairman: Steve Parish
- Manager: Thomas Frank
- League: Premier League
- 2025–26: Premier League, 15th of 20
- Website: cpfc.co.uk
Home colours	Away colours	Third colours

Crystal Palace Football Club, often referred to simply as Palace, is a professional football club based in Selhurst, South London, England, which competes in the Premier League, the highest level of English football. The club was established as a professional outfit in 1905 at the Crystal Palace exhibition building, but has origins as far back as 1861. They used the FA Cup Final stadium inside the exhibition grounds for their home games between 1905 and 1915, when the club were forced to leave due to the outbreak of the First World War. In 1924, the club moved to their current home at Selhurst Park.

Palace spent their early years as a professional club playing in the Southern League, before being elected to the Football League in 1920, and have mainly competed in the top two tiers of English football during their league history following the 1960s. Since 1964, the club has only dropped below the second tier once, for just three seasons between 1974 and 1977. During the late 1980s and early 1990s, they enjoyed a successful period as a top-flight club. After reaching the 1990 FA Cup final, Palace then challenged Arsenal and Liverpool for the English league title in 1990–91, eventually ending the season in third place, their highest league finish. Palace missed out on UEFA Cup qualification because of the limited number of places available to English top-flight clubs after the Heysel Stadium disaster. The club were also founder members of the inaugural Premier League in 1992–93.

However, the club was soon to suffer a severe decline in fortunes after their relegation from the top-flight in 1998. This was due to financial problems which saw Palace go into administration twice, in 1999 and 2010. They steadily recovered and since their promotion back to the Premier League in 2013, Palace have achieved a club record-extending fourteenth consecutive top-flight season as of 2026–27, as well as reaching two more FA Cup finals in 2016 and 2025, with victory in the latter final resulting in the club's first major trophy in their history. The club followed up this success by winning their first FA Community Shield title that same year. Palace then won their first European trophy, the 2025–26 UEFA Conference League.

The club's kit colours were claret and blue until 1973, when they changed to the red and blue vertical stripes worn today. Palace have a long-standing and fierce rivalry with Brighton & Hove Albion that emerged in the 1970s for competitive reasons. Other strong rivalries exist with nearby Millwall and Charlton Athletic, against whom they contest the South London derbies.

== History ==
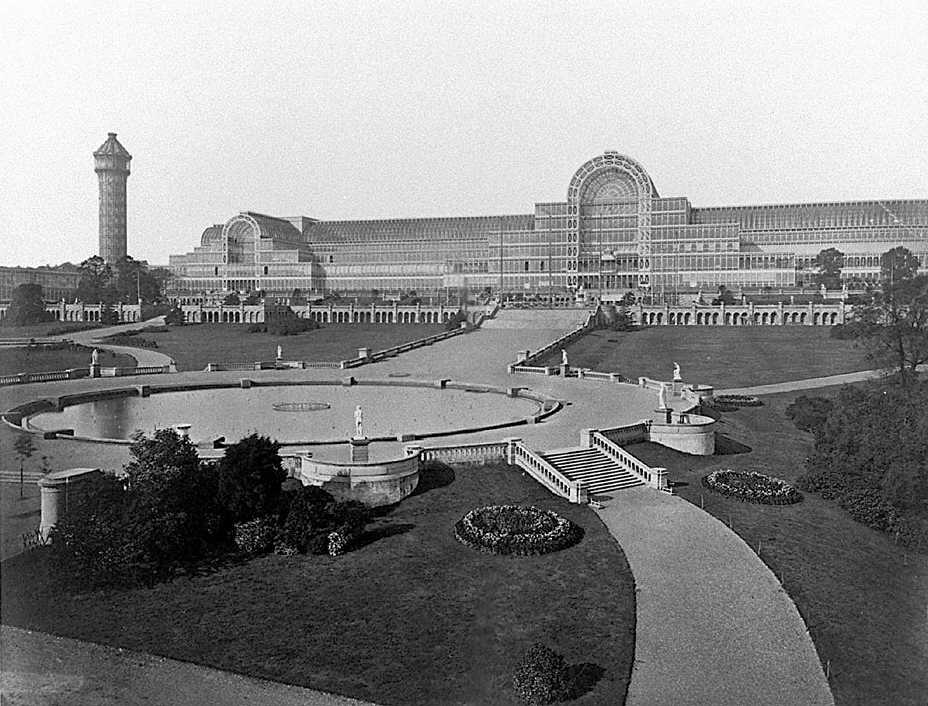
The Crystal Palace Exhibition building (1854)

=== The Exhibition Palace and FA Cup Final venue (1854–1905) ===
In 1854, the Crystal Palace exhibition building had been relocated from Hyde Park, London, and rebuilt in an area of South London next to Sydenham Hill. The surrounding area was renamed Crystal Palace and included the Crystal Palace Park, where various sports facilities were built. In 1857, the Crystal Palace Cricket Club was established here using the cricket ground inside the park. Its members later lobbied for a continuation of sporting activities during the winter months and set up an amateur Crystal Palace football team, who became founder members of the Football Association in 1863. They competed in the first FA Cup competition in 1871–72, reaching the semi-finals and played in the FA Cup over the next four seasons, but disappeared from historical records around December 1875.

In 1895, the Football Association found a new permanent venue for the FA Cup final to be played at the sports stadium situated inside the exhibition building grounds. Some years later, the Crystal Palace Company who owned the Palace and its grounds and were reliant on tourist activity for their income, sought fresh attractions for the venue and decided to form a new professional football club to play at the stadium. The owners wanted a club to play there and tap into the vast crowd potential of the area.

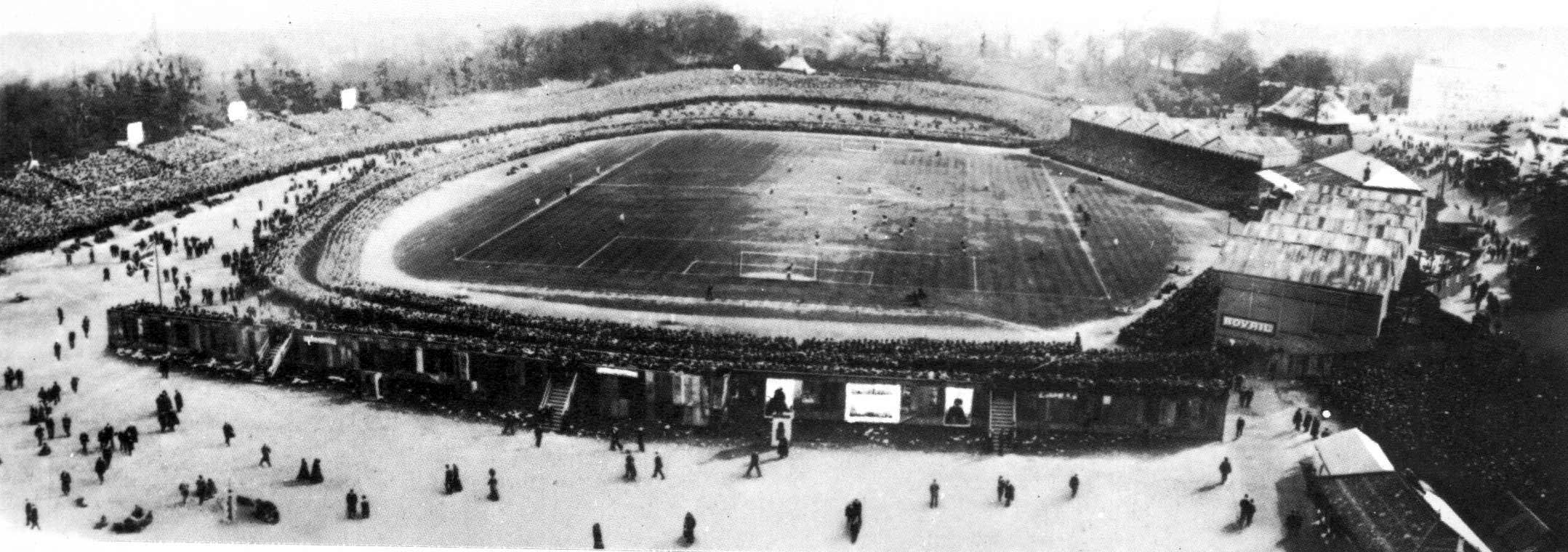
The 1905 FA Cup final at the Crystal Palace Stadium.

=== Birth of the professional club and the Southern League (1905–1920) ===
The professional Crystal Palace Football Club was formed on 10 September 1905 under the guidance of Aston Villa assistant secretary Edmund Goodman, who later became Palace's longest ever serving manager. The club applied for election to the Football League, but were rejected and instead found itself in the Southern League Second Division for the 1905–06 season. Palace were successful in their inaugural campaign, achieving promotion to the Southern League First Division, after being crowned as champions. They also played in the mid-week United League, finishing runners-up to Watford, and it was in this competition that the club played their first match, winning 3–0 away to New Brompton.

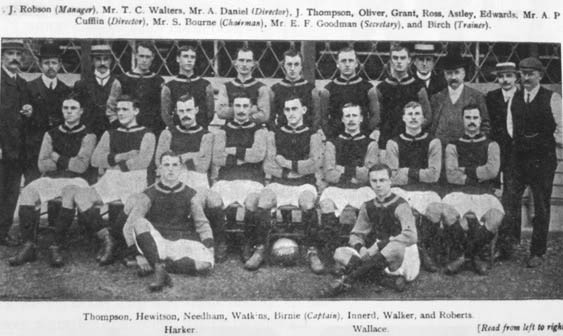
The Crystal Palace F.C. squad (1905–06).

In 1907, in a shock first round victory, Crystal Palace beat Newcastle United 1–0 in the FA Cup. An even greater upset occurred two years later, in 1909, when Palace defeated FA Cup holders Wolves in the first round of that year's competition, becoming the first non-league side to eliminate the cup holders. Palace remained in the Southern League until 1920, but were forced to leave the Cup final venue in 1915 due to the outbreak of the First World War, which led to the Admiralty requisitioning the Crystal Palace and its grounds. The club moved to the home of nearby West Norwood at the Herne Hill Velodrome. Three years later, they moved again to the Nest following the demise of Croydon Common F.C..

==== 1913 FA Cup final bombing ====
The Palace stadium was almost destroyed in an attempted terrorist bombing of the 1913 FA Cup final, when the suffragettes of the Women's Social and Political Union, plotted to blow up the stands. This was part of the suffragette bombing and arson campaign, in which the suffragettes carried out a series of politically motivated bombing and arson attacks nationwide, as part of their campaign for women's suffrage.

=== Into the Football League (1920–1958) ===
The club became founder members of the new Football League Third Division in the 1920–21 season, finishing as champions and gaining promotion to the Second Division. This achievement meant they joined Preston North End, Small Heath, Liverpool, and Bury as the only clubs at that time to have won a championship in their first season as a league club. Palace then moved to a new stadium Selhurst Park in 1924, where the club still play their home games today.

The opening fixture at Selhurst Park was against The Wednesday, with Palace losing 0–1 in front of a crowd of 25,000. Finishing in twenty-first position, the club were relegated to the Third Division South. Before the Second World War, Palace made good efforts at promotion, mostly finishing in the top half of the table and were runners-up on three occasions. During the war years, the Football League was suspended, and the club won two Wartime Leagues. After the war, Palace were less successful in the league, their highest position being seventh, and conversely on three occasions the club had to apply for re-election.

=== Historic Real Madrid visit and promotion to the top-flight (1958–1973) ===
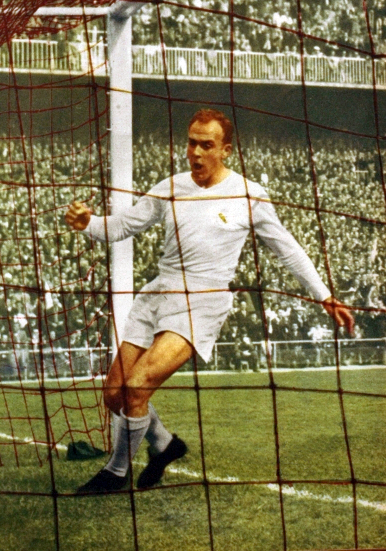
Alfredo Di Stéfano, who played for Real Madrid against Palace in 1962. The Croydon Advertiser reported that his "move that led to Madrid's fourth goal was conducted with effortless ease at walking pace."

The club remained in the Third Division South up until the end of the 1957–58 season, after which the Football League was restructured with clubs in the bottom half of the Third Division South merging with those in the bottom half of the Third Division North to form a new Fourth Division. Palace had finished fourteenth – just below the cut – and were consigned to the basement of English football. Their stay was only brief. Palace chairman Arthur Wait appointed the ex-Tottenham manager Arthur Rowe towards the end of the 1959–60 season, and his exciting style of football was a joy to watch for the Palace fans. The following season saw Palace gain promotion and they also achieved distinction in April 1962, when they played the great Real Madrid team of that era in an historic friendly match. This was the first time that the Spanish giants had ever played a match in London and was only two weeks before they were due to play Benfica in the European Cup final. A full strength Madrid team beat Palace 4–3. Although Rowe resigned for health reasons towards the end of 1962, the club continued its momentum. Dick Graham and then Bert Head guided Palace to successive promotions in 1963–64 and 1968–69, taking the club through the Second Division and into the heights of the First Division.

Palace's first ever spell in the top-flight of English football lasted from 1969 until 1973, and they achieved some memorable results, arguably the best was a 5–0 home win against Manchester United in the 1972–73 season. Arthur Wait stepped down as chairman during that season and was replaced by Raymond Bloye who appointed Malcolm Allison as manager in March 1973, with Bert Head moving upstairs to become general manager. Unfortunately, the managerial change came too late to save the club from relegation back to the Second Division.

=== Bouncing between the divisions (1973–1984) ===
After the disappointment of demotion from the top-flight, the next season was to prove even worse for the club. Under the management of Allison, Palace suffered a second consecutive relegation, and found itself back in Division Three for the 1974–75 season. It was also under Allison that the club changed its nickname from "The Glaziers" to "The Eagles", and ended its association with claret and blue kit colours by changing to the red and blue vertical stripes worn today. Palace enjoyed a run to the semi-finals of the 1975–76 FA Cup, beating Leeds and Chelsea along the way, but lost 0–2 in the semi-final at Stamford Bridge to the eventual winners, Southampton. Allison resigned at the end of the 1975–76 season after failing to get the club out of the third tier, and it was under Terry Venables' management that Palace moved back up to the top-flight with promotions in 1976–77 and 1978–79; the latter saw the club crowned as Division Two champions.

That team from 1979 was dubbed the "Team of the Eighties" by the media, because it included a number of very talented young players who had emerged from the youth team which won the FA Youth Cup in 1976–77 and 1977–78, and they were briefly top of the whole Football League in the early part of the 1979–80 season. However, financial difficulties suffered by the club caused the break-up of that group of players, and this ultimately led to Palace being unable to maintain its position in the top-flight. Palace were relegated from the First Division in 1980–81, coinciding with Ron Noades' takeover of the club. They struggled back in the second tier and Noades even appointed the ex-Brighton manager Alan Mullery, which was very unpopular with the Palace fans.

=== Steve Coppell years (1984–1993) ===
On 4 June 1984, the former Manchester United and England player Steve Coppell, who had recently retired from the game due to injury, was appointed as Palace manager. Coppell rebuilt the club steadily over the next few years which resulted in the Eagles achieving promotion back to the First Division via the play-offs in 1988–89. Palace followed this up by reaching the 1990 FA Cup final, drawing 3–3 with Manchester United after extra-time in the first match, but losing the replay 0–1. The club was able to build on this success and the 1990–91 campaign saw Palace challenge Arsenal and Liverpool for the English league title, eventually ending the season in third place, the highest league finish in the club's history. Palace missed out on a European place at the end of that season partly because of the UEFA ban on English clubs caused by the Heysel Stadium disaster. Though by that time the ban had been lifted, it meant that England were unranked in the UEFA coefficient rankings used that season, and this resulted in the English top-flight only being entitled to one European place in the UEFA Cup, which went to the runners-up Liverpool. The club also returned to Wembley and won the Full Members Cup, beating Everton 4–1 after extra-time in the final. During the following season, star striker Ian Wright left the club to join Arsenal. Palace finished tenth, and became a founder member of the new Premier League in 1992–93.

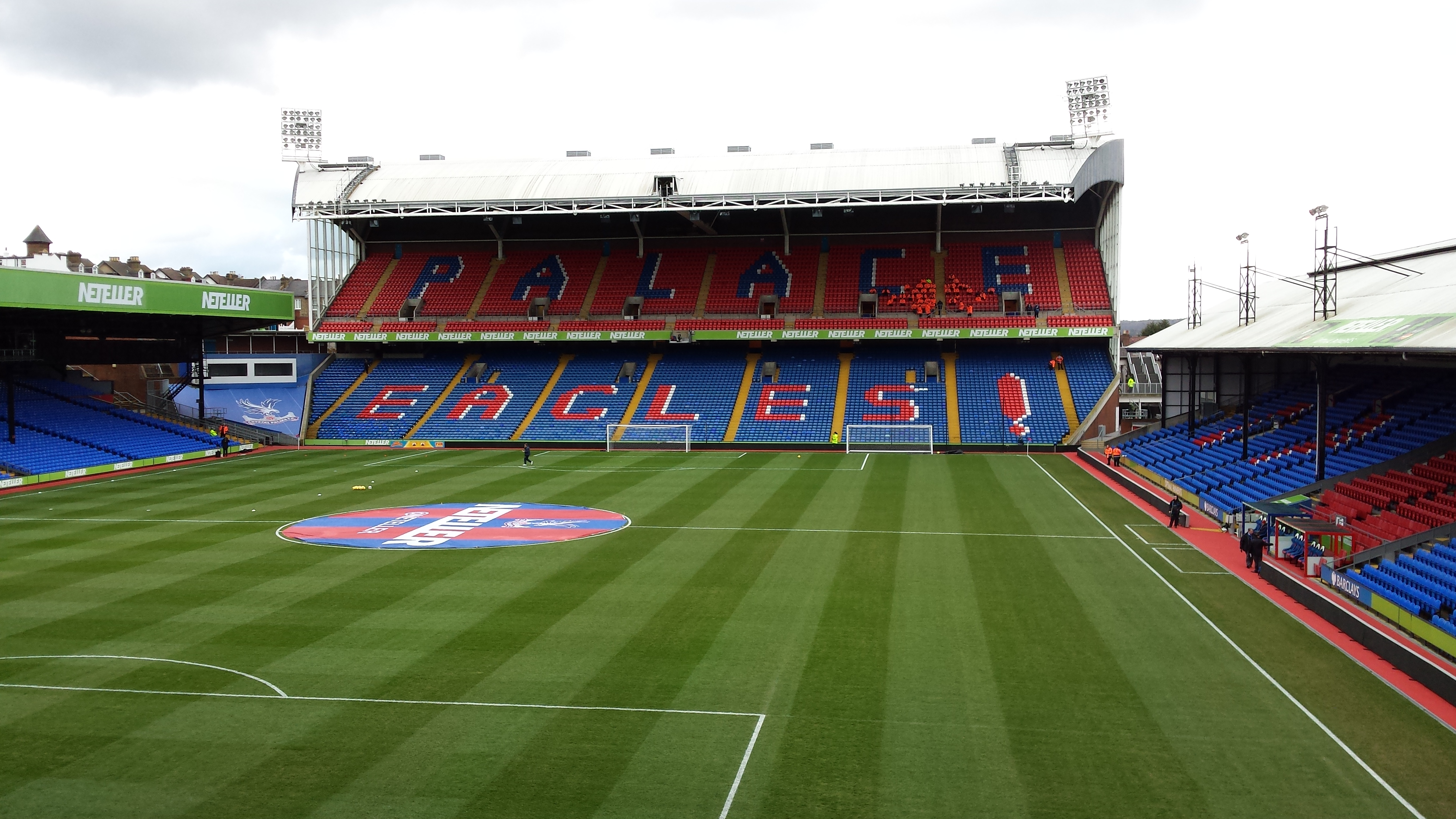
The Holmesdale Road stand at Selhurst Park, was constructed in 1994–95.

Palace then sold their other top striker Mark Bright to Sheffield Wednesday and struggled to score goals throughout the next season which ended with the club relegated (Losing the final safety spot to Oldham Athletic, who had a superior goal difference of -11, against Palace's -13). The Eagles also finished on 49 points, which set a Premier League record that still stands today, for the highest number of points for a relegated club. Coppell resigned and Alan Smith, his assistant at the club, took over as manager.

=== The yo-yo years (1993–1998) ===
Alan Smith's first season as manager saw Palace win the First Division title and gain promotion back to the Premier League. Their stay on this occasion proved both eventful and controversial. On 25 January 1995, Palace played Manchester United at Selhurst Park in which United forward Eric Cantona was sent off. He was taunted by Palace fan Matthew Simmons, and retaliated with a flying kick. Cantona was sentenced to two weeks in jail, reduced to 120 hours community service on appeal. Simmons was immediately banned from Selhurst Park and later found guilty on two charges of threatening Cantona. More was to follow in March, when Palace striker Chris Armstrong was suspended by the FA for failing a drugs test. On the field, Smith guided the club to the semi-finals of both the FA Cup and League Cup, but their form in the league was inconsistent and Palace once again found themselves relegated, finishing fourth from bottom as the Premier League was reduced from 22 to 20 clubs.

Smith left the club and Steve Coppell returned as technical director in the summer of 1995, and through a combination of the first-team coaching of Ray Lewington and latterly Dave Bassett's managership, Palace reached the play-offs. They lost the 1996 First Division play-off final in dramatic fashion when Steve Claridge scored in the last minute of extra-time for Leicester City to win 2–1. The following season saw Coppell take charge as first-team manager when Bassett departed for Nottingham Forest in early 1997. The club reached the play-offs for the second year running and this time achieved promotion back to the Premier League, when they defeated Sheffield United 1–0 in the final at Wembley.

The club's third campaign in the Premier League was no more successful than the previous two, and in true yo-yo club fashion, Palace again suffered relegation back to the First Division at the end of the 1997–98 season. The club also had a new owner when recruitment tycoon Mark Goldberg completed his takeover in June 1998.

=== Financial crisis and recovery (1998–2013) ===
Terry Venables returned to Palace for a second spell after being appointed head coach and the club competed in European competition during the summer when they played in the UEFA Intertoto Cup. Palace then went into administration in 1999, when owner Mark Goldberg was unable to sustain his financial backing of the club. Venables left and Steve Coppell took over again as manager. The club emerged from administration under the ownership of Simon Jordan, and Coppell was replaced as manager by Alan Smith for a second time. Palace were almost relegated to the third tier in Jordan's first season, in 2000–01. Smith was sacked in April and long-serving coach Steve Kember took over as caretaker manager and he managed to win the two remaining fixtures that would guarantee Palace survival, with Dougie Freedman scoring the winner in the 87th minute on the final day of the season, securing a 1–0 victory over Stockport County. Former Manchester United captain Steve Bruce was appointed the new permanent manager for the 2001–02 season. After a promising start to the campaign, which gave Palace hope for a promotion challenge, Bruce attempted to walk out on the club after just four months in charge following an approach from Birmingham City to become their new manager. Palace put Bruce on gardening leave, but eventually allowed him to join Birmingham. He was succeeded by Trevor Francis, who had been his predecessor at the West Midlands club.

Under Francis, Palace finished mid-table for two successive seasons, but he was then sacked, and replaced by Steve Kember, who became permanent manager. The club won their opening three games of the 2003–04 season under Kember, which put them at the top of the table, but he was sacked in November after a terrible loss of form saw Palace slip towards the relegation zone. Former Palace striker Iain Dowie was appointed manager and guided the club to the play-off final, securing promotion with a 1–0 victory over West Ham. Again Palace could not maintain their place in the top-tier and were relegated on the last day of the following season, after drawing at local rivals Charlton Athletic.

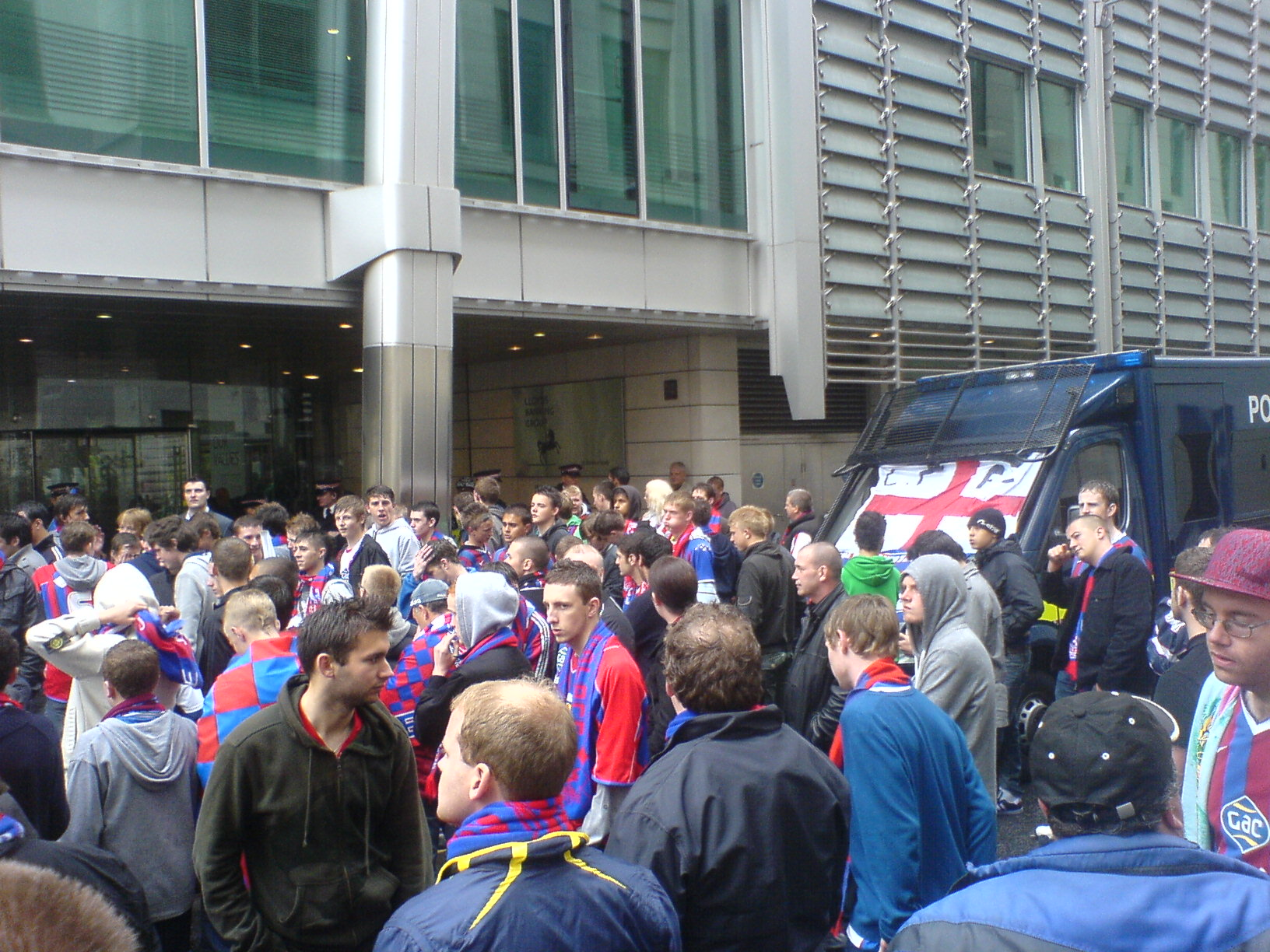
Crystal Palace fans protest – and await anxiously for news – outside the Lloyds HQ in London on 1 June 2010.

Following that relegation, Simon Jordan was unable to put the club on a sound financial footing over the next few years and in January 2010, Palace were once again placed in administration, this time by a creditor. Due to the Football League's regulations, the club were deducted ten points, and the administrators P&A Partnership were forced to sell key players including Victor Moses and José Fonte. The Palace manager at that time, Neil Warnock, also departed the club in March. He had been appointed in the autumn of 2007, to replace former fans favourite Peter Taylor, who had a brief spell as manager. Paul Hart took over as caretaker manager for the final weeks of the season and survival in the Championship was only secured on the final day of the season after a memorable 2–2 draw at Sheffield Wednesday, which was itself relegated as a result.

During the close of that season, a consortium of several wealthy fans known as CPFC 2010, successfully negotiated the purchase of the club. They were led by Steve Parish, the vocal representative for the consortium of four that also included Stephen Browett, Jeremy Hosking and Martin Long. Crucially, the consortium also secured the freehold of Selhurst Park and paid tribute to a fans' campaign which helped pressure Lloyds Bank into selling the ground back to the club.

The new owners swiftly appointed George Burley as Palace manager. However, a poor start to the following season saw the club hovering around the bottom of the table by December. On 1 January 2011, after a 0–3 defeat to Millwall, Burley was sacked and his assistant Dougie Freedman named caretaker manager. Just over a week later, Freedman was appointed as manager on a full-time basis. Palace moved up the table and by securing a 1–1 draw at Hull City on 30 April, the club was safe from relegation with one game of the season left. After another year and a half as manager, Freedman departed to manage Bolton Wanderers on 23 October 2012. The following month, he was replaced by Ian Holloway, who guided the club back to the Premier League after an eight-year absence by defeating Watford 1–0 in the Championship play-off final at the new Wembley Stadium.

=== Established back in the Premier League, FA Cup and European success (2013–present) ===
Holloway resigned in October 2013, after a poor start to the season. Tony Pulis took over and steered the club away from relegation from the Premier League for the first time, winning the 2013–14 Premier League Manager of the Season for doing so, but resigned two days before the start of the following campaign. Following an unsuccessful second tenure for Neil Warnock in the first half of the 2014–15 season, former Palace midfielder Alan Pardew was confirmed as the new manager in January 2015, and guided the club to a tenth-place finish, their highest placing achieved at that point in the Premier League. In the 2015–16 campaign, Pardew in his first full season led Palace to the 2016 FA Cup final, their first for 26 years, where they again faced Manchester United, losing 1–2 after extra-time. In December 2016, after a run of poor results, Pardew was sacked and replaced by Sam Allardyce, who kept the club in the Premier League, but resigned unexpectedly at the end of the 2016–17 season.

On 26 June 2017, Palace appointed Dutch coach Frank de Boer as their first permanent foreign manager. He was dismissed after only 77 days in charge, with the club having lost their first four league games at the start of the 2017–18 season while failing to score in any of them. The next day, on 12 September 2017, former England coach Roy Hodgson was appointed as the club's new manager, and he went on to ensure an eleventh-placed league finish that season, twelfth in the 2018–19 season and fourteenth in 2019–20. On 18 May 2021, the club announced Hodgson would be leaving at the end of the 2020–21 season, upon the expiration of his contract, having achieved a second consecutive fourteenth-place finish.

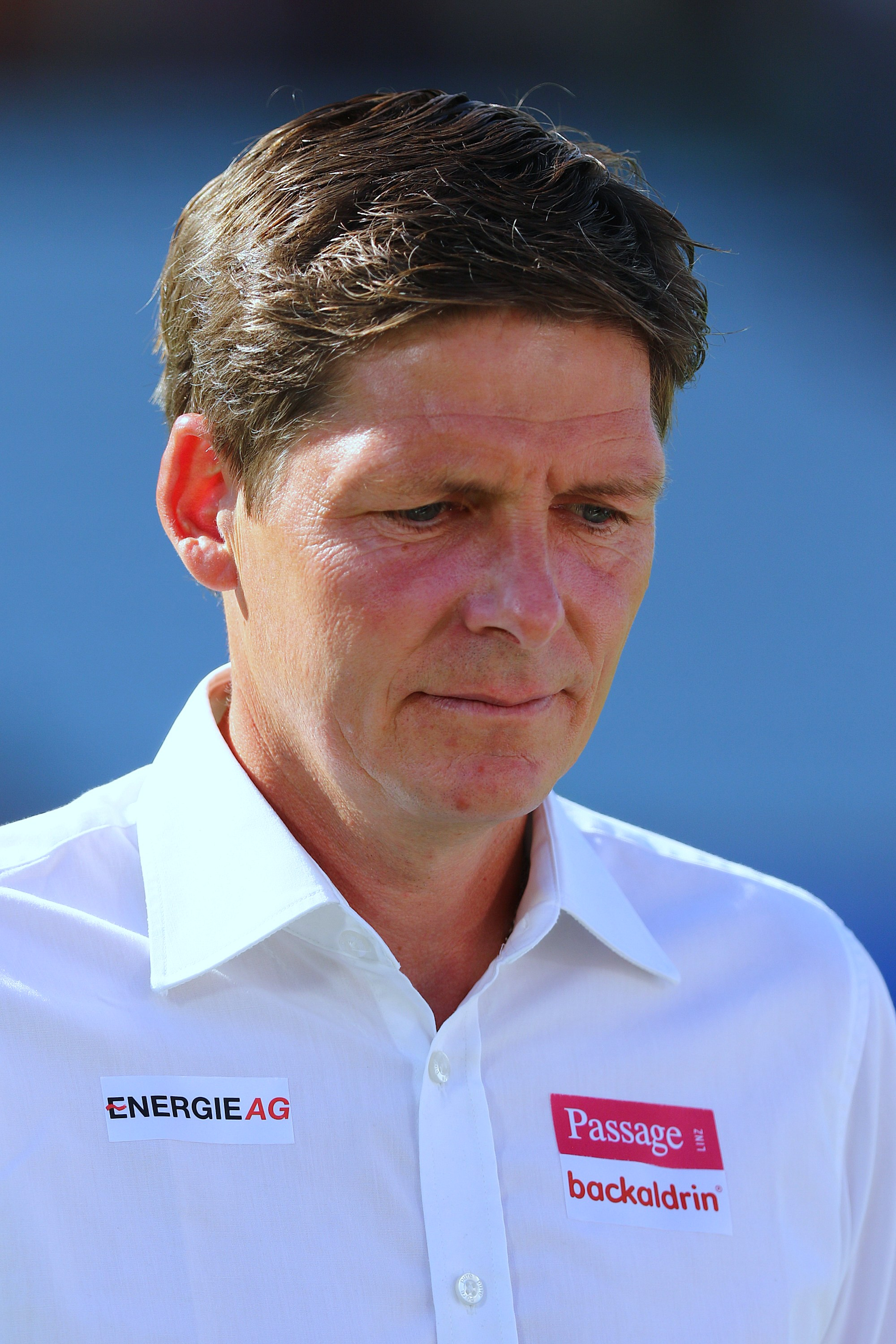
Oliver Glasner led Palace to their first major trophy, the FA Cup in 2025, and European football for the first time.

On 4 July 2021, Palace appointed Patrick Vieira, the former Arsenal captain, as their new manager on a three-year contract. Despite guiding the club to an FA Cup semi-final and a twelfth-place league finish in the 2021–22 season, Vieira was sacked during the following campaign on 17 March 2023, after a winless run of 12 games left the club three points above the relegation zone. On 21 March, Hodgson was re-appointed Palace manager until the end of the season. He guided the club to safety, finishing comfortably in eleventh place. On 3 July, he was appointed permanent manager for a second time, though he stepped down from the role midway through the 2023–24 season.

Hodgson was replaced by the Austrian and former Eintracht Frankfurt manager Oliver Glasner. Under Glasner, the club achieved a strong finish towards the end of the season, winning six of their last seven league games, and equalling the club's highest Premier League finish of tenth-place (in 2015). Subsequently, four Palace players (Eberechi Eze, Marc Guéhi, Dean Henderson and Adam Wharton) were named in the English national team for Euro 2024, more than any other club for England at the tournament.

In the 2024–25 campaign, Glasner led Palace to their first ever major trophy, with a goal from Eberechi Eze sealing a 1–0 victory over Manchester City in the 2025 FA Cup final, as well as ensuring qualification for the UEFA Europa League for the first time. However, the club's qualification was soon under threat due to UEFA's multi-club ownership rules. Palace's majority shareholder John Textor also owned French Ligue 1 club Lyon, who had qualified for the same competition. On 11 July 2025, UEFA ruled that Palace were in violation of UEFA's rules on multi-club ownership, which resulted in the club being demoted to the UEFA Conference League. Palace's appeal was rejected, with the Court of Arbitration for Sport (CAS) upholding UEFA's ruling on 11 August 2025.

The club began the 2025–26 season by winning their first FA Community Shield title, beating Liverpool 3–2 on penalties after the match finished 2–2 in normal time. Palace's victory saw them become the first club since Derby County in 1975, to win the trophy in their inaugural appearance in the competition. On 21 August, Palace faced Norwegian club Fredrikstad at Selhurst Park in the play-off round of the UEFA Conference League, the club's first official European match. Palace won the first-leg of the tie 1–0, with Jean-Philippe Mateta scoring their first ever European goal. The club advanced to the group stages of the competition after a goalless draw in the second-leg in Norway. Palace's defence of the FA Cup ended in the third round, when Macclesfield, a non-league team ranked 117 places below them, beat them 2–1 in one of the greatest shocks ever seen in the competition. The club did, however, progress through the group stages of the Conference League and knockout rounds to reach their first major European final. Palace defeated Spanish club Rayo Vallecano 1–0 on 27 May 2026 in Leipzig to secure their first European silverware and quality for the Europa League. Glasner left the club at the end of the season following the expiration of his contract.

On 15 June 2026, Frenchman Pierre Sage was appointed Palace's new manager on a three-year contract after an impressive spell in charge of Ligue 1 club RC Lens. However, after five months in the role, he was sacked on 12 November, having won five games out of 16 in all competitions, and with Palace bottom of the Premier League table after two wins in ten games. Four days later, the club appointed Danish manager Thomas Frank as his replacement.

== Ownership ==
First chairman Sydney Bourne with Edmund Goodman, 1906.

The Crystal Palace Company owned the professional Crystal Palace football club during the early years of its existence. The club's first chairman was Sydney Bourne, who was found by club secretary Edmund Goodman after he had examined records of FA Cup final ticket purchasers. Goodman noted his name as one that had bought a number of tickets every year, and met with Bourne who was enthused by the idea of the new club. Bourne was invited onto the board of directors and elected chairman at the club's first meeting. He remained chairman until his death in 1930.

After Bourne's death, there were a number of short-term chairmanship appointments: Louis Bellatti (1930–1935), R.S. Flew (1935), Carey Burnett (1935–36), E.T. Truett (1936–1939), before Percy Harper's reign (1939–1950). Local builder Arthur Wait established a consortium of seven other businessmen to purchase the club in 1949, and took over from Harper in 1950, initially rotating the chairmanship. In 1958, Wait became the permanent chairman, lasting until 1972 when Raymond Bloye took over. Bloye's ownership lasted until 26 January 1981, when property developer Ron Noades and his consortium took control of the club. Noades eventually sold the club to Mark Goldberg on 5 June 1998, becoming the second-longest serving Palace chairman behind Sydney Bourne. However, Noades did maintain ownership of Selhurst Park, leasing it to the club to use. Goldberg's tenure of the club was not a success and Palace entered administration in March 1999. Although the fans established a group called the Crystal Palace Supporters' Trust in a bid to gain control of the club, millionaire and lifelong fan Simon Jordan negotiated a deal with creditors and the administrator, and a new company, CPFC 2000 took control. This company entered administration in January 2010, and it was not until June of that year that a takeover was completed by a consortium of four wealthy fans known as CPFC 2010.

CPFC 2010 was established by a consortium of four businessmen, Steve Parish, Martin Long, Stephen Browett and Jeremy Hosking, with each owning a 25% share of the company. The four successfully negotiated a takeover with the administrator Brendan Guilfoyle from the P&A Partnership and a company voluntary arrangement was formally accepted by company creditors on 20 August 2010. The consortium also purchased back Selhurst Park from Lloyds Bank after a demonstration by fans put pressure on the bank to agree terms.

In December 2015, American investors Josh Harris and David Blitzer each bought an 18% stake in the club as general partners for a total of £50 million, although the stake is now estimated to be 10%. In August 2021, another American investor John Textor bought a 40% stake worth £87.5 million, increasing to 45% in 2023. Parish remains chairman with 10% equity; Robert Franco and other investors own the remaining 9%.

In June 2025, Textor agreed to sell his stake in the club to Woody Johnson, owner of the NFL's New York Jets and former U.S. ambassador to the U.K.. Johnson signed the legal documents on 23 June in a deal reported to be worth about £190 million for Textor's stake. On 24 July, the club announced that Johnson's purchase was complete. The sale also marked the end of Eagle Football Holdings’ involvement with Crystal Palace, as the group divested its entire stake in the club through the transaction.

== Stadium ==
In 1905, the Crystal Palace Company who owned the FA Cup final venue situated inside the grounds of The Crystal Palace, wanted their own football club to play there and tap into the vast crowd potential of the area. They formed a new professional Crystal Palace F.C. to play at the stadium. When the First World War broke out, the Palace and its grounds were seized by the armed forces, and in 1915 the club were forced to leave by the Admiralty. They found a temporary base at the Herne Hill Velodrome. Although other clubs offered the use of their grounds to Palace, the club felt it best to remain as close to their natural catchment area as possible. When Croydon Common F.C. were wound up in 1917, Palace took over their old stadium located at the Nest. In 1919, they began the purchase of the land on which they eventually built Selhurst Park, their current home.

The renowned stadium architect Archibald Leitch was employed to draw up plans, and the construction of Selhurst Park was completed in time for the 1924–25 season. The stadium remained relatively unchanged, with only the introduction of floodlights and some maintenance improvements until 1969, when the Arthur Wait Stand was built. The Main Stand became all-seater in the summer of 1981 and more work followed in the next few years, when the Whitehorse Lane End was redeveloped to allow for a Sainsbury's supermarket, club offices and a club shop. The Arthur Wait Stand became all-seater in 1990, and in 1994 the Holmesdale Terrace was replaced with a new two tier stand.

Selhurst Park's record attendance was set in 1979, with an official total of 51,482. After all the redevelopments to the ground and safety requirements due to the Taylor Report, the current capacity is 25,194.

In 2011, proposals were put forward to move the club back to their original home at the Crystal Palace National Stadium, but after the club gained promotion to the Premier League in 2013, there has been a renewed focus on redeveloping Selhurst Park into a 40,000 seater stadium. Revised plans for a new 13,500-seater Main Stand (extending overall stadium capacity to 34,000) were approved at a Croydon Council meeting on 19 April 2018. However these plans were subsequently delayed, firstly due to the Covid-19 pandemic, and latterly the club's focus on delivering its Academy upgrade at Beckenham which was completed in 2021. When the club finally began to push again for the stand redevelopment, further delays occurred due to opposition to the demolition of houses in nearby Wooderson Close. The club signed a legal agreement to provide replacement homes to relocate residents. In August 2024, the expansion of the Main Stand was re-approved by Croydon Council and demolition works commenced in June 2026 with proposed completion by early 2029.

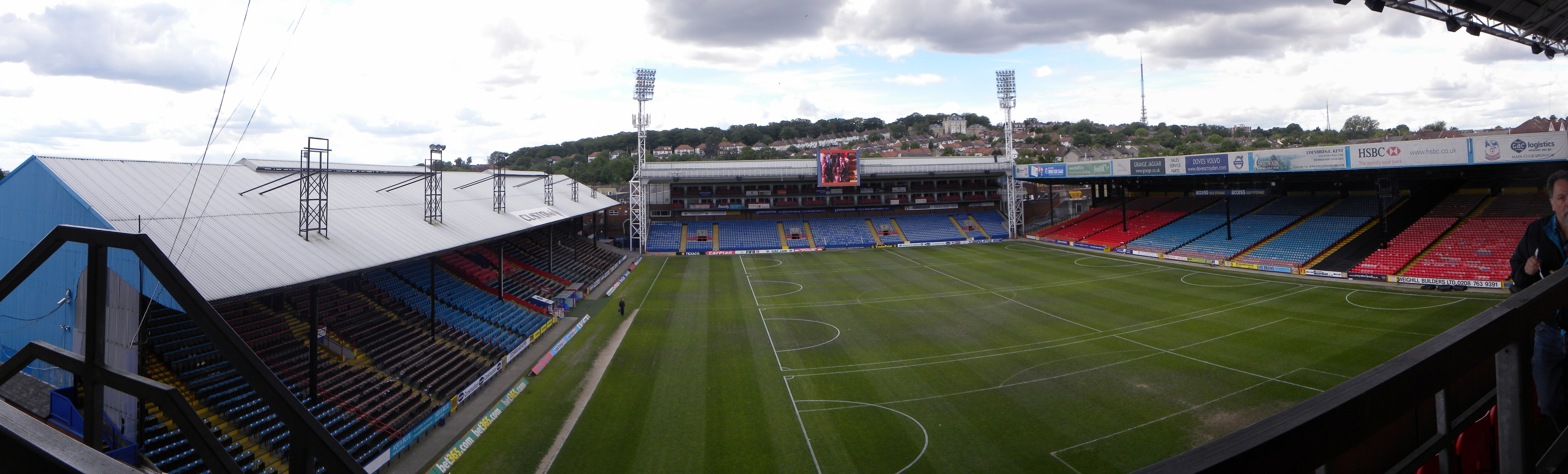
A panorama of Selhurst Park from the Upper Holmesdale, showing from left to right the Main Stand, the Whitehorse Lane End and the Arthur Wait Stand

== Colours and crest ==
The original amateur club wore blue and white hooped shirts with blue shorts, although there were variations on this, it is thought their first kit in 1861 was light blue and white halves. When the professional Crystal Palace club was created in 1905, its choice of colours were originally claret and blue shirts paired with white shorts and socks tending to be claret. This was a result of the important role in the club's formation played by Edmund Goodman, an Aston Villa employee who later became Palace manager. The club kept to this formula fairly consistently until 1938, when they decided to abandon the claret and blue and adopt white shirts and black shorts with matching socks. They returned to claret and blue from 1949 to 1954, but in 1955 the club reverted to white and black, using claret and blue trim.

There were variations on this theme until 1963, when the club adopted the away strip of yellow shirts as its home colours. In 1964, the club changed to an all-white strip modelled on Real Madrid, whom Palace had played in an historic friendly match a couple of years before. Then in 1966, they returned to claret and blue jerseys with white shorts. The club continued with variations on this theme up until Malcolm Allison's arrival as manager in 1973. Allison overhauled the club's image, adopting red and blue vertical stripes for colours and kit, inspired by Barcelona. Palace have played in variations of red and blue ever since, bar the centenary season of 2005 which saw them wear a version of their 1971–72 claret, blue and white kit.

The club was relatively late in establishing a crest. Although the initials were embroidered on the shirt from the 1935–36 season, a crest featuring the façade of The Crystal Palace did not appear until 1955. This crest disappeared from the shirt in 1964, and the team's name appeared embroidered on shirts, between 1967 and 1972. A round badge was then adopted in 1972, with the club's initials and nickname the "Glaziers" before Allison changed this too. The club's nickname became the "Eagles", inspired by Portuguese club Benfica, with the badge showing the image of an eagle holding a ball. This emblem remained until 1987, when the club married the eagle with the Crystal Palace façade, and although updated in 1996 and again in 2012, the crest retains these features. In June 2022, the club changed the foundation year on its crest from 1905 to 1861, reflecting when the original Crystal Palace Football Club was established.

=== Kit manufacturers and sponsors ===
Since 2022, Crystal Palace's kit has been manufactured by Macron. Previous manufacturers include Umbro (1975–77), Admiral (1977–80, 1987–88, 2003–04), Adidas (1980–83, 1996–99), Hummel (1984–87), Bukta (1988–93), Ribero (1992–94), Nutmeg (1994–96), TFG Sports (1999–2001), Le Coq Sportif (2001–03), Diadora (2004–07), Erreà (2007–09), Nike (2009–12), Avec (2012–14), Macron (2014–18, 2022–present), and Puma (2018–22).

The club's shirts are currently sponsored by US-based software company Temporal. Previous sponsors have been Red Rose (1983–84), Top Score (1985–86), AVR (1986–87), Andrew Copeland (1987–88), Fly Virgin (1988–91), Tulip Computers (1991–93), TDK (1993–99), Churchill Insurance (2000–06), GAC Logistics (2006–14), Neteller (2014–15), Mansion.com (2015–17), ManBetX (2017–20), W88 (2020–22), cinch (2022–24), NET88 (2024–26), and Temporal (2026–present).

The club signed its first sleeve sponsor with All Football, a Chinese-based football social media application in 2017.

In 2023, Crystal Palace and Kaiyun Sports announced their joint partnership for the company to become the club's official new sleeve sponsor.

== Club culture ==
=== Supporters ===
Crystal Palace F.C. has a fan base predominantly from the local area which draws on South London, Kent, and Surrey. Their original home at the Crystal Palace was on the boundary with Kent, while Selhurst Park was located within the borders of Surrey, until the London Government Act 1963 saw Greater London encompass Croydon.

The fans helped establish the Palace Independent Supporters' Association in 1992 to deal with supporter concerns connected with the club, while the Crystal Palace Supporters' Trust was originally established to enable fans to purchase the club during the administration of 2000. It remained in existence up to the end of 2023.

A number of fanzines have been produced by the supporters over the years. Eagle Eye was launched in 1987 and ran until 1994, with a number of contributors producing the replacement Palace Echo in 1995, which continued until 2007. The Eastern Eagles, So Glad You're Mine and One More Point were also published by fans in the 1990s. When One More Point ceased publication, Five Year Plan was launched in its place, and maintains an online presence. Supporters also engage in debate on two internet forums, The BBS and Holmesdale.net, which the club use as channels to communicate with the fans.

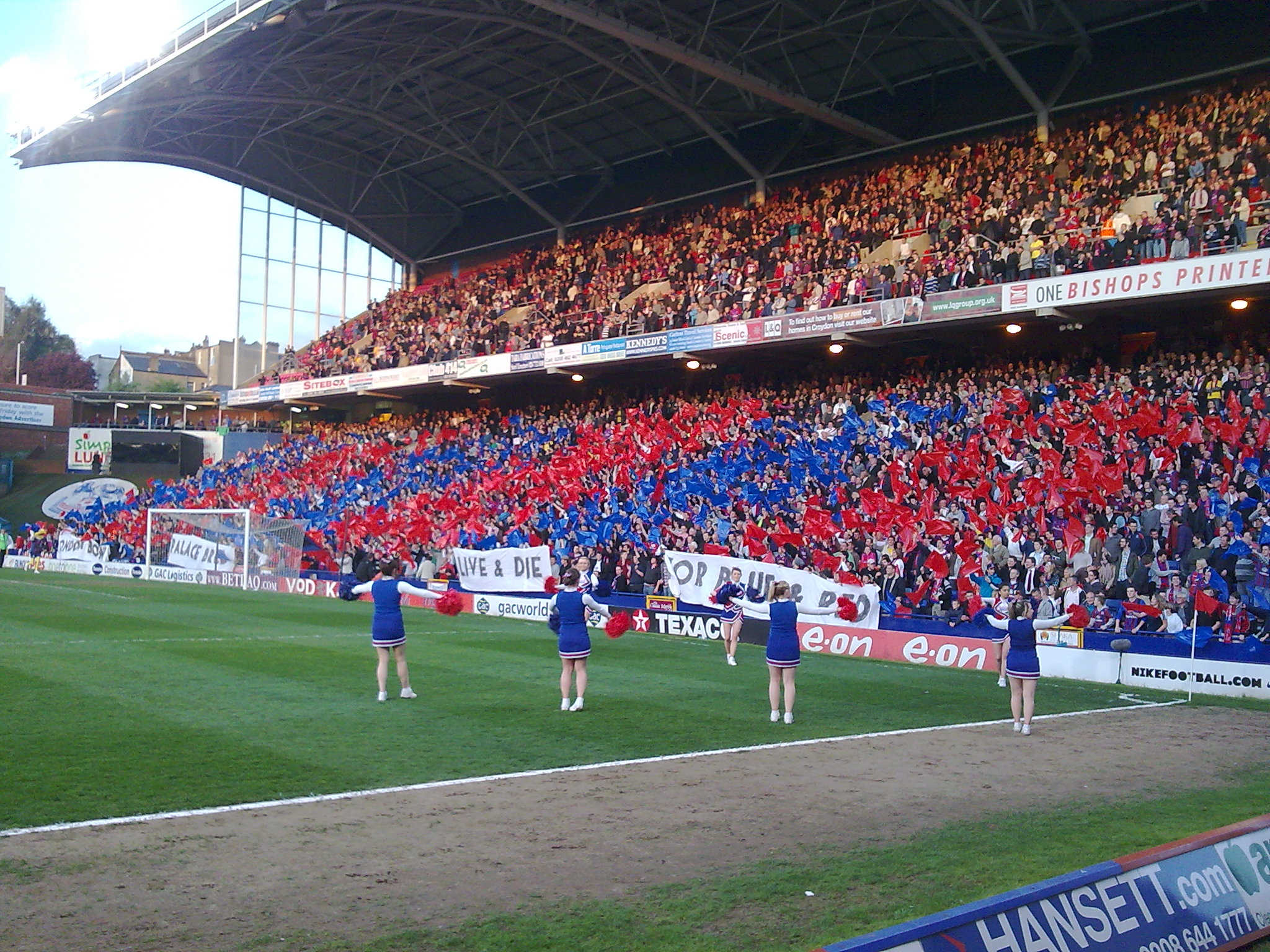
Crystal Palace fans express their support for the club after it entered administration in 2010.

Because Crystal Palace are a London club, they compete against a number of other local clubs for the attention of supporters, but it does have a recognisably large catchment area of 900,000. In 2010, the new consortium headed by Steve Parish, sought the fans' input into future decisions. A few years later, the consortium consulted them on a new badge design, and when their chosen designs were rejected, the club instead opted for a design based on a fans' idea from an internet forum.The club have strengthened their ties with the local community, and through the Crystal Palace F.C. Foundation, they work with the local London Boroughs of Croydon, Bromley and Sutton to provide sports and educational programmes which they also hope will continue to develop their supporter and geographical base. The Foundation's work was recognised by the Football League in August 2009 with their Silver Standard Community Scheme Award.

The club also enjoys a sizeable celebrity support. Kevin Day and Jo Brand host an annual comedy night for Comic Relief and the Palace Academy, and fellow comedians Eddie Izzard and Mark Steel are also staunch Palace fans. The actor Neil Morrissey developed Palace Ale, a beer on sale in the ground, while fellow actor Bill Nighy is patron of the Crystal Palace Children's Charity (CPSCC). Actors Timothy Spall and his son Rafe are avid supporters of the club. Radio DJ David Jensen is chairman of the Crystal Palace Vice Presidents Club, and acted as spokesman for the CPFC 2010 consortium during their takeover bid for the club. Actor, writer and producer John Salthouse was on the books of Palace as a player from 1968 to 1970 under the name of John Lewis, and was also a mascot for the club as a child. He incorporated the club into his role as Tony in Abigail's Party. The television presenter Susanna Reid revealed her love of Palace while taking part in Strictly Come Dancing, and visited Selhurst Park for inspiration. Bill Wyman, bass player of the Rolling Stones, is a lifelong fan. British Olympic gold medallist Alex Yee is also a supporter of the club.

=== Holmesdale Fanatics ===
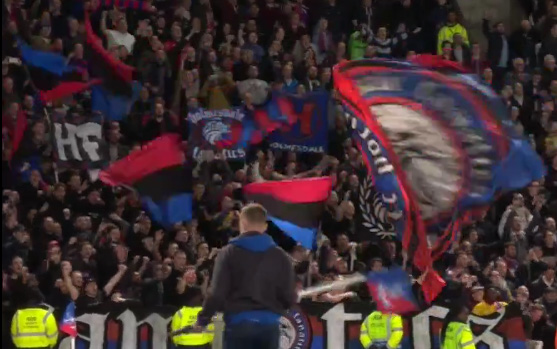
The Holmesdale Fanatics generated a passionate home atmosphere for over 20 years.

The Holmesdale Fanatics were an ultras group of Crystal Palace supporters based in the Holmesdale Road Stand at Selhurst Park. The group was active from 2005 to 2026 and organised vocal support and visual displays at home matches.

=== Rivalries ===
Due to their location in the capital, Crystal Palace are involved in a number of local derbies, mostly across South London. They enjoy rivalries with both Millwall and former tenants Charlton Athletic. The club has a long-standing and fierce rivalry with Brighton & Hove Albion which developed after Palace's relegation to the Third Division in 1974, reaching its height when they were drawn together in the first round of the 1976–77 FA Cup. The tie went to two replays, but the second replay ended in controversy after referee Ron Challis ordered a successful Brighton penalty to be retaken due to encroachment by one of their players upon the penalty area. The retake was saved, Palace won the tie 1–0 and a fierce rivalry was born.

=== In popular culture ===
The club started playing the Dave Clark Five song "Glad All Over" at home games in the early part of 1964, and the band also performed the song at Selhurst Park in 1968. It became synonymous with the club, and the Palace fans sing it at every match. The club released a cover-version of the song in the lead up to the 1990 FA Cup final.

Headmaster Keith Blackwell, who played Palace mascot "Pete the Eagle" in the nineties, fronted a series of Coca-Cola adverts in 1996, with clips of him in costume used in the commercial. Blackwell spoke about his role and the problems it caused at his school, when he would miss some PTA meetings due to Palace playing midweek matches.

In the stage and television play Abigail's Party, the character Tony mentions that he used to play professionally for Crystal Palace, but it "didn't work out", something actor John Salthouse brought to the character in rehearsals based on his own life. Salthouse also incorporated the club into the children's television series he wrote, Hero to Zero, in which the father of the main character once played for Palace reserves.

In the first series of the TV Comedy Only Fools and Horses, a Crystal Palace scarf could be seen on the coat rack, placed there by producer Ray Butt, even though its character Rodney's middle name was Charlton, as his brother Del revealed on Rodney's wedding day; their mother was a fan of "Athletic" not "Heston".

The 2008 episode of The IT Crowd, "Are We Not Men?", used Selhurst Park to film the crowd scenes. The Apple TV series Ted Lasso filmed its stadium scenes at Selhurst Park.

Crystal Palace F.C. was the subject of an Amazon Prime Video five-part series released in 2021, called When Eagles Dare, which documented the club's 2012–13 season, when they achieved promotion to the top flight via the Championship play-offs.

=== Mascots ===
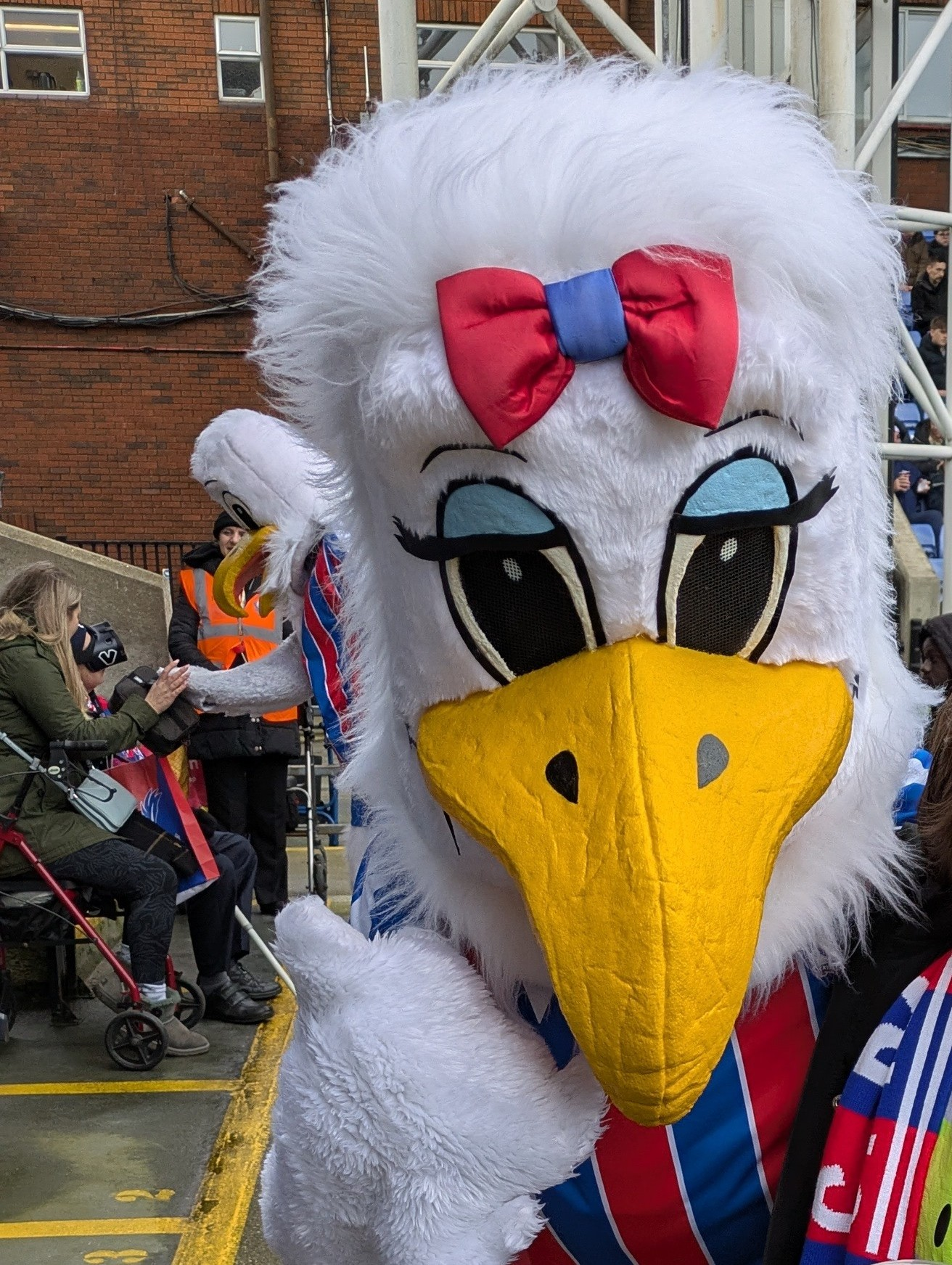
Alice the Eagle at a Crystal Palace match, with Pete the Eagle in the background

Crystal Palace have used mascots based on the club's nickname, the "Eagles", for three decades. On matchdays, a costumed mascot known as "Pete the Eagle" regularly entertains the crowds, along with a female counterpart called "Alice".

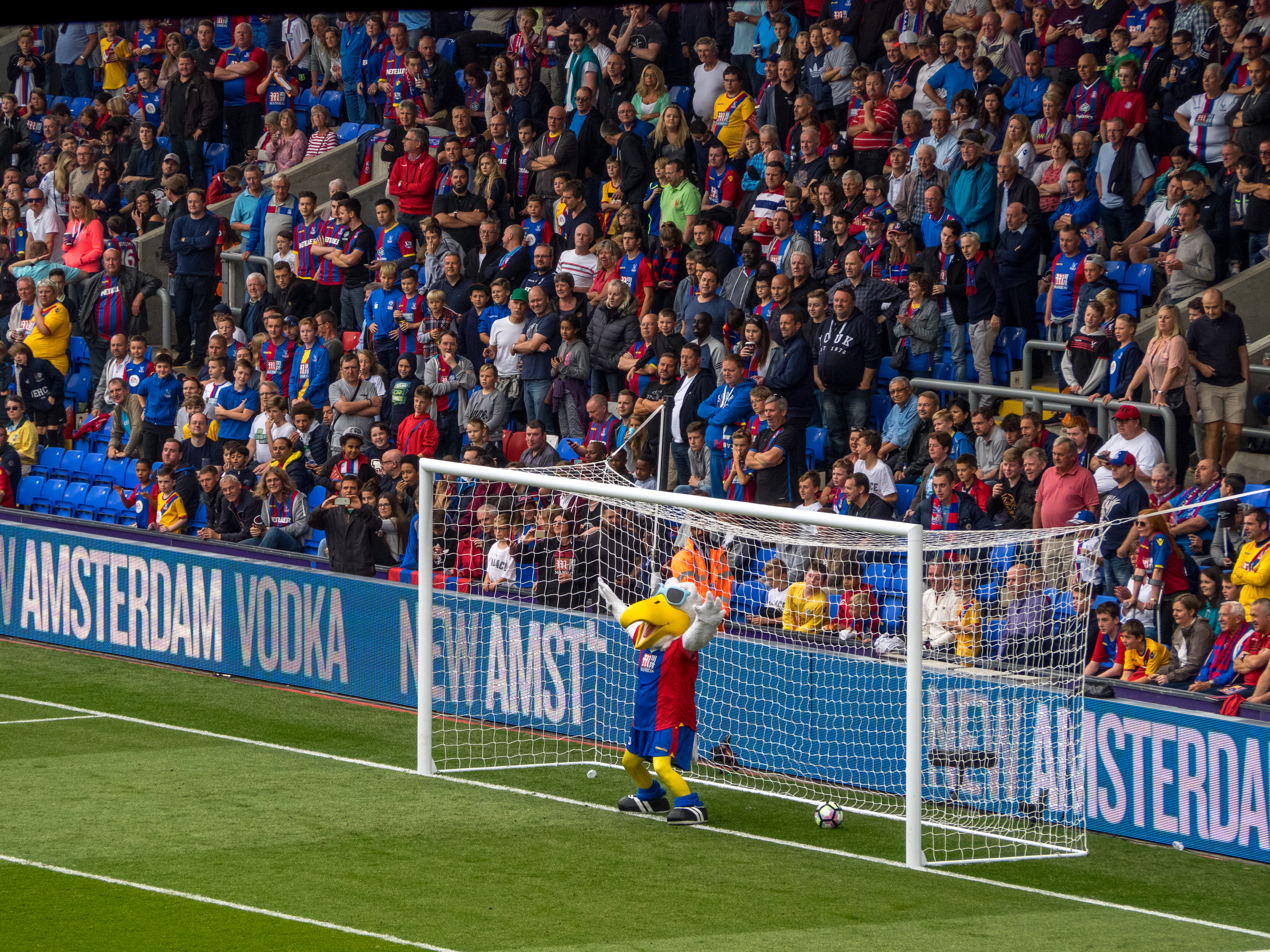
Pete the Eagle – the club's longstanding costumed mascot.

Since 2010, matchdays have also seen the appearance of a live eagle at the stadium. Until 2020, an American bald eagle, called Kayla, would fly from one end of the stadium to the other, before the start of every home game. Since 2024, a new young American bald eagle by the name of Phoenix began to take on the role. Both Kayla and Phoenix were trained and resided at Eagle Heights Wildlife Foundation in Kent. Another eagle called Challenger has represented the club on pre-season tours in the USA, along with an understudy Mr. Lincoln. Both males belong to the American Eagle Foundation of Tennessee, USA.

=== Cheerleaders ===
The club maintains a squad of cheerleaders to support the team and provide a boost to the matchday experience of the supporters. They are known as the "Crystals" or "Crystal Girls". Crystal Palace is the only club in English football that has NFL-style cheerleaders.

The squad were established in 2010 and perform before each home match and during half-time. They also perform at charity events as ambassadors for the club.

== Players ==
=== First-team squad ===
As of 4 September 2026

Note: Flags indicate national team as defined under FIFA eligibility rules; some limited exceptions apply. Players may hold more than one non-FIFA nationality.

No.	Pos.	Nation	Player
1	GK	ENG	Dean Henderson (captain)
3	DF	ENG	Tyrick Mitchell
4	DF	MAR	Chadi Riad
5	DF	FRA	Axel Disasi (on loan from Chelsea)
6	DF	FRA	Jaydee Canvot
7	FW	SEN	Ismaïla Sarr
8	MF	COL	Jefferson Lerma
9	FW	ENG	Eddie Nketiah
10	FW	ESP	Yeremy Pino
11	FW	ENG	Dwight McNeil
12	FW	USA	Zavier Gozo
14	FW	FRA	Jean-Philippe Mateta
17	DF	JPN	Takehiro Tomiyasu
18	MF	JPN	Daichi Kamada

No.	Pos.	Nation	Player
19	MF	ENG	Will Hughes
20	MF	ENG	Adam Wharton
21	DF	ITA	Honest Ahanor (on loan from Atalanta)
22	FW	NOR	Jørgen Strand Larsen
23	MF	NED	Quinten Timber
24	FW	CHI	Darío Osorio (on loan from Midtjylland)
25	DF	ISR	Anan Khalaili
26	DF	USA	Chris Richards
28	MF	MLI	Cheick Doucouré
29	FW	CIV	Evann Guessand (on loan from Aston Villa)
30	DF	ESP	Óscar Mingueza
31	GK	ENG	Remi Matthews
33	DF	ENG	Ben Chilwell
44	GK	ARG	Walter Benítez

=== Out on loan ===
The loans listed here are for players who are normally part of the first team squad or under-21 players who have made a competitive appearance for the first team or have been called into the first team squad for a competitive fixture.

Note: Flags indicate national team as defined under FIFA eligibility rules; some limited exceptions apply. Players may hold more than one non-FIFA nationality.

No.	Pos.	Nation	Player
—	GK	CAN	Owen Goodman (at Dundee until end of 2026–27 season)
—	DF	CRO	Borna Sosa (at 1. FC Köln until end of 2026–27 season)
—	DF	TTO	Rio Cardines (at Bristol City until end of 2026–27 season)

No.	Pos.	Nation	Player
—	MF	BRA	Matheus França (at Alverca until end of 2026–27 season)
—	FW	ENG	Romain Esse (at Millwall until end of 2026–27 season)
—	FW	GHA	Jesurun Rak-Sakyi (at Kasımpaşa until end of 2026–27 season)

== Notable former players ==
Players with over 100 appearances for Crystal Palace can be found here
All past (and present) players who are the subjects of Wikipedia articles can be found here

=== Crystal Palace "Centenary XI" ===
To celebrate the club's centenary in 2005, Crystal Palace fans were asked to vote for a "Centenary XI" from a shortlist of ten players per position provided by the club.

- (England) Nigel Martyn (1989–96)
- (England) Paul Hinshelwood (1974–83)
- (Wales) Chris Coleman (1991–95)
- (Scotland) Jim Cannon (1972–88)
- (England) Kenny Sansom (1975–80)
- (England) John Salako (1986–95)
- (England) Geoff Thomas (1987–93)
- (England) Andy Gray (1984–87, 1989–92)
- (Italy) Attilio Lombardo (1997–99)
- (England) Andrew Johnson (2002–06, 2014)
- (England) Ian Wright (1985–91)

== Coaching staff ==
Position	Name
Director of Football	(England) Matt Hobbs
Manager	(Denmark) Thomas Frank
Assistant manager	(Republic of Ireland) Paddy McCarthy
First-team coaches	(Antigua and Barbuda) Justin Cochrane (Mexico) Bernardo Cueva
Goalkeeping coach	(England) Andy Quy
Fitness coach	(England) Chris Haslam
Academy director	(England) Gary Issott
Under-21s manager	(England) Darren Powell

== Managers ==
Statistics are complete up to and including the match played 21 November 2026. Not including caretaker managers. All competitive matches are counted.

Edmund Goodman, the club's longest-serving manager, was in charge from 1907 until 1925.

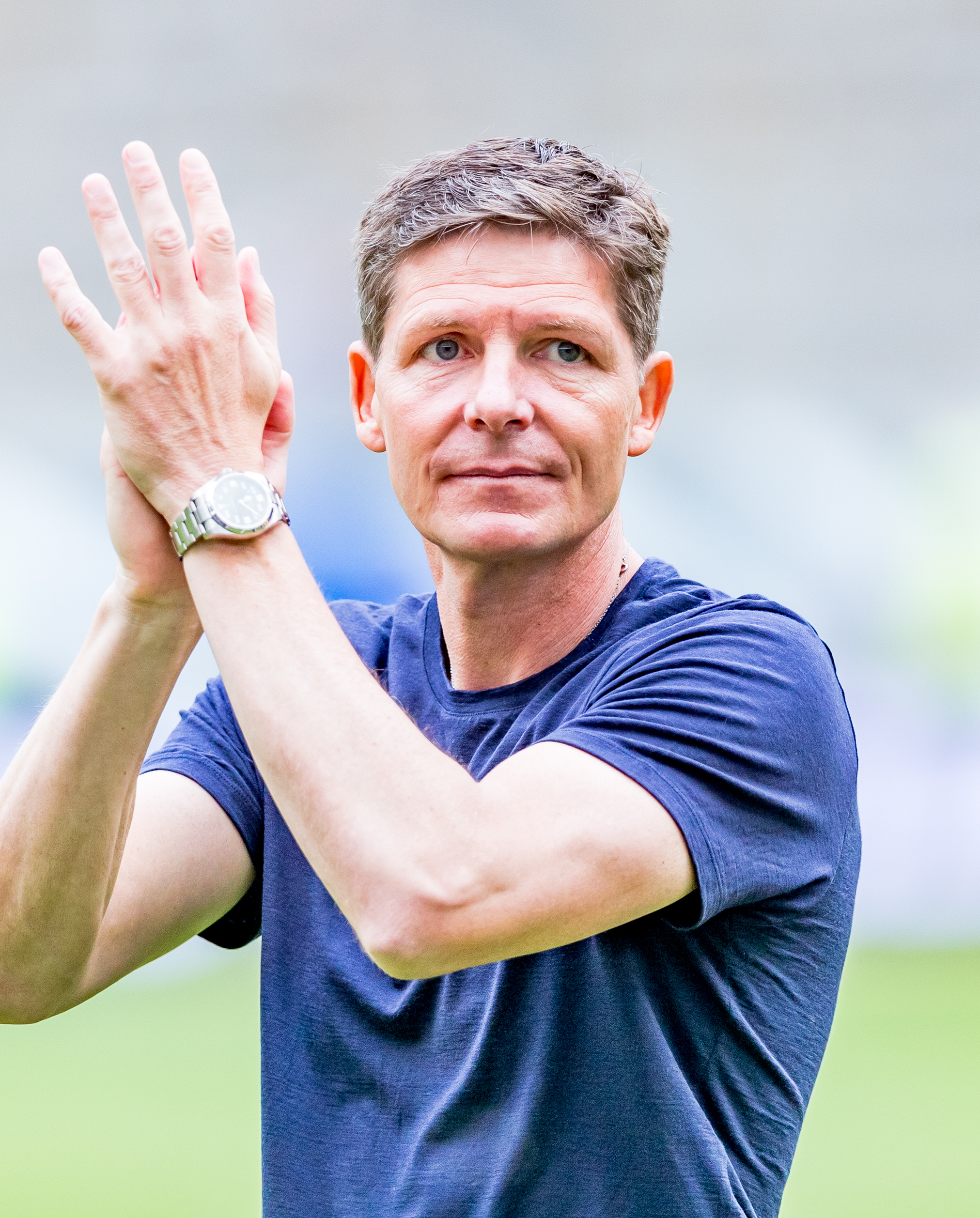
Oliver Glasner, Palace's most successful manager, won the 2024–25 FA Cup, the 2025 FA Community Shield and the 2025–26 UEFA Conference League.

Manager	From	To	Pld	W	D	L	W%
Jack Robson	July 1905	30 April 1907	77	35	18	24	45.45
Edmund Goodman	1 May 1907	24 November 1925	613	242	166	205	39.48
Alex Maley	24 November 1925	12 October 1927	83	36	16	31	43.37
Fred Mavin	21 November 1927	18 October 1930	132	63	33	36	47.73
Jack Tresadern	27 October 1930	June 1935	213	98	44	71	46.01
Tom Bromilow	July 1935; 1 January 1937	July 1936; July 1939	162	71	40	51	43.83
R. S. Moyes	July 1936	8 December 1936	23	6	6	11	26.09
George Irwin	July 1939	July 1947	45	15	11	19	33.33
Jack Butler	July 1947	June 1949	88	23	24	41	26.14
Ronnie Rooke	June 1949	29 November 1950	62	19	15	28	30.65
Fred Dawes/Charlie Slade	29 November 1950	11 October 1951	40	8	10	22	20.00
Laurie Scott	11 October 1951	October 1954	145	43	41	61	29.66
Cyril Spiers	October 1954	June 1958	181	52	53	76	28.73
George Smith	July 1958	12 April 1960	100	42	27	31	42.00
Arthur Rowe	15 April 1960	30 November 1962	132	52	32	48	39.39
Dick Graham	30 November 1962	3 January 1966	150	68	41	41	45.33
Bert Head	18 April 1966	30 March 1973	328	101	96	131	30.79
Malcolm Allison	30 March 1973; 1 December 1980	May 1976; 26 January 1981	155	53	48	54	34.19
Terry Venables	1 June 1976; 9 June 1998	14 October 1980; 15 January 1999	220	80	76	64	36.36
Dario Gradi	26 January 1981	10 November 1981	30	7	3	20	23.33
Steve Kember	10 November 1981; 18 April 2003	June 1982; 3 November 2003	53	15	14	24	28.30
Alan Mullery	July 1982	June 1984	98	31	27	40	31.63
Steve Coppell	July 1984; July 1995; 28 February 1997; 15 January 1999	21 May 1993; 8 February 1996; 13 March 1998; 1 August 2000	565	221	146	198	39.12
Alan Smith	3 June 1993; 1 August 2000	15 May 1995; 29 April 2001	163	62	43	58	38.04
Dave Bassett	8 February 1996	27 February 1997	60	29	15	16	48.33
Attilio Lombardo (Note: Player-manager)	13 March 1998	29 April 1998	7	2	0	5	28.57
Steve Bruce	30 May 2001	31 October 2001	18	11	2	5	61.11
Trevor Francis	30 November 2001	18 April 2003	78	28	22	28	35.90
Iain Dowie	22 December 2003	22 May 2006	123	50	29	44	40.65
Peter Taylor	13 June 2006	8 October 2007	60	21	16	23	35.00
Neil Warnock	11 October 2007; 27 August 2014	2 March 2010; 27 December 2014	146	50	45	51	34.25
Paul Hart	2 March 2010	3 May 2010	14	3	6	5	21.43
George Burley	17 June 2010	1 January 2011	25	7	5	13	28.00
Dougie Freedman	11 January 2011	23 October 2012	90	32	27	31	35.56
Ian Holloway	3 November 2012	23 October 2013	46	14	14	18	30.43
Tony Pulis	23 November 2013	14 August 2014	28	12	5	11	42.86
Alan Pardew	2 January 2015	22 December 2016	87	35	13	39	40.23
Sam Allardyce	23 December 2016	23 May 2017	24	9	3	12	37.50
Frank de Boer	26 June 2017	11 September 2017	5	1	0	4	20.00
Roy Hodgson	12 September 2017; 21 March 2023	23 May 2021; 19 February 2024	200	66	47	87	33.00
Patrick Vieira	4 July 2021	17 March 2023	74	22	25	27	29.73
Oliver Glasner	19 February 2024	27 May 2026	121	51	36	34	42.15
Pierre Sage	15 June 2026	12 November 2026	16	5	3	8	31.25
Thomas Frank	16 November 2026	present	1	0	0	1	0.00

== Honours ==
=== Domestic ===
League

- Second Division / First Division / Championship (level 2)
  - Champions: 1978–79, 1993–94
  - Runners-up: 1968–69
  - Play-off winners: 1989, 1997, 2004, 2013
- Third Division / Third Division South (level 3)
  - Champions: 1920–21
  - Runners-up: 1928–29, 1930–31, 1938–39, 1963–64
- Fourth Division (level 4)
  - Runners-up: 1960–61

Cup

- FA Cup
  - Winners: 2024–25
  - Runners-up: 1989–90, 2015–16
- FA Community Shield
  - Winners: 2025
- Full Members' Cup (Note: This was a cup competition held from 1985 to 1992. It was also known under its sponsored names of the Simod Cup from 1987 to 1989 and the Zenith Data Systems Cup from 1989 to 1992. It was created after the Heysel Stadium disaster, when English clubs were banned from European competition, as an additional competition for clubs in the top two divisions.)
  - Winners: 1990–91

=== European ===
- UEFA Conference League
  - Winners: 2025–26

=== Regional ===
- Football League South
  - Champions: 1940–41
- South D League
  - Champions: 1939–40
- Southern Football League Division One
  - Runners-up: 1913–14
- Southern Football League Division Two
  - Champions: 1905–06
- United League
  - Champions: 1906–07
  - Runners-up: 1905–06
- Southern Professional Floodlit Cup
  - Runners-up: 1958–59
- London Challenge Cup (Note: This was a tournament organised by the London FA. It was first contested in 1908, and other than during the World Wars, was contested every season until 1974, when the tournament was disbanded.)
  - Winners: 1912–13, 1913–14, 1920–21
  - Runners-up: 1919–20, 1921–22, 1922–23, 1931–32, 1937–38, 1946–47
- Surrey Senior Cup
  - Winners: 1996–97, 2000–01, 2001–02
- Kent Senior Shield
  - Winners: 1911–12
  - Runners-up: 1912–13

== Statistics and records ==
Jim Cannon holds the record for the most Crystal Palace appearances in all competitions, having played 660 first-team matches between 1973 and 1988. He also holds the record for the most league appearances, making 571. Peter Simpson holds the record for the most goals scored in a season, 54 in the 1930–31 season in Division Three (South) and is also the top scorer over a career – 165 goals between 1929 and 1935. Wayne Hennessey holds the club record for most international caps.

Chart showing Crystal Palace's table positions since joining the Football League.

Crystal Palace were inaugural champions of the newly formed Third Division in 1920–21, which was also their first season in the Football League and therefore became one of only a small group of clubs to have achieved the feat of winning a Football League Division at the first time of asking. Their average league attendance of 19,092 in the 1960–61 season and the attendance of 37,774 for the Good Friday game at Selhurst Park between Palace and Millwall the same season are Fourth Division attendance records. Palace's official record home attendance is 51,482 for a Second Division match against Burnley on 11 May 1979. The club's biggest victory margin in the league was the 9–0 home win against Barrow in the Fourth Division in 1959, while their heaviest defeat in the league was by the same scoreline away to Liverpool in the First Division in 1989.

The highest transfer fee received for a Crystal Palace player is £67.5 million from Arsenal for Eberechi Eze in August 2025, while the highest transfer fee paid by the club to date is £48 million for Jørgen Strand Larsen from Wolverhampton Wanderers in February 2026.

The club's highest ever league finish so far is third place in the old Football League First Division, now called the Premier League, achieved in the 1990–91 season. Palace hold the record for the most points for a relegated Premier League club with 49 (although that was in a 42-game season in 1992–93). They are also the only club ever to be relegated from the Premier League when finishing fourth from bottom, after it had been decided that the bottom four clubs at the end of the 1994–95 season would be relegated, in order to accommodate the league being reduced from 22 to 20 clubs for the 1995–96 season; Palace's points total that season of 45 is also the second-highest points total in Premier League history for a relegated club. Palace hold the record for the most play-off final wins (4) resulting in promotion to the top-flight. Each of these play-off final wins occurred at a different location: Selhurst Park in 1989 (the first leg of the two-legged final was played at Ewood Park in Blackburn), old Wembley Stadium in 1997, Millennium Stadium in Cardiff in 2004 and new Wembley in 2013.

== Crystal Palace in Europe ==
Crystal Palace have competed three times in UEFA competitions during their history; the 1998 UEFA Intertoto Cup, the 2025–26 UEFA Conference League, where they won their first European trophy after defeating Spanish club Rayo Vallecano 1–0 in the final, and the 2026–27 UEFA Europa League. The club also competed in a minor European competition known as the Anglo-Italian Cup during the 1970s.

== Women's team ==
Crystal Palace Women is a women's football club founded in 1992, which is affiliated to the men's equivalent. They currently compete in the Women's Super League and play their home games at the VBS Community Stadium in Sutton, South London.

== See also ==
- Football in London
