= George Irvine =

George Irvine may refer to:

- George Irvine (politician) (1826–1897), Canadian politician
- George Irvine (basketball) (1948–2017), American basketball player and coach
- George Irvine (diver), see William Hogarth Main

== See also ==
- George Irving (disambiguation)
- George Irwin (disambiguation)
