= R. S. Moyes =

English football manager and director

Managerial career
- Years: Team
- 1936: Crystal Palace

R S Moyes (dates of birth and death unknown) was a director of Crystal Palace F.C. who served also as manager, in 1936.

Moyes' term as manager came about when Tom Bromilow resigned after the 1935–36 season, following a disagreement with the board over transfer dealings. Moyes was appointed as manager on a full-time basis rather than as caretaker. His time as manager was not successful and he resigned in early December after 17 League games (W5, D4, L8) and 23 in total (W6, D6, L11). His period in charge was also controversial in respect of the transfers of Vincent Blore and Jack Palethorpe over which Moyes found himself in disagreement with the board. After resigning as manager, Moyes reverted to a scouting role but in 1939, was suspended for 12 months by the FA after irregularities were discovered relating to Blore and Palethorpe.

Sporting positions
Preceded by Tom Bromilow	Crystal Palace manager 1936	Succeeded by Tom Bromilow
