= George Vere Irving =

Scottish lawyer and antiquary

George Vere Irving (1816–1869) was a Scottish lawyer and antiquary.

== Life ==
George Vere Irving was born on 9 October 1816 and was the only son of Alexander Irving of Newton, Lanarkshire, who became a Scottish judge with the title of Lord Newton. In 1837, he was called to the Scottish bar.

Irving took part in the volunteer movement, and became captain of the Carnwath troop. He died at 5 St. Mark's Crescent, Regent's Park, London, on 29 October 1869, aged 53.

== Works ==
Irving's works were:

- Digest of the Law of the Assessed Taxes in Scotland, Edinburgh, 1841.
- Digest of the Inhabited House Tax Act, London, 1852.
- The Upper Ward of Lanarkshire described and delineated. The Archæological and Historical Section by G. V. Irving. The Statistical and Topographical Section by Alexander Murray, 3 vols. Glasgow, 1864.

Irving was a Fellow of the Society of Antiquaries of Scotland and vice-president of the British Archæological Association. He also contributed frequently to Notes and Queries.

== Notes ==
Attribution

This article incorporates text from a publication now in the public domain: Lee, Sidney, ed. (1892). "Irving, George Vere". Dictionary of National Biography. Vol. 29. London: Smith, Elder & Co.
