= Mark Goldberg (football manager) =

English football manager and club chairman

Personal information
- Place of birth: England

Senior career*
Years	Team	Apps	(Gls)
- Bromley
- Beckenham Town

Managerial career
- Beckenham Town
- 2006–2007: Bromley
- 2008–2011: Bromley
- 2011–2016: Bromley
- 2016: Welling United
- * Club domestic league appearances and goals

Mark Goldberg is an English entrepreneur and football club chairman and manager.

== Business ==
Mark Goldberg started out in the recruitment industry in 1984. Between 1992 and 1998 he built one of the UK's fastest growing IT contracting companies which doubled its turnover for five consecutive years resulting in a public flotation in 1996 at a market value capitalization of £36m as MSB INTERNATIONAL PLC. Goldberg sold a majority of his shareholding in 1998 at market cap of £200m. With this money and a further credit from the previous owner Ron Noades he bought in 1998 the Premier League club Crystal Palace - Goldberg's plans for the club to go onto the London Stock Market did not materialise and due to lack of financial assistance he was declared bankrupt in 2000.

== Football ==
=== Playing career ===
As a player, Goldberg played for non-League clubs Bromley and Beckenham Town, where he was player-manager while still in his 20s.

He also played football for two seasons in the United States, from 1982 to 1983, at the College of William and Mary, after being recruited by its head coach, Al Albert.

=== Crystal Palace ===
Goldberg became owner and chairman of Crystal Palace Football Club in June 1998. Goldberg was unable to raise sufficient funds to achieve his plan for the club, ultimately resulting in the club being forced into administration and leading to his personal bankruptcy.

Goldberg had purchased the club from long-serving chairman Ron Noades, but Palace ended up relegated from the FA Premier League that season – for the third time in six years. The takeover deal also saw Italian Serie A side Juventus have a 10% stake in Palace, with a view to Juventus players being loaned or sold to the club. Goldberg also set a target into turning Palace into a leading European club by 2003.

At the end of the 1997–98 season, Goldberg appointed Terry Venables as head coach for the following season and former manager Steve Coppell became Director of football. The club was not successful under his chairmanship and in January 1999 it was taken over by administrators who counted £22 million of debts, including £2m owed to Terry Venables and £7m to banks, the remainder to football clubs, players and HMRC. The club also failed to reach the standards set when Goldberg took over, with their financial crisis not being solved until a takeover by Simon Jordan was completed more than a year later, and a return to the Premier League was not achieved until 2004.

=== Bromley ===
Goldberg was player manager for a short period in 1988. He re-joined Bromley FC as first team manager in 2005, Appointed by his brother-in-law and Bromley chairman, Jerry Dolke, Goldberg replaced incumbent manager George Wakeling and his management team.

Goldberg's start in management was successful, leading Bromley to promotion into the Conference South division via the play-offs. His first pre-season included a tie against the youth team of Crystal Palace and his competitive start was good, with Bromley topping the Premier Division after his first eleven games and reaching the first round of the FA Cup before losing 4–1 to League One side Gillingham.

Goldberg left Bromley during the 2007–08 season, to be succeeded by Simon Osborn, but returned to the club at the end of the season. In April 2009, Goldberg suffered serious damage to his knee ligament while playing for Bromley Veterans in an Isthmian Veterans Cup semi-final.

Goldberg guided the club to promotion from the Ryman Premier Division during his first season after winning the Play Off Final against Billericay FC.

During his term, Goldberg guided the club to win 3 trophies amongst the Kent and London Senior Cup competitions as well as leading the club to reach the FA Cup first round, during 5 out of his 8 seasons as manager.

Goldberg agreed to step down as manager on 4 February 2016.

=== Welling United ===
Goldberg became manager of Welling United in April 2016. He left the position in November 2016.

== Personal life ==
Goldberg's son, Bradley, was a semi-professional footballer.

== Honours ==
=== Club ===
Bromley

- Conference South: 2014–15
- Isthmian League playoff winners: 2006–07
- Kent Senior Cup (2): 2005–06, 2006–07
- London Senior Cup: 2012–13
