= Arthur Wait =

- Born: Аrthur John Wait; 5 April 1910; Croydon, Surrey, England
- Died: 27 June 1981 (aged 71); Sutton, London, England
- Occupations: Builder and football club executive
- Years active: Circa 1930–1981
- Known for: Construction industry Chairman and Life President of Crystal Palace F.C.
- Notable work: Arthur Wait stand at Selhurst Park, London SE25

Arthur John Wait (5 April 1910 — 27 June 1981) was an English builder and life president and former chairman of Crystal Palace F.C..

Wait was a local builder who joined the board of Crystal Palace F.C. as a director sometime between 1948 and 1950. In 1958 he became the Chairman, before being replaced by Raymond Bloye in 1972, and he then became Life President of the club, a position he held until his death in 1981. The Arthur Wait Stand at Selhurst Park is named in his honour. Wait was a lifelong Palace supporter who used to sneak into the ground as a schoolboy.

During his time as chairman he oversaw a successful period for the club, gaining promotion to the First Division in 1969 and he also helped the club achieve distinction when he invited Real Madrid over to play their first ever game in London to celebrate the installation of the new floodlights at Selhurst Park. Wait and the board initially wanted to invite a famous club from the north of England, but after discovering the fee demanded, Wait declared: "If that's what they are going to do to us, we might as well try to get Real Madrid." Wait secured the services of the Spanish giants for a fee of £10,000 and expenses. On the evening of 18 April 1962, the Spanish Ambassador switched on the floodlights and Madrid secured a first half lead of 3–1 and then held on to win 4–3.
