= George Macaulay Irwin =

Businessman and arts advocate

George Macaulay Irwin

George Macaulay Irwin (May 2, 1921 – November 24, 2020) was an American expert in the arts and a businessman, editor, musician and conductor. Irwin is known for his work with arts organizations on the local, state, and national levels, as well as his efforts in preserving historic architecture. He was also the founder of America's first arts council, the Quincy Society of Fine Arts, the founder and first chairman of the Illinois Arts Council, founder and first president of the Americans for the Arts (formerly American Council for the Arts), and worked as a consultant on the committee that established the National Endowment for the Arts.

== Early life ==
Irwin was born and raised in Quincy, Illinois and graduated from Quincy Public Schools in 1939.

Irwin then attended the University of Michigan and graduated in 1943.

== Career ==
Upon college graduation, Irwin moved back to Quincy, Illinois and worked at Irwin Paper Company from 1943 to 1969. He was the Personnel Director of the company from 1950 to 1969. In 1947, Irwin became the editor of Adventure in Enterprise, a biography of Leaton Irwin, the man who founded Irwin Paper Co. in 1887. Irwin served as a chairman on the board of directors at Irwin Paper Company, the Peoria Paper House, Inc. and the Decatur Paper House Inc. from 1961 to 1969.

From 1961 to 1971, Irwin served as a chairman on the board of directors for Quincy Compressor Company, a division of Colt Industries.

Irwin was the collector of 20th century art by American artists, and starting in 1950, he commissioned works from American composers, painters, and sculptors for his collection.

Irwin is credited with placing several Quincy landmarks on the National Register of Historic Places, some of which he personally saved from planned destruction and then restored.

== Personal life ==
He resided in his hometown of Quincy, Illinois until his death at Blessing Hospital on November 24, 2020. His obituary was published on November 24, 2020, by the Quincy Herald-Whig.

== Local activities ==
Year	Organization	Role	Notes
1946–1964	Quincy Chamber Music Ensemble	Founder and Music Director	
1946–1964	Quincy Choral Society	Founder and Conductor	
1947–1977	Quincy Society of Fine Arts	Founder and First President	
1947–1955	Quincy Civic Band	Founder and co-conductor	
1947–1964, 1964–1967	Quincy Symphony Orchestra	Founder and Conductor, Advisor	
1948–1955	Sunday Music Club	President	Formed to replace Civic Music Association Musicales
1948	Quincy Public Library	Organized Record Lending Library	
1949	Quincy Community Little Theatre	Committee chairman	Committee formed to re-organize the organization
1951–1965, 1980–1990	Historical Society of Quincy and Adams County	President, Member of Restoration Committee	
1951–1971, 1989–1990	Quincy Art Club	board member and Vice President, Member Building and Exhibits Committees, Curator for Exhibit Opening New Building	
1960s	Sheridan Swim Club	One of Three Founders/Developers	
1961–2020	Quincy Foundation	President	
1966–1981	Culver-Stockton College	Board of Trustees	Canton, Missouri
1975	Quincy Conservatory of Music	Headed the Re-Organization and Re-Structuring	
1982–1990	Gardner Museum of Architecture and Design	board member, vice-president, Exhibits chairman and Fund Raiser	Founded to purchase and occupy the old Free Public Library
1984–1990	Quincy Preservation Commission	Member	
1990, 1990–2005, 1994–2005	Friends of the Dr. Richard Eells House	Founder, "Volunteer CEO" board member and Treasurer, President	1835 Underground Railroad Site
1996	Historic Quincy Architecture	Chairman of Steering Committee and producer	A book of color photographs and text of 1830s to 1930s Quincy buildings

Irwin was a former scoutmaster for Troop 8, former board member and president of Woodland Home, and a former board member, president, and chairman of the United Fund. He was also a former board member for the following organizations: Quincy Civic Music Association, Quincy Community Little Theatre, Blessing Hospital, Quincy Area Project, and the Congregational Church.

== State activities ==
Year	Organization	Role
1963–1971	Illinois Arts Council	Organizer and First chairman
1967–1974	Museum of Contemporary Art Chicago	Board of Trustees
1967–1974	Ravinia Festival Association, Highland Park	Board of Trustees
1969–1973	Illinois Historic Sites Advisory Council	Member
1970–1974, 1985–1999	Illinois State Museum, Springfield	board of directors
1973–1976	University of Chicago	Visiting Committee on Music
1977–1981	Free Street Theater, Chicago	board of directors
1982–1990	Hubbard Street Dance Company, Chicago	Advisory Board
1990s	The Art Institute of Chicago	Governing Life Member
1990s	The Orchestral Association, Chicago	Governing Member
1990s	Union League Club of Chicago	Member

== National activities ==
Year	Organization	Role	Location
1952–1967	American Symphony Orchestra League	board member and Officer	Washington D.C.
1961–1973	American Council for the Arts (now Americans for the Arts)	A Founder, First President, and chairman	New York
1966–1972	Council on Foundations, Inc.	board of directors and Executive Committee	New York
1967	Music Educators National Conference	Panelist	Tanglewood
1968–1971	Business Committee for the Arts	Founding board member	New York
1970–1974	American Revolution Bicentennial Commission	board member	Washington D.C.
1970–1975	American Federation of Arts	board member, Member of American Delegation to First UNESCO Inter-Governmental Conference on Institutional and Financial Aspects of Cultural Policies in Venice, Italy (1973–1975), Ditchely Conference on Government Cultural Policies in England (1974)	New York
1975–1977	Interlochen Center for the Arts	Alumni Advisory Board	Michigan
1975–1980	National Endowment for the Arts	Consultant and Panelist	
1987	Peace Corps	Arts Consultant	Washington D.C.

== Architectural work ==
George M. Irwin was active in Architecture and Historic Preservation projects in Quincy, Illinois for over a half-century.

Buildings restored by Irwin

- Charles Henry Bull House (1856) (Spent 35 years restoring the two acres of house and grounds)
- Loan and Trust Company (Patton & Fisher, Architects, 1892)
- Ernest Wood Office and Studio (Ernest Wood, architect, 1912)
- Free Public Library (Patton & Fisher, 1888) (Lead the public effort to defeat a bond issue and helped the library find another downtown location)
- William S. Warfield House (Joseph Lyman Silsbee, 1886) (Acquired this property through the Quincy Foundation, it rested on a nationally important intersection, supervised its extensive restoration, prevented it from being cut up into modest duplex houses)

Buildings Irwin assisted with the restoration of

- Richard Newcomb House (Harvey Chatten 1890)
- Dr. Richard Eells House (Had a major effect on the acquisition and restoration of this nationally recognized Underground Railroad site in Quincy)

Surveys, studies, tours, and literature organized by Irwin

- 1976: Organized Quincy's first Historic House Tour which resulted in the organization of the private group Quincy Preserves the next year (Through the Quincy Society of Fine Arts)
- 1996: Developed the plan and led the effort to raise $130,000 to produce Historic Quincy Architecture, a 128-page book of color photographs of Quincy's most important houses and commercial and public buildings from the 1830s to the 1930s. Sale of the 6,500 has benefited nine Quincy cultural groups (Suggested by Houston architectural photographer Richard Payne)

== Awards and honors ==
- 1963 Solano Medal of Honor (Quincy College)
- 1973 Honorary Doctor of Fine Arts (Culver-Stockton College, Canton, MO)
- 1978 Governor's Arts Award (Illinois Arts Council)
- 1978 Commendation for 30 years of community service, 80th General Assembly Resolution No.1079 (State of Illinois House of Representatives)
- 1981 Distinguished Service Award (Southern Illinois University, Edwardsville)
- 1981 First City of Quincy Arts Award (Quincy Society of Fine Arts)
- 1983 Preservation Honor Award (National Trust for Historic Preservation)
- 1990 Honorary Doctor of Humane Letters (Western Illinois University, Macomb)
- 1990 Lifetime Achievement Award (Illinois Arts Alliance Foundation, Chicago)
- 1996 Distinguished Service Award for Support of the Arts, presented at July conference in Puerto Rico (National Governors Association)
- 1999 Richard Driehaus Foundation Award for lifetime work in historic preservation (Landmarks Preservation Council of Illinois)
- 1999 Studs Terkel Award for Lifetime Service to the Arts and Humanities (Illinois Humanities Council)
- Award for organizing the Illinois Arts Council (1965), and serving as First chairman through 1971 (Illinois Arts Council)
- 2000 Governor's Proclamation: "George M. Irwin Day in Illinois" April 28, 2000 (State of Illinois)
- 2000 Mayor's Proclamation: "George M. Irwin Day in Quincy" April 28, 2000 (City of Quincy)
- 2000 Honorary Doctor of Humane Letters (Quincy University)
- 2003 BRAVO Award (Muddy River Opera Company, Quincy)
- 2006 Historic Quincy Business District Award for Excellence in Downtown Revitalization, Preservation Pioneer Award
- 2007 Recognition as Founder and First President at 60th Anniversary Reception in November (Quincy Society of Fine Arts)
- 2008 Dedication of April 2008 concert in 60th anniversary Season to Founder and First Conductor (Quincy Symphony Orchestra)
- 2008 Selina Roberts Ottum Award for 60 years of service to the Arts and Community Development in Philadelphia during June 2008 (Americans for the Arts, co-sponsored by the National Endowment for the Arts)
- 2014 Dedication of original composition by Thom Ritter George "Song of the Harp" on April 12, 2014 (Quincy Symphony Orchestra)
