= George Irwin (football manager) =

English footballer and manager

Personal information
- Date of birth: 7 January 1891
- Place of birth: Smethwick, England
- Position: Goalkeeper

Senior career*
Years	Team	Apps	(Gls)
?–1921	West Bromwich Albion	0	(0)
1921–1923	Crystal Palace	16	(0)
1923–1926	Reading	?	(?)

Managerial career
- 1939–1947: Crystal Palace
- 1950–1952: Darlington
- * Club domestic league appearances and goals

George Irwin (born 7 January 1891) was manager of the English football clubs Crystal Palace (1939–47) and Darlington (1950–52). He also made appearances in the Football League for Crystal Palace and Reading.

== Playing career ==
Irwin began his career at West Bromwich Albion, but did not make a first team appearance for the club. He signed for Crystal Palace in 1921, as understudy to Jack Alderson. After two seasons he moved on to Reading where he spent a further three seasons before retiring as a player.

== Coaching career ==
Irwin then moved into coaching, initially with Southend United, before moving to Sheffield Wednesday where he also served as assistant manager, and was on the staff when Wednesday won the 1935 FA Cup Final. Irwin returned to Crystal Palace, as coach, in 1937 before being appointed manager in 1939. He remained with Palace during the years of wartime football winning regional league titles in 1940, 1941 and 1946. However the first post-war season (1946–7) resulted in a disappointing eighteenth place in the Third Division South and Irwin resigned thereafter. He remained at Crystal Palace as a scout before being appointed manager of Darlington in 1950, where he remained for two seasons.

== Managerial statistics ==
Team	From	To	Record				
Team	From	To	G	W	L	D	Win %
Crystal Palace	July 1939	May 1947	42	13	17	12	31.0
Darlington	April 1950	March 1952	87	22	44	21	25.3
