= Steve Parish (businessman) =

English businessman (born 1965)

- Born: 18 July 1965 (age 61); London, England
- Education: Colfe's School
- Occupation: Businessman
- Title: Chairman, Crystal Palace F.C.
- Children: 3

Stephen Parish (born 18 July 1965) is an English businessman who is the co-owner and chairman of the Premier League football club Crystal Palace.

== Early life, education and personal life ==
Parish was born in Forest Hill, London, attending Christ Church School and later Colfe's School. In November 2018, it was announced that Parish was in a relationship with Good Morning Britain presenter, Susanna Reid. Five months later, in April 2019, Parish and Reid separated.

== Career ==
Steve Parish began his career working in computer graphics. He went on to buy a stake in a company called Adplates Ltd, assuming control of the business and renaming it Tag Worldwide, transforming it into a global business with 2,800 employees in 13 countries. He sold the business to Deutsche Post DHL Group's Williams Lea in 2011. In April 2017, it was announced that Parish was going to join the Dragons' Den line-up for the 14th series of the show. However, it was later announced by Parish that he had withdrawn.

=== Crystal Palace Football Club ===
In June 2010, Parish led a consortium called 'CPFC 2010' to acquire Crystal Palace and save the club from a second spell in administration and imminent liquidation after negotiating a £3.5m deal to buy Selhurst Park from Lloyds Bank. He became chairman and leading shareholder of the Club with three fellow supporters, Stephen Browett, Jeremy Hosking and Martin Long.

In January 2011, Parish unveiled plans to move Crystal Palace to a new 40,000-seat stadium at their original home – now the National Sports Centre. In May 2013, the South London based club was promoted to the English Premier League after beating Watford in the play-off final at Wembley Stadium, and have remained there to this day.

A deal was completed in December 2015 with American investors David Blitzer and Josh Harris, in which they each took an 18% stake in the club, injecting £50m capital and becoming co-owners alongside Parish, who remained chairman. In 2016, Crystal Palace reached the FA Cup Final but were beaten 2-1 by Manchester United.

In December 2017, Parish announced £75m to £100m plans to redevelop Selhurst Park, commissioning stadium architects KSS to build a new five-story Main Stand to increase the capacity from 26,000 to 34,000, transforming the matchday experience and providing enhanced community facilities. After the scheme was granted planning permission by Croydon Council in April 2018, Parish said: "This project will not only transform the stadium, which has been our home since 1924, but it will also have a positive impact on the south London community”.

Parish revealed plans in October 2019 for a £20m redevelopment of the Club's Academy, having secured a long-term lease for the site in Beckenham in December 2018, with enhanced playing and welfare facilities for the Club's young players. In July 2020, a month after Bromley Council granted planning permission, the Academy was awarded Category 1 status by the Premier League.

In May 2020, Parish was credited by retired footballer and pundit Gary Neville with playing a key role in the return of Premier League football after the coronavirus pandemic following his support for 'Project Restart' in a Sunday Times column.

In an October 2020 Sunday Times column, Parish explained why the Premier League was right to reject 'Project Big Picture', a plan by Liverpool and Manchester United to restructure the league, and in April 2021, Parish was opposed to the proposed European Super League.

In May 2025, Parish oversaw Crystal Palace win, 1–0, against Manchester City, in the 2025 FA Cup final at Wembley Stadium, which was the club's first ever major trophy.
