= Ferri =

Ferri is an Albanian, French, and Italian surname. Notable people with the surname include:

- Alessandra Ferri (born 1963), Italian prima ballerina assoluta
- Alessandro Ferri (1921–2003), Italian football player
- Antonio Ferri (1912–1975), Italian scientist
- Baldassare Ferri (1610–1680), Italian castrato singer
- Blaine Ferri (born 2000), American soccer player
- Bonnie Ferri, American electrical engineer and academic administrator
- Ciro Ferri (1634–1689), Italian Baroque sculptor and painter
- Clodoveo Ferri (born 1947), Italian clinical researcher
- Daniele Ferri (born 1992), Italian footballer
- Diamond Ferri (born 1981), player of American and Canadian football
- Elda Ferri, Italian film producer
- Enrico Ferri (criminologist) (1856–1929), Italian criminologist and socialist
- Flávio Ferri, Brazilian football player
- Frank Ferri (born 1954), American politician from Rhode Island
- Gabriella Ferri (1942–2004), Italian singer
- Gallieno Ferri (1929–2016), Italian comic book artist and illustrator
- Gesualdo Francesco Ferri (1728–1788), Italian painter
- Giacomo Ferri (born 1959), Italian football player and manager
- Guy Ferri (1922–1991), American diplomat and United Nations official
- Héctor Ferri (born 1968), Ecuadorian football player
- Irene Ferri (born 1972), Italian actress
- Jacopo Ferri (born 1995), Italian football player
- Jakup Ferri (1832–1879), Albanian military leader from Plav
- Jakup Ferri (born 1981) Kosovar Albanian artist
- Janice Ferri Esser, American writer
- Jean-Michel Ferri (born 1969), French football player
- Jean-Yves Ferri (born 1959), French writer, designer and colourist of comics
- Jordan Ferri (born 1992), French football player
- Lambert Ferri (1250–1300), French trouvère and cleric
- Liana Ferri, Italian screenwriter, script supervisor and occasional film actress
- Linda Ferri (born 1957), Italian author and screenwriter
- Luca Ferri (born 1980), Italian football player
- Luigi Ferri (1826–1895), Italian philosopher
- Karine Ferri (born 1982), French television presenter and model
- Mario Ferri (born 1982), Italian-Canadian community organizer, activist and municipal
- Mário Guimarães Ferri (1918–1985), Brazilian academic
- Marta Ferri (born 1984), Italian fashion designer
- Mauro Ferri (1920–2015), Italian politician and judge
- Michael Brini Ferri (born 1989), Italian football player
- Michele Ferri (born 1981), Italian football player
- Patrice Ferri, French football player
- Paul Ferri, Italian-American venture capitalist
- Pierre Ferri (1904–1993), French stockbroker and politician
- Rexhep Ferri (1937–2024) Kosovar Albanian artist
- Riccardo Ferri (born 1963), Italian football player
- Roberto Ferri (born 1978), Italian artist and painter
- Romolo Ferri (1928–2015), Italian motorcycle road racer
- Ron Ferri (1932–2019), American artist

== See also ==
- 13326 Ferri, main-belt asteroid
- Feri (disambiguation)
- Ferro (disambiguation)
- Ferrie (disambiguation)
- Ferry (disambiguation)
