= 1921 in association football =

The following are the football (soccer) events of the year 1921 throughout the world.

== Events ==
- September – There is a split in Irish football following the political partition of Ireland. The leading Dublin clubs breakaway from the Belfast-based Irish Football Association over a perceived northern bias. See:FAI – Split from the IFA
- By 1921 women's football had become increasingly popular through the charitable games played by women's teams during and after the First World War. In a move that was widely seen as caused by jealousy of the crowds' interest in women's games which frequently exceeded that of the top men's teams, in 1921 the Football Association banned all women's teams from playing on grounds affiliated to the FA because they thought football damaged women's bodies. For several decades, this meant that women's football virtually ceased to exist.

== Winners club national championship ==
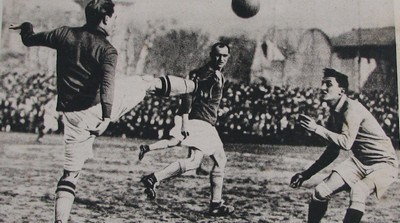
France – Italy (1–2), friendly, 20 February 1921.

- Argentina: Club Atlético Huracán, Racing Club
- Austria: Rapid Vienna
- Belgium: Daring CB
- Denmark: Akademisk Boldklub
- England: Burnley F.C.
- France: no national championship
- Germany: 1. FC Nürnberg
- Hungary: MTK Hungária FC
- Iceland: Fram
- Italy: Pro Vercelli
- Luxembourg: Jeunesse Esch
- Netherlands: NAC Breda
- Paraguay: Club Guaraní
- Poland: Cracovia
- Scotland: For fuller coverage, see 1920–21 in Scottish football.
  - Scottish Division One – Rangers
  - Scottish Cup – Partick Thistle
- Sweden: IFK Eskilstuna
- Uruguay: Peñarol
- Greece: 1913 to 1921 – no championship titles due to the First World War and the Greco-Turkish War of 1919–1922.

== Founded clubs ==
- FK Željezničar

== International tournaments ==
- 1921 British Home Championship (October 23, 1920 – April 9, 1921)

Scotland

- 1921 Far Eastern Championship Games in China (May 30-June 2, 1921)

(Beiyang government) China

- South American Championship 1921 in Argentina (October 2, 1921 – October 30, 1921)

Argentina

== Births ==
- February 10 – Theodor Reimann, Slovak international footballer (died 1982)
- February 25 – Alessandro Ferri, Italian professional footballer (died 2003)
- May 12 – Cor van der Hoeven, Dutch footballer (died 2017)
- May 23 – Wilf Chisholm, English professional footballer (died 1962)
- July 26 – Amedeo Amadei, Italian international footballer and manager (died 2013)
- August 1 – Percy Lovett, English footballer, goalkeeper (died 1982)
- October 6 – Des Broomfield, English footballer (died 2007)
- October 19 – Gunnar Nordahl, Swedish international footballer (died 1995)
- November 11 – Ron Greenwood, English football manager (died 2006)

Undated:

- Arie Machnes, Israeli footballer (died 2008)

== Clubs founded ==
- Deportivo Alavés
