= Ferry (disambiguation) =

A ferry is a form of transport across water.

Ferry may also refer to:

== Places ==
=== United Kingdom ===
- Broughty Ferry, a former village and now suburb of Dundee, Scotland
- Ferry Point, England
- Ferry Road, in Scotland
- Owston Ferry, a village in Lincolnshire, England

=== United States ===
- Ferry, Alaska, a census-designated place
- Ferry, Ohio, an unincorporated community
- Ferry County, Washington
- Ferry Pass, Florida
- Ferry Township, Michigan
- Harpers Ferry (disambiguation), several places in the United States of America

=== Elsewhere ===
- Ferry Island, in British Columbia, Canada
- Ferry Point, Hong Kong, China

== Buildings and structures ==
- San Francisco Ferry Building, a ferry terminal in San Francisco Bay, California
- Ferry Farm, the childhood home of George Washington in Stafford County, Virginia
- Ferry Field, a stadium in Ann Arbor, Michigan
- Ferry railway station in Norfolk, England

== People with the given name ==
- Ferry Carondelet (1473–1528), Habsburg diplomat
- Ferry Corsten (born 1973), Dutch musician
- Ferenc Kocsur (1930–1990), Hungarian-French footballer
- Ferry Porsche (1909–1998), Austrian-German automobile designer, son of Ferdinand Porsche
- Ferry Rotinsulu (born 1982), Indonesian footballer
- Ferry Sonneville (1931–2003), Indonesian badminton player

== Other uses ==
- Ferry (surname)
- Ferry (horse)
- Ferry (2021 film), a Belgo-Dutch film starring Frank Lammers as Ferry Bouwman
- Ferry (1954 film), an Indian Hindi-language film
- Ferry flying, transportation of aircraft

== See also ==
- Fairy, a magical or mystical legendary being
- Fairey (disambiguation)
- Ferri (disambiguation)
- Ferrie (disambiguation)
