= Fery =

Fery or Féry is a surname. Notable people with the surname include:

- Alibée Féry (1818–1896), Haitian playwright, poet, and storyteller
- Arthur Fery (born 2002), British tennis player
- Gaston Féry (1900-1985), French sprinter
- John Fery (1859–1934), Austrian Empire-born American painter
- Loïc Féry (born 1974), French businessman
- Olivia Féry (born 1973), French retired tennis player

== See also ==
- Feri (disambiguation)
