= László Passuth =

László Passuth (Budapest, Hungary July 15, 1900- Balatonfüred, Hungary June 19, 1979) was a prolific Hungarian author of historical novels and translator. He is the father of art historian, Krisztina Passuth.

He graduated with a law degree from the University of Szeged. From 1919 to 1950 he worked mainly as a bank clerk and then, until his retirement, in a government office for translation. His first attempts as a writer appeared in the 1920s in several magazines. Passuth served as the main secretary of the Hungarian PEN Club from 1945–60, although he was expelled in 1948 from the Hungarian Writers’ Union after the Stalinist take-over.

His first novel, Eurasia, published in 1937, was followed by a number of historical novels; they showed sophisticated style and attention to precise historical details. In 1939, he published Tlaloc Weeps for Mexico, a novel about Hernán Cortés and the conquest of the Aztec Empire; it was his first work to attract international attention; it was translated into French, German, Spanish, and English. Among his some 40 novels are also Joan of Naples (1940), based on the life of the medieval queen, Joan I, and Madrigal (1968), a novel around the life of composer Carlo Gesualdo.

== Partial bibliography ==
Eurasia (1937); Studies, Budapest (1937); The Rain God Weeps over Mexico (1939) (Eng. Title, Tlaloc Weeps for Mexico); Joan of Naples (1940); The Lombard Château (1940-1944); The Porphyrogenitus (Born in Purple) (1943); The Revolving Door (1944); Cloud and Oasis (1946); Black Velvet (1946); Aliens (1949); In the Eagle’s Talons (1956); Four Winds in Transylvania (1957); The Musician of the Duke of Mantua (1957) about Monteverdi; Lagoons (1958); The World of Tombs Will Talk (1959); Paradise in the Ocean (1959); The Dragon’s Teeth (1960); The Third Majordomo (1962) (about Velazquez); Rome was buried in Ravenna (1963) about Theodoric the Ostrogoth; The Gods of Gold are Cold (1964) about Raphaël; Trench (1966); Madrigal (1968) about Gesualdo; Copper (1969); Eternal Spain (1969); Field cut seven times (1970); Naples (1972) (educational book); My encounter with the Rain God (1972); Gyilokjáró (1973); King in the Broken Mirror (1974); Memorial and So Forth (1975); Tower of Shadows (articles, essays and travel notes) (1977); Cave Pictures (autobiog.) (1978); Medusa (1979); Mirror of Water (1980); Ten Years under the same roof (1981), Anselme (1983).

== Sources ==
(hu) (es) This article is essentially taken from the Hungarian and Spanish Wikipedia articles on László Passuth.

== External sources ==
- Biography in Spanish
- Biographical notes in Spanish
- Obituary, in Spanish. Diario ABC, 21 June 1979, page. 31
