= 1920–21 Football League =

29th season of the Football League

The Football League
- Season: 1920–21
- Champions: Burnley
- New clubs in League: 23 (see tables)

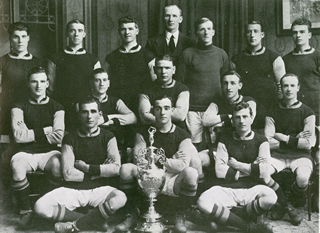
The team photograph of the Championship-winning Burnley F.C. side in the 1920-21 season

The 1920–21 season was the 29th season of The Football League.

The Football League Third Division was introduced, in effect the Third Division South of the following season, when Third Division North was introduced. This expanded the League's operational radius all the way to the south coast of England, as the number of member clubs increased from 44 to 66.

== Team changes ==
The new Third Division was formed by clubs of the Southern Football League Division One of the previous season, except for Cardiff City. Cardiff City became the first Welsh club to enter the League, and since they were the strongest club in Wales in the era, they were invited directly into the Second Division. Grimsby Town took its place in the new Third Division, thereby being the first club relegated to the League's third tier. Leeds United were also elected into the Second Division to replace Leeds City after its debacle. Lincoln City were not re-elected to the Second Division and thus Port Vale's Second Division place was formalized as well.

== Final league tables ==
Beginning in the 1894–95 season, clubs finishing level on points were separated according to goal average (goals scored divided by goals conceded). In case one or more teams had the same goal difference, this system favoured those teams who had scored fewer goals. The goal average system was eventually scrapped beginning with the 1976–77 season.

During the first six seasons of the league, (up to the 1893–94 season), re-election process concerned the clubs which finished in the bottom four of the league. From the 1894–95 season and until the 1920–21 season the re-election process was required of the clubs which finished in the bottom three of the league.

== First Division ==
First Division
- Season: 1920–21
- Champions: Burnley; 1st English title
- Relegated: Derby County; Bradford Park Avenue
- Matches: 462
- Goals: 1,276 (2.76 per match)
- Top goalscorer: Joe Smith (38 goals)
- Biggest home win: Liverpool 6–0 Preston North End (25 September 1920); Burnley 7–1 Oldham Athletic (27 November 1920); Burnley 6–0 Sheffield United (25 December 1920); Burnley 7–1 Aston Villa (5 February 1921)
- Biggest away win: Chelsea 0–4 Tottenham Hotspur (16 October 1920); Huddersfield Town 0–4 Arsenal (20 November 1920); Aston Villa 1–5 Sunderland (12 February 1921); Arsenal 2–6 Sheffield United (26 March 1921)
- Highest scoring: Newcastle United 6–3 Manchester United (1 January 1921)

Pos	Team	Pld	W	D	L	GF	GA	GAv	Pts	Relegation
1	Burnley (C)	42	23	13	6	79	36	2.194	59	
2	Manchester City	42	24	6	12	70	50	1.400	54	
3	Bolton Wanderers	42	19	14	9	77	53	1.453	52	
4	Liverpool	42	18	15	9	63	35	1.800	51	
5	Newcastle United	42	20	10	12	66	45	1.467	50	
6	Tottenham Hotspur	42	19	9	14	70	48	1.458	47	
7	Everton	42	17	13	12	66	55	1.200	47	
8	Middlesbrough	42	17	12	13	53	53	1.000	46	
9	Arsenal	42	15	14	13	59	63	0.937	44	
10	Aston Villa	42	18	7	17	63	70	0.900	43	
11	Blackburn Rovers	42	13	15	14	57	59	0.966	41	
12	Sunderland	42	14	13	15	57	60	0.950	41	
13	Manchester United	42	15	10	17	64	68	0.941	40	
14	West Bromwich Albion	42	13	14	15	54	58	0.931	40	
15	Bradford City	42	12	15	15	61	63	0.968	39	
16	Preston North End	42	15	9	18	61	65	0.938	39	
17	Huddersfield Town	42	15	9	18	42	49	0.857	39	
18	Chelsea	42	13	13	16	48	58	0.828	39	
19	Oldham Athletic	42	9	15	18	49	86	0.570	33	
20	Sheffield United	42	6	18	18	42	68	0.618	30	
21	Derby County (R)	42	5	16	21	32	58	0.552	26	Relegation to the Second Division
22	Bradford (Park Avenue) (R)	42	8	8	26	43	76	0.566	24	Relegation to the Second Division

Source: World Football
Rules for classification: 1) Points; 2) Goal average; 3) Goals scored
(C) Champions; (R) Relegated

=== Results ===
Home \ Away	ARS	AST	BLB	BOL	BRA	BPA	BUR	CHE	DER	EVE	HUD	LIV	MCI	MUN	MID	NEW	OLD	PNE	SHU	SUN	TOT	WBA
Arsenal		0–1	2–0	0–0	1–2	2–1	1–1	1–1	2–0	1–1	2–0	0–0	2–1	2–0	2–2	1–1	2–2	2–1	2–6	1–2	3–2	2–1
Aston Villa	5–0		3–0	2–0	1–2	4–1	0–0	3–0	1–0	1–3	0–0	0–2	3–1	3–4	0–1	0–0	3–0	1–0	4–0	1–5	4–2	0–0
Blackburn Rovers	2–2	0–1		2–2	2–3	1–0	1–3	0–0	2–0	0–0	1–2	1–1	0–2	2–0	3–2	3–3	5–1	2–2	1–1	2–0	1–1	5–1
Bolton Wanderers	1–1	5–0	2–1		1–1	2–0	1–1	3–1	1–0	4–2	3–1	1–0	3–0	1–1	6–2	3–1	1–1	3–0	2–2	6–2	1–0	3–0
Bradford City	3–1	3–0	3–4	2–2		2–1	2–0	1–1	2–2	2–2	0–2	0–0	1–2	1–1	0–1	1–1	1–3	6–2	4–0	2–2	1–0	1–1
Bradford Park Avenue	0–1	4–0	1–1	2–1	1–2		1–3	0–2	2–1	3–3	1–1	1–3	1–2	2–4	3–0	0–2	2–1	1–3	2–0	1–1	1–1	0–3
Burnley	1–0	7–1	4–1	3–1	1–4	1–0		4–0	2–1	1–1	3–0	1–0	2–1	1–0	2–1	3–1	7–1	2–0	6–0	2–2	2–0	1–1
Chelsea	1–2	5–1	1–2	1–0	3–1	4–1	1–1		1–1	0–1	1–1	1–1	2–1	1–2	1–1	2–0	1–1	1–1	2–1	3–1	0–4	3–0
Derby County	1–1	2–3	0–1	0–0	1–1	1–0	0–0	0–0		2–4	2–1	0–0	3–0	1–1	0–1	0–1	3–3	1–1	1–1	0–1	2–2	1–1
Everton	2–4	1–1	2–1	2–3	2–2	1–1	1–1	5–1	3–1		0–0	0–3	3–0	2–0	2–1	3–1	5–2	0–1	3–0	1–1	0–0	2–2
Huddersfield Town	0–4	1–0	0–0	0–0	1–0	0–0	1–0	2–0	2–0	0–1		1–2	0–1	5–2	0–1	1–3	3–1	1–0	1–0	0–0	2–0	5–1
Liverpool	3–0	4–1	2–0	2–3	2–1	0–1	0–0	2–1	1–1	1–0	4–1		4–2	2–0	0–0	0–1	5–2	6–0	2–2	0–0	1–1	0–0
Manchester City	3–1	3–1	0–0	3–1	1–0	1–0	3–0	1–0	0–0	2–0	3–2	3–2		3–0	2–1	3–1	3–1	5–1	2–1	3–1	2–0	4–0
Manchester United	1–1	1–3	0–1	2–3	1–1	5–1	0–3	3–1	3–0	1–2	2–0	1–1	1–1		0–1	2–0	4–1	1–0	2–1	3–0	0–1	1–4
Middlesbrough	2–1	1–4	1–1	4–1	2–1	2–1	0–0	0–0	1–0	3–1	2–0	0–1	3–1	2–4		0–0	1–2	0–0	2–2	2–0	1–0	0–1
Newcastle United	1–0	2–1	1–2	1–0	4–0	2–1	1–2	1–0	0–1	2–0	1–0	2–0	1–1	6–3	2–0		1–2	4–2	3–0	6–1	1–1	1–1
Oldham Athletic	1–1	1–1	1–0	0–0	2–0	1–0	2–2	1–2	2–1	0–1	1–2	0–0	2–0	2–2	3–3	0–0		0–2	0–0	2–1	2–5	0–3
Preston North End	0–1	6–1	4–2	1–2	1–1	3–3	0–3	0–1	2–1	1–0	0–1	2–3	0–1	0–0	2–0	3–2	4–0		2–0	1–1	4–1	2–1
Sheffield United	1–1	0–0	1–1	2–2	4–1	2–0	1–1	0–1	0–1	2–0	1–1	0–1	1–1	0–0	1–1	0–3	3–0	1–0		1–1	1–1	0–2
Sunderland	5–1	0–1	2–0	0–0	0–0	5–1	1–0	1–0	3–0	0–2	2–1	2–1	1–0	2–3	1–2	0–2	1–1	2–2	3–1		0–1	3–0
Tottenham Hotspur	2–1	1–2	1–2	5–2	2–0	2–0	1–2	5–0	2–0	2–0	1–0	1–0	2–0	4–1	2–2	2–0	5–1	1–2	4–1	0–0		1–0
West Bromwich Albion	3–4	2–1	1–1	2–1	2–0	0–1	2–0	1–1	3–0	1–2	3–0	1–1	2–2	0–2	0–1	0–0	0–0	0–3	1–1	4–1	3–1	

Legend: Blue = home team win; Yellow = draw; Red = away team win.

=== Maps ===
Locations of the Football League First Division teams
Locations of the Football League First Division London teams

== Second Division ==
Football League Second Division
- Season: 1920–21
- Champions: Birmingham (2nd title)
- Relegated: Stockport County
- Matches: 462
- Goals: 1,061 (2.3 per match)
- Top goalscorer: Sydney (Syd) Puddefoot (West Ham United), 29
- Biggest home win: West Ham United – Coventry City 7–0 (1 Jan 1921)
- Biggest away win: Rotherham County – Bury 0–5 (11 Dec 1921)
- Highest scoring: Rotherham County – South Shields 5–4 (2 Oct 1920)

Pos	Team	Pld	W	D	L	GF	GA	GAv	Pts	Promotion or relegation
1	Birmingham (C, P)	42	24	10	8	79	38	2.079	58	Promotion to the Frst Division
2	Cardiff City (P)	42	24	10	8	59	32	1.844	58	Promotion to the Frst Division
3	Bristol City	42	19	13	10	49	29	1.690	51	
4	Blackpool	42	20	10	12	54	42	1.286	50	
5	West Ham United	42	19	10	13	51	30	1.700	48	
6	Notts County	42	18	11	13	55	40	1.375	47	
7	Clapton Orient	42	16	13	13	43	42	1.024	45	
8	South Shields	42	17	10	15	61	46	1.326	44	
9	Fulham	42	16	10	16	43	47	0.915	42	
10	The Wednesday	42	15	11	16	48	48	1.000	41	
11	Bury	42	15	10	17	45	49	0.918	40	
12	Leicester City	42	12	16	14	39	46	0.848	40	
13	Hull City	42	10	20	12	43	53	0.811	40	
14	Leeds United	42	14	10	18	40	45	0.889	38	
15	Wolverhampton Wanderers	42	16	6	20	49	66	0.742	38	
16	Barnsley	42	10	16	16	48	50	0.960	36	
17	Port Vale	42	11	14	17	43	49	0.878	36	
18	Nottingham Forest	42	12	12	18	48	55	0.873	36	
19	Rotherham County	42	12	12	18	37	53	0.698	36	
20	Stoke	42	12	11	19	46	56	0.821	35	
21	Coventry City	42	12	11	19	39	70	0.557	35	
22	Stockport County (R)	42	9	12	21	42	75	0.560	30	Relegation to the Third Division North

(C) Champions; (P) Promoted; (R) Relegated

=== Results ===
Home \ Away	BAR	BIR	BLP	BRI	BRY	CAR	CLA	COV	FUL	HUL	LEE	LEI	NOT	NTC	PTV	ROT	SSH	STP	STK	WED	WHU	WOL
Barnsley		1–1	0–1	1–1	5–0	0–2	1–0	2–2	3–1	0–0	1–1	2–1	0–0	2–2	3–0	2–1	1–1	2–0	1–0	0–0	1–1	3–2
Birmingham	1–3		3–0	0–0	4–0	1–1	0–0	3–2	1–0	5–1	1–0	5–0	3–0	2–1	4–0	3–2	1–1	5–0	3–0	4–0	2–1	4–1
Blackpool	1–0	3–0		1–2	0–1	2–4	2–2	4–0	1–0	1–2	1–0	2–0	1–0	0–2	1–0	0–1	3–2	1–1	3–1	1–1	1–0	3–0
Bristol City	1–0	0–1	1–1		1–0	0–0	2–0	2–0	2–0	2–1	0–0	1–0	1–0	0–1	3–0	2–4	4–2	5–1	5–0	0–1	1–0	2–0
Bury	0–0	0–1	2–2	2–0		3–1	0–1	2–0	1–1	0–0	1–1	4–0	2–2	0–1	1–0	1–0	1–0	1–1	3–0	1–1	1–0	3–1
Cardiff City	3–2	2–1	0–0	1–0	2–1		0–0	0–1	3–0	0–0	1–0	2–0	3–0	1–1	1–2	1–0	1–0	3–0	0–1	1–0	0–0	2–0
Clapton Orient	3–2	1–1	0–0	0–0	1–0	2–0		0–0	3–0	1–1	1–0	2–0	2–1	3–0	0–0	2–0	1–0	5–0	3–2	1–0	0–1	0–1
Coventry City	3–1	0–4	0–2	2–1	1–0	2–4	1–1		0–2	3–2	1–1	1–0	0–0	1–1	0–0	0–1	1–0	1–1	1–0	2–3	0–1	4–0
Fulham	1–0	5–0	1–2	3–0	0–0	0–3	1–0	2–0		3–0	1–0	1–1	2–1	3–1	1–0	1–0	0–0	3–1	1–3	2–0	0–0	2–0
Hull City	3–0	1–0	2–1	2–0	1–1	2–0	3–0	1–1	0–0		0–1	1–1	0–3	1–1	1–1	1–1	0–2	1–1	1–1	1–1	2–1	0–1
Leeds United	0–0	1–0	2–0	0–1	1–0	1–2	2–1	4–0	0–0	1–1		3–1	1–1	3–0	3–1	1–0	1–2	0–2	0–0	2–0	1–2	3–0
Leicester City	2–0	3–0	0–1	0–0	4–0	2–0	2–1	0–1	1–1	0–0	1–1		2–0	0–3	0–0	1–1	2–0	0–0	3–1	2–1	1–0	0–0
Nottingham Forest	0–0	1–1	3–1	0–1	4–2	1–2	1–1	0–2	5–1	2–0	1–0	1–2		1–0	1–4	6–1	1–2	1–1	2–2	4–2	1–0	1–1
Notts County	1–0	0–0	1–2	2–2	2–1	1–2	3–1	1–1	2–1	4–1	1–2	1–1	2–0		0–1	1–0	2–0	3–0	3–0	3–0	1–1	2–1
Port Vale	1–1	0–2	0–1	0–2	3–0	0–0	4–0	0–0	0–0	4–0	2–0	0–0	0–1	1–2		1–1	0–2	6–1	2–1	1–0	1–2	2–3
Rotherham County	1–0	1–1	0–2	0–0	0–5	2–0	0–0	2–3	2–0	1–1	0–2	1–1	0–0	0–0	1–1		5–4	1–0	1–1	2–0	2–0	1–0
South Shields	3–2	3–0	1–0	0–0	2–0	0–1	3–0	4–1	3–0	0–0	3–0	4–3	0–1	1–0	6–1	1–0		3–1	1–1	2–3	0–0	1–2
Stockport County	3–2	0–3	2–2	0–2	1–2	2–5	6–0	3–0	1–1	2–2	3–1	0–0	1–0	1–0	0–0	0–1	0–0		2–0	0–1	2–0	1–2
Stoke	3–2	1–2	1–1	0–0	0–1	0–0	0–1	4–1	1–2	1–3	4–0	1–1	4–0	1–0	0–1	2–0	0–0	1–0		0–1	1–0	1–0
The Wednesday	0–0	1–2	0–1	2–2	2–0	0–1	1–1	3–0	3–0	3–0	2–0	0–0	0–0	1–1	1–0	2–0	1–1	2–1	1–3		0–1	6–0
West Ham United	2–1	1–1	1–1	1–0	0–1	1–1	1–0	7–0	2–0	1–1	3–0	0–1	3–0	0–2	1–1	1–0	2–1	5–0	1–0	4–0		1–0
Wolverhampton Wanderers	1–1	0–3	3–1	0–0	2–1	1–3	0–2	1–0	1–0	1–3	3–0	3–0	2–1	1–0	2–2	3–0	3–0	2–0	3–3	1–2	1–2	

Source: Ian Laschke: Rothmans Book of Football League Records 1888–89 to 1978–79. Macdonald and Jane’s, London & Sydney, 1980.
Legend: Blue = home team win; Yellow = draw; Red = away team win.

=== Maps ===
Locations of the Football League Second Division teams
Locations of the Football League Second Division London teams

== Third Division ==
Football League Third Division
- Season: 1920–21
- Champions: Crystal Palace (1st title)
- Failed re-election: None
- Matches: 462
- Goals: 1,133 (2.45 per match)
- Top goalscorer: John Conner (Crystal Palace), 28; Ernie Simms (Luton Town), 28; George Whitworth (Northampton Town), 28

Pos	Team	Pld	W	D	L	GF	GA	GR	Pts	Promotion
1	Crystal Palace (C, P)	42	24	11	7	70	34	2.059	59	Promotion to the Second Division
2	Southampton	42	19	16	7	64	28	2.286	54	
3	Queens Park Rangers	42	22	9	11	61	32	1.906	53	
4	Swindon Town	42	21	10	11	73	49	1.490	52	
5	Swansea Town	42	18	15	9	56	45	1.244	51	
6	Watford	42	20	8	14	59	44	1.341	48	
7	Millwall	42	18	11	13	42	30	1.400	47	
8	Merthyr Town	42	15	15	12	60	49	1.224	45	
9	Luton Town	42	16	12	14	61	56	1.089	44	
10	Bristol Rovers	42	18	7	17	68	57	1.193	43	
11	Plymouth Argyle	42	11	21	10	35	34	1.029	43	
12	Portsmouth	42	12	15	15	46	48	0.958	39	
13	Grimsby Town	42	15	9	18	49	59	0.831	39	Transferred to the Third Division North
14	Northampton Town	42	15	8	19	59	75	0.787	38	
15	Newport County	42	14	9	19	43	64	0.672	37	
16	Norwich City	42	10	16	16	44	53	0.830	36	
17	Southend United	42	14	8	20	44	61	0.721	36	
18	Brighton & Hove Albion	42	14	8	20	42	61	0.689	36	
19	Exeter City	42	10	15	17	39	54	0.722	35	
20	Reading	42	12	7	23	42	59	0.712	31	
21	Brentford	42	9	12	21	42	67	0.627	30	Re-elected
22	Gillingham	42	8	12	22	34	74	0.459	28	Re-elected

Source: fchd.info
(C) Champions; (P) Promoted

=== Results ===
Home \ Away	BRE	B&HA	BRR	CRY	EXE	GIL	GRI	LUT	MER	MIL	NPC	NOR	NWC	PLY	POR	QPR	REA	SOU	STD	SWA	SWI	WAT
Brentford		2–0	0–0	0–4	0–0	3–3	5–0	1–0	0–0	1–0	2–2	1–1	3–1	0–0	1–2	0–2	3–2	1–1	2–2	1–2	0–1	1–0
Brighton & Hove Albion	4–0		2–0	0–2	1–1	1–0	1–3	1–1	0–0	1–0	1–0	3–2	2–0	1–0	3–0	2–1	2–2	1–1	1–0	1–1	0–3	0–3
Bristol Rovers	2–1	3–1		2–1	5–0	2–0	2–0	5–0	1–1	1–2	3–2	4–2	2–2	2–0	2–2	3–0	3–2	1–2	2–1	1–2	3–1	2–0
Crystal Palace	4–2	3–2	3–0		2–1	4–1	2–0	2–1	3–0	3–2	2–0	5–1	1–0	0–0	3–0	0–0	2–0	1–1	2–3	0–1	1–0	2–2
Exeter City	3–0	1–0	1–0	1–1		2–1	1–1	1–0	3–3	4–0	0–1	4–0	1–1	1–1	0–0	0–1	0–1	1–0	0–0	1–2	1–0	1–2
Gillingham	1–3	1–0	1–0	0–1	2–1		2–1	0–0	0–0	0–0	1–4	2–5	0–0	0–1	1–1	1–2	1–0	1–1	1–1	2–1	1–1	1–1
Grimsby Town	2–0	2–2	3–1	1–0	2–0	2–0		0–1	1–1	0–2	1–1	2–0	1–1	1–1	0–3	2–1	2–0	3–0	1–0	0–2	3–0	3–0
Luton Town	2–0	3–2	1–2	2–2	3–0	5–0	3–1		1–0	0–0	2–2	3–1	4–0	1–1	2–2	2–1	6–0	1–1	4–0	3–0	2–0	1–0
Merthyr Town	3–1	4–1	2–2	2–1	7–1	6–1	3–1	4–1		0–1	1–2	1–0	0–0	0–0	2–1	3–1	1–0	1–1	2–0	0–3	2–2	2–0
Millwall	0–0	0–1	2–0	0–1	2–0	4–0	0–1	0–0	0–0		1–0	1–0	2–0	0–0	1–0	0–0	2–0	0–1	4–2	0–2	5–0	1–0
Newport County	3–1	0–4	0–2	0–1	2–0	1–0	2–1	2–0	0–3	3–1		1–1	2–0	0–0	1–0	1–3	0–1	0–0	1–1	1–1	0–1	0–2
Northampton Town	6–2	1–0	1–2	2–2	3–3	2–0	4–1	1–0	2–2	0–2	0–2		1–0	1–1	1–0	0–3	1–0	2–0	1–0	2–0	1–2	0–1
Norwich City	0–0	3–0	1–1	0–1	0–0	2–1	0–0	3–0	0–0	2–0	3–0	3–3		0–0	2–2	2–0	2–0	0–1	3–1	1–1	3–2	1–1
Plymouth Argyle	1–0	5–0	2–1	0–1	0–0	3–1	0–0	1–0	2–1	0–2	5–1	0–2	1–1		2–0	1–0	1–1	0–0	0–0	1–0	0–0	0–2
Portsmouth	0–2	3–0	1–0	0–0	2–1	2–2	2–1	3–0	0–0	0–0	0–2	2–0	2–1	1–1		0–0	2–2	0–1	3–0	3–0	1–1	1–0
Queens Park Rangers	1–0	4–0	2–1	3–0	2–1	0–1	2–0	4–1	4–2	0–0	2–0	1–2	2–0	4–0	0–0		2–0	0–0	2–0	1–1	1–0	1–2
Reading	2–1	0–1	2–1	1–0	0–1	1–2	4–1	0–1	2–0	0–1	4–0	4–0	0–1	1–1	1–0	0–0		0–4	1–1	1–3	2–3	0–0
Southampton	3–0	1–0	4–0	1–1	3–0	3–0	0–1	1–1	5–0	1–1	0–0	3–1	1–0	1–0	2–0	2–2	1–2		3–0	3–0	4–0	4–1
Southend United	4–1	2–0	1–0	0–2	0–0	1–0	3–1	1–1	0–1	1–2	2–1	1–2	3–1	2–1	2–1	1–0	1–0	1–0		1–2	1–3	4–1
Swansea Town	1–1	0–0	2–2	0–0	2–1	2–0	3–1	1–1	1–0	0–0	1–2	2–2	5–2	3–0	0–0	1–3	2–1	1–1	2–0		1–1	2–1
Swindon Town	1–0	2–0	2–1	1–3	1–1	1–1	0–0	9–1	3–0	4–1	5–0	2–1	4–2	1–1	5–2	0–1	2–0	3–2	3–0	0–0		2–0
Watford	1–0	1–0	2–1	1–1	0–0	3–1	4–2	1–0	1–0	1–0	5–1	7–1	2–0	1–1	3–2	0–2	1–2	0–0	3–0	3–0	0–1	

Updated to match(es) played on unknown. Source: Ian Laschke: Rothmans Book of Football League Records 1888–89 to 1978–79. Macdonald and Jane’s, London & Sydney, 1980.
Legend: Blue = home team win; Yellow = draw; Red = away team win.

=== Maps ===
Locations of the Football League Third Division teams
Locations of the Football League Third Division South London teams

== Attendances ==
=== Division One ===
No.	Club	Average
1	Newcastle United FC	41,265
2	Chelsea FC	38,520
3	Everton FC	37,215
4	Tottenham Hotspur FC	36,010
5	Arsenal FC	35,540
6	Manchester United	35,525
7	Liverpool FC	35,440
8	Aston Villa FC	35,145
9	Bolton Wanderers FC	34,400
10	Burnley FC	31,535
11	Manchester City FC	31,120
12	Sunderland AFC	28,765
13	Blackburn Rovers FC	27,930
14	West Bromwich Albion FC	27,915
15	Sheffield United FC	26,920
16	Middlesbrough FC	23,845
17	Bradford City AFC	22,585
18	Huddersfield Town AFC	22,240
19	Preston North End FC	21,310
20	Oldham Athletic FC	18,075
21	Derby County FC	16,235
22	Bradford Park Avenue AFC	16,005

== See also ==
- 1920–21 in English football
- 1920 in association football
- 1921 in association football
