= Ferry (surname) =

Ferry is a surname. Notable people with the surname include:

- April Ferry (born 1932), American costume designer
- Björn Ferry (born 1978), Swedish biathlete
- Bob Ferry (1937–2021), American basketball player and executive
- Bryan Ferry (born 1945), English musician
- Catherine Ferry (singer) (born 1953), French singer
- Danny Ferry (born 1966), American basketball player and executive
- David Ferry (actor) (born 1951), Canadian-born actor
- David Ferry (poet) (1924–2023), American poet and translator
- George Bowman Ferry (1851–1918), American architect
- James Ferry (disambiguation)
  - James Ferry (priest) (fl. 1992–2011), priest of the Anglican Church of Canada
  - James Ferry (footballer) (born 1997), English footballer
  - Jim Ferry (born 1967), American college basketball coach
- Jules Ferry (1832–1893), French statesman
- Lou Ferry (1927–2004), American Football coach
- Luc Ferry (born 1951), French philosopher
- Orris S. Ferry (1823–1875), American general and politician
- Otis Ferry (born 1982), son of Bryan, fox hunting activist
- Pasqual Ferry (fl. 1993–2010), comic book artist
- Ricardo Ruiz Ferry (1879–1956), Spanish author, sports journalist, and sports leader
- Simon Ferry (born 1988), Scottish footballer
- Thomas W. Ferry (1827–1896), American politician
- Tim Ferry (born 1975), motorcycle racer
- Vivian Ferry, American nanoscientist
- William H. Ferry (1819–1880), New York politician

== See also ==
- Ferry (disambiguation)
