= Ferrie =

Ferrie is a surname. Notable people with the surname include:

== People ==
- Adam Ferrie (1777–1863), early Canadian businessman and political figure who lived much of his life in Ireland
- Colin Campbell Ferrie (1808–1856), Canadian merchant, banker, and politician
- David Ferrie (1918–1967), private investigator and pilot who allegedly plotted to assassinate President John F. Kennedy
- Gladstone Ferrie (1892–1955), Liberal party member of the Canadian House of Commons
- Gordon Ferrie Hull (1870–1956), Canadian / American teacher, mathematician and physicist
- Gustave-Auguste Ferrié (1868–1932), French radio pioneer and army general
- Kenneth Ferrie (born 1978), English professional golfer
- Tracy Ferrie, one of two current bass players of Christian metal band Stryper

== Settlements ==
- Ferrie Township, a geographic township that is part of the municipality of Whitestone, Ontario, Canada

== See also ==
- Ferrie Bodde (born 1982), Dutch footballer who plays for Swansea City
- Ferri (disambiguation)
- Ferry (disambiguation)
