= WV-HEDW =

Association football club in Amsterdam, Netherlands

- Full name: Wilhelmina Vooruit Hortus Eendracht Doet Winnen
- Founded: 25 May 1908; 118 years ago
- Ground: Sportpark Middenmeer, Amsterdam
- Chairman: Ronald Nijsen
- League: Saturday Men First Class Amateur League Sunday Men Third Class Amateur League Saturday Women First Class Amateur League
- Website: https://www.wvhedw.nl/
colours

WV-HEDW, short for 'Wilhelmina Vooruit Hortus Eendracht Doet Winnen', is a football club in Amsterdam, Netherlands. The club is located at Sportpark Middenmeer. WV-HEDW was formed in 1956 after the merger of two clubs with predominantly Jewish members, namely Wilhelmina Vooruit, founded on 25 May 1908, and HEDW, which was formed in 1931 when Hortus, founded on 18 April 1912, and E.D.W. (Eendracht Doet Winnen, meaning unity leads to victory), founded on 8 November 1913, merged.

WV-HEDW is a club with facilities, a terrace, and eight football pitches, five of them artificial turf. WV-HEDW has some 2,100 members. This makes the club the second largest of Amsterdam. WV-HEDW will have 112 teams in competition in the 2025–2026 season: 50 senior teams, 32 teams aged 13 or older, and 30 teams under the age of 13. Of these 112 teams, 9 are women's and 17 are girls' teams.

WV-HEDW is by far the largest (amateur) senior and veteran team in the Netherlands. In the national ranking of best performing youth teams WV-HEDW has risen to the 14th place. The accommodation includes the André Lopes Dias Tribune, consisting of two separate parts (Diemen- and Cityside), which was opened in November 2023, along with the unveiling of the photo gallery along the main pitch, which offers an impression of 115 years of football (and baseball) at Wilhelmina Vooruit, Hortus, EDW, HEDW, and WV-HEDW.

== History ==
Wilhelmina Vooruit (1908–1956) In June 1906, Louis Aussen (14) and Martijn Sajet (13), together with six friends from secondary school, founded their own football club under the name Uitspanning Door Inspanning (UNI, meaning unharnessing by relaxation). Sajet later said about this remarkable name: "As schoolboys, we thought that the opposite of relaxation was unharnessing, but unharnessing is something you do with horses." The membership fee was set at 2 cents per week. One of the house rules was: "Players are not allowed to use offensive language towards each other during the game." A year after its founding, UNI merged with Sparta, a club of slightly older boys who had 'real goalposts'. This led to the creation of the new club UNI Sparta Combinatie (USC) in 2007. Because the two groups did not get along, 'the old UNI people' resigned their membership and founded a new club on Monday evening, 25 May 1908, named Wilhelmina. The founders were Louis Aussen (chairman), Martijn Sajet (secretary-treasurer), Piet Mantel, Mau Wijnberg, Hers Cauveren, Arnold van Moppes, and Sjim de Vries. The club colors were blue and white. The first purchase was 'a real football'. Initially, games were played on a small grass pitch in the Oosterpark. Later, they moved to a pitch of sand where the Linnaeusparkweg met the Linnaeuskade. Still later, they moved to the former Parkschouwburg, where there are now korfball pitches adjacent to the Wertheimplantsoen. Via Banstraat, Kruislaan opposite Zeeburgia, Kruislaan opposite the Nieuwe Ooster cemetery, and the Middenweg, Wilhelmina Vooruit eventually ended up at Sportpark Voorland in 1939, the ground where the club would remain for the next 59 years. In October 1910, Wilhelmina was admitted to the second class of the Amsterdam Football Association (AVB), where it immediately won the championship. The following year, it repeated that achievement in the first class, resulting in promotion to the major league of the NVB (Dutch Football Association). Because there was already a club called Wilhelmina from Den Bosch playing in the NVB, the Amsterdam Wilhelmina had to change its name. Under the new name Wilhelmina Vooruit, the club was placed in the western third class in 1912. In the 1914–1915 season, Wilhelmina Vooruit became undefeated champion, one point ahead of Amsterdam's DWS. Normally, this would have meant promotion to the second class, but due to the war and mobilization, the promotion and relegation rules were suspended for that season. "How lucky can you get," Sajet sighed years later. In 1928, Wilhelmina Vooruit was relegated to the fourth class, where it continued to play until World War II. Wilhelmina Vooruit quickly made a name for itself because of the grand parties the club organised, with theater and revue performances. On 1 August 1910 the first issue of the club magazine 'Onze Revue' appeared. "No football club in Amsterdam had its own printed newspaper at the time", Sajet wrote on the occasion of the club's 50th anniversary. Another remarkable event was the trip to Germany in 1912. Wilhelmina Vooruit played matches in Essen and Elberfeld. Association officials and journalists attended the departure of the train to the Ruhr region. Wilhelmina Vooruit took the initiative to establish a youth competition. A mandatory sports examination was introduced for its own members. On the occasion of its first anniversary, the 'Illustrated Sports Memorial Book' was published, with a foreword by Pierre de Coubertin (the self-proclaimed founder of the modern Olympic Games). All these memorable achievements were accomplished by board members who were not yet 21 years old at the time. Wilhelmina Vooruit was more than a football club; it was one big family. Typical of the family atmosphere was that for the athletics competition held in honour of the fifteenth anniversary in 1923, in addition to 'working' (playing) and supporting members (non-playing), also were invited to participate aspirants (youth members under 16), wives, fiancées and sisters of members. In that year, Wilhelmina Vooruit had no fewer than 109 supporting members, including 37 women. Although Wilhelmina Vooruit was a club with predominantly Jewish members, the Jewish element was not dominant. Most parties took place on Saturdays. The biggest party of the year was the Christmas party. As former board member Willem Melkman put it on the club's 70th anniversary: "Wilhelmina Vooruit originally consisted of a group of Jewish boys and quickly grew into a very mixed group, half Jewish, half 'Aryan', half from the so-called 'better' circles and half from the 'ordinary' class. Perhaps this composition contributed to the unique character of WV." According to former member David van Minden, fun and camaraderie were paramount at WV. It was a mixed club with predominantly Jewish members. The ratio was "certainly ninety to ten": "They were not orthodox. All goyim, as we call them. Liberal, in other words." In 1933, Wilhelmina Vooruit celebrated its silver jubilee with a big party featuring the famous Fien de la Mar. Wilhelmina Vooruit had become a popular club in Rhineland and Westphalia, but due to political developments in Germany, the destination of the annual trips in the 1930s was shifted to France. In the 1939–1940 season, three senior and two youth teams participated in the competition. After the German occupiers issued a ban on Jews entering sports facilities in 1941 on September 15, Wilhelmina Vooruit ceased its football activities. At that time, the club had 73 playing members, 61 of whom were Jewish.

After the end of the war, the club made a new start under the leadership of board members Martijn Sajet, Leo van Geuns, and Bob Meijer Hamel. In the 1945–1946 season, Wilhelmina Vooruit managed to field one team that narrowly avoided relegation to the AVB. Membership grew from 40 at the start of the season to 53 in December. In June 1947, Wilhelmina Vooruit had 100 playing members and another 100 supporting members. Until 15 December 1946, Wilhelmina Vooruit also had to play its home games on foreign soil. Court rulings were necessary to evict the Zeeburg gymnastics club from the old pitch at Sportpark Voorland and to get back its own goalposts. In 1949, Wilhelmina Vooruit was relegated to the AVB. There, it immediately became champion, after which it had to play for promotion/relegation against . . . fourth class HEDW. The decisive match, which attracted thousands of spectators, was ceased with HEDW leading 2–1 after referee J. van Waalwijk van Doorn fell ill and died. The KNVB decided to admit both teams to the fourth class. In 1952, Wilhelmina Vooruit was promoted to the third class, where it was still playing in 1956 when the club merged with HEDW.

Hortus (1912–1931) Hortus was founded in 1912, on 18 April in Huize Tas on Rapenburg, in the old Jewish quarter, by, among others, the very young David Wijnschenk and Nathan Nikkelsberg. The founding took quite some effort as Nikkelsberg recalled in 1948: "There was no money for a meeting room. But no matter, because didn't I have a gold ring? On Wijnschenk's advice, I took it to 'Uncle Jan' (the pawnbroker) and the money was there." Hortus' club colors were black and white. According to the 1927–1928 membership list, the official ´club uniform´ consisted of: "Jersey: black and white vertical stripes, shorts: black, socks: black." Since 1924, Hortus played its games on a pitch on Röntgenstraat. The club advanced to the NVB in 1915 after winning the first class championship of the Amsterdam Voetbal Bond (AVB). Four years later, Hortus became champion of the third class of the major league. A remarkable detail: Wilhelmina Vooruit finished last that season in the same competition with 0 points and a goal difference of 3–93! Hortus won the home game against Wilhelmina Vooruit on 6 April 1919 by a whopping 12–0. Hortus was promoted to the second class, at that time the second highest level of football in the Netherlands. Bobo Lo Brunt, secretary of the Dutch Football Association KNVB, remembered Hortus well. In the anniversary edition marking the 40th anniversary of HEDW in 1953, he wrote: "I remember my first trip to De Meer as if it were yesterday, when I saw where Hortus celebrated its triumphs. In those days, Hortus was a club to be reckoned with, a strong second class team." In the same publication, renowned referee H. Boekman referred to Hortus as´an old club that you don't easily forget´: "One of my first matches at the AVB was at Hortus. Later, there was a Hortus-Rapiditas match on a frighteningly small pitch, but it was enjoyable. I can still see them in front of me, the members of the Moffie family, Aldewereld, and others. The diligent secretary Simon Aldewereld, Duits, and whatever else they may have been called. I can still see them standing there, the excited family members, supporters, neighbours, when one of the hard-hitting smackers himself was treated roughly. How many deaths must I have already suffered when, in my innocence, I awarded an offside goal against Hortus and had to endure those reproachful and deadly glances afterwards." In its first season in the second class, Hortus finished third. It was the highest ranking at that level. In 1923, Hortus was relegated to the third class, where it failed to make an impact. In the 1929–1930 season, Hortus finished last with nine points in eighteen games. Hortus narrowly avoided relegation by winning the promotion/relegation battle against EVC from Edam. As the level of play declined, so did membership numbers. At the time of the merger with E.D.W. in 1931, Hortus had only 35 members left.

Eendracht Doet Winnen (1913–1931) "On November 8 of 1913, we, a group of lanky boys, sat around a simple wooden table and decided to start a football club. Boys, full of illusions and ideals, the privilege of youth.", noted Mau Verdoner, secretary for many years, about the club's origins. The other young lads were Ben Poons, the first chairman, Hijman Hakker, Arie Hondsregt, and treasurer Gerrit Witteboon. Originally, the club was called Eendracht Maakt Macht (meaning unity makes strength). Apparently, they didn't like that name (because it was the motto of PSV Eindhoven, also founded in 1913?), because after only a year, the name was changed to Steeds Voorwaarts (always forward). When the club joined the AVB in 1915, the name had to be changed again because there was already an Amsterdam club with the same name in the AVB. The new name was Eendracht Doet Winnen (unity leads to victory), usually abbreviated to E.D.W. The club was not only involved in football, but also in athletics. The club colours were red and black. The membership list from August 1929 described the 'club uniform' as 'red shirt with black vertical stripe across the chest and back, black shorts, and black socks.' E.D.W. was a distinctly Jewish club with 90 percent Jewish members, mostly ordinary boys from the working and lower middle classes. Politically, they were predominantly left wing. For the first two years, games were played outside of competition on Saturday afternoons, because most players worked on Sundays: "That's when we played our most enjoyable games, usually against different schools, such as Amstelschool, Machinistenschool, H.B.S., etc., and, last but not least, against W.C. (a strange name, but it simply means Weesjongens Combinatie, Orphan's Combination)," as columnist IJsco wrote in 1923 in the club magazine E.D.W.-Nieuws. Initially, these games were played on a sandy pitch on De Lairessestraat under construction. Remarkably, the young association did have its own goalposts. Before every match, they had to be taken to the pitch: "How often did we have to drag our goalposts out of the basement of the ice cream parlor, carry them through the street, dig holes, toil for two hours, only to play a game and then walk back the same way," Verdoner recalled forty years later. According to IJsco, the goalposts were bought for the sum of 4 guilders 50, half a week's wages at the time. The first match on a real grass pitch was a match against A.D.W. (Aanhouden Doet Winnen meaning persistence leads to winning) in 1914 on November 8, to mark the club's first anniversary. E.D.W. won 4–0. A year later, E.D.W. gained access to a grass pitch in Watergraafsmeer and the club was able to make its debut in the third class of the AVB. In its second season E.D.W. became champion and was promoted to the second class. There too, the club immediately became champion as a promoted team and was promoted to the first class. In 1921, ´the first goal of the now grown-up boys´ (Verdoner) was achieved, namely promotion to the third class of the NVB. E.D.W. failed to make an impact there. After eight years, the club was even relegated to the fourth class, which had been created in the meantime. In 1924, E.D.W. moved to a pitch on Kruislaan, next to Ajax. E.D.W. made a name for itself not only sportswise. The club also gained a great reputation in the field of theater, operettas, and revues. The driving force behind this was Gerrit Witteboon, alias Otto Webing. Verdoner wrote in 1948: "People sometimes joked: you are better at partying than playing football. In Otto Webing, we had a man who gradually managed to cultivate a corps of artists. He brought us revues that really made a name for us. For years, he and Bram Rabbie, who took care of the musical part, allowed us to enjoy his artistic productions." Witteboon was also the creator of the popular cheer ´H.O.L.L.A.N.D. Holland spreekt een woordje mee' (Holland does have something to say) on the occasion of the 1928 Olympic Games in Amsterdam. One of E.D.W.'s better football players in the early years was Jaap de Paauw. He played as a left winger in the anniversary match in 1914. IJsco later wrote about him in the club magazine: "Yes, Japie was at his best, driving every defense crazy. His crosses were sublime and, if I remember correctly, he also scored a goal himself. You know, one of those diagonal beauties under the crossbar." At the age of 25, Jaap had to stop playing football because of a badly injured knee. From 1915 until the merger with Hortus in 1931, he was chairman of E.D.W. Because of his great achievements, he was appointed honorary chairman of the new club. During the war, Jaap was active in the resistance. He was arrested by the Germans on November 11, 1943, and murdered in the spring of 1944 ´somewhere in Central Europe´. When E.D.W. joined the NVB, it had 83 playing members. The club usually participated in the competition with five teams. On its tenth anniversary, the club had 90 playing members and 80 non-playing members. In the 1924–1925 season, E.D.W. participated with five senior teams and an 'aspirant team' (youth under 16). The following season, the club even had seven teams: five senior teams, plus a junior team and an aspirant team. There was a high turnover among the members. The 1927 membership list reported no fewer than 44 departing members. Nevertheless, the number of playing members had grown to 101 by 1929. The last membership list dates from August 1930, the year before the merger with Hortus. At that time, the club had 94 members.

HEDW (1931–1956) The clubs merged under the name HEDW. It was more of a takeover. E.D.W. had almost three times as many members as the moribund Hortus (94 compared to 35 members). HEDW took over the club kit from E.D.W. The date of establishment was set at November 8, 1913, the date on which E.D.W. was founded. Ies Rabies was chairman from 1931 to 1946. Mau Verdoner was secretary for the first year after the merger. HEDW moved regularly: it played successively at two locations on Middenweg, on Zuidelijke Wandelweg, on Weesperzijde, and finally at Sportpark Drieburg. HEDW started in the third class of the KNVB (Royal Dutch Football Association) but was relegated to the fourth class after just one year. In 1937, Eddy Hamel, Ajax's wildly popular left winger in the 1920s, was appointed coach. In his second season, HEDW became champions, but failed to gain promotion in the post-season play-offs. A year later, HEDW became champions again. Due to the war, there were no promotion or relegation matches that season. In the last season of 1940–1941, before HEDW was forced by the German occupiers to cease its football activities, HEDW finished second with 26 points, after sixteen games with only one defeat and four draws, normally enough for the championship. However, SDW had two points more. The silver jubilee in 1938 had a dark side due to developments in Hitler's Germany. In addition to the traditional grand revue evening, HEDW played a match against an Old Amsterdam team on 20 November with, in addition to coach Eddy Hamel, former Ajax players goalkeeper Jan de Boer, Henk Anderiesen, Jan de Natris, Piet van Reenen, and Johnny Roeg (from HEDW). The revenue of the match was donated to the Committee for Jewish Refugees. When HEDW was forced to cease its activities in 1941, the board members agreed: "Our work must be continued by the young people who will survive this period." After the war, the club was reestablished 'after much hesitation' (Verdoner). Michel Agsteribbe recalled the meeting at the IJsbreker where the decision was made: "You saw people you hadn't seen in five years. It was a meeting where many people were crying. Many boys were gone. Ninety percent were gone. But we re-established the club anyway." Honorary member Mau Verdoner became the new chairman. Jacques Granaat, then sixteen, joined immediately: "All the boys who were left went to HEDW. That was the club if you were a Jewish boy." Maurits van Thijn was recruited as a member in the concentration camp: "In Auschwitz, I kicked a small stone. Bert Thal saw it and said, 'I see you've played soccer or can play soccer. ' I replied, 'Yes.' He said, 'Well, if we get out of the camp, you'll come and play soccer with us. At HEDW.' I said, 'Yes, I'll come.' I was convinced we wouldn't survive. After the war, I got back in touch with him. He said, 'Do you remember what you promised me? That you would come and play soccer at HEDW.' I said, 'That's right.' He said, 'Come with me right now.' So I signed up." HEDW quickly returned to its pre-war membership levels. When football activities were forced to cease in 1941, the club had 161 members. On April 1, 1946, there were 124. The club started the 1947–1948 season with 173 members. In the years that followed, membership fluctuated between 171 in 1951 and 132 two years later. In the year before the merger with Wilhelmina Vooruit in 1956, the club had 142 members (83 seniors, including honorary members, and 59 juniors). The youth section was doing well at the time. In the 1946–1947 season, HEDW was back in the KNVB fourth class. The first team played there until the merger, although HEDW escaped relegation in 1950 when it had to compete with merger partner Wilhelmina Vooruit for one place in the fourth division (see Wilhelmina Vooruit, 1908–1956). In 1952, HEDW started a very successful baseball division.

WV-HEDW (1956 – present) After a hopeful restart shortly after the war, Wilhelmina Vooruit and HEDW experienced hard times. Membership declined in the 1950s. Both associations lacked leadership. Therefore, in 1956, it was decided to merge, despite some resistance due to differences in background: "Before the war, WV was the Jewish elite, HEDW was the Jewish middle class, and AED (Allen Eén Doel, All For One Goal) was the Jewish 'lower class'. After the war, Wilhelmina Vooruit was still the richer and HEDW the poorer club," according to former member Danny de Paauw, son of Jaap. Another difference was that HEDW, which had a much larger membership (77 to 142),had 59 youth members, while Wilhelmina Vooruit had none. The name became 'Wilhelmina Vooruit united with HEDW', or Wilhelmina Vooruit-HEDW for short, which was soon abbreviated to WV-HEDW. The new club started with 152 senior members and 27 youth members. The first eleven-member board consisted of WV members Martijn Sajet (chairman), Leo van Geuns (secretary), and Willem Melkman (commissioner), alongside HEDW members Mau Verdoner (vice-chairman), Jan Boon (treasurer), and Jaap Rabbie (assistant treasurer). The pitch at Sportpark Voorland became the home base. There, a monument was erected with two memorial stones for the deceased members of both clubs. In addition to sporting activities, WV-HEDW continued the festive tradition of Wilhelmina Vooruit and HEDW. The golden anniversary in 1958 was celebrated in style with a spectacular party, a special anniversary edition of the club magazine 'Onze Revue' with contributions from Prime Minister Willem Drees and other European government leaders, a baseball match against De Volewijckers and a football match against Holland Sporting Club from New York. The first baseball team played at the highest level for several years between 1958 and 1963, in the Dutch Baseball Association's premier league. In 1963, the baseball division went on on its own. The intended goals of the 1956 merger —growth in membership and strengthening of the management team- were not achieved. In 1964, the association had only one junior and two senior teams. The club received a new boost just in time with the arrival of two teams and a handful of staff members from OVVO (Op Volharding Volgt Overwinning, Persistence Is Followed By Victory). In the 1960s, the founders and members of the first hour one after the other stepped down as board membersr. In 1971, WV-HEDW was found to have not only organisational but also severe financial problems. A new board with Harry Polak (chairman), André Lopes Dias (secretary), and Sander Post (treasurer) tackled the problems energetically and laid a solid foundation for a bright future. Sander Post (board member since 1971, chairman from 1978 to 2002, honorary chairman since 2002, died in 2017) and André Lopes Dias (board member from 1962 to 2023, secretary from 1971 to 2022, honorary member since 2006) ensured the necessary continuity in the board. The flagship of WV-HEDW started in the third amateur class of the KNVB in 1956, but was relegated to the fourth class after just one season and two years later even to the AVB. In 1968, it returned to the major league, the KNVB. The euphoria was short-lived. After four years WV-HEDW was relegated again to the first class of the AVB. The next season, WV-HEDW was even relegated to the second class. In 1974, WV-HEDW struck rock bottom when the first team was relegated to absolute 'cellar' of amateur football, the third class of the AVB. In the years to follow the Sunday 1 of WV-HEDW oscillated between the two lowest classes of amateur football. In 1968, WV-HEDW established a Saturday branch, founded under the motto 'for players who play purely for pleasure, Saturday football at WV-HEDW is the way to go'. Initially, the Saturday branch consisted of pub teams. In 1971, the board decided to take matters into its own hands. That, along with the opening of new student flats in Diemen in 1972, paved the way for an influx of students from Brabant, Zeeland, Limburg, Friesland, etc. In 1983, the Saturday 1 team for the first time got its own trainer, the starting point of the gradual but steady rise from the second class AVB to the higher amateur echelons of the KNVB, partly thanks to a strong qualitative boost from Groningen students in the 1990s. In 1991 the Saturday 1 won the title in the first class in an unforgettable decisive match against SDW in Noord: 5–1. Four years later the Sunday 1 reached the national amateur football league KNVB after winning the AVB championship. In ten years time the team rose from the fourth to the first class, where Saturday 1 still plays in the 2025–2026 season after ups and downs. In the years 2007–2009, the team even dropped to the third class. The championship in 2011 opened the road to the top again. Three years later Saturday 1 was back in the first class. In the first post-corona season (2021–2022), the team became champion by a street length and was promoted to the fourth national division . WV-HEDW did well in its first season, finishing in the top half of the table, but unfortunately ended the 2023–2024 season with relegation to the first class where it missed the title and promotion at the end of the 2024–2025 season. The first Sunday team also struggled in the first two decades of the 21st century. For several seasons (2003 to 2007, 2011–2012), the club was unable to field a Sunday 1 team at all. In 2017, a new course was set. Sunday 1 became a transition team for talented youth players from the club who were not yet ready for the high level of the Saturday selection. In just a few years, Sunday 2.0. rose from the fifth to the second class of the KNVB, where it made its debut in the 2024–2025 season. Unfortunately the season ended in relegation, so the team will play the 2025–2026 season in the second class. Since 2022, the U23 has also offered a transfer option for WV-HEDW youth players. In three years time the U23 reached the highest level, the first national division. WV-HEDW has grown thanks to the club's consistent focus on the lower teams under the motto 'the recreational teams matter.' This principle has ensured that WV-HEDW has steadily grown in width since the 1970s. The Sunday division grew from four teams in the 1980–1981 season to eight in 1988–1989. Whereas in the 1982–1983 season there were only five Saturday teams registered, that number had increased to nine in the 1988–1989 season. In the 1996–1997 season, the club had a total of 396 members (Sunday and Saturday) and 24 senior teams: 15 on Saturday, 8 on Sunday, and a veterans' team. Unfortunately, after two successful years (1993–1995), the women's team was no more. The first veterans' team ceased to exist in 1998. In 1997, WV-HEDW had to leave the ground at Sportpark Voorland because housing was planned there. They made the best of a bad situation: the cramped accommodation was exchanged for a beautiful location around the corner with more pitches at Sportpark Middenmeer. The club's now healthy financial situation made it possible to build a beautiful clubhouse. Due to the continued growth in membership, the number of changing rooms has since been increased to 18 and the canteen has been enlarged. On 21 February 2018, De Voorzet was opened, a prominent annex with a changing room, physiotherapy room, storage facilities, and a beautiful reception area for opponents, referees, and other guests. By its centenary, ten years after the move, membership had grown spectacularly to 1,027 members and the club had 34 senior teams: 21 on Saturdays, 12 on Sundays, and one new women's team. Another ten years later, membership had risen to 1,750. In the 2017–2018 season, 93 teams participated in various competitions. With 38 senior teams, WV-HEDW was still the largest senior club in the Netherlands, but the main growth took place among youth and girls/women. The number of youth teams had risen to 51, including three teams at division level. The number of girls and women playing soccer at the club rose from 70 in 2008 to 200 in 2018: 4 senior teams, 6 girls' teams, and mini's. After WV-HEDW got a women's team again in 2006, which started playing in the fifth class on Sundays, the foundation for the current Saturday selection was laid in 2014 when the talented MA1 (GirlsA1) made the transition to the seniors. As women's 1 on Saturdays, the girls became champions of the fourth class in their first season. In 2025, the women's first Saturday team plays in the first class. Women's 2 plays one class below. In addition, there are two other women's teams playing on Saturdays, one 30+ team on Fridays, and three teams on Sundays. WV-HEDW also welcomed youth players for the first time since 1974. On May 10, 2000, the first open day was held for football players born between 1990 and 1994. In September, two boys' teams and one girls' team started competing in the league. In the years that followed, the youth branch grew rapidly, thanks in part to the efforts of parents who trained their children's teams, refereed, coached, and transported them to away games. By its centenary, WV-HEDW had 19 youth teams participating in the competition, plus a large group of minis who played in their own competition. By its 110th anniversary, the youth department had grown from 400 to 770 players. The youth division also made a qualitative leap forward by employing players from selection teams as trained coaches. In 2025, WV-HEDW ranks 14th on the list of best performing football youth teams in the Netherlands. The centenary of WV-HEDW in 2008 was celebrated in style. On May 4, the celebrations were fittingly opened with a special commemoration of the members of Wilhelmina Vooruit and HEDW who were murdered during the Second World War. The following weekends saw the International Friendship Tournament and the Hette Spoelstra Youth Tournament took place. The month of celebrations ended with a weekend full of festivities: the big party on Friday evening in the Koningszaal of Artis (where the 60th anniversary was celebrated in 1968) with the presentation of the three-part anniversary book, anniversary matches on Saturday, and a reunion on Sunday presented by national celebrity Dieuwertje Blok. On that occasion, Her Majesty graciously appointed honorary chairman Sander Post and honorary member André Lopes Dias as Members of the Order of Orange-Nassau. The next milestone, the club's 110th anniversary, was also celebrated exuberantly on Ascension Day, 10 May 2018, with football matches for young and old, the presentation of the anniversary book covering what happened to the club in the last ten years (2008–2018), a reunion, the Sander Post Festival with acts from within the club's own ranks, and a closing party with a DJ.

Monument in memory of the Jewish members of Wilhelmina Vooruit and HEDW who were murdered during World War II

Wilhelmina Vooruit and HEDW were football clubs with a large number of Jewish members. In 1940, 45 percent of Wilhelmina Vooruit's membership was Jewish, while at HEDW it was 95 percent. When the German occupiers banned Jews from sports grounds in the fall of 1941, Wilhelmina Vooruit had 73 members. The much larger HEDW had 161. The monument bears the names of members and former members of both clubs who were murdered during the war: • Wilhelmina Vooruit: 79 members • HEDW: 183 members Among them were 14 youth members (< 20 years old) of Wilhelmina Vooruit (the youngest was 14) and 75 youth members of HEDW (the youngest was 13). At the time, you could only become a member if you were 12 years old. After World War II, both clubs erected a memorial stone at their former locations. Wilhelmina Vooruit placed a memorial with the names of the victims at Sportpark Voorland, while HEDW placed a collective plaque at Sportpark Drieburg. After the merger in 1956, the memorial stones were combined into a stone monument next to the WV-HEDW field at Sportpark Voorland (about 300 meters east of the current location, where a residential area now stands). When WV-HEDW moved to its location at Sportpark Middenmeer in 1998, the members were determined: the monument had to be moved as well. The two memorial stones were then placed on a new stone wall. Two glass plates were also added, one of which bears the names of the murdered HEDW members, which were not included on the original monument. In 2019, WV-HEDW expanded its accommodation. This required the monument to be moved ten meters to its current location. The wall from 1998 was replaced by a metal back wall, and the memorial stones, which had been damaged over the years, were reinforced.

Every year on May 4, the day that the Dutch commemorate the people that were killed during World War II, members, family members and persons interested gather at the club to bring flowers, listen to speeches and for a two-minute silence in honor of the members of HEDW and WV who were murdered during the war. During the covid pandemic the commemoration was held online. In 2022 a physical commemoration was allowed again. The commemoration of 2024 generated great interest because of the unveiling of two side panels with 33 names of club members, 12 of Wilhelmina Vooruit and 21 of HEDW, yet unknown to have been murdered during World War II. The new names were traced by the Historical Committee of the club. Starting point of its quest was the research of sport historians Jurryt van de Vooren and Joris Kaper, who gathered the names of nearly 3,000 deadly football victims of the war on website voetbalmonument.nl (football monument).

In 2008 the monument was adopted by the elementary Dalton school De Meer. Every year pupils of the school visit WV-HEDW and the monument in the week before May 4 as part of the lessons about World War II.

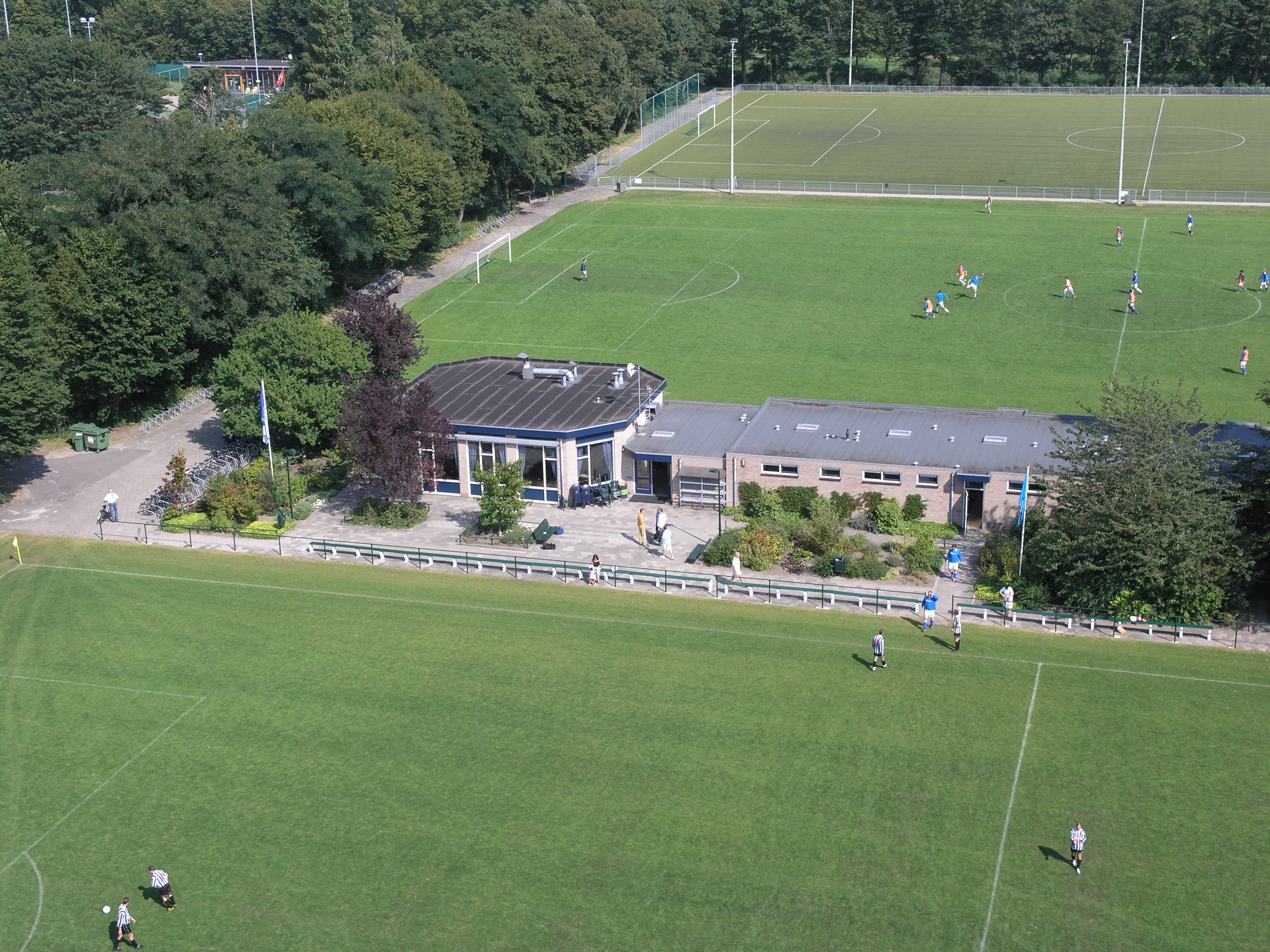
The club's ground in Sportpark Middenmeer, Amsterdam

== Notable players ==
- Jan van Diepenbeek
- Cor van der Hoeven
- Johnny Roeg
- Johnny Schaap
- Nico Engelander
- Nico Jonker
- Ibrahim El Kadiri
- Mark Sifneos
- Lily Yohanes
- Liv Rademaker
