= Feri =

Feri may refer to:

- Attila Feri (born 1968), Romanian weightlifter
- Dominik Feri, Czech politician
- Yvonne Feri (born 1966), Swiss politician
- Feri Tradition, an initiatory tradition of modern Pagan witchcraft
- Federico Errazuriz Regional Institute

== See also ==
- Ferri, surname
- Fery, surname
