= Felix Rawitscher =

German botanist

Felix Kurt Rawitscher (January 4, 1890 – December 18, 1957) was a German botanist and professor. A member of the Brazilian Academy of Sciences, he helped establish the Department of Botany at the Faculty of Philosophy, Sciences and Languages of the University of São Paulo, now part of the Institute of Biosciences.

== Biography ==
=== Early life and education ===
Born in Frankfurt into a Jewish family, Rawitscher was the son of Ludwig Rawitscher, a judge, and Anna Rawitscher. In 1906, he completed his secondary education at Kaiser Friedrichs Gymnasium, enrolling the same year at the University of Bonn, where he was trained in natural history. He later attended the Universities of Freiburg and Geneva, where he studied under the botanists Eduard Strasburger, Robert Hippolyte Chodat, Hans Kniep, Friedrich Oltmanns, and Martin Möbius, the zoologists August Weismann and Alfred Kühn, as well as the chemist Ludwig Gattermann and the mineralogist Carl Alfred Osann.

=== Career ===
In 1912, at the University of Freiburg, Rawitscher defended his doctoral thesis on the reproduction of Ustilaginales, describing the process of dikaryotic nuclear pairing in Basidiomycota. He then worked as an apprentice at Wilhelm Pfeiffer's institute in Leipzig, where he dedicated himself to plant physiology. While working as an assistant to Friedrich Oltmanns, he specialized in the study of algae.

Rawitscher's academic career was interrupted with the outbreak of World War I, during which he served on the frontlines at the Battle of the Somme and at Verdun, where he was injured and captured by the French Army. While recovering, he read philosophers such as Henri Bergson and Heinrich Rickert, as well as Charles Darwin's On the Origin of Species.

After the War, he published works on fungi, nastic movements, and gravitropism, and was appointed as a professor at the University of Freibug. In the early 1930s, Adolf Hitler's rise to power led him to accept Teodoro Ramos's invitation to work at the newly established University of São Paulo, which at the time was hiring French, German, Portuguese, and Italian professors and academics.

==== Activity in Brazil ====
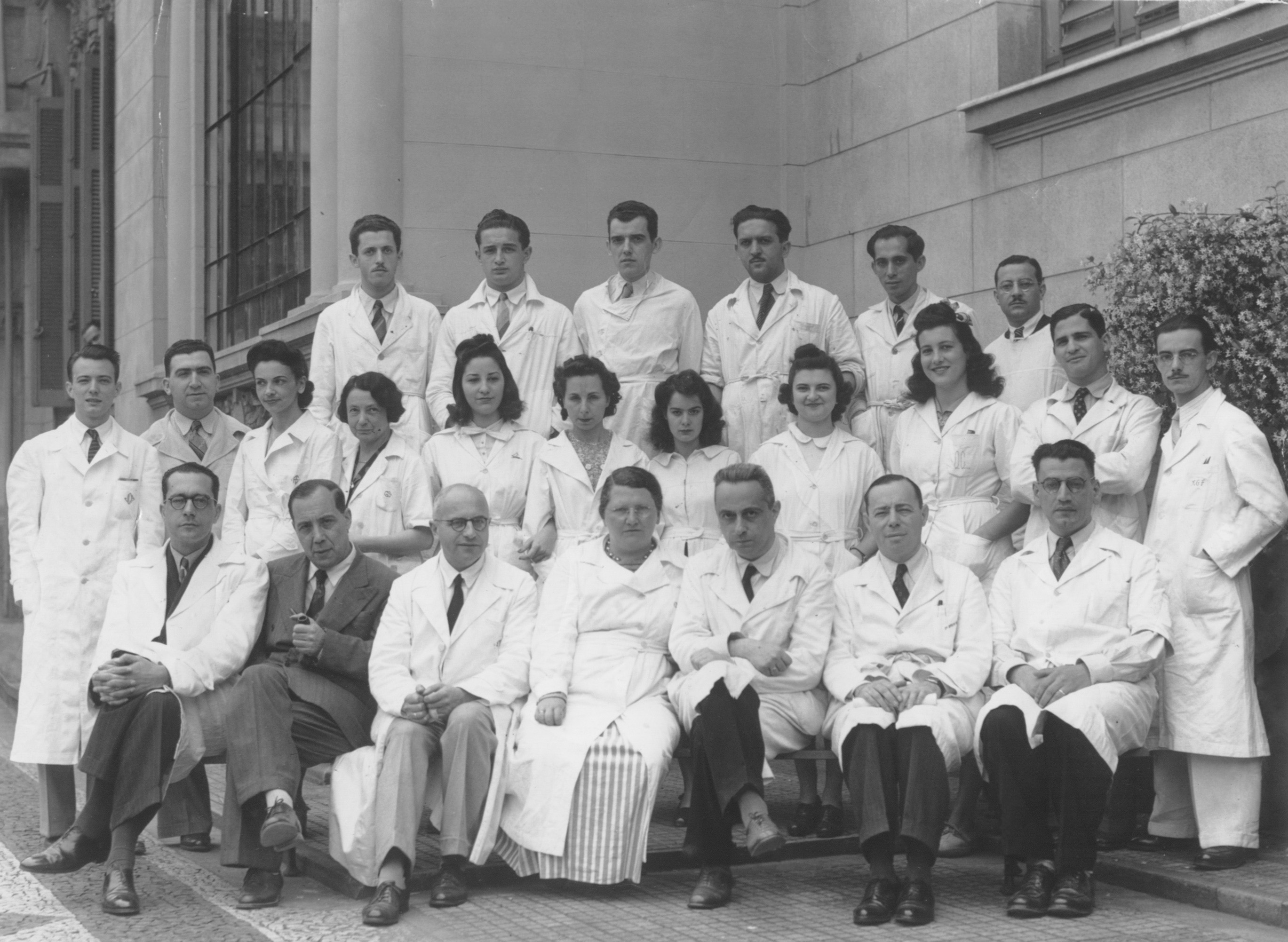
c. 1943. Rawitscher is the third person seated from the left

In June 30, 1934, Rawistcher arrived in Brazil accompanied by the zoologist Ernst Bresslau and the chemist Heinrich Rheinboldt. He soon began implementing reforms to the Department of Botany, then located at the facility of the Faculty of Medicine. He hired assistants and the horticulturist Georg Seyfried, who established a research garden, and introduced seminars bringing together students, professors, and postdoctorate alumni, who shared and discussed their research.

Rawitscher taught theoretical and experimental classes, the latter more extensive and detailed. In 1937, he launched the scientific journal Boletim de Botânica and served as its editor. In 1940, he prepared the didatic book Introdução ao Estudo da Botânica. Together with Mário Guimarães Ferri and Mercedes Rachid, he published the first work on phytoecology in Brazil, titled Profundidade dos solos e vegetação em campos cerrados do Brasil Meridional. Among his students were mycologist Berta Lange de Morretes the phycologist Aílton Brandão Joly.

After suffering a heart attack, he moved back to Germany in 1952. On 29 November 1955, he received the title of doctor honoris causa from the University of São Paulo.

=== Personal life and legacy ===
Rawitscher was married to Carlota Oberlaender, with whom he had the botanist Erika Rawitscher and the physicist Georg Heinrich Rawitscher. He died on 18 December 1957, in Freiburg, due to pulmonary embolism. The building where classes are held at the Institute of Biosciences of the University of São Paulo is named in his honor.
