= Jan van Diepenbeek =

Dutch footballer (1903–1981)

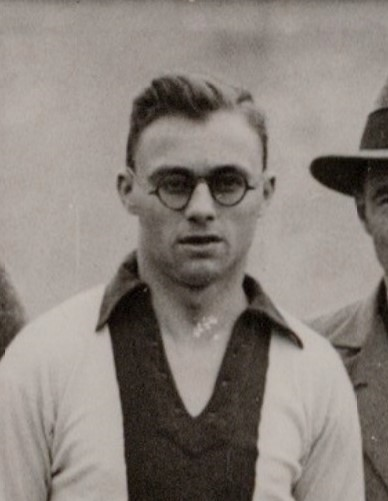

Personal information
- Full name: Jan Antonie van Diepenbeek
- Date of birth: 5 August 1903
- Place of birth: Uitgeest, Netherlands
- Date of death: 8 August 1981 (aged 78)
- Place of death: Den Helder, Netherlands
- Position: Rightback

Youth career
- 1915-1926: Wilhelmina Vooruit

Senior career*
Years	Team	Apps	(Gls)
1926–1938	Ajax	207	(8)
- WV HEDW

International career
1933–1935	Netherlands	4	(0)
- * Club domestic league appearances and goals

Jan Antonie van Diepenbeek (5 August 1903 – 8 August 1981) was a Dutch international footballer who played for Ajax, HEDW and Wilhelmina Vooruit. He represented the Netherlands national football team at the 1934 FIFA World Cup, but did not play a game.

== Club career ==
Born in Uitgeest, he moved to Amsterdam with his parents when he was only a toddler. The bespectacled Van Diepenbeek played 207 matches for Ajax between 1929 and 1938, before joining Wilhelmina Vooruit and its successor WV-HEDW.

== International career ==
Van Diepenbeek made his debut for the Netherlands in a December 1933 friendly match against Austria and earned a total of 4 caps, scoring no goals. His final international was a February 1935 friendly against Germany.
