= Ferry Island Provincial Park =

Provincial park in British Columbia, Canada

- IUCN category II (national park)
- Location within British Columbia Location within Fraser Valley Regional District
- Interactive map of Ferry Island Provincial Park
- Location: Fraser Valley, British Columbia, Canada
- Nearest city: Rosedale
- Coordinates: 49°12′16″N 121°46′51″W
- Area: 29 ha (72 acres)
- Designation: Class C Provincial Park
- Established: October 3, 1963
- Governing body: BC Parks

Ferry Island Provincial Park is a Class C provincial park in British Columbia that is located on the south side of the Fraser River northeast of Rosedale. This park is northwest of Bridal Falls, British Columbia and adjacent to the Agassiz-Rosedale Bridge. The Ferry Island Park was established in 1963, and it has an area of about 29 hectares.

Ferry Island Provincial Park is listed as a "Class C" provincial park which is governed by a local community board.
