= James Ferry =

James or Jim Ferry may refer to:

- James Ferry (priest), priest of the Anglican Church of Canada
- James Ferry (footballer), English footballer
- Jim Ferry (born 1967), American college basketball coach
