= Percy Lovett =

English footballer

Personal information
- Full name: Percival Reginald Lovett
- Date of birth: 1 August 1921
- Place of birth: Shrewsbury, Shropshire, England
- Date of death: 1982 (aged 60–61)
- Place of death: Shrewsbury, Shropshire, England
- Position: Goalkeeper

Youth career
- Kenwood Juniors
- Everton

Senior career*
Years	Team	Apps	(Gls)
1938–1939	Everton	0	(0)
1947	Wrexham	13	(0)
- Hereford United
- * Club domestic league appearances and goals

Percival Reginald Lovett (1 August 1921 – 1982) was an English professional footballer who played as a goalkeeper. He made 13 appearances in the English Football League for Wrexham in 1947.

He also played non-league football for Hereford United.
