= Harpers Ferry (disambiguation) =

Harpers Ferry is the name of several places in the United States of America:

- Harpers Ferry, Iowa, a city in Allamakee County, Iowa
- Harpers Ferry, West Virginia, a town in Jefferson County, West Virginia
  - John Brown's raid on Harpers Ferry (1859)
  - Harpers Ferry Armory, second federal armory (construction begun 1799) and site of John Brown's slave revolt of 1859
  - Harpers Ferry National Historical Park
  - Battle of Harpers Ferry (September 12–15, 1862), a battle in the American Civil War that took place around what is now Harpers Ferry, West Virginia
  - Harpers Ferry station, Amtrak station located in Harpers Ferry

Harpers Ferry may also refer to:

- Harpers Ferry class dock landing ship, a ship class in the United States Navy
  - USS Harpers Ferry (LSD-49), a Harpers Ferry class dock landing ship of the United States Navy, commissioned in 1995
- Harpers Ferry (nightclub), a music venue and nightclub in Boston
- Harper's Ferry flintlock pistol

== See also ==
- Harpur's Ferry, A student volunteer ambulance service in Binghamton University
