= Alibée Féry =

Général Alibée Féry (28 May 1818 - 1896) was a Haitian playwright, poet, and storyteller. Born in Jérémie, Féry was largely self-taught. He was the first person to tell stories of Uncle Bouqui and Ti Malice, characters who appear frequently in Haitian folklore.

== Selected works ==
- Essais Littéraires (play)
- Fils du Chasseur (story)
- Les Bluettes (poems)
- Les Echantillons (stories)
- Les Esquisses (historical stories)
