= Wilf Chisholm =

English footballer

Personal information
- Full name: Wilfred Chisholm
- Date of birth: 23 May 1921
- Place of birth: Hebburn, England
- Date of death: 1962 (aged 40–41)
- Position: Goalkeeper

Senior career*
Years	Team	Apps	(Gls)
1945–1946	Newcastle United	0	(0)
1946–1951	Grimsby Town	92	(0)
1951–195?	Spennymoor United		
- * Club domestic league appearances and goals

Wilfred Chisholm (23 May 1921 – 1962) was an English professional footballer who played as a goalkeeper.
