= Cor van der Hoeven =

Dutch footballer

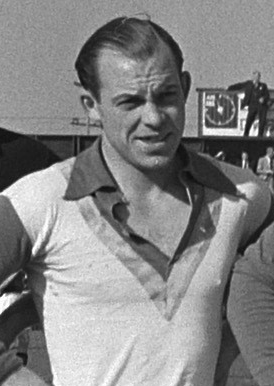
- Cor van der Hoeven (1947)

Personal information
- Full name: Cornelis van der Hoeven
- Date of birth: 12 May 1921
- Place of birth: Amsterdam, Netherlands
- Date of death: 1 February 2017 (aged 95)
- Place of death: Amsterdam, Netherlands
- Position: Defender

Youth career
- 1932-1938: DWS

Senior career*
| Years | Team | Apps | (Gls) |
| 1938–1948 | DWS | 94 | (12) |
| 1948–1951 | Ajax | 42 | (4) |
| 1951–1953 | Wilhelmina Vooruit | | |
| 1948–1951 | VSV | 1 | (1) |

International career
| 1950 | Netherlands | 3 | (0) |
- * Club domestic league appearances and goals

Cornelis "Cor" van der Hoeven (12 May 1921 – 1 February 2017) was a Dutch footballer. He played as a midfielder for DWS and Ajax. He also made three appearances with the national team.

Born in Amsterdam, van der Hoeven played 52 official games for Ajax after spending 10 years with DWS. Known for his speed and his reading of the game, he later played for Wilhelmina Vooruit.

Van der Hoeven died on 1 February 2017 in Amsterdam at the age of 95.
