= Mário Guimarães Ferri =

- Born: 1918; São José dos Campos, SP
- Died: 15 June 1985 (aged 66–67); São Paulo, SP
- Occupations: Brazilian scientist (Botany and Ecology)

Mario Guimarães Ferri (1918 in São José dos Campos, SP – 15 June 1985 in São Paulo, SP) was a professor at the University of São Paulo (USP). He was a research scientist, a lecturer, an editor, an administrator and also an artist. In his scientific work, he was a pioneer ecologist in Brazil. His books and articles on science intended to inform the public about ecology and pollution in a simple but precise language, with which he presented data to understand his perceived importance of the protection of the environment.

== Biography ==
Mario Guimarães Ferri married Ruth Lippi Ferri in 1941. He made his primary studies in São José dos Campos, and his secondary studies were in the city of São Paulo at the Instituto de Educação Caetano de Campos. In 1935, he became a teacher for primary and secondary schools. He became a science graduate at the Faculdade de Filosofia, Ciências e Letras da Universidade de São Paulo (FFCLUSP). He was the first collaborator of Professor Felix Rawitscher, who had organized the Department of Botany in the FFCLUSP. He obtained his PhD at USP in 1944 and a Livre-Docencia (fully tenured) in 1951. In 1955, he got the position of Full Professor of Botany at the Faculdade de Filosofia, Ciências e Letras. He undertook scientific research in Botany and in Ecology. In Botany, he did pioneer work in Brazil with phytohormones, mainly auxins, and succeeded in raising interest in this subject.

All his articles published between 1945 and 1951 deal with phytohormones. His interest in the area was a consequence of his studies in plant physiology in the USA – where with the aid of a grant from the Rockefeller Foundation, he was able to work at the Boyce Thompson Institute for Plant Research, at Columbia University, and at the California Institute of Technology. In the area of Tropical Ecology, he was responsible for the formation of several students. He was one of the founder members of the Academia de Ciências do Estado de São Paulo, the only one from the area of Botany. He was also very active in directing the USP Publishing House (EDUSP), where he courageously promoted at that time the publication of scientific books in Portuguese by Brazilian scientists. He was the supervisor of twenty PhD students. Ferri is also known as an artist of finearts, and he started producing his drawings in 1961.

== Work positions ==
He was a Lecturer, a Full Professor and Head of the Department of Botany of the Instituto of Biociencias, USP. From 1961 to 1968, he was the Director of the Faculdade de Filosofia, Ciências e Letras, and for five years he was Vice-Principal of USP, then Principal in 1967 and 1968. From 1961 to 1968, he was a Member of the Advisory Board of USP. For a number of years, starting in 1964, he was the President of the Editorial Board of USP and during his period 1806 books were published in collaboration with several publishing houses, in several fields of knowledge. He was also a referee for several scientific journals in Brazil and outside Brazil.

== Prizes ==
- Professor Emeritus, USP (1975)
- Honorary Member of the Associação Brasileira de Arquitetos Paisagistas (1975)
- Honours medals of the Inconfidência Mineira, from the State of Minas Gerais Government (1977 and 1981)
- Santos Dumont Mérito Aeronáutico, Gold Grade (1981)
- Honorary Citizen of the State of Minas Gerais (1974)
- Member of the Instituto de Cultura Hispânica (1961)
- Member of the Instituto de Geografia de Portugal (1961)

== Artist of finearts ==
Ferri took part in group and individual exhibitions in several Brazilian States:

- 9th São Paulo Bienal (1976)
- Associação dos Amigos do Museu de Arte Moderna de São Paulo (1968)
- 1st Salão Paulista de Arte Contemporânea
- 1st Pré-Bienal de Artes Plásticas
- His last exhibition was a retrospective of his Works in the Galeria Ibero-Americana de Arte, in São Paulo, between 17 November and 15 December 1983 – at which 165 of his works were presented, ranging over the period 1961 and 1983,

== PhD Thesis ==
- Transpiração de plantas permanentes do cerrado. (in Portuguese)

== Tese de Cátedra ("full professor thesis") ==
- Contribuição ao conhecimento da ecologia do cerrado e da caatinga. Estudo comparativo da economia d'água de sua vegetação. (in Portuguese)

== Pioneer in Ecology ==
He pioneered field work in Plant Ecology in Brazil. His PhD thesis was one of the first scientific works of an experimental nature in the study of the ecology of the vegetation of the cerrados. The first work in experimental field ecology in Brazil is a collaboration he undertook with Felix Rawitscher and Mercedes Rachid – Profundidade dos solos e vegetação dos cerrados do Brasil Meridional.(in Portuguese);

== Publications ==
- Ferri, M. G., 1938. Sobre a função dos hidropôtios. An. la. Reunião Sul-americana de Botânica, vol. I.
- Ferri, M. G., 1942. Observação sobre a metodologia para o estudo da transpiração cuticular em plantas brasileiras, especialmente em Cedrela fissilis. Bolm Fac. Fil. Ciên. Letras USP 28, Bot. 3.
- Ferri, M. G., 1943. Observações sobre a Lagoa Santa. Ceres 4.
- Ferri, M. G., 1943. Profundidade dos solos e vegetação em campos cerrados do Brasil Meridional. An. Acad. Brasil. Ciênc. 15.
- Ferri, M. G., 1944. Transpiração de plantas permanentes dos cerrados. Bolm Fac. Ciênc. Letras USP 41. Bot. 4.
- Ferri, M. G., 1945. Preliminary observations on the translocation of synthetic growth substances. Contrib. Boyce Thompson Inst. 14.
- Ferri, M. G., 1946. Pesquisas recentes de alcance prático sobre hormônios de crescimento. Rev. Soc. Rural Brasil S. Paulo 26, nº 306.
- Ferri, M. G., 1946. Informações sobre o estado atual das pesquisas sobre hormônios de crescimento. Rev. Soe. Rural Brasil. S.Paulo 26, n° 306.
- Ferri, M. G., 1947. The enzymatic conversion of tryptophan to auxin by spinach leaves. Arch. Biochem. 13.
- Ferri, M. G., 1948. Partenocarpia induzida com ácido-β-naftoxiacético. Bolm Fac. Fil. Ciênc. Letras, USP 91, Bot. 6.
- Ferri, M. G., 1948. Stomatal behaviour as influenced by treatment with naphtoxyacetic acid. Contrib. Boyce Thompson Inst. 15.
- Ferri, M. G., 1949. Hormônios e substâncias sintéticas promotoras ou reguladoras do crescimento das plantas. Ciência & Cult. 1.
- Ferri, M. G., 1949. Further information on the stomatal behaviour as influenced by treatment with hormone-like substances. An. Acad. brasil. Ciênc.21.
- Ferri, M. G., 1950. Síntese, natureza química, modo de ação e inativação dos fitohormônios. Rodriguesia 24.
- Ferri, M. G., 1950. Riboflavina e fototropismo das articulações das folhas de feijão. Ciência & Cult. 3.
- Ferri, M. G., 1950. Influence of growth substances on the pulvini of the primary leaves of bean plants. An. Acad. brasil. Ciênc. 22.
- Ferri, M. G., 1951. Fluorescence and photoinactivation of indoleacetic acid. Arch. Biochem. & Byophys. 31.
- Ferri, M. G., 1951. Nuevas informaciones sobre la influencia de substancias de crescimento en el movimento de las articulaciones de las hojas primarias de Phaseolus vulgaris L. Phyton 1.
- Ferri, M. G., 1951. Fotodestruição do fitohormônio ácido indolil-3-acético por compostos fluorescentes. Bolm Fac. Ciênc. Letras USP 102, Bot. 9.
- Ferri, M. G., 1951. Photoinactivation of the plant-hormone indoleacetic acid by fluorescent substances. Nature 4269.
- Ferri, M. G., 1952. Water balance of plants from the "Caatinga". I. Transpiration of some of the most frequent species of the Caatinga of Paulo Afonso (Bahia) in the rainy season. Revta bras. Biol. 12.
- Ferri, M. G., 1952. O caminho do carbono na fotossintese: XIV. Tradução do trabalho de Melvin, G., J.A. Bassham, A.A. Benson, S. Kawaguchi, V.H. Linch, W. Stepka e N.E. Robert. Selecta Chimica 10.
- Ferri, M. G., 1953. Observações sobre a influência de compostos fluorescentes no crescimento de fungos. Revta bras. Biol. 13.
- Ferri, M. G., 1953. Balanço de água de plantas da caatinga. An. 4º Congr. Nac. Soc. Bot. do Brasil.
- Ferri, M. G., 1953. Mecanismo do efeito de substancias de crescimento sobre o movimento de folhas de feijão (nota preliminar). An. 4º Congr. Nac. Soe. Bot. do Brasil.
- Ferri, M. G., 1953. Como florescem as plantas. Ciência & Cult. 5.
- Ferri, M. G., 1953. Water balance of plants from the "Caatinga". II. Further information on transpiration and stomatal behaviour. Revta bras. Biol.13.
- Ferri, M. G., 1954. A Botânica em São Paulo, desde a criação de sua Universidade. Jornal O Estado de S. Paulo", nº 24.145.
- Ferri, M. G., 1954. Transpiração de Eucalyptus tereticornis. Bolm Fac. Fil. Ciênc. Letras USP 173, Bot. 11.
- Ferri, M. G., 1954. On the morphology of the stomata of Eucalyptus terticornis, Ouratea spectabilis and Cedrela fissilis. Bolm Fac. Ciênc. Letras USP 173. Bot.11.
- Ferri, M. G., 1954. Observações sobre a influência de compostos fluorescentes no enraizamento de estacas. I. Revta bras. Biol. 14.
- Ferri, M. G., 1954. Water balance of the "caatinga", a semiarid type of vegetation of Northern Brazil. Compt. Rendus. VIII Congr. Internat. Bot., Paris.
- Ferri, M. G., 1955. A Botânica no Brasil—Capitulo X, Vol. I da obra "As Ciências no Brasil". Cia. Melhoramentos de Sào Paulo.
- Ferri, M. G., 1955. Problemas de reflorestamento da caatinga e do cerrado. Ciência & Cult. 7.
- Ferri, M. G., 1955. Contribuição ao conhecimento da ecologia do cerrado e da caatinga. Estudo comparativo da economia d'água de sua vegetação. Bolm Fac. Fil. Ciênc. Letras USP 195. Bot. 12.
- Ferri, M. G., 1955. Observações sobre a influência de compostos fluorescentes no enraizamento de estacas II. Revta Biol.15.
- Ferri, M. G., 1956. Botânica – Morfologia externa das plantas (Organografia). Cia. Melhoramentos de São Paulo.
- Ferri, M. G., 1956. Transpiração de plantas permanentes do cerrado na estação das chuvas. Revta bras. Biol.16.
- Ferri, M. G., 1956. Economia d'água de cana-de-açúcar. An. Acad. brasil. Ciênc. 28.
- Ferri, M. G., 1957. Photoactive movement of the stomata of sugarcane. Revta bras. Biol. 17.
- Ferri, M. G., 1957. Informações sobre a transpiração de duas gramíneas freqüentes no cerrado. Revta bras. Biol.17.
- Ferri, M. G., 1957. O consumo d'água dos eucaliptos. An. Acad. Brasil. Econ. Florest. 9.
- Ferri, M. G., 1958. In Memoriam: Felix Rawitscher. Bolm Fac. Fil. Ciênc. Letras USP 224. Bot. 15.
- Ferri, M. G., 1958. Contribuição ao conhecimento da ecologia do cerrado. Estudo comparativo da economia d'água de sua vegetação em Emas (Est. de São Paulo), Campo Grande (Est. de Mato Grosso) e Goiania (Est. Goiás). Bolm Fac. Fil. Ciênc. Letras USP 224. Bot. 15
- Ferri, M. G., 1958. Papel do fator nutricional na economia de água de plantas do cerrado. Revta Biol. 1.
- Ferri, M. G., 1958. A botânica em São Paulo desde a criação de sua Universidade. Ensaios Paulistas, 9–23 Editora Anhambi. São Paulo.
- Ferri, M. G., 1959. Contribuição ao estudo da anatomia das folhas de plantas do cerrado. Bolm Fac. Fil. Ciênc. Letras USP 243. Bot. 16.
- Ferri, M. G., 1959. Ecological information on the "Rio Negro Caatinga" (Amazon) IX Internat. Congress. Montreal, Canada, Proceed. vol. Il. Abstr. 12–13.
- Ferri, M. G., 1959. Problems of water relations of some Brazilian vegetation types with special consideration of the concept of xeromorphy and xerophytism. UNESCO – Simpósio: Ecologia de regiões áridas e semiáridas, Madrid, set..
- Ferri, M. G., 1959. Aspects of the soil-water-plant relationship in connexion with some Brazilian types of vegetation. UNESCO – Simpósio: Ecologia de regiões tropicais úmidas, Abidjan, out..
- Ferri, M. G., 1959. Caracterização das principais formações vegetais brasileiras. An. Soc. Bot. Brasil, Fortaleza, Ceará.
- Ferri, M. G., 1959. Informações sobre a influência do N-fenil carbamato de isopropila no comportamento de diversas plantas – (nota prévia). An. Soe. Bot. Brasil, Fortaleza, Ceará.
- Ferri, M. G., 1960. Nota preliminar sobre a vegetação de cerrado em Campo Mourão (Paraná). Bolm Fac. Fil. Ciênc. Letras USP 247. Bot.17.
- Ferri, M. G., 1960. Transpiração e comportamento estomático de plantas permanentes do cerrado em Campo do Mourão (Paraná). Bolm Fac. Fil. Ciênc. Letras, USP 247. Bot. 17.
- Ferri, M. G., 1960. Informações sobre a economia d'água de plantas de um tabuleiro do município de Goiana (Pernambuco). Bolm Fac. Fil. Ciênc. Letras USP 247. Bot.17.
- Ferri, M. G., 1960. Contribution to the knowledge of the ecology of the "Rio Negro Caatinga". (Amazon). Bull. Research Council of Israel, Sec. D. Botany, vol. 89 Apr. nº 34.
- Ferri, M. G., 1960. Considerações sobre o ensino da Botânica. XXII Reunião da Soc. Brasileira para o Progresso da Ciência (Piracicaba).
- Ferri, M. G., 1961. Informações sobre a influência do N-fenil carbamato de isopropila no comportamento de a1gumas plantas, com especial consideração da transpiração. Revta Biol. 2.
- Ferri, M. G., 1961. Problems of water relations of some Brazilian vegetation types with special consideration of the concepts of xeromorphy and xerophytism. Plant-water relationship in arid conditions. Madrid symposium: 24–30, September 1959, UNESCO.
- Ferri, M. G., 1961. Aspects of the soil-water-plant relationship in connexion with some Brazilian types of vegetation. Tropical soil and vegetation. Proceed. of the Abidjan Symposium: 20- 24, October 1959, UNESCO.
- Ferri, M. G., 1961. Caracterização das principais formações vegetais brasileiras e considerações sobre alguns problemas importantes de sua ecologia. (V Curso Internac. Pastagens, 15-6 a 7-8-59, São Paulo). Fundamentos de manejo de pastagens. Departamento de Produção Animal, Sec. Agric. São Paulo: 177–188.
- Ferri, M. G., 1961. Problemas de economia d'água na vegetacão de caatinga e cerrados brasileiros. (V Curso Internac. Pastagens, 15-6 a 7-8-59, São Paulo). Fundamentos de manejo de pastagens. Departamento de Produção Animal, Sec. Agric. São Paulo: 189–199.
- Ferri, M. G., 1963. Histórico dos trabalhos botânicos sobre o cerrado. Simpósio sobre o cerrado. EDUSP.
- Ferri, M. G., 1963. Evolução do conceito de xerofitismo Bolm Fac. Fi1. Ciênc. Letras USP 267, Bot. 19.
- Ferri, M. G., 1964. Discurso do diretor Prof. Mário Guimarães Ferri no encerramento da solenidade de colação de grau de Bacharéis e Licenciados da Turma de 1963. Publ. Fac. Fil. Ciênc. Letras, USP.
- Ferri, M. G., 1964. Informações sobre a ecologia dos cerrados e sobre a possibilidade de seu aproveitamento. Silvicultura (Ver. Téc. Serv. Flor. Est. São Paulo) Ano 3, n°. 3.
- Ferri, M. G., 1968. Idéias sobre a reestruturação da Universidade de São Paulo. Jornal O Estado de S. Paulo.
- Ferri, M. G., 1968. USP – Reestruturação e adequação às necessidades do momento. Suplemento Especial de Educação, Folha de S.Paulo, 76–77.
- Ferri, M. G., 1969. Plantas do Brasil – Espécies do Cerrado. Ed. Edgard Blücher Ltda e EDUSP.
- Ferri, M. G., 1969. Glossário de termos botânicos. Ed. Edgard Blücher e EDUSP.
- Ferri, M. G., 1970. Botânica—Morfologia interna das plantas (Anatomia) Cia. Melhoramentos de São Paulo e EDUSP. 1ª Edicão. São Paulo.
- Ferri, M. G., 1970. Aspectos da vegetação do sul do Brasil. De R.V. Wettstein, supervisão. Ed. Edgard Blücher e EDUSP.
- Ferri, M. G., 1971. Simpósio sobre o cerrado – I – Reimpressão. Ed. Edgard Blücher e EDUSP.
- Ferri, M. G., 1971. Modificação do hábito floral de Cochlospermum regium (Mart) Pilger. III Simpósio sobre o cerrado. Coord. M.G. Ferri. Ed. Edgard Blücher e EDUSP.
- Ferri, M. G., 1971. Efeitos de substancias de crescimento no movimento das articulações de Phaseolus vulgaris. Ciência & Cult. 23.
- Ferri, M. G., 1971. Informações sobre transpiraração e anatomia foliar de diversas mirtáceas. Ciência & Cult.23.
- Ferri, M. G., 1971. III Simpósio sobre o cerrado. Ed. Edgard Blücher e EDUSP.
- Ferri, M. G., 1972. Ecological problems of tho cerrado vegetation. I. Congresso Latinoamericano de Botânica, pp. 365–387. In Memórias de Simposia. México.
- Ferri, M. G., 1972. Contribuição ao conhecimento da anatomia de plantas de uma caatinga do Rio Negro (Amazonas). Revta Biol. 8.
- Ferri, M. G., 1972. Editoração: conceitos e perspectivas. pp. 11–18 in Editoração na USP. Depto de Jornalismo e Editoração da Escola de Comunicações e Artes da USP.
- Ferri, M. G., 1973. Sobre a origem, manutenção e transformação dos cerrados. Actas de la Asociación Argentina de Ecologia. l.
- Ferri, M. G., 1972. Homem agride o ambiente no país. Jornal O Estado de S. Paulo, 11/02/73.
- Ferri, M. G., 1972. Lagoa Santa e a vegetação dos cerrados brasileiros. Livraria Itatiaia e EDUSP.
- Ferri, M. G., 1972. Considerações sobre a origem, manutenção e transformação dos cerrados. Revta Biol. 9.
- Ferri, M. G., 1972. Carlos das Neves Tavares: sua vida e sua obra. Revta Biol.9.
- Ferri, M. G., 1972. Karl Martin Silberschmidt: sua vida e sua obra. Revta Biol. 25.
- Ferri, M. G., 1972. Ecological problems in Latin America. In Genes, Enzymes and Populations. Plenum Publishing Corporation: 5–24, New York.
- Ferri, M. G., 1974. Botânica: curso experimental-fisiologia. Companhia Melhoramentos de São Paulo e EDUSP.
- Ferri, M. G., 1974. A Botânica no Brasil: considerações históricas. História da ciência, vol.46.
- Ferri, M. G., 1974. Vegetação no Rio Grande do Sul. Livr. Itatiaia Ltda e EDUSP.
- Ferri, M. G., 1974. Ecologia: temas e problemas brasileiros. Livr. Itatiaia Ltda e EDUSP.
- Ferri, M. G., 1974. Information about the consequences of accelerated~ deforestation in Brazil. Proc. of the First International Congress of Ecology, 8–14 September: 355–360. Holanda.
- Ferri, M. G., 1975. Os cerrados de Minas Gerais. Ciência & Cult. 27.
- Ferri, M. G., 1975. Aylthon Brandão Joly: sua vida e sua obra. Boletim da Botânica, n° 3.
- Ferri, M. G., 1976. Ecologia e Poluição. Ed. Melhoramentos e EDUSP.
- Ferri, M. G., 1976. Plantas produtoras de fibras. Ed. Pedagógica e Universitária Ltda, São Paulo.
- Ferri, M. G., 1977. Ecologia dos cerrados. IV Simpósio sobre o Cerrado. Ed. Itatiaia Ltda e EDUSP.
- Ferri, M. G., 1977. O mundo em que vivemos. Ed. Melhoramentos. São Paulo.
- Ferri, M. G., 1978. Glossário ilustrado de Botânica. EBRATEC e EDUSP.
- Ferri, M. G., 1978. Ecologia comparada del "Cerrado" y de la "Caatinga". Mem. 5º Congresso Venezoelano de Botanica. Barquisimeto. Estado Lara. Venezuela. pp. 189–243.
- Ferri, M. G., 1978. Ecologia do cerrado. Editora Itatiaia e EDUSP.
- Ferri, M. G., 1979. História das ciências no Brasil. vol. I. Ed. Pedagógica e Universitária e EDUSP.
- Ferri, M. G., 1979. Fisiologia Vegetal. vol. I. Coord.. Editora Pedagógica e Universitária e EDUSP
- Ferri, M. G., 1979. Fisiologia Vegetal. vol. II. Coord.. Ed. Pedagógica e Universitária e EDUSP.
- Ferri, M. G., 1979. Breve histórico das mais importantes linhas de pesquisa no cerrado. 5°. Simpósio sobre o Cerrado: Uso e Manejo. Editerra.
- Ferri, M. G., 1980. Ecologia Geral. Itatiaia, Belo Horizonte.
- Ferri, M. G., 1980. Vegetação Brasileira. Itatiaia e EDUSP.
- Ferri, M. G., 1980. História das ciências no Brasil. vol. II. Coord.. Ed. Pedagógica e Universitária e EDUSP.
- Ferri, M. G., 1981. História das ciências no Brasil. vol. III. Coord.. Ed. Pedagógica e Universitária e EDUSP.
- Ferri, M. G., 1981. Botânica: curso experimental-fisiologia. 3ª ed., Ed. Nobel.
- Ferri, M. G., 1982. Ecologia e Poluição. Revta Problemas Brasileiros. Ano XIX, n°. 209.
- Ferri, M. G., 1982. Editora da Universidade de São Paulo. Revta Comunicações e Artes. USP nº 11.
- Ferri, M. G., 1982. Editora da Universidade de São Paulo. Ciência &Cult. 34.
- Ferri, M. G., 1982. Ecologia e Poluição. 5ª ed., Ed. Nobel.
- Ferri, M. G., 1983. Os cerrados, um grupo de formas de vegetação semelhantes às savanas. Revta Cadernos Germano-Brasileiros, Alemanha.
- Ferri, M. G., 1983. Editora da Universidade de São Paulo. Revta Cadernos Germanos-Brasileiros, Alemanha.
- Ferri, M. G., 1984. Glossário ilustrado de Botânica. Ed. Nobel, 14 ed., 29 reimpressão.
- Ferri, M. G., 1984. Botânica—Morfologia interna das plantas (Anatomia). 9ª edição, Ed. Nobel.
- Ferri, M. G., 1984. Os cerrados, um grupo de formas de vegetação semelhantes às savanas. Revta Biol. 12, 3–4.
- Ferri, M. G., 1985. Botânica – Morfologia externa das plantas (Organografia). 15ª edição, 3ª reimpressão, Ed. Nobel.
- Ferri, M. G., 1985. Fisiologia Vegetal. Vol. I. Coord..2ª ed. Editora Pedagógica e Universitária e EDUSP
