= Jakup Ferri (artist) =

Kosovarian contemporary artist

Jakup Ferri (born 1981) is a contemporary artist from Amsterdam, Netherlands and Pristina, Kosovo. He is a professor at Pristina Art Academy and guest advisor at Rijksakademie in Amsterdam. Ferri's work has been shown at international exhibitions in museums and galleries, festivals and biennials, including Venice Biennale, Istanbul Biennial, Prague Biennale, Cetinje Biennale and Manifesta Biennale, Ljubljana Biennial of Graphic Art.

== Education and residencies ==
Ferri studied at Pristina Art Academy and Rijksakademie in Amsterdam. He has been an artist-in-residence at numerous places, including the International Studio and Curatorial Program New York in 2004 and the Kultur Kontakt Austria in 2005.

== Work ==
Ferri is best known for his figurative paintings and embroideries, which have been characterized as "poetic interactions between people, creatures and objects" (Alisa Goiani Berisha, Curator at the National Museum of Kosovo). Eveline Suter (Curator at Museum of Art Lucerne, Switzerland) describes his visual world as colourful and full of happy creatures. Ferri draws inspiration from microorganisms, folk art, arts and crafts, art brut, and the pixel world of computer games.

== Prizes and awards ==
In 2006 he received a prestigious award Kunstpreis Europas Zukunft (The Future of Europe), Museum of Contemporary Art (GfZK) Leipzig. In 2008 he received the Buning Brongers Award in Amsterdam and in 2003 the Muslim Mulliqi Prize and the Artists of Tomorrow Award. In 2020, Ferri was awarded the Gjelosh Gjokaj Prize.

== Selected exhibitions ==
=== Solo ===
- 2024 We We, curated by Thomas Niemeyer, Städtische Galerie Nordhorn, Germany
- 2023 Funk your Funk, Ferda Art Platform, Istanbul, Turkey
- 2023 We, We or Me, curated by Eveline Suter, Kunstmuseum Luzerne, Switzerland
- 2022 The Monumentality of the Everyday, Pavilion of Republic of Kosovo, La Biennale di Venezia, Venice, Italy
- 2021 Sunray Acrobat, Kunstraum Innsbruck, Innsbruck, Austria
- 2021 Tintirinti, Andriesse-Eyck Gallery, Amsterdam, Netherlands
- 2018 Muscle Memory, The Horse Hospital, London, United Kingdom
- 2016 Muscle Memory, Bradwolff Projects, Amsterdam, Netherlands
- 2013 Cold Water Boils Faster, Van Zijll Langhout / Contemporary Art, Amsterdam, Netherlands
- 2011 Laughing Lessons, Weingrüll, Karlsruhe, Germany
- 2010 Paper Vegetables, De Hallen, Haarlem, Netherlands

=== Group ===
- 2022 Manifesta 14, Pristina, Kosovo
- 2009 Coalesce:Happenstance, Smart Project Space, Amsterdam, Netherlands
- 2006 Ethnic Marketing, Azad Gallery, Tehran, Iran
- 2003 In den Schluchten des Balkan, Kunsthalle Fridericianum, Kassel, Germany

== Publications ==
- 2023 Art Textile Kunst, editors: Cathérine Hug and Bernhard Stadelmann, AS Verlag
- 2022 Jakup Ferri – The Monumentality of the Everyday, Verlag Kettler

== Press ==
- 2023, Im Kunstmuseum Luzern erzählen fantastische Wesen ihre Geschichten auf bunten Stickereien, Luzerner Zeitung, Switzerland
- 2023, Glückliche Menschen, Tiere und Mischwesen – Jakup Ferris Kosmos voller Geschichten im Kunstmuseum Luzern, Arttv.ch, Switzerland
- 2022, The Art World Came to Kosovo. What Happens When It Leaves?, The New York Times, United States
- 2022, The Exhibition At Venice Biennale Revelling In The Joy Of The Everyday, Service95, United Kingdom
- 2022, Biennale Arte 2022: 10 pavillons to see, Interni, Italy
- 2021, Jakup Ferri: farbenfrohe Leichtigkeit des Seins, Kronen Zeitung, Austria
