= John Fery =

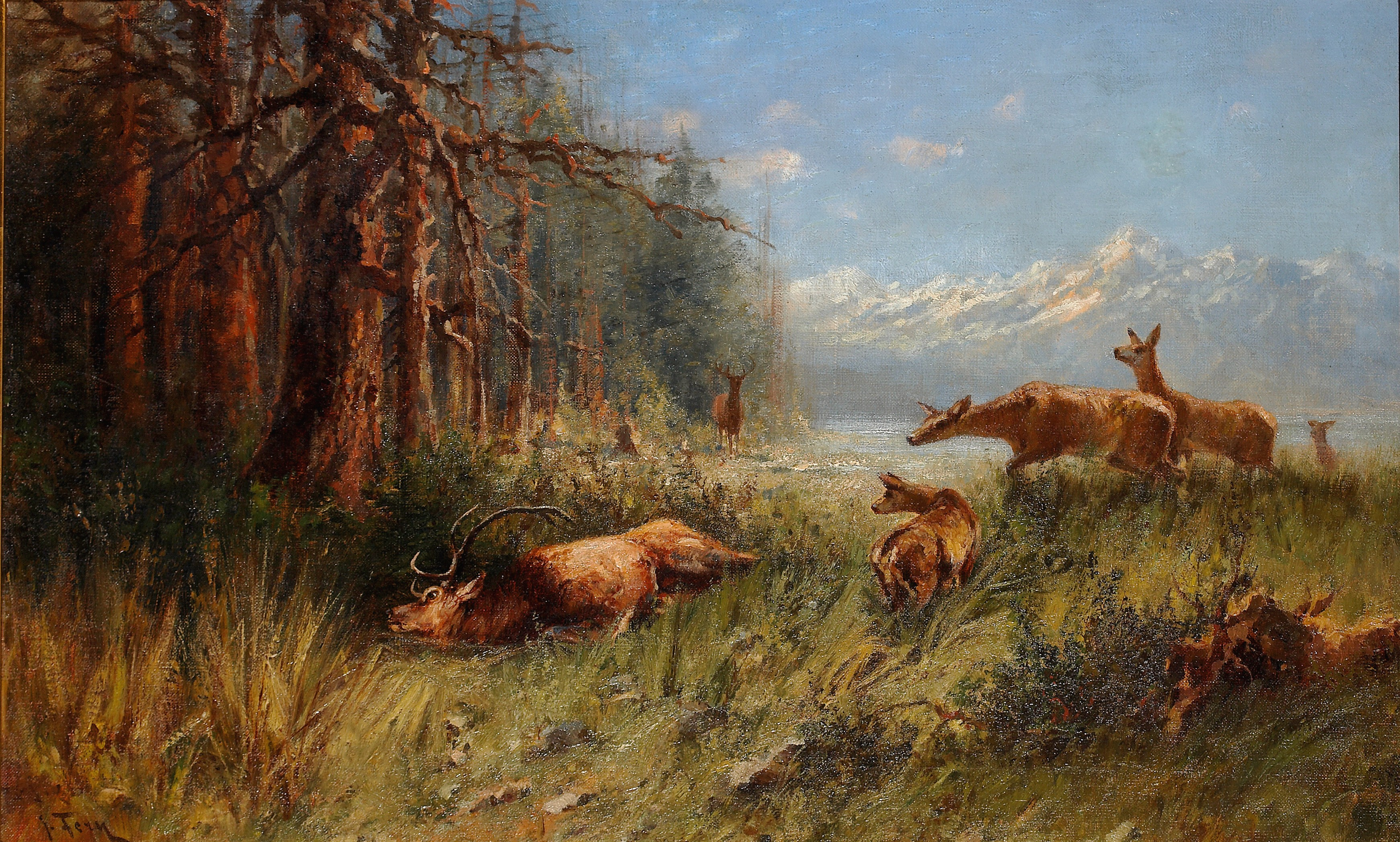
Landscape with Fallow Deers, by John Fery.

John Fery (1859–1934) (born Johann Nepomuk Levy) was an Austrian Empire-born painter, known for his works of the Western United States. He was a painter of outdoor scenes, whose largest customer was the Great Northern Railway. His works were large format, often over one hundred square feet (9 m^{2}).

Fery's paintings were hung in train stations and other places, promoting travel, particularly to Glacier National Park. "Painting the Wilderness: John Fery and Contemporaries", exhibit through Sept. 15, 2014 at the Wildling Art Museum, 1511-B Mission Dr., Solvang, California. www.wildlingmuseum.org

His grandson, John B. Fery (1930–2017), was chief executive officer of Boise Cascade Corporation from 1972 to 1995.
