= Des Broomfield =

English footballer

Personal information
- Full name: Desmond Stretton Broomfield
- Date of birth: 6 October 1921
- Place of birth: Hove, England
- Date of death: 5 June 2007 (aged 85)
- Place of death: Burgess Hill, England
- Height: 5 ft 8 in (1.73 m)
- Position: Wing half

Senior career*
Years	Team	Apps	(Gls)
1936–1948	Brighton & Hove Albion		
1948–195?	Hastings United	20	(0)
- Shoreham
- * Club domestic league appearances and goals

Desmond Stretton Broomfield (6 October 1921 – 5 June 2007) was an English footballer who played as a wing half in the Football League for Brighton & Hove Albion.

Broomfield was born in 1921 in Hove, Sussex, and attended Shoreham Grammar School. He joined Brighton & Hove Albion as a 16-year-old amateur, but his career was interrupted by the outbreak of war, during which he served in the Royal Air Force. He returned to Albion in time to play in the first post-war league match, still as an amateur, signed on semi-professional terms in 1947, and went on to make 26 first-team appearances. He later played non-league football for Hastings United and Shoreham. Broomfield died in Burgess Hill in 2007 at the age of 85.
