= Alessandro Ferri =

Italian footballer (1921–2003)

Personal information
- Date of birth: 25 February 1921
- Place of birth: Rome, Italy
- Date of death: 2003
- Place of death: Rome, Italy
- Position: Defender

Senior career*
Years	Team	Apps	(Gls)
1938–1943	Lazio	68	(0)
1944–1945	Audace Taranto		
1945–1948	Lazio	61	(1)
1948–1950	Roma	38	(1)
1950–1953	Reggina		
- * Club domestic league appearances and goals

Alessandro Ferri (25 February 1921 – 2003) was an Italian professional football player.

He started playing as a child with S.S. Lazio and went through every youth team the club had. On 15 January 1939, he came to get the tickets for the Derby della Capitale game against fierce city rivals A.S. Roma, like he had been doing for several previous years. The club president told him: "Today you don't need tickets, you're playing". He became a regular in the Lazio defence for several years.

In his last Serie A game for Lazio, he scored his only league goal for them, on 30 November 1947, in a 1–1 draw against Atalanta B.C.

The next season, after financial disagreements with the club management, he transferred to the rival A.S. Roma team.

Overall, he played 9 seasons (148 games, 2 goals) in the Serie A for Lazio and Roma.
