= Gesualdo Francesco Ferri =

Italian painter

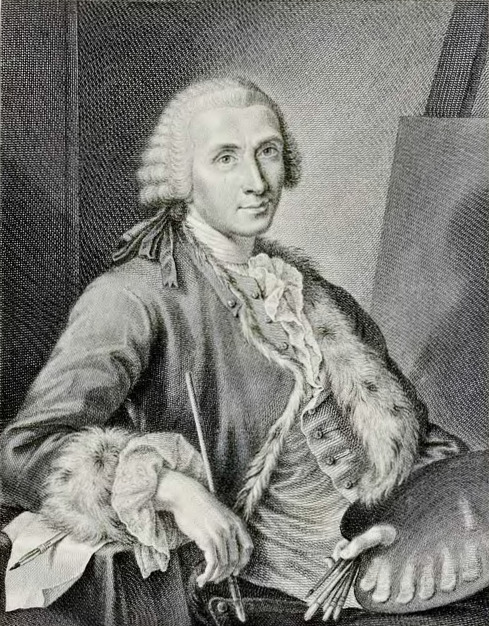
- Born: 2 January 1728; San Miniato
- Died: 22 September 1799 (aged 71); Florence
- Occupation: Painter, restorer, art collector

Gesualdo Francesco Ferri (San Miniato, Province of Pisa, 2 January 1728 – 22 September 1799) was an Italian painter, active mainly in Florence.

== Biography ==
He trained in Florence under Giuseppe Piattoli, then became a pupil in Rome under Giuseppe Bottani and Pompeo Batoni. He painted a number of altarpieces in Tuscany. He painted a San Lorenzo in Glory for Lorenzo Niccolini's villa at Bibbiena.

He participated in the decoration of the Villa del Poggio Imperiale with scene gallante and for the Church of San Firenze.
