= 2023–24 Crystal Palace F.C. season =

English football club season

Crystal Palace
2023–24 season
- Owners: Steve Parish; Josh Harris; David Blitzer; John Textor
- Chairman: Steve Parish
- Manager: Roy Hodgson (until 19 February); Paddy McCarthy (caretaker, 19 February); Oliver Glasner (from 19 February)
- Stadium: Selhurst Park
- Premier League: 10th
- FA Cup: Third round
- EFL Cup: Third round
- Top goalscorer: League: Jean-Philippe Mateta (16); All: Jean-Philippe Mateta (19)
- Average home league attendance: 24,932
Home colours	Away colours	Third colours

The 2023–24 season was the 118th season in the history of Crystal Palace and their eleventh consecutive season in the Premier League. In addition to the domestic league, the club participated in the FA Cup and the EFL Cup.

This was the first season since 2013–14 to not feature either Ivorian winger Wilfried Zaha, who departed for Turkish club Galatasaray in the summer, and Scottish midfielder James McArthur, who retired. Joel Ward was appointed club captain at the beginning of the season, replacing Luka Milivojević, who left for Emirati club Shabab Al Ahli. Zaha's departure meant that Ward became the last remaining player from Palace's promotion-winning side of 2012–13.

Despite being 15th and just 5 points above the relegation zone in mid-February, the appointment of Oliver Glasner revived the team's fortunes and a strong finish saw the Eagles equal both their highest league finish (10th, achieved in 2014–15) and highest points total (49, achieved in 2018–19) of the Premier League era.

Four Crystal Palace players (Eberechi Eze, Marc Guéhi, Dean Henderson and Adam Wharton) were called up for the English national team for the UEFA Euro 2024, meaning the Eagles became the club with the most representatives in the England team.

== Squad ==
As of 15 March 2024

No.	Player	Position	Nationality	Place of birth	Date of birth (age)	Signed from	Date signed	Fee	Contract end
Goalkeepers
1	Sam Johnstone	GK	(England)	Preston	25 March 1993 (age 33)	West Bromwich Albion	1 July 2022	Free transfer	30 June 2027
30	Dean Henderson	GK	(England)	Whitehaven	12 March 1997 (age 29)	Manchester United	31 August 2023	£15,000,000	30 June 2028
31	Remi Matthews	GK	(England)	Gorleston	10 February 1994 (age 32)	Sunderland	12 July 2021	Free transfer	30 June 2024
Defenders
2	Joel Ward (captain)	RB	(England)	Emsworth	29 October 1989 (age 37)	Portsmouth	1 July 2012	£525,000	30 June 2025
3	Tyrick Mitchell	LB	(England)	Brent	1 September 1999 (age 27)	Brentford	22 July 2016	Free transfer	30 June 2025
4	Rob Holding	CB	(England)	Stalybridge	20 September 1995 (age 31)	Arsenal	1 September 2023	£1,000,000	30 June 2026
5	James Tomkins	CB	(England)	Basildon	29 March 1989 (age 37)	West Ham United	5 July 2016	£9,800,000	30 June 2024
6	Marc Guéhi	CB	(England)	(Ivory Coast) Abidjan	13 July 2000 (age 26)	Chelsea	18 July 2021	£20,000,000	30 June 2026
12	Daniel Muñoz	RB	(Colombia)	Amalfi	24 May 1996 (age 30)	(Belgium) Genk	30 January 2024	Undisclosed	30 June 2027
16	Joachim Andersen	CB	(Denmark)	Solrød Strand	31 May 1996 (age 30)	(France) Lyon	28 July 2021	£15,000,000	30 June 2026
17	Nathaniel Clyne	RB	(England)	Stockwell	5 April 1991 (age 35)	Liverpool	14 October 2020	Free transfer	30 June 2024
26	Chris Richards	CB	(United States)	Birmingham	28 March 2000 (age 26)	(Germany) Bayern Munich	27 July 2022	£10,000,000	30 June 2027
Midfielders
8	Jefferson Lerma	DM	(Colombia)	El Cerrito	25 October 1994 (age 32)	Bournemouth	1 July 2023	Free transfer	30 June 2026
10	Eberechi Eze	AM	(England)	Greenwich	29 June 1998 (age 28)	Queens Park Rangers	28 August 2020	£16,000,000	30 June 2027
11	Matheus França	AM	(Brazil)	Rio de Janeiro	1 April 2004 (age 22)	(Brazil) Flamengo	5 August 2023	£17,250,000	30 June 2028
15	Jeffrey Schlupp	LM	(Ghana)	(Germany) Hamburg	23 December 1992 (age 33)	Leicester City	13 January 2017	£12,000,000	30 June 2025
19	Will Hughes	CM	(England)	Weybridge	17 April 1995 (age 31)	Watford	28 August 2021	£6,000,000	30 June 2025
20	Adam Wharton	CM	(England)	Blackburn	6 February 2004 (age 22)	Blackburn Rovers	1 February 2024	Undisclosed	30 June 2029
28	Cheick Doucouré	DM	(Mali)	Bamako	8 January 2000 (age 26)	(France) Lens	11 July 2022	£19,000,000	30 June 2029
29	Naouirou Ahamada	CM	(France)	Marseille	29 March 2002 (age 24)	(Germany) VfB Stuttgart	31 January 2023	£10,500,000	30 June 2026
44	Jaïro Riedewald	DM	(Netherlands)	Haarlem	9 September 1996 (age 30)	(Netherlands) Ajax	24 July 2017	£8,000,000	30 June 2024
52	David Ozoh	DM	(England)	(Spain) Valencia	6 May 2005 (age 21)	Academy	11 August 2022	Trainee	30 June 2024
60	Jadan Raymond	AM	(Wales)	(England) London	15 October 2003 (age 23)	Academy	19 October 2020	Trainee	30 June 2025
Forwards
7	Michael Olise	RW	(France)	(England) Hammersmith	12 December 2001 (age 24)	Reading	8 July 2021	£8,000,000	30 June 2027
9	Jordan Ayew	CF	(Ghana)	(France) Marseille	11 September 1991 (age 35)	Swansea City	25 July 2019	£2,500,000	30 June 2025
14	Jean-Philippe Mateta	CF	(France)	Sevran	28 June 1997 (age 29)	(Germany) Mainz 05	31 January 2022	£9,000,000	30 June 2026
22	Odsonne Édouard	CF	(France)	Kourou	16 January 1998 (age 28)	(Scotland) Celtic	31 August 2021	£14,000,000	30 June 2025
49	Jesurun Rak-Sakyi	RW	(England)	Southwark	5 October 2002 (age 24)	Chelsea	1 July 2019	Free transfer	30 June 2027
55	Franco Umeh-Chibueze	RW	(Republic of Ireland)		26 January 2005 (age 21)	(Republic of Ireland) Cork City	2 February 2023	£65,000	30 June 2025
Out on Loan
23	Malcolm Ebiowei	RW	(England)	London	4 September 2003 (age 23)	Derby County	1 July 2022	Free transfer	30 June 2027
37	John-Kymani Gordon	CF	(England)	London	13 February 2003 (age 23)	Academy	1 January 2021	Trainee	30 June 2024
45	Tayo Adaramola	LB	(Republic of Ireland)	Dublin	14 November 2003 (age 22)	Academy	1 July 2020	Trainee	30 June 2024
48	Luke Plange	CF	(England)	Kingston upon Thames	4 November 2002 (age 24)	Derby County	31 January 2022	£1,000,000	30 June 2025

== Transfers ==
=== In ===
Date	Pos.	Player	Transferred from	Fee	Ref.
1 July 2023	CM	(Colombia) Jefferson Lerma	(England) Bournemouth	Free	
1 August 2023	CB	(England) Chris Francis †	(England) Bournemouth	Free	
5 August 2023	AM	(Brazil) Matheus França	(Brazil) Flamengo	Undisclosed	
21 August 2023	LM	(Northern Ireland) Justin Devenny †	(Scotland) Airdrieonians	Undisclosed	
24 August 2023	RW	(England) Roshaun Mathurin †	(England) Tottenham Hotspur	Free	
31 August 2023	GK	(England) Dean Henderson	(England) Manchester United	Undisclosed	
1 September 2023	CB	(England) Rob Holding	(England) Arsenal	Undisclosed	
23 January 2024	CB	(Northern Ireland) Craig Farquhar †	(Northern Ireland) Larne	Undisclosed	
26 January 2024	CB	(Republic of Ireland) Luke Browne †	(Republic of Ireland) Shelbourne	Undisclosed	
30 January 2024	RB	(Colombia) Daniel Muñoz	(Belgium) Genk	Undisclosed	
1 February 2024	CM	(England) Adam Wharton	(England) Blackburn Rovers	Undisclosed	

† Signed for Under-21s

=== Out ===
Date	Pos.	Player	Transferred to	Fee	Ref.
21 July 2023	GK	(Kosovo) Laurence Shala	(England) Wycombe Wanderers	Free transfer	
1 July 2023	CF	(England) Rob Street	(England) Cheltenham Town	Free transfer	
9 August 2023	AM	(England) Fionn Mooney	(Spain) Valladolid	Undisclosed	
15 August 2023	CB	(Republic of Ireland) Jake O'Brien	(France) Lyon	Undisclosed	
1 September 2023	GK	(Spain) Vicente Guaita	(Spain) Celta Vigo	Free transfer	

=== Loaned in ===
Date	Pos.	Player	Loaned from	Fee	Ref.

=== Loaned out ===
Date	Pos.	Player	Loaned to	Until	Ref.
14 July 2023	GK	(England) Owen Goodman	(England) Colchester United	End of season	
15 July 2023	CB	(Northern Ireland) Kofi Balmer	(England) Port Vale	16 January 2024 (Note: On 16 January, Balmer was recalled from his season-long loan at Port Vale and subsequently joined AFC Wimbledon on loan.)	
18 July 2023	DM	(England) Malachi Boateng	(Scotland) Dundee	End of season	
1 August 2023	CF	(England) Luke Plange	(England) Carlisle United	4 January 2024	
10 August 2023	RW	(Scotland) Scott Banks	(Germany) FC St. Pauli	End of season	
11 August 2023	AM	(Republic of Ireland) Killian Phillips	(England) Wycombe Wanderers	28 January 2024 (Note: On 28 January, Phillips was recalled from his season-long loan at Wycombe and subsequently joined Aberdeen on loan.)	
1 September 2023	CF	(England) John-Kymani Gordon	(England) Cambridge United	17 January 2024 (Note: On 17 January, Gordon returned from his loan at Cambridge and subsequently joined AFC Wimbledon on loan.)	
18 September 2023	LB	(Nigeria) Kelvin Agho	(Serbia) Voždovac	End of season	
4 January 2024	CB	(Republic of Ireland) Sean Grehan	(England) Carlisle United	4 April 2024 (Note: On 4 April, Grehan returned early from his loan at Carlisle.)	
17 January 2024	CF	(England) John-Kymani Gordon	(England) AFC Wimbledon	End of season	
23 January 2024	LB	(Republic of Ireland) Tayo Adaramola	(Belgium) RWD Molenbeek	End of season	
25 January 2024	CF	(England) Ademola Ola-Adebomi	(England) Burton Albion	End of season	
28 January 2024	CM	(Republic of Ireland) Killian Phillips	(Scotland) Aberdeen	End of season	
31 January 2024	CB	(Northern Ireland) Kofi Balmer	(England) AFC Wimbledon	End of season	
1 February 2024	RW	(England) Malcolm Ebiowei	(Belgium) RWD Molenbeek	End of season	
15 March 2024	CF	(England) Luke Plange	(Finland) HJK Helsinki	1 January 2025	

=== Released ===
Date	Pos.	Player	Subsequent club	Join date	Ref.
30 June 2023	GK	(England) Jack Butland	(Scotland) Rangers	1 July 2023	
30 June 2023	CB	(England) Daniel Quick	(England) Eastbourne Borough	1 July 2023	
30 June 2023	AM	(Equatorial Guinea) Basilio Rieno	(England) Burnley	1 July 2023	
30 June 2023	RM	(England) Maliq Cadogan	(Wales) Swansea City	4 July 2023	
30 June 2023	CB	(England) Ryan Bartley	(England) Derby County	7 July 2023	
30 June 2023	CF	(England) Junior Dixon	(England) Birmingham City	12 July 2023	
30 June 2023	LW	(Ivory Coast) Wilfried Zaha	(Turkey) Galatasaray	24 July 2023	
30 June 2023	CM	(England) Matthew Vigor	(England) Cray Valley PM	29 July 2023	
30 June 2023	DM	(England) Freddie Bell	(United States) Penn State Nittany Lions	1 August 2023	
30 June 2023	CM	(Serbia) Luka Milivojević	(United Arab Emirates) Shabab Al Ahli	8 August 2023	
30 June 2023	LB	(England) Reece Hannam	(England) Stevenage	14 August 2023	
30 June 2023	RB	(England) David Boateng	(England) AFC Croydon	19 August 2023	
30 June 2023	RW	(England) David Omilabu	(England) Maidenhead United	24 August 2023	
30 June 2023	RB	(England) Kalani Barton	(England) Leatherhead	1 September 2023	
30 June 2023	RB	(England) Joshua Addae	Currently unattached		
30 June 2023	CB	(England) James Leonard	Currently unattached		
30 June 2023	RB	(England) Cameron Lewis-Brown	Currently unattached		
30 June 2023	CM	(Scotland) James McArthur	None (Retired)		

== Pre-season and friendlies ==
On 12 May, Palace announced a pre-season stateside tour to Chicago and Detroit to face Millonarios and Sevilla respectively. A week later, a first UK based pre-season fixture was confirmed with a trip to Crawley Town. On 6 June, a fourth pre-season fixture was announced, against Barnet. A fifth, but behind-closed-doors fixture against Brøndby was later confirmed. On 7 July, the final pre-season fixtures were announced, against Lyon and Watford.

Win Draw Loss Fixtures

11 July 2023 Friendly	Barnet	1–0	Crystal Palace	Canons Park
19:30 BST	Senior 84'	Report		Stadium: The Hive Stadium; Attendance: 2,469

15 July 2023 Friendly	Crystal Palace	2–2	Brøndby	Beckenham
14:00 BST	Rak-Sakyi 35'; Mateta 50'	Report	Kvistgaarden 47', 54'	Stadium: Palace Academy; Attendance: 0 (behind-closed-doors)

19 July 2023 Friendly	Crawley Town	0–4	Crystal Palace	Crawley
19:45 BST		Report	Mateta 8', 16'; Eze 23'; Ahamada 24'	Stadium: Broadfield Stadium; Attendance: 6,134

22 July 2023 Friendly	Crystal Palace	2–1	Watford	Beckenham
13:00 BST	Édouard 54', 75'	Report	Kayembe 68'	Stadium: Palace Academy; Attendance: 0 (behind-closed-doors)

26 July 2023 Friendly	Millonarios	2–1	Crystal Palace	Bridgeview, United States
19:00 CDT (01:00 BST)	Castro 74', 90' (pen.)	Report	O'Brien 64'	Stadium: SeatGeek Stadium; Referee: Sergii Demianchuk (United States)

30 July 2023 Motor City Cup	Crystal Palace	1–1 (0–1 p)	Sevilla	Detroit, United States
19:00 EDT (00:00 BST)	Eze 75'	Report	Gudelj (yellow card) 9' (yellow-red card) 80'; Rakitić 44'	Stadium: Comerica Park; Referee: Natalie Simon (United States)
	Penalties
	Andersen (penalty missed)		(penalty scored) Rakitić
Note: Penalty shoot-out was immediate sudden death.

5 August 2023 Friendly	Crystal Palace	2–0	Lyon	Selhurst
18:30 BST	Schlupp 14'; Édouard 59'	Report		Stadium: Selhurst Park

14 March 2024 Friendly	Crystal Palace	1–0	Bodø/Glimt	Marbella, Spain
16:00 CET (15:00 GMT)	Eze 23'	Report		Stadium: Marbella Football Center; Attendance: 0 (behind-closed-doors)

== Competitions ==
=== Overall record ===
Competition	First match	Last match	Starting round	Final position	Record							
Competition	First match	Last match	Starting round	Final position	Pld	W	D	L	GF	GA	GD	Win %
Premier League	12 August 2023	19 May 2024	Matchday 1	10th	38	13	10	15	57	58	−1	34.21
FA Cup	4 January 2024	17 January 2024	Third round	Third round	2	0	1	1	0	1	−1	0.00
EFL Cup	29 August 2023	26 September 2023	Second round	Third round	2	1	0	1	4	5	−1	50.00
Total					42	14	11	17	61	64	−3	33.33

Source: Soccerway

=== Premier League ===
==== League table ====
Pos	Team	Pld	W	D	L	GF	GA	GD	Pts	Qualification or relegation
8	Manchester United	38	18	6	14	57	58	−1	60	Qualification for the Europa League league phase (Note: Manchester United qualified for the Europa League league phase as the 2023–24 FA Cup winners.)
9	West Ham United	38	14	10	14	60	74	−14	52	
10	Crystal Palace	38	13	10	15	57	58	−1	49	
11	Brighton & Hove Albion	38	12	12	14	55	62	−7	48	
12	Bournemouth	38	13	9	16	54	67	−13	48	

Source: Premier League
Rules for classification: 1) Points; 2) Goal difference; 3) Goals scored; 4) If the champions, relegated teams or qualified teams for UEFA competitions cannot be determined by rules 1 to 3, rules 4.1 to 4.3 are applied – 4.1) Points gained in head-to-head record between such teams; 4.2) Away goals scored in head-to-head record between such teams; 4.3) Play-offs

==== Results summary ====
Overall								Home						Away					
Pld	W	D	L	GF	GA	GD	Pts	W	D	L	GF	GA	GD	W	D	L	GF	GA	GD
38	13	10	15	57	58	−1	49	8	4	7	37	26	+11	5	6	8	20	32	−12

Source: Soccerway

==== Results by round ====
Round	1	2	3	4	5	6	7	8	9	10	11	12	13	14	15	16	17	18	19	20	21	22	23	24	25	26	27	28	30	31	32	33	34	29^{1}	35	36	37	38
Ground	A	H	A	H	A	H	A	H	A	H	A	H	A	A	H	H	A	H	A	H	A	H	A	H	A	H	A	H	A	A	H	A	H	H	A	H	A	H
Result	W	L	D	W	L	D	W	D	L	L	W	L	L	D	L	L	D	D	L	W	L	W	L	L	D	W	L	D	D	L	L	W	W	W	D	W	W	W
Position	5	11	11	7	9	10	9	9	11	13	11	13	13	12	14	15	15	15	15	14	15	14	14	15	15	14	14	14	14	14	14	14	14	14	14	14	12	10
Points	3	3	4	7	7	8	11	12	12	12	15	15	15	16	16	16	17	18	18	21	21	24	24	24	25	28	28	29	30	30	30	33	36	39	40	43	46	49

Source: Soccerway
A = Away; H = Home; W = Win; D = Draw; L = Loss

==== Matches ====
On 15 June, the Premier League fixtures were released.

Win Draw Loss Fixtures

12 August 2023 1	Sheffield United	0–1	Crystal Palace	Sheffield
15:00 BST		Report	Édouard 49'	Stadium: Bramall Lane; Attendance: 31,194; Referee: John Brooks

21 August 2023 2	Crystal Palace	0–1	Arsenal	Selhurst
20:00 BST		Report	Ødegaard 53' (pen.); Tomiyasu (yellow card) 60' (yellow-red card) 67'	Stadium: Selhurst Park; Attendance: 24,189; Referee: David Coote
Note: Fixture was rescheduled from 19 to 21 August due to TV broadcast selections. Live on Sky Sports.

26 August 2023 3	Brentford	1–1	Crystal Palace	Brentford
15:00 BST	Schade 18'	Report	Andersen 76'	Stadium: Gtech Community Stadium; Attendance: 16,997; Referee: Peter Bankes

3 September 2023 4	Crystal Palace	3–2	Wolverhampton Wanderers	Selhurst
14:00 BST	Édouard 56', 84'; Eze 78'	Report	Hwang 65'; Cunha 90+6'	Stadium: Selhurst Park; Attendance: 24,741; Referee: Robert Jones
Note: Fixture was rescheduled from 2 to 3 September due to TV broadcast selections. Live on Sky Sports.

16 September 2023 5	Aston Villa	3–1	Crystal Palace	Birmingham
15:00 BST	Durán 87'; Douglas Luiz 90+8' (pen.); Bailey 90+11'	Report	Édouard 47'	Stadium: Villa Park; Attendance: 40,809; Referee: Darren England

23 September 2023 6	Crystal Palace	0–0	Fulham	Selhurst
15:00 BST		Report		Stadium: Selhurst Park; Attendance: 25,072; Referee: Paul Tierney

30 September 2023 7	Manchester United	0–1	Crystal Palace	Trafford
15:00 BST		Report	Andersen 25'	Stadium: Old Trafford; Attendance: 73,428; Referee: Chris Kavanagh

7 October 2023 8	Crystal Palace	0–0	Nottingham Forest	Selhurst
17:30 BST		Report		Stadium: Selhurst Park; Attendance: 25,017; Referee: Craig Pawson

21 October 2023 9	Newcastle United	4–0	Crystal Palace	Newcastle upon Tyne
15:00 BST	Murphy 4'; Gordon 44'; Longstaff 45+2'; Wilson 66'	Report		Stadium: St James' Park; Attendance: 52,189; Referee: Tim Robinson

27 October 2023 10	Crystal Palace	1–2	Tottenham Hotspur	Selhurst
20:00 BST	Ayew 90+4'	Report	Ward 53' (o.g.); Son 66'	Stadium: Selhurst Park; Attendance: 25,074; Referee: Andrew Madley

4 November 2023 11	Burnley	0–2	Crystal Palace	Burnley
15:00 GMT		Report	Schlupp 22'; Mitchell 90+4'	Stadium: Turf Moor; Attendance: 21,578; Referee: Peter Bankes

11 November 2023 12	Crystal Palace	2–3	Everton	Selhurst
15:00 GMT	Eze 5' (pen.); Édouard 73'	Report	Mykolenko 1'; Doucouré 49'; Gueye 86'	Stadium: Selhurst Park; Attendance: 25,103; Referee: Sam Barrott

25 November 2023 13	Luton Town	2–1	Crystal Palace	Luton
15:00 GMT	Mengi 72'; Brown 83'	Report	Olise 74'	Stadium: Kenilworth Road; Attendance: 11,029; Referee: Jarred Gillett

3 December 2023 14	West Ham United	1–1	Crystal Palace	Stratford
15:00 GMT	Kudus 13'	Report	Édouard 53'	Stadium: London Stadium; Attendance: 62,459; Referee: Michael Oliver

6 December 2023 15	Crystal Palace	0–2	Bournemouth	Selhurst
19:30 GMT		Report	Senesi 25'; Moore 90+1'	Stadium: Selhurst Park; Attendance: 24,104; Referee: Craig Pawson

9 December 2023 16	Crystal Palace	1–2	Liverpool	Selhurst
12:30 GMT	Mateta 57' (pen.); Ayew (yellow card) 60' (yellow-red card) 75'	Report	Salah 76'; Elliott 90+1'	Stadium: Selhurst Park; Attendance: 25,103; Referee: Andrew Madley

16 December 2023 17	Manchester City	2–2	Crystal Palace	Manchester
15:00 GMT	Grealish 24'; Lewis 54'	Report	Mateta 76'; Olise 90+5' (pen.)	Stadium: Etihad Stadium; Attendance: 53,112; Referee: Paul Tierney

21 December 2023 18	Crystal Palace	1–1	Brighton & Hove Albion	Selhurst
20:00 GMT	Ayew 45+1'	Report	Welbeck 82'	Stadium: Selhurst Park; Attendance: 24,171; Referee: John Brooks

27 December 2023 19	Chelsea	2–1	Crystal Palace	Fulham
19:30 GMT	Mudryk 13'; Madueke 89' (pen.)	Report	Olise 45+1'	Stadium: Stamford Bridge; Attendance: 39,618; Referee: Michael Salisbury

30 December 2023 20	Crystal Palace	3–1	Brentford	Selhurst
15:00 GMT	Olise 14', 58'; Eze 39'	Report	Lewis-Potter 2'	Stadium: Selhurst Park; Attendance: 25,472; Referee: Robert Jones

20 January 2024 21	Arsenal	5–0	Crystal Palace	Holloway
12:30 GMT	Gabriel 11', 37'; Trossard 59'; Martinelli 90+4', 90+5'	Report		Stadium: Emirates Stadium; Attendance: 60,284; Referee: Paul Tierney

30 January 2024 22	Crystal Palace	3–2	Sheffield United	Selhurst
20:00 GMT	Eze 17', 27'; Olise 67'	Report	Brereton 1'; McAtee 20'	Stadium: Selhurst Park; Referee: Tony Harrington

3 February 2024 23	Brighton & Hove Albion	4–1	Crystal Palace	Falmer
15:00	Dunk 3'; Hinshelwood 33'; Buonanotte 34'; João Pedro 84'	Report	Mateta 71'	Stadium: Falmer Stadium; Attendance: 31,345; Referee: Simon Hooper

12 February 2024 24	Crystal Palace	1–3	Chelsea	Selhurst
20:00	Lerma 30'	Report	Gallagher 47', 90+1'; Fernández 90+4'	Stadium: Selhurst Park; Attendance: 25,110; Referee: Michael Oliver

19 February 2024 25	Everton	1–1	Crystal Palace	Walton
20:00 GMT	Onana 84'	Report	Ayew 66'	Stadium: Goodison Park; Attendance: 38,164; Referee: Paul Tierney

24 February 2024 26	Crystal Palace	3–0	Burnley	Selhurst
15:00 GMT	Richards 68'; Ayew 71'; Mateta 79' (pen.)	Report	Brownhill (red card) 35'	Stadium: Selhurst Park; Attendance: 24,042; Referee: Lewis Smith

2 March 2024 27	Tottenham Hotspur	3–1	Crystal Palace	Tottenham
15:00 GMT	Werner 77'; Romero 80'; Son 88'	Report	Eze 59'	Stadium: Tottenham Hotspur Stadium; Attendance: 61,339; Referee: John Brooks

9 March 2024 28	Crystal Palace	1–1	Luton Town	Selhurst
15:00 GMT	Mateta 11'	Report	Woodrow 90+6'	Stadium: Selhurst Park; Attendance: 25,103; Referee: Sunny Singh Gill

30 March 2024 30	Nottingham Forest	1–1	Crystal Palace	West Bridgford
15:00 GMT	Wood 61'	Report	Mateta 11'	Stadium: City Ground; Attendance: 29,520; Referee: Chris Kavanagh

2 April 2024 31	Bournemouth	1–0	Crystal Palace	Bournemouth
19:45 BST	Kluivert 79'	Report		Stadium: Vitality Stadium; Referee: Graham Scott

6 April 2024 32	Crystal Palace	2–4	Manchester City	Selhurst
12:30 BST	Mateta 3'; Édouard 86'	Report	De Bruyne 13', 70'; Lewis 47'; Haaland 66'	Stadium: Selhurst Park; Attendance: 25,132; Referee: Paul Tierney
Note: Fixture was initially scheduled for a 15:00 kick-off, but was moved for live TNT Sports broadcast.

14 April 2024 33	Liverpool	0–1	Crystal Palace	Liverpool
14:00 BST		Report	Eze 14'	Stadium: Anfield; Referee: Chris Kavanagh
Note: Fixture was initially scheduled for 13 April, but was moved for live Sky Sports broadcast.

21 April 2024 34	Crystal Palace	5–2	West Ham United	Selhurst
15:00 BST	Olise 7'; Eze 16'; Emerson 20' (o.g.); Mateta 31', 64'	Report	Antonio 40'; Henderson 89' (o.g.)	Stadium: Selhurst Park; Attendance: 25,145; Referee: Graham Scott
Note: Fixture was initially scheduled for 20 April, but was moved due to West Ham's UEFA Europa League involvement.

24 April 2024 29	Crystal Palace	2–0	Newcastle United	Selhurst
20:00 BST	Mateta 55', 88'	Report		Stadium: Selhurst Park; Attendance: 25,002; Referee: Thomas Bramall
Note: Fixture was originally scheduled for 16 March, but was postponed due to Newcastle's FA Cup progression.

27 April 2024 35	Fulham	1–1	Crystal Palace	Fulham
15:00 BST	Muniz 52'	Report	Schlupp 87'	Stadium: Craven Cottage; Attendance: 24,142; Referee: Stuart Attwell

6 May 2024 36	Crystal Palace	4–0	Manchester United	Selhurst
20:00 BST	Olise 12', 66'; Mateta 40'; Mitchell 58'	Report		Stadium: Selhurst Park; Attendance: 25,190; Referee: Jarred Gillett
Note: Fixture was initially scheduled for 4 May, but was moved for live Sky Sports broadcast.

11 May 2024 37	Wolverhampton Wanderers	1–3	Crystal Palace	Wolverhampton
15:00 BST	Cunha 66'	Report	Olise 26'; Mateta 28'; Eze 73'; Ahamada (yellow card) 82' (yellow-red card) 85'	Stadium: Molineux Stadium; Attendance: 31,424; Referee: Thomas Bramall

19 May 2024 38	Crystal Palace	5–0	Aston Villa	Selhurst
16:00 BST	Mateta 9', 39', 63'; Eze 54', 69'	Report		Stadium: Selhurst Park; Attendance: 25,191; Referee: Darren Bond

=== FA Cup ===
The Eagles entered the FA Cup in the third round, and were drawn at home to Everton.

Win Draw Loss Fixtures

4 January 2024 Third round	Crystal Palace	0–0	Everton	Selhurst
20:00 GMT		Report	Calvert-Lewin (red card) 79'	Stadium: Selhurst Park; Attendance: 24,489; Referee: Chris Kavanagh

17 January 2024 Third round replay	Everton	1–0	Crystal Palace	Liverpool
19:45 GMT	Gomes 42'	Report		Stadium: Goodison Park; Attendance: 37,796; Referee: Tony Harrington

=== EFL Cup ===
The Eagles entered the EFL Cup in the second round, and were drawn away to Plymouth Argyle. They were then drawn away to Manchester United in the third round.

Win Draw Loss Fixtures

29 August 2023 Second round	Plymouth Argyle	2–4	Crystal Palace	Plymouth
19:45 BST	Waine 6'; Cundle 46'	Report	Édouard 58'; Mateta 61', 62', 83'	Stadium: Home Park; Attendance: 15,826; Referee: Dean Whitestone

26 September 2023 Third round	Manchester United	3–0	Crystal Palace	Trafford
20:00 BST	Garnacho 21'; Casemiro 27'; Martial 55'	Report		Stadium: Old Trafford; Attendance: 72,842; Referee: Michael Salisbury

== Statistics ==
=== Appearances ===
As of 19 May 2024

No.	Pos	Nat	Player	Total		Premier League		FA Cup		EFL Cup	
No.	Pos	Nat	Player	Apps	Goals	Apps	Goals	Apps	Goals	Apps	Goals
Goalkeepers
1	GK	(England) ENG	Sam Johnstone	23	0	20	0	1	0	1+1	0
30	GK	(England) ENG	Dean Henderson	20	0	18	0	1	0	1	0
31	GK	(England) ENG	Remi Matthews	1	0	0+1	0	0	0	0	0
Defenders
2	DF	(England) ENG	Joel Ward	26	0	23+3	0	0	0	0	0
3	DF	(England) ENG	Tyrick Mitchell	41	2	37	2	2	0	2	0
4	DF	(England) ENG	Rob Holding	1	0	0	0	0	0	1	0
5	DF	(England) ENG	James Tomkins	5	0	0+4	0	0	0	1	0
6	DF	(England) ENG	Marc Guéhi	29	0	23+2	0	2	0	0+2	0
12	DF	(Colombia) COL	Daniel Muñoz	16	0	16	0	0	0	0	0
16	DF	(Denmark) DEN	Joachim Andersen	40	2	38	2	2	0	0	0
17	DF	(England) ENG	Nathaniel Clyne	23	0	14+5	0	2	0	2	0
26	DF	(United States) USA	Chris Richards	30	1	23+3	1	2	0	2	0
Midfielders
8	MF	(Colombia) COL	Jefferson Lerma	30	1	27	1	2	0	1	0
10	MF	(England) ENG	Eberechi Eze	31	11	24+3	11	2	0	0+2	0
11	MF	(Brazil) BRA	Matheus França	12	0	1+9	0	1+1	0	0	0
15	MF	(Ghana) GHA	Jeffrey Schlupp	33	2	17+12	2	2	0	1+1	0
19	MF	(England) ENG	Will Hughes	33	0	23+7	0	1+1	0	0+1	0
20	MF	(England) ENG	Adam Wharton	16	0	15+1	0	0	0	0	0
28	MF	(Mali) MLI	Cheick Doucouré	12	0	11	0	0	0	1	0
29	MF	(France) FRA	Naouirou Ahamada	23	0	0+20	0	0+2	0	1	0
44	MF	(Netherlands) NED	Jaïro Riedewald	12	0	2+7	0	0+1	0	2	0
52	MF	(England) ENG	David Ozoh	12	0	0+9	0	0+2	0	0+1	0
Forwards
7	FW	(France) FRA	Michael Olise	19	10	14+5	10	0	0	0	0
9	FW	(Ghana) GHA	Jordan Ayew	37	4	30+5	4	0	0	1+1	0
14	FW	(France) FRA	Jean-Philippe Mateta	39	19	25+10	16	1+1	0	2	3
22	FW	(France) FRA	Odsonne Édouard	33	8	17+13	7	1+1	0	1	1
23	FW	(England) ENG	Malcolm Ebiowei	0	0	0	0	0	0	0	0
49	FW	(England) ENG	Jesurun Rak-Sakyi	8	0	0+6	0	0	0	2	0
