= Malcolm Ebiowei =

English footballer (born 2003)

Personal information
- Full name: Malcolm Perewari Ebiowei
- Date of birth: 4 September 2003 (age 23)
- Place of birth: Lambeth, England
- Height: 1.85 m (6 ft 1 in)
- Positions: Winger; forward

Team information
- Current team: Crawley Town
- Number: 7

Youth career
- 2009–2015: Chelsea
- 2015–2019: Arsenal
- 2020–2021: Rangers
- 2021–2022: Derby County

Senior career*
Years	Team	Apps	(Gls)
2022	Derby County	16	(1)
2022–2025	Crystal Palace	3	(0)
2023	→ Hull City (loan)	12	(0)
2024	→ RWD Molenbeek (loan)	5	(0)
2024–2025	→ Oxford United (loan)	4	(0)
2025	Blackpool	3	(0)
2026–	Crawley Town	0	(0)

International career^{‡}
2018	Netherlands U15	2	(0)
2018	England U16	1	(0)
2022	England U20	3	(0)
- * Club domestic league appearances and goals as of 16:06, 4 September 2025 (UTC) ‡ National team caps and goals as of 20:25, 27 September 2022 (UTC)

Malcolm Perewari Ebiowei (born 4 September 2003) is an English professional footballer who plays as a winger or forward for EFL League Two club Crawley Town.

== Club career ==
Initially signed by Chelsea at the age of five, Ebiowei would go on to represent the Arsenal and Rangers academies. He joined Derby County in 2021.

Ebiowei made his senior debut on 8 February 2022 when he came on as a substitute in the 93rd minute of a 3–1 win against Hull City, replacing Luke Plange. On 30 April 2022, Ebiowei scored a first senior goal when he gave already relegated Derby the lead in a 2–0 victory away at Blackpool.

On 26 June 2022, Ebiowei agreed to join Premier League club Crystal Palace on a five-year contract from the expiration of his Derby County contract on 1 July. He made his club debut in the opening match of the 2022–23 season as an 86th-minute substitute for Eberechi Eze.

On 19 January 2023, Ebiowei joined Hull City on loan for the remainder of the 2022–23 season.

On 1 February 2024, Ebiowei joined Belgian Pro League club RWD Molenbeek on loan for the remainder of the season.

On 2 August 2024, Ebiowei joined EFL Championship club Oxford United on a season long loan. On 3 January 2025 this loan deal was cut short and he returned to Crystal Palace.

On 5 August 2025, he joined EFL League One club Blackpool on a two-year deal, with an option to extend for a further year.

A month later on 4 September 2025, it was announced that he had left Blackpool by mutual consent after making four appearances.

After being without a club for the remainder of the 2025/26 season, in July 2026 Ebiowei signed a two-year deal with EFL League Two club Crawley Town.

== International career ==
Ebiowei is of Nigerian descent and has represented the Netherlands and England at youth international level. He featured in two under-15 games for the Netherlands, both against Italy, and one game for the England under-16s against Turkey.

On 21 September 2022, Ebiowei made his England U20 debut as a substitute during a 3–0 victory over Chile at the Pinatar Arena.

== Career statistics ==
=== Club ===
As of match played 2 November 2024.

Appearances and goals by club, season and competition
Club	Season	League			FA Cup		EFL Cup		Other		Total	
Club	Season	Division	Apps	Goals	Apps	Goals	Apps	Goals	Apps	Goals	Apps	Goals
Derby County	2021–22	Championship	16	1	0	0	0	0	0	0	16	1
Crystal Palace	2022–23	Premier League	3	0	0	0	2	0	—		5	0
Hull City (loan)	2022–23	Championship	12	0	0	0	0	0	—		12	0
RWD Molenbeek (loan)	2023–24	Belgian Pro League	5	0	—		—		—		5	0
Oxford United (loan)	2024–25	Championship	4	0	0	0	2	0	0	0	6	0
Career total			40	1	0	0	4	0	0	0	44	1
