= Jean-Philippe Mateta =

French footballer (born 1997)

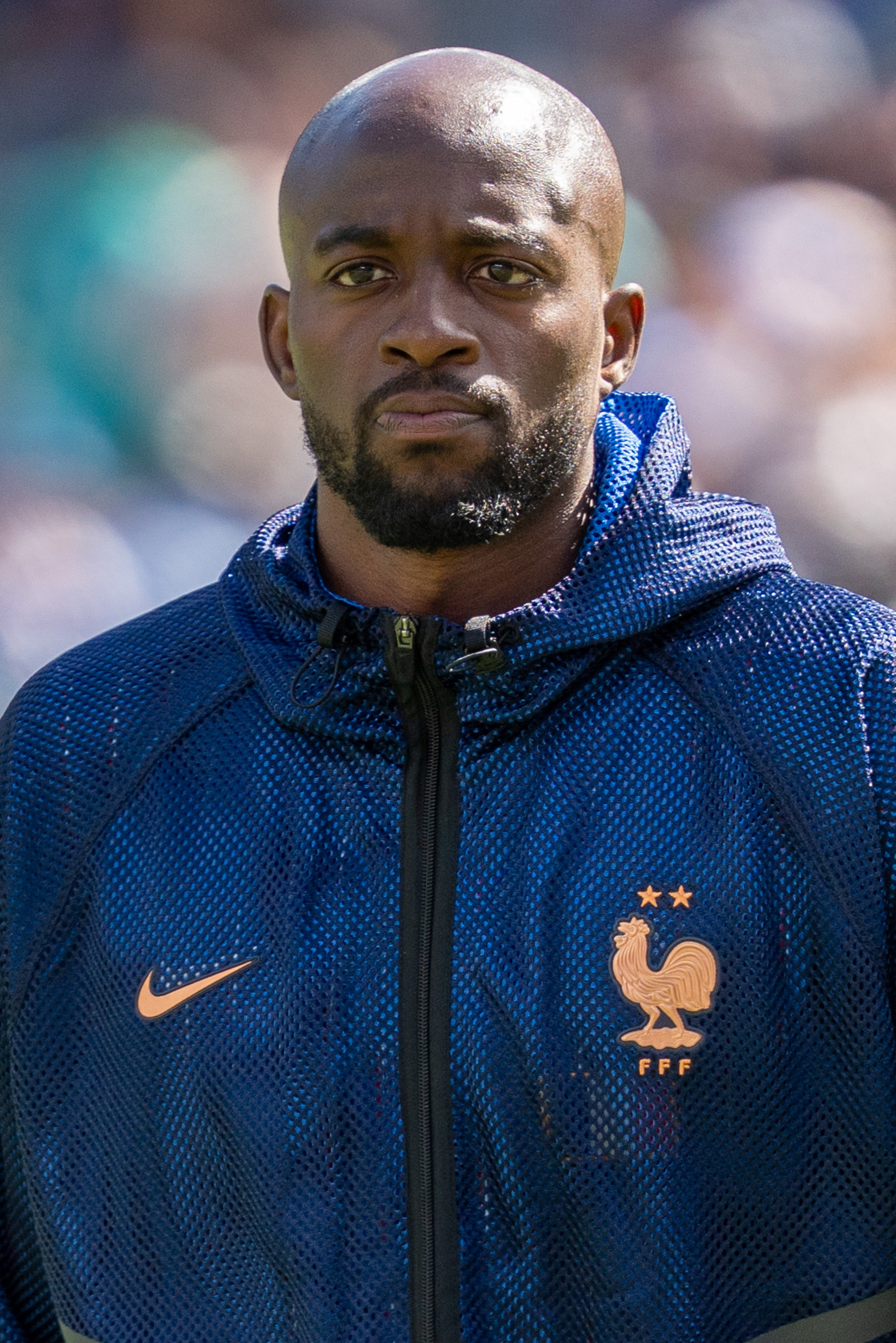
- Mateta with France in 2026

Personal information
- Full name: Jean-Philippe Mateta
- Date of birth: 28 June 1997 (age 29)
- Place of birth: Sevran, Seine-Saint-Denis, France
- Height: 1.92 m (6 ft 4 in)
- Position: Striker

Team information
- Current team: Crystal Palace
- Number: 14

Youth career
- 2006–2010: Olympique de Sevran
- 2010–2011: Sevran
- 2011–2014: Drancy
- 2014–2015: Châteauroux

Senior career*
Years	Team	Apps	(Gls)
2015–2016	Châteauroux II	13	(7)
2015–2016	Châteauroux	26	(13)
2016–2017	Lyon II	16	(6)
2016–2018	Lyon	2	(0)
2017–2018	→ Le Havre (loan)	35	(17)
2018–2022	Mainz 05	67	(24)
2021–2022	→ Crystal Palace (loan)	14	(2)
2022–	Crystal Palace	152	(48)

International career^{‡}
2017	France U19	3	(1)
2018–2019	France U21	11	(3)
2024	France Olympic	8	(7)
2025–	France	7	(2)
Medal record
Men's football
Representing France
Olympic Games
Silver medal – second place	2024	Team
- * Club domestic league appearances and goals as of 14:05, 8 November 2026 (UTC) ‡ National team caps and goals as of 22:05, 9 July 2026 (UTC)

Jean-Philippe Mateta (born 28 June 1997) is a French professional footballer who plays as a striker for Premier League club Crystal Palace and the France national team.

Mateta began his career with Châteauroux before signing for Ligue 1 side Lyon in 2016. Following a successful loan to second division side Le Havre, he signed for Bundesliga club Mainz 05 in 2018. He joined Crystal Palace in 2021, where he won the FA Cup and FA Community Shield in 2025, as well as the UEFA Conference League in 2026, scoring the winning goal in the final.

Mateta represented France internationally at under-19 and under-21 youth levels, as well as in their Olympic team in Paris 2024, finishing as third-highest scorer of the tournament and winning a silver medal. He made his senior debut in 2025, and was part of the squad that finished fourth at the 2026 FIFA World Cup.

== Early life ==
Jean-Philippe Mateta was born on 28 June 1997 in Sevran, a commune in the department of Seine-Saint-Denis which lies in the northeastern suburbs of Paris. His father, a native of the Democratic Republic of the Congo, is a former professional footballer who played in Congo and Liège, Belgium.

== Club career ==
=== Lyon ===
In September 2016, Mateta signed for Ligue 1 side Lyon from Châteauroux on a five-year contract for a fee of €2 million with a further €3 million possible in bonuses. His former club also retained a 20% sell-on clause on the player. Mateta made his debut for the Ligue 1 side on 21 September 2016 against Montpellier, replacing Maxwel Cornet after 76 minutes in a 5–1 home win. He played his next match four months later in the Coupe de France, again coming on for Cornet against Montpellier, in the 76th minute of a 5–0 home win. He made his first Ligue 1 start against Monaco on 23 April 2017. He played 65 minutes, before being replaced by Mathieu Valbuena in a 2–1 home loss.

In July 2017, he joined Ligue 2 side Le Havre on a season-long loan. Mateta scored 19 goals in 37 Ligue 2 matches across the 2017–18 season.

=== Mainz 05 ===
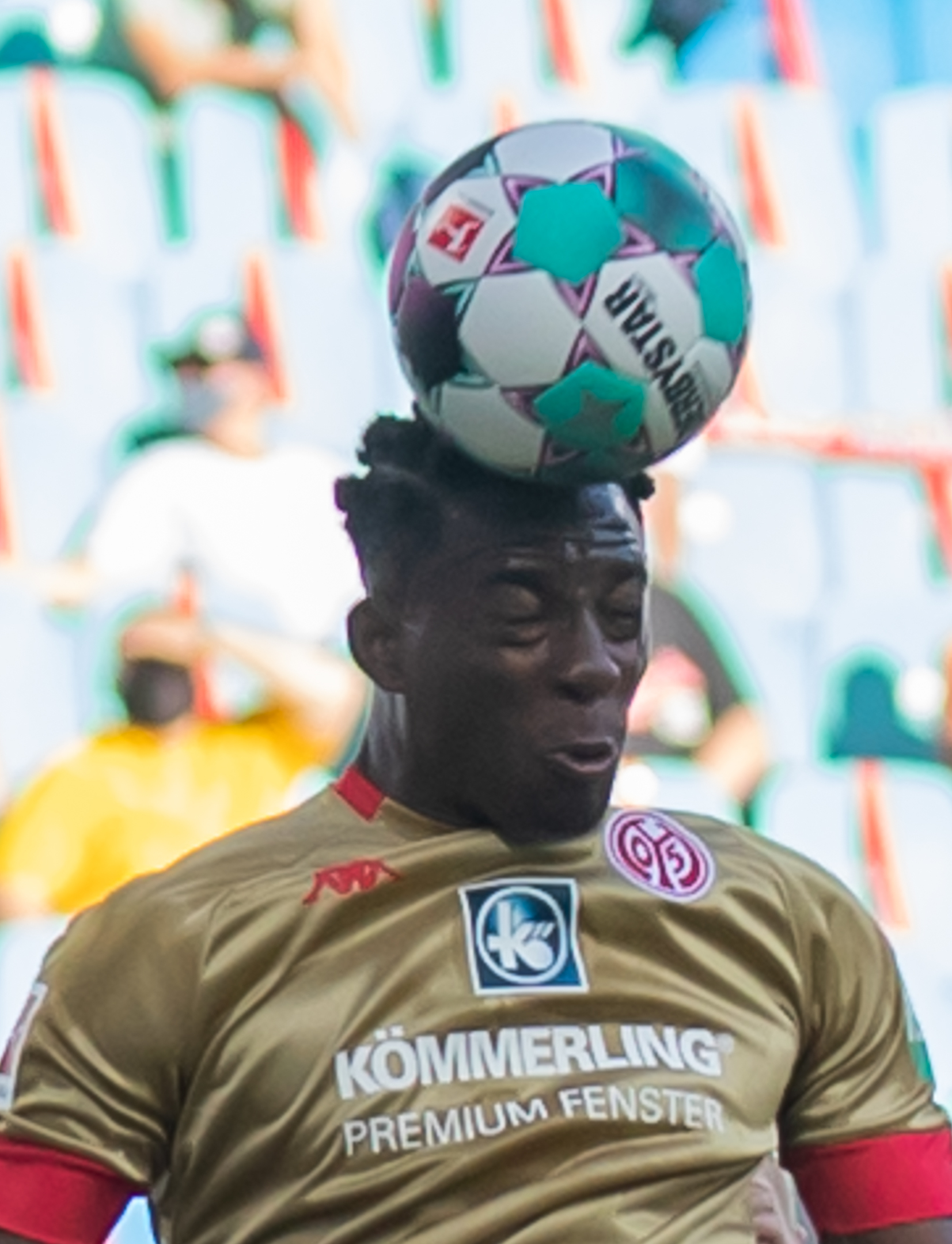
Mateta playing for Mainz 05 in 2020

On 29 June 2018, Mateta joined Bundesliga club Mainz 05 on a four-year contract. His arrival was the most expensive signing in club history. Upon signing with the club, the player was compared favorably to former Mainz strikers Aristide Bancé and Adam Szalai as well as former 1. FC Köln and 1899 Hoffenheim player Anthony Modeste.

On 5 April 2019, Mateta scored his first senior hat-trick in a 5–0 league victory over SC Freiburg.

=== Crystal Palace ===
==== 2021–2023: Initial seasons ====
On 21 January 2021, Mateta signed for English club Crystal Palace on an initial eighteen-month loan deal. Crystal Palace reportedly paid a €3 million loan fee and secured an option to sign Mateta permanently for a further €15 million. He made his debut on 8 February in a 2–0 away league defeat by Leeds United. On 22 February 2021, Mateta scored his first goal for Palace, a backheel flick, in a 2–1 away league win over rivals Brighton & Hove Albion. The deal was made permanent on 31 January 2022.

During the 2022–23 season, Mateta was restricted to just six starts in the league, with Odsonne Édouard preferred as Crystal Palace's starting striker. On 1 April 2023, Mateta came off the bench scored a last-minute winner against Leicester City, ensuring Palace ended their thirteen-match Premier League winless run on Roy Hodgson's return to the club, and ended a personal run of 28 appearances without a goal.

==== 2023–24 season: Crystal Palace Player of the Year ====
Mateta opened his account for the 2023–24 season on 29 August, scoring his first hat-trick for Crystal Palace against Plymouth Argyle in the second round of the 2023–24 EFL Cup, resulting in a 4–2 victory. After scoring in back-to-back games against Manchester City and Liverpool in December 2023, Mateta was restored to the starting line-up following the appointment of manager Oliver Glasner in February 2024. He scored four times in Glasner's first six matches in charge, taking his tally for the season into double digits, making it his highest-scoring season at Crystal Palace.

In April 2024, he scored back-to-back braces in wins against West Ham United and Newcastle United; he was later nominated for Premier League Player of the Month for the first time in his career. On 6 May, he scored in a 4–0 win over Manchester United, becoming the first Premier League player to score in each of a manager's first six home games for a club since Alan Shearer for Kevin Keegan in 1997, as well as Crystal Palace's first ever player to score in six consecutive top-flight home games, breaking Mark Bright's record of five. The next day, Mateta was named the club's Player of the Year, becoming the first French recipient of the award. On 19 May, Mateta scored his first Premier League hat-trick for the club, and the club's second ever Premier League hat-trick and first in nine years, in a 5–0 victory over Aston Villa, helping secure a top half of the table finish. Additionally, he finished the season as his club's top scorer with 16 goals, achieving a new personal best in the Premier League.

==== 2024–25 season: FA Cup title ====
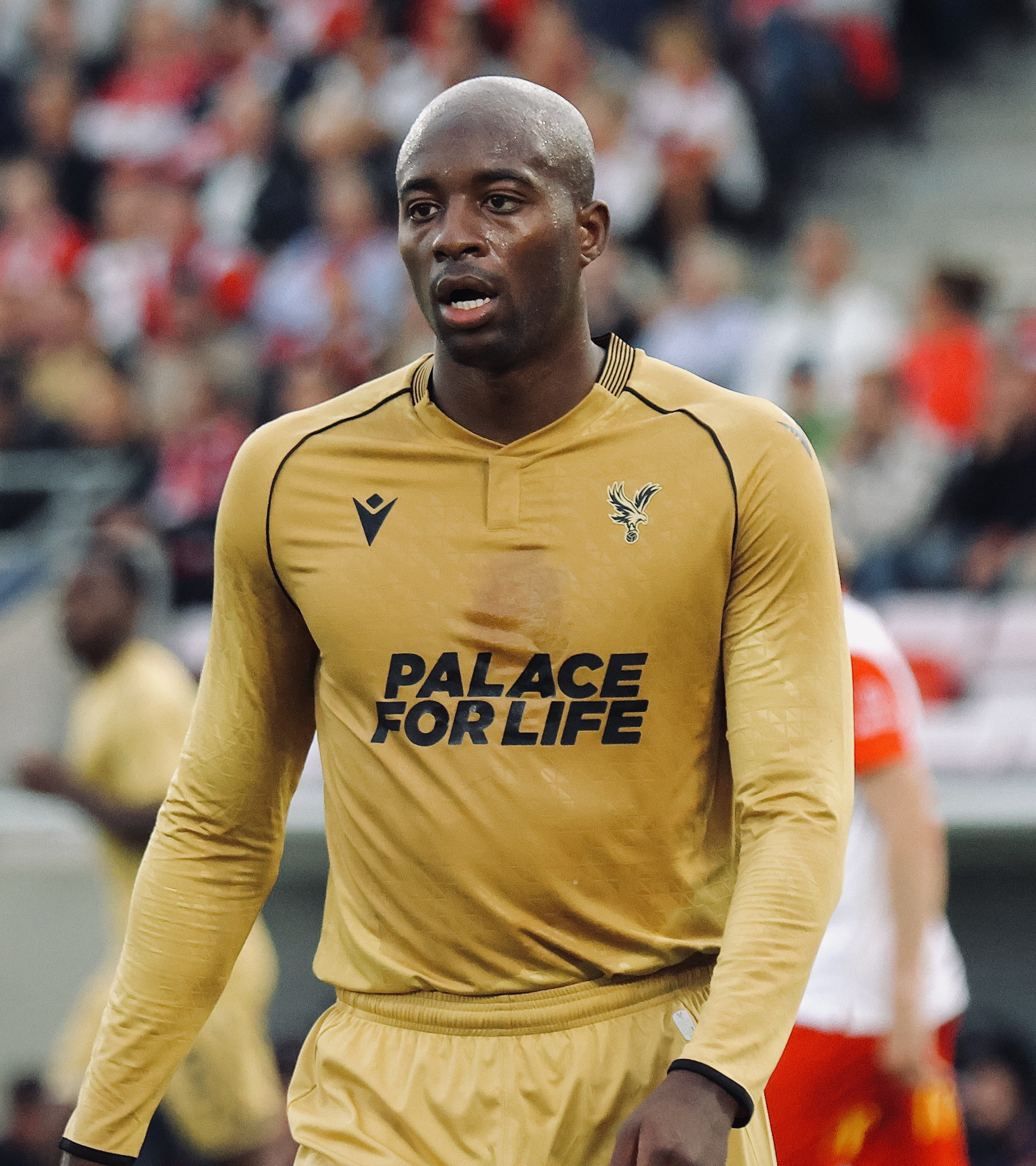
Mateta with Crystal Palace in 2025

Mateta's first goals of the 2024–25 season came in a 4–0 win over Norwich City in the second round of the EFL Cup on 27 August 2024. He assisted Daichi Kamada's opening goal in the second minute, before scoring twice in the second half. On 14 September, he registered his first goals of the Premier League season in a 2–2 draw with Leicester City.

On 27 October, Mateta scored the only goal of a 1–0 win over Tottenham Hotspur, giving Palace their first league win of the season. On 3 December, he repeated this feat by scoring the decisive goal of a 1–0 win at Ipswich Town, Palace's second win of the Premier League season.

After registering only four league goals in the first half of the season, Mateta scored eight goals in the first eight fixtures of 2025. This run started with an 82nd-minute equaliser in a 1–1 draw at home to Chelsea and included braces against West Ham United and Manchester United in consecutive 2–0 away wins. On 25 February, he scored his 36th Premier League goal for Crystal Palace in a 4–1 win over Aston Villa, making him the club's all-time second-top scorer in the competition.

On 1 March 2025, Mateta was hospitalised after being kicked in the side of the head by Millwall goalkeeper Liam Roberts, as he challenged for the ball outside the box in the FA Cup, an incident for which Roberts received a red card. Roberts was later given a six game ban, which had been extended from an initial three game ban. While Mateta was being treated on the pitch for a number of minutes and administered oxygen, some Millwall supporters chanted "let him die". The injury sustained during the game, resulted with him requiring 25 stitches for a laceration behind his ear and a concussion observation. Crystal Palace chairman, Steve Parish, accused Roberts of endangering the life of a "fellow professional" and manager Oliver Glasner claimed the foul "could have been the end of JP's career". Millwall manager Alex Neil insisted Roberts had not intended to hurt Mateta and wished him the best in his recovery. Mateta discussed the injury in an interview later that month with L'Équipe, saying that he had the instinct to turn his head at the last moment, saving himself from a more serious injury, but that his "ear didn't look like an ear anymore"; and that a plastic surgeon had taken pictures of his ear, but refused to show them to him due to the grisly nature of the injury, but that the surgeon managed to save his ear. Mateta said that while he would be able to begin training, he would need to wear a mask to protect his ear and, so as to help prevent infection, wash it every time he sweated. He also said that Roberts had apologised to him by text for causing the injury and that the French striker had told him not to worry and that the injury was "not that serious".

On 17 May 2025, Mateta won the FA Cup as Crystal Palace beat Manchester City 1–0 in the 2025 FA Cup final for Crystal Palace's first major trophy; he linked up with Daichi Kamada and Daniel Muñoz to set up Eberechi Eze's winning goal in the 16th minute of the game.

==== 2025–26 season: Community Shield and Conference League titles ====
On 10 August 2025, Mateta scored his first goal at Wembley, an equaliser from the penalty spot against Liverpool in the 2025 FA Community Shield; he later scored his penalty in the resulting shootout as Palace triumphed following a 2–2 draw, winning his second trophy with the club. On 21 August, he netted his club’s historic first goal in European competitions, securing a 1–0 win over Fredrikstad in the UEFA Conference League play-off round. On 18 October, Mateta scored a hat-trick, two goals of which were scored in a five-minute period, in a 3–3 draw with Bournemouth. Mateta was strongly linked with a move to Serie A club AC Milan in the January transfer window of 2026, however the move collapsed after issues with his medical caused by a reported knee injury. Later that season, on 17 May, he featured in his 200th match with the club in a 2–2 away draw with Brentford. On 27 May, he netted the only goal in a 1–0 victory over Rayo Vallecano in the Conference League final, securing his club's first ever European title.

== International career ==
Mateta with France at the 2026 FIFA World Cup

On 3 June 2024, Mateta was named in manager Thierry Henry's provisional France squad ahead of the Olympic Games in Paris. Selected in the final squad as one of the three overage players, he scored the only goal in the quarter-final game against Argentina to send France to the next stage. During the semi-final against Egypt, he scored two goals as France won 3–1. He scored a 93rd-minute equaliser in the final against Spain to take the match to extra-time, though Spain won 5–3.

On 2 October 2025, Mateta received his first call-up to the senior team for 2026 FIFA World Cup qualification matches. On 10 October, he made his international debut in a 3–0 victory over Azerbaijan. Three days later, he scored his first goal in a 2–2 away draw against Iceland.

On 14 May 2026, Mateta was named in the French squad for the World Cup. On 26 June, Mateta made his World Cup debut, coming on as a substitute in the 87th minute during France's 4-1 victory over Norway in their final match of the group stage.

== Career statistics ==
=== Club ===
As of match played 5 November 2026

Appearances and goals by club, season and competition
Club	Season	League			National cup (Note: Includes Coupe de France, DFB-Pokal, FA Cup)		League cup (Note: Includes Coupe de la Ligue, EFL Cup)		Europe		Other		Total	
Club	Season	Division	Apps	Goals	Apps	Goals	Apps	Goals	Apps	Goals	Apps	Goals	Apps	Goals
Châteauroux II	2014–15	Championnat de France Amateur 2	6	0	—		—		—		—		6	0
Châteauroux II	2015–16	Championnat de France Amateur 2	7	7	—		—		—		—		7	7
Châteauroux II	Total		13	7	—		—		—		—		13	7
Châteauroux	2015–16	Championnat National	22	11	0	0	0	0	—		—		22	11
Châteauroux	2016–17	Championnat National	4	2	—		1	3	—		—		5	5
Châteauroux	Total		26	13	—		1	3	—		—		27	16
Lyon II	2016–17	Championnat de France Amateur	16	6	—		—		—		—		16	6
Lyon	2016–17	Ligue 1	2	0	1	0	—		0	0	—		3	0
Le Havre (loan)	2017–18	Ligue 2	35	17	1	1	0	0	—		2 (Note: Appearances in Ligue 1 relegation/promotion play-offs)	2	38	20
Mainz 05	2018–19	Bundesliga	34	14	2	0	—		—		—		36	14
Mainz 05	2019–20	Bundesliga	18	3	0	0	—		—		—		18	3
Mainz 05	2020–21	Bundesliga	15	7	2	3	—		—		—		17	10
Mainz 05	Total		67	24	4	3	—		—		—		71	27
Crystal Palace	2020–21	Premier League	7	1	—		—		—		—		7	1
Crystal Palace	2021–22	Premier League	22	5	5	2	1	0	—		—		28	7
Crystal Palace	2022–23	Premier League	29	2	1	0	2	0	—		—		32	2
Crystal Palace	2023–24	Premier League	35	16	2	0	2	3	—		—		39	19
Crystal Palace	2024–25	Premier League	37	14	5	0	4	3	—		—		46	17
Crystal Palace	2025–26	Premier League	32	12	0	0	3	0	14 (Note: Appearances in UEFA Conference League)	3	1 (Note: Appearance in FA Community Shield)	1	50	16
Crystal Palace	2026–27	Premier League	4	0	0	0	0	0	2 (Note: Appearances in UEFA Europa League)	1	—		6	1
Crystal Palace	Total		166	50	13	2	12	6	16	4	1	1	208	63
Career total			325	117	19	6	13	9	16	4	3	3	376	139

=== International ===
As of match played 9 July 2026

Appearances and goals by national team and year
National team	Year	Apps	Goals
France	2025	3	2
France	2026	4	0
Total		7	2

As of match played 9 July 2026
Scores and results list France's goal tally first, score column indicates score after each Mateta goal

List of international goals scored by Jean-Philippe Mateta
No.	Date	Venue	Cap	Opponent	Score	Result	Competition	Ref.
1	13 October 2025	Laugardalsvöllur, Reykjavík, Iceland	2	Iceland	2–1	2–2	2026 FIFA World Cup qualification	
2	16 November 2025	Tofiq Bahramov Republican Stadium, Baku, Azerbaijan	3	Azerbaijan	1–1	3–1	2026 FIFA World Cup qualification	

== Honours ==
Crystal Palace

- FA Cup: 2024–25
- FA Community Shield: 2025
- UEFA Conference League: 2025–26

France Olympic

- Summer Olympics silver medal: 2024

Individual

- Crystal Palace Player of the Season: 2023–24

Orders

- Knight of the National Order of Merit: 2024
