= 2022–23 Crystal Palace F.C. season =

English football club season

Crystal Palace
2022–23 season
- Owners: Steve Parish; Josh Harris; David Blitzer; John Textor
- Chairman: Steve Parish
- Manager: Patrick Vieira (until 17 March); Paddy McCarthy (caretaker, from 17 to 21 March); Roy Hodgson (from 21 March)
- Stadium: Selhurst Park
- Premier League: 11th
- FA Cup: Third round
- EFL Cup: Third round
- Top goalscorer: League: Eberechi Eze (10); All: Eberechi Eze (10)
- Highest home attendance: 25,842 v Liverpool; 25 February 2023
- Lowest home attendance: 20,320 v Southampton; 7 January 2023
- Average home league attendance: 24,975
- Biggest win: 5–1 v Leeds United; 9 April 2023
- Biggest defeat: 0–4 v Tottenham Hotspur; 4 January 2023
Home colours	Away colours	Third colours

The 2022–23 season was the 117th season in the existence of Crystal Palace Football Club and the club's tenth consecutive season in the Premier League (further extending their longest ever spell in the top-flight). In addition to the league, they also competed in the FA Cup and the EFL Cup.

== Season summary ==
=== Pre-season ===
Palace finished the previous season in 12th place and reached the semi-final of the FA Cup, the first under manager Patrick Vieira. Martin Kelly and Cheikhou Kouyaté left at the end of their contracts and player of the season, Conor Gallagher, returned to Chelsea at the end of his loan spell. Malcolm Ebiowei and Sam Johnstone joined after their contracts at Derby and West Bromwich Albion expired while Cheick Doucouré and Chris Richards were signed from Lens and Bayern Munich respectively.

The club went on a pre-season tour to Singapore and Australia to play other Premier League teams; they were defeated by Liverpool and Manchester United and drew against Leeds. Only half the squad were able to make the trip, so there were also games in England against teams from various divisions of the Football League. In these matches Palace won four and drew the other. The whole squad was able to play in a home game against Montpellier, which Palace won 4–2.

=== August ===
Crystal Palace opened the Premier League season with a game against Arsenal at Selhurst Park on Friday 5 August. The visitors started the strongest and took the lead with a goal in the 20th minute from a corner. Palace came back into the game, but squandered a couple of chances to equalise and a late own goal from Marc Guéhi consigned the team to a 2–0 defeat. On the same day, Christian Benteke was sold to D.C. United. Their first away game was a 1–1 draw against Liverpool at Anfield. The next game, at home to Aston Villa, saw the team's first win of the season, with Wilfried Zaha scoring a brace of goals in a 3–1 victory. Palace were drawn away against Oxford United in the second round of the Carabao Cup, winning the tie 2–0 with youth-teamers Killian Phillips and Kaden Rodney making their senior debuts.

== Transfers ==
=== In ===
Date	Pos.	Player	Transferred from	Fee	Ref.
1 July 2022	RW	(England) Malcolm Ebiowei	Derby County	Compensation	
1 July 2022	GK	(England) Sam Johnstone	West Bromwich Albion	Free transfer	
11 July 2022	DM	(Mali) Cheick Doucouré	(France) Lens	Undisclosed	
18 July 2022	DM	(Northern Ireland) Cormac Austin	(Northern Ireland) Linfield	Undisclosed	
27 July 2022	CB	(United States) Chris Richards	(Germany) Bayern Munich	Undisclosed	
11 August 2022	CB	(Northern Ireland) Kofi Balmer	(Northern Ireland) Larne	Undisclosed	
1 September 2022	LB	(Nigeria) Kelvin Agho	(Nigeria) Hypebuzz Academy	Undisclosed	
31 January 2023	MF	(France) Naouirou Ahamada	(Germany) VfB Stuttgart	Undisclosed	
2 February 2023	CF	(Republic of Ireland) Franco Umeh-Chibueze	(Republic of Ireland) Cork City	Undisclosed	
16 February 2023	DM	(Scotland) Dylan Reid	(Scotland) St Mirren	Undisclosed	

=== Out ===
Date	Pos.	Player	Transferred to	Fee	Ref.
30 June 2022	CM	(Senegal) Cheikhou Kouyaté	Unattached (Note: Kouyaté later joined Nottingham Forest)	Released	
30 June 2022	CM	(England) Luke Dreher	Unattached	Released	
30 June 2022	CB	(Poland) Jarosław Jach	Unattached (Note: Jach later joined Zagłębie Lubin)	Released	
30 June 2022	AM	(United States) Rian Jamai	Unattached	Released	
30 June 2022	CB	(England) Kanye Jobson	Unattached	Released	
30 June 2022	CM	(England) Nya Kirby	Unattached	Released	
30 June 2022	RB	(England) Martin Kelly	Unattached (Note: Kelly later joined West Bromwich Albion)	Released	
30 June 2022	MF	(England) Joseph Ling	Unattached	Released	
30 June 2022	RB	(England) Sean Robertson	Unattached (Note: Robertson later joined Forest Green Rovers)	Released	
30 June 2022	AM	(Wales) Sion Spence	Unattached (Note: Spence later joined Gloucester City)	Released	
30 June 2022	DM	(Northern Ireland) Aidan Steele	Unattached	Released	
30 June 2022	DM	(Wales) James Taylor	Unattached	Released	
30 June 2022	RB	(England) Dylan Thiselton	Unattached	Released	
5 August 2022	CF	(Belgium) Christian Benteke	(United States) D.C. United	Undisclosed	
7 September 2022	LB	(England) Lion Bello	Colchester United	Free Transfer	

=== Loans in ===
Date	Pos.	Player	Loaned from	On loan until	Ref.
31 January 2023	CM	(Belgium) Albert Sambi Lokonga	Arsenal	End of Season	

=== Loans out ===
Date	Pos.	Player	Loaned to	On loan until	Ref.
16 July 2022	LB	(England) Reece Hannam	Bromley	January 2023 (Note: Hannam initially joined Bromley on a season-long loan, but returned to Crystal Palace in January.)	
27 July 2022	LB	(Republic of Ireland) Tayo Adaramola	Coventry City	2 September 2022 (Note: Adaramola initially joined Coventry on a season-long loan, but returned to Crystal Palace on 2 September.)	
27 July 2022	GK	(England) Remi Matthews	(Scotland) St Johnstone	End of season	
8 August 2022	RW	(Scotland) Scott Banks	Bradford City	End of season	
11 August 2022	LW	(England) Jesurun Rak-Sakyi	Charlton Athletic	End of season	
12 August 2022	DM	(England) Malachi Boateng	(Scotland) Queen's Park	End of season	
25 August 2022	CB	(England) Daniel Quick	Dorking Wanderers	13 January 2023 (Note: Quick initially joined Dorking on a season-long loan, but returned to Crystal Palace on 13 January and was immediately loaned out to Billericay.)	
26 August 2022	CB	(Republic of Ireland) Jake O'Brien	(Belgium) RWD Molenbeek	End of season	
26 August 2022	FW	(England) Luke Plange	(Belgium) RWD Molenbeek	30 January 2023 (Note: Plange initially joined RWD Molenbeek on a season-long loan, but returned to Crystal Palace on 30 January and was immediately loaned out to Lincoln.)	
1 September 2022	RB	(England) David Boateng	(Scotland) Queen's Park	27 January 2023 (Note: Boateng initially joined Queen's Park on a season-long loan, but returned to Crystal Palace on 27 January and was immediately loaned out to Dover.)	
1 September 2022	CF	(England) Rob Street	Shrewsbury Town	End of season	
12 September 2022	LB	(Nigeria) Kelvin Agho	(Slovakia) ŠTK 1914 Šamorín	End of season	
1 January 2023	DM	(Republic of Ireland) Killian Phillips	Shrewsbury Town	End of season	
6 January 2023	GK	(England) Jack Butland	Manchester United	End of season	
13 January 2023	FW	(England) John-Kymani Gordon	Carlisle United	End of season	
13 January 2023	CB	(England) Daniel Quick	Billericay Town	End of Season	
19 January 2023	RW	(England) Malcolm Ebiowei	Hull City	End of Season	
25 January 2023	CB	(England) Ryan Bartley	Eastbourne Borough	End of Season	
27 January 2023	RB	(England) David Boateng	Dover Athletic	End of Season	
30 January 2023	CF	(England) Luke Plange	Lincoln City	End of Season	

== Pre-season and friendlies ==
Palace announced they would visit Singapore, for a friendly against Liverpool, and Australia with matches against Manchester United and Leeds United. They also played a home friendly against French side Montpellier. Two further friendlies were confirmed, against Accrington Stanley and Millwall behind-closed-doors. An away trip to Queens Park Rangers was scheduled for 23 July. A further addition, against Gillingham was later confirmed.

During the mid-season winter break for the 2022 FIFA World Cup, Palace announced they would host Botafogo and Valladolid in December. Two further fixtures against Napoli and Trabzonspor was also confirmed for the Eagles.

Win Draw Loss Fixtures

2 July 2022 Friendly	Crystal Palace	1–1	Accrington Stanley	Beckenham
13:00 BST	Mateta 22'	Report	Lowe 49'	Stadium: Crystal Palace Training Ground; Attendance: 0 (behind-closed-doors)

9 July 2022 Friendly	Crystal Palace	5–4	Millwall	Beckenham
13:00 BST	Eze 3'; Ayew 18'; O'Brien 64'; Benteke 67'; Rak-Sakyi 82'	Report	Afobe 6', 35'; Cresswell 76'; Flemming 81'	Stadium: Crystal Palace Training Ground; Attendance: 0 (behind-closed-doors)

15 July 2022 Friendly	Crystal Palace	0–2	Liverpool	Kallang, Singapore
20:35 SGT		Report	Henderson 13'; Salah 46'	Stadium: National Stadium; Attendance: 50,217; Referee: Muhammad Taqi

16 July 2022 Friendly	Crystal Palace	4–2	Ipswich Town	Beckenham
11:00 BST	Plange 9', 12', 57'; Benteke 42'	Report	Ball 70'; Aluko 79'	Stadium: Crystal Palace Training Ground; Attendance: 0 (behind-closed-doors)

19 July 2022 Friendly	Crystal Palace	1–3	Manchester United	Melbourne, Australia
20:10 AEST	Ward 74'	Report	Martial 17'; Rashford 48'; Sancho 59'; Fish (red card) 84'	Stadium: Melbourne Cricket Ground; Attendance: 76,499; Referee: Alex King

19 July 2022 Friendly	Gillingham	2–3	Crystal Palace	Gillingham
19:00 BST	Lee 50', 67'	Report	Zaha 13', 72'; Benteke 23'	Stadium: MEMS Priestfield Stadium; Attendance: 3,033; Referee: Chris Pollard

22 July 2022 Friendly	Crystal Palace	1–1	Leeds United	Perth, Australia
18:05 AWST	Mateta 67'	Report	Rodrigo 55' (pen.)	Stadium: Optus Stadium; Attendance: 33,919; Referee: Daniel Elder

23 July 2022 Friendly	Queens Park Rangers	0–3	Crystal Palace	White City, London
15:00 BST		Report	Eze 28'; Zaha 51', 79' (pen.)	Stadium: Loftus Road

30 July 2022 Friendly	Crystal Palace	4–2	Montpellier	Selhurst
15:00 BST	Zaha 23'; Édouard 32', 44'; Guéhi 49'	Report	Mavididi 65', 82'	Stadium: Selhurst Park

3 December 2022 Friendly	Crystal Palace	0–0	Botafogo	Selhurst
12:30 GMT	Zaha (penalty missed) 36'	Report		Stadium: Selhurst Park

7 December 2022 Winter Football Series	Trabzonspor	2–2	Crystal Palace	Belek, Turkey
18:00 TRT	Trézéguet 3'; Bozok 23'	Report	Édouard 7'; Mateta 63'	Stadium: Regnum Carya

11 December 2022 Winter Football Series	Napoli	3–1	Crystal Palace	Belek, Turkey
18:00 TRT	Osimhen 35'; Raspadori 65', 82'	Report	Zaha 33'	Stadium: Regnum Carya; Referee: Raşit Yorgancılar

16 December 2022 Friendly	Crystal Palace	2–1	Valladolid	Selhurst
18:00 GMT	Zaha 56', 75' (pen.)	Report	León 32'	Stadium: Selhurst Park

== Competitions ==
=== Overall record ===
Competition	First match	Last match	Starting round	Final position	Record							
Competition	First match	Last match	Starting round	Final position	Pld	W	D	L	GF	GA	GD	Win %
Premier League	5 August 2022	28 May 2023	Matchday 1	11th	38	11	12	15	40	49	−9	28.95
FA Cup	7 January 2023		Third round	Third round	1	0	0	1	1	2	−1	0.00
EFL Cup	23 August 2022	9 November 2022	Second round	Third round	2	1	1	0	2	0	+2	50.00
Total					41	12	13	16	43	51	−8	29.27

Source: Soccerway

=== Premier League ===
==== League table ====
Pos	Team	Pld	W	D	L	GF	GA	GD	Pts
9	Brentford	38	15	14	9	58	46	+12	59
10	Fulham	38	15	7	16	55	53	+2	52
11	Crystal Palace	38	11	12	15	40	49	−9	45
12	Chelsea	38	11	11	16	38	47	−9	44
13	Wolverhampton Wanderers	38	11	8	19	31	58	−27	41

Source: Premier League
Rules for classification: 1) Points; 2) Goal difference; 3) Goals scored; 4) If the champions, relegated teams or qualified teams for UEFA competitions cannot be determined by rules 1 to 3, rules 4.1 to 4.3 are applied – 4.1) Points gained in head-to-head record between such teams; 4.2) Away goals scored in head-to-head record between such teams; 4.3) Play-offs

==== Results summary ====
Overall								Home						Away					
Pld	W	D	L	GF	GA	GD	Pts	W	D	L	GF	GA	GD	W	D	L	GF	GA	GD
38	11	12	15	40	49	−9	45	7	7	5	21	23	−2	4	5	10	19	26	−7

Source: Premier League

==== Results by round ====
Round	1	2	3	4	5	6	7	8	9	10	11	12	13	14	15	16	17	18	19	20	21	22	23	24	25	26	27	28	29	30	31	32	33	34	35	36	37	38
Ground	H	A	H	A	H	A	H (Note: Match 7 was postponed due to the death of Queen Elizabeth II and played between matches 20 and 21)	A (Note: Match 8 was postponed due to an industrial rail strike and played between matches 27 and 28)	H	H	A	H	A	H	A	A	H	A	H	A	H	A	H	A	H	A	H	A	H	A	A	H	A	H	A	H	A	H
Result	L	D	W	L	D	D	D	L	L	W	D	W	L	W	W	L	L	W	L	L	D	L	D	D	D	L	L	L	W	W	W	D	L	W	L	W	D	D
Position	17	16	9	12	13	15	12	16	17	15	13	11	13	10	10	11	11	11	12	12	12	12	12	12	12	12	12	12	12	12	12	12	12	11	12	12	11	11

Source: Premier League
A = Away; H = Home; W = Win; D = Draw; L = Loss; P = Postponed

==== Matches ====
Win Draw Loss Fixtures

On 16 June, the Premier League fixtures were released.

5 August 2022 1	Crystal Palace	0–2	Arsenal	Selhurst
20:00 BST		Report	Martinelli 20'; Guéhi 85' (o.g.)	Stadium: Selhurst Park; Attendance: 25,286; Referee: Anthony Taylor

15 August 2022 2	Liverpool	1–1	Crystal Palace	Liverpool
20:00 BST	Núñez (red card) 57'; Díaz 61'	Report	Zaha 32'	Stadium: Anfield; Attendance: 52,970; Referee: Paul Tierney

20 August 2022 3	Crystal Palace	3–1	Aston Villa	Selhurst
15:00 BST	Zaha 7', 58'; Mateta 71'	Report	Watkins 5'	Stadium: Selhurst Park; Attendance: 22,012; Referee: Andrew Madley

27 August 2022 4	Manchester City	4–2	Crystal Palace	Manchester
15:00 BST	Silva 53'; Haaland 62', 70', 81'	Report	Stones 4' (o.g.); Andersen 21'	Stadium: Etihad Stadium; Attendance: 53,112; Referee: Darren England

30 August 2022 5	Crystal Palace	1–1	Brentford	Selhurst
19:30 BST	Zaha 59'	Report	Wissa 88'	Stadium: Selhurst Park; Attendance: 25,043; Referee: Simon Hooper

3 September 2022 6	Newcastle United	0–0	Crystal Palace	Newcastle upon Tyne
15:00 BST		Report		Stadium: St James' Park; Attendance: 51,863; Referee: Michael Salisbury

1 October 2022 9	Crystal Palace	1–2	Chelsea	Selhurst
15:00 BST	Édouard 7'	Report	Aubameyang 38'; Gallagher 90'	Stadium: Selhurst Park; Attendance: 25,198; Referee: Chris Kavanagh

9 October 2022 10	Crystal Palace	2–1	Leeds United	Selhurst
14:00 BST	Édouard 24'; Eze 76'	Report	Struijk 10'	Stadium: Selhurst Park; Attendance: 25,042; Referee: Paul Tierney

15 October 2022 11	Leicester City	0–0	Crystal Palace	Leicester
12:30 BST		Report		Stadium: King Power Stadium; Attendance: 31,298; Referee: Andrew Madley

18 October 2022 12	Crystal Palace	2–1	Wolverhampton Wanderers	Selhurst
20:15 BST	Eze 47'; Zaha 70'	Report	A. Traoré 31'	Stadium: Selhurst Park; Attendance: 25,574; Referee: David Coote

22 October 2022 13	Everton	3–0	Crystal Palace	Walton
15:00 BST	Calvert-Lewin 11'; Gordon 63'; McNeil 84'	Report		Stadium: Goodison Park; Attendance: 38,939; Referee: Simon Hooper

29 October 2022 14	Crystal Palace	1–0	Southampton	Selhurst
15:00 BST	Édouard 38'	Report		Stadium: Selhurst Park; Attendance: 25,130; Referee: Michael Salisbury

6 November 2022 15	West Ham United	1–2	Crystal Palace	Stratford
14:00 GMT	Benrahma 20'	Report	Zaha 41'; Olise 90+4'	Stadium: London Stadium; Attendance: 62,451; Referee: Paul Tierney

12 November 2022 16	Nottingham Forest	1–0	Crystal Palace	West Bridgford
15:00 GMT	Gibbs-White 54'	Report		Stadium: City Ground; Attendance: 29,045; Referee: John Brooks

Mid-season break for 2022 FIFA World Cup

26 December 2022 17	Crystal Palace	0–3	Fulham	Selhurst
15:00 BST	Mitchell (red card) 34'; Tomkins (yellow card) 20' (yellow-red card) 57'	Report	Decordova-Reid 31'; Ream 71'; Mitrović 80'	Stadium: Selhurst Park; Attendance: 25,176; Referee: Andrew Madley

31 December 2022 18	Bournemouth	0–2	Crystal Palace	Kings Park
15:00 GMT		Report	Ayew 19'; Eze 36'	Stadium: Vitality Stadium; Attendance: 9,972; Referee: Andre Marriner

4 January 2023 19	Crystal Palace	0–4	Tottenham Hotspur	Selhurst
20:00 GMT		Report	Kane 48', 53'; Doherty 68'; Son 72'	Stadium: Selhurst Park; Attendance: 25,132; Referee: Michael Oliver

15 January 2023 20	Chelsea	1–0	Crystal Palace	Fulham
14:00 GMT	Havertz 64'	Report		Stadium: Stamford Bridge; Attendance: 40,075; Referee: Peter Bankes

18 January 2023 7	Crystal Palace	1–1	Manchester United	Selhurst
20:00 GMT	Olise 90+1'	Report	Fernandes 43'	Stadium: Selhurst Park; Attendance: 23,343; Referee: Robert Jones
Note: The match was originally scheduled for 11 September 2022, but was postponed as a mark of respect following the passing of Queen Elizabeth II.

21 January 2023 21	Crystal Palace	0–0	Newcastle United	Selhurst
17:30 GMT		Report		Stadium: Selhurst Park; Attendance: 25,350; Referee: Craig Pawson

4 February 2023 22	Manchester United	2–1	Crystal Palace	Manchester
15:00 GMT	Fernandes 7' (pen.); Rashford 62'; Casemiro (red card) 70'	Report	Schlupp 76'	Stadium: Old Trafford; Attendance: 73,420; Referee: Andre Marriner

11 February 2023 23	Crystal Palace	1–1	Brighton & Hove Albion	Selhurst
15:00 GMT	Tomkins 69'	Report	March 63'	Stadium: Selhurst Park; Attendance: 24,827; Referee: Michael Oliver

18 February 2023 24	Brentford	1–1	Crystal Palace	Brentford
15:00 GMT	Janelt 90+6'	Report	Eze 69'	Stadium: Brentford Community Stadium; Attendance: 17,122; Referee: Paul Tierney

25 February 2023 25	Crystal Palace	0–0	Liverpool	Selhurst
19:45 GMT		Report		Stadium: Selhurst Park; Attendance: 25,842; Referee: Darren England

4 March 2023 26	Aston Villa	1–0	Crystal Palace	Aston
15:00 GMT	Andersen 27' (o.g.)	Report	Doucouré (yellow card) 57' (yellow-red card) 62'	Stadium: Villa Park; Attendance: 41,893; Referee: Craig Pawson

11 March 2023 27	Crystal Palace	0–1	Manchester City	Selhurst
17:30 GMT		Report	Haaland 78' (pen.)	Stadium: Selhurst Park; Attendance: 25,844; Referee: Robert Jones

15 March 2023 8	Brighton & Hove Albion	1–0	Crystal Palace	Falmer
19:30 GMT	March 15'	Report		Stadium: Falmer Stadium; Attendance: 30,933; Referee: Peter Bankes
Note: The match was originally scheduled for 17 September 2022, but was postponed due to an industrial rail strike.

19 March 2023 28	Arsenal	4–1	Crystal Palace	Holloway
14:00 GMT	Martinelli 28'; Saka 43', 74'; Xhaka 55'	Report	Schlupp 63'	Stadium: Emirates Stadium; Attendance: 60,247; Referee: Stuart Attwell

1 April 2023 29	Crystal Palace	2–1	Leicester City	Selhurst
15:00 BST	Iversen 59' (o.g.); Mateta 90+4'	Report	Pereira 56'	Stadium: Selhurst Park; Attendance: 25,143; Referee: Tim Robinson

9 April 2023 30	Leeds United	1–5	Crystal Palace	Leeds
14:00 BST	Bamford 21'	Report	Guéhi 45+1'; Ayew 53', 77'; Eze 55'; Édouard 69'	Stadium: Elland Road; Attendance: 36,427; Referee: Simon Hooper

15 April 2023 31	Southampton	0–2	Crystal Palace	Southampton
15:00 BST		Report	Eze 54', 68'	Stadium: St Mary's Stadium; Attendance: 30,309; Referee: Michael Oliver

22 April 2023 32	Crystal Palace	0–0	Everton	Selhurst
15:00 BST		Report	Holgate (yellow card) 37' (yellow-red card) 80'	Stadium: Selhurst Park; Attendance: 25,202; Referee: John Brooks

25 April 2023 33	Wolverhampton Wanderers	2–0	Crystal Palace	Wolverhampton
19:30 BST	Andersen 3' (o.g.); Neves 90+4' (pen.)	Report		Stadium: Molineux Stadium; Attendance: 30,792; Referee: Robert Jones

29 April 2023 34	Crystal Palace	4–3	West Ham United	Selhurst
12:45 BST	Ayew 15'; Zaha 20'; Schlupp 30'; Eze 66' (pen.)	Report	Souček 9'; Antonio 35'; Aguerd 72'	Stadium: Selhurst Park; Attendance: 25,148; Referee: Craig Pawson
Note: The match was originally scheduled to kick-off at 12:30 BST, but was delayed 15 minutes due to issues with ticket barriers.

6 May 2023 35	Tottenham Hotspur	1–0	Crystal Palace	Tottenham
15:00 BST	Kane 45+1'	Report		Stadium: Tottenham Hotspur Stadium; Attendance: 61,093; Referee: Darren England

13 May 2023 36	Crystal Palace	2–0	Bournemouth	Selhurst
15:00 BST	Eze 39', 58'	Report		Stadium: Selhurst Park; Attendance: 25,034; Referee: Michael Salisbury

20 May 2023 37	Fulham	2–2	Crystal Palace	Fulham
15:00 BST	Mitrović 45+5' (pen.), 61'	Report	Édouard 34'; Ward 83'	Stadium: Craven Cottage; Attendance: 24,356; Referee: Josh Smith

28 May 2023 38	Crystal Palace	1–1	Nottingham Forest	Selhurst
16:30 BST	Hughes 66'	Report	Awoniyi 31'	Stadium: Selhurst Park; Attendance: 25,198; Referee: Thomas Bramall

=== FA Cup ===
Palace joined the FA Cup at the third round stage, and were drawn at home to Southampton.

Win Draw Loss Fixtures

7 January 2023 Third round	Crystal Palace	1–2	Southampton	Selhurst
12:30 GMT	Édouard 14'	Report	Ward-Prowse 37'; A. Armstorng 68'	Stadium: Selhurst Park; Attendance: 20,320; Referee: Darren Bond

=== EFL Cup ===
Crystal Palace entered the competition in the second round and were drawn away to Oxford United. A 2–0 victory saw them through to the next round, where they were again drawn away, this time to fellow Premier League team Newcastle United. Palace lost this game on a penalty shoot-out after the game finished goalless.

Win Draw Loss Fixtures

23 August 2022 Second round	Oxford United	0–2	Crystal Palace	Littlemore
19:45 BST		Report	Édouard 71'; Milivojević 90' (pen.)	Stadium: The Kassam Stadium; Attendance: 9,564; Referee: Peter Bankes

9 November 2022 Third round	Newcastle United	0–0 (3–2 p)	Crystal Palace	Newcastle upon Tyne
19:45 GMT		Report		Stadium: St James' Park; Attendance: 51,660; Referee: Graham Scott
	Penalties
	Wood (penalty scored); Trippier (penalty scored); Joelinton (penalty scored); Botman (penalty missed); Bruno Guimarães (penalty missed)		(penalty missed) Milivojević; (penalty scored) Hughes; (penalty scored) Ward; (penalty missed) Mateta; (penalty missed) Ebiowei

== Statistics ==
=== Appearances ===
As of 15 May 2023

No.	Pos	Nat	Player	Total		Premier League		FA Cup		EFL Cup	
No.	Pos	Nat	Player	Apps	Goals	Apps	Goals	Apps	Goals	Apps	Goals
Goalkeepers
13	GK	(Spain) ESP	Vicente Guaita	28	0	27	0	1	0	0	0
21	GK	(England) ENG	Sam Johnstone	9	0	7	0	0	0	2	0
41	GK	(England) ENG	Joe Whitworth	2	0	2	0	0	0	0	0
Defenders
2	DF	(England) ENG	Joel Ward	28	1	22+4	1	1	0	1	0
3	DF	(England) ENG	Tyrick Mitchell	36	0	32+2	0	0	0	1+1	0
5	DF	(England) ENG	James Tomkins	7	1	3+3	1	0	0	1	0
6	DF	(England) ENG	Marc Guéhi	38	1	35	1	1	0	2	0
16	DF	(Denmark) DEN	Joachim Andersen	31	1	30	1	1	0	0	0
17	DF	(England) ENG	Nathaniel Clyne	25	0	19+3	0	1	0	2	0
26	DF	(United States) USA	Chris Richards	10	0	4+5	0	0	0	1	0
78	DF	(England) ENG	Kaden Rodney	1	0	0	0	0	0	1	0
Midfielders
4	MF	(Serbia) SRB	Luka Milivojević	21	1	5+13	0	0+1	0	2	1
7	MF	(France) FRA	Michael Olise	35	2	26+6	2	1	0	2	0
8	MF	(Belgium) BEL	Albert Sambi Lokonga	9	0	6+3	0	0	0	0	0
10	MF	(England) ENG	Eberechi Eze	38	10	28+8	10	0+1	0	0+1	0
15	MF	(Ghana) GHA	Jeffrey Schlupp	36	3	30+4	3	0+1	0	0+1	0
18	MF	(Scotland) SCO	James McArthur	3	0	0+3	0	0	0	0	0
19	MF	(England) ENG	Will Hughes	28	1	5+20	1	1	0	2	0
23	MF	(England) ENG	Malcolm Ebiowei	5	0	0+3	0	0	0	0+2	0
28	MF	(Mali) MLI	Cheick Doucouré	33	0	32	0	1	0	0	0
29	MF	(France) FRA	Naouirou Ahamada	7	0	0+7	0	0	0	0	0
44	MF	(Netherlands) NED	Jaïro Riedewald	6	0	0+5	0	0	0	0+1	0
55	MF	(Republic of Ireland) IRL	Killian Phillips	1	0	0	0	0	0	1	0
77	MF	(England) ENG	David Ozoh	1	0	0+1	0	0	0	0	0
Forwards
9	FW	(Ghana) GHA	Jordan Ayew	39	4	29+7	4	1	0	1+1	0
11	FW	(Ivory Coast) CIV	Wilfried Zaha	28	7	27	7	1	0	0	0
14	FW	(France) FRA	Jean-Philippe Mateta	30	2	6+21	2	0+1	0	2	0
22	FW	(France) FRA	Odsonne Édouard	35	6	18+15	4	1	1	1	1

=== Goalscorers ===
The list is sorted by shirt number when total goals are equal.

Rnk	Pos	No.	Player	Premier League	FA Cup	EFL Cup	Total
1	MF	10	(England) Eberechi Eze	10	0	0	10
2	FW	11	(Ivory Coast) Wilfried Zaha	7	0	0	7
2	FW	22	(France) Odsonne Édouard	5	1	1	7
4	FW	9	(Ghana) Jordan Ayew	4	0	0	4
5	MF	15	(Ghana) Jeffrey Schlupp	3	0	0	3
6	MF	7	(France) Michael Olise	2	0	0	2
6	FW	14	(France) Jean-Philippe Mateta	2	0	0	2
8	DF	2	(England) Joel Ward	1	0	0	1
8	MF	4	(Serbia) Luka Milivojević	0	0	1	1
8	DF	5	(England) James Tomkins	1	0	0	1
8	DF	6	(England) Marc Guehi	1	0	0	1
8	DF	16	(Denmark) Joachim Andersen	1	0	0	1
8	MF	19	(England) Will Hughes	1	0	0	1
–			Own goal	2	0	0	2
Total				40	1	2	43

Last updated: 20 May 2023.
Source: 11v11.com

=== Clean sheets ===
The list is sorted by shirt number when total clean sheets are equal.

Rank	No.	Player	Premier League	FA Cup	EFL Cup	Total
1	13	(Spain) Vicente Guaita	6	0	0	6
2	21	(England) Sam Johnstone	3	0	2	5
Total			9	0	2	11

Last updated: 15 May 2023.
Source: premierleague.com
