= Chris Richards (soccer) =

American soccer player (born 2000)

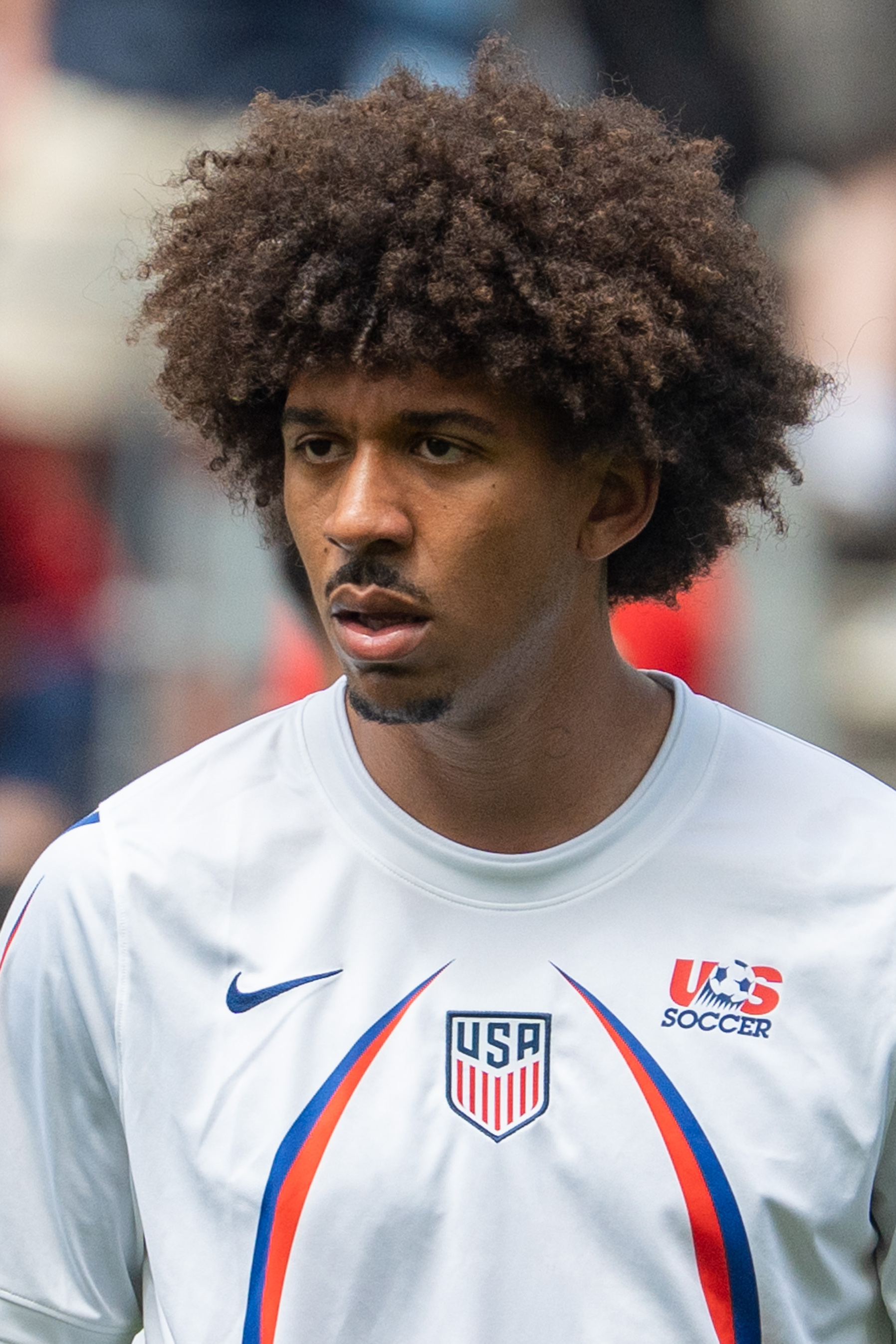
- Richards with the United States in 2026

Personal information
- Full name: Christopher Jeffrey Richards
- Date of birth: March 28, 2000 (age 26)
- Place of birth: Birmingham, Alabama, U.S.
- Height: 6 ft 2 in (1.88 m)
- Position: Center-back

Team information
- Current team: Crystal Palace
- Number: 26

Youth career
- 2016–2017: Texans SC Houston
- 2017–2019: FC Dallas
- 2018–2019: → Bayern Munich (loan)

Senior career*
Years	Team	Apps	(Gls)
2019–2021	Bayern Munich II	38	(4)
2020–2022	Bayern Munich	5	(0)
2021	→ TSG Hoffenheim (loan)	11	(0)
2021–2022	→ TSG Hoffenheim (loan)	19	(1)
2022–	Crystal Palace	101	(3)

International career^{‡}
2018–2019	United States U20	12	(1)
2019	United States U23	2	(0)
2020–	United States	45	(4)
Medal record
Representing United States
Men's football
CONCACAF Gold Cup
Runner-up	2025 Canada–United States
CONCACAF Nations League
Winner	2023 United States
Winner	2024 United States
- * Club domestic league appearances and goals as of November 1, 2026 ‡ National team caps and goals as of November 17, 2026

Christopher Jeffrey Richards (born March 28, 2000) is an American professional soccer player who plays as a center-back for Premier League club Crystal Palace and the United States national team.

Richards began his career as a youth player for FC Dallas and moved to the youth academy of Bayern Munich in 2018, signing professionally with them one year later. He played for the club's reserve team before being promoted to the senior squad in 2020, going on loan spells to TSG Hoffenheim. He was signed by Premier League club Crystal Palace in July 2022, where he won the 2024–25 FA Cup, the club's first major trophy, and the 2025–26 UEFA Conference League, the club's first European title.

Featuring in several youth levels for his country, Richards received his first senior call-up for the United States in 2020. He won the CONCACAF Nations League in 2023, scoring in the final, and 2024. He was also named the U.S. Soccer Player of the Year for 2025.

== Club career ==
=== FC Dallas ===
Richards was raised in Hoover, Alabama, and played youth soccer for Hoover SC. In 2016, he was cut from a trial with FC Dallas Academy and instead joined Texans SC in Houston. He then rejoined FC Dallas Academy in 2017.

On April 12, 2018, Richards signed a professional contract with FC Dallas.

=== Bayern Munich ===
In May 2018, Richards, with his FC Dallas colleague Thomas Roberts, went to a 10-day trial at FC Bayern Munich as part of an agreement between the two clubs. As a result of his performance during the trial, in July he was offered a one-year loan with the German club.

On July 21, 2018, Richards debuted for the Bayern senior team at the 2018 International Champions Cup, replacing Sandro Wagner in the 62nd minute of the 3–1 win against Paris Saint-Germain F.C. During the 2018–19 season, he spent time with Bayern München U19s, becoming a team regular starter and being praised for his aerial abilities and his passing skills. On January 19, 2019, Richards signed a $1.5 million permanent contract with FC Bayern Munich. On August 19, 2019, he made his professional debut when he started for FC Bayern Munich II at the 3. Liga in a 2–1 away win against Hallescher FC. He made 30 appearances and scoring 4 goals for Bayern II in a team that won the 3. Liga.

On June 20, 2020, Richards made his Bundesliga debut in a 3–1 victory over Freiburg. On September 18, he made his first appearance of the 2020–21 Bundesliga season in Bayern's opening match against Schalke 04. He made his first start for Bayern against Hertha BSC on October 4, in which he assisted a Robert Lewandowski goal in the 51st minute of a 4–3 win.

On November 25, 2020, Richards made his UEFA Champions League debut for Bayern in a 3–1 victory over Red Bull Salzburg. He left the game in the 79th minute when he was replaced by Javi Martínez. Richards was named to the 2020 IFFHS World Youth (U20) Team.

==== Loan to Hoffenheim ====
On February 1, 2021, Richards joined Bundesliga side TSG Hoffenheim on loan for the remainder of the season. On August 30, he returned to Hoffenheim on a season-long loan deal.

=== Crystal Palace ===
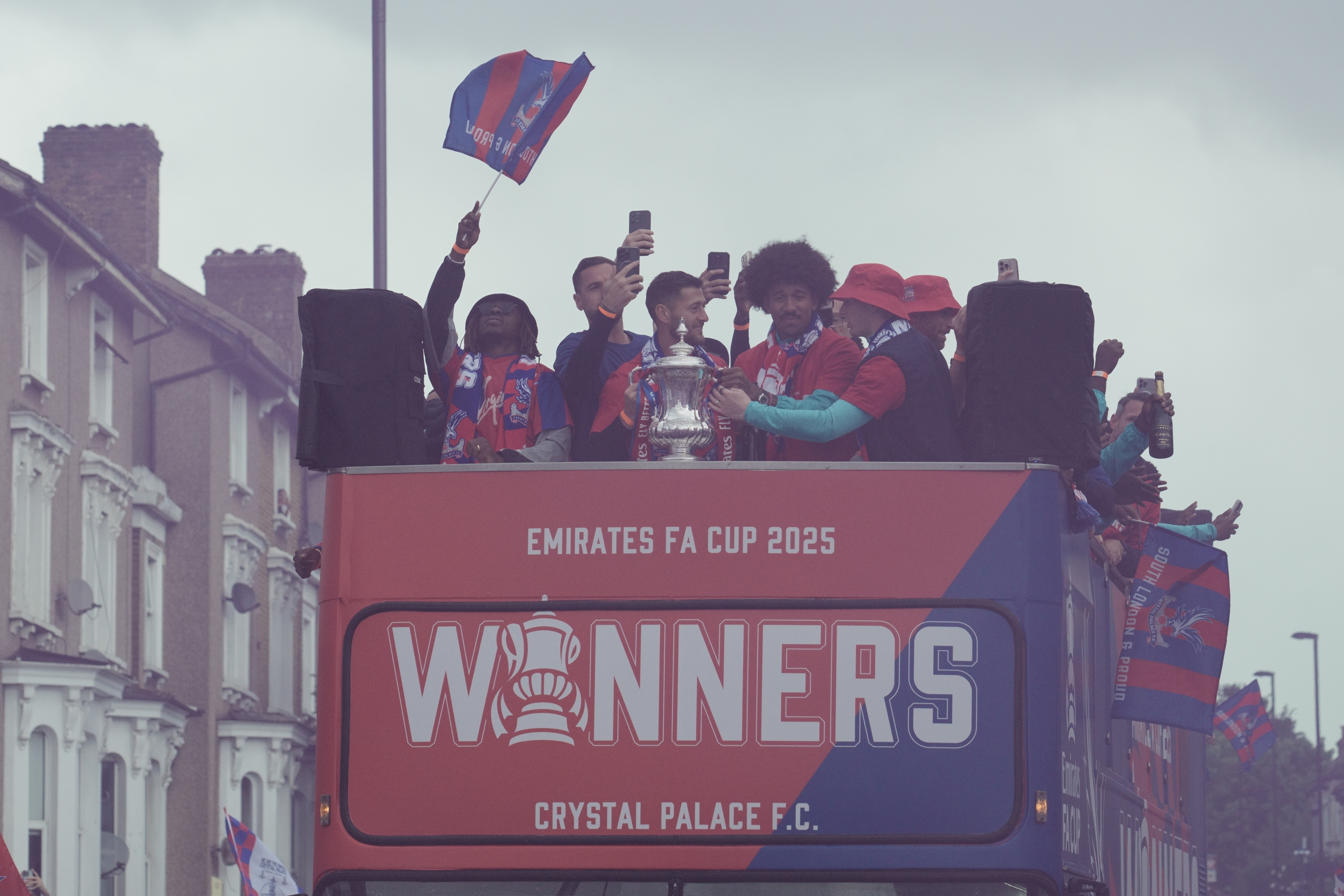
Richards during FA Cup victory parade in 2025

Richards signed a five-year contract with Premier League club Crystal Palace on July 27, 2022, after being transferred from Bayern Munich for a €12 million fee.

After making sporadic appearances in his first season, the 2022–23 campaign, he began to appear more prominently in the following season, 2023–24, initially out of position as a defensive midfielder under Roy Hodgson before shifting to his preferred centre-back position under new manager Oliver Glasner's back three system. He scored his first goal for the club on February 24, opening the scoring in a 3–0 home win over Burnley, with his goal being Palace's first under Glasner in his first match in charge.

At the start of the 2024–25 season, Richards lost his place in the starting line-up to new loan signing Trevoh Chalobah, and was restricted to just six league starts in the first half of the season. However, his playing time increased following Chalobah's recall to Chelsea in January 2025. Richards went on to form an essential part of the back line alongside Marc Guéhi and Maxence Lacroix. He scored his second goal for the club in a 5–2 defeat to Manchester City on April 12. Palace went on to win the 2024–25 FA Cup, their first ever major trophy, and qualify for European competition for the first time; Richards received praise for his defensive shut-out performance in the 1–0 victory against City in the 2025 FA Cup final. He was the only Crystal Palace player to have played every minute of every match in the competition. He also became just the second American to play in and win an FA Cup final, after Tim Howard in 2004.

On May 27, 2026, Richards won the 2025–26 UEFA Conference League, the club's first ever European trophy. He became the first American to win the competition, completing the trifecta of Americans winning all three major European trophies after Jovan Kirovski won the UEFA Champions League in 1997 and Timothy Chandler won the UEFA Europa League in 2022.

He scored his first European goal in the 4–0 win over Lech Poznań in the 2026–27 UEFA Europa League.

== International career ==
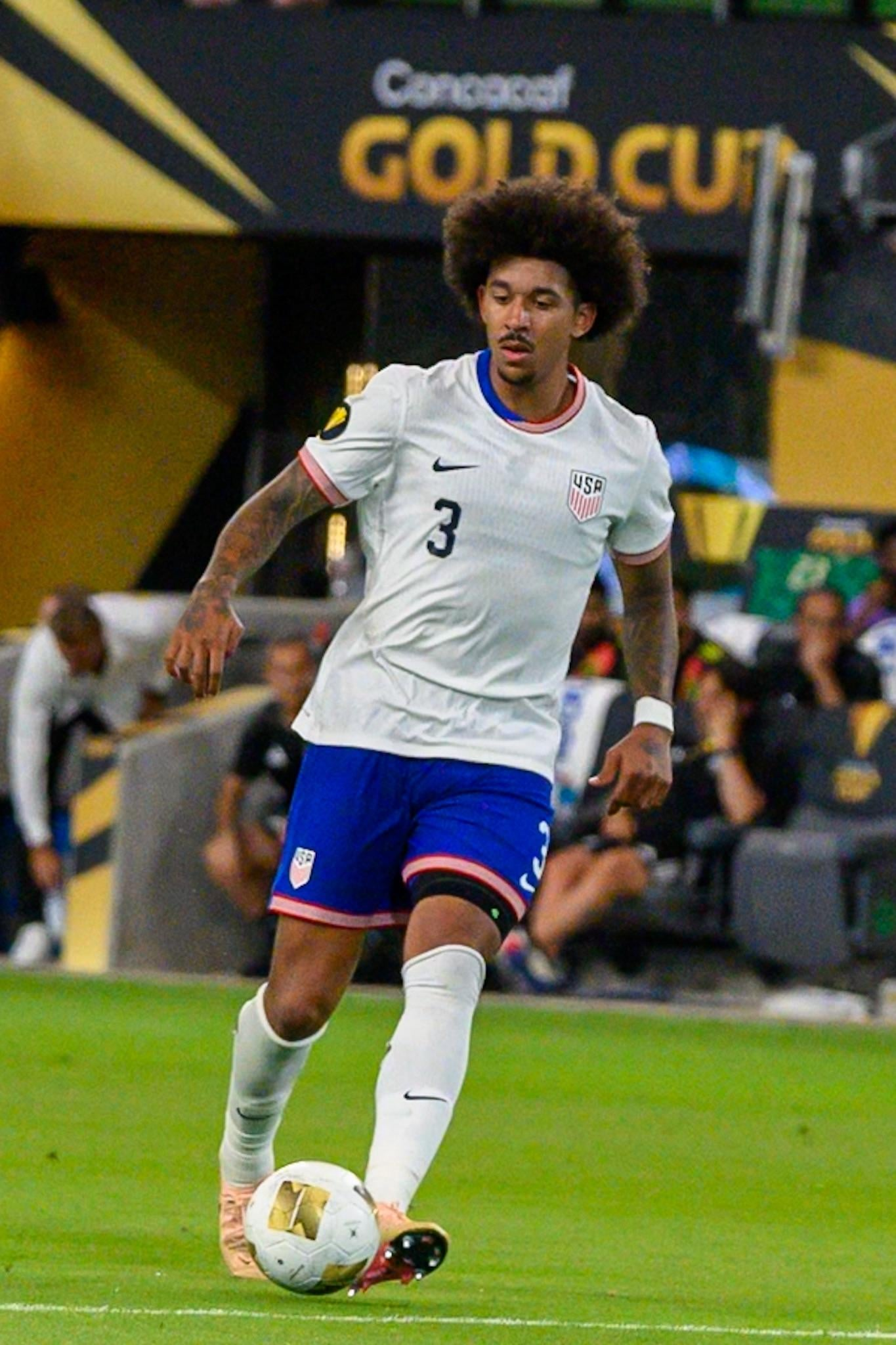
Richards with the United States in 2025

In January 2018, Richards was called for the MNT Youth National Team Summit Camp, which gathered 153 players from U16, U17, U18, U19 and U20 Youth National Teams. In May 2018, he made his debut for the United States U20 team in a match against Honduras. On November 12, 2018, Richards was called for the 2018 CONCACAF U-20 Championship as one of the three replacements allowed before the beginning of the "Qualification Stage". He, then, started in two of the tournament's three remaining matches, including the final, a 2–0 win, against Mexico. On May 10, 2019, he was included by the coach Tab Ramos in the 21-man squad called to represent the United States at the 2019 FIFA U-20 World Cup. Richards started all of the five matches that the Americans played in the tournament, including the 3–2 win against the heavy favorites, France. Richards played the entire game in all but one of the matches (that against Nigeria).

He received his first call up to the senior United States squad for matches against Wales and Panama in November 2020. He made his national team debut as a late substitute against Panama. Richards missed the 2022 FIFA World Cup due to a hamstring injury. He scored his first goal for his country on June 18, 2023, scoring the first goal of United States' 2–0 win against Canada in the 2023 CONCACAF Nations League final. At the 2025 CONCACAF Gold Cup, Richards was among the few regular U.S. starters in an otherwise inexperienced squad that ultimately finished as runners-up. He scored the winning goal against Saudi Arabia and also scored in the final against Mexico. He was named on the team of the tournament and was praised for his performances.

Richards with the United States at the 2026 FIFA World Cup

On May 26, 2026, Richards was selected in the 26-man squad for the 2026 FIFA World Cup. In the opening 4–1 group stage win over Paraguay, Richards completed a perfect 83 passes with 100% accuracy during the match, the highest by any player in a World Cup since 1966.

== Personal life ==
Richards' father, Ken Richards, played college basketball at Birmingham–Southern College and later professionally in Australia, Bolivia and Iceland.

== Career statistics ==
=== Club ===
As of match played October 31, 2026

Appearances and goals by club, season and competition
Club	Season	League			National cup (Note: Includes DFB-Pokal, FA Cup)		League cup (Note: Includes EFL Cup)		Europe		Other		Total	
Club	Season	Division	Apps	Goals	Apps	Goals	Apps	Goals	Apps	Goals	Apps	Goals	Apps	Goals
Bayern Munich II	2019–20	3. Liga	30	4	—		—		—		—		30	4
Bayern Munich II	2020–21	3. Liga	8	0	—		—		—		—		8	0
Bayern Munich II	Total		38	4	—		—		—		—		38	4
Bayern Munich	2019–20	Bundesliga	1	0	0	0	—		0	0	0	0	1	0
Bayern Munich	2020–21	Bundesliga	3	0	0	0	—		3 (Note: Appearances in UEFA Champions League)	0	1 (Note: Appearance in DFL-Supercup)	0	7	0
Bayern Munich	2021–22	Bundesliga	1	0	1	0	—		—		0	0	2	0
Bayern Munich	Total		5	0	1	0	—		3	0	1	0	10	0
TSG Hoffenheim (loan) (Note: Represents two separate loans for the 2020–21 and 2021–22 respective seasons)	2020–21	Bundesliga	11	0	—		—		2 (Note: Appearances in UEFA Europa League)	0	—		13	0
TSG Hoffenheim (loan)	2021–22	Bundesliga	19	1	2	0	—		—		—		21	1
TSG Hoffenheim (loan)	Total		30	1	2	0	—		2	0	—		34	1
Crystal Palace	2022–23	Premier League	9	0	0	0	1	0	—		—		10	0
Crystal Palace	2023–24	Premier League	26	1	2	0	2	0	—		—		30	1
Crystal Palace	2024–25	Premier League	24	1	6	0	2	0	—		—		32	1
Crystal Palace	2025–26	Premier League	33	1	1	0	2	1	13 (Note: Appearances in UEFA Conference League)	0	1 (Note: Appearance in FA Community Shield)	0	50	2
Crystal Palace	2026–27	Premier League	9	0	0	0	1	0	3	1	—		13	1
Crystal Palace	Total		101	3	9	0	8	1	16	1	1	0	135	5
Career total			174	8	12	0	8	1	21	1	2	0	217	10

=== International ===
As of match played November 17, 2026

Appearances and goals by national team and year
National team	Year	Apps	Goals
United States	2020	1	0
United States	2021	5	0
United States	2022	2	0
United States	2023	6	1
United States	2024	9	0
United States	2025	12	2
United States	2026	10	1
Total		45	4

Scores and results list the United States' goal tally first, score column indicates score after each Richards goal.

List of international goals scored by Chris Richards
No.	Date	Venue	Cap	Opponent	Score	Result	Competition
1	June 18, 2023	Allegiant Stadium, Paradise, United States	10	Canada	1–0	2–0	2023 CONCACAF Nations League final
2	June 19, 2025	Q2 Stadium, Austin, United States	27	Saudi Arabia	1–0	1–0	2025 CONCACAF Gold Cup
3	July 6, 2025	NRG Stadium, Houston, United States	31	Mexico	1–0	1–2	2025 CONCACAF Gold Cup final
4	September 29, 2026	Energizer Park, St. Louis, United States	41	Chile	3–2	4–2	Friendly

== Honors ==
Bayern Munich

- Bundesliga: 2019–20
- DFL-Supercup: 2020, 2021
- UEFA Super Cup: 2020

Crystal Palace

- FA Cup: 2024–25
- FA Community Shield: 2025
- UEFA Conference League: 2025–26

United States U20

- CONCACAF U-20 Championship: 2018

United States

- CONCACAF Nations League: 2022–23, 2023–24

Individual

- IFFHS World Youth (U20) Team: 2020
- CONCACAF Nations League Finals Best XI: 2023
- CONCACAF Gold Cup Best XI: 2025
- U.S. Soccer Player of the Year: 2025
- IFFHS Men's CONCACAF Team of the Year: 2025
