= David Ozoh =

English footballer (born 2005)

Personal information
- Full name: David Ikechukwu Ozoh
- Date of birth: 6 May 2005 (age 21)
- Place of birth: Valencia, Spain
- Height: 1.83 m (6 ft 0 in)
- Position: Central midfielder

Team information
- Current team: Derby County
- Number: 4

Youth career
- 2013–2023: Crystal Palace

Senior career*
Years	Team	Apps	(Gls)
2023–2026	Crystal Palace	10	(0)
2024–2025	→ Derby County (loan)	10	(1)
2025–2026	→ Derby County (loan)	33	(2)
2026–	Derby County	9	(0)

International career^{‡}
2023	England U18	5	(0)
- * Club domestic league appearances and goals as of 22:10, 6 November 2026 (UTC) ‡ National team caps and goals as of 16:21, 11 June 2023 (UTC)

David Ikechukwu Ozoh (born 6 May 2005) is a professional footballer who plays as a central midfielder for club Derby County. Born in Spain, he is a youth international for England.

Starting his career at Crystal Palace, Ozoh made his first team debut in 2023, his first of 13 appearances for Crystal Palace. He spent the 2024–25 and 2025–26 seasons on loan at Derby County, before making the move permanent in September 2026.

== Club career ==
=== Crystal Palace ===
Ozoh joined the Crystal Palace academy at the age of 8. He worked his way up their youth age groups, playing for the U18 and U23 sides. On 11 August 2022, he signed his first professional contract with the club. He made his professional debut for Crystal Palace as a late substitute in a 0–0 Premier League draw with Newcastle United on 21 January 2023, becoming the club's youngest ever debutant in the Premier League at the age of 17. In the 2023–24 season, Ozoh played 12 times for the first team.

==== Derby County (loan) ====
On 24 July 2024, Ozoh joined Derby County of the Championship on loan until the end of the 2024–25 season. On 9 August 2024, he made his debut for the club in a 2–4 loss against Blackburn Rovers in the league. Ozoh scored his first goal for Derby in 89th minute of a 3–0 win to Bristol City on 31 August 2024, this was also first goal in senior football. Ozoh had made a strong start to his time at Derby, but picked up a hamstring injury against Cardiff City on 14 September 2024 which left him sidelined for a few weeks. Upon his return to training from this injury, Ozoh damaged his quad which was expected to leave him unable to play until after the November international break which would mean he would miss two-and-a-half months with both injuries. Ozoh returned in January 2025, however in February 2025 he sustained a thigh injury against Millwall which ended his season, Ozoh made 10 appearances during his loan spell at Derby, scoring once.

On 29 July 2025, Ozoh returned to Derby County on a further season-long loan, for the duration of the 2025–26 season. He scored his first goal since returning to the club on 21 October 2025, the winner in a 1–0 home win over Norwich City. Ozoh would be ruled for two 11 matches over a two month period after sustaining a thigh injury at Blackburn Rovers, before returning in an FA Cup tie against Leeds United. Ozoh made 35 appearances, scoring twice in his second season at Derby County. At the end of the season Derby head coach John Eustace stated his desire for the Ozoh to return to Derby on a permanent deal.

=== Derby County ===
On 1 September 2026, Ozoh joined Derby County on a permanent transfer, signing a five-year contract. He made his debut as a permanent Derby County player as 22nd minute substitute for Rhian Brewster in a 3–0 defeat to West Ham United.

== International career ==
Ozoh was born in Valencia, Spain to Nigerian parents and moved to England at a young age. He was called up to the England U18s in March 2023 and made his debut during a 2–1 win over Croatia in Medulin on 22 March 2023.

== Career statistics ==
As of match played 8 November 2026

Appearances and goals by club, season and competition
Club	Season	League			FA Cup		League Cup		Other		Total	
Club	Season	Division	Apps	Goals	Apps	Goals	Apps	Goals	Apps	Goals	Apps	Goals
Crystal Palace U21	2022–23	—			—		—		3 (Note: Appearances in EFL Trophy)	0	3	0
Crystal Palace U21	2023–24	—			—		—		3	0	3	0
Crystal Palace U21	Total		—		—		—		6	0	6	0
Crystal Palace	2022–23	Premier League	1	0	0	0	0	0	—		1	0
Crystal Palace	2023–24	Premier League	9	0	2	0	1	0	—		12	0
Crystal Palace	Total		10	0	2	0	1	0	—		13	0
Derby County (loan)	2024–25	Championship	10	1	0	0	2	0	—		12	1
Derby County (loan)	2025–26	Championship	33	2	1	0	1	0	—		35	2
Derby County (loan)	Total		43	3	1	0	3	0	—		47	3
Derby County	2026–27	Championship	10	0	0	0	—		—		10	0
Career total			63	3	3	0	4	0	6	0	76	3

== Honours ==
Individual

- Crystal Palace Under-21s Player of the Season: 2022–23
