= Eberechi Eze =

English footballer (born 1998)

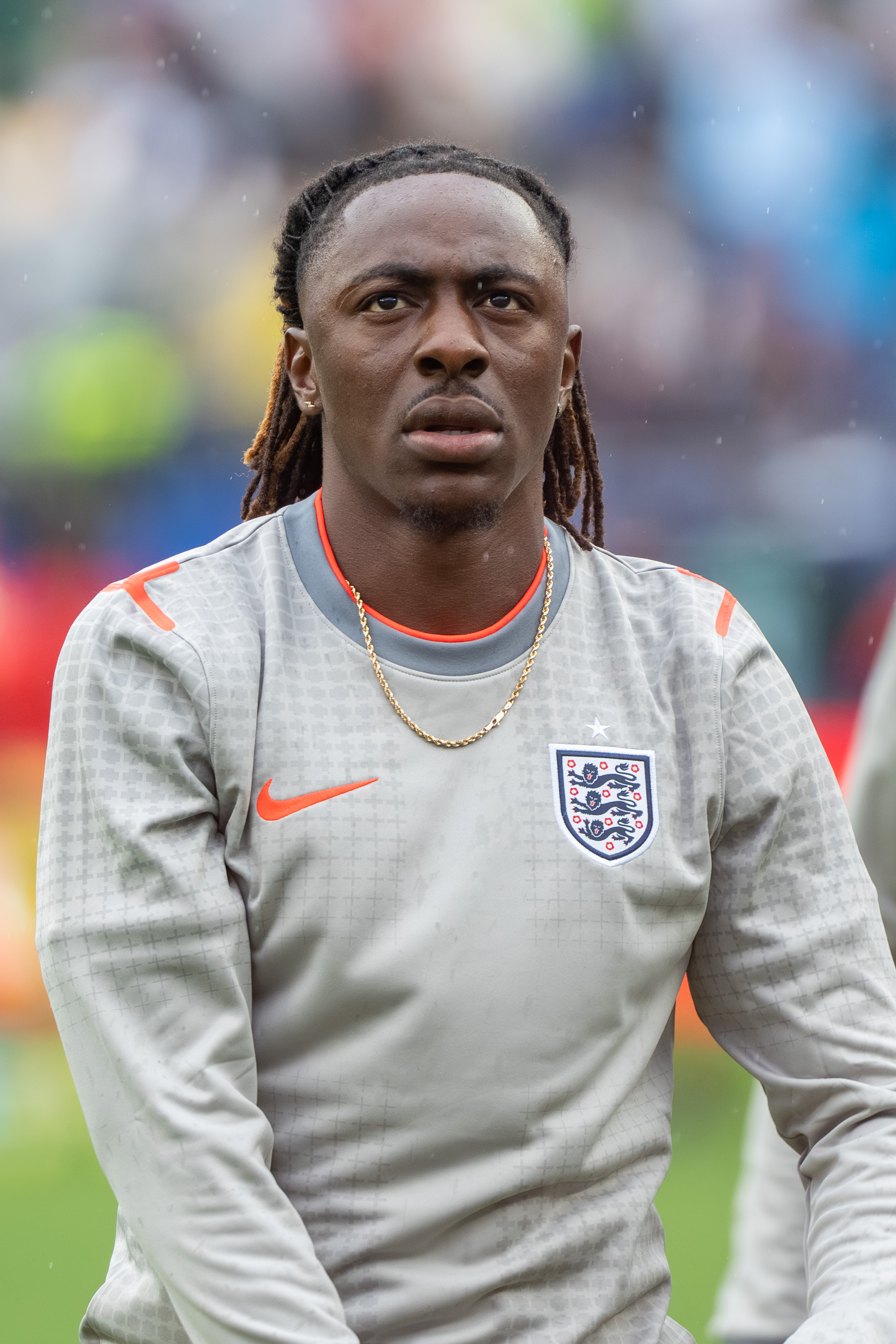
- Eze with England in 2026

Personal information
- Full name: Eberechi Oluchi Eze
- Date of birth: 29 June 1998 (age 28)
- Place of birth: Greenwich, Greater London, England
- Height: 5 ft 10 in (1.78 m)
- Position: Attacking midfielder

Team information
- Current team: Arsenal
- Number: 10

Youth career
- 2006–2011: Arsenal
- 2011–2014: Fulham
- 2014: Reading
- 2014–2016: Millwall

Senior career*
Years	Team	Apps	(Gls)
2016–2020	Queens Park Rangers	104	(20)
2017–2018	→ Wycombe Wanderers (loan)	20	(5)
2020–2025	Crystal Palace	147	(34)
2025–	Arsenal	40	(8)

International career^{‡}
2018–2019	England U20	5	(0)
2019–2021	England U21	8	(1)
2023–	England	25	(3)
Medal record
Men's football
Representing England
FIFA World Cup
Third place	2026 Canada–Mexico–US
UEFA European Championship
Runner-up	2024 Germany
- * Club domestic league appearances and goals as of 19:36, 21 November 2026 (UTC) ‡ National team caps and goals as of 16:10, 7 October 2026 (UTC)

Eberechi Oluchi "Ebere" Eze (/əˈbɛərəˌtʃi ˈɛzə/ ə-BAIR-ə-tchee EZ-ə; born 29 June 1998) is an English professional footballer who plays as an attacking midfielder for Premier League club Arsenal and the England national team.

A product of several English academies, Eze began his senior career in the EFL Championship with Queens Park Rangers in 2016. His breakthrough came in the 2019–20 season, in which he scored 14 goals and was named the club's Player of the Year. He was subsequently signed by Premier League club Crystal Palace, where he went on to make over 150 appearances, and scored the only goal in the 2025 FA Cup final to win the club's first ever major trophy. After winning the 2025 FA Community Shield with Palace, he was signed by boyhood club Arsenal for £67.5 million, winning Premier League title and reaching the 2026 UEFA Champions League final in his first season.

A former England youth international, Eze made his senior debut in 2023, and later helped his country to a runner-up finish at UEFA Euro 2024, and a third-placed finish at the 2026 FIFA World Cup.

== Early life ==
Eberechi Oluchi Eze was born on 29 June 1998 in Greenwich, Greater London. Both his parents are Igbo Nigerians from Mbaise in Imo State. Growing up, he reflected on his life, saying: "There are the nice parts [of Greenwich] and the not so nice parts. I grew up in a not so nice part. It wasn't the easiest life and you don't have as much as other kids around you. The first place we'd go after school is to the cage. We'd stay there till our parents called us in, not eating, playing all day and night. There wasn't really anything else to do. But that's where the love comes from. [At the time], you don't realise it's actually how you're learning your trade." Eze then met Bright Osayi-Samuel, his teammate during his time at Queens Park Rangers, at secondary school, The John Roan School, and played football together at the same district team.

Eze started his football career aged 6 at a little team called All Stars based in and around Plumstead, then Bruin then Arsenal before being released when he was thirteen and then went on to join Fulham and Reading. Eze then appeared as a youth player at Millwall, where he signed a two-year scholarship with the club. Eze quickly progressed through the under-18 and reserve teams. It was announced in April 2016 that Eze would be leaving Millwall at the end of the 2015–16 season after not being offered a professional contract.

== Club career ==
=== Queens Park Rangers ===
==== 2016–2018 ====
Following his release from Millwall, Eze continued studying in college before trialling successfully with Championship club Queens Park Rangers, impressing the club's technical director Chris Ramsey. Eze completed his signing for QPR on 3 August 2016. On 7 January 2017, Eze made his first-team debut in an FA Cup tie against Blackburn Rovers, featuring for 18 minutes before being injured and replaced by Yeni Ngbakoto. The game resulted in a 2–1 home defeat for QPR. This was his only appearance of the 2016–17 season for the side. He then signed a contract extension with the club, keeping him until 2019.

On 30 August 2017, Eze joined League Two club Wycombe Wanderers on loan until January 2018. He made his Wycombe Wanderers debut, coming on as a 79th-minute substitute, in a 0–0 draw against Newport County on 9 September 2017. After making his debut for the club, Eze quickly became a first team regular for the side, where he rotated in different midfield positions. Eze scored his first ever senior goal on 7 October 2017, netting a brace for Wycombe against Cambridge United. His goal against Cambridge United earned him a nomination for the League Two Goal of the Month award for October. He made a total of 20 appearances and played a part in Wycombe gaining promotion that season. Eze scored a further four times in total for Wycombe, putting in some eye-catching performances before returning to QPR in January.

After returning to QPR, Eze featured regularly for Ian Holloway's side, who planned on using him in the first team. His first appearance of the 2017–18 season came on 6 January 2018 against Milton Keynes Dons in the third round of the FA Cup, coming on as a 61st-minute substitute, in a 1–0 loss. By the end of the 2017–18 season, he had made 16 appearances, with his first goal for the club coming on 10 March 2018 against Sunderland, the only goal of the match.

==== 2018–2020 ====
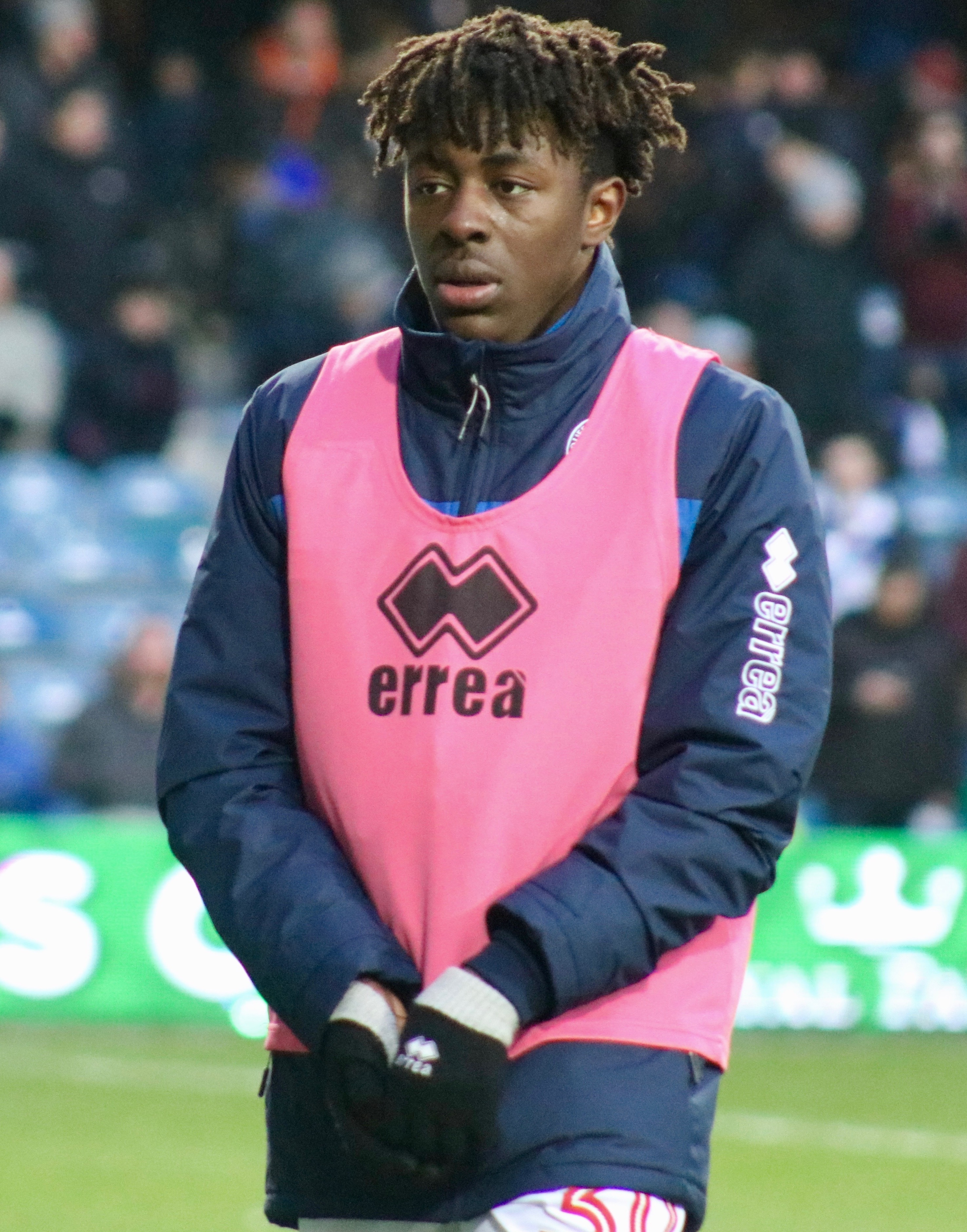
Eze with Queens Park Rangers in 2018

Ahead of the 2018–19 season, Holloway left Queens Park Rangers as the previous season was concluded and his replacement, Steve McClaren handed Eze the number 10 shirt for the club. A week later, he signed a new three-year contract with QPR, binding him to the club until June 2021. Eze started the season well when he scored his first goal of the season, in a 2–1 loss against Sheffield United on 11 August 2018. Eze then scored two consecutive goals between 15 September 2018 and 19 September 2018 against Bolton Wanderers and his former club, Millwall.

Since the start of the 2018–19 season, he continued to be a first team regular for the side, continuing to play in different midfield positions. His performance was praised by McClaren, who said: "Eze has great talent but he did great work off the ball in terms of helping the team defend. We're asking him to do that and it's important that he does that in terms of his development." Eze then set up two goals in two matches between 20 October 2018 and 23 October 2018 against Ipswich Town and Sheffield Wednesday. A month later on 24 November 2018 against Stoke City, he set up two goals for Àngel Rangel, in a 2–2 draw. Eze's fourth goal then came on 1 January 2019, in a 2–2 draw against Aston Villa. However towards the end of the 2018–19 season, Eze soon found himself placed at the substitute bench. He played 46 games in the 2018–19 season, scoring four times in all competitions.

In the opening game of the 2019–20 season, Eze scored his first goal of the season, "sauntered through a static Stoke City defence to double Queens Park Rangers' lead after the interval", to win 2–1. Three weeks later on 24 August 2019, he scored his second goal of the season, as well as setting up the club's third goal of the game, in a 3–1 win against Wigan Athletic. Two weeks later on 11 September 2019, Eze scored his third goal of the season, as well as setting up Queens Park Rangers' third goal of the game, in a 3–2 win against Luton Town. After the match, he was named in the Team of the Week by the English Football League. Since the start of the 2019–20 season, Eze retained his first team place for the side and played in different midfield positions under the new management of Mark Warburton. He then scored four more goals by the end of 2019, including two braces against Hull City and Preston North End. After the match Warburton praised his performance, saying: "Ebe is a tremendous talent. I want him to enjoy his football and he has got to understand how much hard work is required to maximise the talent that he has. He is a talented boy, is playing exceptionally well for us, scoring goals and I hope very much that he is playing with a smile on his face as well."

Eze scored his tenth goal of the season and set up two goals in a 6–1 win against Cardiff City on 1 January 2020. He continued as a first-team regular, and by the time the season was suspended because of the COVID-19 pandemic, he had made 37 league appearances and scored twelve times. Eze remained an integral part of the team once the season resumed behind closed doors. Eze then scored two more goals in the last remaining two matches of the 2019–20 season, coming against Millwall and West Bromwich Albion. He scored 14 goals in 48 games across all competitions in the 2019–20 season, which saw him become one of England's most promising young attacking players. Following this, Eze won the club's Sportito Supporters' Player of the Year. He was also nominated for Championship PFA Bristol Street Motors Fans' Player of the Year for 2019–20 but lost out to Luke Ayling. On 8 September 2020, Eze was named in the PFA Team of the Year for the 2019–20 EFL Championship.

=== Crystal Palace ===
==== 2020–2023: Early seasons, Achilles injury, and resurgence ====
Eze signed for Premier League club Crystal Palace on a five-year contract on 28 August 2020 for a transfer fee reportedly around £17 million. QPR had rejected a £12 million bid from Palace earlier in the month. He was given a number 25 shirt ahead of the new season. On 12 September, he made his Palace debut, coming on as an 81st-minute substitute for Jeffrey Schlupp in a 1–0 win against Southampton in the opening game of the season. Eze scored his first goal for Palace on 7 November from a free kick in a 4–1 home league win over Leeds United.

In May 2021, Eze was reported to have injured his Achilles tendon in a training session and was sidelined for several months. Following the departure of Andros Townsend for Everton at the start of the 2021–22 Premier League season, he was given the number 10 shirt for Palace. He netted his only goal of the season on 30 April, levelling the match on the hour mark with a cushioned left-footed finish in a 2–1 away win against Southampton.

Eze scored his first goal of the 2022–23 season on 9 October 2022, weaving through tackles on the edge of the box before finishing with a low shot, which got Palace a 2–1 win against Leeds United. He scored in his following home match on 18 October, heading in a cross by Michael Olise a minute into the second half, which levelled the game in an eventual 2–1 win against Wolverhampton Wanderers. Eze entered a run of form following the reappointment of manager Roy Hodgson in March 2023, scoring six goals in 10 games (including braces against Southampton and AFC Bournemouth, finishing the season on double figures and as the club's top scorer of the season, having played in every game of Palace's Premier League campaign.

==== 2023–2025: Breakthrough and FA Cup win ====
On 10 November 2023, Eze extended his contract with Crystal Palace until 2027. On 30 December, he scored in a 3–1 win against Brentford, helping end an eight-match winless run, and scored a brace in his next home game, a 3–2 win over Sheffield United on 30 January 2024. He scored the winner in a 1–0 victory over Liverpool on 14 April; the win was Liverpool's first Anfield defeat in 28 games, and was Palace's first away win in 10. In the final game of the season on 19 May, he scored a brace in a 5–0 thrashing of fourth-placed Aston Villa, becoming Crystal Palace's fourth-highest goalscorer in its Premier League history (after Wilfried Zaha, Christian Benteke and Luka Milivojević). Despite injury woes limiting Eze's appearances in the 2023–24 season, he set a new personal record at the club, scoring 11 goals and providing six assists in 31 matches in all competitions. His partnership with Michael Olise and Jean-Philippe Mateta brought about the resurgence of Crystal Palace in the latter stages of the 2023–24 season.

In the opening match of the 2024–25 season against Brentford, Eze seemed to have opened the scoring with a long-range free kick goal later described as "brilliant" and "superb", but it was controversially disallowed as referee Samuel Barrott had already blown his whistle for a perceived foul by Will Hughes; as play had stopped before the ball crossed the line, the video assistant referee was unable to intervene. Brentford scored moments later, and went on to win the game 2–1. The decision was criticised by pundits, with Jamie Redknapp describing it as a "monumental error" and "a nightmare decision... I'm not sure it is a foul, he could have [blown his whistle] after", and Micah Richards classifying it as "not a foul" and "a mistake". Eze revealed in a post-match interview that Barrott had apologised to him for the error, stating that "it could have changed the game, but we have to deal with it." Eze scored his first goal of the season, a right-footed equaliser from outside of the box, in a 1–1 draw versus Chelsea on 1 September.

On 26 April 2025, Eze opened the scoring for Crystal Palace with a long range effort from outside the box in a 3–0 win over Aston Villa in the semi-final of the FA Cup. The result booked Crystal Palace a spot in the 2025 FA Cup final, their third final in club history. This final occurred on 17 May, where Eze scored the winning goal of the game in the 16th minute, when he performed a first-time volley to score from Daniel Muñoz's cross in from the right, leading to Crystal Palace beating Manchester City 1–0, winning Palace's first ever major trophy.

==== 2025: Community Shield win and departure ====
At the start of the 2025–26 season, Eze played every minute of the 2025 FA Community Shield against Liverpool on 10 August 2025; though he missed his penalty in the ensuing penalty shootout, Palace went on to win 3–2 for the club's, and Eze's, second trophy. He was subsequently linked heavily with a move to Tottenham Hotspur, with a deal reportedly close, and was a doubt for selection in Palace's opening game of the Premier League against Chelsea. He ended up playing against Chelsea on 17 August, having a 13th-minute free-kick disallowed by VAR due to a little-applied rule over Marc Guéhi's distance from Chelsea's free-kick wall; the 0–0 draw ended up being Eze's final match for Crystal Palace.

Eze's move to Tottenham reportedly subsequently neared completion, with Palace only holding off on his departure in the hopes of fielding him in the club's maiden European fixture, a UEFA Conference League play-off fixture against Fredrikstad on 21 August, with manager Oliver Glasner stating he "[expected] him to be back playing for us against Fredrikstad". However, on 20 August, it was reported that Tottenham's rivals Arsenal, following an injury to forward Kai Havertz, had hijacked the impending move and reached an agreement with Palace and Eze, with the former Hale End academy player choosing to sign for his boyhood club over Tottenham. Arsenal manager Mikel Arteta later revealed that Eze had made a phone call to him to explore any last-minute chance Arsenal would sign him before he moved to Tottenham, which facilitated his switch.

Eze had been due to play one final match for Palace against Fredrikstad on 21 August, but later pulled out of the squad in the morning following a conversation with Glasner, who confirmed his departure in a post-match interview. On 23 August, Eze released a lengthy farewell statement on social media, calling Crystal Palace a "family club", saying the love and support he received would "live in [his] heart forever", and describing the club's FA Cup triumph as "the most special day of [his] career" that would connect him with fans "for generations".

=== Arsenal ===
On 23 August 2025, Eze completed a move to boyhood club Arsenal for an initial fee of £60 million plus a potential £7.5 million in add-ons, on a four-year deal with the club. The deal was officially announced shortly before Arsenal's first home game of the new season against Leeds United, which Eze was watching from the stands as he was not registered by Arsenal before the deadline of 12pm; his announcement video featured club legend Ian Wright, who had also previously signed for Arsenal from Crystal Palace, also aged 27. He was given the number 10 shirt, which had been left vacant since the departure of Emile Smith Rowe a year prior.

Eze made his debut for Arsenal on 31 August, coming on as a substitute in a 1–0 away defeat to Liverpool. On 24 September, he scored his first goal for the club in a 2–0 away win over Port Vale in the EFL Cup third round. A month later, on 26 October, he scored his first Premier League goal for Arsenal in a 1–0 victory against his former club Crystal Palace. On 23 November, Eze scored his first career hat-trick in a 4–1 home victory over Tottenham Hotspur, becoming the first player in the Premier League era to score a North London derby hat-trick, and the first Arsenal player to do so since Alan Sunderland in 1978. Having not scored a goal in any competition since that match, on 22 February 2026, Eze scored two further goals against Spurs in the 4–1 away win, becoming the first player to score five goals in North London derbies in one season since the 1930s. A month later, on 17 March, he scored his first UEFA Champions League goal in a 2–0 victory over Bayer Leverkusen during the competition's round of 16. On 30 May 2026, he ended his UEFA Champions League campaign with a defeat in the final against the defending champions PSG. During this, he missed a penalty in the shootout.

== International career ==
=== Youth ===
Because Eze is of Nigerian descent, he has trained with the Nigeria national team. On 5 October 2018, he was called up to the England national under-20 team, and made his debut on 11 October 2018 in a 2–1 win against Italy in the 2018–19 Under 20 Elite League. He went on to make six appearances for the under-20 side.

In 2019, Nigeria Football Federation president Amaju Pinnick met with Eze in an attempt to persuade him to switch his allegiance to Nigeria. Eze said that he was undecided on who to represent, but Pinnick stated: "It appears to me that he would want to play for Nigeria, but again, there is a lot of pressure on these players who play in England". Nigeria manager Gernot Rohr later stated in January 2021 that he contacts Eze on a weekly basis.

On 3 September 2019, Eze was called up to the England under-21 squad by manager Aidy Boothroyd for the upcoming 2021 UEFA European Under-21 Championship qualification matches against Turkey and Kosovo. He was an unused substitute on both occasions. Eze eventually made his under-21 debut on 15 November as an 81st-minute substitute for Phil Foden during a 3–0 victory over Albania in 2021 European Under-21 Championship qualification.

In April and November 2020, Eze said he had yet to decide on whether to play for Nigeria or England at senior international level.

Eze was selected for the group stage of the 2021 European Under-21 Championship and scored his only goal at under-21 level in their final game against Croatia.

=== Senior ===
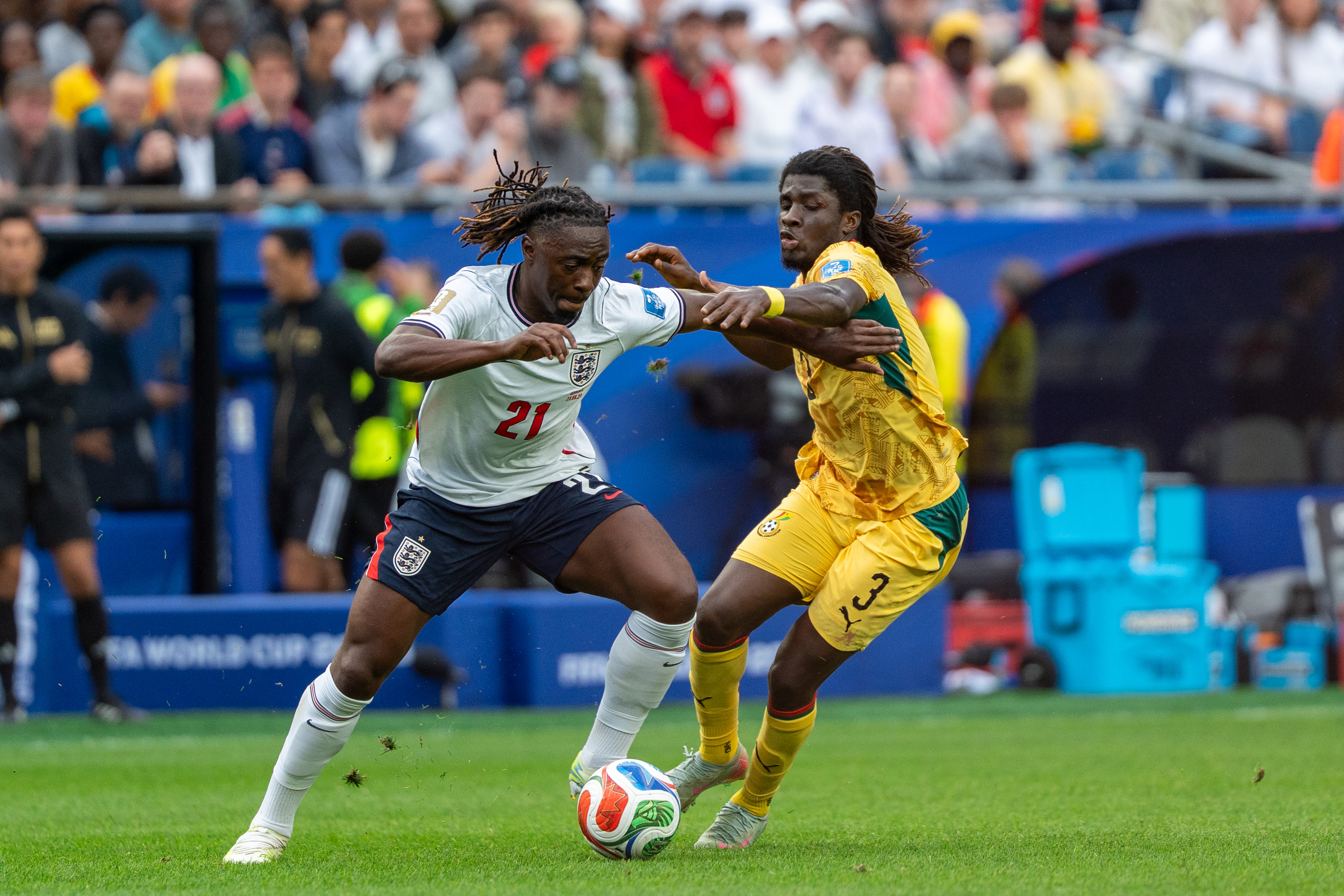
Eze playing for England at the 2026 FIFA World Cup

In May 2021, Eze was called up to the senior England squad for the first time, as part of Gareth Southgate's 33-man provisional squad for UEFA Euro 2020, but on the same day was injured during a training session.

In May 2023, Southgate again called Eze up to the England squad. He made his senior debut on 16 June, appearing as a 70th-minute substitute for James Maddison in a 4–0 UEFA Euro 2024 qualifying win against Malta. This appearance meant he could no longer represent Nigeria after this point.

On 3 June 2024, in a pre-UEFA Euro 2024 friendly against Bosnia and Herzegovina, Eze made his first start for England, playing 63 minutes before being substituted for Jack Grealish. He was named in England's 26-man squad for the tournament on 6 June. On 20 June, he made his European Championship debut, coming on in the 69th minute of England's 1–1 draw against Denmark at Waldstadion in Frankfurt. He appeared as an 84th-minute substitute for Kobbie Mainoo in the round of 16 match against Slovakia on 30 June; in the first minute of extra time, his miscued shot went to Ivan Toney, who headed the ball towards Harry Kane for the winning goal. His third appearance of the tournament came on 6 July, when he came on in the 78th minute of England's quarter-final match against Switzerland, which England won 5–3 on penalties.

On 24 March 2025, Eze scored his first international goal in a 3–0 2026 FIFA World Cup qualifying win over Latvia at Wembley Stadium. This made him the second Crystal Palace player to score for England, after Peter Taylor in 1976.

On 22 May 2026, Eze was selected in the 26-man squad for the 2026 FIFA World Cup.

== Personal life ==
Eze is a Christian, and prayed for the hat-trick he scored in his first North London derby against Tottenham Hotspur. He is a cousin of American comedian Ego Nwodim, a former cast member on Saturday Night Live. He is also a cousin of British comedian Andrew Mensah.

Eze is a keen chess player, having been taught the game by former Crystal Palace teammate Michael Olise; the two were frequently seen on Palace's social media channels playing against each other at the club's training ground. On 3 May 2025, he won PogChamps 6, an online amateur chess tournament organized by Chess.com, defeating gymnast Stephen Nedoroscik and YouTuber Sapnap along the way and earning a prize of $20,000.

== Career statistics ==
=== Club ===
As of match played 21 November 2026

Appearances and goals by club, season and competition
Club	Season	League			FA Cup		EFL Cup		Europe		Other		Total	
Club	Season	Division	Apps	Goals	Apps	Goals	Apps	Goals	Apps	Goals	Apps	Goals	Apps	Goals
Queens Park Rangers	2016–17	Championship	0	0	1	0	0	0	—		—		1	0
Queens Park Rangers	2017–18	Championship	16	2	1	0	0	0	—		—		17	2
Queens Park Rangers	2018–19	Championship	42	4	3	0	1	0	—		—		46	4
Queens Park Rangers	2019–20	Championship	46	14	1	0	1	0	—		—		48	14
Queens Park Rangers	Total		104	20	6	0	2	0	—		—		112	20
Wycombe Wanderers (loan)	2017–18	League Two	20	5	0	0	—		—		2 (Note: Appearances in EFL Trophy)	0	22	5
Crystal Palace	2020–21	Premier League	34	4	1	0	1	0	—		—		36	4
Crystal Palace	2021–22	Premier League	13	1	4	0	0	0	—		—		17	1
Crystal Palace	2022–23	Premier League	38	10	1	0	1	0	—		—		40	10
Crystal Palace	2023–24	Premier League	27	11	2	0	2	0	—		—		31	11
Crystal Palace	2024–25	Premier League	34	8	5	4	4	2	—		—		43	14
Crystal Palace	2025–26	Premier League	1	0	—		—		0	0	1 (Note: Appearance in FA Community Shield)	0	2	0
Crystal Palace	Total		147	34	13	4	8	2	0	0	1	0	169	40
Arsenal	2025–26	Premier League	32	7	3	1	4	1	13 (Note: Appearances in UEFA Champions League)	1	—		52	10
Arsenal	2026–27	Premier League	8	1	0	0	2	0	4	2	1	0	15	3
Arsenal	Total		40	8	3	1	6	1	17	3	1	0	67	13
Career total			310	67	22	5	15	3	16	3	4	0	367	78

=== International ===
As of match played 6 October 2026

Appearances and goals by national team and year
National team	Year	Apps	Goals
England	2023	2	0
England	2024	7	0
England	2025	7	3
England	2026	9	0
Total		25	3

England score listed first, score column indicates score after each Eze goal

List of international goals scored by Eberechi Eze
No.	Date	Venue	Cap	Opponent	Score	Result	Competition	Ref.
1	24 March 2025	Wembley Stadium, London, England	10	Latvia	3–0	3–0	2026 FIFA World Cup qualification	
2	14 October 2025	Daugava Stadium, Riga, Latvia	14	Latvia	5–0	5–0	2026 FIFA World Cup qualification	
3	13 November 2025	Wembley Stadium, London, England	15	Serbia	2–0	2–0	2026 FIFA World Cup qualification	

== Honours ==
Crystal Palace

- FA Cup: 2024–25
- FA Community Shield: 2025

Arsenal

- Premier League: 2025–26
- FA Community Shield: 2026
- UEFA Champions League runner-up: 2025–26

England

- UEFA European Championship runner-up: 2024
- FIFA World Cup third place: 2026

Individual

- PFA Team of the Year: 2019–20 Championship
- Queens Park Rangers Player of the Year: 2019–20
- Queens Park Rangers Players' Player of the Year: 2019–20
