= Macclesfield 2–1 Crystal Palace (2026) =

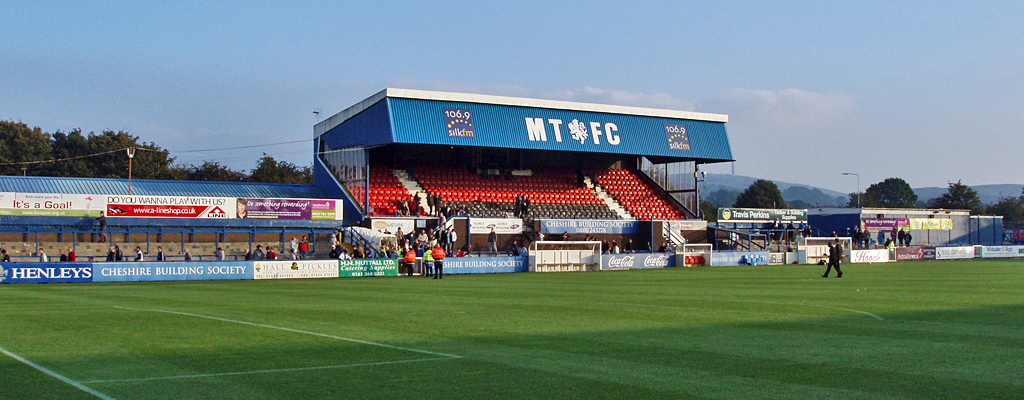
- Event: 2025–26 FA Cup
Macclesfield	Crystal Palace
2	1
- Date: 10 January 2026
- Venue: Moss Rose, Macclesfield
- Referee: Tim Robinson
- Attendance: 5,348

Macclesfield vs Crystal Palace was an FA Cup third round match played on 10 January 2026 at Moss Rose, Macclesfield between National League North side Macclesfield and Premier League side Crystal Palace. In a match widely regarded as the biggest upset in the history of the competition as well as one of the biggest upsets in the history of football, Macclesfield defeated reigning FA Cup holders Crystal Palace 2–1.

This was the first time since the formation of the Premier League that a level 6 side had defeated a side from the top division. This also made Crystal Palace the first defending champions to lose against a non-League team since Wolverhampton Wanderers lost against Crystal Palace themselves in 1909. It was also the biggest upset in terms of league placings (117 places between the two sides) in FA Cup history, a record previously held by Chasetown vs Port Vale in a 2007–08 FA Cup 2nd round replay (108 places).

The match was Crystal Palace captain Marc Guéhi's final game for the club.

== Route to the match ==
=== Macclesfield ===
Round	Opposition	Score
QR2	Atherton Laburnum Rovers (H) (Div. 9)	3–0
QR3	Nantwich Town (H) (Div. 8)	2–0
QR4	Stamford (H) (Div. 7)	1–0
1st	AFC Totton (H) (Div. 6)	6–3
2nd	Slough Town (A) (Div. 6)	1–3 (a.e.t.)
Key: (H) = Home venue; (A) = Away venue.

As a National League North team, Macclesfield started in the second qualifying round, where they were drawn with North West Counties League side Atherton Laburnum Rovers at home. They won the match 3–0 due to goals from Sean Etaluku, Ethan McLeod and D'Mani Mellor. In the third qualifying round, they were drawn with Northern Premier League Division One West side Nantwich Town at home, where they won the match 2–0 due to goals from Josh Kay and Danny Elliott. In the fourth qualifying round, they were drawn with Southern League Premier Division Central side Stamford at home. They won the match 1–0 due to a goal from Paul Dawson, sending the phoenix club to the FA Cup for the first time in history.

In the first round proper, they were drawn with National League South side A.F.C. Totton at home. They won the match 6–3 with goals from Paul Dawson, Rollin Menayese, Lewis Fensome and a hat-trick from Elliott. In the second round proper, they were drawn with National League South side Slough Town away. After goals from Elliott, James Edmondson and Regan Griffiths, they won the match 3–1 after extra time to set up the game with Crystal Palace.

On 17 December, between the second and third rounds, striker Ethan McLeod died in a car accident on the way home from the league match against Bedford Town.

=== Crystal Palace ===
As a Premier League team, Crystal Palace were automatically given a bye to the third round of the FA Cup.

== Match summary ==
10 January 2026
12:15 GMT

Macclesfield	2–1	Crystal Palace
Dawson 43'; Buckley-Ricketts 60'	Report	Pino 90'

Moss Rose, Macclesfield
Attendance: 5,348
Referee: Tim Robinson (West Sussex)

Macclesfield	Crystal Palace

GK	1	(England) Max Dearnley
LB	15	(England) Luis Lacey		(substituted off) 79'
CB	12	(England) Sam Heathcote	(yellow card) 79'
CB	5	(Wales) Rollin Menayese
RB	4	(England) Lewis Fensome
DM	28	(England) James Edmondson
LM	7	(England) Isaac Buckley-Ricketts
CM	6	(England) Paul Dawson (c)
CM	21	(England) Josh Kay	(yellow card) 45+2'	(substituted off) 80'
RM	11	(England) Luke Duffy		(substituted off) 79'
ST	9	(England) D'Mani Mellor		(substituted off) 90+5'
Substitutes:
GK	31	(England) Shea Callister
DF	2	(England) Luke Matheson		(substituted on) 79'
DF	35	(England) Cameron Borthwick-Jackson		(substituted on) 79'
MF	8	(England) Regan Griffiths
MF	17	(England) Carlos Dos Santos		(substituted on) 80'
MF	23	(England) Danny Whitehead		(substituted on) 90+5'
MF	33	(England) Cameron Bradbury-Allen
FW	34	(England) Mikey Stone
Coach:
(England) John Rooney

GK	44	(Argentina) Walter Benítez
CB	23	(France) Jaydee Canvot		(substituted off) 46'
CB	6	(England) Marc Guéhi (c)	(yellow card) 76'
CB	26	(United States) Chris Richards
LM	24	(Croatia) Borna Sosa	(yellow card) 62'
CM	42	(England) Kaden Rodney		(substituted off) 46'
CM	20	(England) Adam Wharton
RM	55	(Northern Ireland) Justin Devenny		(substituted off) 69'
AM	10	(Spain) Yéremy Pino
AM	86	(England) Joél Drakes-Thomas		(substituted off) 46'
ST	12	(Nigeria) Christantus Uche
Substitutes:
GK	1	(England) Dean Henderson
DF	3	(England) Tyrick Mitchell		(substituted on) 46'
DF	5	(France) Maxence Lacroix
DF	60	(Republic of Ireland) George King
DF	72	(England) Dean Benamar
MF	11	(Wales) Brennan Johnson		(substituted on) 46'
MF	19	(England) Will Hughes		(substituted on) 46'
FW	63	(England) Zach Marsh
FW	73	(England) Benjamin Casey		(substituted on) 69'
Coach:
(Austria) Oliver Glasner

== Match statistics ==
	Macclesfield	Crystal Palace
Goals scored	2	1
Total shots	13	12
Shots on target	4	4
Ball possession	28%	72%
Corner kicks	2	3
Fouls committed	8	13
Yellow cards	2	2
Red cards	0	0
