= 2025–26 Crystal Palace F.C. season =

English football club season

Crystal Palace
2025–26 season
- Co-owners: Woody Johnson (45%); Josh Harris (10%); David Blitzer (10%); Steve Parish (10%)
- Chairman: Steve Parish
- Manager: Oliver Glasner
- Stadium: Selhurst Park
- Premier League: 15th
- FA Cup: Third round
- EFL Cup: Quarter-finals
- FA Community Shield: Winners
- UEFA Conference League: Winners
- Top goalscorer: League: Jean-Philippe Mateta (12); All: Ismaïla Sarr (21)
- Highest home attendance: 25,192 (v. Arsenal, Premier League, 24 May 2026)
- Lowest home attendance: 21,306 (v. KuPS, UEFA Conference League, 18 December 2025)
- Average home league attendance: 24,925
- Biggest win: 3–0 v. Aston Villa (A); Premier League, 31 August 2025; 3–0 v. Liverpool (A); EFL Cup, 29 October 2025; 3–0 v. Shelbourne (A); UEFA Conference League, 11 December 2025; 3–0 v. Fiorentina (H); UEFA Conference League, 9 April 2026
- Biggest defeat: 0–3 v. Manchester City (H); Premier League, 14 December 2025; 1–4 v. Leeds United (A); Premier League, 20 December 2025; 0–3 v. Bournemouth (A); Premier League, 3 May 2026; 0–3 v. Manchester City (A); Premier League, 13 May 2026
Home colours	Away colours	Third colours

The 2025–26 season was the 120th season in the history of Crystal Palace Football Club, and their thirteenth consecutive season in the Premier League. In addition to the domestic league, the club also participated in the FA Cup, the EFL Cup, the FA Community Shield, and the UEFA Conference League, with the latter two being the club's debut appearance in the respective tournaments. They won both the FA Community Shield and the UEFA Conference League and finished 15th in the Premier League. Manager Oliver Glasner left the club at the end of the season.

This was the first season since 2011–12 not to feature former club captain Joel Ward, who departed Palace after thirteen years following the expiration of his contract. He was the last remaining player from the side of 2012–13 that achieved promotion to the Premier League from the EFL Championship, and left Nathaniel Clyne as the last remaining player to have represented the club in the second division.

== Season summary ==
Palace began their season on 10 August 2025 against Liverpool at Wembley in the FA Community Shield. After a 2–2 draw, Palace won in a penalty shoot-out with goalkeeper Dean Henderson making two saves. Palace would beat Liverpool again the following month, with a 2–1 win in the league.

On 21 August, Jean-Philippe Mateta netted Palace's first goal in European competitions, securing a 1–0 win over Fredrikstad in the UEFA Conference League play-off round. Summer trading in the transfer market saw England international Eberechi Eze leave for Arsenal for a fee of £60 million (possibly rising to £67 million), a record amount received by Crystal Palace. Incomings included Spanish international Yéremy Pino and French under-21 defender Jaydee Canvot. A late transfer move by Liverpool F.C. for club captain Marc Guéhi was cancelled after a deal had been agreed.

The team made a good start to the Premier League, sitting in 4th place in the table after 15 games of the season in early December. They then embarked on a winless run of 9 games, slipping to 15th place at the end of January 2026. The poor form extended to the cup competitions, with the club losing an EFL Cup quarter-final to Arsenal in December, and a shock defeat to non-league Macclesfield in the FA Cup.

The January transfer window saw Guéhi leave for Manchester City and forwards Brennan Johnson, Jørgen Strand Larsen (for a club record fee of £43 million) and Evann Guessand (on loan) arrive.

Palace finished 15th at the end of the Premier League season, earning a spot in the competition for the 14th consecutive season. Following a defeat to Arsenal on the final matchday, Palace played in the final of the UEFA Conference League. After winning 1–0 against Rayo Vallecano thanks to a Jean-Philippe Mateta goal, Palace secured qualification to the UEFA Europa League league phase. They also secured their first ever trophy double in club history.

== Squad ==
As of 23 February 2026

Note: Flags indicate national team as defined under FIFA eligibility rules; some limited exceptions apply. Players may hold more than one non-FIFA nationality.

No.	Pos.	Nation	Player
1	GK	ENG	Dean Henderson (captain)
2	DF	COL	Daniel Muñoz
3	DF	ENG	Tyrick Mitchell
5	DF	FRA	Maxence Lacroix (3rd captain)
7	FW	SEN	Ismaïla Sarr
8	MF	COL	Jefferson Lerma
9	FW	ENG	Eddie Nketiah
10	MF	ESP	Yéremy Pino
11	FW	WAL	Brennan Johnson
12	FW	NGR	Christantus Uche (on loan from Getafe)
14	FW	FRA	Jean-Philippe Mateta
17	DF	ENG	Nathaniel Clyne
18	MF	JPN	Daichi Kamada
19	MF	ENG	Will Hughes (vice-captain)

No.	Pos.	Nation	Player
20	MF	ENG	Adam Wharton
22	FW	NOR	Jørgen Strand Larsen
23	DF	FRA	Jaydee Canvot
24	DF	CRO	Borna Sosa
26	DF	USA	Chris Richards
28	MF	MLI	Cheick Doucouré
29	FW	CIV	Evann Guessand (on loan from Aston Villa)
31	GK	ENG	Remi Matthews
34	DF	MAR	Chadi Riad
38	DF	ENG	Caleb Kporha
42	MF	ENG	Kaden Rodney
44	GK	ARG	Walter Benítez
55	MF	NIR	Justin Devenny
59	DF	TTO	Rio Cardines

== Transfers ==
=== In ===
Date	Pos.	Player	From	Fee	Ref.
1 July 2025	GK	(Argentina) Walter Benítez	(Netherlands) PSV Eindhoven	Free transfer	
11 July 2025	LB	(Croatia) Borna Sosa	(Netherlands) Ajax	£3,000,000	
23 July 2025	LB	(England) Khyan Frazer-Williams	(England) AFC Dunstable	Free transfer	
15 August 2025	GK	(England) Harry Lee	(England) Exeter City	Free transfer	
29 August 2025	RW	(Spain) Yéremy Pino	(Spain) Villarreal	£26,000,000	
1 September 2025	CB	(France) Jaydee Canvot	(France) Toulouse	£17,500,000	
2 January 2026	RW	(Wales) Brennan Johnson	(England) Tottenham Hotspur	£35,000,000	
1 February 2026	FW	(Norway) Jørgen Strand Larsen	(England) Wolverhampton Wanderers	£43,000,000 (Note: plus potential £5,000,000 in add-ons)	

Expenditure: ▼ ~ £124,500,000

=== Out ===
Date	Pos.	Player	To	Fee	Ref.
24 June 2025	CB	(Republic of Ireland) Seán Grehan	(England) Doncaster Rovers	£150,000	
23 July 2025	CF	(England) Ademola Ola-Adebomi	(Austria) WSG Tirol	Free transfer	
5 August 2025	RW	(England) Malcolm Ebiowei	(England) Blackpool	£1,000,000	
23 August 2025	LW	(England) Eberechi Eze	(England) Arsenal	£60,000,000 (Note: plus £7,500,000 in add-ons)	
1 September 2025	CF	(France) Odsonne Édouard	(France) Lens	£4,000,000	
7 January 2026	CM	(France) Naouirou Ahamada	(France) Auxerre	Free transfer	
19 January 2026	CB	(England) Marc Guéhi	(England) Manchester City	£20,000,000	

Income: ▲ ~ £85,150,000

=== Loans in ===
Date	Pos.	Player	From	Date until	Ref.
1 September 2025	CF	(Nigeria) Christantus Uche	(Spain) Getafe	31 May 2026	
30 January 2026	RW	(Ivory Coast) Evann Guessand	(England) Aston Villa	31 May 2026 (Note: Club option to sign permanently)	

=== Loans out ===
Date	Pos.	Player	To	Date until	Ref.
2 July 2025	GK	(England) Owen Goodman	(England) Huddersfield Town	15 January 2026 (Note: On 15 January, Goodman was recalled from his season-long loan at Huddersfield Town and subsequently joined Barnsley on loan)	
10 July 2025	GK	(England) Joe Whitworth	(England) Exeter City	31 May 2026	
15 July 2025	RB	(England) Danny Imray	(England) Blackpool	16 January 2026 (Note: On 16 January, Imray was recalled from a season-long loan at Blackpool)	
26 July 2025	LB	(Republic of Ireland) Tayo Adaramola	(England) Leyton Orient	1 February 2026 (Note: On 1 February, Adaramola was recalled from his initial season-long loan at Leyton Orient and subsequently joined Sheffield Wednesday on loan)	
22 August 2025	CF	(England) Jemiah Umolu	(England) Bromley	31 May 2026	
26 August 2025	CAM	(Brazil) Matheus França	(Brazil) Vasco da Gama	30 June 2026	
26 August 2025	CAM	(Sierra Leone) Hindolo Mustapha	(Germany) 1. FC Nürnberg	1 January 2026 (Note: On 16 December, it was announced Mustapha would return from his loan at Nürnberg in January)	
12 September 2025	RW	(England) Jesurun Rak-Sakyi	(Turkey) Çaykur Rizespor	2 February 2026 (Note: On 2 February, Rak-Sayki was recalled from his initial season-long loan at Çaykur Rizespor and subsequently joined Stoke City on loan)	
7 January 2026	RW	(England) Romain Esse	(England) Coventry City	31 May 2026	
15 January 2026	GK	(England) Owen Goodman	(England) Barnsley	31 May 2026	
30 January 2026	RB	(England) Danny Imray	(England) West Bromwich Albion	31 May 2026	
1 February 2026	LB	(Republic of Ireland) Tayo Adaramola	(England) Sheffield Wednesday	31 May 2026	
2 February 2026	RW	(England) Jesurun Rak-Sakyi	(England) Stoke City	31 May 2026	

=== Released / out of contract ===
Date	Pos.	Player	Subsequent club	Ref.
30 June 2025	GK	(England) Louie Moulden	(England) Norwich City	
30 June 2025	CM	(Republic of Ireland) Killian Phillips	(Scotland) St Mirren	
30 June 2025	RB	(England) Joel Ward	(Wales) Swansea City	
30 June 2025	LM	(Ghana) Jeffrey Schlupp	(England) Norwich City	
30 June 2025	CF	(England) Luke Plange	(Switzerland) Grasshopper	
30 June 2025	CM	(England) Jack Wells-Morrison	(Scotland) Ross County	
30 June 2025	CB	(England) Joe Sheridan		
30 June 2025	RW	(England) Roshaun Mathurin		
30 June 2025	DM	(Northern Ireland) Cormac Austin		
30 June 2025	RB	(England) Finley Marjoram		
30 June 2025	LB	(England) Freddie Cowin		
30 June 2025	CF	(England) Chimaechi Eze		
30 June 2025	CB	(England) Chris Francis		
30 June 2025	GK	(England) Joseph Khoshaba		
30 June 2025	RW	(Portugal) Enrique Lameiras		
30 June 2025	LB	(Zimbabwe) Kurai Musanhi	(England) Colchester United	
30 June 2025	AM	(Wales) Jadan Raymond	(England) Dulwich Hamlet	
30 June 2025	CF	(Grenada) Caleb Redhead	(England) Millwall	
31 July 2025	CB	(England) Rob Holding	(United States) Colorado Rapids	

== Pre-season and friendlies ==
On 4 July, a behind closed doors match against Millwall was confirmed, followed by a trip to face Crawley Town was confirmed. A training camp in Austria was added with friendlies against Mainz 05 and FC Augsburg.

Win Draw Loss Fixtures

12 July 2025 Friendly	Crystal Palace	1–0	Millwall	Beckenham
12:00 BST	Rak-Sakyi 50'	Report		Stadium: Crystal Palace Training Ground; Attendance: 0 (behind closed doors)

25 July 2025 Friendly	Crawley Town	0–3	Crystal Palace	Crawley
19:30 BST		Report	Mateta 2'; Eze 28'; Muñoz 70'	Stadium: Broadfield Stadium

29 July 2025 Friendly	Mainz 05	1–1	Crystal Palace	Wals-Siezenheim, Austria
14:00 CEST	Weiper 55'	Report	Mateta 38'	Stadium: Hans-Ludwig-Stadion
Note: 60-minute match, first leg of double-header

29 July 2025 Friendly	Mainz 05	3–2	Crystal Palace	Wals-Siezenheim, Austria
15:20 CEST	Sieb 4'; Bobzien 13'; Schopp 36'	Report	Esse 48'; Lacroix 56'	Stadium: Hans-Ludwig-Stadion
Note: 60-minute match, second leg of double-header

1 August 2025 Friendly	FC Augsburg	1–3	Crystal Palace	Bad Wimsbach-Neydharting, Austria
16:00 CEST	Jakić (yellow card) 38'; Tietz 90+2'	Report	Mateta 39', 51', (yellow card) 63'; Eze 67'	Stadium: Hofmaninger Stadium
Note: First leg of double-header

1 August 2025 Friendly	FC Augsburg	1–0	Crystal Palace	Bad Wimsbach-Neydharting, Austria
18:00 CEST	Dardari 82'	Report		Stadium: Hofmaninger Stadium
Note: Second leg of double-header

== Competitions ==
=== Overall record ===
Competition	First match	Last match	Starting round	Final position	Record							
Competition	First match	Last match	Starting round	Final position	Pld	W	D	L	GF	GA	GD	Win %
Premier League	17 August 2025	24 May 2026	Matchday 1	15th	38	11	12	15	41	50	−9	28.95
FA Cup	10 January 2026		Third round	Third round	1	0	0	1	1	2	−1	0.00
EFL Cup	16 September 2025	23 December 2025	Third round	Quarter-finals	3	1	2	0	5	2	+3	33.33
FA Community Shield	10 August 2025		Final	Winners	1	0	1	0	2	2	+0	0.00
UEFA Conference League	21 August 2025	27 May 2026	Play-off round	Winners	17	10	4	3	27	12	+15	58.82
Total					60	22	19	19	76	68	+8	36.67

Source: Soccerway

=== Premier League ===
==== League table ====
Pos	Team	Pld	W	D	L	GF	GA	GD	Pts	Qualification or relegation
13	Everton	38	13	10	15	47	50	−3	49	
14	Leeds United	38	11	14	13	49	56	−7	47	
15	Crystal Palace	38	11	12	15	41	51	−10	45	Qualification for the Europa League league phase (Note: Crystal Palace qualified for the Europa League league phase as the 2025–26 UEFA Conference League winners.)
16	Nottingham Forest	38	11	11	16	48	51	−3	44	
17	Tottenham Hotspur	38	10	11	17	48	57	−9	41	

Source: Premier League
Rules for classification: 1) Points; 2) Goal difference; 3) Goals scored; 4) If the champions, relegated teams or qualified teams for UEFA competitions cannot be determined by rules 1 to 3, rules 4.1 to 4.3 are applied – 4.1) Points gained in head-to-head record between such teams; 4.2) Away goals scored in head-to-head record between such teams; 4.3) Play-offs

==== Results summary ====
Overall								Home						Away					
Pld	W	D	L	GF	GA	GD	Pts	W	D	L	GF	GA	GD	W	D	L	GF	GA	GD
38	11	12	15	41	51	−10	45	4	9	6	19	23	−4	7	3	9	22	28	−6

Source: Soccerway

==== Results by round ====
Round	1	2	3	4	5	6	7	8	9	10	11	12	13	14	15	16	17	18	19	20	21	22	23	24	25	26	27	28	29	30	32	33	34	35	36	31^{1}	37	38
Ground	A	H	A	H	A	H	A	H	A	H	H	A	H	A	A	H	A	H	H	A	H	A	H	A	A	H	H	A	A	H	H	H	A	A	H	A	A	H
Result	D	D	W	D	W	W	L	D	L	W	D	W	L	W	W	L	L	L	D	L	D	L	L	D	W	L	W	L	W	D	W	D	L	L	D	L	D	L
Position	12	14	8	9	5	3	6	8	10	9	10	5	9	5	4	5	8	9	10	14	13	13	15	15	13	13	13	14	13	14	13	13	13	15	15	15	15	15
Points	1	2	5	6	9	12	12	13	13	16	17	20	20	23	26	26	26	26	27	27	28	28	28	29	32	32	35	35	38	39	42	43	43	43	44	44	45	45

Source: Premier League
A = Away; H = Home; W = Win; D = Draw; L = Loss; P = Postponed

^{1} Matchday 31 (vs Manchester City) was postponed due to Manchester City's participation in the EFL Cup final.

==== Matches ====
The league fixtures were released on 18 June 2025.

Win Draw Loss Fixtures

17 August 2025 1	Chelsea	0–0	Crystal Palace	Fulham
14:00 BST		Report		Stadium: Stamford Bridge; Attendance: 39,678; Referee: Darren England

24 August 2025 2	Crystal Palace	1–1	Nottingham Forest	Selhurst
14:00 BST	Sarr 37'	Report	Hudson-Odoi 57'	Stadium: Selhurst Park; Attendance: 24,876; Referee: Anthony Taylor
Note: Fixture was originally scheduled for 23 August, but was moved for live broadcasting.

31 August 2025 3	Aston Villa	0–3	Crystal Palace	Birmingham
19:00 BST		Report	Mateta 21' (pen.); Guéhi 68'; Sarr 78'	Stadium: Villa Park; Attendance: 41,036; Referee: Stuart Attwell
Note: Fixture was originally scheduled for 30 August, but was moved to 29 August for live broadcasting. It was later moved again due to Palace's participation in the UEFA Conference League on the preceding Thursday.

13 September 2025 4	Crystal Palace	0–0	Sunderland	Selhurst
15:00 BST		Report		Stadium: Selhurst Park; Attendance: 25,154; Referee: Thomas Bramall

20 September 2025 5	West Ham United	1–2	Crystal Palace	Stratford
15:00 BST	Bowen 49'	Report	Mateta 37'; Mitchell 68'	Stadium: London Stadium; Attendance: 62,455; Referee: Tony Harrington

27 September 2025 6	Crystal Palace	2–1	Liverpool	Selhurst
15:00 BST	Sarr 9'; Nketiah 90+7'	Report	Chiesa 87'	Stadium: Selhurst Park; Attendance: 25,118; Referee: Chris Kavanagh

5 October 2025 7	Everton	2–1	Crystal Palace	Liverpool
14:00 BST	Ndiaye 76' (pen.); Grealish 90+3'	Report	Muñoz 37'	Stadium: Hill Dickinson Stadium; Attendance: 51,770; Referee: Michael Salisbury
Note: Fixture was initially scheduled for 4 October, but was rescheduled due to Palace's participation in the UEFA Conference League on the preceding Thursday.

18 October 2025 8	Crystal Palace	3–3	Bournemouth	Selhurst
15:00 BST	Mateta 64', 69', 90+7' (pen.)	Report	Kroupi 7', 38'; Christie 89'	Stadium: Selhurst Park; Attendance: 25,125; Referee: Jarred Gillett

26 October 2025 9	Arsenal	1–0	Crystal Palace	Holloway
14:00 GMT	Eze 39'	Report		Stadium: Emirates Stadium; Attendance: 60,103; Referee: Thomas Bramall
Note: Fixture was initially scheduled for 25 October, but was rescheduled due to Palace's participation in the UEFA Conference League on the preceding Thursday.

1 November 2025 10	Crystal Palace	2–0	Brentford	Selhurst
15:00 GMT	Mateta 30'; Collins 51' (o.g.)	Report		Stadium: Selhurst Park; Attendance: 25,083; Referee: Peter Bankes

9 November 2025 11	Crystal Palace	0–0	Brighton & Hove Albion	Selhurst
14:00 GMT		Report		Stadium: Selhurst Park; Attendance: 24,326; Referee: Tim Robinson
Note: Fixture was initially scheduled for 8 November, but was rescheduled due to Palace's participation in the UEFA Conference League on the preceding Thursday.

22 November 2025 12	Wolverhampton Wanderers	0–2	Crystal Palace	Wolverhampton
15:00 GMT		Report	Muñoz 63'; Pino 69'	Stadium: Molineux Stadium; Attendance: 29,976; Referee: Anthony Taylor

30 November 2025 13	Crystal Palace	1–2	Manchester United	Selhurst
12:00 GMT	Mateta 36' (pen.)	Report	Zirkzee 54'; Mount 63'	Stadium: Selhurst Park; Attendance: 25,189; Referee: Robert Jones
Note: Fixture was initially scheduled for 29 November, but was rescheduled for live broadcasting.

3 December 2025 14	Burnley	0–1	Crystal Palace	Burnley
19:30 GMT		Report	Muñoz 44'	Stadium: Turf Moor; Attendance: 19,365; Referee: Thomas Kirk
Note: Fixture was initially scheduled for a 19:45 kick-off, but was rescheduled for live broadcasting.

7 December 2025 15	Fulham	1–2	Crystal Palace	Fulham
16:30 GMT	Wilson 38'	Report	Nketiah 20'; Guéhi 87'	Stadium: Craven Cottage; Attendance: 27,283; Referee: Sam Barrott
Note: Fixture was initially scheduled for 6 December, but was rescheduled for live broadcasting.

14 December 2025 16	Crystal Palace	0–3	Manchester City	Selhurst
14:00 GMT		Report	Haaland 41', 89' (pen.); Foden 69'	Stadium: Selhurst Park; Attendance: 25,166; Referee: Darren England
Note: Fixture was initially scheduled for 13 December, but was rescheduled for live broadcasting.

20 December 2025 17	Leeds United	4–1	Crystal Palace	Leeds
20:00 GMT	Calvert-Lewin 38', 45+4'; Ampadu 60'; Stach 90+11'	Report	Devenny 90+2' (pen.)	Stadium: Elland Road; Attendance: 36,334; Referee: Thomas Bramall
Note: Fixture was initially scheduled for 20 December at 15:00, but was rescheduled to 21 December for live broadcasting, before being shifted back to 20 December due to Crystal Palace's involvement in the EFL Cup quarter-finals.

28 December 2025 18	Crystal Palace	0–1	Tottenham Hotspur	Selhurst
16:30 GMT		Report	Gray 42'	Stadium: Selhurst Park; Attendance: 25,186; Referee: Jarred Gillett
Note: Fixture was initially scheduled for 27 December, but was rescheduled for live broadcasting.

1 January 2026 19	Crystal Palace	1–1	Fulham	Selhurst
17:30 GMT	Mateta 39'	Report	Cairney 80'	Stadium: Selhurst Park; Attendance: 25,111; Referee: Tony Harrington
Note: Fixture was initially scheduled for 30 December, but was rescheduled for live broadcasting.

4 January 2026 20	Newcastle United	2–0	Crystal Palace	Newcastle upon Tyne
15:00 GMT	Bruno Guimarães 71'; Thiaw 78'	Report		Stadium: St James' Park; Attendance: 51,979; Referee: John Brooks
Note: Fixture was initially scheduled for 3 January, but was rescheduled for live broadcasting.

7 January 2026 21	Crystal Palace	0–0	Aston Villa	Selhurst
19:30 GMT		Report		Stadium: Selhurst Park; Attendance: 24,841; Referee: Andrew Madley
Note: Fixture was initially scheduled for a 20:00 kick-off, but was rescheduled for live broadcasting.

17 January 2026 22	Sunderland	2–1	Crystal Palace	Sunderland
15:00 GMT	Le Fée 33'; Brobbey 71'	Report	Pino 30'	Stadium: Stadium of Light; Attendance: 47,257; Referee: Robert Jones

25 January 2026 23	Crystal Palace	1–3	Chelsea	Selhurst
14:00 GMT	Wharton (yellow card) 67' (yellow-red card) 72'; Richards 88'	Report	Estêvão 34'; João Pedro 50'; Fernández 64' (pen.)	Stadium: Selhurst Park; Attendance: 25,163; Referee: Darren England
Note: Fixture was initially scheduled for 24 January, but was rescheduled for live broadcasting.

1 February 2026 24	Nottingham Forest	1–1	Crystal Palace	West Bridgford
14:00 GMT	Gibbs-White 5'; Williams (red card) 45'	Report	Sarr 45+2' (pen.)	Stadium: City Ground; Attendance: 30,334; Referee: Tony Harrington
Note: Fixture was initially scheduled for 31 January, but was rescheduled for live broadcasting.

8 February 2026 25	Brighton & Hove Albion	0–1	Crystal Palace	Brighton and Hove
14:00 GMT		Report	Sarr 61'	Stadium: Falmer Stadium; Attendance: 31,179; Referee: Thomas Bramall
Note: Fixture was initially scheduled for 31 January, but was rescheduled for live broadcasting.

11 February 2026 26	Crystal Palace	2–3	Burnley	Selhurst
19:30 GMT	Larsen 17', 33'	Report	Mejbri 40'; Anthony 44'; Lerma 45+2' (o.g.)	Stadium: Selhurst Park; Attendance: 23,267; Referee: Farai Hallam
Note: Fixture was initially scheduled for a 20:00 kick-off, but was rescheduled for live broadcasting.

22 February 2026 27	Crystal Palace	1–0	Wolverhampton Wanderers	Selhurst
14:00 GMT	Guessand 90'	Report	Krejčí (yellow card) 58' (yellow-red card) 61'	Stadium: Selhurst Park; Attendance: 24,547; Referee: Thomas Kirk
Note: Fixture was initially scheduled for 21 February, but was rearranged due to Palace's participation in the UEFA Conference League on the preceding Thursday.

1 March 2026 28	Manchester United	2–1	Crystal Palace	Trafford
14:00 GMT	Fernandes 57' (pen.); Šeško 65'	Report	Lacroix 4', (red card) 56'	Stadium: Old Trafford; Attendance: 73,934; Referee: Chris Kavanagh
Note: Fixture was initially scheduled for 28 February, but was rearranged due to Palace's participation in the UEFA Conference League on the preceding Thursday.

5 March 2026 29	Tottenham Hotspur	1–3	Crystal Palace	Tottenham
20:00 GMT	Solanke 34'; Van de Ven (red card) 38'	Report	Sarr 40' (pen.), 45+7'; Larsen 45+1'	Stadium: Tottenham Hotspur Stadium; Attendance: 60,213; Referee: Andrew Madley
Note: Fixture was initially scheduled for 4 March, but was rescheduled for live broadcasting.

15 March 2026 30	Crystal Palace	0–0	Leeds United	Selhurst
14:00 GMT		Report	Gudmundsson (yellow card) 26' (yellow-red card) 45+5'	Stadium: Selhurst Park; Attendance: 25,155; Referee: Thomas Bramall

12 April 2026 32	Crystal Palace	2–1	Newcastle United	Selhurst
14:00 BST	Mateta 80', 90+4' (pen.)	Report	Osula 43'	Stadium: Selhurst Park; Attendance: 25,141; Referee: Andrew Madley
Note: Fixture was initially scheduled for 11 April, but was pushed back due to Palace's participation in the UEFA Conference League on the preceding Thursday.

20 April 2026 33	Crystal Palace	0–0	West Ham United	Selhurst
20:00 BST		Report		Stadium: Selhurst Park; Attendance: 24,974; Referee: Darren England
Note: Fixture was initially scheduled for 18 April, but was rearranged for live broadcasting.

25 April 2026 34	Liverpool	3–1	Crystal Palace	Liverpool
15:00 BST	Isak 35'; Robertson 40'; Wirtz 90+6'	Report	Muñoz 71'	Stadium: Anfield; Attendance: 60,314; Referee: Andrew Madley

3 May 2026 35	Bournemouth	3–0	Crystal Palace	Bournemouth
14:00 BST	Lerma 10' (o.g.); Kroupi 32' (pen.); Rayan 77'	Report		Stadium: Vitality Stadium; Attendance: 11,122; Referee: Robert Jones
Note: Fixture was initially scheduled for 2 May, but was rearranged due to Palace's participation in the UEFA Conference League on the preceding Thursday.

10 May 2026 36	Crystal Palace	2–2	Everton	Selhurst
14:00 BST	Sarr 34'; Mateta 77'	Report	Tarkowski 6'; Beto 47'	Stadium: Selhurst Park; Attendance: 24,958; Referee: Thomas Bramall
Note: Fixture was initially scheduled for 9 May, but was rearranged due to Palace's participation in the UEFA Conference League on the preceding Thursday.

13 May 2026 31	Manchester City	3–0	Crystal Palace	Manchester
20:00 BST	Semenyo 32'; Marmoush 40'; Savinho 84'	Report		Stadium: City of Manchester Stadium; Attendance: 51,738; Referee: Stuart Attwell
Note: Fixture was originally scheduled for 21 March 2026, but was rearranged due to Manchester City's participation in the EFL Cup final.

17 May 2026 37	Brentford	2–2	Crystal Palace	Brentford
15:00 BST	Ouattara 40', 88'	Report	Sarr 6' (pen.); Wharton 52'	Stadium: Brentford Community Stadium; Attendance: 17,213; Referee: Sam Barrott

24 May 2026 38	Crystal Palace	1–2	Arsenal	Selhurst
16:00 BST	Mateta 89'	Report	Gabriel Jesus 42'; Madueke 48'	Stadium: Selhurst Park; Attendance: 25,192; Referee: Farai Hallam

=== FA Cup ===
As a Premier League side, Palace entered the FA Cup in the third round, and were drawn away to Macclesfield. The team lost 2–1, in an upset considered the biggest in FA Cup history.

Win Draw Loss Fixtures

10 January 2026 Third round	Macclesfield	2–1	Crystal Palace	Macclesfield
12:15 GMT	Dawson 43'; Buckley-Ricketts 60'	Report	Pino 90'	Stadium: Moss Rose; Attendance: 5,348; Referee: Tim Robinson

=== EFL Cup ===
As one of the Premier League clubs participating in European competitions, Palace entered the EFL Cup in the third round, and were drawn at home to Millwall. They were then drawn away to Liverpool in the fourth round, and away to Arsenal in the quarter-finals.

Win Draw Loss Fixtures

16 September 2025 Third round	Crystal Palace	1–1 (4–2 p)	Millwall	Selhurst
20:00 BST	Richards 72'	Report	Leonard 90+1'	Stadium: Selhurst Park; Attendance: 16,754; Referee: John Busby
	Penalties
	Mateta (penalty scored); Richards (penalty scored); Devenny (penalty scored); Kamada (penalty scored)		(penalty missed) Crama; (penalty scored) Harding; (penalty scored) Leonard; (penalty missed) Emakhu

29 October 2025 Fourth round	Liverpool	0–3	Crystal Palace	Liverpool
19:45 GMT	Nallo (red card) 79'	Report	Sarr 41', 45'; Pino 88'	Stadium: Anfield; Attendance: 60,420; Referee: Craig Pawson

23 December 2025 Quarter-finals	Arsenal	1–1 (8–7 p)	Crystal Palace	Holloway
20:00 GMT	Lacroix 80' (o.g.)	Report	Guéhi 90+5'	Stadium: Emirates Stadium; Attendance: 59,497; Referee: Stuart Attwell
	Penalties
	Ødegaard (penalty scored); Rice (penalty scored); Saka (penalty scored); Trossard (penalty scored); Merino (penalty scored); Calafiori (penalty scored); Timber (penalty scored); Saliba (penalty scored)		(penalty scored) Mateta; (penalty scored) Devenny; (penalty scored) Hughes; (penalty scored) Sosa; (penalty scored) Lerma; (penalty scored) Wharton; (penalty scored) Uche; (penalty missed) Lacroix

=== FA Community Shield ===
As the defending FA Cup champions, Palace faced the reigning Premier League winners Liverpool in the FA Community Shield.

Crystal Palace won 3–2 on penalties after the match finished 2–2, thus winning their first FA Community Shield title in their debut appearance.

Win Draw Loss Fixtures

10 August 2025 Final	Crystal Palace	2–2 (3–2 p)	Liverpool	Wembley
15:00 BST	Mateta 17' (pen.); Sarr 77'	Report	Ekitike 4'; Frimpong 21'	Stadium: Wembley Stadium; Attendance: 82,645; Referee: Chris Kavanagh
	Penalties
	Mateta (penalty scored); Eze (penalty missed); Sarr (penalty scored); Sosa (penalty missed); Devenny (penalty scored)		(penalty missed) Salah; (penalty missed) Mac Allister; (penalty scored) Gakpo; (penalty missed) Elliott; (penalty scored) Szoboszlai

=== UEFA Conference League ===
Crystal Palace, as winners of the 2024–25 FA Cup, were initially meant to qualify for the league phase of the 2025–26 UEFA Europa League, however they were rejected the right to play in the competition due to multi-club ownership with fellow league phase qualifiers Lyon. Lyon's status in the competition was maintained due to having a higher league position than Palace at the end of the season. Despite an unsuccessful appeal to the Court of Arbitration for Sport, Palace were ultimately demoted to play in the play-off round of the 2025–26 UEFA Conference League instead.

==== Play-off round ====
Palace were drawn against the loser of the Europa League third qualifying round tie between Fredrikstad and Midtjylland, which was won by Midtjylland.

Win Draw Loss Fixtures

21 August 2025 First leg	Crystal Palace (England)	1–0	(Norway) Fredrikstad	London, England
20:00 BST	Mateta 54'	Report		Stadium: Selhurst Park; Attendance: 23,013; Referee: Anastasios Papapetrou (Greece)

28 August 2025 Second leg	Fredrikstad (Norway)	0–0 (0–1 agg.)	(England) Crystal Palace	Fredrikstad, Norway
19:00 CEST		Report		Stadium: Fredrikstad Stadion; Attendance: 10,016; Referee: Kristo Tohver (Estonia)

==== League phase ====
In the league phase, Palace were drawn against AEK Larnaca, AZ and KuPS at home, and Dynamo Kyiv, Strasbourg and Shelbourne away.

Pos	Team	Pld	W	D	L	GF	GA	GD	Pts	Qualification
8	(Cyprus Football Association) AEK Larnaca	6	3	3	0	7	1	+6	12	Advance to round of 16 (seeded)
9	(Swiss Football Association) Lausanne-Sport	6	3	2	1	6	3	+3	11	Advance to knockout phase play-offs (seeded)
10	(The Football Association) Crystal Palace	6	3	1	2	11	6	+5	10	Advance to knockout phase play-offs (seeded)
11	(Polish Football Association) Lech Poznań	6	3	1	2	12	8	+4	10	Advance to knockout phase play-offs (seeded)
12	(Turkish Football Federation) Samsunspor	6	3	1	2	10	6	+4	10	Advance to knockout phase play-offs (seeded)

Source: UEFA
Rules for classification: League phase tiebreakers

Round	1	2	3	4	5	6
Ground	A	H	H	A	A	H
Result	W	L	W	L	W	D
Position	7	16	9	18	9	10
Points	3	3	6	6	9	10

Source: UEFA
A = Away; H = Home; W = Win; D = Draw; L = Loss

Win Draw Loss Fixtures

2 October 2025 1	Dynamo Kyiv (Ukraine)	0–2	(England) Crystal Palace	Lublin, Poland
18:45 CEST		Report	Muñoz 31'; Nketiah 58'; Sosa (yellow card) 74' (yellow-red card) 76'	Stadium: Arena Lublin; Attendance: 6,839; Referee: Lothar D'Hondt (Belgium)
Note: Due to the Russian invasion of Ukraine, Ukrainian teams were required to play their home matches at neutral venues until further notice.

23 October 2025 2	Crystal Palace (England)	0–1	(Cyprus) AEK Larnaca	London, England
20:00 BST		Report	Bajić 51'	Stadium: Selhurst Park; Attendance: 23,038; Referee: Damian Kos (Poland)

6 November 2025 3	Crystal Palace (England)	3–1	(Netherlands) AZ	London, England
20:00 GMT	Mateta (penalty missed) 17'; Lacroix 22'; Sarr 45+4', 57'	Report	Mijnans 54'	Stadium: Selhurst Park; Attendance: 21,459; Referee: Daniele Chiffi (Italy)

27 November 2025 4	Strasbourg (France)	2–1	(England) Crystal Palace	Strasbourg, France
21:00 CET	Emegha 53'; El Mourabet 77'	Report	Mitchell 35'	Stadium: Stade de la Meinau; Attendance: 29,528; Referee: Javier Alberola Rojas (Spain)

11 December 2025 5	Shelbourne (Republic of Ireland)	0–3	(England) Crystal Palace	Dublin, Ireland
20:00 GMT		Report	Uche 11'; Nketiah 25'; Pino 37'	Stadium: Tallaght Stadium; Attendance: 10,134; Referee: Martin Matoša (Slovenia)
Note: The match was played at Tallaght Stadium in Dublin, instead of Shelbourne's home stadium, Tolka Park, as it did not meet UEFA requirements.

18 December 2025 6	Crystal Palace (England)	2–2	(Finland) KuPS	London, England
20:00 GMT	Uche 5'; Devenny 76'	Report	Parzyszek 50'; Cissé 53'; Antwi (red card) 73'	Stadium: Selhurst Park; Attendance: 21,306; Referee: Yigal Frid (Israel)

==== Knockout phase ====
===== Knockout phase play-offs =====
Crystal Palace were drawn against Zrinjski Mostar in the knockout phase play-offs, with the second leg at home.

19 February 2026 First leg	Zrinjski Mostar (Bosnia and Herzegovina)	1–1	(England) Crystal Palace	Mostar, Bosnia and Herzegovina
18:45 CET	Abramović 55'	Report	Sarr 43'	Stadium: Stadion pod Bijelim Brijegom; Attendance: 7,152; Referee: Manfredas Lukjančukas (Lithuania)

26 February 2026 Second leg	Crystal Palace (England)	2–0 (3–1 agg.)	(Bosnia and Herzegovina) Zrinjski Mostar	London, England
20:00 GMT	Lacroix 36'; Guessand 90+3'	Report		Stadium: Selhurst Park; Attendance: 18,049; Referee: Luís Godinho (Portugal)

===== Round of 16 =====
Crystal Palace were drawn against AEK Larnaca in the round of 16, with the first leg at home.

12 March 2026 First leg	Crystal Palace (England)	0–0	(Cyprus) AEK Larnaca	London, England
20:00 GMT		Report		Stadium: Selhurst Park; Attendance: 17,985; Referee: Igor Pajač (Croatia)

19 March 2026 Second leg	AEK Larnaca (Cyprus)	1–2 (a.e.t.) (1–2 agg.)	(England) Crystal Palace	Larnaca, Cyprus
19:45 EET	Saborit 63', (yellow card) 33' (yellow-red card) 74'; Ioannou (red card) 120+4'	Report	Sarr 13', 99'	Stadium: AEK Arena; Attendance: 7,019; Referee: Aliyar Aghayev (Azerbaijan)

===== Quarter-finals =====
Crystal Palace faced Fiorentina in the quarter-finals, with the first leg at home.

9 April 2026 First leg	Crystal Palace (England)	3–0	(Italy) Fiorentina	London, England
20:00 BST	Mateta 24' (pen.); Mitchell 31'; Sarr 90'	Report		Stadium: Selhurst Park; Attendance: 22,775; Referee: Donatas Rumšas (Lithuania)

16 April 2026 Second leg	Fiorentina (Italy)	2–1 (2–4 agg.)	(England) Crystal Palace	Florence, Italy
21:00 CEST	Guðmundsson 30' (pen.); Ndour 53'	Report	Sarr 17'	Stadium: Stadio Artemio Franchi; Attendance: 21,045; Referee: Jesús Gil Manzano (Spain)

===== Semi-finals =====
Crystal Palace faced Shakhtar Donetsk in the semi-finals, with the second leg at home.

30 April 2026 First leg	Shakhtar Donetsk (Ukraine)	1–3	(England) Crystal Palace	Kraków, Poland
21:00 CEST	Ocheretko 47'	Report	Sarr 1'; Kamada 58'; Larsen 84'	Stadium: Henryk Reyman Municipal Stadium; Attendance: 29,842; Referee: Felix Zwayer (Germany)
Note: Due to the Russian invasion of Ukraine, Ukrainian teams were required to play their home matches at neutral venues.

7 May 2026 Second leg	Crystal Palace (England)	2–1 (5–2 agg.)	(Ukraine) Shakhtar Donetsk	London, England
20:00 BST	Pedrinho 25' (o.g.); Sarr 52'	Report	Eguinaldo 34'	Stadium: Selhurst Park; Attendance: 23,080; Referee: Alejandro Hernández Hernández (Spain)

===== Final =====
Crystal Palace faced Spanish team Rayo Vallecano in the final at the Red Bull Arena in Leipzig, Germany.

27 May 2026 Final	Crystal Palace (England)	1–0	(Spain) Rayo Vallecano	Leipzig, Germany
21:00 CEST	Mateta 51'	Report		Stadium: Red Bull Arena; Attendance: 39,176; Referee: Maurizio Mariani (Italy)

== Statistics ==
=== Appearances ===
Players with no appearances are not included on the list.

No.	Pos	Nat	Player	Total		Premier League		FA Cup		EFL Cup		Community Shield		Conference League	
No.	Pos	Nat	Player	Apps	Goals	Apps	Goals	Apps	Goals	Apps	Goals	Apps	Goals	Apps	Goals
1	GK	(England) ENG	Dean Henderson	52	0	37	0	0	0	0	0	1	0	14	0
2	DF	(Colombia) COL	Daniel Muñoz	46	5	29	4	0	0	2	0	1	0	13+1	1
3	DF	(England) ENG	Tyrick Mitchell	55	3	36+2	1	0+1	0	1	0	1	0	11+3	2
5	DF	(France) FRA	Maxence Lacroix	55	3	35	1	0	0	3	0	1	0	16	2
7	FW	(Senegal) SEN	Ismaïla Sarr	45	21	24+4	9	0	0	1	2	1	1	14+1	9
8	MF	(Colombia) COL	Jefferson Lerma	48	0	18+13	0	0	0	1+2	0	0+1	0	6+7	0
9	FW	(England) ENG	Eddie Nketiah	19	4	2+10	2	0	0	2	0	0	0	1+4	2
10	MF	(Spain) ESP	Yéremy Pino	51	5	26+8	2	1	1	3	1	0	0	9+4	1
11	FW	(Wales) WAL	Brennan Johnson	25	0	13+5	0	0+1	0	0	0	0	0	3+3	0
12	FW	(Nigeria) NGR	Christantus Uche	22	2	0+14	0	1	0	0+3	0	0	0	2+2	2
14	FW	(France) FRA	Jean-Philippe Mateta	50	16	25+7	12	0	0	2+1	0	1	1	11+3	3
17	DF	(England) ENG	Nathaniel Clyne	14	0	7+3	0	0	0	0+1	0	0	0	0+3	0
18	MF	(Japan) JPN	Daichi Kamada	46	1	22+6	0	0	0	2	0	1	0	12+3	1
19	MF	(England) ENG	Will Hughes	48	0	19+12	0	0+1	0	2+1	0	0+1	0	5+7	0
20	MF	(England) ENG	Adam Wharton	53	1	29+5	1	1	0	1	0	1	0	13+3	0
22	FW	(Norway) NOR	Jørgen Strand Larsen	22	4	12+2	3	0	0	0	0	0	0	4+4	1
23	DF	(France) FRA	Jaydee Canvot	36	0	14+6	0	1	0	3	0	0	0	11+1	0
24	DF	(Croatia) CRO	Borna Sosa	18	0	0+7	0	1	0	2+1	0	0+1	0	6	0
26	DF	(United States) USA	Chris Richards	50	2	31+2	1	1	0	1+1	1	1	0	12+1	0
29	FW	(Ivory Coast) CIV	Evann Guessand	14	2	3+5	1	0	0	0	0	0	0	4+2	1
34	DF	(Morocco) MAR	Chadi Riad	12	0	6+3	0	0	0	0	0	0	0	2+1	0
42	MF	(England) ENG	Kaden Rodney	3	0	0+1	0	1	0	0	0	0	0	1	0
44	GK	(Argentina) ARG	Walter Benítez	8	0	1	0	1	0	3	0	0	0	3	0
55	MF	(Northern Ireland) NIR	Justin Devenny	32	2	7+14	1	1	0	0+3	0	0+1	0	3+3	1
59	DF	(Trinidad and Tobago) TTO	Rio Cardines	3	0	1	0	0	0	0+1	0	0	0	0+1	0
60	DF	(Republic of Ireland) IRL	George King	1	0	0	0	0	0	0	0	0	0	1	0
72	DF	(England) ENG	Dean Benamar	1	0	0	0	0	0	0	0	0	0	1	0
73	FW	(England) ENG	Benjamin Casey	2	0	0	0	0+1	0	0	0	0	0	0+1	0
86	DF	(England) ENG	Joél Drakes-Thomas	4	0	0+2	0	1	0	0	0	0	0	1	0
Player who featured but departed the club on loan during the season:
21	FW	(England) ENG	Romain Esse	8	0	0+4	0	0	0	1	0	0	0	1+2	0
Player(s) who featured but departed the club permanently during the season:
6	DF	(England) ENG	Marc Guéhi	33	3	20	2	1	0	3	1	1	0	7+1	0
10	FW	(England) ENG	Eberechi Eze	2	0	1	0	0	0	0	0	1	0	0	0
22	FW	(France) FRA	Odsonne Édouard	2	0	0+1	0	0	0	0	0	0	0	0+1	0

=== Goals ===
Rank	Pos.	No.	Player	Premier League	FA Cup	EFL Cup	Community Shield	Conference League	Total
1	FW	7	(Senegal) Ismaïla Sarr	9	0	2	1	9	21
2	FW	14	(France) Jean-Philippe Mateta	12	0	0	1	3	16
3	DF	2	(Colombia) Daniel Muñoz	4	0	0	0	1	5
3	MF	10	(Spain) Yéremy Pino	2	1	1	0	1	5
5	FW	9	(England) Eddie Nketiah	2	0	0	0	2	4
5	FW	22	(Norway) Jørgen Strand Larsen	3	0	0	0	1	4
7	DF	3	(England) Tyrick Mitchell	1	0	0	0	2	3
7	DF	5	(France) Maxence Lacroix	1	0	0	0	2	3
7	DF	6	(England) Marc Guéhi	2	0	1	0	0	3
10	FW	12	(Nigeria) Christantus Uche	0	0	0	0	2	2
10	DF	26	(United States) Chris Richards	1	0	1	0	0	2
10	FW	29	(Ivory Coast) Evann Guessand	1	0	0	0	1	2
10	MF	55	(Northern Ireland) Justin Devenny	1	0	0	0	1	2
14	MF	18	(Japan) Daichi Kamada	0	0	0	0	1	1
14	MF	20	(England) Adam Wharton	1	0	0	0	0	1
Own goals				1	0	0	0	1	2
Total				41	1	5	2	27	76

=== Clean sheets ===
Rank	No.	Player	Premier League	FA Cup	EFL Cup	Community Shield	Conference League	Total
1	1	(England) Dean Henderson	11	0	0	0	7	18
2	44	(Argentina) Walter Benítez	1	0	1	0	1	3
Total			12	0	1	0	8	21

=== Disciplinary record ===
Rank	No.	Pos.	Player	Premier League			FA Cup			EFL Cup			Community Shield			Conference League			Total		
Rank	No.	Pos.	Player	Yellow card	(yellow card) (yellow-red card)	Red card	Yellow card	(yellow card) (yellow-red card)	Red card	Yellow card	(yellow card) (yellow-red card)	Red card	Yellow card	(yellow card) (yellow-red card)	Red card	Yellow card	(yellow card) (yellow-red card)	Red card	Yellow card	(yellow card) (yellow-red card)	Red card
1	5	DF	(France) Maxence Lacroix	4	0	1	0	0	0	0	0	0	0	0	0	2	0	0	6	0	1
2	20	MF	(England) Adam Wharton	4	1	0	0	0	0	0	0	0	0	0	0	3	0	0	7	1	0
3	10	MF	(Spain) Yéremy Pino	4	0	0	0	0	0	1	0	0	0	0	0	3	0	0	8	0	0
3	19	MF	(England) Will Hughes	7	0	0	0	0	0	1	0	0	0	0	0	0	0	0	8	0	0
5	2	DF	(Colombia) Daniel Muñoz	7	0	0	0	0	0	0	0	0	0	0	0	0	0	0	7	0	0
5	6	DF	(England) Marc Guéhi	4	0	0	1	0	0	0	0	0	0	0	0	2	0	0	7	0	0
5	8	MF	(Colombia) Jefferson Lerma	7	0	0	0	0	0	0	0	0	0	0	0	0	0	0	7	0	0
8	24	DF	(Croatia) Borna Sosa	1	0	0	1	0	0	0	0	0	0	0	0	3	1	0	5	1	0
9	3	DF	(England) Tyrick Mitchell	6	0	0	0	0	0	0	0	0	0	0	0	0	0	0	6	0	0
9	23	DF	(France) Jaydee Canvot	3	0	0	0	0	0	0	0	0	0	0	0	3	0	0	6	0	0
11	26	DF	(United States) Chris Richards	4	0	0	0	0	0	0	0	0	0	0	0	2	0	0	6	0	0
13	1	GK	(England) Dean Henderson	5	0	0	0	0	0	0	0	0	0	0	0	0	0	0	5	0	0
13	22	FW	(Norway) Jørgen Strand Larsen	2	0	0	0	0	0	0	0	0	0	0	0	3	0	0	5	0	0
15	7	FW	(Senegal) Ismaïla Sarr	2	0	0	0	0	0	0	0	0	0	0	0	2	0	0	4	0	0
15	11	FW	(Wales) Brennan Johnson	4	0	0	0	0	0	0	0	0	0	0	0	0	0	0	4	0	0
15	14	FW	(France) Jean-Philippe Mateta	2	0	0	0	0	0	0	0	0	0	0	0	2	0	0	4	0	0
15	18	FW	(Japan) Daichi Kamada	3	0	0	0	0	0	1	0	0	0	0	0	0	0	0	4	0	0
15	34	DF	(Morocco) Chadi Riad	2	0	0	0	0	0	0	0	0	0	0	0	2	0	0	4	0	0
20	9	FW	(England) Eddie Nketiah	2	0	0	0	0	0	0	0	0	0	0	0	1	0	0	3	0	0
21	17	DF	(England) Nathaniel Clyne	1	0	0	0	0	0	0	0	0	0	0	0	0	0	0	1	0	0
21	21	FW	(England) Romain Esse	0	0	0	0	0	0	0	0	0	0	0	0	1	0	0	1	0	0
Total				74	1	1	3	0	0	3	0	0	0	0	0	32	1	0	112	2	1
