= Crystal Palace F.C. Under-21s and Academy =

English football development team

Crystal Palace Under-21s and Academy
- Full name: Crystal Palace Football Club Under-21s and Academy
- Nickname: The Eagles
- Ground: Crystal Palace Training Ground (Beckenham); Selhurst Park
- Capacity: 1,000 (Training Ground); 25,486 (Selhurst Park)
- Owner(s): Steve Parish; Joshua Harris; David Blitzer; Woody Johnson
- Chairman: Steve Parish
- Manager: Darren Powell (U21); Javier Alonso (U18)
- League: Premier League 2 (under-21s); U18 Premier League (academy)
Home colours	Away colours	Third colours

The Crystal Palace F.C. Under-21s is the Under-21 Development team of Crystal Palace Football Club. They play in Premier League 2, the top level of reserve football in England and also compete in the Premier League Cup, Premier League International Cup and EFL Trophy.

The Crystal Palace F.C. Academy consists of the Under-18s and also lower-age group youth teams of Crystal Palace Football Club. The Under-18 team compete in the U18 Premier League, U18 Premier League Cup and FA Youth Cup. The academy has produced a number of well known international players over the years such as Johnny Byrne, Kenny Sansom, Peter Nicholas, Gareth Southgate and Wilfried Zaha.

The academy was significantly upgraded in 2020 to achieve Category One status, the highest classification in English football, and was officially opened in 2021 by former Palace academy graduate Gareth Southgate.

== U21 Development squad ==
As of 15 September 2026

Note: Flags indicate national team as defined under FIFA eligibility rules; some limited exceptions apply. Players may hold more than one non-FIFA nationality.

No.	Pos.	Nation	Player
37	DF	IRL	George King
38	DF	ENG	Caleb Kporha
40	MF	IRL	Joseph Gibbard
41	GK	ENG	Harry Lee
43	MF	ENG	Sebastian Williams
45	DF	MAR	Taha Majni
47	FW	POR	Adler Nascimento
48	DF	USA	Tyler Whyte
50	MF	TTO	Kai-Reece Adams-Collman
51	GK	ENG	Marcus Hill

No.	Pos.	Nation	Player
53	FW	ENG	Benjamin Casey
54	DF	ENG	Dean Benamar
56	DF	WAL	Charlie Walker-Smith
57	DF	ENG	Sean Somade
58	MF	ENG	Chuks Okoli
59	FW	ENG	David Angibeaud
60	DF	ENG	Jasper Judd
62	MF	ENG	Euan Danaher
64	MF	ENG	Amaari Sealey
86	FW	ENG	Joél Drakes-Thomas

=== Out on loan ===
The loans listed here are only for under-21 squad players who have not yet made a competitive appearance for the first team or been called into the first team squad for a competitive fixture.

Note: Flags indicate national team as defined under FIFA eligibility rules; some limited exceptions apply. Players may hold more than one non-FIFA nationality.

No. / Pos. / Nation / Player; — / MF / SLE / Hindolo Mustapha (at Notts County until end of 2026–27 season)	No. / Pos. / Nation / Player

== U18 Academy squad ==
As of 15 September 2026

Note: Flags indicate national team as defined under FIFA eligibility rules; some limited exceptions apply. Players may hold more than one non-FIFA nationality.

No.	Pos.	Nation	Player
63	DF	ENG	Khyan Frazer-Williams
65	DF	ENG	Nathanael Kalembo
71	GK	ENG	Thiago Speroni
72	DF	ENG	Jacob Fasida
73	MF	ENG	Raihaan Anderson
74	FW	ENG	Makai Bernard-Ferguson
75	DF	ENG	Ajean-Ray Greaves
77	FW	ENG	Donte Martin
78	FW	ENG	Jayden McDonald
79	DF	ENG	Aiden Morgan
80	DF	ENG	Daniel Owoade
81	GK	ENG	Lucca Benetton
82	DF	ENG	Remi Ahazie-Shittu

No.	Pos.	Nation	Player
88	MF	ENG	Jay-Emmanuel Jordan
89	MF	ENG	Jamar Lee
90	DF	ENG	Dylan Monk
91	MF	ENG	Kayden Moses
93	DF	ENG	Malik Tejan
94	FW	ENG	Toby Williams
96	MF	ENG	Sebastian Bonsu-Amako
—	DF	NIR	Alfie Mulvenna
—	DF	ENG	Anthony Barrett
—	DF	ENG	Hugo Bull
—	FW	USA	Kairo Smith-Phillips
—	FW	ENG	Oladotun Lamidi
—	FW	ENG	Kwasi Baah

== Honours ==
=== Reserves/Development Squad ===
- Premier League International Cup
  - Winners (1): 2023–24
  - Runners-up (1): 2022–23
- Premier League 2 Division 2
  - Play-off Winners (1): 2020–21
- The Football Combination
  - Champions (1): 2002–03
  - Runners-up (1): 2001–02
- Kent League
  - Champions (1): 1913–14
  - Runners-up (2): 1910–11, 1912–13

=== Academy ===
- FA Youth Cup
  - Winners (2): 1976–77, 1977–78
  - Runners-up (2): 1991–92, 1996–97
- U18 Premier League Cup
  - Winners (1): 2025–26
- U18 Premier League – South Group
  - Runners-up (1): 2020–21
- U15 National Floodlit Cup
  - Winners (2): 2018–19, 2022–23
  - Runners-up (1): 2021–22
- U15 National Floodlit Shield
  - Runners-up (1): 2025–26
- Southern Junior Floodlit Cup
  - Winners (1): 1996–97
  - Runners-up (1): 1976–77
- U14 Orange Veins OH Leuven Cup
  - Winners (1): 2026

== Notable Academy graduates ==
Former academy players listed below who have progressed to the first team to make at least 100 appearances for Crystal Palace.

- (England) Roy Bailey
- (England) Peter Berry
- (England) Johnny Byrne
- (England) Bill Glazier
- (England) Alan Stephenson
- (England) David Payne
- (England) John Jackson
- (England) Steve Kember
- (England) Paul Hammond
- (England) David Swindlehurst
- (England) Nick Chatterton
- (England) Paul Hinshelwood
- (England) Kenny Sansom
- (England) Vince Hilaire
- (England) Billy Gilbert
- (England) John Salako
- (England) Richard Shaw
- (England) Gareth Southgate
- (England) Dean Gordon
- (England) Hayden Mullins
- (England) Wayne Routledge
- (England) Ben Watson
- (England) Tom Soares
- (England) Nathaniel Clyne
- (England) Tyrick Mitchell
- (Ivory Coast) Wilfried Zaha
- (Republic of Ireland) Jerry Murphy
- (Republic of Ireland) Clinton Morrison
- (Republic of Ireland) Sean Scannell
- (Nigeria) George Ndah
- (Scotland) Jim Cannon
- (Wales) Ian Walsh
- (Wales) Peter Nicholas

== Development Player of the Year Award ==
Year	Winner
1983	(England) Gary Stebbing
1984	(England) Gary Stebbing
1985	(England) David Lindsay
1986	(England) Richard Shaw
1987	(England) John Salako
1988	(England) John Salako
1989	(England) David Stevens
1990	(England) Simon Osborn
1991	(England) Dean Gordon
1992	(Scotland) Mark Hawthorne
1993	(Nigeria) George Ndah
1994	(Republic of Ireland) Brian Launders
1995	No award
1996	No award
1997	No award

Year	Winner
1998	No award
1999	No award
2000	No award
2001	No award
2002	(England) Julian Gray
2003	(England) Wayne Routledge
2004	(England) Wayne Routledge
2005	(England) Tom Soares
2006	(England) Ben Watson
2007	(England) Gary Borrowdale
2008	(Republic of Ireland) Sean Scannell
2009	(England) Nathaniel Clyne
2010	(England) Nathaniel Clyne
2011	(Ivory Coast) Wilfried Zaha
2012	(Ivory Coast) Wilfried Zaha

Year	Winner
2013	(Wales) Jonny Williams
2014	(England) Joel Ward
2015	(Sierra Leone) Sullay Kaikai
2016	(England) Hiram Boateng
2017	(England) Kevin Gonzalez
2018	(England) Aaron Wan-Bissaka
2019	(Republic of Ireland) Kian Flanagan
2020	(England) Malachi Boateng
2021	(England) Reece Hannam
2022	(England) Jesurun Rak-Sakyi
2023	(England) David Ozoh
2024	(England) Joe Whitworth
2025	(Sierra Leone) Hindolo Mustapha
2026	(Republic of Ireland) George King

Note: This award was previously known as Young Player of the Year until 2015.
