= Benjamin Casey =

English footballer (born 2008)

Personal information
- Full name: Benjamin Omena Akpowubrunei Casey
- Date of birth: 4 February 2008 (age 18)
- Place of birth: London, England
- Position: Striker

Team information
- Current team: Crystal Palace
- Number: 53

Youth career
- 2017–2025: Crystal Palace

Senior career*
Years	Team	Apps	(Gls)
2025–	Crystal Palace	0	(0)

International career^{‡}
2023	England U16	2	(0)
2025–	England U18	4	(0)
- * Club domestic league appearances and goals as of 16 December 2025 (UTC) ‡ National team caps and goals as of 12:29, 16 April 2026 (UTC)

Benjamin Omena Akpowubrunei Casey (born 4 February 2008) is an English professional footballer who plays as a striker for Premier League club Crystal Palace. He is an England youth international.

== Club career ==
Born in London in February 2008, Casey joined the youth set-up at Crystal Palace at under-9 level and played as Palace reached the under-11 national final for the first time in the club's history. He made his Crystal Palace U18 debut in March 2024, in a Premier League Cup semi-final against Manchester United U18. His first U18 goal followed the following week against Arsenal U18. In July 2024, Casey signed a scholarship deal with Palace prior to the start of the 2024–25 season.

Casey scored 12 goals as a first-year scholar for the Palace Under-18s in the 2024–25 season, before scoring a further 11 goals in seven appearances at the start of the 2025–26 season, prior to signing a first professional contract with the club.

Casey made his professional debut for Palace appearing as a second-half substitute for Justin Devenny in the UEFA Conference League on 11 December 2025, in a 3–0 away win against Irish club Shelbourne. Palace's manager Oliver Glasner when asked about Casey's first-team debut said “He's doing very well in our youth team. He's scoring goals, he's got a great profile, he's got a pace, and that's why he deserves it". Casey was quoted as saying “It was a great day. It was something that I've been dreaming about my whole life".

== International career ==
In August 2023, Casey represented England U16 against Italy. He played for England U18 against France U18 in October 2025.

== Personal life ==
Casey is of Nigerian descent.

== Career statistics ==
As of match played 10 January 2026

Appearances and goals by club, season and competition
Club	Season	League			FA Cup		EFL Cup		Europe		Other		Total	
Club	Season	Division	Apps	Goals	Apps	Goals	Apps	Goals	Apps	Goals	Apps	Goals	Apps	Goals
Crystal Palace	2025–26	Premier League	0	0	1	0	0	0	1 (Note: Appearance in UEFA Conference League)	0	0	0	2	0
Career total			0	0	1	0	0	0	1	0	0	0	2	0
