= Caleb Kporha =

English footballer (born 2006)

Personal information
- Full name: Caleb Billy Mawuko Kporha
- Date of birth: 15 July 2006 (age 20)
- Place of birth: Medway, England
- Height: 1.70 m (5 ft 7 in)
- Positions: Right-back; right wing-back

Team information
- Current team: Crystal Palace
- Number: 38

Youth career
- 2018–2021: Welling United
- 2021–2024: Crystal Palace

Senior career*
Years	Team	Apps	(Gls)
2024–	Crystal Palace	2	(0)

International career^{‡}
2023	England U17	2	(0)
2025	England U19	6	(0)
- * Club domestic league appearances and goals as of 21 December 2024 (UTC) ‡ National team caps and goals as of 09:10, 21 June 2025 (UTC)

Caleb Billy Mawuko Kporha (born 15 July 2006) is an English professional footballer who plays as a right-back or right wing-back for Premier League club Crystal Palace. He is an England youth international.

== Club career ==
=== Crystal Palace ===
Kporha spent three years at Welling United prior to joining Crystal Palace in December 2021. He signed his first professional contract with the club in July 2023.

Kporha travelled with the Crystal Palace first team squad on their pre season tour in the summer of 2024. He played for the Crystal Palace under 21 team in the EFL Trophy in September 2024. He made the first team substitute bench for the first time on 5 October 2024, for Palace's home Premier League match against Liverpool.

Kporha made his Premier League debut on 9 November 2024, appearing as a second-half substitute at home against Fulham. The following month he made his first start for the club in an EFL Cup quarter-final against Arsenal. On 3 April 2025, Kporha signed a new four-year contract with Palace.

== International career ==
In January 2023 Kporha represented England U17 against Germany.

Kporha made his debut for England U19 in a goalless qualifier with Turkey. He was a member of their squad at the 2025 UEFA European Under-19 Championship and featured in all three of their games at the tournament against Norway, Germany and Netherlands as England were eliminated at the group stage.

== Career statistics ==
As of match played 10 February 2025

Appearances and goals by club, season and competition
Club	Season	League			FA Cup		EFL Cup		Europe		Other		Total	
Club	Season	Division	Apps	Goals	Apps	Goals	Apps	Goals	Apps	Goals	Apps	Goals	Apps	Goals
Crystal Palace	2024–25	Premier League	2	0	1	0	1	0	—		—		4	0
Crystal Palace	2025–26	Premier League	0	0	0	0	0	0	0	0	0	0	0	0
Career total			2	0	1	0	1	0	0	0	0	0	4	0
