= Kaden Rodney =

English association football player

Personal information
- Full name: Kaden Kai Rodney
- Date of birth: 7 October 2004 (age 22)
- Place of birth: Lambeth, England
- Position: Defensive midfielder

Team information
- Current team: Muaither

Youth career
- 2013–2022: Crystal Palace

Senior career*
Years	Team	Apps	(Gls)
2022–2026	Crystal Palace	1	(0)
2026–	Muaither	0	(0)

International career^{‡}
2021	England U18	3	(0)
- * Club domestic league appearances and goals as of 17:04, 4 January 2026 (UTC) ‡ National team caps and goals as of 15 November 2021 (UTC)

Kaden Kai Rodney (born 7 October 2004) is an English professional footballer who plays as a defensive midfielder for Qatar Stars League 2 club Muaither.

== Early life ==
Rodney was brought up in South East London and attended Friars primary foundation school in Southwark.

== Club career ==
Rodney joined Crystal Palace at the age of eight, progressing through the academy before signing his first professional contract in October 2021. He made his senior debut for the club against Oxford United in the EFL Cup in August 2022. Rodney was included in the match day squad for the Premier League game against Burnley on 24 February 2024, but was an unused substitute. On 10 June 2026, it was announced that Rodney would be leaving the club at the end of the month. On 9 August 2026, Rodney joined Qatar Stars League 2 side Muaither.

== International career ==
Rodney has made three appearances for the England U18 team.

== Career statistics ==
As of match played 10 January 2026

Appearances and goals by club, season and competition
Club	Season	League			FA Cup		EFL Cup		Europe		Other		Total	
Club	Season	Division	Apps	Goals	Apps	Goals	Apps	Goals	Apps	Goals	Apps	Goals	Apps	Goals
Crystal Palace U21	2022–23	—			—		—		—		2 (Note: Appearance(s) in EFL Trophy)	0	2	0
Crystal Palace U21	2023–24	—			—		—		—		1	0	1	0
Crystal Palace U21	2024–25	—			—		—		—		2	0	2	0
Crystal Palace U21	2025–26	—			—		—		—		2	1	2	1
Crystal Palace U21	Total		—		—		—		—		7	1	7	1
Crystal Palace	2022–23	Premier League	0	0	0	0	1	0	—		—		1	0
Crystal Palace	2023–24	Premier League	0	0	0	0	0	0	—		—		0	0
Crystal Palace	2024–25	Premier League	0	0	0	0	0	0	—		—		0	0
Crystal Palace	2025–26	Premier League	1	0	1	0	0	0	1 (Note: Appearance in UEFA Conference League)	0	0	0	3	0
Crystal Palace	Total		1	0	1	0	1	0	1	0	0	0	4	0
Career total			1	0	1	0	1	0	1	0	7	1	11	1

== Honours ==
Crystal Palace

- UEFA Conference League: 2025–26
