= David Lindsay (English footballer) =

English footballer

Personal information
- Full name: David James Lindsay
- Date of birth: 17 May 1966 (age 60)
- Place of birth: Havering, Greater London
- Height: 5 ft 8 in (1.73 m)
- Position: Left back

Youth career
- ?–1984: Crystal Palace

Senior career*
Years	Team	Apps	(Gls)
1984–1986	Crystal Palace	21	(0)
1986	Kuopion Elo	19	(4)
1987–1989	Welling United	63	(4)
- * Club domestic league appearances and goals

David James Lindsay (born 17 May 1966) is an English former professional footballer who played in the Football League for Crystal Palace as a left back.

He began his youth career at Crystal Palace and signed professional terms in May 1984. His league debut, however, was in December 1983, in a home 1–2 defeat to Carlisle United, but it was his only appearance that season. In season 1984–85 he made 11 appearances and in 1985–86 began the season as first choice left back but played only nine times. In the 1986 close season, Lindsay moved on to play for Finnish club Kuopion Elo, before signing for Welling United in March 1987, where he made 63 appearances over the next two seasons.
