= Maxence Lacroix =

French footballer (born 2000)

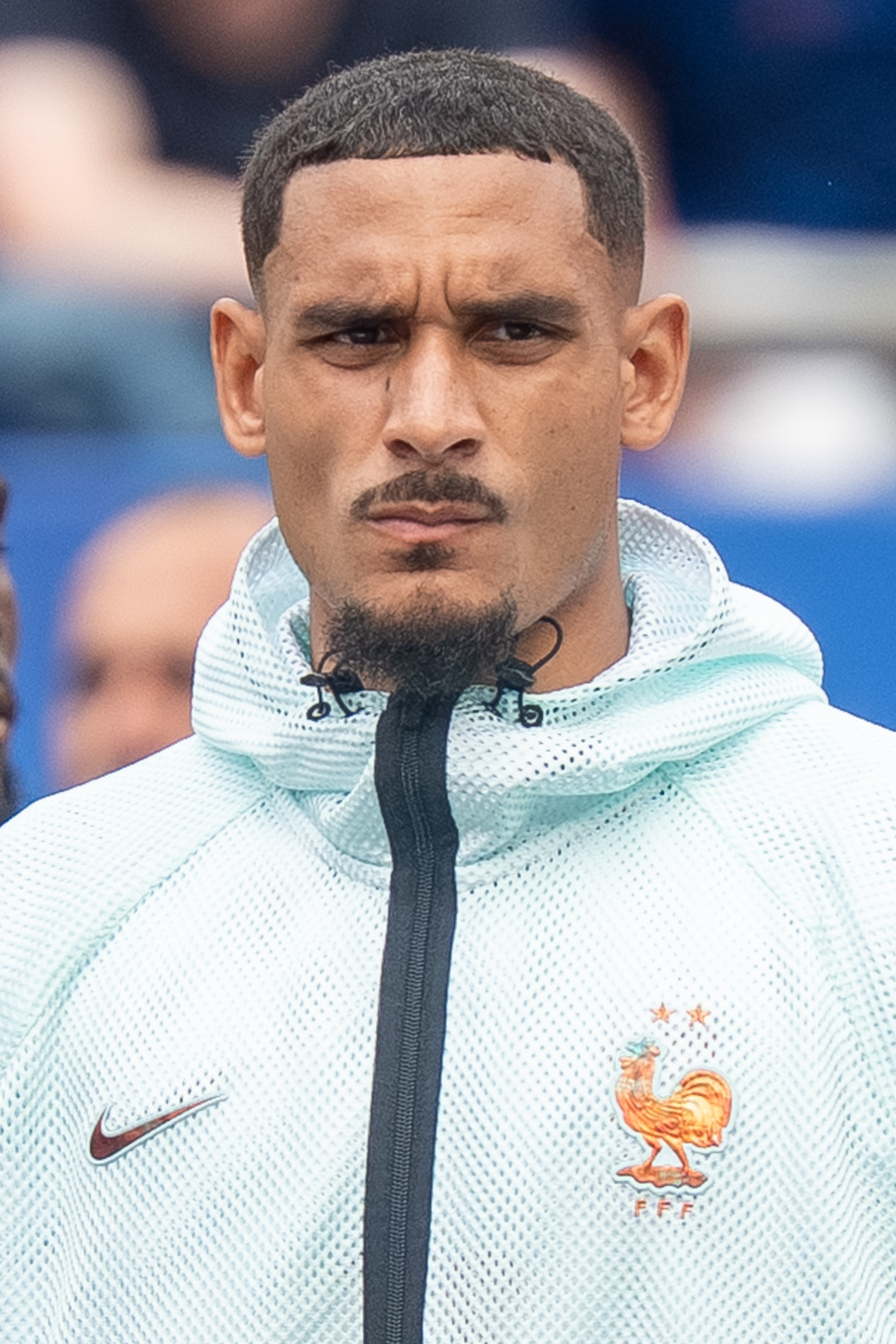
- Lacroix with France in 2026

Personal information
- Full name: Maxence Guy Lacroix
- Date of birth: 6 April 2000 (age 26)
- Place of birth: Villeneuve-Saint-Georges, France
- Height: 1.90 m (6 ft 3 in)
- Position: Centre-back

Team information
- Current team: Chelsea
- Number: 5

Youth career
- 2006–2008: Limeyrat
- 2008–2011: Montignacoise
- 2011–2012: FCTLF
- 2012–2015: Trélissac
- 2015–2017: Sochaux

Senior career*
| Years | Team | Apps | (Gls) |
| 2017–2019 | Sochaux II | 13 | (0) |
| 2018–2020 | Sochaux | 27 | (0) |
| 2020–2024 | VfL Wolfsburg | 111 | (6) |
| 2024–2026 | Crystal Palace | 70 | (2) |
| 2026– | Chelsea | 8 | (0) |

International career^{‡}
| 2016 | France U16 | 1 | (0) |
| 2017 | France U17 | 4 | (0) |
| 2017 | France U18 | 5 | (0) |
| 2019 | France U20 | 2 | (0) |
| 2026– | France | 11 | (0) |
- * Club domestic league appearances and goals as of 24 October 2026 ‡ National team caps and goals as of 20:46, 5 October 2026 (UTC)

Maxence Guy Lacroix (French pronunciation: [maksɑ̃s lakʁwa]; born 6 April 2000) is a French professional footballer who plays as a centre-back for Premier League club Chelsea and the France national team.

Lacroix began his career at Sochaux, where he made his senior debut in 2018. He signed for Bundesliga side VfL Wolfsburg in 2020, spending four seasons in Germany before moving to Crystal Palace in 2024, where he won the FA Cup, Community Shield and UEFA Conference League.

A former France youth international, Lacroix made his debut for the senior team in 2026, and later appeared at the 2026 FIFA World Cup.

== Club career ==
=== Sochaux ===
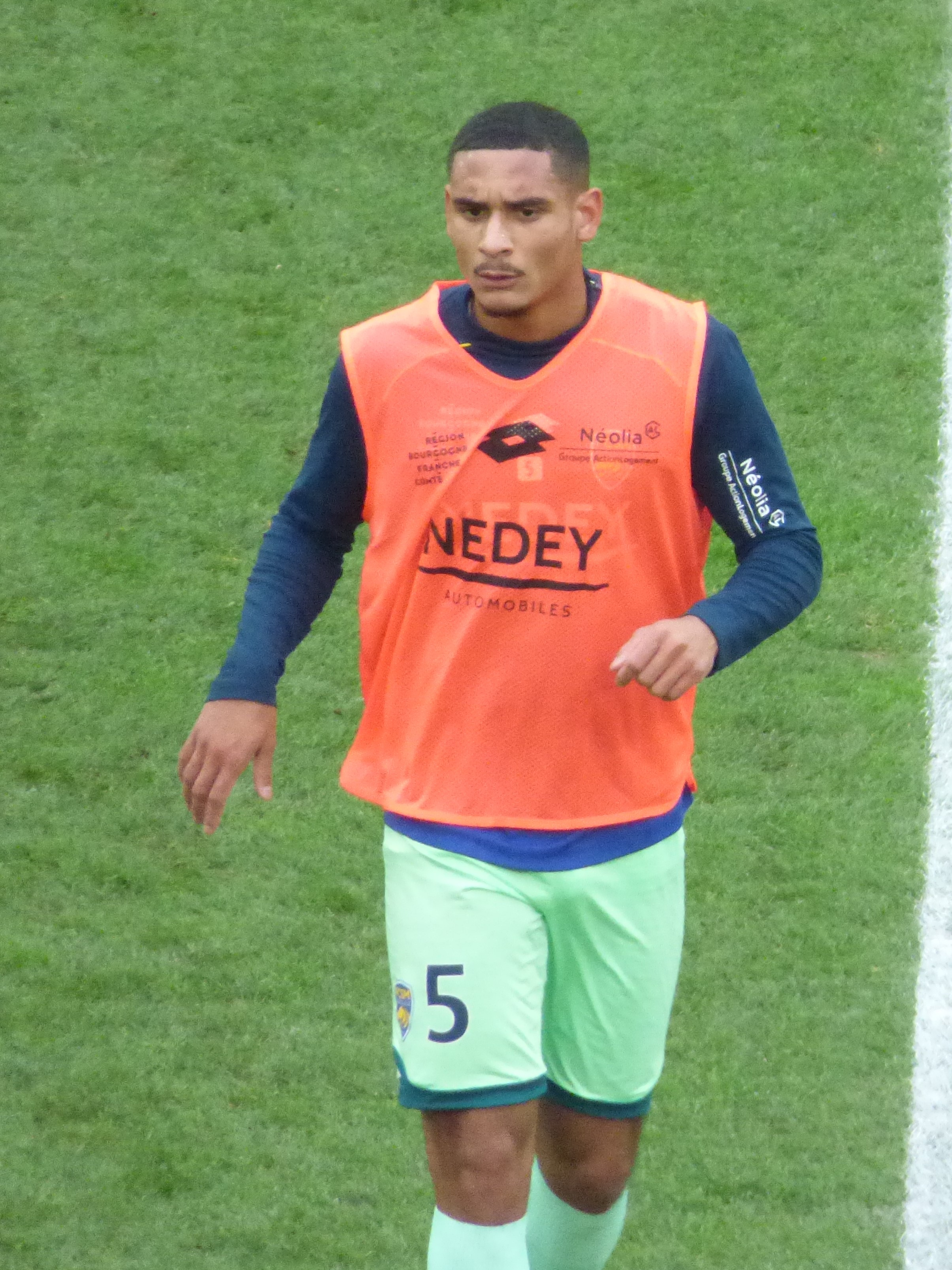
Lacroix with Sochaux in 2019

On 21 August 2017, Lacroix signed his first professional contract with FC Sochaux-Montbéliard. Lacroix made his professional debut with Sochaux in a 1–0 Ligue 2 win over FC Lorient on 22 December 2018.

=== VfL Wolfsburg ===
On 25 August 2020, Lacroix joined VfL Wolfsburg on a four-year deal. On 27 February 2021, he scored his first Bundesliga goal in a 2–0 win over Hertha BSC.

=== Crystal Palace ===
On 30 August 2024, Premier League club Crystal Palace signed Lacroix for £18m on a five-year deal, reuniting him with former Wolfsburg manager Oliver Glasner. He scored his first goal for the club in a 2–2 draw against Manchester City on 7 December. He played for the entirety of the 2025 FA Cup final on 17 May 2025 as the club defeated City 1–0 to win its first ever major trophy.

Lacroix scored his first European goal for the club on 6 November 2025, firing home in the 22nd minute as Palace won 3–1 against AZ Alkmaar at Selhurst Park in the UEFA Conference League. He scored again on 26 February 2026 in the knockout round play-off second leg against HŠK Zrinjski Mostar, heading home from an Adam Wharton free-kick in the 36th minute as Palace won 2–0 on the night and 3–1 on aggregate to advance to the round of 16. In the Premier League, he headed Palace into an early lead at Old Trafford against Manchester United on 1 March from a Brennan Johnson corner, but was sent off in the 52nd minute; United recovered to win 2–1. On 27 May, Lacroix played the full 90 minutes in the 2026 UEFA Conference League final as Palace defeated Rayo Vallecano 1–0, securing the club's first ever European trophy.

=== Chelsea ===
On 30 July 2026, Lacroix signed a six-year contract with Chelsea until 2032 for a reported deal of £52 million.

== International career ==
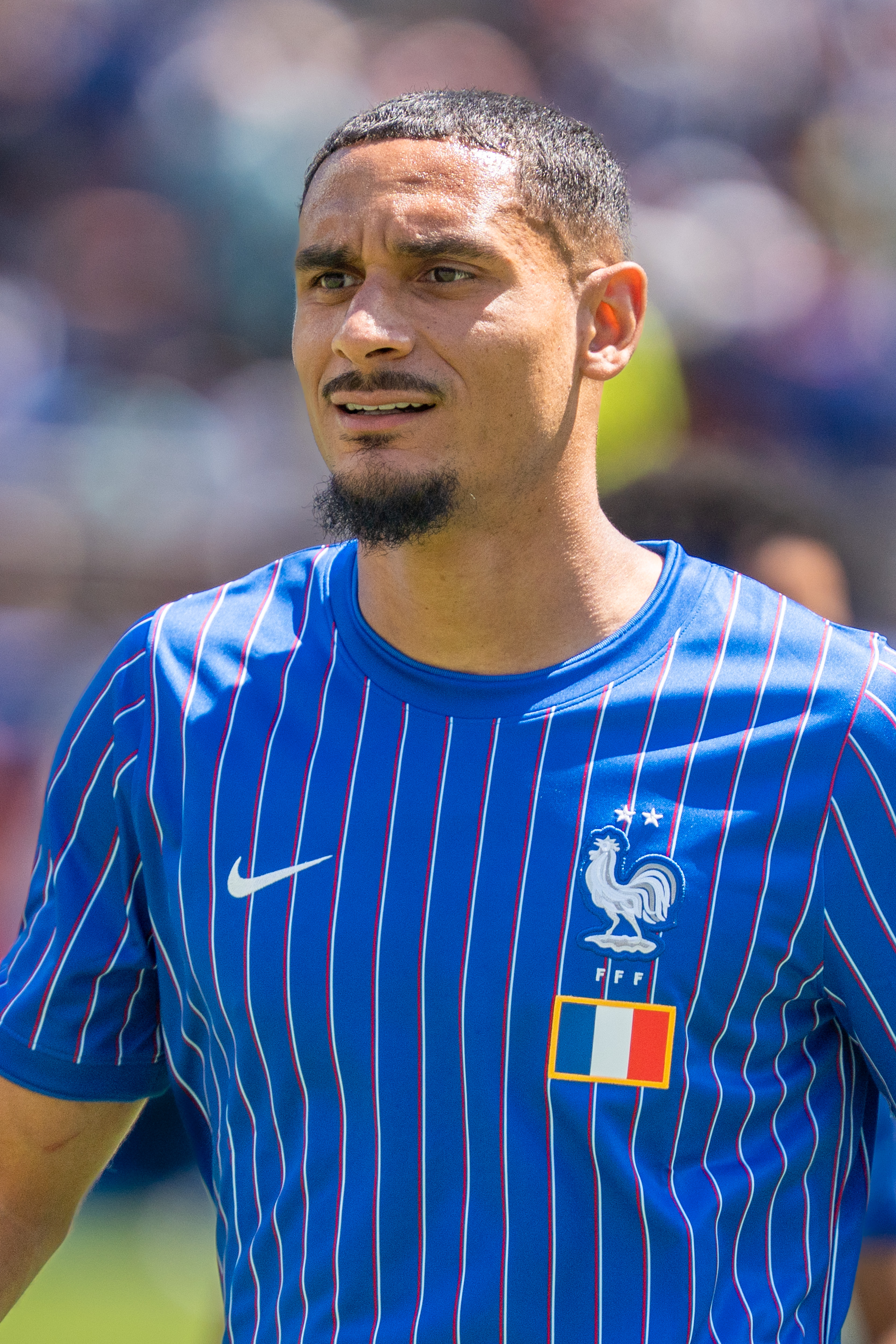
Lacroix during the 2026 World Cup

Lacroix is a youth international for France, and represented the France U17s at the 2017 UEFA European Under-17 Championship and 2017 FIFA U-17 World Cup.

On 22 March 2026, Lacroix received his first call-up to the senior France national team, for friendlies against Brazil and Colombia.

On 14 May 2026, Lacroix was selected in the 26-man squad for the 2026 FIFA World Cup.

== Personal life ==
Lacroix was born in Villeneuve-Saint-Georges, Val-de-Marne, and grew up in Ajat, Dordogne. His father is a nurse and his mother a doctor. He is of Guadeloupean and Malagasy descent through his father and mother. He is a devout Christian.

== Career statistics ==
=== Club ===
As of match played 28 October 2026

Appearances and goals by club, season and competition
| Club | Season | League | | | National cup (Note: Includes Coupe de France, DFB-Pokal, FA Cup) | | League cup (Note: Includes EFL Cup) | | Europe | | Other | | Total | |
| Club | Season | Division | Apps | Goals | Apps | Goals | Apps | Goals | Apps | Goals | Apps | Goals | Apps | Goals |
|---|---|---|---|---|---|---|---|---|---|---|---|---|---|---|
| Sochaux II | 2017–18 | Championnat National 3 | 1 | 0 | — | | — | | — | | — | | 1 | 0 |
| Sochaux II | 2018–19 | Championnat National 3 | 12 | 0 | — | | — | | — | | — | | 12 | 0 |
| Sochaux II | 2019–20 | Championnat National 3 | 0 | 0 | — | | — | | — | | — | | 0 | 0 |
| Sochaux II | Total | | 13 | 0 | — | | — | | — | | — | | 13 | 0 |
| Sochaux | 2018–19 | Ligue 2 | 7 | 0 | 1 | 0 | 0 | 0 | — | | — | | 8 | 0 |
| Sochaux | 2019–20 | Ligue 2 | 20 | 0 | 0 | 0 | 0 | 0 | — | | — | | 20 | 0 |
| Sochaux | Total | | 27 | 0 | 1 | 0 | 0 | 0 | — | | — | | 28 | 0 |
| VfL Wolfsburg | 2020–21 | Bundesliga | 30 | 1 | 3 | 0 | — | | 3 (Note: Appearances in UEFA Europa League) | 1 | — | | 36 | 2 |
| VfL Wolfsburg | 2021–22 | Bundesliga | 29 | 0 | 1 | 0 | — | | 6 (Note: Appearances in UEFA Champions League) | 0 | — | | 36 | 0 |
| VfL Wolfsburg | 2022–23 | Bundesliga | 24 | 1 | 2 | 0 | — | | — | | — | | 26 | 1 |
| VfL Wolfsburg | 2023–24 | Bundesliga | 28 | 4 | 3 | 0 | — | | — | | — | | 31 | 4 |
| VfL Wolfsburg | 2024–25 | Bundesliga | 0 | 0 | 1 | 0 | — | | — | | — | | 1 | 0 |
| VfL Wolfsburg | Total | | 111 | 6 | 10 | 0 | — | | 9 | 1 | — | | 130 | 7 |
| Crystal Palace | 2024–25 | Premier League | 35 | 1 | 5 | 0 | 3 | 0 | — | | — | | 43 | 1 |
| Crystal Palace | 2025–26 | Premier League | 35 | 1 | 0 | 0 | 3 | 0 | 16 (Note: Appearances in UEFA Conference League) | 2 | 1 (Note: Appearance in FA Community Shield) | 0 | 55 | 3 |
| Crystal Palace | Total | | 70 | 2 | 5 | 0 | 6 | 0 | 16 | 2 | 1 | 0 | 98 | 4 |
| Chelsea | 2026–27 | Premier League | 8 | 0 | 0 | 0 | 3 | 0 | — | | — | | 11 | 0 |
| Career total | | | 229 | 8 | 16 | 0 | 9 | 0 | 25 | 3 | 1 | 0 | 280 | 11 |

=== International ===
As of match played 5 October 2026

Appearances and goals by national team and year
| National team | Year | Apps | Goals |
|---|---|---|---|
| France | 2026 | 11 | 0 |
| Total | | 11 | 0 |

== Honours ==
Crystal Palace

- FA Cup: 2024–25
- FA Community Shield: 2025
- UEFA Conference League: 2025–26

Individual

- UEFA Conference League Team of the Season: 2025–26
