= Joél Drakes-Thomas =

English footballer (born 2009)

Personal information
- Full name: Joél Jason Drakes-Thomas
- Date of birth: 9 June 2009 (age 17)
- Place of birth: Wandsworth, England
- Height: 1.80 m (5 ft 11 in)
- Positions: Right winger; attacking midfielder

Team information
- Current team: Crystal Palace
- Number: 86

Youth career
- Lambeth Tigers
- 2015–2025: Crystal Palace

Senior career*
Years	Team	Apps	(Gls)
2025–	Crystal Palace	2	(0)

International career^{‡}
2025	England U16	3	(0)
2025–	England U17	3	(0)
- * Club domestic league appearances and goals as of 4 January 2026 ‡ National team caps and goals as of 3 November 2025

Joél Jason Drakes-Thomas (born 9 June 2009) is an English professional footballer who plays as a right winger or attacking midfielder for Premier League club Crystal Palace.

== Early life ==
Drakes-Thomas was born on 9 June 2009, in Wandsworth, London, England. He is of Jamaican descent through his parents.

== Club career ==
=== Crystal Palace ===
Drakes-Thomas joined the youth academy of Premier League club Crystal Palace in 2015 and progressed through to make his debut for the under-18 team in 2024 at the age of just 15. In 2025, he was promoted to the club's senior team. He made his professional senior debut on 18 December 2025, starting in a 2–2 draw against KuPS in the UEFA Conference League. At 16 years and 192 days, Drakes-Thomas became the youngest Crystal Palace player and the youngest English player to feature in the competition, surpassing Chelsea's Reggie Walsh by two days. He made his Premier League debut two days later, on the 20 December, as an 86th minute substitute replacing Yeremy Pino in a 4–1 defeat to Leeds United.

Drakes-Thomas signed his first professional contract with Palace on 1 July 2026.

== International career ==
Drakes-Thomas is an England youth international. During October and November 2025, he played for the England national under-17 football team in the 2026 UEFA European Under-17 Championship qualification.

== Style of play ==
Drakes-Thomas mainly plays as a right winger, but can operate as an attacking midfielder and has also occasionally played as a right wing-back. Predominantly right-footed, he is known for his pace and direct running.

== Career statistics ==
As of match played 10 January 2026

Appearances and goals by club, season and competition
Club	Season	League			FA Cup		EFL Cup		Europe		Other		Total	
Club	Season	Division	Apps	Goals	Apps	Goals	Apps	Goals	Apps	Goals	Apps	Goals	Apps	Goals
Crystal Palace	2025–26	Premier League	2	0	1	0	0	0	1 (Note: Appearance in UEFA Conference League)	0	0	0	4	0
Career total			2	0	1	0	0	0	1	0	0	0	4	0
