= Dean Benamar =

English footballer (born 2006)

Personal information
- Full name: Dean Benamar
- Date of birth: 31 May 2008 (age 18)
- Place of birth: Westminster, England
- Positions: Left-back; left wing-back

Team information
- Current team: Crystal Palace
- Number: 54

Youth career
- 2021–2025: Crystal Palace

Senior career*
Years	Team	Apps	(Gls)
2025–	Crystal Palace	0	(0)

International career^{‡}
2025–	England U17	7	(1)
2026–	England U18	3	(3)
- * Club domestic league appearances and goals as of 06:57, 13 December 2025 (UTC) ‡ National team caps and goals as of 15:21, 3 June 2026 (UTC)

Dean Benamar (born 31 May 2008) is an English professional footballer who plays as a left-back or left wing-back for Premier League club Crystal Palace.

== Club career ==
=== Crystal Palace ===
Benamar joined the youth academy of Crystal Palace as a U14. On 18 July 2024, he signed a 2-year scholarship contract with Crystal Palace. On 24 July 2025, he signed his first professional contract with the club. On 18 December 2025, he made his senior debut with Crystal Palace in a 2–2 UEFA Conference League tie with the Finnish club KuPS.

== International career ==
Benamar was born in England to an Algerian father and Latvian mother. He was called up to the England U17s for the 2025 UEFA European Under-17 Championship.

Benamar made a goalscoring debut for the England U18s during a 2027 UEFA European Under-19 Championship qualification victory over Croatia on 31 March 2026.

== Career statistics ==
As of match played 18 December 2025

Appearances and goals by club, season and competition
Club	Season	League			Cup		League Cup		Europe		Other		Total	
Club	Season	Division	Apps	Goals	Apps	Goals	Apps	Goals	Apps	Goals	Apps	Goals	Apps	Goals
Crystal Palace	2025–26	Premier League	0	0	0	0	0	0	1 (Note: Appearance in UEFA Conference League)	0	0	0	1	0
Career total			0	0	0	0	0	0	1	0	0	0	1	0
