= Tyrick Mitchell =

English footballer (born 1999)

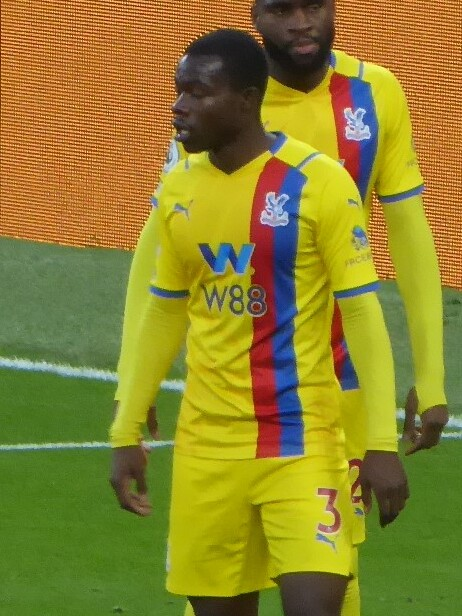
- Mitchell playing for Crystal Palace in 2021

Personal information
- Full name: Tyrick Kwon Mitchell
- Date of birth: 1 September 1999 (age 27)
- Place of birth: Brent, England
- Height: 1.75 m (5 ft 9 in)
- Positions: Left-back; left wing-back

Team information
- Current team: Crystal Palace
- Number: 3

Youth career
- 2009–2012: AFC Wembley
- 2012–2016: Brentford
- 2016–2020: Crystal Palace

Senior career*
Years	Team	Apps	(Gls)
2020–	Crystal Palace	216	(6)

International career
2022	England	2	(0)
- * Club domestic league appearances and goals as of 19:30, 31 October 2026 (UTC)

Tyrick Kwon Mitchell (born 1 September 1999) is an English professional footballer who plays as a left-back or left wing-back for Premier League club Crystal Palace.

A Crystal Palace academy graduate, Mitchell made his first-team debut in 2020, and has since made over 180 appearances for the club, as well as winning the FA Cup in 2025. He made his debut for the England national team in 2022.

== Early life ==
Mitchell was born in Brent, London and raised nearby in Harrow, attending Hatch End High School. He began playing for grassroots team Pinner Albion and trialled with Watford aged nine. His father spent the majority of his childhood in prison and his mother was reliant on benefits to support their family, meaning Mitchell struggled with attendance. He subsequently joined AFC Wembley where coach Abdi Farah became his mentor and, later, his agent. Mitchell described Farah as a "role model" who would take him to and from training sessions. He eventually impressed Brentford scouts in a friendly match against the academy side.

== Club career ==
=== Brentford ===
In 2012, Mitchell joined the Brentford Academy. He was part of the under-15 team that won the Junior Globe at the 2014 Milk Cup and later offered a scholarship with the Championship club. However, the academy was shut down due to financial decisions in May 2016 and Mitchell pursued alternative options. He had a preference to remain in London to support his family.

=== Crystal Palace ===
In July 2016, Mitchell joined Premier League club Crystal Palace. After a season with the development squad, he was awarded a two-year scholarship and featured for both the under-18 and under-23 Professional Development League winning teams. In 2018, he became a regular starter for the under-23s and was rewarded with a new contract in January 2019.

==== 2019–20 season ====
In 2019, Mitchell joined the first team on their pre-season tour and sustained a thigh injury that kept him out for five months. He returned to the first team squad as an unused substitute in a 1–1 draw with Brighton & Hove Albion on 16 December. Further issues with the injury meant he was named as an unused substitute just once more before the 2019–20 season was postponed due to the COVID-19 pandemic.

After the league's resumption in June 2020, Mitchell was named in all nine matchday squads. On 4 July, he made his professional debut as a late substitute for Patrick van Aanholt in a 3–0 defeat to Leicester City. He made his home debut with another appearance from the bench in a 2–0 defeat to Manchester United on 16 July, and started in the final two league fixtures against Wolverhampton Wanderers and Tottenham Hotspur.

==== 2020–21 season ====
Mitchell became a regular inclusion in first team manager Roy Hodgson's matchday squads during the 2020–21 season, enjoying three runs in the team as the starting left-back. He started in the first six league matches before suffering an injury, and featured another seven times between December and February. In April 2021, Mitchell signed a new four-year contract after attracting interest from Arsenal. He returned to the starting left-back role in May for the final six games of the season. On 16 May, he scored his first goal and recorded his first assist in a 3–2 victory against Aston Villa.

==== 2022–23 season ====
On 6 May 2023, Mitchell made his 100th Appearance for Crystal Palace in all competitions, featuring in a 1–0 away loss to Tottenham Hotspur. At the end of the 2022–23 season, he received the PFA Community Champion Award for his support for the Palace for Life Foundation, most notably for his work with their flagship employability and training programme GAME ON.

==== 2023–24 season ====
On 4 November 2023, Mitchell scored a stoppage-time goal in a 2–0 win over Burnley, his second goal for Crystal Palace.

==== 2024–25 season ====
Mitchell missed just three games for the Crystal Palace side throughout the 2024–25 season.

On 17 May 2025, Mitchell played every minute as Crystal Palace beat Manchester City 1–0 in the 2025 FA Cup final for Crystal Palace's first major trophy. During the match, City were awarded a penalty when Mitchell fouled Bernardo Silva in the box; however, the resulting penalty by Omar Marmoush was saved by Palace goalkeeper Dean Henderson.

== International career ==
Born in England, Mitchell is of Jamaican descent and expressed an interest in representing the Jamaica national team. He received his first senior England call up on 21 March 2022, following withdrawals by Trent Alexander-Arnold and Reece James.

He made his senior debut under manager Gareth Southgate in a 2–1 win over Switzerland on 26 March 2022, as a 61st-minute like-for-like substitute for Luke Shaw.

== Career statistics ==
=== Club ===
As of match played 31 October 2026

Appearances and goals by club, season and competition
Club	Season	League			FA Cup		EFL Cup		Europe		Other		Total	
Club	Season	Division	Apps	Goals	Apps	Goals	Apps	Goals	Apps	Goals	Apps	Goals	Apps	Goals
Crystal Palace	2019–20	Premier League	4	0	0	0	0	0	—		—		4	0
Crystal Palace	2020–21	Premier League	19	1	1	0	0	0	—		—		20	1
Crystal Palace	2021–22	Premier League	36	0	4	0	1	0	—		—		41	0
Crystal Palace	2022–23	Premier League	36	0	0	0	2	0	—		—		38	0
Crystal Palace	2023–24	Premier League	37	2	2	0	2	0	—		—		41	2
Crystal Palace	2024–25	Premier League	37	0	4	0	4	0	—		—		45	0
Crystal Palace	2025–26	Premier League	38	1	1	0	1	0	14 (Note: Appearances in UEFA Conference League)	2	1 (Note: Appearance in FA Community Shield)	0	55	3
Crystal Palace	2026–27	Premier League	9	2	0	0	1	0	3 (Note: Appearances in UEFA Europa League)	0	—		13	2
Career total			216	6	12	0	11	0	17	2	1	0	257	8

=== International ===
Appearances and goals by national team and year
National team	Year	Apps	Goals
England	2022	2	0
Total		2	0

== Honours ==
Crystal Palace

- FA Cup: 2024–25
- FA Community Shield: 2025
- UEFA Conference League: 2025–26

Individual

- PFA Community Champion Award: 2022–23
