= 2025 FA Community Shield =

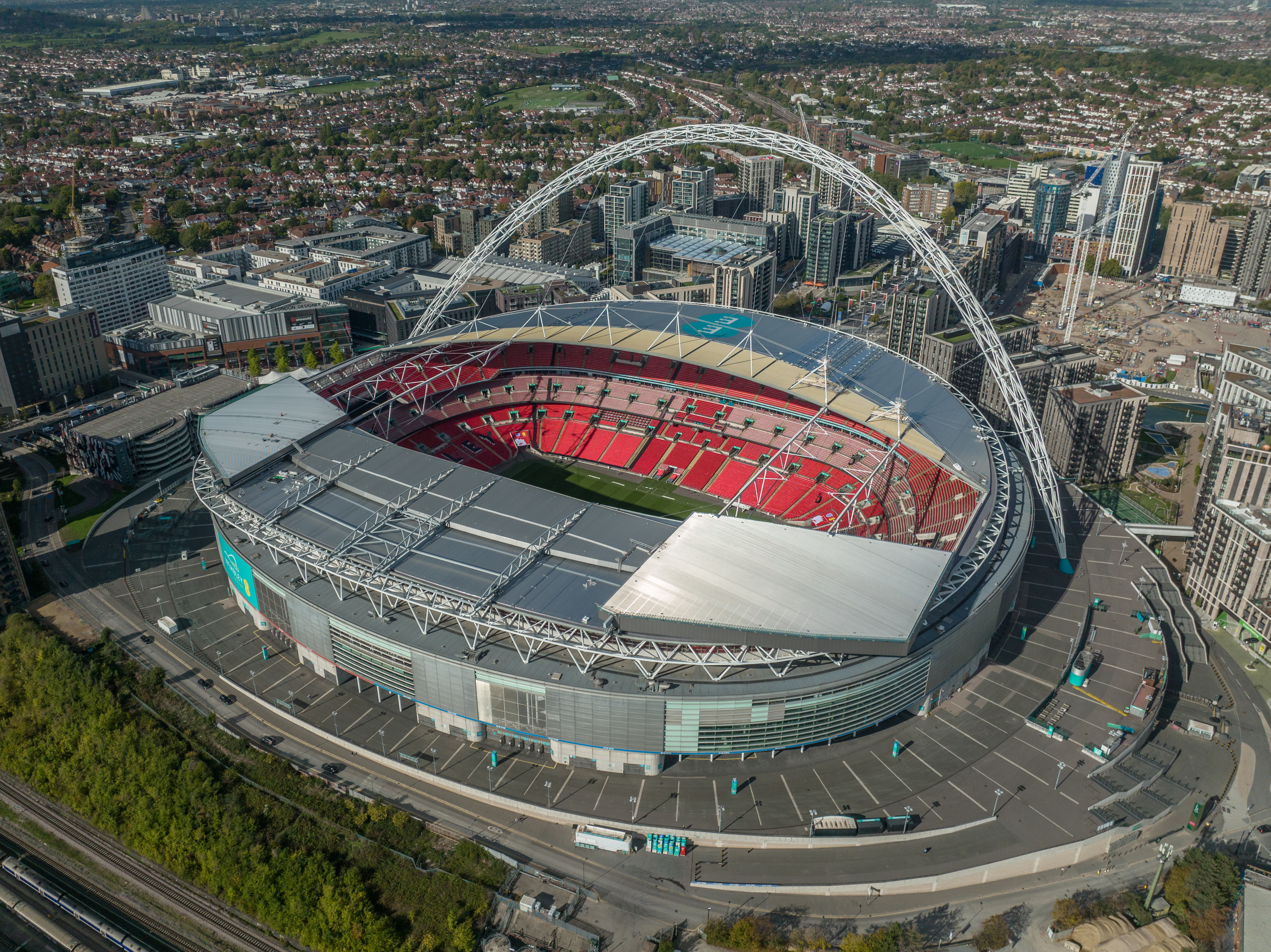
- The match took place at Wembley Stadium
Crystal Palace	Liverpool
2	2
- Crystal Palace won 3–2 on penalties
- Date: 10 August 2025
- Venue: Wembley Stadium, London
- Man of the Match: Ismaïla Sarr (Crystal Palace)
- Referee: Chris Kavanagh (Manchester)
- Attendance: 82,645

The 2025 FA Community Shield was the 103rd FA Community Shield, an annual association football match contested by the winners of the previous season's Premier League and FA Cup competitions. It was played at Wembley Stadium in London on 10 August 2025, and featured the 2024–25 Premier League winners Liverpool and the 2024–25 FA Cup winners Crystal Palace.

Crystal Palace beat Liverpool 3–2 on penalties after a 2–2 draw on normal time, winning their first Community Shield title.

Manchester City were the holders, having won the 2024 edition, but they did not qualify for this match, being defeated in the FA Cup final and having finished third in the league.

== Background ==
Liverpool and Crystal Palace qualified for the 2025 FA Community Shield as the winners of the 2024–25 Premier League and the 2024–25 FA Cup, respectively. It was the 67th meeting between the two sides, and the first appearance for Crystal Palace in a Community Shield match, after they earned their first ever major trophy in winning the FA Cup. Liverpool have previously appeared in 24 Community Shield matches, winning 16 titles (sharing five of which), and appearing most recently in the 2022 edition, where they beat Manchester City 3–1 at the King Power Stadium.

== Match ==
=== Summary ===
Liverpool took an early lead in the 4th minute when Hugo Ekitike scored with a low shot into the right corner. Crystal Palace equalised in the 17th minute through a Jean-Philippe Mateta penalty into the right of the net, awarded after a foul in the box by Virgil van Dijk on Ismaïla Sarr. Jeremie Frimpong restored Liverpool's advantage in the 21st minute with a cross-shot from the right that looped into the net after hitting the far post. Crystal Palace levelled again in the 77th minute when Ismaïla Sarr converted from the right, in-off the post, after an incisive through-ball.

With the score tied 2–2 at full time, the match went to a penalty shoot-out. Crystal Palace goalkeeper Dean Henderson saved from Alexis Mac Allister and Harvey Elliott, after Mohamed Salah had missed the target with a shot over the bar. Justin Devenny converted the winning penalty to the right of the net as Crystal Palace triumphed 3–2 in the shoot-out, securing their first-ever Community Shield title in their inaugural appearance in the fixture.

=== Details ===
10 August 2025
15:00 BST

Crystal Palace	2–2	Liverpool
Mateta 17' (pen.); Sarr 77'	Report	Ekitike 4'; Frimpong 21'
Penalties
Mateta (penalty scored); Eze (penalty missed); Sarr (penalty scored); Sosa (penalty missed); Devenny (penalty scored)	3–2	(penalty missed) Salah; (penalty missed) Mac Allister; (penalty scored) Gakpo; (penalty missed) Elliott; (penalty scored) Szoboszlai

Wembley Stadium, London
Attendance: 82,645
Referee: Chris Kavanagh (Manchester)

Crystal Palace	Liverpool

GK	1	(England) Dean Henderson
CB	26	(United States) Chris Richards
CB	5	(France) Maxence Lacroix
CB	6	(England) Marc Guéhi (c)	(substituted off) 90+4'
RM	2	(Colombia) Daniel Muñoz
CM	20	(England) Adam Wharton	(substituted off) 85'
CM	18	(Japan) Daichi Kamada	(substituted off) 29'
LM	3	(England) Tyrick Mitchell	(substituted off) 79'
RW	7	(Senegal) Ismaïla Sarr
LW	10	(England) Eberechi Eze
CF	14	(France) Jean-Philippe Mateta
Substitutes:
GK	44	(Argentina) Walter Benítez
DF	17	(England) Nathaniel Clyne
DF	24	(Croatia) Borna Sosa	(substituted on) 79'
DF	59	(Trinidad and Tobago) Rio Cardines
MF	8	(Colombia) Jefferson Lerma	(substituted on) 85'
MF	19	(England) Will Hughes	(substituted on) 29'
MF	55	(Northern Ireland) Justin Devenny	(substituted on) 90+4'
FW	21	(England) Romain Esse
FW	22	(France) Odsonne Édouard
Manager:
(Austria) Oliver Glasner

GK	1	(Brazil) Alisson
RB	30	(Netherlands) Jeremie Frimpong
CB	5	(France) Ibrahima Konaté	(yellow card) 43'
CB	4	(Netherlands) Virgil van Dijk (c)
LB	6	(Hungary) Milos Kerkez		(substituted off) 84'
CM	17	(England) Curtis Jones		(substituted off) 71'
CM	8	(Hungary) Dominik Szoboszlai
RW	11	(Egypt) Mohamed Salah	(yellow card) 87'
AM	7	(Germany) Florian Wirtz	(yellow card) 44'	(substituted off) 84'
LW	18	(Netherlands) Cody Gakpo
CF	22	(France) Hugo Ekitike		(substituted off) 71'
Substitutes:
GK	25	(Georgia (country)) Giorgi Mamardashvili
DF	26	(Scotland) Andy Robertson		(substituted on) 84'
MF	3	(Japan) Wataru Endō		(substituted on) 71'
MF	10	(Argentina) Alexis Mac Allister		(substituted on) 71'
MF	19	(England) Harvey Elliott		(substituted on) 84'
MF	42	(England) Trey Nyoni
FW	14	(Italy) Federico Chiesa
FW	50	(Scotland) Ben Doak
FW	73	(England) Rio Ngumoha
Manager:
(Netherlands) Arne Slot

Man of the Match:
Ismaïla Sarr (Crystal Palace)

Assistant referees:
James Mainwaring (Lancashire)
Wade Smith (Manchester)
Fourth official:
Tony Harrington (Durham)
Reserve assistant referee:
Akil Howson (Leicestershire and Rutland)
Video assistant referee:
Paul Tierney (Lancashire)
Assistant video assistant referee:
Nick Hopton (Derbyshire)

Match rules

- 90 minutes
- Penalty shoot-out if scores level
- Nine named substitutes, of which six may be used
