= George King (footballer, born 2007) =

Irish footballer (born 2007)

Personal information
- Full name: George Callum Michael King
- Date of birth: 20 March 2007 (age 19)
- Place of birth: Croydon, England
- Position: Centre-back

Team information
- Current team: Crystal Palace
- Number: 37

Youth career
- 2019–2025: Crystal Palace

Senior career*
Years	Team	Apps	(Gls)
2025–	Crystal Palace	0	(0)

International career
2022	England U16	2	(0)
2025	Republic of Ireland U19	1	(0)
- * Club domestic league appearances and goals as of 16 December 2025 (UTC)

George Callum Michael King (born 20 March 2007) is an Irish professional footballer who plays as a centre-back for Premier League club Crystal Palace. He is a Republic of Ireland U19 youth international.

== Club career ==
=== Crystal Palace ===
King joined the Crystal Palace academy at under-12 level and progressed through the academy ranks consistently playing above his age group. He is a ball-playing central defender whose versatility has also seen him as a midfielder. King captained the Palace under-18 team, and broke into the under-21 side at the end of the 2024–25 season. He signed his first professional contract with the club in March 2025. King trained with the Crystal Palace first-team in the summer of 2025, playing in a pre-season match before injury affected the start of his season. He trained with the first-team again in December 2025. King was named as a starter for his professional debut on 18 December 2025, a 2–2 draw against Finnish club KuPS in the UEFA Conference League.

== International career ==
King played age-group football for England prior to his call-up by the Republic of Ireland national under-19 football team, making his debut at that level in October 2025.

== Career statistics ==
As of match played 18 December 2025

Appearances and goals by club, season and competition
Club	Season	League			FA Cup		EFL Cup		Europe		Other		Total	
Club	Season	Division	Apps	Goals	Apps	Goals	Apps	Goals	Apps	Goals	Apps	Goals	Apps	Goals
Crystal Palace	2025–26	Premier League	0	0	0	0	0	0	1 (Note: Appearance in UEFA Conference League)	0	0	0	1	0
Career total			0	0	0	0	0	0	1	0	0	0	1	0
