= Justin Devenny =

Northern Irish footballer (born 2003)

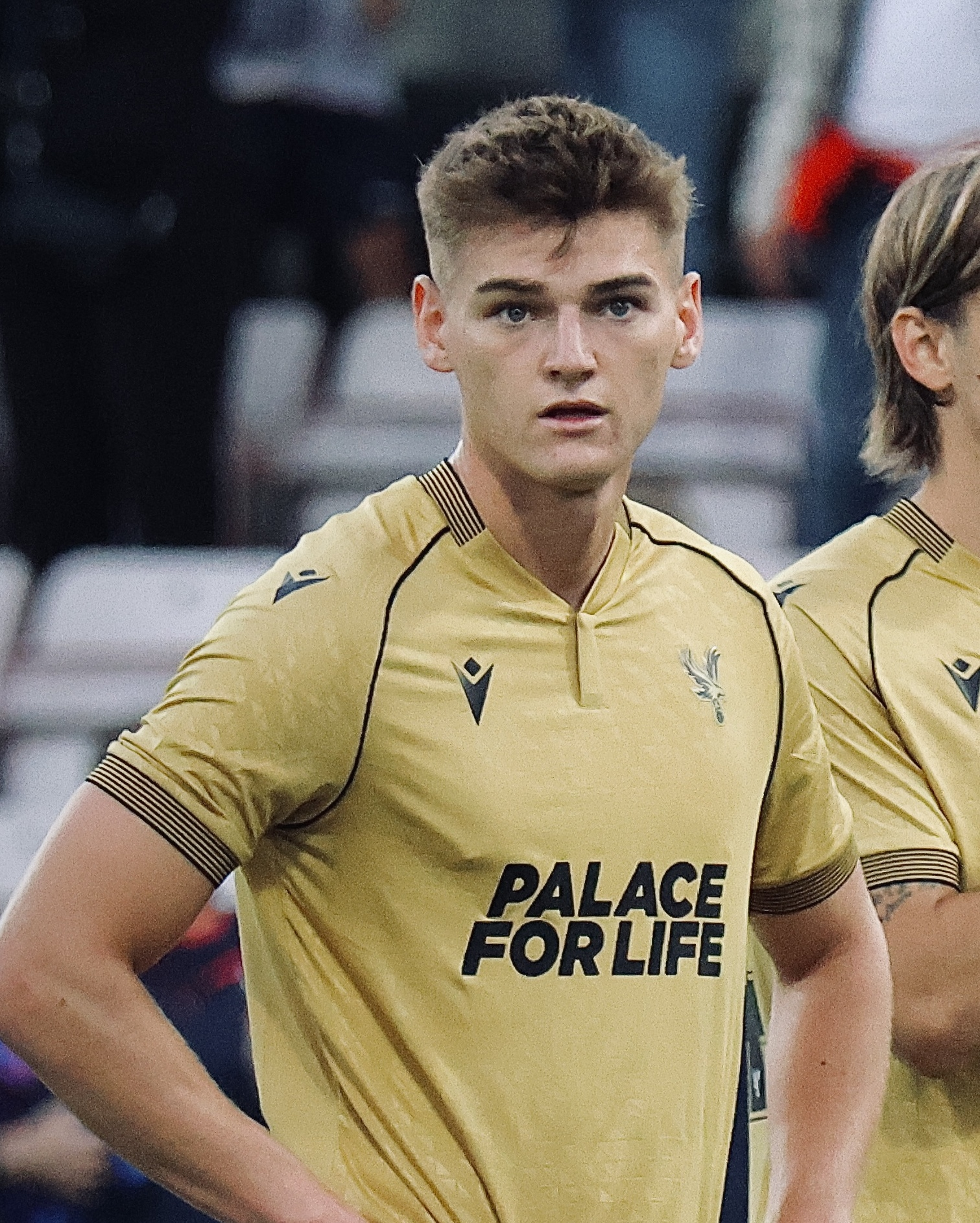
- Devenny in 2025

Personal information
- Full name: Justin Devenny
- Date of birth: 11 October 2003 (age 23)
- Place of birth: Irvine, Scotland
- Height: 1.78 m (5 ft 10 in)
- Positions: Central midfielder; attacking midfielder; wing-back

Team information
- Current team: Stoke City
- Number: 13

Youth career
- Kilmarnock

Senior career*
Years	Team	Apps	(Gls)
2021–2022	Kilmarnock	0	(0)
2022	→ Broomhill (loan)	15	(3)
2022	→ Airdrieonians (loan)	9	(0)
2022–2023	Airdrieonians	33	(1)
2023–2026	Crystal Palace	44	(2)
2026–	Stoke City	12	(2)

International career^{‡}
2023–2024	Northern Ireland U21	8	(1)
2024–	Northern Ireland	20	(2)
- * Club domestic league appearances and goals as of 20:34, 21 November 2026 (UTC) ‡ National team caps and goals as of 18 November 2026

Justin Devenny (born 11 October 2003) is a professional footballer who plays as a central midfielder, attacking midfielder or wing-back for EFL Championship club Stoke City. Born in Scotland, he plays for the Northern Ireland national team.

An academy graduate of Kilmarnock, Devenny had spells in the lower leagues in Scotland with Broomhill and Airdrieonians before signing for the academy of Crystal Palace in 2023. He made his Premier League debut in 2024, going on to win the FA Cup and Community Shield in 2025 (scoring the decisive penalty in the latter) and the UEFA Conference League in 2026.

== Club career ==
=== Early career ===
Devenny was born in Irvine, North Ayrshire and attended the Grange Academy in Kilmarnock where he was also a graduate of the Scottish FA performance schools programme and represented the Ayrshire Schools FA regional team. He came through the youth system at Kilmarnock. During the 2021–22 season, he was loaned out to Broomhill in the Lowland Football League. He joined Airdrieonians initially on loan in February 2022 and made the move permanent that summer. Devenny helped Airdrie gain promotion to the Scottish Championship via the play-offs, and scored his first senior goal in the Scottish League Cup win over Cowdenbeath. He also scored in the play-off semi-final win against Falkirk and converted a decisive penalty in the shoot-out win for Airdrie in the play-off final in May 2023 against Hamilton Academical.

=== Crystal Palace ===
Devenny joined Premier League club Crystal Palace in August 2023, to start off in their under-21 development team. He made his Premier League debut on 9 November 2024, starting in Palace's 2–0 home loss against Fulham. On his second start for the first team on 23 November, Devenny scored his first senior goal for Palace in a 2–2 draw against Aston Villa. He scored in a 2–0 win over Doncaster Rovers on 10 February 2025 in the fourth round of Palace's FA Cup-winning campaign, and was later an unused substitute as Palace won the final on 17 May.

On 10 August 2025, following a 2–2 draw against Liverpool in the 2025 FA Community Shield, Devenny scored Palace's decisive fifth penalty in the ensuing shootout, winning his second trophy with the club; he had previously come inches away from scoring the game-winning goal in stoppage time. Devenny scored his first European goal on 18 December 2025, in a 2–2 draw against Finnish club KuPS in the UEFA Conference League.

=== Stoke City ===
On 2 September 2026, Devenny joined EFL Championship club Stoke City, signing a four-year contract for an undisclosed fee. He scored twice on his debut three days later in a 4–0 win over Charlton Athletic.

== International career ==
Despite being born in Scotland, Devenny qualifies for the Northern Ireland national team through his mother. He became a regular member of the Northern Ireland U21 team after making his debut in October 2023. In October 2024, he scored his first goal for Northern Ireland U21 in a 5-0 win against Azerbaijan U21.

On 11 November 2024, Devenny was called up to the senior squad for the first time for their Nations League matches against Belarus and Luxembourg. He made his senior debut on 18 November 2024, in a 2–2 draw against Luxembourg. On 4 September 2025, Devenny scored his first senior international goal in a 3-1 away win against Luxembourg in a qualification match for the 2026 FIFA World Cup.

The following season, he scored a late equaliser to help Northern Ireland gain promotion from the 2026–27 UEFA Nations League B following a 1-1 away draw against Hungary on 17 November 2026.

== Career statistics ==
=== Club ===
As of match played 21 November 2026

Appearances and goals by club, season and competition
Club	Season	League			National cup (Note: Includes FA Cup)		League cup (Note: Includes Scottish League Cup, EFL Cup)		Europe		Other		Total	
Club	Season	Division	Apps	Goals	Apps	Goals	Apps	Goals	Apps	Goals	Apps	Goals	Apps	Goals
Kilmarnock	2021–22	Scottish Championship	0	0	0	0	0	0	—		0	0	0	0
Broomhill (loan)	2021–22	Lowland Football League	15	3	0	0	0	0	—		0	0	15	3
Airdrieonians (loan)	2021–22	Scottish League One	9	0	0	0	0	0	—		0	0	9	0
Airdrieonians	2022–23	Scottish League One	33	1	0	0	6	3	—		6 (Note: Appearances in Scottish League One promotion play-offs)	1	45	5
Airdrieonians	Total		42	1	0	0	6	3	—		6	1	54	5
Crystal Palace U21	2023–24	—			—		—		—		3 (Note: Appearance(s) in EFL Trophy)	0	3	0
Crystal Palace U21	2024–25	—			—		—		—		2	0	2	0
Crystal Palace U21	Total		—		—		—		—		5	0	5	0
Crystal Palace	2023–24	Premier League	0	0	0	0	0	0	—		—		0	0
Crystal Palace	2024–25	Premier League	23	1	4	1	1	0	—		—		28	2
Crystal Palace	2025–26	Premier League	21	1	1	0	3	0	6 (Note: Appearances in UEFA Conference League)	1	1 (Note: Appearance in FA Community Shield)	0	32	2
Crystal Palace	Total		44	2	5	1	4	0	6	1	1	0	60	4
Stoke City	2026–27	EFL Championship	12	2	0	0	—		—		—		12	2
Career total			113	8	5	1	10	3	6	1	12	1	141	14

=== International ===
As of match played 17 November 2026

Appearances and goals by national team and year
National team	Year	Apps	Goals
Northern Ireland	2024	1	0
Northern Ireland	2025	9	1
Northern Ireland	2026	10	1
Total		20	2

List of international goals scored by Justin Devenny
No.	Date	Venue	Opponent	Score	Result	Competition
1	4 September 2025	Stade de Luxembourg, Luxembourg City, Luxembourg	Luxembourg	3–1	3–1	2026 FIFA World Cup qualification
2	17 November 2026	Puskas Arena, Budapest, Hungary	Hungary	1–1	1–1	2026–27 UEFA Nations League B

== Honours ==
Crystal Palace

- FA Cup: 2024–25
- FA Community Shield: 2025
- UEFA Conference League: 2025–26
