= 2025 FA Cup final =

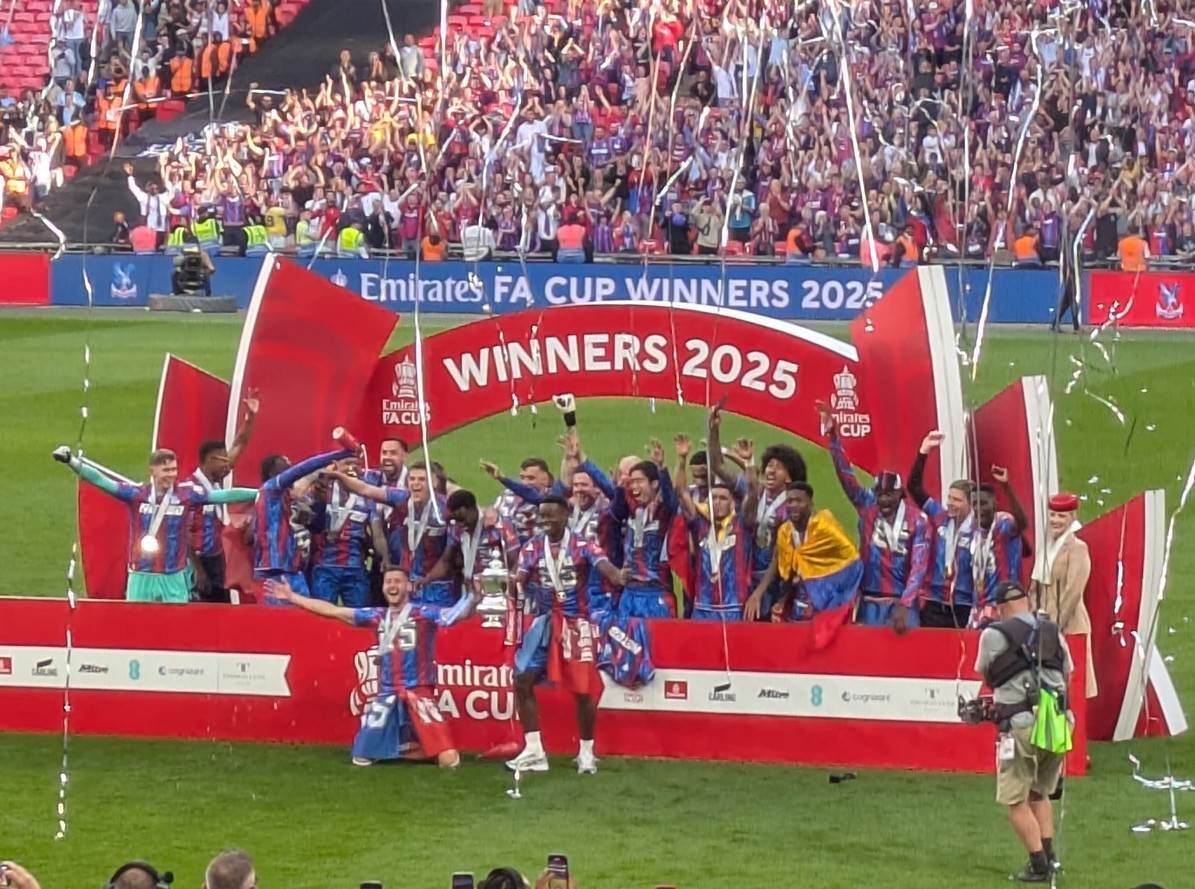
- Crystal Palace lifting the trophy
- Event: 2024–25 FA Cup
| Crystal Palace | Manchester City |
| 1 | 0 |
- Date: 17 May 2025
- Venue: Wembley Stadium, London
- Player of the Match: Daniel Muñoz (Crystal Palace)
- Referee: Stuart Attwell (Birmingham)
- Attendance: 84,163
- Weather: Sunny

The 2025 FA Cup final was a football match played at Wembley Stadium in London, England, on 17 May 2025 between Crystal Palace and Manchester City that determined the winners of the 2024–25 FA Cup. It was the 144th final of English football's primary cup competition, the Football Association Challenge Cup.

Crystal Palace won the match 1–0 after a first-half goal from winger Eberechi Eze and a penalty save by goalkeeper Dean Henderson, resulting in the club winning their first-ever major trophy, excluding defunct competitions (having previously won the 1990–91 Full Members' Cup). As winners, they earned the right to play against Liverpool, the winners of the 2024–25 Premier League, in the 2025 FA Community Shield. They would have earned a spot in the league phase of the 2025–26 UEFA Europa League which is given to the FA Cup winners, but lost the right due to a successful appeal by Olympique Lyonnais, who had an equivalent major qualification win but also shared an owner with Palace, which brought UEFA's multi-club ownership rules into play, allowing an owner only one entry in a tournament; Olympique had a higher domestic league position in the same season, and was thus granted the entry. Nevertheless, Palace were instead given a berth to play in the play-off round of the 2025–26 UEFA Conference League. It also meant that Crystal Palace qualified for a major European competition for the first time in club history This decision was appealed by Crystal Palace but was unsuccessful.

For Manchester City, this was their third consecutive FA Cup final, and second defeat in a row, becoming the tenth team to lose consecutive finals.

== Route to the final ==
=== Crystal Palace ===
Crystal Palace's route to the final
| Round | Opposition | Score |
|---|---|---|
| 3rd | Stockport County (H) | 1–0 |
| 4th | Doncaster Rovers (A) | 2–0 |
| 5th | Millwall (H) | 3–1 |
| QF | Fulham (A) | 3–0 |
| SF | Aston Villa (N) | 3–0 |
Key: (H) = Home venue; (A) = Away venue; (N) = Neutral venue

As a Premier League team, Crystal Palace entered the tournament in the third round. They began their FA Cup journey with a narrow 1–0 home win over Stockport County; the lone goal scored by Eberechi Eze. Palace then defeated League Two side Doncaster Rovers 2–0, with goals coming from Daniel Muñoz and Justin Devenny. In the fifth round against fellow rivals Millwall in the south-east London derby, Crystal Palace striker Jean-Philippe Mateta was stretchered off just nine minutes into the match following a collision with Millwall goalkeeper Liam Roberts, who was shown a straight red card for striking Mateta in the head with his boot—a challenge that left Mateta needing 25 stitches. With Millwall reduced to ten men, Palace quickly took control, earning a 3–1 victory through a Japhet Tanganga own goal, followed by goals from Daniel Muñoz and Eddie Nketiah.

In the quarter-finals, Crystal Palace were drawn against fellow Premier League club Fulham. Despite being away at Craven Cottage, Palace comfortably dispatched the south-west London side 3–0, with Eberechi Eze, Ismaïla Sarr, and Eddie Nketiah all getting their names on the scoresheet. In the semi-finals against Aston Villa at Wembley, Crystal Palace secured a 3–0 victory courtesy of a goal from Eberechi Eze followed by an Ismaïla Sarr brace. This victory sent Palace through to their third FA Cup final, and their first since 2016, when they were defeated 2–1 by Manchester United, with Joel Ward the only remaining player from that side.

=== Manchester City ===
Manchester City's route to the final
| Round | Opposition | Score |
|---|---|---|
| 3rd | Salford City (H) | 8–0 |
| 4th | Leyton Orient (A) | 2–1 |
| 5th | Plymouth Argyle (H) | 3–1 |
| QF | Bournemouth (A) | 2–1 |
| SF | Nottingham Forest (N) | 2–0 |
Key: (H) = Home venue; (A) = Away venue; (N) = Neutral venue

As a Premier League team, Manchester City entered the tournament in the third round. City began their FA Cup campaign with a commanding 8–0 victory at home against League Two side Salford City. The majority of the goals came from James McAtee, who scored a second-half hat-trick, and Jérémy Doku, who scored a brace, with Divin Mubama, Jack Grealish, and Nico O'Reilly also contributing to the scoring. This was their biggest win since defeating Watford by the same score in 2019. City survived an early scare against Leyton Orient in the fourth round, with goals from Abdukodir Khusanov and Kevin de Bruyne required to nullify a Stefan Ortega own goal. In the fifth round, City defeated Plymouth Argyle 3–1 despite an opener from Plymouth's Maksym Talovierov due to two goals by Nico O'Reilly, and a goal and an assist from Kevin de Bruyne.

In the quarter-finals, Manchester City were drawn against fellow Premier League team Bournemouth, facing them away from home at Dean Court. Evanilson gave Bournemouth a first-half lead, but for the third match in a row, City mounted a comeback, with second-half goals from strikers Erling Haaland and Omar Marmoush securing the victory. In the semi-finals at Wembley, City defeated Nottingham Forest 2–0 by virtue of goals from Rico Lewis and Joško Gvardiol. This marked the first time Manchester City featured in three consecutive FA Cup finals, having previously played in the 2023 and 2024 finals respectively.

== Pre-match ==
The pre-match show featured DJ Tony Perry, supported by the Massed Bands of His Majesty's Royal Marines. "Abide with Me", the traditional pre-match cup final hymn, was sung by Sinead Ashiokai, while Siena MBC performed the national anthem "God Save the King".

== Match ==
=== Summary ===
Pep Guardiola named a strong attacking lineup for City, and early on, they dominated proceedings. Erling Haaland had the first clear-cut chance in the 6th minute when he met a deep cross at the far post, but Palace keeper Dean Henderson blocked it out for a corner. City continued to dominate and had several corners as both Gvardiol and Akanji had headers saved by Henderson. However against the run of play Crystal Palace hit City on the counterattack, after a clearance upfield by defender Chris Richards met Jean-Philippe Mateta who, in a neat one two with Daichi Kamada then released Daniel Muñoz to race up the wing and cross in from the right for Eberechi Eze to first-time volley and score in the 16th minute. Munoz nearly provided a second goal for Palace just three minutes later in another run up the wing in a near identical move, only for Ismaïla Sarr's shot to be blocked by the legs of City keeper Ortega.

In the 23rd minute, a moment of controversy came in the game when City's Erling Haaland and Palace goalkeeper Dean Henderson challenged for a long ball by City's Joško Gvardiol, with Henderson palming the ball away when it was outside the penalty box. Despite Henderson's legs being inside the penalty box; the video assistant referee reviewed the incident and declined to recommend a red card for Henderson. However, in the 36th minute City were awarded a penalty after Palace's Tyrick Mitchell was judged to have fouled City's Bernardo Silva, who had already started to fall when Mitchell performed a sliding challenge; however Henderson blocked the resultant penalty by Omar Marmoush down to his right, who also saved Haaland's follow-up shot. Doku had a shot saved by Henderson in the 42nd minute and captain Marc Guéhi cleared the parried shot before City could head it in, but at half time Palace led 1–0.

In the second half, City had a chance from the restart when a deep cross was cleared from the back post by Palace defender Chris Richards, preventing a certain Haaland headed goal. Palace then started to threaten the Manchester City goal and had several good chances to double their advantage. A deep throw by Richards in the box in the 49th minute saw Eze's goal-bound shot hit his captain, Marc Guehi, in a packed box, with the resulting injury to Guehi's eye later forcing his substitution ten minutes later. City's Bernardo Silva had a good chance blocked by Palace in the 55th minute, but just three minutes later, Palace thought they had scored. Chris Richards' deep throw-in led to confusion in the box, and the resulting ricochet saw Muñoz react quickest to score before Ortega could react to go 2–0 up. However, on checking with VAR, it was later ruled out due to an offside call on Ismaïla Sarr. Daichi Kamada then had a chance in the 67th minute after a Palace corner was poorly cleared by City and fell to Kamada outside the box, whose shot whipped just over the bar.

As time ticked on, City tried to push for an equaliser as Palace suffered another injury to one of their players. In the 71st minute Kevin De Bruyne's shot outside the box pole axed Palace midfielder Adam Wharton as he blocked the shot. Wharton persevered in the match but was later replaced by Will Hughes in the 86th minute, Hughes having been a losing finalist to Manchester City when at Watford F.C. in the 2019 Final. Nico O'Reilly then had a golden chance for City to score in the 74th minute when he found himself clear on goal in the box, but he took too long to think about his shot, and Palace were able to smother him with their defenders to clear the ball away.

A number of substitutions came with 15 minutes left of normal time. Palace striker Mateta was substituted for Eddie Nketiah, a former FA Cup winner for Arsenal in 2020, while City brought on Phil Foden and Claudio Echeverri for Silva and Marmoush as Pep Guardiola looked to change things. Echeverri was a surprise inclusion in the squad, but within five minutes of coming on he had a great chance to score when his shot was saved by Henderson in the 81st minute. Munoz then had a shot whip across goal in the 86th minute for Palace before Pep then brought on İlkay Gündoğan for Silva as City went for broke.

There were ten minutes of injury time in the game, during which De Bruyne had a shot at goal in the 92nd minute as City tried to force an equaliser to take the game into extra time. In the 95th minute, Echeverri had two golden chances to score, the first being saved by Palace keeper Henderson, and his second blocked by Palace defenders to prevent a certain goal. Palace then held out fairly comfortably in the final five minutes before the referee finally blew his whistle to end the game and give Crystal Palace their first ever FA Cup at the third time of asking. As Palace went up to collect the Cup unused substitute Joel Ward, who was the last surviving Palace player from the 2016 FA Cup Final and was leaving at the end of the season after 13 years, was given the honour to lift the Cup with captain Marc Guehi.

=== Details ===
17 May 2025
16:30 BST

| Crystal Palace | 1–0 | Manchester City |
|---|---|---|
| Eze 16' | Report | Marmoush (penalty missed) 37 |

Wembley Stadium, London
Attendance: 84,163
Referee: Stuart Attwell (Birmingham)

| Crystal Palace | Manchester City |

| GK | 1 | (England) Dean Henderson | (yellow card) 90+1' |
| CB | 26 | (United States) Chris Richards |
| CB | 5 | (France) Maxence Lacroix |
| CB | 6 | (England) Marc Guéhi (c) | | (substituted off) 61' |
| RM | 12 | (Colombia) Daniel Muñoz |
| CM | 20 | (England) Adam Wharton | | (substituted off) 87' |
| CM | 18 | (Japan) Daichi Kamada |
| LM | 3 | (England) Tyrick Mitchell |
| RW | 7 | (Senegal) Ismaïla Sarr |
| LW | 10 | (England) Eberechi Eze |
| CF | 14 | (France) Jean-Philippe Mateta | | (substituted off) 78' |
Substitutes:
| GK | 30 | (United States) Matt Turner |
| DF | 2 | (England) Joel Ward |
| DF | 17 | (England) Nathaniel Clyne |
| DF | 25 | (England) Ben Chilwell |
| MF | 8 | (Colombia) Jefferson Lerma | | (substituted on) 61' |
| MF | 19 | (England) Will Hughes | | (substituted on) 87' |
| MF | 55 | (Northern Ireland) Justin Devenny |
| FW | 9 | (England) Eddie Nketiah | | (substituted on) 78' |
| FW | 21 | (England) Romain Esse |
Manager:
(Austria) Oliver Glasner

| GK | 18 | (Germany) Stefan Ortega |
| RB | 25 | (Switzerland) Manuel Akanji |
| CB | 3 | (Portugal) Rúben Dias | (yellow card) 82' |
| CB | 24 | (Croatia) Joško Gvardiol |
| LB | 75 | (England) Nico O'Reilly | (yellow card) 66' |
| CM | 20 | (Portugal) Bernardo Silva | (yellow card) 75' | (substituted off) 88' |
| CM | 17 | (Belgium) Kevin De Bruyne (c) | (yellow card) 85' |
| RW | 26 | (Brazil) Savinho | | (substituted off) 76' |
| AM | 7 | (Egypt) Omar Marmoush | | (substituted off) 76' |
| LW | 11 | (Belgium) Jérémy Doku |
| CF | 9 | (Norway) Erling Haaland |
Substitutes:
| GK | 31 | (Brazil) Ederson |
| DF | 22 | (Brazil) Vitor Reis |
| DF | 45 | (Uzbekistan) Abdukodir Khusanov |
| MF | 10 | (England) Jack Grealish |
| MF | 14 | (Spain) Nico González |
| MF | 19 | (Germany) İlkay Gündoğan | | (substituted on) 88' |
| MF | 27 | (Portugal) Matheus Nunes |
| MF | 30 | (Argentina) Claudio Echeverri | (yellow card) 90+4' | (substituted on) 76' |
| MF | 47 | (England) Phil Foden | | (substituted on) 76' |
Manager:
(Spain) Pep Guardiola

Player of the Match:
Daniel Muñoz (Crystal Palace)

Assistant referees:
Adam Nunn (Wiltshire)
Dan Robathan (Norfolk)
Fourth official:
Darren England (Sheffield & Hallamshire)
Reserve assistant referee:
Craig Taylor (Staffordshire)
Video assistant referee:
Jarred Gillett (Liverpool)
Assistant video assistant referee:
Michael Salisbury (Lancashire)
Support video assistant referee:
Darren Cann (Norfolk)

Match rules

- 90 minutes
- 30 minutes of extra time if necessary
- Penalty shoot-out if scores still level
- Nine named substitutes
- Maximum of five substitutions, with a sixth allowed in extra time (Note: Each team was given only three opportunities to make substitutions, with a fourth opportunity in extra time, excluding substitutions made at half-time, before the start of extra time and at half-time in extra time.)

== Post match ==
Crystal Palace's win was the first major trophy in their history and also meant they qualified for the UEFA Europa League league phase, marking the first time the team qualified for a UEFA competition in their history. They also qualified for the 2025 FA Community Shield to face 2024–25 Premier League champions Liverpool.

Manchester City's was defeat for a second consecutive FA Cup finals. Having finished third in the Premier League and exited the EFL Cup in the fourth round and the Champions League in the knockout play-offs, the defeat meant City, despite winning the 2024 FA Community Shield, finished the season without a major trophy for the first time since the 2016–17 season.

Despite the FA Cup winners getting a spot in the Europa League automatically, Palace's participation in Europe was later downgraded to the UEFA Conference League due to joint-owner John Textor also owning a stake in French club Lyon. UEFA ruled that Palace were in breach of their multi-club ownership rules; because Lyon finished 6th in their league and Palace 12th, Lyon were awarded the Europa League spot. This decision was appealed by Crystal Palace but was unsuccessful.

On 26 May, Crystal Palace held a victory celebration with an open-top bus victory parade around south London before arriving at Selhurst Park for a party.

== Broadcasting ==
The final was televised live in the UK on BBC One, ITV1, STV and UTV, and streamed via BBC iPlayer, ITVX and STV Player. National radio coverage was provided by BBC Radio 5 Live and Talksport, with local radio stations BBC Radio London and BBC Radio Manchester also broadcasting match commentaries.
