= Jaydee Canvot =

French footballer (born 2006)

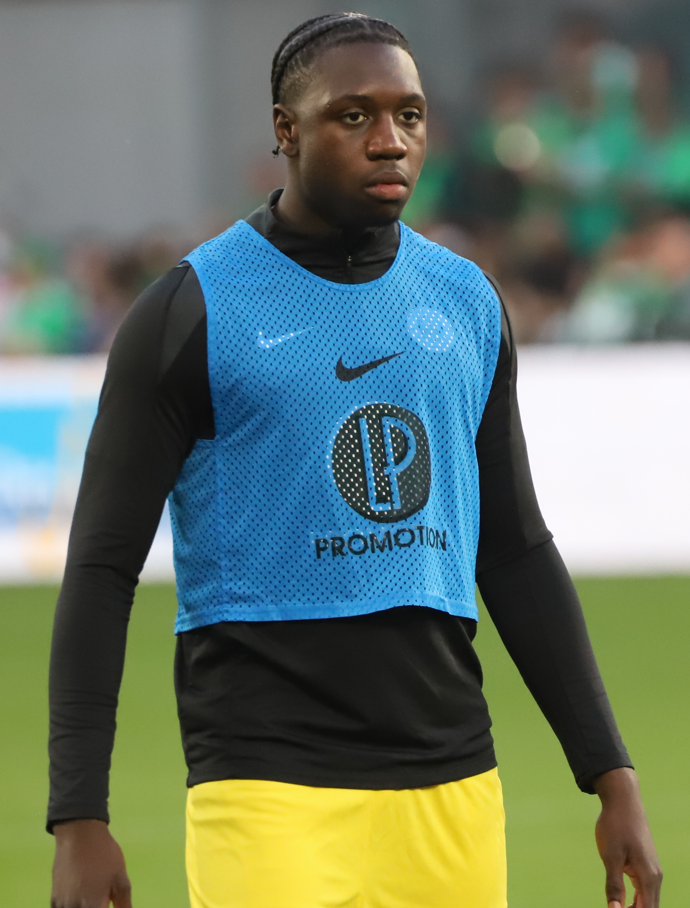
- Canvot with Toulouse in 2025

Personal information
- Full name: Jaydee Bruce Hamady Canvot
- Date of birth: 29 July 2006 (age 20)
- Place of birth: Argenteuil, France
- Height: 1.88 m (6 ft 2 in)
- Position: Centre-back

Team information
- Current team: Crystal Palace
- Number: 6

Youth career
- 2012–2015: RFC Argenteuil
- 2015–2021: AS Bondy
- 2021–2023: Toulouse

Senior career*
Years	Team	Apps	(Gls)
2023–2025	Toulouse B	4	(0)
2024–2025	Toulouse	18	(0)
2025–	Crystal Palace	28	(0)

International career^{‡}
2021	France U16	2	(1)
2023	France U17	3	(0)
2024–2025	France U19	8	(1)
2025	France U20	4	(0)
2025–	France U21	10	(0)
- * Club domestic league appearances and goals as of 31 October 2026 ‡ National team caps and goals as of 6 October 2026

Jaydee Bruce Hamady Canvot (born 29 July 2006) is a French professional footballer who plays as a centre-back for Premier League club Crystal Palace.

== Youth career ==
Canvot was born on 29 July 2006 in the Paris suburb of Argenteuil and began his youth career at local club RFC Argenteuil, before moving to AS Bondy in 2015 and eventually Toulouse. He was also a part of the prestigious Clairefontaine academy, where he transitioned from an attacker to a defender, and eventually caught the eye of Toulouse scouts.

== Club career ==
Canvot played his first professional game in a 6–1 home defeat for Toulouse II against Le Puy Foot in the Championnat National 2 on 23 March 2024.

In June 2024, he signed his first professional contract with Toulouse and he made his first-team debut in a 2–0 Ligue 1 loss to Brest on 22 September 2024, coming on as a late substitute for Ümit Akdağ. Canvot went on to establish himself as a semi-regular in the first team in the coming months, both in midfield and at the back, playing 90 minutes in games against Strasbourg, Lyon, Auxerre and PSG.

After his first start against Lens, his coach Carles Martínez Novell said on his performance, "Jaydee has been working with us since the first day of preseason. Today, we felt like it was the right day to launch him, and he was ready. He played like an experienced player".

=== Crystal Palace ===
Canvot signed for the English Premier League club Crystal Palace on 1 September 2025 on a four-year deal. He made 36 appearances in his first season at the club, becoming a regular starter after Marc Guéhi left the club in January 2026. Canvot secured consecutive Player of the Match awards in April against West Ham United and Fiorentina, and helped Crystal Palace to the 2025–26 UEFA Conference League title, starting and playing the full game in the final, as Palace beat Rayo Vallecano 1-0.

In March 2026, Canvot received criticism for celebrating a red card wrongly shown to defender Gabriel Gudmundsson during a 0-0 draw against Leeds United.

On 18 October 2026, Canvot scored an own goal within four minutes against Brighton & Hove Albion in the Premier League.

== International career ==
Born in metropolitan France, Canvot is of Senegalese, Guadeloupean and Martiniquais descent. He is a youth international for France, having played with the under-17 and under-19 teams.

== Style of play ==
Canvot has described himself as "Athletic, pretty good on the ball, pretty technical for my size, fast, creative, aggressive, and good defensively." He has previously been described as calm on the ball and playing like an experienced player. Although his main position is as a centre-back, he has also shown versatility, occasionally playing as a right-back and a defensive midfielder.

== Career statistics ==
As of match played 31 October 2026

Appearances and goals by club, season and competition
Club	Season	League			National cup (Note: Includes Coupe de France, FA Cup)		League cup (Note: Includes EFL Cup)		Europe		Total	
Club	Season	Division	Apps	Goals	Apps	Goals	Apps	Goals	Apps	Goals	Apps	Goals
Toulouse B	2023–24	Championnat National 2	2	0	—		—		—		2	0
Toulouse B	2024–25	Championnat National 3	2	0	—		—		—		2	0
Toulouse B	Total		4	0	—		—		—		4	0
Toulouse	2024–25	Ligue 1	14	0	2	0	—		—		16	0
Toulouse	2025–26	Ligue 1	2	0	—		—		—		2	0
Toulouse	Total		16	0	2	0	—		—		18	0
Crystal Palace	2025–26	Premier League	20	0	1	0	3	0	12 (Note: Appearances in UEFA Conference League)	0	36	0
Crystal Palace	2026–27	Premier League	8	0	0	0	0	0	3 (Note: Appearances in UEFA Europa League)	0	11	0
Crystal Palace	Total		28	0	1	0	3	0	15	0	47	0
Career total			48	0	3	0	3	0	15	0	69	0

== Honours ==
Crystal Palace

- UEFA Conference League: 2025–26

France U20

- Maurice Revello Tournament: 2025
