= Myron van Brederode =

Dutch footballer (born 2003)

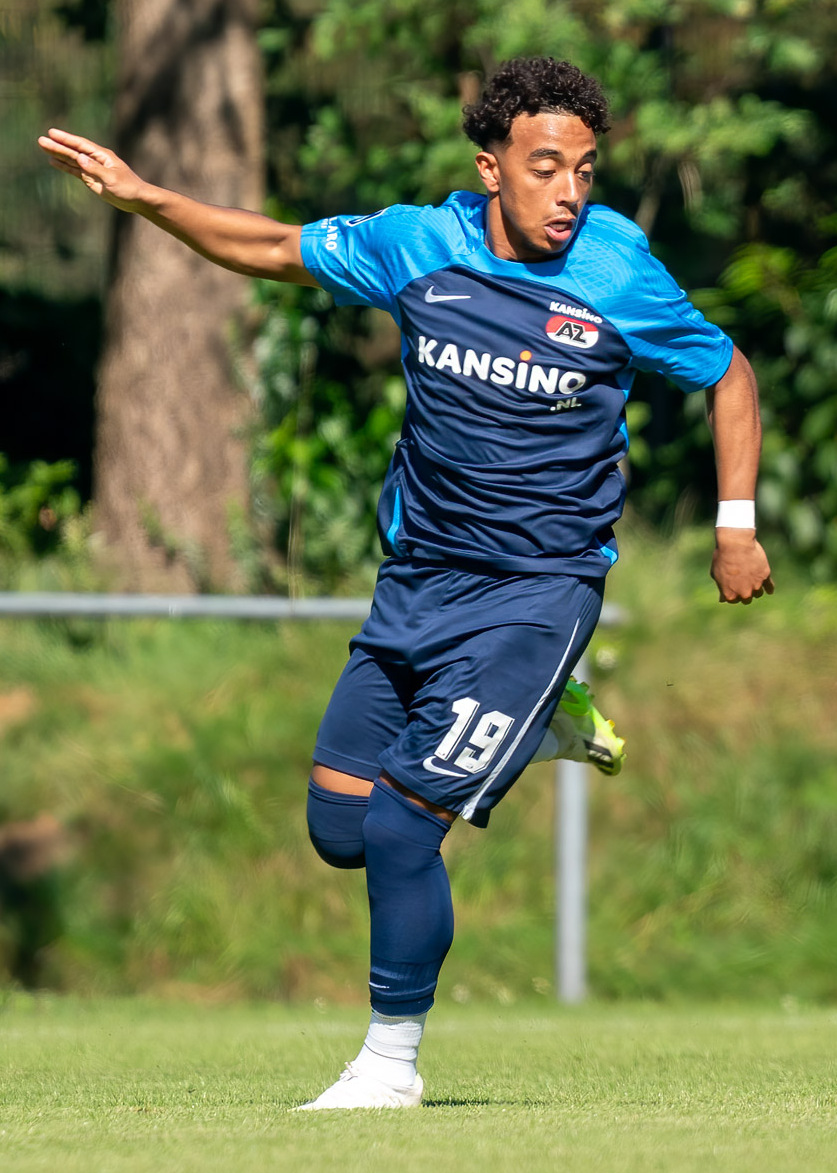
- van Brederode with AZ in 2023

Personal information
- Date of birth: 6 July 2003 (age 23)
- Place of birth: Hoofddorp, Netherlands
- Height: 1.74 m (5 ft 9 in)
- Position: Left winger

Team information
- Current team: Mechelen
- Number: 9

Youth career
- 2009–2016: Overbos
- 2015–2016: AFC
- 2016–2020: AZ

Senior career*
Years	Team	Apps	(Gls)
2020–2024	Jong AZ	19	(1)
2022–2025	AZ	58	(6)
2024–2025	→ Fortuna Düsseldorf (loan)	24	(4)
2025–	Mechelen	34	(9)

International career^{‡}
2019	Netherlands U16	4	(2)
2019	Netherlands U16	8	(1)
2019	Netherlands U19	5	(2)
2023	Netherlands U20	1	(0)
2024–2025	Netherlands U21	18	(1)
- * Club domestic league appearances and goals as of 31 May 2026 ‡ National team caps and goals as of 25 June 2025

Myron van Brederode (born 6 July 2003) is a Dutch professional footballer who plays as a left winger for Belgian Pro League club Mechelen.

== Club career ==
Van Brederode is a youth product of Overbos and AFC, before moving to the youth academy of AZ in 2016. He signed a contract with AZ in 2020, and began his senior career with Jong AZ shortly after. He signed a professional contract on 7 April 2022, and began training with the senior team. He made his professional debut with AZ in a 3–1 Eredivisie win over RKC Waalwijk on 15 May 2022, coming on as a late substitute in the 80th minute.

On 30 August 2024, van Brederode moved to Fortuna Düsseldorf in Germany on loan with an option to buy.

On 6 September 2025, van Brederode signed a four-year contract with Mechelen in Belgium.

== International career ==
Van Brederode is a youth international for the Netherlands, having represented the Netherlands U16s, U17s, and U19.

== Career statistics ==
As of match played 25 August 2024

Appearances and goals by club, season and competition
Club	Season	League			Cup		Continental		Total	
Club	Season	Division	Apps	Goals	Apps	Goals	Apps	Goals	Apps	Goals
Jong AZ	2020–21	Eerste Divisie	1	0	–		–		1	0
Jong AZ	2021–22	Eerste Divisie	11	1	–		–		11	1
Jong AZ	2022–23	Eerste Divisie	6	0	–		–		6	0
Jong AZ	2023–24	Eerste Divisie	1	0	–		–		1	0
Jong AZ	Total		19	1	–		–		19	1
AZ	2021–22	Eredivisie	1	0	0	0	–		1	0
AZ	2022–23	Eredivisie	25	4	1	0	17 (Note: Appearances in UEFA Europa Conference League)	1	43	5
AZ	2023–24	Eredivisie	29	2	3	1	5	1	37	4
AZ	2024–25	Eredivisie	3	0	0	0	0	0	3	0
AZ	Total		58	6	4	1	22	2	84	9
Career total			77	7	4	1	22	2	103	10
