= 2016 IFA Shield =

২০১৬ আইএফএ শিল্ড

Tournament details
- Country: India
- Dates: 16 February – 6 March 2016
- Teams: 10

Final positions
- Champions: Tata Football Academy (1st title)
- Runners-up: AIFF Elite Academy

Tournament statistics
- Matches played: 23
- Goals scored: 83 (3.61 per match)
- Top goal scorer(s): (England) Francis Baptiste (India) Baoringdao Bodo (6 Goals)

Awards
- Best player: (India) Baoringdao Bodo

The 2016 IFA Shield (officially known as the LG IFA Shield 2016 for sponsorship reasons) was the 120th edition of the IFA Shield. The tournament is designed as a U19 youth football tournament since 2015.

This year ten football clubs going to participate including two overseas football clubs. The winners of LG IFA Shield was awarded with an amount of ₹ 5 Lakhs, while the second seeded team will get an amount of ₹ 3 Lakhs.

The tournament was managed by Ekalavya Sports Foundation, run by former international Kalyan Chaubey and other TFA graduates.

Tata Football Academy became the champions of the tournament by beating AIFF Elite Academy on 6 March 2016 which was played at Mohun Bagan Ground. The score was even 2–2 during the regulation time. After extra time match ended 3–2 in the favour of Tata Football Academy. Shubham Ghosh was awarded the man of the match and Baoringdao Bodo player of the tournament.

== Venue ==
Most of the matches were held at East Bengal Ground and Mohun Bagan Ground while Kalyani Stadium and Barasat Stadium were the other venues.

== Qualifying round ==
Four teams played in knockout format. The winner of the knockouts qualified for the final phase of the tournament.

Quarterfinals
12 February 2016
Tata Academy	4
Southern Samity	0
11 February 2016
Aryan (p)	0 (7)
NB Rainbow	0 (6)
11 February 2016
Tollygunge Agragami	1
Bengal Football Academy	8
11 February 2016
Pathachakra	6
Bhawanipore	0

Semi-finals
13 February 2016
Tata Academy	1
Aryan	0
13 February 2016
Bengal Football Academy	3
Pathachakra	0

Finals
15 February 2016
Tata Academy	3
Bengal Football Academy	1

* Tata Academy qualified for final phase of 2016 IFA U19 Shield.

== Final phase ==
All times are Indian Standard Time (IST) – UTC+05:30.

=== Group A ===
Pos	Team	Pld	W	D	L	GF	GA	GD	Pts	Qualification
1	(India) Tata Football Academy	4	4	0	0	10	2	+8	12	Advance to Semi-finals
2	(England) Crystal Palace	4	3	0	1	10	5	+5	9	Advance to Semi-finals
3	(India) East Bengal	4	2	0	2	4	3	+1	6	
4	(India) Salgaocar	4	1	0	3	4	11	−7	3	
5	(India) United	4	0	0	4	3	10	−7	0	

Source: IFA Shield 2016
Rules for classification: 1) points; 2) goal difference; 3) goals scored; 4) head-to-head result .

=== Fixtures and Results ===
16 February 2016	East Bengal (India)	2–1	(India) United	Barasat Stadium
17:30	Arup Roy 49'; Budhwa Bara 70'	Report	33' (pen.) Sandip Bhattacharjee

17 February 2016	Salgaocar (India)	1–4	(India) Tata Football Academy	Kalyani Stadium
14:30	Ronaldo Oliveira 90+1'	Report	34' Md Firoz Khan; 52' Subham Ghosh; 70' Mobashir Rahman; 90+2' Seino Kuki

19 February 2016	United (India)	1–2	(India) Salgaocar	Kalyani Stadium
14:30	Sandip Bhattacharjee 90+1'	Report	44', 90+2' Liston Colaco

19 February 2016	East Bengal (India)	0–1	(India) Tata Football Academy	Barasat Stadium
16:30		Report	45+1' Mobashir Rahman

21 February 2016	United (India)	0–2	(India) Tata Football Academy	Kalyani Stadium
14:30		Report	2' Rakesh Yadav; 29' Billu Teli

23 February 2016	Salgaocar (India)	1–4	(England) Crystal Palace	Barasat Stadium
17:30	Tristaw Falcao 72'	Report	12', 56' Levi Lumeka; 27' Francis Baptiste; 86' Kian Flanagan

25 February 2016	Crystal Palace (England)	1–3	(India) Tata Football Academy	Kalyani Stadium
14:30	Victor Fundi 6'	Report	23' (pen.), 54' Shubham Ghosh; 45+3' Md. Firoz Khan

25 February 2016	East Bengal (India)	2–0	(India) Salgaocar	Barasat Stadium
16:30	Arup Roy 65', 75'	Report

27 February 2016	United (India)	1–4	(England) Crystal Palace	Barasat Stadium
16:30	Sandip Bhattacharjee	Report	7', 48', 55' Francis Baptiste; 90+4' Levi Lumeka

29 February 2016	East Bengal (India)	0–1	(England) Crystal Palace	Barasat Stadium
16:30		Report	70' Francis Baptiste

=== Group B ===
Pos	Team	Pld	W	D	L	GF	GA	GD	Pts	Qualification
1	(India) AIFF U19	4	4	0	0	17	5	+12	12	Advance to Semi-finals
2	(Malaysia) Frenz United	4	3	0	1	11	6	+5	9	Advance to Semi-finals
3	(India) DSK Academy	4	2	0	2	10	7	+3	6	
4	(India) Mohun Bagan	4	0	1	3	1	8	−7	1	
5	(India) Mohammedan	4	0	1	3	3	14	−11	1	

Source: IFA Shield 2016
Rules for classification: 1) points; 2) goal difference; 3) goals scored; 4) head-to-head result .

=== Fixtures and Results ===
16 February 2016	AIFF U19 (India)	4–3	(India) DSK Academy	Barasat Stadium
14:30	Prosenjit Chakraborty 59'; Bedashwor Singh 77'; Baoringdao Bodo 80'; Anirudh Thapa 89'	Report	5' Lallianzuala Chhangte; 9' Lalruatpuia; 63' Gagandeep Singh

18 February 2016	Mohammedan (India)	1–1	(India) Mohun Bagan	Barasat Stadium
16:30	Kamal Roy 45+1'	Report	76' Amit Gayen

20 February 2016	Mohammedan (India)	0–3	(India) DSK Academy	Kalyani Stadium
14:30		Report	36' Prasanth K 43', 51' Lallianzuala Chhangte

22 February 2016	Mohun Bagan (India)	0–4	(India) AIFF U19	Barasat Stadium
14:30		Report	11' Amal Das; 22' (pen.) Edmund Lalrindika; 57' Prosenjit Chakraborty; 63' Jerry Lalrinzuala

22 February 2016	DSK Academy (India)	2–3	(Malaysia) Frenz United	Barasat Stadium
17:30	Lallianzuala Chhangte 9'; Lalruatpuia 49'	Report	11' Shahrul Akmal; 16' Hadi Fayyad; 90+3' Aep Maulana

24 February 2016	AIFF U19 (India)	4–2	(Malaysia) Frenz United	Barasat Stadium
16:30	Prosenjit Chakroborty 21'; Baoringdao Bodo 46', 62'; Bedashwor Singh 47'	Report	62' Hadi Fayyadh; 65' Dody Alfayed

25 February 2016	Mohun Bagan (India)	0–2	(India) DSK Academy	Mohun Bagan Ground
16:30		Report	19' (pen.) Lallianzuala Chhangte; 59' Sk Asiruddin

26 February 2016	Mohammedan (India)	0–5	(Malaysia) Frenz United	Barasat Stadium
16:30		Report	18' Hadi Fayyadh; 43' Dody Alfayed; 55', 89' Shahrul Akmal; 85' Aizat Mukhlis

28 February 2016	Mohun Bagan (India)	0–1	(Malaysia) Frenz United	Mohun Bagan Ground
16:30		Report	12' Aep Maulana

28 February 2016	Mohammedan (India)	2–5	(India) AIFF U19	Barasat Stadium
16:30	Diptanu Das 29'; Sanu Hazra 90+2' (pen.)	Report	9', 70' Bedashwor Singh; 38' Edmund Lalrindika; 55' Baoringdao Bodo; 90+1' Prosenjit Chakraborty

== Knockouts ==
Semi-finals
2 March 2016
(India) AIFF U19 (p)	2 (6)
(England) Crystal Palace	2 (5)
3 March 2016
(India) Tata Academy	1
(Malaysia) Frenz United	0

Final
6 March 2016
(India) AIFF U19	2
(India) Tata Academy	3

=== Semi-finals ===
Team 1	Score	Team 2
AIFF U19 (India)	(6) 2–2 (5)	(England) Crystal Palace
Tata Academy (India)	1–0	(Malaysia) Frenz United

==== Semi-final 1 ====
2 March 2016	AIFF U19 (India)	2–2 (a.e.t.) (6–5 p)	(England) Crystal Palace	Mohun Bagan Ground
16:30	Bodo 21' (pen.); Prosenjit Chakraborty 45'	Report	Baptiste 52'; Flanagan 80'

==== Semi-final 2 ====
3 March 2016	Tata Football Academy (India)	1–0	(Malaysia) Frenz United	Mohun Bagan Ground
16:30	Seino Kuki 36'	Report

=== Final ===
6 March 2016	AIFF U19 (India)	2–3 (a.e.t.)	(India) Tata Football Academy	Mohun Bagan Ground
16:30	Bodo 31'; Lalrinzuala 90+4'	Report	Shubham Ghosh 44' (pen.), 72'; Lalrinzuala 100' (o.g.)

== Statistics ==
As of 2 March 2016

=== Top scorers ===
Rank	Player	Team	Goals
1	(England) Francis Baptiste	(England) Crystal Palace	6
1	(India) Baoringdao Bodo	(India) AIFF Academy	6
2
2	(India) Lallianzuala Chhangte	(India) DSK Shivajians	5
2	(India) Prosenjit Chakraborty	(India) AIFF Academy	5
3	(India) Bedashwor Singh	(India) AIFF Academy	4
4	(Malaysia) Hadi Fayyad	(Malaysia) Frenz United	3
4	(England) Levi Lumeka	(England) Crystal Palace	3
4	(India) Sandip Bhattacharjee	(India) United SC	3
4	(Malaysia) Shahrul Akmal	(Malaysia) Frenz United	3
