= Trevor Doornbusch =

Dutch-Curaçaoan footballer (born 1999)

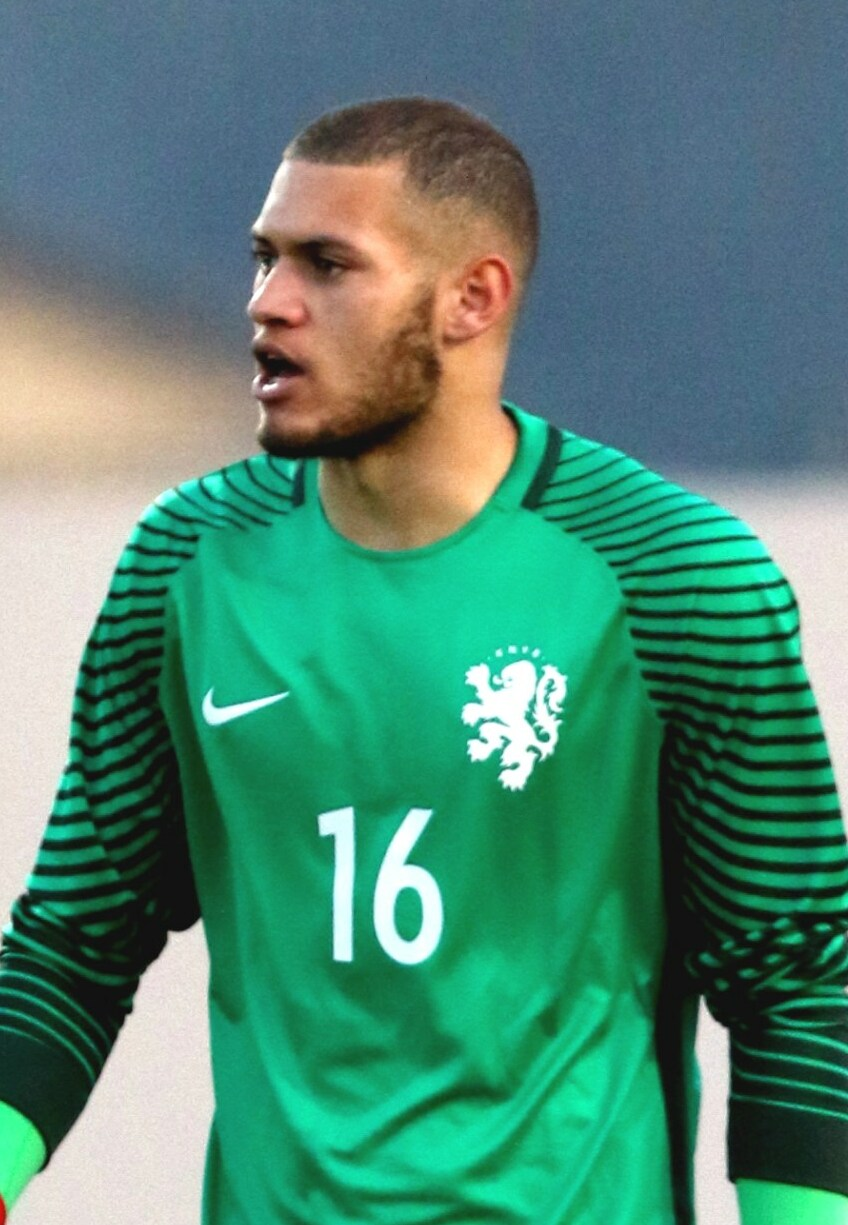
- Doornbusch with Netherlands U18 in 2017

Personal information
- Full name: Trevor Irving Doornbusch
- Date of birth: 6 July 1999 (age 27)
- Place of birth: Haarlem, Netherlands
- Height: 1.88 m (6 ft 2 in)
- Position: Goalkeeper

Team information
- Current team: VVV
- Number: 16

Youth career
- 2005–2007: Overbos
- 2007–2011: Ajax
- 2011–2022: Overbos
- 2012–2013: RKSV RODA '23
- 2013–2017: Heerenveen

Senior career*
Years	Team	Apps	(Gls)
2017–2020	Heerenveen	0	(0)
2020–2022	Telstar	15	(0)
2022–2024	Dordrecht	3	(0)
2025–	VVV	13	(0)

International career^{‡}
2017	Netherlands U17	1	(0)
2017–2018	Netherlands U18	2	(0)
2017	Netherlands U19	2	(0)
2023–	Curaçao	8	(0)
- * Club domestic league appearances and goals as of 15 May 2025 ‡ National team caps and goals as of 7 June 2026

Trevor Irving Doornbusch (born 6 July 1999) is a professional footballer who plays as a goalkeeper for Eerste Divisie club VVV-Venlo. Born in the Netherlands, he plays for the Curaçao national team.

== Club career ==
Doornbusch is a product of the youth academies of Overbos, Ajax, RKSV RODA '23, and Heerenveen. He began his senior career with Heerenveen in 2017, where he acted as their backup goalkeeper. On 5 April 2018, he signed his first professional contract with Heerenveen until 2020. He transferred to Telstar in the summer of 2020, and had a controversial stint where he played some games, lost his starting spot, and eventually reclaimed the position. On 3 August 2022, he transferred to Dordrecht where he was again the reserve goalkeeper.

On 27 February 2025, Doornbusch signed a two-and-a-half-season contract with VVV-Venlo.

== International career ==
Born in the Netherlands, Doornbusch is of Curaçaoan descent. He is a former youth international for the Netherlands, having played up to the Netherlands U18s.

He was called up to the Curaçao national team for a set of matches in March 2023. On 14 July 2023, Doornbush made his debut for Curaçao in a friendly against Puerto Rico in Miami, resulting in a draw (0–0). In June 2025, he was named in the squad for the 2025 CONCACAF Gold Cup. In May 2026, he was named in Curaçao's squad for the 2026 FIFA World Cup, the country's first-ever appearance at the tournament.

== Career statistics ==
=== Club ===
As of match played 23 December 2023

Appearances and goals by club, season and competition
Club	Season	League			National Cup		Other		Total	
Club	Season	Division	Apps	Goals	Apps	Goals	Apps	Goals	Apps	Goals
Heerenveen	2017–18	Eredivisie	0	0	0	0	0	0	0	0
Heerenveen	2018–19	Eredivisie	0	0	0	0	0	0	0	0
Heerenveen	2019–20	Eredivisie	0	0	0	0	0	0	0	0
Telstar	2020–21	Eerste Divisie	2	0	0	0	0	0	2	0
Telstar	2021–22	Eerste Divisie	13	0	1	0	0	0	14	0
Telstar	Total		15	0	1	0	0	0	16	0
Dordrecht	2022–23	Eerste Divisie	0	0	1	0	0	0	1	0
Dordrecht	2023–24	Eerste Divisie	3	0	2	0	0	0	5	0
Dordrecht	Total		3	0	3	0	0	0	6	0
Career total			18	0	4	0	0	0	22	0

=== International ===
As of match played 7 June 2026

Appearances and goals by national team and year
National team	Year	Apps	Goals
Curaçao	2023	6	0
Curaçao	2026	2	0
Total		8	0
