= Jaïro Riedewald =

Dutch footballer (born 1996)

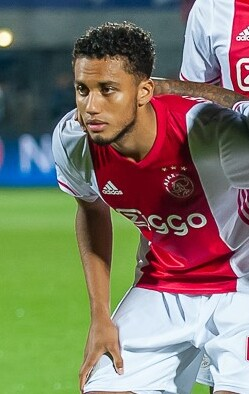
- Riedewald lining up for Ajax in 2016

Personal information
- Full name: Jaïro Jocquim Riedewald
- Date of birth: 9 September 1996 (age 30)
- Place of birth: Haarlem, Netherlands
- Height: 1.82 m (6 ft 0 in)
- Positions: Defensive midfielder; defender

Team information
- Current team: Sheffield United
- Number: 44

Youth career
- SV Overbos
- 2007–2013: Ajax

Senior career*
Years	Team	Apps	(Gls)
2013–2017	Ajax	63	(2)
2013–2015	Jong Ajax	19	(1)
2017–2024	Crystal Palace	80	(2)
2024–2025	Royal Antwerp	25	(0)
2025–	Sheffield United	32	(2)

International career^{‡}
2011	Netherlands U15	2	(0)
2011–2012	Netherlands U16	6	(0)
2012–2013	Netherlands U17	10	(0)
2013–2015	Netherlands U19	15	(1)
2016	Netherlands U21	4	(0)
2015	Netherlands	3	(0)
- * Club domestic league appearances and goals as of 21 November 2026 ‡ National team caps and goals as of 2 September 2016

Jaïro Jocquim Riedewald (born 9 September 1996) is a Dutch professional footballer who plays as a defensive midfielder or left-back for EFL Championship club Sheffield United.

A youth academy product of Ajax, Riedewald spent four seasons at the club, where he became a key player under manager Frank de Boer. In 2017, he was signed by Premier League club Crystal Palace, briefly reuniting with De Boer; he went on to make nearly 100 appearances in seven years in England.

Riedewald represented the Netherlands as a youth player from under-15 to under-21 level, before earning three caps for the senior side in 2015.

== Club career ==
=== Ajax ===
On 15 March 2013, Riedewald signed his first professional contract with Ajax, a product of the Ajax Youth Academy having joined the club from SV Overbos at the age of 11. His first contract with the club was a three-year contract binding him to the club until 2016. On 21 December 2013 he made his professional debut in the Eerste Divisie, the second tier of professional football in the Netherlands, playing for the reserves team Jong Ajax, in a match against VVV-Venlo which ended in a 5–1 away loss.

On 14 December 2013, Ajax head coach Frank de Boer announced the inclusion of Riedewald in the first team squad for the away match against SC Cambuur on 15 December 2013. Not having made an appearance in that fixture it was the first time he was called for the first team. He made his debut for the first team on 19 December 2013 in the KNVB Cup match against IJsselmeervogels. The match ended in a 3–0 away win, with Riedewald coming on for Daley Blind in the 73rd minute of the match. Three days later he made his Eredivisie debut against Roda JC Kerkrade. After Bojan Krkić, Riedewald was substituted on as well in the 80th minute, where he replaced Christian Poulsen, quickly scoring two goals, after trailing 1–0, helping Ajax to a 2–1 away victory, hereby becoming the youngest scoring debutant in the club and league history with 17 years, 104 days. The youngest scoring player before him in the Dutch Eredivisie was Jeroen Lumu with 17 years, 111 days, while Marco van Basten was the youngest scoring debutant at the club with 17 year, 154 days of age.

In January 2014, Riedewald became a permanent member of the first team at Ajax. On 27 February 2014, Riedewald made his continental debut for Ajax, in the UEFA Europa League away match against Red Bull Salzburg where he replaced Christian Poulsen in the 63rd minute in an eventual 3–1 loss.

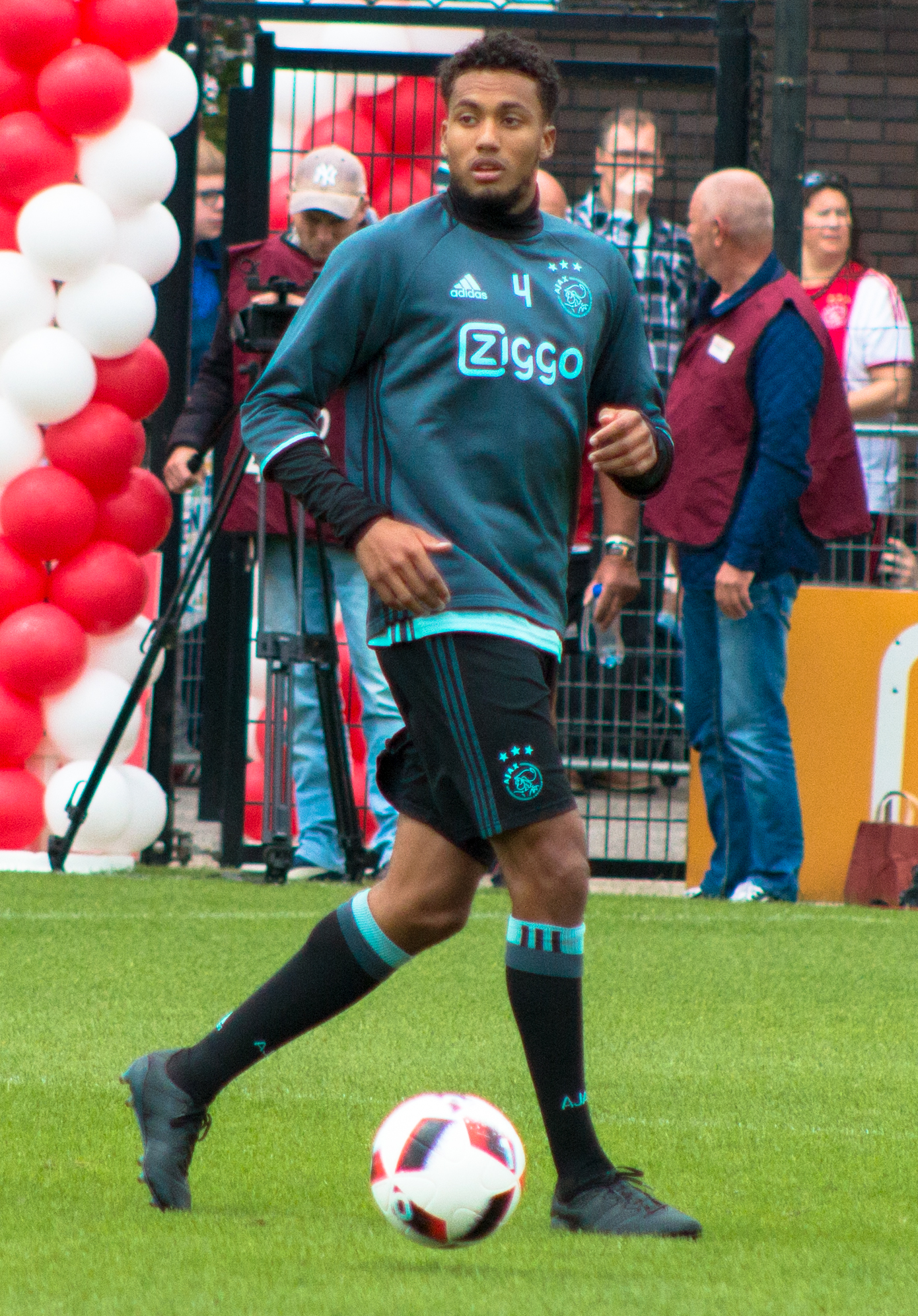
Riedewald training with Ajax in 2016

After Niklas Moisander departed the club at the start of the 2015–16 season, Ajax manager Frank de Boer decided to choose Riedewald as the new partner of Joël Veltman in central defense. In de Klassieker against Feyenoord on 7 February 2016, Riedewald got injured soon after kick-off; he had broken his left ankle, which ended his season early. Until that moment, he had only missed one league game due to suspension. However, he returned early from injury on 1 May 2016, replacing Kenny Tete in the 76th minute in a match against FC Twente.

After Ajax lost the Eredivisie title to PSV on the last matchday of the season by drawing to De Graafschap, manager De Boer decided to leave the club. His successor Peter Bosz decided to use Riedewald more as a defensive midfielder during the opening of the season. On 15 September 2016, Riedewald scored the rebound of Davy Klaassen's missed penalty in a Europa League match against Panathinaikos, his first goal for Ajax since his debut match.

=== Crystal Palace ===
In July 2017, Riedewald reunited with former Ajax manager Frank de Boer signing a five-year contract with Premier League side Crystal Palace for an undisclosed fee, believed to be in the region of £8m.

He was named the club's player of the month in January and October 2020. He scored his first goal for Palace in a 2–1 away win over Fulham on 24 October 2020.

In February 2021, Riedewald extended his contract with Crystal Palace until 2024.

On 10 May 2024, Palace announced that Riedewald, alongside teammate James Tomkins, would depart the club upon the expiry of his contract on 30 June, ending his seven-year long tenure with the Eagles, and he would later become a free agent.

=== Royal Antwerp ===
On 13 August 2024, Riedewald joined Belgian club Royal Antwerp on a one-year contract.

=== Sheffield United ===
On 17 October 2025, Riedewald returned to England, joining fellow Championship side Sheffield United on a short-term deal until January 2026. On 15 December, his contract was extended until the end of the season, with the option to extend further.

On 18 May 2026, the club announced that Riedewald would depart the club upon the expiry of his contract the following month. Although Sheffield United announced in May 2026 that Riedewald would be released, he subsequently signed a new one-year contract with the club on 2 July 2026. The Blades also retain the option to extend the agreement by a further year.

== International career ==
Riedewald received his first call up to the senior Netherlands team in August 2015. On 6 September, he made his official debut for the Oranje against Turkey.

In 2024, despite no longer being eligible to switch nationality, Riedewald reportedly expressed interest in playing for the Indonesian national team.

== Personal life ==
Born in Haarlem, Riedewald is of mixed Dutch, Surinamese, and Indonesian heritage. His father is Surinamese, while his mother has mixed Dutch-Indonesian ancestry.

== Career statistics ==
=== Club ===
As of match played 5 September 2026

Appearances and goals by club, season and competition
Club	Season	League			National cup (Note: Includes KNVB Cup, FA Cup, Belgian Cup)		League cup (Note: Includes EFL Cup)		Europe		Other		Total	
Club	Season	Division	Apps	Goals	Apps	Goals	Apps	Goals	Apps	Goals	Apps	Goals	Apps	Goals
Jong Ajax	2013–14	Eerste Divisie	10	0	—		—		—		—		10	0
Jong Ajax	2014–15	Eerste Divisie	9	1	—		—		—		—		9	1
Jong Ajax	Total		19	1	—		—		—		—		19	1
Ajax	2013–14	Eredivisie	5	2	1	0	—		1 (Note: Appearance in UEFA Europa League)	0	0	0	7	2
Ajax	2014–15	Eredivisie	19	0	2	0	—		4 (Note: Three appearances in UEFA Champions League, one in the UEFA Europa League)	0	0	0	25	0
Ajax	2015–16	Eredivisie	23	0	0	0	—		10 (Note: Two appearances in UEFA Champions League, eight in UEFA Europa League)	0	0	0	33	0
Ajax	2016–17	Eredivisie	16	0	1	0	—		11 (Note: Four appearances in UEFA Champions League, seven appearances and one goal in UEFA Europa League)	1	0	0	28	1
Ajax	Total		63	2	4	0	—		26	1	0	0	93	3
Crystal Palace	2017–18	Premier League	12	0	1	0	2	0	—		—		15	0
Crystal Palace	2018–19	Premier League	0	0	1	0	3	0	—		—		4	0
Crystal Palace	2019–20	Premier League	17	0	1	0	1	0	—		—		19	0
Crystal Palace	2020–21	Premier League	33	2	1	0	0	0	—		—		34	2
Crystal Palace	2021–22	Premier League	3	0	2	1	0	0	—		—		5	1
Crystal Palace	2022–23	Premier League	6	0	0	0	1	0	—		—		7	0
Crystal Palace	2023–24	Premier League	9	0	1	0	2	0	—		—		12	0
Crystal Palace	Total		80	2	7	1	9	0	—		—		97	3
Royal Antwerp	2024–25	Belgian Pro League	20	0	1	0	—		—		0	0	21	0
Sheffield United	2025–26	EFL Championship	25	3	1	0	0	0	—		—		26	3
Sheffield United	2026–27	EFL Championship	4	0	0	0	1	0	—		—		5	0
Sheffield United	Total		29	3	1	0	1	0	—		—		31	3
Career total			212	7	13	1	10	0	26	1	0	0	261	9

=== International ===
Appearances and goals by national team and year
National team	Year	Apps	Goals
Netherlands	2015	3	0
Total		3	0

== Honours ==
Ajax

- Eredivisie: 2013–14
- UEFA Europa League runner-up: 2016–17
