= 2019–20 Crystal Palace F.C. season =

English football club season

Crystal Palace
2019–20 season
- Chairman: Steve Parish
- Manager: Roy Hodgson
- Stadium: Selhurst Park
- Premier League: 14th
- FA Cup: Third round (eliminated by Derby County)
- EFL Cup: Second round (eliminated by Colchester United)
- Top goalscorer: Jordan Ayew (9 goals)
- Biggest win: 2–0 (against 3 teams)
- Biggest defeat: 4–0 (against 2 teams)
Home colours	Away colours	Third colours

The 2019–20 season was Crystal Palace's seventh consecutive season in the Premier League (extending their longest ever spell in the top division of English football) and the 114th year in their history. In this season, Palace participated in the Premier League, FA Cup and EFL Cup. The season covered the period from 1 July 2019 to 26 July 2020 as the season was extended due to the COVID-19 pandemic in the United Kingdom.

== Season summary ==
=== August ===
Crystal Palace started the 2019–20 season relatively positively, with a 0–0 draw at home to Everton. The next week Palace lost 1–0 to newly promoted Sheffield United, with John Lundstram scoring the only goal early in the second half. Palace got their first two goals of the season in a shock 2–1 win at Manchester United. Jordan Ayew scored midway through the first half, with Daniel James thinking he'd rescued a point for Manchester United with his curling equaliser late on. However, Patrick van Aanholt scored past the goalkeeper at the near post winning the game for Crystal Palace in stoppage time. Palace then entered the EFL Cup in the second round, being drawn at home to League Two Colchester United. After a 0–0 draw, Palace lost the penalty shootout after Andros Townsend’s penalty was saved by goalkeeper Dean Gerken. Back in the Premier League, Palace beat Aston Villa 1–0, but the game turned toxic after a decision by referee Kevin Friend to disallow a late equaliser by Henri Lansbury.

=== September ===
After the international break, Crystal Palace were back in action at the Tottenham Hotspur Stadium, losing 4–0, with goals from Son Heung-Min, Erik Lamela and a Patrick van Aanholt own goal. The first home game in September came against Wolverhampton Wanderers. Palace took the lead early in the second half thanks to a fortunate own goal from Leander Dendoncker, but could not hold on due to Diogo Jota’s last-gasp equaliser. The next game was also at Selhurst Park, a 2–0 win over Norwich City with goals from Andros Townsend and a Luka Milivojević penalty.

=== October ===
Palace started October strongly, where despite going 1–0 down to Sebastien Haller’s goal for West Ham United, a Luka Milivojević penalty levelled the game. Jordan Ayew then scored a late winner, initially ruled out for offside but given by VAR. After an international break, Palace were back at Selhurst Park against Manchester City where goals from Gabriel Jesus and David Silva downed the high-spirited Eagles. The next game was away to Arsenal, where despite going 2–0 down with goals from Sokratis and David Luiz after just 10 minutes, a stunning fightback ensued with a Luka Milivojević penalty and a header from Jordan Ayew levelled the game at 2–2. Sokratis then had a late winner disallowed by VAR due to a foul on Luka Milivojević.

== Pre-season ==
Palace confirmed their pre-season schedule in June 2019. A friendly against Barnet was also confirmed.

9 July 2019 Uhrencup	FC Luzern	1–1 (5–6 p)	Crystal Palace	Biel/Bienne, Switzerland
20:00 CEST	Schürpf 6'	Report	Benteke 1'	Stadium: Tissot Arena
	Penalties
	Demhasaj (penalty scored); Lucas (penalty scored); Kakabadze (penalty scored); Tia (penalty scored); Schulz (penalty scored)		McArthur (penalty scored); Ward (penalty scored); Kelly (penalty scored); Schlupp (penalty scored); Sørloth (penalty scored); Kirby (penalty scored)

13 July 2019 Uhrencup	BSC Young Boys	2–0	Crystal Palace	Bern, Switzerland
15:00 CEST	Ngamaleu 5'; Hoarau 32'	Report		Stadium: Stadion Neufeld

16 July 2019 Friendly	Barnet	6–2	Crystal Palace	Canons Park
19:45 BST	Bettamer 40' (pen.); Barham 41'; Tutonda 47', 60'; Akinola 70'; Trialist 90'	Report	Boateng 3'; Wickham 9'	Stadium: The Hive Stadium

19 July 2019 Friendly	Nottingham Forest	1–0	Crystal Palace	Nottingham
19:45	Adomah 32'	Report		Stadium: City Ground

20 July 2019 Friendly	Bromley	1–0	Crystal Palace	Bromley
15:00	Kizzi 27'	Report		Stadium: Hayes Lane

27 July 2019 Friendly	Bristol City	0–5	Crystal Palace	Bristol
15:00		Report	Townsend 34'; Schlupp 15'; Benteke 54'; Meyer 70'; Wickham 75'	Stadium: Ashton Gate Stadium

30 July 2019 Friendly	AFC Wimbledon	2–2	Crystal Palace	Kingston upon Thames
19:45	Macnab 69'; Wood 90+2'	Report	Pierrick 32', 74'	Stadium: Kingsmeadow

3 August 2019 Friendly	Crystal Palace	0–4	Hertha BSC	Selhurst
15:00		Report	Duda 44'; Ibišević 52'; Mittelstadt 76'; Selke 82' (pen.)	Stadium: Selhurst Park

== Competitions ==
=== Premier League ===
Palace competed in the Premier League for the seventh year in a row, and finished the season in 14th place.

==== League table ====
Pos	Team	Pld	W	D	L	GF	GA	GD	Pts
12	Everton	38	13	10	15	44	56	−12	49
13	Newcastle United	38	11	11	16	38	58	−20	44
14	Crystal Palace	38	11	10	17	31	50	−19	43
15	Brighton & Hove Albion	38	9	14	15	39	54	−15	41
16	West Ham United	38	10	9	19	49	62	−13	39

Source: Premier League
Rules for classification: 1) Points; 2) Goal difference; 3) Goals scored; 4) If the champions, relegated teams or qualified teams for UEFA competitions cannot be determined by rules 1 to 3, rules 4.1 to 4.3 are applied – 4.1) Points gained in head to head record between such teams; 4.2) Away goals scored in head to head record between such teams; 4.3) Play-offs

==== Results summary ====
Overall								Home						Away					
Pld	W	D	L	GF	GA	GD	Pts	W	D	L	GF	GA	GD	W	D	L	GF	GA	GD
38	11	10	17	31	50	−19	43	6	5	8	15	20	−5	5	5	9	16	30	−14

Last updated: 26 July 2020.

==== Results by matchday ====
Matchday	1	2	3	4	5	6	7	8	9	10	11	12	13	14	15	16	17	18	19	20	21	22	23	24	25	26	27	28	29	30	31	32	33	34	35	36	37	38
Ground	H	A	A	H	A	H	H	A	H	A	H	A	H	A	H	A	H	A	H	A	A	H	A	H	H	A	H	A	H	A	A	H	A	H	A	H	A	H
Result	D	L	W	W	L	D	W	W	L	D	L	L	L	W	W	D	D	L	W	D	D	D	D	L	L	L	W	W	W	W	L	L	L	L	L	L	L	D
Position	10	14	10	4	11	12	9	6	6	6	9	12	14	11	7	8	9	12	9	9	9	9	9	11	14	14	13	12	11	9	10	12	14	14	14	14	14	14

Updated to match(es) played on 26 July 2020. Source: Statto.com
A = Away; H = Home; W = Win; D = Draw; L = Loss

==== Matches ====
The Premier League fixtures for the season were announced on 13 June 2019, with Palace's first match a home match against Everton.

10 August 2019 1	Crystal Palace	0–0	Everton	Selhurst
15:00 BST	Meyer (yellow card) 38'; Milivojević (yellow card) 55'	Report	Bernard (yellow card) 52'; Schneiderlin (yellow card) 54' (yellow-red card) 76'	Stadium: Selhurst Park; Attendance: 25,151; Referee: Jonathan Moss

18 August 2019 2	Sheffield United	1–0	Crystal Palace	Sheffield
14:00 BST	Lundstram (yellow card) 7', (goal) 47'; Baldock (yellow card) 74'; Freeman (yellow card) 85'	Report	McCarthy (yellow card) 74'	Stadium: Bramall Lane; Attendance: 30,197; Referee: David Coote

24 August 2019 3	Manchester United	1–2	Crystal Palace	Manchester
15:00 BST	Wan-Bissaka (yellow card) 46'; James (yellow card) 71', (goal) 89'	Report	Ayew 32'; Milivojević (yellow card) 38'; Cahill (yellow card) 41'; Zaha (yellow card) 79'; Guaita (yellow card) 86'; Van Aanholt 90+3'	Stadium: Old Trafford; Attendance: 73,454; Referee: Paul Tierney

31 August 2019 4	Crystal Palace	1–0	Aston Villa	Selhurst
15:00 BST	Milivojević (yellow card) 58'; Kouyaté (yellow card) 71'; Ayew 73'	Report	Luiz (yellow card) 17'; Taylor (yellow card) 35'; Guilbert (yellow card) 40'; Trézéguet (yellow card) 44' (yellow-red card) 54'; Grealish (yellow card) 90+6'	Stadium: Selhurst Park; Attendance: 25,248; Referee: Kevin Friend

14 September 2019 5	Tottenham Hotspur	4–0	Crystal Palace	Tottenham
15:00 BST	Son 10', 23'; Van Aanholt 21' (o.g.); Lamela 42'; Winks (yellow card) 45+2'; Rose (yellow card) 50'; Vertonghen (yellow card) 53'; Eriksen (yellow card) 60'	Report	Ayew (yellow card) 61'; Ward (yellow card) 89'; Milivojević (yellow card) 90+1'	Stadium: Tottenham Hotspur Stadium; Attendance: 59,812; Referee: Craig Pawson

22 September 2019 6	Crystal Palace	1–1	Wolverhampton Wanderers	Selhurst
14:00 BST	McArthur (yellow card) 45'; Dendoncker 46' (o.g.); Ayew (yellow card) 62'	Report	Coady (yellow card) 44'; Saïss (yellow card) 48' (yellow-red card) 73'; Jota 90+5'	Stadium: Selhurst Park; Attendance: 25,122; Referee: Stuart Attwell

28 September 2019 7	Crystal Palace	2–0	Norwich City	Selhurst
15:00 BST	Milivojević 21' (pen.), (yellow card) 90+4'; Ayew (yellow card) 58'; Schlupp (yellow card) 89'; Townsend 90+2'	Report	Stiepermann (yellow card) 64'	Stadium: Selhurst Park; Attendance: 25,477; Referee: Jonathan Moss

5 October 2019 8	West Ham United	1–2	Crystal Palace	Stratford
17:30 BST	Yarmolenko (yellow card) 44'; Haller 54', (yellow card) 61'; Fredericks (yellow card) 86'	Report	Ward (yellow card) 51'; Van Aanholt 63' (pen.); Ayew 87'; Benteke (yellow card) 90+6'	Stadium: London Stadium; Attendance: 59,912; Referee: Michael Oliver

19 October 2019 9	Crystal Palace	0–2	Manchester City	Selhurst
17:30 BST	Milivojević (yellow card) 13'	Report	Jesus 39'; Silva 41'; Sterling (yellow card) 47'	Stadium: Selhurst Park; Attendance: 25,480; Referee: Anthony Taylor

27 October 2019 10	Arsenal	2–2	Crystal Palace	Holloway
16:30 GMT	Papastathopoulos 7'; David Luiz 9'; Chambers (yellow card) 51'; Guendouzi (yellow card) 90+7'	Report	Milivojević 32' (pen.); Ayew 52'	Stadium: Emirates Stadium; Attendance: 60,345; Referee: Martin Atkinson

3 November 2019 11	Crystal Palace	0–2	Leicester City	Selhurst
14:00 GMT	Schlupp (yellow card) 54'; Tomkins (yellow card) 63'	Report	Evans (yellow card) 48'; Söyüncü 57', (yellow card) 81'; Vardy 88'	Stadium: Selhurst Park; Attendance: 25,480; Referee: Paul Tierney

9 November 2019 12	Chelsea	2–0	Crystal Palace	London
12:30 GMT	Willian (yellow card) 17'; Emerson (yellow card) 31'; Kovačić (yellow card) 33'; Abraham 52'; Pulisic 79'	Report	Zaha (yellow card) 21'; McCarthy (yellow card) 90+3'	Stadium: Stamford Bridge; Attendance: 40,525; Referee: Mike Dean

23 November 2019 13	Crystal Palace	1–2	Liverpool	Selhurst
15:00 GMT	Zaha 82'	Report	Mané 49'; Fabinho (yellow card) 54'; Firmino 85'	Stadium: Selhurst Park; Attendance: 25,486; Referee: Kevin Friend

30 November 2019 14	Burnley	0–2	Crystal Palace	Burnley
15:00 GMT	Bardsley (yellow card) 55'; McNeil (yellow card) 67'	Report	Zaha 45+1'; Schlupp 78'	Stadium: Turf Moor; Attendance: 19,818; Referee: Peter Bankes

3 December 2019 15	Crystal Palace	1–0	Bournemouth	Selhurst
19:30 GMT	Sakho (red card) 19'; Milivojević (yellow card) 71'; McCarthy (yellow card) 72'; Schlupp 76'; McArthur (yellow card) 85'	Report	Solanke (yellow card) 64'; Lerma (yellow card) 67'; Billing (yellow card) 78'	Stadium: Selhurst Park; Attendance: 23,497; Referee: Anthony Taylor

7 December 2019 16	Watford	0–0	Crystal Palace	Watford
15:00 GMT	Doucouré (yellow card) 34'; Cathcart (yellow card) 40'; Femenía (yellow card) 87'; Capoue (yellow card) 90+3'	Report	Zaha (yellow card) 38'; Tomkins (yellow card) 72'	Stadium: Vicarage Road; Attendance: 20,070; Referee: Martin Atkinson

16 December 2019 17	Crystal Palace	1–1	Brighton & Hove Albion	Selhurst
19:45 GMT	Benteke (yellow card) 35'; Zaha 76'	Report	Maupay 54'; Pröpper (yellow card) 86'	Stadium: Selhurst Park; Attendance: 24,175; Referee: Craig Pawson

21 December 2019 18	Newcastle United	1–0	Crystal Palace	Newcastle
15:00 GMT	Almirón 83', (yellow card) 83'; Schär (yellow card) 87'	Report		Stadium: St. James' Park; Attendance: 45,453; Referee: Simon Hooper

26 December 2019 19	Crystal Palace	2–1	West Ham United	Selhurst
15:00 GMT	Kouyate 68'; Ayew 90'	Report	Snodgrass 57'; Zabaleta (yellow card) 89'; Cresswell (yellow card) 90+3'	Stadium: Selhurst Park; Attendance: 25,462; Referee: Andre Marriner

28 December 2019 20	Southampton	1–1	Crystal Palace	Southampton
15:00 GMT	Ings 74'; Ward-Prowse (yellow card) 79'	Report	Milivojević (yellow card) 32'; Tomkins 50'; McArthur (yellow card) 85'	Stadium: St Mary's Stadium; Attendance: 31,108; Referee: Andrew Madley

1 January 2020 21	Norwich City	1–1	Crystal Palace	Norwich
17:30 GMT	Cantwell 4'; Zimmermann (yellow card) 42'; Aarons (yellow card) 74'; Hanley (yellow card) 76'; Stiepermann (yellow card) 83'; Tettey (yellow card) 89'	Report	Wickham 85'	Stadium: Carrow Road; Attendance: 27,021; Referee: Jonathan Moss

11 January 2020 22	Crystal Palace	1–1	Arsenal	Selhurst
12:30 GMT	Ayew 54'; McCarthy (yellow card) 71'; Tomkins (yellow card) 85'	Report	Aubameyang 12', (red card) 67'; Pépé (yellow card) 44'; Maitland-Niles (yellow card) 51'; Lacazette (yellow card) 90'	Stadium: Selhurst Park; Referee: Paul Tierney

18 January 2020 23	Manchester City	2–2	Crystal Palace	Manchester
15:00 GMT	Mendy (yellow card) 58'; Agüero 82', 87'	Report	McArthur (yellow card) 13'; Ayew (yellow card) 26'; Tosun 39'; Fernandinho 90' (o.g.)	Stadium: City of Manchester Stadium; Attendance: 54,439; Referee: Graham Scott

21 January 2020 24	Crystal Palace	0–2	Southampton	Selhurst
19:30 GMT	Tomkins (yellow card) 74'	Report	Redmond 22', (yellow card) 74'; Armstrong 48'; Romeu (yellow card) 71'	Stadium: Selhurst Park; Attendance: 23,739; Referee: Andre Marriner

1 February 2020 25	Crystal Palace	0–1	Sheffield United	Selhurst
15:00 GMT	Tomkins (yellow card) 24'; Milivojević (yellow card) 67'; Ward (yellow card) 74'	Report	Baldock (yellow card) 18'; Guaita 58' (o.g.); Fleck (yellow card) 68'	Stadium: Selhurst Park; Attendance: 25,170; Referee: Andrew Madley

8 February 2020 26	Everton	3–1	Crystal Palace	Liverpool
12:30 GMT	Bernard 18'; Richarlison 58'; Calvert-Lewin 88'	Report	McCarthy (yellow card) 10'; Benteke 51'	Stadium: Goodison Park; Attendance: 38,987; Referee: David Coote

22 February 2020 27	Crystal Palace	1–0	Newcastle United	Selhurst
15:00 GMT	McCarthy (yellow card) 14'; Van Aanholt 44'; McArthur (yellow card) 74'	Report	Bentaleb (yellow card) 21'; Almirón (yellow card) 32'; Lascelles (yellow card) 39'; Ritchie (yellow card) 83'; Joelinton (yellow card) 88'; Lazaro (red card) 90+5'; Longstaff (yellow card) 90+6'	Stadium: Selhurst Park; Attendance: 25,486; Referee: Peter Bankes

29 February 2020 28	Brighton & Hove Albion	0–1	Crystal Palace	Falmer
12:30 GMT	Schelotto (yellow card) 27'; Montoya (yellow card) 57'	Report	Benteke (yellow card) 33'; Ayew 70'	Stadium: Falmer Stadium; Attendance: 30,124; Referee: Martin Atkinson

7 March 2020 29	Crystal Palace	1–0	Watford	Selhurst
15:00 GMT	Ayew 28', (yellow card) 90+4'; Zaha (yellow card) 41'; Kouyaté (yellow card) 50'; Benteke (yellow card) 59'	Report	Kiko (yellow card) 31'; Capoue (yellow card) 50'; Doucouré (yellow card) 52'; Pussetto (yellow card) 85'	Stadium: Selhurst Park; Attendance: 25,461; Referee: Anthony Taylor

20 June 2020 30	Bournemouth	0–2	Crystal Palace	Bournemouth
19:45 BST	Smith (yellow card) 45+2'; L. Cook (yellow card) 67'; S. Cook (yellow card) 87'	Report	Milivojević 12'; Ayew 23', (yellow card) 45'; Ward (yellow card) 71'	Stadium: Vitality Stadium; Attendance: 0 Referee: Stuart Attwell
Note: This match was originally scheduled to be played on 14 March, but was postponed on 13 March due to concerns over the coronavirus pandemic.

24 June 2020 31	Liverpool	4–0	Crystal Palace	Liverpool
20:15 BST	Alexander-Arnold 23'; Salah 44'; Fabinho 55'; Mané 69'	Report		Stadium: Anfield; Attendance: 0 Referee: Martin Atkinson
Note: This match was originally scheduled to be played on 21 March, but was postponed on 13 March due to concerns over the coronavirus pandemic.

29 June 2020 32	Crystal Palace	0–1	Burnley	Selhurst
20:00 BST	McCarthy (yellow card) 61'	Report	Tarkowski (yellow card) 58'; Mee 62'	Stadium: Selhurst Park; Attendance: 0 Referee: Simon Hooper
Note: This match was originally scheduled to be played on 4 April, but was postponed on 13 March due to concerns over the coronavirus pandemic.

4 July 2020 33	Leicester City	3–0	Crystal Palace	Leicester
15:00 BST	Chilwell (yellow card) 45+3'; Iheanacho 49'; Albrighton (yellow card) 50'; Vardy 77', 90+4'	Report	McArthur (yellow card) 57'	Stadium: King Power Stadium; Attendance: 0 Referee: Jonathan Moss
Note: This match was originally scheduled to be played on 11 April, but was postponed on 13 March due to concerns over the coronavirus pandemic, and later rescheduled to 4 July.

7 July 2020 34	Crystal Palace	2–3	Chelsea	Selhurst
18:00 BST	Zaha 34'; Milivojević (yellow card) 35'; Benteke 72'	Report	Giroud 6'; Pulisic 27'; Abraham 71'	Stadium: Selhurst Park; Attendance: 0 Referee: David Coote
Note: This match was originally scheduled to be played on 18 April, but was postponed on 3 April due to concerns over the coronavirus pandemic, and later rescheduled to 7 July.

12 July 2020 35	Aston Villa	2–0	Crystal Palace	Aston
14:15 BST	Mings (yellow card) 27'; Trézéguet 45+4', 59'; Douglas Luiz (yellow card) 90+1'	Report	Zaha (yellow card) 27'; Sakho (yellow card) 27'; Kouyaté (yellow card) 54'; Milivojević (yellow card) 67'; Benteke (red card) 90+6'	Stadium: Villa Park; Attendance: 0 Referee: Martin Atkinson
Note: This match was originally scheduled to be played on 27 April, but was postponed on 3 April due to concerns over the coronavirus pandemic, and later rescheduled to 12 July.

16 July 2020 36	Crystal Palace	0–2	Manchester United	Selhurst
20:15 BST	Milivojević (yellow card) 90+3'	Report	Wan-Bissaka (yellow card) 36'; Rashford 45+1'; Maguire (yellow card) 65'; Martial 78'	Stadium: Selhurst Park; Attendance: 0 Referee: Graham Scott
Note: This match was originally scheduled to be played on 2 May, but was postponed on 3 April due to concerns over the coronavirus pandemic, and later rescheduled to 16 July.

20 July 2020 37	Wolverhampton Wanderers	2–0	Crystal Palace	Wolverhampton
20:15 BST	Podence 41'; Coady (yellow card) 65'; Jonny 68'; Traoré (yellow card) 78'	Report	McCarthy (yellow card) 64'	Stadium: Molineux Stadium; Attendance: 0 Referee: Peter Bankes
Note: This match was originally scheduled to be played on 9 May, but was postponed on 3 April due to concerns over the coronavirus pandemic, and later rescheduled to 20 July.

26 July 2020 38	Crystal Palace	1–1	Tottenham Hotspur	Selhurst
16:00 BST	McCarthy (yellow card) 17'; Mitchell (yellow card) 49'; Schlupp 53'; Kouyaté (yellow card) 75'	Report	Kane 13'; Alderweireld (yellow card) 61'; Dier (yellow card) 90+1'	Stadium: Selhurst Park; Attendance: 0 Referee: Andre Marriner
Note: This match was originally scheduled to be played on 17 May, but was postponed on 3 April due to concerns over the coronavirus pandemic, and later rescheduled to 26 July.

=== FA Cup ===
Crystal Palace entered the FA Cup in the third round, in early January 2020, along with the other 19 Premier League teams. They were drawn at home to Championship team Derby County, and lost the game by a single goal.

5 January 2020 Third round	Crystal Palace	0–1	Derby County	Selhurst
14:01 GMT	Milivojević (red card) 63'	Report	Martin 32'; Huddlestone (yellow card) 64'; Malone (yellow card) 90+6'	Stadium: Selhurst Park; Attendance: 15,507; Referee: Michael Oliver

=== EFL Cup ===
The second round draw was made on 13 August 2019 following the conclusion of all but one first-round matches. Palace were drawn at home against Colchester United, and, after a goal-less game, were knocked out in a penalty shoot-out.

27 August 2019 Second round	Crystal Palace	0–0 (4–5 p)	Colchester United	Selhurst
19:45 BST		Report		Stadium: Selhurst Park; Attendance: 8,898; Referee: Andy Woolmer
	Penalties
	Townsend (penalty missed); Ayew (penalty scored); Benteke (penalty scored); Camarasa (penalty scored); Zaha (penalty scored)		(penalty scored) Norris; (penalty scored) Nouble; (penalty scored) Brown; (penalty scored) Cowan-Hall; (penalty scored) Chilvers

== Players ==
=== First-team squad ===
As of 20 June 2020

Note: Flags indicate national team as defined under FIFA eligibility rules; some limited exceptions apply. Players may hold more than one non-FIFA nationality.

No.	Pos.	Nation	Player
2	DF	ENG	Joel Ward
3	DF	NED	Patrick van Aanholt
4	MF	SRB	Luka Milivojević (Captain)
5	DF	ENG	James Tomkins
6	DF	ENG	Scott Dann
7	MF	GER	Max Meyer
8	MF	SEN	Cheikhou Kouyaté
9	FW	GHA	Jordan Ayew
10	FW	ENG	Andros Townsend
11	FW	CIV	Wilfried Zaha
12	DF	FRA	Mamadou Sakho
13	GK	WAL	Wayne Hennessey
15	DF	GHA	Jeffrey Schlupp

No.	Pos.	Nation	Player
17	FW	BEL	Christian Benteke
18	MF	SCO	James McArthur
19	GK	IRL	Stephen Henderson
22	MF	IRL	James McCarthy
24	DF	ENG	Gary Cahill
31	GK	ESP	Vicente Guaita
32	DF	CRO	Nikola Tavares
34	DF	ENG	Martin Kelly
35	DF	ENG	Sam Woods
39	DF	ENG	Tyrick Mitchell
40	MF	ENG	Brandon Pierrick
44	MF	NED	Jaïro Riedewald

== Player statistics ==
=== Appearances and goals ===
As of 27 July 2020

No.	Pos	Nat	Player	Total		Premier League		FA Cup		League Cup	
No.	Pos	Nat	Player	Apps	Goals	Apps	Goals	Apps	Goals	Apps	Goals
Goalkeepers
13	GK	(Wales) WAL	Wayne Hennessey	5	0	3	0	1	0	1	0
19	GK	(Republic of Ireland) IRL	Stephen Henderson	0	0	0	0	0	0	0	0
31	GK	(Spain) ESP	Vicente Guaita	35	0	35	0	0	0	0	0
Defenders
2	DF	(England) ENG	Joel Ward	29	0	27+2	0	0	0	0	0
3	DF	(Netherlands) NED	Patrick van Aanholt	29	3	29	3	0	0	0	0
5	DF	(England) ENG	James Tomkins	19	1	18	1	0+1	0	0	0
6	DF	(England) ENG	Scott Dann	17	0	14+2	0	0	0	1	0
12	DF	(France) FRA	Mamadou Sakho	14	0	11+3	0	0	0	0	0
24	DF	(England) ENG	Gary Cahill	27	0	25	0	1	0	0+1	0
34	DF	(England) ENG	Martin Kelly	21	0	17+2	0	1	0	1	0
35	DF	(England) ENG	Sam Woods	2	0	0	0	0+1	0	1	0
39	DF	(England) ENG	Tyrick Mitchell	4	0	2+2	0	0	0	0	0
Midfielders
4	MF	(Serbia) SRB	Luka Milivojević	32	3	28+3	3	1	0	0	0
7	MF	(Germany) GER	Max Meyer	19	0	6+11	0	1	0	1	0
8	MF	(Senegal) SEN	Cheikhou Kouyaté	36	1	29+6	1	1	0	0	0
10	MF	(England) ENG	Andros Townsend	25	1	14+10	1	0	0	1	0
15	MF	(Ghana) GHA	Jeffrey Schlupp	17	3	11+6	3	0	0	0	0
18	MF	(Scotland) SCO	James McArthur	38	0	37	0	0+1	0	0	0
22	MF	(Republic of Ireland) IRL	James McCarthy	35	0	16+17	0	1	0	1	0
40	MF	(England) ENG	Brandon Pierrick	3	0	0+2	0	1	0	0	0
44	MF	(Netherlands) NED	Jaïro Riedewald	19	0	7+10	0	1	0	1	0
Forwards
9	FW	(Ghana) GHA	Jordan Ayew	39	9	37	9	1	0	0+1	0
11	FW	(Ivory Coast) CIV	Wilfried Zaha	39	4	37+1	4	0	0	0+1	0
17	FW	(Belgium) BEL	Christian Benteke	25	2	13+11	2	0	0	1	0
21	FW	(England) ENG	Connor Wickham	8	1	0+6	1	1	0	1	0
Players who left the club during the season
20	FW	(Turkey) TUR	Cenk Tosun	5	1	2+3	1	0	0	0	0
23	MF	(Spain) ESP	Víctor Camarasa	2	0	0+1	0	0	0	1	0

=== Goalscorers ===
As of 27 July 2020

No.	Pos.	Name	Premier League	FA Cup	League Cup	Total
9	FW	Jordan Ayew	9	0	0	9
11	FW	Wilfried Zaha	4	0	0	4
3	DF	Patrick van Aanholt	3	0	0	3
4	MF	Luka Milivojević	3	0	0	3
15	MF	Jeffrey Schlupp	3	0	0	3
17	FW	Christian Benteke	2	0	0	2
5	DF	James Tomkins	1	0	0	1
8	MF	Cheikhou Kouyaté	1	0	0	1
10	MF	Andros Townsend	1	0	0	1
20	FW	Cenk Tosun	1	0	0	1
21	FW	Connor Wickham	1	0	0	1
—		Own goal	2	0	0	2
Total			29	0	0	29

=== Disciplinary record ===
As of 27 July 2020

No.	Pos.	Name	Premier League		FA Cup		League Cup		Total	
No.	Pos.	Name	Booked	Sent off (straight red)	Booked	Sent off (straight red)	Booked	Sent off (straight red)	Booked	Sent off (straight red)
4	MF	Luka Milivojević	12	0	0	1	0	0	12	1
22	MF	James McCarthy	8	0	0	0	0	0	8	0
18	MF	James McArthur	7	0	0	0	0	0	7	0
9	FW	Jordan Ayew	6	0	0	0	0	0	6	0
5	DF	James Tomkins	5	0	0	0	0	0	5	0
11	FW	Wilfried Zaha	5	0	0	0	0	0	5	0
17	FW	Christian Benteke	4	1	0	0	0	0	4	1
2	DF	Joel Ward	4	0	0	0	0	0	4	0
8	MF	Cheikhou Kouyaté	4	0	0	0	0	0	4	0
12	DF	Mamadou Sakho	1	1	0	0	0	0	1	1
15	MF	Jeffrey Schlupp	2	0	0	0	0	0	2	0
24	DF	Gary Cahill	1	0	0	0	1	0	2	0
7	MF	Max Meyer	1	0	0	0	0	0	1	0
31	GK	Vicente Guaita	1	0	0	0	0	0	1	0
39	DF	Tyrick Mitchell	1	0	0	0	0	0	0	0
Total			62	2	0	1	1	0	63	3

== Transfers ==
=== Transfers in ===
Date from	Position	Nationality	Name	From	Fee	Ref.
6 July 2019	GK	(Republic of Ireland)	Stephen Henderson	Nottingham Forest	Free transfer	
25 July 2019	CF	(Ghana)	Jordan Ayew	Swansea City	£2.5M	
5 August 2019	CB	(England)	Gary Cahill	Chelsea	Free transfer	
7 August 2019	CM	(Republic of Ireland)	James McCarthy	Everton	Undisclosed	
22 January 2020	MF	(Scotland)	Scott Banks	Dundee United	Undisclosed	
3 February 2020	CB	(Australia)	Jay Rich-Baghuelou	Welling United	Undisclosed	
21 July 2020	FB	(England)	Nathan Ferguson	Free agent (Note: Ferguson's previous contract at West Bromwich Albion expired. Though he was a free agent, a tribunal will decide if a fee is necessary, due to his age)	Tribunal	

=== Loans in ===
Start date	Position	Nationality	Name	From	End date	Ref.
7 August 2019	CM	(Spain)	Víctor Camarasa	(Spain) Real Betis	13 January 2020 (Note: Camarasa initially joined on loan for the whole season, but in January 2020 he joined Deportivo Alavés for the remainder of the season)	
10 January 2020	CF	(Turkey)	Cenk Tosun	Everton	30 June 2020	

=== Transfers out ===
Date from	Position	Nationality	Name	To	Fee	Ref.
1 July 2019	LB	(England)	Tyler Brown	Free agent	Released	
1 July 2019	MF	(Chinese Taipei)	Will Donkin	Free agent (Note: Following his release, Donkin joined Stabæk Fotball)	Released	
1 July 2019	DM	(Nepal)	Bivesh Gurung	Free agent (Note: Following his release, Gurung joined Trysil)	Released	
1 July 2019	LB	(England)	Joseph Hungbo	Free agent (Note: Following his release, Hungbo joined Watford)	Released	
1 July 2019	LW	(England)	Levi Lumeka	(Portugal) Varzim	Free transfer	
1 July 2019	CB	(England)	Oliver O'Dwyer	Free agent (Note: Following his release, O'Dwyer joined Aldershot Town)	Released	
1 July 2019	CM	(England)	Jason Puncheon	Free agent (Note: Following his release, Puncheon joined Pafos.)	Released	
1 July 2019	CM	(Mali)	Bakary Sako	Free agent (Note: Following his release, Sako joined Denizlispor)	Released	
1 July 2019	LB	(Senegal)	Pape Souaré	Free agent (Note: Following his release, Souaré joined Troyes)	Released	
1 July 2019	GK	(Argentina)	Julián Speroni	Free agent	Released	
1 July 2019	RB	(England)	Aaron Wan-Bissaka	Manchester United	£50,000,000	
31 January 2020	FW	(England)	James Daly	Bristol Rovers	Undisclosed	
1 July 2020	GK	(England)	Dion-Curtis Henry	Free agent	Released	
1 July 2020	MF	(Republic of Ireland)	Kian Flanagan	Free agent	Released	
1 July 2020	RW	(Democratic Republic of the Congo)	Jason Lokilo	Free agent (Note: Following his release, Lokilo joined Doncaster Rovers, where he had spent time on loan during the season.)	Released	
1 July 2020	CB	(England)	Jacob Mensah	Free agent	Released	
1 July 2020	GK	(England)	Joe Tupper	Free agent (Note: Following his release, Tupper joined Havant & Waterlooville)	Released	

=== Loans out ===
Start date	Position	Nationality	Name	To	End date	Ref.
4 August 2019	CF	(Norway)	Alexander Sørloth	(Turkey) Trabzonspor	End of 20–21 season	
23 August 2019	CB	(England)	Ryan Inniss	(Wales) Newport County	End of season	
31 August 2019	CB	(Poland)	Jarosław Jach	(Poland) Raków Częstochowa	End of season	
6 September 2019	GK	(England)	Joe Tupper	Margate	End of season	
22 January 2020	CB	(England)	Sam Woods	(Scotland) Hamilton Academical	End of season	
31 January 2020	AM	(Scotland)	Scott Banks	(Scotland) Alloa Athletic	End of season	
31 January 2020	GK	(England)	Dion-Curtis Henry	Hampton & Richmond Borough	End of season	
31 January 2020	RW	(Democratic Republic of the Congo)	Jason Lokilo	Doncaster Rovers	30 June 2020	
31 January 2020	MF	(England)	Giovanni McGregor	Dartford	End of season	
31 January 2020	CF	(England)	Connor Wickham	Sheffield Wednesday	End of season	
