= 2020–21 Crystal Palace F.C. season =

English football club season

Crystal Palace F.C.
2020–21 season
- Owners: Steve Parish; Josh Harris; David Blitzer
- Chairman: Steve Parish
- Manager: Roy Hodgson
- Stadium: Selhurst Park
- Premier League: 14th
- FA Cup: Third round (eliminated by Wolverhampton Wanderers)
- EFL Cup: Second round (eliminated by Bournemouth)
- Top goalscorer: League: Wilfried Zaha (11); All: Wilfried Zaha (11)
Home colours	Away colours	Third colours

The 2020–21 season was Crystal Palace's eighth consecutive season in the Premier League (extending their longest ever spell in the top division of English football) and the 115th year in their history. This season, Palace participated in the Premier League, FA Cup and EFL Cup. The season covered the period from 27 July 2020 to 30 June 2021. Palace finished the season in fourteenth place which also saw the departure of manager Roy Hodgson upon the expiration of his contract.

== Season summary ==
=== September ===
Crystal Palace started the Premier League season strongly, with Wilfried Zaha scoring his 50th league goal to give Palace a 1–0 home win over Southampton. However, in the Carabao Cup second round, Bournemouth edged Palace in an epic penalty shootout (which finished 11–10) after a 0–0 draw. The defeat did not knock confidence however, as in the next game, Palace won 3–1 against Manchester United, with Wilfried Zaha scoring a brace against his former club. Palace suffered their first league defeat to end off the month, with Dominic Calvert-Lewin scoring in a 2–1 win for Everton.

=== October ===
Palace started October dreadfully, with Ben Chilwell scoring and assisting on debut for Chelsea in a 4–0 defeat. The next game was derby-day against Brighton & Hove Albion, with Alexis Mac Allister scoring a late equaliser for the Seagulls just before their captain Lewis Dunk was sent off. Palace got back to winning ways with Jairo Riedewald and Wilfried Zaha scoring in a 2–1 away win against Fulham, who had Aboubakar Kamara sent off late on. However, the good form was short-lived, as Palace fell to a 2–0 away defeat against Wolverhampton Wanderers, where Rayan Aït-Nouri scored and Palace captain Luka Milivojevic was sent off in the closing minutes.

=== November ===
Palace started November strongly once more, with Eberechi Eze assisting and scoring once in a 4–1 win over Leeds United. Once again, the good form was short-lived, as Palace were defeated 1–0 by Burnley, with Chris Wood scoring the only goal. The next game increased the woes, as Callum Wilson and Joelinton scored late on to stun Roy Hodgson’s side in a 2–0 loss to Newcastle United.

=== December ===
In a trend similar to previous months, Palace started very well with a 5–1 away win over West Bromwich Albion, Wilfried Zaha scoring twice and providing an assist after Matheus Pereira’s red card. However, the good form did not drop off, as the first game at Selhurst Park with fans since 7 March was a 1–1 draw with league leaders Tottenham Hotspur, with Vicente Guaita making superb saves to deny Tanguy Ndombele, Eric Dier, and Harry Kane twice. The next game also ended 1–1, against West Ham United, however it was Palace's turn to drop points after Sebastien Haller’s bicycle kick. History was made in the next game, as for the first time in their history Palace conceded 7 goals at home, to Liverpool. The next game wasn't much better, Anwar El Ghazi scoring a stunning goal in a 3–0 away loss at 10-man Aston Villa. However, some form of consolation came at the end of the month, with Vicente Guaita saving Kelechi Iheanacho’s penalty early on against Leicester City, but joy was short-lived, as Harvey Barnes scored a late equaliser. The game finished 1–1.

=== January ===
Palace started 2021 with a bang, as Eberechi Eze scored a stunning goal, running 60–70 yards and shooting into the bottom right corner, in a 2–0 home win over Sheffield United. However, in the FA Cup, Palace lost 1–0 to Wolves with Adama Traoré scoring the only goal. Palace had their first goalless draw of the season, against Arsenal, 5 days later, but that same week the suffers a 4–0 defeat away to Manchester City, with John Stones scoring a brace. The next game wasn't an improvement, as it was Tomas Soucek's turn to score a brace, in a 3–2 home loss to West Ham United. The next game was at home to Wolves, Palace gainining revenge for their FA Cup defeat, as Eze scored the only goal of the game to seal a 1–0 win.

=== February ===
Palace started the month by beating Newcastle 2–1 away, Gary Cahill scored the winner after Jonjo Shelvey & Jairo Riedewald traded long-range strikes. In the next game the Eagles suffered a 2–0 away loss at Leeds United, with former Eagles loanee Patrick Bamford scoring his 100th career goal. After Palace had returned home from their trip to Yorkshire, they were welcomed by a 3–0 home loss to Burnley, with Matt Lowton scoring a superb volley. The next game was against rivals Brighton, with Christian Benteke stunning the opposition with a stoppage-time winner. The month ended with a 0–0 home draw with Fulham.

=== March ===
March started as February ended, this time with Palace frustrating Manchester United at home in a 0–0 draw. The next game saw Palace beaten 4–1 by Tottenham Hotspur, with Harry Kane scoring a brace and providing two assists for Gareth Bale. Palace got back to winning ways in the middle of the month, with a Luka Milivojević penalty wrapping up a 1–0 home win over West Bromwich Albion.

=== April ===
After a three-week break, Michy Batshuayi smashed in a late equaliser in a 1–1 draw away at Everton. Despite keeping 3 clean sheets at home in a row, Christian Pulisic’s brace ended that run in a 4–1 home loss to Chelsea. After yet another international break, Kelechi Iheanacho scored a stunning goal in a 2–1 away loss at Leicester City, despite Palace going 1–0 up early on.

=== May ===
Palace started the month with a 2–0 home loss to soon-to-be champions Manchester City, in which Sergio Aguero and Ferran Torres scored. The next game was at already-relegated Sheffield United’s home ground, Bramall Lane. Christian Benteke and Eberechi Eze scored the goals in a 2-0 Palace win. A disappointing away day in midweek saw Danny Ings score twice in a 3–1 away loss at Southampton. The penultimate home game of the season came against Aston Villa F.C., with Palace coming back from 1–0 and 2–1 down to win 3–2. The long-awaited return of fans came against Arsenal, with Nicolas Pépé scoring twice in a disappointing 3–1 home defeat, however it was vital for Arsenal as it increased their faint hopes of qualifying for the Europa Conference League. The season ended with Sadio Mané scoring twice for Liverpool in a 2–0 away loss at Anfield. Palace ended the season in fourteenth place, which also saw the departure of manager Roy Hodgson upon the expiration of his contract.

== Pre-season friendlies ==
Win Draw Loss Fixtures

25 August 2020 Friendly	Crystal Palace	2–1	Oxford United	Selhurst
17:30 BST	Zaha 51'; McArthur 54'	Report	Brannagan 12'	Stadium: Selhurst Park; Attendance: 0

29 August 2020 Friendly	Crystal Palace	3–0	Charlton Athletic	Selhurst
14:00 BST	Ayew 63', 67'; Zaha 88'	Report		Stadium: Selhurst Park; Attendance: 0

1 September 2020 Friendly	Millwall	0–1	Crystal Palace	Bermondsey
14:00 BST		Report	Meyer 28'	Stadium: The Den; Attendance: 0 Referee: Tim Robinson

5 September 2020 Friendly	Crystal Palace	1–1	Brøndby IF	Selhurst
15:00 BST	Zaha 35'	Report	Lindstrøm 70'	Stadium: Selhurst Park; Attendance: 0

== Competitions ==
=== Overview ===
Competition	First match	Last match	Starting round	Final position	Record							
Competition	First match	Last match	Starting round	Final position	Pld	W	D	L	GF	GA	GD	Win %
Premier League	12 September 2020	23 May 2021	Matchday 1	14th	38	12	8	18	41	66	−25	31.58
FA Cup	8 January 2021	8 January 2021	Third round	Third round	1	0	0	1	0	1	−1	0.00
EFL Cup	15 September 2020	15 September 2020	Second round	Second round	1	0	1	0	0	0	+0	0.00
Total					40	12	9	19	41	67	−26	30.00

Last updated: 23 May 2021
Source: Soccerway

=== Premier League ===
==== League table ====
Pos	Team	Pld	W	D	L	GF	GA	GD	Pts
12	Newcastle United	38	12	9	17	46	62	−16	45
13	Wolverhampton Wanderers	38	12	9	17	36	52	−16	45
14	Crystal Palace	38	12	8	18	41	66	−25	44
15	Southampton	38	12	7	19	47	68	−21	43
16	Brighton & Hove Albion	38	9	14	15	40	46	−6	41

Source: Premier League
Rules for classification: 1) Points; 2) Goal difference; 3) Goals scored; 4) If the champions, relegated teams or qualified teams for UEFA competitions cannot be determined by rules 1 to 3, rules 4.1 to 4.3 are applied – 4.1) Points gained in head-to-head record between such teams; 4.2) Away goals scored in head-to-head record between such teams; 4.3) Play-offs

==== Results summary ====
Overall								Home						Away					
Pld	W	D	L	GF	GA	GD	Pts	W	D	L	GF	GA	GD	W	D	L	GF	GA	GD
38	12	8	18	41	66	−25	44	6	5	8	20	32	−12	6	3	10	21	34	−13

Last updated: 23 May 2021.
Source: Premier League

==== Results by matchday ====
Matchday	1	2	3	4	5	6	7	8	9	10	11	12	13	14	15	16	17	18	19	20	21	22	23	24	25	26	27	28	29	30	31	32	33	34	35	36	37	38
Ground	H	A	H	A	H	A	A	H	A	H	A	H	A	H	A	H	H	A	A	H	H	A	A	H	A	H	H	A	H	A	H	A	H	A	A	H	H	A
Result	W	W	L	L	D	W	L	W	L	L	W	D	D	L	L	D	W	D	L	L	W	W	L	L	W	D	D	L	W	D	L	L	L	W	L	W	L	L
Position	7	5	6	13	14	8	13	8	11	15	11	11	12	13	14	15	14	13	13	14	13	13	13	14	13	13	13	13	12	12	13	13	13	13	13	13	13	14

Updated to match(es) played on 23 May 2021. Source: Premier League
A = Away; H = Home; W = Win; D = Draw; L = Loss

==== Matches ====
The 2020–21 season fixtures were released on 20 August.

12 September 2020 1	Crystal Palace	1–0	Southampton	Selhurst
15:00 BST	Zaha 13'; Schlupp (yellow card) 41'; McCarthy (yellow card) 58'	Report	Walker-Peters (yellow card) 51'	Stadium: Selhurst Park; Attendance: 0 Referee: Jonathan Moss

19 September 2020 2	Manchester United	1–3	Crystal Palace	Manchester
17:30 BST	Fosu-Mensah (yellow card) 58'; Maguire (yellow card) 64'; Van de Beek 80'	Report	Townsend 7'; Ward (yellow card) 55'; Zaha 74' (pen.), 85'	Stadium: Old Trafford; Attendance: 0 Referee: Martin Atkinson

26 September 2020 3	Crystal Palace	1–2	Everton	Selhurst
15:00 BST	Zaha (yellow card) 23'; Kouyaté 26'; McArthur (yellow card) 45+3'; Ward (yellow card) 58'	Report	Calvert-Lewin 10'; Richarlison 40' (pen.), (yellow card) 60'	Stadium: Selhurst Park; Attendance: 0 Referee: Kevin Friend

3 October 2020 4	Chelsea	4–0	Crystal Palace	London
12:30 BST	Chilwell 50'; Azpilicueta (yellow card) 64'; Zouma 66'; Kanté (yellow card) 70'; Jorginho 78' (pen.), 82' (pen.)	Report		Stadium: Stamford Bridge; Attendance: 0 Referee: Michael Oliver

18 October 2020 5	Crystal Palace	1–1	Brighton & Hove Albion	Selhurst
14:00 BST	Zaha 19' (pen.); Mitchell (yellow card) 63'; Guaita (yellow card) 76'; McArthur (yellow card) 87'	Report	Ryan (yellow card) 18'; Bissouma (yellow card) 43'; Mac Allister 90'; Dunk (red card) 90+4'	Stadium: Selhurst Park; Attendance: 0 Referee: Stuart Attwell

24 October 2020 6	Fulham	1–2	Crystal Palace	Fulham
15:00 BST	Kamara (red card) 88'; Cairney 90+5'	Report	Riedewald 8'; Zaha 64'; Guaita (yellow card) 90+7'	Stadium: Craven Cottage; Attendance: 0 Referee: Graham Scott

30 October 2020 7	Wolverhampton Wanderers	2–0	Crystal Palace	Wolverhampton
20:00 GMT	Aït-Nouri 18'; Podence 27'	Report	Van Aanholt (yellow card) 45'; Zaha (yellow card) 62'; Milivojević (red card) 86'	Stadium: Molineux; Attendance: 0 Referee: Martin Atkinson

7 November 2020 8	Crystal Palace	4–1	Leeds United	Selhurst
15:00 GMT	Dann 12'; Eze 22'; Costa 42' (o.g.); Ayew 70'	Report	Bamford 27'; Cooper (yellow card) 49'; Klich (yellow card) 77'	Stadium: Selhurst Park; Attendance: 0 Referee: Chris Kavanagh

23 November 2020 9	Burnley	1–0	Crystal Palace	Burnley
17:30 GMT	Wood 8'; Rodriguez (yellow card) 79'; Lowton (yellow card) 86'	Report		Stadium: Turf Moor; Attendance: 0 Referee: Kevin Friend

27 November 2020 10	Crystal Palace	0–2	Newcastle United	Selhurst
20:00 GMT	Dann (yellow card) 78'; Schlupp (yellow card) 90+3'	Report	Fernández (yellow card) 17'; Longstaff (yellow card) 60'; Wilson 88'; Joelinton 90'	Stadium: Selhurst Park; Attendance: 0 Referee: Graham Scott

6 December 2020 11	West Bromwich Albion	1–5	Crystal Palace	West Bromwich
12:00 GMT	Sawyers (yellow card) 17'; Gallagher 30', (yellow card) 58'; Pereira (red card) 34'	Report	Furlong 8' (o.g.); McArthur (yellow card) 50'; Zaha 55', 68'; Benteke 59', 82'; Milivojević (yellow card) 88'	Stadium: The Hawthorns; Attendance: 0 Referee: Paul Tierney

13 December 2020 12	Crystal Palace	1–1	Tottenham Hotspur	Selhurst
14:15 GMT	Milivojević (yellow card) 20'; Schlupp 81'	Report	Kane 23'; Sissoko (yellow card) 38'	Stadium: Selhurst Park; Attendance: 2,000; Referee: Kevin Friend

16 December 2020 13	West Ham United	1–1	Crystal Palace	Stratford
20:00 GMT	Haller 55'	Report	Benteke (yellow card) 31' (yellow-red card) 70', (goal) 34'; Milivojević (yellow card) 75'	Stadium: London Stadium; Attendance: 0 Referee: David Coote

19 December 2020 14	Crystal Palace	0–7	Liverpool	Selhurst
12:30 GMT	Clyne (yellow card) 45+1'	Report	Minamino 3'; Mané 35'; Firmino 44', 68'; Henderson 52'; Salah 81', 84'	Stadium: Selhurst Park; Attendance: 0 Referee: Jonathan Moss

26 December 2020 15	Aston Villa	3–0	Crystal Palace	Aston
15:00 GMT	Traoré 5'; Mings (yellow card) 39' (yellow-red card) 45'; Hause 66'; El Ghazi 76'	Report	Zaha (yellow card) 39'; Milivojević (yellow card) 56'; Ward (yellow card) 68'; Eze (yellow card) 83'	Stadium: Villa Park; Attendance: 0 Referee: Anthony Taylor

28 December 2020 16	Crystal Palace	1–1	Leicester City	Selhurst
15:00 GMT	Zaha 58'	Report	Iheanacho (penalty missed) 19'; Choudhury (yellow card) 51'; Barnes 83'	Stadium: Selhurst Park; Attendance: 0 Referee: Graham Scott

2 January 2021 17	Crystal Palace	2–0	Sheffield United	Selhurst
15:00 GMT	Schlupp 4'; Eze 45+6', (yellow card) 67'	Report	Bogle (yellow card) 45+1'; Norwood (yellow card) 63'; Fleck (yellow card) 89'	Stadium: Selhurst Park; Attendance: 0 Referee: Stuart Attwell

14 January 2021 18	Arsenal	0–0	Crystal Palace	Holloway
20:00 GMT	David Luiz (yellow card) 67'	Report	Tomkins (yellow card) 42'	Stadium: Emirates Stadium; Attendance: 0 Referee: Andre Marriner

17 January 2021 19	Manchester City	4–0	Crystal Palace	Manchester
19:15 GMT	Stones 26', 68'; Gündoğan 56'; Sterling 88'	Report		Stadium: City of Manchester Stadium; Attendance: 0 Referee: Lee Mason

26 January 2021 20	Crystal Palace	2–3	West Ham United	Selhurst
18:00 GMT	Zaha 3'; Batshuayi 90+7'	Report	Souček 9', 25'; Dawson 65'	Stadium: Selhurst Park; Attendance: 0 Referee: Stuart Attwell

30 January 2021 21	Crystal Palace	1–0	Wolverhampton Wanderers	Selhurst
15:00 GMT	Eze 60'; Zaha (yellow card) 90'	Report	Kilman (yellow card) 84'; Coady (yellow card) 90'	Stadium: Selhurst Park; Attendance: 0 Referee: Simon Hooper

2 February 2021 22	Newcastle United	1–2	Crystal Palace	Newcastle upon Tyne
20:15 GMT	Shelvey 2', (yellow card) 29'	Report	Riedewald 21'; Cahill 25'; Clyne (yellow card) 51'; Milivojević (yellow card) 72'; Ayew (yellow card) 90+3'	Stadium: St James' Park; Attendance: 0 Referee: Darren England

8 February 2021 23	Leeds United	2–0	Crystal Palace	Leeds
20:00 GMT	Harrison 3'; Bamford 52'	Report	Cahill (yellow card) 37'; Milivojević (yellow card) 76'	Stadium: Elland Road; Attendance: 0 Referee: Andre Marriner

13 February 2021 24	Crystal Palace	0–3	Burnley	Selhurst
15:00 GMT		Report	Guðmundsson 5'; Rodriguez 10'; Lowton 47'	Stadium: Selhurst Park; Attendance: 0 Referee: Michael Oliver

22 February 2021 25	Brighton & Hove Albion	1–2	Crystal Palace	Falmer
20:00 GMT	Burn (yellow card) 53'; Veltman 55', (yellow card) 84'	Report	Mateta 28'; Benteke 90+5'	Stadium: Falmer Stadium; Attendance: 0 Referee: Kevin Friend

28 February 2021 26	Crystal Palace	0–0	Fulham	Selhurst
12:00 GMT	Milivojević (yellow card) 55'	Report	Robinson (yellow card) 83'	Stadium: Selhurst Park; Attendance: 0 Referee: Anthony Taylor

3 March 2021 27	Crystal Palace	0–0	Manchester United	Selhurst
20:15 GMT	Riedewald (yellow card) 90+3'	Report		Stadium: Selhurst Park; Attendance: 0 Referee: Andre Marriner

7 March 2021 28	Tottenham Hotspur	4–1	Crystal Palace	Tottenham
19:15 GMT	Bale 25', 49'; Kane 52', 77'; Doherty (yellow card) 90+1'; Carlos Vinícius (yellow card) 90+5'	Report	Ayew (yellow card) 29'; Cahill (yellow card) 35'; Benteke 45+1'; Riedewald (yellow card) 47'	Stadium: Tottenham Hotspur Stadium; Attendance: 0 Referee: Stuart Attwell

13 March 2021 29	Crystal Palace	1–0	West Bromwich Albion	Selhurst
15:00 GMT	Milivojević 37' (pen.); Eze (yellow card) 53'; Van Aanholt (yellow card) 90+1'; Cahill (yellow card) 90+3'	Report	Furlong (yellow card) 36'	Stadium: Selhurst Park; Attendance: 0 Referee: Simon Hooper

5 April 2021 30	Everton	1–1	Crystal Palace	Liverpool
18:00 BST	Mina (yellow card) 15'; Digne (yellow card) 33'; Rodríguez 56'	Report	Batshuayi 86'	Stadium: Goodison Park; Attendance: 0 Referee: Kevin Friend

10 April 2021 31	Crystal Palace	1–4	Chelsea	Selhurst
17:30 BST	Kouyaté (yellow card) 29'; Benteke 63'	Report	Havertz 8'; Pulisic 10', 78'; Zouma 30'	Stadium: Selhurst Park; Attendance: 0 Referee: Michael Oliver

26 April 2021 32	Leicester City	2–1	Crystal Palace	Leicester
20:00 BST	Castagne 50'; Iheanacho 80'	Report	Zaha 12'; Riedewald (yellow card) 18'	Stadium: King Power Stadium; Attendance: 0 Referee: Graham Scott

1 May 2021 33	Crystal Palace	0–2	Manchester City	Selhurst
12:30 BST	Milivojević (yellow card) 49'; Kouyaté (yellow card) 81'	Report	Agüero 57'; Torres 59'	Stadium: Selhurst Park; Attendance: 0 Referee: David Coote

8 May 2021 34	Sheffield United	0–2	Crystal Palace	Sheffield
15:00 BST	Norwood (yellow card) 38'	Report	Benteke 2'; Ward (yellow card) 30'; Eze 88'	Stadium: Bramall Lane; Attendance: 0 Referee: Simon Hooper

11 May 2021 35	Southampton	3–1	Crystal Palace	Southampton
20:15 BST	Ings 19', 75'; Bednarek (yellow card) 44'; Adams 48'; Vestergaard (yellow card) 55'	Report	Benteke 2'; Milivojević (penalty missed) 40'; Ayew (yellow card) 45+1'; Kouyaté (yellow card) 77'; Zaha (yellow card) 90+2'	Stadium: St Mary's Stadium; Attendance: 0 Referee: Andrew Madley

16 May 2021 36	Crystal Palace	3–2	Aston Villa	Selhurst
12:00 BST	Benteke 32'; Ward (yellow card) 73'; Zaha 75', (yellow card) 90+2'; Kouyaté (yellow card) 82'; Mitchell 84'	Report	McGinn 17', (yellow card) 50'; El Ghazi 34'; Hause (yellow card) 86'	Stadium: Selhurst Park; Attendance: 0 Referee: David Coote

19 May 2021 37	Crystal Palace	1–3	Arsenal	Selhurst
19:00 BST	Schlupp (yellow card) 5'; Benteke (yellow card) 37', (goal) 62'	Report	Pépé 35', 90+5'; Elneny (yellow card) 37'; Martinelli 90+1'	Stadium: Selhurst Park; Attendance: 6,500; Referee: Anthony Taylor

23 May 2021 38	Liverpool	2–0	Crystal Palace	Liverpool
16:00 BST	Mané 36', 74'; Alexander-Arnold (yellow card) 71'; Milner (yellow card) 86'	Report	Ayew (yellow card) 71'; Riedewald (yellow card) 83'	Stadium: Anfield; Attendance: 10,000; Referee: Craig Pawson

=== FA Cup ===
The third round draw was made on 30 November, with Premier League and EFL Championship clubs all entering the competition.

8 January 2021 Third round	Wolverhampton Wanderers	1–0	Crystal Palace	Wolverhampton
19:45 GMT	Traoré 35'; Aït-Nouri (yellow card) 66'; Gibbs-White (yellow card) 85'	Report	McCarthy (yellow card) 62'	Stadium: Molineux; Attendance: 0 Referee: David Coote

=== EFL Cup ===
The draw for both the second and third round were confirmed on 6 September, live on Sky Sports by Phil Babb.

15 September 2020 Second round	Bournemouth	0–0 (11–10 p)	Crystal Palace	Kings Park
19:45 BST		Report	Kelly (yellow card) 90+3'	Stadium: Vitality Stadium; Attendance: 0 Referee: Keith Stroud
	Penalties
	Brooks (penalty scored); Surridge (penalty scored); Billing (penalty scored); Kelly (penalty scored); Solanke (penalty scored); Simpson (penalty scored); Gosling (penalty scored); Lerma (penalty scored); Ofoborh (penalty scored); Zemura (penalty scored); Begović (penalty missed); Brooks (penalty scored)		(penalty scored) Milivojević; (penalty scored) Batshuayi; (penalty scored) Townsend; (penalty scored) Eze; (penalty scored) Ayew; (penalty scored) Meyer; (penalty scored) Sakho; (penalty scored) Kelly; (penalty scored) Inniss; (penalty scored) Jach; (penalty missed) Hennessey; (penalty missed) Milivojević

== Player statistics ==
=== Appearances and goals ===
As of 23 May 2021

No.	Pos	Nat	Player	Total		Premier League		FA Cup		League Cup	
No.	Pos	Nat	Player	Apps	Goals	Apps	Goals	Apps	Goals	Apps	Goals
Goalkeepers
1	GK	(England) ENG	Jack Butland	2	0	1	0	1	0	0	0
13	GK	(Wales) WAL	Wayne Hennessey	1	0	0	0	0	0	1	0
31	GK	(Spain) ESP	Vicente Guaita	37	0	37	0	0	0	0	0
Defenders
2	DF	(England) ENG	Joel Ward	26	0	25+1	0	0	0	0	0
3	DF	(Netherlands) NED	Patrick van Aanholt	23	0	20+2	0	1	0	0	0
5	DF	(England) ENG	James Tomkins	9	0	6+2	0	1	0	0	0
6	DF	(England) ENG	Scott Dann	15	1	15	1	0	0	0	0
8	DF	(Senegal) SEN	Cheikhou Kouyaté	37	1	35+1	1	0+1	0	0	0
12	DF	(France) FRA	Mamadou Sakho	6	0	3+1	0	1	0	0+1	0
17	DF	(England) ENG	Nathaniel Clyne	14	0	13	0	1	0	0	0
24	DF	(England) ENG	Gary Cahill	20	1	20	1	0	0	0	0
27	DF	(England) ENG	Tyrick Mitchell	20	1	19	1	0+1	0	0	0
34	DF	(England) ENG	Martin Kelly	2	0	0+1	0	0	0	1	0
Midfielders
4	MF	(Serbia) SRB	Luka Milivojević	32	1	27+4	1	0	0	1	0
10	MF	(England) ENG	Andros Townsend	36	1	25+9	1	0+1	0	0+1	0
15	MF	(Ghana) GHA	Jeffrey Schlupp	28	2	15+12	2	0	0	1	0
18	MF	(Scotland) SCO	James McArthur	18	0	17+1	0	0	0	0	0
22	MF	(Republic of Ireland) IRL	James McCarthy	17	0	10+6	0	1	0	0	0
25	MF	(England) ENG	Eberechi Eze	36	4	29+5	4	1	0	1	0
37	MF	(England) ENG	Nya Kirby	1	0	0	0	0	0	1	0
44	MF	(Netherlands) NED	Jaïro Riedewald	34	2	19+14	2	1	0	0	0
Forwards
9	FW	(Ghana) GHA	Jordan Ayew	35	1	23+10	1	1	0	0+1	0
11	FW	(Ivory Coast) CIV	Wilfried Zaha	31	11	29+1	11	0+1	0	0	0
14	FW	(France) FRA	Jean-Philippe Mateta	7	1	2+5	1	0	0	0	0
20	FW	(Belgium) BEL	Christian Benteke	31	10	21+9	10	1	0	0	0
23	FW	(Belgium) BEL	Michy Batshuayi	20	2	7+11	2	1	0	1	0
Players out on loan
33	DF	(Poland) POL	Jarosław Jach	1	0	0	0	0	0	1	0
35	DF	(England) ENG	Sam Woods	1	0	0	0	0	0	1	0
Left team during season
45	DF	(England) ENG	Ryan Inniss	1	0	0	0	0	0	1	0
7	MF	(Germany) GER	Max Meyer	1	0	0	0	0	0	1	0

=== Goalscorers ===
As of 19 May 2021

No.	Pos.	Name	Premier League	FA Cup	League Cup	Total
11	FW	Wilfried Zaha	11	0	0	11
20	FW	Christian Benteke	10	0	0	10
25	MF	Eberechi Eze	4	0	0	4
15	MF	Jeffrey Schlupp	2	0	0	2
23	FW	Michy Batshuayi	2	0	0	2
44	MF	Jaïro Riedewald	2	0	0	2
4	MF	Luka Milivojević	1	0	0	1
6	DF	Scott Dann	1	0	0	1
8	DF	Cheikhou Kouyaté	1	0	0	1
9	FW	Jordan Ayew	1	0	0	1
10	MF	Andros Townsend	1	0	0	1
14	FW	Jean-Philippe Mateta	1	0	0	1
24	DF	Gary Cahill	1	0	0	1
27	DF	Tyrick Mitchell	1	0	0	1
—		Own goal	2	0	0	2
Total			41	0	0	41

=== Disciplinary record ===
As of 19 May 2021

No.	Pos.	Name	Premier League		FA Cup		League Cup		Total	
No.	Pos.	Name	Yellow card	Red card	Yellow card	Red card	Yellow card	Red card	Yellow card	Red card
4	MF	Luka Milivojević	8	1	0	0	0	0	8	1
11	FW	Wilfried Zaha	6	0	0	0	0	0	6	0
2	DF	Joel Ward	5	0	0	0	0	0	5	0
8	DF	Cheikhou Kouyaté	4	0	0	0	0	0	4	0
9	FW	Jordan Ayew	3	0	0	0	0	0	3	0
15	MF	Jeffrey Schlupp	3	0	0	0	0	0	3	0
18	MF	James McArthur	3	0	0	0	0	0	3	0
24	DF	Gary Cahill	3	0	0	0	0	0	3	0
25	MF	Eberechi Eze	3	0	0	0	0	0	3	0
44	MF	Jaïro Riedewald	3	0	0	0	0	0	3	0
20	FW	Christian Benteke	1	1	0	0	0	0	1	1
3	DF	Patrick van Aanholt	2	0	0	0	0	0	2	0
17	DF	Nathaniel Clyne	2	0	0	0	0	0	2	0
31	GK	Vicente Guaita	2	0	0	0	0	0	2	0
22	MF	James McCarthy	1	0	1	0	0	0	2	0
5	DF	James Tomkins	1	0	0	0	0	0	1	0
6	DF	Scott Dann	1	0	0	0	0	0	1	0
27	DF	Tyrick Mitchell	1	0	0	0	0	0	1	0
34	DF	Martin Kelly	0	0	0	0	1	0	1	0
Total			52	2	1	0	1	0	54	2

== Transfers ==
=== Transfers in ===
Date	Position	Nationality	Name	From	Fee	Ref.
21 July 2020	CB	(England)	Nathan Ferguson	Free agent (Note: Ferguson's previous contract at West Bromwich Albion expired. Though he was a free agent, a tribunal will decide if a fee is necessary, due to his age)	Tribunal	
30 July 2020	DM	(England)	Jake Giddings	Free agent (Note: Giddings previously played for West Ham United)	Free transfer	
28 August 2020	AM	(England)	Eberechi Eze	Queens Park Rangers	£16,000,000	
19 September 2020	RW	(England)	Harlem Hale	Southampton	Free transfer	
19 September 2020	LB	(England)	Reece Hannam	West Ham United	Free transfer	
19 September 2020	CF	(England)	Alfie Matthews	Arsenal	Free transfer	
14 October 2020	RB	(England)	Nathaniel Clyne	Free agent (Note: Clyne's previous club was Liverpool)	Free transfer	
16 October 2020	GK	(England)	Jack Butland	Stoke City	£1,000,000	
3 February 2021	RB	(England)	Danny Imray	Chelmsford City	Undisclosed	

=== Loans in ===
Date from	Position	Nationality	Name	From	Date until	Ref.
10 September 2020	CF	(Belgium)	Michy Batshuayi	Chelsea	End of season	
21 January 2021	CF	(France)	Jean-Philippe Mateta	(Germany) Mainz 05	End of next season	
3 February 2021	CB	(Republic of Ireland)	Jake O'Brien	(Republic of Ireland) Cork City	End of season	

=== Loans out ===
Date from	Position	Nationality	Name	To	Date until	Ref.
6 October 2020	CB	(Poland)	Jarosław Jach	(Netherlands) Fortuna Sittard	28 January 2021 (Note: Jach's loan was meant to be until the end of the season, but was terminated early.)	
11 January 2021	FW	(England)	Robert Street	Torquay United	End of season	
22 January 2021	CM	(England)	Nya Kirby	Tranmere Rovers	End of season	
22 January 2021	GK	(Northern Ireland)	Oliver Webber	Dover Athletic	13 February 2021 (Note: Webber's loan was cut short as Dover furloughed their entire staff due to the ongoing Pandemic)	
25 January 2021	RW	(Scotland)	Scott Banks	(Scotland) Dunfermline Athletic	End of season	
28 January 2021	CB	(Poland)	Jarosław Jach	(Poland) Raków Częstochowa	End of season	
31 January 2021	CB	(England)	Sam Woods	Plymouth Argyle	End of season	
1 February 2021	CF	(England)	Brandon Pierrick	(Scotland) Kilmarnock	End of season	
29 March 2021	CB	(Croatia)	Nikola Tavares	Wealdstone	End of season	

=== Transfers out ===
Date	Position	Nationality	Name	To	Fee	Ref.
1 July 2020	FW	(England)	Joshua Ajayi	Unattached (Note: Following his release, Ajayi joined Ramsgate.)	Released	
1 July 2020	DF	(England)	Jashaun Chamberlin-Gayle	Unattached	Released	
1 July 2020	CM	(Republic of Ireland)	Kian Flanagan	Unattached (Note: Flanagan re-signed for the club during the season.)	Released	
1 July 2020	GK	(England)	Dion-Curtis Henry	Billericay Town	Free Transfer	
1 July 2020	RW	(Belgium)	Jason Lokilo	Unattached (Note: Lokilo later joined Doncaster Rovers.)	Released	
1 July 2020	GK	(England)	Joe Tupper	Unattached (Note: Following his release, Tupper joined Havant & Waterlooville.)	Released	
22 September 2020	CF	(Norway)	Alexander Sørloth	(Germany) RB Leipzig	Undisclosed	
13 October 2020	CB	(England)	Ryan Inniss	Charlton Athletic	Free transfer	
15 January 2021	AM	(Germany)	Max Meyer	Unattached (Note: Following his release, Meyer joined 1. FC Köln.)	Released	
