= Baoringdao Bodo =

Indian footballer (born 1999)

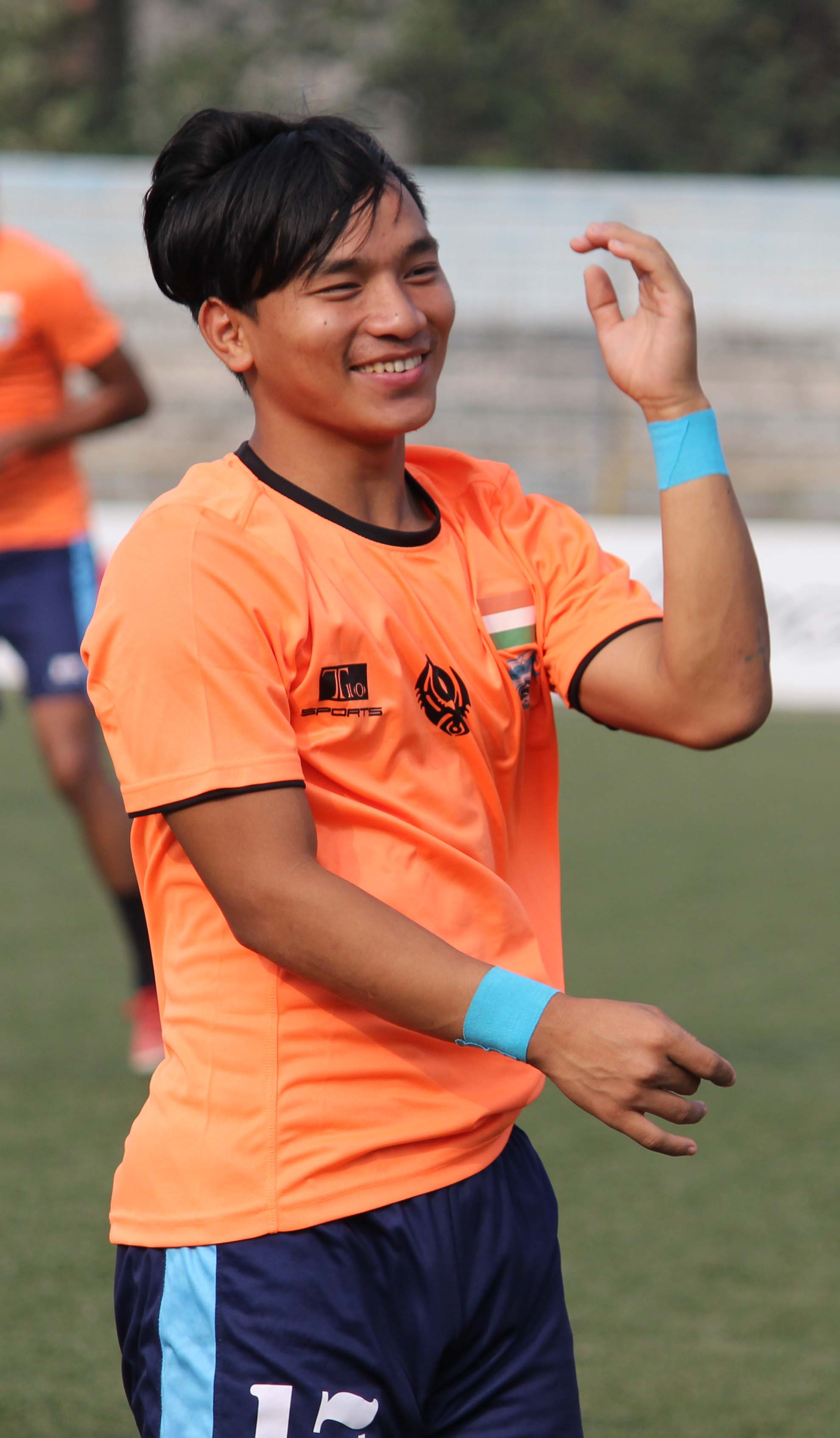
- Bodo with Minerva Punjab in 2017

Personal information
- Date of birth: 17 October 1999 (age 27)
- Place of birth: Haflong, Assam, India
- Height: 1.72 m (5 ft 8 in)
- Position: Winger

Team information
- Current team: Arabian Falcons
- Number: 11

Youth career
- 2011–2013: SAI Guwahati
- 2013–2016: AIFF Elite Academy

Senior career*
Years	Team	Apps	(Gls)
2016–2019	Chennaiyin	2	(0)
2017–2018	Chennaiyin B	1	(0)
2016–2017	→ Minerva Punjab (loan)	10	(1)
2018–2019	→ Gokulam Kerala (loan)	2	(1)
2019–2020	Kerala Blasters	2	(0)
2020	Bengaluru United	5	(0)
2020–2022	Odisha	1	(0)
2023–2024	TRAU	17	(4)
2024–	Arabian Falcons	0	(0)

International career^{‡}
2014	India U14	6	(2)
2014–2016	India U16	8	(5)
2016–2019	India U19	8	(7)
- * Club domestic league appearances and goals as of 15:18, 6 March 2023 (UTC) ‡ National team caps and goals as of 19 October 2017

Baoringdao Bodo (born 17 October 1999) is an Indian professional footballer who plays as a winger for TRAU.

He became India's youngest player in history to play, upon making his senior debut in January 2017. Bodo represented the India under-19 team and captained the nation at under-17 level.

== Early career ==
Born to a Dimasa Kachari family in the town of Haflong, Dima Hasao, Assam, Bodo started playing football at the age of 8 and then his father Mr. Jibon Bodo enrolled him at SAI Guwahati for better football training. In 2013, Bodo was selected for India camp for under 14. He joined AIFF Regional Academy in Kalyani, Kolkata under coach Gautam Ghosh. Bodo was the part of India U16 squad which has won the 2013 SAFF U-16 Championship and also AFC U16 Championship Qualifiers in 2014. Bodo improved a lot then he was promoted to AIFF Elite Academy in Goa. There he has represented India U19 in I-League U18, Subroto Cup and IFA Shield.

== Club career ==
=== Chennaiyin ===
In May 2016, Bodo along with four AIFF Elite Academy boys signed with former ISL Champions Chennaiyin FC on a long-term contract. Bodo became the youngest player to ever contracted with any ISL club.

=== Minerva Punjab (loan) ===
On 1 January 2017, Minerva signed Bodo on loan from Chennaiyin FC for 2016-17 I-League season. On 21 January 2017, Bodo made his league debut, coming-on as 46th-minute substitute for Kamalpreet Singh in an away match against Shillong Lajong at the Jawaharlal Nehru Stadium, Shillong. He made his first start for the club against Mumbai FC at the Guru Nanak Stadium in Ludhiana on 4 February 2017, where he also scored for the club in their 2–1 win and become the youngest player to ever score in the I-League.

=== Kerala Blasters ===
On 23 January 2019, Bodo made a permanent transfer to Kerala Blasters FC on a long-term deal.

=== Odisha FC ===
On 11 June 2020, Bodo signed a two–year deal with Odisha FC.

=== Arabian Falcons ===
In January 2024, Bodo moved abroad, signing with UAE Third Division League club Arabian Falcons.

== International career ==
Bodo first represented India at the under-14 level. He was part of the under-16 side that won the 2013 SAFF U-16 Championship and participated in the qualifiers for the AFC U-16 Championship. Bodo then went on to represent the under-19 side in the IFA Shield where he was adjudged MVP of the tournament and Top scorer of the tournament.

== Style of play ==
Former AIFF Academy coach Gautam Ghosh has described Bodo as "a really talented player with a bright footballing brain" who has the versatility to play as a winger on either flank, as a playmaker or as a striker. Bodo has been praised for his aerial ability, creativity, and bursts of acceleration. He has been referred to as a Neymar and has also been called the Indian Neymar Jr. by mainly Indian media.

== Career statistics ==
=== Club ===
As of 6 March 2023

Club	Season	League			Cup		AFC		Total	
Club	Season	Division	Apps	Goals	Apps	Goals	Apps	Goals	Apps	Goals
Chennaiyin	2017–18	Indian Super League	2	0	0	0	—		2	0
Chennaiyin B	2017–18	I-League 2nd Division	1	0	0	0	—		1	0
Minerva Punjab (loan)	2016–17	I-League	10	1	0	0	—		10	1
Gokulam Kerala (loan)	2018–19	I-League	2	1	0	0	—		2	1
Kerala Blasters	2018–19	Indian Super League	2	0	0	0	—		2	0
Bengaluru United	2020	I-League 2nd Division	5	0	0	0	—		5	0
Odisha	2020–21	Indian Super League	1	0	0	0	—		1	0
Odisha	2021–22	Indian Super League	0	0	0	0	—		0	0
Odisha	Odisha total		1	0	0	0	0	0	1	0
TRAU	2022–23	I-League	13	3	3 (Note: Appearance(s) in Durand Cup)	1	—		16	4
Career total			36	5	3	1	0	0	39	6

== Honours ==
India U16

- SAFF U-16 Championship: 2013

AIFF Elite Academy

- I-League U18: 2015–16

Chennaiyin

- Indian Super League: 2017–18

Individual

- IFA Shield MVP: 2016
- IFA Shield Top Scorer: 2016

== See also ==
- List of Indian expatriate footballers
