= Kian Flanagan =

Irish footballer

Personal information
- Full name: Kian Thomas Flanagan
- Date of birth: 29 August 1999 (age 27)
- Place of birth: Westminster, England
- Position: Midfielder

Youth career
- –2013: Southend United
- 2013–2017: Crystal Palace

Senior career*
Years	Team	Apps	(Gls)
2017–2021	Crystal Palace	0	(0)
2021–2023	Barnet	36	(1)
2022	→ Cheshunt (loan)	2	(0)

International career^{‡}
2015	Republic of Ireland U17	3	(1)
2016–2017	Republic of Ireland U18	6	(1)
2017–2018	Republic of Ireland U19	7	(0)
- * Club domestic league appearances and goals as of 08:25, 30 April 2023 (UTC) ‡ National team caps and goals as of 23:12, 27 May 2022 (UTC)

Kian Thomas Flanagan (born 29 August 1999) is a professional footballer who plays as a midfielder. Born in England, he has represented Ireland at youth level.

== Career ==
=== Club ===
Flanagan began his youth career with Southend United, moving to Crystal Palace in 2013, aged 13, for a fee of £37,500. In 2016, on his 17th birthday, he signed a two-year professional contract with the Eagles. In 2018–19, he won the club's young player of the season award, and saw his contract extended by a further year in 2019. In September 2019, Flanagan expressed his frustration at not having yet had a loan spell away from the club. Later that month, Flanagan went on trial at Doncaster Rovers with a view to a loan move in January. Manager Darren Moore was impressed by Flanagan, but no loan move materialised. He was named on Palace's released list at the end of the 2019–20 season, but remained with the club the following season before being released in the summer of 2021.

In July 2021, Flanagan signed for EFL League Two club Barnet. He joined Cheshunt on loan in September 2022. Following defeat in the play-offs, he was released by Barnet at the end of the 2022–23 season.

=== International ===
Flanagan is eligible for England and also the Republic of Ireland, who he has represented at under-17, under-18, and under-19 level.

== Career statistics ==
As of match played 29 April 2023

Appearances and goals by club, season and competition
Club	Season	League			FA Cup		League Cup		Other		Total	
Club	Season	Division	Apps	Goals	Apps	Goals	Apps	Goals	Apps	Goals	Apps	Goals
Crystal Palace	2017–18	Premier League	0	0	0	0	0	0	0	0	0	0
Crystal Palace	2018–19	Premier League	0	0	0	0	0	0	0	0	0	0
Crystal Palace	2019–20	Premier League	0	0	0	0	0	0	0	0	0	0
Crystal Palace	2020–21	Premier League	0	0	0	0	0	0	0	0	0	0
Crystal Palace	Total		0	0	0	0	0	0	0	0	0	0
Barnet	2021–22	National League	22	1	0	0	—		0	0	22	1
Barnet	2022–23	National League	14	0	1	0	—		1 (Note: Appearance(s) in Middlesex Senior Cup)	0	16	0
Barnet	Total		36	1	1	0	0	0	1	0	38	1
Cheshunt (loan)	2022–23	National League South	2	0	0	0	—		0	0	2	0
Career total			38	1	1	0	0	0	1	0	40	1
