= SV Overbos =

Dutch football club

- Full name: Sportvereniging Overbos
- Founded: 17 May 1986; 38 years ago
- Ground: Sportcomplex Overbos; Hoofddorp
- League: Vijfde Klasse (2023–24)
- Website: http://www.overbos.nl/
Home colours

Sportvereniging Overbos is a Dutch football club from Hoofddorp, which plays in the Vijde Klasse since 2023–24.

== Club history ==
Founded 17 May 1986, SV Overbos is a Dutch football club from Hoofddorp, North Holland which plays in the Vijde Klasse since 2023–24. Their grounds consist of eight pitches, and the club is dedicated to promote the sport within their community, fielding both a Men's and a Women's team. The men play their matches on Saturdays, whilst the women play on Sundays. Erik Drogtop is the longest playing member of the club.

== Affiliated clubs ==
On 13 January 2013, it was revealed that SV Overbos would partner with AFC Ajax Vrouwen, the Women's team from Amsterdam.

- (Netherlands) AFC Ajax Vrouwen (2013–present)
