= 2020–21 Manchester United F.C. season =

English football club season

Manchester United F.C.
2020–21 season
- Co-chairmen: Joel and Avram Glazer
- Manager: Ole Gunnar Solskjær
- Stadium: Old Trafford
- Premier League: 2nd
- FA Cup: Quarter-finals
- EFL Cup: Semi-finals
- UEFA Champions League: Group stage
- UEFA Europa League: Runners-up
- Top goalscorer: League: Bruno Fernandes (18); All: Bruno Fernandes (28)
- Highest home attendance: 10,000 (v. Fulham, 18 May 2021)
- Lowest home attendance: 10,000 (v. Fulham, 18 May 2021)
- Average home league attendance: 10,000
Home colours	Away colours	Third colours

The 2020–21 season was Manchester United's 29th season in the Premier League and their 46th consecutive season in the top flight of English football. The club finished second in the Premier League, their joint-highest finish since the retirement of Alex Ferguson in 2013, were knocked out of the EFL Cup in the semi-finals by local rivals Manchester City, in the quarter-finals of the FA Cup by Leicester City and finished third in their UEFA Champions League group, therefore being relegated to the UEFA Europa League.

The season threatened to be overshadowed by the attempted formation of a European Super League. On 18 April 2021, Manchester United announced they were joining 11 other European clubs as founding members of the Super League, a proposed 20-team competition intended to rival the UEFA Champions League. The announcement drew an unprecedented backlash from supporters, other clubs, media partners, sponsors, players and the UK Government, forcing the club to withdraw just two days later. The failure of the project led to the resignation of executive vice-chairman Ed Woodward, while resultant protests against Woodward and owners the Glazer family led to a pitch invasion ahead of a league match against Liverpool on 2 May 2021, which saw a Premier League game get postponed due to supporter protests for the first time in the competition's history.

On the pitch, United equalled the biggest win in Premier League history with a 9–0 victory against Southampton on 2 February 2021, but ended the season with defeat on penalties in the UEFA Europa League final against Villarreal, going four straight seasons without a trophy and one season away from equalling their worst trophy drought since the club was last relegated.

== Pre-season and friendlies ==
Due to the belated end to the previous season as a result of the COVID-19 pandemic, Manchester United played just one friendly before the start of their 2020–21 Premier League season, away to Aston Villa on 12 September 2020. Aston Villa's Ollie Watkins scored the only goal of the game in the 16th minute.

Date	Opponents	H / A	Result F–A	Scorers	Attendance
12 September 2020	Aston Villa	A	0–1		0

== Premier League ==
Manchester United's opening match of the 2020–21 Premier League season was due to be away to Burnley on 12 September, but was postponed to ensure a minimum of 30 days between seasons, as per Premier League regulations; the club's final game of the 2019–20 season was on 16 August. Instead, United began their season on 19 September at home to Crystal Palace. After Andros Townsend opened the scoring for the visitors early on, David de Gea denied Jordan Ayew from the penalty spot in the second half, only for the video assistant referee (VAR) to intervene as De Gea had advanced from his line before Ayew had struck the ball; former Manchester United winger Wilfried Zaha scored from the re-take. Donny van de Beek, making his debut after coming on midway through the second half, pulled a goal back for United, but Zaha scored a third for Palace five minutes later, making him the first former United player to score more than one Premier League goal in a single match against United. It was the third time United had lost their opening home match of a Premier League season and the first since 2014–15. The following week, away to Brighton & Hove Albion, United came back from a goal down via an own goal by Lewis Dunk and one from Marcus Rashford – the 10,000th goal in the club's history – to lead 2–1 as the match entered stoppage time at the end of the second half; however, as additional time drew to an end, Solly March equalised for the home side. As United searched for a last-minute winning goal, the referee blew the final whistle with the score at 2–2, only for the VAR to award a penalty to United for a handball by Neal Maupay. Bruno Fernandes scored the penalty to give United their first league win of the season.

In the following match on 4 October, the last before the international break, a Bruno Fernandes penalty gave United an early lead at home to Tottenham Hotspur, who were led by former United manager José Mourinho; however, Spurs overturned the deficit thanks to Tanguy Ndombele and Son Heung-min. After United forward Anthony Martial was sent off for slapping Erik Lamela in the face, Harry Kane scored a brace, Son added a second goal and Serge Aurier also scored to give Tottenham a 6–1 win. It was Manchester United's joint-biggest defeat in the Premier League, matching the scoreline from the Manchester derby in 2011, as well as the heaviest defeat under either Ole Gunnar Solskjær as manager or Ed Woodward as executive vice-chairman. The four goals United conceded in the first half was the most they had conceded at home in a single half since November 1957, also against Tottenham. United returned from the international break with a trip to Newcastle United on 17 October, and went behind early on to a Luke Shaw own goal. After Harry Maguire equalised with a header midway through the first half, Fernandes had a penalty saved by Newcastle goalkeeper Karl Darlow in the second, the first he had failed to score since joining the club in February. He eventually scored in the 86th minute, followed by goals from Aaron Wan-Bissaka in the 90th – the first of his senior career – and Rashford in the sixth minute of added time. On 24 October, United were held to a goalless draw by Chelsea. The result meant the club had failed to win any of their first three home league games for the first time since 1972–73; however, the result also extended United's unbeaten league record against Chelsea to six matches, with the most recent defeat coming in November 2017, while Chelsea had not won a league match at Old Trafford since the 2012–13 season.

On 1 November, United played rival Arsenal at home. Paul Pogba's foul inside the box led to Pierre-Emerick Aubameyang's winning penalty as Arsenal won a league match at Old Trafford for the first time since 17 September 2006. Before the international break, United travelled to Everton. The visitors won 3–1; Fernandes scored his first brace of the season before Edinson Cavani sealed the victory deep into the added time with his first United goal. Two weeks later, United returned to action at home against West Bromwich Albion. A retaken penalty from Fernandes – given after Albion's goalkeeper, former United shot stopper Sam Johnstone stepped out of the line before saving the first – secured United's maiden home league win of the season. On 29 November, United visited Southampton. Trailed 2–0 at half-time by goals from Jan Bednarek and James Ward-Prowse, United came back to win 3–2 via Fernandes and a brace from Cavani. Goalkeeper Dean Henderson made his league debut for the club, coming on at the interval for the injured De Gea. The win made United the first side in Premier League history to win four consecutive away games despite trailing in everyone of them, and also made United won eight consecutive top-flight away matches for the first time in their history.

On 5 December, United played West Ham United at the London Stadium. Henderson, on his first league start for the club, conceded to Tomáš Souček in the first half. In the second half, the visitors produced yet another comeback to win 3–1; Pogba and Mason Greenwood scored their first league goals of the season, before Rashford sealed the club's ninth straight away victory in the league. The next week, United were held 0–0 at home by derby rivals Manchester City; this was the first derby played at Old Trafford to end goalless since October 2015, and it was United's third consecutive clean sheet against City in all competitions, the longest since a run of four – all in the league – between 1994 and 1995. On 17 December, United managed yet another away comeback in a 3–2 win at Sheffield United, extending the club record to 10 consecutive league away wins. Rashford's two goals and Martial's first league goal of the season were enough to cancel out David McGoldrick's brace and keep Sheffield United winless after their first 13 league games of the season. On 20 December, United went rampant as they beat their "Roses" rival Leeds United 6–2 at home. Meeting for the first time in the league since 2004, McTominay opened the game with a brace inside three minutes, becoming the first player to do so in the league's history. Fernandes scored in the 20th minute before Victor Lindelöf scored his first goal of the season to put United 4–0 up after just 37 minutes. Liam Cooper pulled one back for the visitors before half time. Daniel James scored his first league goal of the season midway through the second half, before Fernandes scored a penalty in the 70th minute. Three minutes later, Stuart Dallas scored Leeds' second to close the match. This was the first league match in which United scored more than five goals since the 8–2 win over Arsenal in August 2011. United opened the Boxing Day matchday with a visit to Leicester City. Leading twice via Rashford and Fernandes with Harvey Barnes' goal sandwiched in between, United substitute defender Axel Tuanzebe scored an own goal after diverting Jamie Vardy's attempt to make the score 2–2. The club ended 2020 with a home game against Wolverhampton Wanderers. Rashford scored at 92:51 – United's latest winning goal at Old Trafford in the Premier League since Michael Owen on 20 September 2009 (95:27) – to make United end the year in second place.

On New Year's Day, United hosted Aston Villa in the second game of the matchweek. Martial scored first after 40 minutes before Bertrand Traoré equalises in the 58th minute. Fernandes sealed the win via a penalty three minutes later after referee Michael Oliver judged that Pogba had been fouled by Douglas Luiz inside the box. On 12 January, United visited Burnley for the game in hand from the first matchday. Pogba volleyed in the only goal of the game to send United top of the table with a three-point lead over defending champions and arch rivals Liverpool, whom they would meet in the following match. Both teams would only fire blanks as the said match ended goalless, keeping United top while Liverpool were down to fourth below Manchester City and Leicester City upon both sides' win in this matchday. Three days later, they played Fulham away. Ademola Lookman scored after five minutes to give Fulham the early lead. Cavani equalised 16 minutes later after a mistake by Fulham goalkeeper Alphonse Areola. United completed another comeback in the 65th minute by Pogba's long-range curling effort, sending United back to the top of the table after starting the match in third. On 27 January, United played the first return leg of the league season as they hosted bottom-placed Sheffield United. The visitors' Kean Bryan opened the scoring after 23 minutes to end the first half 1–0 up. Maguire equalised in 64th minute only to be cancelled by Oliver Burke as Manchester United were defeated in the league for the first time in 14 matches while Sheffield United earned only their second win of the league season. United ended January with a visit to rivals Arsenal. The match ended goalless as the visitors, still searching for a first league win in this fixture since April 2018, including all five league meetings under Solskjær, managed to deny Mikel Arteta from becoming the first Arsenal manager to win his first three matches against United.

United began February with a 9–0 victory over Southampton that equalled their own record for the biggest home win in the Premier League, set in 1995, while the visitors equalled their worst Premier League defeat, set in 2019. Eight different players scored, including an own goal by Jan Bednarek and the record-equalling goal scored by James. Martial, who came on at half-time, was the only player to score more than once. Four days later, United twice lost the lead in a 3–3 draw against Everton. Cavani and Fernandes scored past Everton's second-choice keeper Robin Olsen in the first half, only for Abdoulaye Doucouré and James Rodríguez to level the scores three minutes apart from each other. McTominay restored the lead only for Dominic Calvert-Lewin to equalise again in the final minute of stoppage time following Tuanzebe's foul on Everton substitute and fellow United Academy graduate Joshua King. On Valentine's Day, United visited West Bromwich Albion. Albion's loanee forward Mbaye Diagne rubbed Lindelöf's face off upon scoring inside 83 seconds. Fernandes equalised with a volley in the 44th minute following a cross from Shaw. In the second half, Maguire had a penalty cancelled by referee Craig Pawson after a stumble with Semi Ajayi was judged by VAR Jonathan Moss as not a foul. Facing Newcastle United the next Sunday, Rashford opened the scoring before Allan Saint-Maximin made the equaliser six minutes later. In the second half, Fernandes assisted James' goal and scored a penalty himself to secure a 3–1 win. Forward Shola Shoretire made his first team debut as he came on for Rashford. United ended the month with a 28 February visit to Chelsea. A presumed handball from Callum Hudson-Odoi resulted in a penalty cancelled by the VAR as the fixture ended goalless again, extending United's unbeaten league record against Chelsea to seven matches.

March began with a visit to Selhurst Park, where United had not been beaten in the previous 11 fixtures and won the last four. The former record was extended but not so for the latter; United failed to get revenge on Crystal Palace for their home defeat in September, as the match ended in a 0–0 draw. On 7 March, United visited derby rivals' home and in-form league leaders Manchester City. Fernandes scored a penalty in the second minute after Gabriel Jesus' foul on Martial in the box. Shaw scored United's second goal five minutes into the second half – his first league goal since August 2018 – as United won for the third successive time at the City of Manchester Stadium and tighten the gap to 11 points; this was City's first defeat in 20 league matches, breaking their 21-match winning run across all competitions. The next week, United hosted West Ham. An own goal by Craig Dawson following a shot from McTominay was the only goal scored as the hosts returned to the second place.

Following the international break at the end of March, United returned to action with a home game against Brighton. Despite starting brightly, it was the visitors who took the lead through former United striker Danny Welbeck in the 13th minute. Rashford levelled the scores just after the hour mark, before Greenwood sealed the win with a header seven minutes from the end, the eighth time in 2020–21 that they have won after being in a losing position. It was only the second time in the Premier League that United had come from behind to do the double over an opponent in a single season; the other being was against Southampton in 2012–13. On 11 April, United travelled to London to play Tottenham. Cavani seemingly scored an opener for the visiting side, but the goal was ruled out after it was seen by VAR that McTominay had hit Son Heung-min in the face and the goal was ruled out. Just moments later, Son scored the actual opener and gave the home side the lead. Twelve minutes into the second half, Fred scored his first league goal for United since September 2018 to equalise the score. Cavani then scored for real in the 79th minute, giving United the lead. In the final minute of stoppage time, Greenwood scored to secure a win for United and extended their unbeaten away run in the league to 23 matches. In the next game against Burnley, Greenwood scored two goals which sandwiched James Tarkowski's equaliser before Cavani sealed the 3–1 win in the added time. The final league match of April saw Manchester United's first visit to "Roses" rival Leeds' Elland Road since October 2003, which ended goalless.

The 2 May match against rivals Liverpool was postponed due to anti-Glazer protests at Old Trafford. The match at Aston Villa on 9 May saw United trailed by Traoré's first half goal. In the second half, Fernandes scored a penalty kick following Douglas Luiz's foul on Pogba, before Greenwood and Cavani completed their 10th Premier League comeback of the season, the most for any club in a single season. Two days later, United hosted Leicester by fielding a much-changed starting line-up. Left-back Luke Thomas opened the scoring after 10 minutes, this was his first goal for Leicester's first team. Greenwood equalised five minutes later, but Leicester got their winning goal via a thumping header from center-back Çağlar Söyüncü, his first goal since November 2019 as local rivals Manchester City were confirmed Premier League champions for the fifth time, all within the past 10 years. This was United's first league defeat since another 1–2 against Sheffield United in January 2021. This was also United's first home defeat to Leicester since 31 January 1998, and the first successive defeat to Leicester in all competitions since 1973. Two days later, United finally hosted Liverpool. Fernandes opened the scoring after 10 minutes and lasted 24 minutes before Diogo Jota's equaliser. Roberto Firmino scored twice to bring the visitors 3–1 up. Rashford pulled one back but Mohamed Salah sealed the game to send Liverpool to fifth. This was United's first home league defeat to Liverpool since the 0–3 in March 2014, with Firmino the first Liverpool player to score a league brace at Old Trafford since Steven Gerrard, who did it in the aforementioned match. On the final home match of the season, United played the already-relegated Fulham. Cavani's shot from 40 yards opened the scoring chart, but Joe Bryan equalised later on. Leicester's defeat to Chelsea later that night secured United's second place finish. On the final matchday on 23 May, in the away match against Wolverhampton, Anthony Elanga headed home his first senior goal before equaliser by Nélson Semedo. Romain Saïss' foul on Van de Beek inside the box resulted in a penalty for United executed by Juan Mata, who slotted the ball in to secure a 2–1 win in Wolves' manager Nuno Espírito Santo's final match in charge of the club. United thus became only the fourth side to remain unbeaten away from home in an entire English top-flight campaign, stretching from the first season in 1888–89.

=== Matches ===
Date	Opponents	H / A	Result F–A	Scorers	Attendance	League position
19 September 2020	Crystal Palace	H	1–3	Van de Beek 80'	0	16th
26 September 2020	Brighton & Hove Albion	A	3–2	Dunk 43' (o.g.), Rashford 55', Fernandes 90+10' (pen.)	0	13th
4 October 2020	Tottenham Hotspur	H	1–6	Fernandes 2' (pen.)	0	16th
17 October 2020	Newcastle United	A	4–1	Maguire 23', Fernandes 86', Wan-Bissaka 90', Rashford 90+6'	0	15th
24 October 2020	Chelsea	H	0–0		0	15th
1 November 2020	Arsenal	H	0–1		0	15th
7 November 2020	Everton	A	3–1	Fernandes (2) 25', 32', Cavani 90+5'	0	14th
21 November 2020	West Bromwich Albion	H	1–0	Fernandes 56' (pen.)	0	10th
29 November 2020	Southampton	A	3–2	Fernandes 59', Cavani (2) 74', 90+2'	0	9th
5 December 2020	West Ham United	A	3–1	Pogba 65', Greenwood 68', Rashford 78'	2,000	6th
12 December 2020	Manchester City	H	0–0		0	8th
17 December 2020	Sheffield United	A	3–2	Rashford (2) 26', 51', Martial 33'	0	6th
20 December 2020	Leeds United	H	6–2	McTominay (2) 2', 3', Fernandes (2) 20', 70' (pen.), Lindelöf 37', James 66'	0	3rd
26 December 2020	Leicester City	A	2–2	Rashford 23', Fernandes 79'	0	4th
29 December 2020	Wolverhampton Wanderers	H	1–0	Rashford 90+3'	0	2nd
1 January 2021	Aston Villa	H	2–1	Martial 40', Fernandes 61' (pen.)	0	2nd
12 January 2021	Burnley	A	1–0	Pogba 71'	0	1st
17 January 2021	Liverpool	A	0–0		0	1st
20 January 2021	Fulham	A	2–1	Cavani 21', Pogba 65'	0	1st
27 January 2021	Sheffield United	H	1–2	Maguire 64'	0	2nd
30 January 2021	Arsenal	A	0–0		0	2nd
2 February 2021	Southampton	H	9–0	Wan-Bissaka 18', Rashford 25', Bednarek 34' (o.g.), Cavani 39', Martial (2) 69', 90', McTominay 71', Fernandes 87' (pen.), James 90+3'	0	2nd
6 February 2021	Everton	H	3–3	Cavani 24', Fernandes 45', McTominay 70'	0	2nd
14 February 2021	West Bromwich Albion	A	1–1	Fernandes 44'	0	2nd
21 February 2021	Newcastle United	H	3–1	Rashford 30', James 57', Fernandes 75' (pen.)	0	2nd
28 February 2021	Chelsea	A	0–0		0	2nd
3 March 2021	Crystal Palace	A	0–0		0	2nd
7 March 2021	Manchester City	A	2–0	Fernandes 2' (pen.), Shaw 50'	0	2nd
14 March 2021	West Ham United	H	1–0	Dawson 53' (o.g.)	0	2nd
4 April 2021	Brighton & Hove Albion	H	2–1	Rashford 62', Greenwood 83'	0	2nd
11 April 2021	Tottenham Hotspur	A	3–1	Fred 57', Cavani 79', Greenwood 90+6'	0	2nd
18 April 2021	Burnley	H	3–1	Greenwood (2) 48', 84', Cavani 90+3'	0	2nd
25 April 2021	Leeds United	A	0–0		0	2nd
9 May 2021	Aston Villa	A	3–1	Fernandes 52' (pen.), Greenwood 56', Cavani 87'	0	2nd
11 May 2021	Leicester City	H	1–2	Greenwood 15'	0	2nd
13 May 2021 (Note: Originally scheduled for 2 May 2021 but postponed due to the 2021 Old Trafford protests.)	Liverpool	H	2–4	Fernandes 10', Rashford 68'	0	2nd
18 May 2021	Fulham	H	1–1	Cavani 15'	10,000	2nd
23 May 2021	Wolverhampton Wanderers	A	2–1	Elanga 13', Mata 45+4' (pen.)	4,500	2nd

=== League table ===
Pos	Team	Pld	W	D	L	GF	GA	GD	Pts	Qualification or relegation
1	Manchester City (C)	38	27	5	6	83	32	+51	86	Qualification for the Champions League group stage
2	Manchester United	38	21	11	6	73	44	+29	74	Qualification for the Champions League group stage
3	Liverpool	38	20	9	9	68	42	+26	69	Qualification for the Champions League group stage
4	Chelsea	38	19	10	9	58	36	+22	67	Qualification for the Champions League group stage
5	Leicester City	38	20	6	12	68	50	+18	66	Qualification for the Europa League group stage (Note: Since the winners of the 2020–21 FA Cup, Leicester City, also qualified for the Europa League based on league position, the second Europa League group stage berth allocated to England was transferred to the sixth-placed team.)

Source: Premier League
Rules for classification: 1) Points; 2) Goal difference; 3) Goals scored; 4) If the champions, relegated teams or qualified teams for UEFA competitions cannot be determined by rules 1 to 3, rules 4.1 to 4.3 are applied – 4.1) Points gained in head-to-head record between such teams; 4.2) Away goals scored in head-to-head record between such teams; 4.3) Play-offs
(C) Champions

== FA Cup ==
As a Premier League side, Manchester United entered the 2020–21 FA Cup in the Third Round Proper along with the other Premier League and Championship clubs. For this round, they were drawn at home against Championship side Watford. United took the lead via stand-in captain Scott McTominay inside five minutes, it was the only goal of the game as the hosts won 1–0. The draw for the fourth and fifth round were made on 11 January, conducted by Peter Crouch. They were drawn against arch rivals Liverpool. Liverpool took the lead through Mohamed Salah after 18 minutes, before Mason Greenwood's equaliser eight minutes later. Marcus Rashford scored the second, only to be equalised by Salah. Substitute Bruno Fernandes then scored the match-deciding free kick 12 minutes from time as United won 3–2, earning their first victory against Liverpool in all competitions since March 2018. In the fifth round, they played host to West Ham United. McTominay scored seven minutes into extra time to send the home side into the quarter-finals for the seventh successive season, equalling the club's longest home winning run in the competition (nine), set between 1908 and 1912. The match was also the first in English football to have a concussion substitute, as West Ham's Issa Diop did not return for the second 45 minute-half following his collision with Anthony Martial. In the quarter-finals, United were defeated 3–1 by Leicester City, the club's first domestic away loss since January 2020. Kelechi Iheanacho struck first before being equalised by Greenwood. In the second half, goals from Youri Tielemans and Iheanacho sealed Leicester's first FA Cup semis in 39 years and the first win against United in any competition since the 5–3 win in the league in September 2014.

Date	Round	Opponents	H / A	Result F–A	Scorers	Attendance
9 January 2021	Round 3	Watford	H	1–0	McTominay 5'	0
24 January 2021	Round 4	Liverpool	H	3–2	Greenwood 26', Rashford 48', Fernandes 78'	0
9 February 2021	Round 5	West Ham United	H	1–0 (a.e.t.)	McTominay 97'	0
21 March 2021	Quarter-finals	Leicester City	A	1–3	Greenwood 38'	0

== EFL Cup ==
Manchester United received a bye to the third round of the 2020–21 EFL Cup, having finished third in the 2019–20 Premier League and thus qualified for the 2020–21 UEFA Champions League. The draw took place on 6 September 2020 and paired United with the winners of the second round tie between Reading and Luton Town, both of the Championship. Luton won that match 1–0 and hosted the third round match on 22 September. United took the lead just before half-time through a Juan Mata penalty kick. In the second half, goalkeeper Dean Henderson, making his first-team debut, denied Luton an equaliser with a one-handed save from Tom Lockyer, before substitutes Marcus Rashford and Mason Greenwood both scored in the last couple of minutes to give United a 3–0 win.

In the fourth round, the club was drawn against the winners of the match between Preston North End and Brighton & Hove Albion, which Brighton won 2–0. The match came just four days after the two sides had met in the league, and saw Scott McTominay and Paul Pogba score their first goals of the season, while Juan Mata was again on the scoresheet to give United a 3–0 win.

In the quarter-finals, United were again given an away draw, this time against fellow Premier League club Everton. Playing before 2,000 spectators, United won 2–0 via late goals from Edinson Cavani and Anthony Martial.

In the semi-finals, they met derby rivals Manchester City at home. The clubs had met thrice in this round – in 1969–70, 2009–10, and 2019–20; the team progressed from each of these ties would gone on to win the trophy. City, the EFL Cup holders for three consecutive seasons, progressed to the record-equalling fourth final in a row with a 2–0 victory over a defensively poor United, who suffered a fourth consecutive cup competition semi-final exit.

Date	Round	Opponents	H / A	Result F–A	Scorers	Attendance
22 September 2020	Round 3	Luton Town	A	3–0	Mata 44' (pen.), Rashford 88', Greenwood 90+2'	0
30 September 2020	Round 4	Brighton & Hove Albion	A	3–0	McTominay 44', Mata 73', Pogba 80'	0
23 December 2020	Quarter-finals	Everton	A	2–0	Cavani 88', Martial 90+6'	2,000
6 January 2021	Semi-finals	Manchester City	H	0–2		0

== UEFA Champions League ==
=== Group stage ===
United qualified for the 2020–21 UEFA Champions League after finishing third in the 2019–20 Premier League. This was their 23rd UEFA Champions League campaign, more than any English club. The draw for the group stage took place in Geneva, Switzerland on 1 October 2020. The club was drawn in Group H with Paris Saint-Germain, RB Leipzig and Champions League group stage debutants İstanbul Başakşehir. This was United's first meeting with Paris Saint-Germain since the 2018–19 round of 16 tie, which United won on away goals through a stoppage time penalty, while they had never met Leipzig and Başakşehir.

In the first group match, United got a 2–1 away win at Paris Saint-Germain; goals from Bruno Fernandes and Marcus Rashford cancelled out Anthony Martial's own goal. United then beat RB Leipzig 5–0 in the second match a week later; Mason Greenwood opened the scoring in the first half, Rashford scored his first senior hat-trick after coming on as a second-half substitute, and Martial also scored a late penalty. Rashford's hat-trick was the first scored by a United substitute since current manager Solskjær did so against Nottingham Forest in 1999. It was United's eighth hat-trick in the Champions League, scored by six different players. It was the club's first in the competition since Wayne Rooney against Club Brugge in the 2015–16 play-off round, their first in the Champions League proper since Robin van Persie against Olympiacos in the 2013–14 knockout phase, and the first in the competition's group stage since Michael Owen against Wolfsburg in the 2009–10 season. Spanning 16 minutes, it was also the quickest of the five hat-tricks scored by substitutes in the competition's history.

In the third match, United lost 2–1 away to İstanbul Başakşehir, who had former United defender Rafael in their team. Former Chelsea forward Demba Ba gave Başakşehir their first ever goal in the Champions League on the way to claiming their first point – and first win – in the competition. The result ended United's club record 10-match winning streak on the road in all competitions, stretching back to a 1–1 draw with Tottenham in June 2020; it was also their first away defeat in all competitions in 19 matches, stretching back to January 2020.

In the return leg 20 days later, United got their revenge against Başakşehir by winning 4–1. Fernandes scored twice inside 20 minutes before Rashford slotted home a penalty to bring United led by three goals at half-time in a Champions League game for the first time since the 7–1 win over Roma in April 2007. A direct free-kick goal from Deniz Türüç – the first to be scored in the Champions League against United since Franck Ribéry in March 2010 – was cancelled out by Daniel James, who scored at home for the first time since August 2019.

On 2 December, United were defeated 3–1 by Paris Saint-Germain, with a brace from Neymar and a goal from Marquinhos cancelled Rashford's, who scored for the third consecutive match against the Parisians. The next week, Leipzig also got their revenge by winning 3–2 with goals from Angeliño, Amadou Haidara, and Justin Kluivert; Angeliño's goal at 1:49 was the quickest Champions League goal scored against United since Alan's for Sporting Braga in October 2012 (1:27). United scored two late goals via Fernandes and Ibrahima Konaté's own goal but their Champions League time was up before they could get the equaliser needed to progress. This was the first time since both legs of the quarter-final in 2002–03 that they conceded three or more goals in consecutive Champions League games while Solskjær became the first manager of an English club to lose at least six times in his first 10 Champions League games, having lost in 2018–19 against Paris Saint-Germain at home in the round of 16 and both of the season's quarter-final matches versus Barcelona.

Date	Opponents	H / A	Result F–A	Scorers	Attendance	Group position
20 October 2020	Paris Saint-Germain	A	2–1	Fernandes 23' (pen.), Rashford 87'	0	2nd
28 October 2020	RB Leipzig	H	5–0	Greenwood 21', Rashford (3) 74', 78', 90+2', Martial 87' (pen.)	577	1st
4 November 2020	İstanbul Başakşehir	A	1–2	Martial 43'	350	1st
24 November 2020	İstanbul Başakşehir	H	4–1	Fernandes (2) 7', 19', Rashford 35' (pen.), James 90+2'	545	1st
2 December 2020	Paris Saint-Germain	H	1–3	Rashford 32'	638	1st
8 December 2020	RB Leipzig	A	2–3	Fernandes 80' (pen.), Konaté 82' (o.g.)	0	3rd

Pos	Team	Pld	W	D	L	GF	GA	GD	Pts	Qualification
1	(France) Paris Saint-Germain	6	4	0	2	13	6	+7	12 (Note: Tied on head-to-head points (3). Head-to-head away goals: Paris Saint-Germain 1, RB Leipzig 0.)	Advance to knockout phase
2	(Germany) RB Leipzig	6	4	0	2	11	12	−1	12	Advance to knockout phase
3	(England) Manchester United	6	3	0	3	15	10	+5	9	Transfer to Europa League
4	(Turkey) İstanbul Başakşehir	6	1	0	5	7	18	−11	3	

Source: UEFA
Rules for classification: Group stage tiebreakers

== UEFA Europa League ==
=== Knockout phase ===
As one of the third-place finishers in the Champions League group stage, United entered the UEFA Europa League knockout phase. This was their fifth Europa League campaign, having also entered in the knockout phase in 2011–12 and 2015–16 as well as starting at the group stage during their 2016–17 winning campaign and 2019–20.

In the round of 32, United were drawn against Spanish club Real Sociedad, whom they last met in the 2013–14 UEFA Champions League group stage. The first leg was played at Juventus Stadium in Turin due to travel restrictions relating to the COVID-19 pandemic. Former United winger Adnan Januzaj, playing against the club for the first time since he was sold to Sociedad in July 2017, had the first chance of the tie, but United went on to win 4–0 with two goals from Bruno Fernandes and one each from Marcus Rashford and Daniel James. Winger Amad Diallo made his first-team debut for the club when he came on for Mason Greenwood. In the return leg at Old Trafford, Mikel Oyarzabal's missed penalty and a goal from Axel Tuanzebe that was disallowed for a foul by Lindelöf meant the match finished as a goalless draw. Forward Shola Shoretire made his European debut when he came on for Greenwood and became the youngest United player to appear in a European fixture, beating the record of Norman Whiteside by 108 days.

In the round of 16, United were drawn against Italian club and fellow former UEFA Champions League winner Milan, whom they last met in the 2009–10 UEFA Champions League knockout phase. This would be their first meeting outside the European Cup/UEFA Champions League. In the first leg, Amad scored first – his maiden goal for United – only to be equalised by Simon Kjær in the stoppage time. In the second leg, substitute Paul Pogba, playing his first game since 6 February 2021, scored the only goal as United progressed to the quarter-finals with a 2–1 aggregate win. Former United striker Zlatan Ibrahimović played against the club for the first time since leaving for LA Galaxy in March 2018 and nearly equalised via a header saved by goalkeeper Dean Henderson.

In the quarter-finals, United were drawn against another Spanish club in the form of Granada, whom they never played against before. This was the first season in their history that United faced more than one Spanish opposition. United won the first leg 2–0 with goals scored by Rashford and Fernandes, the club's first ever consecutive European away win against Spanish sides. Rashford became the first Englishman to score eight European competition proper goals in a single season since Bobby Charlton in 1964–65 season. In the return leg, a goal from Edinson Cavani and an own goal from Jesús Vallejo ensured United's passage to the semi-finals.

In the semi-finals, United met Italian club Roma, whom they last met in the 2007–08 UEFA Champions League knockout stage. After scoring first via Fernandes, United fell behind to goals from Lorenzo Pellegrini's penalty and former Manchester City forward Edin Džeko. In the second half, United scored five without reply; Fernandes scored his second via a penalty, Cavani scored a brace, with Pogba and Greenwood scoring one each to secure a first-leg win of 6–2. This made United the first side to score six goals in a major European competition's semi-final since Real Madrid won 6–0 against Zürich in 1964. The second leg was a tight one; United scored first through Cavani only to be reversed by Džeko and Bryan Cristante. Cavani scored again, but Nicola Zalewski's goal, which later would reassigned as Alex Telles' own goal, sent Roma to their first victory over United since 2007. However, United still went through with an 8–5 aggregate win as manager Solskjær progressed to his first final as United's manager, the club's first European final since the victorious 2017 UEFA Europa League final.

In the final, they met first-time finalists Villarreal, United's third Spanish opposition this season. The clubs previously met four times, in the 2005–06 and 2008–09 Champions League group stages. All ended in goalless draws. The final was held on 26 May 2021, on the 22nd anniversary of the now-manager Ole Gunnar Solskjær's winning goal in the UEFA Champions League final and also would have been the 112th birthday of former manager Matt Busby, who won the club its first European title in 1968. This match ended in a 1–1 draw after 120 minutes; Gerard Moreno stroke first before Cavani equalised in 55th minute. David de Gea became the last kicker in the penalties and the only one failed to score, as his was saved by Gerónimo Rulli, handing Villarreal their first ever major trophy and their head coach Unai Emery, formerly of Arsenal, his record fourth UEFA Cup/Europa League title, surpassing three-time winner Giovanni Trapattoni. Some of the team were later criticised on social media for removing their silver medal on field, or even refused to wear one.

Date	Round	Opponents	H / A	Result F–A	Scorers	Attendance
18 February 2021	Round of 32; First leg	Real Sociedad	N (Note: The match was originally due to take place at Sociedad's Anoeta Stadium, but was moved due to Spanish government restrictions on travellers from England regarding the new coronavirus variant.)	4–0	Fernandes (2) 27', 58', Rashford 65', James 90'	0
25 February 2021	Round of 32; Second leg	Real Sociedad	H	0–0		0
11 March 2021	Round of 16; First leg	Milan	H	1–1	Diallo 50'	0
18 March 2021	Round of 16; Second leg	Milan	A	1–0	Pogba 49'	0
8 April 2021	Quarter-finals; First leg	Granada	A	2–0	Rashford 31', Fernandes 90' (pen.)	0
15 April 2021	Quarter-finals; Second leg	Granada	H	2–0	Cavani 6', Vallejo 90' (o.g.)	0
29 April 2021	Semi-finals; First leg	Roma	H	6–2	Fernandes (2) 9', 71' (pen.), Cavani (2) 48', 64', Pogba 75', Greenwood 86'	0
6 May 2021	Semi-finals; Second leg	Roma	A	2–3	Cavani (2) 39', 68'	0
26 May 2021	Final	Villarreal	N	1–1 (a.e.t.) (10–11p)	Cavani 55'	9,412

== Squad statistics ==
No.	Pos.	Name	League		FA Cup		League Cup		Europe		Total		Discipline	
No.	Pos.	Name	Apps	Goals	Apps	Goals	Apps	Goals	Apps	Goals	Apps	Goals	Yellow card	Red card
1	GK	(Spain) David de Gea	26	0	0	0	0	0	10	0	36	0	0	0
2	DF	(Sweden) Victor Lindelöf	29	1	3	0	2	0	11	0	45	1	4	0
3	DF	(Ivory Coast) Eric Bailly	10(2)	0	1	0	3	0	5	0	19(2)	0	4	0
4	DF	(England) Phil Jones	0	0	0	0	0	0	0	0	0	0	0	0
5	DF	(England) Harry Maguire (c)	34	2	3(1)	0	3	0	11	0	51(1)	2	15	0
6	MF	(France) Paul Pogba	21(5)	3	2	0	2(1)	1	6(5)	2	31(11)	6	8	0
7	FW	(Uruguay) Edinson Cavani	13(13)	10	1(2)	0	1	1	6(3)	6	21(18)	17	5	0
8	MF	(Spain) Juan Mata	6(3)	1	1	0	2	2	1(5)	0	10(8)	3	0	0
9	FW	(France) Anthony Martial	17(5)	4	2(2)	0	1(1)	1	7(1)	2	27(9)	7	1	1
10	FW	(England) Marcus Rashford	33(4)	11	2(1)	1	1(3)	1	10(3)	8	46(11)	21	4	0
11	FW	(England) Mason Greenwood	21(10)	7	4	2	1(2)	1	10(4)	2	36(16)	12	2	0
12	DF	(England) Chris Smalling	0	0	0	0	0	0	0	0	0	0	0	0
13	GK	(England) Lee Grant	0	0	0	0	0	0	0	0	0	0	0	0
14	MF	(England) Jesse Lingard	0	0	1	0	1(1)	0	0	0	2(1)	0	0	0
15	MF	(Brazil) Andreas Pereira	0	0	0	0	0	0	0	0	0	0	0	0
16	DF	(Argentina) Marcos Rojo	0	0	0	0	0	0	0	0	0	0	0	0
17	MF	(Brazil) Fred	27(3)	1	2(1)	0	3	0	10(2)	0	42(6)	1	9	1
18	MF	(Portugal) Bruno Fernandes	35(2)	18	0(3)	1	2(1)	0	14(1)	9	51(7)	28	7	0
19	MF	(Ivory Coast) Amad Diallo	2(1)	0	0(1)	0	0	0	0(4)	1	2(6)	1	0	0
20	DF	(Portugal) Diogo Dalot	0	0	0	0	1	0	0	0	1	0	0	0
21	MF	(Wales) Daniel James	11(4)	3	1	0	1	0	5(4)	2	18(8)	5	3	0
22	GK	(Argentina) Sergio Romero	0	0	0	0	0	0	0	0	0	0	0	0
23	DF	(England) Luke Shaw	30(2)	1	1(2)	0	1(1)	0	9(1)	0	41(6)	1	13	0
24	DF	(Netherlands) Timothy Fosu-Mensah	1	0	0	0	0	0	0(2)	0	1(2)	0	1	0
25	FW	(Nigeria) Odion Ighalo	0(1)	0	0	0	2	0	0(1)	0	2(2)	0	0	0
26	GK	(England) Dean Henderson	12(1)	0	4	0	4	0	5	0	25(1)	0	3	0
27	DF	(Brazil) Alex Telles	8(1)	0	3	0	1	0	8(3)	0	20(4)	0	1	0
28	MF	(Uruguay) Facundo Pellistri	0	0	0	0	0	0	0	0	0	0	0	0
29	DF	(England) Aaron Wan-Bissaka	34	2	3	0	2	0	15	0	54	2	4	0
30	GK	(England) Nathan Bishop	0	0	0	0	0	0	0	0	0	0	0	0
31	MF	(Serbia) Nemanja Matić	12(8)	0	2(1)	0	2	0	6(5)	0	22(14)	0	4	0
33	DF	(England) Brandon Williams	2(2)	0	1(1)	0	2	0	0(6)	0	5(9)	0	2	0
34	MF	(Netherlands) Donny van de Beek	4(15)	1	4	0	3(1)	0	4(5)	0	15(21)	1	1	0
37	MF	(England) James Garner	0	0	0	0	0	0	0	0	0	0	0	0
38	DF	(England) Axel Tuanzebe	4(5)	0	1	0	1	0	3(5)	0	9(10)	0	7	0
39	MF	(Scotland) Scott McTominay	25(7)	4	2(2)	2	2	1	9(2)	0	38(11)	7	7	0
40	GK	(Portugal) Joel Castro Pereira	0	0	0	0	0	0	0	0	0	0	0	0
43	DF	(England) Teden Mengi	0	0	0	0	0	0	0	0	0	0	0	0
44	FW	(Netherlands) Tahith Chong	0	0	0	0	0	0	0	0	0	0	0	0
46	MF	(France) Hannibal Mejbri	0(1)	0	—		—		0	0	0(1)	0	0	0
48	DF	(England) Will Fish	0(1)	0	0	0	0	0	0	0	0(1)	0	0	0
56	FW	(Sweden) Anthony Elanga	2	1	—		—		0	0	2	1	0	0
60	GK	(Czech Republic) Ondřej Mastný	0	0	0	0	0	0	0	0	0	0	0	0
74	FW	(England) Shola Shoretire	0(2)	0	0	0	—		0(1)	0	0(3)	0	0	0
Own goals			—	3	—	0	—	0	—	2	—	5	—	—

== Transfers ==
=== In ===
Date	Pos.	Name	From	Fee	Ref.
2 September 2020	MF	(Netherlands) Donny van de Beek	(Netherlands) Ajax	Undisclosed (Note: Fee reported as £35 million, plus £5 million in add-ons.)	
5 October 2020	DF	(Brazil) Alex Telles	(Portugal) Porto	Undisclosed (Note: Fee reported as £13.6 million, plus £1.8 million in add-ons.)	
5 October 2020	FW	(Uruguay) Edinson Cavani	Unattached (Note: Most recently played for Paris Saint-Germain.)	Free	
5 October 2020	MF	(Uruguay) Facundo Pellistri	(Uruguay) Peñarol	Undisclosed (Note: Fee reported as £9 million.)	
7 January 2021	MF	(Ivory Coast) Amad Diallo	(Italy) Atalanta	Undisclosed (Note: Fee reported as £19 million, plus £18.1 million in add-ons.)	

=== Out ===
Date	Pos.	Name	To	Fee	Ref.
30 June 2020	DF	(England) Cameron Borthwick-Jackson	Released (Note: Joined Oldham Athletic on 2 August 2020.)		
30 June 2020	GK	(Slovakia) Alex Fojtíček	Released (Note: Joined Blackpool on 25 August 2020.)		
30 June 2020	MF	(Scotland) Ethan Hamilton	Released (Note: Joined Peterborough United on 13 August 2020.)		
30 June 2020	DF	(England) Demetri Mitchell	Released (Note: Joined Blackpool on 4 September 2020.)		
30 June 2020	GK	(Republic of Ireland) Kieran O'Hara	Released (Note: Joined Burton Albion on 11 September 2020.)		
30 June 2020	FW	(Belgium) Largie Ramazani	Released (Note: Joined Almería on 24 August 2020.)		
30 June 2020	DF	(England) George Tanner	Released (Note: Joined Carlisle United on 3 August 2020.)		
30 June 2020	MF	(England) Aidan Barlow	Released		
30 June 2020	MF	(England) Dion McGhee	Released (Note: Joined Braga on 8 January 2021.)		
30 June 2020	MF	(England) Angel Gomes	Released (Note: Joined Lille on 4 August 2020.)		
23 July 2020	DF	(England) Ben Hockenhull	(England) Brentford	Undisclosed	
6 August 2020	FW	(Chile) Alexis Sánchez	(Italy) Inter Milan	Free	
4 September 2020	DF	(Wales) Oliver Denham	(Wales) Cardiff City	Free	
11 September 2020	FW	(Republic of Ireland) Deji Sotona	Released (Note: Joined Nice on 30 September 2020.)		
5 October 2020	DF	(England) Chris Smalling	(Italy) Roma	Undisclosed (Note: Fee reported as €15 million, plus €5 million in add-ons.)	
19 November 2020	DF	(England) Owen Dodgson	(England) Burnley	Undisclosed	
19 November 2020	DF	(England) Calen Gallagher-Allison	(England) Burnley	Undisclosed	
4 January 2021	MF	(England) Max Haygarth	(England) Brentford	Undisclosed	
8 January 2021	DF	(Italy) Luca Ercolani	(Italy) Carpi	Undisclosed	
13 January 2021	DF	(Netherlands) Timothy Fosu-Mensah	(Germany) Bayer Leverkusen	Undisclosed (Note: Fee reported as £1.8 million.)	
25 January 2021	DF	(Poland) Łukasz Bejger	(Poland) Śląsk Wrocław	Undisclosed	
2 February 2021	DF	(Argentina) Marcos Rojo	(Argentina) Boca Juniors	Undisclosed	
7 May 2021	DF	(England) Harvey Neville	(United States) Fort Lauderdale CF	Undisclosed	

=== Loan out ===
Date from	Date to	Pos.	Name	To	Ref.
16 August 2020	30 January 2021	FW	(Netherlands) Tahith Chong	(Germany) Werder Bremen	
17 August 2020	End of season	MF	(France) Aliou Traoré	(France) Caen	
28 August 2020	5 January 2021	GK	(Czech Republic) Matěj Kovář	(England) Swindon Town	
29 August 2020	End of season	GK	(Portugal) Joel Castro Pereira	(England) Huddersfield Town	
8 September 2020	8 January 2021	MF	(Wales) Dylan Levitt	(England) Charlton Athletic	
18 September 2020	30 January 2021	MF	(England) James Garner	(England) Watford	
1 October 2020	January 2021	DF	(England) Max Taylor	(England) Kidderminster Harriers	
2 October 2020	End of season	MF	(Brazil) Andreas Pereira	(Italy) Lazio	
4 October 2020	End of season	DF	(Portugal) Diogo Dalot	(Italy) Milan	
16 October 2020	End of season	DF	(England) Di'Shon Bernard	(England) Salford City	
16 October 2020	January 2021	MF	(England) Max Haygarth	(England) Brentford B	
16 October 2020	January 2021	GK	(England) Jacob Carney	(England) Brighouse Town	
8 January 2021	End of season	DF	(England) Ethan Laird	(England) Milton Keynes Dons	
15 January 2021	End of season	GK	(England) Jacob Carney	(Northern Ireland) Portadown	
29 January 2021	End of season	MF	(England) Jesse Lingard	(England) West Ham United	
30 January 2021	End of season	MF	(England) James Garner	(England) Nottingham Forest	
30 January 2021	End of season	FW	(Netherlands) Tahith Chong	(Belgium) Club Brugge	
31 January 2021	End of season	MF	(Uruguay) Facundo Pellistri	(Spain) Deportivo Alavés	
1 February 2021	End of season	DF	(England) Teden Mengi	(England) Derby County	
15 February 2021	End of season	MF	(Wales) Dylan Levitt	(Croatia) Istra 1961	
