= Dean Henderson =

English footballer (born 1997)

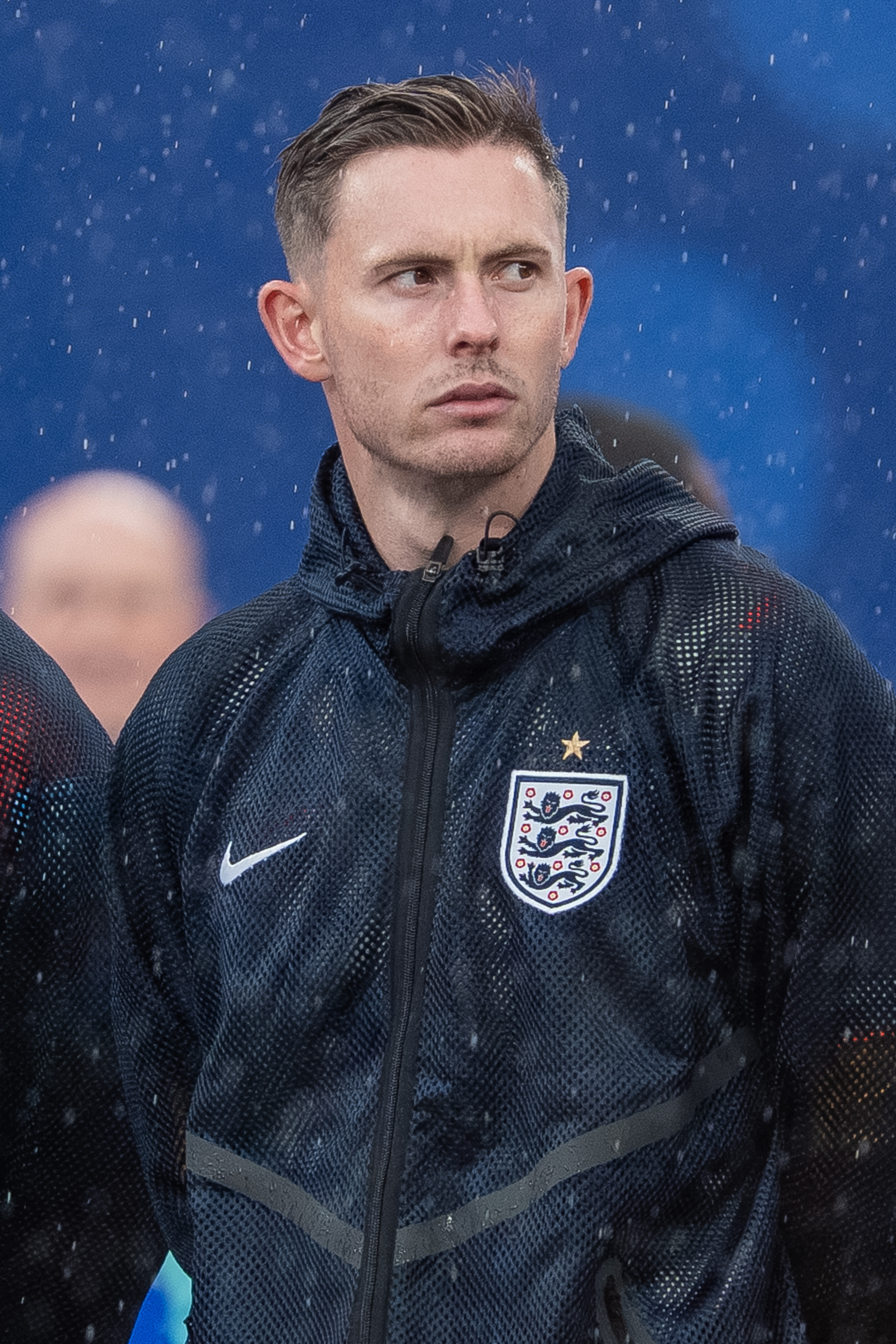
- Henderson with England in 2026

Personal information
- Full name: Dean Bradley Henderson
- Date of birth: 12 March 1997 (age 29)
- Place of birth: Whitehaven, Cumbria, England
- Height: 6 ft 2 in (1.88 m)
- Position: Goalkeeper

Team information
- Current team: Crystal Palace
- Number: 1

Youth career
- 2005–2011: Carlisle United
- 2011–2015: Manchester United

Senior career*
| Years | Team | Apps | (Gls) |
| 2015–2023 | Manchester United | 13 | (0) |
| 2016 | → Stockport County (loan) | 9 | (0) |
| 2016–2017 | → Grimsby Town (loan) | 7 | (0) |
| 2017–2018 | → Shrewsbury Town (loan) | 38 | (0) |
| 2018–2019 | → Sheffield United (loan) | 46 | (0) |
| 2019–2020 | → Sheffield United (loan) | 36 | (0) |
| 2022–2023 | → Nottingham Forest (loan) | 18 | (0) |
| 2023– | Crystal Palace | 98 | (0) |

International career^{‡}
| 2012 | England U16 | 1 | (0) |
| 2013–2014 | England U17 | 5 | (0) |
| 2016–2017 | England U20 | 6 | (0) |
| 2018–2019 | England U21 | 11 | (0) |
| 2020– | England | 6 | (0) |
Medal record
Men's football
Representing England
FIFA World Cup
| Third place | 2026 Canada–Mexico–US |
UEFA European Championship
| Runner-up | 2020 Europe |
| Runner-up | 2024 Germany |
FIFA U-20 World Cup
| Winner | 2017 South Korea |
- * Club domestic league appearances and goals as of 03:55, 12 November 2026 (UTC) ‡ National team caps and goals as of 23:00, 18 July 2026 (UTC)

Dean Bradley Henderson (born 12 March 1997) is an English professional footballer who plays as a goalkeeper for Premier League club Crystal Palace, whom he captains, and the England national team.

Henderson joined Manchester United's youth system in 2011 from Carlisle United. Between 2015 and 2020, he was loaned out to a number of teams across divisions, before making his Premier League debut with Sheffield United in 2019. After returning to Manchester United's first team and making his debut in 2020, he spent two seasons making sporadic appearances as a back-up.

After a season on loan at Nottingham Forest, Henderson was signed permanently by Crystal Palace in 2023, where he won the FA Cup and Community Shield in 2025. He was appointed club captain in 2026, leading his side to win the UEFA Conference League the same year.

Henderson has represented England at under-16, under-17, under-20, under-21, and senior levels. He was a member of the England under-20 squad that won the 2017 FIFA U-20 World Cup, and the senior team that were runners-up at UEFA Euro 2020 and UEFA Euro 2024 and finished third at the 2026 FIFA World Cup.

== Club career ==
=== Manchester United ===
Henderson joined the Manchester United academy aged 14, having spent six years at Carlisle United. He first joined the academy in August 2011.

After progressing through the academy, Henderson was among 10 players to join the academy squad for the 2013–14 season. He became a regular goalkeeper for the U18 team in the 2013–14 season.

In the 2014–15 season, Henderson continued to impress as a regular goalkeeper for the U18 team, as he made 25 appearances but sustained an injury towards the end of the season. Nevertheless, he was among nominees for the Jimmy Murphy Young Player of the Year award but lost out to Axel Tuanzebe. In August 2015, Henderson signed his first professional contract with the club.

==== 2016: Loan to Stockport County ====
On 12 January 2016, he was loaned to National League North club Stockport County on an initial one-month loan. He made his Stockport County debut, where he played the whole game, in a 1–1 draw against Nuneaton Town on 16 January 2016.

On 22 February 2016, due to an injury crisis, Henderson was recalled from loan and had his first call-up to a senior Manchester United game, sitting on the bench during a 3–0 FA Cup victory away to Shrewsbury Town. Henderson then returned to Stockport County to complete his loan spell. His first game after signing for the club for the second time was a 2–0 loss against North Ferriby United on 26 March 2016. He went on to make nine appearances for Stockport County and kept three clean sheets.

==== 2016–2017: Loan to Grimsby Town ====
On 31 August 2016, Henderson joined League Two club Grimsby Town on loan until the beginning of January 2017. However, he started his Grimsby Town career as second–choice goalkeeper behind James McKeown. Henderson made his debut on 26 December 2016, in a 2–0 victory over Accrington Stanley at Blundell Park. After making his debut, his performance was praised by Manager Marcus Bignot. On 31 December 2016, Henderson had his loan at Grimsby Town extended until the end of January 2017. On the same day, he kept another clean sheet, in a 0–0 draw against Blackpool.

It was then extended again on 25 January 2017, until the end of the 2016–17 season. However, Manchester United recalled Henderson from the loan spell on 3 February 2017, due to an injury to third-choice goalkeeper Joel Castro Pereira. By the time of his departure, Henderson made seven appearances and kept four clean sheets; he had become the first-choice goalkeeper.

==== 2017–2018: Loan to Shrewsbury Town ====
On 10 July 2017, Henderson joined League One club Shrewsbury Town on loan for the 2017–18 season. Upon joining the club, Henderson was given a number 1 shirt ahead of the new season. Henderson made his Shrewsbury Town debut in the opening game of the season, where he kept a clean sheet in a 1–0 win over Northampton Town. He also kept another clean sheet in a follow–up match, in a 1–0 win over AFC Wimbledon. Henderson quickly established himself as the club's first choice goalkeeper and became the club's fan favourite. He has also helped the club win the number of matches to help them go to the top of the table. By September, Henderson reflected his time at the club so far, saying he enjoyed playing football there and playing Saturday/Tuesday is excellent for his development.

By December, there were rumours that his parent club might recall Henderson in January. Later that month, Henderson kept three clean sheets in three matches against Blackpool, Portsmouth and Wigan Athletic. However, Henderson served a three match suspension after being involved in an altercation with an opposition supporter during a 3–1 loss against Blackburn Rovers on 13 January 2018. Initially the club made a decision to appeal, the club changed their mind shortly after. After serving a three match ban, Henderson returned to the starting line-up on 13 February 2018, in a 2–1 win over Fleetwood Town. By the end of March, Henderson kept 13 clean sheets for the team.

On 8 April 2018, he played at Wembley Stadium in the 2018 EFL Trophy final against Lincoln City, which Shrewsbury Town lost 1–0, and later that month was one of only three players not from Wigan Athletic or Blackburn Rovers to be selected for the League One PFA Team of the Year. The following month, in the League One play-offs, Henderson kept two clean sheets in a 2–0 win over Charlton Athletic on aggregate to reach the final. Henderson started in goal in the final when Rotherham United beat Shrewsbury Town 2–1 after extra time, and he saved a penalty from David Ball after nine minutes.

Henderson made two separate statements, expressing his gratitude and admiration for the club, and his hope to one day return in the future.

==== 2018–2020: Loans to Sheffield United ====
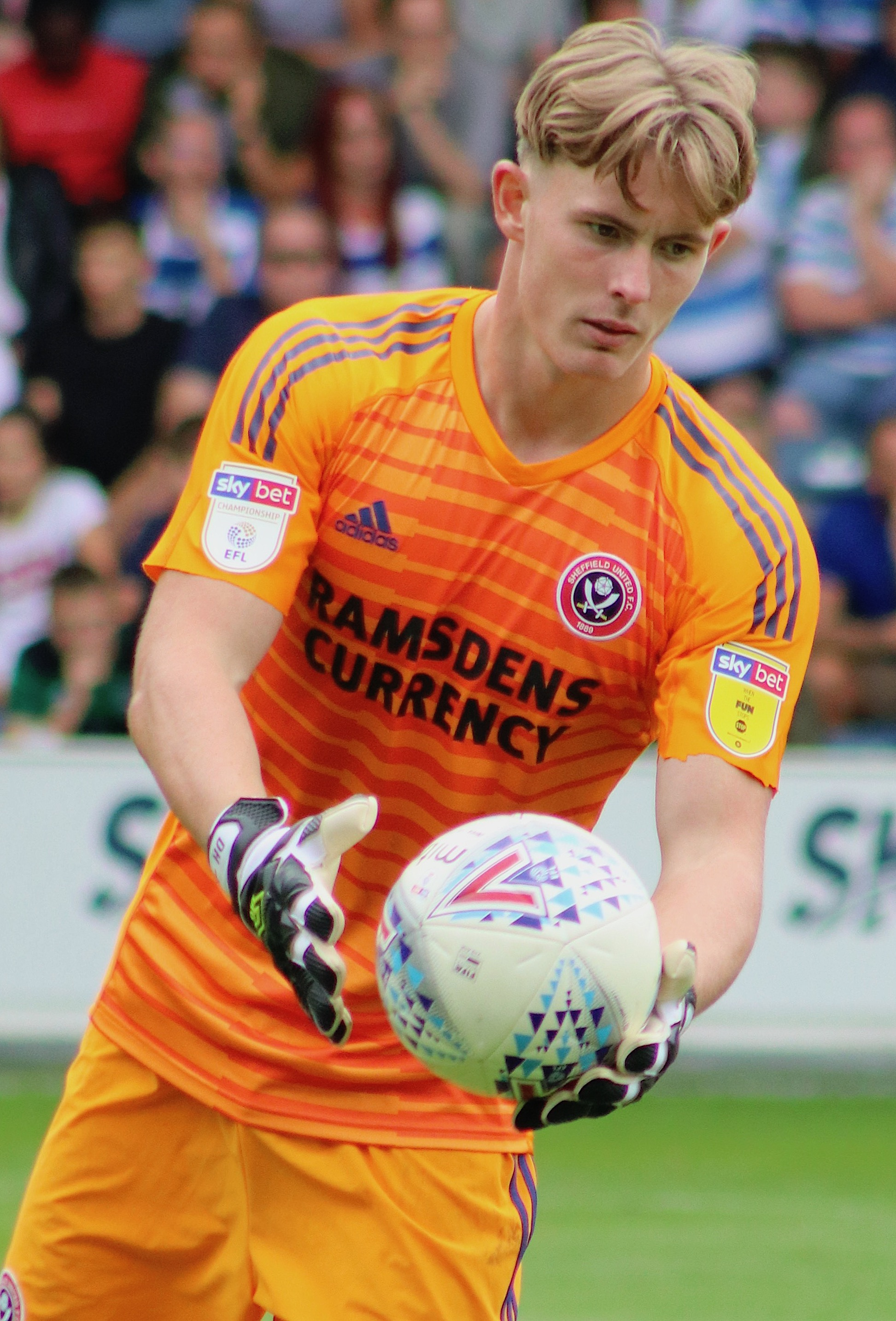
Henderson playing for Sheffield United in 2018

In June 2018, Henderson signed a two-year contract extension with his parent club, which was due to expire in June 2020. On 18 June, he joined Championship club Sheffield United on loan until the end of the 2018–19 season, helping them to secure promotion to the Premier League for the first time since 2007. During his season-long loan, Henderson won the club's Young Player of the Year Award, as well as the Championship Golden Glove keeping 20 clean sheets across the season. Following an impressive debut season in the championship, European giants Bayern Munich and Juventus had reported interest in the goalkeeper.

On 25 July 2019, Henderson signed a new contract with Manchester United until June 2022 and returned on loan to Sheffield United. He made his Premier League debut on 10 August as they began the season with a 1–1 draw at AFC Bournemouth. On 28 September against Liverpool at Bramall Lane, he fumbled a shot from Georginio Wijnaldum for the game's only goal in the 70th minute. His manager Chris Wilder warned him that he would have to do better to succeed for Manchester United or England. On 7 March, Henderson made a triple save, labelled "heroic" by Sky Sports, keeping out a Norwich City goal in a 1–0 victory. Henderson received praise again during Sheffield United's first game following project restart where he kept his 11th clean sheet of the season, making six saves in the process. Following the match, Manchester United manager Ole Gunnar Solskjær confirmed that he sees Henderson as the club's future number one goalkeeper.

==== 2020–2022: Manchester United first team ====
On 14 August 2020, Henderson was added to Manchester United's senior squad list for the first time. On 26 August, he signed a new long-term contract that would keep him at Manchester United until June 2025. He made his senior debut in September in the third round of the League Cup against Luton Town, keeping a clean sheet in the process during United's 3–0 win. He made his second appearance for United a week later in the fourth round of the League Cup, keeping another clean sheet in a 3–0 victory over Brighton & Hove Albion. On 4 November, Henderson made his Champions League debut for United in a 2–1 group stage away defeat to İstanbul Başakşehir. Twenty-five days later, he made his league debut for the club as a substitute for the injured David de Gea in a 3–2 away win over Southampton.

In March 2021, with first choice goalkeeper David de Gea away on paternity leave, Henderson was given the start against Crystal Palace on 3 March. Henderson started the following game, the Manchester Derby, which saw United win 2–0. Henderson created the second goal of the game with a halfway-line throw to Luke Shaw which saw Shaw beat his man, before a one-two with Marcus Rashford and scoring. De Gea returned to the UK ahead of United's next game against West Ham; however, pandemic quarantine rules and Henderson's good performances saw Henderson continue as starting goalkeeper. Henderson started all league games in April and alternated starts in May, as did most of the squad, due to United's fixtures congestion caused by the pandemic and the 2021 Old Trafford protests. Henderson made 25 starts and one substitute appearances in United's 2020–21 season.

During Manchester United's 2021–22 pre-season Henderson caught COVID-19. This developed into long COVID, and saw Henderson out of the squad until late September when he played in United's League Cup opener, where defeat to West Ham saw them exit the competition in their first game. Henderson's only other domestic appearances in the 2021–22 season was the club's FA Cup exit to Middlesbrough.

Failing to regain his starting place, at the end Henderson accused Manchester United of making him "sit there and waste 12 months", "not [following] through with anything they told me", and refused to play under incoming manager Erik Ten Hag. He was loaned to Nottingham Forest the following season.

==== 2022–2023: Loan to Nottingham Forest ====
On 2 July 2022, Henderson joined newly promoted Premier League club Nottingham Forest on loan for the 2022–23 season. In an interview with TalkSport in August 2022, Henderson criticised his parent club over his lack of game time during the previous season. On 14 August 2022, during his second appearance for the club, Henderson saved a penalty from Declan Rice and kept a clean sheet in a 1–0 win against West Ham as Forest won the first Premier League game played at the City Ground in 23 years. Henderson remained the club's starting goalkeeper until he sustained a season-ending thigh injury during a 2–0 win over Leicester City on 14 January 2023.

=== Crystal Palace ===
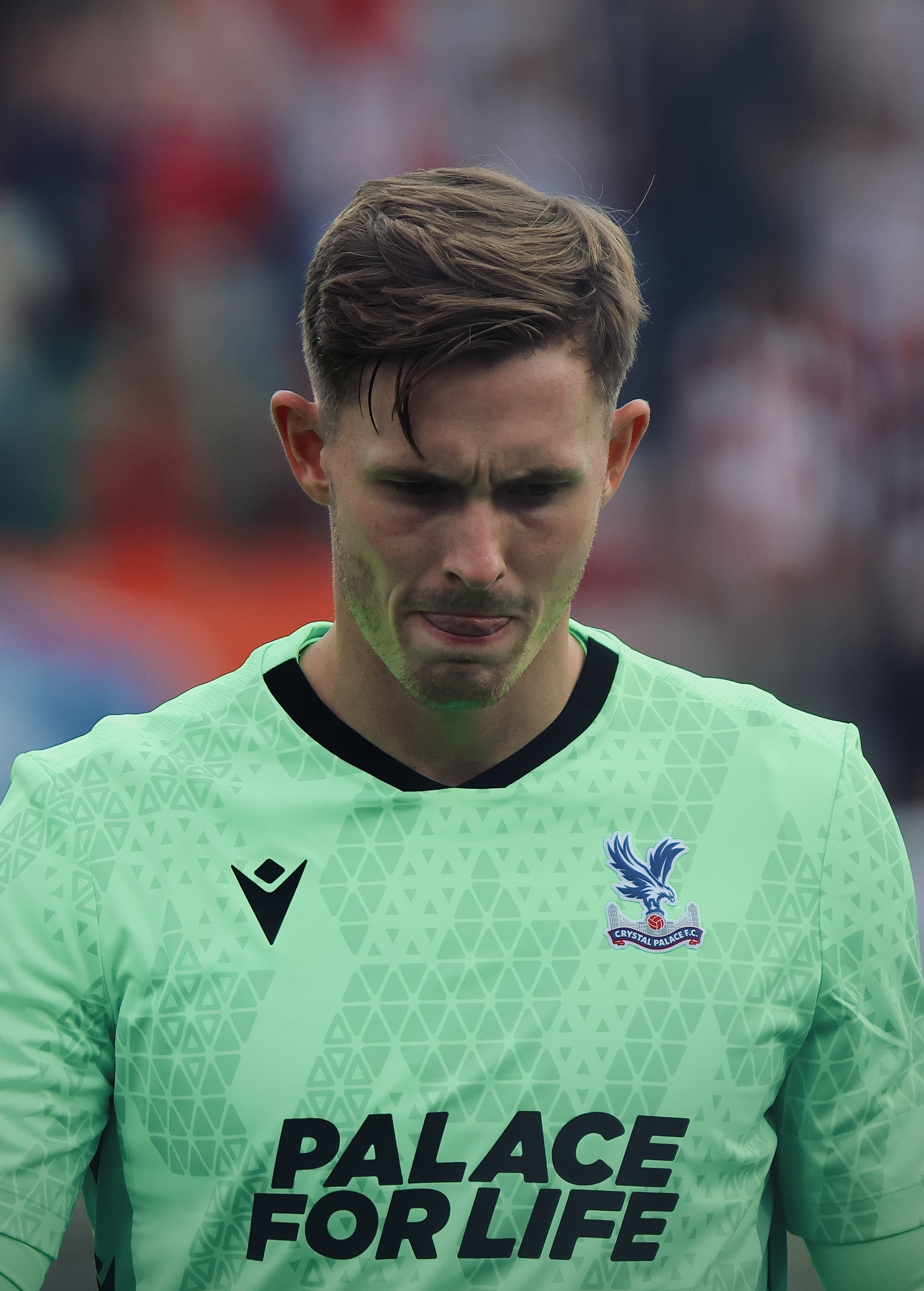
Henderson playing for Crystal Palace in 2025

On 31 August 2023, Henderson joined Premier League club Crystal Palace on a permanent deal, signing a five-year contract, reported to be worth £15 million, plus £5 million in add-ons. On 26 September, Henderson made his Palace debut against former club Manchester United in the third round of the EFL Cup. He was substituted in the 19th minute of the match with a thigh injury which kept him sidelined for over two months. On 17 December, he made his comeback from injury in a 2–2 draw at Manchester City, playing the full 90 minutes. He played the team's next seven Premier League fixtures, before being replaced by Sam Johnstone after a 3–1 loss at home to Chelsea on 12 February 2024. After Johnstone sustained an elbow injury while training with England on 25 March, Henderson returned to the Crystal Palace starting line-up for their 1–1 draw with Nottingham Forest five days later. He retained his place in the Palace goal for the remainder of the season, keeping his first Premier League clean sheet for the Eagles in a 1–0 win over Liverpool at Anfield.

Before the start of the 2024–25 season, Henderson was assigned the number 1 jersey, having worn number 30 the previous season. Henderson played every minute of Palace's 2025 FA Cup final 1–0 win over Manchester City on 17 May 2025; after a contentious handball call in which he was not sent off for handling the ball outside of his area, he later saved a penalty from Omar Marmoush and made a number of important saves to ensure a clean sheet, dedicating the victory to his late father. He was the highest rated player of the match (rated 9.07 out of 10) by BBC Sport users. Later that year, on 10 August, he saved two penalties during the shoot-out win over Liverpool in the Community Shield. On 23 January 2026, it was confirmed that manager Oliver Glasner had appointed Henderson as club captain following the departure of Marc Guéhi.

In the 2025–26 season, as the newly appointed captain, Henderson has solidified his position as the undisputed first-choice goalkeeper, starting every Premier League match (27 appearances, 2,430 minutes played as of 22 February 2026). He has achieved 10 clean sheets, made 74 saves, and conceded 32 goals (1.19 per game average), while delivering consistent high ratings and key interventions, such as a penalty save in a recent victory over Wolverhampton Wanderers. His leadership and reliability have been instrumental for Crystal Palace in their domestic campaign and UEFA Conference League participation.

== International career ==
=== Youth teams ===
Henderson played youth international football for England at under-16, under-17, under-20 and under-21 levels.

In late-August 2016, Henderson was called up by the England under-20 team for the first time. He made his under-20 debut in a 1–1 draw against Brazil on 1 September 2016. In May 2017, he was selected in the England under-20 squad for the 2017 FIFA U-20 World Cup. He made one appearance at the tournament, in a group stage match against Guinea, and was an unused substitute during England's victory against Venezuela in the final. After the match, Henderson described this an "unbelievable feeling".

In August 2017, Henderson was called up by the under-21 team for the first time and was an unused substitute against Latvia. He made his under-21 debut on 24 March 2018, in a friendly at home against Romania, which England won 2–1. Henderson was named as England's number one for the 2019 UEFA European Under-21 Championship.

=== Senior team ===
On 8 October 2019, Henderson was called up to the senior England squad for the first time by manager Gareth Southgate as a replacement for the injured Tom Heaton. He made his debut on 12 November 2020, when he came on at half-time to replace Nick Pope in a 3–0 win over the Republic of Ireland in a friendly.

Henderson was named as a member of England's 26-man squad for the delayed UEFA Euro 2020 and was allocated the number 13 shirt. However, he withdrew due to a hip injury after the first game and was replaced by Aaron Ramsdale. England ultimately lost the final to Italy and finished as runners-up.

Henderson was named in England's squad for UEFA Euro 2024.

On 13 October 2024, Henderson made his first start for England in a 3–1 away victory against Finland in the UEFA Nations League which was his first England appearance since 2020.

On 22 May 2026, Henderson was selected in the 26-man squad for the 2026 FIFA World Cup. On 18 July 2026, Henderson started the third-place match against France as England achieved a 6–4 victory.

== Style of play ==
Henderson is known for his distribution with both his hands and feet as a goalkeeper, as well as his ability to claim crosses or to catch and punch high balls, with Rob Dawson of ESPN describing him as "more complete" than his teammate David de Gea in 2021. Mark Critchley of The Independent has also described him as a "vocal presence" in goal. He is also known for his reflexes.

== Personal life ==
Henderson was born in Whitehaven, Cumbria. He played county cricket as a schoolboy and was an accomplished batsman and wicket-keeper but chose football. Henderson initially started out as an outfield player before switching to his role as a goalkeeper.

During his time at Shrewsbury Town, Henderson shaved off all of his hair in support of Hope House children's hospice.

On 27 May 2019, Henderson achieved two Guinness World Records titles for 'Fastest time to dress as a goalkeeper (football)' (49.51 seconds) and 'Most football headed passes in one minute (team of two)' (91 – with Jake Clarke-Salter).

== Career statistics ==
=== Club ===
As of match played 31 October 2026

Appearances and goals by club, season and competition
| Club | Season | League | | | FA Cup | | EFL Cup | | Europe | | Other | | Total | |
| Club | Season | Division | Apps | Goals | Apps | Goals | Apps | Goals | Apps | Goals | Apps | Goals | Apps | Goals |
|---|---|---|---|---|---|---|---|---|---|---|---|---|---|---|
| Manchester United | 2020–21 | Premier League | 13 | 0 | 4 | 0 | 4 | 0 | 5 (Note: One appearance in UEFA Champions League, four appearances in UEFA Europa League) | 0 | — | | 26 | 0 |
| Manchester United | 2021–22 | Premier League | 0 | 0 | 1 | 0 | 1 | 0 | 1 (Note: Appearance in UEFA Champions League) | 0 | — | | 3 | 0 |
| Manchester United | Total | | 13 | 0 | 5 | 0 | 5 | 0 | 6 | 0 | 0 | 0 | 29 | 0 |
| Stockport County (loan) | 2015–16 | National League North | 9 | 0 | — | | — | | — | | — | | 9 | 0 |
| Grimsby Town (loan) | 2016–17 | League Two | 7 | 0 | 0 | 0 | — | | — | | 0 | 0 | 7 | 0 |
| Shrewsbury Town (loan) | 2017–18 | League One | 38 | 0 | 2 | 0 | 1 | 0 | — | | 7 (Note: Four appearances in EFL Trophy, three appearances in League One play-offs) | 0 | 48 | 0 |
| Sheffield United (loan) | 2018–19 | Championship | 46 | 0 | 0 | 0 | 0 | 0 | — | | — | | 46 | 0 |
| Sheffield United (loan) | 2019–20 | Premier League | 36 | 0 | 4 | 0 | 0 | 0 | — | | — | | 40 | 0 |
| Sheffield United (loan) | Total | | 82 | 0 | 4 | 0 | 0 | 0 | — | | — | | 86 | 0 |
| Nottingham Forest (loan) | 2022–23 | Premier League | 18 | 0 | 0 | 0 | 2 | 0 | — | | — | | 20 | 0 |
| Crystal Palace | 2023–24 | Premier League | 18 | 0 | 1 | 0 | 1 | 0 | — | | — | | 20 | 0 |
| Crystal Palace | 2024–25 | Premier League | 38 | 0 | 3 | 0 | 3 | 0 | — | | — | | 44 | 0 |
| Crystal Palace | 2025–26 | Premier League | 37 | 0 | 0 | 0 | 0 | 0 | 14 (Note: Appearances in UEFA Conference League) | 0 | 1 (Note: Appearance in FA Community Shield) | 0 | 52 | 0 |
| Crystal Palace | 2026–27 | Premier League | 4 | 0 | 0 | 0 | 1 | 0 | 0 | 0 | — | | 5 | 0 |
| Crystal Palace | Total | | 97 | 0 | 4 | 0 | 5 | 0 | 14 | 0 | 1 | 0 | 121 | 0 |
| Career total | | | 264 | 0 | 15 | 0 | 13 | 0 | 20 | 0 | 8 | 0 | 320 | 0 |

=== International ===
As of match played 18 July 2026

Appearances and goals by national team and year
| National team | Year | Apps | Goals |
|---|---|---|---|
| England | 2020 | 1 | 0 |
| England | 2021 | 0 | 0 |
| England | 2022 | 0 | 0 |
| England | 2023 | 0 | 0 |
| England | 2024 | 1 | 0 |
| England | 2025 | 2 | 0 |
| England | 2026 | 2 | 0 |
| Total | | 6 | 0 |

== Honours ==
Shrewsbury Town

- EFL Trophy runner-up: 2017–18

Manchester United

- UEFA Europa League runner-up: 2020–21

Crystal Palace

- FA Cup: 2024–25
- FA Community Shield: 2025
- UEFA Conference League: 2025–26

England U20

- FIFA U-20 World Cup: 2017

England

- FIFA World Cup third place: 2026
- UEFA European Championship runner-up: 2020, 2024

Individual

- PFA Team of the Year: 2017–18 League One
- Sheffield United Young Player of the Year: 2018–19, 2019–20
- Sheffield United Community Player of the Year: 2018–19
- EFL Championship Golden Glove: 2018–19
- UEFA Conference League Team of the Season: 2025–26
