= Aliou Traoré =

French footballer (born 2001)

Personal information
- Full name: Aliou Badara Traoré
- Date of birth: 8 January 2001 (age 25)
- Place of birth: Sarcelles, France
- Height: 1.88 m (6 ft 2 in)
- Position: Midfielder

Team information
- Current team: Vizela
- Number: 95

Youth career
- 2010–2014: Sarcelles
- 2014–2016: Paris Saint-Germain
- 2016–2017: Sarcelles
- 2017–2020: Manchester United

Senior career*
Years	Team	Apps	(Gls)
2020–2021	Manchester United	0	(0)
2020–2021	→ Caen II (loan)	3	(0)
2020–2021	→ Caen (loan)	19	(0)
2021–2022	Parma	2	(0)
2022–2023	Frosinone	0	(0)
2023–2024	Göztepe	28	(2)
2024–2025	Ankara Keçiörengücü	44	(3)
2025–2026	Vanspor	34	(0)
2026–	Vizela	0	(0)

International career^{‡}
2017	France U16	7	(2)
2020	France U19	1	(0)
- * Club domestic league appearances and goals as of 14 September 2026 ‡ National team caps and goals as of 25 August 2020

Aliou Badara Traoré (born 8 January 2001) is a French professional footballer who plays as a midfielder for Liga Portugal 2 club Vizela.

== Club career ==
=== Manchester United ===
Traoré joined the Manchester United youth academy in 2017 and signed his first professional contract with the club on 9 January 2018, the day after his 17th birthday. He appeared for the club's under-21 side in the 2019–20 EFL Trophy, first as an unused substitute in the opening match against Rotherham United, before playing the full 90 minutes of matches against Lincoln City and Tranmere Rovers.

==== Caen (loan) ====
On 17 August 2020, Traoré signed with Caen on a season-long loan. He made his debut for Caen in a goalless draw away to Clermont on the opening day of the 2020–21 Ligue 2 season on 22 August 2020, coming on as a 69th-minute substitute for Jessy Deminguet.

On 4 June 2021, Traoré was one of eight Manchester United players to be released following the 2020–21 season.

=== Parma ===
On 8 September 2021, Traoré joined Parma.

=== Frosinone ===
On 3 October 2022, Traoré signed a contract with Serie B club Frosinone until 30 June 2023.

=== Göztepe ===
On 31 January 2023 he joined Turkish side Göztepe.

== International career ==
Born in France, Traoré is of Malian descent. He is a youth international for France and has been capped at under-16 and under-19 levels.
