= Richard Arnold (executive) =

British businessman

- Born: 26 April 1971 (age 55)
- Education: University of Bristol; Bachelor of Science in Biology (1993); Chartered Accountant (1996)
- Occupation: Accountant
- Employers: PricewaterhouseCoopers (1993–1999); Global Crossing (1999–2002); InterVoice Ltd (2002–2007); Manchester United F.C. (2008–2023)
- Title: Chief executive officer (2022–2023); Group Managing Director

Richard Arnold (born 26 April 1971) is a British accountant who was chief executive officer of Manchester United. He succeeded Ed Woodward in this role on 1 February 2022.

== Education ==
Arnold was educated at King's School, Chester and the University of Bristol in the United Kingdom, earning a Bachelor of Science in Biology in 1993. He qualified as a Chartered Accountant in 1996. He currently serves as a governor of King's School.

== Career ==
Arnold joined PricewaterhouseCoopers (PwC) in 1993, working as a senior manager in telecommunications and media. While at PwC, he worked on the privatisation of Saudi Telecom Company and was involved in the initial public offering of Orange Telecommunications in the UK.

After six years at PwC, Arnold joined Global Crossing Europe Ltd., a global telecommunications company, and assisted them with their restructuring of the business between 1999 and 2002.

Arnold was appointed Deputy Managing Director of InterVoice Ltd. in 2002, with responsibility for the international channel sales and marketing division of the technology company (InterVoice Inc.), listed on the Nasdaq stock exchange.

In 2007, Arnold joined Manchester United as group commercial director. He was promoted to group managing director and director of Manchester United PLC on 1 July 2013, assuming control of the club's business operations, after Chief Executive David Gill was replaced by Executive Vice-Chairman Ed Woodward. Arnold sat on the board of Manchester United Television (MUTV) and Manchester United Merchandising Limited. During his time at the club, he was instrumental in growing the global appeal of the Manchester United brand, opening commercial offices in Mayfair (London), New York City and Hong Kong. Arnold oversaw the signing of a number of lucrative sponsorship contracts, including a world record seven-year US$600 million kit sponsorship deal with General Motors/Chevrolet (2014), and a $1.3 billion sports equipment deal with Adidas over 10 years (2015), the most valuable in sporting history at the time. Manchester United announced his departure from the club in November 2023.

Arnold was nominated as a finalist by the Institute of Directors for the Young Director of the Year in 2004 and 2005 for his work at InterVoice. In 2011, he was nominated for the SportBusiness International Magazine's Sports Innovator of the Year, for his commercial achievements with Manchester United.
