= Lowry Hotel =

English five-star hotel

The Lowry Hotel
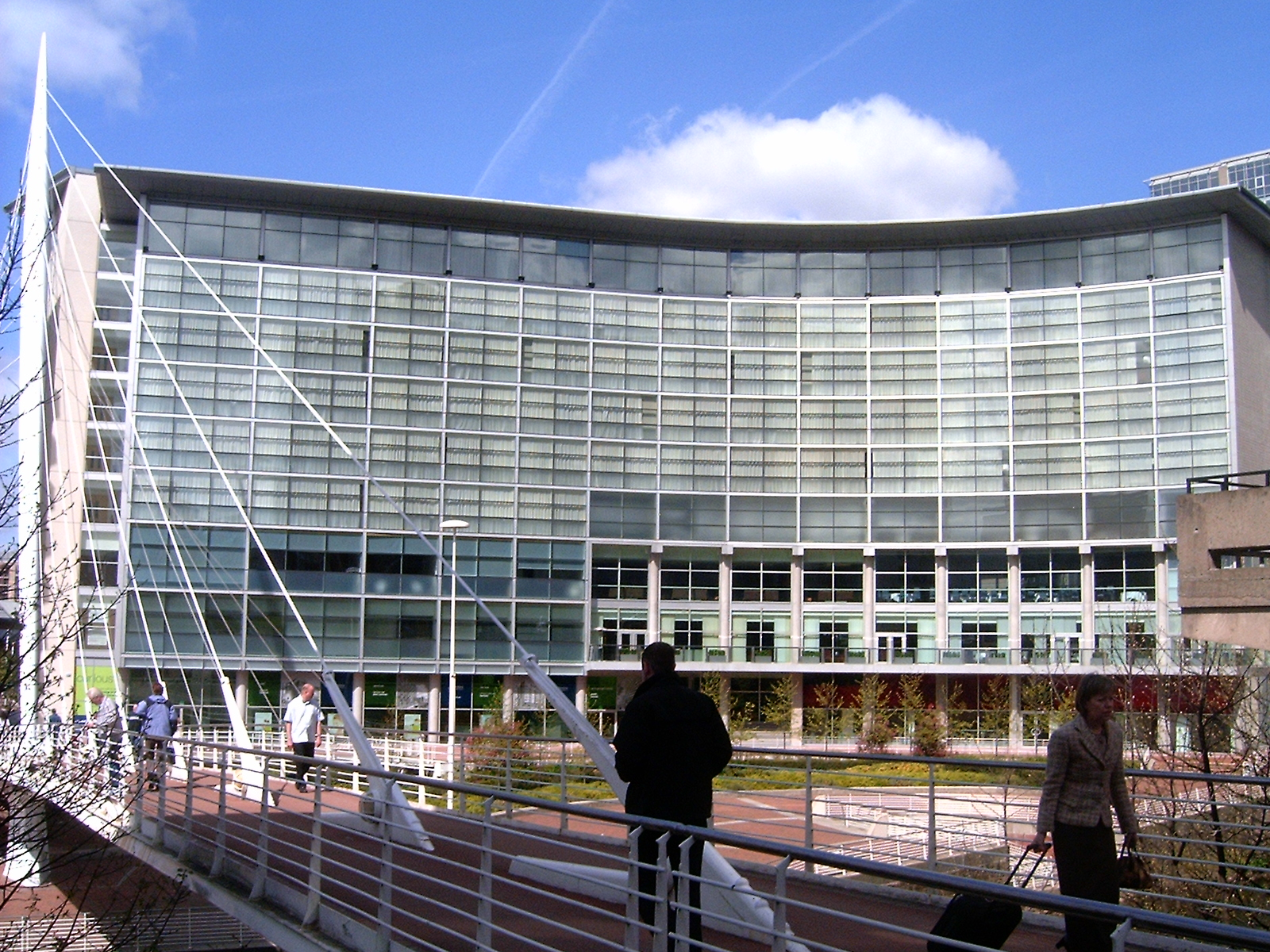

General information
- Location: Salford; Greater Manchester; England
- Coordinates: 53°28′58″N 2°15′03″W
- Opening: 2001
- Owner: Westmont Hospitality Group
- Operator: Westmont Hospitality Group

Technical details
- Floor count: 8

Design and construction
- Architect: Consarc Design Architects

Other information
- Number of rooms: 165
- Number of suites: 7
- Number of restaurants: 1
- Parking: Valet Parking

Website
- thelowryhotel.com

The Lowry Hotel is located by the River Irwell in Salford, Greater Manchester, England. The five-star hotel is named after the artist L. S. Lowry. Although within the boundaries of the City of Salford, it is close to Manchester city centre and is known as "The Lowry Hotel Manchester". Upon opening, Marco Pierre White was the overseeing chef of the River Room restaurant.

== Ownership ==
The hotel was owned by The Rocco Forte Collection, the company of Sir Rocco Forte, son of the late hotel magnate Baron Charles Forte. In November 2016, the hotel was put up for sale, two years after being acquired by Westmont Hospitality Group and Mount Kellett Capital Management in a deal estimated to be worth £40m.

== Architecture ==
The Lowry Hotel structure is a reinforced concrete frame on continuous flight auger piles constructed on a brown field site adjacent to the River Irwell. The external façades are glazed with rain screen cladding hung from the frame.

== Guests ==
Portuguese football manager José Mourinho lived in the Lowry during his time as manager of Manchester United, spending an estimated £716,000 over more than two years.
