= 2021 Old Trafford protests =

Protests against the Glazer ownership of Manchester United

- Part of opposition to Glazer ownership of Manchester United
- Date: 2 May 2021
- Location: Old Trafford and the Lowry Hotel
- Caused by: Glazer ownership of Manchester United; European Super League
- Methods: Protests

Casualties
- Injuries: 7 (6 police, 1 civilian)
- Arrested: 1
- Charged: 1

The 2021 Old Trafford protests were a series of protests against the Glazer ownership of Manchester United following the club's announcement it had joined the European Super League project that subsequently collapsed. On 2 May, fans organised protests outside Manchester United's Old Trafford stadium and the Lowry Hotel prior to the club's Premier League fixture against Liverpool.

A number of protesters were able to gain access to the stadium resulting in an initial delay to kick-off, before the eventual postponement of the fixture. This was the first time that a Premier League match had ever been postponed due to a protest.

== Background ==
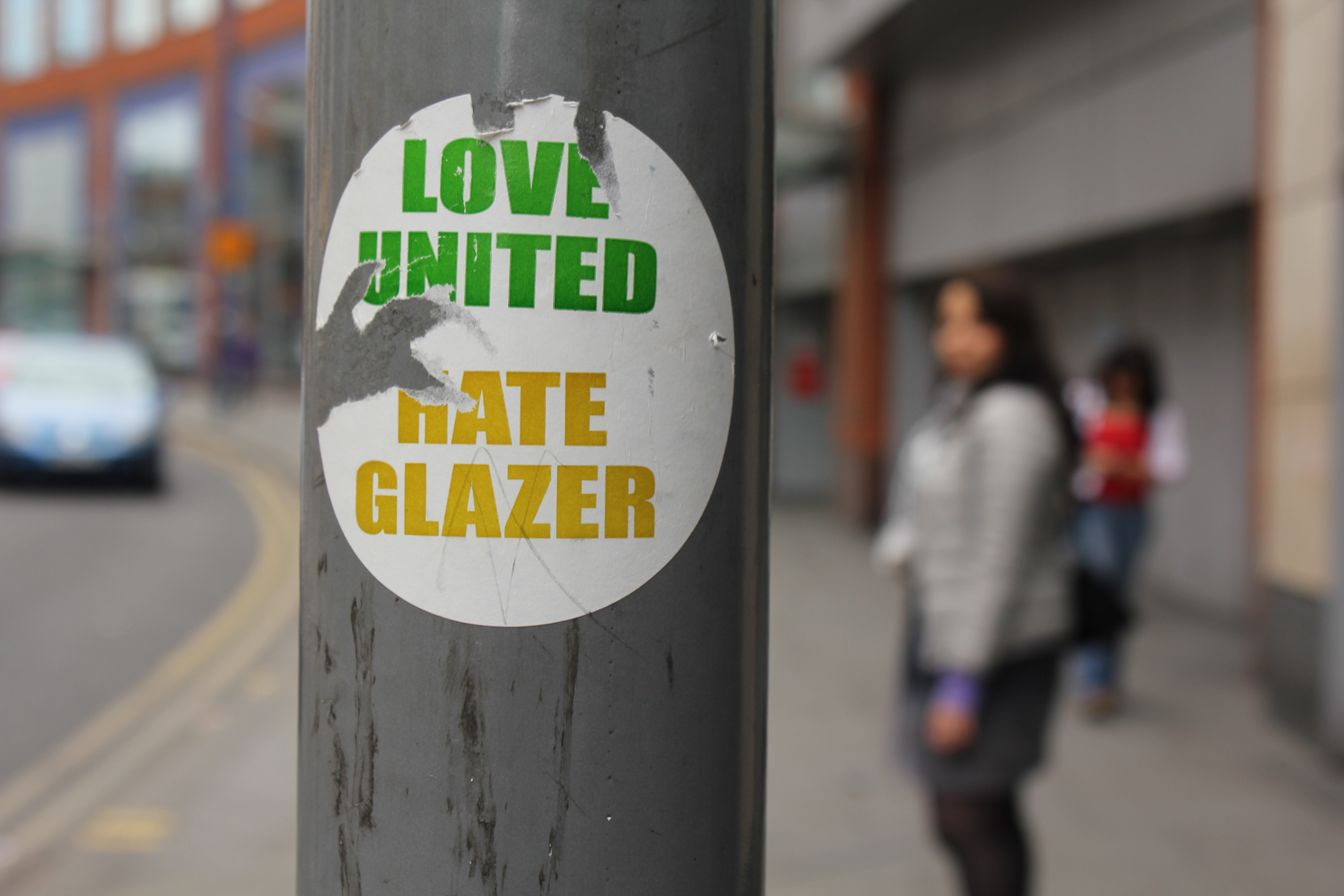
A sticker on a lamppost in Withy Grove, Manchester City Centre displaying anti-Glazer sentiment

In April 2021, Joel Glazer played a high-profile role in controversial plans to have Manchester United compete in a proposed European Super League. Plans were announced on 18 April and were unpopular with fans. Despite Manchester United's withdrawal from the competition three days later and heavy backlash from fans, players, managers and pundits, protests still continued.

On 22 April, a group of around 20 supporters gained entry to Manchester United's training ground to stage a protest against Glazer's ownership. Two days later, a second protest outside Old Trafford saw over 2,000 fans protest against Glazer's ownership and advocate for the 50+1 rule seen in German football. Joel Glazer later apologised to the team's fans, saying "[he] got it wrong," but fans remained enraged, telling a team executive they were "disgusted, embarrassed, and angry" with his actions.

Prior to the 2021 attempt to join the European Super League by the Glazer ownership, significant series of protests against their ownership had occurred in 2010, colloquially called "The Green and Gold Movement". As well as in 2005, before the club was acquired by the Glazer family.

== Events ==
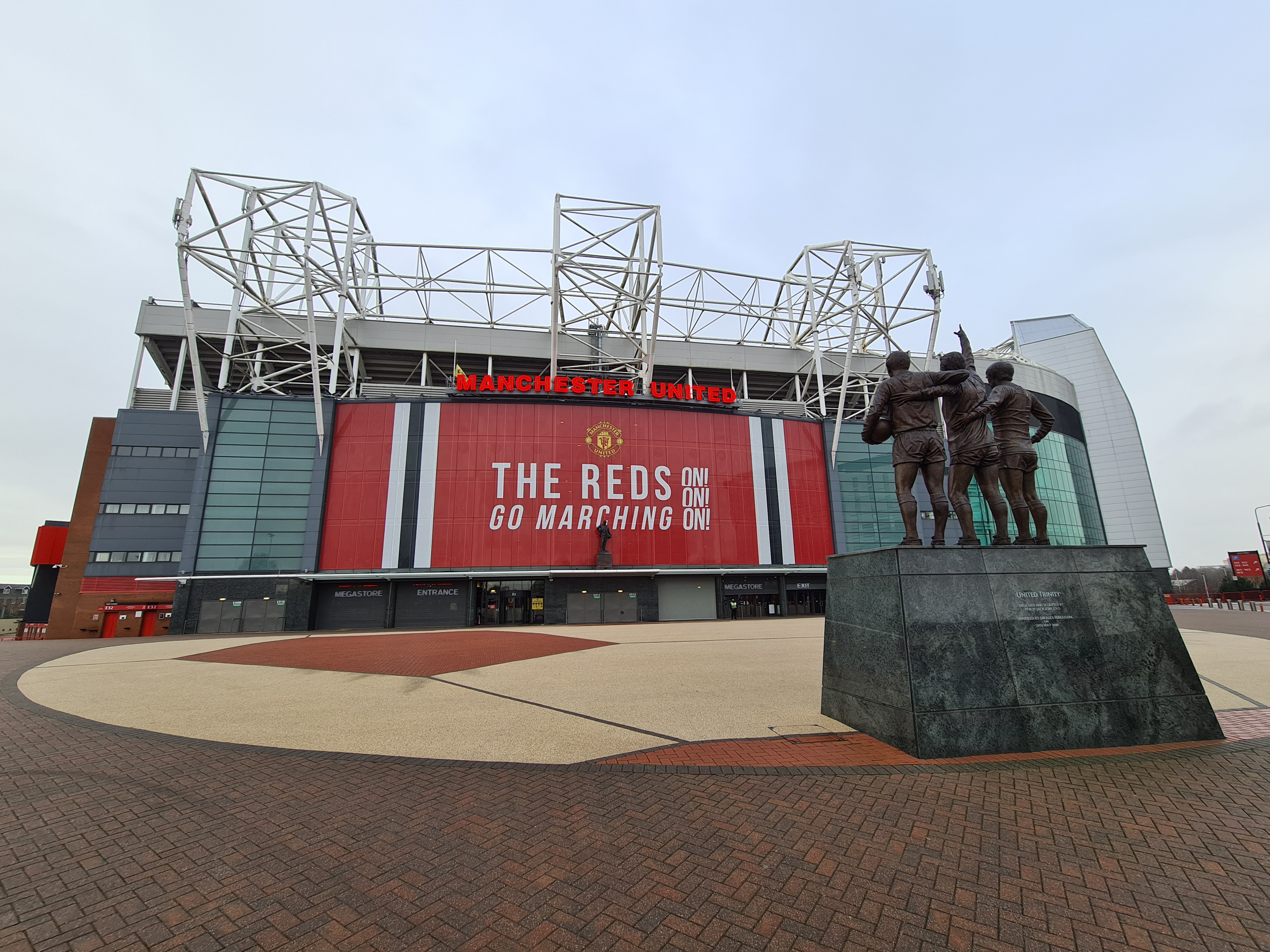
The forecourt outside Old Trafford's East Stand was the main venue of the protest

On 2 May 2021, Manchester United were scheduled to play rivals Liverpool in a Premier League fixture at Old Trafford, during the 2020–21 season. The match was abandoned due to a stadium invasion and subsequent pitch invasion as part a second protest at Old Trafford, and third in total when including the Carrington protest. The match, which had been due to kick off at 16:30 (BST), was officially postponed at 17:35 (BST).

=== Timeline ===
At 13:00 BST the first of the protesters began to gather outside Old Trafford ahead of the scheduled start time by Manchester United supporters of 14:00 BST for the protest with some reports suggesting over 10,000 protesters were in attendance. A second, smaller protest occurred outside the Lowry Hotel where the Manchester United players were staying before the match. Initial reports of a security breach at the stadium occurred at 14:30 BST, with a portion of the protesters gaining access to the stadium and making their way onto the pitch. At 15:00 BST, a security sweep of the stadium began in an attempt to remove all protesters, assess pitch damage, and determine if a breach of COVID-19 protocols had occurred. The Premier League published the official team sheets at the required time of 15:30 BST but at 15:55 BST, the Premier League confirmed there would be a delay in kick-off. It was reported that the stadium was cleared of protesters ahead of the originally scheduled 16:30 BST kick-off time, but the decision was taken to postpone the game at 17:50 BST.

=== Incidents ===
Six police officers were injured in the protests, with one sustaining a fractured eye socket. One man was arrested in connection with the assault on one of the officers.

The family of a protester alleged police officers inflicted a broken jaw and ribs in the process of arresting him on suspicion of theft from a motor vehicle and a public order offence.

On 4 May 2021, a 28-year-old man was charged for throwing fireworks in a street, using threatening behaviour and wilfully obstructing the highway near the Lowry Hotel.

== Reaction ==
Former players of Liverpool and Manchester United and current Sky Sports pundits Jamie Carragher, Gary Neville, and Roy Keane expressed support for the cause of the protesters and criticised the actions of the Glazer family with regards to their general operation of the club since their takeover, and their more recent involvement in the European Super League project. In a BBC article on the protest by Simon Stone, he described the protest as 16 years in the making.

The mayor of Greater Manchester, Andy Burnham and then-British Prime Minister Boris Johnson, also expressed support for the cause of the protesters. Burnham remarked that it was "essential that those running the club and the game listen", but condemned the violent actions of a small minority of protesters while the Prime Minister sympathised with the protesters "strength of feeling" but also said "disruptive behaviour and demonstrations of that kind... is not a good idea."

The chairman of the National Police Federation, John Apter, condemned the violence saying "Yet again we've seen a so-called peaceful protest turn to violence with that aimed at my colleagues. Officers were injured and required hospital treatment. This is completely unacceptable". The assistant chief constable of Greater Manchester, Russ Jackson, said it was clear that a few people had turned up not to protest, but instead just to cause trouble. He described those few as "reckless and dangerous".

ESPN faced criticism when Jon Champion was cut off by the network as he criticised the Glazer family ownership of the club and the use of the North American franchise model in Europe. ESPN cited technical difficulties as the reason for the cut-off.

During an attempted interview with Sky on 4 May, Avram Glazer refused to apologise to fans or comment about the protests.

== Outcome ==
On 3 May, a day after the protest, and following other protests across the country, the Premier League announced plans to bring in a new owners' charter which would prevent football club owners from forming future breakaway leagues, as well as introducing further restrictions and tougher penalties for non-compliance.

On 8 May, UK retail and technology company The Hut Group pulled out of a £200 million sponsorship deal with the club due to the protests.

The postponed match was rearranged to 13 May, which saw Liverpool win 4–2. Ahead of the game, a third Anti-Glazer protest occurred outside the ground, however heightened police and security presence prevented disruption to the game.

Two seasons on, another demonstration against the Glazer ownership took place ahead of another home game against Liverpool on 22 August 2022, marking the fourth significant protest at Old Trafford within 18 months. A heightened police presence prevented any disruption to the game which saw Manchester United win 2–1.

In addition, relatively minor protests have sporadically occurred.

On 22 November 2022, The Glazers announced they were open to a sale of the club.

On 20 February 2024, the Glazers completed a partial sale of Manchester United to Jim Ratcliffe's Ineos for approximately £1.3 billion for an initial 26.2% stake including full control of the football department.

On 9 March 2025, what was described as the first major protest since Ratcliffe's partial take over saw thousands of fans protest against Glazer and Ratcliffe ownership following a ticket price increase to £66 and 450 staff redundancies in aim to curb £131 million in annual losses. The club was still over £1 billion in debt having incurred £37 million in debt interest in the previous year.
