= Ed Woodward =

English banker

- Born: Edward Gareth Woodward; 9 November 1971 (age 54); Chelmsford, Essex, England
- Education: University of Bristol
- Occupation: Accountant
- Employers: PricewaterhouseCoopers; Robert Fleming & Co.; J.P. Morgan & Co.
- Title: Executive vice-chairman
- Spouse: Isabelle Nicole Caprano (m. 2001)

Edward Gareth Woodward (born 9 November 1971) is an English accountant and investment banker who was the executive vice-chairman and effectively the chief executive of Manchester United from 2012 to 2022. Richard Arnold succeeded him in his role.

== Education ==
Woodward attended Brentwood School in Brentwood, Essex from 1983 to 1989. He went on to study physics at the University of Bristol graduating in 1993. He later qualified as a chartered accountant in 1996.

== Career ==
Woodward began working for PricewaterhouseCoopers in the accounting and tax advisory department in 1993, before joining J.P. Morgan & Co. as an investment banker in the mergers and acquisitions department in 1999.

In 2005, Woodward advised Malcolm Glazer and the Glazer family during its successful takeover of Manchester United. The Glazer family then recruited Woodward to join the club in a "financial planning" role.

In 2007, Woodward was given charge of the commercial and media operations of Manchester United. It was in this role that Woodward is credited for United's success in tying up lucrative sponsorship deals with companies around the world. In 2005, the club's commercial revenue was £48.7 million. In 2012, it stood at £117.6 million.

Woodward was appointed to the board of directors and named executive vice-chairman of Manchester United in 2012. After the retirement of CEO David Gill the following year, Woodward was promoted to the top operational role at Old Trafford in a restructuring of the club's boardroom. Woodward was succeeded by Richard Arnold as the club's commercial management director.

In August 2016, Woodward secured the transfer of Paul Pogba for a record breaking fee of £89 million, making him the world's most expensive footballer at the time.

On 20 April 2021, Woodward announced he would resign as executive vice-chairman of Manchester United at the end of the year, following unprecedented criticism of Manchester United's failed attempt at forming and joining a European Super League. Woodward was reported to have been heavily involved in plans for the Super League "from day one". By the end of that season, he had also overseen Manchester United's worst trophy drought since the mid-1980s, a period of four years without any silverware. In an announcement on Manchester United's website, it was confirmed that Woodward would leave his position on 1 February 2022.

== Criticism ==
Woodward's first transfer window in 2013, in which Manchester United completed the signing of Belgian midfielder Marouane Fellaini from Everton but failed to acquire other transfer targets, was described as being "disastrous" by The Daily Telegraph.

In July 2014, the newly appointed Manchester United coach, Louis van Gaal complained that Manchester United's excessive commercial activities could hamper the team's success and hoped there could be some balance to that.

After the 2018 summer transfer window, it was speculated in the media that Woodward had vetoed the transfer targets given to him by then manager José Mourinho at the end of the 2017–18 season. This created tension in the club, with Mourinho and the United fans alike criticising Woodward for the lack of improvement in the squad.

In January 2020, Woodward's Cheshire home was attacked by a group of disgruntled Manchester United supporters chanting that he was "going to die". This followed similar chanting at Old Trafford during previous games, at which supporters called for Woodward and the club's owners, the Glazer family, to leave. In response to the incident at Woodward's home, Manchester United said that anyone committing a criminal offence or trespassing would be banned for life.

== Personal life ==
Woodward supported non-league Chelmsford City in his youth. His father was a fan of both Derby County and Manchester United, and was present for the latter's victory in the 1968 European Cup Final at the old Wembley Stadium.
