= Jacob Carney =

English footballer (born 2001)

Personal information
- Full name: Jacob Andrew Carney
- Date of birth: 21 April 2001 (age 25)
- Place of birth: Rotherham, England
- Height: 1.88 m (6 ft 2 in)
- Position: Goalkeeper

Team information
- Current team: Glenavon
- Number: 1

Youth career
- –2019: Manchester United

Senior career*
Years	Team	Apps	(Gls)
2019–2021	Manchester United	0	(0)
2019	→ Stocksbridge Park Steels (loan)		
2019–2020	→ Stocksbridge Park Steels (loan)		
2020	→ Brighouse Town (loan)		
2021	→ Portadown (loan)	26	(0)
2021–2023	Sunderland	0	(0)
2023–2024	Castellón	1	(0)
2024–2025	Newport County	3	(0)
2025–	Glenavon	26	(0)
- * Club domestic league appearances and goals as of 29 April 2026

Jacob Andrew Carney (born 21 April 2001) is an English professional footballer who plays for NIFL Premiership club Glenavon, as a goalkeeper.

== Career ==
Born in Rotherham, Carney began his career with Manchester United, moving on loan to Stocksbridge Park Steels in August 2019, with the loan ending in September. He returned to the club on loan in December 2019, with that loan deal being extended in February 2020. In October 2020 he moved on loan to Brighouse Town, before signing on loan for Northern Irish club Portadown in January 2021.

After leaving Manchester United, in May 2021 he was linked with possible transfers to Sunderland, Brighton and Burnley, eventually signing for Sunderland in July 2021.

In August 2023 he returned to Manchester United on trial, but instead signed for Spanish club Castellón in September.

Carney signed for EFL League Two club Newport County in June 2024. Carney made his debut for Newport on 13 August 2024 in the 4–1 EFL Cup first round defeat to Leyton Orient. He made his football league debut for Newport on 12 October 2024 in the 1-0 EFL League Two defeat to Harrogate Town. Harrogate's goal was attributed to an error by Carney, although he was defended by head coach Nelson Jardim.

On 6 August 2025, Carney left Newport by mutual consent and returned to Northern Ireland, signing for NIFL Premiership club Glenavon. He made his debut 3 days later, in a 2-0 defeat to Ballymena United.

== Personal life ==
His father Andy is a football coach and former player.
